= Table tennis at the 2026 Asian Para Games =

Para table tennis at the 2026 Asian Para Games
- Venue: Sky Hall Toyota
- Location: Toyota, Aichi Prefecture, Japan
- Dates: 19–23 October
- Nations: 31

Para Table Tennis at the 2026 Asian Para Games was held at Sky Hall Toyota in Toyota, Japan, between 19 and 23 October 2026.

== Entries ==
1. Afghanistan (1)
2. Bangladesh (2)
3. Cambodia (2)
4. China (19)
5. Hong Kong (14)
6. India (10)
7. Indonesia (11)
8. Iran (1)
9. Iraq (5)
10. Japan (22) (hosts)
11. Jordan (2)
12. Kazakhstan (12)
13. South Korea (21)
14. Kuwait (4)
15. Saudi Arabia (4)
16. Macau (4)
17. Malaysia (4)
18. Mongolia (2)
19. Nepal (7)
20. Pakistan (3)
21. North Korea (2)
22. Philippines (6)
23. Singapore (1)
24. Sri Lanka (2)
25. Chinese Taipei (12)
26. Tajikistan (1)
27. Thailand (22)
28. Timor-Leste (1)
29. United Arab Emirates (2)
30. Uzbekistan (1)
31. Vietnam (2)

== Medal Table ==
* Host nation (Japan)

Rank	Nation	Gold	Silver	Bronze	Total
1	China	10	6	7	23
2	South Korea	8	6	6	20
3	Japan*	4	3	4	11
4	Chinese Taipei	2	4	1	7
5	Thailand	1	1	11	13
6	Indonesia	1	0	4	5
7	Iraq	1	0	1	2
8	Hong Kong	0	3	8	11
9	Saudi Arabia	0	2	0	2
10	North Korea	0	1	0	1
10	Philippines	0	1	0	1
12	India	0	0	7	7
13	Kazakhstan	0	0	3	3
14	Iran	0	0	1	1
14	Malaysia	0	0	1	1
Totals (15 entries)		27	27	54	108

== Medallists ==
=== Men ===
Event	Class	Gold	Silver	Bronze
Singles	1	Kim Hyeon-uk; South Korea	Rakan Al-Salmi; Saudi Arabia	Ardak Nurmagambetov; Kazakhstan
Singles	1	Kim Hyeon-uk; South Korea	Rakan Al-Salmi; Saudi Arabia	Jehan Madan; India
Singles	2	Park Jin-cheol; South Korea	Kim Kyung-hyun; South Korea	Hassan Janfeshan; Iran
Singles	2	Park Jin-cheol; South Korea	Kim Kyung-hyun; South Korea	Thirayu Chueawong; Thailand
Singles	3	Feng Panfeng; China	Jang Yeong-jin; South Korea	Yuichiro Kitagawa; Japan
Singles	3	Feng Panfeng; China	Jang Yeong-jin; South Korea	Yuttajak Glinbancheun; Thailand
Singles	4-5	Peng Zhengyang; China	Cheng Ming-chih; Chinese Taipei	Barce Layaba; Indonesia
Singles	4-5	Peng Zhengyang; China	Cheng Ming-chih; Chinese Taipei	Wanchai Chaiwut; Thailand
Singles	6	Rungroj Thainiyom; Thailand	Jon Ju-hyon; North Korea	Chen Chao; China
Singles	6	Rungroj Thainiyom; Thailand	Jon Ju-hyon; North Korea	Muntadher Al-Sarraji; Iraq
Singles	7	Yan Shuo; China	Katsuyoshi Yagi; Japan	Liao Keli; China
Singles	7	Yan Shuo; China	Katsuyoshi Yagi; Japan	Chalermpong Punpoo; Thailand
Singles	8	Zhao Shuai; China	Hayuma Abe; Japan	Ali Makhulbekov; Kazakhstan
Singles	8	Zhao Shuai; China	Hayuma Abe; Japan	Phisit Wangphonphathanasiri; Thailand
Singles	9	Koyo Iwabuchi; Japan	Zhao Yiqing; China	Wong Chi Yin; Hong Kong
Singles	9	Koyo Iwabuchi; Japan	Zhao Yiqing; China	Wong Hon Lam; Hong Kong
Singles	10	Mahiro Funayama; Japan	Lin Chun-ting; Chinese Taipei	Lian Hao; China
Singles	10	Mahiro Funayama; Japan	Lin Chun-ting; Chinese Taipei	Komet Akbar; Indonesia
Singles	11	Kim Gi-tae; South Korea	Chen Po-yen; Chinese Taipei	Kim Bo-gyeom; South Korea
Singles	11	Kim Gi-tae; South Korea	Chen Po-yen; Chinese Taipei	Jennahtul Ahmad; Malaysia
Doubles	4			
Doubles	8			
Doubles	14			
Doubles	18			
Doubles	22			

=== Women ===
Event	Class	Gold	Silver	Bronze
Singles	1	Kim Eun-hee; South Korea	Maryam Almyrisl; Saudi Arabia	Mao Lin; China
Singles	2	Seo Su-yeon; South Korea	Liu Jing; China	Chilchitparyak Bootwansirina; Thailand
Singles	2	Seo Su-yeon; South Korea	Liu Jing; China	Suthida Saensathan; Thailand
Singles	3	Yoon Ji-yu; South Korea	Huang Zhirui; China	Lee Mi-gyu; South Korea
Singles	3	Yoon Ji-yu; South Korea	Huang Zhirui; China	Sonalben Patel; India
Singles	4-5	Zhang Bian; China	Jung Young-a; South Korea	Bhavina Patel; India
Singles	4-5	Zhang Bian; China	Jung Young-a; South Korea	Wijittra Jaion; Thailand
Singles	6	Najlah Al-Dayyeni; Iraq	Liu Xiaowu; China	Pang Wing Ka; Hong Kong
Singles	6	Najlah Al-Dayyeni; Iraq	Liu Xiaowu; China	Prachi Pandey; India
Singles	7	Wang Rui; China	Chiu Kan Shan; Hong Kong	Wong Yue Ching; Hong Kong
Singles	7	Wang Rui; China	Chiu Kan Shan; Hong Kong	Kim Seong-ok; South Korea
Singles	8	Huang Wenjuan; China	Yuri Tomono; Japan	Hamida; Indonesia
Singles	8	Huang Wenjuan; China	Yuri Tomono; Japan	Asako Kurashimo; Japan
Singles	9	Mao Jingdian; China	Xiong Guiyan; China	Kim Kun-hea; South Korea
Singles	9	Mao Jingdian; China	Xiong Guiyan; China	Baby Sahana Ravi; India
Singles	10	Lin Tzu-yu; Chinese Taipei	Tien Shiau-wen; Chinese Taipei	Hou Chunxiao; China
Singles	10	Lin Tzu-yu; Chinese Taipei	Tien Shiau-wen; Chinese Taipei	Lam Yan Yu; Hong Kong
Singles	11	Miya Yamaguchi; Japan	Wong Ting Ting; Hong Kong	Ibuki Mawatari; Japan
Singles	11	Miya Yamaguchi; Japan	Wong Ting Ting; Hong Kong	Li Yi-ya; Chinese Taipei
Doubles	5			
Doubles	10			
Doubles	14			
Doubles	20			
Doubles	22			

=== Mixed ===
Event	Class	Gold	Silver	Bronze
Doubles	4	South Korea (KOR); Kim Hyeon-uk; Yoon Ji-yu	South Korea (KOR); Park Jin-cheol; Seo Su-yeon	Thailand (THA); Thirayu Chuewawong; Chilchitparyak Bootwansirina
Doubles	4	South Korea (KOR); Kim Hyeon-uk; Yoon Ji-yu	South Korea (KOR); Park Jin-cheol; Seo Su-yeon	Thailand (THA); Nattawut Thinathet; Suthida Saensathan
Doubles	7	South Korea (KOR); Jang Yeong-jin; Lee Mi-gyu	Thailand (THA); Yuttajak Glinbancheun; Wijittra Jaion	Indonesia (INA); Yayang Gunaya; Osrita Muslim
Doubles	7	South Korea (KOR); Jang Yeong-jin; Lee Mi-gyu	Thailand (THA); Yuttajak Glinbancheun; Wijittra Jaion	India (IND); Shubham Wadhwa; Bhavina Patel
Doubles	10	Indonesia (INA); Barce Layaba; Leli Marlina	South Korea (KOR); Kim Young-gun; Moon Sung-hye	China (CHN); Peng Zhengyang; Zhang Bian
Doubles	10	Indonesia (INA); Barce Layaba; Leli Marlina	South Korea (KOR); Kim Young-gun; Moon Sung-hye	South Korea (KOR); Park Jae-hyeon; Jung Young-a
Doubles	14	China (CHN); Yan Shuo; Wang Rui	China (CHN); Chen Chao; Huang Wenjuan	Hong Kong (HKG); Tong Chi Ming; Wong Yue Ching
Doubles	14	China (CHN); Yan Shuo; Wang Rui	China (CHN); Chen Chao; Huang Wenjuan	Thailand (THA); Phisit Wangphonphathanasiri; Kanokporn Phathumchai
Doubles	17	China (CHN); Zhao Shuai; Xiong Guiyan	Philippines (PHI); Jan Wilfred Redulla; Lhey Marie Manginsay	South Korea (KOR); Park Hong-kyu; Kim Kun-hea
Doubles	17	China (CHN); Zhao Shuai; Xiong Guiyan	Philippines (PHI); Jan Wilfred Redulla; Lhey Marie Manginsay	Japan (JPN); Koyo Iwabuchi; Yuri Tomono
Doubles	20	Chinese Taipei (TPE); Su Jin-sian; Lin Tzu-yu	Hong Kong (HKG); Wong Hon Lam; Lam Yan Yu	China (CHN); Lian Hao; Hou Chunxiao
Doubles	20	Chinese Taipei (TPE); Su Jin-sian; Lin Tzu-yu	Hong Kong (HKG); Wong Hon Lam; Lam Yan Yu	Kazakhstan (KAZ); Marat Surtubayev; Altynay Yerzhankyzy
Doubles	22	Japan (JPN); Takashi Asano; Natsuki Wada	South Korea (KOR); Kim Ga-tae; Seo Yang-hee	Hong Kong (HKG); Wang Wai Lok; Wong Pui Kei
Doubles	22	Japan (JPN); Takashi Asano; Natsuki Wada	South Korea (KOR); Kim Ga-tae; Seo Yang-hee	Hong Kong (HKG); Yuen King Shing; Wong Ting Ting
