= Athletics at the 2026 Asian Para Games =

Para Athletics at the 2026 Asian Para Games
- Venue: Nagoya City Mizuho Park Athletic Stadium
- Location: Nagoya, Japan
- Dates: 19–23 October 2026
- Competitors: 615 from 40 nations

Para Athletics at the 2026 Asian Para Games, which was held in Nagoya, Japan between 19 and 23 October 2026.

== Medal table ==
* Host nation (Japan)

Rank	NPC	Gold	Silver	Bronze	Total
1	China	54	24	20	98
2	India	22	19	24	65
3	Uzbekistan	20	21	23	64
4	Japan*	19	18	14	51
5	Iran	14	20	16	50
6	Saudi Arabia	8	6	0	14
7	Thailand	6	11	10	27
8	Iraq	4	5	5	14
9	Indonesia	3	8	11	22
10	South Korea	2	6	2	10
11	Malaysia	2	4	3	9
12	Sri Lanka	2	3	2	7
13	United Arab Emirates	2	2	3	7
14	Kuwait	1	0	2	3
15	Kazakhstan	0	2	2	4
16	Mongolia	0	2	0	2
17	Bahrain	0	1	2	3
18	Chinese Taipei	0	1	1	2
18	Qatar	0	1	1	2
20	Jordan	0	1	0	1
20	Pakistan	0	1	0	1
20	Timor-Leste	0	1	0	1
23	Philippines	0	0	2	2
23	Vietnam	0	0	2	2
25	Cambodia	0	0	1	1
25	Myanmar	0	0	1	1
25	Oman	0	0	1	1
Totals (27 entries)		159	157	148	464

== Medalists ==
=== Men ===
Event	Class	Gold		Silver		Bronze	
100 m	T11	Mohammed Ayade; Iraq	11.47	Taufik Abdul Karim; Indonesia	11.48	Chen Shichanng; China	11.52
100 m	T12	Ryutaro Kuno; Japan	10.85 AR	Daiki Ishiyama; Japan	10.92	Muhammad Mohd Rabi; Malaysia	11.16
100 m	T13	Jang Min-ho; South Korea	10.48 AR	Ryota Fukunaga; Japan	10.72	Shuta Kawakami; Japan	10.77
100 m	T33/T34	Chaiwat Rattana; Thailand	14.84 (989) GR	Ali Arshid; Qatar	14.95 (973)	Mohamad Othman; United Arab Emirates	15.13 (946)
100 m	T35	Alireza Zare; Iran	12.32 GR	Idrees Al-Zaidi; Iraq	12.69	Anubhav Choudhary; India	12.72
100 m	T36	Deng Peicheng; China	11.67 WR	Muhammad Putra; Indonesia	11.87	Doston Kahhorov; Uzbekistan	11.88
100 m	T37	Ali Alnakhli; Saudi Arabia	11.31 GR	Saptoyogo Purnomo; Indonesia	11.35	Rakeshbhai Bhatt; India	11.50
100 m	T38	Amornthep Phonpanna; Thailand	11.60	Ali Al-Rikabi; Iraq	11.70	Reza Hatamishooli; Iran	11.72
100 m	T44	Naif Almasrahi; Saudi Arabia	11.15 GR	Nuwan Indika; Sri Lanka	11.58	Sandeep; India	11.67
100 m	T47	Dilip Gavit; India	10.69	Mohammed Morssinganakath; India	10.72 GR	Shi Kangjun; China	10.80
100 m	T51/T52	Tomoki Sato; Japan	17.25 (892) GR	Yuki Oya; Japan	17.74 (809)	Tomoya Ito; Japan	18.23 (716)
100 m	T53	Jamaan Al-Zahrani; Saudi Arabia	14.26 GR	Pongsakorn Paeyo; Thailand	14.34	Masaberee Arsae; Thailand	15.23
100 m	T54	Athiwat Paeng-nuea; Thailand	13.49 WR	Albaraa Al-Qarni; Saudi Arabia	13.98	Van Vun; Cambodia	14.10
100 m	T63	Partin; Indonesia	12.37 GR	Phalathip Khamta; Thailand	12.72 GR	Hajime Kondo; Japan	13.32
100 m	T64	Kengo Oshima; Japan	11.39 GR	Denpoom Kotcharang; Thailand	11.78	Pranav Desai; India	11.96
100 m	T71/T72	Khurshid Kodirov; Uzbekistan	15.40 (934) AR	Mohammed al-Qahtani; Saudi Arabia	16.58 (662)	Mohamed Al-Haddar; Bahrain	22.99 (643) AR
200 m	T35	Alireza Zare; Iran	24.83 AR	Mohammed Khalaf; Iraq	25.60	Idrees Al-Zaidi; Iraq	26.02
200 m	T37	Ali Alnakhli; Saudi Arabia	23.32 GR	Saptoyogo Purnomo; Indonesia	23.45	Rakeshbhai Bhatt; India	23.64
200 m	T51/T52	Toyoma Ito; Japan	32.07 (850) GR	Jeong Jong-dae; South Korea	32.78 (784)	Peth Rungsri; Thailand	34.90 (564)
200 m	T64	Kengo Oshima; Japan	23.24 GR	Shunsuke Itani; Japan	23.52	Yuma Tamaki; Japan	24.05
400 m	T11	Chen Shichang; China	51.88	Mohammed Ayade; Iraq	52.07	Urganchbek Egamnazarov; Uzbekistan	52.99
400 m	T12	Daiki Ishiyama; Japan	50.49	Kissanapong Tisuwan; Thailand	50.62	Shakir Al-Gburi; Iraq	51.10
400 m	T13	Jang Min-ho; South Korea	46.24 WR	Ryota Fukunaga; Japan	47.98	Jakkarin Dammunee; Thailand	50.03
400 m	T20	Idris Sufyani; Saudi Arabia	48.25 GR	Muhammad Nor; Malaysia	48.34	Alfin Nomleni; Indonesia	49.18
400 m	T36	Doston Kahhorov; Uzbekistan	54.42 GR	Takeru Matsumoto; Japan	56.12	Ahmad Fizzi Rosni; Malaysia	56.68
400 m	T37	Thamer Al-Zahrani; Saudi Arabia	55.74	Saptoyogo Purnomo; Indonesia	56.22	Hashem Rastegarimobin; Iran	56.69
400 m	T35/T38	Mohammed Khalaf; Iraq	57.08 (1074)	Akira Banothu; India	51.25 (948)	Reza Hatamishooli; Iran	51.81 (920)
400 m	T47	Dilip Gavit; India	48.27	Kakeru Ishida; Japan	49.58	Marufjon Murodulloev; Uzbekistan	50.03
400 m	T47	Dilip Gavit; India	48.27	Kakeru Ishida; Japan	49.58	Saman Subasinghe; Sri Lanka	50.03
400 m	T51/T52	Tomoki Sato; Japan	55.42 (1038) GR	Tomoya Ito; Japan	1:01.83 (791)	Tatsuya Ito; Japan	1:03.69 (696)
400 m	T53	Pongsakorn Paeyo; Thailand	47.81 GR	Yang Shaoqiao; China	49.24	Yoo Byung-hoon; South Korea	50.15
400 m	T54	Jin Hua; China	44.70 GR	Dai Yunqiang; China	45.76	Athiwat Paeng-nuea; Thailand	46.11
400 m	T64	Sandeep; India	52.28 WR	Nour Alsana; Saudi Arabia	53.13	Ajay Kumar; India	53.61 GR
800 m	T33/T34	Wang Yang; China	1:40.62 (832) GR	Chaiwat Rattana; Thailand	1:40.87 (826)	Surasit Chansuwan; Thailand	1:43.09 (766)
800 m	T51/T52/T53	Pongsakorn Paeyo; Thailand	1:37.30 GR	Yang Shaoqiao; China	1:37.58	Setthawut Phueakfueang; Thailand	1:40.69
800 m	T54	Jin Hua; China	1:30.57 GR	Dai Yunqiang; China	1:30.91	Liu Yang; China	1:31.09
1500 m	T11	Kenya Karasawa; Japan	4:17.65 GR	Shinya Wada; Japan	4:23.77	Hamid Eslami; Iran	4:24.14
1500 m	T12/T13	Fakhriddin Khamraev; Uzbekistan	4:07.47 (688) GR	Nabeel Maqableh; Jordan	4:07.97 (680)	Sharath Makanahalli; India	4:11.01 (629)
1500 m	T20	Meshal Mahutan; Saudi Arabia	3:51.03 GR	Natsuki Toda; Japan	3:51.11	Yuki Iwata; Japan	3:56.70
1500 m	T38	Hotaka Kato; Japan	4:12.70 AR	Teofilo Freitas; Timor-Leste	4:25.39	Abbas Al-Darraji; Iraq	4:26.42
1500 m	T46	Wahumpurage Puwakpitikande; Sri Lanka	4:03.25 GR	Parmod Bijarnia; India	4:09.65	King James Reyes; Philippines	4:13.81
1500 m	T54	Jin Hua; China	2:59.51 GR	Luo Xingchuan; China	2:59.82	Putharet Khongrak; Thailand	3:00.10
5000 m	T11	Kenya Karasawa; Japan	15:20.46 GR	Shinya Wada; Japan	16:23.81	Lu Wenxuan; China	16:55.24
5000 m	T12/T13	Yudai Shimazu; Japan	14:13.95 (1010) GR	Tadashi Horikoshi; Japan	15:12.99 (792)	Yutaka Kumagai (athlete); Japan	15:14.16 (787)
5000 m	T54	Jin Hua; China	10:07.01 GR	Luo Xingchuan; China	10:07.23	Dai Yunqiang; China	10:07.40
High jump	T47	Nishad Kumar; India	2.04 GR	Muhammadabdulloh Tursunjonov; Uzbekistan	1.94	Angkarn Chanaboon; Thailand	1.75
High jump	T63	Shailesh Kumar; India	1.89 GR	Varun Singh Bhati; India	1.84	Rahul Saroha; India	1.81
High jump	T64	Praveen Kumar; India	2.05 GR	Banti; India	1.92	Temurbek Giyazov; Uzbekistan	1.86
Long jump	T11	Chen Shichang; China	6.64 GR	Urganchbek Egamnazarov; Uzbekistan	6.17	Kobiljon Shodiev; Uzbekistan	5.74
Long jump	T12	Wong Kar Gee; Malaysia	6.74	Sevinchbek Khusanov; Uzbekistan	6.54	Daiki Ishiyama; Japan	6.48
Long jump	T13	Ryota Fukunaga; Japan	6.93	Islam Salimov; Kazakhstan	6.30	Botir Mukhamedov; Uzbekistan	6.24
Long jump	T20	Abdul Latif Romly; Malaysia	7.39	Hassan Dawshi; Saudi Arabia	7.03	Kanta Kokubo; Japan	6.98
Long jump	T36	Yang Yifei; China	5.60 GR	Doston Kahhorov; Uzbekistan	5.42	Izzat Turgunov; Uzbekistan	5.33
Long jump	T37/T38	Zhong Huanghao; China	6.71 (945)	Ali Olfatnia; Iran	6.13 (896)	Sodikjon Mamadiev; Uzbekistan	5.69 (747)
Long jump	T47	Nishad Kumar; India	7.11	Omadbek Khasanov; Uzbekistan	6.99	Mohammadu Safran; Sri Lanka	6.55
Long jump	T42/T61/T63	Hajime Kondo; Japan	6.51 (734) GR	Phalathip Khamta; Thailand	6.41 (699)	Shailesh Kumar; India	5.57 (675) GR
Long jump	T44/T62/T64	Solariraj Dharmaraj; India	7.15 (807) AR	Eddy Bernard; Malaysia	6.34 (740) GR	Yuma Tamaki; Japan	6.89 (726)
Shot put	F11	Amirhossein Alipour; Iran	14.99 AR	Mahdi Olad; Iran	13.93	Praveen Sharma; India	13.86
Shot put	F12	Saman Pakbaz; Iran	13.52	Marcelino Michael; Indonesia	12.85	Diyorbek Umarov; Uzbekistan	12.54
Shot put	F20	Bader bin Ali; Saudi Arabia	17.08 GR	Muhammad Zolkefli; Malaysia	16.61	Aliff Mohamad Awi; Malaysia	14.45
Shot put	F32	Khurshid Kodirov; Uzbekistan	9.40 GR	Sunnat Botirov; Uzbekistan	9.06	Kang Oe-taek; South Korea	7.93
Shot put	F33	Mohammad Saber; Iran	10.95 GR	Hani Al-Nakhli; Saudi Arabia	10.00	Ahmed Al-Hosani; United Arab Emirates	9.76
Shot put	F34	Mehran Nikoee Majd; Iran	11.90	Mohammadtaha Beygrezaei; Iran	11.61	Abdulrahman Fiqi; Qatar	10.49
Shot put	F35	Khusniddin Norbekov; Uzbekistan	15.43	not awarded due to lack of competitors			
Shot put	F36	Barotjan Bakhtiyorov; Uzbekistan	15.98 GR	Dastan Mukashbekov; Kazakhstan	15.47	Ivan Zaleznyak; Kazakhstan	12.71
Shot put	F37	Kudratillokhon Marufkhujaev; Uzbekistan	16.66 GR	Tolibboy Yuldashev; Uzbekistan	15.79	Dhari Buti; Kuwait	12.53
Shot put	F40	Garrah Tnaiash; Iraq	10.78	Gan-erdene Gansukh; Mongolia	10.30	Ravi Rongali; India	10.02
Shot put	F41	Bobirjon Omonov; Uzbekistan	13.07 GR	Wildan Nukhailawi; Iraq	11.49	Sadegh Beit; Iran	10.85
Shot put	F46	Sachin Khilari; India	15.87 GR	Mohd Yasser; India	15.06	Parveen; India	14.94
Shot put	F53	Ayush Verma; India	8.16	Alizera Hemami; Iran	8.09	Makhambet Serikkaliyev; Kazakhstan	6.81
Shot put	F54/F55	Zhou Feifei; China	12.84 (1037) AR	Zafar Zaker; Iran	11.797 (963)	Hamed Amiri; Iran	10.97 (886)
Shot put	F56/F57	Yasin Khosravi; Iran	15.25 (1032) GR	Haidr Salamh; Saudi Arabia	14.97 (1018)	Hokato Hotozhe; India	14.65 (999)
Shot put	F42/F61/F63	Faisal Sorour; Kuwait	16.06 (1025) GR	Palitha Halgahawela; Sri Lanka	14.02 (872)	Mukhammad Rikhsimov; Uzbekistan	13.77 (847)
Club throw	F32	Khurshid Kodirov; Uzbekistan	36.11 GR	Kang Oe-taek; South Korea	33.91	Sunnat Botirov; Uzbekistan	33.67
Club throw	F51	Pranav Soorma; India	32.87 GR	Jung Ji-won; South Korea	28.40	Dharambir Nain; India	27.71
Discus throw	F11	Mahdi Olad; Iran	40.65	Hassan Bajoulvand; Iran	40.43	Amirhossein Alipour Darbeid; Iran	36.54
Discus throw	F37	Kudratillokhon Marufkhujaev; Uzbekistan	57.39 GR	Haider Ali; Pakistan	57.20	Haney; India	57.04
Discus throw	F51/F52/F53	Pranav Soorma; India	11.66 (932) AR	Ram Ratan Singh; India	10.35 (809)	Alireza Hamami; Iran	20.20 (749)
Discus throw	F54/F55/F56	Zhou Feifei; China	39.82 (1033) AR	Tsedensodnom Dorjzodov; Mongolia	36.99 (976)	Bunyod Kholmurodov; Uzbekistan	34.70 (919)
Discus throw	F57	I Kadek Yasa; Indonesia	49.75 WR	Yorkinbek Odilov; Uzbekistan	45.10	Hussein Khazaee; Iraq	45.06
Discus throw	F43/F44/F62/F64	Devender Kumar; India	49.71 (781)	Rakesh Kundu; India	49.35 (771)	Pardeep Kumar; India	51.15 (669)
Javelin throw	F12/F13	Yuta Wakoh; Japan	59.66 (914)	Manjeet Vyas; India	61.41 (838)	Kenta Wakoh; Japan	58.60 (783)
Javelin throw	F33/F34	Saeid Afrooz; Iran	42.58 (1097) WR	Mohammad Ebrahim; Iran	38.47 (1039)	Hussein Khafaji; Iraq	35.78 (986)
Javelin throw	F37/F38	Haney; India	60.49 (1116) WR	Hormoz Seidikazpounji; Iran	50.68 (1009)	Yu Chengjie; China	53.66 (943) AR
Javelin throw	F40/F41	Sadegh Beit Sayah; Iran	45.78 (992)	Ansyari; Indonesia	43.55 (948)	Navdeep Singh; India	42.55 (926)
Javelin throw	F46	Rinku Hooda; India	65.11	Ajeet Singh Yadav; India	65.02	Rizal Bagas Saktyono; Indonesia	55.30
Javelin throw	F53/F54	Erfan Bondori; Iran	30.24 (986) GR	Pradeep Kumar; India	27.45 (901)	Ayush Verma; India	17.88 (793)
Javelin throw	F55	Zhou Feifei; China	37.63 WR	Zafar Zaker; Iran	36.00	Sukhchain Dhankhar; India	29.94
Javelin throw	F56/F57	Yorkinbek Odilov; Uzbekistan	50.41 (1046) GR	Talantbek Kurbonov; Uzbekistan	48.81 (1024)	Amanolah Papi; Iran	48.07 (1013)
Javelin throw	F42–F44/F61–F64	Sumit Antil; India	72.46 (1112)	Mahendra Gurjar; India	59.03 (1066) GR	Sandip Sanjay Sargar; India	64.48 (1006) GR

=== Women ===
Event	Class	Gold		Silver		Bronze	
100 m	T11	Liu Cuiqing; China	12.03 GR	Liu Yiming; China	12.11	Asila Mirzayorova; Uzbekistan	12.73
100 m	T12	Simran Sharma; India	12.02 GR	Hajar Safarzadeh; Iran	12.30	Ni Made Putri; Indonesia	12.51
100 m	T13	Zhu Lin; China	12.93	Fatemehzahra Amiryousefi; Iran	13.03	Zhang Liyuan; China	13.26
100 m	T33/T34	Li Xiaoman; China	17.86 AR	Tang Sijia; China	18.36	not awarded due to lack of competitors	
100 m	T35	Zhou Xia; China	13.57 GR	Preeti Pal; India	13.98	not awarded due to lack of competitors	
100 m	T36	Shi Yiting; China	13.56 GR	Jeon Min-jae; South Korea	14.70	Vitasari; Indonesia	14.75
100 m	T37/T38	Wen Xiaoyan; China	12.95	Jiang Fenfen; China	13.48	Helin Wardina; Indonesia	13.69
100 m	T47	Shan Jie; China	12.36 AR	Sasirawan Inthachot; Thailand	12.48	Nanda Sholihah; Indonesia	12.53
100 m	T51/T52/T53	Gao Fang; China	16.41 GR	Zhou Hongzhuan; China	16.66	Rawan Al-Hasni; Oman	22.49
100 m	T54	Zhou Zhaoqian; China	16.33 GR	Zhang Yuan; China	16.55	not awarded due to lack of competitors	
100 m	T63	Karisma Evi Tiarani; Indonesia	14.59	Tomomi Tozawa; Japan	16.08	not awarded due to lack of competitors	
100 m	T64	Saki Takakuwa; Japan	13.43 AR	Chie Yamashita; Japan	13.94	Law Lar Win; Myanmar	14.67
100 m	T71/T72	Thekra Alkaabi; United Arab Emirates	23.55 (938)	Nabira Kaymatdinova; Uzbekistan	20.41 (449)	Makhliyo Akramova; Uzbekistan	21.66 (231)
200 m	T11	Liu Yiming; China	25.60	Asila Mirzayorova; Uzbekistan	25.86	Suneeporn Tanomwong; Thailand	26.70
200 m	T12	Simran Sharma; India	24.80 GR	Hajar Safarzadeh; Iran	25.02	Tajalben Damor; India	25.23
200 m	T35	Zhou Xia; China	28.03 GR	Preeti Pal; India	29.53	not awarded due to lack of competitors	
200 m	T36	Shi Yiting; China	28.65	Jeon Min-jae; South Korea	31.17	Vitasari; Indonesia	31.32
200 m	T37	Wen Xiaoyan; China	27.02	Jiang Fenfen; China	27.78	Helin Wardina; Indonesia	28.58
200 m	T47	Sasirawan Inthachot; Thailand	25.23 GR	Dhananjana Wickramasingha; Sri Lanka	25.80	Nanda Sholihah; Indonesia	25.93
400 m	T11	He Shanshan; China	1:00.07	Suneeporn Tanomwong; Thailand	1:00.19	Ravanni Valasanaini; India	1:03.64
400 m	T12	Hajar Safarzadeh; Iran	56.43 GR	Tejalben Damor; India	57.60	Shen Yaqin; China	58.04
400 m	T13	Zhu Lin; China	58.10 GR	Mana Sasaki; Japan	1:00.27	Luo Zhihan; China	1:02.56
400 m	T20	Deepthi Jeevanji; India	56.36 GR	Niina Kanno; Japan	58.92	Akane Kato; Japan	1:00.26
400 m	T38	Jiang Fenfen; China	1:04.65 (901) GR	not awarded due to lack of competitors			
400 m	T47	Anjanaben Bumbadiya; India	59.97 (848)	Jayanti Behera; India	1:00.65 (815)	Sasirawan Inthachot; Thailand	1:02.58 (714)
400 m	T53	Zhou Hongzhuan; China	55.17 GR	Gao Fang; China	55.79	not awarded due to lack of competitors	
400 m	T54	Zhou Zhaoqian; China	53.11 GR	Tian Yajuan; China	53.88	Zhang Yuan; China	57.34
800 m	T33/T34	Li Xiaoman; China	1:59.52 (887)	Tang Sijia; China	2:09.26 (699)	not awarded due to lack of competitors	
800 m	T51/T52/T53	Zhou Hongzhuan; China	1:50.22 (812) GR	Gao Fang; China	1:54.85 (708)	not awarded due to lack of competitors	
800 m	T54	Zhou Zhaoqian; China	1:49.27 GR	Chen Xiaochun; China	1:49.43	Tian Yajuan; China	1:50.78
1500 m	T11	He Shanshan; China	4:41.19 GR	Huang Zengli; China	4:55.54	Ravanni Valasanaini; India	5:41.85
1500 m	T12/T13	Soumya Kumar; India	5:12.39 (621)	Radha Venkatesh; India	5:30.90 (421)	Mana Sasaki; Japan	5:12.15 (336)
1500 m	T20	Hina Sawada; Japan	4:41.03 GR	Kako Okano; Japan	4:43.53	Yuna Fujiwara; Japan	4:59.56
1500 m	T54	Zhou Zhaoqian; China	3:22.40 GR	Chen Xiaochun; China	3:22.50	Deng Yirun; China	3:22.84
5000 m	T54	Tian Yajuan; China	11:51.09 GR	Chen Xiaochun; China	11:52.29	Deng Yirun; China	11:52.66
Long jump	T11	Asila Mirzayorova; Uzbekistan	5.04 GR	Zhou Guohua; China	4.88	Shahrizoda Temirova; Uzbekistan	4.73
Long jump	T12	Khusniya Olimjonova; Uzbekistan	5.46 GR	Yokutkhon Kholbekova; Uzbekistan	5.44	Fatemeh Amirzadegani; Iran	5.13
Long jump	T20	Rio Kawaguchi; Japan	5.36 GR	Im Yeong-ji; South Korea	5.10	Rica Oktavia; Indonesia	5.08
Long jump	T37/T38	Wen Xiaoyan; China	4.93 (1015)	Sabina Sukhanova; Uzbekistan	4.39 (818)	Shakhina Azimova; Uzbekistan	4.12 (672)
Long jump	T47	Dhananjana Wickramasingha; Sri Lanka	5.52 (874) GR	Nimisha Chakkungalparambil; India	5.47 (818)	Chen Jin; China	5.17 (734)
Long jump	T42/T44/T61–T64	Tomomi Tozawa; Japan	4.73 (842) GR	Kaede Maegawa; Japan	4.59 (778)	Karisma Evi Tiarani; Indonesia	3.91 (760)
Shot put	F11/F12	Zhao Yuping; China	12.13 (853)	Liu Ya-ting; Chinese Taipei	10.91 (716)	Xue Enhui; China	11.01 (666)
Shot put	F20	Reina Hori; Japan	13.57 AR	Siti Noraidah Suherman; Malaysia	11.41	Ma. Ravinia Carpena; Philippines	11.39
Shot put	F32	Noura Alketbi; United Arab Emirates	5.42	Parastoo Habibi; Iran	5.33	Thekra Alkaabi; United Arab Emirates	4.16
Shot put	F33	Wu Qing; China	7.63 GR	Atena Mohammadi Ha; Iran	6.85	Qian Zao; China	6.67
Shot put	F34	Zou Lijuan; China	9.07 GR	Bhagyashri Jadhav; India	8.19	Zuo Caiyun; China	7.56
Shot put	F35	Wang Jun; China	10.26	Dilafruzkhon Akhmatkhonova; Uzbekistan	9.05	Zuhro Fayzulloeva; Uzbekistan	7.57
Shot put	F36/F37	Mi Na; China	11.65	Fasai Yapakham; Thailand	10.21	Zokhira Kozokova; Uzbekistan	9.25
Shot put	F40	Madina Mukhtorova; Uzbekistan	9.10 AR	Maryam Al-Zeyoudi; United Arab Emirates	8.03	Farogat Mukhammadkulova; Uzbekistan	7.54
Shot put	F41	Navruza Akhmatova; Uzbekistan	10.02 GR	Kubaro Khakimova; Uzbekistan	9.71	Xie Nana; China	9.15
Shot put	F46	Karomat Omonova; Uzbekistan	13.16 AR	Zhang Jiamin; China	11.76	Shahinakhon Yigitalieva; Uzbekistan	11.72
Shot put	F53/F54	Elham Salehi; Iran	6.79 (819)	Shahla Hadidi; Iran	5.86 (624)	Malak Ali; Kuwait	4.98 (403)
Shot put	F55/F56/F57	Xu Mian; China	11.34 (1016) AR	Mohigul Sharobidinova; Uzbekistan	8.46 (998) AR	Rooba Al-Omari; Bahrain	7.45 (918) GR
Shot put	F42-F44/F62/F64	Wei Jia; China	10.66 (955) AR	Angelina Kolesnikova; Uzbekistan	10.36 (690)	Leila Kabgzan; Iran	10.26 (676)
Club throw	F32/F51	Makhliyo Akramova; Uzbekistan	24.08 (919) GR	Parastoo Habibi; Iran	23.32 (887)	Farzaneh Sohrabitabar; Iran	22.20 (851) AR
Discus throw	F11	Liang Hongxia; China	42.19 WR	Xue Enhui; China	40.73	Kosar Gharaeifarimani; Iran	37.15
Discus throw	F37/F38	Mi Na; China	36.65 (1050)	Fasai Yapakham; Thailand	28.01 (795)	Zokhira Kozokova; Uzbekistan	27.84 (788)
Discus throw	F40	Madina Mukhtorova; Uzbekistan	25.59 GR	Maryam Al-Zeyoudi; United Arab Emirates	22.62	Farogat Mukhammadkulova; Uzbekistan	21.25
Discus throw	F41	Navruza Akhmatova; Uzbekistan	30.11 AR	Kubaro Khakimova; Uzbekistan	25.05	not awarded due to lack of competitors	
Discus throw	F51/F52/F53	Zahraa Al-Shadood; Iraq	11.88 (859) GR	Hanan Kaab Omeir; Iran	10.36 (704)	Farzaneh Sohrabitabar; Iran	10.93 (668) AR
Discus throw	F54	Suvarna Raj; India	15.66	Shahla Hadidi; Iran	15.45	Nguyễn Thị Ngọc Thúy; Vietnam	14.65
Discus throw	F55	Dong Feixia; China	26.11 GR	Rooba Al-Omari; Bahrain	22.81	Karamjyoti Dalal; India	21.60
Discus throw	F56/F57	Lai Xiaojuan; China	25.33 (1040) AR	Mohigul Sharobidinova; Uzbekistan	25.12 (1034)	Faezeh Dibaei; Iran	24.51 (1017)
Discus throw	F43/F44/F62/F64	Wei Jia; China	31.92 (773) AR	Lia Priyanti; Indonesia	30.41 (655)	Angelina Kolesnikova; Uzbekistan	30.10 (642)
Javelin throw	F12/F13	Zhao Yuping; China	44.31 (990)	Yokutkhon Kholbekova; Uzbekistan	32.43 (681)	Liu Ya-ting; Chinese Taipei	31.07 (632)
Javelin throw	F33/F34	Zou Lijuan; China	22.01 (1034)	Qian Zao; China	15.48 (1031) GR	Zuo Caiyun; China	19.54 (934)
Javelin throw	F46	Shahinakhon Yigitalieva; Uzbekistan	44.99 (1015) AR	Husnorakhon Kudratullaeva; Uzbekistan	41.91 (960)	Huang Yezi; China	39.59 (910)
Javelin throw	F52/F53/F54	Elham Salehi; Iran	16.44 (845)	Masoumeh Tourani; Iran	14.99 (735)	Nguyễn Thị Ngọc Thúy; Vietnam	12.16 (469)
Javelin throw	F55/F56	Lai Xiaojuan; China	26.81 (1078) WR	Zeinab Moradi; Iran	22.96 (965)	Hashemiyeh Motaghian; Iran	22.94 (964)

== Nations ==
Each nation Maximum 60

615 players from 40 nations participate this event.

1. Bahrain (10)
2. Bangladesh (4)
3. Cambodia (3)
4. China (61)
5. Hong Kong (14)
6. India (62)
7. Indonesia (25)
8. Iran (43)
9. Iraq (15)
10. Japan (53)
11. Jordan (4)
12. Kazakhstan (14)
13. South Korea (16)
14. Kuwait (5)
15. Kyrgyzstan (6)
16. Laos (1)
17. Lebanon (1)
18. Macau (5)
19. Malaysia (24)
20. Maldives (3)
21. Mongolia (11)
22. Myanmar (5)
23. Nepal (7)
24. Oman (12)
25. Pakistan (4)
26. Philippines (16)
27. Palestine (2)
28. Qatar (4)
29. Saudi Arabia (22)
30. Singapore (2)
31. Sri Lanka (14)
32. Syria (2)
33. Chinese Taipei (10)
34. Tajikistan (3)
35. Thailand (52)
36. Timor-Leste (3)
37. United Arab Emirates (11)
38. Uzbekistan (58)
39. Vietnam (7)
40. Yemen (1)
