= Philippines at the 2026 Asian Para Games =

- IPC code: PHI
- NPC: Paralympic Committee of the Philippines

in Aichi–Nagoya, Japan 18–24 October 2026
- Competitors: 69 (52 men and 17 women) in 11 sports
- Flag bearers: Allain Ganapin (taekwondo); Lhey Marie Manginsay (table tennis)
- Medals Ranked 17th: Gold 2 Silver 2 Bronze 3 Total 7

Asian Para Games appearances (overview)
- 2010; 2014; 2018; 2022; 2026

The Philippines competed at the 2026 Asian Para Games in the Aichi Prefecture and Nagoya, Japan from 18 to 24 October 2026.

The delegation garnered two gold, two silver, and three bronze medals.

== Background ==
With the removal of chess, the Philippine delegation at the 2026 Asian Para Games expected difficulties replicating its ten-gold medal finish in the 2022 games in Hangzhou, China. Eight of ten came from chess.

Officials have adjusted their target four to five gold medals for this edition of the games.

The delegation of 69 athletes was led by chef de mission Francis Diaz. Para-swimmer Ernie Gawilan was the only gold medalist from the previous edition. At the opening ceremony, the flagbearers were Lhey Manginsay of para table tennis and Allain Ganapin of taekwondo.

== Competitors ==
The following is the list of number of competitors participating in the Games:

Sport	Men	Women	Total
Archery	2	2	4
Athletics	11	5	16
Badminton	2	1	3
Cycling	3	0	3
Judo	2	0	2
Powerlifting	3	2	5
Swimming	11	2	13
Table tennis	3	3	6
Taekwondo	1	0	1
Wheelchair basketball	12	0	12
Wheelchair fencing	2	2	4
Total	52	17	69

== Medalists ==
=== Gold ===
No.	Medal	Name	Sport	Event	Date
1	Gold	Ernie Gawilan	Swimming	Men's 400 m freestyle S7	19 October
2	Gold	Ariel Alegarbes	Swimming	Men's 100 m backstroke S14	20 October

=== Silver ===
No.	Medal	Name	Sport	Event	Date
1	Silver	Ernie Gawilan	Swimming	Men's 200 m individual medley SM7	20 October
2	Silver	Lhey Manginsay; Wilfred Redulla	Table tennis	Mixed doubles – Class XD17	22 October

=== Bronze ===
No.	Medal	Name	Sport	Event	Date
1	Bronze	Raemond Adefuin	Swimming	Men's 100 m breaststroke SB6	19 October
2	Bronze	King James Reyes	Athletics	Men's 1500 m T46	23 October
3	Bronze	Ma. Ravinia Carpena	Athletics	Women's shot put F20	23 October

=== Multiple ===
Name	Sport	Gold	Silver	Bronze	Total
Ernie Gawilan	Swimming	1	1	0	2

== Medal summary ==
=== By sports ===
Medals by sports
Sport	1st place, gold medalist(s)	2nd place, silver medalist(s)	3rd place, bronze medalist(s)	Total
Swimming	2	1	1	4
Table tennis	0	1	0	1
Athletics	0	0	2	2
Total	2	2	3	7

=== By date ===
Day	Date	1st place, gold medalist(s)	2nd place, silver medalist(s)	3rd place, bronze medalist(s)	Total
1	19 October	1	0	1	2
2	20 October	1	1	0	2
3	21 October	0	0	0	0
4	22 October	0	1	0	1
5	23 October	0	0	2	2
6	24 October	0	0	0	0
Total		2	2	3	7

== Archery ==
Men's

Athlete	Event	Ranking round		Round of 32	Round of 16	Quarterfinals	Semifinals	Final / BM	
Athlete	Event	Score	Seed	Opposition Score	Opposition Score	Opposition Score	Opposition Score	Opposition Score	Rank
Marzel Burgos	Individual compound	675	15 Q	Kirgizboev (UZB); W 140–137	Ai X. (CHN); L 142–147	Did not advance			
Giovanni Ola	Individual recurve	584	15 Q	Kishen (KAZ); L 4–6	Did not advance				

Women's

Athlete	Event	Ranking round		Round of 32	Round of 16	Quarterfinals	Semifinals	Final / BM	
Athlete	Event	Score	Seed	Opposition Score	Opposition Score	Opposition Score	Opposition Score	Opposition Score	Rank
Agustina Bantiloc	Individual compound	666	8 Q	Bye	Zhao J. (CHN); W 140–136	Devi (IND); L 135–147	Did not advance		
Jannah Ballesta	Individual W1	553	6 Q	—N/a		Kim O-g (KOR); L 5–6	Did not advance		

Mixed

Athlete	Event	Ranking round		Quarterfinals	Semifinals	Final / BM	
Athlete	Event	Score	Seed	Opposition Score	Opposition Score	Opposition Score	Rank
Agustina Bantiloc; Marzel Burgos	Team compound	1341	5 Q	Chinese Taipei (TPE); L 147–148	Did not advance		

== Athletics ==
=== Men's ===
Road and track

Athlete	Event	Heats		Final	
Athlete	Event	Result	Rank	Result	Rank
Arman Dino	100 m T47	11.44	8 q	11.34 PB	7
Jae Phillipe Arce	400 m T20	57.32	7 q	57.71	8
Arman Dino	400 m T47	56.67	10	Did not advance	
Cyril Ongcoy	1500 m T12/13	—N/a		4:23.19 PB	4
King James Reyes	1500 m T46	—N/a		4:13.81 PB	3rd place, bronze medalist(s)

Field

Athlete	Event	Final	
Athlete	Event	Result	Rank
Evaristo Carbonel	Discus throw F11	27.18 SB	5
Andrei Kuizon	Discus throw F54/55/56	21.01	8
Joshua Santos	High jump T47	NM	
Edwin Enguito Jr.	High jump T63	1.60	4
Wilson Sante Jr.	High jump T64	1.83 PB	4
Rocky Logroño	Javelin throw F40/41	28.52	7
Andrei Kuizon	Javelin throw F53/54	20.84	5
Joel Balatucan	Javelin throw F55	22.72	6
Jae Phillipe Arce	Long jump T20	6.56	5
Joshua Santos	Long jump T47	NM	
Rocky Logroño	Shot put F40	7.53	6
Joel Balatucan	Shot put F54/55	6.74	8
Andrei Kuizon	Shot put F54/55	7.48	7

=== Women's ===
Field

Athlete	Event	Qualification		Final	
Athlete	Event	Result	Rank	Result	Rank
Alyana Nuñez	Discus throw F11	—N/a		28.77	4
Rosalie Torrefiel	Discus throw F11	—N/a		21.58 PB	7
Jesebel Tordecilla	Discus throw F55	—N/a		13.22	5
Cendy Asusano	Javelin throw F55/56	13.91	2 q	14.81	8
Jesebel Tordecilla	Javelin throw F55/56	12.80	4 q	13.02	9
Alyana Nuñez	Shot put F11/12	—N/a		7.62	6
Rosalie Torrefiel	Shot put F11/12	—N/a		5.83	8
Ma. Ravinia Carpena	Shot put F20	—N/a		11.39 PB	3rd place, bronze medalist(s)

== Badminton ==
Men

Athlete	Event	Group Stage	Rank	Quarterfinals	Semifinals	Final	Rank
Athlete	Event	Opposition Result	Rank	Opposition Result	Opposition Result	Opposition Result	Rank
Khian Urbano	Singles SL3	Yi Y. (CHN); L (1–21, 8–21)	3	Did not advance			
Khian Urbano	Singles SL3	Kumar (IND); L (10–21, 12–21)	3	Did not advance			
John Maclang	Singles SH6	Solaimalai (IND); L (7–21, 6–21)	4	Did not advance			
John Maclang	Singles SH6	Zali (BRU); L (18–21, 10–21)	4	Did not advance			
John Maclang	Singles SH6	Wong Ch.Y. (HKG); L (3–21, 7–21)	4	Did not advance			

Women

Athlete	Event	Group Stage	Rank	Quarterfinals	Semifinals	Final	Rank
Athlete	Event	Opposition Result	Rank	Opposition Result	Opposition Result	Opposition Result	Rank
Kathleen Pedrosa	Singles SL4	Cheng H. (CHN); L (2–21, 5–21)	4	Did not advance			
Kathleen Pedrosa	Singles SL4	Srinavakul (THA); L (8–21, 13–21)	4	Did not advance			
Kathleen Pedrosa	Singles SL4	Sadiyah (INA); L (3–21, 6–21)	4	Did not advance			

Mixed

Athlete	Event	Group Stage	Rank	Quarterfinals	Semifinals	Final	Rank
Athlete	Event	Opposition Result	Rank	Opposition Result	Opposition Result	Opposition Result	Rank
Kathleen Pedrosa; Khian Urbano	Doubles SL3–SU5	Li M. Xiao Z. (CHN); L (13–21, 5–21)	4	Did not advance			
Kathleen Pedrosa; Khian Urbano	Doubles SL3–SU5	Sadiyah; Setiawan (INA); L (8–21, 13–21)	4	Did not advance			
Kathleen Pedrosa; Khian Urbano	Doubles SL3–SU5	Joshi; Ragupathi (IND); L (5–21, 15–21)	4	Did not advance			

== Cycling ==
=== Road ===
Men

Athlete	Event	Heats		Final	
Athlete	Event	Result	Rank	Result	Rank
Artus Bucay	C4-5 1000 m time trial	1:19.496	14	Did not advance	
Artus Bucay	C4-5 road race	—N/a		1:53:04	8
Gerald Patrick Lee	C1-5 time trial	—N/a		29:56.56	15
Gerald Patrick Lee	C4-5 1000 m time trial	1:14.888	12	Did not advance	
Gerald Patrick Lee	C4-5 road race	—N/a		–1LAP	10
Nikko Peralta	C1-5 time trial	—N/a		28:51.38	12
Nikko Peralta	C4-5 road race	—N/a		1:52:34	6

=== Track ===
Men

Athlete	Event	Heats		Final	
Athlete	Event	Result	Rank	Result	Rank
Gerald Patrick Lee	C5 4000 m individual pursuit	5:09.605	8	Did not advance	
Nikko Peralta	C4 4000 m individual pursuit	5:14.411	4 QB	OVL	4

== Judo ==
Athlete	Event	Round of 16	Quarterfinals	Semifinals	Repechage 1	Repechage 2	Final / BM	
Athlete	Event	Opposition Result	Opposition Result	Opposition Result	Opposition Result	Opposition Result	Opposition Result	Rank
Edmond Montecillo	Men's J1 −70 kg	Akbarov (UZB); L 000–101	Did not advance					
Al Jaed Pacheo	Men's J1 −81 kg	Borchlou (IRI); L 000–100	Did not advance					

== Powerlifting ==
Men

Athlete	Event	Attempt 1	Attempt 2	Attempt 3	Total	Rank
Jules Empizo	59 kg	~~158~~	158	~~162~~	158	8
Carlo Nuyda	88 kg	127	135	140	140	9
Jeffrey Jaramillo	97 kg	145	150	~~153~~	150	9

Women

Athlete	Event	Attempt 1	Attempt 2	Attempt 3	Total	Rank
Marydol Pamati-an	41 kg	~~81~~	~~81~~	82	82	5
Achelle Guion	45 kg	70	75	~~80~~	75	6

== Swimming ==
Men

Athlete	Event	Heats		Final	
Athlete	Event	Result	Rank	Result	Rank
Marco Tinamisan	50m freestyle S4	49.97	5 Q	51.36	5
Marco Tinamisan	100m freestyle S4	—N/a		1:47.34	5
Gary Bejino	50m butterfly S6	37.82	6 Q	35.85	6
Gary Bejino	50m freestyle S6	35.93	7 Q	34.53	7
Gary Bejino	100m freestyle S6	1:14.19	4 Q	1:14.74	6
Gary Bejino	400m freestyle S6	5:54.50	6 Q	5:44.12	5
Raemond Adefuin	50m butterfly S6	35.75	4 Q	35.07	5
Raemond Adefuin	100m backstroke S6	1:29.80	4 Q	1:28.68	5
Raemond Adefuin	100m breaststroke SB6	—N/a		1:30.76	3rd place, bronze medalist(s)
Raemond Adefuin	100m freestyle S6	1:30.20	10 R	Did not advance	
Raemond Adefuin	200m individual medley SM6	—N/a		3:08.53	6
Ernie Gawilan	100m backstroke S7	1:25.18	5 Q	1:25.58	7
Ernie Gawilan	200m individual medley SM7	—N/a		2:52.72	2nd place, silver medalist(s)
Ernie Gawilan	400m freestyle S7	—N/a		4:56.72	1st place, gold medalist(s)
Edwin Villanueva	100m breaststroke SB7	—N/a		1:46.98	6
Edwin Villanueva	100m backstroke S8	—N/a		1:31.27	8
Edwin Villanueva	400m freestyle S8	6:22.33	10 R	Did not advance	
Arnel Aba	100m butterfly S9	1:33.77	13	Did not advance	
Arnel Aba	400m freestyle S9	5:42.73	9 R	Did not advance	
Roland Sabido	50m freestyle S9	32.21	13	Did not advance	
Roland Sabido	100m backstroke S9	1:19.17	10 R	Did not advance	
Roland Sabido	400m freestyle S9	5:28.16	8 Q	5:24.23	8
Muhaimin Ulag	50m freestyle S9	33.28	14	Did not advance	
Muhaimin Ulag	100m breaststroke SB9	1:24.29	8 Q	1:24.74	8
Muhaimin Ulag	200m individual medley SM9	3:04.30	12	Did not advance	
Ric Pasadilla	100m breaststroke SB9	DNS		Did not advance	
Ric Pasadilla	100m backstroke S10	—N/a		1:09.27	4
Ric Pasadilla	100m butterfly S10	—N/a		DNS	
Ric Pasadilla	200m individual medley SM10	—N/a		2:30.34	6
Ric Pasadilla	400m freestyle S10	—N/a		DNS	
Ariel Alegarbes	100m backstroke S14	1:01.84	2 Q	1:01.56	1st place, gold medalist(s)
Ariel Alegarbes	100m butterfly S14	59.20	5 Q	58.93	5
Ariel Alegarbes	200m individual medley SM14	2:19.95	7 Q	2:18.45	7
Kent Marcos	100m backstroke S14	1:09.58	11	Did not advance	
Kent Marcos	100m butterfly S14	1:04.99	12	Did not advance	
Kent Marcos	100m breaststroke SB14	1:13.46	11	Did not advance	

Women

Athlete	Event	Heats		Final	
Athlete	Event	Result	Rank	Result	Rank
Angel Otom	50m backstroke S5	—N/a		46.70	4
Angel Otom	50m freestyle S5	—N/a		49.71	7
Angel Otom	50m butterfly S6	—N/a		45.45	5
Beariza Roble	50m freestyle S6	47.76	6 Q	46.84	6
Beariza Roble	100m freestyle S6	1:44.08	7 Q	1:39.30	7

Mixed

Athlete	Event	Final	
Athlete	Event	Result	Rank
Gary Bejino; Angel Otom; Beariza Roble; Marco Tinamisan	4 × 50m freestyle 20 points	2:59.79	4

== Table tennis ==
Men

Athlete	Event	Group Stage				Round of 16	Quarterfinals	Semifinals	Final	
Athlete	Event	Opposition Result	Opposition Result	Opposition Result	Rank	Opposition Result	Opposition Result	Opposition Result	Opposition Result	Rank
Smith Billy Cartera	Singles C4–5	Peng Zh. (CHN); L 0–3	Purevdorj (MGL); W 3–0	—N/a	2 Q	Chanphaka (THA); L 0–3	Did not advance			
Leo Macalanda	Singles C6	Chen Ch. (CHN); L 0–3	Al-Sarraji (IRQ); L 0–3	—N/a	3	Did not advance				
Wilfred Redulla	Singles C8	Wangphonphathanasiri (THA); L 0–3	Mulyo (INA); W WO	—N/a	2 Q	—N/a	Makhulbekov (KAZ); L 2–3	Did not advance		
Leo Macalanda; Wilfred Redulla	Doubles CMD14	Khudyakov; Orazbek (KAZ); W 3–1	Jon J-h; Kim Y-r (PRK); L 0–3	Liao K. Yan Sh. (CHN); L 1–3	3	—N/a		Did not advance		

Women

Athlete	Event	Group Stage				Round of 16	Quarterfinals	Semifinals	Final	
Athlete	Event	Opposition Result	Opposition Result	Opposition Result	Rank	Opposition Result	Opposition Result	Opposition Result	Opposition Result	Rank
Noriko Batuhan	Singles C3	Asayut (THA); L 0–3	Muslim (INA); W 3–0	Huang Zh. (CHN); L 1–3	3	Did not advance				
Jhona Peña	Singles C7	Wang R. (CHN); L 2–3	Soares (TLS); W 3–0	Kim S-o (KOR); L 0–3	3	Did not advance				
Lhey Manginsay	Singles C9	Mao J. (CHN); L 0–3	Nurbekova (TJK); W 3–0	Kim K-h (KOR); L 0–3	3	Did not advance				
Lhey Manginsay; Jhona Peña	Doubles CWD20	Miura; Tomono (JPN); L 1–3	Tash; Yerzhanzyky (KAZ); W 3–2	—N/a	2 Q	—N/a	Mao J. Wang R. (CHN); L 2–3	Did not advance		

Mixed

Athlete	Event	Group Stage				Quarterfinals	Semifinals	Final	
Athlete	Event	Opposition Result	Opposition Result	Opposition Result	Rank	Opposition Result	Opposition Result	Opposition Result	Rank
Noriko Batuhan; Smith Billy Cartera	Doubles CXD7	Patel; Wadhwa (IND); L 0–3	Alkhalaf; Alotaibi (KUW); W 3–0	Gunaya; Muslim (INA); L 2–3	3	Did not advance			
Leo Macalanda; Jhona Peña	Doubles CXD14	Wang R. Yan Sh. (CHN); L 1–3	Pang W.K. Tong Ch.Y. (HKG); L 0–3	Chaiwut; Thainiyom (THA); L 0–3	4	Did not advance			
Lhey Manginsay; Wilfred Redulla	Doubles CXD17	Xiong G. Zhao Sh. (CHN); L 0–3	Al-Dayyeni; Shafeeq (IRQ); W 3–1	—N/a	2 Q	Ajjanakatti; Chougule (IND); W 3–2	Iwabuki; Tomono (JPN); W 3–2	Xiong G. Zhao Sh. (CHN); L 1–3	2nd place, silver medalist(s)

== Taekwondo ==
Athlete	Event	Quarterfinals	Semifinals	Repechage	Final / BM	
Athlete	Event	Opposition Result	Opposition Result	Opposition Result	Opposition Result	Rank
Allain Ganapin	Men's –80 kg K44	Pourrahnama (IRI); L 0–2	Did not advance	Amatov (UZB); L 1–2	Did not advance	

== Wheelchair basketball ==
The Philippine national team will take part in the wheelchair basketball tournament.

Summary

Team	Event	Group Stage				Quarterfinals	Classification Round		
Team	Event	Opposition Score	Opposition Score	Opposition Score	Rank	Opposition Score	Opposition Score	Opposition Score	Rank
Philippines men's	Men's tournament	South Korea; L 31–84	Iraq; L 35–72	Iran; L 45–71	4 Q	Japan; L 16–88	China; L 59–61	Kuwait; L 53–61	8

== Wheelchair fencing ==
Men

Athlete	Event	Round of Pool		Round of 32	Round of 16	Quarterfinals	Semifinals	Final	
Athlete	Event	Result	Rank	Opposition Score	Opposition Score	Opposition Score	Opposition Score	Opposition Score	Rank
Wilfredo Bugayong II	Épée A								
Wilfredo Bugayong II	Épée A	Lee T-g (KOR); L 1–5	4 Q	Diantoro (INA); L 9–15	Did not advance				
Wilfredo Bugayong II	Épée A	Cheng Y. (CHN); L 0–5	4 Q	Diantoro (INA); L 9–15	Did not advance				
Wilfredo Bugayong II	Épée A	Lee Sh.H. (HKG); W 5–2	4 Q	Diantoro (INA); L 9–15	Did not advance				
Wilfredo Bugayong II	Épée A	Sudjai (THA); L 4–5	4 Q	Diantoro (INA); L 9–15	Did not advance				
Wilfredo Bugayong II	Épée A	Nakagawa (JPN); W 5–0	4 Q	Diantoro (INA); L 9–15	Did not advance				
Wilfredo Bugayong II	Sabre A								
Wilfredo Bugayong II	Sabre A	Kaveekat (THA); L 4–5	4 Q	Le Sh.H. (HKG); W 15–5	Cheng Y. (CHN); L 6–15	Did not advance			
Wilfredo Bugayong II	Sabre A	Zhong S. (CHN); L 0–5	4 Q	Le Sh.H. (HKG); W 15–5	Cheng Y. (CHN); L 6–15	Did not advance			
Wilfredo Bugayong II	Sabre A	Sim J-h (KOR); W 5–0	4 Q	Le Sh.H. (HKG); W 15–5	Cheng Y. (CHN); L 6–15	Did not advance			
Wilfredo Bugayong II	Sabre A	Yasu (JPN); L 2–5	4 Q	Le Sh.H. (HKG); W 15–5	Cheng Y. (CHN); L 6–15	Did not advance			
Allen Coycoyen	Épée B								
Allen Coycoyen	Épée B	Hu D. (CHN); L 0–5	7	—N/a	Did not advance				
Allen Coycoyen	Épée B	Kim D-h (KOR); L 2–5	7	—N/a	Did not advance				
Allen Coycoyen	Épée B	Feng Y. (CHN); L 2–5	7	—N/a	Did not advance				
Allen Coycoyen	Épée B	Qin B. (CHN); L 1–5	7	—N/a	Did not advance				
Allen Coycoyen	Épée B	Jusipbaev (UZB); L 1–5	7	—N/a	Did not advance				
Allen Coycoyen	Épée B	Alnezari (IRQ); L 0–5	7	—N/a	Did not advance				
Allen Coycoyen	Sabre A								
Allen Coycoyen	Sabre A	Afandi (INA); L 0–5	7	Did not advance					
Allen Coycoyen	Sabre A	Wang J. (CHN); L 2–5	7	Did not advance					
Allen Coycoyen	Sabre A	Tsunoda (JPN); L 1–5	7	Did not advance					
Allen Coycoyen	Sabre A	Zhu F. (CHN); L 2–5	7	Did not advance					
Allen Coycoyen	Sabre A	Ryu E-h (KOR); L 0–5	7	Did not advance					
Allen Coycoyen	Sabre A	Leung S.L. (HKG); L 0–5	7	Did not advance					

Women

Athlete	Event	Round of Pool		Round of 32	Round of 16	Quarterfinals	Semifinals	Final	
Athlete	Event	Result	Rank	Opposition Score	Opposition Score	Opposition Score	Opposition Score	Opposition Score	Rank
Marlyn Garrucho	Épée A								
Marlyn Garrucho	Épée A	Li Y. (CHN); L 1–5	5 Q	Rakhmanova (UZB); L 8–15	Did not advance				
Marlyn Garrucho	Épée A	Matsumoto (JPN); L 2–5	5 Q	Rakhmanova (UZB); L 8–15	Did not advance				
Marlyn Garrucho	Épée A	Lamasano (INA); W 5–4	5 Q	Rakhmanova (UZB); L 8–15	Did not advance				
Marlyn Garrucho	Épée A	Tang Ch.Ch. (HKG); W 2–1	5 Q	Rakhmanova (UZB); L 8–15	Did not advance				
Marlyn Garrucho	Épée A	Rakhmanova (UZB); L 4–5	5 Q	Rakhmanova (UZB); L 8–15	Did not advance				
Marlyn Garrucho	Sabre A								
Marlyn Garrucho	Sabre A	Peng Q. (CHN); L 1–5	5	Did not advance					
Marlyn Garrucho	Sabre A	Lao I.I. (MAC); L 0–5	5	Did not advance					
Marlyn Garrucho	Sabre A	Lamasano (INA); W 5–3	5	Did not advance					
Marlyn Garrucho	Sabre A	Matsumoto (JPN); L 1–5	5	Did not advance					
Violeta Sapalit	Épée B								
Violeta Sapalit	Épée B	Abdullaeva (UZB); L 4–5	5	—N/a	Did not advance				
Violeta Sapalit	Épée B	Raouf (IRQ); L 2–5	5	—N/a	Did not advance				
Violeta Sapalit	Épée B	Kang S. (CHN); L 4–5	5	—N/a	Did not advance				
Violeta Sapalit	Épée B	Srithong (THA); L 3–5	5	—N/a	Did not advance				
Violeta Sapalit	Sabre B								
Violeta Sapalit	Sabre B	Tong Ng.T. (HKG); L 2–5	6	—N/a	Kim Y-j (KOR); L 6–15	Did not advance			
Violeta Sapalit	Sabre B	Geng T. (CHN); L 3–5	6	—N/a	Kim Y-j (KOR); L 6–15	Did not advance			
Violeta Sapalit	Sabre B	Jana (THA); L 2–5	6	—N/a	Kim Y-j (KOR); L 6–15	Did not advance			
Violeta Sapalit	Sabre B	Abdullaeva (UZB); W 5–2	6	—N/a	Kim Y-j (KOR); L 6–15	Did not advance			
Violeta Sapalit	Sabre B	Kang S. (CHN); L 2–5	6	—N/a	Kim Y-j (KOR); L 6–15	Did not advance			
Violeta Sapalit	Sabre B	Jo Y-j (KOR); L 1–5	6	—N/a	Kim Y-j (KOR); L 6–15	Did not advance			

Mixed

Athlete	Event	Quarterfinals	Semifinals	5th place match	
Athlete	Event	Opposition Score	Opposition Score	Opposition Score	Rank
Wilfredo Bugayong II; Allen Coycoyen; Marlyn Garrucho; Violeta Sapalit	Team sabre	Thailand (THA); L 5–20	Did not advance	Uzbekistan (UZB); W 20–19	5
