= Nepal at the 2026 Asian Para Games =

- Nepalese flag
- IPC code: NEP
- NPC: National Paralympic Committee Nepal
- Website: www.paralympic.org.np

in Aichi-Nagoya, Japan 18 October 2026 – 24 October 2026
- Competitors: 22 (13 men and 9 women) in 7 sports
- Flag bearer (closing): TBD
- Medals: Gold 0 Silver 0 Bronze 0 Total 0

Asian Para Games appearances
- 2010; 2014; 2018; 2022; 2026

Nepal is participating in the 2026 Asian Para Games, to be held in Nagoya, Aichi Prefecture, Japan, from 18 to 24 October 2026. This will be Nepal's fifth appearance at the Games.

== Competitors ==
Following is the list of sports and number of athletes that will participate in the upcoming edition:

Sport	Men	Women	Total
Athletics	5	2	7
Badminton	1	-	1
Powerlifting	1	1	2
Swimming	1	1	2
Table tennis	4	3	7
Taekwondo	-	2	2
Wheelchair Tennis	1	-	1
Total	13	9	22

== Athletics ==
Track events
Men

Athlete	Event	Class	Heat		Final	
Athlete	Event	Class	Result	Rank	Result	Rank
Nawaraj Karki	100 m	T47	16.31	19	Did not advance	
Chet Khanal	100 m	T47	13.07	17	Did not advance	
Nawaraj Karki	400 m	T47				
Chet Kanal	1500 m	T46				

Women

Athlete	Event	Class	Heat		Final	
Athlete	Event	Class	Result	Rank	Result	Rank
Shristi Dhewaju	100 m	T47	21 Oct			
Prabha Angedembe	400 m	T47				

Field events
Men

Athlete	Event	Class	Qualification		Final	
Athlete	Event	Class	Result	Rank	Result	Rank
Himal Aryal	Shot put	F54/F55	Cancelled			
Raju Gurung	Discus throw	F54/55/56				
Mohan Roka	Javelin throw	F56/F57				

Women

Athlete	Event	Class	Qualification		Final	
Athlete	Event	Class	Result	Rank	Result	Rank
Prabha Angedembe	Long jump	T47				

== Badminton ==
Singles

Athlete	Event	Group stage				Round of 16	Quarterfinals	Semifinals	Final	
Athlete	Event	Opposition Score	Opposition Score	Opposition Score	Rank	Opposition Score	Opposition Score	Opposition Score	Opposition Score	Rank
Prakash Adhikari	Men's SL4	Teamarrom (THA) L 0-2 (10-21, 18-21)	Yeh (TPE) L 0-2 (15-21, 12-21)	Sakhuja (IND) L 0-2 (11-21, 12,21)	Did not advance					

== Powerlifting ==
=== Men ===
Athlete	Event	Attempt 1	Attempt 2	Attempt 3	Total	Rank
Pawan Magar Gharti	49 kg	~~80~~	80	~~90~~	80	7

=== Women ===
Athlete	Event	Attempt 1	Attempt 2	Attempt 3	Total	Rank
Rajani Rai	45 kg	40	44	~~46~~	44	8

== Swimming ==
=== Men ===
Athlete	Event	Heat		Final	
Athlete	Event	Result	Rank	Result	Rank
Harka Man Gharti	50 m freestyle S5	37.94	8Q	37.32	8
Harka Man Gharti	50 m butterfly S5	40.38	6Q	38.44	6

=== Women ===
Athlete	Event	Heat		Final	
Athlete	Event	Result	Rank	Result	Rank
Jenisha Kadayat	50 m freestyle S6	23 Oct			

== Table Tennis ==
Singles

Player	Event	Group stage					Quarter-final	Semi-final	Final	
Player	Event	Opposition Score	Opposition Score	Opposition Score	Opposition Score	Rank	Opposition Score	Opposition Score	Opposition Score	Rank
Keshav Thapa	Men's C3	Wadhwa (IND) L 0-3 _{(6-11, 4-11, 9-11)}	Alhassan (KSA) L 0-3 _{(5-11, 7-11, 6-11)}	Did not advance						
Digam Chemjong	Men's C4/C5	Astan (INA) L 0-3 _{(1-11, 6-11, 3-11)}	Yoy (CAM) L 1-3 _{(13-11, 3-11, 4-11, 5-11)}	Chaiwut (THA) L 0-3 _{(4-11, 2-11, 6-11)}	Did not advance					
Bibek Rai	Men's C7	Tong (HKG) L 0-3 _{(6-11, 5-11, 5-11)}	Orzabek (KAZ) L 1-3 _{(11-5, 5-11, 6-11, 9-11)}	Yagi (JPN) L 0-3 _{(1-11, 3-11, 2-11)}	Did not advance					
Swikrit Nepuane	Men's C7	Hwang (KOR) L 0-3 _{(5-11, 3-11, 6-11)}	Batnasan (MGL) W 3-0 _{(11-5, 11-5, 11-6)}	Yan (CHN) L 0-3 _{(8-11, 6-11, 3-11)}	Did not advance					
Nirmala Bhandari	Women's C4/5	Jung (KOR) L 0-3 _{(1-11, 4-11, 2-11)}	Sringam (THA) L 0-3 _{(1-11, 1-11, 2-11)}	Did not advance						
Sonika Dhakal	Women's C4/5	Moon (KOR) L 0-3 _{(2-11, 3-11, 8-11)}	Bibi (PAK) L 0-3 _{(7-11, 5-11, 3-11)}	Miyazaki (JPN) L 0-3 _{(5-11, 7-11, 1-11)}	Did not advance					
Lali Tamang	Women's C4/5	Zhang (CHN) L 0-3 _{(3-11, 1-6, 4-11)}	Sorn (CAM) L 0-3 _{(4-11, 6-11, 3-11)}	Marlina (INA) L 0-3 _{(4-11, 4-11, 4-11)}	Did not advance					

== Taekwondo ==
Athlete	Event	Quarterfinal	Semifinal / Repechage Round	Final / BM	Rank
Athlete	Event	Opposition Score	Opposition Score	Opposition Score	Rank
Renu Tamang	Women's K44-47kg	Phuangkitcha (THA) L 0-2	Baek (KOR) W 2-0	Yan (CHN) L 0-2	5
Palesha Goverdhan	Women's K44-57kg	Rahimi (IRI) L 0-2	Dosmalova (KAZ) W 2-0	Abdollahpour Deroei (IRI) L 0-2	5

== Wheelchair tennis ==
Summary

Athlete	Event	Group Stage			Quartefinals	Semifinals	Final / BM	
Athlete	Event	Opposition Score	Opposition Score	Rank	Opposition Score	Opposition Score	Opposition Score	Rank
Ram Tamang	Men's Singles - WT							
