= Bahrain at the 2026 Asian Para Games =

- Bahrain flag
- IPC code: BRN
- NPC: Bahrain Disabled Sports Federation-Bahrain Paralympic Committee
- Website: www.paralympic.org/npc/bahrain

in Aichi-Nagoya, Japan 18 October 2026 – 24 October 2026
- Competitors: 15 (10 men and 5 women) in 4 sports
- Flag bearers (opening): Zainab Ali Salman & Hussain Abdulaziz Mohammed
- Flag bearer (closing): TBD
- Medals Ranked 25th: Gold 0 Silver 1 Bronze 1 Total 2

Asian Para Games appearances (overview)
- 2010; 2014; 2018; 2022; 2026

Bahrain is participating in the 2026 Asian Para Games, to be held in Nagoya, Aichi Prefecture, Japan, from 18 to 24 October 2026. This will be Bahrain's fifth appearance at the Games.

== Medalists ==
Medal	Athlete	Sport	Event	Date

=== Summary ===
Medals by events
Sport	Gold	Silver	Bronze	Total
Athletics	0	1	1	2
Total	0	1	1	2

Medals by day
Day	Date	Gold	Silver	Bronze	Total
1	19 October	0	0	0	0
2	20 October	0	0	0	0
3	21 October	0	1	0	1
4	22 October	0	0	1	1
Total		0	1	1	2

Medals by gender
Gender	Gold	Silver	Bronze	Total
Female	0	1	1	2
Male	0	0	0	0
Mixed	0	0	0	0
Total	0	1	1	2

Multiple medalists
Athlete	Event	1st place, gold medalist(s)	2nd place, silver medalist(s)	3rd place, bronze medalist(s)	Total

== Competitors ==
Following is the list of sports and number of athletes that will participate in the upcoming edition:

Sport	Men	Women	Total
Athletics	7	3	10
Badminton	-	1	1
Boccia	2	-	2
Powerlifting	1	1	2
Total	10	4*	14

*A woman athlete, Ali Amal, is participating in two events namely, Athletics and Powerlifting.

== Athletics ==
Track events
Men

Athlete	Event	Class	Heat		Final	
Athlete	Event	Class	Result	Rank	Result	Rank
Mohamed Alshook	100 m	T51/T52	—N/a		22.93	5
Ahmed Nooh	100m	T53	17.26	9	Did not advance	
Alyas Ahmed	100 m	T71/T72	23 Oct			
Saad Saad	100 m	T71/T72	23 Oct			
Mohamed Alhaddar	100 m	T71/T72	23 Oct			
Mohamed Alshook	200 m	T51/T52	—N/a		23 Oct	
Ahmed Nooh	400 m	T53	22 Oct			

Field events
Men

Athlete	Event	Class	Qualification		Final	
Athlete	Event	Class	Result	Rank	Result	Rank
Saad Saad	Shot put	F32	—N/a		7.61	5
Saad Saad	Club throw	F32	—N/a		23 Oct	
Mohammed Almoalem	Club throw	F51	—N/a		23 Oct	
Mohammed Almoalem	Discus throw		—N/a		8.64	6

Women

Athlete	Event	Class	Qualification		Final	
Athlete	Event	Class	Result	Rank	Result	Rank
Maryam Alhamidi	Shot Put	F46	—N/a		23 Oct	
Rooba Al-Omari	Shot Put	F55/F56/F57	—N/a		7.45	3rd place, bronze medalist(s)
Amal Ali	Discus Throw	F54	—N/a		13.72	5
Rooba Al-Omari	Discus Throw	F55	—N/a		22.81	2nd place, silver medalist(s)
Maryam Alhamidi	Javelin Throw	F46	—N/a		DSQ	
Rooba Al-Omari	Javelin Throw	F55/F56	—N/a		17.96	6

== Badminton ==
Singles

Athlete	Event	Group stage				Round of 16	Quarterfinals	Semifinals	Final	
Athlete	Event	Opposition Score	Opposition Score	Opposition Score	Rank	Opposition Score	Opposition Score	Opposition Score	Opposition Score	Rank
Zainab Mohamed	Women's SU5	Murugesan (IND) L 0–2 (2-21, 2-21)	Li TT (CHN) L 0–2 (5-21, 3-21)	Wong L (HKG) L 0–2 _{(7-21, 4-21)}	Did not advance					

== Boccia ==
Athlete	Event	Group stage					Semifinals	Final	
Athlete	Event	Opposition Score	Opposition Score	Opposition Score	Opposition Score	Rank	Opposition Score	Opposition Score	Rank
Sayed Ali Alwedaei	Men's Individual BC2	Saengampa (THA) L 0–16	Seo (KOR) L 0–13	Did not advance					12
Isa Marjan	Men's Individual BC4	Kim (KOR) L 0–8	Leung (HKG) L 0–10	Esmaeilifazl (IRI) W 7–3	Kwanphok (THA) L 0–8	Did not advance			7

== Powerlifting ==
Men

Athlete	Event	Attempt 1	Attempt 2	Attempt 3	Total	Rank
Yusuf Aljlas	107 kg	200	210	212	212	5

Women

Athlete	Event	Attempt 1	Attempt 2	Attempt 3	Total	Rank
Amal Ali	45 kg	80	~~82~~	~~83~~	80	5
