= Lebanon at the 2026 Asian Para Games =

- Lebanese flag
- IPC code: LBN
- NPC: Lebanese Paralympic Committee
- Website: www.lebanonparalympics.org//

in Aichi-Nagoya, Japan 18 October 2026 – 24 October 2026
- Competitors: 2 (2 men and 0 women) in 2 sports
- Medals: Gold 0 Silver 0 Bronze 0 Total 0

Asian Para Games appearances
- 2010; 2014; 2018; 2022; 2026

Lebanon competed in the 2026 Asian Para Games, held in Nagoya, Aichi Prefecture, Japan, from 18 to 24 October 2026. This was Lebanon's fifth appearance at the Games. A total of 2 athletes competed across 2 disciplines.

== Medalists ==
Medal	Athlete	Sport	Event	Date

=== Summary ===
Medals by events
Sport	Gold	Silver	Bronze	Total
Total	0	0	0	0

Medals by day
Day	Date	Gold	Silver	Bronze	Total
1	19 October	0	0	0	0
2	20 October	0	0	0	0
3	21 October	0	0	0	0
4	22 October	0	0	0	0
5	23 October	0	0	0	0
6	24 October	0	0	0	0
Total		0	0	0	0

Medals by gender
Gender	Gold	Silver	Bronze	Total
Male	0	0	0	0
Female	0	0	0	0
Mixed	0	0	0	0
Total	0	0	0	0

Multiple medalists
Athlete	Event	1st place, gold medalist(s)	2nd place, silver medalist(s)	3rd place, bronze medalist(s)	Total

== Competitors ==
Following is the list of sports and number of athletes that participated in the edition:

Sport	Men	Women	Total
Athletics	1	-	1
Swimming	1	-	1
Total	2	-	2

== Athletics ==
Track events
Men

Athlete	Event	Class	Heat		Final	
Athlete	Event	Class	Result	Rank	Result	Rank
Arz Zahreddine	200 m	T64			25.98	6

== Swimming ==
Yassine Abdallah became first Lebanese para-swimmer to qualify for the Games.

Men

Athlete	Event	Heat		Final	
Athlete	Event	Result	Rank	Result	Rank
Yassin Abdallah	50 m freestyle S6	44.86	11	Did not advance	
Yassin Abdallah	100 m freestyle S6	1.34:51	11	Did not advance	
Yassin Abdallah	100 m breaststroke SB4	2:18.96	7Q	2:18.24	7
