= Kuwait at the 2026 Asian Para Games =

- Kuwaiti flag
- IPC code: KUW
- NPC: Kuwait Paralympic Committee
- Website: https://www.paralympic.org/npc/kuwait

in Aichi-Nagoya, Japan 18 October 2026 – 24 October 2026
- Competitors: 21 (18 men and 3 women) in 4 sports
- Medals Ranked 21st: Gold 1 Silver 0 Bronze 2 Total 3

Asian Para Games appearances
- 2010; 2014; 2018; 2022; 2026

Kuwait participated in the 2026 Asian Para Games, in Nagoya, Aichi Prefecture, Japan, held from 18 to 24 October 2026. This is Kuwait's fifth appearance at the Games.

== Medalists ==
Medal	Athlete	Sport	Event	Date
(gold) Gold	Faisal Sorour	Athletics	Men's Shot Put F42	22 October
(bronze) Bronze	Dhari N A Buti	Athletics	Men's Shot Put F37	19 October
(bronze) Bronze	Ali Malak	Athletics	Women's Shot Put F54	23 October

=== Summary ===
Medals by events
Sport	Gold	Silver	Bronze	Total
Athletics	1	0	2	3
Total	1	0	2	3

Medals by day
Day	Date	Gold	Silver	Bronze	Total
1	19 October	0	0	1	1
2	20 October	0	0	0	0
3	21 October	0	0	0	0
4	22 October	1	0	0	1
5	23 October	0	0	1	1
6	24 October	0	0	0	0
Total		1	0	2	3

Medals by gender
Gender	Gold	Silver	Bronze	Total
Female	0	0	1	1
Male	1	0	1	2
Mixed	0	0	0	0
Total	1	0	2	3

Multiple medalists
Athlete	Event	1st place, gold medalist(s)	2nd place, silver medalist(s)	3rd place, bronze medalist(s)	Total

== Competitors ==
Following is the list of sports and number of athletes that represented Kuwait:

Sport	Men	Women	Total
Athletics	4	1	5
Shooting	1	-	1
Table Tennis	2	2	4
Wheelchair Basketball	12	-	12
Total	18*	3	21

*One athlete, Faisal Alrajehi competed in two events, namely Athletics and Wheelchair Basketball.

== Athletics ==
Five athletes (four men and one woman) represented Kuwait in track and field events. Faisal Sorour, reigning Olympic gold medalist (Men’s Shot Put in F63 category) broke the Asian Para Games record previously held by Sutarno of Indonesia, and won Gold in his debut Asian Para Games.

In addition, Dhari N A Buti and Malak Ali secured bronze medals in Shot Put (Men's F37 and Women's F54, respectively). Further, Malak Ali came close to clinching her second bronze medal of the Games in Javelin Throw (F54 category) by recording her personal best, and finished fourth.

Track events
Men

Athlete	Event	Class	Heat		Final	
Athlete	Event	Class	Result	Rank	Result	Rank
Faisal Alrajehi	800 m	T54	-		DQ	
Faisal Alrajehi	1500 m	T54	-		3:01.43	7
Faisal Alrajehi	5000 m	T54	-		10:11.04 SB	6

Field events
Men

Athlete	Event	Class	Qualification		Final	
Athlete	Event	Class	Result	Rank	Result	Rank
Naser Faraj	Shot Put	F34	-		NM	
Dhari N A Buti	Shot Put	F37	-		12.53	3rd place, bronze medalist(s)
Faisal Sorour	Shot Put	F42	-		16.06 GR	1st place, gold medalist(s)

Women

Athlete	Event	Class	Qualification		Final	
Athlete	Event	Class	Result	Rank	Result	Rank
Malak Ali	Javelin Throw	F54	-		10.61 PB	4
Malak Ali	Shot Put	F54	-		4.98 SB	3rd place, bronze medalist(s)

== Shooting ==
Kuwait's lone shooter, Salman Almajdy competed in the Games.

Athlete	Event	Qualification		Final	
Athlete	Event	Result	Rank	Result	Rank
Salman Almajdy	P1 - Men's 10m Air Pistol SH1	555	16	Did not advance	

== Table Tennis ==
Four players (2 men and 2 women) competed in the Games.

Singles

Athlete	Event	Group Stage					Quarterfinal	Semifinal	Final / BM	
Athlete	Event	Opposition Result	Opposition Result	Opposition Result	Opposition Result	Rank	Opposition Result	Opposition Result	Opposition Result	Rank
Fajer Alkhalak	Women's Singles - Class 3	Yoon (KOR) L 0–3	Intanon (THA) L 0–3	Did not advance						-
Ahad Alrasheedi	Women's Singles - Class 4-5	Patel (IND) L 0–3	Eleimet (JOR) L 0–3	Did not advance						-
Mohammad Ben Jabal	Men's Singles - Class 3	Feng (CHN) L 0–3	Yeh (TPE) L 0–3	Did not advance						-
Ahmad Alotaibi	Men's Singles - Class 4-5	Kim (KOR) L 0–3	Chanphaka (THA) L 0–3	Did not advance						-

Doubles

Athlete	Event	Group Stage					Quarterfinal	Semifinal	Final / BM	
Athlete	Event	Opposition Result	Opposition Result	Opposition Result	Opposition Result	Rank	Opposition Result	Opposition Result	Opposition Result	Rank
Fajer Alkhalak Ahad Alrasheedi	Women's Doubles - Class WD10	Lee / Jung (KOR) L 0–3	Jaion / Sringam (THA) L 0–3	Zhang / Zhang (CHN) L 0–3	Marlina / Muslim (INA) L 0–3	Did not advance				5
Ahmad Alotaibi Mohammad Ben Jabal	Men's Doubles - Class MD8	Peng / Feng (CHN) L 0–3	Astan / Gunaya (INA) L 0–3	Did not advance						-
Fajer Alkhalak Ahmad Alotaibi	Mixed doubles - Class XD7	Gunaya / Muslim (INA) L 0–3	Bathuhan / Cartera (PHI) L 0–3	Patel / Wadhwa (IND) L 0–3	Did not advance					-
Ahad Alrasheedi Mohammad Ben Jabal	Mixed doubles - Class XD7	Glinbancheun / Jaion (THA) L 0–3	Bessho / Uno (JPN) L 1–3	Did not advance						-

== Wheelchair Basketball ==
Kuwait men's national wheelchair basketball team competed in the wheelchair basketball tournament. Kuwait shared group with host Japan, Thailand, and China.

Kuwait defeated Philippines in classification match (for the position of 7th and 8th).

Men's

Team	Event	Group Stage				Quartefinals	Semifinals	Classification (5th-8th)	Classification (Playoff 7/8)	Final / BM	
Team	Event	Opposition Score	Opposition Score	Opposition Score	Rank	Opposition Score	Opposition Score	Opposition Score	Opposition Score	Opposition Score	Rank
Kuwait men's	Men's tournament	Thailand L 44–72	China L 60–77	Japan L 33–70		Iran L 43–110	-	Iraq L 50–63	Philippines W 61–53	-	7
