= Qatar at the 2026 Asian Para Games =

- Qatari flag
- IPC code: QAT
- NPC: Qatar Paralympic Committee
- Website: www.olympic.qa/qatar-paralympic-committee/

in Aichi-Nagoya, Japan 18 October 2026 – 24 October 2026
- Competitors: 10 (9 men and 1 woman) in 3 sports
- Medals Ranked 24th: Gold 0 Silver 2 Bronze 2 Total 4

Asian Para Games appearances
- 2010; 2014; 2018; 2022; 2026

Qatar competed in the 2026 Asian Para Games, held in Nagoya, Aichi Prefecture, Japan, from 18 to 24 October 2026. This was Qatar's fifth appearance at the Games. A total of 10 athletes competed across 3 disciplines.

Qatar received Asian Para Games Flag for hosting 6th Asian Games scheduled in Doha in 2030.

== Medalists ==
Medal	Athlete	Sport	Event	Date
(silver) Silver	Arshad Ali	Athletics	Men's 100 m T33/T34	20 October
(silver) Silver	Shamil Shahov	Swimming	Men's 100 m breakstroke SB13	20 October
(bronze) Bronze	Abdulrahman Fiqi	Athletics	Men's Shot Put F34	23 October
(bronze) Bronze	Shamil Shahov	Swimming	Men's 400 m freestyle S13	20 October

=== Summary ===
Medals by events
Sport	Gold	Silver	Bronze	Total
Athletics	0	1	1	2
Swimming	0	1	1	2
Total	0	2	2	4

Medals by day
Day	Date	Gold	Silver	Bronze	Total
1	19 October	0	0	0	0
2	20 October	0	2	1	3
3	21 October	0	0	0	0
4	22 October	0	0	0	0
5	23 October	0	0	1	1
6	24 October	0	0	0	0
Total		0	2	2	4

Medals by gender
Gender	Gold	Silver	Bronze	Total
Male	0	2	2	4
Female	0	0	0	0
Mixed	0	0	0	0
Total	0	2	2	4

Multiple medalists
Athlete	Event	1st place, gold medalist(s)	2nd place, silver medalist(s)	3rd place, bronze medalist(s)	Total
Shamil Shahov	Swimming	0	1	1	2

== Competitors ==
Following is the list of sports and number of athletes that participated in the edition:

Sport	Men	Women	Total
Athletics	3	1	4
Goalball	4	-	4
Swimming	2	-	2
Total	9	1	10

== Athletics ==
Track events
Men

Athlete	Event	Class	Heat		Final	
Athlete	Event	Class	Result	Rank	Result	Rank
Arshad Ali	100 m	T35	-		14.95	2nd place, silver medalist(s)
Mohammed Al-Kubaisi	100 m	T33/T34	-		16.80	7
Arshad Ali	800 m	T33/T34	-		1:43.19	4

Field events
Men

Athlete	Event	Class	Final	
Athlete	Event	Class	Result	Rank
Abdulrahman Fiqi	Shot put	F34	10.49 SB	3rd place, bronze medalist(s)

== Goalball ==
Event	Group stage						Round of 16	Quarterfinals	Semifinals	Final	
Event	Opposition Score	Opposition Score	Opposition Score	Opposition Score	Opposition Score	Rank	Opposition Score	Opposition Score	Opposition Score	Opposition Score	Rank
Men's Goalball	Japan L 2–12	IranL 0–10	ThailandL 3–12	South KoreaL 2–11	ChinaL 0–10	6	Did not advance				

== Swimming ==
Athlete	Event	Heat		Final	
Athlete	Event	Result	Rank	Result	Rank
Khalifa Al-Mutlaq	50 m freestyle S11	42.94	10	Did not advance	
Khalifa Al-Mutlaq	100 m freestyle S11	-		1.41:55	6
Khalifa Al-Mutlaq	100 m breaststroke SB11	4:46.10	5	Did not advance	
Shamil Shahov	50 m freestyle S13	DNS		Did not advance	
Shamil Shahov	100 m backstroke S12	-		DSQ	
Shamil Shahov	100 m butterfly S12	-		1:04.28	4
Shamil Shahov	100 m breaststroke SB13	1:14.00	1Q	1:13.17	2nd place, silver medalist(s)
Shamil Shahov	100 m freestyle S12	-		58.81	4
Shamil Shahov	200 m individual medley SM13	-		2:24.87	4
Shamil Shahov	400 m freestyle S13	-		4:33.09	3rd place, bronze medalist(s)
