= Timor-Leste at the 2026 Asian Para Games =

- IPC code: TLS
- NPC: National Paralympic Committee of the Democratic Republic of Timor-Leste

in Aichi-Nagoya, Japan 18 October 2026 – 24 October 2026
- Competitors: 4 (3 men and 1 woman) in 2 sports
- Flag bearer (closing): TBD
- Medals: Gold 0 Silver 1 Bronze 0 Total 1

Asian Para Games appearances
- 2010; 2014; 2018; 2022; 2026

Timor-Leste competed at the 2026 Asian Para Games in Nagoya, Aichi Prefecture, Japan, from 18 to 24 October 2026. This was Timor-Leste's fifth appearance at the Games.

== Medalists ==
Medal	Athlete	Sport	Event	Date
2nd place, silver medalist(s)	Teofilo Freitas	Athletics	Men's T37/T38	23 Oct

=== Summary ===
Medals by events
Sport	Gold	Silver	Bronze	Total
Athletics	0	1	0	1
Total	0	1	0	1

Medals by day
Day	Date	Gold	Silver	Bronze	Total
5	23 October	0	1	0	1
Total		0	1	0	1

Medals by gender
Gender	Gold	Silver	Bronze	Total
Male	0	1	0	1
Total	0	1	0	1

== Competitors ==
The following list of sports and number of athletes participated in the edition:

Sport	Men	Women	Total
Athletics	3	-	3
Table tennis	-	1	1
Total	3	1	4

== Athletics ==
Track events
Men

Athlete	Event	Class	Heat		Final	
Athlete	Event	Class	Result	Rank	Result	Rank
Joaozinho Araujo	400 m	T13	1:07.87	8 q	DNS	
Teofilo Freitas	400 m	T35 / T38	—N/a		54.71	5
Romerio de Jesus	1500 m	T12/T13	—N/a		5:25.86	7
Joaozinho Araujo	1500 m	T12/T13	—N/a		5:22.21	6
Teofilo Freitas	1500 m	T38	—N/a		4:25.39	2nd place, silver medalist(s)
Romerio de Jesus	5000 m	T12/T13	—N/a		20:03.12	7
Joaozinho Araujo	5000 m	T12/T13	—N/a		18:51.39	6

== Table Tennis ==
Singles

Player	Event	Group stage				Round of 16	Quarterfinals	Semifinals	Final	
Player	Event	Opposition Score	Opposition Score	Opposition Score	Rank	Opposition Score	Opposition Score	Opposition Score	Opposition Score	Rank
Abelita Soares	Women's C7	Kim S-o (KOR); L WO	Peña (PHI); L 0–3 (2–11, 4–11, 6–11)	Wang R. (CHN); L 0–3 (1–11, 3–11, 5–11)	4	Did not advance				
