= Maldives at the 2026 Asian Para Games =

- Maldives flag
- IPC code: MDV

in Aichi-Nagoya, Japan 18 October 2026 – 24 October 2026
- Competitors: 3 (2 men and 1 woman) in 1 sport
- Flag bearer (closing): TBD
- Medals: Gold 0 Silver 0 Bronze 0 Total 0

Asian Para Games appearances
- 2022; 2026

Maldives is participating in the 2026 Asian Para Games, in Nagoya, Aichi Prefecture, Japan, from 18 to 24 October 2026. This is Maldives second appearance at the Games.

== Competitors ==
Following is the list of sports and number of athletes that will participate in the upcoming edition:

Sport	Men	Women	Total
Athletics	2	1	3
Total	2	1	3

== Athletics ==
Track events
Men

Athlete	Event	Class	Heat		Final	
Athlete	Event	Class	Result	Rank	Result	Rank
Abdul Abdul	100 m	T12	14.70	4	Did not advance	
Abdulla Asgar	100 m	T47	12.87	16	Did not advance	
Abdulla Asgar	400 m	T47	1:04.40	6	Did not advance	

Women

Athlete	Event	Class	Heat		Final	
Athlete	Event	Class	Result	Rank	Result	Rank
Fathimath Ibrahim	100 m	T11	16.31	4	Did not advance	
Fathimath Ibrahim	200 m	T11	36.70	10	Did not advance	

Field events
Men

Athlete	Event	Class	Qualification		Final	
Athlete	Event	Class	Result	Rank	Result	Rank
Abdulla Asgar	Long jump	T47	4.94	10	Did not advance	
