= Pakistan at the 2026 Asian Para Games =

- IPC code: PAK
- NPC: National Paralympic Committee of Pakistan

in Aichi-Nagoya, Japan 18 October 2026 – 24 October 2026
- Competitors: 9 (7 men and 2 women) in 4 sports
- Medals Ranked 27th: Gold 0 Silver 1 Bronze 0 Total 1

Asian Para Games appearances (overview)
- 2010; 2014; 2018; 2022; 2026

Pakistan competed at the 2026 Asian Para Games, held in Nagoya, Aichi Prefecture, Japan, from 18 to 24 October 2026.

Pakistan sent a 16-member contingent to the Nagoya 2026 Asian Para Games. Led by Tokyo 2020 Paralympic gold medalist Haider Ali, the team competed across four disciplines, athletics, powerlifting, table tennis, and wheelchair tennis. Haider Ali won a silver medal in the men's discus throw F37 with a best throw of 57.20 meters.

== Medal summary ==
Medals by sport
Sport	Gold	Silver	Bronze	Total
Athletics	0	1	0	1
Total	0	1	0	1

Medals by gender
Gender	Gold	Silver	Bronze	Total
Female	0	0	0	0
Male	0	1	0	1
Mixed	0	0	0	0
Total	0	1	0	1

Medals by day
Day	Date	Gold	Silver	Bronze	Total
1	18 October	0	0	0	0
2	19 October	0	0	0	0
3	20 October	0	0	0	0
4	21 October	0	1	0	1
5	22 October	0	0	0	0
6	23 October	0	0	0	0
7	24 October	0	0	0	0
Total		0	1	0	1

Medalists

Medal	Athlete	Sport	Event	Date
Silver	Haider Ali	Athletics	Men's Discus Throw F37	21 October

== Athletics ==
Track events

Athlete	Event	Class	Heat		Final	
Athlete	Event	Class	Result	Rank	Result	Rank
Khadija Imran	Women's 100 m	T47	13.46	4 q	13.62	8
Khadija Imran	Women's 200 m	T47	28.37	5	Did not Advance	

Field events

Athlete	Event	Class	Final	
Athlete	Event	Class	Result	Rank
Haider Ali	Men's Discus Throw	F37	57.20	2nd place, silver medalist(s)
Nabeel Iqbal	Men's Shot Put	F42/61/63	9.86	5
Muhammad Nadeem	Men's High Jump	T63	1.55	6

== Powerlifting ==
Athlete	Event	Attempt 1	Attempt 2	Attempt 3	Rank
Nasir Butt	Men's 80 kg	120	125	135	10

== Table Tennis ==
Singles

Player	Event	Group stage				Quarter-finals	Semi-finals	Final	
Player	Event	Opposition Score	Opposition Score	Opposition Score	Rank	Opposition Score	Opposition Score	Opposition Score	Rank
Abdullah Jan	Men's C8	Zhao (CHN); L 0–3	Murodullaev (UZB); L 0–3	—N/a	3	Did not advance			
Muhammad Zain Ali	Men's C9	Wong (HKG); L 0–3	Erekeyev (KAZ); L 0–3	—N/a	3	Did not advance			
Tajmeena Bibi	Women's C4/5	Miyazaki (JPN); L 0–3	Dhakal (NEP); W 3–0	Moon (KOR); L 0–3	3	Did not advance			

Doubles

Pair	Event	Group stage			Quarter-final	Semi-final	Final	
Pair	Event	Opposition Score	Opposition Score	Rank	Opposition Score	Opposition Score	Opposition Score	Rank
Abdullah Jan; Muhammad Zain Ali	Men's MD18	Abe / Iwabuchi (JPN); L 0–3	Chen / Zhao (CHN); L 0–3	3	Did not advance			

== Tennis ==
Player	Event	1st Round	2nd Round	Quarter-finals	Semi-finals	Final
Player	Event	Opposition Score	Opposition Score	Opposition Score	Opposition Score	Opposition Score
Asif Abbasi	Men's singles	Habal (IRQ); L 0–6, 1–6	Did not advance			
