= Badminton at the 2026 Asian Para Games =

Badminton championships

- Venue: Ichinomiya City Municipal Gymnasium
- Location: Ichinomiya, Japan
- Dates: 16–23 October 2026
- Competitors: 153 from 22 nations

Badminton tournament at the 2026 Asian Para Games was held at Ichimoniya City Municipal Gymnasium, Ichinomiya, Japan from 16 to 23 October 2026. The badminton programme in 2026 included men's and women's singles competitions; men's, women's and mixed doubles competitions.

== Classification ==
The players were classified to six different classes as per the Badminton World Federation.

== Nations ==
1. Bangladesh (2)
2. Bhutan (1)
3. Bahrain (1)
4. Brunei (1)
5. China (25)
6. Hong Kong (7)
7. India (28)
8. Indonesia (15)
9. Iraq (2)
10. Japan (12)
11. South Korea (15)
12. Malaysia (8)
13. Nepal (1)
14. Philippines (3)
15. Saudi Arabia (2)
16. Singapore (1)
17. Sri Lanka (1)
18. Chinese Taipei (10)
19. Tajikistan (1)
20. Thailand (12)
21. United Arab Emirates (4)
22. Vietnam (1)

== Medal table ==
* Host nation (Japan)

Rank	Nation	Gold	Silver	Bronze	Total
1	China (CHN)	12	6	14	32
2	India (IND)	3	5	8	16
3	Indonesia (INA)	3	3	6	12
4	Japan (JPN)*	3	0	3	6
5	Malaysia (MAS)	1	0	2	3
6	South Korea (KOR)	0	5	3	8
7	Thailand (THA)	0	2	2	4
8	Chinese Taipei (TPE)	0	1	1	2
9	Hong Kong (HKG)	0	0	1	1
Totals (9 entries)		22	22	40	84

== Medalists ==
=== Men ===
Event	Class	Gold	Silver	Bronze
Singles	WH1	Qu Zimo; China	Park Hae-seong; South Korea	Choi Jung-man; South Korea
Singles	WH1	Qu Zimo; China	Park Hae-seong; South Korea	Jin Gi-beom; South Korea
Singles	WH2	Daiki Kajiwara; Japan	Yu Soo-young; South Korea	Wu Xincheng; China
Singles	WH2	Daiki Kajiwara; Japan	Yu Soo-young; South Korea	Mai Jianpeng; China
Singles	SL3	Kumar Nitesh; India	Pramod Bhagat; India	Muhammad Al Imran; Indonesia
Singles	SL3	Kumar Nitesh; India	Pramod Bhagat; India	Lee Seung-hu; South Korea
Singles	SL4	Naveen Sivakumar; India	Fredy Setiawan; Indonesia	Abhijeet Sakhuja; India
Singles	SL4	Naveen Sivakumar; India	Fredy Setiawan; Indonesia	Suhas Lalinakere Yathiraj; India
Singles	SU5	Li Mingpan; China	Fang Jen-yu; Chinese Taipei	Cheah Liek Hou; Malaysia
Singles	SU5	Li Mingpan; China	Fang Jen-yu; Chinese Taipei	Taiyo Imai; Japan
Singles	SH6	Lin Naili; China	Natthapong Meechai; Thailand	Zeng Qingtao; China
Singles	SH6	Lin Naili; China	Natthapong Meechai; Thailand	Chu Man Kai; Hong Kong
Doubles	WH1–WH2	China (CHN); Qu Zimo; Mai Jianpeng	South Korea (KOR); Park Hae-seong; Yu Soo-young	Japan (JPN); Daiki Kajiwara; Keita Nishimura
Doubles	WH1–WH2	China (CHN); Qu Zimo; Mai Jianpeng	South Korea (KOR); Park Hae-seong; Yu Soo-young	Malaysia (MAS); Noor Azwan Noorlan; Muhammad Ikhwan Ramli
Doubles	SL3–SU5	Indonesia (INA); Muhammad Al Imran; Suryo Nugroho	South Korea (KOR); Cho Na-dan; Shin Kyung-hwan	China (CHN); Li Mingpan; Xiong Lichuan
Doubles	SL3–SU5	Indonesia (INA); Muhammad Al Imran; Suryo Nugroho	South Korea (KOR); Cho Na-dan; Shin Kyung-hwan	India (IND); Naveen Sivakumar; Surya Kant Yadav
Doubles	SU5	Malaysia (MAS); Cheah Liek Hou; Faris Azri	Thailand (THA); Pricha Somsiri; Nattaphon Thaweesap	Chinese Taipei (TPE); Fang Jen-yu; Pu Gui-yu
Doubles	SH6	China (CHN); Lin Naili; Zeng Qingtao	India (IND); Krishna Nagar; Sivarajan Solaimalai	Indonesia (INA); Dimas Tri Aji; Subhan

=== Women ===
Event	Class	Gold	Silver	Bronze
Singles	WH1	Sarina Satomi; Japan	Yin Menglu; China	Yang Fan; China
Singles	WH1	Sarina Satomi; Japan	Yin Menglu; China	Sena Tomoyose; Japan
Singles	WH2	Liu Yutong; China	Xu Tingting; China	Amnouy Wetwithan; Thailand
Singles	WH2	Liu Yutong; China	Xu Tingting; China	Li Hongyan; China
Singles	SL3	Shino Kawai; Japan	Xiao Zuxian; China	Sanjana Kumari; India
Singles	SL3	Shino Kawai; Japan	Xiao Zuxian; China	Qonitah Ikhtiar Syakuroh; Indonesia
Singles	SL4	Cheng Hefang; China	Leani Ratri Oktila; Indonesia	Khalimatus Sadiyah; Indonesia
Singles	SL4	Cheng Hefang; China	Leani Ratri Oktila; Indonesia	Huang Zixuan; China
Singles	SU5	Yang Qiuxia; China	Thulasimathi Murugesan; India	Li Tongtong; China
Singles	SU5	Yang Qiuxia; China	Thulasimathi Murugesan; India	Manisha Ramadass; India
Singles	SH6	Li Fengmei; China	Nithya Sre Sivan; India	Lin Shuangbao; China
Singles	SH6	Li Fengmei; China	Nithya Sre Sivan; India	Rina Marlina; Indonesia
Doubles	WH1–WH2	China (CHN); Liu Yutong; Yin Menglu	China (CHN); Xu Tingting; Yang Fan	India (IND); Alphia James; Pallavi Kaluvehalli
Doubles	WH1–WH2	China (CHN); Liu Yutong; Yin Menglu	China (CHN); Xu Tingting; Yang Fan	Thailand (THA); Onanong Phraikaeo; Amnouy Wetwithan
Doubles	SL3–SU5	India (IND); Manasi Joshi; Thulasimathi Murugesan	China (CHN); Xiao Zuxian; Yang Qiuxia	China (CHN); Cheng Hefang; Huang Zixuan
Doubles	SL3–SU5	India (IND); Manasi Joshi; Thulasimathi Murugesan	China (CHN); Xiao Zuxian; Yang Qiuxia	Indonesia (INA); Leani Ratri Oktila; Khalimatus Sadiyah
Doubles	SH6	China (CHN); Li Fengmei; Lin Shuangbao	Indonesia (INA); Rina Marlina; Apriliyana Sulistyawati	Not awarded

=== Mixed ===
Event	Class	Gold	Silver	Bronze
Doubles	WH1–WH2	China (CHN); Qu Zimo; Liu Yutong	South Korea (KOR); Park Hae-seong; Jung Gyeoul	China (CHN); Wu Xincheng; Yang Fan
Doubles	WH1–WH2	China (CHN); Qu Zimo; Liu Yutong	South Korea (KOR); Park Hae-seong; Jung Gyeoul	China (CHN); Mai Jianpeng; Yin Menglu
Doubles	SL3–SU5	Indonesia (INA); Hikmat Ramdani; Leani Ratri Oktila	India (IND); Kumar Nitesh; Thulasimathi Murugesan	India (IND); Pramod Bhagat; Manisha Ramdass
Doubles	SL3–SU5	Indonesia (INA); Hikmat Ramdani; Leani Ratri Oktila	India (IND); Kumar Nitesh; Thulasimathi Murugesan	China (CHN); Li Mingpan; Xiao Zuxian
Doubles	SH6	Indonesia (INA); Subhan; Rina Marlina	China (CHN); Zeng Qingtao; Lin Shuangbao	China (CHN); Lin Naili; Li Fengmei
Doubles	SH6	Indonesia (INA); Subhan; Rina Marlina	China (CHN); Zeng Qingtao; Lin Shuangbao	India (IND); Krishna Nagar; Nithya Sre Sivan
