= Nepal at the 2010 Asian Para Games =

- IOC code: NEP
- NPC: National Paralympic Committee Nepal

in Guangzhou 12–19 December 2010
- Competitors: 7 in 4 sports
- Medals: Gold 0 Silver 0 Bronze 0 Total 0

Asian Para Games appearances
- 2010; 2014; 2018; 2022; 2026

Youth appearances
- 2009

Nepal participated tn the 2010 Asian Para Games–First Asian Para Games in Guangzhou, China from 13 to 19 December 2010. Athletes from Nepal competed four events.
