= Oman at the 2026 Asian Para Games =

- Flag of Oman
- IPC code: OMA
- NPC: Oman Paralympic Committee
- Website: ooc.om

in Aichi-Nagoya, Japan 18 October 2026 – 24 October 2026
- Competitors: 13 (11 men and 2 women) in 2 sports
- Medals Ranked 31st: Gold 0 Silver 0 Bronze 1 Total 1

Asian Para Games appearances (overview)
- 2010; 2014; 2018; 2022; 2026

Oman competed in the 2026 Asian Para Games, held in Nagoya, Aichi Prefecture, Japan, from 18 to 24 October 2026. This was Oman's fifth appearance at the Games. A total of 13 athletes (11 men and 2 women) competed across 2 disciplines.

Athlete Rawan Hashim Al Hasni won sole medal (one bronze) for Oman in Women's 100m.

== Medalists ==
Medal	Athlete	Sport	Event	Date
(bronze) Bronze	Rawan Hashim Al Hasni	Athletics	Women's 100m T51/T52/T53	21 October

=== Summary ===
Medals by events
Sport	Gold	Silver	Bronze	Total
Athletics	0	0	1	1
Total	0	0	1	1

Medals by day
Day	Date	Gold	Silver	Bronze	Total
1	19 October	0	0	0	0
2	20 October	0	0	0	0
3	21 October	0	0	1	1
4	22 October	0	0	0	0
5	23 October	0	0	0	0
6	24 October	0	0	0	0
Total		0	0	1	1

Medals by gender
Gender	Gold	Silver	Bronze	Total
Male	0	0	0	0
Female	0	0	1	1
Mixed	0	0	0	0
Total	0	0	1	1

== Competitors ==
Following is the list of sports and number of athletes that represented Oman in this edition:

Sport	Men	Women	Total
Athletics	10	2	12
Cycling	1	-	1
Total	11	2	13

== Athletics ==
Oman sent a contingent of 12 athletes (10 men and 2 women). Rawan Hashim Al Hasni secured a bronze medal in Women's 100m event. In addition, many athletes recorded their various personal and season bests.

Men
Track events

Athlete	Event	Class	Heat		Final	
Athlete	Event	Class	Result	Rank	Result	Rank
Othman Al Habsi	100 m	T12	12.32	7	Did not advance	
Qusai Al Rawahi	100 m	T13	11.82	9	Did not advance	
Taha Abdullah Al Harrasi	100 m	T36	12.80	8 q	12.98	8
Saif Hamood Al Muqaibli	100 m	T47	11.59	10	Did not advance	
Othman Al Habsi	400m	T12	57.22	6	Did not advance	
Saif Hamood Al Muqaibli	400m	T47	DNF		Did not advance	

Field events

Athlete	Event	Class	Heat		Final	
Athlete	Event	Class	Result	Rank	Result	Rank
Fawzi Al Hubaishi	Discus Throw	F54	Cancelled			
Talib Al Balushi	Discus Throw	F56	-		27.03	9
Motasim Al Saadi	Javelin Throw	F33	-		13.17	7
Muhanna Awlad	Javelin Throw	F33	-		DNS	
Fawzi Al Hubaishi	Javelin Throw	F54	-		18.56	6
Talib Al Balushi	Javelin Throw	F56	-		DNS	
Mohammed Al Mashaykhi	Shot Put	F32	-		7.20 SB	6
Mohammed Al Qasmi	Shot Put	F32	-		7.78 SB	4
Muhanna Awlad	Shot Put	F33	-		7.74 SB	5
Motasim Al Saadi	Shot Put	F53	-		6.04 PB	4
Fawzi Al Hubaishi	Shot Put	F54	-		5.22	10
Talib Al Balushi	Shot Put	F56	-		6.53	6
Othman Al Habsi	Long Jump	T12	-		5.48	4
Qusai Al Rawahi	Long Jump	T13	-		5.36 SB	7
Taha Abdullah Al Harrasi	Long Jump	T36	-		5.25	5
Mohammed Al Mashaykhi	Club Throw	F32	-		DNS	
Mohammed Al Qasmi	Club Throw	F32	-		23.54	6

Women
Track events

Athlete	Event	Class	Heat		Final	
Athlete	Event	Class	Result	Rank	Result	Rank
Rawan Hashim Al Hasni	100m	T53	-		22.49	3rd place, bronze medalist(s)

Field events

Athlete	Event	Class	Heat		Final	
Athlete	Event	Class	Result	Rank	Result	Rank
Rawan Hashim Al Hasni	Javelin Throw	F54	-		10.17 SB	5
Taiseer Iman	Javelin Throw	F34	-		14.10 PB	6
Taiseer Iman	Shot Put	F34	-		5.62	6

== Cycling ==
Oman's lone cycler Alsulaim Sami took part in Cycling event at this edition of the Games. He finished fourth in Men's H4-5 Road Race.

Athlete	Event	Heat		Final	
Athlete	Event	Result	Rank	Result	Rank
Alsulaim Sami	Men's H4-5 Road Race	-		-3LAP	4
Alsulaim Sami	Men's H1-5 Time Trial	-		34:57.76	9
