= Ryota Fukunaga =

Japanese Paralympic athlete (born 1998)

Personal information
- Nationality: Japanese
- Born: 28 September 1998 (age 28) Yasu, Shiga, Japan

Sport
- Sport: Para-athletics
- Disability class: T13
- Event: Sprints
Medal record
Men's para-athletics
Representing Japan
Paralympic Games
Silver medal – second place	2024 Paris	400 m T13
World Championships
Gold medal – first place	2023 Paris	400 m T13
Silver medal – second place	2023 Paris	Long jump T13
Silver medal – second place	2024 Kobe	400 m T13
Silver medal – second place	2025 New Delhi	Long jump T13
Silver medal – second place	2025 New Delhi	400 m T13
Asian Para Games
Gold medal – first place	2026 Aichi–Nagoya	Long jump T13
Silver medal – second place	2026 Aichi–Nagoya	100 m T13

Ryota Fukunaga (born 28 September 1998) is a Japanese T13 Paralympic sprint runner. He represented Japan at the 2024 Summer Paralympics.

== Career ==
In 2023, he won the silver medal in the men's long jump T13 event at the World Para Athletics Championships held in Paris, France. He also won the gold medal in the men's 400 metres T13 event.

In May 2024, Fukunaga represented Japan at the 2024 World Para Athletics Championships and won a silver medal in the 400 metres T13 event. He then represented Japan at the 2024 Summer Paralympics and won a silver medal in the 400 metres T13 event.
