= Malaysia at the 2026 Asian Para Games =

- IPC code: MAS
- NPC: Paralympic Council Malaysia

in Aichi and Nagoya, Japan 18–24 October 2026
- Competitors: 63 (46 men and 17 women) in 10 sports
- Flag bearer (opening): Muhammad Nazmi Nasri
- Flag bearer (closing): Wong Kar Gee
- Medals Ranked 12th: Gold 6 Silver 8 Bronze 13 Total 27

Asian Para Games appearances (overview)
- 2010; 2014; 2018; 2022; 2026

Malaysia participated in the 2026 Asian Para Games held in Nagoya, Aichi Prefecture, Japan, from 18 to 24 October 2026.

== Competitors ==
The following is a list of the number of competitors representing Malaysia that will participate at the Asian Para Games:

Sport	Men	Women	Total
Archery	2	2	4
Athletics	21	3	24
Badminton	6	2	8
Boccia	2	3	5
Cycling	4	2	6
Powerlifting	2	0	2
Shooting	0	1	1
Swimming	4	3	7
Table tennis	3	1	4
Wheelchair tennis	2	0	2
Total	46	17	63

== Medal summary ==
=== Medal by sport ===
Medals by sport
Sport	1st place, gold medalist(s)	2nd place, silver medalist(s)	3rd place, bronze medalist(s)	Total
Athletics	2	4	3	9
Badminton	1	0	2	3
Boccia	0	1	1	2
Cycling	1	2	2	5
Powerlifting	1	0	0	1
Swimming	1	1	3	5
Table tennis	0	0	2	2
Total	6	8	13	27

=== Medal by date ===
Medals by date
Day	Date	1st place, gold medalist(s)	2nd place, silver medalist(s)	3rd place, bronze medalist(s)	Total
1	19 October	1	0	1	2
2	20 October	2	3	2	6
3	21 October	2	1	5	8
4	22 October	1	2	2	5
5	23 October	0	2	3	5
6	24 October	0	0	0	0
Total		6	8	13	27

=== Medallists ===
Medal	Name	Sport	Event	Date
Gold	Zuhairie Ahmad Tarmizi	Cycling	Men's C4 1000m time trial	19 October
Gold	Bonnie Bunyau Gustin	Powerlifting	Men's 72kg	20 October
Gold	Abdul Latif Romly	Athletics	Men's long jump T20	20 October
Gold	Cheah Liek Hou; Mohamad Faris Ahmad Azri	Badminton	Men's doubles SU5	21 October
Gold	Muhammad Nur Syaiful Zulkafli	Swimming	Men's 100m breaststroke SB4	21 October
Gold	Wong Kar Gee	Athletics	Men's long jump T12	22 October
Silver	Muhammad Ammar Aiman Nor Azmi	Athletics	Men's 400m T20	20 October
Silver	Mohamad Yusof Hafizi Shaharuddin	Cycling	Men's C1-3 1000m time trial	20 October
Silver	Mohd Khairul Hazwan Wahab	Cycling	Men's B 1000m time trial	20 October
Silver	Angeline Melissa Lawas	Boccia	Women's Individual BC1	21 October
Silver	Eddy Bernard	Athletics	Men's long jump T44/T62/T64	22 October
Silver	Abd Halim Mohammad	Swimming	Men's 100m breaststroke SB8	22 October
Silver	Muhammad Ziyad Zolkefli	Athletics	Men's shot put F20	23 October
Silver	Siti Noraidah Suherman	Athletics	Women's shot put F20	23 October
Bronze	Mohamad Yusof Hafizi Shaharuddin	Cycling	Men's C1-3 3000m time trial	19 October
Bronze	Nur Suraiya Muhamad Zamri	Cycling	Women's B 1000m time trial	20 October
Bronze	Jennahtul Fahmi Ahmad Jennah	Table tennis	Men's singles Class 11	20 October
Bronze	Muhammad Noorhelmie Mohd Rabi	Athletics	Men's 100m T12	21 October
Bronze	Ahmad Fizzi Rosni	Athletics	Men's 400m T36	21 October
Bronze	Noor Askuzaimey Mat Salim	Boccia	Women's individual BC4	21 October
Bronze	Noor Azwan Noorlan; Muhammad Ikhwan Ramli	Badminton	Men's doubles WH1–WH2	21 October
Bronze	Lim Carmen	Swimming	Women's 50m freestyle S8	21 October
Bronze	Cheah Liek Hou	Badminton	Men's singles SU5	22 October
Bronze	Shahafiq Abdullah	Swimming	Men's 100m breaststroke SB7	22 October
Bronze	Mohamad Aliff Mohamad Awi	Athletics	Men's shot put F20	23 October
Bronze	Muhammad Nur Syaiful Zulkafli	Swimming	Men's 100m freestyle S5	23 October
Bronze	Mohd Hazlin Abdullah; Jennahtul Fahmi Ahmad Jennah	Table tennis	Men's doubles Class MD22	23 October
