= Mongolia at the 2026 Asian Para Games =

Mongolia's participation in the 2026 Asian Para Games

- Mongolian flag
- IPC code: MGL
- NPC: Mongolian Paralympic Committee
- Website: www.paralympic.mn/mnpc/about

in Aichi-Nagoya, Japan 18 October 2026 – 24 October 2026
- Competitors: 45 (22 men and 23 women) in 10 sports
- Medals Ranked 14th: Gold 4 Silver 4 Bronze 2 Total 10

Asian Para Games appearances
- 2010; 2014; 2018; 2022; 2026

Mongolia competed in the 2026 Asian Para Games, held in Nagoya, Aichi Prefecture, Japan, from 18 to 24 October 2026. This was Mongolia's fifth appearance at the Games. A total of 45 athletes competed across 10 disciplines.

This marks the country's best historical performance at the Asian Para Games.

Archer Selengee Demberel won two medals (one silver and one bronze) in Recurve Archery.

== Medalists ==
| Medal | Athlete | Sport | Event | Date |
|---|---|---|---|---|
| (gold) Gold | Ulambayar Surenjav | Taekwondo | Women K44 -52kg | 19 October |
| (gold) Gold | Ganbatyn Bolor-Erdene | Taekwondo | Men K44 -63kg | 20 October |
| (gold) Gold | Turuunnaa Lkhaijav | Judo | Women's J1 -70 kg | 20 October |
| (gold) Gold | Enkhbayar Sodnompiljee | Powerlifting | Men's -107 kg | 22 October |
| (silver) Silver | Suvd-Erdene Togtokhbayar | Judo | Women's J1 -52 kg | 19 October |
| (silver) Silver | Gan-Erdene Gansukh | Athletics | Men's Shot Put F40 | 21 October |
| (silver) Silver | Dorjzodov Tsedensodnom | Athletics | Men's Discus Throw F54/55/56 | 23 October |
| (silver) Silver | Selengee Demberel | Archery | Women's Recurve | 24 October |
| (bronze) Bronze | Tyemirbyek Khaulyet | Taekwondo | Men K44 -58kg | 19 October |
| (bronze) Bronze | Selengee Demberel Oyun-Erdene Buyanjargal | Archery | Women's Doubles Recurve | 23 October |

=== Summary ===
Medals by events
| Sport | Gold | Silver | Bronze | Total |
|---|---|---|---|---|
| Taekwondo | 2 | 0 | 1 | 3 |
| Judo | 1 | 1 | 0 | 2 |
| Powerlifting | 1 | 0 | 0 | 1 |
| Athletics | 0 | 2 | 0 | 2 |
| Archery | 0 | 1 | 1 | 2 |
| Total | 4 | 4 | 2 | 10 |

Medals by day
| Day | Date | Gold | Silver | Bronze | Total |
|---|---|---|---|---|---|
| 1 | 19 October | 1 | 1 | 1 | 3 |
| 2 | 20 October | 2 | 0 | 0 | 2 |
| 3 | 21 October | 0 | 1 | 0 | 1 |
| 4 | 22 October | 1 | 0 | 0 | 1 |
| 5 | 23 October | 0 | 1 | 1 | 2 |
| 6 | 24 October | 0 | 1 | 0 | 1 |
| Total | | 4 | 4 | 2 | 10 |

Medals by gender
| Gender | Gold | Silver | Bronze | Total |
|---|---|---|---|---|
| Male | 2 | 2 | 1 | 5 |
| Female | 2 | 2 | 1 | 5 |
| Mixed | 0 | 0 | 0 | 0 |
| Total | 4 | 4 | 2 | 10 |

Multiple medalists
| Athlete | Event | 1st place, gold medalist(s) | 2nd place, silver medalist(s) | 3rd place, bronze medalist(s) | Total |
| Selengee Demberel | Archery | 0 | 1 | 1 | 2 |

== Competitors ==
Following is the list of sports and number of athletes that represented Mongolia in this edition:

| Sport | Men | Women | Total |
|---|---|---|---|
| Archery | 2 | 2 | 4 |
| Athletics | 7 | 4 | 11 |
| Boccia | 2 | 1 | 3 |
| Judo | 4 | 2 | 6 |
| Powerlifting | 1 | - | 1 |
| Shooting | - | 1 | 1 |
| Sitting Volleyball | - | 11 | 11 |
| Swimming | 1 | 1 | 2 |
| Table tennis | 2 | - | 2 |
| Taekwondo | 3 | 1 | 4 |
| Total | 22 | 23 | 45 |

== Archery ==
Mongolia sent a contingent of four athletes (two men and two women) in Recurve Archery. The archers won a silver and a bronze medal.

Individual

| Archer | Event | Ranking Round | | Round of 16 | Quarterfinals | Semi-finals | Final / BM | |
| Archer | Event | Score | Seed | Opposition Score | Opposition Score | Opposition Score | Opposition Score | Rank |
|---|---|---|---|---|---|---|---|---|
| Selengee Demberel | Women's recurve | 564 | 7 | Babahabib (IRI) W 6–5 | Bhawna (IND) W 6–2 | Ross (INA) W 6–2 | Gao (CHN) L 3–7 | 2nd place, silver medalist(s) |
| Oyun-Erdene Buyanjargal | Women's recurve | 514 | 12 | Gao (CHN) L 0–6 | Did not advance | | | 10 |
| Munkhbaatar Purevsed | Men's recurve | 555 | 21 | Li (TPE) L 1–7 | Did not advance | | | 20 |
| Munkhbaatar Namjilmaa | Men's recurve | 554 | 22 | Setiawan (INA) L 2–6 | Did not advance | | | 21 |

Mixed

| Archer | Event | Ranking Round | | Round of 16 | Quarterfinals | Semi-finals | Final / BM | |
| Archer | Event | Score | Seed | Opposition Score | Opposition Score | Opposition Score | Opposition Score | Rank |
|---|---|---|---|---|---|---|---|---|
| Selengee Demberel Oyun-Erdene Buyanjargal | Women's recurve | 1078 | 5 | Indonesia W 6–2 | China L 2–6 | - | Iran W 6–2 | 3rd place, bronze medalist(s) |
| Selengee Demberel Munkhbaatar Purevsed | Mixed recurve | 1119 | 7 | Indonesia L 4–5 | Did not advance | | | 6 |
| Munkhbaatar Purevsed Munkhbaatar Namjilmaa | Men's recurve | 1109 | 9 | Kazakhstan W 5–4 | India L 1–5 | Did not advance | | 6 |

== Boccia ==
Three athletes (two men and one woman) represented Mongolia in Boccia.

| Athlete | Event | Group stage | | | | | Quarterfinals | Semifinals | Final | |
| Athlete | Event | Opposition Score | Opposition Score | Opposition Score | Opposition Score | Rank | Opposition Score | Opposition Score | Opposition Score | Rank |
|---|---|---|---|---|---|---|---|---|---|---|
| Munkhdemberel Togootogtokh | Men's Individual BC1 | Loung (HKG) L 3–4 | Alzahrani (KSA) W 4–2 | Huadpradit (THA) L 2-6 | Did not advance | | | | | 7 |
| Irmuun Khurelbaatar | Men's Individual BC2 | Yudha (INA) L 0–17 | Lee (MAS) W 3–2 | Linchum (THA) L 0-9 | Did not advance | | | | | 8 |
| Dagmidmaa Davkharbayar | Women's Individual BC2 | Yeung (HKG) L 0–10 | Shingiskhanova (KAZ) L 4–5 | Dong (CHN) W 10–DNS | Did not advance | | | | | 8 |

== Judo ==
Mongolia sent a contingent of four athletes (two men and two women) in Judo. Two women judokas won a gold and a silver medal.

Men

| Athlete | Event | Round of 16 | Quarterfinal | Semifinal | Repechage | Final of repechage | Final / BM | |
| Athlete | Event | Opposition Result | Opposition Result | Opposition Result | Opposition Result | Opposition Result | Opposition Result | Rank |
|---|---|---|---|---|---|---|---|---|
| Ganbat Dashtseren | J1 -95 kg | Abdukulov (UZB) L 100–000^{IPP} | - | - | Adilbekov (KAZ) W 100–000^{IPP} | Matsumoto (JPN) W 011–010^{YUK} | Pambudi (INA) L 000–100^{IPP} | 5 |
| Bat-Erdene Baatarsuren | J1 -70 kg | Sultangaziev (KGZ) W 101–011^{IPP} | Parmar (IND) L 010–110^{IPP} | - | Akbarov (UZB) L 111–000^{IPP} | - | Did not advance | 7 |

Women

| Athlete | Event | Round of 16 | Quarterfinal | Semifinal | Repechage | Final / BM | |
| Athlete | Event | Opposition Result | Opposition Result | Opposition Result | Opposition Result | Opposition Result | Rank |
|---|---|---|---|---|---|---|---|
| Suvd-Erdene Togtokhbayar | J1 -52 kg | - | Larassati (INA) W 002–000^{YUK} | Tlekkabyl (KAZ) W 010–001^{W-ARI} | - | Hangai (JPN) L 001–010^{W-ARI} | 2nd place, silver medalist(s) |
| Turuunaa Lkhaijav | J1 -70 kg | - | Lkhaijav (INA) W 100–000^{IPP} | Wang (CHN) W 011–000^{W-ARI} | - | Nishimura (JPN) W 100–000^{IPP} | 1st place, gold medalist(s) |

== Powerlifting ==
Enkhbayar Sodnompiljee represented Mongolia in Powerlifting and won his second gold medal of the Asian Para Games.

Men

| Athlete | Event | Attempt 1 | Attempt 2 | Attempt 3 | Final Score | Rank |
|---|---|---|---|---|---|---|
| Enkhbayar Sodnompiljee | Up to 107kg | 231 | 236 | 246 | 246 | 1st place, gold medalist(s) |

== Sitting Volleyball ==
Mongolia's women's sitting volleyball team composed of 11 athletes. They won their classification match for 5th/6th position against Iran and secured fifth rank before ending their campaign in this edition of the games.

| Event | Group stage | | Quarterfinals | Semifinals | Final / Classification match | |
| Event | Opposition Score | Opposition Score | Opposition Score | Opposition Score | Opposition Score | Rank |
|---|---|---|---|---|---|---|
| Women's team | China L 0–3 | Iran L 0–3 | Did not advance | | South Korea W 3–2 | 5 |

== Swimming ==
Two swimmers represented Mongolia in this edition of the Games.

Men

| Athlete | Event | Heat | | Final | |
| Athlete | Event | Result | Rank | Result | Rank |
|---|---|---|---|---|---|
| Munkhtur Ulzii-Ochir | 100m Butterfly S11 | - | | 2:40.80 | 6 |
| Munkhtur Ulzii-Ochir | 100m Freestyle S11 | - | | 1:39.07 | 5 |
| Munkhtur Ulzii-Ochir | 50m Freestyle S11 | 36.65 | 9 | Did not advance | |

Women

| Athlete | Event | Heat | | Final | |
| Athlete | Event | Result | Rank | Result | Rank |
|---|---|---|---|---|---|
| Nomuun Khurel | 100m Freestyle S6 | DNS | | Did not advance | |
| Nomuun Khurel | 400m Freestyle S6 | - | | - | |
| Nomuun Khurel | 50m Freestyle S6 | - | | - | |
