= Myanmar at the 2026 Asian Para Games =

- Myanmar flag
- IPC code: MYA
- NPC: Myanmar Paralympic Sports Federation
- Website: www.paralympic.org/myanmar

in Aichi-Nagoya, Japan 18 October 2026 – 24 October 2026
- Competitors: 7 (6 men and 1 woman) in 3 sports
- Flag bearer (closing): TBD
- Medals Ranked 25th: Gold 0 Silver 1 Bronze 3 Total 4

Asian Para Games appearances (overview)
- 2010; 2014; 2018; 2022; 2026

Myanmar is participating in the 2026 Asian Para Games, in Nagoya, Aichi Prefecture, Japan, from 18 to 24 October 2026. This is Myanmar's fifth appearance at the Games.

== Medalists ==
| Medal | Athlete | Sport | Event | Date |
|---|---|---|---|---|
| (silver) Silver | Nyi Nyi Lin Htet | Swimming | Men's 150m Individual Medley SM4 | 22 October |
| (bronze) Bronze | Nyi Nyi Lin Htet | Swimming | Men's 50m Freestyle S4 | 19 October |
| (bronze) Bronze | Nyi Nyi Lin Htet | Swimming | Men's 50m Breaststroke SB3 | 20 October |
| (bronze) Bronze | Law Win Lar | Athletics | Women's 100m T64 | 21 October |

=== Summary ===
Medals by events
| Sport | Gold | Silver | Bronze | Total |
|---|---|---|---|---|
| Swimming | 0 | 1 | 2 | 3 |
| Athletics | 0 | 0 | 1 | 1 |
| Total | 0 | 1 | 3 | 4 |

Medals by day
| Day | Date | Gold | Silver | Bronze | Total |
|---|---|---|---|---|---|
| 1 | 19 October | 0 | 0 | 1 | 1 |
| 2 | 20 October | 0 | 0 | 1 | 1 |
| 3 | 21 October | 0 | 0 | 1 | 1 |
| 4 | 22 October | 0 | 1 | 0 | 1 |
| Total | | 0 | 1 | 3 | 4 |

Medals by gender
| Gender | Gold | Silver | Bronze | Total |
|---|---|---|---|---|
| Female | 0 | 0 | 1 | 1 |
| Male | 0 | 1 | 2 | 3 |
| Mixed | 0 | 0 | 0 | 0 |
| Total | 0 | 1 | 3 | 4 |

Multiple medalists
| Athlete | Event | 1st place, gold medalist(s) | 2nd place, silver medalist(s) | 3rd place, bronze medalist(s) | Total |
| Nyi Nyi Lin Htet | Swimming | 0 | 1 | 2 | 3 |

== Competitors ==
Following is the list of sports and number of athletes that will participate in the upcoming edition:

| Sport | Men | Women | Total |
|---|---|---|---|
| Athletics | 4 | 1 | 5 |
| Swimming | 1 | - | 1 |
| Taekwondo | 1 | - | 1 |
| Total | 6 | 1 | 7 |

== Athletics ==
Track events
Men

| Athlete | Event | Class | Heat | | Final | |
| Athlete | Event | Class | Result | Rank | Result | Rank |
|---|---|---|---|---|---|---|
| Soe Pea | 100 m | T64 | —N/a | | 13.40 | 5 |
| Soe Pea | 200 m | T64 | —N/a | | 26.79 | 7 |
| San Tin | 400 m | T47 | 53.78 | 5q | 53.93 | 7 |

Women

| Athlete | Event | Class | Heat | | Final | |
| Athlete | Event | Class | Result | Rank | Result | Rank |
|---|---|---|---|---|---|---|
| Win Law Lar | 100 m | T64 | —N/a | | 14.67 | 3rd place, bronze medalist(s) |

Field events
Men

| Athlete | Event | Class | Qualification | | Final | |
| Athlete | Event | Class | Result | Rank | Result | Rank |
|---|---|---|---|---|---|---|
| Aung Myint Myat | High Jump | T47 | —N/a | | 1.70 | 4 |
| Min Tun Zaw | High Jump | T63 | —N/a | | 1.60 | 4 |
| Aung Myint Myat | Long Jump | T47 | —N/a | | 5.92 | 6 |

Women

| Athlete | Event | Class | Qualification | | Final | |
| Athlete | Event | Class | Result | Rank | Result | Rank |
|---|---|---|---|---|---|---|
| Win Law Lar | Long Jump | T64 | —N/a | | 3.76 | 6 |

== Taekwondo ==
Men

| Athlete | Event | Round of 16 | Quarterfinal | Semifinal | Repechage | Final / BM | |
| Athlete | Event | Opposition Result | Opposition Result | Opposition Result | Opposition Result | Opposition Result | Rank |
|---|---|---|---|---|---|---|---|
| Thein Htike Aung | K44 - 58 kg | Hamraz (AFG) L 0–2 | Did not advance | | | | 9 |

== Swimming ==
Men

| Athlete | Event | Heat | | Final | |
| Athlete | Event | Result | Rank | Result | Rank |
|---|---|---|---|---|---|
| Nyi Nyi Lin Htet | 50 m breaststroke SB3 | —N/a | | 59.30 | 3rd place, bronze medalist(s) |
| Nyi Nyi Lin Htet | 100 m freestyle S4 | 23 Oct | | | |
| Nyi Nyi Lin Htet | 150 m individual medley SM4 | —N/a | | 3:01.23 | 2nd place, silver medalist(s) |
| Nyi Nyi Lin Htet | 50 m freestyle S4 | 45.14 | 2Q | 44.53 | 3rd place, bronze medalist(s) |
