= United Arab Emirates at the 2026 Asian Para Games =

- Flag of UAE
- IPC code: UAE
- NPC: UAE Paralympic Committee
- Website: https://www.paralympic.org/npc/united-arab-emirates

in Aichi-Nagoya, Japan 18 October 2026 – 24 October 2026
- Competitors: 45 (31 men and 14 women) in 8 sports
- Medals Ranked 17th: Gold 2 Silver 2 Bronze 5 Total 9

Asian Para Games appearances
- 2010; 2014; 2018; 2022; 2026

United Arab Emirates (UAE) participated in the 2026 Asian Para Games, in Nagoya, Aichi Prefecture, Japan, from 18 to 24 October 2026. This is UAE's fifth appearance at the Games.

== Medalists ==
Medal	Athlete	Sport	Event	Date
(gold) Gold	Noura Alketbi	Athletics	Women's Shot Put F32	22 October
(gold) Gold	Thekra Alkaabi	Athletics	Women's 100m T71/T72	23 October
(silver) Silver	Maryam Alzeyoudi	Athletics	Women's Shot Put F40	20 October
(silver) Silver	Maryam Alzeyoudi	Athletics	Women's Discus Throw F40	22 October
(bronze) Bronze	Mohamad Othman	Athletics	Men's 100m T33/T34	20 October
(bronze) Bronze	Ahmed Alhosani	Athletics	Men's Shot Put F33	20 October
(bronze) Bronze	Abdulla Albalooshi	Cycling	Men's C4 4000m Individual Pursuit	20 October
(bronze) Bronze	Thekra Alkaabi	Athletics	Women's Shot Put F32	22 October
(bronze) Bronze	Ahmed Albedwawi	Cycling	Men's C4-5 Road Race	23 October

=== Summary ===
Medals by events
Sport	Gold	Silver	Bronze	Total
Athletics	2	2	3	7
Cycling	0	0	2	2
Total	2	2	5	9

Medals by day
Day	Date	Gold	Silver	Bronze	Total
1	19 October	0	0	0	0
2	20 October	0	1	3	4
3	21 October	0	0	0	0
4	22 October	1	1	1	3
5	23 October	1	0	1	2
6	24 October	0	0	0	0
Total		2	2	5	9

Medals by gender
Gender	Gold	Silver	Bronze	Total
Female	2	2	1	5
Male	0	0	4	4
Mixed	0	0	0	0
Total	2	2	4	9

Multiple medalists
Athlete	Event	1st place, gold medalist(s)	2nd place, silver medalist(s)	3rd place, bronze medalist(s)	Total
Thekra Alkaabi	Athletics	1	0	1	2
Maryam Alzeyoudi	Athletics	0	2	0	2

== Competitors ==
Following is the list of sports and number of athletes that represented UAE:

Sport	Men	Women	Total
Archery	1	-	1
Athletics	6	5	11
Badminton	3	1	4
Boccia	1	1	2
Cycling	3	1	4
Powerlifting	8	3	11
Shooting	7	3	10
Table tennis	2	-	2
Total	31	14	45
