= Tatsuya Ito =

Tatsuya Ito may refer to:

- Tatsuya Ito (politician) (born 1961), Japanese politician and minister
- Tatsuya Ito (footballer) (born 1997), Japanese footballer
