= Archery at the 2026 Asian Para Games =

- Location: Okazaki, Japan
- Dates: 19–24 October
- Competitors: 99 from 19 nations

Archery at the 2026 Asian Para Games was held in Okazaki, Japan between 19 and 24 October 2026.

== Nations ==
1. Bangladesh (2)
2. Bhutan (1)
3. China (12)
4. Hong Kong (3)
5. India (11)
6. Indonesia (7)
7. Iran (5)
8. Iraq (3)
9. Japan (7)
10. Kazakhstan (9)
11. South Korea (7)
12. Malaysia (4)
13. Mongolia (4)
14. Philippines (4)
15. Singapore (1)
16. Chinese Taipei (7)
17. Thailand (10)
18. United Arab Emirates (1)
19. Uzbekistan (1)

== Entries ==
Events	MI	WI	MT	WT	XT
Recurve	22	15	9	6	8
Compound	25	18	10	5	11
W1	13	6	5	2	3

MI = Men Individual
WI = Women Individual
MT = Men Team (Doubles)
WT = Women Team (Doubles)
XT = Mixed Team (Doubles)

== Medal table ==
* Host nation (Japan)

Rank	NPC	Gold	Silver	Bronze	Total
1	China	9	4	6	19
2	India	3	3	0	6
3	South Korea	2	0	1	3
4	Thailand	1	0	2	3
5	Indonesia	0	3	1	4
6	Iran	0	1	1	2
6	Kazakhstan	0	1	1	2
6	Mongolia	0	1	1	2
9	Singapore	0	1	0	1
Totals (9 entries)		15	14	13	42

== Medalists ==
=== Men ===
Event	Class	Gold	Silver	Bronze
Individual	W1	Li Pan; China	Zhang Yianxin; China	Nurshat Toleukassym; Kazakhstan
Doubles	W1	China (CHN); Li Pan; Zhang Tianxin	Kazakhstan (KAZ); Temirlan Seitkamal; Nurshat Toleukassym	Thailand (THA); Suphawat Samutchaiyakij; Chaiwat Srinaulsoong
Individual compound	Open	Ai Xinliang; China	Amirmohammad Barani; Iran	Zhang Yicheng; China
Individual recurve	Open			
Doubles compound	Open	Thailand (THA); Teerasak Phiarthanee; Comsan Singpirom	Indonesia (INA); Arif Firmansyah; Ken Swagumilang	China (CHN); Ai Xinliang; Zhang Yicheng
Doubles recurve	Open			

=== Women ===
Event	Class	Gold	Silver	Bronze
Individual	W1	Cen Mengkan; China	Swati Chaudhary; India	Kim Ok-geum; South Korea
Doubles	W1	China (CHN); Cen Mengkan; Wang Liya	not awarded due to lack of competitors	
Individual compound	Open	Sheetal Devi; India	Nur Syahidah Alim; Singapore	Xu Xueqing; China
Individual recurve	Open			
Doubles compound	Open	China (CHN); Xu Xueqing; Zhao Jing	India (IND); Sheetal Devi; Payal Nag	Thailand (THA); Wasana Khuthawisap; Phannibha Srathongmaew
Doubles recurve	Open			

=== Mixed ===
Event	Class	Gold	Silver	Bronze
Team	W1	South Korea (KOR); Park Hong-jo; Kim Ok-geum	China (CHN); Zhang Tianxin; Cen Mengkan	not awarded
Team compound	Open	India (IND); Toman Kumar; Sheetal Devi	Indonesia (INA); Ken Swagumilang; Teodora Ferelly	China (CHN); Zhang Yicheng; Xu Xueqing
Team recurve	Open			
