= Rooba Al-Omari =

Bahrain Paralympic athlete

Rooba Alomari
Personal information
- Nationality: Bahrain
- Born: 23 January 1991 (age 35) Bahrain

Sport
- Sport: Paralympic athletics
- Disability class: F55, F56
- Event(s): discus throw, Javelin throw, shot put
Medal record
Women's para-athletics
Representing Bahrain
Asian Para Games
Bronze medal – third place	2022 Hangzhou	Javelin throw F56
Islamic Solidarity Games
Gold medal – first place	2025 Riyadh	Shot Put F55/56

Rooba Alomari (born 23 January 1991) is a Bahraini para-athlete who specializes in throwing events, mainly in discus throw.

== Career ==
Rooba's first major championship was at the 2015 IPC Athletics World Championships. Here she placed 9th in the Discus throw and 11th in the Javelin throw.

Rooba was selected to compete for Bahrain at the 2016 Summer Paralympics. She placed 7th in the discus throw.

Following her 12-month ban, at the 2017 World Para Athletics Championships, she placed 4th in the discus and 7th in both the Javelin and Shot put events.

Rooba qualified for the delayed 2020 Summer Paralympics, placing 5th in the discus throw.

Following the 2020 paralympics, Rooba won a bronze medal with a seasons best of 17.26 metres in the Javelin Throw and placed 5th in the discus at the 2022 Asian Para Games.

At the 2023 World Para Athletics Championships, she placed 5th in the discus throw. The following year, she went one better and placed 4th.

Rooba qualified for her third Paralympic Games. At the 2024 Summer Paralympics, she was chosen to be the Bahrain flag bearer alongside Husain Mohamed. She placed 6th in the discus throw.

== Doping ==
In 2019, Rooba was suspended for committing an anti-doping rule violation. This was due to failing to provide a sample collection, due to not having the correct equipment, which is the athletes responsibility to make sure they have.

She had to forfeit all results during that she had at the games and was suspended for a period of 12 months.
