= 2026 Asian Para Games medal table =

The 2026 Asian Para Games (Japanese: 2026年アジアパラ競技大会, romanized: 2026-Nen ajiapara kyōgi taikai), also known as the 5th Asian Para Games and commonly known as the Aichi-Nagoya 2026 Asian Para Games, is a multi-sport event that parallels the 2026 Asian Games which is being held for Asian athletes with disabilities in Nagoya, Aichi Prefecture, Japan from 18 to 24 October 2026.

== Medal table ==
https://results.apg2026.org/#/medals/standings

* Host nation (Japan)

2026 Asian Para Games medal table
Rank	NPC	Gold	Silver	Bronze	Total
1	China	207	117	111	435
2	Japan*	64	60	62	186
3	Uzbekistan	45	49	51	145
4	India	30	35	49	114
5	South Korea	29	38	33	100
6	Iran	26	36	40	102
7	Thailand	19	40	66	125
8	Indonesia	15	21	37	73
9	Kazakhstan	12	16	22	50
10	Saudi Arabia	8	8	1	17
11	Iraq	7	8	8	23
12	Malaysia	6	8	13	27
13	Chinese Taipei	4	7	9	20
14	Mongolia	4	4	2	10
15	Hong Kong	3	14	24	41
16	Sri Lanka	2	4	3	9
17	United Arab Emirates	2	2	5	9
18	Philippines	2	2	3	7
19	Jordan	2	1	2	5
20	Vietnam	1	2	2	5
21	Kuwait	1	0	2	3
22	Kyrgyzstan	1	0	0	1
23	Singapore	0	6	5	11
24	Qatar	0	2	2	4
25	Myanmar	0	1	4	5
26	Bahrain	0	1	2	3
27	North Korea	0	1	1	2
28	Pakistan	0	1	0	1
28	Tajikistan	0	1	0	1
28	Timor-Leste	0	1	0	1
31	Cambodia	0	0	1	1
31	Oman	0	0	1	1
31	Syria	0	0	1	1
Totals (33 entries)		490	486	562	1,538

== See also ==
- 2026 Asian Games medal table
