= Uzbekistan at the 2026 Asian Para Games =

Sporting event delegation

- IPC code: UZB
- NPC: National Paralympic Committee of Uzbekistan

in Aichi-Nagoya 18—24 October 2026
- Competitors: 153 in 11 sports
- Flag bearers: Asadbek Toshtemirov; Marjona Pardaboyeva
- Medals Ranked 3rd: Gold 45 Silver 49 Bronze 51 Total 145

Asian Para Games appearances
- 2010; 2014; 2018; 2022; 2026

Uzbekistan is participating in the 2026 Asian Para Games held in Aichi Prefecture and Nagoya, Japan, from 18 to 24 October 2026. The National Paralympic Committee of Uzbekistan entered 153 competitors participating in 11 sports. Paralympic para-taekwondo champion Asadbek Toshtemirov and para-cycling world champion Marjona Pardaboyeva served as the flag bearers for Uzbekistan during the opening ceremony.

A formal send-off event for the delegation was hosted at the Museum of Olympic and Paralympic Glory in Tashkent. The National Paralympic Committee of Uzbekistan actively participated in "Road to Aichi-Nagoya 2026" international seminars and training programs to prepare the expanded roster.

== Medals by sport ==
Medals by sport
Sport	1st place, gold medalist(s)	2nd place, silver medalist(s)	3rd place, bronze medalist(s)	Total
Athletics	20	21	23	64
Cycling	4	7	3	14
Judo	4	5	6	15
Powerlifting	5	2	3	10
Swimming	11	10	8	29
Taekwondo	1	4	8	13
Total	45	49	51	145

== Medals by day ==
Medals by day
Day	Date	1st place, gold medalist(s)	2nd place, silver medalist(s)	3rd place, bronze medalist(s)	Total
1	October 19	6	10	6	22
2	October 20				
3	October 21				
4	October 22				
5	October 23				
6	October 24				
7	October 25	0	0	0	0
Total		6	10	6	22

== Competitors ==
UZB UZB Uzbekistan Disciplines Men Women Total Para Archery 1 0 1 Para Athletics 30 28 58 Boccia 1 1 2 Para Cycling 6 6 12 Para Judo 12 9 21 Para Powerlifting 5 10 15 Shooting Para Sport 0 4 4 Para Swimming 5 6 11 Para Table Tennis 1 0 1 Para Taekwondo 7 10 17 Para Fencing 3 3 6

== Archery ==
Individual

Archer	Event	Ranking Round		Round of 32	Round of 16	Quarterfinals	Semi-finals	Final / BM	
Archer	Event	Score	Seed	Opposition Score	Opposition Score	Opposition Score	Opposition Score	Opposition Score	Rank
Abdulvakhkhob Kirgizboev	Men's compound	670	18	Burgos (PHI); L 137–14047	Did not advance				

== Athletics ==
Track events

Athlete	Event	Heat		Final	
Athlete	Event	Result	Rank	Result	Rank
[[]]					
Asila Mirzayorova	Women's 200m T11	26.07 SB	2 q		
Gulnora Tuychieva	Women's 200m T11	28.03 PB	2	Did not advance	
Nozima Saydullaeva	Women's 200m T11	29.02 PB	2	Did not advance	

Field events

Athlete	Event	Qualification		Final	
Athlete	Event	Result	Rank	Result	Rank
[[]]					
Omadbek Khasanov	Men's long jump T47	—N/a		6.99 SB	2nd place, silver medalist(s)
Khusniddin Norbekov	Men's shot put F35	—N/a		15.43 SB	1st place, gold medalist(s)
Asilbek Mukimov	Men's shot put F37	—N/a		11.19	4
Kudratillokhon Marufkhujaev	Men's shot put F37	—N/a		16.66 GR	1st place, gold medalist(s)
Tolibboy Yuldashev	Men's shot put F37	—N/a		15.79 SB	2nd place, silver medalist(s)
Makhliyo Akramova	Women's club throw F32/51	—N/a		24.08 GR	1st place, gold medalist(s)
Zokhira Kozokova	Women's discus throw F37/38	—N/a		27.84 PB	3rd place, bronze medalist(s)
Mohigul Sharobidinova	Women's discus throw F56/57	22.28 PB	2 q		
Nurkhon Kurbanova	Women's javelin throw F55/56	14.48	1 q		

== See also ==
- Uzbekistan at the 2026 Asian Games
