= China at the 2026 Asian Para Games =

- Chinese flag
- IPC code: CHN

in Aichi-Nagoya, Japan 18 October 2026 – 24 October 2026
- Flag bearer (opening): TBD
- Flag bearer (closing): TBD
- Medals Ranked 1st: Gold 207 Silver 117 Bronze 111 Total 435

Asian Para Games appearances (overview)
- 2010; 2014; 2018; 2022; 2026

China participated in the 2026 Asian Para Games, held in Nagoya, Aichi Prefecture, Japan, from 18 to 24 October 2026.

== Competitor ==
CHN CHN China Disciplines Men Women Total Para Archery 6 6 12 Para Athletics 20 41 61 Para Badminton 11 14 25 Boccia 4 4 8 Para Cycling 4 4 8 Blind Football 10 0 10 Goalball 6 6 12 Para Judo 6 7 13 Para Powerlifting 10 10 20 Shooting Para Sport 10 5 15 Sitting Volleyball 12 11 23 Para Swimming 17 17 34 Para Table Tennis 8 11 19 Para Taekwondo 1 7 8 Wheelchair Basketball 12 12 24 Para Fencing 10 9 19 Wheelchair Tennis 2 2 4

== Medalists ==
Medal	Athlete	Sport	Event	Date

=== Summary ===
Medals by events
Sport	Gold	Silver	Bronze	Total
Total				

Medals by day
Day	Date	Gold	Silver	Bronze	Total
1	19 October				
Total					

Medals by gender
Gender	Gold	Silver	Bronze	Total
Female				
Male				
Mixed				
Total				

Multiple medalists
Athlete	Event	1st place, gold medalist(s)	2nd place, silver medalist(s)	3rd place, bronze medalist(s)	Total

== Badminton ==
Men's Singles

Athlete	Event	Group stage				Round of 16	Quarterfinals	Semifinals	Final	
Athlete	Event	Opposition Score	Opposition Score	Opposition Score	Rank	Opposition Score	Opposition Score	Opposition Score	Opposition Score	Rank
[[]]										
Qu Zimo	WH1	Choi (KOR); W 21–11, 21–11	Eguchi (JPN); W 21–8, 21–6	Dung (TPE); W 21–4, 21–8	1 Q	—N/a	Nishimura (JPN); W 21–12, 21–14	Jin (KOR); W 21–14, 21–7	Park (KOR); W 21–9, 21–8	1st place, gold medalist(s)
Mai Jianpeng	WH2	Hubaida (IND); W 21–11, 21–9	Oyama (JPN); L 12–21, 12–21	—N/a	2 Q	Srikumar (IND); W 21–16, 22–20	Oyama (JPN); W 15–21, 21–15, 21–11	Kajiwara (JPN); L 4–21, 15–21	—N/a	3rd place, bronze medalist(s)
Wu Xingcheng	WH2	Murad (UAE); W 21–5, 21–2	Kim (KOR); W 21–11, 21–7	—N/a	1 Q	—N/a	Andri (INA); W 21–11, 21–10	Yu (KOR); L 14–21, 10–21	—N/a	3rd place, bronze medalist(s)
Zhao Xin	WH2	Supriadi (INA); W 21–11, 21–10	Kajiwara (JPN); L 12–21, 5–21	—N/a	2 Q	Almakinah (KSA); W 21–9, 21–6	Yu (KOR); L 23–25, 12–21	Did not advance		
