= India at the 2026 Asian Para Games =

- Indian flag
- IPC code: IND
- NPC: Paralympic Committee of India (PCI)
- Website: www.paralympicindia.com

in Aichi-Nagoya, Japan 18 October 2026 – 24 October 2026
- Competitors: 167 (111 men and 56 women) in 11 sports
- Flag bearers (opening): Pramod Bhagat; Simran Sharma
- Flag bearers (closing): Nishad Kumar; Mona Agarwal
- Medals Ranked 4th: Gold 30 Silver 35 Bronze 49 Total 114

Asian Para Games appearances (overview)
- 2010; 2014; 2018; 2022; 2026

The Republic of India competed in the 2026 Asian Para Games, held in Nagoya, Aichi Prefecture, Japan, from 18 to 24 October 2026. This was India's fifth appearance at the Games. A total of 167 athletes competed across 11 disciplines. Pramod Bhagat (badminton) and Simran Sharma (athletics) were the nation's flag-bearers during the opening ceremony.

India crossed the 100-medal mark for the second consecutive time, winning 114 medals (including 30 gold medals), achieving its best medal haul in Games history and finishing fourth in the medal tally. The country also secured two paralympic quotas in shooting for the 2028 Summer Paralympics. Nishad Kumar (athletics) and Mona Agarwal (shooting) were the flag-bearers during the closing ceremony.

== Medalists ==
Medal	Athlete	Sport	Event	Date
(gold) Gold	Mona Agarwal	Shooting	Women's 10 m air rifle SH1	19 October
(gold) Gold	Nishad Kumar	Athletics	Men's long jump T47	19 October
(gold) Gold	Soumya Kumar	Athletics	Women's 1500 m T12-13	19 October
(gold) Gold	Rinku Hooda	Athletics	Men's javelin throw F46	19 October
(gold) Gold	Deepthi Jeevanji	Athletics	Women's 400 m T20	20 October
(gold) Gold	Pranav Soorma	Athletics	Men's discus throw F51-53	20 October
(gold) Gold	Simran Sharma	Athletics	Women's 200 m T12	20 October
(gold) Gold	Nishad Kumar	Athletics	Men's high jump T47	20 October
(gold) Gold	Devender Kumar	Athletics	Men's discus throw F43/44/62/64	20 October
(gold) Gold	Ayush Verma	Athletics	Men's shot put F53	21 October
(gold) Gold	Praveen Kumar	Athletics	Men's high jump T64	21 October
(gold) Gold	Sachin Khilari	Athletics	Men's shot put F46	21 October
(gold) Gold	Simran Sharma	Athletics	Women's 100 m T12	21 October
(gold) Gold	Dilip Gavit	Athletics	Men's 100 m T47	21 October
(gold) Gold	Suvarna Raj	Athletics	Women's discus throw F54	22 October
(gold) Gold	Toman Kumar; Sheetal Devi	Archery	Mixed compound team	22 October
(gold) Gold	Sheetal Devi	Archery	Women's compound individual	22 October
(gold) Gold	Anjanaben Bumbadiya	Athletics	Women's 400 m T47	22 October
(gold) Gold	Shailesh Kumar	Athletics	Men's high jump T63	22 October
(gold) Gold	Dilip Gavit	Athletics	Men's 400 m T47	22 October
(gold) Gold	Solairaj Dharmaraj	Athletics	Men's long jump T44/62/64	22 October
(gold) Gold	Harvinder Singh; Vijay Sundi	Archery	Men's recurve doubles	23 October
(gold) Gold	Sandeep	Athletics	Men's 400 m T64	23 October
(gold) Gold	Haney	Athletics	Men's javelin throw T37/38	23 October
(gold) Gold	Nitesh Kumar	Badminton	Men's Singles SL3	23 October
(gold) Gold	Naveen Sivakumar	Badminton	Men's Singles SL4	23 October
(gold) Gold	Mona Agarwal	Shooting	Women's 50 m rifle three positions SH1	23 October
(gold) Gold	Manasi Joshi; Thulasimathi Murugesan	Badminton	Women's doubles SL3-SU5	23 October
(gold) Gold	Sumit Antil	Athletics	Men's javelin throw F42-44/61-64	23 October
(gold) Gold	Pranav Soorma	Athletics	Men's club throw F51	23 October
(silver) Silver	Avani Lekhara	Shooting	Women's 10 m air rifle SH1	19 October
(silver) Silver	Kokila Kaushiklate	Judo	Women's J2 −52 kg	19 October
(silver) Silver	Ravi Budigina	Swimming	Men's 100 m freestyle S13	19 October
(silver) Silver	Radha Venkatesh	Athletics	Women's 1500 m T12-13	19 October
(silver) Silver	Ajeet Singh Yadav	Athletics	Men's javelin throw F46	19 October
(silver) Silver	Pradeep Kumar	Athletics	Men's javelin throw F53/54	20 October
(silver) Silver	Manish Narwal	Shooting	Men's 10 m air pistol SH1	20 October
(silver) Silver	Ashok Malik	Powerlifting	Men's 65 kg	20 October
(silver) Silver	Ram Ratan Singh	Athletics	Men's discus throw F51-53	20 October
(silver) Silver	Preethi Pal	Athletics	Women's 200 m T35	20 October
(silver) Silver	Rakesh Kumar	Athletics	Men's discus throw F43/44/62/64	20 October
(silver) Silver	Sheetal Devi; Payal Nag	Archery	Women's compound doubles	21 October
(silver) Silver	Banti	Athletics	Men's high jump T64	21 October
(silver) Silver	Bhagyashree Jadhav	Athletics	Women's shot put F34	21 October
(silver) Silver	Mohd Yasser	Athletics	Men's shot put F46	21 October
(silver) Silver	Manjeet Vyas	Athletics	Men's javelin throw F12/13	21 October
(silver) Silver	Kasthuri Rajamani	Powerlifting	Women's 67 kg	21 October
(silver) Silver	Krishna Nagar; Sivarajan Solaimalai	Badminton	Men's doubles SH6	21 October
(silver) Silver	Preethi Pal	Athletics	Women's 100 m T35	21 October
(silver) Silver	Akira Banothu	Athletics	Men's 400 m T35/38	21 October
(silver) Silver	Mohammed Basil	Athletics	Men's 100 m T47	21 October
(silver) Silver	Ravi Budigina	Swimming	Men's 100 m backstroke S13	21 October
(silver) Silver	Swati Chaudhary	Archery	Women's W1 individual	22 October
(silver) Silver	Kapil Kumar	Swimming	Men's 400 m freestyle S10	22 October
(silver) Silver	Tejalben Damor	Athletics	Women's 400 m T12	22 October
(silver) Silver	Jayanti Behera	Athletics	Women's 400 m T47	22 October
(silver) Silver	Varun Singh Bhati	Athletics	Men's high jump T63	22 October
(silver) Silver	Nimisha Suresh	Athletics	Women's long jump T47	23 October
(silver) Silver	Parmod Bijarnia	Athletics	Men's 1500 m T46	23 October
(silver) Silver	Pramod Bhagat	Badminton	Men's Singles SL3	23 October
(silver) Silver	Thulasimathi Murugesan	Badminton	Women's Singles SU5	23 October
(silver) Silver	Nithya Sre Sivan	Badminton	Women's Singles SH6	23 October
(silver) Silver	Pooja Jatyan; Bhawna Choudhary	Archery	Women's recurve doubles	23 October
(silver) Silver	Nitesh Kumar; Thulasimathi Murugesan	Badminton	Mixed Doubles SL3-SU5	23 October
(silver) Silver	Mahendra Gurjar	Athletics	Men's javelin throw F42-44/61-64	23 October
(bronze) Bronze	Kapil Parmar	Judo	Men's J1 −70 kg	19 October
(bronze) Bronze	Ravanni Valasanaini	Athletics	Women's 1500 m T11	19 October
(bronze) Bronze	Bhavinaben Patel	Table tennis	Women's class 4/5 singles	20 October
(bronze) Bronze	Ayush Verma	Athletics	Men's javelin throw F53/54	20 October
(bronze) Bronze	Sonalben Patel	Table tennis	Women's class 3 singles	20 October
(bronze) Bronze	Praveen Sharma	Athletics	Men's shot put F11	20 October
(bronze) Bronze	Prachi Pandey	Table tennis	Women's class 6 singles	20 October
(bronze) Bronze	Baby Sahana Ravi	Table tennis	Women's class 9 singles	20 October
(bronze) Bronze	Jehan Madan	Table tennis	Men's class 1 singles	20 October
(bronze) Bronze	Shrishti Arora	Shooting	Women's 10 m air pistol SH1	20 October
(bronze) Bronze	Himanshu Nandal	Swimming	Men's 400 m freestyle S11	20 October
(bronze) Bronze	Tejalben Damor	Athletics	Women's 200 m T12	20 October
(bronze) Bronze	Niranjan Mukundan	Swimming	Men's 200 m individual medley SM7	20 October
(bronze) Bronze	Pardeep Kumar	Athletics	Men's discus throw F43/44/62/64	20 October
(bronze) Bronze	Hokato Hotozhe Sema	Athletics	Men's shot put F56/57	20 October
(bronze) Bronze	Anubhav Choudhary	Athletics	Men's 100 m T35	21 October
(bronze) Bronze	Parveen	Athletics	Men's shot put F46	21 October
(bronze) Bronze	Rakeshbhai Bhatt	Athletics	Men's 100 m T37	21 October
(bronze) Bronze	Alphia James; Pallavi Kaluvehalli	Badminton	Women's doubles WH1-2	21 October
(bronze) Bronze	Ravi Rongali	Athletics	Men's shot put F40	21 October
(bronze) Bronze	Himanshu Nandal	Swimming	Men's 100 m breaststroke SB11	21 October
(bronze) Bronze	Karamjyoti Dalal	Athletics	Women's discus throw F55	21 October
(bronze) Bronze	Sukhchain	Athletics	Men's javelin throw F55	21 October
(bronze) Bronze	Pranav Desai	Athletics	Men's 100 m T64	21 October
(bronze) Bronze	Rohit Kumar	Swimming	Men's 100 m breaststroke SB4	21 October
(bronze) Bronze	Haney	Athletics	Men's discus throw F37	21 October
(bronze) Bronze	Shailesh Kumar	Athletics	Men's long jump T42/61/63	21 October
(bronze) Bronze	Sharath Shankarappa	Athletics	Men's 1500 m T12/T13	21 October
(bronze) Bronze	Pramod Bhagat; Manisha Ramadass	Badminton	Mixed Doubles SL3-SU5	22 October
(bronze) Bronze	Krishna Nagar; Nithya Sre Sivan	Badminton	Mixed doubles SH6	22 October
(bronze) Bronze	Suhas Yathiraj	Badminton	Men's Singles SL4	22 October
(bronze) Bronze	Abhijeet Sakhuja	Badminton	Men's Singles SL4	22 October
(bronze) Bronze	Sanjana Kumari	Badminton	Women's singles SL3	22 October
(bronze) Bronze	Shubham Wadhwa; Bhavinaben Patel	Table tennis	Mixed doubles XD7	22 October
(bronze) Bronze	Manisha Ramadass	Badminton	Women's singles SU5	22 October
(bronze) Bronze	Rahul Saroha	Athletics	Men's high jump T63	22 October
(bronze) Bronze	Swatik Patil	Swimming	Men's 100 m breaststroke SB9	22 October
(bronze) Bronze	Naveen Sivakumar; Surya Kant Yadav	Badminton	Men's doubles SL3-SU5	22 October
(bronze) Bronze	Ravi Budigina	Swimming	Men's 50 m freestyle S13	22 October
(bronze) Bronze	Ravanni Valasanaini	Athletics	Women's 1500 m T11	22 October
(bronze) Bronze	Tejas Nandakumar	Swimming	Men's 100 m backstroke S7	22 October
(bronze) Bronze	Jehan Madan; Shubham Wadhwa	Table tennis	Men's doubles MD4	23 October
(bronze) Bronze	Ajay Kumar	Athletics	Men's 400 m T64	23 October
(bronze) Bronze	Himanshu Nandal	Swimming	Men's 100 m freestyle S11	23 October
(bronze) Bronze	Navdeep Singh	Athletics	Men's javelin throw T40/41	23 October
(bronze) Bronze	Rakeshbhai Bhatt	Athletics	Men's 200 m T37	23 October
(bronze) Bronze	Sandeep	Athletics	Men's 100 m T44	23 October
(bronze) Bronze	Sandip Sanjay Sargar	Athletics	Men's javelin throw F42-44/61-64	23 October
(bronze) Bronze	Dharambir Nain	Athletics	Men's club throw F51	23 October

=== Summary ===
Medals by events
Sport	Gold	Silver	Bronze	Total
Athletics	22	19	24	65
Badminton	3	5	8	16
Archery	3	3	0	6
Shooting	2	2	1	5
Swimming	0	3	8	11
Powerlifting	0	2	0	2
Judo	0	1	1	2
Table Tennis	0	0	7	7
Total	30	35	49	114

Medals by day
Day	Date	Gold	Silver	Bronze	Total
1	19 October	4	5	2	11
2	20 October	5	6	13	24
3	21 October	5	11	13	29
4	22 October	7	5	13	25
5	23 October	9	8	8	25
6	24 October	0	0	0	0
Total		30	35	49	114

Medals by gender
Gender	Gold	Silver	Bronze	Total
Male	19	19	35	73
Female	10	15	11	36
Mixed	1	1	3	5
Total	30	35	49	114

Multiple medalists
Athlete	Event	1st place, gold medalist(s)	2nd place, silver medalist(s)	3rd place, bronze medalist(s)	Total
Sheetal Devi	Archery	2	1	0	3
Thulasimathi Murugesan	Badminton	1	2	0	3
Ravi Budigina	Swimming	0	2	1	3
Himanshu Nandal	Swimming	0	0	3	3
Dilip Gavit	Athletics	2	0	0	2
Nishad Kumar	Athletics	2	0	0	2
Pranav Soorma	Athletics	2	0	0	2
Simran Sharma	Athletics	2	0	0	2
Mona Agarwal	Shooting	2	0	0	2
Nitesh Kumar	Badminton	1	1	0	2
Ayush Verma	Athletics	1	0	1	2
Haney	Athletics	1	0	1	2
Sandeep	Athletics	1	0	1	2
Shailesh Kumar	Athletics	1	0	1	2
Naveen Sivakumar	Badminton	1	0	1	2
Preethi Pal	Athletics	0	2	0	2
Rakeshbhai Bhatt	Athletics	0	1	1	2
Tejalben Damor	Athletics	0	1	1	2
Krishna Nagar	Badminton	0	1	1	2
Nithya Sre Sivan	Badminton	0	1	1	2
Pramod Bhagat	Badminton	0	1	1	2
Ravanni Valasanaini	Athletics	0	0	2	2
Manisha Ramadass	Badminton	0	0	2	2
Bhavinaben Patel	Table tennis	0	0	2	2
Jehan Madan	Table tennis	0	0	2	2
Shubham Wadhwa	Table tennis	0	0	2	2

== Competitors ==
Following is the list of sports and number of athletes that will participate in the upcoming edition:

Sport	Men	Women	Total
Archery	6	5	11
Athletics	46	16	62
Badminton	17	11	28
Boccia	1	1	2
Cycling	1	—N/a	1
Football 5-a-side	10	—N/a	10
Judo	2	5	7
Powerlifting	4	4	8
Shooting	7	6	13
Swimming	13	2	15
Table tennis	4	6	10
Total	111	56	167

== Archery ==
The Archery Association of India conducted the selection trials at the SAI NCOE in Sonipat, Haryana in May 2026.

Individual

Archer	Event	Ranking Round		Round of 16	Quarterfinals	Semi-finals	Final / BM	
Archer	Event	Score	Seed	Opposition Score	Opposition Score	Opposition Score	Opposition Score	Rank
Shyam Sundar Swami	Men's compound	688	7	Oe (JPN); W 143–139	Ai (CHN); L 146–147	Did not advance		
Toman Kumar	Men's compound	698	3	Firmansyah (INA); W 144–142	Yang (TPE); W 143^{10+}–143^{10}	Ai (CHN); L 144–149	Zhang (CHN); L 139–148	4
Payal Nag	Women's compound	675	5	Chang (TPE); W 139–137	Shinohara (JPN); L 131–135	Did not advance		
Sheetal Devi	Women's compound	704 AR	1	Chan (HKG); W 149–134 WR	Bantiloc (PHI); W 147–135	Shinohara (JPN); W 145–137	Alim (SGP); W 142–139	1st place, gold medalist(s)
Harvinder Singh	Men's recurve	631	5	Li (TPE); W 6–0	Yun (CHN); L 5^{7}–6^{7+}	Did not advance		
Vijay Sundi	Men's recurve	630	7	Tseng (TPE); L 5^{8}–6^{9}	Did not advance			
Bhawna Choudhary	Women's recurve	616	2	Sabit (KAZ); W 6–0	Demberel (MGL); L 2–6	Did not advance		
Pooja Jatyan	Women's recurve	561	9	Loh (MAS); L 2–6	Did not advance			
Adil Ansari	Men's W1	638	8	Yung (HKG); W 6–0	Zhang (CHN); L 2–6	Did not advance		
Vinayak Breed	Men's W1	594	13	Samutchaiyakij (THA); L 0–6	Did not advance			
Swati Chaudhary	Women's W1	648 GR	1	—N/a		Lee (KOR); W 6–2	Cen (CHN); L 4–6	2nd place, silver medalist(s)

Doubles

Archer	Event	Ranking Round		Round of 16	Quarterfinals	Semi-finals	Final / BM	
Archer	Event	Score	Seed	Opposition Score	Opposition Score	Opposition Score	Opposition Score	Rank
Shyam Sundar Swami; Toman Kumar	Men's compound	1386	2	—N/a	Chinese Taipei; W 154–147	Indonesia; L 155–156	China; L 153–154	4
Payal Nag; Sheetal Devi	Women's compound	1379 AR	1	—N/a		Thailand; W 151–135	China; L 141–150	2nd place, silver medalist(s)
Toman Kumar; Sheetal Devi	Mixed compound	1402 WR	1	—N/a	Japan; W 154–147	Chinese Taipei; W 142–141	Indonesia; W 151–148	1st place, gold medalist(s)
Harvinder Singh; Vijay Sundi	Men's recurve	1261	1	—N/a	Mongolia; W 5–1	South Korea; W 5^{20}–4^{18}	China; W 5–1	1st place, gold medalist(s)
Bhawna Choudhary; Pooja Jatyan	Women's recurve	1177	2	—N/a		Iran; W 6–2	China; L 0-6	2nd place, silver medalist(s)
Harvinder Singh; Bhawna Choudhary	Mixed recurve	1247	4	—N/a	Thailand; W 6–0	China; L 0-6	Iran; L 4^{18}–5^{18+}	4
Adil Ansari; Vinayak Breed	Men's W1	1232	5	—N/a	South Korea; L 4^{17}–5^{18}	Did not advance		
Adil Ansari; Swati Chaudhary	Mixed W1	1286	2	—N/a		South Korea; L 2–6	—N/a	3

== Athletics ==
Track events
Men

Athlete	Event	Class	Heat		Final	
Athlete	Event	Class	Result	Rank	Result	Rank
Sujith Sivadasan	100 m	T13	11.75	5 q	11.64	7
Anubhav Choudhary	100 m	T35	—N/a		12.72 PB	3rd place, bronze medalist(s)
Rakeshbhai Bhatt	100 m	T37	—N/a		11.50 PB	3rd place, bronze medalist(s)
Sandeep	100 m	T44	—N/a		11.67	3rd place, bronze medalist(s)
Dilip Gavit	100 m	T47	11.00	1 Q	10.69	1st place, gold medalist(s)
Mohammed Basil	100 m	T47	10.79 GR	1 Q	10.72 GR	2nd place, silver medalist(s)
Pranav Desai	100 m	T64	—N/a		11.96	3rd place, bronze medalist(s)
Anubhav Choudhary	200 m	T35	—N/a		26.48 PB	4
Rakeshbhai Bhatt	200 m	T37	—N/a		23.64	3rd place, bronze medalist(s)
Pranav Desai	200 m	T64	—N/a		24.72	5
Akira Banothu	400 m	T35/38	—N/a		51.25 GR	2nd place, silver medalist(s)
Bhavikkumar Bharwad	400 m	T45-47	49.05	2 Q	DSQ	
Dilip Gavit	400 m	T45-47	50.21	1 Q	48.27	1st place, gold medalist(s)
Ajay Kumar	400 m	T44/62/64	—N/a		53.61 GR	3rd place, bronze medalist(s)
Sandeep	400 m	T44/62/64	—N/a		52.28 WR	1st place, gold medalist(s)
Sharath Shankarappa	1500 m	T12/13	—N/a		4:11.01 SB	3rd place, bronze medalist(s)
Parmod Bijarnia	1500 m	T45/46	—N/a		4:09.65	2nd place, silver medalist(s)
Sharath Shankarappa	5000 m	T12/13	—N/a		15:27.97 PB	4

Women

Athlete	Event	Class	Heat		Final	
Athlete	Event	Class	Result	Rank	Result	Rank
Simran Sharma	100 m	T12	12.13 GR	1 Q	12.02 GR	1st place, gold medalist(s)
Preethi Pal	100 m	T35	—N/a		13.98	2nd place, silver medalist(s)
Ravanni Valasanaini	200 m	T11	29.20 PB	3	Did not advance	
Simran Sharma	200 m	T12	25.22 GR	1 Q	24.80 GR	1st place, gold medalist(s)
Tejalben Damor	200 m	T12	25.25	2 q	25.23 PB	3rd place, bronze medalist(s)
Preethi Pal	200 m	T35	—N/a		29.53	2nd place, silver medalist(s)
Anjanaben Bumbadiya	200 m	T47	26.84	4 q	26.82	7
Jayanti Behera	200 m	T47	26.75 PB	3 Q	26.81	6
Ravanni Valasanaini	400 m	T11	1:03.80 PB	2 q	1:03.64 PB	3rd place, bronze medalist(s)
Tejalben Damor	400 m	T12	58.05 GR	1 Q	57.60	2nd place, silver medalist(s)
Deepthi Jeevanji	400 m	T20	57.57 GR	1 Q	56.36 GR	1st place, gold medalist(s)
Anjanaben Bumbadiya	400 m	T47	—N/a		59.97	1st place, gold medalist(s)
Jayanti Behera	400 m	T47	—N/a		1:00.65	2nd place, silver medalist(s)
Rakshitha Raju	1500 m	T11	—N/a		DSQ	
Ravanni Valasanaini	1500 m	T11	—N/a		5:41.85 PB	3rd place, bronze medalist(s)
Radha Venkatesh	1500 m	T12/13	—N/a		5:30.90	2nd place, silver medalist(s)
Soumya Kumar	1500 m	T12/13	—N/a		5:12.39 PB	1st place, gold medalist(s)

Field events
Men

Athlete	Event	Class	Final	
Athlete	Event	Class	Result	Rank
Nishad Kumar	High jump	T47	2.04 GR	1st place, gold medalist(s)
Rahul Saroha	High jump	T63	1.81 PB	3rd place, bronze medalist(s)
Shailesh Kumar	High jump	T63	1.89 GR	1st place, gold medalist(s)
Varun Singh Bhati	High jump	T63	1.84 SB	2nd place, silver medalist(s)
Banti	High jump	T64	1.92 PB	2nd place, silver medalist(s)
Praveen Kumar	High jump	T64	2.05 GR	1st place, gold medalist(s)
Sujith Sivadasan	Long jump	T13	5.74	6
Rakeshbhai Bhatt	Long jump	T37/38	NM	
Nishad Kumar	Long jump	T47	7.11	1st place, gold medalist(s)
Mahendra Gurjar	Long jump	T42/61/63	5.56	4
Shailesh Kumar	Long jump	T42/61/63	5.57 GR	3rd place, bronze medalist(s)
Solairaj Dharmaraj	Long jump	T44/62/64	7.15 AR	1st place, gold medalist(s)
Praveen Sharma	Shot put	F11	13.86 PB	3rd place, bronze medalist(s)
Vishesh	Shot put	F32	DSQ	
Ravi Rongali	Shot put	F40	10.02	3rd place, bronze medalist(s)
Mohd Yasser	Shot put	F46	15.06 SB	2nd place, silver medalist(s)
Sachin Khilari	Shot put	F46	15.87 GR	1st place, gold medalist(s)
Parveen	Shot put	F46	14.94 SB	3rd place, bronze medalist(s)
Ayush Verma	Shot put	F53	8.16	1st place, gold medalist(s)
Hokato Hotozhe Sema	Shot put	F56/F57	14.65	3rd place, bronze medalist(s)
Soman Rana	Shot put	F56/F57	13.80	4
Amit Kumar Saroha	Club throw	F51	27.26	4
Dharambir Nain	Club throw	F51	27.71	3rd place, bronze medalist(s)
Pranav Soorma	Club throw	F51	32.87 GR	1st place, gold medalist(s)
Praveen Sharma	Discus throw	F11	30.64	4
Haney	Discus throw	F37	57.04 PB	3rd place, bronze medalist(s)
Pranav Soorma	Discus throw	F51-53	11.66 AR	1st place, gold medalist(s)
Ram Ratan Singh	Discus throw	F51-53	10.35	2nd place, silver medalist(s)
Parveen Kumar	Discus throw	F57	43.55	4
Devender Kumar	Discus throw	F43/44/ 62/64	49.71	1st place, gold medalist(s)
Pardeep Kumar	Discus throw	F43/44/ 62/64	51.15 PB	3rd place, bronze medalist(s)
Rakesh Kumar	Discus throw	F43/44/ 62/64	49.35	2nd place, silver medalist(s)
Manjeet Vyas	Javelin throw	F12/13	61.41 PB	2nd place, silver medalist(s)
Haney	Javelin throw	F37/38	60.49 WR	1st place, gold medalist(s)
Navdeep Singh	Javelin throw	F40/41	42.55	3rd place, bronze medalist(s)
Ravi Rongali	Javelin throw	F40/41	31.64	5
Ajeet Singh Yadav	Javelin throw	F46	65.02 SB	2nd place, silver medalist(s)
Rinku Hooda	Javelin throw	F46	65.11 SB	1st place, gold medalist(s)
Ayush Verma	Javelin throw	F53/54	17.88 PB	3rd place, bronze medalist(s)
Pradeep Kumar	Javelin throw	F53/54	27.45 PB	2nd place, silver medalist(s)
Sukhchain	Javelin throw	F55	29.94	3rd place, bronze medalist(s)
Parveen Kumar	Javelin throw	F56/F57	42.80	5
Mahendra Gurjar	Javelin throw	F42-44/ 61-64	59.03 GR	2nd place, silver medalist(s)
Sandip Sargar	Javelin throw	F42-44/ 61-64	64.48 GR	3rd place, bronze medalist(s)
Sumit Antil	Javelin throw	F42-44/ 61-64	72.46	1st place, gold medalist(s)

Women

Athlete	Event	Class	Final	
Athlete	Event	Class	Result	Rank
Nimisha Suresh	Long jump	T45-47	5.37	2nd place, silver medalist(s)
Bhagyashri Jadhav	Shot put	F34	8.19 PB	2nd place, silver medalist(s)
Amisha Rawat	Shot put	F45/46	11.16	4
Suvarna Raj	Discus throw	F54	15.66	1st place, gold medalist(s)
Karamjyoti Dalal	Discus throw	F55	21.60 PB	3rd place, bronze medalist(s)
Suchitra Parida	Javelin throw	F55/56	19.09 GR	4

== Badminton ==
The athletes were selected based on the World Para Ranking as of July 14.

Singles

Athlete	Event	Group stage				Round of 16	Quarterfinals	Semifinals	Final	
Athlete	Event	Opposition Score	Opposition Score	Opposition Score	Rank	Opposition Score	Opposition Score	Opposition Score	Opposition Score	Rank
Prem Kumar Ale	Men's; WH1	Widodo (INA); W 2–1 (18-21, 21-15, 21-16)	Younas (UAE); W 2–1 (20-22, 21-9, 21-10)	Ramli (MAS); L 0–2 (14-21, 15-21)	2 Q	—N/a	Park (KOR); L 0–2 (13-21, 12-21)	Did not advance		
Pallavi Kaluvehalli	Women's; WH1	Yang F (CHN); L 0–2 (13-21, 14-21)	Hu (TPE); L 0–2 (8-21, 18-21)	Tomoyose (JPN); L 0–2 (4-21, 4-21)	4	Did not advance				
Abu Hubaida	Men's; WH2	Mai (CHN); L 0–2 (11-21, 9-21)	Oyama (JPN); L 0–2 (13-21, 11-21)	—N/a	3	Did not advance				
Haris Srikumar	Men's; WH2	Andri (INA); W 2–0 (21-13, 21-17)	Al-Ameer (IRQ); W 2–0 (21-15, 21-14)	—N/a	1 Q	Mai (CHN); L 0–2 (16-21, 20-22)	Did not advance			
Alphia James	Women's; WH2	Liu YT (CHN); L 0–2 (8-21, 5-21)	Wetwithan (THA); L 0–2 (21-23, 18-21)	Yang I-c (TPE); W 2–0 (21-16, 21-17)	3	Did not advance				
Nitesh Kumar	Men's; SL3	Chamnanwet (THA); W 2–0 (21-6, 21-7)	Joo (KOR); W 2–0 (21-18, 21-16)	—N/a	1 Q	—N/a	U Kumar (IND); W 2–0 (21-8, 21-8)	Imran (INA); W 2–0 (21-19, 21-16)	Bhagat (IND); W 2–0 (21-13, 21-17)	1st place, gold medalist(s)
Pramod Bhagat	Men's; SL3	Xiong (CHN); W 2–0 (21-17, 21-16)	Lee S-h (KOR); W 2–1 (16-21, 21-14, 21-13)	—N/a	1 Q	—N/a	Fujihara (JPN); W 2–0 (21-12, 21-10)	Lee S-h (KOR); W 2–1 (16-21, 21-18, 21-17)	N Kumar (IND); L 0–2 (18-21, 16-21)	2nd place, silver medalist(s)
Umesh Kumar	Men's; SL3	Urbano (PHI); W 2–0 (21-10, 21-12)	Yi (CHN); L 0–2 (11-21, 12-21)	—N/a	2 Q	—N/a	N Kumar (IND); L 0–2 (8-21, 8-21)	Did not advance		
Manasi Joshi	Women's; SL3	Liu YM (CHN); L 1–2 (15-21, 21-14, 15-21)	Kawai (JPN); L 0–2 (3-21, 3-21)	—N/a	3	Did not advance				
Mandeep Kaur	Women's; SL3	Neeraj (IND); W 2–1 (18-21, 21-16, 21-17)	Mat Lawani (MAS); L 0–2 (5-21, 13-21)	Xiao (CHN); L 0–2 (4-21, 10-21)	3	Did not advance				
Neeraj	Women's; SL3	Kaur (IND); L 1–2 (21-18, 16-21, 17-21)	Xiao (CHN); L 0–2 (5-21, 10-21)	Mat Lawani (MAS); L 0–2 (16-21, 11-21)	4	Did not advance				
Sanjana Kumari	Women's; SL3	Zhang (CHN); W 2–0 (21-4, 21-6)	Syakuroh (INA); L 0–2 (13-21, 6-21)	—N/a	2 Q	—N/a	Liu YM (CHN); W 2–0 (21-19, 21-12)	Kawai (JPN); L 0–2 (7-21, 9-21)	—N/a	3rd place, bronze medalist(s)
Abhijeet Sakhuja	Men's; SL4	Yeh (TPE); W 2–0 (21-17, 21-12)	Teamarrom (THA); W 2–1 (19-21, 21-16, 21-10)	Adhikari (NEP); W 2–0 (21-11, 21-12)	1 Q	Chen (CHN); W 2–0 (21-8, 21-12)	Yadav (IND); W 2-0 (21-16, 21-12)	Sivakumar (IND); L 0–2 (13-21, 15-21)	—N/a	3rd place, bronze medalist(s)
Naveen Sivakumar	Men's; SL4	Ramdani (INA); W 2–0 (21-12, 21-10)	Jeon (KOR); W 2–0 (21-11, 21-11)	—N/a	1 Q	—N/a	Shin (KOR); W 2–0 (21-14, 21-4)	Sakhuja (IND); W 2–0 (21-13, 21-15)	Setiawan (INA); W 2–0 (21-9, 21-17)	1st place, gold medalist(s)
Suhas Yathiraj	Men's; SL4	Dhar (BAN); W 2–0 (21-8, 21-11)	Setiawan (INA); W 2–0 (21-8, 21-14)	—N/a	1 Q	Teamarrom (THA); W 2–0 (21-7, 21-5)	Cho (KOR); W 2–0 (21-12, 21-16)	Setiawan (INA); L 1–2 (21-23, 21-8, 15-21)	—N/a	3rd place, bronze medalist(s)
Sukant Kadam	Men's; SL4	Shin (KOR); W 2–1 (21-17, 18-21, 21-9)	Kaluge Madduma (SRI); W 2–0 (21-11, 21-9)	—N/a	1 Q	—N/a	Setiawan (INA); L 1–2 (17-21, 21-18, 15-21)	Did not advance		
Surya Kant Yadav	Men's; SL4	Ogawa (JPN); W 2–0 (21-6, 21-19)	Chen (CHN); W 2–0 (21-18, 21-16)	—N/a	1 Q	—N/a	Sakhuja (IND); L 0–2 (16-21, 12-21)	Did not advance		
Kanak Jadaun	Women's; SL4	Oktila (INA); L 0–2 (2-21, 4-21)	Huang (CHN); L 0–2 (4-21, 3-21)	Nakamura (JPN); L 0–2 (7-21, 4-21)	4	Did not advance				
Hardik Makkar	Men's; SU5	Lee J-s (KOR); W 2–1 (18-21, 21-19, 21-8)	Ahmad Sibi (MAS); W 2–1 (21-16, 16-21, 21-18)	Tay (SGP); W 2–0 (21-19, 21-7)	1 Q	Nugroho (INA); W 2–0 (21-18, 21-12)	Imai (JPN); L 0–2 (14-21, 8-21)	Did not advance		
Rakesh Pandey	Men's; SU5	Ahmad Azri (MAS); L 0–2 (15-21, 7-21)	Fang (TPE); L 0–2 (5-21, 9-21)	—N/a	3	Did not advance				
Ruthick Ragupathi	Men's; SU5	Kanai (JPN); W 2–0 (21-12, 21-13)	Somsiri (THA); W 2–0 (21-12, 21-12)	—N/a	1 Q	—N/a	Li MP (CHN); L 0–2 (19-21, 14-21)	Did not advance		
Manisha Ramadass	Women's; SU5	Viswanathan (IND); W 2–0 (21-8, 21-15)	Rahayu (INA); W 2–0 (21-10, 21-15)	Yang QX (CHN); L 0–2 (14-21, 3-21)	2 Q	—N/a		Murugesan (IND); L 1–2 (21-19, 15-21, 13-21)	—N/a	3rd place, bronze medalist(s)
Shanthiya Viswanatha	Women's; SU5	Ramadass (IND); L 0–2 (8-21, 15-21)	Yang QX (CHN); L 0–2 (7-21, 6-21)	Rahayu (INA); L 0–2 (11-21, 17-21)	4	Did not advance				
Thulasimathi Murugesan	Women's; SU5	Mohamed (BRN); W 2–0 (21-2, 21-2)	Wong L (HKG); W 2–0 (21-10, 21-4)	Li TT (CHN); W 2–0 (21-11, 21-17)	1 Q	—N/a		Ramadass (IND); W 2–1 (19-21, 21-15, 21-13)	Yang QX (CHN); L 0–2 (18-21, 11-21)	2nd place, silver medalist(s)
Krishna Nagar	Men's; SH6	Lin J-s (TPE); W 2–0 (21-5, 21-4)	Subhan (INA); W 2–0 (21-13, 21-15)	Lin NL (CHN); L 1–2 (21-15, 6-21, 19-21)	2 Q	—N/a	Meechai (THA); L 1–2 (15-21, 21-19, 17-21)	Did not advance		
Sivarajan Solaimalai	Men's; SH6	Maclang (PHI); W 2–0 (21-7, 21-6)	Wong C (HKG); W 2–0 (21-13, 21-14)	Zali (BRU); W 2–0 (21-8, 21-11)	1 Q	—N/a	Zeng (CHN); L 0–2 (15-21, 13-21)	Did not advance		
Sudarsan Muthusamy	Men's; SH6	Lee D-s (KOR); L 0–2 (15-21, 15-21)	Chu (HKG); L 0–2 (8-21, 6-21)	Aji (INA); W 2–0 (22-20, 21-19)	3	Did not advance				
Nithya Sre Sivan	Women's; SH6	Lin SB (CHN); W 2–0 (21-18, 21-13)	Sulistyawati (INA); W 2–0 (21-7, 21-8)	—N/a	1 Q	—N/a		Lin SB (CHN); W 2–1 (19-21, 21-11, 21-11)	Li FM (CHN); L 0–2 (12-21, 13-21)	2nd place, silver medalist(s)

Doubles

Athlete	Event	Group stage				Quarterfinals	Semifinals	Final	
Athlete	Event	Opposition Score	Opposition Score	Opposition Score	Rank	Opposition Score	Opposition Score	Opposition Score	Rank
Abu Hubaida; Prem Kumar Ale	Men's WH1-WH2	Almakinah / Buayti (KSA); W 2–0 (21-4, 21-2)	Kajiwara / Nishimura (JPN); L 0–2 (9-21, 5-21)	—N/a	2 Q	Noorlan / Ramli (MAS); L 0–2 (6-21, 16-21)	Did not advance		
Alphia James; Pallavi Kaluvehalli	Women's WH1-WH2	Wetwithan / Phraikaeo (THA); L 0–2 (17-21, 16-21)	Li JQ / Li HY (CHN); W 2–1 (18-21, 10-21, 21-19)	—N/a	2 Q	—N/a	Xu / Yang F (CHN); L 0–2 (3-21, 9-21)	—N/a	3rd place, bronze medalist(s)
Abu Hubaida; Pallavi Kaluvehalli	Mixed WH1-WH2	Wetwithan / Pohloh (THA); L 1–2 (7-21, 21-18, 10-21)	Qu / Liu YT (CHN); L 0–2 (8-21, 2-21)	—N/a	3	Did not advance			
Prem Kumar Ale; Alphia James	Mixed WH1-WH2	Mai / Yin (CHN); L 0–2 (15-21, 9-21)	Yang I-c / Ong (TPE); W 2–0 (21-9, 21-17)	—N/a	2 Q	Mai / Yin (CHN); L 0–2 (19-21, 16-21)	Did not advance		
Abhijeet Sakhuja; Suhas Yathiraj	Men's SL3-SU5	Kumar / Ragupathi (IND); L 0–2 (15-21, 12-21)	Lee S-h / Lee J-s (KOR); L 1–2 (15-21, 24-22, 12-21)	—N/a	3	Did not advance			
Naveen Sivakumar; Surya Kant Yadav	Men's SL3-SU5	Li / Xiong (CHN); W 2–0 (21-7, 21-19)	Imam / Dhar (BAN); W 2–0 (21-17, 21-17)	—N/a	1 Q	Kumar / Ragupathi (IND); W 2–1 (21-16, 15-21, 21-11)	Nugroho / Imran (INA); L 1–2 (8-21, 21-19, 16-21)	—N/a	3rd place, bronze medalist(s)
Nitesh Kumar; Ruthick Ragupathi	Men's SL3-SU5	Sakhuja / Yathiraj (IND); W 2–0 (21-15, 21-12)	Lee S-h / Lee J-s (KOR); L 1–2 (19-21, 21-11, 14-21)	—N/a	2 Q	Naveen / Yadav (IND); L 1–2 (16-21, 21-15, 11-21)	Did not advance		
Pramod Bhagat; Sukant Kadam	Men's SL3-SU5	Shin / Chon (KOR); L 1–2 (21-18, 19-21, 11-21)	Nugroho / Imran (INA); L 0–2 (18-21, 18-21)	—N/a	3	Did not advance			
Umesh Kumar; Rakesh Pandey	Men's SL3-SU5	Yi / Chen (CHN); L 0–2 (20-22, 16-21)	Setiawan / Ramdani (INA) L 0–2 (14-21, 10-21)	—N/a	3	Did not advance			
Mandeep Kaur; Shanthiya Viswanathan	Women's SL3-SU5	Oktila / Sadiyah (INA); L 0–2 (14-21, 9-21)	Cheng / Huang (CHN); L 0–2 (11-21, 12-21)	Wong L / Zhang (HKG); W 2–0 (21-15, 21-14)	3	Did not advance			
Manasi Joshi; Thulasimathi Murugesan	Women's SL3-SU5	Rahayu / Syakuroh (INA); W 2–1 (18-21, 21-10, 21-12)	Liu / Li (CHN); W 2–0 (21-14, 22-20)	Yang QX / Xiao (CHN); W 2–0 (23-21, 21-17)	1 Q	—N/a	Cheng / Huang (CHN); W 2–0 (21-19, 21-14)	Yang QX / Xiao (CHN); W 2–0 (21-16, 21-13)	1st place, gold medalist(s)
Nitesh Kumar; Thulasimathi Murugesan	Mixed SL3-SU5	Teamarrom / Srinavakul (THA); W 2–0 (21-9, 21-7)	Chen / Huang (CHN); W 2–0 (21-4, 21-18)	—N/a	1 Q	—N/a	Li / Xiao (CHN); W 2–1 (21-19, 14-21, 21-17)	Ramdani / Oktila (INA); L 1–2 (21-11, 19-21, 14-21)	2nd place, silver medalist(s)
Pramod Bhagat; Manisha Ramadass	Mixed SL3-SU5	Xiong / Li (CHN); W 2–1 (21-16, 19-21, 21-16)	Ramdani / Oktila (INA); L 0–2 (19-21, 16-21)	—N/a	2 Q	Teamarrom / Srinavakul (THA); W 2–0 (21-15, 21-14)	Ramdani / Oktila (INA); L 1–2 (21-16, 13-21, 17-21)	—N/a	3rd place, bronze medalist(s)
Ruthick Ragupathi; Manasi Joshi	Mixed SL3-SU5	Setiawan / Sadiyah (INA); L 0–2 (15-21, 4-21)	Li / Xiao (CHN); L 0–2 (10-21, 17-21)	Urbano / Pedrosa (PHI); W 2–0 (21-5, 21-15)	3	Did not advance			
Krishna Nagar; Sivarajan Solaimalai	Men's SH6	Chu / Wong (HKG); L 1–2 (21-12, 10-21, 12-21)	Aji / Subhan (INA); W 2–0 (22-20, 21-18)	Lin NL / Zeng (CHN); L 0–2 (6-21, 8-21)	—N/a				2nd place, silver medalist(s)
Krishna Nagar; Nithya Sre Sivan	Mixed SH6	Azmi / Mohamad (MAS); W 2–0 (21-7, 21-7)	Lin NL / Li FM (CHN); L 0–2 (6-21, 10-21)	Wu / Lin J-s (TPE); W 2–0 (21-15, 21-19)	2 Q	—N/a	Subhan / Marlina (INA); L 0–2 (14-21, 18-21)	—N/a	3rd place, bronze medalist(s)

== Boccia ==
Athlete	Event	Group stage					Semifinals	Final / BM	
Athlete	Event	Opposition Score	Opposition Score	Opposition Score	Opposition Score	Rank	Opposition Score	Opposition Score	Rank
Sachin Chamaria	Men's Individual BC3	Ahmad (UAE); W 8–4	Takahashi (JPN); L 1–5	Jeong (KOR); L 1–7	—N/a	3	Did not advance		
Anjali Devi	Women's Individual BC3	Sakai (JPN); W 9–0	Choi (KOR); L 0–8	Nurulasyiqah (SGP); W 3–2	Yang (CHN); W 5–3	1 Q	Kla-han (THA); L 3–5	Yang (CHN); L 3–5	4
Sachin Chamaria; Anjali Devi	Mixed Pairs BC3	Singapore; L 2–5	Hong Kong; L 1–8	Chinese Taipei; W 11–1	—N/a	3	Did not advance		

== Cycling ==
Athlete	Event	Qualifying round		Final	
Athlete	Event	Timing	Rank	Timing	Rank
Arshad Shaik	Men's C1-3 1000 m	1:19.762	9	Did not advance	
Arshad Shaik	Men's C1-2 3000 m	4:22.755	9	Did not advance	
Arshad Shaik	Men's C1-5 Time Trial	—N/a		DNF	
Arshad Shaik	Men's C1-3 Road Race	—N/a		DNS	

== Football 5-a-side ==
Summary

Team	Event	Group stage						Final / BM	
Team	Event	Opposition Score	Opposition Score	Opposition Score	Opposition Score	Opposition Score	Rank	Opposition Score	Rank
India men's	Men's tournament	South Korea; L 0–2	Japan; L 1–6	Thailand; L 0–3	Iran; L 0–5	China; L 0-4	6	Did not advance	

Squad

- Boje Marbom
- Klingson Marak
- Pradeep Patel
- Sahil
- Shivam Negi
- Sovendra Singh
- Tushar Kumar
- Vishnubha Vaghela

Group stage

Team	Pld	W	D	L	GF	GA	GD	Pts	Qualification
China	5	4	0	1	10	3	+7	12	Gold medal match
Japan	5	4	0	1	10	3	+7	12	Gold medal match
Iran	5	3	0	2	11	4	+7	9	Bronze medal match
Thailand	5	3	0	2	6	3	+3	9	Bronze medal match
South Korea	5	1	0	4	3	8	−5	3	
India	5	0	0	5	1	20	−19	0	

Source: Asian Para Games 2026
16 October 2026
12:30 UTC+9

India	0–2	South Korea
	Report

Tsuruma Park Multipurpose Ground, Nagoya

17 October 2026
10:00 UTC+9

Japan	6–1	India
	Report

Tsuruma Park Multipurpose Ground, Nagoya

19 October 2026
12:30 UTC+9

India	0–3	Thailand
	Report

Tsuruma Park Multipurpose Ground, Nagoya

20 October 2026
15:00 UTC+9

India	0–5	Iran
	Report

Tsuruma Park Multipurpose Ground, Nagoya

21 October 2026
15:00 UTC+9

China	4–0	India
	Report

Tsuruma Park Multipurpose Ground, Nagoya

== Judo ==
Men

Athlete	Event	Group Stage					Quarterfinal	Semifinal	Repechage	Final / BM	
Athlete	Event	Opposition Result	Opposition Result	Opposition Result	Opposition Result	Rank	Opposition Result	Opposition Result	Opposition Result	Opposition Result	Rank
Kapil Parmar	J1 −70 kg	—N/a					Baatarsuren (MGL); W 110–010^{IPP}	Junaedi (INA); L 000–100^{IPP}	—N/a	Shidqi (INA); W 100–000^{IPP}	3rd place, bronze medalist(s)
Bijender	J2 −95 kg	Karomatov (UZB); L 000–100^{IPP}	Nurkabayev (KAZ); L 000–100^{IPP}	Amanzhol (KAZ); L 000–100^{IPP}	Tanaka (JPN); L 000–101^{IPP}	—N/a					5

Women

Athlete	Event	Group Stage					Quarterfinal	Semifinal	Repechage	Final / BM	
Athlete	Event	Opposition Result	Opposition Result	Opposition Result	Opposition Result	Rank	Opposition Result	Opposition Result	Opposition Result	Opposition Result	Rank
Renuka Salave	J1 −70 kg	—N/a					Nishimura (JPN); L 000–100^{IPP}	—N/a	Kujulova (KAZ); L 000–100^{IPP}	Did not advance	
Kokila Kaushiklate	J2 −52 kg	—N/a						Liu (CHN); W 011–010^{YUK}	—N/a	Ulanbek Kyzy (KGZ); L 000–100^{IPP}	2nd place, silver medalist(s)
Gulshan Naaz	J2 −70 kg	—N/a					Lin (CHN); L 000–100^{IPP}	—N/a	Kudaiberdieva (KGZ); W 100–00^{IPP}	Mereke (KAZ); L 000–100^{IPP}	5
Vrushali More	J2 −70 kg	—N/a					Wang (CHN); L 000–100^{IPP}	—N/a		Lin (CHN); L 000–100^{IPP}	5
Dimple	J2 70+ kg	Djuraeva (UZB); L 000–100^{IPP}	Raifova (KAZ); L 000–101^{IPP}	Wang (CHN); L 000–100^{IPP}	Parmonova (UZB); L 000–100^{IPP}	—N/a					5

== Powerlifting ==
Men

Athlete	Event	Attempt 1	Attempt 2	Attempt 3	Total	Rank
Manish Kumar	59 kg	176	181	~~182~~	181	4
Paramjeet Kumar	59 kg	167	~~172~~	~~174~~	167	7
Ashok Malik	65 kg	187	192	~~201~~	192	2nd place, silver medalist(s)
Jhandu Kumar	72 kg	190	~~195~~	~~195~~	190	5

Women

Athlete	Event	Attempt 1	Attempt 2	Attempt 3	Total	Rank
Jaspreet Kaur	45 kg	100	~~102~~	~~102~~	100	4
Suman Devi	61 kg	95	~~101~~	101	101	6
Seema Rani	61 kg	96	~~99~~	~~100~~	96	7
Kasthuri Rajamani	67 kg	103	~~106~~	108	108	2nd place, silver medalist(s)

Team

Athlete	Event	Heats					Final	Rank
Athlete	Event	Attempt 1	Attempt 2	Attempt 3	Total	Rank	Final	Rank
Jaspreet Kaur; Kasthuri Rajamani; Suman Devi	Women	95	95	100	260.25	7	Did not advance	

== Shooting ==
The Paralympic Committee of India announced a 13-member squad for the Games in June 2026.

Men

Athlete	Event	Qualification		Final	
Athlete	Event	Score	Rank	Score	Rank
Manish Narwal	P1 10m Air Pistol SH1	570	5 Q	233.7	2nd place, silver medalist(s)
Nihal Singh	P1 10m Air Pistol SH1	560	12	Did not advance	
Rudransh Khandelwal	P1 10m Air Pistol SH1	571	2 Q	127.3	7
Anandha Krishnan	R1 10m Air Rifle SH1	605.2	13	Did not advance	
Rakesh Nidagundi	R1 10m Air Rifle SH1	619.3	7 Q	141.5	7
Swaroop Unhalkar	R1 10m Air Rifle SH1	617.4	8 Q	205.9	4

Women

Athlete	Event	Qualification		Final	
Athlete	Event	Score	Rank	Score	Rank
Bhakti Sharma	P2 10m Air Pistol SH1	559	9	Did not advance	
Rubina Francis	P2 10m Air Pistol SH1	558	10	Did not advance	
Shrishti Arora	P2 10m Air Pistol SH1	560	5 Q	214.7	3rd place, bronze medalist(s)
Sumedha Pathak	P2 10m Air Pistol SH1	561	1 Q	111.4	8
Avani Lekhara	R2 10m Air Rifle SH1	626.4	2 Q	249.6	2nd place, silver medalist(s)
Mona Agarwal	R2 10m Air Rifle SH1	629.1 GR	1 Q	250.0 GR	1st place, gold medalist(s)
Avani Lekhara	R8 50m Rifle 3 positions SH1	580 GR	1 Q	333.2	4
Mona Agarwal	R8 50m Rifle 3 positions SH1	566	6 Q	357.5 WR	1st place, gold medalist(s)

Mixed

Athlete	Event	Qualification		Final	
Athlete	Event	Score	Rank	Score	Rank
Amir Ahmad Bhat	P3 25m Pistol SH1	567	5 Q	14	5
Nihal Singh	P3 25m Pistol SH1	573	4 Q	10	6
Rudransh Khandelwal	P4 50m Pistol SH1	512	9	Did not advance	

== Swimming ==
Men

Athlete	Event	Heat		Final	
Athlete	Event	Result	Rank	Result	Rank
Abdul Indori	50 m backstroke S5	39.87	5 Q	37.26	5
Gopichand Lingutla	100 m backstroke S7	1:25.32	6 Q	1:22.09	6
Tejas Nandakumar	100 m backstroke S7	1:19.84	4 Q	1:18.58	3rd place, bronze medalist(s)
Himanshu Nandal	100 m backstroke S11	—N/a		1:13.77	4
Ravi Budigina	100 m backstroke S13	—N/a		1:10.10	2nd place, silver medalist(s)
Rohit Kumar	100 m breaststroke SB4	1:58.43	3 Q	1:57.25	3rd place, bronze medalist(s)
Chaitanya Kulkarni	100 m breaststroke SB5	—N/a		2:07.44	6
Swatik Patil	100 m breaststroke SB9	1:18.77	3 Q	1:13.77	3rd place, bronze medalist(s)
Himanshu Nandal	100 m breaststroke SB11	1:21.52	4 Q	1:20.72	3rd place, bronze medalist(s)
Jahangir Molla	100 m breaststroke SB13	1:15.93	4 Q	1:15.96	8
Ravi Budigina	100 m breaststroke SB13	1:18.51	8 Q	1:14.43	6
Abdul Indori	50 m butterfly S5	40.88	7 Q	40.84	7
Niranjan Mukundan	50 m butterfly S7	—N/a		35.16	6
Suyash Jadhav	50 m butterfly S7	—N/a		32.81	5
Jahangir Molla	100 m butterfly S12	—N/a		1:17.01	5
Chaitanya Kulkarni	50 m freestyle S6	DNS		Did not advance	
Suyash Jadhav	50 m freestyle S7	—N/a		32.51	5
Tejas Nandakumar	50 m freestyle S7	—N/a		33.41	6
Ajay Bhosale	50 m freestyle S10	—N/a		27.27	6
Himanshu Nandal	50 m freestyle S11	28.68	4 Q	28.86	6
Ravi Budigina	50 m freestyle S13	26.47	4 Q	25.89	3rd place, bronze medalist(s)
Chaitanya Kulkarni	100 m freestyle S6	1:14.57	5 Q	1:12.35	5
Ajay Bhosale	100 m freestyle S10	—N/a		1:01.92	6
Kapil Kumar	100 m freestyle S10	—N/a		59.69	4
Himanshu Nandal	100 m freestyle S11	—N/a		1:05.90	3rd place, bronze medalist(s)
Ravi Budigina	100 m freestyle S13	—N/a		56.68	2nd place, silver medalist(s)
Chaitanya Kulkarni	400 m freestyle S6	5:42.02	4 Q	5:30.57	4
Gopichand Lingutla	400 m freestyle S7	—N/a		5:40.44	5
Niranjan Mukundan	400 m freestyle S7	—N/a		5:38.77	4
Kapil Kumar	400 m freestyle S10	—N/a		4:38.44	2nd place, silver medalist(s)
Himanshu Nandal	400 m freestyle S11	—N/a		5:10.91	3rd place, bronze medalist(s)
Ravi Budigina	400 m freestyle S13	—N/a		5:41.70	6
Niranjan Mukundan	200 m individual medley SM7	—N/a		2:57.01	3rd place, bronze medalist(s)
Suyash Jadhav	200 m individual medley SM7	—N/a		3:03.40	5
Swatik Patil	200 m individual medley SM9	2:33.77	6 Q	2:31.28	6
Himanshu Nandal	200 m individual medley SM11	—N/a		2:39.63	4
Ravi Budigina	200 m individual medley SM13	—N/a		2:26.37	6

Women

Athlete	Event	Heat		Final	
Athlete	Event	Result	Rank	Result	Rank
Devanshi Satija	100 m backstroke S10	—N/a		1:35.89	5
Devanshi Satija	100 m butterfly S10	—N/a		1:34.00	6
Vaishnavi Jagtap	50 m freestyle S8	40.22	7 Q	40.13	7
Devanshi Satija	50 m freestyle S10	—N/a		32.82	5
Vaishnavi Jagtap	100 m freestyle S8	—N/a		1:23.69	6
Vaishnavi Jagtap	400 m freestyle S8	—N/a		6:22.72	6

== Table Tennis ==
Singles

Player	Event	Group stage					Quarter-finals	Semi-finals	Final	
Player	Event	Opposition Score	Opposition Score	Opposition Score	Opposition Score	Rank	Opposition Score	Opposition Score	Opposition Score	Rank
Jehan Madan	Men's C1	Dangi (IND); W 3–1	Alsalmi (KSA); L 1–3	Nurmagambetov (KAZ); L 2–3	Kim H-u (KOR); L 0–3	—N/a				3rd place, bronze medalist(s)
Sandeep Dangi	Men's C1	Madan (IND); L 1–3	Kim (KOR); L 0–3	Alsalmi (KSA); L 0–3	Nurmagambetov (KAZ); L 0–3	—N/a				5
Shubham Wadhwa	Men's C3	Thapa (NEP); W 3–0	Alhassan (KSA); L 0–3	—N/a		2 Q	Feng (CHN); L 0–3	Did not advance		
Dattaprasad Chougule	Men's C9	Iwabuchi (JPN); L 0–3	Surtubayev (KAZ); L 0–3	—N/a		3	Did not advance			
Ekta Bhyan	Women's C1	Almyrisl (KSA); L 0–3	Kim E-h (KOR); L 0–3	Mao (CHN); L 0–3	—N/a					4
Sonalben Patel	Women's C3	Ikeyama (JPN); W 3–0	Li (KOR); L 0–3	Chao (TPE); W 3–0	—N/a	2 Q	Asayut (THA); W 3–1	Yoon (KOR); L 0–3	—N/a	3rd place, bronze medalist(s)
Bhavinaben Patel	Women's C4/5	Al-Rasheedi (KUW); W 3–0	Eleimat (JOR); W 3–0	—N/a		1 Q	Zhang M (CHN); W 3–1	Zhang B (CHN); L 0–3	—N/a	3rd place, bronze medalist(s)
Prachi Pandey	Women's C6	Liu (CHN); L 0–3	Phathumchai (THA); W 3–1	—N/a		2Q	—N/a	Al-Dayyeni (IRQ); L 0–3	—N/a	3rd place, bronze medalist(s)
Savita Ajjanakatti	Women's C8	Huang (CHN); L 0–3	Kurashimo (JPN); L 1–3	—N/a		3	Did not advance			
Baby Sahana Ravi	Women's C9	Nguyễn (VIE); W 3–0	Xiong (CHN); L 0–3	Yerzhankyzy (KAZ); W 3–0	—N/a	2Q	—N/a	Mao (CHN); L 0–3	—N/a	3rd place, bronze medalist(s)

Doubles

Pair	Event	Group stage					Quarter-final	Semi-final	Final	
Pair	Event	Opposition Score	Opposition Score	Opposition Score	Opposition Score	Rank	Opposition Score	Opposition Score	Opposition Score	Rank
Jehan Madan; Shubham Wadhwa	Men's C4	Alsalmi / Alhassan (KSA); W 3–1	Chueawong / Thinathet (THA); L 0–3	Kim H-u / Jang (KOR); L 1–3	Park / Kim K-h (KOR); L 0–3	Did not advance				3rd place, bronze medalist(s)
Bhavinaben Patel; Ekta Bhyan	Women's C5	Seo / Yoon (KOR); L 0–3	Saensathan / Intanon (THA); L 0–3	—N/a		3	Did not advance			
Prachi Pandey; Savita Ajjanakatti	Women's C14	Huang / Liu (CHN); L 0–3	Phathumchai / Chaiwut (THA); L 1–3	—N/a		3	Did not advance			
Sandeep Dangi; Sonalben Patel	Mixed C4	Maryam / Alhasaan (KSA); L 0–3	Saensathan / Thinathet (THA); L 0–3	Kim H-u / Yoon (KOR); L 0–3	—N/a	4	Did not advance			
Shubham Wadhwa; Bhavinaben Patel	Mixed C7	Batuhan / Cartera (PHI); W 3–0	Gunaya / Muslim (INA); W 3–2	Alkhalaf / Alotaibi (KUW); W 3–0	—N/a	1 Q	Bessho / Uno (JPN); W 3–0	Jang / Lee (KOR); L 1–3	Did not advance	3rd place, bronze medalist(s)
Dattaprasad Chougule; Savita Ajjanakatti	Mixed C17	Pham / Nguyen (VIE); W 3–0	Park / Kim K-h (KOR); L 1–3	Al-Sarraji / Abualsebah (IRQ); W 3–0	—N/a	2 Q	Redulla / Manginsay (PHI); L 2–3	Did not advance		
