= Archery at the 2026 Asian Para Games – Compound mixed team =

Event at the 2026 Asian Para Games

Compound mixed team event at the 2026 Asian Para Games
- Venue: Okazaki Central Park Multipurpose Square, Okazaki
- Dates: 19 – 22 October 2026
- Competitors: 22 from 11 nations

Medalists
gold medal	Toman Kumar; Sheetal Devi	India
silver medal	Ken Swagumilang; Teodora Audi Ayudia Ferelly	Indonesia
bronze medal	Zhang Yicheng; Xu Xueqing	China

The compound mixed team event at the 2026 Asian Para Games was held from 19 to 22 October 2026 at the Okazaki Central Park Multipurpose Square in Okazaki. A total of 22 players competed in 11 pairs.

Toman Kumar and Sheetal Devi broke the qualification world record, scoring 1402 out of 1440 points. The Indian pair won the gold medal, while Indonesia's Ken Swagumilang and Teodora Audi Ayudia Ferelly won the silver medal. China's Zhang Yicheng and Xu Xueqing clinched the bronze.

== Records ==
The records were as follows:

Record	Score	Archer(s)	Location	Date
Qualification round
World record	1400	Rakesh Kumar (IND); Sheetal Devi (IND)	Ahmedabad, India	5 September 2026
Asian record	1400	Rakesh Kumar (IND); Sheetal Devi (IND)	Ahmedabad, India	5 September 2026
Games record	1382	Ai Xinliang (CHN); Lin Yueshan (CHN)	Hangzhou, China	22 October 2023
Elimination round
World record	158	Alberto Simonelli (ITA); Eleanora Sarti (ITA)	Beijing, China	13 September 2017
Asian record	157	Zhang Yicheng (CHN); Xu Xueqing (CHN)	Gwangju, South Korea	23 September 2025
Games record	155	Rakesh Kumar (IND); Sheetal Devi (IND)	Hangzhou, China	25 October 2023

== Results ==
=== Qualification round ===
The qualification round was held on 19 October 2026. The top five archers qualified directly for the quarter-finals, while the remaining six archers played in the round of 16.

Rank	Nation	Archers		Score	Xs	10s	Notes
Rank	Nation	Male	Female	Score	Xs	10s	Notes
1	India (IND)	Toman Kumar	Sheetal Devi	1402	56	53	WR
2	China (CHN)	Zhang Yicheng	Xu Xueqing	1388	48	48	
3	Indonesia (INA)	Ken Swagumilang	Teodora Audi Ayudia Ferelly	1370	30	52	
4	Chinese Taipei (TPE)	Yang Jyun-kai	Lee Yun-hsien	1356	27	51	
5	Philippines (PHI)	Marzel Burgos	Agustina Bantiloc	1341	33	33	
6	Thailand (THA)	Teerasak Phiarthanee	Phannibha Srathongmaew	1333	13	49	
7	Kazakhstan (KAZ)	Alexandr Medvedev	Aizada Seidan	1330	14	41	
8	Japan (JPN)	Yuya Oe	Aya Shinohara	1327	24	34	
9	Iraq (IRQ)	Abbas Kadhim	Sarah Al-Hameed	1325	17	41	
10	Malaysia (MAS)	Wiro Julin	Nur Jannaton Abdul Jalil	1293	20	22	
11	Hong Kong (HKG)	Ngai Ka Chuen	Chan Yuen Wah	1287	25	24	

=== Elimination round ===
Round of 16
9	Iraq (IRQ)	141
8	Japan (JPN)	152
11	Hong Kong (HKG)	140
6	Thailand (THA)	141
7	Kazakhstan (KAZ)	149
19	Malaysia (MAS)	146

Quarterfinals
1	India (IND)	154
8	Japan (JPN)	147
5	Philippines (PHI)	147
4	Chinese Taipei (TPE)	148
3	Indonesia (INA)	150
6	Thailand (THA)	147
7	Kazakhstan (KAZ)	147
2	China (CHN)	153

Semifinals
1	India (IND)	142
4	' Chinese Taipei (TPE)	141
3	Indonesia (INA)	150
2	China (CHN)	142

Finals
1	India (IND)	151
3	Indonesia (INA)	148
Bronze medal match
4	Chinese Taipei (TPE)	138
2	China (CHN)	151
