= Badminton at the 2026 Asian Para Games – Men's doubles SL3–SU5 =

Mixed Doubles SL3–SU5 event at the 2026 Asian Para Games
- Venue: Ichinomiya City Municipal Gymnasium, Ichinomiya
- Dates: 16 – 23 October 2026
- Competitors: 24 from 5 nations

Medalists
gold medal	Suryo Nugroho; Muhammad Al Imran	Indonesia
silver medal	Shin Kyung-hwan; Cho Na-dan	South Korea
bronze medal	Li Mingpan; Xiong Lichuan	China
bronze medal	Naveen Sivakumar; Surya Kant Yadav	India

The men's doubles SL3–SU5 event at the 2026 Asian Para Games was played from 16 to 23 October 2026 in Ichinomiya City Municipal Gymnasium, Ichinomiya. A total of 24 players competed in 12 pairs.

Suryo Nugroho and Muhammad Al Imran defeated Shin Kyung-hwan and Cho Na-dan in the final to clinch the gold medal. Li Mingpan and Xiong Lichuan, alongside Naveen Sivakumar and Surya Kant Yadav shared the bronze medals each.

== Schedule ==
GS	Group stage	¼	Quarterfinals	½	Semifinals	F	Final

Fri 16	Sat 17	Sun 18	Mon 19	Tue 20	Wed 21	Thu 22	Fri 23
GS	GS	—N/a	GS	—N/a	¼	½	F

== Seeds ==
The following players were seeded:

1. Fredy Setiawan / Hikmat Ramdani (INA) (quarter-finals)
2. Naveen Sivakumar / Surya Kant Yadav (IND) (bronze medallist)
3. Nitesh Kumar / Ruthick Ragupathi (IND) (quarter-finals)
4. Pramod Bhagat / Sukant Kadam (IND) (group stage)

== Group stage ==
=== Group A ===
Pos	Team	Pld	W	L	GF	GA	GD	PF	PA	PD	Qualification
1	Fredy Setiawan (INA) Hikmat Ramdani (INA) [1]	2	2	0	4	0	+4	84	44	+40	Quarter-finals
2	Yi Yuzhe (CHN) Chen Pengfei (CHN)	2	1	1	2	2	0	63	78	−15	Quarter-finals
3	Umesh Kumar (IND) Rakesh Pandey (IND)	2	0	2	0	4	−4	60	85	−25	

Source: Asian Para Games

Date	Player 1	Score	Player 2	Game 1	Game 2	Game 3	Report
16 Oct	Umesh Kumar (India); Rakesh Pandey (India)	0–2	(China) Yi Yuzhe (China) Chen Pengfei	20–22	16–21		[ Report]
17 Oct	Fredy Setiawan (Indonesia); Hikmat Ramdani (Indonesia)	2–0	(India) Umesh Kumar (India) Rakesh Pandey	21–14	21–10		[ Report]
19 Oct	Fredy Setiawan (Indonesia); Hikmat Ramdani (Indonesia)	2–0	(China) Yi Yuzhe (China) Chen Pengfei	21–10	21–10		[ Report]

=== Group B ===
Pos	Team	Pld	W	L	GF	GA	GD	PF	PA	PD	Qualification
1	Naveen Sivakumar (IND) Surya Kant Yadav (IND) [2]	2	2	0	4	0	+4	84	60	+24	Quarter-finals
2	Li Mingpan (CHN) Xiong Lichuan (CHN)	2	1	1	2	2	0	68	67	+1	Quarter-finals
3	Mohammad Ali Imam (BAN) Joytu Dhar (BAN)	2	0	2	0	4	−4	59	84	−25	

Source: Asian Para Games

Date	Player 1	Score	Player 2	Game 1	Game 2	Game 3	Report
16 Oct	Li Mingpan (China); Xiong Lichuan (China)	2–0	(Bangladesh) Mohammad Ali Imam (Bangladesh) Joytu Dhar	21–11	21–14		[ Report]
17 Oct	Naveen Sivakumar (India); Surya Kant Yadav (India)	2–0	(China) Li Mingpan (China) Xiong Lichuan	21–7	21–19		[ Report]
19 Oct	Naveen Sivakumar (India); Surya Kant Yadav (India)	2–0	(Bangladesh) Mohammad Ali Imam (Bangladesh) Joytu Dhar	21–17	21–17		[ Report]

=== Group C ===
Pos	Team	Pld	W	L	GF	GA	GD	PF	PA	PD	Qualification
1	Lee Seung-hu (KOR) Lee Jeong-soo (KOR)	2	2	0	4	2	+2	117	105	+12	Quarter-finals
2	Nitesh Kumar (IND) Ruthick Ragupathi (IND) [3/4]	2	1	1	3	2	+1	96	80	+16	Quarter-finals
3	Suhas Yathiraj (IND) Abhijeet Sakhuja (IND)	2	0	2	1	4	−3	78	106	−28	

Source: Asian Para Games

Date	Player 1	Score	Player 2	Game 1	Game 2	Game 3	Report
16 Oct	Lee Seung-hu (South Korea); Lee Jeong-soo (South Korea)	2–1	(India) Suhas Yathiraj (India) Abhijeet Sakhuja	21–15	22–24	21–12	[ Report]
17 Oct	Nitesh Kumar (India); Ruthick Ragupathi (India)	1–2	(South Korea) Lee Seung-hu (South Korea) Lee Jeong-soo	19–21	21–11	14–21	[ Report]
19 Oct	Nitesh Kumar (India); Ruthick Ragupathi (India)	2–0	(India) Suhas Yathiraj (India) Abhijeet Sakhuja	21–15	21–12		[ Report]

=== Group D ===
Pos	Team	Pld	W	L	GF	GA	GD	PF	PA	PD	Qualification
1	Suryo Nugroho (INA) Muhammad Al Imran (INA)	2	2	0	4	2	+2	84	57	+27	Quarter-finals
2	Shin Kyung-hwan (KOR) Cho Na-dan (KOR)	2	1	1	3	2	+1	81	93	−12	Quarter-finals
3	Pramod Bhagat (IND) Sukant Kadam (IND) [3/4]	2	0	2	1	4	−3	87	102	−15	

Source: Asian Para Games

Date	Player 1	Score	Player 2	Game 1	Game 2	Game 3	Report
16 Oct	Shin Kyung-hwan (South Korea); Cho Na-dan (South Korea)	0–2	(Indonesia) Suryo Nugroho (Indonesia) Muhammad Al Imran	10–21	11–21		[ Report]
17 Oct	Pramod Bhagat (India); Sukant Kadam (India)	1–2	(South Korea) Shin Kyung-hwan (South Korea) Cho Na-dan	21–18	19–21	11–21	[ Report]
19 Oct	Pramod Bhagat (India); Sukant Kadam (India)	0–2	(Indonesia) Suryo Nugroho (Indonesia) Muhammad Al Imran	18–21	18–21		[ Report]

== Knockout stage ==
Quarter-finals
1	Fredy Setiawan (IND); Hikmat Ramdani (IND)	21	21
Li Mingpan (CHN); Xiong Lichuan (CHN)	8	8
Lee Seung-hu (KOR); Lee Jeong-soo (KOR)	17	20
Shin Kyung-hwan (KOR); Cho Na-dan (KOR)	21	22
Yi Yuzhe (CHN); Chen Pengfei (CHN)	14	10
Suryo Nugroho (INA); Muhammad Al Imran (INA)	21
3/4	Nitesh Kumar (IND); Ruthick Ragupathi (IND)	12	10
2	Naveen Sivakumar (IND); Surya Kant Yadav (IND)	21	21

Semi-finals
Li Mingpan (CHN); Xiong Lichuan (CHN)	21	17
Shin Kyung-hwan (KOR); Cho Na-dan (KOR)	23	21
Suryo Nugroho (INA); Muhammad Al Imran (INA)	21	19	21
2	Naveen Sivakumar (IND); Surya Kant Yadav (IND)	8	21	16

Final
Shin Kyung-hwan (KOR); Cho Na-dan (KOR)	23	8
Suryo Nugroho (INA); Muhammad Al Imran (INA)	25	21
