= Anjanaben Bumbadiya =

Indian para-athlete (born 2001)

Anjanaben Bumbadiya (born 2001) is an Indian para-athlete from Gujarat. She competes in the women's 400 m T47 event. She represented India in the 2026 Asian Para Games at Aichi Nagoya, Japan, and won the gold medal in the 400m T47 event followed by a silver medal by teammate Jayanti Behera.

== Early life ==
Bumbadiya is from Gujarat. She has a congenital upper-limb impairment, with one arm shorter than normal and takes part in the T47 category that covers athletes with a below-elbow amputation, wrist amputation, or similar upper-limb deficiency or impairment affecting one arm.

== Career ==
Bumbadiya won the gold in the 2026 Asian Para Games clocking 59.97sec and was the only runner to go under a minute in the four-athlete race. In 2025, she became the Khelo India Para Games champion. She clocked her personal best of 1:00.04 and finished fourth at the 2025 World Para Athletics Championships in New Delhi.
