= Sri Lanka at the 2026 Asian Para Games =

- Sri Lankan flag
- IPC code: SRI
- NPC: National Federation of Sports for the Disabled

in Aichi-Nagoya, Japan 18 October 2026 – 24 October 2026
- Competitors: 22 (18 men and 4 women) in 6 sports
- Flag bearer (closing): TBD
- Medals Ranked 16th: Gold 2 Silver 4 Bronze 3 Total 9

Asian Para Games appearances (overview)
- 2010; 2014; 2018; 2022; 2026

Sri Lanka will participate in the 2026 Asian Para Games, to be held in Nagoya, Aichi Prefecture, Japan, from 18 to 24 October 2026. This will be Sri Lanka's fifth appearance at the Games.

== Medalists ==
Medal	Athlete	Sport	Event	Date
(gold) Gold	Pradeep Somasiri	Athletics	Men's 1500m (T46)	23 October
(gold) Gold	Dhananjana Wickramasingha	Athletics	Women's Long Jump (T47)	23 October
(silver) Silver	Dhananjana Wickramasingha	Athletics	Women's 200m (T47)	20 October
(silver) Silver	Galina Basnayake	Swimming	Women's 400m Freestyle (S9)	21 October
(silver) Silver	Palitha Bandara	Athletics	Men's Shot Put (F42/F61/F63)	22 October
(silver) Silver	Nuwan Indika Gamage	Athletics	Men's 100m (T44)	23 October
(bronze) Bronze	Mohammadu Safran	Athletics	Men's Long Jump (T47)	19 October
(bronze) Bronze	Naveed Raheem	Swimming	Men's 100m Butterfly (S9)	22 October
(bronze) Bronze	Saman Subasinghe	Athletics	Men's 400m (T47)	22 October

=== Summary ===
Medals by events
Sport	Gold	Silver	Bronze	Total
Athletics	2	3	2	7
Swimming	0	1	1	2
Total	2	4	3	9

Medals by day
Day	Date	Gold	Silver	Bronze	Total
1	19 October	0	0	1	1
2	20 October	0	1	0	1
3	21 October	0	1	0	1
4	22 October	0	1	2	3
5	23 October	2	1	0	3
Total		2	4	3	9

Medals by gender
Gender	Gold	Silver	Bronze	Total
Female	1	2	0	3
Male	1	2	3	6
Mixed	0	0	0	0
Total	2	4	3	9

Multiple medalists
Athlete	Event	1st place, gold medalist(s)	2nd place, silver medalist(s)	3rd place, bronze medalist(s)	Total
Dhananjana Wickramasingha	Athletics	1	1	0	2

== Competitors ==
Following is the list of sports and number of athletes that will participate in the upcoming edition:

Sport	Men	Women	Total
Athletics	12	2	14
Badminton	1	-	1
Shooting	-	1	1
Swimming	1	1	2
Table tennis	2	-	2
Wheelchair tennis	2	-	2
Total	18	4	22

== Athletics ==
Track events
Men

Athlete	Event	Class	Heat		Final	
Athlete	Event	Class	Result	Rank	Result	Rank
Nuwan Maththaka	100 m	T44				
Mohammadu Safran	100 m	T47	11.44	7q		
Saman Subasinghe	100 m	T47	11.60	11	Did not advance	
Salmaan Yoosoof	100 m	T47	11.77	12	Did not advance	
Charitha Indrapala	100 m	T63				
Pradeep Somasiri	400 m	T47				
Saman Subasinghe	400 m	T47				
Pradeep Somasiri	1500 m	T46				

Women

Athlete	Event	Class	Heat		Final	
Athlete	Event	Class	Result	Rank	Result	Rank
Dhananjana Wickramasingha	100 m	T47	21 Oct			
Sanduni Jayasundara	100 m	T47	21 Oct			
Dhananjana Wickramasingha	200 m	T47	26.19 PB	5Q	25.80 PB	2nd place, silver medalist(s)
Sanduni Jayasundara	200 m	T47	30.48	11	Did not advance	

Field events
Men

Athlete	Event	Class	Qualification		Final	
Athlete	Event	Class	Result	Rank	Result	Rank
Charitha Indrapala	Long Jump	T42/T61/T63	—N/a		21 Oct	
Mohammadu Safran	Long Jump	T47	—N/a		6.55	3rd place, bronze medalist(s)
Salmaan Yoosoof	Long Jump	T47	—N/a		6.40	4
Buddika Dangalla	Long Jump	T47	—N/a		6.11	5
Nuwan Maththaka	Long Jump	T44/T62/T64				
Maleesha Seemahewage	Shot Put	F40	—N/a		21 Oct	
Palitha Halgahawela	Shot Put	F42/F61/F63				
Pathum Abeyawardhanage	Shot Put	F56/F57	—N/a		20 Oct	
Pathum Abeyawardhanage	Discus Throw	F57	—N/a		35.68	6
Gamini Ketawala	Javelin throw	F46				
Samitha Kodithuwakku	Javelin throw	F42-F44/ F61-F64				

Women

Athlete	Event	Class	Qualification		Final	
Athlete	Event	Class	Result	Rank	Result	Rank
Sanduni Jayasundara	Long Jump	T47				
Dhananjana Wickramasingha	Long Jump	T47				

== Badminton ==
Singles

Athlete	Event	Group stage				Round of 16	Quarterfinals	Semifinals	Final	
Athlete	Event	Opposition Score	Opposition Score	Opposition Score	Rank	Opposition Score	Opposition Score	Opposition Score	Opposition Score	Rank
Sanjeewa Madduma	Men's SL4	Shin (KOR) L 0-2 (13-21, 19-21)	Kadam (IND) L 0-2 (11-21, 9-21)	Did not advance						

== Shooting ==
Women

Athlete	Event	Qualification		Final	
Athlete	Event	Score	Rank	Score	Rank
Neranjala Ranasingha	P2 10m Air Rifle SH1	DNS	Did not advance		

== Table Tennis ==
Singles

Player	Event	Group stage					Quarter-finals	Semi-finals	Final	
Player	Event	Opposition Score	Opposition Score	Opposition Score	Opposition Score	Rank	Opposition Score	Opposition Score	Opposition Score	Rank
Munidasa Walimunige	Men's C4-5	Siato (JPN) L 0–3	Gunaya (INA) L 0–3	—N/a			Did not advance			
Dinesh Pitiyage	Men's C9	Zhao (CHN) L 2–3	Ho (HKG) L 1–3	—N/a			Did not advance			

== Wheelchair Tennis ==
Singles

Player	Event	Group stage			Quarter-finals	Semi-finals	Final	
Player	Event	Opposition Score	Opposition Score	Rank	Opposition Score	Opposition Score	Opposition Score	Rank
Ranjan Dharmasenage	WT	—N/a	Dong (CHN) L (2–6, 2–6)	9	Did not advance			
Gamini Dissanayaka	WT	Hamedi (IRQ) W (7–5, 6–3)	Han (KOR) L (0–6, 4–6)	9	Did not advance			

Doubles

Player	Event	Group stage					Quarter-finals	Semi-finals	Final		
Player	Event	Opposition Score	Opposition Score	Opposition Score	Opposition Score	Rank	Opposition Score	Opposition Score	Opposition Score	Rank	
Ranjan Dharmasenage Gamini Dissanayaka	WT	—N/a					Benkhunthod / Wongcharoen (THA) L (2-6, 1-6)	Did not advance			5
