= Synaptic =

Synaptic may refer to:

- Synapse, part of the nervous system
- Synaptic (software), a Linux graphical package management program
- Synaptics, a semiconductor manufacturer
- Synaptics (EP), by Mouse on Mars, 2017

== See also ==
- Synapse (disambiguation)
- Synapsis, the pairing of two homologous chromosomes
