= Badminton at the 2026 Asian Para Games – Women's doubles SL3–SU5 =

Women's Doubles SL3–SU5 event at the 2026 Asian Para Games
- Venue: Ichinomiya City Municipal Gymnasium, Ichinomiya
- Dates: 16 – 23 October 2026
- Competitors: 16 from 4 nations

Medalists
gold medal	Manasi Joshi; Thulasimathi Murugesan	India
silver medal	Yang Qiuxia; Xiao Zuxian	China
bronze medal	Cheng Hefang; Huang Zixuan	China
bronze medal	Leani Ratri Oktila; Khalimatus Sadiyah	Indonesia

The women's doubles SL3–SU5 event at the 2026 Asian Para Games was played from 16 to 23 October 2026 in Ichinomiya City Municipal Gymnasium, Ichinomiya. A total of 16 players competed in 8 pairs.

Leani Ratri Oktila and Khalimatus Sadiyah were the defending champions but lost in the semis and shared the bronze medal with Cheng Hefang and Huang Zixuan. Manasi Joshi and Thulasimathi Murugesan defeated Yang Qiuxia and Xiao Zuxian in the final to clinch the gold medal.

== Schedule ==
GS	Group stage	½	Semifinals	F	Final

Fri 16	Sat 17	Sun 18	Mon 19	Tue 20	Wed 21	Thu 22	Fri 23
GS	GS	—N/a	GS	—N/a	½	—N/a	F

== Seeds ==
The following players were seeded:

1. Thulasimathi Murugesan / Manasi Joshi (IND) (gold medallist)
2. Leani Ratri Oktila / Khalimatus Sadiyah (INA) (bronze medallist)

== Group Stage ==
=== Group A ===
Pos	Team	Pld	W	L	GF	GA	GD	PF	PA	PD	Qualification
1	Thulasimathi Murugesan (IND) Manasi Joshi (IND) [1]	3	3	0	6	1	+5	147	115	+32	Semi-finals
2	Yang Qiuxia (CHN) Xiao Zuxian (CHN)	3	2	1	4	2	+2	122	82	+40	Semi-finals
3	Warining Rahayu (INA) Qonitah Ikhtiar Syakuroh (INA)	3	1	2	3	5	−2	118	163	−45	
4	Liu Yuemei (CHN) Li Tongtong (CHN)	3	0	3	1	6	−5	116	143	−27	

Source: Asian Para Games

Date	Player 1	Score	Player 2	Game 1	Game 2	Game 3	Report
16 Oct	Thulasimathi Murugesan (India); Manasi Joshi (India)	2–1	(Indonesia) Warining Rahayu (Indonesia) Qonitah Ikhtiar Syakuroh	18–21	21–10	21–12	Report
16 Oct	Liu Yuemei (China); Li Tongtong (China)	0–2	(China) Yang Qiuxia (China) Xiao Zuxian	12–21	9–21		Report
17 Oct	Thulasimathi Murugesan (India); Manasi Joshi (India)	2–0	(China) Liu Yuemei (China) Li Tongtong	21–14	22–20		Report
17 Oct	Yang Qiuxia (China); Xiao Zuxian (China)	2–0	(Indonesia) Warining Rahayu (Indonesia) Qonitah Ikhtiar Syakuroh	21–12	21–5		Report
19 Oct	Thulasimathi Murugesan (India); Manasi Joshi (India)	2–0	(China) Yang Qiuxia (China) Xiao Zuxian	23–21	21–17		Report
19 Oct	Liu Yuemei (China); Li Tongtong (China)	1–2	(Indonesia) Warining Rahayu (Indonesia) Qonitah Ikhtiar Syakuroh	19–21	21–14	21–23	Report

=== Group B ===
Pos	Team	Pld	W	L	GF	GA	GD	PF	PA	PD	Qualification
1	Leani Ratri Oktila (INA) Khalimatus Sadiyah (INA) [2]	3	3	0	6	0	+6	126	60	+66	Semi-finals
2	Cheng Hefang (CHN) Huang Zuxian (CHN)	3	2	1	4	2	+2	101	74	+27	Semi-finals
3	Mandeep Kaur (IND) Shanthiya Vishwanathan (IND)	3	1	2	2	4	−2	88	113	−25	
4	Wong Lai Ming (HKG) Zhang Tsz Huen (HKG)	3	0	3	0	6	−6	58	126	−68	

Source: Asian Para Games

Date	Player 1	Score	Player 2	Game 1	Game 2	Game 3	Report
16 Oct	Leani Ratri Oktila (Indonesia); Khalimatus Sadiyah (Indonesia)	2–0	(India) Mandeep Kaur (India) Shanthiya Vishwanathan	21–14	21–9		Report
16 Oct	Wong Lai Ming (Hong Kong); Zhang Tsz Huen (Hong Kong)	0–2	(China) Cheng Hefang (China) Huang Zuxian	5–21	4–21		Report
17 Oct	Leani Ratri Oktila (Indonesia); Khalimatus Sadiyah (Indonesia)	2–0	(Hong Kong) Wong Lai Ming (Hong Kong) Zhang Tsz Huen	21–9	21–11		Report
17 Oct	Cheng Hefang (China); Huang Zuxian (China)	2–0	(India) Mandeep Kaur (India) Shanthiya Vishwanathan	21–11	21–12		Report
19 Oct	Leani Ratri Oktila (Indonesia); Khalimatus Sadiyah (Indonesia)	2–0	(China) Cheng Hefang (China) Huang Zuxian	21–7	21–10		Report
19 Oct	Wong Lai Ming (Hong Kong); Zhang Tsz Huen (Hong Kong)	0–2	(India) Mandeep Kaur (India) Shanthiya Vishwanathan	15–21	14–21		Report

== Knockout stage ==
Semi-finals
1	Thulasimathi Murugesan (IND); Manasi Joshi (IND)	21	21
Cheng Hefang (CHN); Huang Zuxian (CHN)	19	14
Yang Qiuxia (CHN); Xiao Zuxian (CHN)	21	19	21
2	Leani Ratri Oktila (INA); Khalimatus Sadiyah (INA)	19	21	17

Final
1	Thulasimathi Murugesan (IND); Manasi Joshi (IND)	21	21
Yang Qiuxia (CHN); Xiao Zuxian (CHN)	16	13
