= Okazaki =

Okazaki may refer to:

- Okazaki (surname)
- Okazaki, Aichi, a city in Japan
- Okazaki Castle, a castle in Japan
- Okazaki fragments, DNA fragments formed during DNA replication (biology)

== See also ==
- Okasaki
