= Shubham Wadhwa =

Indian para table tennis player

Shubham Wadhwa (born 1997) is an Indian para-athlete and table tennis player from Punjab. He represented India at the 2026 Asian Para Games at Aichi Nagoya, Japan, and won two bronze medals in the table tennis mixed doubles XD7 along with Bhavinaben Patel and men's doubles MD4, partnering Jehan Madan.

== Early life ==
Wadhwa is from Ludhiana, Punjab.

== Career ==
Wadhwa won a bronze medal in the table tennis men's doubles MD4 class at the 2026 Asian Para Games on 22 October 2026. They lost 0-3 to South Korea's Park Jincheol and Kim Kyung-hyun in their final Group A match but won the bronze as they remained in the top four. Earlier, they defeated Saudi Arabia’s Rakan Alsalmi and Ibrahim Alhassan 3-1 in a Group A match on 21 October 2026. Later, on 23 October, he won the mixed doubles along with Bhavinaben Patel.

Earlier in 2026, he won a silver medal in mixed doubles and a bronze medal in men’s singles (Class 3) at the ITTF World Para Elite Taipei City. He is a ten time Indian National champion.
