= Manjeet Vyas =

Indian para-athlete

Manjeet Vyas (born 20 March 1992) is an Indian para-athlete who competes in men's javelin throw events in the F12/F13 categories. He represented India at the 2026 Asian Para Games, where he won the silver medal in the men's F13 class javelin throw event.

== Career ==
Vyas competed in the 2022 Asian Para Games, finishing fourth with a throw of 54.43 metres.

In early 2026, Vyas won the gold medal in the men’s F13 javelin throw at the World Para Athletics Grand Prix in New Delhi. Later, he also won a gold in the same class at the Indian Open Para Athletics Championships in bengaluru. In October 2026, he won the silver medal in the men's F13 javelin throw event at the 2026 Asian Para Games, throwing a personal best of 61.03 metres on his second attempt.
