= Prachi Pandey =

Indian para table tennis player

Prachi Pandey (born 15 January 1993) is an Indian parathlete and table tennis player from Unnao, Uttar Pradesh. She represented India at the 2026 Asian Para Games at Aichi Nagoya, Japan, where she won a bronze medal in the Women's Singles Class 6 event. With this achievement, she bacame the first Indian to win an Asian Para games medal in the women's singles Class 6 category. Her bronze medal, secured on her Asian Para Games debut, marked the first-ever Asian Para Games medal for Indian in the standing Para Table Tennis category.

== Early life and education ==
Pandey is from Uttar Pradesh. She completed her M.Tech. from Punjab Engineering College, Chandigarh. She has a neuro-degenerative condition. She trains at the Sports Authority of India's Centre of Excellence in Gandhinagar. She worked as a software developer from 2020 to 2023 but later devoted fulltime for the sport.

== Career ==
Pandey is a two time National champion having won the women's singles title at the National Para Table Tennis Championships in 2022 and 2023. In December 2023, she also won a gold in the inaugural Khelo India Para Games. She clinched another Khelo India Para Games gold in 2025.

She won her first International Table Tennis Federatiion medal at the 2023 Brazil Para Open. In 2026, she won the bronze medal in women's singles Class 6 at the World Para Future event at Nakhon Ratchasima, Thailand. She won a silver in the women's singles Class 6–7 at the World Para Future event at Gold Coast, Australia.

She was given the Best Para Athlete award by the Uttar Pradesh government in 2023.
