= Parveen (shot put thrower) =

Indian para athlete

Personal information
- Nationality: Indian
- Born: DOB 16-04-2004

Sport
- Country: India
- Sport: Para athletics
- Event: Shot put F46
Medal record
Men's para athletics
Representing India
Asian Para Games
Bronze medal – third place	2026 Aichi-Nagoya	Shot put F46

Parveen (born 16April2004) is an Indian track and field para-athlete who competes in the men's shotput throw F46 event. He represented India in the 2026 Asian Para Games at Aichi Nagoya, Japan, and won a bronze medal in the Shotput throw F46 event.

== Career ==
Parveen won the bronze medal at the 2026 Asian Para Games in the men's shotput throw F46 event with a season best throw 14.94 metres. It was a podium sweep for India in the F46 class. Parveen lost his hand in a fodder-cutting machine accident at the age of three. He began his sporting career in 2022. Initially, he started his training at a government school in his village, where he took his first steps towards athletics and began his journey of winning medals.
