= Shooting at the 2026 Asian Para Games – Women's 10m Air Rifle Standing SH1 =

Women's 10m Air Rifle Standing SH1 at the 2026 Asian Para Games
- Venue: Aichi Prefectural General Shooting Gallery, Aichi Prefecture
- Dates: 19 October 2026
- Competitors: 21 from 12 nations

Medalists
gold medal	Mona Agarwal	India
silver medal	Avani Lekhara	India
bronze medal	Lee Yun-ri	South Korea

The women's 10 metre air rifle standing SH1 event took place on 19 October 2026 at the Aichi Prefectural General Shooting Gallery in Aichi Prefecture, Japan, during the 2026 Asian Para Games. A total of 21 players participated.

Mona Agarwal clinched the gold medal, while Avani Lekhara won the silver medal, and Lee Yun-ri won the bronze medal respectively. Since Mona Agarwal is already qualified for the 2028 Summer Paralympics, Avani Lekhara secured another quota for India as the second-best shooter in this event.

== Records ==
The records are as follows:

Record	Time	Athlete (nation)	Location	Date
Qualification round
World record	629.4	Veronika Vadovičová (SVK)	Osijek, Croatia	2 October 2025
World record	629.4	Avani Lekhara (IND)	Changwon, South Korea	9 September 2026
Asian record	629.4	Avani Lekhara (IND)	Changwon, South Korea	9 September 2026
Games record	627.8	Zhang Cuiping (CHN)	Jakarta, Indonesia	7 October 2018
Final
World record	252.0	Iryna Shchetnik (UKR)	Rotterdam, Netherlands	18 August 2023
Asian record	250.8	Mona Agarwal (IND)	Changwon, South Korea	24 April 2024
Games record	249.6	Avani Lekhara (IND)	Hangzhou, China	22 October 2023

== Results ==
=== Qualification round ===
The top eight shooters who competed in the qualification round advanced to the final.

Rank	Shooter	NOC	1	2	3	4	5	6	Total	Notes
1	Mona Agarwal	India	105.3	105.5	103.1	105.0	105.6	104.6	629.1	Q, GR
2	Avani Lekhara	India	103.4	104.2	104.4	103.8	104.4	106.2	626.4	Q
3	Lee Yun-ri	South Korea	104.4	104.3	102.0	102.6	104.1	106.1	623.5	Q
4	Kim Mi-young	South Korea	103.8	103.9	104.5	103.2	104.8	103.3	623.5	Q
5	Anna Dovgelevich	Kazakhstan	103.6	103.6	102.8	103.3	103.7	103.6	620.6	Q
6	Aigerim Tulegenova	Kazakhstan	103.6	104.2	105.3	102.7	102.8	100.9	619.5	Q
7	Zhong Jie	China	102.5	104.0	104.4	101.3	103.9	102.9	619.0	Q
8	Wannipa Leungvilai	Thailand	103.0	101.9	102.7	104.4	104.5	101.6	618.1	Q
9	Rena Tsujio	Japan	103.6	102.7	102.9	101.1	103.6	103.9	617.8	
10	Xie Huanyu	China	102.3	102.5	103.2	103.0	102.6	103.8	617.4	
11	Mahsa Hajimohammadi	Iran	102.5	101.9	102.8	104.0	103.4	101.2	615.8	
12	Rohani	Indonesia	101.5	104.0	102.5	104.8	100.6	101.9	615.3	
13	Makhmudakhon Sobirova	Uzbekistan	101.7	102.2	101.8	103.3	103.1	103.0	615.1	
14	Perameswary Kashinathan	Malaysia	103.2	104.4	101.9	102.0	101.4	101.0	613.9	
15	Zhang Cuiping	China	99.8	103.7	102.1	102.8	101.1	102.7	612.2	
16	Kinley Dem	Bhutan	101.6	101.6	104.5	101.7	102.3	99.6	611.3	
17	Yun Ye-bin	South Korea	101.9	102.4	102.6	100.0	103.0	101.1	611.0	
18	Hayotkhon Ahmedova	Uzbekistan	100.8	100.9	101.3	103.2	102.5	101.9	610.6	
19	Zainab Ruwashed	Iraq	100.7	99.4	100.4	100.8	100.1	98.8	600.2	
20	Chutima Saenlar	Thailand	99.6	100.1	103.1	98.9	100.0	98.5	600.2	
21	Malika Kenjaeva	Uzbekistan	88.4	101.6	101.5	101.2	101.1	100.6	594.4	

=== Final ===
The final consisted of two phases: the first phase included two rounds of five shots each, followed by an elimination phase after every two shots.

Rank	Athlete	First stage		Second stage – Elimination							Notes
Rank	Athlete	5	10	12	14	16	18	20	22	24	Notes
1st place, gold medalist(s)	Mona Agarwal (IND)	51.0	102.9	123.7	144.7	165.7	187.1	207.9	228.8	250.0	GR
2nd place, silver medalist(s)	Avani Lekhara (IND)	53.2	104.8	126.4	146.8	167.2	186.9	208.0	228.5	249.6	
3rd place, bronze medalist(s)	Lee Yun-ri (KOR)	51.4	103.3	124.7	145.7	166.1	187.0	207.6	227.9	—N/a	
4	Aigerim Tulegenova (KAZ)	52.0	103.7	124.6	145.2	166.3	187.2	207.0	—N/a		
5	Kim Mi-young (KOR)	52.4	104.5	125.1	144.9	165.9	186.3	—N/a			
6	Zhong Jie (CHN)	50.9	103.0	123.7	144.7	165.4	—N/a				
7	Anna Dovgelevich (KAZ)	51.6	102.4	123.5	143.9	—N/a					
8	Wannipa Leungvilai (THA)	50.3	101.5	121.5	—N/a						
