= Devender Kumar (discus thrower) =

Indian para athlete

Devender Kumar (born 25 December 1999) is an Indian para athlete from Haryana who competes in the men's discus throw F43/44/62/64 events. He represented India in the 2026 Asian Para Games at Aichi Nagoya, Japan, and won a gold medal in the discus throw event where India swept all the three podium places.

== Early life ==
Kumar is from Kishkanda village, Charkhi Dadri district, Haryana.

== Career ==
At the 2026 Asian Para Games, Kumar won the gold medal in the F44/64 event with a throw of 49.71 metres on 20 October 2026. Rakesh Kumar and Pardeep Kumar completed an all-Indian podium winning silver and bronze behind Devender. He scored 781 Raza points for his first international gold medal.

In 2023, he won the gold medal at the 2022 Asian Para Games. In 2022, he also finished fifth at the Fazza World Para Athletics Grand Prix 2022. In 2025, he came sixth in the World Championships 2025. He won gold medals at the Indian Open in 2022, 2023, 2024 and 2025. In 2021 and 2026, he bagged the silver medals.
