= Badminton at the 2026 Asian Para Games – Men's doubles SH6 =

Men's doubles SH6 event at the 2026 Asian Para Games
- Venue: Ichinomiya City Municipal Gymnasium, Ichinomiya
- Dates: 16 – 21 October 2026
- Competitors: 8 from 4 nations

Medalists
gold medal	Lin Naili; Zeng Qingtao	China
silver medal	Krishna Nagar; Sivarajan Solaimalai	India
bronze medal	Subhan; Aji Dimas Tri	Indonesia

The men's doubles SH6 event at the 2026 Asian Para Games was played from 16 to 21 October 2026 in Ichinomiya City Municipal Gymnasium, Ichinomiya. A total of 8 players competed in 4 pairs in a round-robin format.

Lin Naili and Zeng Qingtao were the defending champions and successfully retained their title in this edition. Krishna Nagar and Sivarajan Solaimalai won the silver medal, while Subhan and Aji Dimas Tri won the bronze medal.

== Results ==
Pos	Team	Pld	W	L	GF	GA	GD	PF	PA	PD	Pts	Qualification
1	Lin Naili (CHN) Zeng Qingtao (CHN)	3	3	0	6	0	+6	126	67	+59	3	Gold medalist
2	Krishna Nagar (IND) Sivarajan Solaimalai (IND)	3	1	2	3	4	−1	100	134	−34	1	Silver medalist
3	Subhan (INA) Aji Dimas Tri (INA)	3	1	2	2	4	−2	111	119	−8	1	Bronze medalist
4	Chu Man Kai (HKG) Wong Chun Yim (HKG)	3	1	2	2	5	−3	110	127	−17	1	

Source: 2026 Asian Para Games

Date	Player 1	Score	Player 2	Game 1	Game 2	Game 3	Report
16 Oct	(Indonesia) Subhan (Indonesia) Aji Dimas Tri	0–2	(China) Lin Naili (China) Zeng Qingtao	15–21	16–21		Report
16 Oct	Krishna Nagar (India); Sivarajan Solaimalai (India)	1–2	(Hong Kong) Chu Man Kai (Hong Kong) Wong Chun Yim	21–12	10–21	12–21	Report
19 Oct	(Indonesia) Subhan (Indonesia) Aji Dimas Tri	0–2	(India) Krishna Nagar (India) Sivarajan Solaimalai	20–22	18–21		Report
19 Oct	(Hong Kong) Chu Man Kai (Hong Kong) Wong Chun Yim	0–2	(China) Lin Naili (China) Zeng Qingtao	11–21	11–21		Report
21 Oct	(Indonesia) Subhan (Indonesia) Aji Dimas Tri	2–0	(Hong Kong) Chu Man Kai (Hong Kong) Wong Chun Yim	21–17	21–17		Report
21 Oct	Krishna Nagar (India); Sivarajan Solaimalai (India)	0–2	(China) Lin Naili (China) Zeng Qingtao	6–21	8–21		Report
