= Shooting at the 2026 Asian Para Games – Women's 50m Rifle Three Positions SH1 =

Women's 50m Rifle Three Positions SH1 at the 2026 Asian Para Games
- Venue: Aichi Prefectural General Shooting Gallery, Aichi Prefecture
- Dates: 23 October 2026
- Competitors: 13 from 5 nations

Medalists
gold medal	Mona Agarwal	India
silver medal	Zhang Cuiping	China
bronze medal	Kim Mi-young	South Korea

The women's 50 metre rifle three positions SH1 event took place on 23 October 2026 at the Aichi Prefectural General Shooting Gallery in Aichi Prefecture, Japan, during the 2026 Asian Para Games. A total of 13 players participated.

Mona Agarwal won the gold medal, Zhang Cuiping won the silver medal, and Kim Mi-young won the bronze medal. Mona Agarwal has also set a World Record in the event with 357.5 points scored in the final.

== Records ==
The records are as follows:

Record	Time	Athlete (nation)	Location	Date
Qualification round
World record	586	Emilia Babska (POL)	Novi Sad, Serbia	25 July 2026
World record	586	Zhang Cuiping (CHN)	Novi Sad, Serbia	25 July 2026
Asian record	586	Zhang Cuiping (CHN)	Novi Sad, Serbia	25 July 2026
Final
World record	356.0	Anna Benson (SWE)	Novi Sad, Serbia	26 July 2026
Asian record	355.7	Lee Yun-ri (KOR)	Changwon, South Korea	12 September 2026

== Results ==
=== Qualification round ===
The top eight shooters who scored the most points during the qualification round advanced to the final.

Rank	Athlete	Nation	Kneeling		Prone		Standing		Total	Xs	Notes
Rank	Athlete	Nation	1	2	1	2	1	2	Total	Xs	Notes
1	Avani Lekhara	India (IND)	96	99	94	97	97	97	580	24	QGR, Q
2	Lee Yun-ri	South Korea (KOR)	94	97	96	98	98	96	579	23	Q
3	Wannipa Leungvilai	Thailand (THA)	97	98	99	94	98	96	579	22	Q
4	Zhang Cuiping	China (CHN)	98	96	97	95	97	93	576	26	Q
5	Kim Mi-young	South Korea (KOR)	97	95	94	94	97	94	571	19	Q
6	Mona Agarwal	India (IND)	95	97	94	96	91	93	566	17	Q
7	Makhmudakhon Sobirova	Uzbekistan (UZB)	91	96	98	97	87	95	564	20	Q
8	Xie Huanyu	China (CHN)	94	91	98	97	93	90	563	20	Q
9	Hayotkhon Ahmedova	Uzbekistan (UZB)	94	95	96	94	92	92	563	13	
10	Chutima Saenlar	Thailand (THA)	94	94	95	92	94	93	562	20	
11	Zhong Jie	China (CHN)	92	92	95	95	92	92	558	10	
12	Yun Ye-bin	South Korea (KOR)	90	93	97	96	91	89	556	15	
13	Chutima Arunmat	Thailand (THA)	93	96	95	100	82	87	553	17	

=== Final ===
Rank	Athlete	Kneeling	Prone	Standing – Elimination							Notes
Rank	Athlete	Kneeling	Prone	1	2	3	4	5	6	7	Notes
1st place, gold medalist(s)	(India) Mona Agarwal	101.4	203.5	256.5	307.3	317.7	328.0	338.1	347.7	357.5	WR
2nd place, silver medalist(s)	(China) Zhang Cuiping	102.1	205.6	253.8	304.6	313.9	324.3	334.7	344.8	353.7	
3rd place, bronze medalist(s)	(South Korea) Kim Mi-young	100.5	201.4	252.5	304.1	314.6	324.8	334.4	344.4	—N/a	
4	(India) Avani Lekhara	102.1	202.7	252.9	302.8	313.0	323.0	333.2	—N/a		
5	(Thailand) Wannipa Leungvilai	100.0	203.1	250.6	301.7	311.6	320.5	—N/a			
6	(China) Xie Huanyu	95.4	197.4	249.1	295.7	306.2	—N/a				
7	(Uzbekistan) Makhmudakhon Sobirova	94.8	194.3	241.7	291.0	—N/a					
8	(South Korea) Lee Yun-ri	102.3	203.3	240.7	288.9	—N/a					
