= Haney (para-athlete) =

Indian para-athlete (born 2006)

Haney (born 14 March 2006) an Indian para athlete from Haryana who competes in the men's discus throw F37 and javelin throw T37/38 events. He represented India in the 2026 Asian Para Games and won a gold and bronze medals in the javelin and discus throw events respectively.

== Early life ==
Haney was born in Goria village, Haryana on 14 March 2006. He has spasticity and weakness on the left side of his body. When he was 10, his father introduced him to sports but he left training as he could get a para-athlete certificate. In 2020, he started training under coach Sunil Phogat at Rohtak. Later, he was selected for the Target Olympic Podium Scheme (TOPS) of the Indian government.

== Career ==
Haney won the gold medal in the javelin throw at the 2026 Asian Para Games with a throw of 60.49m and set a new world record in the T37 category with a score of 1116 points in the final at the Nagoya City Mizuho Park Athletic Stadium on 23 October 2026. Earlier on 21 October 2026, he won a bronze with a personal best of 57.04 metres in his final attempt in the men's discus throw F37 event.

In 2021, he won his first gold at the Indian National Championships. In 2023, he won a gold in the F37 javelin throw at the 2022 Asian Para Games in Hangzhou, China. In 2025, he finished fourth in the discus throw event at the 2025 World Para Athletics Championships.
