= Adil Ansari (archer) =

Indian para-archer (born 1981)

Adil Mohamed Nazir Ansari (born 1981) is an Indian para-archer who competes in the recurve events. He represented India in the 2026 Asian Para Games at Aichi Nagoya, Japan, and finished third in the mixed W1 recurve event along with Swati Chaudhary.

The second-seeded Indian pair lost 2-6 (36-38, 33-35, 33-32, 31-35) to third seeds Kim Ok Geum and Park Hong Jo of Korea in the semifinals. The bronze medal match was not held as there were only three teams in the field.

== Career ==
Ansari won a bronze medal lin the 2022 Asian Para Games held in 2023 at Hangzhou, China. In 2026, he also won a team silver and team bronze medal in the World Para Series.
