= Okasaki =

Okasaki (written: 岡咲) is a Japanese surname. Notable people with the surname include:

- Chris Okasaki, American computer scientist
- Miho Okasaki (岡咲 美保, born 1998), Japanese voice actress

== See also ==
- 12439 Okasaki, a main-belt asteroid
- Okazaki (disambiguation)
