= Badminton at the 2026 Asian Para Games – Men's singles SL3 =

Men's singles SL3 event at the 2026 Asian Para Games
- Venue: Ichinomiya City Municipal Gymnasium, Ichinomiya
- Dates: 16 – 23 October 2026
- Competitors: 13 from 7 nations

Medalists
gold medal	Nitesh Kumar	India
silver medal	Pramod Bhagat	India
bronze medal	Muhammad Al-Imran	Indonesia
bronze medal	Lee Seung-hu	South Korea

The men's singles SL3 event at the 2026 Asian Para Games was played from 16 to 23 October 2026 in Ichinomiya City Municipal Gymnasium, Ichinomiya. A total of 13 players participated.

Pramod Bhagat was the defending champion but lost the final to the previous edition's runner-up and the reigning Paralympic champion, Nitesh Kumar. Muhammad Al-Imran and Lee Seung-hu won the bronze medals respectively.

== Schedule ==
GS	Group stage	¼	Quarterfinals	½	Semifinals	F	Final

Fri 16	Sat 17	Sun 18	Mon 19	Tue 20	Wed 21	Thu 22	Fri 23
GS	GS	—N/a	GS	¼	—N/a	½	F

== Seeds ==
The following players were seeded:

1. Nitesh Kumar (IND) (gold medallist)
2. Pramod Bhagat (IND) (silver medallist)
3. Umesh Kumar (IND) (quarter-finals)
4. Muhammad Al-Imran (INA) (bronze medallist)

== Group stage ==
=== Group A ===
Pos	Team	Pld	W	L	GF	GA	GD	PF	PA	PD	Qualification
1	Nitesh Kumar (IND) [1]	2	2	0	4	0	+4	84	41	+43	Quarter-finals
2	Nathhapol Chamnanwet (THA)	2	1	1	2	2	0	57	73	−16	Quarter-finals
3	Joo Dong-jae (KOR)	2	0	2	0	4	−4	59	86	−27	

Source: 2026 Asian Para Games

Date	Player 1	Score	Player 2	Game 1	Game 2	Game 3	Report
16 Oct	Nathhapol Chamnanwet (Thailand)	2–0	(South Korea) Joo Dong-jae	23–21	21–10		Report
17 Oct	Nitesh Kumar (India)	2–0	(Thailand) Nathhapol Chamnanwet	21–6	21–7		Report
19 Oct	Nitesh Kumar (India)	2–0	(South Korea) Joo Dong-jae	21–13	21–15		Report

=== Group B ===
Pos	Team	Pld	W	L	GF	GA	GD	PF	PA	PD	Qualification
1	Pramod Bhagat (IND) [2]	2	2	0	4	1	+3	100	81	+19	Quarter-finals
2	Lee Seung-hu (KOR)	2	1	1	3	2	+1	90	78	+12	Quarter-finals
3	Xiong Lichuan (CHN)	2	0	2	0	4	−4	53	84	−31	

Source: 2026 Asian Para Games

Date	Player 1	Score	Player 2	Game 1	Game 2	Game 3	Report
16 Oct	Xiong Lichuan (China)	0–2	(South Korea) Lee Seung-hu	10–21	10–21		Report
17 Oct	Pramod Bhagat (India)	2–0	(China) Xiong Lichuan	21–17	21–16		Report
19 Oct	Pramod Bhagat (India)	2–1	(South Korea) Lee Seung-hu	16–21	21–14	21–13	Report

=== Group C ===
Pos	Team	Pld	W	L	GF	GA	GD	PF	PA	PD	Qualification
1	Yi Yuzhe (CHN)	2	2	0	4	0	+4	84	32	+52	Quarter-finals
2	Umesh Kumar (IND) [3/4]	2	1	1	2	2	0	65	64	+1	Quarter-finals
3	Khian Kyle Urbano (PHI)	2	0	2	0	4	−4	31	84	−53	

Source: 2026 Asian Para Games

Date	Player 1	Score	Player 2	Game 1	Game 2	Game 3	Report
16 Oct	Khian Kyle Urbano (Philippines)	0–2	(China) Yi Yuzhe	1–21	8–21		Report
17 Oct	Umesh Kumar (India)	2–0	(Philippines) Khian Kyle Urbano	21–10	21–12		Report
19 Oct	Umesh Kumar (India)	0–2	(China) Yi Yuzhe	11–21	12–21		Report

=== Group D ===
Pos	Team	Pld	W	L	GF	GA	GD	PF	PA	PD	Qualification
1	Muhammad Al-Imran (INA) [3/4]	2	2	0	4	0	+4	84	64	+20	Quarter-finals
2	Daisuke Fujihara (JPN) [H]	2	1	1	2	3	−1	90	94	−4	Quarter-finals
3	Mongkhon Bunsun (THA)	2	0	2	1	4	−3	83	99	−16	
4	Yang Jianyuan (CHN)	0	0	0	0	0	0	0	0	0	Withdrew

Source: 2026 Asian Para Games

Date	Player 1	Score	Player 2	Game 1	Game 2	Game 3	Report
16 Oct	Muhammad Al-Imran (Indonesia)	2–0	(Thailand) Mongkhon Bunsun	21–14	21–17		Report
17 Oct	Muhammad Al-Imran (Indonesia)	2–0	(Japan) Daisuke Fujihara	21–18	21–15		Report
19 Oct	Daisuke Fujihara (Japan)	2–0	(Thailand) Mongkhon Bunsun	15–21	21–16	21–15	Report

== Knockout stage ==
Quarter-finals
1	Nitesh Kumar (IND)	21	21
3/4	Umesh Kumar (IND)	8	8
3/4	Muhammad Al-Imran (INA)	21	21
Nathhapol Chamnanwat (THA)	4	14
Lee Seung-hu (KOR)	21	21
Yi Yuzhe (CHN)	13	9
Daisuke Fujihara (JPN)	12	10
2	Pramod Bhagat (IND)	21	21

Semi-finals
1	Nitesh Kumar (IND)	21	21
3/4	Muhammad Al-Imran (INA)	19	16
Lee Seung-hu (KOR)	21	18	17
2	Pramod Bhagat (IND)	16	21	21

Final
1	Nitesh Kumar (IND)	21	21
2	Pramod Bhagat (IND)	18	16
