= Suvarna Raj =

Indian para athlete

Suvarna Raj (born 22 July 1982) is an Indian para athlete from Uttar Pradesh who competes in the women's discus throw F54 event. She represented India in the 2026 Asian Para Games at Aichi Nagoya, Japan, and won a gold medal in the discus throw event.

== Early life ==
Raj is from Nagpur, Maharashtra but settled in Greater Noida, Uttar Pradesh, after her marriage. She has been competing in para athletics since 2017 and represented India at three Asian Para Games. She trains under coach Pintu Nagar. Apart from sports, she works to improve accessibility for people with disabilities.

== Career ==
Raj won the gold at the 2026 Asian Para Games with a best throw of 15.66 metres in her fifth throw. She recorded four throws beyond the 15-metre mark. Raj's six attempts were 13.68m, 15.09m, 15.05m, 14.57m, 15.66m and 15.19m.

In 2026, she won a bronze medal at the Dubai World Para Athletics Grand Prix 2026, the 17th Fazza International Para Athletics Championship in the women's F54/55 discus throw event. In January 2026, she won a gold in the discus throw event and a silver in the shot put event at the Canberra track meet.
