= Banti (high jumper) =

Indian para athlete

Sport
- Country: India
- Sport: Para athletics
- Event: High jump T64
Medal record
Men's para athletics
Representing India
Asian Para Games
Silver medal – second place	2026 Aichi-Nagoya	High jump T64

Banti is an Indian para athlete who competes in the men's high jump T64 event. He represented India in the 2026 Asian Para Games and won a silver medal in the high jump behind teammate Praveen Kumar, who won a gold, thus making it a 1-2 podium finish for India.

== Career ==
Banti won a silver medal in the 2026 Asian Para Games in the high jump T64 event with a personal best of 1.92 metres.
