= Synaptics (EP) =

EP by Mouse on Mars
- Released: 13 October 2017
- Genre: IDM; footwork; dubstep; juke; electronica
- Length: 17:56
- Label: Monkeytown Records
- Producer: Jan St. Werner; Andi Toma

Mouse on Mars chronology
21 Again (2014)	Synaptics (2017)	Dimensional People (2018)

Synaptics is a limited edition EP by German electronica band Mouse on Mars. It was released on 13 October 2017 by Monkeytown Records in only 300 copies. It features experiments with juke and dubstep style and contributions from Jessy Lanza, Modeselektor and Sepalcure among others.

== Track listing ==
All tracks written and composed by Jan St. Werner and Andi Toma, except where noted:

No.	Title	Writer(s)	Remix	Length
1.	"Jack is Out"		Arson Only Edit	5:03
2.	"Blue Screen (feat. Jessy Lanza)"	Jan St. Werner, Andi Toma, Jeremy Greenspan, Jessica Lanza	Modeselektor Edit	4:17
3.	"Sensitive Person (feat. Sepalcure)"	Jan St. Werner, Andi Toma, Praveen Sharma, Travis Stewart		5:00

== Personnel ==
- Design – Frieda Luczak
- Vocals – Jessy Lanza (tracks: B1)
- Writing, production – Andi Toma (tracks: 1, 2, 3), Jan St. Werner (tracks: 1, 2, 3), Jeremy Greenspan (tracks: 2), Jessy Lanza (track 2), Praveen Sharma (track 3), Travis Stewart (track 3)
