= Rahul Saroha =

Indian para-athlete

Rahul Saroha is an Indian para athlete from Haryana who competes in the men's high jump T63 event. He represented India in the 2026 Asian Para Games and won a bronze medal in the high jump T63 event behind teammates, Shailesh Kumar who won the gold and Varun Bhati, who took the silver, to make it a podium sweep for India. It was a repeat of the podium sweep by India at the 2022 Asian Para Games at Hangzhou, China.

== Career ==
Saroha won the bronze medal in the men's high jump T63 class at the 2026 Asian Para Games on 22 October 2026 clearing a height of 1.81 metres at the Nagoya City Mizuho Park Athletic Stadium in Japan. The T63 classification is for athletes with an above-knee amputation or limb deficiency, who compete using a lower-limb prosthesis with a knee joint for running and jumping.

In 2025, he finished fourth in the men's high jump at the 2025 World Para Athletics Championships in New Delhi, with a personal best clearance of 1.78m.
