= Ayush Verma =

Indian para athlete

Ayush Verma (born 15 July 1991) is an Indian track and field para-athlete from Uttar Pradesh. He represented India in the men's shotput F53 and men's javelin throw F53/54 category at the 2026 Asian Para Games in Aichi Nagoya, Japan. He won a gold medal in the men's shot put F53 category and a bronze medal in the men's javelin throw F53/54.

== Early life ==
Verma is from Meerut, Uttar Pradesh. He took up shot put under coach Robin Kumar in 2020 and competes in seated throw events in para athletics. He competes in F53 category, which is for athletes with significant movement limitations in their trunk and legs.

== Career ==
Verma won the gold medal at the 2026 Asian Para Games in the men's shot ut F53 category, finishing ahead of throwers from Iran and Kazakhstan, on 21 October 2026. He began with an opening throw of 7.39 metres, and followed it up with throws of 7.42m, 7.50m and 7.92m in his next three attempts. His winning distance of 8.16 metres came in his fifth throw. He won a bronze medal in the men's javelin throw F53/54 class with a personal best throw of 17.88 metres, on 20 October 2026.
