= Swatik Patil =

Indian para swimmer

Personal information
- Born: 8 March 2002 (age 24) Bengaluru, Karnatka, India

Sport
- Country: India
- Sport: Para-swimming
- Disability class: SB4, SM9
Medal record
Men's swimming
Representing India
Asian Para Games
Bronze medal – third place	2026 Aichi-Nagoya	100 m breaststroke SB9
- Updated on 4 November 2026

Swatik Patil (born 8 March 2002) is an Indian para swimmer from Karnataka. He won a bronze medal in the men’s 100 m breaststroke SB9 event at the 2026 Asian Para Games in Aichi Nagoya, Japan.

== Early life ==
Patil is from Mutaga village, Belagavi district, Karnataka. He is the son of Narayan Patil and Changuna, is a graduate of NIT Allahabad and works as a software developer. He trains at KAHER’s Suvarna JNMC campus in Belagavi and Nettakallappa Swimming Centre in Bengaluru.

== Career ==
Patil won a bronze medal in the men's 100 m breaststroke SB9 race at the 2026 Asian Para Games clocking 1 minute 13.77 seconds behind Iran’s Sina Zeyghaminejad, who won the gold with a time of 1:09.47, and his teammate Shahin Izadyar who secured a silver in 1:13.23.
