= Kapil Kumar (swimmer) =

Indian para swimmer (born 2000)

Personal information
- Born: 2000 (age 25–26)

Sport
- Country: India
- Sport: Para-swimming
- Disability class: S10
Medal record
Men's swimming
Representing India
Asian Para Games
Silver medal – second place	2026 Aichi-Nagoya	400 m freestyle S10
- Updated on 4 November 2026

Kapil Kumar (born 19 October 2000) is an Indian para swimmer. He won a silver medal in the Men's 400 m freestyle S10 event at the 2026 Asian Para Games in Aichi Nagoya, Japan.

== Career ==
Kumar won the silver medal in the men's 400 m freestyle S10 event at the 2026 Asian Para Games clocking 4 minutes and 38.44 seconds behind Japan’s Akito Minai, who won the gold medal. in 4:27.44.
