= Sharath Shankarappa =

Indian para-athlete

Sharath Shankarappa Makanahalli is an Indian para-athlete from Karnataka who competes in men's 1500 m T12/T13 event. He represented India at the 2026 Asian Para Games at Aichi Nagoya, Japan, and won a silver medal in the men's 1500 m T13 event. Initially he finished third, but was upgraded to second after Uzbekistan’s Fakhriddin Khamraev was disqualified.

== Career ==
Shankarappa won the silver medal in the men's 1500 metre T13 event at the 2026 Asian Para Games clocking a personal best timing of 4:11.01 and garnering 629 points. In 2023, he won the silver in the men’s T13 1500m race clocking 4min, 13.60sec at the 2022 Asian Para Games in Hangzhou, China. In 2023, he also won the men's T13 5000m event but the gold was not counted as there were only two participants in the event.
