= Tejas Nandakumar =

Indian para swimmer (born 2007)

Personal information
- Born: 2005 (age 20–21) Bengaluru, Karnatka, India

Sport
- Country: India
- Sport: Para-swimming
- Disability class: S7
Medal record
Men's swimming
Representing India
Asian Para Games
Bronze medal – third place	2026 Aichi-Nagoya	100 m backstroke S7
- Updated on 4 November 2026

Tejas Nandakumar (born 2005) is an Indian para swimmer from Karnataka. He won a bronze medal in the men’s 100 m backstroke S7 event at the 2026 Asian Para Games in Aichi Nagoya, Japan.

== Early life ==
Nandakumar is from Bengaluru, Karnataka.

== Career ==
Nandakumar won a bronze medal in the 100 m backstroke S7 event at the 2026 Asian Para Games clocking 1 minute, 18.58 seconds behind China's Jingsong Ruan who claimed gold in 1:12.16 and Singapore's Wei Song Toh, who took silver in 1:16.09.
