= Sukhchain (para-athlete) =

Indian para-athlete (born 1994)

Sukhchain (born 1994) is an Indian para-athlete who competes in men's javelin throw F55 event. He represented India at the 2026 Asian Para Games at Aichi Nagoya, Japan, and won a bronze medal in the men's javelin throw F55 event.

== Career ==
Sukhchain won a bronze medal in the men's javelin throw F55 event at the 2026 Asian Para Games with a throw of 29.94 metres behind China’s Zhou Feifei who won the gold medal with a 37.63m throw and Iran’s Zafar Zaker who took silver with a throw of 36.00m.

Earlier in 2026, he won gold at the World Para Athletics Grand Prix in Delhi with a personal best of 31.18m.
