= Rakeshbhai Bhatt =

Indian track and field para athlete (born 2001)

Praveen Sharma
Personal information
- Born: 14 April 2001 (age 25) Moti Babariyat village, Bhavnagar district, Gujarat, India
Medal record
Men's Para track and field
Representing India
Asian Para Games
Bronze medal – third place	2026 Aichi-Nagoya	100m T37 race

Rakeshbhai Bhatt (born 14 April 2001) is an Indian para athlete. He has won a bronze medal in the men's 100m T37 race at the 2026 Asian Para Games.

== Early life ==
Bhatt is from Moti Babariyat village, Bhavnagar district, Gujarat, India. He is national record holder in T37 100m and Asian record in T37 200m.

== Career ==
He won gold in 100m and 200m at the World Para Athletics Grand Prix 2026, New Delhi. He won bronze medal in T37 100m with his personal best of 11.50 seconds at 2026 Asian Para Games.
