= Mahendra Gurjar =

Indian para-athlete (born 1998)

Mahendra Gurjar (born 12 April 1998) is an Indian track and field para-athlete from Rajasthan. He won a silver medal in men's javelin throw F42-44/61-64 event at 2026 Asian Para Games in Aichi Nagoya, Japan.

== Career ==
He won the silver medal in the men's javelin throw F42 at the 2026 Asian Para Games with a best throw of 59.03m on 23 October 2026. In May 2025, he won the gold medal with a world record throw of 61.17m at the Nottwil World Para Athletics Grand Prix in Switzerland.
