= Rakesh Kumar (para-athlete) =

Indian para-athlete

Rakesh Kumar (born 1995) is an Indian para-athlete who competes in men's discus throw F44 events. He represented India at the 2026 Asian Para Games and won a silver medal in the men's discus throw.

== Career ==
Kumar won the silver medal in the 2026 Asian Para Games in the men's discus throw F44 class with a score of 771 points following his fourth throw of 49.35 metres.
