= Ajay Kumar (para-athlete) =

Indian para-athlete (born 1990)

Ajay Kumar (born 28 July 1990) is an Indian track and field para-athlete from Himachal Pradesh. He represented India at the 2026 Asian Para Games at Aichi Nagoya, Japan, and won a bronze medal in the men's 400 m T64 race.

== Early life ==
Kumar is from Nagwain village, Mandi district, Himachal Pradesh. He joined theIndian Army in 2010. While on duty in Jammu and Kashmir as a soldier, he lost his leg in November 2017. In 2018, he was introduced to para sports by Lalit Thakur, who founded the Himachal Pradesh Para Sports Association.

== Career ==
Kumar won the bronze in the men's 400 m T64 race at the 2026 Asian Para Games clocking 53.61 seconds at the Nagoya City Mizuho Park Athletic Stadium on 23 October 2026. His 53.61s was also better than the existing Games' record.

In 2023, he won a silver medal at the 2022 Asian Para Games in Hangzhou, China. The Himachal Pradesh government honoured him with a cash prize of Rs.2.5 crore for his silver medal at the Asiad. He made his debut at the Indian National Para Championship in 2021 and won multiple gold medals.
