= Pranav Desai =

Indian para-athlete

Pranav Desai is an Indian track and field para-athlete from Maharashtra. He represented India at the 2026 Asian Para Games at Aichi Nagoya, Japan, and won a bronze medal in the men's 100m T64 sprint race.

== Early life ==
Desai is from Thane, Maharashtra. He started athletcis at Dadoji Konddev Stadium in 2016 under coach Nilesh Patkar. Later, he trained under coach R Suresh Kumar.

== Career ==
Desai won the bronze medal in the men's 100m T64 sprint at the 2026 Asian Para Games with a timing of 11.96 seconds on 21 October 2026. He finished behind Kengo Oshima of Japan, who won gold with a time of 11.39, and Denpoom Kotcharang of Thailand who took silver with a time of 11.78 seconds. This is his third Asian Para Games. In 2023, he finished fourth at the 2022 Hangzhou Asian Para Games with a time of 11.91 seconds.
