= Ravi Budigina =

Indian para swimmer (born 2007)

Personal information
- Born: 23 October 2007 (age 19) Andhra Pradesh, India

Sport
- Country: India
- Sport: Para-swimming
- Disability class: S13
Medal record
Men's swimming
Representing India
Asian Para Games
Silver medal – second place	2026 Aichi-Nagoya	100 m freestyle S13
Silver medal – second place	2026 Aichi-Nagoya	100 m backstroke S13
Bronze medal – third place	2026 Aichi-Nagoya	50 m freestyle S13
- Updated on 4 November 2026

Ravi Karthik Budigina (born 23 October 2007) is an Indian para swimmer from Andhra Pradesh. He won a silver medal in the men’s 100m freestyle S13 event at the 2026 Asian Para Games in Aichi Nagoya, Japan. He also competes in the SB13 and SM13 categories for athletes with visual impairments.

== Career ==
He won the silver medal at the 2026 Asian Games, clocking 56.68 seconds to finish behind Uzbekistan’s Egor Bolotov, who claimed gold in 52.90 seconds.

In 2025, he won three gold and three silver medals at the 2025 Asian Youth Para Games in Dubai. He won gold medals in the in the 200m Individual Medley, 100m Butterfly and 100m Breaststroke events. His silver medals came in the 100m Freestyle, 100m Backstroke and 50m Freestyle.

He also represented India at the 2026 Commonwealth Games held in Glasgow. He qualified for the finals and finished fourth in the men's 100m freestyle S13 event.
