= Rohit Kumar (swimmer) =

Indian para swimmer

Sport
- Country: India
- Sport: Para-swimming
- Disability class: S4
Medal record
Men's swimming
Representing India
Asian Para Games
Bronze medal – third place	2026 Aichi-Nagoya	100 m breaststroke SB4
- Updated on 4 November 2026

Rohit Kumar (born 25 August 2001) is an Indian para swimmer. He won a bronze medal in the men’s 100 m breaststroke SB4 event at the 2026 Asian Para Games in Aichi Nagoya, Japan.

== Career ==
Kumar won a bronze in the men’s 100m backstroke SB4 at the Asian Para Games in Aichi Nagoya on 21 October 2026. He clocked 1 minute, 57.25 seconds behind Malaysia’s Muhammad Bin Zulkafli who took gold with time of 1:41.44 and Kazakhstan’s Ali Turganbekov, who bagged silver in 1:44.26. He was trailing fourth at the halfway mark but fought back in the last 50m to bag a bronze medal. The SB4 classification is for breaststroke swimmers with physical impairments, including certain combinations of short stature and additional impairments, or moderate coordination problems throughout the body.
