= Tejalben Damor =

Indian para athlete

Personal information
- Nationality: Indian
- Born: Tejalben Amraji Damor; 2002 (age 23–24)

Sport
- Country: India
- Sport: Para athletics
- Events: 200m, 400m T12
- Club: SAI National Centre of Excellence, Gandhinagar
- Coached by: Nitin Choudhary
Medal record
Women's para athletics
Representing India
Asian Para Games
Silver medal – second place	2026 Aichi-Nagoya	400m T12
Bronze medal – third place	2026 Aichi-Nagoya	200m T12

Tejalben Amraji Damor (born 2002) is an Indian para athlete from Gujarat who competes in women's 200m and 400m T12 races. She won a bronze medal at the 2026 Asian Para Games at Aichi Nagoya, Japan, in the women's 200 m T12 race for the visually impaired.

== Early life ==
Damor is from Dahod, Gujarat. She trains at the Sports Authority of India's National Centre of Excellence (SAI NCoE) in Gandhinagar, Gujarat. She trrained under coach Nitin Choudhary.

== Career ==
Damor won a bronze medal in the women's 200m T12 race clocking a personal best time of 25.23 seconds at the 2026 Asian Para Games on 20 October 2026. Earlier, she clocked 25.4 seconds winning the gold at the Dubai Para Athletics Grand Prix, the 17th Fazza International Para Athletics Championship in September 2026.

In 2025, she won a gold medal at the National Championships and finished sixth at the World Para Athletics Championships.
