= Ravanni Valasanaini =

Indian para athlete (born 2007)

Personal information
- Born: 24 July 2007 (age 19) Andhra Pradesh, India
Medal record
Women's para-athletics
Representing India
Asian Para Games
Bronze medal – third place	2026 Aichi-Nagoya	1500 m T11
Asian Youth Para Games
Bronze medal – third place	2025 Dubai	200 m T11-13

Ravanni Valasanaini (born 24 July 2007) is an Indian para-athlete who represents India in the women's 1500 metres.

Valasanaini is from Alluri Sitharama Raju district, Andhra Pradesh.

At the 2026 Asian Para Games, Valsanaini was running with her guide Rahul Balakrishna, where she clocked a personal best time of 5 minutes, 41.85 seconds and finished fourth but was later promoted to third place following the disqualification of her compatriot Rakshitha Raju.
