= Anubhav Choudhary =

Indian para-athlete

Personal information
- Nationality: Indian
- Born: Chhur, Meerut district, Uttar Pradesh, India

Sport
- Country: India
- Sport: Para-athletics
- Disability class: T35
- Events: 100 metres, 200 metres

Anubhav Choudhary is an Indian track and field para-athlete from Uttar Pradesh. He represented India at the 2026 Asian Para Games at Aichi Nagoya, Japan, and won a bronze medal in the men's 100m T35 sprint race.

== Early life ==
Choudhary is from Chhur village, Meerut district, Uttar Pradesh. He learnt his basics under coach Gaurav Tyagi before moving to Delhi, where he trained under coach Rahul Panwar.

== Career ==
Choudhary won the bronze medal in the men's 100m T35 sprint race at the 2026 Asian Para Games. He clocked a personal best of 12.72 seconds on 21 October 2026 behind Iran’s Alireza Zare who won the gold medal with a Games Record time of 12.32s and Iraq’s Idrees Al-Zaidi who took the silver in 12.69s. Later on 23 October 2026, he entered the men’s 200m T35 final but could only finish fourth clocking a personal best time of 26.48 seconds.
