= Solairaj Dharmaraj =

Indian Paralympic athlete (born 1994)

Personal information
- Born: 1994 (age 31–32) Tamil Nadu, India

Sport
- Sport: Paralympic athletics
Medal record
Men's para-athletics
Representing India
Asian Para Games
Gold medal – first place	2022 Hangzhou	Long jump T64

Solairaj Dharmaraj (born 22 May 1994) is an Indian para athlete from Tamil Nadu.

== Background ==
Dharmaraj is a subedar in the Indian Army and after he lost a leg he took to sports in 2018 and became a paralympian.

== Career ==
He won gold medal in the men's long jump T64 event at the 2022 Asian Para Games at Hangzhou, China on 27 October 2023. He jumped to a distance of 6.80m defeating Sri Lankan Maththaka Gamage (6.68m) to create a new games record. He failed his first three jumps and then logged 6.36m in his fourth. After another failed attempt, he leaped to a gold-winning 6.80m in his sixth and final jump. He beat the Asian Record held by compatriot, Ramudri Someswara Rao, who set a distance of 6.42 at Dubai in March 2022. Rao, also competed here but could only jump to 6.18m for a bronze.

He was also congratulated by the prime minister, Narendra Modi for winning a gold medal.

In May 2024, he took part in the World Para Athletic Championship in Kobe, Japan, which was the final qualifying tournament for the Paris Paralympics.

In March 2025, representing Tamil Nadu, his home state, Dharmaraj won the gold medal in the combined men's long jump T44/T64 category at the Khelo India para games 2025, held at Indira Gandhi Stadium in New Delhi.

=== Other activity ===
In November 2024, Dharmaraj attended a show where advanced military equipment and weaponry were displayed for school students, NCC cadets and civil-military dignitaries as part of the Veer Gatha 2024, a joint initiative of the Ministry of Defence (MoD) and Ministry of Education (MoE) at Dhono Dhanyo Auditorium in Kolkata.
