= Soumya Kumar =

Indian para athlete

Soumya is a track & field para athlete from Karnataka who represents India in the Women's 1500 metres. She won a gold medal in the T12 category for the visually impaired athletes at the 2026 Asian Para Games. She took part along with her guide Kumar Bharath and clocked a personal-best time of 5 minutes and 12.39 seconds. She topped the final with 621 points to bag the gold.

== Early life ==
Kumar is from Kollegal, Chamarajanagar district, Karnataka. She trains under coach Roshan Agni Shreedhar Bachchan at the Indian Athletic Academy, Jayanagar, Bengaluru.

== Career ==
Kumar made her Asian Games debut at the 2026 Asian Para Games at Aichi Nagoya, Japan and won the gold medal in the women's 1500 metres in the T12 category..

She won the 2025 Asian Youth Para Games. In 2026, she won gold medals at the New Delhi Grand Prix and the Indian Open.
