= Himanshu Nandal =

Indian para swimmer

Personal information
- Born: Himanshu Nandal; 2004 (age 21–22) Rohtak, Haryana, India

Sport
- Country: India
- Events: Butterfly, Freestyle
- Coached by: Ranbir Sharma
Medal record
Representing India
Men's Para-Swimming
Asian Para Games
Bronze medal – third place	2026 Aichi-Nagoya	400 m freestyle S11
Bronze medal – third place	2026 Aichi-Nagoya	100 m breaststroke SB11
Bronze medal – third place	2026 Aichi-Nagoya	100 m freestyle S11

Himanshu Nandal (born 2004) is an Indian para swimmer known for his national and international competitions accomplishments. Born in Rohtak, Haryana, Nandal is 100 percent visually impaired due to optic nerve failure from birth. Nandal won two gold medals and set a national record at the National Para Swimming Championship Udaipur in March 2022. He won three gold medals and set three national records at the National Para Championship Guwahati in November 2022.

== Early life and background ==
Nandal comes from a family of sportspersons. His father, Balwant Singh is a former national hockey player currently with the Haryana Police. His uncle, Manjeet Nandal, represented India in judo at the 2014 Commonwealth Games. Nandal initially pursued judo in 2017 before transitioning to swimming in 2021 to maintain his fitness and continue his interest in sports.

== Swimming career ==
Nandal began his formal swimming training in October 2021 at the Siri Fort Sports Complex under coach Ranbir Sharma. Sharma used specific training methods to accommodate Nandal's visual impairment, such as physically guiding his arm movements.

In March 2022, Nandal debuted at the National Para Swimming Championship in Udaipur, where he won two gold medals and set a national record. He continued to perform well in November 2022 at the National Para Championship in Guwahati, winning three gold medals and setting three national records. In April 2023, Nandal competed in the Citi World Para Series in Singapore, qualifying for the Asian Para Games 2022 in Hangzhou. In March 2024, he won three gold medals at the National Para Swimming Championship in Gwalior.

Nandal received sponsorship from the National Mineral Development Corporation, which provided approximately Rs 2 lakh for his participation in the Citi World Para Series in Singapore in May 2024. During this event, Nandal met the minimum qualification standards in the 100-meter breaststroke and the minimum entry times in the 100-meter backstroke and 200-meter individual medley, qualifying for the Paris Paralympics 2024.

== Achievements ==
- Participated in Asian Para Games, 2022
- 21st Para National Championship 2022 - Gold medal
- 22nd Para National Championship 2022 - Gold medal

== See also ==
- Paralympic Committee of India
- Paralympic Games
- Summer Paralympic Games
- India at the 2022 Asian Para Games
- India at the 2024 Summer Paralympics
