= Parmod Bijarnia =

Indian para-athlete

Parmod Bijarnia is an Indian para-athlete who competes in men's men's 1500 m T46 event. He represented India at the 2026 Asian Para Games at Aichi Nagoya, Japan, and won a silver medal in the men's 1500 m T46 event.

== Career ==
Bijarnia won the silver medal in the men's 1500 m T46 event at the 2026 Asian Para Games clocking 4 minutes, 09.65 seconds at the Nagoya City Mizuho Park Athletic Stadium.
