= Pradeep Somasiri =

Sri Lankan Paralympic athlete

Personal information
- National team: Sri Lanka

Sport
- Sport: Para-athletics
- Disability class: T46
Medal record
Women's Athletics
Representing Sri Lanka
Asian Para Games
Gold medal – first place	2022 Hangzhou	1500m

Pradeep Somasiri is a Sri Lankan para middle-distance runner.

== Career ==
He was part of the Sri Lankan contingent which took part at the 2023 World Para Athletics Grand Prix.

In October 2023, he claimed a gold medal in the men's 1500m T46 category at the 2022 Asian Para Games with a timing of 4:05.14 minutes.
