= Kasthuri Rajamani =

Indian para power lifter (born 1984)

Personal information
- Nationality: Indian
- Born: 23 August 1984 (age 42) Tamil Nadu, India

Sport
- Sport: Para powerlifting
- Weight class: 67 kg
- Club: Sports Authority of India
- Coached by: G. Vijaya Sarathy
- Updated on 23 April 2025

Kasthuri Rajamani (born 23 August 1984) is an Indian para power lifter from Tamil Nadu. She qualified to represent India at the 2024 Summer Paralympics in Paris in the women's 67 kg category.

== Early life ==
Kasthuri was affected by polio in both of her legs during childhood. She also lost her mother early in life and was raised up by her grandmother. A friend, who is a sport shooter, took her to the boxing academy at a Corporation Ground in Nungambakkam, Chennai, for training in powerlifting in December 2018. Later, she was trained by G. Vijaya Sarathy, a senior para coach with Sports Development Authority of Tamil Nadu. In 2023, she was recruited by Sports Authority for India for further training.

== Career ==
She represented India at the 2022 Asian Para Games at Hangzhou, China and finished 5th in the 67 kg category.

In December 2023, she won a gold medal in the elite 67kg event with a lift of 100kg in her third attempt, at the Khelo India Para Games powerlifting competition in New Delhi.

With a personal best score of 106 kg, she finished 8th in the Paris Paralympics.
