= Ram Ratan Singh (discus thrower) =

Indian para athlete

Ram Ratan Singh (born 1995) is an Indian para athlete who competes in men's Men's discus throw F51-53. He represented India at the 2026 Asian Para Games at Aichi Nagoya, Japan, and won a silver medal in the men's discus throw F51-53 behind teammate, Pranav Soorma, who won the gold, making it a 1-2 for India.

== Career ==
Singh won the silver medal in the men's discus throw F51 event at the 2026 Asian Para Games. His throw of 10.35m in the second round garnered him 809 Raza points on 20 October 2026.
