= Okazaki (surname) =

Okazaki (written: 岡崎) is a Japanese surname. Notable people with the surname include:

- Hanamaru Hakata (born 1970), stage name of Japanese comedian Mitsuteru Okazaki, father of Momoko Okazaki
- Chieko N. Okazaki (1926–2011), former counselor in the General Relief Society Presidency of the Church of Jesus Christ of Latter-day Saints
- Dai Okazaki (AKA "Smelly", born 1971), Japanese comedic performer and former manga artist
- Emiko Okazaki (岡崎 恵美子; born 1949), Japanese alpine skier
- Hiroshi Okazaki (岡崎 洋; born 1967), Japanese shogi player
- Isao Okazaki (1920–2006), Japanese right-wing activist
- Katsuo Okazaki (1897–1965), served as the Japanese Foreign Minister between 1952 and 1954
- Kenjiro Okazaki (born 1955), Japanese visual artist
- Kyoko Okazaki (born 1963), Japanese manga artist, winner of the Tezuka Osamu Cultural Prize in 2004
- Makoto Okazaki (岡崎 慎, born 1998), Japanese football player
- Miles Okazaki (born 1974), American guitarist, arranger, and composer
- Momoko Okazaki (born 2003), Japanese singer and dancer known as "Momometal" in Babymetal, daughter of Hanamaru Hakata
- Reiji Okazaki (1930–1975), Japanese scientist
- Ritsuko Okazaki (1959–2004), Japanese singer-songwriter
- Satoko Okazaki (岡崎 聡子; born 1961), Japanese gymnast
- Seishiro Okazaki (1890–1951), founder of the Danzan Ryu school of Jūjutsu
- Shinji Okazaki (born 1986), Japanese footballer
- Steven Okazaki (born 1952), Japanese-American filmmaker
- Tadao Okazaki (born 1943), Japanese artist
- Takashi Okazaki, Japanese manga artist known for Afro Samurai
- Takayuki Okazaki (岡崎 高之; born 1940), Japanese long jumper
- Teruyuki Okazaki (born 1931), founder, chairman and chief instructor of the International Shotokan Karate Federation
- Tomiko Okazaki (1944–2017), Japanese politician of the Democratic Party of Japan
- Tomomi Okazaki (born 1971), Japanese speed skater
- Tsuneko Okazaki (岡崎 恒子; 1933–2026), Japanese scientist

== Fictional characters ==
- Jen Okazaki, character in the Australian mockumentary series Angry Boys
- Tim Okazaki, Jen's son, also from Angry Boys
- Okazaki, from the novel series Ring
- Tomoya Okazaki, the main character from the visual novel and anime Clannad
- Yumemi Okazaki, a character from the Touhou Project series
