= Praveen Sharma =

Indian para-athlete

Personal information
- Born: 2007 (age 18–19) Bansarai, Dholpur district, Rajasthan, India
Medal record
Men's Para track and field
Representing India
Asian Para Games
Bronze medal – third place	2026 Aichi-Nagoya	shot put F11

Praveen Sharma (born 2007) is an Indian track and field para-athlete from Rajasthan. He won a bronze medal in men's shot put F11 at 2026 Asian Para Games.

== Early life ==
Sharma is originally from Bansarai village in Dholpur district, Rajasthan, India. At the age of two, he lost his eyesight because of severe reaction that caused Stevens–Johnson Syndrome. He started sports in 2021 training under coach Suresh Kumar.

== Career ==
Sharma secured silver in the men's shot put F11 and bronze in the discus throw F11 at the Khelo India Para Games 2025. At the World Para Athletics Grand Prix 2026 in New Delhi, he won gold in the men's shot put F11/F12/F20 event with a throw of 13.31 metres and also won silver in discus throw F11/F12. He recorded his personal best of 13.86 metres at 2026 Asian Para Games to win bronze medal in men's shot put F11.
