= Abhijeet Sakhuja =

Indian para badminton player

Abhijeet Sakhuja (born 14 April 2005) is an Indian para-badminton player from Chhattisgarh. He represented India at 2026 Asian Para games in Aichi Nagoya, Japan, and won a bronze medal in men's singles SL4 event.

Sakhuja is from Bilaspur, Chhattisgarh.

== Career ==
Sakhuja won a bronze medal in men's singles SL4 event at the 2026 Asian Para Games on 22 October 2026 losing the semifinal 21-13, 21-15 to teammate Naveen Sivakumar, who went on to win the gold.
