= Yang Qiuxia =

Yang Qiuxia may refer to:

- Yang Qiuxia (badminton)
- Yang Qiuxia (weightlifter)
