= Toman Kumar =

Indian para archer

Toman Kumar (born 1995) is an Indian para-archer from Chhattisgarh who competes in compound archery events. He represented India in the 2026 Asian Para Games at Aichi- Nagoya, Japan, and won a gold medal in the compound mixed team event alongside Sheetal Devi.

== Early life ==
Kumar is from Nawagaon village in Balod district, Chhattisgarh. He joined Central Reserve Police Force (CRPF) as a constable in 2017. In 2021, he underwent training at the elite Commando Battalion for Resolute Action (CoBRA) unit. Later, he lost his leg in a blast during a counter-insurgency operation in 2022.

== Career ==
Kumar won a gold in the compound mixed team event along with Sheetal Devi in the 2026 Asian Para Games defeating Indonesia's Teodora Audi Ayudia Ferelly and Ken Swagumilang 151-148 in the final. The Indian duo set a world record in the qualification rounds aggregating 1,402 points, two more than the previous world record.

Earlier in 2026, he won a gold at the World Archery Para Championships held at Gwangju.
