= Jehan Madan =

Indian para table tennis player (born 1976)

Jehan Dorab Madan (born 1976) is an Indian para-athlete and table tennis player from Tamil Nadu. He represented India at the 2026 Asian Para Games at Aichi Nagoya, Japan, and won two bronze medals in the table tennis events. He won a bronze in the men's class 1 singles on 20 October 2026 and then partnered with Shubham Wadhwa in the men's doubles MD4 for a second bronze on 23 October 2026.

== Early life ==
Madan is from Chennai, Tamil Nadu. In 2021, he met with a road accident in Mumbai, that paralysed him below the waist. He was a former racing driver.

== Career ==
Earlier, he won a silver medal in men's singles at Kaohsiung ITTF event, losing to Olympic medallist Joo Young Dae of South Korea. In March 2026, he also won a gold at the Khelo India Para Games.
