= Swati Chaudhary =

Indian para archer

Personal information
- Nationality: Indian
- Born: 1989 (age 36–37)
- Home town: Meerut, Uttar Pradesh

Sport
- Country: India
- Sport: Para archery
- Event: W1
- Club: Gurukul Archery Academy, Meerut
- Coached by: Satyadev Prasad
Medal record
Women's para archery
Representing India
Asian Para Games
Silver medal – second place	2026 Aichi-Nagoya	Individual W1
World Archery Para Series
Bronze medal – third place	2026 Ahmedabad	Individual W1

Swati Chaudhary (born 1989) is an Indian para archer from Uttar Pradesh. She represented India at the 2026 Asian Para Games at Aichi Nagoya, Japan and won a silver medal in the women's W1 individual archery event.

Chaudhary is from Meerut, Uttar Pradesh. She trains under Athens Olympian Satyadev Prasad at the Gurukul Archery Academy in Meerut. She competes in W1, a classification for archers with significant impairments, affecting both the upper and lower limbs, and hence they compete in a wheelchair.

== Career ==
Chaudhary won a silver medal at the 2026 Asian Para Games losing the final to No.23 Chinese archer Mengkan Cen 4-6. She took a 4-2 lead but thereafter allowed the Chinese archer to make a comeback. In September 2026, she won a bronze medal at the World Archery Para Series in Ahmedabad.
