= Jayanti Behera =

Indian para sprinter

Personal information
- Nationality: Indian
- Born: 11 June 1999 (age 27) Sakhigopal, Puri, Odisha India
- Height: 150 cm (59 in)
- Weight: 40 kg (88 lb)

Sport
- Country: India
- Sport: Track & field
- Disability: Burn contracture of left elbow & claw left hand with non-functional fingers
- Disability class: T-47
- Events: 200m, 400m, 800m
- Now coaching: Bishnu Prasad Mishra
Medal record
Women's Track & Field
Representing India
World Junior Championships
Gold medal – first place	2017 Nottwil	400m T47
Silver medal – second place	2017 Nottwil	200m T47
Asian Para Games
Bronze medal – third place	2018 Jakarta	200m T45/46/47
National Championships
Gold medal – first place	2018 Panchkula	100m T47
Gold medal – first place	2018 Panchkula	200m T47
Gold medal – first place	2018 Panchkula	400m T47

Jayanti Behera (born 11 June 1999) is a track & field paralympic athlete who represents India in the Women's 200m, 400m, and 800m event. She is a world youth champion in the TR 400m event and she has also won the gold medal at the recent National Para Athletics Championships 2018 in Panchkula. She is supported by the GoSports Foundation through the Para Champions Programme.

== Childhood and early life ==
Jayanti Behera was born on 11 June 1999 in a poor family in Manitilasahi village under Sakhigopal of Puri district of Odisha, India. Her mother, Ashamani is a housewife and her father, Kunja Behera works as a daily laborer in coconut plantations of Sakhigopal. She is the youngest among her three siblings and studied in Sri Ram Chandrapur High School in Sakhigopal.

=== Injury ===
Jayanti Behera was just one year old when she accidentally fell into a brick kiln lit with fire. Though her mother noticed and dragged her out immediately, the mishap left her with severe second degree burns on the left side of her upper body and a burn contracture on left elbow and non functional fingers.

Jayanti would watch students run around and play at school and decided to take up sprinting as a sport in class VII even though it was a painful experience for her. Her skills were noticed by her coach Bishnu Prasad Mishra during a school athletic meet in which she won the first prize. Mishra brought her to his Gurukul Athletic Training Centre at Sakhigopal and started training her for athletics free of cost as Jayanti's family was unable to afford her coaching and nutrition.

== Career ==
Jayanti won a gold medal in 400m and silver in 800m at the 66th Odisha State Athletics Meet held at Cuttack in December 2018. She bagged a double by winning gold medals in U-20 girls' 400m and 800m events of the 65th Odisha State Athletics Championship held at Cuttack in December 2017. She also bagged a double by winning titles in U-20 girls' 800m and 1500m events of the 63rd Odisha State Athletics Meet held at Cuttack in December 2015. Jayanti won three gold medals at the 16th Para-athletics National Championship at Panchkula, Haryana in 2016. Jayanti had participated in the Under-20 and Under-18 sprinting events in the State athletic meets at Cuttack in 2013, 2014 and 2015 and grabbed gold and silver medals in 100m, 200m and 400m events.

=== International representation ===
Jayanti Behera won a silver and a bronze medal in women's 400m (with a timing of 59.71 seconds) and 200m (with a timing of 27.45 seconds) T45/46/47 events respectively at 3rd Asian Para Games, held in Jakarta, Indonesia in 2018. She bagged a gold medal in T42-T47 400m and silver in 200m events of the World Junior Para Athletics Championships held at Nottwil, Switzerland in 2017. She also won one gold in 400m and one silver in 200m events of the China Open Para Athletics Grand Prix Championships held from 13 to 15 May 2017 and registered the qualifying mark for the 2017 World Para Athletics Championships.

Jayanti represented India at the World Senior Para Athletics Championships held at London in July 2017 where she was the youngest competitor at 17 and finished sixth in 400m event. She won a silver medal in a 100m race at Asian Youth Para games-2017 in Dubai with clocking a timing of 13.48 seconds.

=== Recognition ===
Naveen Patnaik, Chief Minister of Odisha, announced a prize of Rs. 10 Lakh for Jayanti for winning bronze medal in 3rd Asian Para Games in 2018. She is supported by the GoSports Foundation through the Para Champions programme. She also got cash awards for outstanding sports performance for the year 2016-17: Odisha for securing gold medals in 200m and 800m of the 16th Senior National Para Athletics Championships held at Panchkula in March 2016.

== Achievements ==
National Para Athletics Championships

Year	Venue	Event	Result
2018	Cuttack	400m	Gold
2018	Cuttack	800m	Silver
2018	Panchkula	100m	Gold
2018	Panchkula	200m	Gold
2018	Panchkula	400m	Gold

Year	Venue	Event	Result
2018	Jakarta	400m	Silver
2018	Jakarta	200m	Bronze
2017	Switzerland	400m	Gold
2017	Switzerland	200m	Silver
2017	China	400m	Gold
2017	China	200m	Silver
2017	Dubai	100m	Silver
2017	London	400m	6th place
