= List of flag bearers for Saudi Arabia at the Paralympics =

Saudi Arabia at the Paralympics
- IOC code: KSA
- NOC: Saudi Arabian Olympic Committee
- Website: olympic.sa (in Arabic and English)
- Medals: Gold 0 Silver 0 Bronze 0 Total 0

Summer appearances
- 1996; 2000; 2004; 2008; 2012; 2016; 2020; 2024

This is a list of flag bearers for Saudi Arabia at the Paralympics.

Flag bearers carry the national flag of their country at the opening ceremony of the Paralympic Games.

Event year	Season	Flag bearer	Sport	Ref.
2008	Summer	Osamah Al-Shanqiti	Athletics	
2012	Summer	Osamah Al-Shanqiti	Athletics	
2016	Summer	Asaad Sharaheli	Athletics	
2020	Summer	Sarah Al-Jumaah	Athletics	
2020	Summer	Ahmed Al-Sharbatly	Equestrianism	
2024	Summer	Abdulrahman Al-Qurashi	Athletics	
2024	Summer	Ghalia Al-Anzi	Table tennis	
