= Indonesia at the Paralympics =

- IPC code: INA
- NPC: National Paralympic Committee of Indonesia
- Website: www.npcindonesia.org (in Indonesian)
- Medals Ranked 64th: Gold 7 Silver 15 Bronze 19 Total 41

Summer appearances
- 1976; 1980; 1984; 1988; 1992; 1996; 2000; 2004; 2008; 2012; 2016; 2020; 2024

Indonesia made its Paralympic Games debut at the 1976 Summer Paralympics in Toronto, with competitors in athletics, lawn bowls, swimming and table tennis. The country has participated in every subsequent edition of the Summer Paralympics, except 1992, but has never taken part in the Winter Paralympics.

As of 2020 edition, Indonesians have won a total of twenty-seven Paralympic medals: six gold, seven silver and fourteen bronze. The country's first two gold medals were won in 1976, by Itria Dini in the men's precision javelin (category F), and by Syarifuddin in the men's singles in lawn bowls (category E). Yan Soebiyanto won Indonesia's third gold medal in that same event four years later, while R.S. Arlen took gold in weightlifting, in the men's featherweight amputee category. In addition to these gold medals, Indonesians won a silver and three bronzes in 1976, and four bronze in 1980. 1984 yielded a silver medal and a bronze, but no gold, while in 1988 Indonesia won two silver medals.

After its absence in 1992, Indonesia sent significantly smaller delegations to the Paralympics, and no Indonesian won a Paralympic medal until the 2012 Paralympic Games. Indonesia sent four athletes to the 2012 Paralympic Games, and David Jacobs won bronze in the Table Tennis - Men's Individual C10 classification.

In Rio de Janeiro 2016, Indonesia got its only medal from powerlifting after Ni Nengah Widiasih successfully lifted 95 kg. In Tokyo 2020, Indonesia ended a long-waiting gold for over 40 years after Leani Ratri Oktila won two gold medals from badminton with her partners; Khalimatus Sadiyah in women's doubles SL3-SU5 and Hary Susanto in mixed doubles SL3-SU5, respectively.

== Medal tables ==
=== Medals by Summer Games ===
Games	Athletes	Gold	Silver	Bronze	Total	Rank
(Italy) Rome 1960	Did not participate					
(Japan) Tokyo 1964	Did not participate					
(Israel) Tel Aviv 1968	Did not participate					
(West Germany) Heidelberg 1972	Did not participate					
(Canada) Toronto 1976	18	2	1	3	6	26
(Netherlands) Arnhem 1980	29	2	0	4	6	28
(United States) New York/ (United Kingdom); Stoke Mandeville 1984	12	0	1	1	2	41
(South Korea) Seoul 1988	22	0	2	0	2	43
(Spain) Barcelona/Madrid 1992	Did not participate					
(United States) Atlanta 1996	1	0	0	0	0	−
(Australia) Sydney 2000	5	0	0	0	0	−
(Greece) Athens 2004	3	0	0	0	0	−
(China) Beijing 2008	3	0	0	0	0	−
(United Kingdom) London 2012	4	0	0	1	1	74
(Brazil) Rio de Janeiro 2016	9	0	0	1	1	76
(Japan) Tokyo 2020	23	2	3	4	9	43
(France) Paris 2024	35	1	8	5	14	50
(United States) Los Angeles 2028	Future event					
(Australia) Brisbane 2032	Future event					
Total		7	15	19	41	65

=== Medals by Winter Games ===
Games	Athletes	Gold	Silver	Bronze	Total	Rank
(Sweden) Örnsköldsvik 1976	Did not participate					
(Norway) Geilo 1980	Did not participate					
(Austria) Innsbruck 1984	Did not participate					
(Austria) Innsbruck 1988	Did not participate					
(France) Albertville 1992	Did not participate					
(Norway) Lillehammer 1994	Did not participate					
(Japan) Nagano 1998	Did not participate					
(United States) Salt Lake City 2002	Did not participate					
(Italy) Turin 2006	Did not participate					
(Canada) Vancouver 2010	Did not participate					
(Russia) Sochi 2014	Did not participate					
(South Korea) Pyeongchang 2018	Did not participate					
(China) Beijing 2022	Did not participate					
(Italy) Milan / Cortina d'Ampezzo 2026	Did not participate					
(France) French Alps 2030	Future event					
(United States) Utah 2034	Future event					
Total		0	0	0	0	−

== Medals by sports ==
=== Medals by Summer Sports ===
Sport	Gold	Silver	Bronze	Total
Badminton	3	6	5	14
Lawn bowls	2	1	5	8
Athletics	1	5	4	10
Weightlifting	1	0	0	1
Boccia	0	2	2	4
Powerlifting	0	1	1	2
Table tennis	0	0	2	2
Totals (7 entries)	7	15	19	41

== List of medalists ==
Medal	Name	Games	Sport	Event
Gold	Itria Dini	(Canada) Toronto 1976	Athletics	Men's precision javelin throw F
Gold	Syarifuddin	(Canada) Toronto 1976	Lawn bowls	Men's singles E
Silver	Ashari	(Canada) Toronto 1976	Athletics	Men's 100 meters E
Bronze	Itria Dini	(Canada) Toronto 1976	Athletics	Men's shot put F
Bronze	Saneng Hanafi	(Canada) Toronto 1976	Athletics	Men's discus throw F
Bronze	Saneng Hanafi	(Canada) Toronto 1976	Athletics	Men's javelin throw F
Gold	Yan Soebiyanto	(Netherlands) Arnhem 1980	Lawn bowls	Men's singles E
Gold	R.S. Arlen	(Netherlands) Arnhem 1980	Weightlifting	Men's featherweight -57 kg amputee
Bronze	Sigit Soepadi	(Netherlands) Arnhem 1980	Lawn bowls	Men's singles E
Bronze	Soekarsan	(Netherlands) Arnhem 1980	Lawn bowls	Men's singles F
Bronze	Moenali; Yamin Ismail	(Netherlands) Arnhem 1980	Lawn bowls	Men's pairs C
Bronze	R.S. Arlen; Safri Tanjung	(Netherlands) Arnhem 1980	Lawn bowls	Men's pairs D
Silver	Ninik Umardiyani	(United States) (United Kingdom) New York/Stoke Mandeville 1984	Lawn bowls	Women's singles A2/4
Bronze	Kurnianto; Memed Lesmana	(United States) (United Kingdom) New York/Stoke Mandeville 1984	Lawn bowls	Men's pairs A6/8
Silver	Hadi Abdulaziz	(South Korea) Seoul 1988	Athletics	Men's high jump B1
Silver	Soeparni	(South Korea) Seoul 1988	Athletics	Men's shot put A4/A9
Bronze	David Jacobs	(United Kingdom) London 2012	Table tennis	Men's individual class 10
Bronze	Ni Nengah Widiasih	(Brazil) Rio de Janeiro 2016	Powerlifting	Women's 41 kg
Gold	Leani Ratri Oktila; Khalimatus Sadiyah	(Japan) Tokyo 2020	Badminton	Women's doubles SL3–SU5
Gold	Hary Susanto; Leani Ratri Oktila	(Japan) Tokyo 2020	Badminton	Mixed doubles SL3–SU5
Silver	Ni Nengah Widiasih	(Japan) Tokyo 2020	Powerlifting	Women's 41 kg
Silver	Dheva Anrimusthi	(Japan) Tokyo 2020	Badminton	Men's singles SU5
Silver	Leani Ratri Oktila	(Japan) Tokyo 2020	Badminton	Women's singles SL4
Bronze	Saptoyogo Purnomo	(Japan) Tokyo 2020	Athletics	Men's 100 meters T37
Bronze	David Jacobs	(Japan) Tokyo 2020	Table tennis	Men's individual class 10
Bronze	Suryo Nugroho	(Japan) Tokyo 2020	Badminton	Men's singles SU5
Bronze	Fredy Setiawan	(Japan) Tokyo 2020	Badminton	Men's singles SL4
Gold	Hikmat Ramdani; Leani Ratri Oktila	(France) Paris 2024	Badminton	Mixed doubles SL3–SU5
Silver	Saptoyogo Purnomo	(France) Paris 2024	Athletics	Men's 100 meters T37
Silver	Muhammad Bintang Herlangga	(France) Paris 2024	Boccia	Men's individual BC2
Silver	Qonitah Ikhtiar Syakuroh	(France) Paris 2024	Badminton	Women's singles SL3
Silver	Fredy Setiawan; Khalimatus Sadiyah	(France) Paris 2024	Badminton	Mixed doubles SL3–SU5
Silver	Leani Ratri Oktila	(France) Paris 2024	Badminton	Women's singles SL4
Silver	Suryo Nugroho	(France) Paris 2024	Badminton	Men's singles SU5
Silver	Muhamad Afrizal Syafa; Felix Ardi Yudha; Gischa Zayana	(France) Paris 2024	Boccia	Mixed team BC1–2
Silver	Karisma Evi Tiarani	(France) Paris 2024	Athletics	Women's 100 meters T63
Bronze	Gischa Zayana	(France) Paris 2024	Boccia	Women's individual BC2
Bronze	Muhamad Afrizal Syafa	(France) Paris 2024	Boccia	Men's individual BC1
Bronze	Subhan; Rina Marlina	(France) Paris 2024	Badminton	Mixed doubles SH6
Bronze	Dheva Anrimusthi	(France) Paris 2024	Badminton	Men's singles SU5
Bronze	Fredy Setiawan	(France) Paris 2024	Badminton	Men's singles SL4

=== Medals by individual ===
According to official data of the International Paralympic Committee. This is a list of people who have won two or more Paralympic medals for Indonesia.

Athlete	Sport	Years	Games	Gender	1st place, gold medalist(s)	2nd place, silver medalist(s)	3rd place, bronze medalist(s)	Total
**Leani Ratri Oktila**	Badminton	2020–2024	Summer	Women	3	2	0	5
**Khalimatus Sadiyah**	Badminton	2020–2024	Summer	Women	1	1	0	2
Itria Dini	Athletics	1976	Summer	Men	1	0	1	2
R.S. Arlen	Weightlifting	1980	Summer	Men	1	0	0	2
R.S. Arlen	Lawn bowls	1980	Summer	Men	0	0	1	2
**Fredy Setiawan**	Badminton	2020–2024	Summer	Men	0	1	2	3
**Dheva Anrimusthi**	Badminton	2020–2024	Summer	Men	0	1	1	2
**Gischa Zayana**	Boccia	2024	Summer	Women	0	1	1	2
**Muhamad Afrizal Syafa**	Boccia	2024	Summer	Men	0	1	1	2
**Ni Nengah Widiasih**	Powerlifting	2012–2024	Summer	Women	0	1	1	2
**Saptoyogo Purnomo**	Athletics	2020–2024	Summer	Men	0	1	1	2
**Suryo Nugroho**	Badminton	2020–2024	Summer	Men	0	1	1	2
David Jacobs	Table tennis	2012–2020	Summer	Men	0	0	2	2
Saneng Hanafi	Athletics	1976	Summer	Men	0	0	2	2

- **People in bold** are still active competitors

== Paralympics participants ==
=== Summer Paralympics ===
Sport	(Canada) 1976	(Netherlands) 1980	(United States) (United Kingdom) 1984	(South Korea) 1988	(United States) 1996	(Australia) 2000	(Greece) 2004	(China) 2008	(United Kingdom) 2012	(Brazil) 2016	(Japan) 2020	(France) 2024	Athletes
Archery	1											5	6
Athletics	12	12	8	10		3			1	2	7	5	60
Badminton	Not held										7	9	16
Boccia												4	4
Cycling	Not held										1	1	2
Judo	Not held											3	3
Lawn bowls	1	7	3			Not held							11
Powerlifting	Not held			3	1	1		1	1	2	1	3	13
Shooting				3							2	1	6
Swimming	1	3	1	1			1	1	1	4	2	3	18
Table tennis	3	6		3					1	1	3	1	18
Wheelchair tennis	Not held						2	1					3
Weightlifting		2		2	Not held								4
Total	18	29 (Note: R.S. Arlen participated in two sports namely Weightlifting and Lawn bowls.)	12	22	1	5	3	3	4	9	23	35	164
Sport	(Canada) 1976	(Netherlands) 1980	(United States) (United Kingdom) 1984	(South Korea) 1988	(United States) 1996	(Australia) 2000	(Greece) 2004	(China) 2008	(United Kingdom) 2012	(Brazil) 2016	(Japan) 2020	(France) 2024	Athletes

== Flag bearers ==
Games	Season	Flag bearer	Sport
(Italy) 1960 Rome	Summer	Did not participate	
(Japan) 1964 Tokyo	Summer	Did not participate	
(Israel) 1968 Tel Aviv	Summer	Did not participate	
(Germany) 1972 Heidelberg	Summer	Did not participate	
(Canada) 1976 Toronto	Summer	Unknown	
(Netherlands) 1980 Arnhem	Summer	Unknown	
(United States) (United Kingdom) 1984 New York/Stoke Mandeville	Summer	Unknown	
(South Korea) 1988 Seoul	Summer	Unknown	
(Spain) 1992 Barcelona/Madrid	Summer	Did not participate	
(United States) 1996 Atlanta	Summer	Unknown	
(Australia) 2000 Sydney	Summer	Unknown	
(Greece) 2004 Athens	Summer	Steven Sualang	Swimming
(China) 2008 Beijing	Summer	Billy Zeth Makal	Powerlifting
(United Kingdom) 2012 London	Summer	Agus Ngaimin	Swimming
(Brazil) 2016 Rio de Janeiro	Summer	Agus Ngaimin	Swimming
(Japan) 2020 Tokyo	Summer	Hanik Puji Astuti (Note: Jaenal Aripin originally was also chosen as the co-flagbearer. In fact, he did not carry the flag alongside Astuti at the opening ceremony.)	Shooting
(France) 2024 Paris	Summer	Fadli Immammuddin	Cycling
(France) 2024 Paris	Summer	Leli Marlina	Table tennis

== See also ==
- Olympic Games
- Paralympic Games
- Indonesia at the Deaflympics
- Indonesia at the Olympics
- Indonesia at the Youth Olympics
- List of flag bearers for Indonesia at the Olympics
