= Indonesia at the 2024 Summer Paralympics =

- IPC code: INA
- NPC: National Paralympic Committee of Indonesia
- Website: www.npcindonesia.org (in Indonesian)

in Paris, France August 28, 2024 – September 8, 2024
- Competitors: 35 in 10 sports
- Flag bearers: Fadli Immammuddin; Leli Marlina
- Medals Ranked 50th: Gold 1 Silver 8 Bronze 5 Total 14

Summer Paralympics appearances (overview)
- 1976; 1980; 1984; 1988; 1992; 1996; 2000; 2004; 2008; 2012; 2016; 2020; 2024

Indonesia competed at the 2024 Summer Paralympics in Paris, France, from 28 August to 8 September. During 2024 Summer Paralympics, Indonesia participated with the most number paralympians ever since Indonesia started to participate back in 1976. It was also the first time Indonesian judokas and boccia paralympians participated in the games, as well as its return to para-archery after 48 years.

Indonesia left Paris with fourteen medals (one gold, eight silver and five bronze), five more than previous Paralympics in Tokyo. It was the first time Indonesia secured only gold medal at the Paralympics via all Indonesian final in para-badminton mixed doubles SL3-SU5. Meanwhile, it was also the first time Indonesia clinched medals from boccia, as well as silver medal in para-athletics men's track event since 1976.

== Medalists ==
Medal	Name	Sport	Event	Date
(gold) Gold	Hikmat Ramdani; Leani Ratri Oktila	Badminton	Mixed doubles SL3–SU5	2 September
(silver) Silver	Saptoyogo Purnomo	Athletics	Men's 100 m T37	30 August
(silver) Silver	Muhammad Bintang Herlangga	Boccia	Men's individual BC2	1 September
(silver) Silver	Qonitah Ikhtiar Syakuroh	Badminton	Women's singles SL3	2 September
(silver) Silver	Fredy Setiawan; Khalimatus Sadiyah	Badminton	Mixed doubles SL3–SU5	2 September
(silver) Silver	Leani Ratri Oktila	Badminton	Women's singles SL4	2 September
(silver) Silver	Suryo Nugroho	Badminton	Men's singles SU5	2 September
(silver) Silver	Felix Ardi Yudha; Gischa Zayana; Muhamad Afrizal Syafa	Boccia	Mixed team BC1–2	5 September
(silver) Silver	Karisma Evi Tiarani	Athletics	Women's 100 m T63	7 September
(bronze) Bronze	Gischa Zayana	Boccia	Women's individual BC2	1 September
(bronze) Bronze	Muhamad Afrizal Syafa	Boccia	Men's individual BC1	1 September
(bronze) Bronze	Subhan; Rina Marlina	Badminton	Mixed doubles SH6	2 September
(bronze) Bronze	Dheva Anrimusthi	Badminton	Men's singles SU5	2 September
(bronze) Bronze	Fredy Setiawan	Badminton	Men's singles SL4	2 September

=== Summary ===
Medals by sport
Sport	1st place, gold medalist(s)	2nd place, silver medalist(s)	3rd place, bronze medalist(s)	Total
Badminton	1	4	3	8
Boccia	0	2	2	4
Athletics	0	2	0	2
Total	1	8	5	14

Medals by day
Day	Date	1st place, gold medalist(s)	2nd place, silver medalist(s)	3rd place, bronze medalist(s)	Total
2	30 August	0	1	0	1
4	1 September	0	1	2	3
5	2 September	1	4	3	8
8	5 September	0	1	0	1
10	7 September	0	1	1	2
Total		1	8	5	14

Medals by gender
Gender	1st place, gold medalist(s)	2nd place, silver medalist(s)	3rd place, bronze medalist(s)	Total
Mixed	1	2	1	4
Male	0	3	3	6
Female	0	3	1	4
Total	1	8	5	14

Multiple medalists
Name	Sport	1st place, gold medalist(s)	2nd place, silver medalist(s)	3rd place, bronze medalist(s)	Total
Leani Ratri Oktila	Badminton	1	1	0	2
Fredy Setiawan	Badminton	0	1	1	2
Gischa Zayana	Boccia	0	1	1	2
Muhamad Afrizal Syafa	Boccia	0	1	1	2

== Competitors ==
The following is the list of number of competitors in the Games.

Sport	Men	Women	Total
Archery	3	2	5
Athletics	3	2	5
Badminton	5	4	9
Boccia	3	1	4
Cycling	1	0	1
Judo	2	1	3
Powerlifting	0	3	3
Shooting	1	0	1
Swimming	2	1	3
Table tennis	0	1	1
Total	20	15	35

== Archery ==
Indonesia secured five quota places (one in men's compound, two in men's recurve, one in women's compound and one in women's recurve) by virtue of their result at the 2023 World Para Archery Championships in Plzeň, Czech Republic, 2023 Asian Championships in Bangkok, Thailand and 2024 World Qualification Tournament in Dubai, United Arab Emirates.

Men

Athlete	Event	Ranking round		Round of 32	Round of 16	Quarterfinals	Semifinals	Final / BM	
Athlete	Event	Score	Seed	Opposition Score	Opposition Score	Opposition Score	Opposition Score	Opposition Score	Rank
Ken Swagumilang	Men's individual compound	691	12	French (AUS); W 140–138	Kumar (IND); L 144–144*	Did not advance			
Kholidin	Men's individual recurve	647 =PB	3	Naumchuk (UKR); DSQ	Did not advance				
Setiawan	Men's individual recurve	592	25	Rahimi (IRI); W 6–4	Singh (IND); L 2–6	Did not advance			

Women

Athlete	Event	Ranking round		Round of 32	Round of 16	Quarterfinals	Semifinals	Final / BM	
Athlete	Event	Score	Seed	Opposition Score	Opposition Score	Opposition Score	Opposition Score	Opposition Score	Rank
Teodora Audi Ayudia Ferelly	Women's individual compound	662	17	Al-Hameed (IRQ); W 129–127	Cüre (TUR); L 128–143	Did not advance			
Wahyu Retno Wulandari	Women's individual recurve	526	17	Jennings (AUS); L 3–7	Did not advance				

Mixed

Athlete	Event	Ranking round		Round of 16	Quarterfinals	Semifinals	Final / BM	
Athlete	Event	Score	Seed	Opposition Score	Opposition Score	Opposition Score	Opposition Score	Rank
Ken Swagumilang; Teodora Audi Ayudia Ferelly	Mixed team compound	1353	9	Al-Hameed /Kadhim (IRQ); W 150–149	Kumar /Devi (IND); L 143–154	Did not advance		
Setiawan; Wahyu Retno Wulandari	Mixed team recurve	1173	9	Netsiri /Pattawaeo (THA); W 6–0	Travisani /Mijno (ITA); L 3–5	Did not advance		

== Athletics ==
Indonesian track and field athletes achieved quota places for the following events based on their results at the 2023 World Championships, 2024 World Championships, or through high performance allocation, as long as they meet the minimum entry standard (MES). An NPC can enter an eligible athlete in an unlimited number of individual medal events as long as the athlete has achieved a MES performance in each respective event.

Key

- Note–Ranks given for track events are within the athlete's heat only
- Q = Qualified for the next round
- q = Qualified for the next round as a fastest loser or, in field events, by position without achieving the qualifying target
- DQ = Disqualified
- PR = Paralympic Record
- AR = Area (or continental) Record
- NR = National Record
- SB = Season's Best
- N/A = Round not applicable for the event
- Bye = Athlete not required to compete in round

Men

Athlete	Event	Heat		Final	
Athlete	Event	Result	Rank	Result	Rank
Fauzi Purwolaksono	Javelin throw F57	—N/a		45.66 m	6
Partin Muhlisin	100 m T63	12.31	4 q	12.51	8
Saptoyogo Purnomo	100 m T37	11.35 SB	2 Q	11.26 AR	2nd place, silver medalist(s)
Saptoyogo Purnomo	200 m T37	23.41 SB	1 Q	23.26 PB	5

Women

Athlete	Event	Heat		Final	
Athlete	Event	Result	Rank	Result	Rank
Karisma Evi Tiarani	100 m T63	14.34 WR	2 Q	14.26 WR	2nd place, silver medalist(s)
Ni Made Arianti Putri	100 m T12	12.69 SB	3	Did not advance	

== Badminton ==
Indonesia qualified nine para badminton athletes to compete in the Paris 2024 Paralympic Games based on the BWF Race to Paris Paralympic Rankings.

Men

Athlete	Event	Group Stage				Semi-finals	Final / BM	
Athlete	Event	Opposition Score	Opposition Score	Opposition Score	Rank	Opposition Score	Opposition Score	Rank
Fredy Setiawan	Singles SL4	Nnanna (NGR); W (21–12, 24–22)	Adam (GER); W (21–4, 21–15)	—N/a	1 Q	Mazur (FRA); L (13–21, 8–21)	Kadam (IND); W (21–17, 21–18)	3rd place, bronze medalist(s)
Hikmat Ramdani	Singles SL4	Yathiraj (IND); L (7–21, 5–21)	Shin (KOR); W (21–15, 16–21, 21–15)	—N/a	2	Did not advance		
Dheva Anrimusthi	Singles SU5	Imai (JPN); W (21–18, 21–14)	Anuar (MAS); L (21–14, 19–21, 19–21)	Fang (TPE); W (21–14, 21–18)	2 Q	Cheah (MAS); L (17–21, 17–21)	Anuar (MAS); W (17–21, 21–19, 21–12)	3rd place, bronze medalist(s)
Suryo Nugroho	Singles SU5	Loquette (FRA); W (21–13, 21–13)	Mróz (POL); W (21–13, 21–10)	Cheah (MAS); L (10–21, 13–21)	2 Q	Anuar (MAS); W (21–12, 14–21, 21–6)	Cheah (MAS); L (13–21, 15–21)	2nd place, silver medalist(s)
Subhan	Singles SH6	Solaimalai (IND); W (21–15, 21–17)	Coombs (GBR); L (15–21, 21–17, 18–21)	Chu (HKG); L (13–21, 13–21)	3	Did not advance		

Women

Athlete	Event	Group Stage				Quarter-finals	Semi-finals	Final / BM	
Athlete	Event	Opposition Score	Opposition Score	Opposition Score	Rank	Opposition Score	Opposition Score	Opposition Score	Rank
Qonitah Ikhtiar Syakuroh	Singles SL3	Joshi (IND); W (16–21, 21–13, 21–18)	Kozyna (UKR); W (21–5, 21–14)	—N/a	1 Q	—N/a	Kozyna (UKR); W (21–13, 21–3)	Xiao (CHN); L (14–21, 20–22)	2nd place, silver medalist(s)
Khalimatus Sadiyah	Singles SL4	Cheng (CHN); L (12–21, 15–21)	Noël (FRA); W (21–9, 21–12)	—N/a	2 Q	Kohli (IND); W (21–19, 21–15)	Oktila (INA); L (14–21, 12–21)	Sagøy (NOR); L (10–21, 14–21)	4
Leani Ratri Oktila	Singles SL4	Kohli (IND); W (18–21, 21–5, 21–13)	Surreau (FRA); W (21–9, 21–10)	—N/a	1 Q	—N/a	Sadiyah (INA); W (21–14, 21–12)	Cheng (CHN); L (14–21, 18–21)	2nd place, silver medalist(s)
Rina Marlina	Singles SH6	Póveda (PER); W (19–21, 21–17, 21–14)	Li (CHN); L (10–21, 16–21)	Saeyang (THA); W (21–8, 21–12)	2 Q	Choong (GBR); W (21–7, 21–11)	Li (CHN); L (8–21, 4–21)	Sivan (IND); L (14–21, 6–21)	4

Mixed

Athlete	Event	Group Stage				Semi-finals	Final / BM	
Athlete	Event	Opposition Score	Opposition Score	Opposition Score	Rank	Opposition Score	Opposition Score	Rank
Hikmat Ramdani; Leani Ratri Oktila	Doubles SL3–SU5	Mazur / Noël (FRA); W (21–11, 21–12)	Nitesh / Murugesan (IND); W (21–15, 21–8)	Yathiraj / Kohli (IND); W (21–11, 21–17)	1 Q	Teamarrom / Seansupa (THA); W (21–12, 21–8)	Setiawan / Sadiyah (INA); W (21–16, 21–15)	1st place, gold medalist(s)
Fredy Setiawan; Khalimatus Sadiyah	Doubles SL3–SU5	Imai / Ito (JPN); W (21–12, 25–23)	Teamarrom / Seansupa (THA); W (21–5, 21–17)	Yang JY / Yang QX (CHN); W (23–21, 21–16)	1 Q	Mazur / Noël (FRA); W (21–15, 21–15)	Ramdani / Oktila (INA); L (16–21, 15–21)	2nd place, silver medalist(s)
Subhan; Rina Marlina	Doubles SH6	Shephard / Choong (GBR); W (21–14, 21–12)	Lin / Li (CHN); W (19–21, 21–12, 21–15)	—N/a	1 Q	Lin / Li (CHN); L (21–17, 16–21, 19–21)	Solaimalai / Sivan (IND); W (21–17, 21–12)	3rd place, bronze medalist(s)

== Boccia ==
For the first time, Indonesia entered four boccia athletes to compete at Paris 2024. Three athletes secured the quotas, following the triumph of winning the silver medal in the BC1/BC2 Teams event at the 2024 World Boccia Paralympic Qualification Tournament in Coimbra, Portugal; meanwhile Muhammad Bintang Satria Herlangga qualified for the games by received the bipartite commission invitation allocation quota.

Individual

Athletes	Events	Pool matches				Playoffs	Quarterfinals	Semifinals	Final / BM	
Athletes	Events	Opposition Score	Opposition Score	Opposition Score	Rank	Opposition Score	Opposition Score	Opposition Score	Opposition Score	Rank
Muhamad Afrizal Syafa	Men's individual BC1	Král (SVK); W 5–3	Kim D-h (KOR); W 7–4	—N/a	1 Q	—N/a	Perez (NED); W 10–0	Loung (HKG); L 3–4	Smith (GBR); W 5–3	3rd place, bronze medalist(s)
Felix Ardi Yudha	Men's individual BC2	Yan (CHN); W 5–2	Allard (CAN); W 11–1	Hirose (JPN); W 5–2	1 Q	Bye	Herlangga (INA); L 2–3	Did not advance		7
Muhammad Bintang Herlangga	Men's individual BC2	Lee (MAS); W 11–2	Lan (CHN); W 9–1	Sugimura (JPN); W 3–2	1 Q	Rombouts (BEL); W 7–1	Yudha (INA); W 3–2	Mezík (SVK); W 6–1	Saengampa (THA); L 1–6	2nd place, silver medalist(s)
Gischa Zayana	Women's individual BC2	Nagy (HUN); W 6–1	van Engelen (NED); W 9–1	—N/a	1 Q	—N/a	Haggo (GBR); W 8–2	Gonçalves (POR); L 3–7	Taggart (GBR); W 5–2	3rd place, bronze medalist(s)

Team

Athletes	Event	Pool matches			Quarterfinals	Semifinals	Final / BM	
Athletes	Event	Opposition Score	Opposition Score	Rank	Opposition Score	Opposition Score	Opposition Score	Rank
Muhamad Afrizal Syafa; Felix Ardi Yudha; Gischa Zayana	Mixed team BC1–2	France; W 8–3	Netherlands; W 9–3	1 Q	Great Britain; W 7*–7	Japan; W 9–0	China; L 6–7	2nd place, silver medalist(s)

== Cycling ==
Indonesia entered one male para-cyclist after finished the top eligible nation's at the 2022 UCI Nation's ranking allocation ranking, and Fadli Immammuddin had been chosen to represent Indonesia in this event.

Road

Athlete	Event	Time	Rank
Fadli Immammuddin	Men's time trial C4	43:29.58	12
Fadli Immammuddin	Men's road race C4-5	-1 LAP	22

Track

Athlete	Event	Qualification		Final	
Athlete	Event	Time	Rank	Opposition Time	Rank
Fadli Immammuddin	Men's individual pursuit C4	4:51.817	10	Did not advance	

== Judo ==
Indonesia qualified two judokas via the IBSA Judo Paralympic Ranking; marking the nation's first appearance in judo at the Paralympics. An additional quota was granted to Roma Siska via bipartite commission invitation.

Athlete	Event	Quarterfinals	Semifinals	Repechage	Final / BM	
Athlete	Event	Opposition Result	Opposition Result	Opposition Result	Opposition Result	Rank
Junaedi	Men's −60 kg J1	Vieira (POR); W 10−0	Bouamer (ALG); L 0−1	—N/a	Blanco (VEN); L 0−10	=5
Tony Ricardo Mantolas	Men's +90 kg J2	Chikoidze (GEO); L 0−10	—N/a	Fernandes Jr (BRA); W 10−0	Skelley (GBR); L 0−10	=5
Roma Siska Tampubolon	Women's +70 kg J1	Garcia (USA); L 0−10	—N/a	Ergasheva (UZB); L 0−10	Did not advance	7

== Powerlifting ==
Indonesia entered three athletes into the Paralympic competition; three-time Paralympian and Tokyo 2020 silver medalist Ni Nengah Widiasih (women's 41 kg), Rio 2016 Paralympian Siti Mahmudah (women's 79 kg), and Paralympic debutant Sriyanti (women's +86 kg). They secured one of the top eight slots in their respective weight divisions based on the World Para Powerlifting Paralympic Ranking.

Athlete	Event	Total lifted	Rank
Ni Nengah Widiasih	Women's −41 kg	101	5
Siti Mahmudah	Women's −79 kg	125	8
Sriyanti	Women's +86 kg	138	4

== Shooting ==
Indonesia entered one para-shooters after achieved quota places for the following events by virtue of their best finishes at the 2022, 2023 and 2024 world cup, 2022 World Championships, 2023 World Championships and 2022 Asian Para Games, as long as they obtained a minimum qualifying score (MQS) by July 15, 2024.

Athlete	Event	Qualification		Final	
Athlete	Event	Score	Rank	Score	Rank
Bolo Triyanto	R5 – Mixed 10 m air rifle prone SH2	631.2	26	Did not advance	

== Swimming ==
Three Indonesian swimmers have qualified through the Minimum Qualification Standard (MQS) allocation slots.

Men

Athlete	Events	Heats		Final	
Athlete	Events	Time	Rank	Time	Rank
Jendi Pangabean	100 m backstroke S9	1:06.35	5 R	Did not advance	
Maulana Rifky Yavianda	100 m backstroke S12	1:04.23	7 Q	1:03.86	7
Maulana Rifky Yavianda	100 m freestyle S12	55.65	5 R	Did not advance	

Women

Athlete	Events	Heats		Final	
Athlete	Events	Time	Rank	Time	Rank
Syuci Indriani	100 m butterfly S14	1:09.71	4 Q	1:10.41	8

== Table tennis ==
Indonesia entered one para table tennis player to compete at the Paralympic. Leli Marlina secured a quota for herself by received the bipartite commission invitation allocation quotas.

Athlete	Event	Quarterfinals	Semifinals	Final	
Athlete	Event	Opposition Result	Opposition Result	Opposition Result	Rank
Leli Marlina	Women's individual C5	Zhang (CHN); L 0–3	Did not advance		

== See also ==
- Indonesia at the 2024 Summer Olympics
- Indonesia at the Paralympics
