= Saudi Arabia at the Paralympics =

- IPC code: KSA
- NPC: Paralympic Committee of Saudi Arabia
- Medals: Gold 2 Silver 2 Bronze 2 Total 6

Summer appearances
- 1996; 2000; 2004; 2008; 2012; 2016; 2020; 2024

Saudi Arabia made its Paralympic Games début at the 1996 Summer Paralympics in Atlanta, with two competitors in powerlifting. The country has participated in every subsequent edition of the Summer Paralympics, but has never entered the Winter Paralympics but the nation first participated in the Winter Olympics in Beijing 2022 with Fayik Abdi who took part in Alpine skiing. All Saudis have competed in athletics or powerlifting.

Saudi Arabia has won a total of six medals in Paralympic history. Two of these were secured by Osamah Al-Shanqiti in Beijing 2008, marking him as the Kingdom's first Paralympic champion. Al-shanqiti claimed gold in the triple jump, F12 category, setting a world record with a distance of 15.37m. His second medal was a silver in the long jump, where he achieved 7.06m, finishing behind South Africa's Hilton Langenhoven (7.31m). Hani Alnakhli contributed two more medals: a silver in the men’s discus throw, F32/33/34, at London 2012, and a bronze in the same event, F33 category, at Rio 2016. Abdulrahman Al-Qurashi add a bronze in the men’s 400m T53 in 2020 Tokyo finishing with a time of 14.86 seconds, In the Paris 2024 Paralympics, he added to the tally with a gold in the men’s 100m T53 wheelchair race, finishing with a time of 14.86 seconds.

== Medal tables ==
=== Medals by Summer Games ===
Games	Athletes	Gold	Silver	Bronze	Total	Rank
1996 Atlanta	2	0	0	0	0	–
2000 Sydney	4	0	0	0	0	–
2004 Athens	6	0	0	0	0	–
2008 Beijing	3	1	1	0	2	48
2012 London	4	0	1	0	1	67
2016 Rio de Janeiro	3	0	0	1	1	76
2020 Tokyo	7	0	0	1	1	78
2024 Paris	9	1	0	0	1	65
Total		2	2	2	6	99

=== Medals by Summer sport ===
Sport	Gold	Silver	Bronze	Total
Athletics	2	2	2	6
Totals (1 entries)	2	2	2	6

== Medalists ==
Medal	Name	Games	Sport	Event
Gold	Osamah Alshanqiti	(China) 2008 Beijing	Athletics	Men's triple jump F12
Silver	Osamah Alshanqiti	(China) 2008 Beijing	Athletics	Men's long jump F12
Silver	Hani Alnakhli	(United Kingdom) 2012 London	Athletics	Men's discus throw F32-34
Bronze	Hani Alnakhli	(Brazil) 2016 Rio de Janeiro	Athletics	Men's shot put F33
Bronze	Abdulrahman Al-Qurashi	(Japan) 2020 Tokyo	Athletics	Men's 100 metres T53
Gold	Abdulrahman Al-Qurashi	(France) 2024 Paris	Athletics	Men's 100 metres T53

== See also ==
- Saudi Arabia at the Olympics
- Saudi Arabia at the Deaflympics
