= Indonesia at the 2016 Summer Paralympics =

- IPC code: INA
- NPC: National Paralympic Committee of Indonesia
- Website: www.npcindonesia.org (in Indonesian)

in Rio de Janeiro
- Competitors: 9 in 4 sports
- Flag bearer: Agus Ngaimin
- Medals Ranked 76th: Gold 0 Silver 0 Bronze 1 Total 1

Summer Paralympics appearances (overview)
- 1976; 1980; 1984; 1988; 1992; 1996; 2000; 2004; 2008; 2012; 2016; 2020; 2024

Indonesia competed at the 2016 Summer Paralympics in Rio de Janeiro, Brazil, from 7 to 18 September 2016.

== Disability classifications ==
Every participant at the Paralympics has their disability grouped into one of five disability categories; amputation, the condition may be congenital or sustained through injury or illness; cerebral palsy; wheelchair athletes, there is often overlap between this and other categories; visual impairment, including blindness; Les autres, any physical disability that does not fall strictly under one of the other categories, for example dwarfism or multiple sclerosis. Each Paralympic sport then has its own classifications, dependent upon the specific physical demands of competition. Events are given a code, made of numbers and letters, describing the type of event and classification of the athletes competing. Some sports, such as athletics, divide athletes by both the category and severity of their disabilities, other sports, for example swimming, group competitors from different categories together, the only separation being based on the severity of the disability.

== Medallists ==
Medal	Name	Sport	Event	Date
Bronze	Ni Nengah Widiasih	Powerlifting	Women's 41 kg	9 September

== Athletics ==
Men's Track Events

Athlete	Events	Heat		Semifinal		Final	
Athlete	Events	Time	Rank	Time	Rank	Time	Rank
Setiyo Budi Hartanto	100 m T47	11.56	6	Did not advance			
Abdul Halim Dalimunte; Guide: Emanuel Permana Anjar	100 m T11	11.62	1 Q	11.58	3	Did not advance	
Abdul Halim Dalimunte; Guide: Emanuel Permana Anjar	200 m T11	24.66	4	Did not advance			

Men's Field Events

Athlete	Event	Distance	Rank
Setiyo Budi Hartanto	Long Jump F47	6.95	6

== Powerlifting ==
Women

Athlete	Event	Result	Rank
Ni Nengah Widiasih	-41kg	95	3rd place, bronze medalist(s)
Siti Mahmudah	-79kg	115	5

== Swimming ==
Indonesia has qualified 4 swimmers according to NPC official.

Men

Athlete	Events	Heats		Final	
Athlete	Events	Time	Rank	Time	Rank
Agus Ngaimin	50 m freestyle S6	35.50	22	Did not advance	
Agus Ngaimin	100 m freestyle S6	1:21.21	18	Did not advance	
Agus Ngaimin	400 m freestyle S6	6:42.71	11	Did not advance	
Agus Ngaimin	50 m butterfly S6	DNS	-	Did not advance	
Agus Ngaimin	100 m backstroke S6	1:27.73	11	Did not advance	
Jendi Pangabean	100 m backstroke S9	1:08.28	12	Did not advance	
Marinus Melianus Yowei	50 m freestyle S13	26.57	17	Did not advance	
Marinus Melianus Yowei	100 m breaststroke SB13	1:14.39	9	Did not advance	

Women

Athlete	Events	Heats		Final	
Athlete	Events	Time	Rank	Time	Rank
Syuci Indriani	200 m freestyle S14	2:24.63	9	Did not advance	
Syuci Indriani	100 m breaststroke SB14	1:24.07	8 Q	1:24.24	8
Syuci Indriani	200 m freestyle SM14	2:38.26	6 Q	2:40.64	7

== Table tennis ==
Men

Athlete	Event	Group stage			Round 1	Quarterfinals	Semifinals	Final	
Athlete	Event	Opposition Result	Opposition Result	Rank	Opposition Result	Opposition Result	Opposition Result	Opposition Result	Rank
David Jacobs	Individual C10	Hergelink (NED); W 3–0	Daybell (GBR); L 2–3	2 Q	Boheas (FRA); L 2–3	Did not advance			

== See also ==
- Indonesia at the 2016 Summer Olympics
