= Indonesia at the 2020 Summer Paralympics =

- IPC code: INA
- NPC: National Paralympic Committee of Indonesia
- Website: www.npcindonesia.org (in Indonesian)

in Tokyo
- Competitors: 23 in 7 sports
- Flag bearer (opening): Hanik Puji Astuti (Note: Jaenal Aripin originally was also chosen as the co-flagbearer. In fact, Aripin did not carry the flag alongside Astuti at the opening ceremony, however, later he become the flagbearer at the closing ceremony.)
- Flag bearer (closing): Jaenal Aripin
- Medals Ranked 43rd: Gold 2 Silver 3 Bronze 4 Total 9

Summer Paralympics appearances (overview)
- 1976; 1980; 1984; 1988; 1992; 1996; 2000; 2004; 2008; 2012; 2016; 2020; 2024

Indonesia competed at the 2020 Summer Paralympics in Tokyo, Japan. Originally scheduled to take place in 2020, the Games were rescheduled for 24 August to 5 September 2021, due to the COVID-19 pandemic.

The National Paralympic Committee of Indonesia confirmed a team of 23 athletes; the second largest delegation after 1980. It consisted of 14 men and 9 women, they will competing in seven sports. In this editions, Indonesia made its Paralympic debut in para-badminton (as new sport) and para-cycling. Also, it was return to shooting para sport after 33 years, including female para-shooter Hanik Puji Astuti, who became the nation's de facto flag bearer at the opening ceremony.

The Indonesian roster featured five returning paralympians: one-time paralympian Jendi Pangabean and Syuci Indriani in swimming, two-time paralympian Setyo Budi Hartanto in men's long jump T47 athletics, David Jacobs in the men's singles C-10 table tennis, and Ni Nengah Widiasih in the women's 41 kg powerlifting; the last two of whom were won bronze at the 2012 and 2016 Games, respectively.

Indonesia left Tokyo with nine medals; two gold, three silver and four bronze, improving its total medal tally and significantly rank from previous Games. It was the first Indonesians won all kind medals since the last time at year was the country's debut, as well as the best ever in the Paralympics. Leani Ratri Oktila, with her partners Khalimatus Sadiyah and Hary Susanto, became the Paralympic champions with two gold medals, each in women's doubles SL3-SU5 and mixed doubles SL3-SU5; the first time in 41 years. She was also won silver in women's singles SL4, make her as Indonesia's most successful paralympian.

== Medalists ==
Medal	Name	Sport	Event	Date
Gold	Leani Ratri Oktila; Khalimatus Sadiyah	Badminton	Women's doubles SL3–SU5	4 September
Gold	Hary Susanto; Leani Ratri Oktila	Badminton	Mixed doubles SL3–SU5	5 September
Silver	Ni Nengah Widiasih	Powerlifting	Women's 41 kg	26 August
Silver	Dheva Anrimusthi	Badminton	Men's singles SU5	4 September
Silver	Leani Ratri Oktila	Badminton	Women's singles SL4	5 September
Bronze	Saptoyoga Purnomo	Athletics	Men's 100 metres T37	27 August
Bronze	David Jacobs	Table tennis	Men's individual class 10	28 August
Bronze	Suryo Nugroho	Badminton	Men's singles SU5	4 September
Bronze	Fredy Setiawan	Badminton	Men's singles SL4	5 September

Medals by sport
Sport	1st place, gold medalist(s)	2nd place, silver medalist(s)	3rd place, bronze medalist(s)	Total
Athletics	0	0	1	1
Badminton	2	2	2	6
Powerlifting	0	1	0	1
Table tennis	0	0	1	1
Total	2	3	4	9

Medals by date
Date	1st place, gold medalist(s)	2nd place, silver medalist(s)	3rd place, bronze medalist(s)	Total
26 August	0	1	0	1
27 August	0	0	1	1
28 August	0	0	1	1
4 September	1	1	1	3
5 September	1	1	1	3
Total	2	3	4	9

Medals by gender^{(Comparison graphs)}
Gender	1st place, gold medalist(s)	2nd place, silver medalist(s)	3rd place, bronze medalist(s)	Total	Percentage
Female	1	2	0	3	33.3%
Male	0	1	4	5	55.6%
Mixed	1	0	0	1	11.1%
Total	2	3	4	9	100%

== Competitors ==
Sport	Men	Women	Total	Events
Athletics	3	4	7	11
Badminton	5	2	7	9
Cycling	1	0	1	2
Powerlifting	0	1	1	1
Shooting	1	1	2	3
Swimming	1	1	2	4
Table tennis	3	0	3	4
Total	14	9	23	34

== Athletics ==
Indonesian athlete successfully to break through the qualifications for the 2020 Paralympics after breaking the qualification limit.

Key

- Note–Ranks given for track events are within the athlete's heat only
- Q = Qualified for the next round
- q = Qualified for the next round as a fastest loser or, in field events, by position without achieving the qualifying target
- DQ = Disqualified
- PR = Paralympic Record
- AR = Area (or continental) Record
- NR = National Record
- SB = Season's Best
- N/A = Round not applicable for the event
- Bye = Athlete not required to compete in round

Number	Athlete	Event	Heats		Final	
Number	Athlete	Event	Result	Rank	Result	Rank
Men's Track
1	Saptoyoga Purnomo	100 m T37	11.33	1 Q	11.31 AR	3rd place, bronze medalist(s)
1	Saptoyoga Purnomo	200 m T37	23.41 PB	3 Q	23.27 PB	6
2	Jaenal Aripin	100 m T54	14.53	4	did not advance	
2	Jaenal Aripin	400 m T54	–	DQ	did not advance	
Men's Field
3	Setyo Budi Hartanto	Long jump T47	—N/a		6.47 SB	10
Women's Track
4	Putri Aulia	100 m T13	12.55	3	did not advance	
5	Karisma Evi Tiarani	100 m T63	14.83 SB	2 Q	14.83 PR	4
6	Elvin Elhudia Sesa	400 m T20	1:04.34	5	did not advance	
Women's Field
7	Famini	Discus throw F57	—N/a		21.13 SB	12
Mixed Track
—	Putri Aulia; Karisma Evi Tiarani; Saptoyoga Purnomo; Jaenal Aripin	4 × 100 m metres relay	50.55	4	did not advance	

== Badminton ==
Men

Athlete	Event	Group Stage				Semifinal	Final / BM	
Athlete	Event	Opposition Score	Opposition Score	Opposition Score	Rank	Opposition Score	Opposition Score	Rank
Ukun Rukaendi	Singles SL3	Fujihara (JPN); L (5–21, 18–21)	Bethell (GBR); L (8–21, 12–21)	—N/a	3	Did not advance		
Fredy Setiawan	Singles SL4	Shin (KOR); W (21–8, 21–9)	Teamarrom (THA); W (21–17, 21–11)	Dhillon (IND); W (21–19, 21–9)	1 Q	Lalinakere Yathiraj (IND); L (9–21, 15–21)	Dhillon (IND); W (21–17, 21–11)	3rd place, bronze medalist(s)
Hary Susanto	Singles SL4	Mazur (FRA); L (3–21, 7–21)	Lalinakere Yathiraj (IND); L (6–21, 12–21)	Pott (GER); L (15–21, 21–23)	4	Did not advance		
Dheva Anrimusthi	Singles SU5	Nugroho (INA); W (21–7, 21–7)	Loquette (FRA); W (21–10, 21–10)	Mróz (POL); W (21–17, 21–7)	1 Q	Nugroho (INA); W (21–13, 21–15)	Cheah (MAS); L (17–21, 15–21)	2nd place, silver medalist(s)
Suryo Nugroho	Singles SU5	Anrimusthi (INA); L (7–21, 7–21)	Mróz (POL); W (21–13, 21–10)	Loquette (FRA); W (21–14, 21–8)	2 Q	Anrimusthi (INA); L (13–21, 15–21)	Fang (TPE); W (21–16, 21–9)	3rd place, bronze medalist(s)

Women

Athlete	Event	Group Stage			Semifinal	Final / BM	
Athlete	Event	Opposition Score	Opposition Score	Rank	Opposition Score	Opposition Score	Rank
Leani Ratri Oktila	Singles SL4	Sadiyah (INA); W (21–14, 21–10)	Noël (FRA); W (21–12, 21–6)	1 Q	Ma (CHN); W (21–12, 21–7)	Cheng (CHN); L (19–21, 21–17, 16–21)	2nd place, silver medalist(s)
Khalimatus Sadiyah	Singles SL4	Oktila (INA); L (14–21, 10–21)	Noël (FRA); W (21–18, 21–13)	2	Did not advance		
Leani Ratri Oktila; Khalimatus Sadiyah	Doubles SL3–SU5	Saensupa / Srinavakul (THA); W (21–9, 21–13)	Ito / Suzuki (JPN); W (21–4, 21–8)	1 Q	Morin / Noël (FRA); W (21–9, 21–15)	Cheng / Ma (CHN); W (21–18, 21–12)	1st place, gold medalist(s)

Mixed

Athlete	Event	Group Stage			Semifinal	Final / BM	
Athlete	Event	Opposition Score	Opposition Score	Rank	Opposition Score	Opposition Score	Rank
Hary Susanto; Leani Ratri Oktila	Doubles SL3–SU5	Fujihara / Sugino (JPN); W (21–12, 21–11)	Pott / Seibert (GER); W (21–7, 21–17)	1 Q	Bhagat / Kohli (IND); W (21–3, 21–15)	Mazur / Noël (FRA); W (23–21, 21–17)	1st place, gold medalist(s)

== Cycling ==
Track
Men's

Athlete	Event	Qualification		Final	
Athlete	Event	Time	Rank	Opposition Time	Rank
Fadli Immammuddin	1000 m Time trial C4–5	—N/a		1:10.423	17
Fadli Immammuddin	Individual pursuit C4	4:50.393	6	did not advance	

== Powerlifting ==
Women's

Athlete	Event	Result	Rank
Ni Nengah Widiasih	–41kg	98	2nd place, silver medalist(s)

== Shooting ==
Indonesia entered two athletes into the Paralympic competition. Hanik Puji Astuti & Bolo Triyanto successfully break the Paralympic qualification at the 2019 WSPS World Championships which was held in Sydney, Australia.

Athlete	Event	Qualification		Final	
Athlete	Event	Score	Rank	Score	Rank
Hanik Puji Astuti	Women's R2 – 10 m air rifle standing SH1	614.5	13	did not advance	
Bolo Triyanto	Mixed R4 – 10 m air rifle standing SH2	620.9	24	did not advance	
Bolo Triyanto	Mixed R5 – 10 m air rifle prone SH2	631.0	24	did not advance	

== Swimming ==
Jendi Pangabean has successfully entered the paralympic slot after breaking the MQS.

Men

Athlete	Events	Heats		Final	
Athlete	Events	Time	Rank	Time	Rank
Jendi Pangabean	100 m backstroke S9	1:07.10	9	did not advance	

Women

Athlete	Events	Heats		Final	
Athlete	Events	Time	Rank	Time	Rank
Syuci Indriani	100 m breaststroke SB14	1:24.06	10	did not advance	
Syuci Indriani	100 m butterfly S14	1:12.13	13	did not advance	
Syuci Indriani	200 m individual medley SM14	2:40.46	13	did not advance	

== Table tennis ==
Indonesia entered three athletes into the table tennis competition at the games. Two athletes compete in men's individual class 10, Komet Akbar qualified by winning the gold medal at the 2019 ITTF Asian Para Championships in Taichung, Taiwan and David Jacobs qualified after placing first at World Ranking, while other athletes, Adyos Astan qualified by received the bipartite commission invitation allocation quotas.

Men

Athlete	Event	Group Stage			Round of 16	Quarterfinals	Semifinals	Final	
Athlete	Event	Opposition Result	Opposition Result	Rank	Opposition Result	Opposition Result	Opposition Result	Opposition Result	Rank
Adyos Astan	Individual C4	Öztürk (TUR); L 1–3	Lis (POL); W 3–1	2 Q	Saleh (EGY); L 2–3	did not advance			
Komet Akbar	Individual C10	Chojnowski (POL); L 0–3	de la Bourdonnaye (FRA); W 3–2	2 Q	—N/a	Bohéas (FRA); L 1–3	did not advance		
David Jacobs	Individual C10	Bakic (MNE); W 3–0	Reyes (ESP); W 3–0	1 Q	—N/a	Lian (CHN); W 3–2	Bohéas (FRA); L 2–3	Did not advance	3rd place, bronze medalist(s)

Men's team

Athlete	Event	Round of 16	Quarterfinals	Semifinals	Final	
Athlete	Event	Opposition Result	Opposition Result	Opposition Result	Opposition Result	Rank
Komet Akbar; David Jacobs	Team C9–10	China (CHN); L 0–2	did not advance			

== See also ==
- 2020 Paralympic Games
- 2020 Olympic Games
- Indonesia at the Paralympics
- Indonesia at the Olympics
- Indonesia at the 2020 Summer Olympics
