= Indonesia at the 2012 Summer Paralympics =

- IPC code: INA
- NPC: National Paralympic Committee of Indonesia
- Website: www.npcindonesia.org (in Indonesian)

in London
- Competitors: 4 in 4 sports
- Flag bearer: Agus Ngaimin
- Medals Ranked 74th: Gold 0 Silver 0 Bronze 1 Total 1

Summer Paralympics appearances (overview)
- 1976; 1980; 1984; 1988; 1992; 1996; 2000; 2004; 2008; 2012; 2016; 2020; 2024

Indonesia competed at the 2012 Summer Paralympics in London, United Kingdom, from August 29 to September 9.

For its ninth participation in the Paralympic Games, the country fielded a delegation of four athletes in four different sports.

== Medallists ==
Medal	Name	Sport	Event	Date
Bronze	David Jacobs	Table Tennis	Men's Individual C10	2 September

== Athletics ==
Setiyo Budi Hartanto (a left forearm amputee) competed in the men's long jump and triple jump F46 (a category for athletes with disabilities affecting the upper limbs or the torso).

Men’s Field Events

Athlete	Event	Distance	Rank
Setiyo Budi Hartanto	Long Jump F46	6.44	5
Setiyo Budi Hartanto	Triple Jump F46	13.41	7

== Powerlifting ==
Ni Nengah Widiasih competed in the women's under 40kg event.

Women

Athlete	Event	Result	Rank
Ni Nengah Widiasih	-40kg	78	5

== Swimming ==
Agus Ngaimin (who is paralysed from the waist down) competed in the men's 100m backstroke S6.

Men

Athletes	Event	Heat		Final	
Athletes	Event	Time	Rank	Time	Rank
Agus Ngaimin	100m backstroke S6	DNS		did not advance	

== Table tennis ==
David Jacobs competed in the men's singles, class 10 (a category for standing players with a comparatively low level of disability).

Men

Athlete	Event	Group Stage		Quarterfinals	Semifinals	Final / BM	
Athlete	Event	Opposition Result	Rank	Opposition Result	Opposition Result	Opposition Result	Rank
David Jacobs	Individual C10	Bye		Lü (CHN); W 3-1	Ge (CHN); L 1-3	Ruiz (ESP); W 3-1	3rd place, bronze medalist(s)

== See also ==
- Summer Paralympic disability classification
- Indonesia at the Paralympics
- Indonesia at the 2012 Summer Olympics
