= Athletics at the 2024 Summer Paralympics – Men's 400 metres T53 =

Men's 400 metres T53 at the XVII Paralympic Games
- Venue: Stade de France
- Dates: 1 September 2024
- Competitors: 10 from 8 nations
- Winning time: 46.77

Medalists
1st place, gold medalist(s)		Pongsakorn Paeyo	Thailand
2nd place, silver medalist(s)		Brent Lakatos	Canada
3rd place, bronze medalist(s)		Brian Siemann	United States

400 metres at the 2024 Summer Paralympics
Men · T11 · T12 · T13 · T20 · T36 · T37 · T38 · T47 · T52 · T53 · T54 · T62
Women · T11 · T12 · T13 · T20 · T37 · T38 · T47 · T53 · T54 ·

The men's 400 metres T53 event at the 2024 Summer Paralympics in Paris, will take place on 2024.

The T53 category is for wheelchair athletes with normal use of arms and hands, no or limited trunk function, and no leg function.

== Records ==
Prior to the competition, the existing records were as follows:

World Record	Pongsakorn Paeyo (THA)	46.11	(France) Paris	11 July 2023
Paralympic Record	Pongsakorn Paeyo (THA)	46.61	(Japan) Tokyo	29 August 2021

Area	Time	Athlete	Location	Date
Africa				
America				
Asia				
Europe				
Oceania				

== Results ==
=== Round 1 ===
First 3 in each heat (Q) and the next 2 fastest (q) advance to the Final.

==== Heat 1 ====
Rank	Lane	Athlete	Nation	Time	Notes
1	7	Pongsakorn Paeyo	Thailand	46.67	Q, SB
2	3	Pichet Krungget	Thailand	48.90	Q
3	4	Abdulrahman Al-Qurashi	Saudi Arabia	48.96	Q, PB
4	6	Pierre Fairbank	France	49.10	q, SB
5	5	Ariosvaldo Fernandes	Brazil	51.35	q, SB

==== Heat 2 ====
Rank	Lane	Athlete	Nation	Time	Notes
1	4	Brent Lakatos	Canada	49.04	Q, SB
2	3	Brian Siemann	United States	49.16	Q
3	5	Masaberee Arsae	Thailand	51.03	Q
4	7	Byunghoon Yoo	South Korea	51.38	
5	6	Mohamed Khelifi	Tunisia	52.01	q, SB

=== Final ===
Rank	Lane	Athlete	Nation	Time	Notes
1st place, gold medalist(s)	5	Pongsakorn Paeyo	Thailand	46.77	
2nd place, silver medalist(s)	8	Brent Lakatos	Canada	47.24	SB
3rd place, bronze medalist(s)	6	Brian Siemann	United States	47.84	PB
4	7	Pichet Krungget	Thailand	48.62	
5	4	Abdulrahman Al-Qurashi	Saudi Arabia	49.38	
6	3	Pierre Fairbank	France	50.37	
7	9	Masaberee Arsae	Thailand	50.45	
8	2	Ariosvaldo Fernandes	Brazil	52.42	
