= Athletics at the 2016 Summer Paralympics – Men's 100 metres T53 =

Men's 100 metres T53 at the XV Paralympic Games
- Venue: Estádio Olímpico João Havelange
- Dates: 9–9 September 2016
- Competitors: 17 from 10 nations

Medalists
1st place, gold medalist(s)		Brent Lakatos	Canada
2nd place, silver medalist(s)		Pongsakorn Paeyo	Thailand
3rd place, bronze medalist(s)		Huzhao Li	China

The T53 category is for wheelchair athletes with normal use of arms and hands, no or limited trunk function, and no leg function.

The Athletics at the 2016 Summer Paralympics – Men's 100 metres T53 event at the 2016 Paralympic Games took place on 9–9 September 2016, at the Estádio Olímpico João Havelange.

== Heats ==
=== Heat 1 ===
10:00 9 September 2016:

Rank	Lane	Bib	Name	Nationality	Reaction	Time	Notes
1	8	1166	Ariosvaldo Fernandes Silva	Brazil		14.69	Q
2	3	1501	Mickey Bushell	Great Britain		15.04	Q
3	6	2375	Brian Siemann	United States		15.05	q
4	7	1271	Yufei Zhao	China		15.17	
5	4	2230	Pichet Krungget	Thailand		15.83	
6	5	1209	Jean-Philippe Maranda	Canada		16.02	

=== Heat 2 ===
10:07 9 September 2016:

Rank	Lane	Bib	Name	Nationality	Reaction	Time	Notes
1	6	2232	Pongsakorn Paeyo	Thailand		14.56	Q
2	5	1786	Fahad Alganaidl	Saudi Arabia		15.08	Q
3	7	1268	Shiran Yu	China		15.24	
4	3	1509	Moatez Jomni	Great Britain		15.64	
5	8	1780	Byung Hoon Yoo	South Korea		15.86	
6	4	1470	Nicolas Brignone	France		15.97	

=== Heat 3 ===
10:14 9 September 2016:

Rank	Lane	Bib	Name	Nationality	Reaction	Time	Notes
1	3	1208	Brent Lakatos	Canada		14.43	Q
2	7	1472	Pierre Fairbank	France		14.92	Q
3	4	1249	Huzhao Li	China		14.97	q
4	6	1778	Dong Ho Jung	South Korea		15.76	
5	5	1794	Hamad Aladwani	Kuwait		15.97	

== Final ==
19:22 9 September 2016:

Rank	Lane	Bib	Name	Nationality	Reaction	Time	Notes
1st place, gold medalist(s)	3	1208	Brent Lakatos	Canada		14.44	
2nd place, silver medalist(s)	6	2232	Pongsakorn Paeyo	Thailand		14.80	
3rd place, bronze medalist(s)	2	1249	Huzhao Li	China		14.85	
4	5	1166	Ariosvaldo Fernandes Silva	Brazil		14.88	
5	4	1472	Pierre Fairbank	France		14.96	
6	7	1501	Mickey Bushell	Great Britain		15.09	
7	1	2375	Brian Siemann	United States		15.23	
8	8	1786	Fahad Alganaidl	Saudi Arabia		15.35	
