= Indonesia at the 2008 Summer Paralympics =

- IPC code: INA
- NPC: National Paralympic Committee of Indonesia
- Website: www.npcindonesia.org (in Indonesian)

in Beijing
- Competitors: 3 in 3 sports
- Flag bearer: Billy Zeth Makal
- Medals: Gold 0 Silver 0 Bronze 0 Total 0

Summer Paralympics appearances (overview)
- 1976; 1980; 1984; 1988; 1992; 1996; 2000; 2004; 2008; 2012; 2016; 2020; 2024

Indonesia sent a delegation to compete at the 2008 Summer Paralympics in Beijing. The country sent three athletes to compete in three sports.

== Sports ==
=== Powerlifting ===
Athlete	Event	Result	Rank
Billy Zeth Makal	60kg	157.5	8

=== Swimming ===
Athlete	Class	Event	Heats		Final	
Athlete	Class	Event	Result	Rank	Result	Rank
Lamri	S9	100m backstroke	1:12.13	9	did not advance	

=== Wheelchair tennis ===
Athlete	Event	Round of 32	Round of 16	Quarterfinals	Semifinals	Finals
Athlete	Event	Opposition Result	Opposition Result	Opposition Result	Opposition Result	Opposition Result
Yanni Ida	Women's singles	Arnoult (USA); L 0-6, 0-6	did not advance			

== See also ==
- Indonesia at the Paralympics
- Indonesia at the 2008 Summer Olympics
