= Indonesia at the 2004 Summer Paralympics =

- IPC code: INA
- NPC: National Paralympic Committee of Indonesia
- Website: www.npcindonesia.org (in Indonesian)

in Athens
- Competitors: 3 in 2 sports
- Flag bearer: Steven Sualang
- Medals: Gold 0 Silver 0 Bronze 0 Total 0

Summer Paralympics appearances (overview)
- 1976; 1980; 1984; 1988; 1992; 1996; 2000; 2004; 2008; 2012; 2016; 2020; 2024

Indonesia competed at the 2004 Summer Paralympics in Athens, Greece. The team included 3 athletes, but won no medals.

== Sports ==
=== Swimming ===
Athlete	Class	Event	Heats		Final	
Athlete	Class	Event	Result	Rank	Result	Rank
Steven Sualang	S10	100m backstroke	DSQ		did not advance	

=== Wheelchair tennis ===
Athlete	Class	Event	Round of 64	Round of 32	Round of 16	Quarterfinals	Semifinals	Finals
Athlete	Class	Event	Opposition Result	Opposition Result	Opposition Result	Opposition Result	Opposition Result	Opposition Result
Yasin Onasie	Open	Men's singles	Kunieda (JPN); L 0-6, 0-6	did not advance				
Agus Sugiharto	Open	Men's singles	Shevchick (RUS); L 2-6, 1-6	did not advance				
Yasin Onasie; Agus Sugiharto	Open	Men's doubles	—	Olsson (SWE); Wikstrom (SWE); L 0-6, 0-6	did not advance			

== See also ==
- Indonesia at the Paralympics
- Indonesia at the 2004 Summer Olympics
