= Saudi Arabia at the 2024 Summer Paralympics =

2024 sporting event delegation in Paris

- Flag of Saudi Arabia
- IPC code: KSA
- NPC: Saudi Olympic & Paralympic Committee
- Website: olympic.sa

in Paris, France August 28, 2024 – September 8, 2024
- Competitors: 9 (7 men and 2 women) in 5 sports
- Flag bearers: Ghaliah Al-Anazi; Abdulrahman Al-Qurashi
- Medals Ranked 65th: Gold 1 Silver 0 Bronze 0 Total 1

Summer Paralympics appearances (overview)
- 1996; 2000; 2004; 2008; 2012; 2016; 2020; 2024

Saudi Arabia competed at the 2024 Summer Paralympics in Paris, France, from 28 August to 8 September 2024.

== Medalists ==
Medal	Name	Sport	Event	Date
Gold	Abdulrahman Al-Qurashi	Athletics	Men's 100 m T53	4 September

== Competitors ==
The following is the list of number of competitors in the Games, including game-eligible alternates in team sports.

Sport	Men	Women	Total
Athletics	4	1	5
Equestrian	1	0	1
Powerlifting	1	0	1
Table tennis	0	1	1
Taekwondo	1	0	1
Total	7	2	9

== Athletics ==
Key

- Note–Ranks given for track events are within the athlete's heat only
- Q = Qualified for the next round
- q = Qualified for the next round as a fastest loser or, in field events, by position without achieving the qualifying target
- DQ = Disqualified
- PR = Paralympic Record
- AR = Area (or continental) Record
- NR = National Record
- N/A = Round not applicable for the event
- Bye = Athlete not required to compete in round

Track & road events

Athlete	Event	Heat		Final	
Athlete	Event	Result	Rank	Result	Rank
Ali Al-Nakhli	Men's 100 m T37	11.60	3 Q	11.58	6
Ali Al-Nakhli	Men's 200 m T37	23.43	2 Q	23.44	7
Nour Al-Sana	Men's 100 m T44	—N/a		11.70	6
Abdulrahman Al-Qurashi	Men's 100 m T53	14.57	1 Q	14.48	1st place, gold medalist(s)
Abdulrahman Al-Qurashi	Men's 400 m T53	48.96	3 Q	49.38	5

Field events

Athlete	Event	Final	
Athlete	Event	Result	Rank
Hassan Dawshi	Men's long jump T20	7.31	4
Sarah Al-Jumaah	Women's shot put F34	6.72	8

== Equestrian ==
Athlete	Horse	Event	Score	Rank
Ahmed Al-Sharbatly	Godiva DII	Individual championship test grade V	65.308	16

== Powerlifting ==
Athlete	Event	Total lifted	Rank
Adnan Noorsaeed	Men's –49 kg	160	7

== Table tennis ==
Athlete	Event	Round of 16	Quarterfinals	Semifinals	Final / BM	
Athlete	Event	Opposition Result	Opposition Result	Opposition Result	Opposition Result	Rank
Ghaliah Al-Anazi	Women's individual C4	Shackleton (GBR); L 0–3	Did not advance			=9

== Taekwondo ==
Athlete	Event	Round of 16	Quarterfinals	Repechage	Semifinals	Final / BM	
Athlete	Event	Opposition Result	Opposition Result	Opposition Result	Opposition Result	Opposition Result	Rank
Eyad Abdullah Al-Turayk	Men's −63 kg	Castro (DOM); L 9–23	Did not advance				=9

== See also ==
- Saudi Arabia at the 2024 Summer Olympics
- Saudi Arabia at the Paralympics
