= Weightlifting at the 1980 Summer Paralympics – Men's -57 kg amputee =

Men's -57 kg amputee at the VI Paralympic Games
- Paralympic Weightlifting
- Competitors: 1 from 1 nation

Medalists
1st place, gold medalist(s)		R. S. Arlen	Indonesia

The Men's featherweight -57 kg amputee was an event in weightlifting at the 1980 Summer Paralympics, for amputee athletes. Indonesia's R. S. Arlen was the only competitor in the event and only needed to record a valid lift to win the gold. And thus he did, recording a lift of 65 kg to win gold.

== Results ==
Place	Name	Result (kg)
1	R. S. Arlen (INA)	65

== See also ==
- Weightlifting at the 1980 Summer Paralympics
