= Indonesia at the 1988 Summer Paralympics =

- IPC code: INA
- NPC: National Paralympic Committee of Indonesia
- Website: www.npcindonesia.org (in Indonesian)

in Seoul
- Competitors: 22
- Medals Ranked 43rd: Gold 0 Silver 2 Bronze 0 Total 2

Summer Paralympics appearances (overview)
- 1976; 1980; 1984; 1988; 1992; 1996; 2000; 2004; 2008; 2012; 2016; 2020; 2024

Indonesia competed at the 1988 Summer Paralympics in Seoul, South Korea. Indonesia won 2 medals, both silver, finishing 43rd in the medal table.

== Medalists ==
Medal	Name	Sport	Event
Silver	Hadi Abdulaziz	Athletics	Men's high jump B1
Silver	Soeparni	Athletics	Men's shot put A4/A9

== See also ==
- 1988 Paralympic Games
- 1988 Olympic Games
- Indonesia at the Paralympics
- Indonesia at the Olympics
- Indonesia at the 1988 Summer Olympics
