= Indonesia at the 1976 Summer Paralympics =

- IPC code: INA
- NPC: National Paralympic Committee of Indonesia
- Website: www.npcindonesia.org (in Indonesian)

in Toronto
- Competitors: 18
- Medals Ranked 26th: Gold 2 Silver 1 Bronze 3 Total 6

Summer Paralympics appearances (overview)
- 1976; 1980; 1984; 1988; 1992; 1996; 2000; 2004; 2008; 2012; 2016; 2020; 2024

Indonesia sent a delegation to compete at the 1976 Summer Paralympics in Toronto, Ontario, Canada. Its athletes finished twenty sixth in the overall medal count.

== Medalists ==
Medal	Name	Sport	Event
Gold	Itria Dini	Athletics	Men's precision javelin throw F
Gold	Syarifuddin	Lawn bowls	Men's singles E
Silver	Ashari	Athletics	Men's 100 meters E
Bronze	Itria Dini	Athletics	Men's shot put F
Bronze	Saneng Hanafi	Athletics	Men's discus throw F
Bronze	Saneng Hanafi	Athletics	Men's javelin throw F

== See also ==
- 1976 Paralympic Games
- 1976 Olympic Games
- Indonesia at the Paralympics
- Indonesia at the Olympics
- Indonesia at the 1976 Summer Olympics
