= Powerlifting at the 2012 Summer Paralympics – Women's 40 kg =

Powerlifting – Women's 40 kg at the XIV Paralympic Games
- Venue: ExCeL London
- Date: 30 August 2012
- Competitors: 8 from 8 nations
- Winning lift: 106.0 kg

Medalists
1st place, gold medalist(s)		Nazmiye Muslu	Turkey
2nd place, silver medalist(s)		Zhe Cui	China
3rd place, bronze medalist(s)		Zoe Newson	Great Britain

The women's 40 kg powerlifting event at the 2012 Summer Paralympics was contested on 30 August at ExCeL London.

== Records ==
Prior to the competition, the existing world and Paralympic records were as follows.

World record	106.5 kg	Nazmiye Muslu (TUR)	Dubai, United Arab Emirates	22 February 2012
Paralympic record	105.5 kg	Lidiia Soloviova (UKR)	Beijing, China	9 September 2008

The world record holder, Nazmiye Muslu of Turkey, broke both of these records during the competition.

== Results ==
Rank	Name	Body weight (kg)	Attempts (kg)				Result (kg)
Rank	Name	Body weight (kg)	1	2	3	4	Result (kg)
1st place, gold medalist(s)	Nazmiye Muslu (TUR)	39.36	100.0	104.0	106.0	109.0 WR	106.0 PR
2nd place, silver medalist(s)	Zhe Cui (CHN)	39.18	97.0	~~103.0~~	~~104.0~~	–	97.0
3rd place, bronze medalist(s)	Zoe Newson (GBR)	39.40	84.0	~~88.0~~	88.0	–	88.0
4	Thi Hong Nguyen (VIE)	39.69	~~88.0~~	88.0	~~90.0~~	–	88.0
5	Ni Nengah Widiasih (INA)	38.98	~~78.0~~	78.0	~~88.0~~	–	78.0
6	Malika Matar (MAR)	38.02	73.0	~~76.0~~	76.0	–	76.0
7	Maryna Kopiika (UKR)	38.90	70.0	73.0	~~74.0~~	–	73.0
–	Noura Baddour (SYR)	37.24	~~88.0~~	~~88.0~~	~~88.0~~	–	NMR
