= Saudi Arabia at the 2012 Summer Paralympics =

- IPC code: KSA
- NPC: Paralympic Committee of Saudi Arabia

in London
- Competitors: 4 in 2 sports
- Medals Ranked 67th: Gold 0 Silver 1 Bronze 0 Total 1

Summer Paralympics appearances (overview)
- 1996; 2000; 2004; 2008; 2012; 2016; 2020; 2024

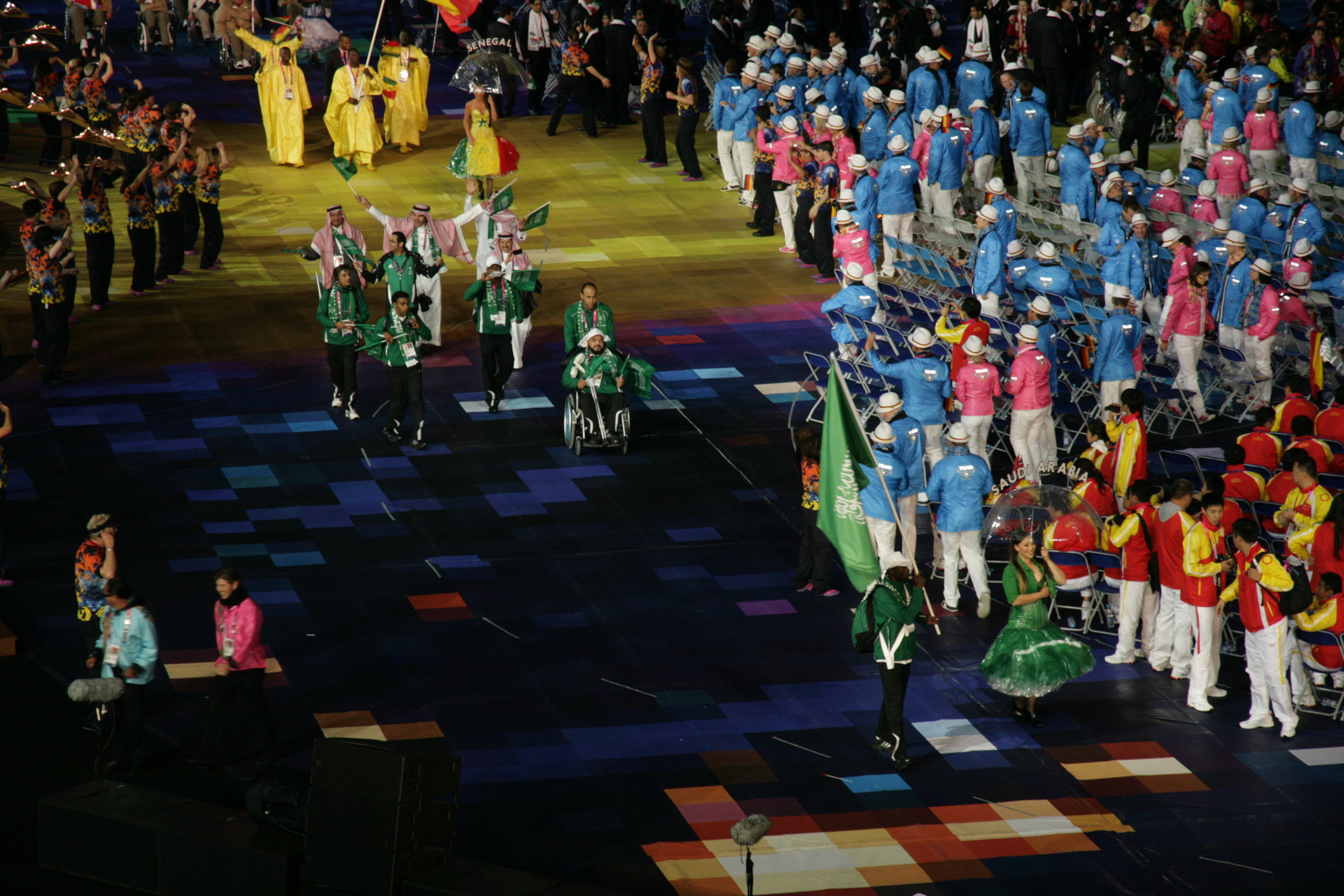
Saudi Arabia Paralympic team at the London 2012 Opening Ceremony

Saudi Arabia participated in the 2012 Summer Paralympics in London, United Kingdom, from August 29 to September 9.

Although the country sent female athletes for the first time to the London Olympics, under pressure from the International Olympic Committee, its Paralympic delegation to the London Games remained, as previously, exclusively male. The Kingdom was represented by three athletes in track and field, and one in powerlifting.

== Medallists ==
Medal	Name	Sport	Event	Date
Silver	Hani Alnakhli	Athletics	Men's Discus Throw F32-34	7 September

== Athletics ==
Osamah Al-Shanqiti, who won the country's first ever Olympic or Paralympic gold medal at the Beijing Paralympics, in the triple jump, attempted to defend his title in the men's triple jump F12 (a category for athletes with severe visual impairment). He also competed in the shot put (F11-12).

Saeed Alkhaldi competed in the men's 100m T46 (for athletes with disabilities to the upper limbs or torso).

Hani Alnakhli competed in the men's shot put F32-33 (tetraplegia) and in the men's discus throw F32-34.

Men's Track and Road Events

Athlete	Event	Heat		Final	
Athlete	Event	Result	Rank	Result	Rank
Saeed Alkhaldi	100m T46	11.41	4	did not advance	

Men's Field Events

Athlete	Event	Distance	Points	Rank
Osamah Al-Shanqiti	Triple Jump F12	14.10	—	5
Osamah Al-Shanqiti	Shot Put F11-12	NM		
Hani Alnakhli	Shot Put F32-33	8.16	724	9
Hani Alnakhli	Discus Throw F32-34	34.65	1113	2nd place, silver medalist(s)

== Powerlifting ==
Bassam Al-Hawal competed in the men's under 100kg event.

Men

Athlete	Event	Result	Rank
Bassam Al-Hawal	-100kg	195	8

== See also ==
- Summer Paralympic disability classification
- Saudi Arabia at the Paralympics
- Saudi Arabia at the 2012 Summer Olympics
