= Indonesia at the 1984 Summer Paralympics =

- IPC code: INA
- NPC: National Paralympic Committee of Indonesia
- Website: www.npcindonesia.org (in Indonesian)

in Stoke Mandeville/New York
- Competitors: 12
- Medals Ranked 41st: Gold 0 Silver 1 Bronze 1 Total 2

Summer Paralympics appearances (overview)
- 1976; 1980; 1984; 1988; 1992; 1996; 2000; 2004; 2008; 2012; 2016; 2020; 2024

Indonesia competed at the 1984 Summer Paralympics in Stoke Mandeville, Great Britain and New York City, United States. Indonesia won 2 medals, 1 silver and 1 bronze and finished joint 41st in the medal table with The Bahamas.

== Medalists ==
| Medal | Name | Sport | Event |
|---|---|---|---|
| Silver | Ninik Umardiyani | Lawn bowls | Women's singles A2/4 |
| Bronze | Kurnianto; Memed Lesmana | Lawn bowls | Men's pairs A6/8 |

== See also ==
- 1984 Paralympic Games
- 1984 Olympic Games
- Indonesia at the Paralympics
- Indonesia at the Olympics
- Indonesia at the 1984 Summer Olympics
