= Swimming at the 2012 Summer Paralympics – Men's 100 metre backstroke S6 =

Event at the 2012 Summer Paralympics

Men's 100 metre backstroke S6 at the XIV Paralympic Games
- Venue: London Aquatics Centre
- Dates: 30 August 2012
- Competitors: 13 from 9 nations

Medalists
1st place, gold medalist(s)		Tao Zheng	China
2nd place, silver medalist(s)		Jia Hongguang	China
3rd place, bronze medalist(s)		Sebastian Iwanow	Germany

The men's 100 metre backstroke S6 event at the 2012 Paralympic Games took place on 30 August, at the London Aquatics Centre.

Two heats were held, one with six swimmers and one with seven swimmers. The swimmers with the eight fastest times advanced to the final.

== Heats ==
=== Heat 1 ===
Rank	Lane	Name	Nationality	Time	Notes
1	4	Iaroslav Semenenko	Ukraine	1:18.24	Q
2	5	Sebastian Iwanow	Germany	1:20.39	Q
3	3	Matthew Haanappel	Australia	1:24.02 OC	Q
4	2	Aaron Rhind	Australia	1:25.36	Q
5	6	Sit Aung Naing	Myanmar	1:27.00	
6	7	Ivanildo Vasconcelos	Brazil	1:37.68	

=== Heat 2 ===
Rank	Lane	Name	Nationality	Time	Notes
1	5	Jia Hongguang	China	1:14.98 AS	Q
2	4	Tao Zheng	China	1:16.37	Q
3	3	Swen Michaelis	Germany	1:23.49	Q
4	2	Jawad Kadhim Joudah Joudah	Iraq	1:24.59	Q
5	7	Reagan Wickens	Australia	1:32.94	
6	1	Yoav Valinsky	Israel	1:34.12	
	6	Agus Ngaimin	Indonesia	Did not start	

== Final ==
Rank	Lane	Name	Nationality	Time	Notes
1st place, gold medalist(s)	5	Tao Zheng	China	1:13.56	WR
2nd place, silver medalist(s)	4	Jia Hongguang	China	1:14.64	
3rd place, bronze medalist(s)	6	Sebastian Iwanow	Germany	1:15.95	
4	3	Iaroslav Semenenko	Ukraine	1:15.98	
5	7	Matthew Haanappel	Australia	1:21.25	OC
6	2	Swen Michaelis	Germany	1:23.54	
7	1	Jawad Kadhim Joudah Joudah	Iraq	1:25.31	
8	8	Aaron Rhind	Australia	1:29.28	
