= Athletics at the 2016 Summer Paralympics – Men's 400 metres T53 =

Men's 400 metres T53 at the XV Paralympic Games
- Venue: Rio Olympic Stadium
- Dates: 10–11 September
- Competitors: 19

Medalists
1st place, gold medalist(s)		Pongsakorn Paeyo	Thailand
2nd place, silver medalist(s)		Brent Lakatos	Canada
3rd place, bronze medalist(s)		Pierre Fairbank	France

The Men's 400 metres T53 event at the 2016 Summer Paralympics took place at the Estádio Olímpico João Havelange on 10 and 11 September. It featured 19 athletes.

The T53 category is for wheelchair athletes with normal use of arms and hands, no or limited trunk function, and no leg function.

== Records ==
Prior to the competition, the existing World and Paralympic records were as follows:

Worldrecord	Hong Sukman (KOR)	47.36	26 June 2010	Arbon, Switzerland
Paralympic record	Hong Sukman (KOR)	47.67	11 September 2008	Beijing, China

== Results ==
=== Heats ===
Qualification rule: The first two finishers in each heat (Q) and the next two fastest (q) qualify for the final.

==== Heat 1 ====
Rank	Lane	Athlete	Nationality	Time	Notes
1		Brent Lakatos	Canada	50.47	Q, PB
2		Brian Siemann	Netherlands	51.30	Q
3		Yu Shiran	China	51.51	SB
4		Jung Dong Ho	South Korea	52.30	
5		Richard Colman	Australia	52.59	
6		Hamad Aladwani	Kuwait	52.97	
-		Pichet Krungget	Thailand	DNS	

==== Heat 2 ====
Rank	Lane	Athlete	Nationality	Time	Notes
1		Pongsakorn Paeyo	Thailand	48.38	Q PB
2		Li Huzhao	China	49.48	Q
3		Joshua George	United States	50.11	q
4		Jean-Philippe Maranda	Canada	52.24	
5		Nicolas Brignone	France	53.01	
6		Mickey Bushell	Great Britain	54.02	

==== Heat 3 ====
Rank	Lane	Athlete	Nationality	Time	Notes
1		Pierre Fairbank	France	49.06	Q, SB
2		Zhao Yufei	China	49.99	Q, PB
3		Moatez Jomni	Great Britain	51.14	q
4		Hitoshi Matsunaga	Japan	52.71	
5		Ariosvaldo Fernandes Silva	Brazil	DSQ	
6		Yoo Byung Hoon	South Korea	DSQ	

=== Final ===
Rank	Lane	Athlete	Nationality	Time	Notes
1st place, gold medalist(s)		Pongsakorn Paeyo	Thailand	47.91	
2nd place, silver medalist(s)		Brent Lakatos	Canada	48.53	
3rd place, bronze medalist(s)		Pierre Fairbank	France	49.00	
4		Li Huzhao	China	50.11	
5		Brian Siemann	Netherlands	50.20	
6		Zhao Yufei	China	50.42	
7		Joshua George	United States	50.80	
8		Moatez Jomni	Great Britain	51.53	
