= Athletics at the 2008 Summer Paralympics – Men's long jump F12 =

The Men's Long Jump F12 had its Final held on September 13 at 9:05.

== Medalists ==
Gold	Hilton Langenhoven; South Africa
Silver	Osamah Alshanqiti; Saudi Arabia
Bronze	Oleg Panyutin; Azerbaijan

== Results ==
Place	Athlete	1	2	3	4	5	6	Best
1	Hilton Langenhoven (RSA)	6.91	7.00	7.10	7.31	7.10	x	7.31 PR
2	Osamah Alshanqiti (KSA)	6.94	x	6.77	6.98	7.05	7.06	7.06
3	Oleg Panyutin (AZE)	7.03	5.9	7.06	7.04	6.96	6.79	7.06
4	Vladimir Zayets (AZE)	6.34	6.25	6.68	6.65	6.81	6.77	6.81
5	Siarhei Burdukou (BLR)	6.61	6.66	6.63	6.75	6.72	6.19	6.75
6	Ronan Pallier (FRA)	6.33	6.35	6.66	x	x	x	6.66
7	Stephane Bozzolo (FRA)	6.53	6.51	6.38	6.29	6.33	6.11	6.53
8	Ruslan Katyshev (UKR)	x	6.38	5.90	-	-	-	6.38
9	Antoine Perel (FRA)	6.37	6.15	6.22				6.37
10	Thomas Ulbricht (GER)	6.33	x	6.07				6.33
11	Evgeny Kegelev (RUS)	6.02	5.74	5.94				6.02
12	Oduver Daza (VEN)	5.98	5.90	5.72				5.98
13	Jorg Trippen-Hilgers (GER)	5.88	5.78	x				5.88
