= Indonesia at the 1980 Summer Paralympics =

- IPC code: INA
- NPC: National Paralympic Committee of Indonesia
- Website: www.npcindonesia.org (in Indonesian)

in Arnhem
- Competitors: 29
- Medals Ranked 28th: Gold 2 Silver 0 Bronze 4 Total 6

Summer Paralympics appearances (overview)
- 1976; 1980; 1984; 1988; 1992; 1996; 2000; 2004; 2008; 2012; 2016; 2020; 2024

Indonesia sent a delegation to compete at the 1980 Summer Paralympics in Arnhem, Netherlands. Its athletes finished twenty eighth in the overall medal count.

== Medalists ==
Medal	Name	Sport	Event
Gold	Yan Soebiyanto	Lawn bowls	Men's singles E
Gold	R.S. Arlen	Weightlifting	Men's featherweight -57 kg amputee
Bronze	Sigit Soepadi	Lawn bowls	Men's singles E
Bronze	Soekarsan	Lawn bowls	Men's singles F
Bronze	Moenali; Yamin Ismail	Lawn bowls	Men's pairs C
Bronze	R.S. Arlen; Safri Tanjung	Lawn bowls	Men's pairs D

== See also ==
- 1980 Paralympic Games
- 1980 Olympic Games
- Indonesia at the Paralympics
- Indonesia at the Olympics
