= Powerlifting at the 2020 Summer Paralympics – Women's 41 kg =

Powerlifting – Women's 41 kg at the XVI Paralympic Games
- Venue: Tokyo International Forum
- Date: 26 August 2021
- Competitors: 10 from 10 nations
- Winning lift: 108.0 kg

Medalists
1st place, gold medalist(s)		Guo Lingling	China
2nd place, silver medalist(s)		Ni Nengah Widiasih	Indonesia
3rd place, bronze medalist(s)		Clara Fuentes Monasterio	Venezuela

The women's 41 kg powerlifting event at the 2020 Summer Paralympics was contested on 26 August at Tokyo International Forum.

== Records ==
There are twenty powerlifting events, corresponding to ten weight classes each for men and women. Prior to this competition, the existing world and Paralympic records were as follows.

World Record	Guo Lingling (CHN)	107.0 kg	Dubai, United Arab Emirates	19 June 2021
Paralympic Record	Nazmiye Muslu Muratlı (TUR)	104.0 kg	Rio de Janeiro, Brazil	8 September 2016

== Results ==
Rank	Name	Body weight (kg)	Attempts (kg)				Result (kg)
Rank	Name	Body weight (kg)	1	2	3	4	Result (kg)
1st place, gold medalist(s)	Guo Lingling (CHN)	40.13	105	~~108~~	108	109 WR PR	108
2nd place, silver medalist(s)	Ni Nengah Widiasih (INA)	39.53	96	~~98~~	98	–	98
3rd place, bronze medalist(s)	Clara Fuentes Monasterio (VEN)	40.37	~~97~~	97	~~99~~	–	97
4	Zoe Newson (GBR)	40.70	94	~~97~~	~~97~~	–	94
5	Hellen Wawira Kariuki (KEN)	40.37	90	93	~~95~~	–	93
6	Cristina Poblador (COL)	39.31	~~92~~	92	~~96~~	–	92
7	Lara Aparecida de Lima (BRA)	39.11	88	~~92~~	~~96~~	–	88
8	Noura Baddour (SYR)	39.65	82	~~86~~	~~86~~	–	82
–	Maryna Kopiika (UKR)	40.17	~~88~~	~~90~~	~~90~~	–	NMR
–	Leidy Rodríguez (CUB)	40.76	~~92~~	~~92~~	~~93~~	–	NMR
