= Pongsakorn Paeyo =

Thai wheelchair racer

Personal information
- Native name: พงศกร แปยอ
- Nickname: Korn
- Born: 1 December 1996 (age 29) Khon Kaen, Thailand

Sport
- Disability: Polio from birth
- Disability class: T53
- Coached by: Suphot Phengphum

Achievements and titles
- Paralympic finals: 2016; 2020; 2024
Medal record
Event	1st	2nd	3rd
Paralympic Games	6	4	0
World Championships	6	6	4
Asian Para Games	6	1	0
ASEAN Para Games	6	0	0
Men's paralympic athletics
Representing Thailand
Paralympic Games
Gold medal – first place	2016 Rio de Janeiro	400 m T53
Gold medal – first place	2016 Rio de Janeiro	800 m T53
Gold medal – first place	2020 Tokyo	100 m T53
Gold medal – first place	2020 Tokyo	400 m T53
Gold medal – first place	2020 Tokyo	800 m T53
Gold medal – first place	2024 Paris	400 m T53
Silver medal – second place	2016 Rio de Janeiro	100 m T53
Silver medal – second place	2016 Rio de Janeiro	4 x 400 m T53-54
Silver medal – second place	2024 Paris	100 m T53
Silver medal – second place	2024 Paris	800 m T53
World Championships
Gold medal – first place	2019 Dubai	400 m T53
Gold medal – first place	2023 Paris	100 m T53
Gold medal – first place	2023 Paris	400 m T53
Gold medal – first place	2025 New Delhi	100 m T53
Gold medal – first place	2025 New Delhi	400 m T53
Gold medal – first place	2025 New Delhi	800 m T53
Silver medal – second place	2015 Doha	200 m T53
Silver medal – second place	2015 Doha	4 x 400 m T53-54
Silver medal – second place	2017 London	200 m T53
Silver medal – second place	2017 London	400 m T53
Silver medal – second place	2019 Dubai	800 m T53
Silver medal – second place	2023 Paris	800 m T53
Bronze medal – third place	2015 Doha	400 m T53
Bronze medal – third place	2017 London	100 m T53
Bronze medal – third place	2017 London	800 m T53
Bronze medal – third place	2019 Dubai	100 m T53
Asian Para Games
Gold medal – first place	2018 Jakarta	100 m T53
Gold medal – first place	2018 Jakarta	200 m T53
Gold medal – first place	2018 Jakarta	400 m T53
Gold medal – first place	2018 Jakarta	800 m T53
Gold medal – first place	2022 Hangzhou	400 m T53
Gold medal – first place	2022 Hangzhou	800 m T53
Silver medal – second place	2022 Hangzhou	100 m T53
ASEAN Para Games
Gold medal – first place	2015 Singapore	100 m T53
Gold medal – first place	2015 Singapore	400 m T53
Gold medal – first place	2015 Singapore	800 m T53
Gold medal – first place	2017 Kuala Lumpur	100 m T52/53
Gold medal – first place	2017 Kuala Lumpur	400 m T52/53
Gold medal – first place	2017 Kuala Lumpur	800 m T53

Pongsakorn Paeyo (Thai: พงศกร แปยอ, RTGS: Phongsakon Paeyo, pronounced [pʰōŋ.sā.kɔ̄ːn pɛ̄ː.jɔ̄ː]; born 1 December 1996) is a Thai wheelchair racer in the T53 classification. Paeyo represented Thailand at the 2016, 2020 and 2024 Summer Paralympics.

== Career ==
At the 2016 Paralympic games in Rio, he won two gold medals in the 400 metres and 800 metres event and two silver medals in the 100 metres and 4×400 relay event. In August 2021, Paeyo set the new world record at the 2020 Tokyo Paralympics in the 400 metres event and claimed his third Paralympic gold medal.

== Major results ==
Year	Venue	Events	Heat		Final		Rank
Year	Venue	Events	Time	Rank	Time	Rank	Rank
Paralympic Games
2020	Tokyo, Japan	100 m T53	14.30 PR	1 Q	14.20 PR	1	1st place, gold medalist(s)
2020	Tokyo, Japan	400 m T53	47.31 PR	1 Q	46.61 WR	1	1st place, gold medalist(s)
2020	Tokyo, Japan	800 m T53	1:40.28	1 Q	1:36.07 PR	1	1st place, gold medalist(s)
2016	Rio de Janeiro, Brazil	100 m T53	14.56 PR	1 Q	14.80	2	2nd place, silver medalist(s)
2016	Rio de Janeiro, Brazil	400 m T53	48.38	1 Q	47.91	1	1st place, gold medalist(s)
2016	Rio de Janeiro, Brazil	800 m T53	1:37.45	1 Q	1:40.78	1	1st place, gold medalist(s)
2016	Rio de Janeiro, Brazil	4 × 400 m T53-54	3:08.37	1 Q	3:07.73	2	2nd place, silver medalist(s)
World Championships
2023	Paris, France	100 m T53	14.84	2 Q	14.51	1	1st place, gold medalist(s)
2023	Paris, France	400 m T53	47.51 CR	1 Q	46.11 WR	1	1st place, gold medalist(s)
2023	Paris, France	800 m T53	—N/a		1:34.39	2	2nd place, silver medalist(s)
2019	Dubai, United Arab Emirates	100 m T53	14.52	1 Q	14.97	3	3rd place, bronze medalist(s)
2019	Dubai, United Arab Emirates	400 m T53	48.24	1 Q	48.08	1	1st place, gold medalist(s)
2019	Dubai, United Arab Emirates	800 m T53	1:39.75	1 Q	1:40.72	2	2nd place, silver medalist(s)
2017	London, United Kingdom	100 m T53	14.99	1 Q	14.88	3	3rd place, bronze medalist(s)
2017	London, United Kingdom	200 m T53	25.88	1 Q	25.29 =CR	2	2nd place, silver medalist(s)
2017	London, United Kingdom	400 m T53	49.18	1 Q	47.97	2	2nd place, silver medalist(s)
2017	London, United Kingdom	800 m T53	1:46.54	3 Q	1:42.07	3	3rd place, bronze medalist(s)
2015	Doha, Qatar	100 m T53	15.71	3 Q	16.22	7	7
2015	Doha, Qatar	200 m T53	26.96	2 Q	26.97	2	2nd place, silver medalist(s)
2015	Doha, Qatar	400 m T53	51.51	2 Q	50.42	3	3rd place, bronze medalist(s)
2015	Doha, Qatar	800 m T53	1:47.90	2 Q	1:44.35	4	6
2015	Doha, Qatar	4 × 400 m T53-54	—N/a		3.12.22 NR	2	2nd place, silver medalist(s)
