= Athletics at the 2016 Summer Paralympics – Men's 800 metres T53 =

Men's 800 metres T53 at the XV Paralympic Games
- Venue: Estádio Olímpico João Havelange
- Dates: 14–15 September 2016
- Competitors: 16 from 11 nations

Medalists
1st place, gold medalist(s)		Pongsakorn Paeyo	Thailand
2nd place, silver medalist(s)		Pierre Fairbank	France
3rd place, bronze medalist(s)		Brent Lakatos	Canada

The T53 category is for wheelchair athletes with normal use of arms and hands, no or limited trunk function, and no leg function.

The Athletics at the 2016 Summer Paralympics – Men's 800 metres T53 event at the 2016 Paralympic Games took place on 14–15 September 2016, at the Estádio Olímpico João Havelange.

== Heats ==
=== Heat 1 ===
11:26 14 September 2016:

Rank	Lane	Bib	Name	Nationality	Reaction	Time	Notes
1	1	2232	Pongsakorn Paeyo	Thailand		1:37.45	Q
2	2	1249	Huzhao Li	China		1:37.77	Q
3	8	2352	Joshua George	United States		1:37.87	Q
4	5	1778	Dong-ho Jung	South Korea		1:38.77	q
5	7	1794	Hamad Aladwani	Kuwait		1:43.69	q
6	4	1049	Richard Colman	Australia		1:43.79	
7	6	1735	Hitoshi Matsunaga	Japan		1:44.67	
8	3	1209	Jean-Philippe Maranda	Canada		1:44.98	

=== Heat 2 ===
11:34 14 September 2016:

Rank	Lane	Bib	Name	Nationality	Reaction	Time	Notes
1	4	1208	Brent Lakatos	Canada		1:43.37	Q
2	5	1472	Pierre Fairbank	France		1:43.54	Q
3	3	2375	Brian Siemann	United States		1:43.79	Q
4	7	1780	Byung Hoon Yoo	South Korea		1:44.14	
5	2	1271	Yufei Zhao	China		1:44.46	
6	8	1509	Moatez Jomni	Great Britain		1:46.23	
	1	2230	Pichet Krungget	Thailand			DSQ
	6	1671	Patrick Monahan	Ireland			DSQ

== Final ==
19:01 15 September 2016:

Rank	Lane	Bib	Name	Nationality	Reaction	Time	Notes
1st place, gold medalist(s)	4	2232	Pongsakorn Paeyo	Thailand		1:40.78	
2nd place, silver medalist(s)	5	1472	Pierre Fairbank	France		1:40.97	
3rd place, bronze medalist(s)	8	1208	Brent Lakatos	Canada		1:41.09	
4	1	2375	Brian Siemann	United States		1:41.11	
5	3	2352	Joshua George	United States		1:41.23	
6	6	1249	Huzhao Li	China		1:41.91	
7	7	1778	Dong-ho Jung	South Korea		1:42.89	
8	2	1794	Hamad Aladwani	Kuwait		1:50.62	
