= Lawn bowls at the 1980 Summer Paralympics =

Lawn bowls at the VI Paralympic Games
- Paralympic Lawn bowls

Lawn bowls at the 1980 Summer Paralympics consisted of nineteen events, thirteen for men and six for women.

== Medal summary ==
=== Men's events ===
Event	Gold	Silver	Bronze
Singles 1A-1B	David Cale; Great Britain	Rod Vleiger; United States	Tommy Taylor; Great Britain
Singles 2-5	Ken Bridgeman; Great Britain	Engelbert Rangger; Austria	Paul Silva; Great Britain
Singles A	William McLeod; Great Britain	None	None
Singles B	J. Hughes; Great Britain	None	None
Singles C	Paul Smyth; Ireland	R. Miller; Great Britain	Neil Shaw; Great Britain
Singles D	R. Newton; Great Britain	J. Gladman; Great Britain	Bill Ensor; Ireland
Singles D1	C. Brinkmann; United States	Salem Mohamed El Zeini; Egypt	None
Singles E	Yan Soebiyanto; Indonesia	Toshiichi Hatsumi; Japan	Sigit Soepadi; Indonesia
Singles F	Seiji Ishii; Japan	Michael Byrne; Great Britain	Soekarsan; Indonesia
Pairs 1A-1B	Great Britain (GBR); David Cale; Tommy Taylor	Ireland (IRL); W. Donnell; P. McGoole	United States (USA); J. Lewellyn; Rod Vleiger
Pairs 2-5	Great Britain (GBR); Ken Bridgeman; Brian Faulkner	Austria (AUT); Engelbert Rangger; B. Seidl	Great Britain (GBR); John Gronow; Paul Silva
Pairs C	Ireland (IRL); Bill Ensor; Paul Smyth	Great Britain (GBR); R. Miller; Neil Shaw	Indonesia (INA); Moenali; Ismail Yamin
Pairs D	Great Britain (GBR); J. Gladman; R. Newton	Japan (JPN); Sato; Yoshiaki Takada	Indonesia (INA); R. S. Arlen; Safri Tanjung

=== Women's events ===
Event	Gold	Silver	Bronze
Singles 1A-1B	Maggie McLellan; Great Britain	Jane Blackburn; Great Britain	Eileen Robertson; Zimbabwe
Singles 2-5	C. Swanepoel; West Germany	Yvonne Hawtin; Great Britain	R. Thompson; Great Britain
Singles A	K. Bonnet; Great Britain	None	None
Singles B	Gloria Pascoe; Australia	None	None
Pairs 1A-1B	Great Britain (GBR); Jane Blackburn; Maggie McLellan	Zimbabwe (ZIM); Sandra James; Eileen Robertson	None
Pairs 2-5	Great Britain (GBR); Margaret Maughan; R. Thompson	Great Britain (GBR); Yvonne Hawtin; G. Matthews	Malta (MLT); C. Camilleri; L. Sammut
