= William McLeod (Paralympian) =

William McLeod MBE
Personal information
- Full name: William Borrie McLeod
- Nationality: British
- Born: Scotland

Sport
- Country: Great Britain
- Sport: Athletics; Lawn bowls
- Event(s): Long jump Pentathlon sprint Lawn bowls

Achievements and titles
- Paralympic finals: 1976; 1980; 1984
Medal record
Representing Great Britain
Paralympic Games
Men's athletics
Gold medal – first place	1980 New York	60m - A
Lawn bowls
Gold medal – first place	1980 New York	Men's singles A
Silver medal – second place	1976 Toronto	Men's singles A

William McLeod MBE is a Paralympian track and field athlete and lawn bowls player from Scotland competing mainly in category A events. In 1976 he competed as a lawn bowls player at the Summer Paralympics, winning a silver medal in the Men's singles. Four years later, at the 1980 Summer Paralympics in New York, he took gold in the Lawn Bowls Men's singles and the 60m sprint.

He was appointed a Member of the Order of the British Empire (MBE) in the 1985 Birthday Honours for services to sport for the disabled.
