= Athletics at the 2020 Summer Paralympics – Men's 100 metres T37 =

Men's 100 metres T37 at the XVI Paralympic Games
- Venue: Tokyo National Stadium
- Dates: 27 August 2021 (final)
- Competitors: 12 from 9 nations
- Winning time: 10.95

Medalists
1st place, gold medalist(s)		Nick Mayhugh	United States
2nd place, silver medalist(s)		Andrey Vdovin	RPC
3rd place, bronze medalist(s)		Saptoyoga Purnomo	Indonesia

Men's 100 metres
T11 · T12 · T13 · T33 · T34 · T35 · T36 · T37 · T38 · T47 · T51 · T52 · T53 · T54 · T63 · T64

The men's 100 metres T37 event at the 2020 Summer Paralympics in Tokyo, took place on 27 August 2021.

The T37 category is for ambulant athletes with cerebral palsy. These athletes have movement and coordination problems on one half of their body. They have good ability in their dominant side of their body (ie hemiplegia).

== Records ==
Prior to the competition, the existing records were as follows:

World record	Nick Mayhugh (USA)	11.21	Minneapolis, United States	18 June 2021
Paralympic record	Charl du Toit (RSA)	11.42	Rio de Janeiro, Brazil	10 September 2016

Area	Time	Athlete	Nation
Africa	11.42 PR	Charl du Toit	South Africa
America	11.21 WR	Nick Mayhugh	United States
Asia	11.46	Saptoyoga Purnomo	Indonesia
Europe	11.44	Andrey Vdovin	Russia
Oceania	12.22	Matthew Slade	New Zealand

== Results ==
=== Heats ===
Heat 1 took place on 27 August 2021, at 11:56:

Rank	Lane	Name	Nationality	Time	Notes
1	6	Saptoyoga Purnomo	Indonesia	11.33	Q, PR
2	7	Andrey Vdovin	RPC	11.34	Q, AR
3	5	Christian Da Costa	Brazil	11.51	Q
4	3	Vladyslav Zahrebelnyi	Ukraine	11.77	SB
5	4	Mateus Evangelista	Brazil	11.79	
6	8	Brian Lionel Impellizzeri	Argentina	12.56	SB

Heat 2 took place on 27 August 2021, at 12:03:

Rank	Lane	Name	Nationality	Time	Notes
1	6	Nick Mayhugh	United States	10.97	Q, WR
2	7	Chermen Kobesov	RPC	11.32	Q, AR
3	4	Ricardo Gomes de Mendonça	Brazil	11.45	Q, PB
4	3	Ali Alnakhli	Saudi Arabia	11.57	q, PB
5	5	Charl du Toit	South Africa	11.58	q
6	8	David Pleitez	El Salvador	12.72	SB

=== Final ===
The final took place on 27 August 2021, at 19:25:

Rank	Lane	Name	Nationality	Time	Notes
1st place, gold medalist(s)	6	Nick Mayhugh	United States	10.95	WR
2nd place, silver medalist(s)	5	Andrey Vdovin	RPC	11.18	AR
3rd place, bronze medalist(s)	7	Saptoyoga Purnomo	Indonesia	11.31	AR
4	4	Chermen Kobesov	RPC	11.32	=SB
5	9	Ricardo Gomes de Mendonça	Brazil	11.52	
6	3	Ali Alnakhli	Saudi Arabia	11.53	PB
7	8	Christian Da Costa	Brazil	11.55	
8	2	Charl du Toit	South Africa	11.63	
