= Badminton at the 2020 Summer Paralympics – Men's singles SU5 =

Men's singles SU5 at the XVI Paralympic Games
- Venue: Yoyogi National Gymnasium
- Dates: 1–4 September 2021
- Competitors: 8 from 7 nations

Medalists
1st place, gold medalist(s)		Cheah Liek Hou	Malaysia
2nd place, silver medalist(s)		Dheva Anrimusthi	Indonesia
3rd place, bronze medalist(s)		Suryo Nugroho	Indonesia

The men's singles SU5 tournament at the 2020 Summer Paralympics in Tokyo took place between 1 and 4 September 2021 at Yoyogi National Gymnasium.

== Seeds ==
These were the seeds for this event:

1. Dheva Anrimusthi (INA) (silver medalist)
2. Cheah Liek Hou (MAS) (gold medalist)

== Group stage ==
The draw of the group stage revealed on 26 August 2021. The group stage was played from 1 to 3 September. The top two winners of each group advanced to the knockout rounds.

=== Group A ===
Pos	Team	Pld	W	L	GF	GA	GD	PF	PA	PD	Pts	Qualification
1	Dheva Anrimusthi (INA)	3	3	0	6	0	+6	126	58	+68	3	Advance to semi-finals
2	Suryo Nugroho (INA)	3	2	1	4	2	+2	98	87	+11	2	Advance to semi-finals
3	Méril Loquette (FRA)	3	1	2	2	4	−2	84	117	−33	1	
4	Bartłomiej Mróz (POL)	3	0	3	0	6	−6	80	126	−46	0	

Source: TOCOG

Date	Time	Player 1	Score	Player 2	Set 1	Set 2	Set 3
1 Sep	19:20	Dheva Anrimusthi (Indonesia)	2–0	(Indonesia) Suryo Nugroho	21–7	21–7	
1 Sep	19:20	Bartłomiej Mróz (Poland)	0–2	(France) Méril Loquette	16–21	17–21	
2 Sep	15:20	Suryo Nugroho (Indonesia)	2–0	(Poland) Bartłomiej Mróz	21–13	21–10	
2 Sep	15:20	Dheva Anrimusthi (Indonesia)	2–0	(France) Méril Loquette	21–10	21–10	
3 Sep	12:20	Dheva Anrimusthi (Indonesia)	2–0	(Poland) Bartłomiej Mróz	21–17	21–7	
3 Sep	12:20	Suryo Nugroho (Indonesia)	2–0	(France) Méril Loquette	21–14	21–8	

=== Group B ===
Pos	Team	Pld	W	L	GF	GA	GD	PF	PA	PD	Pts	Qualification
1	Cheah Liek Hou (MAS)	3	3	0	6	0	+6	126	58	+68	3	Advance to semi-finals
2	Fang Jen-yu (TPE)	3	2	1	4	3	+1	123	97	+26	2	Advance to semi-finals
3	Taiyo Imai (JPN) (H)	3	1	2	3	4	−1	120	110	+10	1	
4	Ahmed Eldakrory (EGY)	3	0	3	0	6	−6	22	126	−104	0	

Source: TOCOG
(H) Host

Date	Time	Player 1	Score	Player 2	Set 1	Set 2	Set 3
1 Sep	20:00	Taiyo Imai (Japan)	1–2	(Chinese Taipei) Fang Jen-yu	16–21	21–17	10–21
1 Sep	20:00	Cheah Liek Hou (Malaysia)	2–0	(Egypt) Ahmed Eldakrory	21–3	21–2	
2 Sep	16:00	Taiyo Imai (Japan)	2–0	(Egypt) Ahmed Eldakrory	21–5	21–4	
2 Sep	16:00	Cheah Liek Hou (Malaysia)	2–0	(Chinese Taipei) Fang Jen-yu	21–13	21–9	
3 Sep	13:00	Cheah Liek Hou (Malaysia)	2–0	(Japan) Taiyo Imai	21–19	21–12	
3 Sep	13:00	Fang Jen-yu (Chinese Taipei)	2–0	(Egypt) Ahmed Eldakrory	21–6	21–2	

== Finals ==
The knockout stage was played on 4 September.

Semi-finals
A1	Dheva Anrimusthi (INA)	21	21
A2	Suryo Nugroho (INA)	13	15
B2	Fang Jen-yu (TPE)	21	10	16
B1	Cheah Liek Hou (MAS)	15	21	21

Gold medal match
A1	Dheva Anrimusthi (INA) (silver)	17	15
B1	Cheah Liek Hou (MAS) (gold)	21	21
Bronze medal match
A2	Suryo Nugroho (INA) (bronze)	21	21
B2	Fang Jen-yu (TPE)	16	9
