= Saudi Arabia at the 2016 Summer Paralympics =

- IPC code: KSA
- NPC: Paralympic Committee of Saudi Arabia

in Rio de Janeiro
- Competitors: 3 in 1 sports
- Medals Ranked 76th: Gold 0 Silver 0 Bronze 1 Total 1

Summer Paralympics appearances (overview)
- 1996; 2000; 2004; 2008; 2012; 2016; 2020; 2024

Saudi Arabia competed at the 2016 Summer Paralympics in Rio de Janeiro, Brazil, from 7 September to 18 September 2016.

== Disability classifications ==
Every participant at the Paralympics has their disability grouped into one of five disability categories; amputation, the condition may be congenital or sustained through injury or illness; cerebral palsy; wheelchair athletes, there is often overlap between this and other categories; visual impairment, including blindness; Les autres, any physical disability that does not fall strictly under one of the other categories, for example dwarfism or multiple sclerosis. Each Paralympic sport then has its own classifications, dependent upon the specific physical demands of competition. Events are given a code, made of numbers and letters, describing the type of event and classification of the athletes competing. Some sports, such as athletics, divide athletes by both the category and severity of their disabilities, other sports, for example swimming, group competitors from different categories together, the only separation being based on the severity of the disability.

== Medallists ==
Medal	Name	Sport	Event	Date
Bronze	Hani Alnakhli	Athletics	Men's Shot Put F33	10 September

== Athletics ==
Men's Track

Athlete	Events	Heat		Final	
Athlete	Events	Time	Rank	Time	Rank
Fahad Alganaidl	100 m T53	15.08	2 Q	15.35	8

Men's Field

Athlete	Events	Result	Rank
Asaad Sharaheli	Long Jump F20	5.96	11
Hani Alnakhli	Shot Put F33	8.99	3rd place, bronze medalist(s)

== See also ==
- Saudi Arabia at the 2016 Summer Olympics
