= Saudi Arabia at the 2008 Summer Paralympics =

- IPC code: KSA
- NPC: Paralympic Committee of Saudi Arabia

in Beijing
- Competitors: 3 in 2 sports
- Medals Ranked 48th: Gold 1 Silver 1 Bronze 0 Total 2

Summer Paralympics appearances (overview)
- 1996; 2000; 2004; 2008; 2012; 2016; 2020; 2024

Saudi Arabia sent a delegation to compete at the 2008 Summer Paralympics in Beijing, People's Republic of China.

== Medallists ==
Medal	Name	Sport	Event	Date
Gold	Osamah Alshanqiti	Athletics	Men's triple jump F12	8th
Silver	Osamah Alshanqiti	Athletics	Men's long Jump F12	

== Sports ==
=== Athletics ===
==== Men's track ====
Athlete	Class	Event	Heats		Final	
Athlete	Class	Event	Result	Rank	Result	Rank
Saeed Alkhaldi	T46	100m	11.25	8 q	11.36	6
Saeed Alkhaldi	T46	200m	23.50	14	did not advance	

==== Men's field ====
Athlete	Class	Event	Final		
Athlete	Class	Event	Result	Points	Rank
Osamah Alshanqiti	F12	Long jump	7.06	-	2nd place, silver medalist(s)
Osamah Alshanqiti	F12	Triple jump	15.37	-	1st place, gold medalist(s)

=== Powerlifting ===
Athlete	Event	Result	Rank
Hussain Alnoweser	75kg	195.0	6

== See also ==
- Saudi Arabia at the Paralympics
- Saudi Arabia at the 2008 Summer Olympics
