= Saudi Arabia at the 2004 Summer Paralympics =

- IPC code: KSA
- NPC: Paralympic Committee of Saudi Arabia

in Athens
- Competitors: 6 in 2 sports
- Flag bearer: Bassam Al Hawal
- Medals: Gold 0 Silver 0 Bronze 0 Total 0

Summer Paralympics appearances (overview)
- 1996; 2000; 2004; 2008; 2012; 2016; 2020; 2024

Saudi Arabia competed at the 2004 Summer Paralympics in Athens, Greece. The team included six athletes, all of them men, and won no medals.

== Sports ==
=== Athletics ===
==== Men's track ====
Athlete	Class	Event	Heats		Semifinal		Final	
Athlete	Class	Event	Result	Rank	Result	Rank	Result	Rank
Omar Al Rashidi	T13	100m	11.73	13	did not advance			
Abdulhadi Al Yousef	T12	100m	11.55	17	did not advance			
Abdulhadi Al Yousef	T12	200m	23.64	12	did not advance			

==== Men's field ====
Athlete	Class	Event	Final		
Athlete	Class	Event	Result	Points	Rank
Abdulhadi Al Yousef	F13	Long jump	6.14	-	17

=== Powerlifting ===
Athlete	Event	Result	Rank
Ibrahim Al Brahim	52kg	130.0	9
Bassam Al Hawal	100kg	195.0	7
Hussein Al Hejji	75kg	187.5	7
Abdulmonem Al Najar	90kg	165.0	12

== See also ==
- Saudi Arabia at the Paralympics
- Saudi Arabia at the 2004 Summer Olympics
