= Neil Shaw =

British businessman

Sir Neil McGowan Shaw KBE
- Born: May 31, 1929; Montreal, Quebec, Canada
- Died: March 18, 2023 (aged 93); United Kingdom
- Occupation: Business executive
- Known for: Former chief executive of Tate & Lyle and chairman of Lloyd's of London
- Spouse: Audrey Robinson (m. 1952; div. 1980) Elizabeth "Pixie" Mudge-Massey (m. 1985)
- Children: 5

Sir Neil Shaw (31 May 1929 – 18 March 2023) was a Canadian-born British businessman, who led Tate & Lyle (T&L) and the Lloyd's of London. He was knighted in 1994 for his contributions to the food industry and community service.

== Early life and education ==
Neil McGowan Shaw was born in Montreal, Quebec, in 1929 to Major Harold Leroy Shaw and his French-born wife, Fabiola (née McGowan). Raised bilingually in French and English, he attended Lower Canada College.

The family's circumstances changed when his father's illness forced a move from Montreal to the village of Knowlton. Following his father's death, Shaw left school to work as a bank teller at the Royal Bank of Canada.

== Career ==
=== Tate & Lyle ===
In 1955, Shaw began his career in the sugar industry as an executive assistant at Canada and Dominion Sugar, later acquired by Tate & Lyle. He relocated to the UK in 1963 and became a T&L director in 1975.

Appointed group chief executive in 1981, Shaw took control of T&L when its market value had shrunk to £60 million. He initiated a major turnaround by closing the company's 110-year-old Liverpool refinery, divesting from an unprofitable artificial sweetener venture named Zymaise, and expanding into the US corn syrup and sugar markets. Although attempted acquisitions of Brooke Bond and the British Sugar Corporation were unsuccessful, Shaw's leadership saw T&L's valuation grow to £2 billion by the time he retired.

During his tenure, Shaw oversaw the company's shift toward research-based food ingredients. This resulted in the 1991 launch of the low-calorie sweetener Sucralose, marketed as Splenda. A staunch defender of sugar, which he called a "natural food," Shaw often dismissed criticism of its health effects, noting a teaspoon contained only 16 calories.

=== Lloyd's of London ===
From 1992 to 1994, Shaw served as chairman of the Association of Lloyd’s Members. As a longtime individual investor, or "name," he addressed the market's severe financial crisis, which threatened thousands of members with bankruptcy. Describing Lloyd's as an organisation susceptible to "hucksters," he successfully advocated for the introduction of corporate capital to stabilise the market in 1993 before stepping down due to the demanding workload.

== Personal life ==
Shaw's first marriage was in 1952 to Audrey Robinson, with whom he had five children: David, Michael, Andrea, Cynthia, and Toni. The couple divorced in 1980. In 1985, he married the sculptor Elizabeth "Pixie" Mudge-Massey, who survives him along with his children.
