= Nazmiye Muslu Muratlı =

Turkish Paralympic powerlifter

Nazmiye Muratlı
Personal information
- Full name: Nazmiye Muslu Muratlı
- Nationality: Turkish
- Born: Nazmiye Muslu; 13 June 1979 (age 47) Konya, Turkey
- Home town: Meram, Konya Province, Turkey
- Weight: 40 kg (88 lb) (2012)

Sport
- Country: Turkey
- Sport: Powerlifting
- Event: 41kg
- Club: Konya Meram Belediyespor

Achievements and titles
- Paralympic finals: 2008, 2012, 2016
- Highest world ranking: 8
- Personal best: 109kg lift WR
Medal record
Women's powerlifting
Representing Turkey
Paralympic Games
Gold medal – first place	2012 London	−40 kg
Gold medal – first place	2016 Rio	−41 kg
Bronze medal – third place	2024 Paris	–45 kg
World Championships
Gold medal – first place	2014 Dubai	−40 kg

Nazmiye Muslu Muratlı (born Nazmiye Muslu, 13 June 1979), also known as Nazmiye Muratlı, is a Turkish female powerlifter. She is the current world record holder in 40 kg division, set at the 2012 Paralympics, where she took the gold medal. She competes for Konya Meram Belediyespor.

== Results ==
Paralympic Games

1 –41 kg 2016 Rio de Janeiro, BRA 104

1 –40 kg 2012 London, GBR 106

4 –40 kg 2008 Beijing, CHN 90.0

World Championships

1 –41 kg 2014 Dubai, UAE 103.0

1 –40 kg 2010 Kuala Lumpur, MAS 105.0

2 –45 kg 2019 Nur-Sultan, KAZ 116.0

2 –45 kg 2017 Mexico City, MEX 107.0

8 –44 kg 2006 Busan, KOR 60.0

European Open Championships

1 –50 kg 2018 Berck-sur-Mer, FRA 111

== Early years ==
Nazmiye Muslu was born in Konya in 1979. A paraplegic and dependent on wheelchair, she completed her primary education in her hometown.

She began powerlifting by chance through a friend, who insisted she come with her to the workouts. She abandoned the trainings in the beginnings since it was very hard for her. However, her mother and later her father convinced Nazmiye to resume the training activities.

== Career history ==
Only three months after her beginning again with powerlifting, she was admitted to the national team, and was taken to the European championship held in Portugal without her family's and even her own knowledge before. She took the bronze medal at her international debut.

Muratlı was national champion in 2005 and 2006. She won a bronze medal in 2005 and a gold medal in 2007 at the European championship.

At the 2008 Paralympics in Beijing, China, Muratlı became fourth. At the 2012 London Paralympics, she broke her own world record with 109.0 kg lift and took the gold medal. Lifting 104.0 kg in the 41 kg event at the 2016 Rio Paralympics, she set a world record and captured the gold medal. She became so Turkey's first ever sportsperson to win a gold medal in two Paralympics.

At the 2024 Summer Paralympics, Muratlı competed in the women's 45 kg event and won the bronze medal with a lift of 108 kg.
