= Ahmed Al-Sharbatly =

Saudi Arabian equestrian (born 1980)

Ahmed Sharbatly
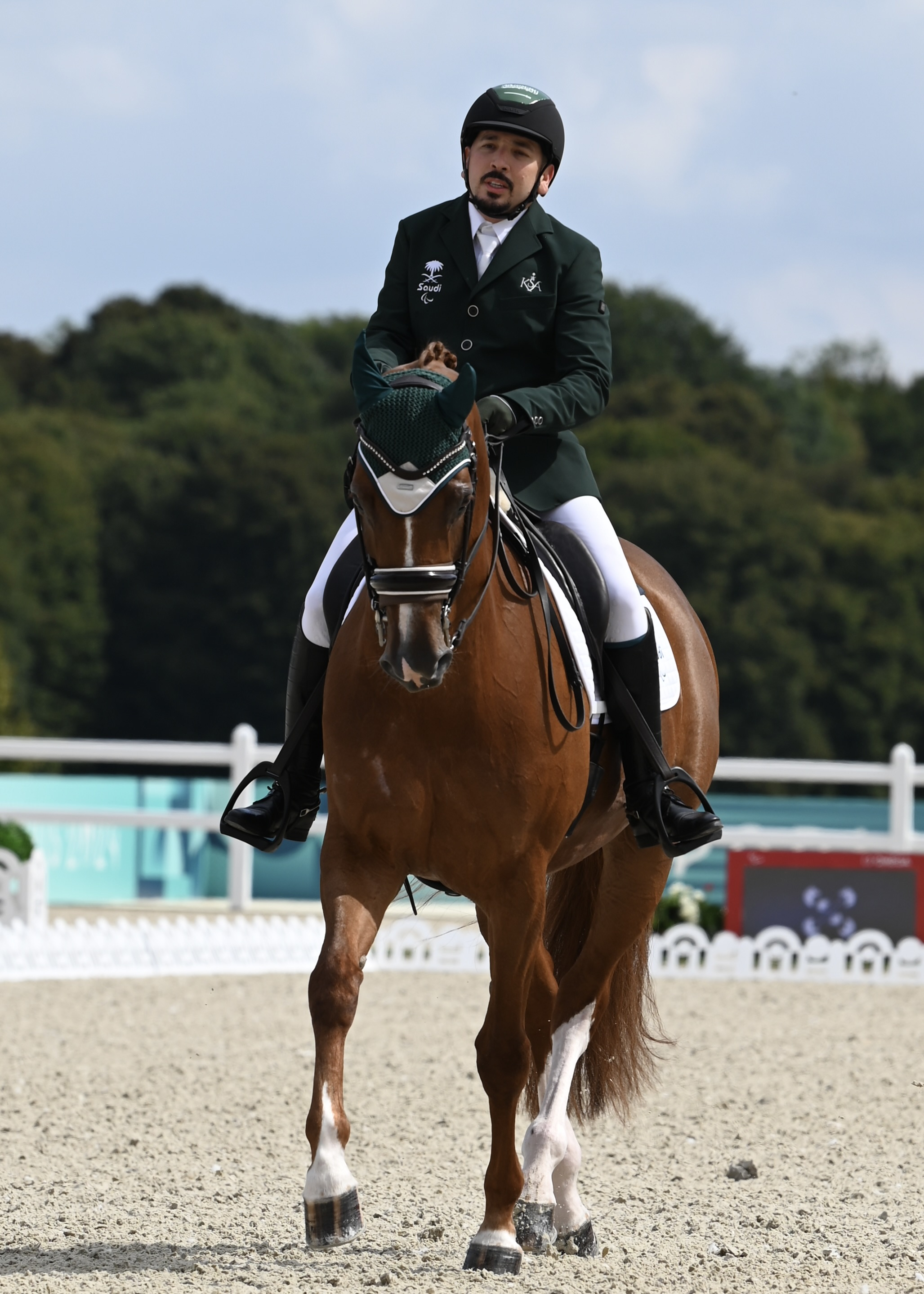
- Ahmed Sharbatly at the 2024 Paralympics.

Personal information
- Full name: Ahmed Adnan Hasan Sharbatly
- Nationality: Saudi Arabian
- Born: 4 December 1980 (age 45) Riyadh, Saudi Arabia

Sport
- Country: Saudi Arabia
- Sport: Para-equestrian

Achievements and titles
- Paralympic finals: Tokyo 2020; Paris 2024

Ahmed Al-Sharbatly (Arabic: أحمد الشربتلي; born 4 December 1980, Riyadh, Saudi Arabia) is a Saudi Arabian Paralympic equestrian. He competed at the 2020 Paralympic Games and the 2024 Paralympic Games, being the first and only Saudi Arabian para-equestrian rider to date. He also competed at the 2018 FEI World Equestrian Games in Tryon, North Carolina and the World Championships in Herning 2022 and Aachen 2026. He competes in the Grade V division, which is classified as the least impaired classification category.

He has been selected to represent the Saudi Arabian team at the 2026 Asian Games in Tokyo, which will be his first Championship in the abled-body category. He was also selected to represent his country at the 2022 Asian Games, but his horse did not passed the veterinary inspection.

== Family ==
His cousin is Abdullah Al-Sharbatly, who bronze at the 2012 Olympic Games.

== See also ==
- Horses in Saudi Arabia
