= Saudi Arabia at the 2020 Summer Paralympics =

- IPC code: KSA
- NPC: Paralympic Committee of Saudi Arabia

in Tokyo
- Competitors: 7 in 3 sports
- Medals: Gold 0 Silver 0 Bronze 1 Total 1

Summer Paralympics appearances (overview)
- 1996; 2000; 2004; 2008; 2012; 2016; 2020; 2024

Saudi Arabia competed at the 2020 Summer Paralympics in Tokyo, Japan, from 24 August to 5 September 2021.

== Medalists ==
Medal	Name	Sport	Event	Date
Bronze	Abdulrahman Al-Qurashi	Athletics	Men's 100 metres T53	1 September

== Athletics ==
One Saudi Arabian male athlete, Abdulrahman Al-Qurashi (100m T53), qualified for the 2020 Paralympics after breaking the qualification limit. During the games, he won a bronze medal.

== Equestrian ==
Saudi Arabia sent one qualified equestrian athlete.

== See also ==
- Saudi Arabia at the Paralympics
- Saudi Arabia at the 2020 Summer Olympics
