= Hani Alnakhli =

Saudi Arabian athlete

Personal information
- Nationality: Saudi Arabian
- Born: Hani Alnakhli; March 14, 1986 (age 40)

Sport
- Country: Saudi Arabia
- Sport: Athletics
- Disability: Cerebral Palsy
- Disability class: F33

Achievements and titles
- Paralympic finals: London 2012
Medal record
Men's athletics
Representing Saudi Arabia
Paralympic Games
Silver medal – second place	2012 London	Discus throw F32–34
Bronze medal – third place	2016 Rio de Janeiro	Discus throw F32–34
World Championships
Bronze medal – third place	2013 Lyon	Discus throw F32–34
Asian Para Games
Gold medal – first place	2010 Guangzhou	Discus throw F32–34
Gold medal – first place	2014 Incheon	Discus throw F32/33
Gold medal – first place	2014 Incheon	Shot put F33
Silver medal – second place	2010 Guangzhou	Shot put F32-33
Silver medal – second place	2018 Jakarta	Shot put F33
Silver medal – second place	2022 Hangzhou	Shot put F33
Bronze medal – third place	2010 Guangzhou	Javelin throw F33-34
Islamic Solidarity Games
Gold medal – first place	2025 Riyadh	Discus Throw F33/F34
- Updated on 17 November 2025

Hani Hussain Alnakhli (born 14 March 1986) is a Saudi Arabian athlete who competes in disability athletics in the F33 category.

== Career ==
In Guangzhou for the 2010 Asian Para Games, Alnakhli won the gold medal in a combined F32–34 class for the discus and set a new world record for the F33 category. At the 2011 Paralympic World Cup in Manchester, Alnakhli broke his world F33 record for the discus.

Alnakhli again broke his world record at the London Paralympic Games as he won silver in a combined F32/33/34 class. At the 2013 World championships, Alnakhli set a championship record for the F33 class but had to settle for bronze in a combined F32–34 event.
