= Saptoyogo Purnomo =

Indonesian Paralympic sprinter

Personal information
- Nationality: Indonesian
- Born: 17 September 1998 (age 28) Purwokerto, Central Java, Indonesia

Sport
- Country: Indonesia
- Sport: Paralympic athletics
- Disability class: T37
- Event: Sprint
Medal record
Men's para athletics
Representing Indonesia
Paralympic Games
Silver medal – second place	2024 Paris	100 m T37
Bronze medal – third place	2020 Tokyo	100 m T37
World Championships
Silver medal – second place	2023 Paris	100 m T37
Silver medal – second place	2025 New Delhi	4×100 m universal relay
Bronze medal – third place	2019 Dubai	100 m T37
Bronze medal – third place	2023 Paris	200 m T37
Bronze medal – third place	2024 Kobe	100 m T37
Bronze medal – third place	2024 Kobe	200 m T37
Bronze medal – third place	2025 New Delhi	100 m T37
World Abilitysport Games
Gold medal – first place	2023 Nakhon Ratchasima	100 m T37/38
Asian Para Games
Gold medal – first place	2018 Jakarta	100 m T37
Gold medal – first place	2018 Jakarta	200 m T37
Gold medal – first place	2022 Hangzhou	100 m T37
Gold medal – first place	2022 Hangzhou	200 m T37
Gold medal – first place	2022 Hangzhou	400 m T37
Silver medal – second place	2026 Aichi–Nagoya	100 m T37
Silver medal – second place	2026 Aichi–Nagoya	200 m T37
Silver medal – second place	2026 Aichi–Nagoya	400 m T37
Bronze medal – third place	2018 Jakarta	4×100 m universal relay
ASEAN Para Games
Gold medal – first place	2017 Kuala Lumpur	100 m T38
Gold medal – first place	2017 Kuala Lumpur	200 m T38
Gold medal – first place	2022 Surakarta	100 m T37
Gold medal – first place	2022 Surakarta	200 m T36/T37
Gold medal – first place	2023 Cambodia	100 m T37
Gold medal – first place	2023 Cambodia	200 m T36/T37
Silver medal – second place	2017 Kuala Lumpur	Long jump T38
Asian Youth Para Games
Silver medal – second place	2017 Dubai	100 m T38
Silver medal – second place	2017 Dubai	200 m T38
Silver medal – second place	2017 Dubai	Long jump T38
- Updated on 25 October 2023

Saptoyogo Purnomo (born 17 September 1998) is an Indonesian Paralympic sprinter. He won a silver medal in the 100 meter T37 event at 2024 Paris Summer Paralympics and a bronze medal in the 100 meter T37 event at 2020 Tokyo Summer Paralympics.
