= Ariosvaldo Fernandes =

Brazilian Paralympic athlete (born 1976)

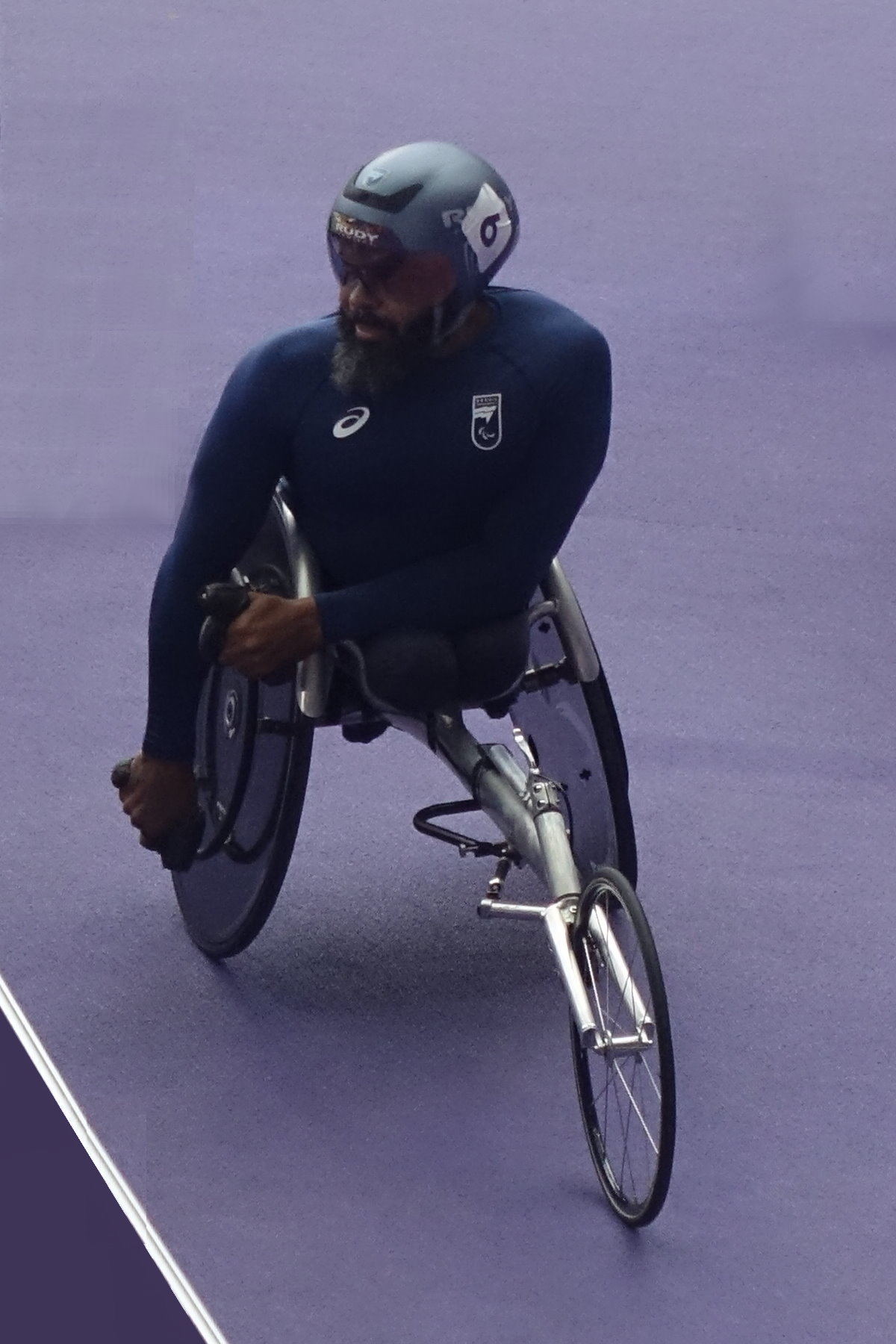
- Fernandes at the 2024 Summer Paralympics

Personal information
- Full name: Ariosvaldo Fernandes da Silva
- Born: 23 December 1976 (age 49) Campina Grande, Brazil

Sport
- Sport: Para-athletics
- Disability class: T53
- Event: Wheelchair racing
Medal record
Men's para-athletics
Representing Brazil
Paralympic Games
Bronze medal – third place	2024 Paris	100 m T53
World Championships
Silver medal – second place	2024 Kobe	100 m T53
Bronze medal – third place	2013 Lyon	100 m T53
Bronze medal – third place	2023 Paris	100 m T53
Parapan American Games
Gold medal – first place	2007 Rio de Janeiro	100 m T53
Gold medal – first place	2007 Rio de Janeiro	400m T53
Gold medal – first place	2011 Guadalajara	100 m T53
Gold medal – first place	2011 Guadalajara	200 m T53
Gold medal – first place	2019 Lima	100 m T53
Gold medal – first place	2019 Lima	400 m T53
Gold medal – first place	2023 Santiago	100 m T53
Gold medal – first place	2023 Santiago	400 m T53
Silver medal – second place	2007 Rio de Janeiro	200 m T53
Silver medal – second place	2011 Guadalajara	400 m T53
Silver medal – second place	2015 Toronto	100 m T53
Silver medal – second place	2015 Toronto	400 m T53

Ariosvaldo Fernandes da Silva (born 23 December 1976) is a Brazilian T53 wheelchair racer.

== Career ==
Fernandes represented Brazil at the five Parapan American Games and winning gold medals in the 100 metres and 400 metres T53 events.

In May 2024, he competed at the 2024 World Para Athletics Championships and won a silver medal in the 100 metres T53 event. He then represented Brazil at the 2024 Summer Paralympics and won a bronze medal in the 100 metres T53 event.
