= Agus Ngaimin =

Indonesian Paralympic swimmer

Personal information
- Nationality: Indonesian
- Born: 17 August 1984 (age 41); Cilacap, Indonesia

Sport
- Country: Indonesia
- Sport: S6 Swimming
- Updated on 17 July 2012

Agus Ngaimin (also Agus Ngaiman; born 17 August 1984) is an Indonesian Paralympic swimmer.

== Biography ==
Ngaimin was born in Cilacap, Central Java on 17 August 1984. At the age of two he was struck by polio, which left him paralysed from the waist down.

Ngaimin first competed at the national level in 2004 at the age of 20, during the 12th annual National Disabled Sports Week (Pekan Olahraga Cacat Nasional) in Palembang, winning a gold medal. He used his financial reward for the win to improve his training, while part of it was set aside for land investment. He generally competes in the 100-metre event, and in the S6 Class, defined by Jane Buckley of Sporting Wheelies as full use of arms and hands, as well as some trunk control, but no useful leg muscles; the class also includes "Swimmers with coordination problems ... Swimmers with major limb loss of 2 limbs; Little People / Dwarfs."

Ngaimin won a gold medal at the 2006 FESPIC Games in Kuala Lumpur, Malaysia. At the 2010 Asian Para Games in Guangzhou, Ngaimin won a silver. At the 2011 ASEAN ParaGames in Surakarta, Ngaimin won five gold medals. The national team's manager, Dimin BA, described Ngaimin as one of the team's more dependable athletes. During the competition he set a regional record for the S6 100-metre freestyle event.

In June 2012 he began training to represent Indonesia at the 2012 Summer Paralympics in London, together with two other athletics competitors, a powerlifter, a swimmer, and a table tennis player; As of 16 July 2012 Ngaimin had been selected after his performance in Guangzhou. Ngaiman is one of three athletes confirmed to be participating in the Paralympics: the other two are Ni Nengah Widiasih (powerlifting), and David Jacobs (table tennis). As of 21 May 2012, he has one child.
