= Abdulrahman Al-Qurashi =

Saudi Arabian Paralympic athlete

Personal information
- Born: 25 December 1997 (age 28)

Sport
- Country: Saudi Arabia
- Sport: Para-athletics
- Disability: Hemiplegia
- Disability class: T53
Medal record
Men's para-athletics
Representing Saudi Arabia
Paralympic Games
Gold medal – first place	2024 Paris	100 m T53
Bronze medal – third place	2020 Tokyo	100 m T53
World Championships
Silver medal – second place	2025 New Delhi	100 m T53
Asian Para Games
Gold medal – first place	2022 Hangzhou	100 m T53
Bronze medal – third place	2022 Hangzhou	400 m T53

Abdulrahman Al-Qurashi (Arabic: عبد الرحمن القرشي; born 25 December 1997) is a Saudi Arabian Paralympic athlete.

== Career ==
He won the bronze medal in the men's 100 metres T53 event at the 2020 Summer Paralympics held in Tokyo, Japan. He was the only competitor to win a medal for Saudi Arabia at the 2020 Summer Paralympics.
