= Osamah Al-Shanqiti =

Saudi Arabian Paralympic athlete

Medal record

Representing Saudi Arabia

Men's Athletics (F12)

Paralympic Games
Gold medal – first place	2008 Beijing	Triple jump
Silver medal – second place	2008 Beijing	Long jump

Osamah Al Shanqiti of Saudi Arabia during the Men's Long jump, 2013.

Osamah Alshanqiti is a Saudi Arabian Paralympian athlete who competes in triple jump and high jump.

He represented Saudi Arabia at the 2008 Summer Paralympics in Beijing, and won his country's first ever Olympic or Paralympic gold medal, with a world record jump of 15.37 metres in the F12 triple jump event.
