= Ni Nengah Widiasih =

Indonesian Paralympic powerlifter

Personal information
- Nationality: Indonesian
- Born: 12 December 1992 (age 33) Karangasem, Bali, Indonesia

Sport
- Country: Indonesia
- Sport: Powerlifting
- Event: 40 kilogram class
Medal record
Women's para powerlifting
Representing Indonesia
Paralympic Games
Silver medal – second place	2020 Tokyo	–41 kg
Bronze medal – third place	2016 Rio de Janeiro	–41 kg
World Championships
Bronze medal – third place	2014 Dubai	−41 kg
World Cup
Gold medal – first place	2016 Kuala Lumpur	−41 kg
Gold medal – first place	2019 Eger	−41 kg
Gold medal – first place	2021 Bangkok	−41 kg
Silver medal – second place	2019 Dubai	−45 kg
Bronze medal – third place	2021 Dubai	−41 kg
European Open Championships
Gold medal – first place	2018 Berck-sur-Mer	−45 kg
Asia-Oceania Open Championships
Silver medal – second place	2018 Kitakyushu	−45 kg
Silver medal – second place	2022 Pyeongtaek	−41 kg
Asian Para Games
Silver medal – second place	2014 Incheon	−41 kg
Silver medal – second place	2018 Jakarta	−41 kg
Silver medal – second place	2022 Hangzhou	−45 kg
Silver medal – second place	2026 Aichi–Nagoya	Mixed team
Bronze medal – third place	2026 Aichi–Nagoya	−41 kg
Asian Championships
Silver medal – second place	2010 Kuala Lumpur	−40 kg
Silver medal – second place	2015 Almaty	−41 kg
ASEAN Para Games
Gold medal – first place	2011 Surakarta	−40 kg
Gold medal – first place	2013 Naypydaw	−40 kg
Gold medal – first place	2015 Singapore	−41 kg
Gold medal – first place	2017 Kuala Lumpur	−45 kg
Gold medal – first place	2022 Surakarta	−45 kg (best)
Gold medal – first place	2022 Surakarta	−45 kg (total)
Gold medal – first place	2023 Cambodia	−45 kg (best)
Gold medal – first place	2023 Cambodia	−45 kg (total)
Silver medal – second place	2009 Kuala Lumpur	−40 kg
Bronze medal – third place	2008 Nakhon Ratchasima	−40 kg

Ni Nengah Widiasih (born 12 December 1992) is an Indonesian powerlifter. She competed in the 2012 Summer Paralympics, 2016 Summer Paralympics and 2020 Summer Paralympics.

== Career ==
Widiasih was born and raised in Karangasem, Bali. She lost use of her legs at age four and began using a wheelchair. When she was in the sixth grade she began living at the dormitory run by the Disabled Children's Counselling Foundation (Yayasan Pembinaan Anak Cacat). Her daily expenses were handled by the foundation, and, beginning in middle school, her education was paid for through scholarships. As of 2012, she was in the second year of senior high school.

At the suggestion of her brother, fellow weightlifter I Gede Suantaka, Widiasih took up weightlifting. She began practising four to five times weekly. In 2008, she won a bronze medal at the ASEAN ParaGames in Nakhon Ratchasima, while the following year she received a silver medal at the Games in Kuala Lumpur. She also medaled at national level competitions in Surakarta and Bali. She competes in the 40 kilogram class.

Widiasih competed at the 2011 ASEAN ParaGames, held in Surakarta in December, after her class was nearly cut by a referee as "illegitimate". She set a record for the 40 kilogram class, lifting 87 kilograms (191.8 lb) after failing to lift 80 kilograms (176.4 lb) in an earlier attempt; the previous record was 85 kilograms (187.4 lb). This effort also won her a gold medal. For the games she was coached by Agus Sugiharto. In February 2012 she won a bronze medal at the Malaysia Open Powerlifting Championship in Kuala Lumpur.

Widiasih was on the six-member shortlist to compete in the 2012 Summer Paralympics in London; in June it was announced that she would be one of three athletes competing, along with David Jacobs (table tennis) and an athletics competitor. She was the only one from the country who competed in powerlifting; she competed in the 40 kilogram class.
