= National Paralympic Committee of Indonesia =

National Paralympic Committee
- Country: Indonesia
- Code: INA
- Created: 31 October 1962 as Yayasan Pembina Olahraga Cacat
- Continental association: APC
- Headquarters: Surakarta, Indonesia
- President: Senny Marbun
- Website: www.npcindonesia.org

National Paralympic Committee of Indonesia is Indonesia's National Paralympic Committee—the body responsible for selecting athletes to represent Indonesia at the Paralympic Games and other international athletic meets and for managing the Indonesian teams at the events. It was created on 31 October 1962 as the Disabled Sports Founder Foundation (Indonesian: Yayasan Pembina Olahraga Cacat; abbreviated YPOC) before changing the name during its 7th National Sports Conference on 31 October and 1 November 1993 to Disabled Sports Founder Agency (Indonesian: Badan Pembina Olahraga Cacat; abbreviated BPOC). This name was changed to its current on 26 July 2010.

Since 1992, NPC Indonesia was a part of the National Sports Committee of Indonesia until split off as independent organization in 2015.

Its president is Senny Marbun. Its headquarters is located in Surakarta, Central Java.
