= Kyrgyzstan at the 2026 Asian Para Games =

- Flag of Kyrgyzstan
- IPC code: KGZ
- NPC: Kyrgyz National Paralympic Committee
- Website: https://www.paralympic.org/npc/kyrgyzstan

in Aichi-Nagoya, Japan 18 October 2026 – 24 October 2026
- Competitors: 16 (8 men and 8 women) in 5 sports
- Medals Ranked 22nd: Gold 1 Silver 0 Bronze 0 Total 1

Asian Para Games appearances
- 2010; 2014; 2018; 2022; 2026

Kyrgyzstan is participating in the 2026 Asian Para Games, in Nagoya, Aichi Prefecture, Japan, from 18 to 24 October 2026. This is Kyrgyzstan's fifth appearance at the Games.

17-year old athlete Aibike Ulanbek Kyzy won Gold medal for Kyrgyzstan in Para Judo (Women's J2 -52 kg category).

== Medalists ==
Medal	Athlete	Sport	Event	Date
(gold) Gold	Aibike Ulanbek Kyzy	Judo	Women's J2 -52 kg	19 October

=== Summary ===
Medals by events
Sport	Gold	Silver	Bronze	Total
Judo	1	0	0	1
Total	1	0	0	0

Medals by day
Day	Date	Gold	Silver	Bronze	Total
1	19 October	1	0	0	1
2	20 October	0	0	0	0
3	21 October	0	0	0	0
4	22 October	0	0	0	0
5	23 October	0	0	0	0
6	24 October	0	0	0	0
Total		1	0	0	1

Medals by gender
Gender	Gold	Silver	Bronze	Total
Female	1	0	0	0
Male	0	0	0	0
Mixed	0	0	0	0
Total	1	0	0	1

Multiple medalists
Athlete	Event	1st place, gold medalist(s)	2nd place, silver medalist(s)	3rd place, bronze medalist(s)	Total

== Competitors ==
Following is the list of sports and number of athletes that represented Kyrgyzstan:

Sport	Men	Women	Total
Athletics	4	2	6
Boccia	-	1	1
Judo	2	3	5
Powerlifting	2	1	3
Swimming	-	1	1
Total	8	8	16

== Athletics ==
Six athletes (four men and two women) represented Kyrgyzstan in track and field events. Gulnaz Zhuzbaeva (Women's 1500m - T11) and Adilet Kamchybekov (Men's Shot Put F32) came close to clinching bronze medals and finished fourth.

Track events
Men

Athlete	Event	Class	Heat		Final	
Athlete	Event	Class	Result	Rank	Result	Rank
Zhalaldin Abduvaliev	1500 m	T11	4:59.84 SB	7 Q	4:54.70	5
Dastan Kamchybekov	1500 m	T11	4:59.53	6	Did not advance	
Zhalaldin Abduvaliev	5000 m	T11	-		18:49.93	7
Dastan Kamchybekov	5000 m	T11	-		18:47.56	6

Women

Athlete	Event	Class	Heat		Final	
Athlete	Event	Class	Result	Rank	Result	Rank
Gulnaz Zhuzbaeva	1500 m	T11	-		6:13.96 SB	4

Field events
Men

Athlete	Event	Class	Qualification		Final	
Athlete	Event	Class	Result	Rank	Result	Rank
Adilet Kamchybekov	Shot Put	F42	-		10.62	4
Arystanbek Bazarkulov	Shot Put	F34	-		8.52 SB	5

Women

Athlete	Event	Class	Qualification		Final	
Athlete	Event	Class	Result	Rank	Result	Rank
Adina Samyibek	Discus Throw	F56/F57	20.03	3 q PB	19.53	7
Adina Samyibek	Shot Put	F55/F56/F57	-		5.49	10

== Boccia ==
Zhazira Satybaldyeva was just 13 years old when she represented Kyrgyzstan in Boccia.

Athlete	Event	Group stage					Semifinals	Final / BM	
Athlete	Event	Opposition Score	Opposition Score	Opposition Score	Opposition Score	Rank	Opposition Score	Opposition Score	Rank
Zhazira Satybaldyeva	Women's Individual-BC2	Phromsiri (THA) L 2–7	Zayana (INA) L 0–20	Sorn (CAM) L 2–14	-	11	Did not advance		

== Judo ==
Five Judokas (2 men and 3 women) competed in this edition of the Games. 17-year old athlete Aibike Ulanbek Kyzy won Gold medal for Kyrgyzstan in Para Judo (Women's J2 -52 kg category).

Men

Athlete	Event	Round of 16	Quarterfinal	Semifinal	Repechage	Final / BM	
Athlete	Event	Opposition Result	Opposition Result	Opposition Result	Opposition Result	Opposition Result	Rank
Mamatibraim Suranov	J1 -70 kg	Zhu (CHN) L 000–103^{IPP}	-		Nurdauletov (KAZ) L 000–101^{IPP}	Did not advance	9
Baigazy Sultangaziev	J1 -70 kg	Baatarsuren (MGL) L 011–101^{IPP}	Did not advance				-

Women

Athlete	Event	Round of 16	Quarterfinal	Semifinal	Repechage	Final / BM	
Athlete	Event	Opposition Result	Opposition Result	Opposition Result	Opposition Result	Opposition Result	Rank
Aibike Ulanbek Kyzy	J2 -52 kg	-		Fujiwara (JPN) W 100–000^{IPP}	-	Kokila (IND) W 100–000^{IPP}	1st place, gold medalist(s)
Ferdauza Ulanbekovna Ubarikova	J1 -52 kg	-	Babaeva (UZB) L 000–100^{IPP}	-	Bauyrzhan (KAZ) W 002–001^{YUK}	Ubarikova (KAZ) L 100–000IPP	5
Aitunuk Kudaiberdieva	J2 -70 kg	-	Ogawa (JPN) L 000–100^{IPP}		Gulshan (IND) L 000–100^{IPP}	Did not advance	7

== Powerlifting ==
Three athletes (two men and one woman) competed in Powerlifting events. Esen Kaliev (in men's 65 kg) and Mirgul Bolotalieva (in women's 86kg) came close to clinching a bronze and finished fourth.

Men

Athlete	Event	Attempt 1	Attempt 2	Attempt 3	Total	Rank
Esen Kaliev	65 kg	168	173	175	175	4
Maskat Argymbaev	80 kg	173	~~177~~	~~177~~	173	7

Women

Athlete	Event	Attempt 1	Attempt 2	Attempt 3	Total	Rank
Mirgul Bolotalieva	86 kg	107	111	116	116	4

== Swimming ==
Azallia Iusurova was just 12 years old when she represented Kyrgyzstan in Swimming in 100m freestyle (S7).

Women

Athlete	Event	Heat		Final	
Athlete	Event	Result	Rank	Result	Rank
Azallia Iusurova	100 m Freestyle S7	1:52.05	10	Did not advance	
