= Macau at the 2026 Asian Para Games =

- Flag of Macau
- IPC code: MAC
- NPC: National Paralympic Committee of Macao, China
- Website: www.paralympic.org/npc/macao-china

in Aichi-Nagoya, Japan 18 October 2026 – 24 October 2026
- Competitors: 13 (5 men and 8 women) in 5 sports
- Medals: Gold 0 Silver 0 Bronze 0 Total 0

Asian Para Games appearances
- 2010; 2014; 2018; 2022; 2026

Macau participated in the 2026 Asian Para Games, in Nagoya, Aichi Prefecture, Japan, from 18 to 24 October 2026. This was Macau's fifth appearance at the Games.

Macau contingent included 24 members (including 13 athletes (5 men, 8 women), coaches, and the support staff) to compete in various categories across 5 sports. Macau could not win any medal in this edition of the Games.

Macau's youngest female athlete, Chi In Ng, was only 13 years of age, when she participated in this edition of the Games.

Macau's youngest male athlete, Kin Wong was only 14 years of age, when he participated in this edition of the Games.

== Medalists ==
Medal	Athlete	Sport	Event	Date

=== Summary ===
Medals by events
Sport	Gold	Silver	Bronze	Total
Total	0	0	0	0

Medals by day
Day	Date	Gold	Silver	Bronze	Total
1	19 October	0	0	0	0
2	20 October	0	0	0	0
3	21 October	0	0	0	0
4	22 October	0	0	0	0
5	23 October	0	0	0	0
6	24 October	0	0	0	0
Total		0	0	0	0

Medals by gender
Gender	Gold	Silver	Bronze	Total
Female	0	0	0	0
Male	0	0	0	0
Mixed	0	0	0	0
Total	0	0	0	0

== Competitors ==
Following is the list of sports and number of athletes that represented Macau. Macau's athletes participated in Para Athletics, Para Boccia, Para Fencing, Para Swimming, and Para Table Tennis.

Competitors
Sport	Men	Women	Total
Athletics	1	4	5
Boccia	-	1	1
Fencing	-	1	1
Swimming	2	-	2
Table tennis	2	2	4
Total	5	8	13

== Athletics ==
Five athletes (one man and four women) competed across track and field events. Macau's youngest athlete, Chi In Ng, was only 13 years of age, when she participated in this edition of the Games. The best result recorded was 5th position by Chi In Ng in 1500m (T20 category).

Track events
Men

Athlete	Event	Class	Heat		Final	
Athlete	Event	Class	Result	Rank	Result	Rank
Chi Fong Fong	400 m	T20	1:04.37	9	Did not advance	

Women

Athlete	Event	Class	Heat		Final	
Athlete	Event	Class	Result	Rank	Result	Rank
Sok Leng Chan	400 m	T20	1:13.73	9	Did not advance	
Chi In Ng	400 m	T20	1:15.59	10	Did not advance	
Chi In Ng	1500 m	T20	-		5:59.34	5

Field events
Women

Athlete	Event	Class	Heat		Final	
Athlete	Event	Class	Result	Rank	Result	Rank
Hao Lei Chio	Long Jump	T20	-		4.14	8
Hao Lei Chio	Shot Put	T20	-		5.66	7
Sing Tong Ng	Shot Put	F20	-		6.23	6

== Boccia ==
U Kei Tang, represented Macau in Boccia Women's Individual BC1 event. She's the bronze medal winner of the recently concluded World Para Future 2026.

She could not win any of her games in Group stage and ended her campaign, in this edition of the Games, at tenth position.

Athlete	Event	Group stage					Quarterfinals	Semifinals	Final	
Athlete	Event	Opposition Score	Opposition Score	Opposition Score	Opposition Score	Rank	Opposition Score	Opposition Score	Opposition Score	Rank
U Kei Tang	Women's Individual BC1	Handayani (INA) L 0–13	Kim (KOR) L 1–4	Melissa (MAS) L 0–9	Tsai (TPE) L 1–6	Did not advance				10

== Fencing ==
Lao In I represented Macau in Fencing Foil (Category A) and Sabre (Category A) events. She reached Round of 16 in both the events but could not qualify for semi-finals.

Player	Event	Group stage					Quarter-finals	Semi-finals	Final	
Player	Event	Opposition Score	Opposition Score	Opposition Score	Opposition Score	Rank	Opposition Score	Opposition Score	Opposition Score	Rank
Lao In I	Women's Foil Category A	Kimura (JPN) W 5–2	Thongdaeng (THA) W 5–3	Fan (HKG) W 5–2	Kim (KOR) L 4–5	-	Pengprasittipong (THA) L 1–15	Did not advance		10
Lao In I	Women's Sabre Category A	Matsumoto (JPN) L 1–5	Peng (CHN) L 2–5	Lamasano (INA) W 5–1	Garrucho (PHI) W 5–0	-	Lam (HKG) L 7–15	Did not advance		12

== Swimming ==
Two swimmers from Macau took part in various Swimming events. Kin Wong was only 14 years of age, when he participated in this edition of the Games. None of the swimmers could qualify for the final events.

Athlete	Event	Heat		Final	
Athlete	Event	Result	Rank	Result	Rank
Chi Hou Choi	Men's 100m Backstroke S14	1:14.33	13	Did not advance	
Chi Hou Choi	Men's 100m Butterfly S14	1:10.22	13	Did not advance	
Chi Hou Choi	Men's 200m Freestyle S14	2:21.95	11	Did not advance	
Kin Wong	Men's 100m Backstroke S14	1:19.82	14	Did not advance	
Kin Wong	Men's 100m Breaststroke SB14	1:39.50	15	Did not advance	

== Table tennis ==
Two women and two men represented Macau in Table Tennis. They all played Singles. None of them could qualify for knockouts.

Singles

Player	Event	Group stage					Quarter-finals	Semi-finals	Final	
Player	Event	Opposition Score	Opposition Score	Opposition Score	Opposition Score	Rank	Opposition Score	Opposition Score	Opposition Score	Rank
Nui Yan Mok	Women's C11	Wong (HKG) L 0–3	Li (TPE) L 2–3	Did not advance						
Choi Hong U	Women's C7	Chiu (HKG) L 1–3	Yang (KOR) L 1–3	Giniyatova (KAZ) L 1–3	Did not advance					
Cheng Lao Chu	Men's C2	Uno (JPN) L 0–3	Janfeshan (IRI) L 1–3	Did not advance						
Chi Keong IP	Men's C4-C5	Cheng (TPE) L 0–3	Layaba (INA) L 0–3	Did not advance						
