= Indonesia at the 2026 Asian Para Games =

- IPC code: INA
- NPC: National Paralympic Committee of Indonesia
- Website: https://npcindonesia.or.id

in Aichi–Nagoya 18–24 October 2026
- Competitors: 103 in 12 sports
- Flag bearers: Jaenal Aripin; Maria Goreti Samiyati
- Medals Ranked 8th: Gold 15 Silver 21 Bronze 37 Total 73

Asian Para Games appearances (overview)
- 2010; 2014; 2018; 2022; 2026

Youth appearances
- 2009; 2013; 2017; 2021

Indonesia participated in the 2026 Asian Para Games, to be held in Nagoya, Aichi Prefecture, Japan, from 18 to 24 October 2026. This will be Indonesia's fifth appearance at the Games. Indonesia fielded 105 athletes to compete at the Games.

== Background ==
=== Administration ===
National Paralympic Committee of Indonesia assigned Reda Manthovani, as chef de mission for the Indonesian contingent.

=== Flag bearers ===
Jaenal Aripin and Maria Goreti Samiyati (para cycling) were the Indonesian flag bearers at 2026 Asian Para Games opening ceremony.

== Competitor ==
Sport	Men	Women	Total
Para Archery	4	3	7
Para Athletics	15	10	25
Badminton	9	6	15
Boccia	3	2	5
Para Cycling	4	1	5
Para Judo	3	4	7
Powerlifting	4	6	10
Shooting Para Sports	0	3	3
Para Swimming	7	5	12
Para Table tennis	7	4	11
Para Taekwondo	0	2	2
Wheelchair fencing	2	1	3
Total	58	47	105

== Medal Summary ==
=== Medal by Date ===
Medals by date
Day	Date	1st place, gold medalist(s)	2nd place, silver medalist(s)	3rd place, bronze medalist(s)	Total
1	19 October	1	1	8	10
2	20 October	3	3	9	15
3	21 October	4	4	6	14
4	22 October	2	3	8	13
5	23 October	4	9	6	19
6	24 October	1	1	0	2
Total		15	21	37	73

=== Medal by sport ===
Medals by sport
Sport	Gold	Silver	Bronze	Total
Boccia	4	0	0	4
Athletics	3	8	11	22
Swimming	3	4	2	9
Badminton	3	3	6	12
Table tennis	1	0	6	7
Cycling	1	0	4	5
Archery	0	3	1	4
Powerlifting	0	2	5	7
Judo	0	1	2	3
Total	15	21	37	73

== Medalists ==
The following Indonesian competitors won medals at the Games.

No	Medal	Name	Sport	Event	Date
1	Gold	Maulana Rifky Yavianda	Para Swimming	Men's 100 m freestyle S12	19 October
2	Gold	I Kadek Dwi Purwana Yasa	Para Athletics	Men's discus throw F57	20 October
3	Gold	Muhammad Fadli Immammuddin	Para Cycling	Men's C4 4000 m individual pursuit	20 October
4	Gold	Maulana Rifky Yavianda	Para Swimming	Men's 100 m backstroke S12	20 October
5	Gold	Karisma Evi Tiarani	Para Athletics	Women's 100 m T63	21 October
6	Gold	Gischa Zayana	Boccia	Women's individual BC2	21 October
7	Gold	Handayani	Boccia	Women's individual BC1	21 October
8	Gold	Felix Ardi Yudha	Boccia	Men's individual BC2	21 October
9	Gold	Abdil Majid Rahman	Para Swimming	Men's 100 m breaststroke SB7	22 October
10	Gold	Barce Layaba; Leli Marlina	Para Table Tennis	Mixed doubles Class XD10	22 October
11	Gold	Leani Ratri Oktila; Hikmat Ramdani	Badminton	Mixed doubles SL3–SU5	23 October
12	Gold	Rina Marlina; Subhan	Badminton	Mixed doubles SH6	23 October
13	Gold	Muh Al Imran; Suryo Nugroho	Badminton	Men's doubles SL3–SU5	23 October
14	Gold	Partin	Para Athletics	Men's 100 m T63	23 October
15	Gold	Felix Ardi Yudha; Gischa Zayana; Muhamad Afrizal Syafa	Boccia	Mixed team BC1/BC2	24 October
1	Silver	Junaedi	Judo	Men's J1 –70 kg	19 October
2	Silver	Lia Priyanti	Para Athletics	Women's discus throw F43/44/64	20 October
3	Silver	Muhammad Ridho Alfares Putra	Para Athletics	Men's 100 m T36	20 October
4	Silver	Marcelino Michael	Para Athletics	Men's shot put F12	20 October
5	Silver	Arif Firmansyah; Ken Swagumilang	Para Archery	Men's doubles compound	21 October
6	Silver	Saptoyogo Purnomo	Para Athletics	Men's 100 m T37	21 October
7	Silver	Saptoyogo Purnomo	Para Athletics	Men's 400 m T37	21 October
8	Silver	Taufik Abdul Karim	Para Athletics	Men's 400 m T11	21 October
9	Silver	Teodora Audi Ayudia Ferelly; Ken Swagumilang	Para Archery	Mixed doubles compound	22 October
10	Silver	Mutriara Cantik Harsanto	Para Swimming	Women's 100 m breaststroke SB9	22 October
11	Silver	Maulana Rifky Yavianda	Para Swimming	Men's 50 m freestyle S13	22 October
12	Silver	Leani Ratri Oktila	Badminton	Women's singles SL4	23 October
13	Silver	Fredy Setiawan	Badminton	Men's singles SL4	23 October
14	Silver	Kholidin; Noviera Ross	Para Archery	Mixed doubles recurve	23 October
15	Silver	Rina Marlina; Apriliyana Sulistyawati	Badminton	Women's doubles SH6	23 October
16	Silver	Shebrioni; Siti Mahmudah; Sriyanti	Powerlifting	Women's team	23 October
17	Silver	Jendi Panggabean	Swimming	Men's 100 m backstroke S9	23 October
18	Silver	Maulana Rifky Yavianda	Swimming	Men's 100 m butterfly S12	23 October
19	Silver	Ansyari	Para Athletics	Men's javelin throw F40/41	23 October
20	Silver	Saptoyogo Purnomo	Para Athletics	Men's 200 m T37	23 October
21	Silver	Hilman; Ni Nengah Widiasih; Abdul Hadi	Powerlifting	Mixed team	24 October
1	Bronze	Ni Nengah Widiasih	Powerlifting	Women's -41 kg	19 October
2	Bronze	Sufyan Saori	Cycling	Men's C4-5 1000 m time trial	19 October
3	Bronze	Hilman	Powerlifting	Men's -54 kg	19 October
4	Bronze	Vanza Miftahul Jannah	Cycling	Women's B 4000 m individual pursuit	19 October
5	Bronze	Dhenny Marsyelina	Judo	Women's J1 –60 kg	19 October
6	Bronze	Hamida	Table tennis	Women's singles Class 8	19 October
7	Bronze	Karisma Evi Tiarani	Athletics	Women's long jump T42/63/64	19 October
8	Bronze	Theradina Audria Lie	Swimming	Women's 100 m freestyle S10	19 October
9	Bronze	Nanda Mei Sholihah	Athletics	Women's 200 m T47	20 October
10	Bronze	Alfin Nomleni	Athletics	Men's 400 m T20	20 October
11	Bronze	Rizal Bagus Saktyono	Athletics	Men's javelin throw F46	20 October
12	Bronze	Komet Akbar	Table tennis	Men's singles Class 10	20 October
13	Bronze	Barce Layaba	Table tennis	Men's singles Class 4–5	20 October
14	Bronze	Margono	Powerlifting	Men's -65 kg	20 October
15	Bronze	Shebrioni	Powerlifting	Women's -61 kg	20 October
16	Bronze	Fajar Pambudi	Judo	Men's J1 –95 kg	20 October
17	Bronze	Helin Wardina	Athletics	Women's 200 m T37	20 October
18	Bronze	Vitasari	Athletics	Women's 100 m T36	21 October
19	Bronze	Nur Fendi	Cycling	Men's B time trial	21 October
20	Bronze	Leani Ratri Oktila; Khalimatus Sadiyah	Badminton	Women's doubles SL3–SU5	21 October
21	Bronze	Ni Made Arianti Putri	Athletics	Women's 100 m T12	21 October
22	Bronze	Nanda Mei Sholihah	Athletics	Women's 100 m T47	21 October
23	Bronze	Abdil Majid Rahman; Jendi Pangabean; Zahra Nur Azizah; Mutiara Cantik Harsanto	Swimming	Mixed 4x100 m medley 34 points	21 October
24	Bronze	Muh Al Imran	Badminton	Men's singles SL3	22 October
25	Bronze	Khalimatus Sadiyah	Badminton	Women's singles SL4	22 October
26	Bronze	Qonitah Ikhtiar Syakuroh	Badminton	Women's singles SL3	22 October
27	Bronze	Rina Marlina	Badminton	Women's singles SH6	22 October
28	Bronze	Yayang Gunaya; Osrita Muslim	Table tennis	Mixed doubles Class XD7	22 October
29	Bronze	Helin Wardina	Athletics	Women's 100 m T37	22 October
30	Bronze	Vitasari	Athletics	Women's 200 m T36	22 October
31	Bronze	Elsa Dwi Saputri	Powerlifting	Women's +86 kg	22 October
32	Bronze	Yayang Gunaya; Adyos Astan	Table tennis	Men's doubles Class MD8	23 October
33	Bronze	Leli Marlina; Osrita Muslim	Table tennis	Women's doubles Class WD10	23 October
34	Bronze	Nur Fendi	Cycling	Men's B road race	23 October
35	Bronze	Kholidin; Setiawan	Para Archery	Men's doubles recurve	23 October
36	Bronze	Subhan; Dimas Tri Aji	Badminton	Men's doubles SH6	23 October
37	Bronze	Rica Oktavia	Athletics	Women's long jump T20	23 October

== Archery ==
Individual

Archer	Event	Ranking Round		Round of 32	Round of 16	Quarterfinals	Semi-finals	Final / BM	
Archer	Event	Score	Seed	Opposition Score	Opposition Score	Opposition Score	Opposition Score	Opposition Score	Rank
Arif Firmansyah	Men's compound	15	619	Ngai (HKG); W 142–136	Kumar (IND); L 142–144	Did not Advance			
Ken Swagumilang	Men's compound	4	638	bye	Singpirom (THA); W 148–141	Barani (IRI); L 144–149	Did not Advance		
Teodora Audi Ayudia Ferelly	Women's compound	4	622	bye	Srathongmaew (THA); W 145–138	Xu (CHN); L 148–139	Did not Advance		
Kholidin	Men's recurve	2	640	bye	Kishen (KAZ); W 6–0	Tseng (TPE); W 7–3	Zhao (CHN); L 2–6	Yun (CHN) –	
Setiawan	Men's recurve	11	614	Namjilmaa (MGL); W 6-2	Ueyama (JPN); L 1–7	Did not Advance			
Riyanti Ananda	Women's recurve	11	513	bye	Pattawaeo (THA); L 1–7	Did not Advance			
Noviera Ross	Women's recurve	3	613	bye	Miki (JPN); W 6–2	Pattawaeo (THA); W 7–1	Demberel (MGL); L 2–6	Wang (CHN) –	

Doubles

Archer	Event	Ranking Round		Round of 16	Quarterfinals	Semi-finals	Final / BM	
Archer	Event	Score	Seed	Opposition Score	Opposition Score	Opposition Score	Opposition Score	Rank
Arif Firmansyah; Ken Swagumilanng	Men's compound	3	1257	bye	Ateibekov / Medvedev (KAZ); W 154–148	Swami / Kumar (IND); W 156–155	Singpirom / Phiarthanee (THA); L 147–150	2nd place, silver medalist(s)
Ken Swagumilanng; Teodora Audi Ayudia Ferelly	Mixed compound	3	1313	bye	Thailand (THA) W 150–147	China (CHN) W 150–142	India (IND); L 151–148	2nd place, silver medalist(s)
Kholidin; Setiawan	Men's recurve	2	1254	bye	Netsiri / Phimthong (THA); W 5–1	Zhao / Yun (CHN); L 1–5	Kim Junghoon / Kwak Geonhwi (KOR); W 6–0	3rd place, bronze medalist(s)
Noviera Ross; Riyanti Ananda	Women's recurve	4	1130	bye	Buyanjargal / Demberel (MGL); L 2–6	Did not advance		12
Kholidin; Noviera Ross	Mixed recurve	2	1253	bye	Mongolia (MGL); W 5–4	Iran (IRI) W 5–1	China (CHN); L 1–5	2nd place, silver medalist(s)

== Athletics ==
Men

Athlete	Event	Class	Heat		Final	
Athlete	Event	Class	Result	Rank	Result	Rank
Taufik Abdul karim	100 m	T11	11.30 GR	1 Q	11.48	2nd place, silver medalist(s)
Muhammad Ridho Alfares Putra	100 m	F36	12.09	2 Q	11.87 PB	2nd place, silver medalist(s)
Partin	100 m	T63	—N/a		12.37 GR	1st place, gold medalist(s)
Saptoyogo Purnomo	100 m	T37	—N/a		11.35	2nd place, silver medalist(s)
Firza Listianto	100 m	F47	11.48	9	—N/a	
Jaenal Aripin	100 m	F54	14.58	4 q	14.49	7
Saptoyogo Purnomo	200m	T37	—N/a		23.45 PB	2nd place, silver medalist(s)
Taufik Abdul Karim	400m	T11	53.65	5 PB	—N/a	
Alfin Nomleni	400m	T20	49.80	1 Q	49.18	3rd place, bronze medalist(s)
Saptoyogo Purnomo	400m	T37	—N/a		56.22 SB	2nd place, silver medalist(s)
Figo Saputra	400m	T47	52.19 PB	4 q	52.75	7
Jaenal Aripin	400m	T54	—N/a		48.98	8
Alfin Nomleni	1500m	T20	—N/a		4:41.61	6
I Kadek Dwi Purwana Yasa	Discus Throw	F57	—N/a		49.75 WR	1st place, gold medalist(s)
Reza Angin	Discus Throw	F43/44,62/64	—N/a		40.40 PB	4
Ansyari	Javelin Throw	F40/41	—N/a		43.55 PB	2nd place, silver medalist(s)
Marcelino Michael	Javelin Throw	F12/13	—N/a			4
Fauzi Purwolaksono	Javelin Throw	F56/57	—N/a		42.70	6
Rizal Bagus Saktyono	Javelin Throw	F46	—N/a		55.31 PB	3rd place, bronze medalist(s)
Muhammad Putra	Long jump	T36	—N/a		53.65 PB	5
Marcelino Michael	Shot put	F12	—N/a		12.85	2nd place, silver medalist(s)
Sholahuddin Al Ayyubi	Shot put	F41	—N/a		9.99	5
Rizal Bagus Skatyono	Shot put	F46	—N/a		12.54	5

Women

Athlete	Event	Class	Heat		Final	
Athlete	Event	Class	Result	Rank	Result	Rank
Susan Unggu	100m	T11	14.78	3	—N/a	
Ni Made Arianti Putri	100m	T12	12.36 PB	2 q	12.51	3rd place, bronze medalist(s)
Vitasari	100m	T36	—N/a		14.75 PB	3rd place, bronze medalist(s)
Helin Wardina	100m	T37/38	—N/a		13.69 PB	3rd place, bronze medalist(s)
Nanda Mei Sholihah	100m	T47	12.68	2 Q	12.53	3rd place, bronze medalist(s)
Karisma Evi Tiarani	100m	T63	—N/a		14.59 WR	1st place, gold medalist(s)
Susan Unggu	200m	T11	32.20	8	—N/a	
Ni Made Arianti Putri	200m	T12	26.88 PB	6	—N/a	
Vitasari	200m	T36	—N/a		31.32 PB	3rd place, bronze medalist(s)
Helin Wardina	200m	T37	—N/a		28.58 PB	3rd place, bronze medalist(s)
Nanda Mei Sholihah	200m	T47	26.17	3 Q	25.93	3rd place, bronze medalist(s)
Maria Yati	5000m	T54	—N/a		13:12.93	5
Maria Yati	1500m	T54	—N/a		4:02.04	7
Lia Priyanti	Discus throw	F43/44/62/64	—N/a		30.41 PB	2nd place, silver medalist(s)
Rica Oktavia	Long Jump	T20	—N/a		5.08	3rd place, bronze medalist(s)
Helin Wardina	Long Jump	T37/38	—N/a		3.93	4
Karisma Evi Tiarani	Long Jump	T42/44/61/61/63/64	—N/a		3.91	3rd place, bronze medalist(s)
Yati Suparni	Shot put	F20	—N/a		11.13	4
Lia Priyanti	Shot put	F42-44/62/64	—N/a		10.17 PB	4

Mixed

Athlete	Event	Final	
Athlete	Event	Result	Rank
Ni Made Arianti Putri; Nanda Mei Sholihah; Saptoyogo Purnomo; Jaenal Aripin	4x100m universal relay	47.52	3rd place, bronze medalist(s)

== Badminton ==
=== Men ===
Athlete	Event	Preliminary round				Round 16	Quarterfinal	Semifinal	Final	
Athlete	Event	Opposition Score	Opposition Score	Opposition Score	Rank	Opposition Score	Opposition Score	Opposition Score	Opposition Score	Rank
Wiwin Andri	Singles WH2	Alameer (IRQ); W 21–15, 21–5	Mythili (IND); L 13-21, 17-21	—N/a	2 Q	Noorlan (MAS); W 21–14, 21–12	Wu (CHN); L 11–21, 10–21	Did not advance		
Supriadi	Singles WH2	zhao (CHN); L 12–21, 10–21	Kajiwara (JPN); L 13-21, 17-21	—N/a	3	Did not advance				
Muh Al Imran	Singles SL3	Bunsun (THA); W 21–14, 21–17	Fujihara (JPN); W 21-18, 21-15	—N/a	1 Q	Bye	Chamnanwet (THA); W 21–4, 21–14	Kumar (IND); L 19–21, 16–21	Did not advance	3rd place, bronze medalist(s)
Suryo Nugroho	Singles SU5	Saidov (TJK); W 21–8, 21–8	Imai (JPN); L 16-21, 11-21	—N/a	2 Q	Makkar (IND); L 18–21, 12–21	Did not advance			
Hikmat Ramdani	Singles SL4	Jeon (KOR); W 21–15, 21–17	Sivakumar (IND); L 12-21, 10-21	—N/a	2 Q	Shin (KOR); L 15–21, 21–18, 15–21	Did not advance			
Fredy Setiawan	Singles SL4	Dhar (BAN); W 21-15, 21-11	Laalinavaree (IND); L 8-21, 14-21	—N/a	2 Q	Imam (BAN); W 21–6, 21–16	Kadam (IND); W 21–17, 18–21, 21–15	Lalinakere (IND); W 23–21, 8–21, 21–17	Sivakumar (IND); L 9–21, 17–21	2nd place, silver medalist(s)
Agung Widodo	Singles WH1	Prem (IND); L 21–15, 15–21, 16–21	Ramli (MAS); L 14-21, 18-21	Younas (UAE); L 21-5, 18-21, 17-21	3	Did not advance				
Muh Al Imran / Suryo Nugroho	Double SL3-SU5	Shi / Cho (KOR); W 21-10, 21-11	Bagat / Kadam (IND); W 21-18, 21-18	—N/a	1 Q	Bye	Chen / Yi (CHN); W 21-14, 21-10	Yadav / Sivakumar (IND); W 21–8, 21–16	Cho Nadan / Shin Kyung-Hwan (KOR); 25–23, 21–8	1st place, gold medalist(s)
Hikmat Ramdani / Fredy Setiawan	Double SL3-SU5	Kumar / Pandey (IND); W 21-14, 21-10	Chen / Yi (CHN); W 21-10, 21-10	—N/a	1 Q	Bye	Li / Xiong (CHN); L 19-21, 17-21	Did not advance		
Supriadi / Agung Widodo	Double WH1-WH2	Park / Yu (KOR); L –	Albedrawi / Younas (UAE); W 21-14, 21-16	Alamsani / Alameer (UAE); W 21-14, 19-21, 21-13	2 Q	—N/a	Nishimura / Kajiwara (JPN); L 6–21, 17–21	Did not advance		5
Dimas Tri Aji	Singles; SH6	Chu (HKG); L (8–21, 7–21)	Lee (KOR); L (16-21, 16-21)	Muthusamy (IND); L (20-22, 19-21)	4	Did not advance				
Subhan	Singles; SH6	Lin NL (CHN); L (5–21, 15–21)	Nagar (IND); L (7-21, 5-21)	Lin J-s (TPE); W (21-6, 21-7)	3	Did not advance				
Dimas Tri Aji; Subhan	Doubles SH6	Nagar / Solaimalai (IND); L 20-22, 18-21	Chu / Wong (HKG); W 21–17, 21–17	—N/a						3rd place, bronze medalist(s)

=== Women ===
Athlete	Event	Preliminary round				Quarterfinal	Semifinal	Final	
Athlete	Event	Opposition Score	Opposition Score	Opposition Score	Rank	Opposition Score	Opposition Score	Opposition Score	Rank
Rina Marlina	Single SH6	Saeyang (THA); W 21–10, 21–5	Wu (TPE); W 21-13, 21-16	—N/a	1 Q	—N/a	Li Fengmei (CHN); L 5–21, 5–21	Did not advance	3rd place, bronze medalist(s)
Apriliyani Sulistyawati	Single SH6	Shuangbao (CHN); L 0–2	Sumathy (IND); L 0–2	—N/a	3	Did not advance			
Leani Ratri Oktila	Single SL4	Jadaun (IND); W 21–2, 21–4	Nakamura (JPN); W 21-6, 21-5	Huang (CHN); W 21–19, 20–22, 21–5	1 Q	Bye	Sadiyah (INA); W 21–8, 21–6	Cheng (CHN); L 21–23, 21–13, 17–21	2nd place, silver medalist(s)
khalimatus Sadiyah	Single SL4	Srinavakul (THA); W 21–10, 21–15	Cheng (CHN); L 8-21, 13-21	Pedrosa (PHI); W 21–3, 21–6	2 Q	Bye	Leani (INA); L 8–21, 6–21	Did not advance	3rd place, bronze medalist(s)
Warining Rahayu	Single SU5	Yang (CHN); L 17-21, 5-21	Ramdass (IND); L 10-21, 15-21	Vishwanathan (IND); W 21–11, 21–17	Did not advance				
Qonitah Ikhtiar Syakuroh	Single SL3	Kumari (IND); W 21-13, 21-6	Zhang (CHN); W 21-2, 21-3	—N/a	1 Q	Bye	Xiao (CHN); L 21–9, 14–21, 9–21	Did not advance	3rd place, bronze medalist(s)
Rina Marlina / Apriliyani Sulistyawati	double SH6	Choi / Chu (HKG); W 21–15, 21–13	Li / Lin (CHN); L 6-21, 2-21	—N/a	2 Q	—N/a			2nd place, silver medalist(s)
Leani Ratri Oktila / khalimatus Sadiyah	Double SL3-SU5	Kaur / Viswanathan (IND); W 21–14, 21–9	Wang / Zhang (HKG); W 21-9, 21-11	Cheng / Huang (CHN); W 21–7, 21-10	1 Q	Bye	Yang / Xiao (CHN); L 19–21, 21–19, 17–21	Did not advance	3rd place, bronze medalist(s)
Warining Rahayu / Qonitah Ikhtiar Syakuroh	Double SL3-SU5	Yang / Xiao (CHN); L 12-21, 5-21	Liu / Li (CHN); W 21-19, 14-21, 23-21		3	Did not advance			10

=== Mixed ===
Athlete	Event	Preliminary round				Quarterfinal	Semifinal	Final	
Athlete	Event	Opposition Score	Opposition Score	Opposition Score	Rank	Opposition Score	Opposition Score	Opposition Score	Rank
Rina Marlina / Subhan	SH6	Meechai / Saeyang (THA); W 21–15, 18–21, 21–19	Choi / Chu (HKG); W 21–15, 21–13	Lin / Zheng (CHN); W 21–10, 21–18	1 Q	Bye	Nagar / Sumathy (IND); W 21–14, 21–18	Lin / Peng (CHN); W 21–16, 11–21, 21–15	1st place, gold medalist(s)
Khalimatus Sadiyah / Fredy Setiawan	SL3-SU5	Ragupathi / Joshi (IND); W 21–15, 21–4	Pedrosa / Urbano (PHI); W 21–9, 21–5	Li / Xiao (CHN); L 14-21, 21-12, 19-21	2 Q	Xiao / Li (CHN); L 14–21, 22–20, 15–21	Did not advance		5
Leani Ratri Oktila / Hikmat Ramdani	SL3-SU5	Ramdass / Bhagat (IND); W 21–19, 21–16	Xiong / Li (CHN); W 21-7, 21-11	—N/a	1 Q	Bye	Ramdass / Bhagat (IND); W 16–21, 21–13, 21–17	Murugesan / Kumar (IND); W 11–21, 21–19, 21–14	1st place, gold medalist(s)

== Boccia ==
=== Men's ===
Athlete	Event	Group Stage			Quarterfinal	Semifinals	Final / BM	
Athlete	Event	Opposition Score	Opposition Score	Rank	Opposition Score	Opposition Score	Opposition Score	Rank
Muhamad Afrizal Syafa	Individual BC1	Almat (KAZ); W 4–3	Chan (HKG); W 5–3	1 Q	Askarbekov (KAZ); W 9–3	Huadpradit (THA); L 2–5	Loung (HKG); L 5-6	4
Felix Ardi Yudha	Individual BC2	Khurelbaatar (MGL); W 17–0	Chee Hoong (MAS); W 3*–3	1 Q	Satria (INA); W 6–2	Yan (CHN); W 5–0	Linchum (THA); W 5–3	1st place, gold medalist(s)
Muhammad Bintang Satria Herlangga	Individual BC2	Khayriddinov (UZB); W 13–1	Linchum (THA); L 4–8	2 Q	Yudha (INA); L 2–6	Did not advance		5

=== Women ===
Team	Event	Group Stage					Quarterfinal	Semifinals	Final / BM	
Team	Event	Opposition Score	Opposition Score	Opposition Score	Opposition Score	Rank	Opposition Score	Opposition Score	Opposition Score	Rank
Handayani	Individual BC1	Tang (MAC); W 13–0	Tsai (TPE); W 8–1	Kim (KOR) W 10–2	Melissa (MAS); L 1–5	2 Q	Bye	Ghayebi (IRI); W 5–2	Melissa (MAS); W 5–4	1st place, gold medalist(s)
Gischa Zayana	Individual BC2	Sorn (CAM); W 7–2	Satybaldyeva (KGZ) W 20–0	Phromsiri (THA); W 7–1	—N/a	1 Q	Bye	Choi (KOR); W 8–1	Yeung (HKG); W 6–5	1st place, gold medalist(s)

=== Mixed ===
Team	Event	Group Stage				Semifinals	Final / BM	
Team	Event	Opposition Score	Opposition Score	Opposition Score	Rank	Opposition Score	Opposition Score	Rank
Muhamad Afrizal Syafa; Felix Ardi Yudha; Gischa Zayana	Team BC1–2	Hong Kong; W 14–5	Malaysia; W 11–1	Japan; W 21–1	1 Q	South Korea; W 11–2	Thailand; W 11–3	1st place, gold medalist(s)

== Cycling ==
Athlete	Event	Qualifying round		Final/BM	
Athlete	Event	Timing	Rank	Timing	Rank
Tifan Abid Alana	Men C1-2 3000m Individual	3:53.340	4 QB	3:53.552	4
Tifan Abid Alana	Men C1-3 10000m time trial	1:08.708	4 Q	DNF	8
Tifan Abid Alana	Men C1-5 time trial	—N/a			DNS
Tifan Abid Alana	Men C1-3 road race	—N/a		1:31.09	5
Fadli Immammuddin	Men C4 4000m individual	4:50.169	1 QG	4:50.169 GR	1st place, gold medalist(s)
Fadli Immammuddin	Men C4-5 1000m time trial	—N/a		1:16.725	13
Fadli Immammuddin	Men C1-5 time trial	—N/a		26:59.50	5
Fadli Immammuddin	Men C4-5 road race	—N/a			DNF
Nur Fendi	Men B 4000m Individual	1:17.564	11	—N/a	
Nur Fendi	Men B 1000m time trial	4:38.546	4 QB	4:46.683	4
Nur Fendi	Men B time trial	—N/a		40:00.00	3rd place, bronze medalist(s)
Nur Fendi	Men B road race	—N/a		–1LAP	3rd place, bronze medalist(s)
Sufyan Saori	Men C4–5 1000m time trial	1:08.373	3 Q	1:08.166	3rd place, bronze medalist(s)
Sufyan Saori	Men C5 4000m individual	—N/a		5:00.249	5
Sufyan Saori	Men C4-5 road race	—N/a		1:52.54	7
Vanza Miftahul Jannah	Women B 4000m Individual	5:05.035	3 QB	5:12.494	3rd place, bronze medalist(s)
Vanza Miftahul Jannah	Women B time trial	—N/a		35:08.11	4
Vanza Miftahul Jannah	Women B road race	—N/a		–1LAP	5

== Judo ==
Athlete	Event	Round of 16	Quarterfinal	Semifinal	Repechage	Final / BM	
Athlete	Event	Opposition Result	Opposition Result	Opposition Result	Opposition Result	Opposition Result	Rank
Junaedi	Men J1 –70 kg	—N/a	Akbarov (UZB) W 100-000	Parmar (IND) W 100-000	—N/a	Zhu (CHN) L 000-100	2nd place, silver medalist(s)
Rafli Ahnaf Shidqi	Men J1 –70 kg	Nashwan (YEM) W 011-010	Safarkulov (UZB) L 000-100	—N/a	Nurdauletov (KAZ) W 100-000	Parmar (IND) L 000-100	5
Fajar Pambudi	Men J1 –95 kg	—N/a	Amandaulet (KAZ) W 010-001	Abdiev (KAZ) L 000-101	—N/a	Dashtseren (MGL); W 100–000	3rd place, bronze medalist(s)
Novia Larassati	Women J1 –52 kg	—N/a	Togtokhbayar (MGL) L 000-002	—N/a		Babaeva (UZB) L 000-001	5
Dhenny Marsyelina	Women J1 –60 kg	—N/a	Phajen (THA) W 101-000	Shi (CHN) L 000-100	—N/a	Zhanatbek (KAZ) W 110-000	3rd place, bronze medalist(s)
Siyamsih	Women J1 –70 kg	Rikhsiboeva (UZB) W 100-012	Lkhaijav (MGL) L 000-100	—N/a	Tsuchiya (JPN); L 000-003	—N/a	7

Athlete	Event	Group Stage				
Athlete	Event	Oppositions Score	Opposition Score	Opposition Score	Opposition Score	Rank
Roma Siska Tampubolon	Women +70 kg J1	Abdykalykova (KAZ); W 100–000	Noh Wonhee (KOR); L 000–100	Ergasheva (UZB); L 010–110	Seilbekova (KAZ); L000–100	4

== Powerlifting ==
Athlete	Event	Attempt 1	Attempt 2	Attempt 3	Best total	Rank
M Mabruk Arif Dzaki	Men's up to 59 kg	156 kg	158 kg	~~161~~	158	9
A Hadi	Men's up to 49 kg	~~173~~	~~176~~	~~176~~	–	–
Hilman	Men's up to 54 kg	165 kg	~~170~~	~~170~~	165 kg	3rd place, bronze medalist(s)
Margono	Men's up to 65 kg	170 kg	~~175~~	177 kg	177 kg	3rd place, bronze medalist(s)
Eliana	women's up to 41 kg	80 kg	~~83~~	~~83~~	80 kg	6
Ni Nengah Widiasih	women's up to 41 kg	97 kg	~~99~~	~~102~~	97 kg	3rd place, bronze medalist(s)
Siti Mahmudah	Women up to 86 kg	~~135~~	~~135~~	~~135~~	–	–
Shebrioni	Women's up to 61 kg	155 kg	~~117~~	~~119~~	155 kg	3rd place, bronze medalist(s)
Sriyanti	Women's over to 86 kg	~~145~~	~~145~~	~~145~~	–	–
Elsa Dwi Saputri	Women's over to 86 kg	122 kg	127 kg	130 kg	130 kg	3rd place, bronze medalist(s)
Shebrioni; Siti Mahmudah; Sriyanti	Women Team	~~116~~	130	142	212.54	2nd place, silver medalist(s)
Ni Nengah Widiasih; Hilman; A Hadi	Mixed Team	95	165	170	377.8	2nd place, silver medalist(s)

== Swimming ==
Men

Athlete	Event	Heat		Final	
Athlete	Event	Result	Rank	Result	Rank
Abdil Majid Rahman	50m freestyle S8	—N/a		29.46	7
Abdil Majid Rahman	100 m breaststroke SB7	—N/a		1:21.26	1st place, gold medalist(s)
Zaki Zulkarnain	50 m freestyle S9	28.80	10	—N/a	
Zaki Zulkarnain	100 m breaststroke SB9	1:22.01	3	1:15.67	4
M Gerry Pahker	100 m breaststroke SB6	—N/a		1:35.09	5
Jendi Pangabean	100 m backstroke S9	—N/a		1:05.10	2nd place, silver medalist(s)
Jendi Pangabean	100 m butterfly S9	1:04.68	1	1:04.18	6
Bayu Putra Yuda	100 m breaststroke SB9	1:18.93	2	1:19.92	5
Bayu Putra Yuda	100 m butterfly S10	—N/a		1:06.94	5
Amsyar Juba Ubaidillah Ramadhani	100 m butterfly S10	—N/a		1:05.51	4
Amsyar Juba Ubaidillah Ramadhani	100 m freesyle S10	—N/a			DSQ
Maulana Rifky Yavianda	50 m freestyle S13	25.78	1	25.51	2nd place, silver medalist(s)
Maulana Rifky Yavianda	100 m freestyle S12	—N/a		55.34	1st place, gold medalist(s)
Maulana Rifky Yavianda	100 m butterfly S12	—N/a		1:01.95	2nd place, silver medalist(s)
Maulana Rifky Yavianda	100 m backstroke S12	—N/a		1:03.07 AR	1st place, gold medalist(s)

Women

Athlete	Event	Heat		Final	
Athlete	Event	Result	Rank	Result	Rank
Siti Alfiah	100 m breaststroke SB6	—N/a		1:52.48	4
Zahra Nur Azizah	100 m backstroke S9	—N/a		1:24.18	7
Zahra Nur Azizah	400 m freestyle S9	—N/a		5:55.55	5
Mutriara Cantik Harsanto	100 m breaststroke SB9	32.05	3	31.06	4
Mutriara Cantik Harsanto	50 m freestyle SB9	1:29.24	1	1:27.62	2nd place, silver medalist(s)
Syuci Indriani	100 m breaststroke SB14	—N/a		1:23.26	5
Syuci Indriani	100 m butterfly S14	1:11.11	2	1:11.77	6
Theradina Audria Lie	100 m freestyle S10	—N/a		1:09.69	3rd place, bronze medalist(s)
Theradina Audria Lie	50 m freestyle SB9	—N/a		31.77	4

Mixed

Team	Event	Heat		Final	
Team	Event	Result	Rank	Result	Rank
Abdil Majid Rahman; Jendi Pangabean; Zahra Nur Azizah; Mutiara Cantik Harsanto	4x100m Medley 34 Points	—N/a		4:59.08	3rd place, bronze medalist(s)
Zaki Zulkarnain; Jendi Pangabean; Siti Alfiah; Theradina Audria Lie	4x100m Freesyle 34 Points	—N/a		4:46.15	5

== Para Table Tennis ==
=== Single ===
Team	Event	Group Stage				Round 16	Quarterfinal	Semifinals	Final / BM	
Team	Event	Opposition Score	Opposition Score	Opposition Score	Rank	Opposition Score	Opposition Score	Opposition Score	Opposition Score	Rank
Yayang Gunawan	Men's Class 4-5	Walimunige (NEP)	Saito (JPN)							
Barce Labaya	Men's Class 4-5	Ip (MAC)	Cheng (TPE)							3rd place, bronze medalist(s)
Adyos Astan	Men's Class 4-6	Chamjong (NEP); W 3–0	Yoy (CAM)							
Banyu Tri Mulya	Men's Class 8	Redulla (PHI)	Phisit (THA)							
Kusnanto	Men's Class 9	Chee (MAS)	Wong (HKG)							
Komet Akbar	Men's Class 10	Lin (TPE)	Nariaki Kakita (JPN)							3rd place, bronze medalist(s)
Muhamad Dwiputra	Men's Class 11	Chen (TPE)	Ahmad (MAS)							
Osrita Muslim	Women Single 3	Batuhan (PHI)	Huang (CHN)	Asayut (THA)						
Leli Marlina	Women Class 4-5	Sorn (CAM); W 3–0	Zhang (CHN)	Tamang (NEP)						
Hamida	Women Class 8	Chaiwut (THA)	Tash (KAZ)	Tomono (JPN)						3rd place, bronze medalist(s)
Sella Dwi Radayana	Women Class 10	Tian (TPE); L 0–3	Lam (HKG)							

=== Double ===
Athlete	Event	Group Stage					Quarterfinal	Semifinals	Final / BM	
Athlete	Event	Opposition Score	Opposition Score	Opposition Score	Opposition Score	Rank	Opposition Score	Opposition Score	Opposition Score	Rank
Adyos Astan / Yayang Gunawan	Class MD8	Peng / Feng (CHN); W 3–2	Ben jabal / Alotaibi (KUW); W 3–0	—N/a		1 Q	—N/a	Kitagawa / Shinchino (JPN); L 0–3	—N/a	3rd place, bronze medalist(s)
Leli Marlina / Osrita Muslim	Class WD10	Bian zhang / Miao Zhang (CHN); L 0–3	Jaioan / Sringam (THA); L 0–3	Lee / Jung (KOR); L 0–3	Alkhalaf / Alrasheedi (KUW); W 3–0	3	—N/a			3rd place, bronze medalist(s)
Hamida / Sella Dwi Radayana	Class WD20	Hou / Xiong (CHN); L 0–3	Lee Kunwoo / Kim Kunhae (KOR); W 3–2	—N/a		2 Q	Miura / Tomono (JPN); L 0–3	Did ot advance		5

=== Mixed ===
Athlete	Event	Group Stage					Quarterfinal	Semifinals	Final / BM	
Athlete	Event	Opposition Score	Opposition Score	Opposition Score	Opposition Score	Rank	Opposition Score	Opposition Score	Opposition Score	Rank
Yayang Gunaya / Osrita Muslim	Class XD7	Alkhalaf / Alotaibi (KUW); W 3–0	Wadhwa / Patel (IND); L 0–3	Batuhan / Cartera (PHI); W 3–2	—N/a	2 Q	Saito / Ikeyama (JPN); W 3–0	Glinbancheun / Jaion (THA); L 0–3	—N/a	3rd place, bronze medalist(s)
Barce Labaya / Leli Marlina	Class XD10	Yoy / Sorn (CAM); W 3–0	Lin / Cheng (TPE); W 3–0	Sringam / Chanphaka (THA); W 3–0	—N/a	1 Q	Chaiwut / Sringam (THA); W 3–1	Zhang / Peng (CHN); W 3–2	Kim / Moon (KOR); W 3–1	1st place, gold medalist(s)
Hamida / Kusnanto	Class XD17	Iwabuchi / Tomono (JPN); L 0–3	Tash / Makhulbekov (KAZ); W 3–0	—N/a		2 Q	Park Hongkyu / Kim Kunhae (KOR); L 0–3	Did not avnce		5
Komet Akbar / Sella Dwi Radayana	Class XD20	Surtubayev / Yerzhankuzy (KAZ); L 1–3	Lian / Hou (CHN); L 1–3	Kakita / Miura (JPN); L 2–3	—N/a	3 q	Did not advance			

== See also ==
- Indonesia at the 2026 Asian Games
