= Tajikistan at the 2026 Asian Para Games =

- Flag of Tajikistan
- IPC code: TJK
- NPC: Tajik Paralympic Committee

in Aichi and Nagoya, Japan 18–24 October 2026
- Competitors: 10 (9 men and 1 woman) in 6 sports
- Medals Ranked 28th: Gold 0 Silver 1 Bronze 0 Total 1

Asian Para Games appearances
- 2010; 2014; 2018; 2022; 2026

Tajikistan participated in the 2026 Asian Para Games held in Nagoya, Aichi Prefecture, Japan, from 18 to 24 October 2026. The country sent 10 athletes, nine men and one woman to participate across nine sports.

Shohrukh Marufovich Nazarov won lone silver medal for Tajikistan in Judo. It is the first ever medal by Tajikistan in Asian Para Games.

== Medalists ==
Medal	Athlete	Sport	Event	Date
(silver) Silver	Shohrukh Marufovich Nazarov	Judo	Men's J1 -81 kg	20 October

=== Summary ===
Medals by events
Sport	Gold	Silver	Bronze	Total
Judo	0	1	0	1
Total	0	1	0	1

Medals by day
Day	Date	Gold	Silver	Bronze	Total
1	19 October	0	0	0	0
2	20 October	0	1	0	1
3	21 October	0	0	0	0
4	22 October	0	0	0	0
5	23 October	0	0	0	0
6	24 October	0	0	0	0
Total		0	1	0	1

Medals by gender
Gender	Gold	Silver	Bronze	Total
Female	0	0	0	0
Male	0	1	0	1
Mixed	0	0	0	0
Total	0	1	0	1

== Competitors ==
The following is a list of the number of competitors who represented Tajikistan that will participate at the Asian Para Games:

Sport	Men	Women	Total
Athletics	3	-	3
Badminton	1	-	1
Cycling	1	-	1
Judo	3	-	3
Powerlifting	1	-	1
Table tennis	-	1	1
Total	9	1	10

== Athletics ==
Track events

Athlete	Event	Class	Heat		Final	
Athlete	Event	Class	Result	Rank	Result	Rank
Firdavs Buriev	Men's 100 m	T47	12.18	13	Did not advance	

Field events

Athlete	Event	Class	Qualification		Final	
Athlete	Event	Class	Result	Rank	Result	Rank
Ramazon Mirzoev	Men's Long Jump	T12	-		4.78	5
Akmal Azizovich Qodirov	Men's Shot Put	F42/F61/F63	-		8.73	6

== Badminton ==
Athlete	Event	Group stage				Round of 16	Quarterfinals	Semifinals	Final	
Athlete	Event	Opposition Score	Opposition Score	Opposition Score	Rank	Opposition Score	Opposition Score	Opposition Score	Opposition Score	Rank
Zubair Saidov	Men's singles SU5	Nugroho (INA) L 0–2 (8-21, 8-21)	Imai (JPN) L 0–2 (1-21, 2-21)	Did not advance						

== Cycling ==
Athlete	Event	Qualifying round		Final	
Athlete	Event	Timing	Rank	Timing	Rank
Siyovush Ilyasov	Men's B 1000m Time Trial	Did not start		-	
Siyovush Ilyasov	Men's B 4000m Individual Pursuit	Did not start		-	
Siyovush Ilyasov	Men's B Road Race	-		-2LAP	10
Siyovush Ilyasov	Men's B Time Trial	-		DNF	

== Judo ==
Athlete	Event	Round of 16	Quarterfinal	Semifinal	Repechage	Final / BM	
Athlete	Event	Opposition Result	Opposition Result	Opposition Result	Opposition Result	Opposition Result	Rank
Murodjon Otajonovich Oripov	J1 -81 kg	Kato (JPN) L 000–100^{IPP}	Did not advance				
Shohrukh Marufovich Nazarov	J1 -81 kg	Zhou (CHN) W 103–000^{IPP}	Shamey (KAZ) W 010–001^{W-ARI}	Arstanbekov (KAZ) W 100–011^{IPP}	-	Mamedov (UZB) L 000–002^{YUK}	2nd place, silver medalist(s)
Rajab Huseinov	J1 -95 kg	-	Abdiev (UZB) L 000–001^{YUK}	-	Amandaulet (KAZ) W 100–000^{IPP}	Gholamishafia (IRI) L 000–100^{IPP}	5

== Powerlifting ==
Athlete	Event	Attempt 1	Attempt 2	Attempt 3	Final Score	Rank
Fathidin Ahmadi	Men's Up to 65kg	140	146	~~150~~	146	7

== Table Tennis ==
Athlete	Event	Group stage				Quarterfinal	Semifinal	Repechage	Final / BM	
Athlete	Event	Opposition Score	Opposition Score	Opposition Score	Rank	Opposition Result	Opposition Result	Opposition Result	Opposition Result	Rank
Nadima Nurbekova	Women's Singles - Class 9	Kim (KOR) L 1–3	Manginsay (PHI) L 0–3	Mao (CHN) L 1–3	-	-				
