= Cambodia at the 2026 Asian Para Games =

- IPC code: CAM
- NPC: National Paralympic Committee of Cambodia

in Aichi–Nagoya, Japan 18–24 October 2026
- Competitors: 17 (4 men and 13 women) in 5 sports
- Medals Ranked 29th: Gold 0 Silver 0 Bronze 1 Total 1

Asian Para Games appearances
- 2010; 2014; 2018; 2022; 2026

Cambodia is competing at the 2026 Asian Para Games in the Aichi Prefecture and Nagoya, Japan from 18 to 24 October 2026. The delegation consisted of 17 athletes in five sports.

Athelte, Vun Van won Cambodia's first ever Asian Para medal since the country's participation at the Asian Para Games.

== Medalists ==
Medal	Athlete	Sport	Event	Date
(bronze) Bronze	Vun Van	Athletics	Men's 100 m T54	20 October

=== Summary ===
Medals by events
Sport	Gold	Silver	Bronze	Total
Athletics	0	0	1	1
Total	0	0	1	1

Medals by day
Day	Date	Gold	Silver	Bronze	Total
1	19 October	0	0	0	0
2	20 October	0	0	1	1
3	21 October	0	0	0	0
4	22 October	0	0	0	0
Total		0	0	1	1

Medals by gender
Gender	Gold	Silver	Bronze	Total
Male	0	0	1	1
Female	0	0	0	0
Mixed	0	0	0	0
Total	0	0	1	1

Multiple medalists
Athlete	Event	1st place, gold medalist(s)	2nd place, silver medalist(s)	3rd place, bronze medalist(s)	Total

== Competitors ==
The following is the list of number of competitors participating in the Games:

Sport	Men	Women	Total
Athletics	2	1	3
Boccia	-	1	1
Swimming	1	-	1
Table tennis	1	1	2
Wheelchair basketball	0	10	10
Total	4	13	17

== Athletics ==
Track events
Men

Athlete	Event	Class	Heat		Final	
Athlete	Event	Class	Result	Rank	Result	Rank
Chaiya Sok	100 m	T47	12.14	13	Did not advance	
Vun Van	100 m	T54	14.31	1Q	14.10	3rd place, bronze medalist(s)

Women

Athlete	Event	Class	Heat		Final	
Athlete	Event	Class	Result	Rank	Result	Rank
Chantha Vet	100 m	T64	—N/a		15.30	4

Field events
Men

Athlete	Event	Class	Qualification		Final	
Athlete	Event	Class	Result	Rank	Result	Rank
Chaiya Sok	Long jump	T47	—N/a		5.45	8

Women

Athlete	Event	Class	Qualification		Final	
Athlete	Event	Class	Result	Rank	Result	Rank
Chantha Vet	Long jump	T42/T44/T61/T62/T63/T64	—N/a		4.03	5

== Boccia ==
Athlete	Event	Group stage					Semifinals	Final	
Athlete	Event	Opposition Score	Opposition Score	Opposition Score	Opposition Score	Rank	Opposition Score	Opposition Score	Rank
Sas Sorn	Women's individual BC2	Gischa Zayana (INA) L 2-7	Satanan Phromsiri (THA) L 3-8	Zhazira Satybaldyeva (KGZ) W 14-2	Did not advance				7

== Swimming ==
Men

Athlete	Event	Heat		Final	
Athlete	Event	Result	Rank	Result	Rank
Vannak Yav	100 m freestyle S10	—N/a		DNS	
Vannak Yav	100 m breaststroke SB9	1:33.58	5	Did not advance	
Vannak Yav	50 m freestyle S10	22 Oct			

== Table Tennis ==
Singles

Player	Event	Group stage					Quarter-final	Semi-final	Final	
Player	Event	Opposition Score	Opposition Score	Opposition Score	Opposition Score	Rank	Opposition Score	Opposition Score	Opposition Score	Rank
Kosal Yoy	Men's C4/5	Chaiwut (THA) L 1-3 _{(8-11, 8-11, 11-9, 7-11)}	Chemjong (NEP) W 3-1 _{(11-13, 11-3, 11-4, 11-5)}	Astan (INA) L 1-3 _{(6-11, 11-9, 5-11, 5-11)}	Did not advance					
Saroung Sorn	Women's C4/5	Marlina (INA) L 0-3 _{(4-11, 4-11, 5-11)}	Tamang (NEP) W 3-0 _{(11-4, 11-6, 11-3)}	Miao (CHN) L 0-3 _{(1-11, 3-11, 3-11)}	Did not advance					

Doubles

Pair	Event	Group stage					Quarter-final	Semi-final	Final	
Pair	Event	Opposition Score	Opposition Score	Opposition Score	Opposition Score	Rank	Opposition Score	Opposition Score	Opposition Score	Rank
Kosal Yoy Saroung Sorn	Mixed C10	Layaba / Marlina (INA) L 0-3	Sringam / Chanphaka (THA) L 0-3	Lin / Cheng (TPE) L 0-3	Did not advance					

== Wheelchair basketball ==
Summary

Team	Event	Group Stage						Final / BM / CS5	
Team	Event	Opposition Score	Opposition Score	Opposition Score	Opposition Score	Opposition Score	Rank	Opposition Score	Rank
Cambodia women's	Women's tournament	China L 28-70	Laos W 55-28	Iran L 39-52	Japan L 22-73	Thailand L 36-55		Laos W 54-26	5

== See also ==
- Cambodia at the 2026 Asian Games
