= Yemen at the 2026 Asian Para Games =

- Flag of Yemen
- IPC code: YEM
- NPC: Yemen Paralympic Committee
- Website: www.paralympic.org/npc/yemen

in Aichi-Nagoya, Japan 18 October 2026 – 24 October 2026
- Competitors: 2 (2 men and 0 women) in 2 sports
- Medals: Gold 0 Silver 0 Bronze 0 Total 0

Asian Para Games appearances
- 2018; 2022; 2026

Yemen participated in the 2026 Asian Para Games, in Nagoya, Aichi Prefecture, Japan, from 18 to 24 October 2026. This is Yemen's third appearance at the Games after Indonesia 2018 and Hangzhou 2022 editions.

== Medalists ==
Medal	Athlete	Sport	Event	Date

=== Summary ===
Medals by events
Sport	Gold	Silver	Bronze	Total
Total	0	0	0	0

Medals by day
Day	Date	Gold	Silver	Bronze	Total
1	19 October	0	0	0	0
2	20 October	0	0	0	0
3	21 October	0	0	0	0
4	22 October	0	0	0	0
5	23 October	0	0	0	0
6	24 October	0	0	0	0
Total		0	0	0	0

Medals by gender
Gender	Gold	Silver	Bronze	Total
Female	0	0	0	0
Male	0	0	0	0
Mixed	0	0	0	0
Total	0	0	0	0

Multiple medalists
Athlete	Event	1st place, gold medalist(s)	2nd place, silver medalist(s)	3rd place, bronze medalist(s)	Total

== Competitors ==
Following is the list of sports and number of athletes that represented Yemen:

Details of athletes
Sport	Men	Women	Total
Athletics	1	-	1
Judo	1	-	1
Total	2	-	2

== Athletics ==
Mohammed Farag, aged 17 years, represented Yemen in Men's 100m and 400m events.

Track events

Athlete	Event	Class	Heat		Final	
Athlete	Event	Class	Result	Rank	Result	Rank
Mohammed Farag	Men's 100 m	T53	18.55	10	Did not advance	
Mohammed Farag	Men's 400 m	T53	DQ		Did not advance	

== Judo ==
One Judoka, Shugaa Sami Ali Nashwan, represented Yemen in this edition of the Games. His campaign came to an end in the Round of 16 after losing to Rafli Ahnaf Shidqi of Indonesia by Yuko in 5:47.

Men

Athlete	Event	Round of 16	Quarterfinal	Semifinal	Repechage	Final / BM	
Athlete	Event	Opposition Result	Opposition Result	Opposition Result	Opposition Result	Opposition Result	Rank
Shugaa Sami Ali Nashwan	J2 -70 kg	Shidqi (INA); L 010–011^{YUK}	Did not advance				
