= Jordan at the 2026 Asian Para Games =

- Jordan flag
- IPC code: JOR
- NPC: Jordan Paralympic Committee
- Website: jpc-jo.org

in Aichi-Nagoya, Japan 18 October 2026 – 24 October 2026
- Competitors: 13 (10 men and 3 women) in 3 sports
- Flag bearer (opening): Abdelkareem Khattab
- Flag bearer (closing): TBD
- Medals Ranked 16th: Gold 2 Silver 1 Bronze 2 Total 5

Asian Para Games appearances
- 2010; 2014; 2018; 2022; 2026

Jordan is participating in the 2026 Asian Para Games, in Nagoya, Aichi Prefecture, Japan, from 18 to 24 October 2026. This will be Jordan's fifth appearance at the Games. Abdelkareem Khattab carried the Jordanian flag during the parade of participating delegations.

Jordan's Omar Qarada won first gold of Asian Para Games 2026 in Para Powerlifting.

== Medalists ==
Medal	Athlete	Sport	Event	Date
(gold) Gold	Omar Qarada	Powerlifting	Men's up to 49 kg	19 October
(gold) Gold	Abdelkareem Khattab	Powerlifting	Men's up to 97 kg	21 October
(silver) Silver	Nabeel Maqableh	Athletics	Men's 1500 m T12 /T13	21 October
(bronze) Bronze	Asma Issa	Powerlifting	Women's up to 79 kg	22 October
(bronze) Bronze	Tharwh Alhajaj	Powerlifting	Women's up to 86 kg	22 October

=== Summary ===
Medals by events
Sport	Gold	Silver	Bronze	Total
Powerlifting	2	0	2	4
Athletics	0	1	0	1
Total	2	1	2	5

Medals by day
Day	Date	Gold	Silver	Bronze	Total
1	19 October	1	0	0	1
2	20 October	0	0	0	0
3	21 October	1	1	0	2
4	22 October	0	0	2	2
Total		2	1	2	5

Medals by gender
Gender	Gold	Silver	Bronze	Total
Female	0	0	2	2
Male	2	1	0	3
Mixed	0	0	0	0
Total	2	1	2	5

Multiple medalists
Athlete	Event	1st place, gold medalist(s)	2nd place, silver medalist(s)	3rd place, bronze medalist(s)	Total

== Competitors ==
Following is the list of sports and number of athletes that will participate in the upcoming edition:

Sport	Men	Women	Total
Athletics	4	-	4
Powerlifting	5	2	7
Table tennis	1	1	2
Total	10	3	13

== Athletics ==
Track events
Men

Athlete	Event	Class	Heat		Final	
Athlete	Event	Class	Result	Rank	Result	Rank
Mohammadalmahdih Mosleh	1500 m	T11	4:51.57	3Q	22 Oct	
Nabeel Maqableh	1500 m	T12/13	—N/a		4:07.97	2nd place, silver medalist(s)
Mohammadalmahdih Mosleh	5000 m	T11	—N/a		18:11.38	4
Nabeel Maqableh	5000 m	T12/13	—N/a		23 Oct	

Field events
Men

Athlete	Event	Class	Qualification		Final	
Athlete	Event	Class	Result	Rank	Result	Rank
Anas Ananzeh	Shot Put	F32	—N/a		7.03	7
Obay Assad	Shot Put	F54/F55	—N/a		10.32	4
Obay Assad	Javelin Throw	F55	—N/a		21.54	7

== Powerlifting ==
Omar Qarada claimed the first gold medal of the 2026 Asian Para Games. It was Qarada's third Asian Para Games gold medal following his victories at Guangzhou 2010 and Hangzhou 2022.

Men

Athlete	Event	Attempt 1	Attempt 2	Attempt 3	Total	Rank
Omar Qarada	49 kg	174	176	~~178~~	176	1st place, gold medalist(s)
Mohammad Radaeda	54 kg	~~182~~	~~182~~	~~195~~	-	
Mohammad Tarbash	59 kg	165	170	~~182~~	170	6
Abdelkareem Khattab	97 kg	230	241	~~250~~	241	1st place, gold medalist(s)
Jamil El Shelbi	107 kg	—N/a			DSQ	

Women

Athlete	Event	Attempt 1	Attempt 2	Attempt 3	Total	Rank
Asma Issa	79 kg	122	129	~~134~~	129	3rd place, bronze medalist(s)
Tharwh Alhajaj	86 kg	124	~~129~~	129	129	3rd place, bronze medalist(s)

== Table Tennis ==
Singles

Player	Event	Group stage					Round of 16	Quarter-finals	Semi-finals	Final	
Player	Event	Opposition Score	Opposition Score	Opposition Score	Opposition Score	Rank	Opposition Score	Opposition Score	Opposition Score	Opposition Score	Rank
Ibrahim Sabra	Men's C4-5	Shichino (JPN) L 0–3	Park (KOR) L 0–3	Did not advance							
Faten Eleimat	Women's C4/5	Patel (IND) L 0–3	Al-Rasheedi (KUW) W 3–0	—N/a			Miyazaki (JPN) W 3–2	Jaion (THA) L 1–3	Did not advance		5

Doubles

Pair	Event	Group stage					Quarter-final	Semi-final	Final	
Pair	Event	Opposition Score	Opposition Score	Opposition Score	Opposition Score	Rank	Opposition Score	Opposition Score	Opposition Score	Rank
Faten Eleimat Ibrahim Sabra	Mixed C10	Park / Jung (KOR) Oct 21	Wanchai / Sringam (THA) Oct 21							
