= Bangladesh at the 2026 Asian Para Games =

- Bangladeshi Flag
- IPC code: BAN
- NPC: National Paralympic Committee of Bangladesh
- Website: https://www.npcbangladesh.org/

in Aichi-Nagoya, Japan 18 October 2026 – 24 October 2026
- Competitors: 11 (9 men and 2 women) in 5 sports
- Medals: Gold 0 Silver 0 Bronze 0 Total 0

Asian Para Games appearances (overview)
- 2010; 2014; 2018; 2022; 2026

Bangladesh participated in the 2026 Asian Para Games, in Nagoya, Aichi Prefecture, Japan, from 18 to 24 October 2026. This is Bangladesh's fifth appearance at the Games.

Bangladesh sent a contingent of 11 athletes, nine men and two women, for five sports. Bangladesh failed to secure any medal in this edition of the Games.

Bangladesh's youngest women athlete, Chaity Rani Deb, was only 14 years of age when she represented the country in Para Athletics. Bangladesh's youngest men athlete, Soumik Mondal, was only 18 years of age when he represented the country in Para Table Tennis.

== Medalists ==
Medal	Athlete	Sport	Event	Date

=== Summary ===
Medals by events
Sport	Gold	Silver	Bronze	Total
Total	0	0	0	0

Medals by day
Day	Date	Gold	Silver	Bronze	Total
1	19 October	0	0	0	0
2	20 October	0	0	0	0
0	21 October	0	0	0	0
4	22 October	0	0	0	0
5	23 October	0	0	0	0
6	24 October	0	0	0	0
Total		0	0	0	0

Medals by gender
Gender	Gold	Silver	Bronze	Total
Female	0	0	0	0
Male	0	0	0	0
Mixed	0	0	0	0
Total	0	0	0	0

Multiple medalists
Athlete	Event	1st place, gold medalist(s)	2nd place, silver medalist(s)	3rd place, bronze medalist(s)	Total

== Competitors ==
Following is the list of sports and number of athletes that represented Bangladesh in this edition of the Games. Bangladesh sent a contingent of 11 athletes comprising of 9 men and 2 women across 5 sports, namely, Para Archery, Para Athletics, Para Badminton, Para Swimming, and Para Table Tennis. Bangladesh failed to secure any medal in this edition of the Games.

Sport	Men	Women	Total
Archery	1	1	2
Athletics	3	1	4
Badminton	2	-	2
Swimming	1	-	1
Table tennis	2	-	2
Total	9	2	11

== Archery ==
Two archers competed from Bangladesh. Both the archers (one in recurve and other in compound) ended their campaign in the elimination round (1/8).

Individual

Archer	Event	Ranking Round		Round of 16	Quarterfinals	Semi-finals	Final / BM	
Archer	Event	Score	Seed	Opposition Score	Opposition Score	Opposition Score	Opposition Score	Rank
Al Amin Hossain	Men's recurve	618	9	Hanreuchai Netsiri (THA) L 2–6	Did not advance			13
Joma Akter	Women's compound	676	4	Shinohara (JPN) L 133–136	Did not advance			16

== Athletics ==
Four athletes (3 men and 1 women) represented Bangladesh. Among them, Md Selim Reza missed clinching bronze medal in Men's Long Jump T64 category and finished fourth.

Track events
Men

Athlete	Event	Class	Qualification		Final	
Athlete	Event	Class	Result	Rank	Result	Rank
Md Imtiaj Ahammed	100m	T47	-		DSQ WPA Rule 17.8	
Md Parves Miah	100m	T47	12.65	6	Did not advance	
Md Selim Reza	100m	T44	-			
Md Selim Reza	400m	T64			DNS	

Field events
Men

Athlete	Event	Class	Qualification		Final	
Athlete	Event	Class	Result	Rank	Result	Rank
Md Imtiaj Ahammed	Long Jump	T47	-		5.04	9
Md Parves Miah	Long Jump	F40	-		5.82	7
Md Selim Reza	High Jump	T64	-		1.83 PB	4

Women

Chaity Rani Deb, was only 14 years of age when she represented Bangladesh in this edition of the Games.

Athlete	Event	Class	Qualification		Final	
Athlete	Event	Class	Result	Rank	Result	Rank
Chaity Rani Deb	Discus Throw	F40	-		11.65	6
Chaity Rani Deb	Shot Put	F40	-		4.20	6

== Badminton ==
Bangladesh sent two athletes to compete in the men's games. Jyotu Dhar ended his campaign in the group stage while Mohammad Ali Imam reached up to the round of 16 in Men's Singles SL4 category and finished 9th overall. In doubles event, the shuttlers failed to reach the knockouts.

Athlete	Event	Group stage				Round of 16	Quarterfinals	Semifinals	Final	
Athlete	Event	Opposition Score	Opposition Score	Opposition Score	Rank	Opposition Score	Opposition Score	Opposition Score	Opposition Score	Rank
Jyotu Dhar	Men's Singles SL4	Lalinakere (IND) L 0–2 (8-21, 11-21)	Setiawan (INA) L 0–2 (15-21, 11-21)	Did not advance						17
Mohammad Ali Imam	Men's Singles SL4	Lee (HKG) W 2–0 (21-11, 21-11)	Cho (KOR) W 2–0 (21-11, 21-11)	-		Setiawan (INA) L 0–2 (6-21, 16-21)	Did not advance			9
Jyotu Dhar Mohammad Ali Imam	Men's Doubles SL3-SU5	Li / Xiong (CHN) L 0–2 (11-21, 14-21)	Yadav / Sivakumar (IND) L 0–2 (17-21, 17-21)	Did not advance						-

== Swimming ==
One swimmer, Pollob Karokar, represented Bangladesh in this edition of the Games and finished 8th in 100m breaststroke SB8 category.

Men

Athlete	Event	Heat		Final	
Athlete	Event	Result	Rank	Result	Rank
Pollob Karokar	100m Breaststroke SB8	-		1:47.77	8
Pollob Karokar	50m Freestyle S9	31.64	12	Did not advance	

== Table Tennis ==
Bangladesh sent two athletes to compete in Table Tennis. Both of them ended their campaign in group stage.

Player	Event	Group stage					Quarter-finals	Semi-finals	Final	
Player	Event	Opposition Score	Opposition Score	Opposition Score	Opposition Score	Rank	Opposition Score	Opposition Score	Opposition Score	Rank
Mahabub bin Mohiuddin	Men's C3	Jang (KOR) L 0–3	Alshehhi (UAE) L 0–3	Did not advance						-
Soumik Mandal	Men's C10	Su (TPE) L 0–3	Alkaabi (UAE) W 3–1	Sillapakong (THA) L 0–3	Did not advance					-
