= Palestine at the 2026 Asian Para Games =

- Flag of Palestine
- IPC code: PLE
- NPC: Palestinian Paralympic Committee
- Website: www.paralympic.org/npc/palestine

in Aichi-Nagoya, Japan 18 October 2026 – 24 October 2026
- Competitors: 4 (3 men and 1 woman) in 3 sports
- Medals: Gold 0 Silver 0 Bronze 0 Total 0

Asian Para Games appearances
- 2010; 2014; 2018; 2022; 2026

Palestine participated in the 2026 Asian Para Games, in Nagoya, Aichi Prefecture, Japan, from 18 to 24 October 2026. This is Palestine's fifth appearance at the Games.

Palestine sent four athletes comprising three men and one women across three disciplines.

== Medalists ==
Medal	Athlete	Sport	Event	Date

=== Summary ===
Medals by events
Sport	Gold	Silver	Bronze	Total
Total	0	0	0	0

Medals by day
Day	Date	Gold	Silver	Bronze	Total
1	19 October	0	0	0	0
2	20 October	0	0	0	0
3	21 October	0	0	0	0
4	22 October	0	0	0	0
5	23 October	0	0	0	0
6	24 October	0	0	0	0
Total		0	0	0	0

Medals by gender
Gender	Gold	Silver	Bronze	Total
Female	0	0	0	0
Male	0	0	0	0
Mixed	0	0	0	0
Total	0	0	0	0

Multiple medalists
Athlete	Event	1st place, gold medalist(s)	2nd place, silver medalist(s)	3rd place, bronze medalist(s)	Total

== Competitors ==
Following is the list of sports and number of athletes that represented Palestine:

Sport	Men	Women	Total
Athletics	2	-	2
Cycling	1	-	1
Swimming	-	1	1
Total	3	1	4

== Athletics ==
Track events

Athlete	Event	Class	Heat		Final	
Athlete	Event	Class	Result	Rank	Result	Rank
Mustafa Ahmed	Men's 100m	T47	14.37	18	DNQ	
Yazan Hannon	Men's 100m	T36	17.41	10	DNQ	
Mustafa Ahmed	Men's 400 m	T47	1:19.69	13	DNQ	

== Cycling ==
Men

Athlete	Event	Qualifying round		Final	
Athlete	Event	Timing	Rank	Timing	Rank
Alaa Aldali	Men's C1-5 Time Trial	—N/a		32:22.02	16
Alaa Aldali	Men's C1-3 Road Race	—N/a		−1LAP	9

== Swimming ==
Women

Athlete	Event	Heat		Final	
Athlete	Event	Result	Rank	Result	Rank
Hanin Abu Ghosh	50 m freestyle S6	1:24.81	4	1:27.29	8
Hanin Abu Ghosh	100 m freestyle S6	2:56.59	5	3:00.48	8
