= Football 5-a-side at the 2026 Asian Para Games =

- Venue: Tsuruma Park Multipurpose Ground
- Location: Nagoya, Aichi Prefecture, Japan
- Dates: 16–23 October 2026
- Nations: 6

Medalists
gold medal	China
silver medal	Japan
bronze medal	Iran

5-a-side football or blind football was one of the events featured at the 2026 Asian Para Games, which took place at the Tsuruma Park Multipurpose Ground from 16 to 23 October 2026.

== Schedule ==
The schedule is as follows:

G	Group stage	B	Bronze medal match	F	Gold medal match

Event↓/Date →	16th Fri	17th Sat	18th Sun	19th Mon	20th Tue	21st Wed	22nd Thu	23rd Fri	
Men's tournament	G	G	—N/a	G	G	G	—N/a	B	F

== Results ==
=== Group stage ===
Team	Pld	W	D	L	GF	GA	GD	Pts	Qualification
China	5	4	0	1	10	3	+7	12	Gold medal match
Japan	5	4	0	1	10	3	+7	12	Gold medal match
Iran	5	3	0	2	11	4	+7	9	Bronze medal match
Thailand	5	3	0	2	6	3	+3	9	Bronze medal match
South Korea	5	1	0	4	3	8	−5	3	
India	5	0	0	5	1	20	−19	0	

Source: Asian Para Games 2026
16 October 2026
10:00 UTC+9

Japan	0–1	China
	Report

Tsuruma Park Multipurpose Ground, Nagoya
16 October 2026
12:30 UTC+9

India	0–2	South Korea
	Report

Tsuruma Park Multipurpose Ground, Nagoya
16 October 2026
15:00 UTC+9

Thailand	1–0	Iran
	Report

Tsuruma Park Multipurpose Ground, Nagoya

17 October 2026
10:00 UTC+9

Japan	6–1	India
	Report

Tsuruma Park Multipurpose Ground, Nagoya
17 October 2026
12:30 UTC+9

China	2–1	Thailand
	Report

Tsuruma Park Multipurpose Ground, Nagoya
17 October 2026
15:00 UTC+9

South Korea	1–3	Iran
	Report

Tsuruma Park Multipurpose Ground, Nagoya

19 October 2026
10:00 UTC+9

Japan	1–0	South Korea
	Report

Tsuruma Park Multipurpose Ground, Nagoya
19 October 2026
12:30 UTC+9

India	0–3	Thailand
	Report

Tsuruma Park Multipurpose Ground, Nagoya
19 October 2026
15:00 UTC+9

China	0–2	Iran
	Report

Tsuruma Park Multipurpose Ground, Nagoya

20 October 2026
10:00 UTC+9

Japan	1–0	Thailand
	Report

Tsuruma Park Multipurpose Ground, Nagoya
20 October 2026
12:30 UTC+9

China	3–0	South Korea
	Report

Tsuruma Park Multipurpose Ground, Nagoya
20 October 2026
15:00 UTC+9

India	0–5	Iran
	Report

Tsuruma Park Multipurpose Ground, Nagoya

21 October 2026
10:00 UTC+9

South Korea	0–1	Thailand
	Report

Tsuruma Park Multipurpose Ground, Nagoya
21 October 2026
12:30 UTC+9

Japan	2–1	Iran
	Report

Tsuruma Park Multipurpose Ground, Nagoya
21 October 2026
15:00 UTC+9

China	4–0	India
	Report

Tsuruma Park Multipurpose Ground, Nagoya

=== Final round ===
==== Bronze medal match ====
23 October 2026
15:30 UTC+9

Iran	2–1	Thailand
	Report

Tsuruma Park Multipurpose Ground, Nagoya
Attendance: 604
Referee: Vivek Thundiparambil (IND)

==== Gold medal match ====
23 October 2026
13:00 UTC+9

China	1–0	Japan
	Report

Tsuruma Park Multipurpose Ground, Nagoya
Attendance: 757
Referee: Intain Akaradej (THA)

== Final rankings ==
Pos.	Team	Pld	W	D	L	Pts	GF	GA	GD
Gold medal	China (CHN)	6	5	0	1	15	11	3	+8
Silver medal	Japan (JPN)	6	4	0	2	12	10	4	+6
Bronze medal	Iran (IRI)	6	3	0	3	9	13	5	+8
4	Thailand (THA)	6	3	0	3	9	7	5	+2
Eliminated in the Group Stage
5	South Korea (KOR)	5	1	0	4	3	1	11	−10
6	India (IND)	5	0	0	5	0	0	12	−12

== Medalists ==
Event	Gold	Silver	Bronze
Men's team	China (CHN): Wang Shiao; Tang Zhihua; Liu Meng; Qin Ren; Zhang Jiabin; Zhong Liang; Zhang Jiasong; Yuan Ziqi; Zhu Ruiming; Xu Huachu	Japan (JPN): Kenya Izumi; So Omoto; Kenta Hayashi; Yuki Saito; Masaki Goto; Taichi Hirabayashi; Ryo Kawamura; Hiroto Takahashi; Sodai Hongo; Masashi Kamiyama	Iran (IRI): Mohammad Mirzaei Sousefidi; Mohammadamin Rahimzadeh Arab; Alireza Bakht; Reza Sadri; Hossein Rajab Pour; Morteza Karimiamaleh; Sadegh Rahimighasr; Behzad Zadaliasghari Yengejeh; Ahmad Shahhosseiniardekani; Mohammad Aghajanikhanabbasi

Source: Asian Para Games 2026
