= Syria at the 2026 Asian Para Games =

- IPC code: SYR
- NPC: Syrian Paralympic Committee

in Aichi and Nagoya 18–24 October
- Competitors: 3 in 2 sports
- Medals Ranked 29th: Gold 0 Silver 0 Bronze 1 Total 1

Asian Para Games appearances
- 2010; 2014; 2018; 2022; 2026

Syria competed at the 2026 Asian Para Games in Nagoya, Aichi Prefecture, Japan, from 18 to 24 October 2026. This was Syria's fifth appearance at the Games.

== Competitors ==
The following was the list of number of competitors participated in the Games:

| Sport | Men | Women | Total |
|---|---|---|---|
| Athletics | 2 | 0 | 2 |
| Powerlifting | 1 | 0 | 1 |
| Total | 3 | 0 | 3 |

== Medalist ==
=== Medals by Sport ===
Medals by sport
| Sport | 1st place, gold medalist(s) | 2nd place, silver medalist(s) | 3rd place, bronze medalist(s) | Total |
| Powerlifting | 0 | 0 | 1 | 1 |
| Total | 0 | 0 | 1 | 1 |

=== Medalist ===
| Medal | Name | Sport | Event | Date |
|---|---|---|---|---|
| Bronze | Shadi Issa | Powerlifting | Men's 88kg | 21 Oct |

== Athletics ==
Men's field

| Athlete | Event | Final | |
| Athlete | Event | Result | Rank |
|---|---|---|---|
| Wasim Alrezk | Shot put F56/F57 | DNS | |
| Mohamad Mohamad | Javelin throw F56/F57 | DNS | |
| Mohamad Mohamad | Shot put F56/F57 | DNS | |

== Powerlifting ==
| Athlete | Event | Attempt 1 | Attempt 2 | Attempt 3 | Total | Rank |
|---|---|---|---|---|---|---|
| Shadi Issa | Men's 88 kg | 198 | 205 | 208 | 208 | 3rd place, bronze medalist(s) |
