= I Kadek Dwi Purwana Yasa =

Indonesian para-athlete

Personal information
- Nationality: Indonesian
- Born: March 20, 2008 (age 18) Mengwi, Bali, Indonesia

Sport
- Sport: Para-athletics
- Disability class: F57
- Events: Discus throw, javelin throw, shot put
Medal record
Men's para athletics
Representing Indonesia
Asian Para Games
Gold medal – first place	2026 Aichi–Nagoya	Discus throw F57
ASEAN Para Games
Gold medal – first place	2025 Nakhon Ratchasima	Discus throw F57
Silver medal – second place	2025 Nakhon Ratchasima	Javelin throw F57
Silver medal – second place	2025 Nakhon Ratchasima	Shot put F57
Asian Youth Para Games
Gold medal – first place	2025 Dubai	Discus throw F57
Gold medal – first place	2025 Dubai	Javelin throw F57
Gold medal – first place	2025 Dubai	Shot put F57

I Kadek Dwi Purwana Yasa (born 20 March 2008) is an Indonesian para-athletics athlete who competes in the F57 classification. He competes primarily in the discus throw, and has also competed in the javelin throw and shot put.

In 2026, Yasa won the gold medal in the men's F57 discus throw at the 2026 Asian Para Games in Nagoya, Japan, setting a new world record of 49.75 metres. The performance improved his own previous world record of 48.68 metres, set at the World Para Athletics Grand Prix in Tlaxcala, Mexico, in July 2026.

== Career ==
=== International career ===
In 2025, Yasa competed at the World Para Athletics Grand Prix in Tunisia, winning silver medals in the F57 discus throw and javelin throw. He later competed at the 2025 World Para Athletics Championships in India, where he finished fifth in the discus throw.

At the 2025 Asian Youth Para Games in Dubai, United Arab Emirates, Yasa competed in the discus throw, javelin throw and shot put. He won three gold medals, becoming one of Indonesia's successful athletes at the event.

In January 2026, Yasa made his debut at the 2025 ASEAN Para Games in Nakhon Ratchasima, Thailand. He competed in the discus throw, javelin throw and shot put, with the discus throw described as his strongest event.

=== World record and Asian Para Games ===
At the World Para Athletics Grand Prix in Tlaxcala, Mexico, in July 2026, Purwana Yasa won the men's F57 discus throw and set a world record with a throw of 48.68 metres. He was part of an Indonesian para-athletics team that won 16 medals at the competition.

At the 2026 Asian Para Games in Nagoya, Japan, Yasa competed in the men's F57 discus throw. He won the gold medal with a throw of 49.75 metres, improving his own world record by 1.07 metres. His winning throw came on his third attempt. Uzbekistan's Yorkinbek Odilov finished second with 45.10 metres, while Iraq's Hussein Khazaee finished third with 45.06 metres.

The victory was Indonesia's second gold medal of the 2026 Asian Para Games. Yasa said that he dedicated the medal to his parents.

== Personal life ==
Yasa lost his right leg as a young child following a traffic accident and competes using a prosthetic limb.
