= Vietnam at the 2026 Asian Para Games =

- IPC code: VIE
- NPC: Vietnam Paralympic Association
- Website: https://paralympic.org.vn/

in Aichi and Nagoya, Japan 18–24 October 2026
- Competitors: 21 (11 men and 10 women) in 5 sports
- Medals Ranked 20th: Gold 1 Silver 2 Bronze 2 Total 5

Asian Para Games appearances (overview)
- 2010; 2014; 2018; 2022; 2026

Vietnam participated in the 2026 Asian Para Games held in Nagoya, Aichi Prefecture, Japan, from 18 to 24 October 2026. This was Vietnam's fifth appearance at the Games. Vietnam fielded 21 athletes to compete at the Games.

Swimmers Thanh Hai Do and Tien Dat Le won gold and silver medals, respectively in Men's 100m Breaststroke SB5.

== Medalists ==
Medal	Athlete	Sport	Event	Date
(gold) Gold	Thanh Hai Do	Swimming	Men's 100m Breaststroke SB5	21 October
(silver) Silver	Tien Dat Le	Swimming	Men's 100m Breaststroke SB5	21 October
(silver) Silver	Van Cong Le	Powerlifting	Men's Up to 49kg	19 October
(bronze) Bronze	Thi Ngoc Thuy Nguyen	Athletics	Women's Javelin Throw F52/F53/F54	19 October
(bronze) Bronze	Thi Ngoc Thuy Nguyen	Athletics	Women's Discus Throw F54	22 October

=== Summary ===
Medals by events
Sport	Gold	Silver	Bronze	Total
Swimming	1	1	0	2
Powerlifting	0	1	0	1
Athletics	0	0	2	2
Total	1	2	2	5

Medals by day
Day	Date	Gold	Silver	Bronze	Total
1	19 October	0	1	1	2
2	20 October	0	0	0	0
3	21 October	1	1	0	2
4	22 October	0	0	1	1
5	23 October	0	0	0	0
6	24 October	0	0	0	0
Total		1	2	2	5

Medals by gender
Gender	Gold	Silver	Bronze	Total
Female	0	0	2	2
Male	1	2	0	3
Mixed	0	0	0	0
Total	1	2	2	5

Multiple medalists
Athlete	Event	1st place, gold medalist(s)	2nd place, silver medalist(s)	3rd place, bronze medalist(s)	Total
Thi Ngoc Thuy Nguyen	Athletics	0	0	2	2

== Competitors ==
The following is a list of the number of competitors representing Vietnam at the Asian Para Games:

Sport	Men	Women	Total
Athletics	2	5	7
Badminton	1	-	1
Powerlifting	2	2	4
Swimming	5	2	7
Table tennis	1	1	2
Total	11	10	21

== Athletics ==
Track events
Men

Athlete	Event	Class	Heat		Final	
Athlete	Event	Class	Result	Rank	Result	Rank
Ngoc Hiep Nguyen	400 m	T47	54.52 PB	1Q	55.04	4

Women

Athlete	Event	Class	Heat		Final	
Athlete	Event	Class	Result	Rank	Result	Rank
Ngoc Hiep Nguyen	400 m	T47	54.52 PB	1Q	55.04	4

Field events
Men

Athlete	Event	Class	Heat		Final	
Athlete	Event	Class	Result	Rank	Result	Rank
Ngoc Hiep Nguyen	Long Jump	T11	-		5.16 SB	4
Viet Dai Nguyen	Javelin Throw	F33/34	-		21.26	5
Viet Dai Nguyen	Shot Put	F34	-		7.26	6

Women

Athlete	Event	Class	Heat		Final	
Athlete	Event	Class	Result	Rank	Result	Rank
Thi Thuy Hang Tran	Discus Throw	F44	-		24.86 SB	7
Thi Ngoc Thuy Nguyen	Discus Throw	F54	-		14.65	3rd place, bronze medalist(s)
Bich Van Truong	Discus Throw	F56	17.61 SB	4q	17.53	9
Thi Hai Nguyen	Discus Throw	F57	-		25.92	8
Thi Kieu Nguyen	Discus Throw	F57	-		21.40	10
Thi Thuy Hang Tran	Shot Put	F44			7.45	8
Bich Van Truong	Shot Put	F56	-		5.92	8
Thi Hai Nguyen	Shot Put	F57	-		8.59	7
Thi Ngoc Thuy Nguyen	Javelin Throw	F54	-		12.16	3rd place, bronze medalist(s)
Bich Van Truong	Javelin Throw	F56	13.49 SB	6	Did not advance	

== Powerlifting ==
Men

Athlete	Event	Attempt 1	Attempt 2	Attempt 3	Final Score	Rank
Van Chong Le	Up to 49kg	171	~~176~~	~~178~~	171	2nd place, silver medalist(s)
Binh An Nguyen	Up to 54kg	~~160~~	160	~~166~~	160	4

Women

Athlete	Event	Attempt 1	Attempt 2	Attempt 3	Final Score	Rank
Thi Linh Phuong Dang	Up to 50kg	98	~~106~~	~~114~~	98	5
Hoang Tuyet Loan Chau	Up to 55kg	98	103	108	108	4

Mixed

Athlete	Event	Attempt 1	Attempt 2	Attempt 3	Final Score	Rank
Van Chong Le Hoang Tuyet Loan Chau Binh An Nguyen	Mixed Team Event	101	154	163	354.52	6

== Swimming ==
Men

Athlete	Event	Heat		Final	
Athlete	Event	Result	Rank	Result	Rank
Thanh Hai Do	100m Backstroke S6	1:33.28	8Q	1:46.67	8
Thanh Hai Do	100m Breaststroke SB5	-		1:33.91	1st place, gold medalist(s)
Thanh Hai Do	100m Freestyle S6	1:36.78	12	Did not advance	
Thanh Hai Do	200m Individual Medley SM6	-		3:08.46	5
Thanh Hai Do	400m Freestyle S6	6:00.49	7Q	5:49.32	6
Thanh Hai Do	50m Butterfly S6	DSQ		Did not advance	
Thanh Hai Do	50m Freestyle S6	36.53	8Q	35.79	8
Tien Dat Le	100m Breaststroke SB5	-		1:36.63	2nd place, silver medalist(s)
Tien Dat Le	50m Freestyle S6	37.94	10	Did not advance	
Van Hiep Ha	50m Breaststroke SB3	-		1:06.44	5
Van Hiep Ha	50m Freestyle S4	59.81	7Q	59.04	7
Van Hiep Ha	50m Backstroke S5	58.77 GR	10	Did not advance	
Van Dao Ho	100m Backstroke S8	-		1:21.63	6
Van Dao Ho	100m Breaststroke SB7	-		1:40.92	5
Van Dao Ho	100m Freestyle S8	1:26.98	9	Did not advance	
Van Dao Ho	400m Freestyle S8	5:33.20	6Q	5:33.28	7
Van Dao Ho	50m Freestyle S8	39.37	10	Did not advance	
Thanh Tung Vo	100m Breaststroke SB4	2:06.42	5Q	2:03.59	5
Thanh Tung Vo	50m Backstroke S5	45.11	7Q	43.98	7
Thanh Tung Vo	50m Butterfly S5	51.18	10	Did not advance	
Thanh Tung Vo	50m Freestyle S5	37.90	7Q	37.27	7

Women

Athlete	Event	Heat		Final	
Athlete	Event	Result	Rank	Result	Rank
Thi Bich Nhu Trinh	100m Breaststroke SB5	-		1:51.31	4
Thi Bich Nhu Trinh	100m Freestyle S6	1:25.66	3	1:26.31	4
Thi Bich Nhu Trinh	200m Individual Medley SM6	-		3:34.08	5
Thi Bich Nhu Trinh	50m Butterfly S6	39.62	2	38.88	4
Thi Bich Nhu Trinh	50m Freestyle S6	-		42.64	4
Thi Hang Vi	100m Breaststroke SB6	-		1:52.83	5
Thi Hang Vi	100m Freestyle S7	1:23.24	4	1:19.66	4
Thi Hang Vi	50m Butterfly S7	-		41.17	4
Thi Hang Vi	50m Freestyle S8	37.40	2	37.39	4
