= Turkmenistan at the 2026 Asian Para Games =

- Turkmenistan flag
- IPC code: TKM
- NPC: National Paralympic Committee of Turkmenistan
- Website: sportcom.gov.tm/en/federation/

in Aichi-Nagoya, Japan 18 October 2026 – 24 October 2026
- Competitors: 3 (2 men and 1 woman) in 1 sport
- Medals: Gold 0 Silver 0 Bronze 0 Total 0

Asian Para Games appearances
- 2010; 2014; 2018; 2022; 2026

Turkmenistan competed in the 2026 Asian Para Games, held in Nagoya, Aichi Prefecture, Japan, from 18 to 24 October 2026. This was Turkmenistan's fifth appearance at the Games. A total of 3 athletes competed in one discipline.

== Medalists ==
Medal	Athlete	Sport	Event	Date

=== Summary ===
Medals by events
Sport	Gold	Silver	Bronze	Total
Total	0	0	0	0

Medals by day
Day	Date	Gold	Silver	Bronze	Total
1	19 October	0	0	0	0
2	20 October	0	0	0	0
3	21 October	0	0	0	0
4	22 October	0	0	0	0
5	23 October	0	0	0	0
6	24 October	0	0	0	0
Total		0	0	0	0

Medals by gender
Gender	Gold	Silver	Bronze	Total
Male	0	0	0	0
Female	0	0	0	0
Mixed	0	0	0	0
Total	0	0	0	0

Multiple medalists
Athlete	Event	1st place, gold medalist(s)	2nd place, silver medalist(s)	3rd place, bronze medalist(s)	Total

== Competitors ==
Following is the list of sports and number of athletes that participated in the edition:

Sport	Men	Women	Total
Powerlifting	2	1	3
Total	2	1	3

== Powerlifting ==
Men

Athlete	Event	Attempt 1	Attempt 2	Attempt 3	Total	Rank
Sergey Meladze	Up to 72 kg	145	151	~~157~~	151	8
Ishkuvvat Charyyev	Up to 107 kg	185	190	~~195~~	190	6

Women

Athlete	Event	Attempt 1	Attempt 2	Attempt 3	Total	Rank
Mayagozel Ekeyeva	Up to 86 kg	105	110	~~116~~	110	6
