= Aira Kinoshita =

Japanese Paralympic swimmer (born 2006)

Personal information
- Native name: 木下あいら
- Nationality: Japanese
- Born: 11 August 2006 (age 20) Suita, Osaka, Japan

Sport
- Sport: Para swimming
- Disability class: S14, SM14
Medal record
Women's paralympic swimming
Representing Japan
Paralympic Games
Bronze medal – third place	2024 Paris	200 m medley SM14
World Championships
Silver medal – second place	2023 Manchester	200 m medley SM14
Asian Para Games
Gold medal – first place	2026 Aichi–Nagoya	200 m freestyle S14
Gold medal – first place	2026 Aichi–Nagoya	100 m backstroke S14
Gold medal – first place	2026 Aichi–Nagoya	100 m breaststroke SB14

Aira Kinoshita (木下 あいら, Kinoshita Aira; born 11 August 2006) is a Japanese Paralympic swimmer. She represented Japan at the 2024 Summer Paralympics.

== Career ==
Kinoshita represented Japan at the 2023 World Para Swimming Championships and won a silver medal in the 200 metre individual medley SM14 event with an Asian record time of 2:24.32.

Kinoshita represented Japan at the 2024 Summer Paralympics and won a bronze medal in the 200 metre individual medley SM14 event.
