= Powerlifting at the 2026 Asian Para Games =

- Venue: Nagoya City Trade and Industry Center
- Location: Nagoya, Japan
- Dates: 19–24 October 2026

Powerlifting at the 2026 Asian Para Games is holding in Nagoya, Japan between 19 and 24 October 2026.

== Nations ==
165 powerlifters from 26 nations to compete in this edition of Asian Para Games:

Nations	Men											Women											Mixed	Total
Nations	49	54	59	65	72	80	88	97	107	107+	Team	41	45	50	55	61	67	73	79	86	86+	Team	Team	Total
Afghanistan (AFG)			1				1																	2
Bahrain (BRN)										1			1											2
China (CHN)	1	1	1	2	1	1	1	1	1		X	1	1	2	1	1		1	1	1	1	X	X	20
Chinese Taipei (TPE)				1													1		1					3
India (IND)			2	1	1								1			2	1					1		8
Indonesia (INA)	1	1	1	1								2				1				1	2	X	X	10
Iran (IRI)			1	1	1		1	1	1	2	X								1		1		X	10
Iraq (IRQ)		1	1		1	1	1	1		1	X					1			1	1	1		X	11
Japan (JPN)	1				1	2	1		1		X			1	1			1	1				X	10
Jordan (JOR)	1	1	1					1		1									1	1				7
Kazakhstan (KAZ)	2	1	1			1	1	2			X	1	2	1	1	1		1				X	X	15
Kyrgyzstan (KGZ)				1		1															1			3
Malaysia (MAS)					1				1															2
Mongolia (MGL)									1															1
Nepal (NEP)	1												1											2
Pakistan (PAK)						1																		
Philippines (PHI)			1				1	1				1	1											
Saudi Arabia (KSA)		1								1														
South Korea (KOR)	1					1				1	X	1	1				1	1		1	2	X	X	10
Syria (SYR)							1																	1
Tajikistan (TJK)				1																1				2
Thailand (THA)				1		1									1	1	1		1			X	X	6
Turkmenistan (TKM)					1				1															2
United Arab Emirates (UAE)	1	1			1	1	1	1	1	1	X				1		2							11
Uzbekistan (UZB)						1	1	1	1	1	X	1		2	1	2	1	2		1		X	X	15
Vietnam (VIE)	1	1												1	1									
Total	10	8	10	9	8	11	10	9	8	9	7	7	8	7	7	9	7	6	7	7	8	7	10	165

== Medal table ==
* Host nation (Japan)

Rank	Nation	Gold	Silver	Bronze	Total
1	China (CHN)	10	7	5	22
2	Uzbekistan (UZB)	5	2	3	10
3	Iraq (IRQ)	2	2	0	4
4	Jordan (JOR)	2	0	2	4
5	Iran (IRI)	1	5	2	8
6	Kazakhstan (KAZ)	1	2	3	6
7	Malaysia (MAS)	1	0	0	1
7	Mongolia (MGL)	1	0	0	1
9	Indonesia (INA)	0	2	5	7
10	India (IND)	0	2	0	2
11	Vietnam (VIE)	0	1	0	1
12	South Korea (KOR)	0	0	1	1
12	Syria (SYR)	0	0	1	1
12	Thailand (THA)	0	0	1	1
Totals (14 entries)		23	23	23	69

== Medalists ==
=== Men ===
Event	Gold		Silver		Bronze	
49 kg	Omar Qarada; Jordan	176	Lê Văn Công; Vietnam	171	Chen Liuxun; China	161
54 kg	David Degtyarev; Kazakhstan	191 AR	Yang Jinglang; China	189	Hilman; Indonesia	165
59 kg	Mustafa Radhi; Iraq	212 WR	Qi Yongkai; China	184	Stanislav Shakiyev; Kazakhstan	181
65 kg	Zou Yi; China	216	Ashok; India	192	Margono; Indonesia	177
72 kg	Bonnie Bunyau Gustin; Malaysia	225	Zhang Pingkang; China	212	Mohsen Bakhtiar; Iran	208
80 kg	Bekzod Jamilov; Uzbekistan	229	Rasool Mohsin; Iraq	222	Gu Xiaofei; China	215
88 kg	Yan Panpan; China	244 GR	Roohallah Rostami; Iran	243	Shadi Issa; Syria	208
97 kg	Abdelkareem Khattab; Jordan	241	Ye Jixiong; China	237	Aliasghar Abareghi; Iran	220
107 kg	Sodnompiljee Enkhbayar; Mongolia	246	Aliakbar Gharibshahi; Iran	245	Liu Jian; China	231
+107 kg	Ahmad Aminzadeh; Iran	260	Mahdi Sayadi; Iran	240	Ilkhom Khalimov; Uzbekistan	223
Team	China (CHN); Zhou Siwei; Qi Yongkai; Zhang Pingkang		Iraq (IRQ); Rasool Mohsin; Muslim Al-Sudani; Mustafa Radhi		Kazakhstan (KAZ); Yerbolat Karibay; Stanislav Shakiyev; David Degtyarev	

=== Women ===
Event	Gold		Silver		Bronze	
41 kg	Cui Zhe; China	120	Tursynay Kabyl; Kazakhstan	104	Ni Nengah Widiasih; Indonesia	97
45 kg	Guo Lingling; China	126 WR	Alina Solodukhina; Kazakhstan	103	Aizhan Berimkulova; Kazakhstan	101
50 kg	Xiao Peiqing; China	124 AR	Nasiba Tashpulatova; Uzbekistan	123	Lang Yurong; China	113
55 kg	Akidakhon Akhtamova; Uzbekistan	128 GR	Xiao Cuijuan; China	117	Kamolpan Kararatpet; Thailand	112
61 kg	Muslima Nuriddinova; Uzbekistan	129	Chen Sijia; China	126	Shebrioni; Indonesia	115
67 kg	Rukhshona Uktamova; Uzbekistan	127	Kasthuri Rajamani; India	108	Kim Hyeong-hui; South Korea	107
73 kg	Ruza Kuzieva; Uzbekistan	152 WR	Tan Yujiao; China	146	Kudratoy Toshpulatova; Uzbekistan	130
79 kg	Han Miaoyu; China	152 AR	Zahra Aghaeisamani; Iran	133	Asma Issa; Jordan	129
86 kg	Zheng Feifei; China	155 GR	Orzugul Urolova; Uzbekistan	136	Tharwat Alhajjaj; Jordan	129
+86 kg	Zhu Wenjun; China	164 AR	Nikoo Rozbahani; Iran	155	Elsa Dewi Saputri; Indonesia	130
Team	China (CHN); Zheng Feifei; Guo Lingling; Zhu Wenjun		Indonesia (INA); Shebrioni; Siti Mahmudah; Sriyanti		Uzbekistan (UZB); Rukhshona Uktamova; Kudratoy Toshpulatova; Ruza Kuzieva	

=== Mixed ===
Event	Gold	Silver	Bronze
Team	Iraq (IRQ); Zahraa Al-Obaidi; Muslim Al-Sudani; Mustafa Radhi	Indonesia (INA); Ni Nengah Widiasih; Hilman; Abdul Hadi	China (CHN); Tan Yuijao; Zou Yi; Yan Panpan

== See also ==
- Weightlifting at the 2026 Asian Games
