= Supriadi =

Supriadi is an Indonesian surname. Notable people with the surname include:

- Mochammad Supriadi (born 2002), Indonesian football player
- Tedi Supriadi (born 1996), Indonesian badminton player

== See also ==
- Supriyadi
