= Leli Marlina =

Indonesian para table tennis player

Personal information
- Nationality: Indonesian
- Born: 6 November 1998 (age 27) Kuantan Singingi, Riau, Indonesia

Sport
- Country: Indonesia
- Sport: Para table tennis
- Disability class: C5
Medal record
Para table tennis
Representing Indonesia
World Abilitysport Games
Gold medal – first place	2023 Nakhon Ratchasima	Women's singles class 5
Gold medal – first place	2023 Nakhon Ratchasima	Mixed doubles class 10
Asian Para Games
Gold medal – first place	2026 Aichi–Nagoya	Mixed doubles XD10
Bronze medal – third place	2026 Aichi–Nagoya	Women's doubles WD10
ASEAN Para Games
Gold medal – first place	2022 Surakarta	Women's doubles TT5
Gold medal – first place	2022 Surakarta	Women's singles TT5
Gold medal – first place	2023 Cambodia	Women's team TT5
Gold medal – first place	2023 Cambodia	Women's doubles TT5
Gold medal – first place	2023 Cambodia	Women's singles TT5
Silver medal – second place	2022 Surakarta	Women's doubles TT5
Silver medal – second place	2023 Cambodia	Mixed TT5

Leli Marlina (born 6 November 1998) is an Indonesian para table tennis player. She represented Indonesia at the 2024 Summer Paralympics.
