= 2026 Asian Para Games =

Multi-sport event in Aichi and Nagoya, Japan

5th Asian Para Games
- Host city: Aichi Prefecture and Nagoya, Japan
- Motto: Imagine One Heart (こころを、ひとつに, Kokoro o, hitotsu ni)
- Nations: 45
- Athletes: 2,590
- Events: 489 in 18 sports (19 disciplines)
- Opening: 18 October 2026
- Closing: 24 October 2026
- Opened by: Naruhito; Emperor of Japan
- Closed by: Majid Rashed; President of the Asian Paralympic Committee
- Torch lighter: Maya Nakanishi; Miyake Katsumi; Momoka Muraoka
- Main venue: Paloma Mizuho Stadium
- Website: asianparagames-2026.org

The 2026 Asian Para Games (2026年アジアパラ競技大会, 2026-Nen ajiapara kyōgi taikai), also known as the 5th Asian Para Games and commonly known as Aichi-Nagoya 2026, was a multi-sport event for Asian athletes with disabilities that paralleled the 2026 Asian Games, being held from 18 to 24 October 2026 around Aichi Prefecture in Japan. Nagoya, the capital city of Aichi Prefecture, was the first Japanese city to host the Asian Para Games. The event returned to its traditional four-year cycle, after the 2022 edition was postponed to 2023 due to the COVID-19 pandemic.

China led the medal tally for the fifth consecutive time. For the first time in Asian Para Games history, all 45 National Paralympic Committees who are members of the Asian Paralympic Committee sent delegations. In addition, Cambodia and Tajikistan won their first ever Asian Para Games medals. Some 27 world, 81 Asian and 306 Asian Para Games records were broken during the Games.

== Host city ==
As is the tradition of the event, since 2010, the Asian Para Games are usually held after every Asian Games in the same host country. On 29 March 2022, the Asian Paralympic Committee announced that Nagoya and Aichi Prefecture, Japan will host the fifth edition of the Asian Para Games after making a visit there in 2018. The city was previously awarded the 2026 Asian Games on 26 September 2016 by the Olympic Council of Asia.

== Development and preparation ==
=== Venues ===
Hisaya Ōdori Park and Oasis 21 hosted a fan zone, celebration and cultural exchange hub during both Asian and Asian Para Games, known as One Heart World. It was inspired by the Champions Park at Jardins du Trocadéro that was held during the 2024 Summer Olympics in Paris, France.

==== Nagoya ====
| Venue | | Events | Capacity | Status |
|---|---|---|---|---|
| Paloma Mizuho Sports Park | Stadium | Ceremonies | 35,000 | Existing, replacement |
| Paloma Mizuho Sports Park | Stadium | Athletics | 35,000 | Existing, replacement |
| Paloma Mizuho Sports Park | Arena | Taekwondo | 1,158 | Existing |
| Aichi Budokan | | Judo | 1,504 | Existing |
| Aichi International Arena | | Wheelchair basketball | 15,000 (main arena) | New |
| Aichi International Arena | | Wheelchair basketball | 0 (sub-arena) | New |
| Higashiyama Park Tennis Center | | Wheelchair tennis | 4,000 (centre court) | Existing, renovated |
| Inae Sports Center | | Wheelchair Fencing | 2,232 | Existing |
| Nagoya City Trade and Industry Centre | | Powerlifting | TBA | Existing with temporary stands |
| Nippon Gaishi Hall | Rainbow Hall | Boccia | 10,000 | Existing, renovated |
| Nippon Gaishi Hall | Rainbow Pool | Swimming | 3,500 | Existing, renovated |
| Tsuruma Park | | Football 5-a-side | TBA | Temporary |

==== Aichi Prefecture ====
| Venue | | City | Events | Capacity | Status |
|---|---|---|---|---|---|
| Ichinomiya City Municipal Gymnasium | | Ichinomiya | Badminton | 2,002 | Existing |
| Wing Arena Kariya | | Kariya | Wheelchair rugby | 1,576 | Existing |
| Okazaki Central General Park | General Gymnasium | Okazaki | Sitting volleyball | 2,620 | Existing |
| Okazaki Central General Park | Multipurpose Square | Okazaki | Archery | TBA | Temporary |
| Toyohashi City General Gymnasium | | Toyohashi | Goalball | 3,000 | Existing |
| Aichi Prefectural Shooting Range | | Toyota | Shooting | TBA | Existing, renovated |
| Sky Hall Toyota | | Toyota | Table tennis | 6,500 | Existing |

==== Outlying venues ====
| Venue | City | Events | Capacity | Status |
|---|---|---|---|---|
| Izu Velodrome | Izu, Shizuoka Prefecture | Cycling (track) | 3,600 | Existing |
| Japan Cycle Sports Center | Izu, Shizuoka Prefecture | Cycling (road) | —N/a | Existing |

== Ceremonies ==
=== Opening ceremony ===
The opening ceremony was held on 18 October 2026 at 18:00 to 20:00 JST (UTC+09:00) at Paloma Mizuho Stadium. Its theme was "WABI - We are Beautiful Individuals".

=== Closing ceremony ===
The closing ceremony was held on 24 October 2026 at 18:00 to 19:30 JST (UTC+09:00) at Paloma Mizuho Stadium.

== The Games ==
=== Participating Nations ===
Participating National Paralympic Committees
- Afghanistan (5)
- Bahrain (14)
- Bangladesh (11)
- Bhutan (3)
- Brunei (1)
- Cambodia (17)
- China (315)
- North Korea (2)
- Hong Kong (80)
- India (168)
- Indonesia (105)
- Iran (162)
- Iraq (83)
- Japan (322) (host)
- Jordan (13)
- Kazakhstan (145)
- South Korea (215)
- Kuwait (21)
- Kyrgyzstan (16)
- Laos (12)
- Lebanon (2)
- Macau (13)
- Malaysia (63)
- Maldives (3)
- Mongolia (45)
- Myanmar (7)
- Nepal (22)
- Oman (13)
- Pakistan (9)
- Palestine (4)
- Philippines (69)
- Qatar (10)
- Saudi Arabia (41)
- Singapore (20)
- Sri Lanka (22)
- Syria (3)
- Chinese Taipei (71)
- Tajikistan (10)
- Thailand (269)
- Timor-Leste (4)
- Turkmenistan (3)
- United Arab Emirates (45)
- Uzbekistan (148)
- Vietnam (21)
- Yemen (2)

=== Sports ===
- Archery (15)
- Athletics (159)
- Badminton (22)
- Boccia (11)
- Cycling
  - Road (20)
  - Track (14)
- Football 5-a-side (1)
- Goalball (2)
- Judo (16)
- Powerlifting (23)
- Shooting (13)
- Sitting volleyball (2)
- Swimming (114)
- Table tennis (37)
- Taekwondo (10)
- Wheelchair basketball (2)
- Wheelchair fencing (21)
- Wheelchair rugby (1)
- Wheelchair tennis (6)

== Calendar ==
| OC | Opening ceremony | ● | Event competitions | ● | Event finals | CC | Closing ceremony |

| October 2026 | | October | | | | | | | | | Events |
| October 2026 | | 16 Fri | 17 Sat | 18 Sun | 19 Mon | 20 Tue | 21 Wed | 22 Thu | 23 Fri | 24 Sat | Events |
|---|---|---|---|---|---|---|---|---|---|---|---|
| Ceremonies | | | | OC | | | | | | CC | —N/a |
| Archery | | | | | ● | ● | 5 | 5 | 3 | 2 | 15 |
| Athletics | | | | | 13 | 32 | 39 | 33 | 42 | | 159 |
| Badminton | | ● | ● | | ● | ● | ● | ● | 22 | | 22 |
| Boccia | | | ● | | ● | ● | 8 | ● | ● | 3 | 11 |
| Cycling | Road | | | | | | 8 | 6 | 6 | | 20 |
| Cycling | Track | | | | 7 | 7 | | | | | 14 |
| Football 5-a-side | | ● | ● | | ● | ● | ● | | 1 | | 1 |
| Goalball | | | ● | | ● | ● | ● | ● | 2 | | 2 |
| Judo | | | | | 5 | 5 | 6 | | | | 16 |
| Powerlifting | | | | | 5 | 5 | 5 | 5 | 2 | 1 | 23 |
| Shooting | | | | | 3 | 4 | | 3 | 3 | | 13 |
| Sitting volleyball | | | | | ● | ● | ● | ● | 2 | | 2 |
| Swimming | | | | | 23 | 23 | 21 | 24 | 23 | | 114 |
| Table tennis | | ● | ● | | ● | 21 | ● | 8 | 8 | | 37 |
| Taekwondo | | | | | 3 | 4 | 3 | | | | 10 |
| Wheelchair basketball | | ● | ● | | ● | ● | ● | 1 | 1 | | 2 |
| Wheelchair fencing | | | | | 4 | 3 | 4 | 3 | 4 | 3 | 21 |
| Wheelchair rugby | | | | | | ● | ● | ● | 1 | | 1 |
| Wheelchair tennis | | | | | ● | ● | ● | 3 | 3 | | 6 |
| Daily medal events | | 0 | 0 | 0 | 63 | 104 | 99 | 91 | 123 | 9 | 489 |
| Cumulative total | | 0 | 0 | 0 | 63 | 167 | 266 | 357 | 480 | 489 | 489 |
| October 2026 | | October | | | | | | | | | Events |
| October 2026 | | 16 Fri | 17 Sat | 18 Sun | 19 Mon | 20 Tue | 21 Wed | 22 Thu | 23 Fri | 24 Sat | Events |

Source: Aichi-Nagoya 2026

== Medal table ==
The top 10 ranked NPCs at these Games are listed below. Cambodia and Tajikistan won their first-ever Asian Para Games medals, a bronze and a silver, respectively.

* Host nation (Japan)

2026 Asian Para Games medal table
| Rank | NPC | Gold | Silver | Bronze | Total |
|---|---|---|---|---|---|
| 1 | China | 207 | 117 | 111 | 435 |
| 2 | Japan* | 64 | 60 | 62 | 186 |
| 3 | Uzbekistan | 45 | 49 | 51 | 145 |
| 4 | India | 30 | 35 | 49 | 114 |
| 5 | South Korea | 29 | 38 | 33 | 100 |
| 6 | Iran | 26 | 36 | 40 | 102 |
| 7 | Thailand | 19 | 40 | 66 | 125 |
| 8 | Indonesia | 15 | 21 | 37 | 73 |
| 9 | Kazakhstan | 12 | 16 | 22 | 50 |
| 10 | Saudi Arabia | 8 | 8 | 1 | 17 |
| 11–33 | Remaining NPCs | 35 | 66 | 90 | 191 |
| Totals (33 entries) | | 490 | 486 | 562 | 1,538 |

== Marketing ==
=== Emblem ===
The official emblem of the 2026 Asian Para Games, was unveiled on 25 December 2023. It incorporates shapes reminiscent of the Asian Games logo, but with its own unique identity, with few difference in the colors of the Asian Para Games flame and the Japanese flag.

=== Motto ===
The official motto of the 2026 Asian Para Games, "Imagine One Heart" was unveiled on the same day as the emblem. Similar to the motto of the Asian Games, it symbolises how the Asian Para Games works to break down barriers between people, whether they have a disability or not, and shows that we have so much in common that unites us.

=== Mascot ===
The Aichi Nagoya 2026 Asian Para Games organising committee unveiled the event’s official mascot earlier this month to celebrate the two-year countdown until the start of the Games in Japan. Uzumin, based on the words “Uzu” (whirlpool) and “Izumi” (spring), represents the hope that the athletes’ passion will converge like a “whirlwind” in Aichi-Nagoya, and that the emotion born there will emerge like a “spring” and spread throughout Asia.

== Concerns and controversies ==
=== Incorrect national anthems ===
On 21 October 2026, during a press conference, the mayor of Nagoya Ichirō Hirosawa apologised over several instances of incorrect national anthems being played during victory ceremonies. During a victory ceremony for the men's K44 58kg taekwondo event on 19 October, the Iranian anthem was played instead of the anthem for Chinese Taipei. Later on the same day and in the same sport, during a victory ceremony for the women's K44 52kg event, the Iranian anthem was again played erroneously instead of the Mongolian anthem. Furthermore, prior to a sitting volleyball match between China and Iran, the South Korean national anthem was heard for about five seconds before the correct anthem was played. Mayor Hirosawa expressed his regret for the incidents, stating that they were due to faulty playback software at the venues. He also promised investigations into whether double-checking procedures implemented at the Asian Games were being taken.

== See also ==
- 2026 Asian Games
- 2028 Summer Paralympics

== Results Book ==
1. ATH : https://results.apg2026.org/apg2026/reports/ATH-------------------------------.RBK_1_0.pdf
2. SWM : https://results.apg2026.org/apg2026/reports/SWM-------------------------------.RBK_2_0.pdf
3. ARC : https://results.apg2026.org/apg2026/reports/ARC-------------------------------.RBK_1_0.pdf
4. BDM : https://results.apg2026.org/apg2026/reports/BDM-------------------------------.RBK_1_0.pdf
5. BOC : https://results.apg2026.org/apg2026/reports/BOC-------------------------------.RBK_1_0.pdf
6. CYC : https://results.apg2026.org/apg2026/reports/CYC-------------------------------.RBK_1_0.pdf
7. FOT : https://results.apg2026.org/apg2026/reports/FB5-------------------------------.RBK_2_0.pdf
8. GBL : https://results.apg2026.org/apg2026/reports/GBL-------------------------------.RBK_1_0.pdf
9. JUD : https://results.apg2026.org/apg2026/reports/JUD-------------------------------.RBK_1_0.pdf
10. POW : https://results.apg2026.org/apg2026/reports/PWL-------------------------------.RBK_2_0.pdf
11. SHO : https://results.apg2026.org/apg2026/reports/SHO-------------------------------.RBK_1_0.pdf
12. VOL : https://results.apg2026.org/apg2026/reports/VBS-------------------------------.RBK_1_0.pdf
13. TBT : https://results.apg2026.org/apg2026/reports/TTE-------------------------------.RBK_2_0.pdf
14. TKW : https://results.apg2026.org/apg2026/reports/TKW-------------------------------.RBK_1_0.pdf
15. BAS : https://results.apg2026.org/apg2026/reports/WBK-------------------------------.RBK_1_0.pdf
16. FEN : https://results.apg2026.org/apg2026/reports/WFE-------------------------------.RBK_2_0.pdf
17. RUG : https://results.apg2026.org/apg2026/reports/WRU-------------------------------.RBK_1_0.pdf
18. TEN : https://results.apg2026.org/apg2026/reports/WTE-------------------------------.RBK_1_0.pdf
