= Kazakhstan at the 2026 Asian Para Games =

- Kazakhstan flag
- IPC code: KAZ
- NPC: National Paralympic Committee of Kazakhstan
- Website: paralympic.kz/ru/

in Aichi-Nagoya, Japan 18 October 2026 – 24 October 2026
- Competitors: 145 (94 men and 51 women) in 12 sports
- Flag bearer (closing): TBD
- Medals Ranked 6th: Gold 3 Silver 5 Bronze 7 Total 15

Asian Para Games appearances
- 2010; 2014; 2018; 2022; 2026

Kazakhstan will participate in the 2026 Asian Para Games, to be held in Nagoya, Aichi Prefecture, Japan, from 18 to 24 October 2026. This will be Kazakhstan's fifth appearance at the Games.

== Medalists ==
Medal	Athlete	Sport	Event	Date
(gold) Gold	Ibragim Nurmakhanuly	Judo	Men's J2 − 70 kg	19 October
(gold) Gold	Yerkin Gabbasov	Shooting	Men's 10 m air rifle SH1	19 October
(gold) Gold	David Degtyarev	Powerlifting	Men's - 54 kg	20 October
(silver) Silver	Anastassiya Kalaus	Cycling	Women's 4000 m Individual Pursuit	19 October
(silver) Silver	Dias Kenzhebek	Swimming	Men's 100 m Freestyle S10	19 October
(silver) Silver	Ali Turganbekov Siyazbek Daliyev Natalya Zvyagintseva Zulfiya Gabidullina	Swimming	Mixed 4x50m Medley 20 points	19 October
(silver) Silver	Alina Solodukhina	Powerlifting	Women's - 45 kg	20 October
(silver) Silver	Tursynay Kabyl	Powerlifting	Women's - 41 kg	20 October
(bronze) Bronze	Kirill Ilyukevich	Cycling	Men's B 4000m Individual Pursuit	19 October
(bronze) Bronze	Alfiya Tlekkabyl	Judo	Women's J1 -52 kg Final	19 October
(bronze) Bronze	Roman Potapav	Swimming	Men's 100m Backstroke S11	19 October
(bronze) Bronze	Viktor Volkov	Swimming	Men's 100m Freestyle S13	19 October
(bronze) Bronze	Stanislav Shakiyev	Powerlifting	Men's -59 kg	20 October
(bronze) Bronze	Aizhan Berimkulova	Powerlifting	Women's -45 kg	20 October
(bronze) Bronze	Ali Makhulbekov	Table Tennis	Men's Singles - Class 8	20 October

=== Summary ===
Medals by events
Sport	Gold	Silver	Bronze	Total
Powerlifting	1	2	2	5
Judo	1	0	1	2
Shooting	1	0	0	1
Swimming	0	2	2	4
Cycling	0	1	1	2
Table Tennis	0	0	1	1
Total	3	5	7	15

Medals by day
Day	Date	Gold	Silver	Bronze	Total
1	19 October	2	3	4	9
Total		4	5	2	11

Medals by gender
Gender	Gold	Silver	Bronze	Total
Female	0	3	2	5
Male	3	1	5	9'
Mixed		1		1
Total	3	5	7	15

Multiple medalists
Athlete	Event	1st place, gold medalist(s)	2nd place, silver medalist(s)	3rd place, bronze medalist(s)	Total

== Competitors ==
Following is the list of sports and number of athletes that will participate in the upcoming edition:

Sport	Men	Women	Total
Archery	6	3	9
Athletics	10	4	14
Boccia	3	2	5
Cycling	6	2	8
Judo	16	10	26
Powerlifting	8	7	15
Shooting	6	6	12
Volleyball	12	10	22
Swimming	15	6	21
Table Tennis	6	6	12
Taekwondo	4	4	8
Wheelchair Tennis	2	1	3
Total	94	51	145
