= Japan at the 2026 Asian Para Games =

- IOC code: JPN
- NPC: Japanese Paralympic Committee

in Aichi-Nagoya 18–24 October 2026
- Competitors: 285 in 18 sports
- Flag bearers: Moe Nakagawa; Katsuya Hashimoto
- Medals Ranked 2nd: Gold 64 Silver 60 Bronze 62 Total 186

Asian Para Games appearances (overview)
- 2010; 2014; 2018; 2022; 2026

Japan hosted the 2026 Asian Para Games in Aichi-Nagoya, Japan from 18 to 24 October 2026. This was the nation's fifth appearance at the Games. Japan sent 283 athletes to compete across all 18 sports. The nation delivered its best performance at the games, finishing 2nd overall with a record 64 gold, 60 silver, and 62 bronze medals. Para athlete Moe Nakagawa and wheelchair rugby player Katsuya Hashimoto served as the nation's flag-bearers during the opening ceremony.

== Background ==
Japanese Paralympic Committee assigned Hiroyuki Misaka, as head of mission for the Japanese contingent. He worked alongside deputy head of the Japanese national delegation Ayumi Tanimoto and Yukitaka Takizawa. For Japan, this marked their first time hosting the Asian Para Games. They aimed to surpass their previous medal tallies, a goal they successfully achieved. In the country, the event was broadcast by Chukyo TV and other platforms.

== Medalists ==
The following Japan competitors won medals at the Games.

| Medal | Name | Sport | Event | Date |
|---|---|---|---|---|
| Gold | Shizuka Hangai | Judo | Women's 52 kg J1 | 19 October |
| Gold | Shota Kawamoto | Cycling | Men's 3000 m individual pursuit C2 | 19 October |
| Gold | Ayano Tsujiuchi | Swimming | Women's 100 m freestyle S13 | 19 October |
| Gold | Aira Kinoshita | Swimming | Women's 200 m freestyle S14 | 19 October |
| Gold | Takayuki Suzuki | Swimming | Men's 50 m freestyle S4 | 19 October |
| Gold | Kenya Karasawa | Athletics | Men's 5000 m T11 | 19 October |
| Gold | Tomomi Tozawa | Athletics | Women's long jump T63 | 19 October |
| Gold | Kengo Oshima | Athletics | Men's 200 m T64 | 19 October |
| Gold | Kazuhei Kimura | Cycling | Men's 3000 m individual pursuit C2 | 19 October |
| Gold | Miya Yamaguchi | Table tennis | Women's singles C11 | 20 October |
| Gold | Mahiro Funayama | Table tennis | Men's singles C10 | 20 October |
| Gold | Koyo Iwabuchi | Table tennis | Men's singles C9 | 20 October |
| Gold | Aira Kinoshita | Swimming | Women's 100 m backstroke S14 | 20 October |
| Gold | Takayuki Suzuki | Swimming | Men's 50 m breaststroke SB3 | 20 October |
| Gold | Akito Minai | Swimming | Men's 200 m individual medley SM10 | 20 October |
| Gold | Genki Saito | Swimming | Men's 100 m breaststroke SB13 | 20 October |
| Gold | Tomoki Sato | Athletics | Men's 100 m T51/T52 | 21 October |
| Gold | Kengo Oshima | Athletics | Men's 100 m T64 | 21 October |
| Gold | Yuta Wakoh | Athletics | Men's javelin throw F12/F13 | 21 October |
| Gold | Shota Kawamoto | Cycling | Men's time trial C1-5 | 21 October |
| Gold | Ryota Fukunaga | Athletics | Men's long jump T13 | 21 October |
| Gold | Saki Takakuwa | Athletics | Women's 100 m T64 | 21 October |
| Gold | Akito Minai | Swimming | Men's 100 m butterfly S10 | 21 October |
| Gold | Naohide Yamaguchi | Swimming | Men's 100 m breaststroke SB14 | 21 October |
| Gold | Ryutaro Kuno | Athletics | Men's 100 m T12 | 21 October |
| Gold | Hajime Kondo | Athletics | Men's long jump T42/T61/T63 | 21 October |
| Gold | Taiyo Kawabuchi | Swimming | Men's 400 m freestyle S9 | 21 October |
| Gold | Aira Kinoshita | Swimming | Women's 100 m breaststroke SB14 | 21 October |
| Gold | An Nishida | Swimming | Women's 50 m butterfly S7 | 21 October |
| Gold | Takashi Asano; Natsuki Wada | Table tennis | Mixed doubles XD22 | 22 October |
| Gold | Tomoki Sato | Athletics | Men's 400 m T51/T52 | 22 October |
| Gold | Daiki Ishiyama | Athletics | Men's 400 m T12 | 22 October |
| Gold | Shota Kawano; Kei Usami | Wheelchair tennis | Quad doubles | 22 October |
| Gold | Kotaro Ogiwara | Swimming | Men's 100 m backstroke S8 | 22 October |
| Gold | Akito Minai | Swimming | Men's 400 m freestyle S10 | 22 October |
| Gold | Daisuke Arai; Tokito Oda | Wheelchair tennis | Men's doubles | 22 October |
| Gold | Kenya Karasawa | Athletics | Men's 1500 m T11 | 22 October |
| Gold | Keiichi Kimura | Swimming | Men's 50 m freestyle S11 | 22 October |
| Gold | Kanon Fukuda | Swimming | Women's 100 m breaststroke SB8 | 22 October |
| Gold | Aira Kinoshita; Toshihiro Naoi; Rira Sato; Naohide Yamaguchi | Swimming | Mixed 4 × 100 m freestyle relay S14 | 22 October |
| Gold | Hina Sawada | Athletics | Women's 1500 m T20 | 23 October |
| Gold | Tomoya Ito | Athletics | Men's 200 m T51/T52 | 23 October |
| Gold | Hotaka Kato | Athletics | Men's 1500 m T38 | 23 October |
| Gold | Natsuki Wada; Miya Yamaguchi | Table tennis | Women's doubles WD22 | 23 October |
| Gold | Shota Kawamoto | Cycling | Men's road race C1-3 | 23 October |
| Gold | Daiki Kajiwara | Badminton | Men's singles WH2 | 23 October |
| Gold | Sarina Satomi | Badminton | Women's singles WH1 | 23 October |
| Gold | Shino Kawai | Badminton | Women's singles SL3 | 23 October |
| Gold | Hayuma Abe; Koyo Iwabuchi | Table tennis | Men's doubles MD18 | 23 October |
| Gold | Kei Usami | Wheelchair tennis | Quad singles | 23 October |
| Gold | Ayano Tsujiuchi | Swimming | Women's 200 m individual medley SM13 | 23 October |
| Gold | Uchu Tomita | Swimming | Men's 100 m freestyle S11 | 23 October |
| Gold | Aira Kinoshita | Swimming | Women's 200 m individual medley SM14 | 23 October |
| Gold | Tokito Oda | Wheelchair tennis | Men's singles | 23 October |
| Gold | Haruki Torii; Yuji Taguchi; Haruki Nagano; Kazuya Kaneko; Koji Miyajiki; Keisuke Yukuhiro | Goalball | Men's tournament | 23 October |
| Gold | Naohide Yamaguchi | Swimming | Men's 200 m individual medley SM14 | 23 October |
| Gold | Genki Saito | Swimming | Men's 100 m butterfly S12 | 23 October |
| Gold | Keiichi Kimura | Swimming | Men's 100 m butterfly S11 | 23 October |
| Gold | Takayuki Suzuki | Swimming | Men's 100 m freestyle S4 | 23 October |
| Gold | Renshi Chokai; Yoshinobu Takamatsu; Koki Maruyama; Rin Kawahara; Takuya Furusawa; Ryuga Akaishi; Taiga Kitakaze; Takuma Taniguchi; Shinsaku Iwata; Naohiro Murakami; Takayoshi Iwai; Satoshi Shiota | Wheelchair basketball | Men's tournament | 23 October |
| Gold | Yudai Shimazu | Athletics | Men's 5000 m T12/T13 | 23 October |
| Gold | Reina Hori | Athletics | Women's shot put F20 | 23 October |
| Gold | Rio Kawaguchi | Athletics | Women's long jump T20 | 23 October |
| Gold | Sayaka Sekine; Kazuki Takahashi | Boccia | Mixed pairs BC3 | 24 October |
| Silver | Keiko Sugiura | Cycling | Women's 3000 m individual pursuit C1-3 | 19 October |
| Silver | Kazuhei Kimura | Cycling | Men's 4000 m individual pursuit B | 19 October |
| Silver | Tae Kawabe | Swimming | Women's 100 m freestyle S10 | 19 October |
| Silver | Shinya Wada | Athletics | Men's 5000 m T11 | 19 October |
| Silver | Kaede Maegawa | Athletics | Women's long jump T63 | 19 October |
| Silver | Shunsuke Itani | Athletics | Men's 200 m T64 | 19 October |
| Silver | Niina Kanno | Athletics | Women's 400 m T20 | 20 October |
| Silver | Ryota Fukunaga | Athletics | Men's 100 m T13 | 20 October |
| Silver | Atsumi Nishimura | Judo | Women's 70 kg J1 | 20 October |
| Silver | Yuri Tomono | Table tennis | Women's singles C8 | 20 October |
| Silver | Hayuma Abe | Table tennis | Men's singles C8 | 20 October |
| Silver | Katsuyoshi Yagi | Table tennis | Men's singles C7 | 20 October |
| Silver | Shunsuke Kudo | Taekwondo | Men's 70 kg | 20 October |
| Silver | Kotone Matsunaga | Swimming | Women's 200 m individual medley SM10 | 20 October |
| Silver | Ayano Tsujiuchi | Swimming | Women's 100 m breaststroke SB13 | 20 October |
| Silver | Rira Sato | Swimming | Women's 100 m backstroke S14 | 20 October |
| Silver | Kotone Matsunaga | Swimming | Women's 100 m backstroke S10 | 20 October |
| Silver | Uchu Tomita | Swimming | Men's 400 m freestyle S11 | 20 October |
| Silver | Genki Saito | Swimming | Men's 100 m backstroke S12 | 20 October |
| Silver | Akito Minai | Swimming | Men's 100 m backstroke S10 | 20 October |
| Silver | Yuki Oya | Athletics | Men's 100 m T51/T52 | 21 October |
| Silver | Daiki Ishiyama | Athletics | Men's 100 m T12 | 21 October |
| Silver | Takeru Matsumoto | Athletics | Men's 400 m T36 | 21 October |
| Silver | Keiko Sugiura | Cycling | Women's time trial C1-5 | 21 October |
| Silver | Tomomi Tozawa | Athletics | Women's 100 m T63 | 21 October |
| Silver | Chie Yamashita | Athletics | Women's 100 m T64 | 21 October |
| Silver | Kazusa Ogawa | Judo | Women's 70 kg J2 | 21 October |
| Silver | Daiki Kubo | Swimming | Men's 100 m butterfly S10 | 21 October |
| Silver | Keiichi Kimura | Swimming | Men's 100 m breaststroke SB11 | 21 October |
| Silver | Kotaro Ogiwara | Swimming | Men's 100 m freestyle S8 | 21 October |
| Silver | Eigo Tanaka | Swimming | Men's 200 m freestyle S5 | 21 October |
| Silver | Ayano Tsujiuchi | Swimming | Women's 100 m backstroke S13 | 21 October |
| Silver | Tae Kawabe | Swimming | Women's 100 m butterfly S10 | 21 October |
| Silver | Mikika Serizawa | Swimming | Women's 100 m breaststroke SB14 | 21 October |
| Silver | Mai Mizukami | Swimming | Women's 50 m freestyle S8 | 21 October |
| Silver | Ema Maeda; Kotaro Ogiwara; Kanta Okajima; Kanon Fukuda | Swimming | Mixed 4 × 100 m medley relay 34 points | 21 October |
| Silver | Yoshitaka Tanaka | Cycling | Men's road race H1-3 | 22 October |
| Silver | Tomoya Ito | Athletics | Men's 400 m T51/T52 | 22 October |
| Silver | Kakeru Ishida | Athletics | Men's 400 m T47 | 22 October |
| Silver | Yui Kamiji | Wheelchair tennis | Women's singles | 22 October |
| Silver | Taiyo Kawabuchi | Swimming | Men's 100 m butterfly S9 | 22 October |
| Silver | Shunya Murakami | Swimming | Men's 100 m butterfly S14 | 22 October |
| Silver | Shinya Wada | Athletics | Men's 1500 m T11 | 22 October |
| Silver | Aira Kinoshita | Swimming | Women's 100 m butterfly S14 | 22 October |
| Silver | Ayano Tsujichi | Swimming | Women's 50 m freestyle S13 | 22 October |
| Silver | Izumi Zaima; Amane Yanagimoto; Ruri Kojima; Aoi Nishimura; Mayo Hagino; Chinami Shimizu; Haruka Ueno; Mari Amimoto; Chihiro Kitada; Yui Kitama; Nana Gunji; Meika Fujiwara | Wheelchair basketball | Women's tournament | 22 October |
| Silver | Mana Sasaki | Athletics | Women's 400 m T13 | 23 October |
| Silver | Kako Okano | Athletics | Women's 1500 m T20 | 23 October |
| Silver | Minami Arai; Saki Amuro; Ayumi Kamiya; Norika Hagiwara; Rieko Takahashi; Yui Kimura | Goalball | Women's tournament | 23 October |
| Silver | Keiko Sugiura | Cycling | Women's road race C1-3 | 23 October |
| Silver | Ryuji Kusaba; Rai Yamashiro; Atsuki Omine; Takuya Yamamoto; Hiroki Kawae; Katsuya Hashimoto; Soshi Aoki; Hiroki Hora; Kohei Suzuki; Yuna Nishimura; Yudai Akahoshi; Aren Shimazaki | Wheelchair rugby | Tournament | 23 October |
| Silver | Yuichiro Kitagawa; Kazuki Shichino | Table tennis | Men's doubles MD8 | 23 October |
| Silver | Yui Kamiji; Momoko Ohtani | Wheelchair tennis | Women's doubles | 23 October |
| Silver | Taiyo Kawabuchi | Swimming | Men's 100 m freestyle S9 | 23 October |
| Silver | Yuuki Tsuboi | Swimming | Men's 200 m individual medley SM14 | 23 October |
| Silver | Kenya Izumi; So Omoto; Kenta Hayashi; Yuki Saito; Masaki Goto; Taichi Hirabayashi; Ryo Kawamura; Hiroto Takahashi; Sodai Hongo; Masashi Kamiyama | Blind football | Men's tournament | 23 October |
| Silver | Kotaro Ogiwara; Kanon Fukuda; Kosuke Tsuboi; Ema Maeda | Swimming | Mixed 4 × 100 m freestyle relay 34 points | 23 October |
| Silver | Ryota Fukunaga | Athletics | Men's 400 m T13 | 23 October |
| Silver | Tadashi Horikoshi | Athletics | Men's 5000 m T12/T13 | 23 October |
| Silver | Natsuki Toda | Athletics | Men's 500 m T20 | 23 October |
| Bronze | Riyo Kogama | Cycling | Women's 1000 m time trial C4-5 | 19 October |
| Bronze | Tetsuya Sakurai | Judo | Men's 70 kg J2 | 19 October |
| Bronze | Yujiro Seto | Judo | Men's 70 kg J2 | 19 October |
| Bronze | Kotaro Ogiwara | Swimming | Men's 400 m freestyle S8 | 19 October |
| Bronze | Yui Fujiwara | Judo | Women's 52 kg J2 | 19 October |
| Bronze | Eigo Tanaka | Swimming | Men's 50 m freestyle S5 | 19 October |
| Bronze | Asako Kurashimo | Table tennis | Women's singles C8 | 19 October |
| Bronze | Shintaro Kano | Wheelchair fencing | Men's individual foil A | 19 October |
| Bronze | Genki Saito | Swimming | Men's 100 m freestyle S12 | 19 October |
| Bronze | Mana Sasaki | Athletics | Women's 1500 m T13 | 19 October |
| Bronze | Ema Maeda | Swimming | Women's 200 m individual medley SM9 | 19 October |
| Bronze | Taiyo Kawabuchi | Swimming | Men's 200 m individual medley SM9 | 19 October |
| Bronze | Yuma Tamaki | Athletics | Men's 200 m T64 | 19 October |
| Bronze | Ibuki Mawatari | Table tennis | Women's singles C11 | 20 October |
| Bronze | Yuichiro Kitagawa | Table tennis | Men's singles C3 | 20 October |
| Bronze | Akane Kato | Athletics | Women's 400 m T20 | 20 October |
| Bronze | Riyo Kogama | Cycling | Women's 4000 m individual pursuit C4-5 | 20 October |
| Bronze | Shuta Kawakami | Athletics | Men's 100 m T13 | 20 October |
| Bronze | Keiko Sugiura | Cycling | Women's 1000 m time trial C1-3 | 20 October |
| Bronze | Minako Tsuchiya | Judo | Women's 70 kg J1 | 20 October |
| Bronze | Shota Kawamoto | Cycling | Men's 1000 m time trial C1-3 | 20 October |
| Bronze | Shintaro Kano; Akira Tsunoda; Takaaki Sasajima; Naoki Yasu | Wheelchair fencing | Men's team foil | 20 October |
| Bronze | Junko Hirose | Judo | Women's 60 kg J2 | 20 October |
| Bronze | Kanta Kokubo | Athletics | Men's long jump T20 | 20 October |
| Bronze | Eigo Tanaka | Swimming | Men's 50 m butterfly S5 | 20 October |
| Bronze | Kotaro Ogiwara | Swimming | Men's 200 m individual medley SM8 | 20 October |
| Bronze | Yumeto Ido | Swimming | Men's 100 m backstroke S10 | 20 October |
| Bronze | Tomoya Ito | Athletics | Men's 100 m T51/T52 | 21 October |
| Bronze | Kenta Wakoh | Athletics | Men's javelin throw F12/F13 | 21 October |
| Bronze | Kazuki Takahashi | Boccia | Men's individual BC3 | 21 October |
| Bronze | Uchu Tomita | Swimming | Men's 200 m individual medley SM11 | 21 October |
| Bronze | Akari Kasamoto | Swimming | Women's 100 m backstroke S13 | 21 October |
| Bronze | Yuko Iritani | Swimming | Women's 100 m breaststroke SB14 | 21 October |
| Bronze | Ema Maeda | Swimming | Women's 400 m freestyle S9 | 21 October |
| Bronze | Mai Mizukami | Swimming | Women's 100 m freestyle S8 | 21 October |
| Bronze | Tatsuya Ito | Athletics | Men's 400 m T51/T52 | 22 October |
| Bronze | Daiki Ishiyama | Athletics | Men's long jump T12 | 22 October |
| Bronze | Daiki Kajiwara; Keita Nishimura | Badminton | Men's doubles WH1-WH2 | 22 October |
| Bronze | Taiyo Imai | Badminton | Men's singles SU5 | 22 October |
| Bronze | Kiyoharu Nakagawa; Takaaki Sasajima; Naoki Yasu | Wheelchair fencing | Men's team épée | 22 October |
| Bronze | Sena Tomoyose | Badminton | Women's singles WH1 | 22 October |
| Bronze | Koyo Iwabuchi; Yuri Tomono | Table tennis | Mixed doubles XD17 | 22 October |
| Bronze | Momoko Ohtani | Wheelchair tennis | Women's singles | 22 October |
| Bronze | Kota Kubota | Swimming | Men's 100 m backstroke S8 | 22 October |
| Bronze | Anku Matsuda | Swimming | Men's 100 m butterfly S14 | 22 October |
| Bronze | Eigo Tanaka | Swimming | Men's 200 m individual medley SM5 | 22 October |
| Bronze | Ema Maeda | Swimming | Women's 100 m butterfly S9 | 22 October |
| Bronze | Tae Kawabe | Swimming | Women's 50 m freestyle S10 | 22 October |
| Bronze | Mikuni Utsugi | Swimming | Women's 100 m breaststroke SB8 | 22 October |
| Bronze | Yuma Tamaki | Athletics | Men's long jump T44/T62/T64 | 22 October |
| Bronze | Riri Miura; Yuri Tomono | Table tennis | Women's doubles WD20 | 23 October |
| Bronze | Saki Takamuro; Manami Tanaka | Wheelchair tennis | Women's doubles | 23 October |
| Bronze | Yuna Fujiwara | Athletics | Women's 1500 m T20 | 23 October |
| Bronze | Yutaka Kumagai | Athletics | Men's 5000 m T12/T13 | 23 October |
| Bronze | Riyo Kogama | Cycling | Women's road race C4-5 | 23 October |
| Bronze | Sachie Akakura; Junko Fujii; Mizuko Fujimoto; Mika Hata; Kasumi Iihoshi; Satoko Kikuchi; Michiyo Nishiie; Hiyori Osaki; Mikiko Sumitomo; Risa Yokota; Hikari Yoshimoto | Sitting volleyball | Women's tournament | 23 October |
| Bronze | Kanon Fukuda | Swimming | Women's 100 m freestyle S9 | 23 October |
| Bronze | Ryuga Yamada | Swimming | Men's 400 m freestyle S6 | 23 October |
| Bronze | Genki Saito | Swimming | Men's 200 m individual medley SM13 | 23 October |
| Bronze | Mayu Togo | Swimming | Women's 100 m backstroke S9 | 23 October |
| Bronze | Yuki Iwata | Athletics | Men's 500 m T20 | 23 October |
| Bronze | Hajime Kondo | Athletics | Men's 100 m T63 | 23 October |

== Medal summary ==
=== Medals by sport ===
Medals by sport
| Sport | 1st place, gold medalist(s) | 2nd place, silver medalist(s) | 3rd place, bronze medalist(s) | Total |
| Swimming | 24 | 24 | 23 | 71 |
| Athletics | 19 | 18 | 14 | 51 |
| Table tennis | 6 | 4 | 5 | 15 |
| Cycling | 4 | 5 | 5 | 14 |
| Wheelchair tennis | 4 | 2 | 2 | 8 |
| Badminton | 3 | 0 | 3 | 6 |
| Judo | 1 | 2 | 5 | 8 |
| Goalball | 1 | 1 | 0 | 2 |
| Wheelchair basketball | 1 | 1 | 0 | 2 |
| Boccia | 1 | 0 | 1 | 2 |
| Blind football | 0 | 1 | 0 | 1 |
| Taekwondo | 0 | 1 | 0 | 1 |
| Wheelchair rugby | 0 | 1 | 0 | 1 |
| Wheelchair fencing | 0 | 0 | 3 | 3 |
| Sitting volleyball | 0 | 0 | 1 | 1 |
| Total | 64 | 60 | 62 | 186 |

=== Medals by day ===
Medals by day
| Day | Date | 1st place, gold medalist(s) | 2nd place, silver medalist(s) | 3rd place, bronze medalist(s) | Total |
| 1 | October 19 | 9 | 6 | 13 | 28 |
| 2 | October 20 | 7 | 14 | 14 | 35 |
| 3 | October 21 | 13 | 16 | 8 | 37 |
| 4 | October 22 | 11 | 10 | 15 | 36 |
| 5 | October 23 | 23 | 14 | 12 | 49 |
| 6 | October 24 | 1 | 0 | 0 | 1 |
| Total | | 64 | 60 | 62 | 186 |

== Competitors ==
The following is the list of number of competitors participating in the Games.

| Sport | Men | Women | Total |
|---|---|---|---|
| Archery | 5 | 2 | 7 |
| Athletics | 32 | 21 | 53 |
| Badminton | 8 | 4 | 12 |
| Blind football | 8 | —N/a | 8 |
| Boccia | 2 | 5 | 7 |
| Cycling | 7 | 2 | 9 |
| Goalball | 6 | 6 | 12 |
| Judo | 7 | 6 | 13 |
| Powerlifting | 6 | 4 | 10 |
| Shooting | 3 | 4 | 7 |
| Sitting volleyball | 10 | 11 | 19 |
| Swimming | 23 | 16 | 39 |
| Table tennis | 12 | 11 | 23 |
| Taekwondo | 4 | 2 | 6 |
| Wheelchair basketball | 12 | 12 | 24 |
| Wheelchair fencing | 5 | 5 | 10 |
| Wheelchair rugby | 11 | 1 | 12 |
| Wheelchair tennis | 6 | 4 | 10 |
| Total | 166 | 117 | 283 |

== See also ==
- Japan at the 2026 Asian Games
