= Katherine Valli =

American para badminton player

Personal information
- Born: January 16, 2003 (age 23) Pittsburgh, Pennsylvania, U.S.
- Height: 4 ft 2 in (127 cm)

Sport
- Country: United States
- Sport: Badminton
- Coached by: Pallav Deka

Women's singles and doubles SH6
- Highest ranking: 2 (WS August 29, 2019); 1 (WD with Giuliana Póveda August 29, 2019); 6 (XD with Krishna Nagar June 24, 2019)
- Current ranking: 13 (WS); 2 (WD with Giuliana Póveda); 21 (XD with Dawson McClure) (November 8, 2022)
Medal record
Para badminton
Representing United States
World Championships
Silver medal – second place	2019 Basel	Women's doubles
Bronze medal – third place	2019 Basel	Women's singles
Pan Am Championships
Gold medal – first place	2018 Lima	Women's doubles
Silver medal – second place	2018 Lima	Women's singles

Katherine Revell Valli (born January 16, 2003) is an American para-badminton player who competes in international level events. She was a double medalist at the 2019 BWF Para-Badminton World Championships in Basel.

== Achievements ==
=== World Championships ===
Women's singles

Year	Venue	Opponent	Score	Result
2019	St. Jakobshalle, Basel, Switzerland	(England) Rachel Choong	19–21, 12–21	Bronze

Women's doubles

Year	Venue	Partner	Opponent	Score	Result
2019	St. Jakobshalle, Basel, Switzerland	(Peru) Giuliana Póveda	(England) Rebecca Bedford (England) Rachel Choong	25–27, 17–21	Silver

=== Pan Am Championships ===
Women's singles

Year	Venue	Opponent	Score	Result
2018	Polideportivo 2, Lima, Peru	(Peru) Giuliana Póveda	13–21, 6–21	Silver

Women's doubles

Year	Venue	Partner	Opponent	Score	Result
2018 (Note: This tournament uses a round robin system.)	Polideportivo 2, Lima, Peru	(Peru) Giuliana Póveda	(United States) Colleen Gioffreda (United States) Jayci Simon	21–3, 21–4	Gold
2018	Polideportivo 2, Lima, Peru	(Peru) Giuliana Póveda	(Argentina) Karen Franco (Peru) Rosa Velásquez	21–3, 21–7	Gold
2018	Polideportivo 2, Lima, Peru	(Peru) Giuliana Póveda	(Peru) Rubí Fernández (Peru) Gabriela Rojas Bautista	21–6, 21–5	Gold
2018	Polideportivo 2, Lima, Peru	(Peru) Giuliana Póveda	(Chile) Damaris Nava Clarisa (Chile) Fabiola Prado	21–2, 21–2	Gold

=== International tournaments (5 titles, 7 runners-up) ===
Women's singles

Year	Tournament	Opponent	Score	Result
2017	USA Para Badminton International	(United States) Colleen Gioffreda	21–8, 21–14	(silver) Runner-up
2017	USA Para Badminton International	(Scotland) Deidre Nagle	21–12, 21–14	(silver) Runner-up
2017	USA Para Badminton International	(Peru) Giuliana Póveda	12–21, 9–21	(silver) Runner-up
2018	Brazil Para Badminton International	(Peru) Giuliana Póveda	7–21, 11–21	(silver) Runner-up
2019	Canada Para Badminton International	(Peru) Giuliana Póveda	20–22, 11–21	(silver) Runner-up
2019	Irish Para Badminton International	(Peru) Giuliana Póveda	8–21, 13–21	(silver) Runner-up
2020	Peru Para Badminton International	(Peru) Giuliana Póveda	7–21, 16–21	(silver) Runner-up

Women's doubles

Year	Tournament	Partner	Opponent	Score	Result
2019	Canada Para Badminton International	(Peru) Giuliana Póveda	(Russia) Irina Borisova (Russia) Uliana Podpalnaya	21–3, 21–11	(gold) Winner
2019	Canada Para Badminton International	(Peru) Giuliana Póveda	(Poland) Daria Bujnicka (Peru) Rubí Fernández	21–10, 21–8	(gold) Winner
2019	Canada Para Badminton International	(Peru) Giuliana Póveda	(United States) Colleen Gioffreda (United States) Jayci Simon	21–8, 21–5	(gold) Winner
2019	Irish Para Badminton International	(Peru) Giuliana Póveda	(England) Rebecca Bedford (Egypt) Yasmina Eissa	21–16, 21–7	(gold) Winner
2019	Irish Para Badminton International	(Peru) Giuliana Póveda	(Poland) Daria Bujnicka (Ukraine) Nina Kozlova	21–4, 21–12	(gold) Winner
2019	Irish Para Badminton International	(Peru) Giuliana Póveda	(Poland) Maria Bartusz (Poland) Oliwia Szmigiel	21–17, 21–9	(gold) Winner
2020	Peru Para Badminton International	(Peru) Giuliana Póveda	(United States) Colleen Gioffreda (United States) Jayci Simon	21–11, 21–9	(gold) Winner
2020	Peru Para Badminton International	(Peru) Giuliana Póveda	(Peru) Mariel María (Peru) Gabriela Rojas Bautista	21–5, 21–13	(gold) Winner
2020	Peru Para Badminton International	(Peru) Giuliana Póveda	(Peru) Rubí Fernández (Peru) Rosa Velásquez	21–13, 21–7	(gold) Winner

Doubles

Year	Tournament	Partner	Opponent	Score	Result
2018	Irish Para Badminton International	(Peru) Giuliana Póveda	(Poland) Maria Bartusz (Republic of Ireland) Emma Farnham	21–13, 21–8	(gold) Winner
2018	Irish Para Badminton International	(Peru) Giuliana Póveda	(Poland) Daria Bujnicka (Poland) Oliwia Szmigiel	21–8, 21–18	(gold) Winner
2018	Irish Para Badminton International	(Peru) Giuliana Póveda	(England) James Binnie (Netherlands) Mark Modderman	21–8, 21–14	(gold) Winner
2018	Irish Para Badminton International	(Peru) Giuliana Póveda	(Russia) Irina Borisova (Scotland) Deidre Nagle	21–9, 21–6	(gold) Winner

Mixed doubles

Year	Tournament	Partner	Opponent	Score	Result
2017	USA Para Badminton International	(United States) Miles Krajewski	(United States) Ryan Gioffreda (United States) Colleen Gioffreda	21–7, 21–14	(silver) Runner-up
2017	USA Para Badminton International	(United States) Miles Krajewski	(Peru) Jesús Salva (Peru) Giuliana Póveda	13–21, 14–21	(silver) Runner-up
2017	USA Para Badminton International	(United States) Miles Krajewski	(United States) Danh Trang (Scotland) Deidre Nagle	21–7, 21–18	(silver) Runner-up
2019	Canada Para Badminton International	(United States) Miles Krajewski	(Brazil) Vitor Tavares (Poland) Daria Bujnicka	16–21, 14–21	(silver) Runner-up
2019	Irish Para Badminton International	(India) Krishna Nagar	(Scotland) Robert Laing (England) Rebecca Bedford	21–19, 21–18	(gold) Winner
