= Jack Shephard (para-badminton) =

English para-badminton player

Personal information
- Born: 25 July 1997 (age 28) Chesterfield, England
- Height: 135 cm (4 ft 5 in)

Sport
- Country: England
- Sport: Badminton
- Handedness: Right

Men's singles and doubles SH6
- Highest ranking: 1 (MS 1 January 2019); 1 (MD with Krysten Coombs 1 January 2019); 4 (XD with Rachel Choong 8 November 2022)
- Current ranking: 2 (MS); 8 (MD with Krysten Coombs); 4 (XD with Rachel Choong) (8 November 2022)
Medal record
Para-badminton
Representing Great Britain
European Para Championships
Gold medal – first place	2023 Rotterdam	Men's singles SH6
Gold medal – first place	2023 Rotterdam	Mixed doubles SH6
Representing England
World Championships
Gold medal – first place	2015 Stoke Mandeville	Men's doubles
Gold medal – first place	2017 Ulsan	Men's singles
Gold medal – first place	2019 Basel	Men's singles
Silver medal – second place	2013 Dortmund	Mixed doubles
Silver medal – second place	2015 Stoke Mandeville	Mixed doubles
Silver medal – second place	2017 Ulsan	Men's doubles
Silver medal – second place	2022 Tokyo	Men's singles
Bronze medal – third place	2015 Stoke Mandeville	Men's singles
Bronze medal – third place	2022 Tokyo	Mixed doubles
Bronze medal – third place	2026 Manama	Men's singles
European Championships
Gold medal – first place	2018 Rodez	Men's singles
Gold medal – first place	2018 Rodez	Men's doubles
Silver medal – second place	2016 Beek	Mixed doubles
Bronze medal – third place	2014 Murcia	Men's singles
Bronze medal – third place	2014 Murcia	Men's doubles
Bronze medal – third place	2016 Beek	Men's singles

Jack Shephard (born 25 July 1997) is an English para-badminton player who plays in SS6 events for players who have short stature and achondroplasia.

== Achievements ==
=== World Championships ===
Men's singles SH6

Year	Venue	Opponent	Score	Result
2015	Stoke Mandeville Stadium, Stoke Mandeville, England	(England) Andrew Martin	13–21, 21–14, 19–21	Bronze
2017	Dongchun Gymnasium, Ulsan, South Korea	(England) Krysten Coombs	10–21, 21–19, 23–21	Gold
2019	St. Jakobshalle, Basel, Switzerland	(Hong Kong) Wong Chun Yim	21–17, 21–10	Gold
2022	Yoyogi National Gymnasium, Tokyo, Japan	(Hong Kong) Chu Man Kai	20–22, 21–13, 20–22	Silver
2026	Isa Sports City, Manama, Bahrain	(Thailand) Natthapong Meechai	15–21, 11–21	Bronze

Men's doubles SH6

Year	Venue	Partner	Opponent	Score	Result
2015	Stoke Mandeville Stadium, Stoke Mandeville, England	(England) Krysten Coombs	(England) Isaak Dalglish (England) Andrew Martin	21–11, 21–16	Gold
2017	Dongchun Gymnasium, Ulsan, South Korea	(England) Krysten Coombs	(Hong Kong) Chu Man Kai (Hong Kong) Wong Chun Yim	19–21, 21–16, 16–21	Silver

Mixed doubles SH6

Year	Venue	Partner	Opponent	Score	Result
2013	Helmut-Körnig-Halle, Dortmund, Germany	(England) Rebecca Bedford	(England) Andrew Martin (England) Rachel Choong	8–21, 17–21	Silver
2015	Stoke Mandeville Stadium, Stoke Mandeville, England	(England) Rebecca Bedford	(England) Andrew Martin (England) Rachel Choong	16–21, 4–21	Silver
2022	Yoyogi National Gymnasium, Tokyo, Japan	(England) Rachel Choong	(Indonesia) Subhan (Indonesia) Rina Marlina	8–21, 12–21	Bronze

=== European Para Championships ===
Men's singles SH6

Year	Venue	Opponent	Score	Result
2023	Rotterdam Ahoy, Rotterdam, Netherlands	(France) Charles Noakes	23–21, 17–21, 22–20	Gold

Mixed doubles SH6

Year	Venue	Partner	Opponent	Score	Result
2023	Rotterdam Ahoy, Rotterdam, Netherlands	(United Kingdom) Rachel Choong	(United Kingdom) Krysten Coombs (Poland) Oliwia Szmigiel	21–16, 21–11	Gold

=== European Championships ===
Men's singles SH6

Year	Venue	Opponent	Score	Result
2014	High Performance Center, Murcia, Spain	(England) Andrew Martin	12–21, 11–21	Bronze
2016	Sporthal de Haamen, Beek, Netherlands	(England) Krysten Coombs	21–18, 13–21, 14–21	Bronze
2018	Amphitheatre Gymnasium, Rodez, France	(England) Krysten Coombs	17–21, 21–10, 21–12	Gold

Men's doubles SH6

Year	Venue	Partner	Opponent	Score	Result
2014 (Note: This tournament uses a round robin system.)	High Performance Center, Murcia, Spain	(England) Krysten Coombs	(England) Isaak Dalglish (England) Andrew Martin	19–21, 18–21	Bronze
2014	High Performance Center, Murcia, Spain	(England) Krysten Coombs	(Poland) Grzegorz Jednaki (Scotland) Robert Laing	21–17, 21–6	Bronze
2014	High Performance Center, Murcia, Spain	(England) Krysten Coombs	(Republic of Ireland) Niall McVeigh (Russia) Alexander Mekhdiev	21–23, 21–15, 17–21	Bronze
2018	Amphitheatre Gymnasium, Rodez, France	(England) Krysten Coombs	(Republic of Ireland) Andrew Moorcroft (Scotland) Robert Laing	21–6, 21–8	Gold
2018	Amphitheatre Gymnasium, Rodez, France	(England) Krysten Coombs	(Russia) Alexander Mekhdiev (France) Fabien Morat	21–10, 21–11	Gold
2018	Amphitheatre Gymnasium, Rodez, France	(England) Krysten Coombs	(Serbia) Milan Grahovac (Serbia) Djordje Koprivica	21–3, 21–4	Gold
2018	Amphitheatre Gymnasium, Rodez, France	(England) Krysten Coombs	(England) Isaak Dalglish (England) Andrew Martin	15–21, 21–10, 21–10	Gold

Mixed doubles SH6

Year	Venue	Partner	Opponent	Score	Result
2016	Sporthal de Haamen, Beek, Netherlands	(England) Rebecca Bedford	(England) Isaak Dalglish (Poland) Maria Bartusz	21–9, 21–12	Silver
2016	Sporthal de Haamen, Beek, Netherlands	(England) Rebecca Bedford	(Scotland) Robert Laing (Scotland) Deidre Nagle	21–5, 21–10	Silver
2016	Sporthal de Haamen, Beek, Netherlands	(England) Rebecca Bedford	(Republic of Ireland) Andrew Moorcroft (Republic of Ireland) Emma Farnham	21–9, 21–9	Silver
2016	Sporthal de Haamen, Beek, Netherlands	(England) Rebecca Bedford	(England) Andrew Martin (England) Rachel Choong	13–21, 11–21	Silver

=== BWF Para Badminton World Circuit (6 titles, 5 runners-up) ===
The BWF Para Badminton World Circuit – Grade 2, Level 1, 2 and 3 tournaments has been sanctioned by the Badminton World Federation from 2022.

Men's singles SH6

Year	Tournament	Level	Opponent	Score	Result
2022	Spanish Para Badminton International I	Level 1	(India) Krishna Nagar	21–13, 21–13	(gold) Winner
2022	Bahrain Para Badminton International	Level 2	(Hong Kong) Chu Man Kai	19–21, 17–21	(silver) Runner-up
2022	Canada Para Badminton International	Level 1	(Brazil) Vitor Tavares	21–17, 21–10	(gold) Winner
2022	4 Nations Para Badminton International	Level 1	(Hong Kong) Chu Man Kai	11–21, 13–21	(silver) Runner-up
2023	Canada Para Badminton International	Level 1	(India) Krishna Nagar	18–21, 16–21	(silver) Runner-up
2024	Bahrain Para Badminton International	Level 2	(Hong Kong) Chu Man Kai	22–24, 5–21	(silver) Runner-up

Mixed doubles SH6

Year	Tournament	Level	Partner	Opponent	Score	Result
2022	Bahrain Para Badminton International	Level 2	(England) Rachel Choong	(Hong Kong) Chu Man Kai (Hong Kong) Choi Wing Kei	21–10, 21–6	(gold) Winner
2022	Thailand Para Badminton International	Level 1	(England) Rachel Choong	(Thailand) Natthapong Meechai (Thailand) Chai Saeyang	21–23, 21–11, 21–15	(gold) Winner
2023	4 Nations Para Badminton International	Level 1	(England) Rachel Choong	(Indonesia) Subhan (Indonesia) Rina Marlina	19–21, 8–21	(silver) Runner-up
2024	Spanish Para Badminton International II	Level 2	(England) Rachel Choong	(India) Sivarajan Solaimalai (India) Nithya Sre Sivan	21–14, 21–14	(gold) Winner
2024	Spanish Para Badminton International I	Level 1	(England) Rachel Choong	(Peru) Nilton Quispe (Peru) Giuliana Póveda	21–15, 16–21, 21–12	(gold) Winner

=== International tournaments (from 2011–2021) (12 titles, 4 runners-up) ===
Men's singles SH6

Year	Tournament	Opponent	Score	Result
2017	Spanish Para Badminton International	(England) Krysten Coombs	13–21, 20–22	(silver) Runner-up
2017	Irish Para Badminton International	(England) Krysten Coombs	13–21, 13–21	(silver) Runner-up
2017	Japan Para Badminton International	(England) Krysten Coombs	18–21, 23–21, 23–21	(gold) Winner
2018	Spanish Para Badminton International	(England) Krysten Coombs	21–15, 21–19	(gold) Winner
2018	Dubai Para Badminton International	(Malaysia) Didin Taresoh	21–7, 24–22	(gold) Winner
2018	Irish Para Badminton International	(England) Krysten Coombs	13–21, 21–19, 21–13	(gold) Winner
2018	Thailand Para Badminton International	(Hong Kong) Wong Chun Yim	14–21, 14–21	(silver) Runner-up
2018	Japan Para Badminton International	(England) Jack Shephard	21–11, 14–21, 21–19	(gold) Winner
2019	Canada Para Badminton International	(Hong Kong) Chu Man Kai	16–21, 21–19, 21–17	(gold) Winner
2021	Spanish Para Badminton International	(England) Jack Shephard	21–23, 21–23	(silver) Runner-up

Men's doubles SH6

Year	Tournament	Partner	Opponent	Score	Result
2015	Spanish Para Badminton International	(England) Krysten Coombs	(England) Isaak Dalglish (England) Andrew Martin	21–11, 21–9	(gold) Winner
2015	Spanish Para Badminton International	(England) Krysten Coombs	(Poland) Grzegorz Jednaki (Netherlands) Sun-jong Lie	21–8, 21–8	(gold) Winner
2015	Spanish Para Badminton International	(England) Krysten Coombs	(Scotland) Robert Laing (Hong Kong) Wong Chun Yim	21–14, 21–6	(gold) Winner
2016	Irish Para Badminton International	(England) Krysten Coombs	(England) Oliver Clarke (England) Andrew Martin	21–4, 21–19	(gold) Winner
2018	Dubai Para Badminton International	(England) Krysten Coombs	(Hong Kong) Chu Man Kai (Hong Kong) Wong Chun Yim	21–12, 21–16	(gold) Winner
2018	Irish Para Badminton International	(England) Krysten Coombs	(Hong Kong) Chu Man Kai (Hong Kong) Wong Chun Yim	21–17, 21–11	(gold) Winner
2018	Thailand Para Badminton International	(England) Krysten Coombs	(Hong Kong) Chu Man Kai (Hong Kong) Wong Chun Yim	14–21, 21–11, 21–16	(gold) Winner
2018	Japan Para Badminton International	(England) Krysten Coombs	(South Korea) An Gyeong-min (Republic of Ireland) Andrew Moorcroft	21–3, 21–7	(gold) Winner
2018	Japan Para Badminton International	(England) Krysten Coombs	(Thailand) Natthapong Meechai (Thailand) Bunthan Yaemmali	21–5, 21–11	(gold) Winner
2018	Japan Para Badminton International	(England) Krysten Coombs	(Japan) Yohei Hatakeyama (France) Fabien Morat	21–7, 21–2	(gold) Winner
