= Didin Taresoh =

Malaysian para-badminton player

Personal information
- Born: 3 June 1975 (age 51) Sabah, Malaysia

Sport
- Country: Malaysia
- Sport: Badminton
- Coached by: Rashid Sidek

Men's singles and doubles SH6
- Highest ranking: 6 (MS 2 April 2019); 11 (MD with Alexander Mekhdiev 2 April 2019); 5 (XD with Daria Bujnicka 18 February 2020)
- Current ranking: 16 (MS); 16 (XD with Daria Bujnicka) (1 November 2022)
Medal record
Para-badminton
Representing Malaysia
World Championships
Gold medal – first place	2015 Stoke Mandeville	Men's singles
Bronze medal – third place	2017 Ulsan	Men's singles
Bronze medal – third place	2019 Basel	Mixed doubles
Asian Para Games
Silver medal – second place	2018 Jakarta	Men's singles
Asian Championships
Gold medal – first place	2016 Beijing	Men's singles
ASEAN Para Games
Gold medal – first place	2017 Kuala Lumpur	Men's singles

Didin Taresoh (born 3 June 1975) is a Malaysian para-badminton player. He has a career-high ranking of 6 in the para-badminton men's singles SH6 classification.

== Career ==
He won a gold medal in the 2015 BWF Para-Badminton World Championships in the SH6 classification, which is his best achievement in his career to date. In the next two editions of the World Championships, he won two consecutive bronze medals, in both men's singles and mixed doubles respectively.

He also won gold at the 2017 ASEAN Para Games, defeating compatriot Muhammad Naim Ahmad Halmi.

He also participated in the 2018 Asian Para Games in Jakarta, Indonesia and won a silver medal.

These achievements earned him a spot in the Paralympics. He debuted in the 2020 Summer Paralympics in Tokyo, the same edition where badminton as introduced into the games. However, his run for a Paralympic medal was later cut short after failing to get past the group stage.

== Achievements ==
=== World Championships ===
Men's singles SH6

Year	Venue	Opponent	Score	Result
2015	Stoke Mandeville Stadium, Stoke Mandeville, England	(England) Andrew Martin	21–13, 21–16	Gold
2017	Dongchun Gymnasium, Ulsan, South Korea	(England) Jack Shephard	15–21, 12–21	(silver) Bronze

Mixed doubles SH6

Year	Venue	Partner	Opponent	Score	Result
2019	St. Jakobshalle, Basel, Switzerland	(Poland) Daria Bujnicka	(England) Andrew Martin (England) Rachel Choong	9–21, 13–21	(silver) Bronze

=== Asian Para Games ===
Men's singles SH6

Year	Venue	Opponent	Score	Result
2018	Istora Gelora Bung Karno, Jakarta, Indonesia	(Hong Kong) Chu Man Kai	13–21, 17–21	Silver

=== Asian Championships ===
Men's singles SH6

Year	Venue	Opponent	Score	Result
2016	China Administration of Sport for Persons with Disabilities, Beijing, China	(Hong Kong) Wong Chun Yim	21–12, 21–18	Gold

=== ASEAN Para Games ===
Men's singles SH6

Year	Venue	Opponent	Score	Result
2017	Axiata Arena, Kuala Lumpur, Malaysia	(Thailand) Bunthan Yaemmali	21–11, 21–13	Gold
2017	Axiata Arena, Kuala Lumpur, Malaysia	(Malaysia) Ridzuan Yusof	21–5, 21–1	Gold
2017	Axiata Arena, Kuala Lumpur, Malaysia	(Malaysia) Muhammad Naim Ahmad Halmi	21–1, 24–22	Gold

=== International tournaments (from 2011–2021) (1 title, 2 runners-up) ===
Men's singles SH6

Year	Tournament	Opponent	Score	Result
2016	Irish Para Badminton International	(Republic of Ireland) Niall McVeigh	21–15, 21–10	(gold) Winner
2018	Dubai Para Badminton International	(England) Jack Shephard	7–21, 22–24	(silver) Runner-up
