= Rebecca Bedford =

English para badminton player (born 1998)

Personal information
- Born: 26 May 1998 (age 28) Yoxall, England

Sport
- Country: England
- Sport: Badminton

Women's singles and doubles SH6
- Highest ranking: 3 (WS 1 January 2019); 1 (WD with Rachel Choong 1 January 2019); 2 (XD with Robert Laing 6 January 2020)
- Current ranking: 19 (WS); 6 (WD with Rachel Choong); 18 (XD with Robert Laing) (8 November 2022)
Medal record
Para badminton
Representing England
World Championships
Gold medal – first place	2015 Stoke Mandeville	Women's doubles
Gold medal – first place	2017 Ulsan	Women's doubles
Gold medal – first place	2019 Basel	Women's doubles
Silver medal – second place	2013 Dortmund	Women's singles
Silver medal – second place	2013 Dortmund	Mixed doubles
Silver medal – second place	2015 Stoke Mandeville	Women's singles
Silver medal – second place	2015 Stoke Mandeville	Mixed doubles
Silver medal – second place	2017 Ulsan	Mixed doubles
Bronze medal – third place	2017 Ulsan	Women's singles
Bronze medal – third place	2019 Basel	Women's singles
European Championships
Gold medal – first place	2018 Rodez	Women's doubles
Silver medal – second place	2016 Beek	Women's singles
Silver medal – second place	2016 Beek	Mixed doubles
Silver medal – second place	2018 Rodez	Women's singles
Bronze medal – third place	2018 Rodez	Mixed doubles

Rebecca Bedford (born 26 May 1998) is an English para-badminton player who competes in international level events and powerlifter who competes in national level events. She participates in women's doubles badminton events with Rachel Choong.

== Achievements ==
=== World Championships ===
Women's singles

Year	Venue	Opponent	Score	Result
2013 (Note: This tournament uses a round robin system.)	Helmut-Körnig-Halle, Dortmund, Germany	(England) Rachel Choong	8–21, 12–21	Silver
2013	Helmut-Körnig-Halle, Dortmund, Germany	(Germany) Milena Hoffmann	21–15, 21–7	Silver
2013	Helmut-Körnig-Halle, Dortmund, Germany	(Germany) Anna Spindelndreier	21–5, 21–6	Silver
2013	Helmut-Körnig-Halle, Dortmund, Germany	(Republic of Ireland) Emma Farnham	21–17, 21–7	Silver
2015	Stoke Mandeville Stadium, Stoke Mandeville, England	(England) Rachel Choong	13–21, 2–21	Silver
2017	Dongchun Gymnasium, Ulsan, South Korea	(Peru) Giuliana Póveda	17–21, 13–21	Bronze
2019	St. Jakobshalle, Basel, Switzerland	(Peru) Giuliana Póveda	5–21, 20–22	Bronze

Women's doubles

Year	Venue	Partner	Opponent	Score	Result
2015 (Note: This tournament uses a round robin system.)	Stoke Mandeville Stadium, Stoke Mandeville, England	(England) Rachel Choong	(Sri Lanka) Randika Doling (New Zealand) Nina Kersten	21–10, 21–6	Gold
2015	Stoke Mandeville Stadium, Stoke Mandeville, England	(England) Rachel Choong	(India) Saritha Gudeti (India) Ruhi Satish Shingade	21–5, 21–9	Gold
2015	Stoke Mandeville Stadium, Stoke Mandeville, England	(England) Rachel Choong	(Poland) Maria Bartusz (Republic of Ireland) Emma Farnham	21–7, 21–9	Gold
2017	Dongchun Gymnasium, Ulsan, South Korea	(England) Rachel Choong	(Poland) Maria Bartusz (Republic of Ireland) Emma Farnham	21–5, 21–8	Gold
2019	St. Jakobshalle, Basel, Switzerland	(England) Rachel Choong	(Peru) Giuliana Póveda (United States) Katherine Valli	27–25, 21–17	Gold

Mixed doubles

Year	Venue	Partner	Opponent	Score	Result
2013 (Note: This tournament uses a round robin system.)	Helmut-Körnig-Halle, Dortmund, Germany	(England) Jack Shephard	(England) Andrew Martin (England) Rachel Choong	11–21, 5–21	Silver
2013	Helmut-Körnig-Halle, Dortmund, Germany	(England) Jack Shephard	(England) Isaak Dalglish (Germany) Milena Hoffmann	21–8, 21–13	Silver
2013	Helmut-Körnig-Halle, Dortmund, Germany	(England) Jack Shephard	(Scotland) Robert Laing (Germany) Anna Spindelndreier	21–11, 21–10	Silver
2013	Helmut-Körnig-Halle, Dortmund, Germany	(England) Jack Shephard	(Republic of Ireland) Luke Irvine (Republic of Ireland) Emma Farnham	21–11, 21–19	Silver
2015	Stoke Mandeville Stadium, Stoke Mandeville, England	(England) Jack Shephard	(England) Andrew Martin (England) Rachel Choong	16–21, 4–21	Silver
2017	Dongchun Gymnasium, Ulsan, South Korea	(France) Fabien Morat	(England) Andrew Martin (England) Rachel Choong	9–21, 6–21	Silver
2019	St. Jakobshalle, Basel, Switzerland	(Scotland) Robert Laing	(England) Andrew Martin (England) Rachel Choong	15–21, 13–21	Bronze

=== European Championships ===
Women's singles

Year	Venue	Opponent	Score	Result
2016 (Note: This tournament uses a round robin system.)	Sporthal de Haamen, Beek, Netherlands	(Scotland) Deidre Nagle	21–4, 21–4	Silver
2016	Sporthal de Haamen, Beek, Netherlands	(Republic of Ireland) Emma Farnham	21–7, 21–5	Silver
2016	Sporthal de Haamen, Beek, Netherlands	(Poland) Maria Bartusz	21–6, 21–13	Silver
2016	Sporthal de Haamen, Beek, Netherlands	(England) Rachel Choong	10–21, 14–21	Silver
2018	Amphitheatre Gymnasium, Rodez, France	(England) Rachel Choong	10–21, 20–22	Silver

Women's doubles

Year	Venue	Partner	Opponent	Score	Result
2018 (Note: This tournament uses a round robin system.)	Amphitheatre Gymnasium, Rodez, France	(England) Rachel Choong	(Poland) Daria Bujnicka (Poland) Oliwia Szmigiel	21–6, 21–6	Gold
2018	Amphitheatre Gymnasium, Rodez, France	(England) Rachel Choong	(Poland) Maria Bartusz (Scotland) Deidre Nagle	21–2, 21–6	Gold
2018	Amphitheatre Gymnasium, Rodez, France	(England) Rachel Choong	(Russia) Irina Borisova (Denmark) Simone Meyer Larsen	21–10, 21–5	Gold

Mixed doubles

Year	Venue	Partner	Opponent	Score	Result
2016 (Note: This tournament uses a round robin system.)	Sporthal de Haamen, Beek, Netherlands	(England) Jack Shephard	(England) Isaak Dalglish (Poland) Maria Bartusz	21–9, 21–12	Silver
2016	Sporthal de Haamen, Beek, Netherlands	(England) Jack Shephard	(Scotland) Robert Laing (Scotland) Deidre Nagle	21–5, 21–10	Silver
2016	Sporthal de Haamen, Beek, Netherlands	(England) Jack Shephard	(Republic of Ireland) Andrew Moorcroft (Republic of Ireland) Emma Farnham	21–9, 21–9	Silver
2016	Sporthal de Haamen, Beek, Netherlands	(England) Jack Shephard	(England) Andrew Martin (England) Rachel Choong	13–21, 11–21	Silver
2018	Amphitheatre Gymnasium, Rodez, France	(England) Jack Shephard	(England) Andrew Martin (England) Rachel Choong	17–21, 19–21	Bronze
