= Rachel Choong =

English para badminton player

Personal information
- Nickname: Rach
- Born: 22 January 1994 (age 32) Liverpool, England
- Height: 128 cm (4 ft 2 in)
- Weight: 35 kg (77 lb)

Sport
- Country: England
- Sport: Badminton

Women's singles and doubles SH6
- Highest ranking: 2 (WS 1 January 2019); 1 (WD with Rebecca Bedford 1 January 2019); 1 (XD with Andrew Martin 1 January 2019)
- Current ranking: 3 (WS); 6 (WD with Rebecca Bedford); 4 (XD with Jack Shephard) (8 November 2022)
Medal record
Para badminton
Representing England
World Championships
Gold medal – first place	2013 Dortmund	Women's singles
Gold medal – first place	2013 Dortmund	Mixed doubles
Gold medal – first place	2015 Stoke Mandeville	Women's singles
Gold medal – first place	2015 Stoke Mandeville	Women's doubles
Gold medal – first place	2015 Stoke Mandeville	Mixed doubles
Gold medal – first place	2017 Ulsan	Women's singles
Gold medal – first place	2017 Ulsan	Women's doubles
Gold medal – first place	2017 Ulsan	Mixed doubles
Gold medal – first place	2019 Basel	Women's doubles
Gold medal – first place	2019 Basel	Mixed doubles
Silver medal – second place	2019 Basel	Women's singles
Bronze medal – third place	2022 Tokyo	Mixed doubles
European Championships
Gold medal – first place	2008 Dortmund	Women's singles
Gold medal – first place	2008 Dortmund	Mixed doubles
Gold medal – first place	2012 Dortmund	Women's singles
Gold medal – first place	2012 Dortmund	Mixed doubles
Gold medal – first place	2016 Beek	Women's singles
Gold medal – first place	2016 Beek	Mixed doubles
Gold medal – first place	2018 Rodez	Women's singles
Gold medal – first place	2018 Rodez	Women's doubles
Gold medal – first place	2018 Rodez	Mixed doubles
European Para Championships
Gold medal – first place	2023 Rotterdam	Mixed doubles
Silver medal – second place	2023 Rotterdam	Women's singles

Rachel Choong (born 22 January 1994) is an English para-badminton player who competes in international level events. She is the first English player to win three gold medals at a single world championships in 2015, she partners with Rebecca Bedford in the women's doubles and Andrew Martin in the mixed doubles at badminton competitions.

== Early life ==
Choong was born in Liverpool to Liverpool-born parents. Her paternal grandfather was a Malaysian-born Singapore-raised seaman, while her maternal grandparents were from Hong Kong and Guangzhou and ran the local Chung Wah Supermarket.

== Personal life ==
At age 25, Choong was diagnosed with 3-M syndrome.

== Achievements ==
=== World Championships ===
Women's singles

Year	Venue	Opponent	Score	Result
2013 (Note: This tournament uses a round robin system.)	Helmut-Körnig-Halle, Dortmund, Germany	(England) Rebecca Bedford	21–8, 21–12	Gold
2013	Helmut-Körnig-Halle, Dortmund, Germany	(Republic of Ireland) Emma Farnham	21–3, 21–3	Gold
2013	Helmut-Körnig-Halle, Dortmund, Germany	(Germany) Anna Spindelndreier	21–4, 21–3	Gold
2013	Helmut-Körnig-Halle, Dortmund, Germany	(Germany) Milena Hoffmann	21–7, 21–6	Gold
2015	Stoke Mandeville Stadium, Stoke Mandeville, England	(England) Rebecca Bedford	21–13, 21–2	Gold
2017	Dongchun Gymnasium, Ulsan, South Korea	(Peru) Giuliana Póveda	21–15, 21–7	Gold
2019	St. Jakobshalle, Basel, Switzerland	(Peru) Giuliana Póveda	9–21, 19–21	Silver

Women's doubles

Year	Venue	Partner	Opponent	Score	Result
2015 (Note: This tournament uses a round robin system.)	Stoke Mandeville Stadium, Stoke Mandeville, England	(England) Rebecca Bedford	(Sri Lanka) Randika Doling (New Zealand) Nina Kersten	21–10, 21–6	Gold
2015	Stoke Mandeville Stadium, Stoke Mandeville, England	(England) Rebecca Bedford	(India) Saritha Gudeti (India) Ruhi Satish Shingade	21–5, 21–9	Gold
2015	Stoke Mandeville Stadium, Stoke Mandeville, England	(England) Rebecca Bedford	(Poland) Maria Bartusz (Republic of Ireland) Emma Farnham	21–7, 21–9	Gold
2017	Dongchun Gymnasium, Ulsan, South Korea	(England) Rebecca Bedford	(Poland) Maria Bartusz (Republic of Ireland) Emma Farnham	21–5, 21–8	Gold
2019	St. Jakobshalle, Basel, Switzerland	(England) Rebecca Bedford	(Peru) Giuliana Póveda (United States) Katherine Valli	27–25, 21–17	Gold

Mixed doubles

Year	Venue	Partner	Opponent	Score	Result
2013	Helmut-Körnig-Halle, Dortmund, Germany	(England) Andrew Martin	(England) Jack Shephard (England) Rebecca Bedford	21–8, 21–17	Gold
2015	Stoke Mandeville Stadium, Stoke Mandeville, England	(England) Andrew Martin	(England) Jack Shephard (England) Rebecca Bedford	21–16, 21–4	Gold
2017	Dongchun Gymnasium, Ulsan, South Korea	(England) Andrew Martin	(France) Fabien Morat (England) Rebecca Bedford	21–9, 21–6	Gold
2019	St. Jakobshalle, Basel, Switzerland	(England) Andrew Martin	(Scotland) Robert Laing (England) Rebecca Bedford	21–15, 21–13	Gold
2022	Yoyogi National Gymnasium, Tokyo, Japan	(England) Jack Shephard	(Indonesia) Subhan (Indonesia) Rina Marlina	8–21, 12–21	Bronze

=== European Championships ===
Women's singles

Year	Venue	Opponent	Score	Result
2008	Sporthallen TSC Eintracht Dortmund, Dortmund, Germany			Gold
2012	Helmut-Körnig-Halle, Dortmund, Germany	(Germany) Milena Hoffmann	21–7, 21–6	Gold
2016 (Note: This tournament uses a round robin system.)	Sporthal de Haamen, Beek, Netherlands	(Republic of Ireland) Emma Farnham	21–6, 21–5	Gold
2016	Sporthal de Haamen, Beek, Netherlands	(Poland) Maria Bartusz	21–0, 21–14	Gold
2016	Sporthal de Haamen, Beek, Netherlands	(Scotland) Deidre Nagle	21–2, 21–2	Gold
2016	Sporthal de Haamen, Beek, Netherlands	(England) Rebecca Bedford	21–10, 21–14	Gold
2018	Amphitheatre Gymnasium, Rodez, France	(England) Rebecca Bedford	21–10, 22–20	Gold

Women's doubles

Year	Venue	Partner	Opponent	Score	Result
2018 (Note: This tournament uses a round robin system.)	Amphitheatre Gymnasium, Rodez, France	(England) Rebecca Bedford	(Poland) Daria Bujnicka (Poland) Oliwia Szmigiel	21–6, 21–6	Gold
2018	Amphitheatre Gymnasium, Rodez, France	(England) Rebecca Bedford	(Poland) Maria Bartusz (Scotland) Deidre Nagle	21–2, 21–6	Gold
2018	Amphitheatre Gymnasium, Rodez, France	(England) Rebecca Bedford	(Russia) Irina Borisova (Denmark) Simone Meyer Larsen	21–10, 21–5	Gold

Mixed doubles

Year	Venue	Partner	Opponent	Score	Result
2008	Sporthallen TSC Eintracht Dortmund, Dortmund, Germany	(England) Andrew Martin			Gold
2012	Helmut-Körnig-Halle, Dortmund, Germany	(England) Andrew Martin	(Russia) Alexander Mekhdiev (Germany) Anna Spindelndreier	21–8, 21–8	Gold
2016 (Note: This tournament uses a round robin system.)	Sporthal de Haamen, Beek, Netherlands	(England) Andrew Martin	(England) Isaak Dalglish (Poland) Maria Bartusz	21–12, 21–8	Gold
2016	Sporthal de Haamen, Beek, Netherlands	(England) Andrew Martin	(Scotland) Robert Laing (Scotland) Deidre Nagle	21–9, 21–6	Gold
2016	Sporthal de Haamen, Beek, Netherlands	(England) Andrew Martin	(Republic of Ireland) Andrew Moorcroft (Republic of Ireland) Emma Farnham	21–9, 21–6	Gold
2016	Sporthal de Haamen, Beek, Netherlands	(England) Andrew Martin	(England) Jack Shephard (England) Rebecca Bedford	21–13, 21–11	Gold
2018	Amphitheatre Gymnasium, Rodez, France	(England) Andrew Martin	(England) Isaak Dalglish (Poland) Maria Bartusz	21–15, 21–13	Gold
