= Maria Bartusz =

Polish para badminton player

Personal information
- Nickname: Maja
- Born: 28 September 1987 (age 38) Opole, Poland

Sport
- Country: Poland
- Sport: Badminton

Women's singles and doubles SH6
- Highest ranking: 5 (WS 1 January 2019); 3 (WD with Emma Farnham 1 January 2019); 9 (XD with Isaak Dalglish 1 January 2019)
- Current ranking: 23 (WS); 13 (WD with Oliwia Szmigiel); 19 (XD with Isaak Dalglish) (8 November 2022)
Medal record
Para badminton
Representing Poland
World Championships
Silver medal – second place	2017 Ulsan	Women's doubles
Bronze medal – third place	2015 Stoke Mandeville	Women's singles
Bronze medal – third place	2015 Stoke Mandeville	Women's doubles
Bronze medal – third place	2017 Ulsan	Women's singles
European Championships
Silver medal – second place	2018 Rodez	Mixed doubles
Bronze medal – third place	2016 Beek	Women's singles
Bronze medal – third place	2016 Beek	Mixed doubles
Bronze medal – third place	2018 Rodez	Women's singles

Maria Bartusz (born 28 September 1987) is a Polish para badminton player who competes in international level events.

== Achievements ==
=== World Championships ===
Women's singles

Year	Venue	Opponent	Score	Result
2015	Stoke Mandeville Stadium, Stoke Mandeville, England	(England) Rachel Choong	7–21, 2–21	Bronze
2017	Dongchun Gymnasium, Ulsan, South Korea	(England) Rachel Choong	4–21, 7–21	Bronze

Women's doubles

Year	Venue	Partner	Opponent	Score	Result
2015 (Note: This tournament uses a round robin system.)	Stoke Mandeville Stadium, Stoke Mandeville, England	(Republic of Ireland) Emma Farnham	(India) Saritha Gudeti (India) Ruhi Satish Shingade	21–12, 21–2	Bronze
2015	Stoke Mandeville Stadium, Stoke Mandeville, England	(Republic of Ireland) Emma Farnham	(Sri Lanka) Randika Doling (New Zealand) Nina Kersten	21–18, 22–24, 19–21	Bronze
2015	Stoke Mandeville Stadium, Stoke Mandeville, England	(Republic of Ireland) Emma Farnham	(England) Rebecca Bedford (England) Rachel Choong	7–21, 9–21	Bronze
2017	Dongchun Gymnasium, Ulsan, South Korea	(Republic of Ireland) Emma Farnham	(England) Rebecca Bedford (England) Rachel Choong	5–21, 8–21	Silver

=== European Championships ===
Women's singles

Year	Venue	Opponent	Score	Result
2016 (Note: This tournament uses a round robin system.)	Sporthal de Haamen, Beek, Netherlands	(Scotland) Deidre Nagle	21–11, 21–8	Bronze
2016	Sporthal de Haamen, Beek, Netherlands	(England) Rachel Choong	0–21, 14–21	Bronze
2016	Sporthal de Haamen, Beek, Netherlands	(England) Rebecca Bedford	6–21, 13–21	Bronze
2016	Sporthal de Haamen, Beek, Netherlands	(Republic of Ireland) Emma Farnham	21–12, 18–21, 21–18	Bronze
2018	Amphitheatre Gymnasium, Rodez, France	(England) Rachel Choong	6–21, 8–21	Bronze

Mixed doubles

Year	Venue	Partner	Opponent	Score	Result
2016 (Note: This tournament uses a round robin system.)	Sporthal de Haamen, Beek, Netherlands	(England) Isaak Dalglish	(England) Jack Shephard (England) Rebecca Bedford	9–21, 12–21	Bronze
2016	Sporthal de Haamen, Beek, Netherlands	(England) Isaak Dalglish	(England) Andrew Martin (England) Rachel Choong	12–21, 8–21	Bronze
2016	Sporthal de Haamen, Beek, Netherlands	(England) Isaak Dalglish	(Scotland) Robert Laing (Scotland) Deidre Nagle	21–18, 21–18	Bronze
2016	Sporthal de Haamen, Beek, Netherlands	(England) Isaak Dalglish	(Republic of Ireland) Andrew Moorcroft (Republic of Ireland) Emma Farnham	21–10, 21–15	Bronze
2018	Amphitheatre Gymnasium, Rodez, France	(England) Isaak Dalglish	(England) Andrew Martin (England) Rachel Choong	15–21, 13–21	Silver
