= Mamiko Toyoda =

Japanese para-badminton player (born 1992)

Mamiko Toyoda 豊田 まみ子
Personal information
- Born: April 11, 1992 (age 34) Fukuoka, Japan

Sport
- Country: Japan
- Sport: Badminton
- Event: Women's singles SU5; Women's doubles SL3-SU5
Medal record
Para-badminton
Representing Japan
World Championships
Gold medal – first place	2013 Dortmund	Women's singles
Silver medal – second place	2015 Stoke Mandeville	Women's singles
Silver medal – second place	2015 Stoke Mandeville	Women's doubles
Silver medal – second place	2022 Tokyo	Women's singles
Bronze medal – third place	2017 Ulsan	Women's singles
Bronze medal – third place	2017 Ulsan	Women's doubles
Asian Para Games
Bronze medal – third place	2022 Hangzhou	Women's singles
Asian Championships
Gold medal – first place	2012 Yeoju	Women's singles
Gold medal – first place	2012 Yeoju	Women's doubles

Mamiko Toyoda (豊田 まみ子, Toyoda Mamiko; born April 11, 1992) is a Japanese para-badminton player who competes in the SU5 class.

== Early life and education ==
Toyoda was born in Fukuoka, Fukuoka Prefecture, without a left elbow from birth. Influenced by her mother, she started playing badminton in the fourth grade of elementary school. After attending Seika Girls' High School, a strong badminton school, she went on to Chikushi Jogakuen University.

== Career ==
Until junior high school, Toyoda was able to compete on an equal footing with able-bodied players, but by high school she was no match for them. At the time, she was adamant about playing on an equal footing with able-bodied players, but after being persuaded by her coach, she decided to participate in a para-badminton tournament. This was the trigger for Toyoda to enter the world of para-badminton. While still a student at the university, she won the Para-Badminton World Championships held in Dortmund, Germany in November 2013, becoming the world champion. After graduating from the university, Toyoda worked for Yonex while also training in the company's badminton club. Since November 2016, badminton player Kanako Yonekura has been Toyoda's personal coach.

In September 2015, Toyoda was the defending champion at the 2015 Para-Badminton World Championships in Aylesbury, England, but had to settle for second place.

It had been decided that para-badminton would be an official event at the Tokyo Paralympics. Toyoda aims to participate and win a Paralympic medal.

== Personal life ==
Toyoda's favorite foods are curry rice, strawberry ice cream, and melon. She is a fan of Namie Amuro.
