= Daria Bujnicka =

Polish para badminton player

Personal information
- Born: 11 December 2003 (age 22) Łódź, Poland

Sport
- Country: Poland
- Sport: Badminton

Women's singles and doubles SH6
- Highest ranking: 5 (WS 28 August 2022); 1 (WD with Oliwia Szmigiel 8 November 2022); 5 (XD with Didin Taresoh 25 August 2019)
- Current ranking: 5 (WS); 1 (WD with Oliwia Szmigiel); 25 (XD with Justin Kendrick) (8 November 2022)
Medal record
Para badminton
Representing Poland
World Championships
Silver medal – second place	2022 Tokyo	Women's doubles
Bronze medal – third place	2017 Ulsan	Women's doubles
Bronze medal – third place	2019 Basel	Women's doubles
Bronze medal – third place	2019 Basel	Mixed doubles
Bronze medal – third place	2024 Pattaya	Women's doubles
Bronze medal – third place	2026 Manama	Women's doubles
European Championships
Silver medal – second place	2018 Rodez	Women's doubles
European Para Championships
Bronze medal – third place	2023 Rotterdam	Women's singles
Bronze medal – third place	2023 Rotterdam	Mixed doubles

Daria Bujnicka (born 11 December 2003) is a Polish para-badminton player who competes in international level events.

She trains alongside Oliwia Szmigiel and they compete together in doubles events, they won a bronze medal at the 2019 BWF Para-Badminton World Championships in Basel, Switzerland.

== Achievements ==
=== World Championships ===
Women's doubles

Year	Venue	Partner	Opponent	Score	Result
2017	Dongchun Gymnasium, Ulsan, South Korea	(Poland) Oliwia Szmigiel	(Poland) Maria Bartusz (Republic of Ireland) Emma Farnham	13–21, 11–21	Bronze
2019	St. Jakobshalle, Basel, Switzerland	(Poland) Oliwia Szmigiel	(England) Rebecca Bedford (England) Rachel Choong	3–21, 12–21	Bronze
2022	Yoyogi National Gymnasium, Tokyo, Japan	(Poland) Oliwia Szmigiel	(Peru) Rubí Fernández (Peru) Giuliana Póveda	13–21, 14–21	Silver
2024	Pattaya Exhibition and Convention Hall, Pattaya, Thailand	(Poland) Oliwia Szmigiel	(India) Rachana Patel (India) Nithya Sre Sivan	16–21, 17–21	Bronze

Mixed doubles

Year	Venue	Partner	Opponent	Score	Result
2019	St. Jakobshalle, Basel, Switzerland	(Malaysia) Didin Taresoh	(England) Andrew Martin (England) Rachel Choong	9–21, 13–21	Bronze

=== European Championships ===
Women's doubles

Year	Venue	Partner	Opponent	Score	Result
2018 (Note: This tournament uses a round robin system.)	Amphitheatre Gymnasium, Rodez, France	(Poland) Oliwia Szmigiel	(England) Rebecca Bedford (England) Rachel Choong	6–21, 6–21	Silver
2018	Amphitheatre Gymnasium, Rodez, France	(Poland) Oliwia Szmigiel	(Russia) Irina Borisova (Denmark) Simone Meyer Larsen	21–12, 21–13	Silver
2018	Amphitheatre Gymnasium, Rodez, France	(Poland) Oliwia Szmigiel	(Poland) Maria Bartusz (Scotland) Deidre Nagle	21–14, 18–21, 21–19	Silver
