= Kang Jung-kum =

South Korean para-badminton player (born 1967)

Personal information
- Born: 17 September 1967 (age 59) Jeju City, Jeju Province, South Korea

Sport
- Country: South Korea
- Sport: Badminton
- Handedness: Right

Women's singles WH1 Women's doubles WH1–WH2 Mixed doubles WH1–WH2
- Highest ranking: 9 (WS 22 October 2019); 4 (WD with Lee Sun-ae 1 November 2022); 4 (XD with Kim Kyung-hoon 18 May 2021)
Medal record
Women's para-badminton
Representing South Korea
World Championships
Silver medal – second place	2015 Stoke Mandeville	Women's doubles
Bronze medal – third place	2015 Stoke Mandeville	Women's singles
Bronze medal – third place	2017 Ulsan	Mixed doubles
Bronze medal – third place	2019 Basel	Mixed doubles

Kang Jung-kum (Korean: 강정금; born 17 September 1967) is a South Korean former para-badminton player. In 2021, she competed in the women's singles WH1 event at the 2020 Summer Paralympics but did not advance to the knockout stage.

== Achievements ==
=== World Championships ===
Women's singles WH1
Year	Venue	Opponent	Score	Result
2015	Stoke Mandeville Stadium, Stoke Mandeville, England	(South Korea) Son Ok-cha	18–21, 13–21	Bronze

Women's doubles WH1–WH2
Year	Venue	Partner	Opponent	Score	Result
2015	Stoke Mandeville Stadium; Stoke Mandeville, England	(South Korea) Kim Yun-sim	(Thailand) Sujirat Pookkham (Thailand) Amnouy Wetwithan	8–21, 14–21	Silver

Mixed doubles WH1–WH2
Year	Venue	Partner	Opponent	Score	Result
2017	Dongchun Gymnasium; Ulsan, South Korea	(South Korea) Kim Jung-jun	(South Korea) Lee Sam-seop (South Korea) Lee Sun-ae	21–23, 21–17, 17–21	Bronze
2019	St. Jakobshalle; Basel, Switzerland	(South Korea) Kim Kyung-hoon	(Thailand) Jakarin Homhual (Thailand) Amnouy Wetwithan	11–21, 21–19, 13–21	Bronze

=== International tournaments (2011–2021) (3 titles, 2 runners-up) ===
Women's singles WH1
Year	Tournament	Opponent	Score	Result
2017	USA Para-Badminton International	(South Korea) Son Ok-cha	21–18, 21–14	(gold) Winner

Women's doubles WH1–WH2
Year	Tournament	Partner	Opponent	Score	Result
2021	Spanish Para-Badminton International	(South Korea) Lee Sun-ae	(Thailand) Sujirat Pookkham (Thailand) Amnouy Wetwithan	12–21, 5–21	(silver) Runner-up

Mixed doubles WH1–WH2
Year	Tournament	Partner	Opponent	Score	Result
2017	USA Para-Badminton International	(South Korea) Kim Jung-jun	(Japan) Osamu Nagashima (Japan) Yuma Yamazaki	18–21, 21–8, 21–16	(gold) Winner
2019	Canada Para-Badminton International	(South Korea) Kim Kyung-hoon	(South Korea) Lee Dong-seop (South Korea) Lee Sun-ae	12–21, 16–21	(silver) Runner-up
2021	Spanish Para-Badminton International	(South Korea) Kim Kyung-hoon	(Italy) Yuri Ferrigno (Peru) Pilar Jáuregui	18–21, 21–9, 21–16	(gold) Winner
