= Nilton Quispe =

Peruvian para-badminton player

Personal information
- Full name: Nilton Aladino Quispe Ignacio
- Born: 8 May 1993 (age 33) Huaca Blanca, Chepén Province, Peru

Sport
- Country: Peru
- Sport: Para-badminton
Medal record
Para-badminton
Representing Peru
World Championships
Silver medal – second place	2022 Tokyo	Mixed doubles
Bronze medal – third place	2024 Pattaya	Men's doubles
Parapan American Games
Silver medal – second place	2023 Santiago	Mixed doubles SH6
Bronze medal – third place	2023 Santiago	Singles SH6
Pan American Championships
Gold medal – first place	2022 Cali	Mixed doubles SH6
Silver medal – second place	2022 Cali	Singles SH6
Silver medal – second place	2022 Cali	Doubles SH6

Nilton Aladino Quispe Ignacio (born 8 May 1993) is a Peruvian para-badminton player who competes in international badminton competitions. He is a World and Parapan American Games silver medalist and Pan American champion in the mixed doubles with Giuliana Póveda.

== Achievements ==
=== World Championships ===
Men's doubles

Year	Venue	Partner	Opponent	Score	Result
2024	Pattaya Exhibition and Convention Hall, Pattaya, Thailand	(Peru) Jesús Salva	(Hong Kong) Chu Man Kai (Hong Kong) Wong Chun Yim	4–21, 4–21	Bronze

Mixed doubles

Year	Venue	Partner	Opponent	Score	Result
2022	Yoyogi National Gymnasium, Tokyo, Japan	(Peru) Giuliana Póveda	(Indonesia) Subhan (Indonesia) Rina Marlina	9–21, 15–21	Silver
