= Robert Laing (badminton) =

Scottish para badminton player

Personal information
- Born: 17 September 1999 (age 26) Bathgate, Scotland

Sport
- Country: Scotland
- Sport: Badminton

Men's singles and doubles SH6
- Highest ranking: 25 (MS 1 January 2019); 8 (MD with Andrew Moorcroft 1 January 2019); 2 (XD with Rebecca Bedford 6 January 2020)
- Current ranking: 61 (MS); 30 (MD with Andrew Moorcroft); 18 (XD with Rebecca Bedford) (8 November 2022)
Medal record
Para badminton
Representing Scotland
World Championships
Silver medal – second place	2019 Basel	Mixed doubles
Bronze medal – third place	2015 Stoke Mandeville	Men's doubles
European Championships
Bronze medal – third place	2016 Beek	Doubles
Bronze medal – third place	2018 Rodez	Mixed doubles

Robert Laing (born 17 September 1999) is a Scottish para badminton player who competes in international level events. He has won two medals in the mixed doubles alongside Rebecca Bedford and he has represented Great Britain at the World Dwarf Games.

== Achievements ==
=== World Championships ===
Men's doubles

Year	Venue	Partner	Opponent	Score	Result
2015	Stoke Mandeville Stadium, Stoke Mandeville, England	(Republic of Ireland) Andrew Moorcroft	(England) Andrew Martin (England) Isaak Dalglish	7–21, 10–21	Bronze

Mixed doubles

Year	Venue	Partner	Opponent	Score	Result
2019	St. Jakobshalle, Basel, Switzerland	(England) Rebecca Bedford	(England) Andrew Martin (England) Rachel Choong	15–21, 13–21	Bronze

=== European Championships ===
Doubles

Year	Venue	Partner	Opponent	Score	Result
2016	Sporthal de Haamen, Beek, Netherlands	(England) Isaak Dalglish	(England) Krysten Coombs (England) Jack Shephard	9–21, 18–21	Bronze

Mixed doubles

Year	Venue	Partner	Opponent	Score	Result
2018	Amphitheatre Gymnasium, Rodez, France	(England) Rebecca Bedford	(England) Andrew Martin (England) Rachel Choong	17–21, 19–21	Bronze
