= Giuliana Póveda =

Peruvian para-badminton player (born 2001)

Carmen Póveda
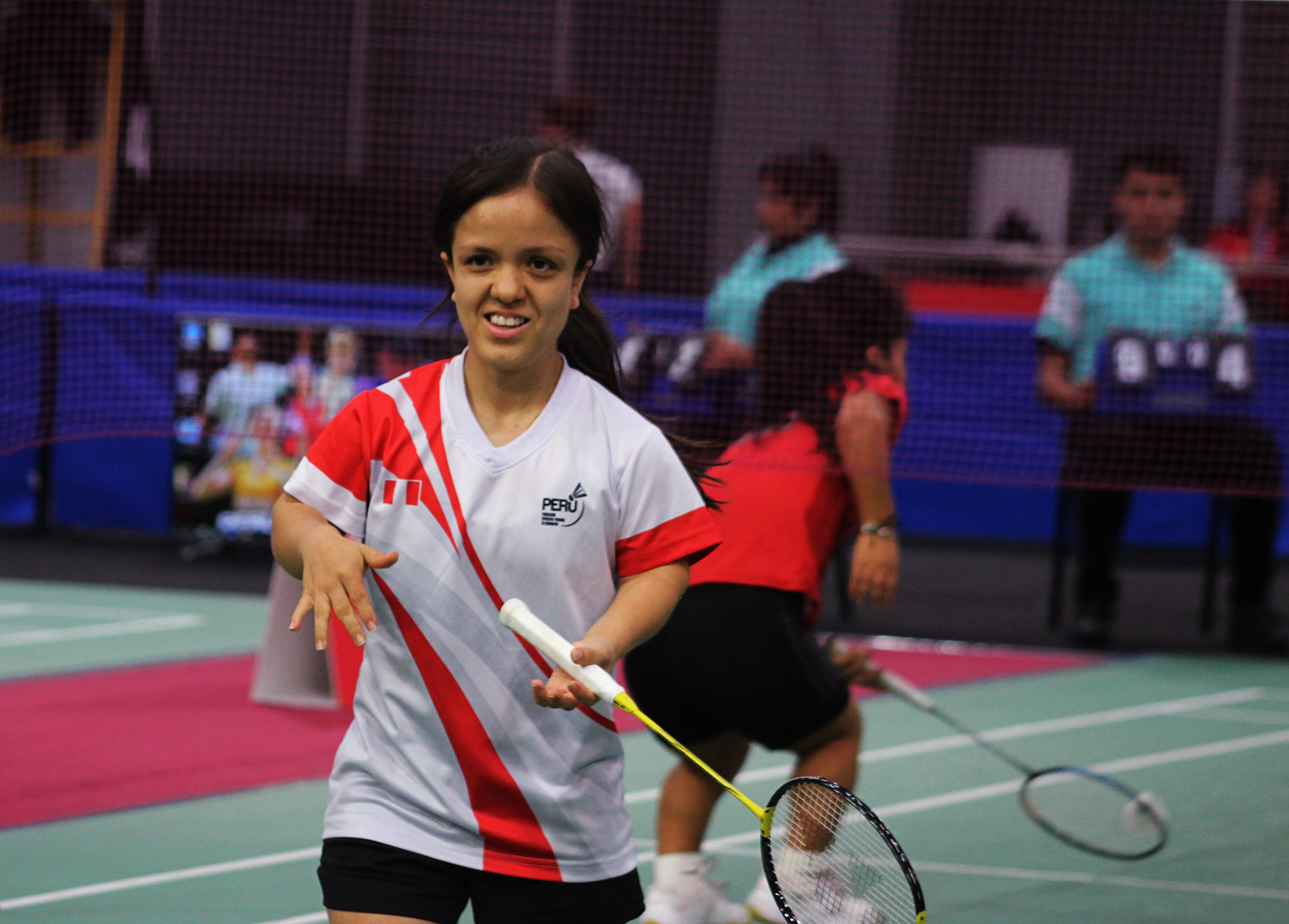
- Giuliana Póveda

Personal information
- Full name: Carmen Giuliana Póveda Flores
- Born: 27 July 2001 (age 24) Lima, Peru

Sport
- Country: Peru
- Sport: Para-badminton
- Events: Women's singles SS6; Women's doubles SH6; Mixed doubles SH6
- Coached by: Isaac Nunes
Medal record
Para-badminton
Representing Peru
World Championships
Gold medal – first place	2019 Basel	Women's singles
Gold medal – first place	2022 Tokyo	Women's doubles
Silver medal – second place	2017 Ulsan	Women's singles
Silver medal – second place	2019 Basel	Women's doubles
Silver medal – second place	2022 Tokyo	Women's singles
Silver medal – second place	2022 Tokyo	Mixed doubles
Bronze medal – third place	2017 Ulsan	Women's doubles
Bronze medal – third place	2017 Ulsan	Mixed doubles
Bronze medal – third place	2024 Pattaya	Women's singles
Bronze medal – third place	2024 Pattaya	Women's doubles
Pan American Championships
Gold medal – first place	2018 Lima	Women's singles
Gold medal – first place	2018 Lima	Women's doubles
Gold medal – first place	2022 Cali	Women's singles
Gold medal – first place	2022 Cali	Mixed doubles
Silver medal – second place	2018 Lima	Mixed doubles
Parapan American Games
Gold medal – first place	2023 Santiago	Women's singles
Silver medal – second place	2023 Santiago	Mixed doubles

Carmen Giuliana Póveda Flores (born 27 July 2001) is a Peruvian para-badminton player who competes in international badminton competitions. She is a double World champion, four-time Pan American champion and a Parapan American Games champion.

== Sporting career ==
Póveda Flores was brought up in a sporting family and introduced to sport aged six when she started playing football in a neighbourhood football club; her two sisters played football and volleyball while her father was a footballer and her mother, Lidia Flores, was an accomplished volleyball player. Carmen switched to badminton aged fourteen because of training schedule irregularities.

== Achievements ==
=== World Championships ===
Women's singles

Year	Venue	Opponent	Score	Result
2017	Dongchun Gymnasium, Ulsan, South Korea	(England) Rachel Choong	15–21, 7–21	Silver
2019	St. Jakobshalle, Basel, Switzerland	(England) Rachel Choong	21–9, 21–19	Gold
2022	Yoyogi National Gymnasium, Tokyo, Japan	(Indonesia) Rina Marlina	14–21, 14–21	Silver
2024	Pattaya Exhibition and Convention Hall, Pattaya, Thailand	(China) Lin Shuangbao	16–21, 13–21	Bronze

Women’s doubles

Year	Venue	Partner	Opponent	Score	Result
2017	Dongchun Gymnasium, Ulsan, South Korea	(Sri Lanka) Randika Doling	(England) Rebecca Bedford (England) Rachel Choong	5–21, 8–21	Bronze
2019	St. Jakobshalle, Basel, Switzerland	(United States) Katherine Valli	(England) Rebecca Bedford (England) Rachel Choong	25–27, 17–21	Silver
2022	Yoyogi National Gymnasium, Tokyo, Japan	(Peru) Rubí Fernández	(Poland) Daria Bujnicka (Poland) Oliwia Szmigiel	21–13, 21–14	Gold
2024	Pattaya Exhibition and Convention Hall, Pattaya, Thailand	(Peru) Rubí Fernández	(China) Li Fengmei (China) Lin Shuangbao	7–21, 14–21	Bronze

Mixed doubles

Year	Venue	Partner	Opponent	Score	Result
2017	Dongchun Gymnasium, Ulsan, South Korea	(Republic of Ireland) Niall McVeigh	(France) Fabien Morat (England) Rebecca Bedford	15–21, 18–21	Bronze
2022	Yoyogi National Gymnasium, Tokyo, Japan	(Peru) Nilton Quispe	(Indonesia) Subhan (Indonesia) Rina Marlina	9–21, 15–21	Silver
