= 2015 BWF Para-Badminton World Championships =

Tournament details
- Dates: 10 September - 13 September
- Edition: 10th
- Competitors: 232 from 36 nations
- Venue: Stoke Mandeville Stadium
- Location: Stoke Mandeville, England

The 2015 BWF Para-Badminton World Championships was held from 10 to 13 September 2015 in Stoke Mandeville, England.

== Participating countries ==
232 athletes from 36 countries participated in this edition of Para-Badminton World Championships.

- Australia
- Brazil
- Belgium
- China
- Denmark
- England
- Finland
- France
- Germany
- Ghana
- Guatemala
- Hong Kong
- Ireland
- India
- Israel
- Italy
- Japan
- South Korea
- Macau
- Malaysia
- Netherlands
- New Zealand
- Norway
- Peru
- Poland
- Russia
- Scotland
- Singapore
- Switzerland
- Spain
- Sri Lanka
- Sweden
- Thailand
- Turkey
- Vietnam
- Wales

== Medalists ==
=== Men's events ===
Event	Gold	Silver	Bronze
Singles WH1	(South Korea) Lee Sam-seop	(Germany) Thomas Wandschneider	(South Korea) Lee Dong-seop
Singles WH1	(South Korea) Lee Sam-seop	(Germany) Thomas Wandschneider	(Thailand) Jakarin Homhaul
Singles WH2	(South Korea) Kim Jung-jun	(South Korea) Kim Kyung-hoon	(Malaysia) Saibon Madzlan
Singles WH2	(South Korea) Kim Jung-jun	(South Korea) Kim Kyung-hoon	(Hong Kong) Chan Ho Yuen
Singles SL3	(India) Pramod Bhagat	(Vietnam) Pham Duc Trung	(England) Daniel Bethell
Singles SL3	(India) Pramod Bhagat	(Vietnam) Pham Duc Trung	(India) Manoj Sarkar
Singles SL4	(India) Tarun Dhillon	(France) Lucas Mazur	(South Korea) Kim Jae-hoon
Singles SL4	(India) Tarun Dhillon	(France) Lucas Mazur	(Malaysia) Bakri Omar
Singles SU5	(Malaysia) Cheah Liek Hou	(Poland) Bartłomiej Mróz	(India) Raj Kumar
Singles SU5	(Malaysia) Cheah Liek Hou	(Poland) Bartłomiej Mróz	(Turkey) Ilker Tuzcu
Singles SS6	(Malaysia) Didin Taresoh	(England) Andrew Martin	(England) Krysten Coombs
Singles SS6	(Malaysia) Didin Taresoh	(England) Andrew Martin	(England) Jack Shephard
Doubles WH1-WH2	(South Korea) Kim Kyung-hoon (South Korea) Lee Sam-seop	(South Korea) Kim Jung-jun (South Korea) Lee Dong-seop	(Hong Kong) Chan Ho Yuen (Japan) Osamu Nagashima
Doubles WH1-WH2	(South Korea) Kim Kyung-hoon (South Korea) Lee Sam-seop	(South Korea) Kim Jung-jun (South Korea) Lee Dong-seop	(Japan) Tsutomu Shimada (Japan) Seiji Yamami
Doubles SL3-SL4	(India) Anand Kumar Boregowda (India) Manoj Sarkar	(India) Pramod Bhagat (India) Tarun Dhillon	(England) Daniel Bethell (England) Bobby Griffin
Doubles SL3-SL4	(India) Anand Kumar Boregowda (India) Manoj Sarkar	(India) Pramod Bhagat (India) Tarun Dhillon	(Vietnam) Nguyen Van Thuong (Vietnam) Pham Duc Trung
Doubles SU5	(Malaysia) Cheah Liek Hou (Malaysia) Hairol Fozi Saaba	(Poland) Bartłomiej Mróz (Turkey) Ilker Tuzcu	(South Korea) Kim Gi-yeon (South Korea) Shin Kyung-hwan
Doubles SU5	(Malaysia) Cheah Liek Hou (Malaysia) Hairol Fozi Saaba	(Poland) Bartłomiej Mróz (Turkey) Ilker Tuzcu	(France) Colin Keranauton (Singapore) Tay Wei Ming
Doubles SS6	(England) Krysten Coombs (England) Jack Shephard	(England) Isaak Dalglish (England) Andrew Martin	(Scotland) Robert Laing (Republic of Ireland) Andrew Moorcroft
Doubles SS6	(England) Krysten Coombs (England) Jack Shephard	(England) Isaak Dalglish (England) Andrew Martin	(Thailand) Sayatorn Chatsrijurarat (Russia) Alexander Mekhdiev

=== Women's events ===
Event	Gold	Silver	Bronze
Singles WH1	(China) Wang Ping	(South Korea) Son Ok-cha	(South Korea) Kang Jung-kum
Singles WH1	(China) Wang Ping	(South Korea) Son Ok-cha	(Switzerland) Karin Suter-Erath
Singles WH2	(Thailand) Amnouy Wetwithan	(South Korea) Lee Sun-ae	(Japan) Rie Ogura
Singles WH2	(Thailand) Amnouy Wetwithan	(South Korea) Lee Sun-ae	(Turkey) Emine Seckin
Singles SL4	(Norway) Helle Sofie Sagøy	(France) Faustine Noël	(Germany) Katrin Seibert
Singles SL4	(Norway) Helle Sofie Sagøy	(France) Faustine Noël	(Vietnam) Vu Hoai Than
Singles SU5	(Denmark) Julie Thrane	(Japan) Mamiko Toyoda	(Netherlands) Megan Hollander
Singles SU5	(Denmark) Julie Thrane	(Japan) Mamiko Toyoda	(Brazil) Cintya Oliveira
Singles SS6	(England) Rachel Choong	(England) Rebecca Bedford	(Sri Lanka) Randika Doling
Singles SS6	(England) Rachel Choong	(England) Rebecca Bedford	(Poland) Maria Bartusz
Doubles WH1-WH2	(Thailand) Sujirat Pookkham (Thailand) Amnouy Wetwithan	(South Korea) Kang Jung-kum (South Korea) Kim Yun-sim	(South Korea) Lee Sun-ae (South Korea) Son Ok-cha
Doubles WH1-WH2	(Thailand) Sujirat Pookkham (Thailand) Amnouy Wetwithan	(South Korea) Kang Jung-kum (South Korea) Kim Yun-sim	(Japan) Ikumi Kubo (China) Wang Ping
Doubles SL3-SU5	(Norway) Helle Sofie Sagøy (Germany) Katrin Seibert	(India) Parul Parmar (Denmark) Julie Thrane	(Thailand) Kamtam Wandee (Japan) Mamiko Toyoda
Doubles SL3-SU5	(Norway) Helle Sofie Sagøy (Germany) Katrin Seibert	(India) Parul Parmar (Denmark) Julie Thrane	(France) Véronique Braud (France) Faustine Noël
Doubles SS6	(England) Rebecca Bedford (England) Rachel Choong	(Sri Lanka) Randika Doling (New Zealand) Nina Kersten	(Poland) Maria Bartusz (Republic of Ireland) Emma Farmham
Doubles SS6	(England) Rebecca Bedford (England) Rachel Choong	(Sri Lanka) Randika Doling (New Zealand) Nina Kersten	(India) Saritha Gudeti (India) Ruhi Satish Shingade

=== Mixed events ===
Event	Gold	Silver	Bronze
Doubles WH1-WH2	(South Korea) Lee Sam-seop (South Korea) Kim Yun-sim	(Thailand) Jakarin Homhual (Thailand) Amnouy Wetwithan	(Thailand) Junthong Dumnern (Thailand) Sujirat Pookkham
Doubles WH1-WH2	(South Korea) Lee Sam-seop (South Korea) Kim Yun-sim	(Thailand) Jakarin Homhual (Thailand) Amnouy Wetwithan	(China) Mai Jianpeng (China) Wang Ping
Doubles SL3-SU5	(India) Raj Kumar (India) Parul Parmar	(India) Rakesh Pandei (India) Manasi Girishchandra Joshi	(England) Daniel Bethell (Denmark) Julie Thrane
Doubles SL3-SU5	(India) Raj Kumar (India) Parul Parmar	(India) Rakesh Pandei (India) Manasi Girishchandra Joshi	(Germany) Peter Schnitzler (Germany) Katrin Seibert
Doubles SS6	(England) Andrew Martin (England) Rachel Choong	(England) Jack Shephard (England) Rebecca Bedford	(India) Mark Joseph Dharmai (India) Saritha Gudeti
Doubles SS6	(England) Andrew Martin (England) Rachel Choong	(England) Jack Shephard (England) Rebecca Bedford	(India) Prabhu Kanamadugu Gowdar (India) Ruhi Satish Shingade

== Medal table ==
Rank	Nation	Gold	Silver	Bronze	Total
1	South Korea	4	5	5	14
2	England	4	4	4.5	12.5
3	India	4	2.5	5	11.5
4	Malaysia	3	0	2	5
5	Thailand	2	1	3	6
6	Norway	1.5	0	0	1.5
7	Denmark	1	0.5	0.5	2
8	China	1	0	1.5	2.5
9	Germany	0.5	1	2	3.5
10	France	0	2	1.5	3.5
11	Poland	0	1.5	1.5	3
12	Japan	0	1	3.5	4.5
13	Vietnam	0	1	2	3
14	Turkey	0	0.5	2	2.5
15	Sri Lanka	0	0.5	1	1.5
16	New Zealand	0	0.5	0	0.5
17	Hong Kong	0	0	1.5	1.5
18	Brazil	0	0	1	1
18	Ireland	0	0	1	1
18	Netherlands	0	0	1	1
18	Switzerland	0	0	1	1
22	Russia	0	0	0.5	0.5
22	Scotland	0	0	0.5	0.5
22	Singapore	0	0	0.5	0.5
Totals (24 entries)		21	21	42	84
