= Badminton at the 2023 European Para Championships – Women's singles SH6 =

Badminton's women's singles SH6 at the 2023 European Para Championships
- Venue: Rotterdam Ahoy, Rotterdam
- Dates: 15 – 20 August
- Competitors: 7 from 4 nations

Medalists
gold medal	Oliwia Szmigiel	Poland
silver medal	Rachel Choong	Great Britain
bronze medal	Nina Kozlova	Ukraine
bronze medal	Daria Bujnicka	Poland

The women's singles SH6 badminton tournament at the 2023 European Para Championships was played from 15 to 20 August 2023 in Rotterdam Ahoy, Rotterdam. A total of 7 players competed at the tournament, two of whom was seeded.

== Competition schedule ==
Play took place between 15 and 20 August.

GS	Group stage	½	Semifinals	F	Final

Events	Tue 15	Wed 16	Thu 17	Fri 18	Sat 19	Sun 20
Women's singles SH6	GS	GS	GS		½	F

== Seeds ==
The following players were seeded:

1. Rachel Choong (GBR) (champion; gold medalist)
2. Oliwia Szmigiel (POL) (final; silver medalist)

== Group stage ==
=== Group A ===
Pos	Team	Pld	W	L	GF	GA	GD	PF	PA	PD	Qualification
1	Rachel Choong (GBR) [1]	2	2	0	4	0	+4	84	30	+54	Qualification to elimination stage
2	Daria Bujnicka (POL)	2	1	1	2	2	0	70	49	+21	Qualification to elimination stage
3	Anastasiia Zavalii (UKR)	2	0	2	0	4	−4	9	84	−75	

Source: Group A – standings

Date		Score		Game 1	Game 2	Game 3
15 August	Rachel Choong (United Kingdom)	2–0	(Poland) Daria Bujnicka	21–19	21–9	
16 August	Rachel Choong (United Kingdom)	2–0	(Ukraine) Anastasiia Zavalii	21–1	21–1	
17 August	Daria Bujnicka (Poland)	2–0	(Ukraine) Anastasiia Zavalii	21–3	21–4	

=== Group B ===
Pos	Team	Pld	W	L	GF	GA	GD	PF	PA	PD	Qualification
1	Oliwia Szmigiel (POL) [2]	2	2	0	4	0	+4	84	20	+64	Qualification to elimination stage
2	Nina Kozlova (UKR)	2	1	1	2	2	0	57	49	+8	Qualification to elimination stage
3	Elisa Bujnowskyj (FRA)	2	0	2	0	4	−4	12	84	−72	
4	Anya Butterworth (GBR) (Z)	0	0	0	0	0	0	0	0	0	

Source: Group A – standings
(Z) Retired on second match.

Date		Score		Game 1	Game 2	Game 3
15 August	Oliwia Szmigiel (Poland)	~~2–0~~	(United Kingdom) Anya Butterworth	~~21–7~~	~~21–10~~	
15 August	Elisa Bujnowskyj (France)	0–2	(Ukraine) Nina Kozlova	3–21	4–21	
16 August	Oliwia Szmigiel (Poland)	2–0	(France) Elisa Bujnowskyj	21–3	21–2	
16 August	Anya Butterworth (United Kingdom)	Retired	(Ukraine) Nina Kozlova	~~21–11~~	~~18–21~~	13^{r}–14
17 August	Anya Butterworth (United Kingdom)	Walkover	(France) Elisa Bujnowskyj	—		
17 August	Oliwia Szmigiel (Poland)	2–0	(Ukraine) Nina Kozlova	21–5	21–10	

== Elimination stage ==
Semi-finals
1	Rachel Choong (GBR)	21	21
Nina Kozlova (UKR)	9	11
Daria Bujnicka (POL)	6	12
2	Oliwia Szmigiel (POL)	21	21

Final
1	Rachel Choong (GBR)	21	15	18
2	Oliwia Szmigiel (POL)	11	21	21
