= 2019 BWF Para-Badminton World Championships =

Tournament details
- Dates: 20 August - 25 August
- Edition: 12th
- Competitors: 315
- Venue: St. Jakobshalle
- Location: Basel, Switzerland

The 2019 BWF Para-Badminton World Championships was held from 20 to 25 August 2019 in Basel, Switzerland.

== Host city selection ==
After Basel was selected to be the host of 2019 BWF World Championships in March 2019, the organizing team proposed to hold the able-bodied badminton world championships together the para-badminton world championships. The proposal was approved by Badminton World Federation thus marking the first time Para-Badminton World Championships is held together with World Badminton Championships in the same venue.

== Participating countries ==
313 players from 49 countries took part.

- Australia (5)
- Austria (1)
- Belgium (1)
- Brazil (13)
- Canada (10)
- China (20)
- Chinese Taipei (4)
- Colombia (1)
- Democratic Republic of the Congo (1)
- Denmark (1)
- Ecuador (1)
- Egypt (8)
- England (12)
- Faroe Islands (1)
- Finland (7)
- France (19)
- Germany (10)
- Greece (1)
- Hong Kong (3)
- India (26)
- Indonesia (9)
- Ireland (3)
- Israel (2)
- Italy (4)
- Japan (25)
- Kenya (8)
- Malaysia (6)
- Netherlands (4)
- New Zealand (1)
- Nigeria (7)
- Norway (1)
- Peru (3)
- Poland (7)
- Portugal (2)
- Russia (16)
- Scotland (4)
- Singapore (1)
- South Africa (1)
- South Korea (10)
- Spain (4)
- Sweden (1)
- Switzerland (5) Host country
- Thailand (16)
- Turkey (7)
- Uganda (4)
- Ukraine (5)
- United States (9)
- Vietnam (4)
- Wales (1)

== Medalists ==
=== Men's events ===
| Event | Gold | Silver | Bronze |
|---|---|---|---|
| Singles WH1 | (China) Qu Zimo | (South Korea) Lee Dong-seop | (China) Yang Tong |
| Singles WH1 | (China) Qu Zimo | (South Korea) Lee Dong-seop | (South Korea) Choi Jung-man |
| Singles WH2 | (South Korea) Kim Jung-jun | (Hong Kong) Chan Ho Yuen | (Japan) Atsuya Watanabe |
| Singles WH2 | (South Korea) Kim Jung-jun | (Hong Kong) Chan Ho Yuen | (South Korea) Kim Kyung-hoon |
| Singles SL3 | (India) Pramod Bhagat | (England) Daniel Bethell | (Indonesia) Ukun Rukaendi |
| Singles SL3 | (India) Pramod Bhagat | (England) Daniel Bethell | (India) Manoj Sarkar |
| Singles SL4 | (France) Lucas Mazur | (India) Tarun Dhillon | (Indonesia) Fredy Setiawan |
| Singles SL4 | (France) Lucas Mazur | (India) Tarun Dhillon | (India) Sukant Kadam |
| Singles SU5 | (Indonesia) Dheva Anrimusthi | (Indonesia) Suryo Nugroho | (Malaysia) Cheah Liek Hou |
| Singles SU5 | (Indonesia) Dheva Anrimusthi | (Indonesia) Suryo Nugroho | (Poland) Bartłomiej Mróz |
| Singles SS6 | (England) Jack Shephard | (Hong Kong) Wong Chun Yim | (Brazil) Vitor Tavares |
| Singles SS6 | (England) Jack Shephard | (Hong Kong) Wong Chun Yim | (India) Krishna Nagar |
| Doubles WH1–WH2 | (China) Mai Jianpeng (China) Qu Zimo | (South Korea) Kim Jung-jun (South Korea) Lee Dong-seop | (Japan) Osamu Nagashima (Japan) Atsuya Watanaber |
| Doubles WH1–WH2 | (China) Mai Jianpeng (China) Qu Zimo | (South Korea) Kim Jung-jun (South Korea) Lee Dong-seop | (South Korea) Choi Jung-man (South Korea) Kim Kyung-hoon |
| Doubles SL3–SL4 | (India) Pramod Bhagat (India) Manoj Sarkar | (India) Kumar Nitesh (India) Tarun Dhillon | (Indonesia) Ukun Rukaendi (Indonesia) Hary Susanto |
| Doubles SL3–SL4 | (India) Pramod Bhagat (India) Manoj Sarkar | (India) Kumar Nitesh (India) Tarun Dhillon | (Thailand) Chawarat Kitichokwattana (India) Umesh Vikram Kumar |
| Doubles SU5 | (Indonesia) Dheva Anrimusthi (Indonesia) Hafizh Briliansyah Prawiranegara | (China) Shi Shengzhuo (China) He Zhirui | (India) Raj Kumar (India) Rakesh Pandey |
| Doubles SU5 | (Indonesia) Dheva Anrimusthi (Indonesia) Hafizh Briliansyah Prawiranegara | (China) Shi Shengzhuo (China) He Zhirui | (Malaysia) Cheah Liek Hou (Malaysia) Mohamad Faris Ahmad Azri |
| Doubles SS6 | (Hong Kong) Chu Man Kai (Hong Kong) Wong Chun Yim | (India) Krishna Nagar (India) Raja Magotra | (Brazil) Vitor Tavares (United States) Miles Krajewski |
| Doubles SS6 | (Hong Kong) Chu Man Kai (Hong Kong) Wong Chun Yim | (India) Krishna Nagar (India) Raja Magotra | (England) Andrew Martin (France) Fabien Morat |

=== Women's events ===
| Event | Gold | Silver | Bronze |
|---|---|---|---|
| Singles WH1 | (Japan) Sarina Satomi | (Thailand) Sujirat Pookkham | (Switzerland) Karin Suter-Erath |
| Singles WH1 | (Japan) Sarina Satomi | (Thailand) Sujirat Pookkham | (China) Yin Menglu |
| Singles WH2 | (China) Liu Yutong | (China) Li Hongyan | (China) Xu Tingting |
| Singles WH2 | (China) Liu Yutong | (China) Li Hongyan | (Japan) Rie Ogura |
| Singles SL3 | (India) Manasi Joshi | (India) Parul Parmar | (Thailand) Wannaphatdee Kamtam |
| Singles SL3 | (India) Manasi Joshi | (India) Parul Parmar | (Turkey) Halime Yıldız |
| Singles SL4 | (Indonesia) Leani Ratri Oktila | (China) Cheng Hefang | (Norway) Helle Sofie Sagøy |
| Singles SL4 | (Indonesia) Leani Ratri Oktila | (China) Cheng Hefang | (Indonesia) Khalimatus Sadiyah |
| Singles SU5 | (China) Yang Qiuxia | (Japan) Ayako Suzuki | (Denmark) Cathrine Rosengren |
| Singles SU5 | (China) Yang Qiuxia | (Japan) Ayako Suzuki | (Japan) Kaede Kamayama |
| Singles SS6 | (Peru) Giuliana Póveda | (England) Rachel Choong | (England) Rebecca Bedford |
| Singles SS6 | (Peru) Giuliana Póveda | (England) Rachel Choong | (United States) Katherine Valli |
| Doubles WH1–WH2 | (China) Liu Yutong (China) Yin Menglu | (Thailand) Sujirat Pookkham (Thailand) Amnouy Wetwithan | (Japan) Ikumi Fuke (Japan) Rie Ogura |
| Doubles WH1–WH2 | (China) Liu Yutong (China) Yin Menglu | (Thailand) Sujirat Pookkham (Thailand) Amnouy Wetwithan | (Japan) Sarina Satomi (Japan) Yuma Yamazaki |
| Doubles SL3–SU5 | (China) Cheng Hefang (China) Ma Huihui | (Indonesia) Leani Ratri Oktila (Indonesia) Khalimatus Sadiyah | (Japan) Noriko Ito (Japan) Ayako Suzuki |
| Doubles SL3–SU5 | (China) Cheng Hefang (China) Ma Huihui | (Indonesia) Leani Ratri Oktila (Indonesia) Khalimatus Sadiyah | (Japan) Kaede Kamayama (Japan) Asami Yamada |
| Doubles SS6 | (England) Rebecca Bedford (England) Rachel Choong | (Peru) Giuliana Póveda (United States) Katherine Valli | (Poland) Daria Bujnicka (Poland) Oliwia Szmigiel |
| Doubles SS6 | (England) Rebecca Bedford (England) Rachel Choong | (Peru) Giuliana Póveda (United States) Katherine Valli | (Russia) Irina Borisova (Russia) Uliana Podpalnaya |

=== Mixed events ===
| Event | Gold | Silver | Bronze |
|---|---|---|---|
| Doubles WH1–WH2 | (China) Yang Tong (China) Li Hongyan | (Thailand) Jakarin Homhual (Thailand) Amnouy Wetwithan | (Germany) Mi Young-chin (Germany) Valeska Knoblauch |
| Doubles WH1–WH2 | (China) Yang Tong (China) Li Hongyan | (Thailand) Jakarin Homhual (Thailand) Amnouy Wetwithan | (South Korea) Kim Kyung-hoon (South Korea) Kang Jung-kum |
| Doubles SL3–SU5 | (Indonesia) Hary Susanto (Indonesia) Leani Ratri Oktila | (Germany) Jan-Niklas Pott (Germany) Katrin Seibert | (Japan) Toshiaki Suenaga (Japan) Akiko Sugino |
| Doubles SL3–SU5 | (Indonesia) Hary Susanto (Indonesia) Leani Ratri Oktila | (Germany) Jan-Niklas Pott (Germany) Katrin Seibert | (Thailand) Siripong Teammarom (Thailand) Nipada Saensupa |
| Doubles SS6 | (England) Andrew Martin (England) Rachel Choong | (Scotland) Robert Laing (England) Rebecca Bedford | (Brazil) Vitor Tavares (Peru) Rubí Fernández |
| Doubles SS6 | (England) Andrew Martin (England) Rachel Choong | (Scotland) Robert Laing (England) Rebecca Bedford | (Malaysia) Didin Taresoh (Poland) Daria Bujnicka |

== Medal table ==
| Rank | Nation | Gold | Silver | Bronze | Total |
|---|---|---|---|---|---|
| 1 | China | 7 | 3 | 3 | 13 |
| 2 | Indonesia | 4 | 2 | 4 | 10 |
| 3 | India | 3 | 4 | 4.5 | 11.5 |
| 4 | England | 3 | 2.5 | 1.5 | 7 |
| 5 | South Korea | 1 | 2 | 4 | 7 |
| 6 | Hong Kong | 1 | 2 | 0 | 3 |
| 7 | Japan | 1 | 1 | 9 | 11 |
| 8 | Peru | 1 | 0.5 | 0.5 | 2 |
| 9 | France | 1 | 0 | 0.5 | 1.5 |
| 10 | Thailand | 0 | 3 | 2.5 | 5.5 |
| 11 | Germany | 0 | 1 | 1 | 2 |
| 12 | United States | 0 | 0.5 | 1.5 | 2 |
| 13 | Scotland | 0 | 0.5 | 0 | 0.5 |
| 14 | Malaysia | 0 | 0 | 2.5 | 2.5 |
| 14 | Poland | 0 | 0 | 2.5 | 2.5 |
| 16 | Brazil | 0 | 0 | 2 | 2 |
| 17 | Denmark | 0 | 0 | 1 | 1 |
| 17 | Norway | 0 | 0 | 1 | 1 |
| 17 | Russia | 0 | 0 | 1 | 1 |
| 17 | Switzerland* | 0 | 0 | 1 | 1 |
| 17 | Turkey | 0 | 0 | 1 | 1 |
| Totals (21 entries) | | 22 | 22 | 44 | 88 |

== See also ==
- 2019 BWF World Championships
