= Oliwia Szmigiel =

Polish para-badminton player (born 2003)

Personal information
- Nickname: Mała
- Born: 9 April 2003 (age 23) Łódź, Poland
- Height: 128 cm (4 ft 2 in)
- Weight: 44 kg (97 lb)

Sport
- Country: Poland
- Sport: Badminton
- Coached by: Mateusz Szydłowski

Women's singles and doubles SH6
- Highest ranking: 3 (WS 6 March 2022); 1 (WD with Daria Bujnicka 8 November 2022); 5 (XD with Vitor Tavares 26 June 2019)
- Current ranking: 4 (WS); 1 (WD with Daria Bujnicka); 13 (XD with Fabien Morat) (8 November 2022)
- BWF profile
Medal record
Para badminton
Representing Poland
World Championships
Silver medal – second place	2022 Tokyo	Women's doubles
Bronze medal – third place	2017 Ulsan	Women's doubles
Bronze medal – third place	2019 Basel	Women's doubles
Bronze medal – third place	2022 Tokyo	Women's singles
Bronze medal – third place	2024 Pattaya	Women's doubles
Bronze medal – third place	2026 Manama	Women's doubles
European Championships
Silver medal – second place	2018 Rodez	Women's doubles
Bronze medal – third place	2018 Rodez	Women's singles
Bronze medal – third place	2018 Rodez	Mixed doubles
European Para Championships
Gold medal – first place	2023 Rotterdam	Women's singles
Silver medal – second place	2023 Rotterdam	Mixed doubles

Oliwia Szmigiel (born 4 April 2003) is a Polish para-badminton player who competes in international level events. She trains under the guidance of coach Mateusz Szydłowski in Wrocław.

== Achievements ==
=== World Championships ===
Women's singles

Year	Venue	Opponent	Score	Result
2022	Yoyogi National Gymnasium, Tokyo, Japan	(Peru) Giuliana Póveda	15–21, 7–21	Bronze

Women's doubles

Year	Venue	Partner	Opponent	Score	Result
2017	Dongchun Gymnasium, Ulsan, South Korea	(Poland) Daria Bujnicka	(Poland) Maria Bartusz (Republic of Ireland) Emma Farnham	13–21, 11–21	Bronze
2019	St. Jakobshalle, Basel, Switzerland	(Poland) Daria Bujnicka	(England) Rebecca Bedford (England) Rachel Choong	3–21, 12–21	Bronze
2022	Yoyogi National Gymnasium, Tokyo, Japan	(Poland) Daria Bujnicka	(Peru) Rubí Fernández (Peru) Giuliana Póveda	13–21, 14–21	Silver
2024	Pattaya Exhibition and Convention Hall, Pattaya, Thailand	(Poland) Daria Bujnicka	(India) Rachana Patel (India) Nithya Sre Sivan	16–21, 17–21	Bronze

=== European Championships ===
Women's singles

Year	Venue	Opponent	Score	Result
2018	Amphitheatre Gymnasium, Rodez, France	(England) Rebecca Bedford	15–21, 17–21	Bronze

Women's doubles

Year	Venue	Partner	Opponent	Score	Result
2018 (Note: This tournament uses a round robin system.)	Amphitheatre Gymnasium, Rodez, France	(Poland) Daria Bujnicka	(England) Rebecca Bedford (England) Rachel Choong	6–21, 6–21	Silver
2018	Amphitheatre Gymnasium, Rodez, France	(Poland) Daria Bujnicka	(Russia) Irina Borisova (Denmark) Simone Meyer Larsen	21–12, 21–13	Silver
2018	Amphitheatre Gymnasium, Rodez, France	(Poland) Daria Bujnicka	(Poland) Maria Bartusz (Scotland) Deidre Nagle	21–14, 18–21, 21–19	Silver

Mixed doubles

Year	Venue	Partner	Opponent	Score	Result
2018	Amphitheatre Gymnasium, Rodez, France	(Serbia) Đorđe Koprivica	(England) Isaak Dalglish (Poland) Maria Bartusz	18–21, 9–21	Bronze
