= 2022 BWF Para-Badminton World Championships =

Tournament details
- Dates: November 1–6, 2022
- Edition: 13th
- Venue: Yoyogi National Gymnasium
- Location: Tokyo, Japan

The 2022 BWF Para-Badminton World Championships (officially known as the Hulic Daihatsu BWF Para Badminton World Championships 2022 for sponsorship reasons) was held from November 1 to 6, 2022. It was previously due to be held from October 25 to 31, 2021 in Tokyo, Japan. On September 9, however, BWF announced that the tournament was postponed.

== Medalists ==
=== Men's events ===
Event	Gold	Silver	Bronze
Singles WH1	(South Korea) Choi Jung-man	(South Korea) Jeong Jae-gun	(Malaysia) Muhammad Ikhwan Ramli
Singles WH1	(South Korea) Choi Jung-man	(South Korea) Jeong Jae-gun	(Japan) Keita Nishimura
Singles WH2	(Japan) Daiki Kajiwara	(South Korea) Kim Jung-jun	(Germany) Rick Hellmann
Singles WH2	(Japan) Daiki Kajiwara	(South Korea) Kim Jung-jun	(Hong Kong) Chan Ho Yuen
Singles SL3	(India) Pramod Bhagat	(India) Kumar Nitesh	(Japan) Daisuke Fujihara
Singles SL3	(India) Pramod Bhagat	(India) Kumar Nitesh	(India) Manoj Sarkar
Singles SL4	(France) Lucas Mazur	(Indonesia) Fredy Setiawan	(Indonesia) Hikmat Ramdani
Singles SL4	(France) Lucas Mazur	(Indonesia) Fredy Setiawan	(India) Sukant Kadam
Singles SU5	(Malaysia) Cheah Liek Hou	(Indonesia) Dheva Anrimusthi	(Indonesia) Suryo Nugroho
Singles SU5	(Malaysia) Cheah Liek Hou	(Indonesia) Dheva Anrimusthi	(Japan) Taiyo Imai
Singles SH6	(Hong Kong) Chu Man Kai	(England) Jack Shephard	(Brazil) Vitor Tavares
Singles SH6	(Hong Kong) Chu Man Kai	(England) Jack Shephard	(England) Krysten Coombs
Doubles WH1–WH2	(Germany) Rick Hellmann (Germany) Thomas Wandschneider	(Malaysia) Noor Azwan Noorlan (Malaysia) Muhammad Ikhwan Ramli	(France) Thomas Jakobs (France) David Toupe
Doubles WH1–WH2	(Germany) Rick Hellmann (Germany) Thomas Wandschneider	(Malaysia) Noor Azwan Noorlan (Malaysia) Muhammad Ikhwan Ramli	(South Korea) Jeong Jae-gun (South Korea) Yu Soo-young
Doubles SL3–SL4	(Indonesia) Hikmat Ramdani (Indonesia) Ukun Rukaendi	(India) Pramod Bhagat (India) Manoj Sarkar	(France) Guillaume Gailly (France) Mathieu Thomas
Doubles SL3–SL4	(Indonesia) Hikmat Ramdani (Indonesia) Ukun Rukaendi	(India) Pramod Bhagat (India) Manoj Sarkar	(South Korea) Joo Dong-jae (South Korea) Shin Kyung-hwan
Doubles SU5	(Indonesia) Dheva Anrimusthi (Indonesia) Hafizh Briliansyah Prawiranegara	(Malaysia) Cheah Liek Hou (Malaysia) Mohamad Faris Ahmad Azri	(India) Chirag Baretha (India) Raj Kumar
Doubles SU5	(Indonesia) Dheva Anrimusthi (Indonesia) Hafizh Briliansyah Prawiranegara	(Malaysia) Cheah Liek Hou (Malaysia) Mohamad Faris Ahmad Azri	(India) Hardik Makkar (India) Ruthick Ragupathi
Doubles SH6	(South Korea) Lee Dae-sung (Thailand) Natthapong Meechai	(United States) Miles Krajewski (Brazil) Vitor Tavares	(Hong Kong) Chu Man Kai (Hong Kong) Wong Chun Yim
Doubles SH6	(South Korea) Lee Dae-sung (Thailand) Natthapong Meechai	(United States) Miles Krajewski (Brazil) Vitor Tavares	(France) Fabien Morat (France) Charles Noakes

=== Women's events ===
Event	Gold	Silver	Bronze
Singles WH1	(Japan) Sarina Satomi	(Switzerland) Cynthia Mathez	(South Korea) Kwon Hyun-ah
Singles WH1	(Japan) Sarina Satomi	(Switzerland) Cynthia Mathez	(Austria) Henriett Koósz
Singles WH2	(Peru) Pilar Jáuregui	(Turkey) Emine Seçkin	(Switzerland) Ilaria Renggli
Singles WH2	(Peru) Pilar Jáuregui	(Turkey) Emine Seçkin	(Japan) Yuma Yamazaki
Singles SL3	(Ukraine) Oksana Kozyna	(Turkey) Halime Yıldız	(India) Manasi Joshi
Singles SL3	(Ukraine) Oksana Kozyna	(Turkey) Halime Yıldız	(India) Parul Parmar
Singles SL4	(Norway) Helle Sofie Sagøy	(Japan) Haruka Fujino	(Indonesia) Khalimatus Sadiyah
Singles SL4	(Norway) Helle Sofie Sagøy	(Japan) Haruka Fujino	(France) Faustine Noël
Singles SU5	(India) Manisha Ramadass	(Japan) Mamiko Toyoda	(Denmark) Cathrine Rosengren
Singles SU5	(India) Manisha Ramadass	(Japan) Mamiko Toyoda	(Japan) Kaede Kameyama
Singles SH6	(Indonesia) Rina Marlina	(Peru) Giuliana Póveda	(Poland) Oliwia Szmigiel
Singles SH6	(Indonesia) Rina Marlina	(Peru) Giuliana Póveda	(India) Nithya Sre Sivan
Doubles WH1–WH2	(Japan) Sarina Satomi (Japan) Yuma Yamazaki	(Turkey) Emine Seçkin (Belgium) Man-Kei To	(South Korea) Jung Gyeo-ul (South Korea) Kwon Hyun-ah
Doubles WH1–WH2	(Japan) Sarina Satomi (Japan) Yuma Yamazaki	(Turkey) Emine Seçkin (Belgium) Man-Kei To	(Switzerland) Cynthia Mathez (Switzerland) Ilaria Renggli
Doubles SL3–SU5	(Indonesia) Leani Ratri Oktila (Indonesia) Khalimatus Sadiyah	(France) Lénaïg Morin (France) Faustine Noël	(India) Mandeep Kaur (India) Manisha Ramadass
Doubles SL3–SU5	(Indonesia) Leani Ratri Oktila (Indonesia) Khalimatus Sadiyah	(France) Lénaïg Morin (France) Faustine Noël	(Thailand) Nipada Saensupa (Thailand) Chanida Srinavakul
Doubles SH6	(Peru) Rubí Fernández (Peru) Giuliana Póveda	(Poland) Daria Bujnicka (Poland) Oliwia Szmigiel	(Thailand) Chai Saeyang (India) Latatai Parmeshwar Umrekar
Doubles SH6	(Peru) Rubí Fernández (Peru) Giuliana Póveda	(Poland) Daria Bujnicka (Poland) Oliwia Szmigiel	(India) Rachana Patel (India) Nithya Sre Sivan

=== Mixed events ===
Event	Gold	Silver	Bronze
Doubles WH1–WH2	(South Korea) Choi Jung-man (South Korea) Lee Sun-ae	(Italy) Yuri Ferrigno (Peru) Pilar Jáuregui	(Spain) Ignacio Fernández (Austria) Henriett Koósz
Doubles WH1–WH2	(South Korea) Choi Jung-man (South Korea) Lee Sun-ae	(Italy) Yuri Ferrigno (Peru) Pilar Jáuregui	(South Korea) Yu Soo-young (South Korea) Kwon Hyun-ah
Doubles SL3–SU5	(Indonesia) Fredy Setiawan (Indonesia) Khalimatus Sadiyah	(Thailand) Siripong Teamarrom (Thailand) Nipada Saensupa	(India) Ruthick Ragupathi (India) Manasi Joshi
Doubles SL3–SU5	(Indonesia) Fredy Setiawan (Indonesia) Khalimatus Sadiyah	(Thailand) Siripong Teamarrom (Thailand) Nipada Saensupa	(France) Lucas Mazur (France) Faustine Noël
Doubles SH6	(Indonesia) Subhan (Indonesia) Rina Marlina	(Peru) Nilton Quispe (Peru) Giuliana Póveda	(India) Krishna Nagar (India) Nithya Sre Sivan
Doubles SH6	(Indonesia) Subhan (Indonesia) Rina Marlina	(Peru) Nilton Quispe (Peru) Giuliana Póveda	(England) Jack Shephard (England) Rachel Choong

== Medal table ==
Rank	Nation	Gold	Silver	Bronze	Total
1	Indonesia	6	2	3	11
2	Japan*	3	2	5	10
3	South Korea	2.5	2	5	9.5
4	Peru	2	2.5	0	4.5
5	India	2	2	11.5	15.5
6	Malaysia	1	2	1	4
7	France	1	1	5	7
8	Hong Kong	1	0	2	3
9	Germany	1	0	1	2
10	Norway	1	0	0	1
10	Ukraine	1	0	0	1
12	Thailand	0.5	1	1.5	3
13	Turkey	0	2.5	0	2.5
14	England	0	1	2	3
14	Switzerland	0	1	2	3
16	Poland	0	1	1	2
17	Brazil	0	0.5	1	1.5
18	Belgium	0	0.5	0	0.5
18	Italy	0	0.5	0	0.5
18	United States	0	0.5	0	0.5
21	Austria	0	0	1.5	1.5
22	Denmark	0	0	1	1
23	Spain	0	0	0.5	0.5
Totals (23 entries)		22	22	44	88

== Men's events ==
=== Men's singles WH1 ===
First Round
1	(Malaysia) Muhammad Ikhwan Ramli	21	21
(Russia) Konstantin Afinogenov	13	6
5/8	(Japan) Osamu Nagashima	21	21
(Malaysia) Chew Jit Thye	14	9
3/4	(South Korea) Choi Jung-man	21	21
(India) Shashank Kumar	13	12
5/8	(France) David Toupé	21	21
(Thailand) Anuwat Sriboran	10	9
(England) David Follett	10	8
5/8	(South Korea) Jeong Jae-gun	21	21
(Brazil) Marcelo Alves Conceição	14	12
3/4	(Japan) Hiroshi Murayama	21	21
(Italy) Yuri Ferrigno	13	14
5/8	(Japan) Keita Nishimura	21	21
(India) Prem Kumar Ale	13	19
2	(Germany) Thomas Wandschneider	21	21

Quarter-finals
1	(Malaysia) Muhammad Ikhwan Ramli	21	21
(Japan) Osamu Nagashima	8	10
3/4	(South Korea) Choi Jung-man	21	21
5/8	(France) David Toupé	5	9
(South Korea) Jeong Jae-gun	21	21
3/4	(Japan) Hiroshi Murayama	19	7
5/8	(Japan) Keita Nishimura	21	19	26
2	(Germany) Thomas Wandschneider	17	21	24

Semi-finals
1	(Malaysia) Muhammad Ikhwan Ramli	13	17
3/4	(South Korea) Choi Jung-man	21	21
5/8	(South Korea) Jeong Jae-gun	16	8
5/8	(Japan) Keita Nishimura	21	21

Final
3/4	(South Korea) Choi Jung-man	21	21
5/8	(South Korea) Jeong Jae-gun	9	17

=== Men's singles WH2 ===
First Round
1	(Japan) Daiki Kajiwara	21	21
(Chile) Jaime Aranguiz	9	12
(South Korea) Yu Soo-young	21	21
(Australia) Qambar Ali Akhteyari	7	5
3/4	(Germany) Rick Cornell Hellmann	21	19	21
(Israel) Amir Levi	15	21	11
5/8	(Japan) Takumi Matsumoto	21	21
(Indonesia) Wiwin Andri	12	15
(India) Sanjeev Kumar	21	14	9
5/8	(Thailand) Dumnern Junthong	19	21	21
5/8	(Switzerland) Luca Olgiati	6	12
3/4	(Hong Kong) Chan Ho Yuen	21	21
(India) Abu Hubaida	22	17	14
5/8	(France) Thomas Jakobs	20	21	21
(Brazil) Julio Cesar Godoy	9	6
2	(South Korea) Kim Jung-jun	21	21

Quarter-finals
1	(Japan) Daiki Kajiwara	21	21
(South Korea) Yu Soo-young	12	11
3/4	(Germany) Rick Cornell Hellmann	21	21
5/8	(Japan) Takumi Matsumoto	9	17
(Thailand) Dumnern Junthong	11	7
3/4	(Hong Kong) Chan Ho Yuen	21	21
5/8	(France) Thomas Jakobs	12	6
2	(South Korea) Kim Jung-jun	21	21

Semi-finals
1	(Japan) Daiki Kajiwara	21	21
3/4	(Germany) Rick Cornell Hellmann	17	7
3/4	(Hong Kong) Chan Ho Yuen	21	17	15
2	(South Korea) Kim Jung-jun	16	21	21

Final
1	(Japan) Daiki Kajiwara	21	21
2	(South Korea) Kim Jung-jun	12	11

=== Men's singles SL3 ===
First Round
1	(India) Pramod Bhagat
Bye
(Ukraine) Oleksandr Chyrkov	21	21
(Indonesia) Maman Nurjaman	16	14
3/4	(Japan) Daisuke Fujihara
Bye
(Peru) Pedro Pablo de Vinatea	14	16
(South Korea) Joo Dong-jae	21	21
Bye
5	(France) Mathieu Thomas
Bye
3/4	(India) Manoj Sarkar
Bye
(England) William Smith
Bye
2	(India) Kumar Nitesh

Quarter-finals
1	(India) Pramod Bhagat	21	21
(Ukraine) Oleksandr Chyrkov	17	19
3/4	(Japan) Daisuke Fujihara	21	21
(South Korea) Joo Dong-jae	15	14
5	(France) Mathieu Thomas	21	12	9
3/4	(India) Manoj Sarkar	15	21	21
(England) William Smith	8	12
2	(India) Kumar Nitesh	21	21

Semi-finals
1	(India) Pramod Bhagat	22	21
3/4	(Japan) Daisuke Fujihara	20	14
3/4	(India) Manoj Sarkar	10	13
2	(India) Kumar Nitesh	21	21

Final
1	(India) Pramod Bhagat	21	21
2	(India) Kumar Nitesh	19	19

=== Men's singles SL4 ===
First Round
1	(France) Lucas Mazur	21	21
3/4	(Sweden) Rickard Nilsson	7	12
(Thailand) Siripong Teamarrom	21	21
(Japan) Kaito Nakamura	10	15
(India) Suhas Lalinakere Yathiraj	21	14	17
5/8	(Indonesia) Hikmat Ramdani	17	21	21
(Thailand) Chawarat Kitichokwattana	21	21
(Vietnam) Nguyễn Văn Thương	9	12
5/8	(India) Nilesh Balu Gaikwad	12	13
5/8	(Indonesia) Fredy Setiawan	21	21
3/4	(Germany) Marcel Adam	21	21
(Portugal) Diogo Daniel	9	15
(Singapore) Ang Chee Hiong	21	21
(Chinese Taipei) Yeh En-chuan	18	13
(South Korea) Shin Kyung-hwan	15	15
2	(India) Sukant Kadam	21	21

Quarter-finals
1	(France) Lucas Mazur	21	21
(Thailand) Siripong Teamarrom	15	12
5/8	(Indonesia) Hikmat Ramdani	21	21
(Thailand) Chawarat Kitichokwattana	8	16
5/8	(Indonesia) Fredy Setiawan	21	21
3/4	(Germany) Marcel Adam	16	12
(Singapore) Ang Chee Hiong	10	15
2	(India) Sukant Kadam	21	21

Semi-finals
1	(France) Lucas Mazur	21	21
5/8	(Indonesia) Hikmat Ramdani	11	11
5/8	(Indonesia) Fredy Setiawan	22	21
2	(India) Sukant Kadam	20	15

Final
1	(France) Lucas Mazur	21	21
5/8	(Indonesia) Fredy Setiawan	12	17

=== Men's singles SU5 ===
First Round
1	(Malaysia) Cheah Liek Hou	21	21
(India) Ruthick Ragupathi	16	8
5/8	(India) Chirag Baretha	17	12
(Chinese Taipei) Pu Gui-yu	21	21
3/4	(France) Méril Loquette	21	20	21
5/8	(Poland) Bartłomiej Mróz	17	22	18
5/8	(Indonesia) Suryo Nugroho	21	21
(Wales) David Jack Wilson	7	12
(Netherlands) Joshua Donker	7	15
(Turkey) İlker Tuzcu	21	21
(New Zealand) Thomas Denesfield Slade	5	5
3/4	(Japan) Taiyo Imai	21	21
(Malaysia) Mohamad Faris Ahmad Azri	16	10
5/8	(Indonesia) Dheva Anrimusthi	21	21
(France) Abdoullah Ait Bella	8	15
2	(Chinese Taipei) Fang Jen-yu	21	21

Quarter-finals
1	(Malaysia) Cheah Liek Hou	21	20	21
(Chinese Taipei) Pu Gui-yu	15	22	13
3/4	(France) Méril Loquette	17	14
5/8	(Indonesia) Suryo Nugroho	21	21
(Turkey) İlker Tuzcu	17	15
3/4	(Japan) Taiyo Imai	21	21
5/8	(Indonesia) Dheva Anrimusthi	18	21	21
2	(Chinese Taipei) Fang Jen-yu	21	16	11

Semi-finals
1	(Malaysia) Cheah Liek Hou	21	21
5/8	(Indonesia) Suryo Nugroho	13	19
3/4	(Japan) Taiyo Imai	13	12
5/8	(Indonesia) Dheva Anrimusthi	21	21

Final
1	(Malaysia) Cheah Liek Hou	21	21
5/8	(Indonesia) Dheva Anrimusthi	14	12

=== Men's singles SH6 ===
First Round
1	(England) Jack Shephard	21	21
(England) Isaak Dalglish	8	13
(India) Sivarajan Solaimalai	21	18	22
(Thailand) Natthapong Meechai	15	21	20
3/4	(Brazil) Vitor Tavares	21	21
(Canada) Wyatt Lightfoot	4	11
5/8	(France) Charles Noakes	20	21	21
(United States) Miles Krajewski	22	8	16
5/8	(Hong Kong) Wong Chun Yim	14	13
5/8	(England) Krysten Coombs	21	21
(France) Fabien Morat	10	14
3/4	(India) Krishna Nagar	21	21
(Indonesia) Subhan	21	21
5/8	(Japan) Yohei Hatakeyama	8	16
(India) Dhinagaran Pandurangan	6	3
2	(Hong Kong) Chu Man Kai	21	21

Quarter-finals
1	(England) Jack Shephard	21	19	21
(India) Sivarajan Solaimalai	19	21	19
3/4	(Brazil) Vitor Tavares	21	21
(France) Charles Noakes	13	17
5/8	(England) Krysten Coombs	15	23	21
3/4	(India) Krishna Nagar	21	21	19
(Indonesia) Subhan	16	8
2	(Hong Kong) Chu Man Kai	21	21

Semi-finals
1	(England) Jack Shephard	21	22
3/4	(Brazil) Vitor Tavares	14	20
5/8	(England) Krysten Coombs	5	21	9
2	(Hong Kong) Chu Man Kai	21	18	21

Final
1	(England) Jack Shephard	20	21	20
2	(Hong Kong) Chu Man Kai	22	13	22

=== Men's doubles WH1–WH2 ===
First Round
1	(Malaysia) Muhammad Ikhwan Ramli (Malaysia) Noor Azwan Noorlan
Bye
(Vietnam) Hoàng Mạnh Giang (Vietnam) Trương Ngọc Bình	21	21
(Egypt) Nasr Youssif Elsayed (Egypt) Atef Abdelkarim Mahmoud	6	6
3/4	(India) Prem Kumar Ale (India) Abu Hubaida
Bye
5/6	(France) Thomas Jakobs (France) David Toupé	20	21	21
(Thailand) Dumnern Junthong (Thailand) Anuwat Sriboran	22	11	19
(Japan) Daiki Kajiwara (Japan) Hiroshi Murayama	22	21	16
5/6	(South Korea) Jeong Jae-gun (South Korea) Yu Soo-young	24	19	21
Bye
3/4	(South Korea) Choi Jung-man (South Korea) Kim Jung-jun
(England) David Follett (India) Shashank Kumar	14	12
(Israel) Amir Levi (Russia) Konstantin Afinogenov	21	21
Bye
2	(Germany) Rick Cornell Hellmann (Germany) Thomas Wandschneider

Quarter-finals
1	(Malaysia) Muhammad Ikhwan Ramli (Malaysia) Noor Azwan Noorlan	21	21
(Vietnam) Hoàng Mạnh Giang (Vietnam) Trương Ngọc Bình	6	12
3/4	(India) Prem Kumar Ale (India) Abu Hubaida	21	11	23
5/6	(France) Thomas Jakobs (France) David Toupé	18	21	21
5/6	(South Korea) Jeong Jae-gun (South Korea) Yu Soo-young	14	22	24
3/4	(South Korea) Choi Jung-man (South Korea) Kim Jung-jun	21	20	22
(Israel) Amir Levi (Russia) Konstantin Afinogenov	15	7
2	(Germany) Rick Cornell Hellmann (Germany) Thomas Wandschneider	21	21

Semi-finals
1	(Malaysia) Muhammad Ikhwan Ramli (Malaysia) Noor Azwan Noorlan	21	18	21
5/6	(France) Thomas Jakobs (France) David Toupé	18	21	19
5/6	(South Korea) Jeong Jae-gun (South Korea) Yu Soo-young	13	21	22
2	(Germany) Rick Cornell Hellmann (Germany) Thomas Wandschneider	21	18	24

Final
1	(Malaysia) Muhammad Ikhwan Ramli (Malaysia) Noor Azwan Noorlan	11	15
2	(Germany) Rick Cornell Hellmann (Germany) Thomas Wandschneider	21	21

=== Men's doubles SL3–SL4 ===
Quarterfinals
1	(India) Pramod Bhagat (India) Manoj Sarkar
Bye
(Thailand) Mongkhon Bunsun (Thailand) Siripong Teamarrom	17	16
3	(France) Guillaume Gailly (France) Mathieu Thomas	21	21
(South Korea) Joo Dong-jae (South Korea) Shin Kyung-hwan	21	21
(India) Umesh Vikram Kumar (India) Suhas Lalinakere Yathiraj	12	16
Bye
(Indonesia) Hikmat Ramdani (Indonesia) Ukun Rukaendi

Semifinals
1	(India) Pramod Bhagat (India) Manoj Sarkar	21	21
3	(France) Guillaume Gailly (France) Mathieu Thomas	8	16
(South Korea) Joo Dong-jae (South Korea) Shin Kyung-hwan	21	8	18
(Indonesia) Hikmat Ramdani (Indonesia) Ukun Rukaendi	18	21	21

Finals
1	(India) Pramod Bhagat (India) Manoj Sarkar	21	18	13
(Indonesia) Hikmat Ramdani (Indonesia) Ukun Rukaendi	14	21	21

=== Men's doubles SU5 ===
Semi-finals
1	(Indonesia) Dheva Anrimusthi (Indonesia) Hafizh Briliansyah Prawiranegara	21	21
2	(India) Chirag Baretha (India) Raj Kumar	14	15
(India) Hardik Makkar (India) Ruthick Ragupathi	9	15
(Malaysia) Cheah Liek Hou (Malaysia) Mohamad Faris Ahmad Azri	21	21

Final
1	(Indonesia) Dheva Anrimusthi (Indonesia) Hafizh Briliansyah Prawiranegara	21	21
(Malaysia) Cheah Liek Hou (Malaysia) Mohamad Faris Ahmad Azri	13	12

=== Men's doubles SH6 ===
Quarterfinals
(South Korea) Lee Dae-sung (Thailand) Natthapong Meechai
Bye
3	(India) Dhinagaran Pandurangan (India) Sivarajan Solaimalai	15	7
1	(Hong Kong) Chu Man Kai (Hong Kong) Wong Chun Yim	21	21
(India) Gokul Das Areeparamb Vadakkayil (India) Akash Sethu Madhavan	5	17
(United States) Miles Krajewski (Brazil) Vitor Tavares	21	21
Bye
2	(France) Fabien Morat (France) Charles Noakes

Semifinals
(South Korea) Lee Dae-sung (Thailand) Natthapong Meechai	21	21
1	(Hong Kong) Chu Man Kai (Hong Kong) Wong Chun Yim	16	17
(United States) Miles Krajewski (Brazil) Vitor Tavares	21	21
2	(France) Fabien Morat (France) Charles Noakes	18	8

Finals
(South Korea) Lee Dae-sung (Thailand) Natthapong Meechai	19	21	21
(United States) Miles Krajewski (Brazil) Vitor Tavares	21	11	15

== Women's events ==
=== Women's singles WH1 ===
Quarterfinals
1	(Japan) Sarina Satomi	21	21
(South Korea) Kang Jung-kum	5	7
(South Korea) Kwon Hyun-ah	21	21
(India) Nirmala Devi	1	0
(Canada) Yuka Chokyu	5	8
(Austria) Henriett Koósz	21	21
(Belgium) To Man-kei	21	21	18
2	(Switzerland) Cynthia Mathez	23	10	21

Semifinals
1	(Japan) Sarina Satomi	21	21
(South Korea) Kwon Hyun-ah	15	7
3/4	(Austria) Henriett Koósz	13	8
2	(Switzerland) Cynthia Mathez	21	21

Finals
1	(Japan) Sarina Satomi	21	21
2	(Switzerland) Cynthia Mathez	9	10

=== Women's singles WH2 ===
Quarterfinals
1	(Switzerland) Ilaria Renggli	21	21
(Brazil) Maria Antunes	3	4
3/4	(Turkey) Emine Seçkin	21	21
(South Korea) Lee Sun-ae	15	13
(South Korea) Jung Gyeo-ul	19	20
3/4	(Peru) Pilar Jáuregui	21	22
(India) Ammu Mohan	1	2
2	(Japan) Yuma Yamazaki	21	21

Semifinals
1	(Switzerland) Ilaria Renggli	11	9
3/4	(Turkey) Emine Seçkin	21	21
3/4	(Peru) Pilar Jáuregui	21	21
2	(Japan) Yuma Yamazaki	17	11

Finals
3/4	(Turkey) Emine Seçkin	18	22	17
3/4	(Peru) Pilar Jáuregui	21	20	21

=== Women's singles SL3 ===
First Round
1	(India) Manasi Joshi
Bye
(Thailand) Darunee Henpraiwan	21	21
5/6	(Thailand) Kamtam Wandee	15	14
3/4	(India) Mandeep Kaur
Bye
(Ukraine) Oksana Kozyna	21	21
(Australia) Amonrat Jamporn	13	6
(France) Coraline Bergeron	17	17
(Australia) Celine Vinot	21	21
Bye
3/4	(Turkey) Halime Yıldız
(Peru) Flor Vasquez	4	5
(Brazil) Adriane Avila	21	21
Bye
2	(India) Parul Dalsukhbhai Parmar

Quarter-finals
1	(India) Manasi Joshi	21	21
(Thailand) Darunee Henpraiwan	12	17
3/4	(India) Mandeep Kaur	21	16	19
(Ukraine) Oksana Kozyna	10	21	21
(Australia) Celine Vinot	19	15
3/4	(Turkey) Halime Yıldız	21	21
(Brazil) Adriane Avila	12	21	15
2	(India) Parul Dalsukhbhai Parmar	21	19	21

Semi-finals
1	(India) Manasi Joshi	18	18
(Ukraine) Oksana Kozyna	21	21
3/4	(Turkey) Halime Yıldız	21	21
2	(India) Parul Dalsukhbhai Parmar	16	6

Final
(Ukraine) Oksana Kozyna	20	21	21
3/4	(Turkey) Halime Yıldız	22	18	14

=== Women's singles SL4 ===
Quarterfinals
1	(Japan) Haruka Fujino	21	14	21
(Turkey) Tuğçe Çelik	13	21	15
(Indonesia) Khalimatus Sadiyah	21	21
(France) Milena Surreau	17	9
3/4	(France) Faustine Noël	21	21
3/4	(India) Jyothi Verma	12	11
(France) Lénaïg Morin	11	8
2	(Norway) Helle Sofie Sagøy	21	21

Semifinals
1	(Japan) Haruka Fujino	21	12	21
(Indonesia) Khalimatus Sadiyah	15	21	13
3/4	(France) Faustine Noël	7	17
2	(Norway) Helle Sofie Sagøy	21	21

Finals
1	(Japan) Haruka Fujino	9	21	10
2	(Norway) Helle Sofie Sagøy	21	19	21

=== Women's singles SU5 ===
Quarterfinals
1	(India) Manisha Ramadass	21	21
(India) Shanthiya Viswanathan	8	8
3/4	(Denmark) Cathrine Rosengren	21	21
(Spain) Cristina Sánchez	6	6
(Portugal) Beatriz Monteiro	14	19
3/4	(Japan) Mamiko Toyoda	21	21
(India) Arati Janoba Patil	12	5
2	(Japan) Kaede Kameyama	21	21

Semifinals
1	(India) Manisha Ramadass	21	17	21
3/4	(Denmark) Cathrine Rosengren	19	21	17
3/4	(Japan) Mamiko Toyoda	21	21
2	(Japan) Kaede Kameyama	15	14

Finals
1	(India) Manisha Ramadass	21	21
3/4	(Japan) Mamiko Toyoda	15	15

=== Women's singles SH6 ===
First Round
1	(Peru) Giuliana Póveda
Bye
5/6	(Egypt) Yasmina Eissa	11	12
3/4	(England) Rachel Choong	21	21
3/4	(Poland) Oliwia Szmigiel
Bye
(Chinese Taipei) Yu Yen-wu	18	18
(Thailand) Chai Saeyang	21	21
(Hong Kong) Choi Wing Kei	2	6
3/4	(Poland) Daria Bujnicka	21	21
Bye
(Indonesia) Rina Marlina
(Chinese Taipei) Cai Yi-lin	21	21
(Hong Kong) Lam Ching Yung	7	15
Bye
2	(India) Nithya Sre Sivan

Quarter-finals
1	(Peru) Giuliana Póveda	21	21
3/4	(England) Rachel Choong	15	6
3/4	(Poland) Oliwia Szmigiel	21	21
(Thailand) Chai Saeyang	16	13
3/4	(Poland) Daria Bujnicka	1	6
(Indonesia) Rina Marlina	21	21
(Chinese Taipei) Cai Yi-lin	13	6
2	(India) Nithya Sre Sivan	21	21

Semi-finals
1	(Peru) Giuliana Póveda	21	21
3/4	(Poland) Oliwia Szmigiel	15	7
(Indonesia) Rina Marlina	21	12	21
2	(India) Nithya Sre Sivan	19	21	19

Final
1	(Peru) Giuliana Póveda	14	14
(Indonesia) Rina Marlina	21	21

=== Women's doubles WH1–WH2 ===
Quarterfinals
1	(Japan) Sarina Satomi (Japan) Yuma Yamazaki
Bye
2	(South Korea) Jung Gyeo-ul (South Korea) Kwon Hyun-ah	21	21
(South Korea) Kang Jung-kum (South Korea) Lee Sun-ae	9	12
(Chinese Taipei) Hu Guang-chiou (Chinese Taipei) Yang I-chen	10	10
3	(Switzerland) Cynthia Mathez (Switzerland) Ilaria Renggli	21	21
Bye
(Turkey) Emine Seçkin (Belgium) To Man-kei

Semifinals
1	(Japan) Sarina Satomi (Japan) Yuma Yamazaki	21	21
2	(South Korea) Jung Gyeo-ul (South Korea) Kwon Hyun-ah	14	16
3	(Switzerland) Cynthia Mathez (Switzerland) Ilaria Renggli	21	10	14
(Turkey) Emine Seçkin (Belgium) To Man-kei	12	21	21

Finals
1	(Japan) Sarina Satomi (Japan) Yuma Yamazaki	21	21
(Turkey) Emine Seçkin (Belgium) To Man-kei	11	15

=== Women's doubles SL3–SU5 ===
Quarterfinals
1	(India) Mandeep Kaur (India) Manisha Ramadass	21	21
3/4	(India) Manasi Joshi (India) Shanthiya Viswanathan	17	15
(France) Lénaïg Morin (France) Faustine Noël	21	21
(Italy) Rosa Efomo de Marco (Australia) Amonrat Jamporn	14	15
(Turkey) Tuğçe Çelik (Turkey) Halime Yıldız	8	13
3/4	(Indonesia) Leani Ratri Oktila (Indonesia) Khalimatus Sadiyah	21	21
(Portugal) Beatriz Monteiro (France) Catherine Naudin	9	9
2	(Thailand) Nipada Saensupa (Thailand) Chanida Srinavakul	21	21

Semifinals
1	(India) Mandeep Kaur (India) Manisha Ramadass	17	21	18
(France) Lénaïg Morin (France) Faustine Noël	21	13	21
3/4	(Indonesia) Leani Ratri Oktila (Indonesia) Khalimatus Sadiyah	21	21
2	(Thailand) Nipada Saensupa (Thailand) Chanida Srinavakul	13	8

Finals
(France) Lénaïg Morin (France) Faustine Noël	14	21	13
3/4	(Indonesia) Leani Ratri Oktila (Indonesia) Khalimatus Sadiyah	21	16	21

=== Women's doubles SH6 ===
Semifinals
1	(Poland) Daria Bujnicka (Poland) Oliwia Szmigiel	21	21
(Thailand) Chai Saeyang (India) Latatai Parmeshwar Umrekar	8	11
(India) Rachana Patel (India) Nithya Sre Sivan	7	3^{r}
2	(Peru) Rubí Fernández (Peru) Giuliana Póveda	21	6

Finals
1	(Poland) Daria Bujnicka (Poland) Oliwia Szmigiel	13	14
2	(Peru) Rubí Fernández (Peru) Giuliana Póveda	21	21

== Mixed events ==
=== Mixed doubles WH1–WH2 ===
Quarterfinals
(South Korea) Choi Jung-man (South Korea) Lee Sun-ae
Bye
3	(Spain) Ignacio Fernández (Austria) Henriett Koósz	21	21
(India) Shashank Kumar (India) Ammu Mohan	15	5
1	(Italy) Yuri Ferrigno (Peru) Pilar Jáuregui	21	21
(Spain) Francisco Motero (Turkey) Narin Uluç	15	13
Bye
2	(South Korea) Yu Soo-young (South Korea) Kwon Hyun-ah

Semifinals
(South Korea) Choi Jung-man (South Korea) Lee Sun-ae	21	21
3	(Spain) Ignacio Fernández (Austria) Henriett Koósz	9	12
1	(Italy) Yuri Ferrigno (Peru) Pilar Jáuregui	21	13	21
2	(South Korea) Yu Soo-young (South Korea) Kwon Hyun-ah	19	21	10

Finals
(South Korea) Choi Jung-man (South Korea) Lee Sun-ae	21	21
1	(Italy) Yuri Ferrigno (Peru) Pilar Jáuregui	17	12

=== Mixed doubles SL3–SU5 ===
First Round
(Indonesia) Fredy Setiawan (Indonesia) Khalimatus Sadiyah
Bye
Bye
(England) Bobby Griffin (England) Emma Louise Stoner
3/4	(Germany) Jan-Niklas Pott (Germany) Katrin Seibert
Bye
2	(India) Ruthick Ragupathi (India) Manasi Joshi	24	21
(Japan) Taiyo Imai (Japan) Noriko Ito	22	18
Bye
5/6	(India) Chirag Baretha (India) Mandeep Kaur
Bye
3/4	(Thailand) Siripong Teamarrom (Thailand) Nipada Saensupa
(India) Raj Kumar (India) Parul Dalsukhbhai Parmar	12	21	12
1	(France) Lucas Mazur (France) Faustine Noël	21	17	21
Bye
(Indonesia) Hary Susanto (Indonesia) Leani Ratri Oktila

Quarter-finals
(Indonesia) Fredy Setiawan (Indonesia) Khalimatus Sadiyah	21	21
(England) Bobby Griffin (England) Emma Louise Stoner	5	2
3/4	(Germany) Jan-Niklas Pott (Germany) Katrin Seibert	18	10
2	(India) Ruthick Ragupathi (India) Manasi Joshi	21	21
5/6	(India) Chirag Baretha (India) Mandeep Kaur	14	8
3/4	(Thailand) Siripong Teamarrom (Thailand) Nipada Saensupa	21	21
1	(France) Lucas Mazur (France) Faustine Noël	21	21
(Indonesia) Hary Susanto (Indonesia) Leani Ratri Oktila	15	11

Semi-finals
(Indonesia) Fredy Setiawan (Indonesia) Khalimatus Sadiyah	21	21
2	(India) Ruthick Ragupathi (India) Manasi Joshi	10	8
3/4	(Thailand) Siripong Teamarrom (Thailand) Nipada Saensupa	21	21
1	(France) Lucas Mazur (France) Faustine Noël	19	19

Final
(Indonesia) Fredy Setiawan (Indonesia) Khalimatus Sadiyah	21	21
3/4	(Thailand) Siripong Teamarrom (Thailand) Nipada Saensupa	15	12

=== Mixed doubles SH6 ===
Quarterfinals
(India) Krishna Nagar (India) Nithya Sre Sivan	23	21
(Hong Kong) Chu Man Kai (Hong Kong) Choi Wing Kei	21	18
1	(Peru) Nilton Quispe (Peru) Giuliana Póveda	21	21
3/4	(Peru) Hector Jesus Salva Tunque (Peru) Rubí Fernández	18	8
(India) Sivarajan Solaimalai (India) Rachana Patel	12	8
(Indonesia) Subhan (Indonesia) Rina Marlina	21	21
3/4	(England) Jack Shephard (England) Rachel Choong	23	21
2	(Thailand) Natthapong Meechai (Thailand) Chai Saeyang	21	19

Semifinals
(India) Krishna Nagar (India) Nithya Sre Sivan	16	18
3/4	(Peru) Nilton Quispe (Peru) Giuliana Póveda	21	21
(Indonesia) Subhan (Indonesia) Rina Marlina	21	21
3/4	(England) Jack Shephard (England) Rachel Choong	8	12

Finals
(Peru) Nilton Quispe (Peru) Giuliana Póveda	9	15
(Indonesia) Subhan (Indonesia) Rina Marlina	21	21
