= 2017 BWF Para-Badminton World Championships =

Tournament details
- Dates: 22 November - 26 November
- Edition: 11th
- Competitors: 264 from 39 nations
- Venue: Dongchun Gymnasium
- Location: Ulsan, South Korea

The 2017 BWF Para-Badminton World Championships was held from 22 to 26 December 2017 in Ulsan, South Korea.

== Participating countries ==
264 athletes from 39 countries participated in this edition of Para-Badminton World Championships.

- Australia (8)
- Austria (1)
- Belgium (1)
- Brazil (1)
- Canada (3)
- China (18)
- Chinese Taipei (8)
- Denmark (3)
- England (13)
- Finland (2)
- France (15)
- Germany (11)
- Greece (2)
- Guatemala (1)
- Hong Kong (5)
- India (25)
- Indonesia (10)
- Ireland (3)
- Italy (5)
- Japan (28)
- Macau (2)
- Malaysia (5)
- Netherlands (2)
- New Zealand (1)
- Norway (1)
- Peru (4)
- Poland (5)
- Russia (11)
- Scotland (5)
- South Korea (18)
- Spain (2)
- Sri Lanka (2)
- Sweden (1)
- Switzerland (4)
- Thailand (19)
- Tonga (1)
- Turkey (10)
- United States (2)
- Vietnam (6)

== Medalists ==
=== Men's event ===
Event	Gold	Silver	Bronze
Singles WH1	(South Korea) Lee Sam-seop	(China) Qu Zimao	(Germany) Thomas Wandschneider
Singles WH1	(South Korea) Lee Sam-seop	(China) Qu Zimao	(South Korea) Lee Dong-seop
Singles WH2	(South Korea) Kim Jung-jun	(South Korea) Kim Kyung-hoon	(Hong Kong) Chan Ho Yuen
Singles WH2	(South Korea) Kim Jung-jun	(South Korea) Kim Kyung-hoon	(Malaysia) Madzlan Saibon
Singles SL3	(Indonesia) Ukun Rukaendi	(India) Manoj Sarkar	(China) Chen Xiaoyu
Singles SL3	(Indonesia) Ukun Rukaendi	(India) Manoj Sarkar	(India) Pramod Bhagat
Singles SL4	(France) Lucas Mazur	(India) Tarun Dhillon	(Indonesia) Fredy Setiawan
Singles SL4	(France) Lucas Mazur	(India) Tarun Dhillon	(Malaysia) Bakri Omar
Singles SU5	(Malaysia) Cheah Liek Hou	(Indonesia) Suryo Nugroho	(Japan) Taiyo Imai
Singles SU5	(Malaysia) Cheah Liek Hou	(Indonesia) Suryo Nugroho	(Poland) Bartlomiej Mroz
Singles SS6	(England) Jack Shephard	(England) Krysten Coombs	(Hong Kong) Wong Chun Yim
Singles SS6	(England) Jack Shephard	(England) Krysten Coombs	(Malaysia) Didin Taresoh
Doubles WH1-WH2	(South Korea) Kim Jung-jun (South Korea) Lee Sam-seop	(South Korea) Choi Jung-man (South Korea) Kim Sung-hun	(Thailand) Junthong Dumnern (Thailand) Jakarin Homhaul
Doubles WH1-WH2	(South Korea) Kim Jung-jun (South Korea) Lee Sam-seop	(South Korea) Choi Jung-man (South Korea) Kim Sung-hun	(South Korea) Kim Kyung-hoon (South Korea) Lee Dong-seop
Doubles SL3-SL4	(Indonesia) Ukun Rukaendi (Indonesia) Hary Susanto	(China) Chen Xiaoyu (China) Yang Jianyuan	(Thailand) Siripong Teamarrom (France) Mathieu Thomas
Doubles SL3-SL4	(Indonesia) Ukun Rukaendi (Indonesia) Hary Susanto	(China) Chen Xiaoyu (China) Yang Jianyuan	(Thailand) Chawarat Kitichokwattana (India) Umesh Vikram Kumar
Doubles SU5	(Indonesia) Suryo Nugroho (Singapore) Tay Wei Ming	(Malaysia) Cheah Liek Hou (Malaysia) Saaba Hairol Fozi	(India) Ray Kumar (India) Rakesh Pandey
Doubles SU5	(Indonesia) Suryo Nugroho (Singapore) Tay Wei Ming	(Malaysia) Cheah Liek Hou (Malaysia) Saaba Hairol Fozi	(South Korea) Kim Gi-yeon (South Korea) Shin Kyung-hwan
Doubles SS6	(Hong Kong) Chu Man Kai (Hong Kong) Wong Chun Yim	(England) Krysten Coombs (England) Jack Shephard	(Russia) Alexander Mekhdiev (France) Fabien Morat
Doubles SS6	(Hong Kong) Chu Man Kai (Hong Kong) Wong Chun Yim	(England) Krysten Coombs (England) Jack Shephard	(India) Mark Joseph Dharmai (India) Raja Magotra

=== Women's events ===
Event	Gold	Silver	Bronze
Singles WH1	(China) Li Hongyan	(China) Zhang Jing	(South Korea) Son Ok-cha
Singles WH1	(China) Li Hongyan	(China) Zhang Jing	(Thailand) Sujirat Pookkham
Singles WH2	(China) Liu Yutong	(China) Xu Tingting	(South Korea) Lee Sun-ae
Singles WH2	(China) Liu Yutong	(China) Xu Tingting	(Thailand) Amnouy Wetwithan
Singles SL3	(India) Parul Parmar	(Thailand) Wannaphatdee Kamtam	(India) Manasi Joshi
Singles SL3	(India) Parul Parmar	(Thailand) Wannaphatdee Kamtam	(Thailand) Darunee Henpraiwan
Singles SL4	(China) Cheng Hefang	(Indonesia) Leani Ratri Oktila	(China) Ma Huihui
Singles SL4	(China) Cheng Hefang	(Indonesia) Leani Ratri Oktila	(Indonesia) Khalimatus Sadiyah
Singles SU5	(Japan) Ayako Suzuki	(China) Yang Qiuxia	(Denmark) Cathrine Rosengren
Singles SU5	(Japan) Ayako Suzuki	(China) Yang Qiuxia	(Japan) Mamiko Toyoda
Singles SS6	(England) Rachel Choong	(Peru) Giuliana Póveda	(England) Rebecca Bedford
Singles SS6	(England) Rachel Choong	(Peru) Giuliana Póveda	(Poland) Maria Bartusz
Doubles WH1-WH2	(China) Li Hongyan (China) Yang Fan	(Thailand) Sujirat Pookkham (Thailand) Amnouy Wetwithan	(Japan) Ikume Fuke (Japan) Yuma Yamazaki
Doubles WH1-WH2	(China) Li Hongyan (China) Yang Fan	(Thailand) Sujirat Pookkham (Thailand) Amnouy Wetwithan	(China) Liu Yutong (China) Zhang Jing
Doubles SL3-SU5	(India) Parul Parmar (Japan) Akiko Sugino	(China) Cheng Hefang (China) Ma Huihui	(Indonesia) Leani Ratri Oktila (Indonesia) Khalimatus Sadiyah
Doubles SL3-SU5	(India) Parul Parmar (Japan) Akiko Sugino	(China) Cheng Hefang (China) Ma Huihui	(Japan) Noriko Ito (Japan) Mamiko Toyoda
Doubles SS6	(England) Rebecca Bedford (England) Rachel Choong	(Poland) Maria Bartusz (Republic of Ireland) Emma Farnham	(Sri Lanka) Randika Doling (Peru) Giuliana Póveda
Doubles SS6	(England) Rebecca Bedford (England) Rachel Choong	(Poland) Maria Bartusz (Republic of Ireland) Emma Farnham	(Poland) Daria Bujnicka (Poland) Oliwia Szmigiel

=== Mixed events ===
Event	Gold	Silver	Bronze
Doubles WH1-WH2	(Thailand) Jakarin Homhaul (Thailand) Amnouy Wetwithan	(South Korea) Lee Sam-seop (South Korea) Lee Sun-ae	(South Korea) Kim Jung-jun (South Korea) Kang Jung-kum
Doubles WH1-WH2	(Thailand) Jakarin Homhaul (Thailand) Amnouy Wetwithan	(South Korea) Lee Sam-seop (South Korea) Lee Sun-ae	(China) Mai Jianpeng (China) Li Hongyan
Doubles SL3-SU5	(Indonesia) Hary Susanto (Indonesia) Leani Ratri Oktila	(China) Yang Jianyuan (China) Yang Qiuxia	(Germany) Marcel Adam (Germany) Katrin Seibert
Doubles SL3-SU5	(Indonesia) Hary Susanto (Indonesia) Leani Ratri Oktila	(China) Yang Jianyuan (China) Yang Qiuxia	(Japan) Toshiaki Suenaga (Japan) Akiko Sugino
Doubles SS6	(England) Andrew Martin (England) Rachel Choong	(France) Fabien Morat (England) Rebecca Bedford	(Republic of Ireland) Niall McVeigh (Peru) Giuliana Póveda
Doubles SS6	(England) Andrew Martin (England) Rachel Choong	(France) Fabien Morat (England) Rebecca Bedford	(India) Raja Magotra (India) Ruhi Satish Shingade

== Medal table ==
Rank	Nation	Gold	Silver	Bronze	Total
1	China	4	7	4	15
2	England	4	2.5	0	6.5
3	Indonesia	3.5	2	3	8.5
4	South Korea*	3	3	6	12
5	India	1.5	2	5.5	9
6	Japan	1.5	0	5	6.5
7	Thailand	1	2	5	8
8	Malaysia	1	1	3	5
9	France	1	0.5	1	2.5
10	Hong Kong	1	0	2	3
11	Singapore	0.5	0	0	0.5
12	Peru	0	1	1	2
13	Poland	0	0.5	3	3.5
14	Ireland	0	0.5	0.5	1
15	Germany	0	0	2	2
16	Denmark	0	0	1	1
17	Russia	0	0	0.5	0.5
17	Sri Lanka	0	0	0.5	0.5
Totals (18 entries)		22	22	43	87
