= Stoke Mandeville Stadium =

Sports venue in Aylesbury, England

Coordinates: 51.79965°N 0.80235°W

Stoke Mandeville Stadium is the National Centre for Disability Sport in England. It is sited alongside Stoke Mandeville Hospital in Aylesbury in Buckinghamshire. The Stadium is owned by WheelPower, the national organisation for wheelchair sport.

== History ==
The Stadium developed out of the Stoke Mandeville Games — the forerunner of the Paralympic Games — founded in 1948 by Ludwig Guttmann. He was a neurosurgeon at the National Spinal Injuries Centre at Stoke Mandeville Hospital who recognised the value of exercise and competition in the rehabilitation of ex-members of the British armed forces. By 1961 Guttmann had founded the British Sports Association for the Disabled (now named English Federation of Disability Sport), expanding the concept of organising sport for men, women and children with disabilities and developing Stoke Mandeville Stadium into an international centre of disabled sport. The stadium was officially opened by Queen Elizabeth II on 2 August 1969.

When Sir Ludwig Guttmann died in 1980 the Stadium was renamed Ludwig Guttmann Sports Centre for the Disabled. In 1993 the Stadium hosted the first international ex-service wheelchair games, organised by the Royal British Legion and opened by King Hussein and Queen Noor of Jordan. In 2001, following a £10 million refurbishment, it was again renamed as "Stoke Mandeville Stadium". The Paralympic mascot Mandeville is so named due to the legacy with the games.

== Facilities ==
Facilities include a 400-metre outdoor running track, Cazenove Sports Hall, a 25m six-lane swimming pool, tennis courts and an indoor bowls arena. In addition the Stadium has its own "Olympic Village" accommodation for athletes and the Olympic Lodge Hotel and the Wolfson Conference Centre provide guest facilities.

== 1984 Summer Paralympic Games ==
Stoke Mandeville Stadium was one of the two venues of the VII Paralympic Games, the last of the Summer Paralympics not held in the same venue as the Summer Olympic Games.

== Paralympic Flame Lighting ==
From the Paris 2024 Paralympic Games, Stoke Mandeville will be the lighting point for all future Paralympic torches. In the same way the Olympic Flame is kindled at Olympia in Greece, the start of the Paralympic Torch Relay will begin in Buckinghamshire. This is in recognition of Stoke Mandeville’s legacy as the birthplace of the Paralympic movement.

The Paralympic Flame Relay first started at Stoke Mandeville Stadium ahead of the London 2012 Paralympic Games and a flame was created every two years ahead of winter and summer Games.

== See also ==
- IWAS World Games
