= BWF Para-Badminton World Championships =

Badminton championships

- Current season, competition or edition: 2026 BWF Para-Badminton World Championships
- Formerly: IBAD World Championships
- Sport: Badminton
- Founded: 1998; 28 years ago
- Country: BWF member nations

The BWF Para-Badminton World Championships (formerly known as the IBAD Para-Badminton World Championships) is a badminton tournament organised by the Badminton World Federation. It's the most prestigious badminton competition, offering the most ranking points, along with the Summer Paralympics badminton events introduced in 2020. The highest ranked para-badminton players compete in six sport classes in five categories. The championships were organised under the Para Badminton World Federation (PBWF) before it merged with the BWF in June 2011.

== Editions ==
The table below gives an overview of all host cities and countries of the Para-Badminton World Championships.

Host cities of the Para-Badminton World Championships (Europe)
Host cities of the Para-Badminton World Championships (Asia)
Host cities of the Para-Badminton World Championships

Year	Edition	Host city	Dates	Top Nation
1998	1	Amersfoort, Netherlands		
2000	2	Borken, Germany		
2001	3	Cordoba, Spain		
2003	4	Cardiff, Wales	5 – 8 June	Chinese Taipei
2005	5	Hsinchu, Taiwan	27 October – 1 November	Malaysia
2007	6	Bangkok, Thailand	29 October – 2 November	South Korea
2009	7	Seoul, South Korea	8–12 September	South Korea
2011	8	Guatemala City, Guatemala	23–26 November	South Korea
2013	9	Dortmund, Germany	5–10 November	South Korea
2015	10	Stoke Mandeville, England	10–13 September	South Korea
2017	11	Ulsan, South Korea	22–26 November	China
2019	12	Basel, Switzerland	20–25 August	China
2022	13	Tokyo, Japan	1–6 November	Indonesia
2024	14	Pattaya, Thailand	20–25 February	China
2026	15	Manama, Bahrain	7–14 February	China
2028	16	São Paulo, Brazil	14–20 February	

== See also ==
- BWF World Championships
- Badminton at the Summer Paralympics
