= Para badminton =

Badminton variation for disabled people

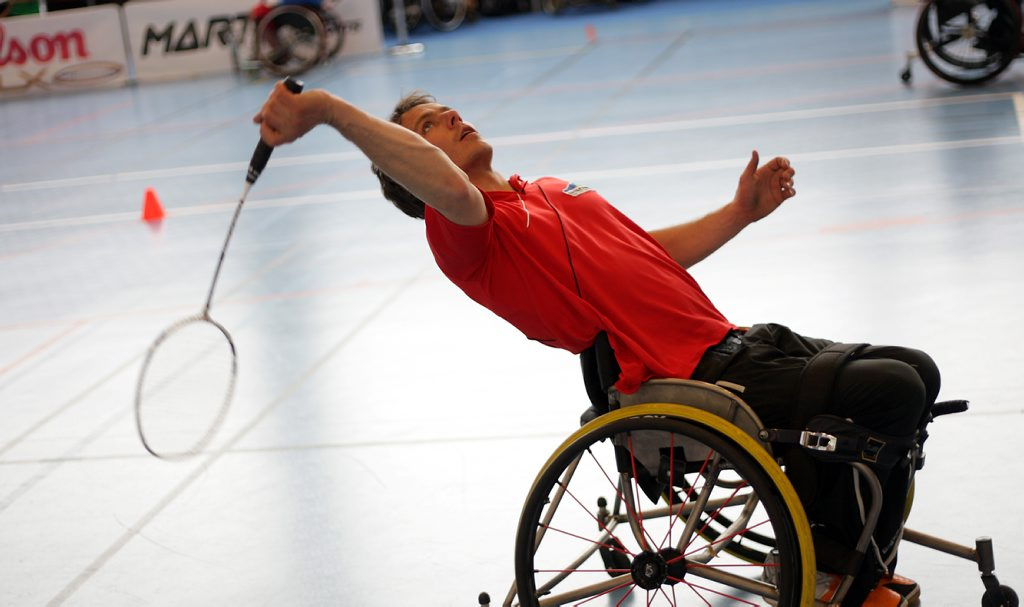
David Toupé, one of para-badminton players from WH1 class.

Para badminton is a variant of badminton for athletes with a range of physical disabilities. Badminton World Federation (BWF) is the main governing body for para-badminton starting from June 2011. The sport was governed by Para Badminton World Federation (PBWF) until a unanimous decision to join BWF during a meeting in Dortmund in June 2011.

== History ==
The first governing body of para badminton was the International Badminton Association for Disabled (IBAD), which was founded in 1995 in Stoke Mandeville; the birthplace of the Paralympic Movement~~s~~. The sport has been contested internationally since the 1990s, with the first para badminton world championship being held in the Netherlands in 1998. It made its first Paralympic Games appearance during Tokyo 2020. At the Paris 2024 Paralympic Games, 120 athletes competed across 16 medal events, representing 31 nations. The sport is recognized and practiced in over 60 countries worldwide and included in the LA 2028 Paralympic Games program.

== Rules ==
The first player to reach 21 points on two games claims victory, with a best of three format. The size of the court in para badminton court changes according to the category. Wheelchair singles use full

of the court; the height of net is the same for all classes. Extra wheels are integrated in the wheelchairs for extra balance and low backrests for clearer shots. The net area is not played in wheelchair badminton, as athletes can have time and mobility to maneuver and hit the shuttle. Athletes in other classes compete in full courts and the net.

== Classification ==
Athletes compete in men’s and women’s singles, men’s and women’s doubles and mixed doubles in three classes: wheelchair, standing and short stature. Players are classified to six different classes determined by BWF:

=== Wheelchair ===
- WH1
  Players in this class are those who have impairment in both lower limbs and trunk function and require wheelchair to play
- WH2
  Players have impairment in one or both lower limbs and minimal or no impairment of the trunk and also require wheelchair

=== Standing ===
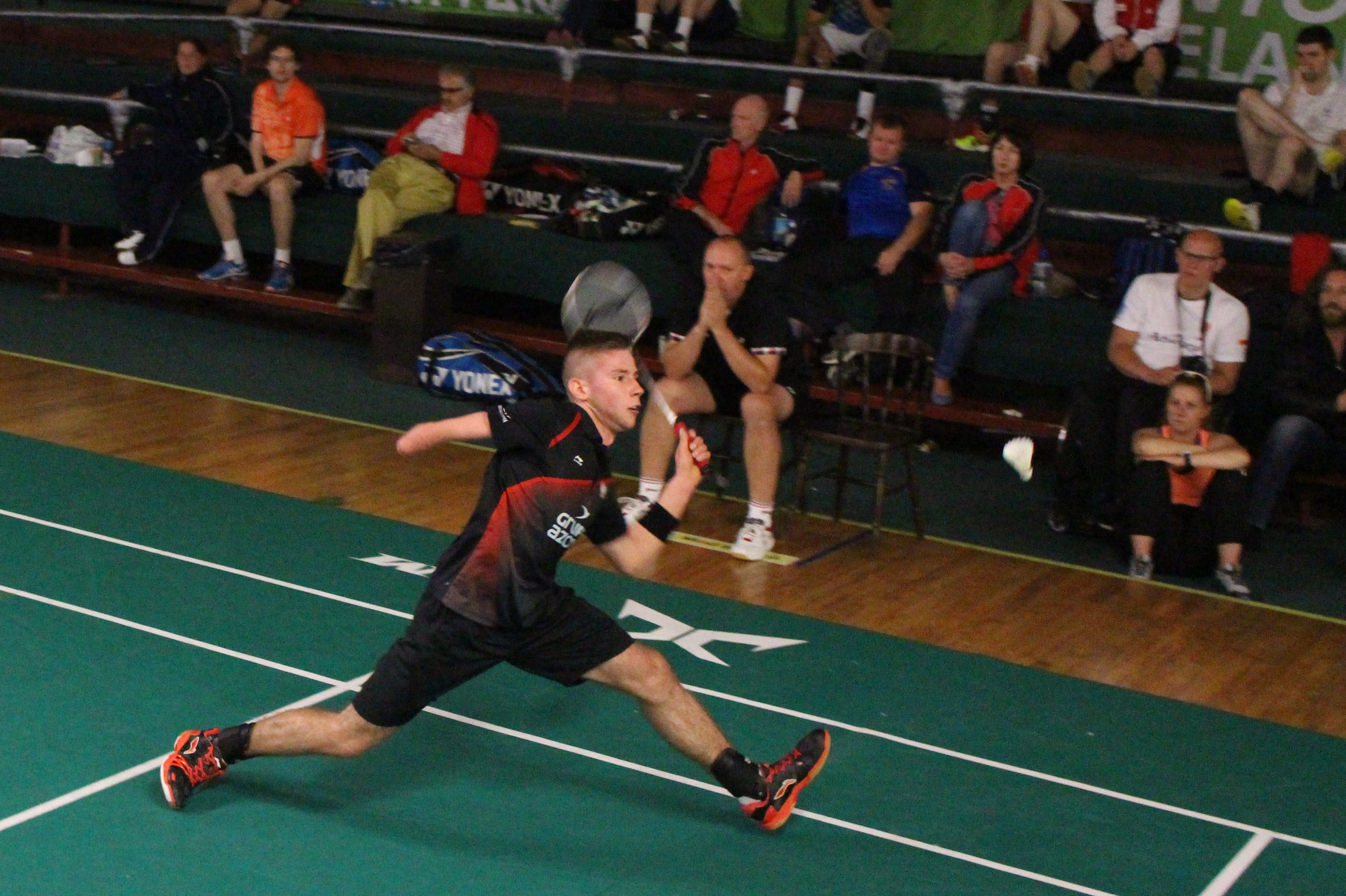
Bartłomiej Mróz, one of para-badminton players from SU5 class.

- SL3
  Players have impairment in one or both lower limbs and poor walking/running balance
- SL4
  Players have impairment in one or both lower limbs and minimal impairment in walking/running balance (better walking/running compared to SL3)
- SU5
  Players have impairment of the upper limbs.

=== Short stature ===
- SH6
  Players in this class have short stature caused by achondroplasia or other genetic conditions.

== Competitions ==
BWF organizes the bi-annual Para-badminton World Championships and continental championships, originally with the World championships in odd numbered years, and continental championships in even numbered years, before switching in 2022. Para-badminton also features in other multi sports events like the Asian Para Games and ASEAN Para Games.

Para-badminton was successfully introduced at the 2020 Paralympic Games in Tokyo with 14 events, becoming the third racket sport to be included in the games after wheelchair tennis and table tennis. At the 2024 Summer Paralympics in Paris, two further events were added to the schedule for a total of 16.
