= Badminton at the 2024 Summer Paralympics – Men's singles SU5 =

Badminton competition

Men's singles SU5 at the XVII Paralympic Games
- Venue: Arena Porte de La Chapelle, Paris
- Dates: 29 August 2024 – 2 September 2024
- Competitors: 8 from 6 nations

Medalists
1st place, gold medalist(s)		Cheah Liek Hou	Malaysia
2nd place, silver medalist(s)		Suryo Nugroho	Indonesia
3rd place, bronze medalist(s)		Dheva Anrimusthi	Indonesia

The men's singles SU5 tournament at the 2024 Summer Paralympics in France are currently taking place between 29 August and 2 September 2024 at Arena Porte de La Chapelle.

== Classification ==
- SU5
  Players have impairment of the upper limbs.

== Seeds ==
These were the seeds for this event:

1. Cheah Liek Hou (MAS) (champion, gold medalist)
2. Fang Jen-yu (TPE) (group stage)

== Group stage ==
The draw of the group stage revealed on 24 August 2024. The group stage will be played from 29 to 31 August. The top two winners of each group advanced to the knockout rounds.

=== Group A ===
Pos	Team	Pld	W	L	GF	GA	GD	PF	PA	PD	Pts	Qualification
1	Cheah Liek Hou (MAS)	3	3	0	6	0	+6	126	65	+61	3	Semi-finals
2	Suryo Nugroho (INA)	3	2	1	4	2	+2	107	91	+16	2	Semi-finals
3	Méril Loquette (FRA) (H)	3	1	2	2	5	−3	109	138	−29	1	
4	Bartłomiej Mróz (POL)	3	0	3	1	6	−5	93	141	−48	0	

First match(es) will be played: 29 August 2024. Source: COJOP2024
(H) Host

Date	Time	Player 1	Score	Player 2	Set 1	Set 2	Set 3	Report
Aug 29	9:55	Suryo Nugroho (Indonesia)	2–0	(France) Méril Loquette	21–13	21–13		Report
Aug 29	10:03	Cheah Liek Hou (Malaysia)	2–0	(Poland) Bartłomiej Mróz	21–10	21–6		Report
Aug 30	20:34	Bartłomiej Mróz (Poland)	0–2	(Indonesia) Suryo Nugroho	13–21	10–21		Report
Aug 30	22:58	Cheah Liek Hou (Malaysia)	2–0	(France) Méril Loquette	21–10	21–16		Report
Aug 31	21:03	Bartłomiej Mróz (Poland)	1–2	(France) Méril Loquette	21–15	19–21	14–21	Report
Aug 31	21:19	Cheah Liek Hou (Malaysia)	2–0	(Indonesia) Suryo Nugroho	21–10	21–13		Report

=== Group B ===
Pos	Team	Pld	W	L	GF	GA	GD	PF	PA	PD	Pts	Qualification
1	Muhammad Fareez Anuar (MAS)	3	3	0	6	2	+4	157	146	+11	3	Semi-finals
2	Dheva Anrimusthi (INA)	3	2	1	5	2	+3	143	120	+23	2	Semi-finals
3	Taiyo Imai (JPN)	3	1	2	3	5	−2	144	152	−8	1	
4	Fang Jen-yu (TPE)	3	0	3	1	6	−5	115	141	−26	0	

First match(es) will be played: 29 August 2024. Source: COJOP2024

Date	Time	Player 1	Score	Player 2	Set 1	Set 2	Set 3	Report
Aug 29	9:57	Fang Jen-yu (Chinese Taipei)	0–2	(Malaysia) Muhammad Fareez Anuar	14–21	18–21		Report
Aug 29	12:26	Taiyo Imai (Japan)	0–2	(Indonesia) Dheva Anrimusthi	18–21	14–21		Report
Aug 30	13:03	Fang Jen-yu (Chinese Taipei)	1–2	(Japan) Taiyo Imai	21–15	11–21	19–21	Report
Aug 30	16:03	Muhammad Fareez Anuar (Malaysia)	2–1	(Indonesia) Dheva Anrimusthi	14–21	21–19	21–19	Report
Aug 31	16:03	Fang Jen-yu (Chinese Taipei)	0–2	(Indonesia) Dheva Anrimusthi	14–21	18–21		Report
Aug 31	16:05	Muhammad Fareez Anuar (Malaysia)	2–1	(Japan) Taiyo Imai	17–21	21–17	21–17	Report

== Finals ==
The knockout stage will be played from 1 to 2 September.

Semi-finals
A1	Cheah Liek Hou (MAS)	21	21
B2	Dheva Anrimusthi (INA)	17	17
A2	Suryo Nugroho (INA)	21	14	21
B1	Muhammad Fareez Anuar (MAS)	12	21	6

Gold medal match
A1	Cheah Liek Hou (MAS) (gold)	21	21
A2	Suryo Nugroho (INA) (silver)	13	15
Bronze medal match
B2	Dheva Anrimusthi (INA) (bronze)	17	21	21
B1	Muhammad Fareez Anuar (MAS)	21	19	12
