= 2022 BWF Para-Badminton World Championships – Men's singles SU5 =

Men's singles SU5 at the 2022 BWF Para-Badminton World Championships
- Venue: Yoyogi National Gymnasium
- Location: Tokyo, Japan
- Dates: 1–6 November

Medalists
gold medal	Cheah Liek Hou	Malaysia
silver medal	Dheva Anrimusthi	Indonesia
bronze medal	Suryo Nugroho	Indonesia
bronze medal	Taiyo Imai	Japan

The men's singles SU5 tournament of the 2022 BWF Para-Badminton World Championships took place from 1 to 6 November.

== Seeds ==
1. (Malaysia) Cheah Liek Hou (champion)
2. (Chinese Taipei) Fang Jen-yu (quarter-finals)
3. (Japan) Taiyo Imai (semi-finals)
4. (France) Méril Loquette (quarter-finals)
5. (Poland) Bartłomiej Mróz (first round)
6. (Indonesia) Suryo Nugroho (semi-finals)
7. (Indonesia) Dheva Anrimusthi (final)
8. (India) Chirag Baretha (first round)

== Group stage ==
All times are local (UTC+9).

=== Group A ===
Pos	Team	Pld	W	L	GF	GA	GD	PF	PA	PD	Pts	Qualification
1	(Malaysia) Cheah Liek Hou [1]	2	2	0	4	0	+4	84	42	+42	2	Advance to Knock-out stage
2	(Wales) David Jack Wilson	2	1	1	2	2	0	72	53	+19	1	Advance to Knock-out stage
3	(England) Sean O'Sullivan	2	0	2	0	4	−4	23	84	−61	0	

Source: TS

Date		Score		Set 1	Set 2	Set 3
1 Nov; 12:30	David Jack Wilson (Wales)	2–0	(England) Sean O'Sullivan	21–6	21–5	
2 Nov; 10:10	Cheah Liek Hou (Malaysia)	2–0	(Wales) David Jack Wilson	21–11	21–19	
2 Nov; 16:35	Cheah Liek Hou (Malaysia)	2–0	(England) Sean O'Sullivan	21–6	21–6	

=== Group B ===
Pos	Team	Pld	W	L	GF	GA	GD	PF	PA	PD	Pts	Qualification
1	(Chinese Taipei) Fang Jen-yu [2]	2	2	0	4	0	+4	84	29	+55	2	Advance to Knock-out stage
2	(Malaysia) Mohamad Faris Ahmad Azri	2	1	1	2	2	0	62	60	+2	1	Advance to Knock-out stage
3	(Egypt) Mohamed Shaaban Abdelgawa Ismail	2	0	2	0	4	−4	27	84	−57	0	

Source: TS

Date		Score		Set 1	Set 2	Set 3
1 Nov; 12:30	Mohamad Faris Ahmad Azri (Malaysia)	2–0	(Egypt) Mohamed Shaaban Abdelgawa Ismail	21–9	21–9	
2 Nov; 10:10	Fang Jen-yu (Chinese Taipei)	2–0	(Malaysia) Mohamad Faris Ahmad Azri	21–11	21–9	
2 Nov; 16:35	Fang Jen-yu (Chinese Taipei)	2–0	(Egypt) Mohamed Shaaban Abdelgawa Ismail	21–6	21–3	

=== Group C ===
Pos	Team	Pld	W	L	GF	GA	GD	PF	PA	PD	Pts	Qualification
1	(Japan) Taiyo Imai [3/4] (H)	2	2	0	4	0	+4	84	28	+56	2	Advance to Knock-out stage
2	(France) Abdoullah Ait Bella	2	1	1	2	2	0	62	81	−19	1	Advance to Knock-out stage
3	(South Korea) Lee Jeong-soo	2	0	2	0	4	−4	50	87	−37	0	

Source: TS
(H) Host

Date		Score		Set 1	Set 2	Set 3
1 Nov; 12:30	Abdoullah Ait Bella (France)	2–0	(South Korea) Lee Jeong-soo	24–22	21–17	
2 Nov; 10:45	Taiyo Imai (Japan)	2–0	(South Korea) Lee Jeong-soo	21–5	21–6	
2 Nov; 16:35	Taiyo Imai (Japan)	2–0	(France) Abdoullah Ait Bella	21–7	21–10	

=== Group D ===
Pos	Team	Pld	W	L	GF	GA	GD	PF	PA	PD	Pts	Qualification
1	(France) Méril Loquette [3/4]	2	2	0	4	0	+4	87	41	+46	2	Advance to Knock-out stage
2	(New Zealand) Thomas Denesfield Slade	2	1	1	2	2	0	74	57	+17	1	Advance to Knock-out stage
3	(Kuwait) Rashed al-Qallaf	2	0	2	0	4	−4	21	84	−63	0	

Source: TS

Date		Score		Set 1	Set 2	Set 3
1 Nov; 12:30	Thomas Denesfield Slade (New Zealand)	2–0	(Kuwait) Rashed al-Qallaf	21–6	21–6	
2 Nov; 10:45	Méril Loquette (France)	2–0	(Kuwait) Rashed al-Qallaf	21–4	21–5	
2 Nov; 16:35	Méril Loquette (France)	2–0	(New Zealand) Thomas Denesfield Slade	24–22	21–10	

=== Group E ===
Pos	Team	Pld	W	L	GF	GA	GD	PF	PA	PD	Pts	Qualification
1	(India) Chirag Baretha [5/8]	2	2	0	4	0	+4	84	35	+49	2	Advance to Knock-out stage
2	(Netherlands) Joshua Donker	2	1	1	2	2	0	59	61	−2	1	Advance to Knock-out stage
3	(Egypt) Ahmed Eldakrory	2	0	2	0	4	−4	37	84	−47	0	

Source: TS

Date		Score		Set 1	Set 2	Set 3
1 Nov; 12:30	Joshua Donker (Netherlands)	2–0	(Egypt) Ahmed Eldakrory	21–8	21–11	
2 Nov; 10:45	Chirag Baretha (India)	2–0	(Egypt) Ahmed Eldakrory	21–8	21–10	
2 Nov; 16:35	Chirag Baretha (India)	2–0	(Netherlands) Joshua Donker	21–13	21–4	

=== Group F ===
Pos	Team	Pld	W	L	GF	GA	GD	PF	PA	PD	Pts	Qualification
1	(Turkey) İlker Tuzcu	3	3	0	6	1	+5	143	100	+43	3	Advance to Knock-out stage
2	(Poland) Bartłomiej Mróz [5/8]	3	2	1	5	2	+3	142	87	+55	2	Advance to Knock-out stage
3	(Singapore) Tay Wei Ming	3	1	2	2	4	−2	90	99	−9	1	
4	(Colombia) Jean Paul Ortiz Vargas	3	0	3	0	6	−6	37	126	−89	0	

Source: TS

Date		Score		Set 1	Set 2	Set 3
1 Nov; 12:30	İlker Tuzcu (Turkey)	2–0	(Singapore) Tay Wei Ming	22–20	21–9	
1 Nov; 13:05	Bartłomiej Mróz (Poland)	2–0	(Colombia) Jean Paul Ortiz Vargas	21–5	21–5	
2 Nov; 10:45	İlker Tuzcu (Turkey)	2–1	(Poland) Bartłomiej Mróz	16–21	21–19	21–18
2 Nov; 10:45	Tay Wei Ming (Singapore)	2–0	(Colombia) Jean Paul Ortiz Vargas	21–8	21–6	
2 Nov; 17:10	İlker Tuzcu (Turkey)	2–0	(Colombia) Jean Paul Ortiz Vargas	21–7	21–6	
2 Nov; 18:20	Bartłomiej Mróz (Poland)	2–0	(Singapore) Tay Wei Ming	21–12	21–7	

=== Group G ===
Pos	Team	Pld	W	L	GF	GA	GD	PF	PA	PD	Pts	Qualification
1	(Indonesia) Suryo Nugroho [5/8]	3	3	0	6	1	+5	138	102	+36	3	Advance to Knock-out stage
2	(Chinese Taipei) Pu Gui-yu	3	2	1	5	3	+2	147	131	+16	2	Advance to Knock-out stage
3	(India) Hardik Makkar	3	1	2	2	5	−3	108	134	−26	1	
4	(South Korea) Kim Gi-yeon	3	0	3	2	6	−4	130	156	−26	0	

Source: TS

Date		Score		Set 1	Set 2	Set 3
1 Nov; 13:05	Pu Gui-yu (Chinese Taipei)	2–0	(India) Hardik Makkar	21–13	21–12	
1 Nov; 13:05	Suryo Nugroho (Indonesia)	2–0	(South Korea) Kim Gi-yeon	21–13	21–15	
2 Nov; 10:45	Suryo Nugroho (Indonesia)	2–1	(Chinese Taipei) Pu Gui-yu	12–21	21–12	21–16
2 Nov; 11:20	Hardik Makkar (India)	2–1	(South Korea) Kim Gi-yeon	16–21	21–11	21–18
2 Nov; 17:10	Suryo Nugroho (Indonesia)	2–0	(India) Hardik Makkar	21–10	21–15	
2 Nov; 17:45	Pu Gui-yu (Chinese Taipei)	2–1	(South Korea) Kim Gi-yeon	21–17	14–21	21–14

=== Group H ===
Pos	Team	Pld	W	L	GF	GA	GD	PF	PA	PD	Pts	Qualification
1	(Indonesia) Dheva Anrimusthi [5/8]	3	3	0	6	0	+6	126	58	+68	3	Advance to Knock-out stage
2	(India) Ruthick Ragupathi	3	2	1	4	2	+2	101	96	+5	2	Advance to Knock-out stage
3	(Canada) Rishav Sharma	3	1	2	2	4	−2	93	111	−18	1	
4	(Venezuela) Kleiber Palacios	3	0	3	0	6	−6	71	126	−55	0	

Source: TS

Date		Score		Set 1	Set 2	Set 3
1 Nov; 13:05	Ruthick Ragupathi (India)	2–0	(Canada) Rishav Sharma	21–13	21–16	
1 Nov; 13:05	Dheva Anrimusthi (Indonesia)	2–0	(Venezuela) Kleiber Palacios	21–7	21–12	
2 Nov; 11:20	Dheva Anrimusthi (Indonesia)	2–0	(India) Ruthick Ragupathi	21–10	21–7	
2 Nov; 11:20	Rishav Sharma (Canada)	2–0	(Venezuela) Kleiber Palacios	21–10	21–17	
2 Nov; 17:45	Dheva Anrimusthi (Indonesia)	2–0	(Canada) Rishav Sharma	21–8	21–14	
2 Nov; 17:45	Ruthick Ragupathi (India)	2–0	(Venezuela) Kleiber Palacios	21–15	21–10	

== Knock-out stage ==
First Round
1	(Malaysia) Cheah Liek Hou	21	21
(India) Ruthick Ragupathi	16	8
5/8	(India) Chirag Baretha	17	12
(Chinese Taipei) Pu Gui-yu	21	21
3/4	(France) Méril Loquette	21	20	21
5/8	(Poland) Bartłomiej Mróz	17	22	18
5/8	(Indonesia) Suryo Nugroho	21	21
(Wales) David Jack Wilson	7	12
(Netherlands) Joshua Donker	7	15
(Turkey) İlker Tuzcu	21	21
(New Zealand) Thomas Denesfield Slade	5	5
3/4	(Japan) Taiyo Imai	21	21
(Malaysia) Mohamad Faris Ahmad Azri	16	10
5/8	(Indonesia) Dheva Anrimusthi	21	21
(France) Abdoullah Ait Bella	8	15
2	(Chinese Taipei) Fang Jen-yu	21	21

Quarter-finals
1	(Malaysia) Cheah Liek Hou	21	20	21
(Chinese Taipei) Pu Gui-yu	15	22	13
3/4	(France) Méril Loquette	17	14
5/8	(Indonesia) Suryo Nugroho	21	21
(Turkey) İlker Tuzcu	17	15
3/4	(Japan) Taiyo Imai	21	21
5/8	(Indonesia) Dheva Anrimusthi	18	21	21
2	(Chinese Taipei) Fang Jen-yu	21	16	11

Semi-finals
1	(Malaysia) Cheah Liek Hou	21	21
5/8	(Indonesia) Suryo Nugroho	13	19
3/4	(Japan) Taiyo Imai	13	12
5/8	(Indonesia) Dheva Anrimusthi	21	21

Final
1	(Malaysia) Cheah Liek Hou	21	21
5/8	(Indonesia) Dheva Anrimusthi	14	12
