= Badminton at the 2022 Asian Para Games – Men's singles SU5 =

Badminton tournament

Badminton's men's singles SU5 at the 2022 Asian Para Games
- Venue: Binjiang Gymnasium, Hangzhou
- Dates: 20 – 27 August 2023
- Competitors: 26 from 14 nations

Medalists
gold medal	Dheva Anrimusthi	Indonesia
silver medal	Cheah Liek Hou	Malaysia
bronze medal	Fang Jen-yu	Chinese Taipei
bronze medal	Suryo Nugroho	Indonesia

The men's singles SU5 badminton tournament at the 2022 Asian Para Games is playing from 20 to 27 October 2023 in Binjiang Gymnasium, Hangzhou. A total of 26 players competed at the tournament, eight of whom was seeded.

== Competition schedule ==
Plays are taking place between 20 and 27 October 2023.

GS	Group stage	R16	Round of 16	¼	Quarterfinals	½	Semifinals	F	Final

Events	Fri 20	Sat 21	Sun 22	Mon 23	Tue 24	Wed 25	Thu 26	Fri 27
Men's singles SU5	GS	GS		GS	R16	¼	½	F

== Seeds ==
The following players were seeded:

1. Cheah Liek Hou (MAS) (final; silver medalist)
2. Dheva Anrimusthi (INA) (champion; gold medalist)
3. Fang Jen-yu (TPE) (semi-finals; bronze medalist)
4. Suryo Nugroho (INA) (semi-finals; bronze medalist)
5. Ruthick Ragupathi (IND) (round of 16)
6. Chirag Baretha (IND) (round of 16)
7. Pu Gui-yu (TPE) (quarter-finals)
8. Taiyo Imai (JPN) (quarter-finals)

== Group stage ==
=== Group A ===
Pos	Team	Pld	W	L	GF	GA	GD	PF	PA	PD	Qualification
1	Cheah Liek Hou (MAS) [1]	2	2	0	4	0	+4	84	41	+43	Qualification to elimination stage
2	Shi Shengzhuo (CHN) (H)	2	1	1	2	2	0	59	63	−4	Qualification to elimination stage
3	Antonio Dela Cruz (PHI)	2	0	2	0	4	−4	45	84	−39	

Source: Group A – standings
(H) Host

Date		Score		Game 1	Game 2	Game 3
20 Oct	Antonio Dela Cruz (Philippines)	0–2	(China) Shi Shengzhuo	12–21	9–21	
21 Oct	Cheah Liek Hou (Malaysia)	2–0	(China) Shi Shengzhuo	21–10	21–7	
Oct	Cheah Liek Hou (Malaysia)	2–0	(Philippines) Antonio Dela Cruz	21–15	21–9	

=== Group B ===
Pos	Team	Pld	W	L	GF	GA	GD	PF	PA	PD	Qualification
1	Hardik Makkar (IND)	2	1	1	2	2	0	63	59	+4	Qualification to elimination stage
2	Dheva Anrimusthi (INA) [2]	2	2	0	4	0	+4	84	41	+43	Qualification to elimination stage
3	Liu Shuaicheng (CHN) (H)	2	0	2	0	4	−4	37	84	−47	

Source: Group B – standings
(H) Host

Date		Score		Game 1	Game 2	Game 3
20 Oct	Hardik Makkar (India)	2–0	(China) Liu Shuaicheng	21–6	21–11	
21 Oct	Dheva Anrimusthi (Indonesia)	2–0	(India) Hardik Makkar	21–12	21–9	
23 Oct	Dheva Anrimusthi (Indonesia)	2–0	(China) Liu Shuaicheng	21–6	21–14	

=== Group C ===
Pos	Team	Pld	W	L	GF	GA	GD	PF	PA	PD	Qualification
1	Fang Jen-yu (TPE) [3/4]	2	2	0	4	0	+4	84	30	+54	Qualification to elimination stage
2	Lee Jeong-soo (KOR)	2	1	1	2	2	0	57	64	−7	Qualification to elimination stage
3	Zia Ullah (PAK)	2	0	2	0	4	−4	37	84	−47	

Source: Group C – standings

Date		Score		Game 1	Game 2	Game 3
20 Oct	Zia Ullah (Pakistan)	0–2	(South Korea) Lee Jeong-soo	8–21	14–21	
21 Oct	Fang Jen-yu (Chinese Taipei)	2–0	(South Korea) Lee Jeong-soo	21–5	21–10	
23 Oct	Fang Jen-yu (Chinese Taipei)	2–0	(Pakistan) Zia Ullah	21–7	21–8	

=== Group D ===
Pos	Team	Pld	W	L	GF	GA	GD	PF	PA	PD	Qualification
1	Suryo Nugroho (INA) [3/4]	2	2	0	4	0	+4	84	45	+39	Qualification to elimination stage
2	Phạm Văn Tới (VIE)	2	1	1	2	3	−1	91	89	+2	Qualification to elimination stage
3	Nattaphon Thaweesap (THA)	2	0	2	1	4	−3	67	108	−41	

Source: Group D – standings

Date		Score		Game 1	Game 2	Game 3
20 Oct	Phạm Văn Tới (Vietnam)	2–1	(Thailand) Nattaphon Thaweesap	21–8	24–26	21–13
21 Oct	Suryo Nugroho (Indonesia)	2–0	(Vietnam) Phạm Văn Tối	21–13	21–12	
23 Oct	Suryo Nugroho (Indonesia)	2–0	(Thailand) Nattaphon Thaweesap	21–10	21–10	

=== Group E ===
Pos	Team	Pld	W	L	GF	GA	GD	PF	PA	PD	Qualification
1	Li Mingpan (CHN) (H)	2	2	0	4	0	+4	84	55	+29	Qualification to elimination stage
2	Ruthick Ragupathi (IND) [5/8]	2	1	1	2	2	0	72	71	+1	Qualification to elimination stage
3	Kim Gi-yeon (KOR)	2	0	2	0	4	−4	54	84	−30	

Source: Group E – standings
(H) Host

Date		Score		Game 1	Game 2	Game 3
20 Oct	Kim Gi-yeon (South Korea)	0–2	(China) Li Mingpan	13–21	12–21	
21 Oct	Ruthick Ragupathi (India)	2–0	(South Korea) Kim Gi-yeon	21–12	21–17	
23 Oct	Ruthick Ragupathi (India)	0–2	(China) Li Mingpan	14–21	16–21	

=== Group F ===
Pos	Team	Pld	W	L	GF	GA	GD	PF	PA	PD	Qualification
1	Muhammad Fareez Anuar (MAS)	2	2	0	4	1	+3	97	80	+17	Qualification to elimination stage
2	Chirag Baretha (IND) [5/8]	2	1	1	3	2	+1	94	91	+3	Qualification to elimination stage
3	Tay Wei Ming (SGP)	2	0	2	0	4	−4	64	84	−20	

Source: Group F – standings

Date		Score		Game 1	Game 2	Game 3
20 Oct	Tay Wei Ming (Singapore)	0–2	(Malaysia) Muhammad Fareez Anuar	12–21	16–21	
21 Oct	Chirag Baretha (India)	2–0	(Singapore) Tay Wei Ming	21–17	21–19	
23 Oct	Chirag Baretha (India)	1–2	(Malaysia) Muhammad Fareez Anuar	21–13	15–21	16–21

=== Group G ===
Pos	Team	Pld	W	L	GF	GA	GD	PF	PA	PD	Qualification
1	Pu Gui-yu (TPE) [5/8]	2	2	0	4	1	+3	99	61	+38	Qualification to elimination stage
2	Oddie Listyanto (INA)	2	1	1	3	2	+1	94	68	+26	Qualification to elimination stage
3	Law Ka Fung (HKG)	2	0	2	0	4	−4	20	84	−64	
4	Hem Gurung (NEP) (Z)	0	0	0	0	0	0	0	0	0	

Source: Group G – standings
(Z) Retired after two matches.

Date		Score		Game 1	Game 2	Game 3
20 Oct	Pu Gui-yu (Chinese Taipei)	2–0	(Hong Kong) Law Ka Fung	21–5	21–4	
20 Oct	Oddie Listyanto (Indonesia)	~~2–0~~	(Nepal) Hem Gurung	~~21–8~~	~~21–10~~	
21 Oct	Pu Gui-yu (Chinese Taipei)	2–1	(Indonesia) Oddie Listyanto	21–16	15–21	21–15
21 Oct	Hem Gurung (Nepal)	~~2–0~~	(Hong Kong) Law Ka Fung	~~21–10~~	~~21–13~~	
23 Oct	Pu Gui-yu (Chinese Taipei)	w/o	(Nepal) Hem Gurung	Walkover		
23 Oct	Oddie Listyanto (Indonesia)	2–0	(Hong Kong) Law Ka Fung	21–5	21–6	

=== Group H ===
Pos	Team	Pld	W	L	GF	GA	GD	PF	PA	PD	Qualification
1	Taiyo Imai (JPN) [5/8]	3	3	0	6	0	+6	126	66	+60	Qualification to elimination stage
2	Mohamad Faris Ahmad Azri (MAS)	3	2	1	4	2	+2	106	87	+19	Qualification to elimination stage
3	Pricha Somsiri (THA)	3	1	2	2	4	−2	87	121	−34	
4	Bùi Minh Hải (VIE)	3	0	3	0	6	−6	82	127	−45	

Source: Group H – standings

Date		Score		Game 1	Game 2	Game 3
20 Oct	Taiyo Imai (Japan)	2–0	(Thailand) Pricha Somsiri	21–10	21–11	
20 Oct	Mohamad Faris Ahmad Azri (Malaysia)	2–0	(Vietnam) Bùi Minh Hải	21–7	21–15	
21 Oct	Taiyo Imai (Japan)	2–0	(Malaysia) Mohamad Faris Ahmad Azri	21–14	21–8	
21 Oct	Bùi Minh Hải (Vietnam)	0–2	(Thailand) Pricha Somsiri	17–21	20–22	
23 Oct	Taiyo Imai (Japan)	2–0	(Vietnam) Bùi Minh Hải	21–13	21–10	
23 Oct	Mohamad Faris Ahmad Azri (Malaysia)	2–0	(Thailand) Pricha Somsiri	21–12	21–11	

== Elimination round ==
Top two ranked in each group qualified to the elimination round, the draw will be decided after the previous round finished.

Round of 16
1	Cheah Liek Hou (MAS)	21	21
Phạm Văn Tới (VIE)	9	7
5/8	Taiyo Imai (JPN)	21	21
5/8	Chirag Baretha (IND)	19	13
3/4	Fang Jen-yu (TPE)	21	21
Hardik Makkar (IND)	15	9
Muhammad Fareez Anuar (MAS)	17	21	21
5/8	Ruthick Ragupathi (IND)	21	10	17
Mohamad Faris Ahmad Azri (MAS)	10	15
Li Mingpan (CHN)	21	21
Lee Jeong-soo (KOR)	11	7
3/4	Suryo Nugroho (INA)	21	21
Shi Shengzhuo (CHN)	10	15
5/8	Pu Gui-yu (TPE)	21	21
Oddie Listyanto (INA)	11	11
2	Dheva Anrimusthi (INA)	21	21

Quarter-finals
1	Cheah Liek Hou (MAS)	21	18	21
5/8	Taiyo Imai (JPN)	17	21	16
3/4	Fang Jen-yu (TPE)	21	21
Muhammad Fareez Anuar (MAS)	11	7
Li Mingpan (CHN)	13	14
3/4	Suryo Nugroho (INA)	21	21
5/8	Pu Gui-yu (TPE)	21	16	19
2	Dheva Anrimusthi (INA)	19	21	21

Semi-finals
1	Cheah Liek Hou (MAS)	21	21
3/4	Fang Jen-yu (TPE)	7	9
3/4	Suryo Nugroho (INA)	11	10
2	Dheva Anrimusthi (INA)	21	21

Final
1	Cheah Liek Hou (MAS)	21	19	17
2	Dheva Anrimusthi (INA)	18	21	21
