= 2022 BWF Para-Badminton World Championships – Men's doubles SU5 =

Men's doubles SU5 at the 2022 BWF Para-Badminton World Championships
- Venue: Yoyogi National Gymnasium
- Location: Tokyo, Japan
- Dates: 1–6 November

Medalists
gold medal	Dheva Anrimusthi; Hafizh Briliansyah Prawiranegara	Indonesia
silver medal	Cheah Liek Hou; Mohamad Faris Ahmad Azri	Malaysia
bronze medal	Chirag Baretha; Raj Kumar	India
bronze medal	Hardik Makkar; Ruthick Ragupathi	India

The men's doubles SU5 tournament of the 2022 BWF Para-Badminton World Championships took place from 1 to 6 November.

== Seeds ==
1. (Indonesia) Dheva Anrimusthi / Hafizh Briliansyah Prawiranegara (Champion)
2. (India) Chirag Baretha / Raj Kumar (Semi-finals)

=== Group A ===
Pos	Team	Pld	W	L	GF	GA	GD	PF	PA	PD	Pts	Qualification
1	(Indonesia) Dheva Anrimusthi (Indonesia) Hafizh Briliansyah Prawiranegara	3	3	0	6	0	+6	126	64	+62	3	Advance to semi-finals
2	(India) Hardik Makkar (India) Ruthick Ragupathi	3	2	1	4	3	+1	128	100	+28	2	Advance to semi-finals
3	(Chinese Taipei) Pu Gui-yu (Chinese Taipei) Yeh En-chuan	3	1	2	3	4	−1	121	118	+3	1	
4	(Kuwait) Rashed al-Qallaf (Egypt) Ahmed Eldakrory	3	0	3	0	6	−6	33	126	−93	0	

Source: TS

Date		Score		Set 1	Set 2	Set 3
1 Nov 16:35	Hardik Makkar (India); Ruthick Ragupathi (India)	2–0	(Kuwait) Rashed al-Qallaf (Egypt) Ahmed Eldakrory	21–2	21–0	
1 Nov 16:35	Dheva Anrimusthi (Indonesia); Hafizh B. Prawiranegara (Indonesia)	2–0	(Chinese Taipei) Pu Gui-yu (Chinese Taipei) Yeh En-chuan	21–10	21–13	
3 Nov 15:40	Hardik Makkar (India); Ruthick Ragupathi (India)	2–0	(Chinese Taipei) Pu Gui-yu (Chinese Taipei) Yeh En-chuan	18–21	21–16	21–19
3 Nov 16:20	Dheva Anrimusthi (Indonesia); Hafizh B. Prawiranegara (Indonesia)	2–0	(Kuwait) Rashed al-Qallaf (Egypt) Ahmed Eldakrory	21–8	21–7	
4 Nov 15:45	Dheva Anrimusthi (Indonesia); Hafizh B. Prawiranegara (Indonesia)	2–0	(India) Hardik Makkar (India) Ruthick Ragupathi	21–12	21–14	
4 Nov 15:45	Pu Gui-yu (Chinese Taipei); Yeh En-chuan (Chinese Taipei)	2–0	(Kuwait) Rashed al-Qallaf (Egypt) Ahmed Eldakrory	21–7	21–9	

=== Group B ===
Pos	Team	Pld	W	L	GF	GA	GD	PF	PA	PD	Pts	Qualification
1	(Malaysia) Cheah Liek Hou (Malaysia) Mohamad Faris Ahmad Azri	3	3	0	6	0	+6	128	62	+66	3	Advance to semi-finals
2	(India) Chirag Baretha (India) Raj Kumar	3	2	1	4	2	+2	120	83	+37	2	Advance to semi-finals
3	(South Korea) Kim Gi-yeon (South Korea) Lee Jeong-soo	3	1	2	2	4	−2	95	96	−1	1	
4	(Colombia) Jean Paul Ortiz Vargas (Colombia) Jorge Enrique Moreno	3	0	3	0	6	−6	24	126	−102	0	

Source: TS

Date		Score		Set 1	Set 2	Set 3
1 Nov 16:35	Jean Paul Ortiz Vargas (Colombia); Jorge Enrique Moreno (Colombia)	0–2	(Malaysia) Cheah Liek Hou (Malaysia) Mohamad Faris Ahmad Azri	1–21	2–21	
1 Nov 16:35	Chirag Baretha (India); Raj Kumar (India)	2–0	(South Korea) Kim Gi-yeon (South Korea) Lee Jeong-soo	21–16	21–14	
3 Nov 16:20	Chirag Baretha (India); Raj Kumar (India)	2–0	(Colombia) Jean Paul Ortiz Vargas (Colombia) Jorge Enrique Moreno	21–2	21–7	
3 Nov 16:20	Cheah Liek Hou (Malaysia); Mohamad Faris Ahmad Azri (Malaysia)	2–0	(South Korea) Kim Gi-yeon (South Korea) Lee Jeong-soo	21–7	21–16	
4 Nov 15:45	Chirag Baretha (India); Raj Kumar (India)	0–2	(Malaysia) Cheah Liek Hou (Malaysia) Mohamad Faris Ahmad Azri	15–21	21–23	
4 Nov 15:45	Jean Paul Ortiz Vargas (Colombia); Jorge Enrique Moreno (Colombia)	0–2	(South Korea) Kim Gi-yeon (South Korea) Lee Jeong-soo	4–21	8–21	

== Finals ==
Semi-finals
1	(Indonesia) Dheva Anrimusthi (Indonesia) Hafizh Briliansyah Prawiranegara	21	21
2	(India) Chirag Baretha (India) Raj Kumar	14	15
(India) Hardik Makkar (India) Ruthick Ragupathi	9	15
(Malaysia) Cheah Liek Hou (Malaysia) Mohamad Faris Ahmad Azri	21	21

Final
1	(Indonesia) Dheva Anrimusthi (Indonesia) Hafizh Briliansyah Prawiranegara	21	21
(Malaysia) Cheah Liek Hou (Malaysia) Mohamad Faris Ahmad Azri	13	12
