= Dheva Anrimusthi =

Indonesian para-badminton player

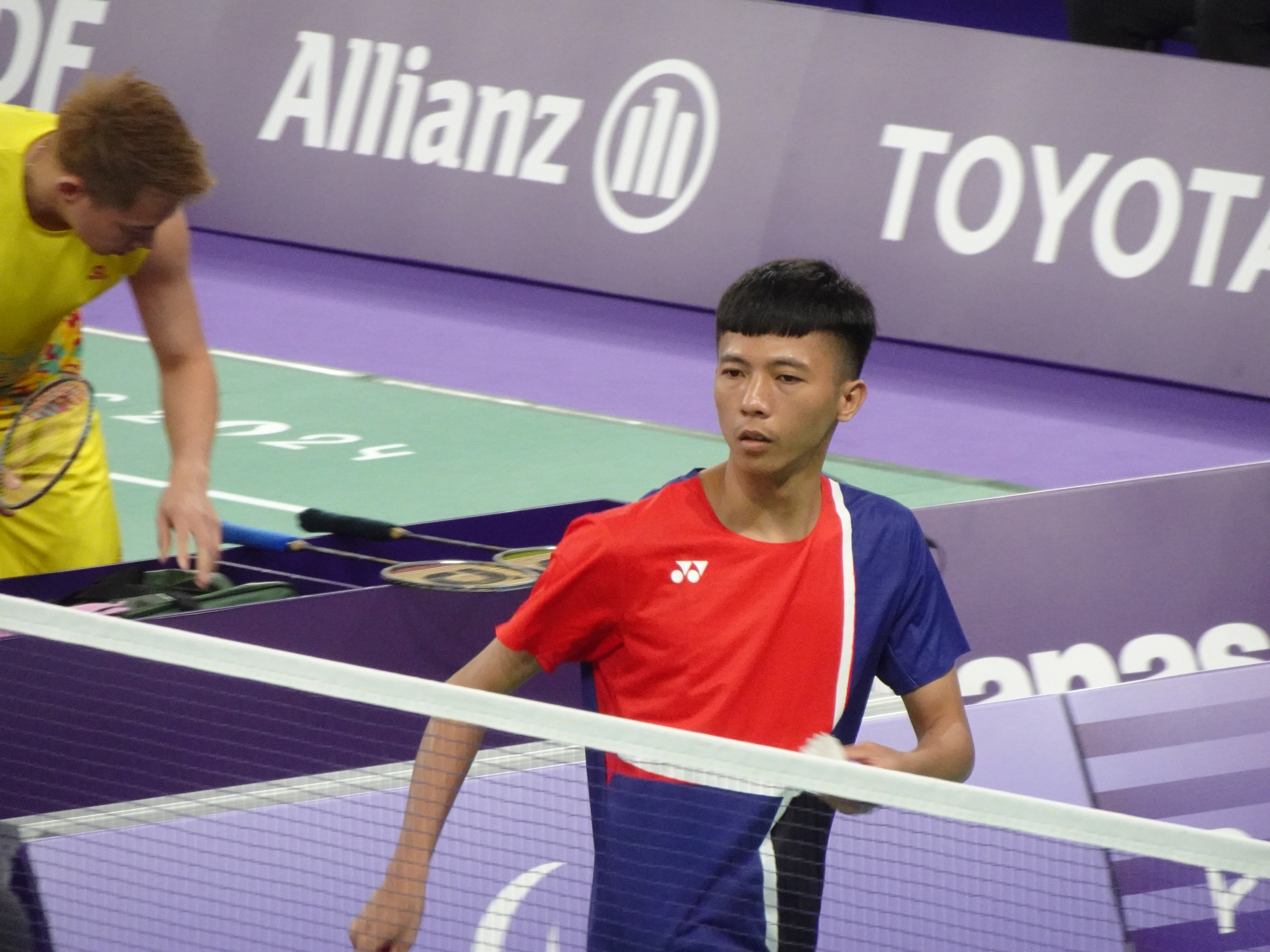

Personal information
- Born: 5 December 1998 (age 27) Kuningan, West Java, Indonesia

Sport
- Country: Indonesia
- Sport: Badminton

Men's singles and doubles SU5
- Highest ranking: 1 (MS 6 April 2019); 1 (MD with Hafizh Briliansyah Prawiranegara 1 April 2019)
- Current ranking: 7 (MS); 1 (MD with Hafizh Briliansyah Prawiranegara) (1 November 2022)
Medal record
Men's para-badminton
Representing Indonesia
Paralympic Games
Silver medal – second place	2020 Tokyo	Men's singles
Bronze medal – third place	2024 Paris	Men's singles
World Championships
Gold medal – first place	2019 Basel	Men's singles
Gold medal – first place	2019 Basel	Men's doubles
Gold medal – first place	2022 Tokyo	Men's doubles
Silver medal – second place	2022 Tokyo	Men's singles
Silver medal – second place	2024 Pattaya	Men's singles
Bronze medal – third place	2024 Pattaya	Men's doubles
Asian Para Games
Gold medal – first place	2018 Jakarta	Men's singles
Gold medal – first place	2018 Jakarta	Men's doubles
Gold medal – first place	2018 Jakarta	Men's team
Gold medal – first place	2022 Hangzhou	Men's singles
Gold medal – first place	2022 Hangzhou	Men's doubles
Asian Championships
Silver medal – second place	2025 Nakhon Ratchasima	Men's singles
ASEAN Para Games
Gold medal – first place	2017 Kuala Lumpur	Men's doubles
Gold medal – first place	2022 Surakarta	Men's doubles
Gold medal – first place	2022 Surakarta	Men's team
Gold medal – first place	2023 Cambodia	Men's singles
Gold medal – first place	2023 Cambodia	Men's doubles
Gold medal – first place	2023 Cambodia	Men's team
Gold medal – first place	2025 Nakhon Ratchasima	Men's singles
Silver medal – second place	2025 Nakhon Ratchasima	Men's doubles
Bronze medal – third place	2017 Kuala Lumpur	Men's singles
Bronze medal – third place	2022 Surakarta	Men's singles
Asian Youth Para Games
Gold medal – first place	2017 Dubai	Boys' doubles
Silver medal – second place	2017 Dubai	Boys' singles

Dheva Anrimusthi (born 5 December 1998) is an Indonesian para-badminton player. He won the silver and bronze medal in the men's singles SU5 event of the 2020 and 2024 Summer Paralympics respectively.

== Early life ==
Anrimusthi had a motorcycle accident as a teenager. His right hand could not straighten or was permanently bent. The condition made him withdraw from the badminton club. When he wanted to train again, several badminton clubs rejected him. The National Paralympic Committee (NPC) invited Anrimusthi to join in 2016. His parents had objected because they did not want their son to be considered disabled. After getting permission, Anrimusthi proved his ability in the championship by winning gold medals in the men's singles, men's doubles, and team.

== Awards and nominations ==
Award	Year	Category	Result	Ref.
Indonesian Sport Awards	2018	Most Favorited Male Para Athlete Pairs (with Hafizh Briliansyah Prawiranegara)	Nominated	
Indonesian Sport Awards	2018	Most Favorited Men's Team Para Athlete (with 2018 Asian Para Games Men's Team Standing)	Won	
Golden Award SIWO PWI	2019	Best Male Para Athlete	Won	
BWF Awards	2019	BWF Best Para Badminton Male Player of the Year	Nominated	

== Achievements ==
=== Paralympic Games ===
Men's singles SU5

Year	Venue	Opponent	Score	Result	Ref
2020	Yoyogi National Gymnasium, Tokyo, Japan	(Malaysia) Cheah Liek Hou	17–21, 15–21	Silver	
2024	Porte de La Chapelle Arena, Paris, France	(Malaysia) Muhammad Fareez Anuar	17–21, 21–19, 21–12	Bronze	

=== World Championships ===
Men's singles SU5

Year	Venue	Opponent	Score	Result	Ref
2019	St. Jakobshalle, Basel, Switzerland	(Indonesia) Suryo Nugroho	21–15, 21–15	Gold	
2022	Yoyogi National Gymnasium, Tokyo, Japan	(Malaysia) Cheah Liek Hou	14–21, 12–21	Silver	
2024	Pattaya Exhibition and Convention Hall, Pattaya, Thailand	(Malaysia) Cheah Liek Hou	15–21, 21–16, 15–21	Silver	

Men's doubles SU5

Year	Venue	Partner	Opponent	Score	Result	Ref
2019	St. Jakobshalle, Basel, Switzerland	(Indonesia) Hafizh Briliansyah Prawiranegara	(China) Shi Shengzhuo (China) He Zhirui	21–18, 21–13	Gold	
2022	Yoyogi National Gymnasium, Tokyo, Japan	(Indonesia) Hafizh Briliansyah Prawiranegara	(Malaysia) Cheah Liek Hou (Malaysia) Muhammad Fareez Anuar	21–13, 21–12	Gold	
2024	Pattaya Exhibition and Convention Hall, Pattaya, Thailand	(Indonesia) Hafizh Briliansyah Prawiranegara	(Malaysia) Cheah Liek Hou (Malaysia) Muhammad Fareez Anuar	11–21, 21–19, 10–21	Bronze	

=== Asian Para Games ===
Men's singles SU5

Year	Venue	Opponent	Score	Result	Ref
2018	Istora Gelora Bung Karno, Jakarta, Indonesia	(Indonesia) Suryo Nugroho	22–20, 21–13	Gold	
2022	Binjiang Gymnasium, Hangzhou, China	(Malaysia) Cheah Liek Hou	18–21, 21–19, 21–17	Gold	

Men's doubles SU5

Year	Venue	Partner	Opponent	Score	Result	Ref
2018	Istora Gelora Bung Karno, Jakarta, Indonesia	(Indonesia) Hafizh Briliansyah Prawiranegara	(Indonesia) Suryo Nugroho (Indonesia) Oddie Kurnia Dwi Listianto Putra	21–9, 21–9	Gold	
2022	Binjiang Gymnasium, Hangzhou, China	(Indonesia) Hafizh Briliansyah Prawiranegara	(India) Chirag Baretha (India) Raj Kumar	21–11, 19–21, 21–11	Gold	

=== Asian Championships ===
Men's singles SU5

Year	Venue	Opponent	Score	Result	Ref
2025	SPADT Convention Center, Nakhon Ratchasima, Thailand	(Malaysia) Cheah Liek Hou	19–21, 21–15, 18–21	Silver	

=== ASEAN Para Games ===
Men's singles SU5

Year	Venue	Opponent	Score	Result	Ref
2017	Axiata Arena, Kuala Lumpur, Malaysia	(Indonesia) Suryo Nugroho	10–21, 10–21	Bronze	
2022	Edutorium Muhammadiyah University of Surakarta, Surakarta, Indonesia	(Malaysia) Cheah Liek Hou	19–21, 12–21	Bronze	
2023	Morodok Techo Badminton Hall, Phnom Penh, Cambodia	(Indonesia) Suryo Nugroho	21–11, 21–9	Gold	

Men's doubles SU5

Year	Venue	Partner	Opponent	Score	Result	Ref
2017	Axiata Arena, Kuala Lumpur, Malaysia	(Indonesia) Hafizh Briliansyah Prawiranegara	(Indonesia) Suryo Nugroho (Indonesia) Oddie Kurnia Dwi Listianto Putra	21–15, 21–12	Gold	
2022	Edutorium Muhammadiyah University of Surakarta, Surakarta, Indonesia	(Indonesia) Hafizh Briliansyah Prawiranegara	(Indonesia) Suryo Nugroho (Indonesia) Oddie Kurnia Dwi Listianto Putra	21–15, 21–12	Gold	
2023	Morodok Techo Badminton Hall, Phnom Penh, Cambodia	(Indonesia) Hafizh Briliansyah Prawiranegara	(Indonesia) Suryo Nugroho (Indonesia) Oddie Kurnia Dwi Listianto Putra	21–12, 21–10	Gold	

=== Asian Youth Para Games ===
Boys' singles SU5

Year	Venue	Opponent	Score	Result	Ref
2017	Al Wasl Club, Dubai, United Arab Emirates	(Japan) Taiyo Imai	21–12, 17–21, 17–21	Silver	

Boys' doubles SU5

Year	Venue	Partner	Opponent	Score	Result	Ref
2017	Al Wasl Club, Dubai, United Arab Emirates	(Indonesia) Arya Sadewa	(China) He Zhirui (China) Li Mingpan	21–15, 21–16	Gold	

=== BWF Para Badminton World Circuit (9 titles, 4 runners-up) ===
The BWF Para Badminton World Circuit – Grade 2, Level 1, 2 and 3 tournaments has been sanctioned by the Badminton World Federation from 2022.

Men's singles SU5

Year	Tournament	Level	Opponent	Score	Result	Ref
2022	Indonesia Para Badminton International	Level 3	(Poland) Bartłomiej Mróz	21–9, 21–14	(gold) Winner	
2023	Spanish Para Badminton International	Level 2	(Malaysia) Cheah Liek Hou	21–11, 17–21, 21–17	(gold) Winner	
2023	Thailand Para Badminton International	Level 2	(Indonesia) Suryo Nugroho	21–17, 21–12	(gold) Winner	
2023	4 Nations Para Badminton International	Level 1	(Malaysia) Cheah Liek Hou	18–21, 10–21	(silver) Runner-up	
2023	Indonesia Para Badminton International	Level 3	(Indonesia) Suryo Nugroho	21–15, 21–14	(gold) Winner	
2023	Western Australia Para Badminton International	Level 2	(Malaysia) Muhammad Fareez Anuar	21–15, 21–12	(gold) Winner	
2024	Bahrain Para Badminton International	Level 2	(Indonesia) Suryo Nugroho	Walkover	(silver) Runner-up	
2024	Bahrain Para Badminton International	Level 1	(Malaysia) Muhammad Fareez Anuar	21–15, 21–17	(gold) Winner	
2025	British & Irish Para Badminton International	Level 1	(Malaysia) Muhammad Fareez Anuar	21–17, 21–18	(gold) Winner	

Men's doubles SU5

Year	Tournament	Level	Partner	Opponent	Score	Result	Ref
2022	Indonesia Para Badminton International	Level 3	(Indonesia) Hafizh Briliansyah Prawiranegara	(Malaysia) Muhammad Fareez Anuar (Malaysia) Mohd Amin Burhanuddin	21–16, 21–10	(gold) Winner	
2023	Indonesia Para Badminton International	Level 3	(Indonesia) Hafizh Briliansyah Prawiranegara	(Indonesia) Suryo Nugroho (Indonesia) Oddie Kurnia Dwi Listianto Putra	21–16, 23–21	(gold) Winner	
2024	Bahrain Para Badminton International	Level 1	(Indonesia) Hafizh Briliansyah Prawiranegara	(Malaysia) Muhammad Fareez Anuar (Malaysia) Cheah Liek Hou	21–13, 17–21, 16–21	(silver) Runner-up	
2025	British & Irish Para Badminton International	Level 1	(Indonesia) Hafizh Briliansyah Prawiranegara	(Malaysia) Muhammad Fareez Anuar (Malaysia) Cheah Liek Hou	14–21, 23–25	(silver) Runner-up	

=== International tournaments (from 2011–2021) (10 titles, 3 runners-up) ===
Men's singles SU5

Year	Tournament	Opponent	Score	Result	Ref
2018	Irish Para-Badminton International	(Malaysia) Cheah Liek Hou	9–21, 19–21	(silver) Runner-up	
2018	Thailand Para-Badminton International	(Indonesia) Suryo Nugroho	21–15, 21–17	(gold) Winner	
2019	Turkish Para-Badminton International	(Indonesia) Suryo Nugroho	21–15, 21–8	(gold) Winner	
2019	Dubai Para-Badminton International	(Malaysia) Cheah Liek Hou	21–19, 18–21, 21–16	(gold) Winner	
2019	Canada Para-Badminton International	(France) Méril Loquette	21–16, 21–16	(gold) Winner	
2019	Irish Para-Badminton International	(Poland) Bartłomiej Mróz	14–21, 21–10, 21–12	(gold) Winner	
2020	Brazil Para-Badminton International	(Malaysia) Cheah Liek Hou	15–21, 21–10, 16–21	(silver) Runner-up	
2021	Dubai Para-Badminton International	(Malaysia) Cheah Liek Hou	21–14, 20–22, 18–21	(silver) Runner-up	

Men's doubles SU5

Year	Tournament	Partner	Opponent	Score	Result
2018	Irish Para-Badminton International	(Indonesia) Hafizh Briliansyah Prawiranegara	(India) Sukant Kadam (Indonesia) Suryo Nugroho	21–9, 21–13	(gold) Winner
2018	Thailand Para-Badminton International	(Indonesia) Hafizh Briliansyah Prawiranegara	(Malaysia) Cheah Liek Hou (Malaysia) Hairol Fozi Saaba	21–19, 21–11	(gold) Winner
2019	Turkish Para-Badminton International	(Indonesia) Suryo Nugroho	(Thailand) Pricha Somsiri (Thailand) Chok-Uthaikul Watcharaphon	21–19, 21–16	(gold) Winner
2019	Dubai Para-Badminton International	(Indonesia) Suryo Nugroho	(India) Raj Kumar (India) Rakesh Pandey	9–21, 21–18, 21–14	(gold) Winner
2019	Irish Para-Badminton International	(Indonesia) Hafizh Briliansyah Prawiranegara	(Malaysia) Cheah Liek Hou (Malaysia) Mohamad Faris Ahmad Azri	21–19, 21–19	(gold) Winner
