= Cheah Liek Hou =

Malaysian para-badminton player (born 1988)

Cheah Liek Hou 谢儮好 KMN
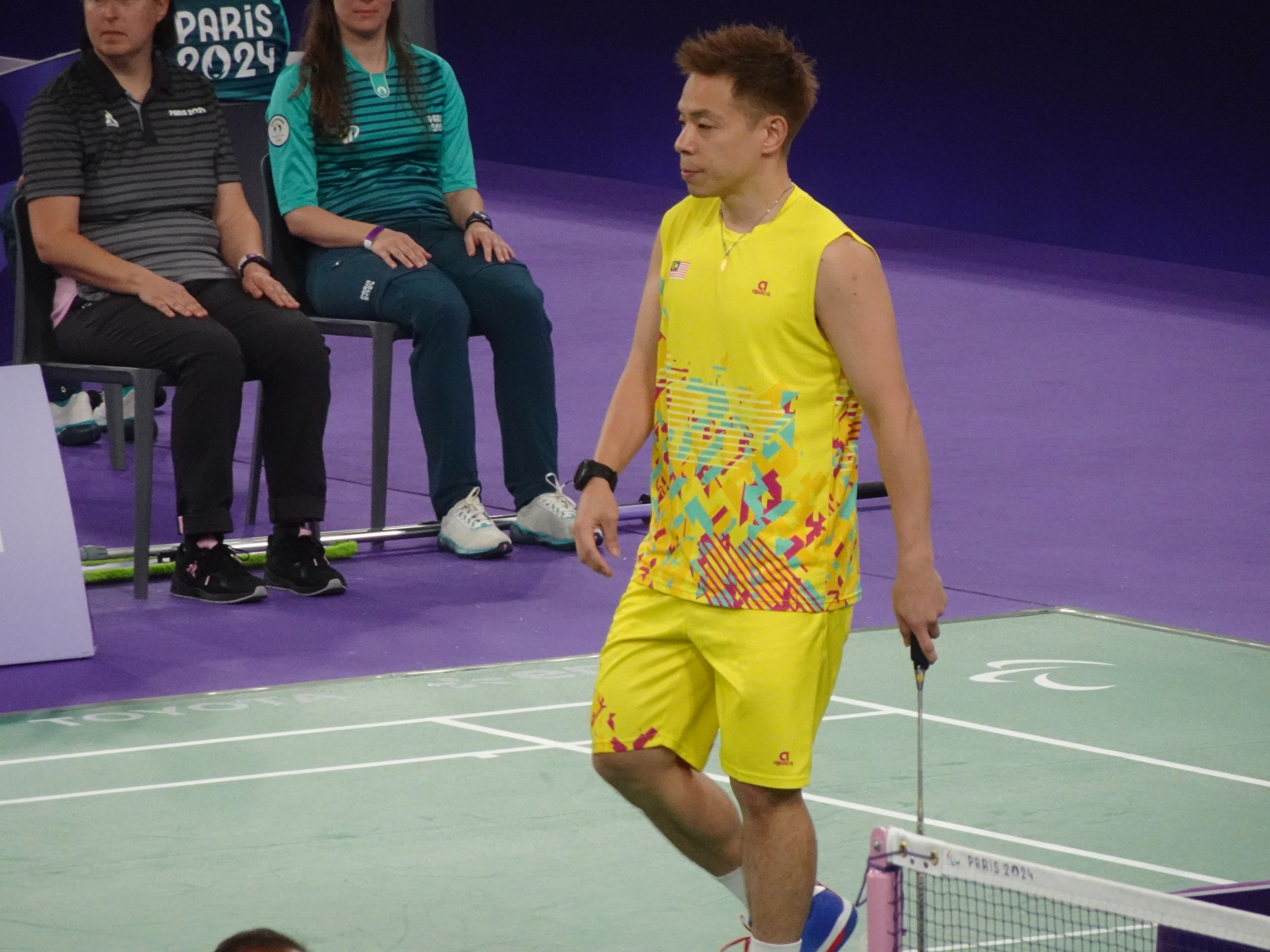
- Cheah at the 2024 Summer Paralympics.

Personal information
- Born: 8 March 1988 (age 38) Kuala Lumpur, Malaysia
- Years active: 2005–present

Sport
- Country: Malaysia
- Sport: Badminton
- Coached by: Rashid Sidek; Nova Armada

Men's singles and doubles SU5
- Career title: 74
- Highest ranking: 1 (MS 1 January 2019); 1 (MD with Hairol Fozi Saaba 1 January 2019)
- Current ranking: 1 (MS); 4 (MD with Mohamad Faris Ahmad Azri) (1 November 2022)
Medal record
Men's para-badminton
Representing Malaysia
Paralympic Games
Gold medal – first place	2020 Tokyo	Men's singles
Gold medal – first place	2024 Paris	Men's singles
World Championships
Gold medal – first place	2005 Hsinchu	Men's singles
Gold medal – first place	2005 Hsinchu	Men's doubles
Gold medal – first place	2005 Hsinchu	Team
Gold medal – first place	2007 Bangkok	Men's singles
Gold medal – first place	2007 Bangkok	Men's doubles
Gold medal – first place	2007 Bangkok	Team
Gold medal – first place	2011 Guatemala City	Men's singles
Gold medal – first place	2011 Guatemala City	Men's doubles
Gold medal – first place	2011 Guatemala City	Team
Gold medal – first place	2013 Dortmund	Men's singles
Gold medal – first place	2013 Dortmund	Men's doubles
Gold medal – first place	2015 Stoke Mandeville	Men's singles
Gold medal – first place	2015 Stoke Mandeville	Men's doubles
Gold medal – first place	2017 Ulsan	Men's singles
Gold medal – first place	2022 Tokyo	Men's singles
Gold medal – first place	2024 Pattaya	Men's singles
Gold medal – first place	2024 Pattaya	Men's doubles
Gold medal – first place	2026 Manama	Men's singles
Gold medal – first place	2026 Manama	Men's doubles
Silver medal – second place	2017 Ulsan	Men's doubles
Silver medal – second place	2022 Tokyo	Men's doubles
Bronze medal – third place	2019 Basel	Men's singles
Bronze medal – third place	2019 Basel	Men's doubles
Asian Para Games
Gold medal – first place	2010 Guangzhou	Men's singles
Gold medal – first place	2010 Guangzhou	Men's doubles
Gold medal – first place	2014 Incheon	Men's singles
Gold medal – first place	2014 Incheon	Men's doubles
Silver medal – second place	2018 Jakarta	Men's team
Silver medal – second place	2022 Hangzhou	Men's singles
Bronze medal – third place	2018 Jakarta	Men's singles
Bronze medal – third place	2018 Jakarta	Men's doubles
Bronze medal – third place	2022 Hangzhou	Men's doubles
Asian Championships
Gold medal – first place	2004 Kuala Lumpur	Men's singles
Gold medal – first place	2004 Kuala Lumpur	Men's doubles
Gold medal – first place	2004 Kuala Lumpur	Men's team
Gold medal – first place	2008 Bangalore	Men's singles
Gold medal – first place	2008 Bangalore	Men's doubles
Gold medal – first place	2012 Yeoju	Men's singles
Gold medal – first place	2012 Yeoju	Men's doubles
Gold medal – first place	2016 Beijing	Men's doubles
Bronze medal – third place	2016 Beijing	Men's singles
ASEAN Para Games
Gold medal – first place	2005 Manila	Men's singles
Gold medal – first place	2008 Nakhon Ratchasima	Men's singles
Gold medal – first place	2008 Nakhon Ratchasima	Men's doubles
Gold medal – first place	2008 Nakhon Ratchasima	Mixed doubles
Gold medal – first place	2009 Kuala Lumpur	Men's singles
Gold medal – first place	2009 Kuala Lumpur	Men's doubles
Gold medal – first place	2009 Kuala Lumpur	Mixed doubles
Gold medal – first place	2011 Surakarta	Men's singles
Gold medal – first place	2011 Surakarta	Men's doubles
Gold medal – first place	2011 Surakarta	Mixed doubles
Gold medal – first place	2015 Singapore	Men's doubles
Gold medal – first place	2017 Kuala Lumpur	Men's singles
Gold medal – first place	2022 Surakarta	Men's singles
Silver medal – second place	2003 Hanoi	Men's singles
Silver medal – second place	2003 Hanoi	Men's team
Silver medal – second place	2005 Manila	Men's doubles
Silver medal – second place	2005 Manila	Men's team
Silver medal – second place	2008 Nakhon Ratchasima	Men's team
Silver medal – second place	2009 Kuala Lumpur	Men's team
Silver medal – second place	2015 Singapore	Men's singles
Silver medal – second place	2015 Singapore	Men's team
Bronze medal – third place	2003 Hanoi	Men's singles
Bronze medal – third place	2017 Kuala Lumpur	Men's doubles
Bronze medal – third place	2022 Surakarta	Men's doubles

Cheah Liek Hou (Chinese: 谢儮好; pinyin: Xiè Lìhǎo; born 8 March 1988) is a Malaysian para-badminton player. He is a two-time Paralympic gold medalist and a 16-time World champion at both SU5 singles and doubles events. He won the gold medal in the men's singles SU5 event at the 2020 and 2024 Summer Paralympics, making him the first Malaysian athlete to win a medal in para-badminton. He is the first-ever Paralympic champion in para-badminton.

== Early life ==
Cheah was born with Erb's palsy, which causes his right hand to have less strength and stability. He took up badminton when he was nine. He later competed against able-bodied badminton players and joined the able-bodied squad when he was 12 years old. He completed his pre-university education in Bukit Jalil Sports School. He competed in both able-bodied and para-badminton tournaments before exclusively competing in the latter upon obtaining his degree.

== Personal life ==
Cheah is married to Dewi Febriana Tan. He has a degree in corporate communications awarded by Universiti Putra Malaysia.

== Achievements ==
=== Paralympic Games ===
==== Men's singles SU5 ====
Year	Venue	Opponent	Score	Result
2020	Yoyogi National Gymnasium, Tokyo, Japan	(Indonesia) Dheva Anrimusthi	21–17, 21–15	Gold
2024	Porte de La Chapelle Arena, Paris, France	(Indonesia) Suryo Nugroho	21–13, 21–15	Gold

=== World Championships ===
==== Men's singles SU5 ====
Year	Venue	Opponent	Score	Result
2005	Hsinchu Municipal Gymnasium, Hsinchu, Taiwan	(Israel) Eyal Bachar	2–0	Gold
2007	Gymnasium 1, Bangkok, Thailand	(Spain) Juan Bretones	21–11, 21–13	Gold
2011	Coliseo Deportivo, Guatemala City, Guatemala	(Turkey) İlker Tuzcu	21–11, 21–19	Gold
2013	Helmut-Körnig-Halle, Dortmund, Germany	(Poland) Bartłomiej Mróz	21–18, 21–13	Gold
2015	Stoke Mandeville Stadium, Stoke Mandeville, England	(Poland) Bartłomiej Mróz	21–16, 21–12	Gold
2017	Dongchun Gymnasium, Ulsan, South Korea	(Indonesia) Suryo Nugroho	19–21, 21–15, 21–18	Gold
2019	St. Jakobshalle, Basel, Switzerland	(Indonesia) Dheva Anrimusthi	13–21, 8–21	Bronze
2022	Yoyogi National Gymnasium, Tokyo, Japan	(Indonesia) Dheva Anrimusthi	21–14, 21–12	Gold
2024	Pattaya Exhibition and Convention Hall, Pattaya, Thailand	(Indonesia) Dheva Anrimusthi	21–15, 16–21, 21–15	Gold
2026	Isa Sports City, Manama, Bahrain	(Chinese Taipei) Fang Jen-yu	21–6, 21–11	Gold

==== Men's doubles SU5 ====
Year	Venue	Partner	Opponent	Score	Result
2005	Hsinchu Municipal Gymnasium, Hsinchu, Taiwan	(Malaysia) Razali Jaafar	(Chinese Taipei) Chang Cheng-cheng (Chinese Taipei) Lee Meng-yuan	2–0	Gold
2007	Gymnasium 1, Bangkok, Thailand	(Malaysia) Suhaili Laiman	(India) Rakesh Pandey (India) Raj Kumar	21–4, 21–10	Gold
2011	Coliseo Deportivo, Guatemala City, Guatemala	(Malaysia) Suhaili Laiman	(Japan) Kohei Obara (Japan) Gen Shogaki	21–14, 20–22, 21–12	Gold
2013	Helmut-Körnig-Halle, Dortmund, Germany	(Malaysia) Suhaili Laiman	(Poland) Bartłomiej Mróz (Turkey) İlker Tuzcu	21–18, 21–17	Gold
2015	Stoke Mandeville Stadium, Stoke Mandeville, England	(Malaysia) Hairol Fozi Saaba	(Poland) Bartłomiej Mróz (Turkey) İlker Tuzcu	18–21, 21–13, 21–16	Gold
2017	Dongchun Gymnasium, Ulsan, South Korea	(Malaysia) Hairol Fozi Saaba	(Indonesia) Suryo Nugroho (Singapore) Tay Wei Ming	21–18, 21–23, 18–21	Silver
2019	St. Jakobshalle, Basel, Switzerland	(Malaysia) Mohamad Faris Ahmad Azri	(Indonesia) Dheva Anrimusthi (Indonesia) Hafizh Briliansyah Prawiranegara	13–21, 9–21	Bronze
2022	Yoyogi National Gymnasium, Tokyo, Japan	(Malaysia) Mohamad Faris Ahmad Azri	(Indonesia) Dheva Anrimusthi (Indonesia) Hafizh Briliansyah Prawiranegara	13–21, 12–21	Silver
2024	Pattaya Exhibition and Convention Hall, Pattaya, Thailand	(Malaysia) Muhammad Fareez Anuar	(India) Chirag Baretha (India) Raj Kumar	21–17, 21–18	Gold
2026	Isa Sports City, Manama, Bahrain	(Malaysia) Mohamad Faris Ahmad Azri	(Chinese Taipei) Fang Jen-yu (Chinese Taipei) Pu Gui-yu	21–11, 21–11	Gold

=== Asian Para Games ===
==== Men's singles SU5 ====
Year	Venue	Opponent	Score	Result
2010	Tianhe Gymnasium, Guangzhou, China	(Indonesia) Suryo Nugroho	21–8, 21–10	Gold
2014	Gyeyang Gymnasium, Incheon, South Korea	(Indonesia) Oddie Listyanto Putra	21–8, 21–11	Gold
2018	Istora Gelora Bung Karno, Jakarta, Indonesia	(Indonesia) Dheva Anrimusthi	21–18, 14–21, 16–21	Silver
2022	Binjiang Gymnasium, Hangzhou, China	(Indonesia) Dheva Anrimusthi	21–18, 19–21, 17–21	Silver

==== Men's doubles SU5 ====
Year	Venue	Partner	Opponent	Score	Result
2010	Tianhe Gymnasium, Guangzhou, China	(Malaysia) Suhaili Laiman	(Indonesia) Dwiyoko (Indonesia) Ryan Yohwari	21–8, 21–7	Gold
2014	Gyeyang Gymnasium, Incheon, South Korea	(Malaysia) Suhaili Laiman	(India) Rakesh Pandey (India) Raj Kumar	11–21, 21–11, 21–13	Gold
2018	Istora Gelora Bung Karno, Jakarta, Indonesia	(Malaysia) Hairol Fozi Saaba	(Indonesia) Oddie Listyanto Putra (Indonesia) Suryo Nugroho	21–16, 18–21, 17–21	Bronze
2022	Binjiang Gymnasium, Hangzhou, China	(Malaysia) Muhammad Fareez Anuar	(Indonesia) Dheva Anrimusthi (Indonesia) Hafizh Briliansyah Prawiranegara	21–19, 15–21, 12–21	Bronze

=== Asian Championships ===
==== Men's singles SU5 ====
Year	Venue	Opponent	Score	Result
2004	Stadium Titiwangsa, Kuala Lumpur, Malaysia	(Hong Kong) Jeffrey Zee	15–2, 15–6	Gold
2008	Raheja Stadium, Bangalore, India			Gold
2012	Yeoju Sports Center, Yeoju, South Korea	(Singapore) Tay Wei Ming	21–18, 21–8	Gold
2016	China Administration of Sport for Persons with Disabilities, Beijing, China	(Indonesia) Suryo Nugroho	13–21, 16–21	Bronze

==== Men's doubles SU5 ====
Year	Venue	Partner	Opponent	Score	Result
2004	Stadium Titiwangsa, Kuala Lumpur, Malaysia	(Malaysia) Razali Jaafar	(Japan) Hironobu Kawabata (Japan) Tetsuo Ura	15–7, 15–6	Gold
2008	Raheja Stadium, Bangalore, India	(Malaysia) Suhaili Laiman			Gold
2012	Yeoju Sports Center, Yeoju, South Korea	(Malaysia) Suhaili Laiman	(Singapore) Kelvin Pung (Singapore) Tay Wei Ming	21–18, 21–13	Gold
2016	China Administration of Sport for Persons with Disabilities, Beijing, China	(Malaysia) Hairol Fozi Saaba	(Indonesia) Oddie Listyanto Putra (Indonesia) Suryo Nugroho	21–9, 21–15	Gold

=== ASEAN Para Games ===
==== Men's singles SU5 ====
Year	Venue	Opponent	Score	Result
2003	Hanoi Sports Palace, Hanoi, Vietnam			Bronze
2005	PSC Badminton Hall, Manila, Philippines			Gold
2008	Vongchavalitkul University Gymnasium, Nakhon Ratchasima, Thailand	(Indonesia) Imam Kunantoro	2–0	Gold
2009	Axiata Arena, Kuala Lumpur, Malaysia			Gold
2011	Sritex Sports Arena, Surakarta, Indonesia	(Indonesia) Imam Kunantoro	22–20, 21–18	Gold
2015	OCBC Arena, Singapore	(Indonesia) Suryo Nugroho	17–21, 19–21	Silver
2017	Axiata Arena, Kuala Lumpur, Malaysia	(Indonesia) Suryo Nugroho	21–11, 21–15	Gold
2022	Edutorium Muhammadiyah University of Surakarta, Surakarta, Indonesia	(Malaysia) Mohamad Faris Ahmad Azri	21–18, 21–14	Gold

==== Men's doubles SU5 ====
Year	Venue	Partner	Opponent	Score	Result
2003	Hanoi Sports Palace, Hanoi, Vietnam	(Malaysia) Razali Jaafar			Silver
2005	PSC Badminton Hall, Manila, Philippines	(Malaysia) Razali Jaafar			Silver
2008 (Note: This tournament uses a round robin system.)	Vongchavalitkul University Gymnasium, Nakhon Ratchasima, Thailand	(Malaysia) Suhaili Laiman	(Malaysia) Thiraviasamy Savarinathan (Malaysia) Mohd Zambri Yusof	21–15, 23–21	Gold
2008	Vongchavalitkul University Gymnasium, Nakhon Ratchasima, Thailand	(Malaysia) Suhaili Laiman	(Indonesia) Imam Kunantoro (Indonesia) Pribadi	21–7, 21–13	Gold
2008	Vongchavalitkul University Gymnasium, Nakhon Ratchasima, Thailand	(Malaysia) Suhaili Laiman	(Thailand) Somsak Duangchai (Thailand) Ratthasart Thuyweang	21–11, 21–14	Gold
2008	Vongchavalitkul University Gymnasium, Nakhon Ratchasima, Thailand	(Malaysia) Suhaili Laiman	(Vietnam) Phạm Văn Tài (Vietnam) Thân Duy Chi	21–15, 21–11	Gold
2009	Axiata Arena, Kuala Lumpur, Malaysia	(Malaysia) Suhaili Laiman			Gold
2011	Sritex Sports Arena, Surakarta, Indonesia	(Malaysia) Suhaili Laiman	(Indonesia) Imam Kunantoro (Indonesia) Suryo Nugroho	21–13, 23–21	Gold
2015	OCBC Arena, Singapore	(Malaysia) Hairol Fozi Saaba	(Indonesia) Oddie Listyanto Putra (Indonesia) Suryo Nugroho	21–13, 21–6	Gold
2017	Axiata Arena, Kuala Lumpur, Malaysia	(Malaysia) Hairol Fozi Saaba	(Indonesia) Oddie Listyanto Putra (Indonesia) Suryo Nugroho	21–16, 19–21, 19–21	Bronze
2022	Edutorium Muhammadiyah University of Surakarta, Surakarta, Indonesia	(Malaysia) Muhammad Fareez Anuar	(Indonesia) Oddie Listyanto Putra (Indonesia) Suryo Nugroho	19–21, 21–15, 19–21	Bronze

==== Mixed doubles SL3–SU5 ====
Year	Venue	Partner	Opponent	Score	Result
2008	Vongchavalitkul University Gymnasium, Nakhon Ratchasima, Thailand	(Malaysia) Nor Fariha Kamarudin	(Thailand) Somsak Duangchai (Thailand) Sudsaifon Yodpa	21–7, 25–23	Gold
2008	Vongchavalitkul University Gymnasium, Nakhon Ratchasima, Thailand	(Malaysia) Nor Fariha Kamarudin	(Vietnam) Nguyễn Văn Tài (Vietnam) Đoàn Thị Ngãi	21–14, 21–10	Gold
2008	Vongchavalitkul University Gymnasium, Nakhon Ratchasima, Thailand	(Malaysia) Nor Fariha Kamarudin	(Indonesia) Pribadi (Indonesia) Hamida	21–10, 21–11	Gold
2009	Axiata Arena, Kuala Lumpur, Malaysia	(Malaysia) Nor Fariha Kamarudin			Gold
2011	Sritex Sports Arena, Surakarta, Indonesia	(Malaysia) Norazlin Sulaiman	(Indonesia) Dona Wuhyananto (Indonesia) Larti	21–13, 21–17	Gold
2011	Sritex Sports Arena, Surakarta, Indonesia	(Malaysia) Norazlin Sulaiman	(Thailand) Narinchort Khowbunyarasri (Thailand) Sudsaifon Yodpa	21–16, 23–21	Gold
2011	Sritex Sports Arena, Surakarta, Indonesia	(Malaysia) Norazlin Sulaiman	(Vietnam) Phạm Hồng Tuấn (Vietnam) Đoàn Thị Ngãi	22–20, 21–12	Gold
2011	Sritex Sports Arena, Surakarta, Indonesia	(Malaysia) Norazlin Sulaiman	(Thailand) Somsak Duangchai (Thailand) Wandee Kamtam	21–7, 21–13	Gold

=== BWF Para Badminton World Circuit (27 titles, 2 runners-up) ===
The BWF Para Badminton World Circuit – Grade 2, Level 1, 2 and 3 tournaments has been sanctioned by the Badminton World Federation from 2022.

==== Men's singles SU5 ====
Year	Tournament	Level	Opponent	Score	Result
2022	Brazil Para-Badminton International	Level 2	(France) Méril Loquette	21–17, 21–17	(gold) Winner
2022	Bahrain Para-Badminton International	Level 2	(Poland) Bartłomiej Mróz	21–7, 21–12	(gold) Winner
2022	Dubai Para-Badminton International	Level 2	(Japan) Taiyo Imai	21–11, 21–19	(gold) Winner
2022	4 Nations Para-Badminton International	Level 1	(Japan) Taiyo Imai	21–17, 21–16	(gold) Winner
2022	Thailand Para-Badminton International	Level 1	(Chinese Taipei) Fang Jen-yu	22–20, 21–15	(gold) Winner
2023	Spanish Para-Badminton International II	Level 2	(Indonesia) Dheva Anrimusthi	11–21, 21–17, 17–21	(silver) Runner-up
2023	Spanish Para-Badminton International I	Level 1	(Chinese Taipei) Fang Jen-yu	21–7, 21–13	(gold) Winner
2023	Brazil Para-Badminton International	Level 2	(Malaysia) Muhammad Fareez Anuar	21–19, 21–19	(gold) Winner
2023	Bahrain Para-Badminton International	Level 2	(Indonesia) Suryo Nugroho	21–13, 21–10	(gold) Winner
2023	Canada Para-Badminton International	Level 1	(Chinese Taipei) Fang Jen-yu	21–14, 21–13	(gold) Winner
2023	4 Nations Para-Badminton International	Level 1	(Indonesia) Dheva Anrimusthi	21–18, 21–10	(gold) Winner
2023	Dubai Para-Badminton International	Level 1	(Malaysia) Muhammad Fareez Anuar	19–21, 19–21	(silver) Runner-up
2024	Spanish Para-Badminton International II	Level 2	(Chinese Taipei) Fang Jen-yu	21–13, 21–8	(gold) Winner
2024	Spanish Para-Badminton International I	Level 1	(Chinese Taipei) Fang Jen-yu	21–19, 21–17	(gold) Winner
2024	4 Nations Para-Badminton International	Level 1	(Chinese Taipei) Fang Jen-yu	21–12, 21–19	(gold) Winner

==== Men's doubles SU5 ====
Year	Tournament	Level	Partner	Opponent	Score	Result
2022	Bahrain Para-Badminton International	Level 2	(Malaysia) Muhammad Fareez Anuar	(India) Chirag Baretha (India) Raj Kumar	21–14, 19–21, 21–7	(gold) Winner
2022	Dubai Para-Badminton International	Level 2	(Malaysia) Muhammad Fareez Anuar	(Indonesia) Oddie Listyanto Putra (Indonesia) Suryo Nugroho	17–21, 21–15, 21–9	(gold) Winner
2022	4 Nations Para-Badminton International	Level 1	(Malaysia) Mohamad Faris Ahmad Azri	(France) Guillaume Gailly (France) Mathieu Thomas	21–9, 21–10	(gold) Winner
2022	4 Nations Para-Badminton International	Level 1	(Malaysia) Mohamad Faris Ahmad Azri	(India) Nilesh Gaikwad (India) Manoj Sarkar	21–6, 21–16	(gold) Winner
2022	4 Nations Para-Badminton International	Level 1	(Malaysia) Mohamad Faris Ahmad Azri	(India) Chirag Baretha (India) Hardik Makkar	21–19, 21–17	(gold) Winner
2022	Thailand Para-Badminton International	Level 1	(Malaysia) Mohamad Faris Ahmad Azri	(South Korea) Kim Gi-yeon (South Korea) Lee Jeong-soo	21–15, 21–18	(gold) Winner
2022	Thailand Para-Badminton International	Level 1	(Malaysia) Mohamad Faris Ahmad Azri	(France) Méril Loquette (France) Lucas Mazur	21–12, 21–16	(gold) Winner
2022	Thailand Para-Badminton International	Level 1	(Malaysia) Mohamad Faris Ahmad Azri	(Thailand) Pricha Somsiri (Thailand) Chok-Uthaikul Watcharaphon	21–15, 21–13	(gold) Winner
2022	Thailand Para-Badminton International	Level 1	(Malaysia) Mohamad Faris Ahmad Azri	(Chinese Taipei) Fang Jen-yu (Chinese Taipei) Pu Gui-yu	21–11, 22–20	(gold) Winner
2023	Spanish Para-Badminton International II	Level 2	(Malaysia) Muhammad Fareez Anuar	(India) Chirag Baretha (India) Raj Kumar	22–20, 21–23, 21–15	(gold) Winner
2023	Brazil Para-Badminton International	Level 2	(Malaysia) Muhammad Fareez Anuar	(India) Chirag Baretha (India) Raj Kumar	21–13, 21–18	(gold) Winner
2023	Thailand Para-Badminton International	Level 2	(Malaysia) Muhammad Fareez Anuar	(China) Li Mingpan (China) Shi Shengzhuo	21–15, 22–24, 21–14	(gold) Winner
2023	Bahrain Para-Badminton International	Level 2	(Malaysia) Muhammad Fareez Anuar	(India) Chirag Baretha (India) Raj Kumar	21–18, 19–21, 21–14	(gold) Winner
2023	4 Nations Para-Badminton International	Level 1	(Malaysia) Muhammad Fareez Anuar	(South Korea) Jeon Sun-woo (South Korea) Kim Gi-yeon	15–21, 21–11, 21–16	(gold) Winner
2023	4 Nations Para-Badminton International	Level 1	(Malaysia) Muhammad Fareez Anuar	(England) Robert Donald (England) Sean O'Sullivan	21–14, 21–11	(gold) Winner
2023	4 Nations Para-Badminton International	Level 1	(Malaysia) Muhammad Fareez Anuar	(India) Chirag Baretha (India) Raj Kumar	17–21, 21–10, 21–15	(gold) Winner
2023	Western Australia Para-Badminton International	Level 2	(Malaysia) Muhammad Fareez Anuar	(Spain) Manuel García (Spain) Pablo Serrano	21–12, 21–10	(gold) Winner
2023	Western Australia Para-Badminton International	Level 2	(Malaysia) Muhammad Fareez Anuar	(Poland) Bartłomiej Mróz (England) Sean O'Sullivan	21–9, 21–13	(gold) Winner
2023	Western Australia Para-Badminton International	Level 2	(Malaysia) Muhammad Fareez Anuar	(India) Hardik Makkar (India) Ruthick Ragupathi	21–17, 19–21, 21–16	(gold) Winner
2023	Japan Para-Badminton International	Level 2	(Malaysia) Muhammad Fareez Anuar	(Malaysia) Mohamad Faris Ahmad Azri (Malaysia) Amyrul Yazid Ahmad Sibi	21–8, 19–21, 21–17	(gold) Winner
2023	Japan Para-Badminton International	Level 2	(Malaysia) Muhammad Fareez Anuar	(China) Li Mingpan (China) Shi Shengzhuo	21–15, 21–9	(gold) Winner
2023	Japan Para-Badminton International	Level 2	(Malaysia) Muhammad Fareez Anuar	(Poland) Bartłomiej Mróz (Singapore) Tay Wei Ming	21–14, 21–15	(gold) Winner
2023	Japan Para-Badminton International	Level 2	(Malaysia) Muhammad Fareez Anuar	(India) Hardik Makkar (India) Ruthick Ragupathi	21–15, 21–17	(gold) Winner
2023	Dubai Para-Badminton International	Level 1	(Malaysia) Muhammad Fareez Anuar	(Chinese Taipei) Fang Jen-yu (Chinese Taipei) Pu Gui-yu	21–1, 21–10	(gold) Winner
2024	Spanish Para-Badminton International II	Level 2	(Malaysia) Muhammad Fareez Anuar	(India) Chirag Baretha (India) Raj Kumar	21–16, 21–19	(gold) Winner
2024	Spanish Para-Badminton International I	Level 1	(Malaysia) Muhammad Fareez Anuar	(India) Hardik Makkar (India) Ruthick Ragupathi	21–16, 22–20	(gold) Winner

=== International tournaments (from 2011–2021) (35 titles, 6 runners-up) ===
==== Men's singles SU5 ====
Year	Tournament	Opponent	Score	Result
2014	Indonesia Para-Badminton International	(Indonesia) Oddie Listyanto Putra	21–13, 21–19	(gold) Winner
2014	England Para Badminton Championships	(France) Colin Kerouanton	21–11, 21–9	(gold) Winner
2015	Spanish Para-Badminton International	(France) Colin Kerouanton	21–17, 21–6	(gold) Winner
2015	China Para-Badminton International	(Poland) Bartłomiej Mróz	21–15, 21–19	(gold) Winner
2015	Indonesia Para-Badminton International	(Indonesia) Suryo Nugroho	14–21, 19–21	(silver) Runner-up
2016	Irish Para-Badminton International	(Japan) Taiyo Imai	24–26, 21–9, 21–14	(gold) Winner
2017	Spanish Para-Badminton International	(Poland) Bartłomiej Mróz	21–18, 21–14	(gold) Winner
2017	Thailand Para-Badminton International	(Japan) Taiyo Imai	21–13, 21–16	(gold) Winner
2017	Japan Para-Badminton International	(Japan) Tetsuo Ura	21–10, 21–8	(gold) Winner
2017	USA Para-Badminton International	(Japan) Gen Shogaki	21–2, 21–12	(gold) Winner
2018	Dubai Para-Badminton International	(Poland) Bartłomiej Mróz	21–14, 21–9	(gold) Winner
2018	Uganda Para-Badminton International	(India) Sugil Abbas	21–11, 21–5	(gold) Winner
2018	Turkish Para-Badminton International	(Turkey) İlker Tuzcu	21–10, 21–14	(gold) Winner
2018	Irish Para-Badminton International	(Indonesia) Dheva Anrimusthi	21–9, 21–19	(gold) Winner
2019	Dubai Para-Badminton International	(Indonesia) Dheva Anrimusthi	19–21, 21–18, 16–21	(silver) Runner-up
2019	Thailand Para-Badminton International	(Chinese Taipei) Fang Jen-yu	21–14, 21–17	(gold) Winner
2019	China Para-Badminton International	(Indonesia) Suryo Nugroho	21–23, 21–11, 19–21	(silver) Runner-up
2019	Denmark Para-Badminton International	(Indonesia) Suryo Nugroho	21–18, 21–9	(gold) Winner
2019	Japan Para-Badminton International	(Indonesia) Suryo Nugroho	21–16, 21–17	(gold) Winner
2020	Brazil Para-Badminton International	(Indonesia) Dheva Anrimusthi	21–15, 10–21, 21–16	(gold) Winner
2020	Peru Para-Badminton International	(Chinese Taipei) Fang Jen-yu	21–17, 18–21, 21–16	(gold) Winner
2021	Dubai Para-Badminton International	(Indonesia) Dheva Anrimusthi	14–21, 22–20, 21–18	(gold) Winner
2021	Spanish Para-Badminton International	(Japan) Taiyo Imai	21–13, 21–11	(gold) Winner

==== Men's doubles SU5 ====
Year	Tournament	Partner	Opponent	Score	Result
2014	Indonesia Para-Badminton International	(Malaysia) Suhaili Laiman	(Indonesia) Imam Kunantoro (Indonesia) Suryo Nugroho	21–23, 21–16, 21–11	(gold) Winner
2014	England Para Badminton Championships	(Malaysia) Hairol Fozi Saaba	(Poland) Bartłomiej Mróz (Singapore) Tay Wei Ming	21–13, 21–18	(gold) Winner
2015	Spanish Para-Badminton International	(Malaysia) Hairol Fozi Saaba	(England) James Binnie (Netherlands) Mark Modderman	21–8, 21–14	(gold) Winner
2015	China Para-Badminton International	(Malaysia) Hairol Fozi Saaba	(China) Chen Kunxiong (China) Zhu Peiqiang	21–11, 14–21, 21–15	(gold) Winner
2015	Indonesia Para-Badminton International	(Malaysia) Hairol Fozi Saaba	(Indonesia) Imam Kunantoro (Indonesia) Suryo Nugroho	21–11, 21–11	(gold) Winner
2016	Irish Para-Badminton International	(Malaysia) Hairol Fozi Saaba	(Poland) Bartłomiej Mróz (Singapore) Tay Wei Ming	21–16, 19–21, 21–11	(gold) Winner
2017	Spanish Para-Badminton International	(Malaysia) Hairol Fozi Saaba	(Poland) Bartłomiej Mróz (Turkey) İlker Tuzcu	21–14, 22–20	(gold) Winner
2017	Thailand Para-Badminton International	(Malaysia) Hairol Fozi Saaba	(Poland) Bartłomiej Mróz (Turkey) İlker Tuzcu	21–18, 21–14	(gold) Winner
2017	Japan Para-Badminton International	(Malaysia) Hairol Fozi Saaba	(South Korea) Kim Gi-yeon (South Korea) Shin Kyung-hwan	21–16, 13–21, 21–10	(gold) Winner
2017	USA Para-Badminton International	(Malaysia) Hairol Fozi Saaba	(Japan) Taiyo Imai (Japan) Tetsuo Ura	21–14, 23–21	(gold) Winner
2018	Dubai Para-Badminton International	(Malaysia) Hairol Fozi Saaba	(Indonesia) Oddie Listyanto Putra (Indonesia) Suryo Nugroho	21–15, 21–17	(gold) Winner
2018	Uganda Para-Badminton International	(Malaysia) Hairol Fozi Saaba	(India) Sugil Abbas (Brazil) Geraldo da Silva Oliveira	21–12, 21–17	(gold) Winner
2018	Turkish Para-Badminton International	(Malaysia) Hairol Fozi Saaba	(Japan) Gen Shogaki (Japan) Tetsuo Ura	21–10, 21–19	(gold) Winner
2018	Irish Para-Badminton International	(Malaysia) Hairol Fozi Saaba	(Indonesia) Dheva Anrimusthi (Indonesia) Hafizh Briliansyah Prawiranegara	16–21, 21–17, 13–21	(silver) Runner-up
2018	Thailand Para-Badminton International	(Malaysia) Hairol Fozi Saaba	(Indonesia) Dheva Anrimusthi (Indonesia) Hafizh Briliansyah Prawiranegara	19–21, 11–21	(silver) Runner-up
2019	Irish Para-Badminton International	(Malaysia) Mohamad Faris Ahmad Azri	(Indonesia) Dheva Anrimusthi (Indonesia) Hafizh Briliansyah Prawiranegara	19–21, 19–21	(silver) Runner-up
2019	Thailand Para-Badminton International	(Malaysia) Mohamad Faris Ahmad Azri	(Thailand) Pricha Somsiri (Thailand) Chok-Uthaikul Watcharaphon	21–14, 21–14	(gold) Winner
2019	China Para-Badminton International	(Malaysia) Mohamad Faris Ahmad Azri	(Indonesia) Suryo Nugroho (Indonesia) Fredy Setiawan	21–12, 21–15	(gold) Winner

== Honours ==
- Malaysia
  - Officer of the Order of the Defender of the Realm (KMN) (2025)

== In popular culture ==
Cheah's story of winning the gold medal in the 2020 Summer Paralympics was immortalised in the 2024 Malaysian film directed by Adrian Teh, Gold, starring Jack Tan as his titular role.
