= Suryo Nugroho =

Indonesian para-badminton player (born 1995)

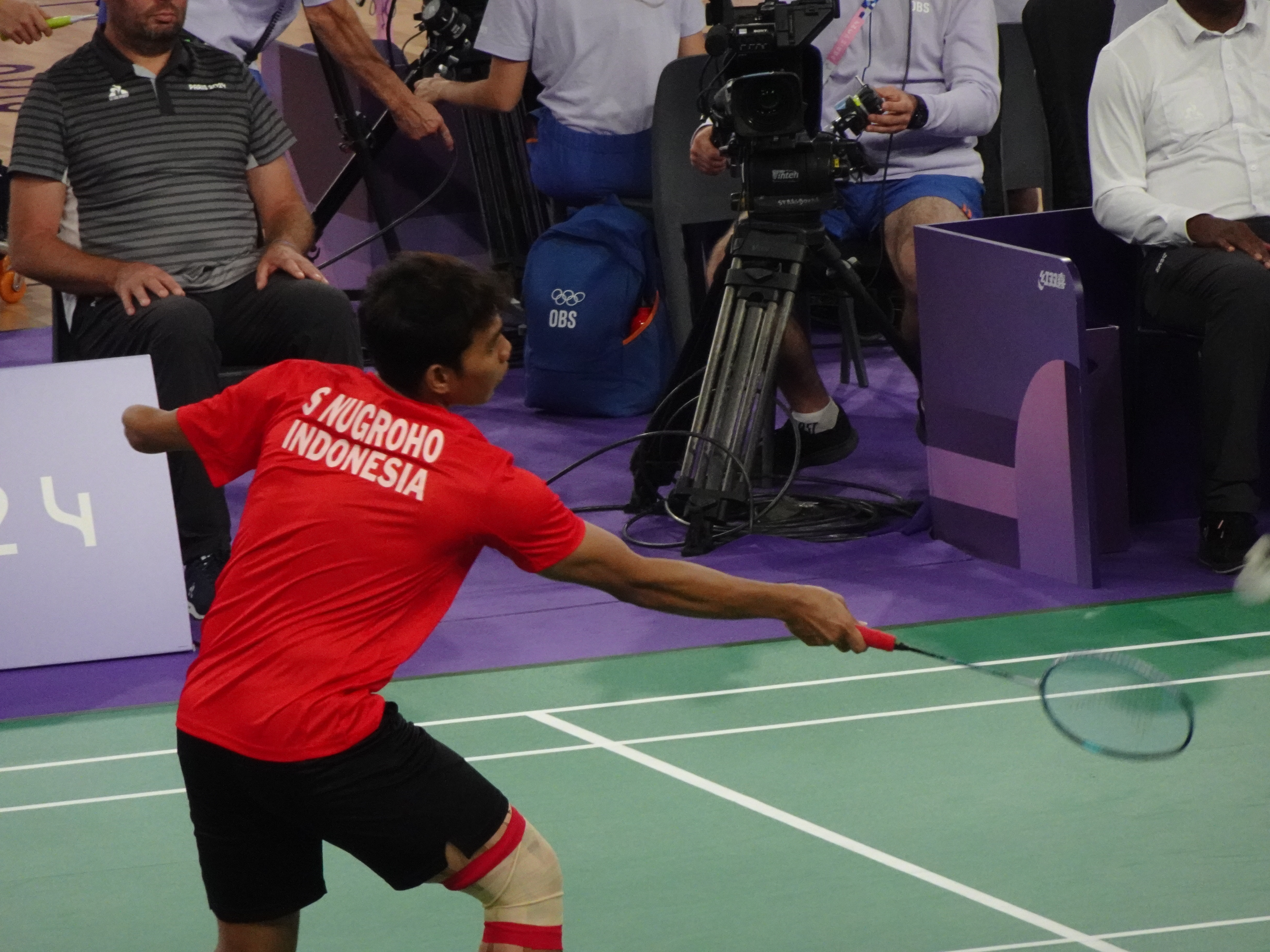
- Nugroho at the 2024 Summer Paralympics

Personal information
- Born: 17 April 1995 (age 31) Surabaya, East Java, Indonesia

Sport
- Country: Indonesia
- Sport: Badminton

Men's singles and doubles SU5
- Highest ranking: 1 (MS 1 January 2019); 1 (MD with Dheva Anrimusthi 30 April 2019)
- Current ranking: 4 (MS); 15 (MD with Oddie Listyanto Putra) (3 September 2024)
Medal record
Men's para-badminton
Representing Indonesia
Paralympic Games
Silver medal – second place	2024 Paris	Men's singles
Bronze medal – third place	2020 Tokyo	Men's singles
World Championships
Gold medal – first place	2017 Ulsan	Men's doubles
Silver medal – second place	2017 Ulsan	Men's singles
Silver medal – second place	2019 Basel	Men's singles
Bronze medal – third place	2022 Tokyo	Men's singles
World Abilitysport Games
Gold medal – first place	2023 Nakhon Ratchasima	Men's singles
Gold medal – first place	2023 Nakhon Ratchasima	Men's doubles
Asian Para Games
Gold medal – first place	2018 Jakarta	Men's team
Gold medal – first place	2026 Aichi–Nagoya	Men's doubles
Silver medal – second place	2010 Guangzhou	Men's singles
Silver medal – second place	2018 Jakarta	Men's singles
Silver medal – second place	2018 Jakarta	Men's doubles
Bronze medal – third place	2014 Incheon	Men's singles
Bronze medal – third place	2014 Incheon	Men's doubles
Bronze medal – third place	2022 Hangzhou	Men's singles
Asian Championships
Gold medal – first place	2016 Beijing	Men's singles
Silver medal – second place	2016 Beijing	Men's doubles
Bronze medal – third place	2025 Nakhon Ratchasima	Men's singles
ASEAN Para Games
Gold medal – first place	2015 Singapore	Men's singles
Gold medal – first place	2015 Singapore	Men's team
Gold medal – first place	2022 Surakarta	Men's team
Gold medal – first place	2023 Cambodia	Men's team
Silver medal – second place	2011 Surakarta	Men's doubles
Silver medal – second place	2015 Singapore	Men's doubles
Silver medal – second place	2017 Kuala Lumpur	Men's singles
Silver medal – second place	2017 Kuala Lumpur	Men's doubles
Silver medal – second place	2022 Surakarta	Men's doubles
Bronze medal – third place	2011 Surakarta	Men's singles
Bronze medal – third place	2022 Surakarta	Men's singles
Asian Youth Para Games
Gold medal – first place	2013 Kuala Lumpur	Boys' singles

Suryo Nugroho (born 17 April 1995) is an Indonesian para-badminton player. He won the bronze and silver medal at the men's singles SU5 event at the 2020 and 2024 Summer Paralympics respectively. In 2017, he won the BWF Para-Badminton World Championships, when he partnered Singaporean Tay Wei Ming to defeat the World No.1 Malaysian pair of Cheah Liek Hou and Hairol Fozi Saaba to claim gold in the men's doubles SU5.

== Awards and nominations ==
Award	Year	Category	Result	Ref.
Indonesian Sport Awards	2018	Most Favorited Male Para Athlete Pairs (with Oddie Listyanto Putra)	Nominated	
Indonesian Sport Awards	2018	Most Favorited Men's Team Para Athlete (with 2018 Asian Para Games Men's Team Standing)	Won	

== Achievements ==
=== Paralympic Games ===
Men's singles SU5

Year	Venue	Opponent	Score	Result
2020	Yoyogi National Gymnasium, Tokyo, Japan	(Chinese Taipei) Fang Jen-yu	21–16, 21–9	Bronze
2024	Porte de La Chapelle Arena, Paris, France	(Malaysia) Cheah Liek Hou	13–21, 15–21	Silver

=== World Championships ===
Men's singles SU5

Year	Venue	Opponent	Score	Result	Ref
2017	Dongchun Gymnasium, Ulsan, South Korea	(Malaysia) Cheah Liek Hou	21–19, 15–21, 18–21	Silver	
2019	St. Jakobshalle, Basel, Switzerland	(Indonesia) Dheva Anrimusthi	15–21, 15–21	Silver	
2022	Yoyogi National Gymnasium, Tokyo, Japan	(Malaysia) Cheah Liek Hou	13–21, 19–21	Bronze	

Men's doubles SU5

Year	Venue	Partner	Opponent	Score	Result	Ref
2017	Dongchun Gymnasium, Ulsan, South Korea	(Singapore) Tay Wei Ming	(Malaysia) Cheah Liek Hou (Malaysia) Hairol Fozi Saaba	18–21, 23–21, 21–18	Gold	

=== World Abilitysport Games ===
Men's singles SU5

Year	Venue	Opponent	Score	Result
2023	Terminal 21 Korat Hall, Nakhon Ratchasima, Thailand	(Chinese Taipei) Fang Jen-yu	21–9, 21–10	Gold

Men's doubles SU5

Year	Venue	Partner	Opponent	Score	Result
2023	Terminal 21 Korat Hall, Nakhon Ratchasima, Thailand	(Indonesia) Hafizh Briliansyah Prawiranegara	(Chinese Taipei) Fang Jen-yu (Chinese Taipei) Pu Gui-yu	21–14, 21–10	Gold
2023	Terminal 21 Korat Hall, Nakhon Ratchasima, Thailand	(Indonesia) Hafizh Briliansyah Prawiranegara	(Thailand) Pricha Somsiri (Thailand) Nattaphon Thaweesap	21–11, 21–15	Gold
2023	Terminal 21 Korat Hall, Nakhon Ratchasima, Thailand	(Indonesia) Hafizh Briliansyah Prawiranegara	(Iraq) Ahmed Khudhair (Thailand) Sorawat Phokaew	21–8, 21–7	Gold

=== Asian Para Games ===
Men's singles SU5

Year	Venue	Opponent	Score	Result
2010	Tianhe Gymnasium, Guangzhou, China	(Malaysia) Cheah Liek Hou	8–21, 10–21	Silver
2014	Gyeyang Gymnasium, Incheon, South Korea	(Malaysia) Cheah Liek Hou	15–21, 6–21	Bronze
2018	Istora Gelora Bung Karno, Jakarta, Indonesia	(Indonesia) Dheva Anrimusthi	20–22, 13–21	Silver
2022	Binjiang Gymnasium, Hangzhou, China	(Indonesia) Dheva Anrimusthi	11–21, 10–21	Bronze

Men's doubles

Year	Venue	Partner	Opponent	Score	Result
2014	Gyeyang Gymnasium, Incheon, South Korea	(Indonesia) Imam Kunantoro	(India) Rakesh Pandey (India) Raj Kumar	17–21, 15–21	Bronze
2018	Istora Gelora Bung Karno, Jakarta, Indonesia	(Indonesia) Oddie Listyanto Putra	(Indonesia) Dheva Anrimusthi (Indonesia) Hafizh Briliansyah Prawiranegara	9–21, 9–21	Silver
2026	Ichinomiya City Municipal Gymnasium, Ichinomiya, Japan	(Indonesia) Muhammad Al Imran	(South Korea) Cho Na-dan (South Korea) Shin Kyung-hwan	25–23, 21–8	Gold

=== Asian Championships ===
Men's singles SU5

Year	Venue	Opponent	Score	Result	Ref
2016	China Administration of Sport for Persons with Disabilities, Beijing, China	(Japan) Taiyo Imai	21–13, 21–7	Gold	
2025	SPADT Convention Center, Nakhon Ratchasima, Thailand	(Malaysia) Cheah Liek Hou	12–21, 21–17, 8–11 Retired	Bronze	

Men's doubles SU5

Year	Venue	Partner	Opponent	Score	Result
2016	China Administration of Sport for Persons with Disabilities, Beijing, China	(Indonesia) Oddie Listyanto Putra	(Malaysia) Cheah Liek Hou (Malaysia) Hairol Fozi Saaba	9–21, 15–21	Silver

=== ASEAN Para Games ===
Men's singles SU5

Year	Venue	Opponent	Score	Result
2011	Sritex Sports Arena, Surakarta, Indonesia	(Malaysia) Cheah Liek Hou	12–21, 15–21	Bronze
2015	OCBC Arena, Singapore	(Malaysia) Cheah Liek Hou	21–17, 21–19	Gold
2017	Axiata Arena, Kuala Lumpur, Malaysia	(Malaysia) Cheah Liek Hou	11–21, 15–21	Silver
2022	Edutorium Muhammadiyah University of Surakarta, Surakarta, Indonesia	(Malaysia) Mohamad Faris Ahmad Azri	11–21, 10–21	Bronze
2023	Morodok Techo Badminton Hall, Phnom Penh, Cambodia	(Indonesia) Dheva Anrimusthi	11–21, 9–21	Silver

Men's doubles SU5

Year	Venue	Partner	Opponent	Score	Result
2011	Sritex Sports Arena, Surakarta, Indonesia	(Indonesia) Imam Kunantoro	(Malaysia) Cheah Liek Hou (Malaysia) Hairol Fozi Saaba	13–21, 21–23	Silver
2015	OCBC Arena, Singapore	(Indonesia) Oddie Listyanto Putra	(Malaysia) Cheah Liek Hou (Malaysia) Hairol Fozi Saaba	13–21, 6–21	Silver
2017	Axiata Arena, Kuala Lumpur, Malaysia	(Indonesia) Oddie Listyanto Putra	(Indonesia) Dheva Anrimusthi (Indonesia) Hafizh Briliansyah Prawiranegara	15–21, 12–21	Silver
2022	Edutorium Muhammadiyah University of Surakarta, Surakarta, Indonesia	(Indonesia) Oddie Listyanto Putra	(Indonesia) Dheva Anrimusthi (Indonesia) Hafizh Briliansyah Prawiranegara	15–21, 12–21	Silver
2023	Morodok Techo Badminton Hall, Phnom Penh, Cambodia	(Indonesia) Oddie Listyanto Putra	(Indonesia) Dheva Anrimusthi (Indonesia) Hafizh Briliansyah Prawiranegara	12–21, 10–21	Silver

=== Asian Youth Para Games ===
Boys' singles SU5

Year	Venue	Opponent	Score	Result	Ref
2013	Stadium Juara, Kuala Lumpur, Malaysia	(Indonesia) Oddie Listyanto Putra		Gold	

=== BWF Para Badminton World Circuit (2 titles, 6 runners-up) ===
The BWF Para Badminton World Circuit – Grade 2, Level 1, 2 and 3 tournaments has been sanctioned by the Badminton World Federation from 2022.

Men's singles SU5

Year	Tournament	Level	Opponent	Score	Result	Ref
2023	Thailand Para-Badminton International	Level 2	(Indonesia) Dheva Anrimusthi	17–21, 12–21	(silver) Runner-up	
2023	Bahrain Para-Badminton International	Level 2	(Malaysia) Cheah Liek Hou	13–21, 10–21	(silver) Runner-up	
2023	Indonesia Para-Badminton International	Level 3	(Indonesia) Dheva Anrimusthi	15–21, 14–21	(silver) Runner-up	
2023	Japan Para-Badminton International	Level 2	(Chinese Taipei) Fang Jen-yu	15–21, 21–16, 17–21	(silver) Runner-up	
2024	Bahrain Para-Badminton International	Level 2	(Indonesia) Dheva Anrimusthi	Walkover	(gold) Winner	
2024	Indonesia Para-Badminton International	Level 2	(India) Ruthick Ragupathi	24–22, 21–18	(gold) Winner	

Men's doubles SU5

Year	Tournament	Level	Partner	Opponent	Score	Result
2022	Dubai Para-Badminton International	Level 2	(Indonesia) Oddie Listyanto Putra	(Malaysia) Muhammad Fareez Anuar (Malaysia) Cheah Liek Hou	21–17, 15–21, 9–21	(silver) Runner-up
2023	Indonesia Para-Badminton International	Level 3	(Indonesia) Oddie Listyanto Putra	(Indonesia) Dheva Anrimusthi (Indonesia) Hafizh Briliansyah Prawiranegara	16–21, 21–23	(silver) Runner-up

=== International tournaments (from 2011–2021) (10 titles, 10 runners-up) ===
Men's singles SU5

Year	Tournament	Opponent	Score	Result
2015	Indonesia Para-Badminton International	(Malaysia) Cheah Liek Hou	21–14, 21–19	(gold) Winner
2016	Indonesia Para-Badminton International	(Poland) Bartłomiej Mróz	22–24, 13–21	(silver) Runner-up
2018	Thailand Para-Badminton International	(Indonesia) Dheva Anrimusthi	15–21, 17–21	(silver) Runner-up
2018	Australia Para-Badminton International	(Japan) Taiyo Imai	14–21, 22–20, 21–10	(gold) Winner
2019	Turkish Para-Badminton International	(Indonesia) Dheva Anrimusthi	15–21, 8–21	(silver) Runner-up
2019	China Para-Badminton International	(Malaysia) Cheah Liek Hou	23–21, 11–21, 21–19	(gold) Winner
2019	Denmark Para-Badminton International	(Malaysia) Cheah Liek Hou	18–21, 9–21	(silver) Runner-up
2019	Japan Para-Badminton International	(Malaysia) Cheah Liek Hou	16–21, 17–21	(silver) Runner-up

Men's doubles SU5

Year	Tournament	Partner	Opponent	Score	Result
2014	Indonesia Para-Badminton International	(Indonesia) Imam Kunantoro	(Malaysia) Cheah Liek Hou (Malaysia) Suhalli Laiman	23–21, 16–21, 11–21	(silver) Runner-up
2015	Indonesia Para-Badminton International	(Indonesia) Imam Kunantoro	(Malaysia) Cheah Liek Hou (Malaysia) Hairol Fozi Saaba	21–6, 21–23, 23–21	(gold) Winner
2016	Indonesia Para-Badminton International	(Indonesia) Oddie Listyanto Putra	(Indonesia) Imam Kunantoro (Indonesia) Arya Sadewa	21–13, 21–18	(gold) Winner
2018	Dubai Para-Badminton International	(Indonesia) Oddie Listyanto Putra	(Malaysia) Cheah Liek Hou (Malaysia) Hairol Fozi Saaba	15–21, 17–21	(silver) Runner-up
2018	Irish Para-Badminton International	(India) Sukant Kadam	(Indonesia) Dheva Anrimusthi (Indonesia) Hafizh Briliansyah Prawiranegara	9–21, 13–21	(silver) Runner-up
2019	Turkish Para-Badminton International	(Indonesia) Dheva Anrimusthi	(Thailand) Pricha Somsiri (Thailand) Chokuthaikul Watcharaphon	21–19, 21–16	(gold) Winner
2019	Dubai Para-Badminton International	(Indonesia) Dheva Anrimusthi	(India) Raj Kumar (India) Rakesh Pandey	22–20, 21–14	(gold) Winner
2019	China Para-Badminton International	(Indonesia) Fredy Setiawan	(Malaysia) Mohamad Faris Ahmad Azri (Malaysia) Cheah Liek Hou	12–21, 15–21	(silver) Runner-up
2019	Denmark Para-Badminton International	(Indonesia) Fredy Setiawan	(India) Chirag Baretha (India) Raj Kumar	21–14, 21–14	(gold) Winner
2020	Brazil Para-Badminton International	(Indonesia) Fredy Setiawan	(India) Raj Kumar (India) Rakesh Pandey	21–10, 8–21, 21–10	(gold) Winner
2021	Dubai Para-Badminton International	(Indonesia) Fredy Setiawan	(France) Méril Loquette (France) Lucas Mazur	19–21, 21–13, 19–21	(silver) Runner-up

Mixed doubles SL3–SU5

Year	Tournament	Partner	Opponent	Score	Result
2014	Indonesia Para-Badminton International	(Indonesia) Khalimatus Sadiyah	(Indonesia) Fredy Setiawan (Indonesia) Leani Ratri Oktila	21–19, 21–17	(gold) Winner
