= Fang Jen-yu =

Taiwanese para-badminton player (born 1998)

Fang Jen-yu 方振宇
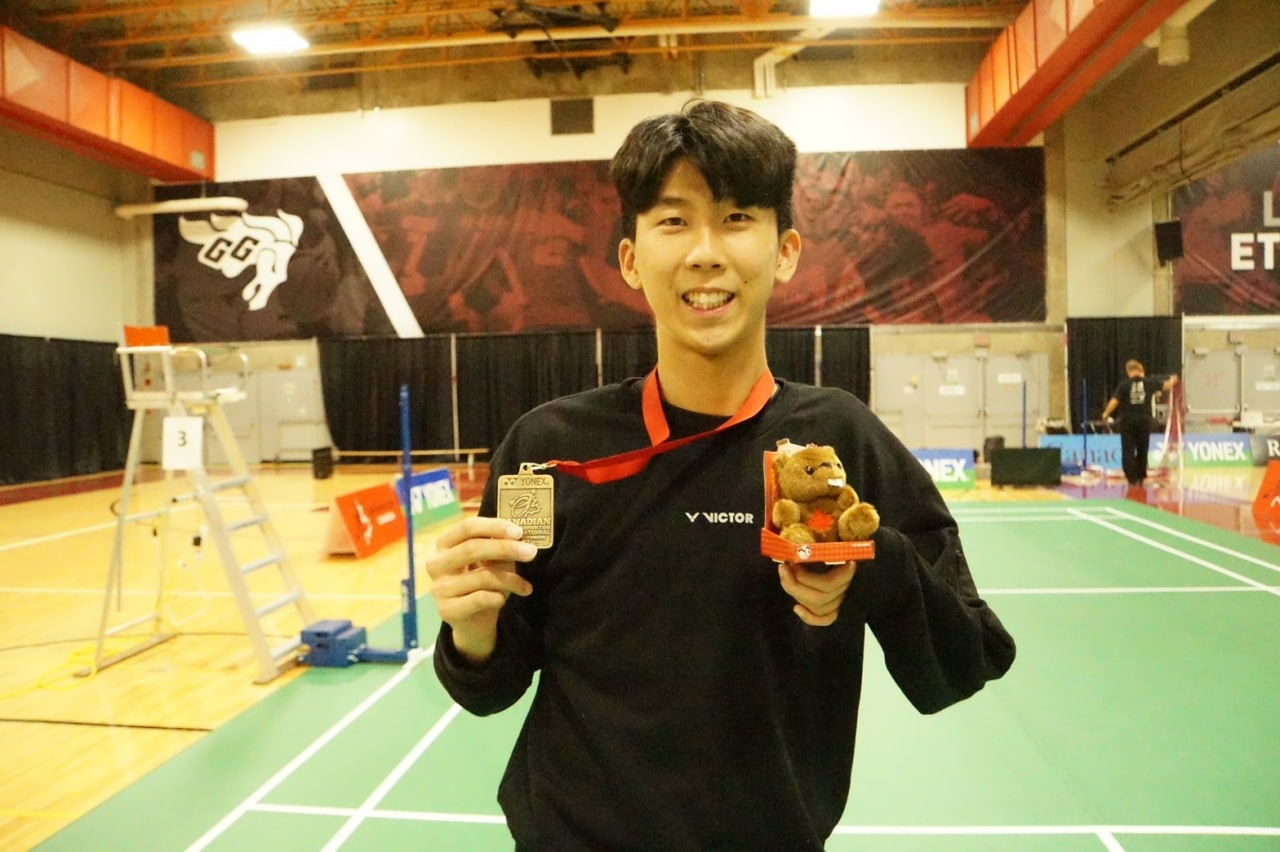
- Fang in 2022

Personal information
- Born: 16 November 1998 (age 27) Tainan, Taiwan

Sport
- Sport: Badminton
- Handedness: Right

Men's singles and doubles SU5
- Highest ranking: 2 (MS 27 August 2024); 3 (MD with Pu Gui-yu 27 February 2024)
- Current ranking: 3 (MS); 4 (MD with Pu Gui-yu) (17 September 2024)
Medal record
Men's para-badminton
Representing Chinese Taipei
World Championships
Silver medal – second place	2026 Manama	Men's singles
Silver medal – second place	2026 Manama	Men's doubles
Bronze medal – third place	2024 Pattaya	Men's singles
World Abilitysport Games
Silver medal – second place	2023 Nakhon Ratchasima	Men's singles
Asian Para Games
Bronze medal – third place	2022 Hangzhou	Men's singles
Bronze medal – third place	2022 Hangzhou	Men's doubles

Fang Jen-yu (Chinese: 方振宇; pinyin: Fāng Zhènyǔ; born 16 November 1998) is a Taiwanese para-badminton player. He finished in fourth place in the men's singles SU5 event at the 2020 Summer Paralympics in Tokyo.

== Biography ==
Fang was born in Tainan City, Taiwan. Due to dystocia at birth, he suffered a nerve plexus injury in his left shoulder. His left upper limb muscle atrophied and he had no obvious movement function.

== Achievements ==
=== World Championships ===
Men's singles SU5

Year	Venue	Opponent	Score	Result
2024	Pattaya Exhibition and Convention Hall, Pattaya, Thailand	(Malaysia) Cheah Liek Hou	14–21, 18–21	(silver) Bronze
2026	Isa Sports City, Manama, Bahrain	(Malaysia) Cheah Liek Hou	6–21, 11–21	Silver

Men's doubles SU5

Year	Venue	Partner	Opponent	Score	Result
2026	Isa Sports City, Manama, Bahrain	(Chinese Taipei) Pu Gui-yu	(Malaysia) Mohamad Faris Ahmad Azri (Malaysia) Cheah Liek Hou	21–23, 13–21	Silver

=== World Abilitysport Games ===
Men's singles SU5

Year	Venue	Opponent	Score	Result
2023	Terminal 21 Korat Hall, Nakhon Ratchasima, Thailand	(Indonesia) Suryo Nugroho	10–21, 9–21	Silver

=== Asian Para Games ===
Men's singles SU5

Year	Venue	Opponent	Score	Result
2022	Binjiang Gymnasium, Hangzhou, China	(Malaysia) Cheah Liek Hou	7–21, 9–21	(silver) Bronze

Men's doubles SU5

Year	Venue	Partner	Opponent	Score	Result
2022	Binjiang Gymnasium, Hangzhou, China	(Chinese Taipei) Pu Gui-yu	(India) Chirag Baretha (India) Raj Kumar	15–21, 21–16, 9–21	Bronze

=== BWF Para Badminton World Circuit (3 titles, 6 runners-up) ===
The BWF Para Badminton World Circuit – Grade 2, Level 1, 2 and 3 tournaments has been sanctioned by the Badminton World Federation from 2022.

Men's singles SU5

Year	Tournament	Level	Opponent	Score	Result
2022	Spanish Para-Badminton International II	Level 2	(France) Méril Loquette	21–13, 21–18	(gold) Winner
2022	Canada Para-Badminton International	Level 1	(France) Méril Loquette	21–13, 20–22, 21–18	(gold) Winner
2022	Thailand Para-Badminton International	Level 1	(Malaysia) Cheah Liek Hou	20–22, 15–21	(silver) Runner-up
2023	Spanish Para-Badminton International I	Level 1	(Malaysia) Cheah Liek Hou	7–21, 13–21	(silver) Runner-up
2023	Canada Para-Badminton International	Level 1	(Malaysia) Cheah Liek Hou	14–21, 13–21	(silver) Runner-up
2023	Japan Para-Badminton International	Level 2	(Indonesia) Suryo Nugroho	21–15, 16–21, 21–17	(gold) Winner
2024	Spanish Para-Badminton International II	Level 2	(Malaysia) Cheah Liek Hou	13–21, 8–21	(silver) Runner-up
2024	Spanish Para-Badminton International I	Level 1	(Malaysia) Cheah Liek Hou	19–21, 17–21	(silver) Runner-up
2024	4 Nations Para-Badminton International	Level 1	(Malaysia) Cheah Liek Hou	12–21, 19–21	(silver) Runner-up

Men's doubles SU5

Year	Tournament	Level	Partner	Opponent	Score	Result
2023	Dubai Para-Badminton International	Level 1	(Chinese Taipei) Pu Gui-yu	(Malaysia) Cheah Liek Hou (Malaysia) Muhammad Fareez Anuar	1–21, 10–21	(silver) Runner-up

=== International tournaments (from 2011–2021) (2 runners-up) ===
Men's singles SU5

Year	Tournament	Opponent	Score	Result
2019	Thailand Para-Badminton International	(Malaysia) Cheah Liek Hou	14–21, 17–21	(silver) Runner-up
2020	Peru Para-Badminton International	(Malaysia) Cheah Liek Hou	17–21, 21–18, 16–21	(silver) Runner-up
