= Muhammad Fareez Anuar =

Malaysian para-badminton player (born 1996)

Personal information
- Born: 27 July 1996 (age 29) Johor Bahru, Malaysia

Sport
- Country: Malaysia
- Sport: Badminton
- Handedness: Right
- Coached by: Nova Armada

Men's singles and doubles SU5
- Highest ranking: 4 (MS 25 June 2024); 1 (MD with Cheah Liek Hou 27 February 2024)
- Current ranking: 5 (MS); 1 (MD with Cheah Liek Hou) (24 September 2024)
Medal record
Men's para-badminton
Representing Malaysia
World Championships
Gold medal – first place	2024 Pattaya	Men's doubles
Asian Para Games
Bronze medal – third place	2022 Hangzhou	Men's doubles
ASEAN Para Games
Silver medal – second place	2023 Cambodia	Men's team
Bronze medal – third place	2022 Surakarta	Men's doubles
Bronze medal – third place	2023 Cambodia	Men's doubles

Muhammad Fareez bin Anuar (born 27 July 1996) is a Malaysian para-badminton player. He won a gold medal in the men's doubles SU5 event at the 2024 BWF Para-Badminton World Championships. At the 2024 Summer Paralympics, he finished fourth in the men's singles SU5 event.

== Biography ==
Fareez has a disability in his right elbow due to a motorcycle accident he suffered from at the age of 15.

== Achievements ==
=== World Championships ===
Men's doubles SU5

Year	Venue	Partner	Opponent	Score	Result
2024	Pattaya Exhibition and Convention Hall, Pattaya, Thailand	(Malaysia) Cheah Liek Hou	(India) Chirag Baretha (India) Raj Kumar	21–17, 21–18	Gold

=== Asian Para Games ===
Men's doubles SU5

Year	Venue	Partner	Opponent	Score	Result
2022	Binjiang Gymnasium, Hangzhou, China	(Malaysia) Cheah Liek Hou	(Indonesia) Dheva Anrimusthi (Indonesia) Hafizh Briliansyah Prawiranegara	21–19, 15–21, 12–21	Bronze

=== ASEAN Para Games ===
Men's doubles SU5

Year	Venue	Partner	Opponent	Score	Result
2022	Edutorium Muhammadiyah University of Surakarta, Surakarta, Indonesia	(Malaysia) Cheah Liek Hou	(Indonesia) Oddie Listyanto Putra (Indonesia) Suryo Nugroho	19–21, 21–15, 19–21	Bronze
2023	Morodok Techo Badminton Hall, Phnom Penh, Cambodia	(Malaysia) Mohamad Faris Ahmad Azri	(Indonesia) Oddie Listyanto Putra (Indonesia) Suryo Nugroho	16–21, 21–19, 22–24	Bronze

=== BWF Para Badminton World Circuit (15 titles, 3 runners-up) ===
The BWF Para Badminton World Circuit – Grade 2, Level 1, 2 and 3 tournaments has been sanctioned by the Badminton World Federation from 2022.

Men's singles SU5

Year	Tournament	Level	Opponent	Score	Result
2023	Brazil Para-Badminton International	Level 2	(Malaysia) Cheah Liek Hou	19–21, 19–21	(silver) Runner-up
2023	Western Australia Para-Badminton International	Level 2	(Indonesia) Dheva Anrimusthi	15–21, 12–21	(silver) Runner-up
2023	Dubai Para-Badminton International	Level 1	(Malaysia) Cheah Liek Hou	21–19, 21–19	(gold) Winner

Men's doubles SU5

Year	Tournament	Level	Partner	Opponent	Score	Result
2022	Bahrain Para-Badminton International	Level 2	(Malaysia) Cheah Liek Hou	(India) Chirag Baretha (India) Raj Kumar	21–14, 19–21, 21–7	(gold) Winner
2022	Dubai Para-Badminton International	Level 2	(Malaysia) Cheah Liek Hou	(Indonesia) Oddie Listyanto Putra (Indonesia) Suryo Nugroho	17–21, 21–15, 21–9	(gold) Winner
2022 (Note: This tournament uses a round robin system.)	4 Nations Para-Badminton International	Level 1	(Malaysia) Cheah Liek Hou	(France) Guillaume Gailly (France) Mathieu Thomas	21–9, 21–10	(gold) Winner
2022	4 Nations Para-Badminton International	Level 1	(Malaysia) Cheah Liek Hou	(India) Nilesh Gaikwad (India) Manoj Sarkar	21–6, 21–16	(gold) Winner
2022	4 Nations Para-Badminton International	Level 1	(Malaysia) Cheah Liek Hou	(India) Chirag Baretha (India) Hardik Makkar	21–19, 21–17	(gold) Winner
2022	Thailand Para-Badminton International	Level 1	(Malaysia) Cheah Liek Hou	(South Korea) Kim Gi-yeon (South Korea) Lee Jeong-soo	21–15, 21–18	(gold) Winner
2022	Thailand Para-Badminton International	Level 1	(Malaysia) Cheah Liek Hou	(France) Méril Loquette (France) Lucas Mazur	21–12, 21–16	(gold) Winner
2022	Thailand Para-Badminton International	Level 1	(Malaysia) Cheah Liek Hou	(Thailand) Pricha Somsiri (Thailand) Chok-Uthaikul Watcharaphon	21–15, 21–13	(gold) Winner
2022	Thailand Para-Badminton International	Level 1	(Malaysia) Cheah Liek Hou	(Chinese Taipei) Fang Jen-yu (Chinese Taipei) Pu Gui-yu	21–11, 22–20	(gold) Winner
2022	Indonesia Para-Badminton International	Level 3	(Malaysia) Mohd Amin Burhanuddin	(Indonesia) Dheva Anrimusthi (Indonesia) Hafizh Briliansyah Prawiranegara	16–21, 10–21	(silver) Runner-up
2023	Spanish Para-Badminton International II	Level 2	(Malaysia) Cheah Liek Hou	(India) Chirag Baretha (India) Raj Kumar	22–20, 21–23, 21–15	(gold) Winner
2023	Brazil Para-Badminton International	Level 2	(Malaysia) Cheah Liek Hou	(India) Chirag Baretha (India) Raj Kumar	21–13, 21–18	(gold) Winner
2023	Thailand Para-Badminton International	Level 2	(Malaysia) Cheah Liek Hou	(China) Li Mingpan (China) Shi Shengzhuo	21–15, 22–24, 21–14	(gold) Winner
2023	Bahrain Para-Badminton International	Level 2	(Malaysia) Cheah Liek Hou	(India) Chirag Baretha (India) Raj Kumar	21–18, 19–21, 21–14	(gold) Winner
2023	4 Nations Para-Badminton International	Level 1	(Malaysia) Cheah Liek Hou	(South Korea) Jeon Sun-woo (South Korea) Kim Gi-yeon	15–21, 21–11, 21–16	(gold) Winner
2023	4 Nations Para-Badminton International	Level 1	(Malaysia) Cheah Liek Hou	(England) Robert Donald (England) Sean O'Sullivan	21–14, 21–11	(gold) Winner
2023	4 Nations Para-Badminton International	Level 1	(Malaysia) Cheah Liek Hou	(India) Chirag Baretha (India) Raj Kumar	17–21, 21–10, 21–15	(gold) Winner
2023	Western Australia Para-Badminton International	Level 2	(Malaysia) Cheah Liek Hou	(Spain) Manuel García (Spain) Pablo Serrano	21–12, 21–10	(gold) Winner
2023	Western Australia Para-Badminton International	Level 2	(Malaysia) Cheah Liek Hou	(Poland) Bartłomiej Mróz (England) Sean O'Sullivan	21–9, 21–13	(gold) Winner
2023	Western Australia Para-Badminton International	Level 2	(Malaysia) Cheah Liek Hou	(India) Hardik Makkar (India) Ruthick Ragupathi	21–17, 19–21, 21–16	(gold) Winner
2023	Japan Para-Badminton International	Level 2	(Malaysia) Cheah Liek Hou	(Malaysia) Mohamad Faris Ahmad Azri (Malaysia) Amyrul Yazid Ahmad Sibi	21–8, 19–21, 21–17	(gold) Winner
2023	Japan Para-Badminton International	Level 2	(Malaysia) Cheah Liek Hou	(China) Li Mingpan (China) Shi Shengzhuo	21–15, 21–9	(gold) Winner
2023	Japan Para-Badminton International	Level 2	(Malaysia) Cheah Liek Hou	(Poland) Bartłomiej Mróz (Singapore) Tay Wei Ming	21–14, 21–15	(gold) Winner
2023	Japan Para-Badminton International	Level 2	(Malaysia) Cheah Liek Hou	(India) Hardik Makkar (India) Ruthick Ragupathi	21–15, 21–17	(gold) Winner
2023	Dubai Para-Badminton International	Level 1	(Malaysia) Cheah Liek Hou	(Chinese Taipei) Fang Jen-yu (Chinese Taipei) Pu Gui-yu	21–1, 21–10	(gold) Winner
2024	Spanish Para-Badminton International II	Level 2	(Malaysia) Cheah Liek Hou	(India) Chirag Baretha (India) Raj Kumar	21–16, 21–19	(gold) Winner
2024	Spanish Para-Badminton International I	Level 1	(Malaysia) Cheah Liek Hou	(India) Hardik Makkar (India) Ruthick Ragupathi	21–16, 22–20	(gold) Winner
