= Raj Kumar (badminton) =

Indian para-badminton player

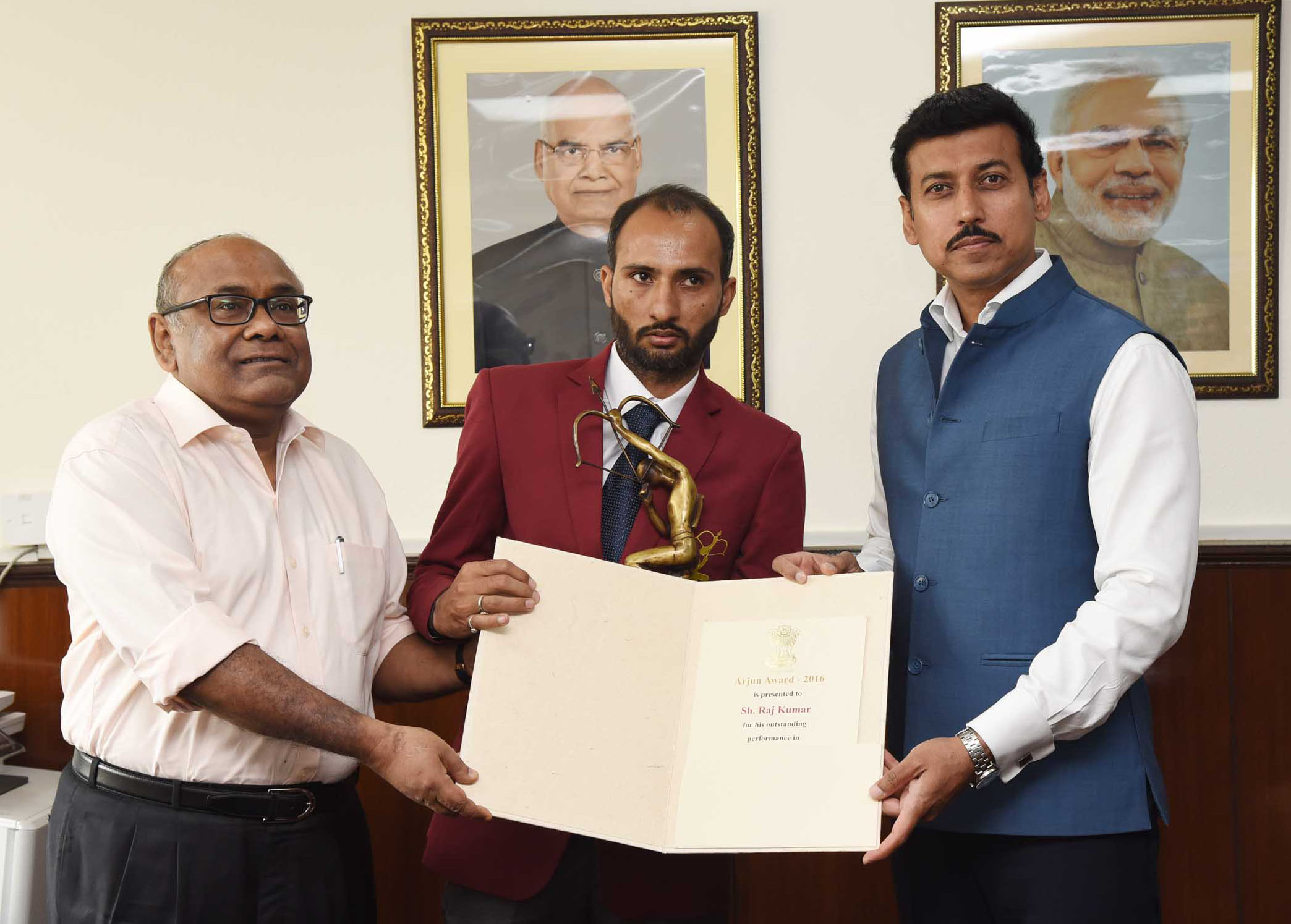

Personal information
- Born: 9 December 1986 (age 39) Punjab, India

Sport
- Country: India
- Sport: Badminton
- Coached by: Gaurav Khanna

Men's singles and doubles SU5 Mixed doubles SL3–SU5
- Highest ranking: 9 (MS 16 May 2019); 1 (MD with Rakesh Pandey 16 May 2019); 1 (MD with Chirag Baretha 8 November 2022); 4 (XD with Parul Parmar 16 March 2022)
- Current ranking: 44 (MS); 1 (MD with Chirag Baretha); 6 (XD with Parul Parmar) (8 November 2022)
Medal record
Men's para-badminton
Representing India
World Championships
Gold medal – first place	2009 Seoul	Men's singles
Gold medal – first place	2009 Seoul	Men's doubles
Gold medal – first place	2015 Stoke Mandeville	Mixed doubles
Silver medal – second place	2024 Pattaya	Men's doubles
Bronze medal – third place	2013 Dortmund	Men's singles
Bronze medal – third place	2015 Stoke Mandeville	Men's singles
Bronze medal – third place	2017 Ulsan	Men's doubles
Bronze medal – third place	2019 Basel	Men's doubles
Bronze medal – third place	2022 Tokyo	Men's doubles
Asian Para Games
Silver medal – second place	2014 Incheon	Men's doubles
Silver medal – second place	2014 Incheon	Mixed doubles
Silver medal – second place	2022 Hangzhou	Men's doubles

Raj Kumar is an Indian para-badminton player from Punjab. He had been ranked world number one in para-badminton men's doubles SU5 in 2019.

== Achievements ==
=== World Championships ===
Men's singles SU5

Year	Venue	Opponent	Score	Result
2009	Olympic Fencing Gymnasium, Seoul, South Korea	(Israel) Eyal Bachar	21–11, 21–9	Gold
2013	Helmut-Körnig-Halle, Dortmund, Germany	(Malaysia) Cheah Liek Hou	17–21, 14–21	Bronze
2015	Stoke Mandeville Stadium, Stoke Mandeville, England	(Poland) Bartłomiej Mróz	9–21, 16–21	Bronze

Men's doubles SU5

Year	Venue	Partner	Opponent	Score	Result
2009	Olympic Fencing Gymnasium, Seoul, South Korea	(India) Rakesh Pandey	(Chinese Taipei) Lin Cheng-che (Chinese Taipei) Lee Meng-yuan	21–16, 11–21, 21–17	Gold
2017	Dongchun Gymnasium, Ulsan, South Korea	(India) Rakesh Pandey	(Indonesia) Suryo Nugroho (Singapore) Tay Wei Ming	10–21, 12–21	Bronze
2019	St. Jakobshalle, Basel, Switzerland	(India) Rakesh Pandey	(China) Shi Shengzhuo (China) He Zhirui	21–17, 12–21, 17–21	Bronze
2022	Yoyogi National Gymnasium, Tokyo, Japan	(India) Chirag Baretha	(Indonesia) Dheva Anrimusthi (Indonesia) Hafizh Briliansyah Prawiranegara	14–21, 15–21	Bronze
2024	Pattaya Exhibition and Convention Hall, Pattaya, Thailand	(India) Chirag Baretha	(Malaysia) Muhammad Fareez Anuar (Malaysia) Cheah Liek Hou	17–21, 18–21	Silver

Mixed doubles SL3–SU5

Year	Venue	Partner	Opponent	Score	Result
2015	Stoke Mandeville Stadium, Stoke Mandeville, England	(India) Parul Parmar	(India) Rakesh Pandey (India) Manasi Girishchandra Joshi	10–21, 12–21	Gold

=== Asian Para Games ===
Men's doubles SU5

Year	Venue	Partner	Opponent	Score	Result
2014	Gyeyang Gymnasium, Incheon, South Korea	(India) Rakesh Pandey	(Malaysia) Cheah Liek Hou (Malaysia) Suhalli Laiman	21–11, 11–21, 13–21	Silver
2022	Binjiang Gymnasium, Hangzhou, China	(India) Chirag Baretha	(Indonesia) Dheva Anrimusthi (Indonesia) Hafizh Briliansyah Prawiranegara	11–21, 21–19, 11–21	Silver

Mixed doubles SL3–SU5

Year	Venue	Partner	Opponent	Score	Result
2014	Gyeyang Gymnasium, Incheon, South Korea	(India) Parul Parmar	(Indonesia) Fredy Setiawan (Indonesia) Leani Ratri Oktila	14–21, 15–21	Silver

=== BWF Para Badminton World Circuit (3 titles, 7 runners-up) ===
The BWF Para Badminton World Circuit – Grade 2, Level 1, 2 and 3 tournaments has been sanctioned by the Badminton World Federation from 2022.

Men's doubles SU5

Year	Tournament	Level	Partner	Opponent	Score	Result
2022	Spanish Para Badminton International II	Level 2	(India) Chirag Baretha	(France) Abdoullah Ait Bella (France) Méril Loquette	21–12, 21–10	(silver) Runner-up
2022	Spanish Para Badminton International I	Level 1	(India) Chirag Baretha	(India) Hardik Makkar (India) Ruthick Ragupathi	19–21, 21–15, 21–16	(gold) Winner
2022	Bahrain Para Badminton International	Level 2	(India) Chirag Baretha	(Malaysia) Muhammad Fareez Anuar (Malaysia) Cheah Liek Hou	14–21, 21–19, 7–21	(silver) Runner-up
2023	Spanish Para Badminton International II	Level 2	(India) Chirag Baretha	(Malaysia) Muhammad Fareez Anuar (Malaysia) Cheah Liek Hou	20–22, 23–21, 15–21	(silver) Runner-up
2023	Spanish Para Badminton International I	Level 1	(India) Chirag Baretha	(India) Hardik Makkar (India) Ruthick Ragupathi	21–12, 21–12	(gold) Winner
2023	Brazil Para Badminton International	Level 2	(India) Chirag Baretha	(Malaysia) Muhammad Fareez Anuar (Malaysia) Cheah Liek Hou	13–21, 18–21	(silver) Runner-up
2023	Bahrain Para Badminton International	Level 2	(India) Chirag Baretha	(Malaysia) Muhammad Fareez Anuar (Malaysia) Cheah Liek Hou	18–21, 21–19, 14–21	(silver) Runner-up
2023	4 Nations Para Badminton International	Level 1	(India) Chirag Baretha	(Malaysia) Muhammad Fareez Anuar (Malaysia) Cheah Liek Hou	21–17, 10–21, 15–21	(silver) Runner-up
2024	Spanish Para Badminton International II	Level 2	(India) Chirag Baretha	(Malaysia) Muhammad Fareez Anuar (Malaysia) Cheah Liek Hou	16–21, 19–21	(silver) Runner-up

Mixed doubles SL3–SU5

Year	Tournament	Level	Partner	Opponent	Score	Result
2022	Spanish Para Badminton International	Level 1	(India) Parul Parmar	(India) Ruthick Ragupathi (India) Manasi Girishchandra Joshi	21–17, 21–18	(gold) Winner

=== International tournaments (from 2011–2021) (5 titles, 4 runners-up) ===
Men's singles SU5

Year	Tournament	Opponent	Score	Result
2019	Uganda Para Badminton International	(India) Chirag Baretha	21–16, 17–21, 18–21	(silver) Runner-up

Men's doubles SU5

Year	Tournament	Partner	Opponent	Score	Result
2019	Dubai Para Badminton International	(India) Rakesh Pandey	(Indonesia) Dheva Anrimusthi (Indonesia) Suryo Nugroho	20–22, 14–21	(silver) Runner-up
2019	Uganda Para Badminton International	(India) Rakesh Pandey	(India) Chirag Baretha (India) Sumith Kumar Garg	21–15, 21–17	(gold) Winner
2019	Canada Para Badminton International	(India) Rakesh Pandey	(South Korea) Kim Gi-yeon (South Korea) Shin Kyung-hwan	21–19, 21–16	(gold) Winner
2019	Denmark Para Badminton International	(India) Rakesh Pandey	(Indonesia) Suryo Nugroho (Indonesia) Fredy Setiawan	14–21, 14–21	(silver) Runner-up
2020	Brazil Para Badminton International	(India) Rakesh Pandey	(Indonesia) Suryo Nugroho (Indonesia) Fredy Setiawan	10–21, 21–8, 10–21	(silver) Runner-up
2020	Peru Para Badminton International	(India) Rakesh Pandey	(France) Méril Loquette (France) Lucas Mazur	21–18, 18–21, 21–16	(gold) Winner
2021	Uganda Para Badminton International	(India) Chirag Baretha	(India) Karan Paneer (India) Ruthick Ragupathi	21–14, 21–14	(gold) Winner

Mixed doubles SL3–SU5

Year	Tournament	Partner	Opponent	Score	Result
2019	Uganda Para Badminton International	(India) Parul Parmar	(France) Guillaume Gailly (Scotland) Mary Margaret Wilson	21–16, 21–12	(gold) Winner

== Awards ==
- Arjuna Award (2016)
