= Ahmed Eldakrory =

Egyptian para-badminton player (born 1988)

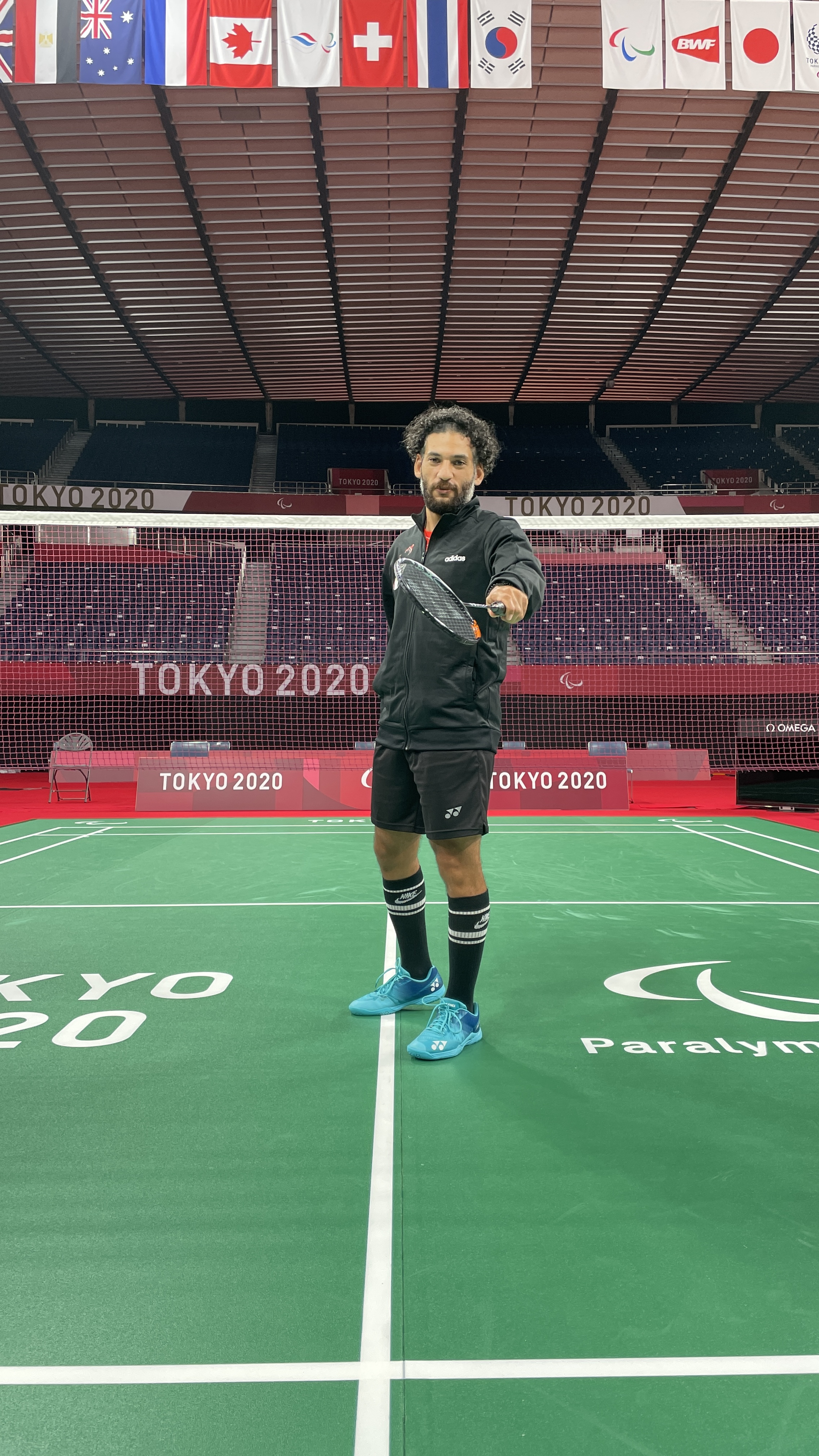
- Ahmed at the 2020 Summer Paralympics

Personal information
- Born: 12 November 1988 (age 37) Kuwait, Kuwait

Sport
- Sport: Badminton
- Handedness: Left

Men's singles and doubles SU5
- Highest ranking: 28 (MS 1 November 2022); 40 (MD with Mohamed Shaaban Ismail 1 November 2022)
Medal record
Men's para-badminton
Representing Egypt
African Championships
Silver medal – second place	2022 Kampala	Men's doubles
Bronze medal – third place	2022 Kampala	Men's singles

Ahmed Magdy Amin Eldakrory (Arabic: أحمد الدكروري; born 12 November 1988) is an Egyptian former para-badminton player and squash coach. In 2020, he represented Egypt in the men's singles SU5 event at the 2020 Summer Paralympics. He was eliminated in the group stages. and in 2024 he is board member of Egyptian Badminton Federation

He won a silver medal in doubles and a bronze in singles at the 2022 African Para-Badminton Championships in Kampala.

== Biography ==
Ahmed has a disability on his right arm. He also competes in squash and runs a squash academy.

== Achievements ==
=== African Championships ===
Men's singles SU5

Year	Venue	Opponent	Score	Result
2022 (Note: This tournament uses a round robin system.)	Lugogo Indoor Stadium, Kampala, Uganda	(Egypt) Mohamed Shaaban Ismail	19–21, 22–24	Bronze
2022	Lugogo Indoor Stadium, Kampala, Uganda	(Uganda) Jonathan Ochan	21–0, 21–5	Bronze
2022	Lugogo Indoor Stadium, Kampala, Uganda	(Democratic Republic of the Congo) Prince Mamvumvu-Kidila	13–21, 10–21	Bronze

Men's doubles SU5

Year	Venue	Partner	Opponent	Score	Result
2022	Lugogo Indoor Stadium, Kampala, Uganda	(Egypt) Mohamed Shaaban Ismail	(Democratic Republic of the Congo) Prince Mamvumvu-Kidila (Uganda) Hassan Mubiru	12–21, 19–21	Silver
2022	Lugogo Indoor Stadium, Kampala, Uganda	(Egypt) Mohamed Shaaban Ismail	(Uganda) Willy Kalinaki (Uganda) Jonathan Ochan	21–14, 21–12	Silver
2022	Lugogo Indoor Stadium, Kampala, Uganda	(Egypt) Mohamed Shaaban Ismail	(Uganda) Kabuye Papias Bagara (Uganda) Hassan Kamoga	21–5, 21–4	Silver
