= Taiyo Imai =

Japanese para-badminton player

Personal information
- Born: 11 August 1998 (age 27) Aichi Prefecture, Japan
- Height: 175 cm (5 ft 9 in)
- Weight: 62 kg (137 lb)

Sport
- Sport: Badminton

Men's singles SU5 Mixed doubles SL3–SU5
- Highest ranking: 2 (MS, 16 August 2022); 2 (XD with Noriko Ito, 12 July 2022)
- Current ranking: 6 (MS); 6 (XD with Noriko Ito) (8 October 2024)
- BWF profile
Medal record
Men's para-badminton
Representing Japan
World Championships
Bronze medal – third place	2017 Ulsan	Men's singles
Bronze medal – third place	2022 Tokyo	Men's singles
Bronze medal – third place	2024 Pattaya	Men's singles
Bronze medal – third place	2026 Manama	Men's singles
Asian Championships
Silver medal – second place	2016 Beijing	Men's singles
Asian Youth Para Games
Gold medal – first place	2017 Dubai	Men's singles
Bronze medal – third place	2017 Dubai	Men's doubles

Taiyo Imai (今井 大湧, Imai Taiyō; born 11 August 1998) is a Japanese para badminton player. He competed in the men singles SU5 event of the 2020 Summer Paralympics.

He won a bronze medal in the men's singles SU5 at the 2017 BWF Para-Badminton World Championships.

== Achievements ==
=== World Championships ===
Men's singles

Year	Venue	Opponent	Score	Result
2017	Dongchun Gymnasium, Ulsan, South Korea	(Malaysia) Cheah Liek Hou	14–21, 8–21	Bronze
2022	Yoyogi National Gymnasium, Tokyo, Japan	(Indonesia) Dheva Anrimusthi	13–21, 12–21	Bronze
2024	Pattaya Exhibition and Convention Hall, Pattaya, Thailand	(Indonesia) Dheva Anrimusthi	20–22, 8–21	Bronze
2026	Isa Sports City, Manama, Bahrain	(Malaysia) Cheah Liek Hou	12–21, 20–22	Bronze

=== Asian Championships ===
Men's singles

Year	Venue	Opponent	Score	Result
2016	China Administration of Sport for Persons with Disabilities, Beijing, China	(Indonesia) Suryo Nugroho	13–21, 7–21	Silver

=== Asian Youth Para Games ===
Men's singles

Year	Venue	Opponent	Score	Result
2017	Al Wasl Club, Dubai, United Arab Emirates	(Indonesia) Dheva Anrimusthi	12–21, 21–17, 21–17	Gold

Men's doubles

Year	Venue	Partner	Opponent	Score	Result
2017	Al Wasl Club, Dubai, United Arab Emirates	(Japan) Kaito Nakamura	(Indonesia) Dheva Anrimusthi (Indonesia) Arya Sadewa	16–21, 16–21	Bronze

=== BWF Para Badminton World Circuit (2 titles, 3 runners-up) ===
The BWF Para Badminton World Circuit – Grade 2, Level 1, 2 and 3 tournaments has been sanctioned by the Badminton World Federation from 2022.

Men's singles

Year	Tournament	Level	Opponent	Score	Result
2022	Spanish Para Badminton International	Level 1	(France) Méril Loquette	21–18, 21–18	(gold) Winner
2022	Dubai Para Badminton International	Level 2	(Malaysia) Cheah Liek Hou	11–21, 19–21	(silver) Runner-up
2022	4 Nations Para Badminton International	Level 1	(Malaysia) Cheah Liek Hou	17–21, 16–21	(silver) Runner-up

Mixed doubles

Year	Tournament	Level	Partner	Opponent	Score	Result
2022	Dubai Para Badminton International	Level 2	(Japan) Noriko Ito	(Indonesia) Fredy Setiawan (Indonesia) Khalimatus Sadiyah	11–21, 21–18, 7–21	(silver) Runner-up
2022	Canada Para Badminton International	Level 1	(Japan) Noriko Ito	(Japan) Daisuke Fujihara (Japan) Akiko Sugino	21–16, 21–10	(gold) Winner

=== International Tournaments (4 titles, 7 runners-up) ===
Men's singles

Year	Tournament	Opponent	Score	Result
2016	Irish Para Badminton International	(Malaysia) Cheah Liek Hou	26–24, 9–21, 14–21	(silver) Runner-up
2017	Thailand Para Badminton International	(Malaysia) Cheah Liek Hou	13–21, 16–21	(silver) Runner-up
2017	Peru Para Badminton International	(Japan) Gen Shogaki	21–9, 18–21, 21–19	(gold) Winner
2018	Brazil Para Badminton International	(Poland) Bartłomiej Mróz	21–19, 10–21, 8–21	(silver) Runner-up
2018	Japan Para Badminton International	(Poland) Bartłomiej Mróz	21–14, 21–11	(gold) Winner
2018	Australia Para Badminton International	(Indonesia) Suryo Nugroho	21–14, 20–22, 10–21	(silver) Runner-up

Men's doubles

Year	Tournament	Partner	Opponent	Score	Result
2017 (Note: This tournament uses a round robin system.)	Peru Para Badminton International	(Japan) Gen Shogaki	(Peru) Esteban Isael (Peru) César Suárez	21–3, 21–3	(gold) Winner
2017	Peru Para Badminton International	(Japan) Gen Shogaki	(Brazil) Ricardo Cavalli (Brazil) Eduardo Oliveira	21–11, 21–7	(gold) Winner
2017	Peru Para Badminton International	(Japan) Gen Shogaki	(Japan) Hironobu Kawabata (Japan) Tetsuo Ura	21–12, 21–19	(gold) Winner
2017	Peru Para Badminton International	(Japan) Gen Shogaki	(Brazil) Geraldo da Silva Oliveira (Brazil) Genivaldo Duarte	21–7, 21–0	(gold) Winner
2017	USA Para Badminton International	(Japan) Tetsuo Ura	(Malaysia) Cheah Liek Hou (Malaysia) Hairol Fozi Saaba	14–21, 21–23	(silver) Runner-up
2018	Spanish Para Badminton International	(Turkey) İlker Tuzcu	(South Korea) Kim Gi-yeon (South Korea) Shin Kyung-hwan	23–25, 21–10, 21–19	(gold) Winner
2018 (Note: This tournament uses a round robin system.)	Australia Para Badminton International	(Japan) Hironobu Kawabata	(Japan) Gen Shogaki (Japan) Tetsuo Ura	17–21, 17–21	(silver) Runner-up
2018	Australia Para Badminton International	(Japan) Hironobu Kawabata	(Chinese Taipei) Pu Gui-yu (Chinese Taipei) Yeh En-chuan	21–16, 21–9	(silver) Runner-up
2018	Australia Para Badminton International	(Japan) Hironobu Kawabata	(England) James Binnie (England) Antony Forster	21–10, 21–13	(silver) Runner-up
2018	Australia Para Badminton International	(Japan) Hironobu Kawabata	(India) Sugil Abbas (Indonesia) Suryo Nugroho	21–18, 21–13	(silver) Runner-up

Mixed doubles

Year	Tournament	Partner	Opponent	Score	Result
2018	Brazil Para Badminton International	(Japan) Asami Yamada	(Japan) Toshiaki Suenaga (Japan) Akiko Sugino	9–21, 17–21	(silver) Runner-up
