= Badminton at the 2023 European Para Championships – Mixed doubles SL3–SU5 =

Badminton's mixed doubles SL3–SU5 at the 2023 European Para Championships
- Venue: Rotterdam Ahoy, Rotterdam
- Dates: 15 – 20 August
- Competitors: 36 from 15 nations

Medalists
gold medal	Lucas Mazur; Faustine Noël	France
silver medal	Rickard Nilsson; Helle Sofie Sagøy	Mixed-NOCs
bronze medal	Mathieu Thomas; Maud Lefort	France
bronze medal	Méril Loquette; Coraline Bergeron	France

The mixed doubles SL3–SU5 badminton tournament at the 2023 European Para Championships was played from 15 to 20 August 2023 in Rotterdam Ahoy, Rotterdam. A total of 18 pairs competed at the tournament, six of whom was seeded.

== Competition schedule ==
Play took place between 15 and 20 August.

GS	Group stage	R16	Round of 16	¼	Quarterfinals	½	Semifinals	F	Final

Events	Tue 15	Wed 16	Thu 17	Fri 18		Sat 19	Sun 20
Mixed doubles SL3–SU5	GS	GS	GS	R16	¼	½	F

== Seeds ==
The following players were seeded:

1. Lucas Mazur / Faustine Noël (FRA) (champion; gold medalist)
2. Méril Loquette / Coraline Bergeron (FRA) (semi-finals; bronze medalist)
3. Jan-Niklas Pott / Katrin Seibert (GER) (quarter-finals)
4. Mathieu Thomas / Maud Lefort (FRA) (semi-finals; bronze medalist)
5. Oleksandr Chyrkov / Ivanna Redka (UKR) (quarter-finals)
6. Rickard Nilsson (SWE) / Helle Sofie Sagøy (NOR) (final; silver medalist)

== Group stage ==
=== Group A ===
Pos	Team	Pld	W	L	GF	GA	GD	PF	PA	PD	Qualification
1	Lucas Mazur (FRA) Faustine Noël (FRA) [1]	2	2	0	4	0	+4	84	32	+52	Qualification to elimination stage
2	Fuat Soruklu (TUR) Tuğçe Çelik (TUR)	2	1	1	2	2	0	60	84	−24	Qualification to elimination stage
3	Antony Forster (GBR) Emma Stoner (GBR)	2	0	2	0	4	−4	62	90	−28	

Source: Group A – standings

Date		Score		Game 1	Game 2	Game 3
15 August	Antony Forster (United Kingdom); Emma Stoner (United Kingdom)	0–2	(Turkey) Fuat Soruklu (Turkey) Tuğçe Çelik	25–27	17–21	
16 August	Lucas Mazur (France); Faustine Noël (France)	2–0	(United Kingdom) Antony Forster (United Kingdom) Emma Stoner	21–9	21–11	
17 August	Lucas Mazur (France); Faustine Noël (France)	2–0	(Turkey) Fuat Soruklu (Turkey) Tuğçe Çelik	21–7	21–5	

=== Group B ===
Pos	Team	Pld	W	L	GF	GA	GD	PF	PA	PD	Qualification
1	Méril Loquette (FRA) Coraline Bergeron (FRA) [2]	2	2	0	4	0	+4	85	56	+29	Qualification to elimination stage
2	Colin Leslie (GBR) Cathrine Rosengren (DEN)	2	1	1	2	2	0	75	74	+1	Qualification to elimination stage
3	Mustafa Tuğra Nur (TUR) Zehra Bağlar (TUR)	2	0	2	0	4	−4	54	84	−30	

Source: Group B – standings

Date		Score		Game 1	Game 2	Game 3
15 August	Colin Leslie (United Kingdom); Cathrine Rosengren (Denmark)	2–0	(Turkey) Mustafa Tuğra Nur (Turkey) Zehra Bağlar	21–17	21–14	
16 August	Méril Loquette (France); Coraline Bergeron (France)	2–0	(United Kingdom) Colin Leslie (Denmark) Cathrine Rosengren	21–13	22–20	
17 August	Méril Loquette (France); Coraline Bergeron (France)	2–0	(Turkey) Mustafa Tuğra Nur (Turkey) Zehra Bağlar	21–13	21–10	

=== Group C ===
Pos	Team	Pld	W	L	GF	GA	GD	PF	PA	PD	Qualification
1	Jan-Niklas Pott (GER) Katrin Seibert (GER) [3/4]	2	2	0	4	1	+3	105	70	+35	Qualification to elimination stage
2	Diogo Daniel (POR) Inoi Ferreira (POR)	2	1	1	3	2	+1	93	91	+2	Qualification to elimination stage
3	Sean O'Sullivan (GBR) Cambell Plant (GBR)	2	0	2	0	4	−4	47	84	−37	

Source: Group C – standings

Date		Score		Game 1	Game 2	Game 3
15 August	Diogo Daniel (Portugal); Inoi Ferreira (Portugal)	2–0	(United Kingdom) Sean O'Sullivan (United Kingdom) Cambell Plant	21–16	21–12	
16 August	Jan-Niklas Pott (Germany); Katrin Seibert (Germany)	2–1	(Portugal) Diogo Daniel (Portugal) Inoi Ferreira	21–12	21–23	21–16
17 August	Jan-Niklas Pott (Germany); Katrin Seibert (Germany)	2–0	(United Kingdom) Sean O'Sullivan (United Kingdom) Cambell Plant	21–14	21–5	

=== Group D ===
Pos	Team	Pld	W	L	GF	GA	GD	PF	PA	PD	Qualification
1	Mathieu Thomas (FRA) Maud Lefort (FRA) [3/4]	2	2	0	4	0	+4	84	30	+54	Qualification to elimination stage
2	Maurin Stübl (SUI) Beatriz Monteiro (POR)	2	1	1	2	2	0	60	70	−10	Qualification to elimination stage
3	Alex Santamaria (ESP) Cristina Sánchez (ESP)	2	0	2	0	4	−4	40	84	−44	

Source: Group D – standings

Date		Score		Game 1	Game 2	Game 3
15 August	Maurin Stübl (Switzerland); Beatriz Monteiro (Portugal)	2–0	(Spain) Alex Santamaria (Spain) Cristina Sánchez	21–17	21–11	
16 August	Mathieu Thomas (France); Maud Lefort (France)	2–0	(Switzerland) Maurin Stübl (Portugal) Beatriz Monteiro	21–9	21–9	
17 August	Mathieu Thomas (France); Maud Lefort (France)	2–0	(Spain) Alex Santamaria (Spain) Cristina Sánchez	21–8	21–4	

=== Group E ===
Pos	Team	Pld	W	L	GF	GA	GD	PF	PA	PD	Qualification
1	Oleksandr Chyrkov (UKR) Ivanna Redka (UKR) [5/6]	2	1	1	2	2	0	73	65	+8	Qualification to elimination stage
2	İlker Tuzcu (TUR) Halime Yıldız (TUR)	2	2	0	4	0	+4	84	50	+34	Qualification to elimination stage
3	Ibrahim Aliyev (AZE) Emona Ivanova (BUL)	2	0	2	0	4	−4	42	84	−42	

Source: Group E – standings

Date		Score		Game 1	Game 2	Game 3
15 August	İlker Tuzcu (Turkey); Halime Yıldız (Turkey)	2–0	(Azerbaijan) Ibrahim Aliyev (Bulgaria) Emona Ivanova	21–10	21–9	
16 August	Oleksandr Chyrkov (Ukraine); Ivanna Redka (Ukraine)	0–2	(Turkey) İlker Tuzcu (Turkey) Halime Yıldız	16–21	15–21	
17 August	Oleksandr Chyrkov (Ukraine); Ivanna Redka (Ukraine)	2–0	(Azerbaijan) Ibrahim Aliyev (Bulgaria) Emona Ivanova	21–7	21–16	

=== Group F ===
Pos	Team	Pld	W	L	GF	GA	GD	PF	PA	PD	Qualification
1	Rickard Nilsson (SWE) Helle Sofie Sagøy (NOR) [5/6]	2	2	0	4	0	+4	84	40	+44	Qualification to elimination stage
2	Dominik Bützberger (SUI) Sophie van den Broek (NED)	2	1	1	2	2	0	60	75	−15	Qualification to elimination stage
3	Dimitar Pavlov (BUL) Rosa De Marco (ITA)	2	0	2	0	4	−4	55	84	−29	

Source: Group F – standings

Date		Score		Game 1	Game 2	Game 3
15 August	Dominik Bützberger (Switzerland); Sophie van den Broek (Netherlands)	2–0	(Bulgaria) Dimitar Pavlov (Italy) Rosa De Marco	21–18	21–15	
16 August	Rickard Nilsson (Sweden); Helle Sofie Sagøy (Norway)	2–0	(Switzerland) Dominik Bützberger (Netherlands) Sophie van den Broek	21–6	21–12	
17 August	Rickard Nilsson (Sweden); Helle Sofie Sagøy (Norway)	2–0	(Bulgaria) Dimitar Pavlov (Italy) Rosa De Marco	21–9	21–13	

== Elimination stage ==
Round of 16
Colin Leslie (GBR); Cathrine Rosengren (DEN)	21	21
Maurin Stübl (SUI); Beatriz Monteiro (POR)	10	16
İlker Tuzcu (TUR); Halime Yıldız (TUR)	21	21
Dominik Bützberger (SUI); Sophie van den Broek (NED)	11	10
Diogo Daniel (POR); Inoi Ferreira (POR)	9	5
5/6	Rickard Nilsson (SWE); Helle Sofie Sagøy (NOR)	21	21
5/6	Oleksandr Chyrkov (UKR); Ivanna Redka (UKR)	21	21
Fuat Soruklu (TUR); Tuğçe Çelik (TUR)	11	18

Quarter-finals
1	Lucas Mazur (FRA); Faustine Noël (FRA)	21	21
Colin Leslie (GBR); Cathrine Rosengren (DEN)	13	13
3/4	Mathieu Thomas (FRA); Maud Lefort (FRA)	21	18	21
İlker Tuzcu (TUR); Halime Yıldız (TUR)	19	21	7
5/6	Rickard Nilsson (SWE); Helle Sofie Sagøy (NOR)	21	21
3/4	Jan-Niklas Pott (GER); Katrin Seibert (GER)	16	19
5/6	Oleksandr Chyrkov (UKR); Ivanna Redka (UKR)	11	21	9
2	Méril Loquette (FRA); Coraline Bergeron (FRA)	21	16	21

Semi-finals
1	Lucas Mazur (FRA); Faustine Noël (FRA)	21	21
3/4	Mathieu Thomas (FRA); Maud Lefort (FRA)	19	19
5/6	Rickard Nilsson (SWE); Helle Sofie Sagøy (NOR)	21	21
2	Méril Loquette (FRA); Coraline Bergeron (FRA)	18	18

Final
1	Lucas Mazur (FRA); Faustine Noël (FRA)	21	21
5/6	Rickard Nilsson (SWE); Helle Sofie Sagøy (NOR)	14	14
