= Valeska Knoblauch =

German para-badminton player

Personal information
- Born: 21 September 1990 (age 36) Bonn, Germany

Sport
- Country: Germany
- Sport: Badminton
- Handedness: Right

Women’s singles WH1 Women's doubles WH1–WH2 Mixed doubles WH1–WH2
- Highest ranking: 1 (WS 26 March 2019); 8 (WD with Elke Rongen 1 January 2019); 4 (XD with Young-chin Mi 27 August 2019)
- BWF profile
Medal record
Para-badminton
Representing Germany
World Championships
Bronze medal – third place	2013 Dortmund	Women's doubles
Bronze medal – third place	2013 Dortmund	Mixed doubles
Bronze medal – third place	2019 Basel	Mixed doubles
European Championships
Gold medal – first place	2018 Rodez	Women's singles
Silver medal – second place	2014 Murcia	Women's singles
Silver medal – second place	2014 Murcia	Women's doubles
Silver medal – second place	2016 Beek	Women's singles
Silver medal – second place	2016 Beek	Women's doubles
Bronze medal – third place	2012 Dortmund	Women's doubles
Bronze medal – third place	2012 Dortmund	Mixed doubles
Bronze medal – third place	2016 Beek	Mixed doubles
Bronze medal – third place	2018 Rodez	Women's doubles
Bronze medal – third place	2018 Rodez	Mixed doubles

Valeska Knoblauch (born 21 September 1990) is a German para-badminton player who competes in international badminton competitions. She is a European singles champion and has competed at the 2020 Summer Paralympics where she reached the quarterfinals in the women's singles WH1.

== Early life ==
Knoblauch was a very keen dancer in her younger years. When Knoblauch was fourteen years old, she jumped onto a windowsill in a classroom at her high school. She leaned back and fell out, she broke her spine and became a paraplegic since then. She went back to school four years later and started to play badminton as part of her rehabilitation.

== Achievements ==
=== World Championships ===
Women's doubles WH1–WH2
Year	Venue	Partner	Opponent	Score	Result
2013	Helmut-Körnig-Halle; Dortmund, Germany	(Germany) Elke Rongen	(South Korea) Lee Sun-ae (South Korea) Son Ok-cha	13–21, 12–21	Bronze

Mixed doubles WH1–WH2
Year	Venue	Partner	Opponent	Score	Result
2013	Helmut-Körnig-Halle; Dortmund, Germany	(Germany) Young-chin Mi	(Thailand) Jakarin Homhual (Thailand) Sujirat Pookkham	8–21, 12–21	Bronze
2019	St. Jakobshalle; Basel, Switzerland	(Germany) Young-chin Mi	(China) Yang Tong (China) Li Hongyan	6–21, 10–21	Bronze

=== European Championships ===
Women's singles WH1
Year	Venue	Opponent	Score	Result
2014	High Performance Center, Murcia, Spain	(Switzerland) Karin Suter-Erath	9–21, 5–21	Silver
2016	Sporthal de Haamen, Beek, Netherlands	(Switzerland) Karin Suter-Erath	11–21, 21–17, 12–21	Silver
2018	Amphitheatre Gymnasium, Rodez, France	(Switzerland) Karin Suter-Erath	12–21, 21–19, 28–26	Gold

Women's doubles WH1–WH2
Year	Venue	Partner	Opponent	Score	Result
2012	Helmut-Körnig-Halle; Dortmund, Germany	(Germany) Elke Rongen	(Switzerland) Sonja Häsler (Switzerland) Karin Suter-Erath	20–22, 8–21	Bronze
2014	High Performance Center; Murcia, Spain	(Germany) Elke Rongen	(Switzerland) Sonja Häsler (Switzerland) Karin Suter-Erath	17–21, 21–18, 12–21	Silver
2016	Sporthal de Haamen; Beek, Netherlands	(Germany) Elke Rongen	(Turkey) Emine Seçkin (Switzerland) Karin Suter-Erath	12–21, 8–21	Silver
2018	Amphitheatre Gymnasium; Rodez, France	(Germany) Elke Rongen	(Switzerland) Cynthia Mathez (Switzerland) Karin Suter-Erath	16–21, 16–21	Bronze

Mixed doubles WH1–WH2
Year	Venue	Partner	Opponent	Score	Result
2012	Helmut-Körnig-Halle; Dortmund, Germany	(Germany) Young-chin Mi	(France) David Toupé (Switzerland) Sonja Häsler	6–21, 12–21	Bronze
2016	Sporthal de Haamen; Beek, Netherlands	(Germany) Young-chin Mi	(France) David Toupé (Turkey) Narin Uluç	13–21, 21–13, 18–21	Bronze
2018	Amphitheatre Gymnasium; Rodez, France	(Germany) Young-chin Mi	(Russia) Konstantin Afinogenov (Turkey) Emine Seçkin	18–21, 21–13, 18–21	Bronze

=== International tournaments (2011–2021) (7 titles, 16 runners-up) ===
Women's singles WH1

Year	Tournament	Opponent	Score	Result
2016	Irish Para-Badminton International	(Switzerland) Karin Suter-Erath	7–21, 9–21	(silver) Runner-up
2018	Irish Para-Badminton International	(Switzerland) Karin Suter-Erath	22–20, 21–16	(gold) Winner
2018	Denmark Para-Badminton International	(Belgium) To Man-kei	21–16, 21–13	(gold) Winner
2019	Uganda Para-Badminton International	Nina Gorodetzky	21–10, 21–16	(gold) Winner
2019	Canada Para-Badminton International	(Switzerland) Karin Suter-Erath	21–12, 21–6	(gold) Winner
2019	Thailand Para-Badminton International	(Japan) Sarina Satomi	17–21, 13–21	(silver) Runner-up
2019 (Note: This tournament uses a round robin system.)	China Para-Badminton International	(Japan) Sarina Satomi	13–21, 21–17, 12–21	(silver) Runner-up
2019	China Para-Badminton International	(China) Zhang Jing	24–22, 21–16	(silver) Runner-up
2019	China Para-Badminton International	(Belgium) To Man-kei	21–9, 21–9	(silver) Runner-up
2019	China Para-Badminton International	(China) Yin Menglu	21–14, 21–18	(silver) Runner-up
2019	Denmark Para-Badminton International	(Thailand) Sujirat Pookkham	20–22, 8–21	(silver) Runner-up
2020	Peru Para-Badminton International	(Japan) Ikumi Fuke	21–15, 21–17	(gold) Winner
2021	Spanish Para-Badminton International	(Thailand) Sujirat Pookkham	16–21, 7–21	(silver) Runner-up

Women's doubles WH1–WH2

Year	Tournament	Partner	Opponent	Score	Result
2012	Spanish Para-Badminton International	(Thailand) Sujirat Pookkham	(Switzerland) Sonja Häsler (Switzerland) Karin Suter-Erath	17–21, 19–21	(silver) Runner-up
2012	Spanish Para-Badminton International	(Thailand) Sujirat Pookkham	(Spain) Maria Begoña Gago (Spain) Sofía Balsalobre	21–8, 21–13	(silver) Runner-up
2012	Spanish Para-Badminton International	(Thailand) Sujirat Pookkham	(Turkey) Mine Korkmaz (Turkey) Emine Seçkin	21–10, 21–15	(silver) Runner-up
2015	Spanish Para-Badminton International	(Germany) Elke Rongen	(Spain) Amalia López (India) Kartiki Patel	21–7, 21–3	(silver) Runner-up
2015	Spanish Para-Badminton International	(Germany) Elke Rongen	(Belgium) Kristel Gevaert (France) Paméla Masse	21–7, 21–11	(silver) Runner-up
2015	Spanish Para-Badminton International	(Germany) Elke Rongen	(Russia) Liliia Prokofeva (Switzerland) Karin Suter-Erath	14–21, 12–21	(silver) Runner-up
2016	Irish Para-Badminton International	(Germany) Elke Rongen	(Japan) Etsuko Kobayashi (Japan) Yuma Yamazaki	21–19, 12–21, 21–16	(gold) Winner
2017	Spanish Para-Badminton International	(Germany) Elke Rongen	(South Korea) Kim Dae-young (South Korea) Kim Seung-suk	15–21, 10–21	(silver) Runner-up
2017	Japan Para-Badminton International	(Germany) Elke Rongen	(Thailand) Sujirat Pookkham (Thailand) Amnouy Wetwithan	10–21, 6–21	(silver) Runner-up
2018	Irish Para-Badminton International	(Germany) Elke Rongen	(Canada) Yuka Chokyu (Scotland) Fiona Christie	17–21, 21–15, 21–10	(gold) Winner
2018	Irish Para-Badminton International	(Germany) Elke Rongen	(Russia) Liusia Ignatenko (Russia) Irina Kuzmenko	21–9, 21–15	(gold) Winner
2018	Irish Para-Badminton International	(Germany) Elke Rongen	(Switzerland) Cynthia Mathez (Switzerland) Karin Suter-Erath	19–21, 21–16, 21–13	(gold) Winner
2018	Denmark Para-Badminton International	(Germany) Elke Rongen	(Austria) Henriett Koósz (Spain) Marcela Quinteros	12–21, 18–21	(silver) Runner-up
2019	Uganda Para-Badminton International	(Germany) Elke Rongen	(Peru) Pilar Jáuregui (Austria) Henriett Koósz	21–18, 15–21, 17–21	(silver) Runner-up
2020	Peru Para-Badminton International	(Peru) Pilar Jáuregui	(Turkey) Emine Seçkin (Belgium) To Man-kei	14–21, 19–21	(silver) Runner-up

Mixed doubles WH1–WH2

Year	Tournament	Partner	Opponent	Score	Result
2013	French Para-Badminton International	(Germany) Young-chin Mi	(Germany) Marc Jung (Germany) Elke Rongen	21–10, 21–7	(silver) Runner-up
2013	French Para-Badminton International	(Germany) Young-chin Mi	(France) Pascal Barrillon (Spain) Sofía Balsalobre	21–14, 23–21	(silver) Runner-up
2013	French Para-Badminton International	(Germany) Young-chin Mi	(France) David Toupé (Switzerland) Sonja Häsler	11–21, 14–21	(silver) Runner-up
2016	Irish Para-Badminton International	(Germany) Young-chin Mi	(England) Martin Rooke (Switzerland) Karin Suter-Erath	12–21, 12–21	(silver) Runner-up
2018	Denmark Para-Badminton International	(Germany) Young-chin Mi	(Brazil) Marcelo Alves Conceição (Spain) Marcela Quinteros	19–21, 21–11, 11–21	(silver) Runner-up
2019	Uganda Para-Badminton International	(Germany) Young-chin Mi	(Russia) Konstantin Afinogenov (Turkey) Emine Seçkin	20–22, 21–19, 17–21	(silver) Runner-up
