= Young-Chin Mi =

German para-badminton player

Personal information
- Full name: Young-Chin Peter Mi
- Born: 6 June 1979 (age 47) Castrop-Rauxel, Germany

Sport
- Country: Germany
- Sport: Badminton
- Handedness: Right

Men’s singles WH1 Men's doubles WH1–WH2
- Highest ranking: 6 (MS 7 January 2020); 9 (XD with Thomas Wandschneider 19 April 2021); 4 (XD with Valeska Knoblauch 29 August 2019)
Medal record
Men's para-badminton
Representing Germany
World Championships
Bronze medal – third place	2013 Dortmund	Mixed doubles
Bronze medal – third place	2019 Basel	Mixed doubles
European Championships
Bronze medal – third place	2012 Dortmund	Men's doubles
Bronze medal – third place	2012 Dortmund	Mixed doubles
Bronze medal – third place	2014 Murcia	Men's singles
Bronze medal – third place	2014 Murcia	Men's singles
Bronze medal – third place	2016 Beek	Men's doubles
Bronze medal – third place	2016 Beek	Mixed doubles
Bronze medal – third place	2018 Rodez	Men's singles
Bronze medal – third place	2018 Rodez	Men's doubles
Bronze medal – third place	2018 Rodez	Mixed doubles

Young-Chin Peter Mi (born 6 June 1979) is a German former para-badminton player. He was part of the German para-badminton team that competed in the 2020 Summer Paralympics in Tokyo.

He competed in the men's singles WH1 event and the men's doubles WH1–WH2 event alongside his partner Thomas Wandschneider but did not get past the group stages.

== Biography ==
Young-Chin Mi was diagnosed with paraplegia after a traffic accident in southern France in 2005. Before the accident, he was active in football, hapkido, swimming and jogging. Through an internet search, he joined the RBG Dortmund sports club, where he was introduced to para-badminton and has been playing the sport since 2008.

== Achievements ==
=== World Championships ===
Mixed doubles WH1–WH2
Year	Venue	Partner	Opponent	Score	Result
2013	Helmut-Körnig-Halle; Dortmund, Germany	(Germany) Valeska Knoblauch	(Thailand) Jakarin Homhual (Thailand) Sujirat Pookkham	8–21, 12–21	Bronze
2019	St. Jakobshalle; Basel, Switzerland	(Germany) Valeska Knoblauch	(China) Yang Tong (China) Li Hongyan	6–21, 10–21	Bronze

=== European Championships ===
Men's singles WH1
Year	Venue	Opponent	Score	Result
2014	High Performance Center, Murcia, Spain	(France) David Toupé	21–13, 12–21, 7–21	Bronze
2018	Amphitheatre Gymnasium, Rodez, France	(France) David Toupé	8–21, 7–21	Bronze

Men's doubles WH1–WH2
Year	Venue	Partner	Opponent	Score	Result
2012	Helmut-Körnig-Halle; Dortmund, Germany	(France) Sébastien Martin	(France) Pascal Barrillon (France) David Toupé	6–21, 11–21	Bronze
2014	High Performance Center; Murcia, Spain	(Netherlands) Jordy Brouwer	(Turkey) Avni Kertmen (England) Martin Rooke	10–21, 21–23	Bronze
2016	Sporthal de Haamen; Beek, Netherlands	(Germany) David Holz	(England) Martin Rooke (France) David Toupé	16–21, 10–21	Bronze
2018	Amphitheatre Gymnasium; Rodez, France	(Germany) Rick Hellmann	(England) Martin Rooke (Germany) Thomas Wandschneider	14–21, 19–21	Bronze

Mixed doubles WH1–WH2
Year	Venue	Partner	Opponent	Score	Result
2012	Helmut-Körnig-Halle; Dortmund, Germany	(Germany) Valeska Knoblauch	(France) David Toupé (Switzerland) Sonja Häsler	6–21, 12–21	Bronze
2016	Sporthal de Haamen; Beek, Netherlands	(Germany) Valeska Knoblauch	(France) David Toupé (Turkey) Narin Uluç	13–21, 21–13, 18–21	Bronze
2018	Amphitheatre Gymnasium; Rodez, France	(Germany) Valeska Knoblauch	(Russia) Konstantin Afinogenov (Turkey) Emine Seçkin	18–21, 21–13, 18–21	Bronze

=== International tournaments (from 2011–2021) (5 runners-up) ===
Men's doubles WH1–WH2
Year	Tournament	Partner	Opponent	Score	Result
2019	Denmark Para-Badminton International	(Germany) Thomas Wandschneider	(Japan) Daiki Kajiwara (Japan) Hiroshi Murayama	12–21, 9–21	(silver) Runner-up

Mixed doubles WH1–WH2

Year	Tournament	Partner	Opponent	Score	Result
2012	French Para-Badminton International	(Germany) Valeska Knoblauch	(Germany) Marc Jung (Germany) Elke Rongen	21–10, 21–7	(silver) Runner-up
2012	French Para-Badminton International	(Germany) Valeska Knoblauch	(France) Pascal Barrillon (Spain) Sofía Balsalobre	21–14, 23–21	(silver) Runner-up
2012	French Para-Badminton International	(Germany) Valeska Knoblauch	(France) David Toupé (Switzerland) Sonja Häsler	11–21, 14–21	(silver) Runner-up
2015	Spanish Para-Badminton International	(Germany) Valeska Knoblauch	(England) Martin Rooke (Switzerland) Karin Suter-Erath	12–21, 12–21	(silver) Runner-up
2018	Denmark Para-Badminton International	(Germany) Valeska Knoblauch	(Brazil) Marcelo Alves Conceição (Spain) Marcela Quinteros	19–21, 21–11, 11–21	(silver) Runner-up
2019	Uganda Para-Badminton International	(Germany) Valeska Knoblauch	(Russia) Konstantin Afinogenov (Turkey) Emine Seçkin	20–22, 21–19, 17–21	(silver) Runner-up
