= Helle Sofie Sagøy =

Norwegian para badminton player (born 1998)

Personal information
- Born: 19 January 1998 (age 28) Klæbu Municipality, Trøndelag, Norway
- Height: 163 cm (5 ft 4 in)

Sport
- Country: Norway
- Sport: Badminton
- Coached by: Sonja Wåland

Women's singles SL4 Women's doubles SL3–SU5 Mixed doubles SL3–SU5
- Highest ranking: 1 (WS 19 July 2022); 2 (WD with Katrin Seibert 1 January 2019); 8 (XD with Rickard Nilsson 15 March 2022)
- Current ranking: 1 (WS) (24 September 2024)
Medal record
Para badminton
Representing Norway
Paralympic Games
Bronze medal – third place	2024 Paris	Women's singles
World Championships
Gold medal – first place	2013 Dortmund	Women's doubles
Gold medal – first place	2015 Stoke Mandeville	Women's singles
Gold medal – first place	2015 Stoke Mandeville	Women's doubles
Gold medal – first place	2022 Tokyo	Women's singles
Silver medal – second place	2013 Dortmund	Women's singles
Bronze medal – third place	2019 Basel	Women's singles
Bronze medal – third place	2024 Pattaya	Women's singles
Bronze medal – third place	2026 Manama	Women's singles
European Para Championships
Gold medal – first place	2023 Rotterdam	Women's singles
Silver medal – second place	2023 Rotterdam	Mixed doubles
European Championships
Gold medal – first place	2014 Murcia	Women's singles
Gold medal – first place	2014 Murcia	Mixed doubles
Gold medal – first place	2018 Rodez	Women's singles
Gold medal – first place	2018 Rodez	Women's doubles
Gold medal – first place	2025 Istanbul	Women's singles
Gold medal – first place	2025 Istanbul	Women's doubles
Gold medal – first place	2025 Istanbul	Mixed doubles
Bronze medal – third place	2018 Rodez	Mixed doubles

Helle Sofie Sagøy (born 19 January 1998) is a Norwegian para-badminton player. She is a Paralympic bronze medallist, four-time world champion and eight-time European champion, with one European Para Championships title and seven European Championships titles. Sagøy was born without her right lower leg and has used a prosthetic all her life. She was awarded the BWF Para-Badminton Player of the Year in 2015 after winning two gold medals at the 2015 World Championships.

Sagøy made her Paralympic debut at the 2020 Summer Paralympics, where she placed fourth in the women's singles event. She won the bronze medal in the women's single event at the 2024 Summer Paralympics, where she became the first Norwegian to medal in para-badminton at the Paralympic Games.

== Achievements ==
=== Paralympic Games ===
Women's singles

Year	Venue	Opponent	Score	Result
2024	Porte de La Chapelle Arena, Paris, France	(Indonesia) Khalimatus Sadiyah	21–10, 21–14	Bronze

=== World Championships ===
Women's singles

Year	Venue	Opponent	Score	Result
2013	Helmut-Körnig-Halle, Dortmund, Germany	(India) Parul Parmar	19–21, 6–21	Silver
2015	Stoke Mandeville Stadium, Stoke Mandeville, England	(France) Faustine Noël	21–18, 21–17	Gold
2019	St. Jakobshalle, Basel, Switzerland	(Indonesia) Leani Ratri Oktila	7–21, 8–21	Bronze
2022	Yoyogi National Gymnasium, Tokyo, Japan	(Japan) Haruka Fujino	21–9, 19–21, 21–10	Gold
2024	Pattaya Exhibition and Convention Hall, Pattaya, Thailand	(China) Cheng Hefang	13–21, 19–21	Bronze
2026	Isa Sports City, Manama, Bahrain	(Indonesia) Leani Ratri Oktila	9–21, 18–21	Bronze

Women's doubles

Year	Venue	Partner	Opponent	Score	Result
2013 (Note: This tournament uses a round robin system.)	Helmut-Körnig-Halle, Dortmund, Germany	(Germany) Katrin Seibert	(Thailand) Paramee Panyachaem (Denmark) Julie Thrane	21–13, 21–12	Gold
2013	Helmut-Körnig-Halle, Dortmund, Germany	(Germany) Katrin Seibert	(Thailand) Nipada Saensupa (Thailand) Chanida Srinavakul	21–12, 21–16	Gold
2013	Helmut-Körnig-Halle, Dortmund, Germany	(Germany) Katrin Seibert	(India) Parul Parmar (Thailand) Wandee Kantam	21–17, 21–13	Gold
2015	Stoke Mandeville Stadium, Stoke Mandeville, England	(Germany) Katrin Seibert	(France) Véronique Braud (France) Faustine Noël	21–11, 21–11	Gold
2015	Stoke Mandeville Stadium, Stoke Mandeville, England	(Germany) Katrin Seibert	(India) Siri Chandanna Chillari (India) Manasi Girishchandra Joshi	21–4, 21–4	Gold
2015	Stoke Mandeville Stadium, Stoke Mandeville, England	(Germany) Katrin Seibert	(Thailand) Wandee Kantam (Japan) Mamiko Toyoda	27–25, 21–13	Gold
2015	Stoke Mandeville Stadium, Stoke Mandeville, England	(Germany) Katrin Seibert	(India) Parul Parmar (Denmark) Julie Thrane	21–13, 21–16	Gold

=== European Para Championships ===
Women's singles

Year	Venue	Opponent	Score	Result
2023	Rotterdam Ahoy, Rotterdam, Netherlands	(France) Faustine Noël	21–6, 21–6	Gold

Mixed doubles

Year	Venue	Partner	Opponent	Score	Result
2023	Rotterdam Ahoy, Rotterdam, Netherlands	(Sweden) Rickard Nilsson	(France) Lucas Mazur (France) Faustine Noël	14–21, 14–21	Silver

=== European Championships ===
Women's singles

Year	Venue	Opponent	Score	Result
2014	High Performance Center, Murcia, Spain	(Turkey) Zehra Bağlar	21–11, 21–8	Gold
2014	High Performance Center, Murcia, Spain	(France) Thiéfaine Auvert	21–6, 21–6	Gold
2014	High Performance Center, Murcia, Spain	(Denmark) Julie Thrane	21–17, 21–13	Gold
2018	Amphitheatre Gymnasium, Rodez, France	(England) Emma Louise Stoner	21–9, 21–1	Gold
2018	Amphitheatre Gymnasium, Rodez, France	(France) Véronique Braud	21–11, 21–17	Gold
2018	Amphitheatre Gymnasium, Rodez, France	(Germany) Katrin Seibert	21–12, 21–17	Gold
2018	Amphitheatre Gymnasium, Rodez, France	(France) Faustine Noël	21–13, 22–20	Gold

Women's doubles

Year	Venue	Partner	Opponent	Score	Result
2018	Amphitheatre Gymnasium, Rodez, France	(Germany) Katrin Seibert	(France) Véronique Braud (England) Emma Louise Stoner	21–4, 21–8	Gold
2018	Amphitheatre Gymnasium, Rodez, France	(Germany) Katrin Seibert	(France) Catherine Naudin (Ukraine) Ivanna Redka	21–9, 21–3	Gold
2018	Amphitheatre Gymnasium, Rodez, France	(Germany) Katrin Seibert	(Turkey) Zehra Bağlar (Poland) Katarzyna Ziębik	21–17, 21–6	Gold
2018	Amphitheatre Gymnasium, Rodez, France	(Germany) Katrin Seibert	(France) Coraline Bergeron (Denmark) Cathrine Rosengren	21–11, 21–18	Gold

Mixed doubles

Year	Venue	Partner	Opponent	Score	Result
2014	High Performance Center, Murcia, Spain	(England) Bobby Griffin	(Turkey) Muammer Çankaya (Turkey) Zehra Bağlar	21–15, 21–11	Gold
2014	High Performance Center, Murcia, Spain	(England) Bobby Griffin	(France) Pascal Baron (France) Thiéfaine Auvert	21–2, 21–4	Gold
2014	High Performance Center, Murcia, Spain	(England) Bobby Griffin	(England) Daniel Bethell (Denmark) Julie Thrane	21–16, 23–21	Gold
2018	Amphitheatre Gymnasium, Rodez, France	(Germany) Jan-Niklas Pott	(France) Lucas Mazur (France) Faustine Noël	14–21, 11–21	Bronze

=== BWF Para Badminton World Circuit (7 titles, 1 runner-up) ===
The BWF Para Badminton World Circuit – Grade 2, Level 1, 2 and 3 tournaments has been sanctioned by the Badminton World Federation from 2022.

Women's singles

Year	Tournament	Level	Opponent	Score	Result
2022	Spanish Para Badminton International II	Level 2	(France) Milena Surreau	21–9, 21–11	(gold) Winner
2022	Canada Para Badminton International	Level 1	(Japan) Haruka Fujino	14–21, 21–11, 21–15	(gold) Winner
2022	4 Nations Para Badminton International	Level 1	(Japan) Haruka Fujino	Walkover	(gold) Winner
2022	4 Nations Para Badminton International	Level 1	(France) Faustine Noël	21–17, 21–12	(gold) Winner
2023	Spanish Para Badminton International	Level 1	(Japan) Haruka Fujino	21–12, 21–14	(gold) Winner
2023	4 Nations Para Badminton International	Level 1	(Japan) Haruka Fujino	21–16, 21–11	(gold) Winner
2024	Spanish Para Badminton International II	Level 2	(Japan) Haruka Fujino	21–17, 21–10	(gold) Winner
2024	Spanish Para Badminton International	Level 1	(Japan) Haruka Fujino	15–21, 21–15, 21–10	(gold) Winner
2024	4 Nations Para Badminton International	Level 1	(Indonesia) Leani Ratri Oktila	18–21, 12–21	(silver) Runner-up

=== International Tournaments (11 titles, 9 runners-up) ===
Women's singles

Year	Tournament	Opponent	Score	Result
2016	Turkish Para Badminton International	(Turkey) Zehra Bağlar	21–17, 21–12	(gold) Winner
2016	Irish Para Badminton International	(Germany) Katrin Seibert	21–13, 23–25, 14–21	(silver) Runner-up
2016	Irish Para Badminton International	(France) Véronique Braud	21–16, 21–7	(silver) Runner-up
2016	Irish Para Badminton International	(France) Faustine Noël	21–18, 21–17	(silver) Runner-up
2017	Spanish Para Badminton International	(France) Faustine Noël	21–16, 21–17	(gold) Winner
2018	Spanish Para Badminton International	(Germany) Katrin Seibert	21–10, 14–21, 21–16	(gold) Winner
2018	Irish Para Badminton International	(Indonesia) Leani Ratri Oktila	8–21, 10–21	(silver) Runner-up
2019	Uganda Para Badminton International	(Scotland) Mary Margaret Wilson	21–17, 21–8	(gold) Winner
2019	Irish Para Badminton International	(Indonesia) Leani Ratri Oktila	21–14, 12–21, 11–21	(silver) Runner-up
2019	Denmark Para Badminton International	(Thailand) Chanida Srinavakul	21–19, 21–18	(gold) Winner
2019	Denmark Para Badminton International	(Scotland) Mary Margaret Wilson	21–9, 21–10	(gold) Winner
2019	Denmark Para Badminton International	(Germany) Katrin Seibert	15–21, 21–12, 21–16	(gold) Winner
2019	Denmark Para Badminton International	(Japan) Haruka Fujino	21–11, 13–21, 23–21	(gold) Winner
2020	Peru Para Badminton International	(Japan) Haruka Fujino	20–22, 21–16, 14–21	(silver) Runner-up
2021	Dubai Para Badminton International	(United Arab Emirates) Salama Al Khateri	21–2, 21–0	(silver) Runner-up
2021	Dubai Para Badminton International	(France) Faustine Noël	21–14, 19–21, 21–16	(silver) Runner-up
2021	Dubai Para Badminton International	(Indonesia) Leani Ratri Oktila	11–21, 17–21	(silver) Runner-up
2021	Dubai Para Badminton International	(Netherlands) Sophie van den Broek	21–6, 21–6	(silver) Runner-up
2021	Spanish Para Badminton International	(Japan) Haruka Fujino	21–8, 21–7	(gold) Winner

Women's doubles

Year	Tournament	Partner	Opponent	Score	Result
2016	Irish Para Badminton International	(Germany) Katrin Seibert	(Japan) Mamiko Toyoda (Japan) Asami Yamada	21–19, 21–9	(gold) Winner
2017	Spanish Para Badminton International	(Germany) Katrin Seibert	(France) Véronique Braud (France) Faustine Noël	21–18, 21–16	(gold) Winner
2017	Japan Para Badminton International	(Germany) Katrin Seibert	(India) Manasi Girishchandra Joshi (China) Yang Qiuxia	21–23, 15–21	(silver) Runner-up
2018	Spanish Para Badminton International	(Germany) Katrin Seibert	(India) Manasi Girishchandra Joshi (Japan) Mamiko Toyoda	21–19, 21–12	(gold) Winner
2018	Irish Para Badminton International	(Germany) Katrin Seibert	(Australia) Caitlin Dransfield (Australia) Celine Aurelie Vinot	21–9, 21–10	(silver) Runner-up
2018	Irish Para Badminton International	(Germany) Katrin Seibert	(France) Véronique Braud (Scotland) Mary Margaret Wilson	21–6, 21–15	(silver) Runner-up
2018	Irish Para Badminton International	(Germany) Katrin Seibert	(Russia) Ekaterina Oginskaya (Russia) Vita Vimba	21–7, 21–2	(silver) Runner-up
2018	Irish Para Badminton International	(Germany) Katrin Seibert	(Indonesia) Leani Ratri Oktila (Indonesia) Khalimatus Sadiyah	16–21, 9–21	(silver) Runner-up

Mixed doubles

Year	Tournament	Partner	Opponent	Score	Result
2016	Turkish Para Badminton International	(England) Bobby Griffin	(France) Lucas Mazur (France) Faustine Noël	8–21, 10–21	(silver) Runner-up
2016	Irish Para Badminton International	(Germany) Jan-Niklas Pott	(France) Lucas Mazur (France) Faustine Noël	17–21, 8–21	(silver) Runner-up
2017	Spanish Para Badminton International	(Germany) Jan-Niklas Pott	(Germany) Marcel Adam (Germany) Katrin Seibert	21–17, 16–21, 21–19	(gold) Winner
2018	Denmark Para Badminton International	(Germany) Jan-Niklas Pott	(Scotland) Colin Leslie (Denmark) Cathrine Rosengren	26–24, 21–11	(gold) Winner
2018	Denmark Para Badminton International	(Germany) Jan-Niklas Pott	(Ukraine) Oleksandr Chyrkov (Ukraine) Ivanna Redka	21–8, 21–7	(gold) Winner
2018	Denmark Para Badminton International	(Germany) Jan-Niklas Pott	(Brazil) Rogerio Junior Xavier (Scotland) Mary Margaret Wilson	21–18, 21–8	(gold) Winner
