= Badminton at the 2024 Summer Paralympics – Women's singles SL4 =

Badminton competition

Women's singles SL4 at the XVII Paralympic Games
- Venue: Arena Porte de La Chapelle, Paris
- Dates: 29 August 2024 – 2 September 2024
- Competitors: 9 from 7 nations

Medalists
1st place, gold medalist(s)		Cheng Hefang	China
2nd place, silver medalist(s)		Leani Ratri Oktila	Indonesia
3rd place, bronze medalist(s)		Helle Sofie Sagøy	Norway

The women's singles SL4 tournament at the 2024 Summer Paralympics in France will take place between 29 August and 2 September 2024 at Arena Porte de La Chapelle.

== Classification ==
- SL4
  Players have impairment in one or both lower limbs and minimal impairment in walking/running balance (better walking/running compared to SL3)

== Seeds ==
These were the seeds for this event:

1. Helle Sofie Sagøy (NOR) (semifinals, bronze medalist)
2. Leani Ratri Oktila (INA) (final, silver medalist)
3. Cheng Hefang (CHN) (champion, gold medalist)

== Group stage ==
The draw of the group stage revealed on 24 August 2024. The group stage will be played from 29 to 31 August. The top two winners of each group advanced to the knockout rounds.

=== Group A ===
Pos	Team	Pld	W	L	GF	GA	GD	PF	PA	PD	Pts	Qualification
1	Helle Sofie Sagøy (NOR)	2	2	0	4	0	+4	84	39	+45	2	Semi-finals
2	Haruka Fujino (JPN)	2	1	1	2	2	0	70	66	+4	1	Quarter-finals
3	Nipada Seansupa (THA)	2	0	2	0	4	−4	35	84	−49	0	

First match(es) will be played: 29 August 2024. Source: COJOP2024

Date	Time	Player 1	Score	Player 2	Set 1	Set 2	Set 3	Report
Aug 29	13:50	Helle Sofie Sagøy (Norway)	2–0	(Thailand) Nipada Seansupa	21–8	21–3		
Aug 30	12:30	Haruka Fujino (Japan)	2–0	(Thailand) Nipada Seansupa	21–13	21–11		
Aug 31		Helle Sofie Sagøy (Norway)	2–0	(Japan) Haruka Fujino	21–14	21–14		

=== Group B ===
Pos	Team	Pld	W	L	GF	GA	GD	PF	PA	PD	Pts	Qualification
1	Cheng Hefang (CHN)	2	2	0	4	0	+4	84	50	+34	2	Quarter-finals
2	Khalimatus Sadiyah (INA)	2	1	1	2	2	0	69	63	+6	1	Quarter-finals
3	Faustine Noël (FRA) (H)	2	0	2	0	4	−4	44	84	−40	0	

First match(es) will be played: 29 August 2024. Source: COJOP2024
(H) Host

Date	Time	Player 1	Score	Player 2	Set 1	Set 2	Set 3	Report
Aug 29	13:10	Cheng Hefang (China)	2–0	(Indonesia) Khalimatus Sadiyah	21–12	21–15		
Aug 30	13:10	Cheng Hefang (China)	2–0	(France) Faustine Noël	21–12	21–11		
Aug 31	12:30	Khalimatus Sadiyah (Indonesia)	2–0	(France) Faustine Noël	21–9	21–12		

=== Group C ===
Pos	Team	Pld	W	L	GF	GA	GD	PF	PA	PD	Pts	Qualification
1	Leani Ratri Oktila (INA)	2	2	0	4	1	+3	102	58	+44	2	Semi-finals
2	Palak Kohli (IND)	2	1	1	3	2	+1	81	86	−5	1	Quarter-finals
3	Milena Surreau (FRA) (H)	2	0	2	0	4	−4	45	84	−39	0	

First match(es) will be played: 29 August 2024. Source: COJOP2024
(H) Host

Date	Time	Player 1	Score	Player 2	Set 1	Set 2	Set 3	Report
Aug 29	13:10	Milena Surreau (France)	0–2	(India) Palak Kohli	12–21	14–21		
Aug 30	13:10	Leani Ratri Oktila (Indonesia)	2–1	(India) Palak Kohli	18–21	21–5	21–13	
Aug 31	13:10	Leani Ratri Oktila (Indonesia)	2–0	(France) Milena Surreau	21–9	21–10		

== Finals ==
The knockout stage will be played from 1 to 2 September.

Quarter-finals
B1	Cheng Hefang (CHN)	21	21
A2	Haruka Fujino (JPN)	9	13
C2	Palak Kohli (IND)	19	15
B2	Khalimatus Sadiyah (INA)	21	21

Semi-finals
A1	Helle Sofie Sagøy (NOR)	14	9
B1	Cheng Hefang (CHN)	21	21
B2	Khalimatus Sadiyah (INA)	14	12
C1	Leani Ratri Oktila (INA)	21	21

Gold medal match
B1	Cheng Hefang (CHN) (gold)	21	21
C1	Leani Ratri Oktila (INA) (silver)	14	18
Bronze medal match
A1	Helle Sofie Sagøy (NOR) (bronze)	21	21
B2	Khalimatus Sadiyah (INA)	10	14
