= Badminton at the 2020 Summer Paralympics – Women's singles WH1 =

Women's singles WH1 at the XVI Paralympic Games
- Venue: Yoyogi National Gymnasium
- Dates: 1–4 September 2021
- Competitors: 10 from 7 nations

Medalists
1st place, gold medalist(s)		Sarina Satomi	Japan
2nd place, silver medalist(s)		Sujirat Pookkham	Thailand
3rd place, bronze medalist(s)		Yin Menglu	China

The women's singles WH1 tournament at the 2020 Summer Paralympics in Tokyo took place between 1 and 4 September 2021 at Yoyogi National Gymnasium.

== Seeds ==
These were the seeds for this event:

1. Sarina Satomi (JPN) (gold medalist)
2. Sujirat Pookkham (THA) (silver medalist)
3. Valeska Knoblauch (GER) (quarter-finals)

== Group stage ==
The draw of the group stage revealed on 26 August 2021. The group stage was played from 1 to 2 September. The top two winners of each group advanced to the knockout rounds.

=== Group A ===
Pos	Team	Pld	W	L	GF	GA	GD	PF	PA	PD	Pts	Qualification
1	Yin Menglu (CHN)	2	2	0	4	0	+4	87	63	+24	2	Advance to semi-finals
2	Sarina Satomi (JPN) (H)	2	1	1	2	2	0	75	64	+11	1	Advance to quarter-finals
3	Kang Jung-kum (KOR)	2	0	2	0	4	−4	49	84	−35	0	

Source: TOCOG
(H) Host

Date	Time	Player 1	Score	Player 2	Set 1	Set 2	Set 3
1 Sep	18:40	Sarina Satomi (Japan)	2–0	(South Korea) Kang Jung-kum	21–12	21–7	
2 Sep	11:40	Yin Menglu (China)	2–0	(South Korea) Kang Jung-kum	21–16	21–14	
2 Sep	18:40	Sarina Satomi (Japan)	0–2	(China) Yin Menglu	11–21	22–24	

=== Group B ===
Pos	Team	Pld	W	L	GF	GA	GD	PF	PA	PD	Pts	Qualification
1	Karin Suter-Erath (SUI)	2	2	0	4	0	+4	84	46	+38	2	Advance to quarter-finals
2	Valeska Knoblauch (GER)	2	1	1	2	2	0	75	57	+18	1	Advance to quarter-finals
3	Elke Rongen (GER)	2	0	2	0	4	−4	28	84	−56	0	

Source: TOCOG

Date	Time	Player 1	Score	Player 2	Set 1	Set 2	Set 3
1 Sep	18:00	Valeska Knoblauch (Germany)	2–0	(Germany) Elke Rongen	21–7	21–8	
2 Sep	11:40	Karin Suter-Erath (Switzerland)	2–0	(Germany) Elke Rongen	21–6	21–7	
2 Sep	19:20	Valeska Knoblauch (Germany)	0–2	(Switzerland) Karin Suter-Erath	18–21	15–21	

=== Group C ===
Pos	Team	Pld	W	L	GF	GA	GD	PF	PA	PD	Pts	Qualification
1	Sujirat Pookkham (THA)	3	3	0	6	0	+6	126	63	+63	3	Advance to semi-finals
2	Zhang Jing (CHN)	3	2	1	4	3	+1	131	122	+9	2	Advance to quarter-finals
3	Cynthia Mathez (SUI)	3	1	2	3	4	−1	126	133	−7	1	
4	Nina Gorodetzky (ISR)	3	0	3	0	6	−6	61	126	−65	0	

Source: TOCOG

Date	Time	Player 1	Score	Player 2	Set 1	Set 2	Set 3
1 Sep	18:00	Zhang Jing (China)	2–0	(Israel) Nina Gorodetzky	21–11	21–12	
1 Sep	18:40	Sujirat Pookkham (Thailand)	2–0	(Switzerland) Cynthia Mathez	21–12	21–15	
2 Sep	11:00	Zhang Jing (China)	2–1	(Switzerland) Cynthia Mathez	20–22	25–23	21–12
2 Sep	11:40	Sujirat Pookkham (Thailand)	2–0	(Israel) Nina Gorodetzky	21–4	21–9	
2 Sep	19:20	Nina Gorodetzky (Israel)	0–2	(Switzerland) Cynthia Mathez	15–21	10–21	
2 Sep	20:00	Sujirat Pookkham (Thailand)	2–0	(China) Zhang Jing	21–4	21–19	

== Finals ==
The knockout stage was played from 3 to 4 September.

Quarter-finals
B1	Karin Suter-Erath (SUI)	8	9
A2	Sarina Satomi (JPN)	21	21
C2	Zhang Jing (CHN)	21	21
B2	Valeska Knoblauch (GER)	16	18

Semi-finals
A1	Yin Menglu (CHN)	18	18
A2	Sarina Satomi (JPN)	21	21
C2	Zhang Jing (CHN)	11	7
C1	Sujirat Pookkham (THA)	21	21

Gold medal match
A2	Sarina Satomi (JPN) (gold)	14	21	21
C1	Sujirat Pookkham (THA) (silver)	21	19	13
Bronze medal match
A1	Yin Menglu (CHN) (bronze)	21	21
C2	Zhang Jing (CHN)	10	18
