= Katrin Seibert =

German para badminton player

Personal information
- Born: 19 June 1970 (age 56) Dortmund, Germany
- Height: 170 cm (5 ft 7 in)

Sport
- Country: Germany
- Sport: Badminton

Women's singles SL4 Women's doubles SL3–SU5 Mixed doubles SL3–SU5
- Highest ranking: 6 (WS 1 January 2019); 2 (WD with Helle Sofie Sagøy 1 January 2019); 3 (XD with Jan-Niklas Pott 20 July 2022)
- Current ranking: 23 (WS); 11 (WD with Helle Sofie Sagøy); 8 (XD with Jan-Niklas Pott) (8 November 2022)
Medal record
Para badminton
Representing Germany
World Championships
Gold medal – first place	2013 Dortmund	Women's doubles
Gold medal – first place	2013 Dortmund	Mixed doubles
Gold medal – first place	2015 Stoke Mandeville	Women's doubles
Silver medal – second place	2019 Basel	Mixed doubles
Bronze medal – third place	2013 Dortmund	Women's singles
Bronze medal – third place	2015 Stoke Mandeville	Women's singles
Bronze medal – third place	2015 Stoke Mandeville	Mixed doubles
Bronze medal – third place	2017 Ulsan	Mixed doubles
European Championships
Gold medal – first place	2008 Dortmund	Women's singles
Gold medal – first place	2010 Filzbach	Women's singles
Gold medal – first place	2010 Filzbach	Women's doubles
Gold medal – first place	2016 Beek	Women's singles
Gold medal – first place	2018 Rodez	Women's doubles
Silver medal – second place	2008 Dortmund	Women's doubles
Silver medal – second place	2012 Dortmund	Doubles
Silver medal – second place	2018 Rodez	Mixed doubles
Bronze medal – third place	2016 Beek	Mixed doubles
Bronze medal – third place	2018 Rodez	Women's singles

Katrin Seibert (born 19 June 1970) is a German para badminton player who competes in international level events. She has won numerous doubles titles with Helle Sofie Sagøy in the women's events and Peter Schnitzler and Jak-Niklas Pott in the mixed doubles events.

Seibert is a sarcoma survivor and lymphedema which restricts movement in her legs.

== Achievements ==
=== World Championships ===
Women's singles

Year	Venue	Opponent	Score	Result
2013	Helmut-Körnig-Halle, Dortmund, Germany	(Norway) Helle Sofie Sagøy	21–10, 20–22, 21–23	Bronze
2015	Stoke Mandeville Stadium, Stoke Mandeville, England	(Norway) Helle Sofie Sagøy	17–21, 13–21	Bronze

Women's doubles

Year	Venue	Partner	Opponent	Score	Result
2013 (Note: This tournament uses a round robin system.)	Helmut-Körnig-Halle, Dortmund, Germany	(Norway) Helle Sofie Sagøy	(Thailand) Paramee Panyachaem (Denmark) Julie Thrane	21–13, 21–12	Gold
2013	Helmut-Körnig-Halle, Dortmund, Germany	(Norway) Helle Sofie Sagøy	(Thailand) Nipada Saensupa (Thailand) Chanida Srinavakul	21–12, 21–16	Gold
2013	Helmut-Körnig-Halle, Dortmund, Germany	(Norway) Helle Sofie Sagøy	(India) Parul Parmar (Thailand) Wandee Kantam	21–17, 21–13	Gold
2015 (Note: This tournament uses a round robin system.)	Stoke Mandeville Stadium, Stoke Mandeville, England	(Norway) Helle Sofie Sagøy	(France) Véronique Braud (France) Faustine Noël	21–11, 21–11	Gold
2015	Stoke Mandeville Stadium, Stoke Mandeville, England	(Norway) Helle Sofie Sagøy	(India) Siri Chandanna Chillari (India) Manasi Girishchandra Joshi	21–4, 21–4	Gold
2015	Stoke Mandeville Stadium, Stoke Mandeville, England	(Norway) Helle Sofie Sagøy	(Thailand) Wandee Kantam (Japan) Mamiko Toyoda	27–25, 21–13	Gold
2015	Stoke Mandeville Stadium, Stoke Mandeville, England	(Norway) Helle Sofie Sagøy	(India) Parul Parmar (Denmark) Julie Thrane	21–13, 21–16	Gold

Mixed doubles

Year	Venue	Partner	Opponent	Score	Result
2013	Helmut-Körnig-Halle, Dortmund, Germany	(Germany) Peter Schnitzler	(Thailand) Dachathon Saengarayakul (Thailand) Saensupa Nipada	21–15, 21–16	Gold
2015	Stoke Mandeville Stadium, Stoke Mandeville, England	(Germany) Peter Schnitzler	(India) Raj Kumar (India) Parul Parmar	18–21, 15–21	Bronze
2017	Dongchun Gymnasium, Ulsan, South Korea	(Germany) Marcel Adam	(Indonesia) Hary Susanto (Indonesia) Leani Ratri Oktila	8–21, 12–21	Bronze
2019	St. Jakobshalle, Basel, Switzerland	(Germany) Jann-Niklas Pott	(Indonesia) Hary Susanto (Indonesia) Leani Ratri Oktila	4–21, 11–21	Silver

=== European Championships ===
Women's singles

Year	Venue	Opponent	Score	Result
2008	Sporthallen TSC Eintracht Dortmund, Dortmund, Germany			Gold
2010	Sportzentrum Kerenzerberg, Filzbach, Switzerland			Gold
2016 (Note: This tournament uses a round robin system.)	Sporthal de Haamen, Beek, Netherlands	(Poland) Katarzyna Ziębik	21–3, 21–5	Gold
2016	Sporthal de Haamen, Beek, Netherlands	(France) Véronique Braud	21–16, 21–6	Gold
2016	Sporthal de Haamen, Beek, Netherlands	(Russia) Natalia Iaremchuk	21–6, 21–5	Gold
2016	Sporthal de Haamen, Beek, Netherlands	(France) Faustine Noël	21–16, 21–17	Gold
2018 (Note: This tournament uses a round robin system.)	Amphitheatre Gymnasium, Rodez, France	(England) Emma Louise Stoner	21–8, 21–15	Bronze
2018	Amphitheatre Gymnasium, Rodez, France	(France) Véronique Braud	21–15, 15–21, 21–10	Bronze
2018	Amphitheatre Gymnasium, Rodez, France	(France) Faustine Noël	17–21, 21–18, 13–21	Bronze
2018	Amphitheatre Gymnasium, Rodez, France	(Norway) Helle Sofie Sagøy	12–21, 17–21	Bronze

Women's doubles

Year	Venue	Partner	Opponent	Score	Result
2008	Sporthallen TSC Eintracht Dortmund, Dortmund, Germany				Silver
2010	Sportzentrum Kerenzerberg, Filzbach, Switzerland				Gold
2018 (Note: This tournament uses a round robin system.)	Amphitheatre Gymnasium, Rodez, France	(Norway) Helle Sofie Sagøy	(France) Véronique Braud (England) Emma Louise Stoner	21–4, 21–8	Gold
2018	Amphitheatre Gymnasium, Rodez, France	(Norway) Helle Sofie Sagøy	(France) Catherine Naudin (Ukraine) Ivanna Redka	21–9, 21–3	Gold
2018	Amphitheatre Gymnasium, Rodez, France	(Norway) Helle Sofie Sagøy	(Turkey) Zehra Bağlar (Poland) Katarzyna Ziębik	21–17, 21–6	Gold
2018	Amphitheatre Gymnasium, Rodez, France	(Norway) Helle Sofie Sagøy	(France) Coraline Bergeron (Denmark) Cathrine Rosengren	21–11, 21–18	Gold

Doubles

Year	Venue	Partner	Opponent	Score	Result
2012	Helmut-Körnig-Halle, Dortmund, Germany	(Germany) Peter Schnitzler	(England) Antony Forster (Germany) Jan-Niklas Pott	16–21, 16–21	Silver

Mixed doubles

Year	Venue	Partner	Opponent	Score	Result
2016	Sporthal de Haamen, Beek, Netherlands	(Germany) Peter Schnitzler	(France) Geoffrey Byzery (Denmark) Cathrine Rosengren	15–21, 21–23	Bronze
2018	Amphitheatre Gymnasium, Rodez, France	(Germany) Marcel Adam	(France) Lucas Mazur (France) Faustine Noël	19–21, 10–21	Silver
