= Badminton at the 2023 European Para Championships – Women's singles SL4 =

Badminton's women's singles SL4 at the 2023 European Para Championships
- Venue: Rotterdam Ahoy, Rotterdam
- Dates: 15 – 20 August
- Competitors: 9 from 7 nations

Medalists
gold medal	Helle Sofie Sagøy	Norway
silver medal	Faustine Noël	France
bronze medal	Tuğçe Çelik	Turkey
bronze medal	Milena Surreau	France

The women's singles SL4 badminton tournament at the 2023 European Para Championships was played from 15 to 20 August 2023 in Rotterdam Ahoy, Rotterdam. A total of 9 players competed at the tournament, three of whom was seeded.

== Competition schedule ==
Play took place between 15 and 20 August.

GS	Group stage	¼	Quarterfinals	½	Semifinals	F	Final

Events	Tue 15	Wed 16	Thu 17	Fri 18	Sat 19	Sun 20
Women's singles SL4	GS	GS	GS	¼	½	F

== Seeds ==
The following players were seeded:

1. Helle Sofie Sagøy (NOR) (champion; gold medalist)
2. Faustine Noël (FRA) (final; silver medalist)
3. Lénaïg Morin (FRA) (quarter-finals)

== Group stage ==
=== Group A ===
Pos	Team	Pld	W	L	GF	GA	GD	PF	PA	PD	Qualification
1	Helle Sofie Sagøy (NOR) [1]	2	2	0	4	0	+4	84	24	+60	Qualification to elimination stage
2	Milena Surreau (FRA)	2	1	1	2	2	0	62	56	+6	Qualification to elimination stage
3	Inoi Ferreira (POR)	2	0	2	0	4	−4	18	84	−66	

Source: Group A – standings

Date		Score		Game 1	Game 2	Game 3
15 August	Helle Sofie Sagøy (Norway)	2–0	(Portugal) Inoi Ferreira	21–2	21–2	
16 August	Helle Sofie Sagøy (Norway)	2–0	(France) Milena Surreau	21–15	21–5	
17 August	Inoi Ferreira (Portugal)	0–2	(France) Milena Surreau	6–21	8–21	

=== Group B ===
Pos	Team	Pld	W	L	GF	GA	GD	PF	PA	PD	Qualification
1	Faustine Noël (FRA) [2]	2	2	0	4	0	+4	84	47	+37	Qualification to elimination stage
2	Tuğçe Çelik (TUR)	2	1	1	2	2	0	77	53	+24	Qualification to elimination stage
3	Venla Salo (FIN)	2	0	2	0	4	−4	23	84	−61	

Source: Group B – standings

Date		Score		Game 1	Game 2	Game 3
15 August	Faustine Noël (France)	2–0	(Finland) Venla Salo	21–4	21–8	
16 August	Faustine Noël (France)	2–0	(Turkey) Tuğçe Çelik	21–19	21–16	
17 August	Venla Salo (Finland)	0–2	(Turkey) Tuğçe Çelik	7–21	4–21	

=== Group C ===
Pos	Team	Pld	W	L	GF	GA	GD	PF	PA	PD	Qualification
1	Lénaïg Morin (FRA) [3]	2	2	0	4	0	+4	84	56	+28	Qualification to elimination stage
2	Emma Stoner (GBR)	2	1	1	2	3	−1	88	86	+2	Qualification to elimination stage
3	Sophie van der Broek (NED) (H)	2	0	2	1	4	−3	72	102	−30	

Source: Group C – standings
(H) Host

Date		Score		Game 1	Game 2	Game 3
15 August	Lénaïg Morin (France)	2–0	(United Kingdom) Emma Stoner	21–11	21–17	
16 August	Lénaïg Morin (France)	2–0	(Netherlands) Sophie van der Broek	21–12	21–16	
17 August	Emma Stoner (United Kingdom)	2–1	(Netherlands) Sophie van der Broek	21–11	18–21	21–12

== Elimination stage ==
Quarter-finals
Tuğçe Çelik (TUR)	21	21
Emma Stoner (GBR)	9	11
Milena Surreau (FRA)	26	22
3	Lénaïg Morin (FRA)	24	20

Semi-finals
1	Helle Sofie Sagøy (NOR)	21	21
Tuğçe Çelik (TUR)	5	8
Milena Surreau (FRA)	19	15
2	Faustine Noël (FRA)	21	21

Final
1	Helle Sofie Sagøy (NOR)	21	21
2	Faustine Noël (FRA)	6	6
