= Martin Rooke =

English para-badminton player

Personal information
- Born: 21 November 1972 (age 53) Hertfordshire, England, United Kingdom
- Height: 1.80 m (5 ft 11 in)

Sport
- Country: England
- Sport: Badminton
- Handedness: Right

Men's singles WH2 Men's doubles WH1–WH2 Mixed doubles WH1–WH2
- Highest ranking: 3 (MS 25 June 2019); 1 (MD with Thomas Wandschneider 1 January 2019)
Medal record
Men's para-badminton
Representing England
World Championships
Silver medal – second place	2013 Dortmund	Men's doubles
European Championships
Gold medal – first place	2012 Dortmund	Men's singles
Gold medal – first place	2012 Dortmund	Men's doubles
Gold medal – first place	2014 Murcia	Men's singles
Gold medal – first place	2014 Murcia	Mixed doubles
Gold medal – first place	2016 Beek	Mixed doubles
Gold medal – first place	2018 Rodez	Men's singles
Gold medal – first place	2018 Rodez	Men's doubles
Silver medal – second place	2014 Murcia	Men's doubles
Silver medal – second place	2016 Beek	Men's doubles
Bronze medal – third place	2016 Beek	Men's singles

Martin Rooke (born 21 November 1972) is an English former para-badminton player. He represented Great Britain in the men's singles WH2 event in para-badminton at the 2020 Summer Paralympics and was eliminated in the quarter-finals.

Rooke announced his retirement from international para-badminton after the 2020 Summer Paralympics.

== Biography ==
Before his accident, Rooke competed in semi-professional football and played for Tring Athletic F.C. in his hometown of Hertfordshire. Rooke also competed in gymnastics. In May 2006, he suffered an incomplete paraplegia in a house collapse and has been dependent on a wheelchair ever since.

Rooke started to compete in para-badminton in 2010. Two years later, he won gold in singles and doubles at the European Para-Badminton Championships.

== Achievements ==
=== World Championships ===
Men's doubles WH1–WH2
Year	Venue	Partner	Opponent	Score	Result
2013	Helmut-Körnig-Halle, Dortmund, Germany	(England) Gobi Ranganathan	(South Korea) Kim Jung-jun (South Korea) Kim Kyung-hoon	14–21, 19–21	Silver

=== European Championships ===
Men's singles WH2
Year	Venue	Opponent	Score	Result
2012	Helmut-Körnig-Halle, Dortmund, Germany	(England) Gobi Ranganathan	21–15, 16–21, 21–17	Gold
2014	High Performance Center, Murcia, Spain	(France) François Nalborczyk	21–9, 21–6	Gold
2016	Sporthal de Haamen, Beek, Netherlands	(Netherlands) Jordy Brouwer	21–9, 21–5	Bronze
2018	Amphitheatre Gymnasium, Rodez, France	(Israel) Amir Levi	21–18, 13–21, 21–17	Gold

Men's doubles WH1–WH2

Year	Venue	Partner	Opponent	Score	Result
2012 (Note: This tournament uses a round robin system.)	Helmut-Körnig-Halle, Dortmund, Germany	(England) Gobi Ranganathan	(Spain) Javier Fernández (Spain) José Guillermo Lama	21–8, 21–17	Gold
2012	Helmut-Körnig-Halle, Dortmund, Germany	(England) Gobi Ranganathan	(Germany) David Holz (Germany) Manfred Steinhart	21–18, 21–16	Gold
2012	Helmut-Körnig-Halle, Dortmund, Germany	(England) Gobi Ranganathan	(Netherlands) Jordy Brouwer (France) François Nalborczyk	21–8, 21–10	Gold
2014	High Performance Center, Murcia, Spain	(Turkey) Avni Kertmen	(France) David Toupé (Germany) Thomas Wandschneider	11–21, 13–21	Silver
2016	Sporthal de Haamen, Beek, Netherlands	(France) David Toupé	(England) Connor Dua-Harper (Germany) Thomas Wandschneider	17–21, 21–12, 16–21	Silver
2018	Amphitheatre Gymnasium, Rodez, France	(Germany) Thomas Wandschneider	(France) David Toupé (Israel) Amir Levi	21–19, 21–16	Gold

Mixed doubles WH1–WH2
Year	Venue	Partner	Opponent	Score	Result
2014	High Performance Center; Murcia, Spain	(Switzerland) Karin Suter-Erath	(France) David Toupé (Switzerland) Sonja Häsler	21–15, 21–8	Gold
2016	Sporthal de Haamen; Beek, Netherlands	(Switzerland) Karin Suter-Erath	(France) David Toupé (Turkey) Narin Uluç	21–18, 21–14	Gold

=== International tournaments (2011–2021) (4 titles, 4 runners-up) ===
Men's singles WH2

Year	Tournament	Opponent	Score	Result
2012	French Para-Badminton International	(England) Gobi Ranganathan	21–15, 21–19	(gold) Winner
2016	Turkish Para-Badminton International	(Switzerland) Christian Hamböck	21–5, 21–7	(silver) Runner-up
2016	Turkish Para-Badminton International	(Finland) Harri Isomaeki	21–11, 21–7	(silver) Runner-up
2016	Turkish Para-Badminton International	(Malaysia) Madzlan Saibon	16–21, 15–21	(silver) Runner-up
2018	Japan Para-Badminton International	(South Korea) Kim Sun-cheol	18–21, 22–24	(silver) Runner-up

Men's doubles WH1–WH2
Year	Tournament	Partner	Opponent	Score	Result
2015	Spanish Para-Badminton International	(England) Connor Dua-Harper	(France) David Toupé (Germany) Thomas Wandschneider	20–22, 12–21	(silver) Runner-up
2018	Irish Para-Badminton International	(Germany) Thomas Wandschneider	(South Korea) Kim Kyung-hoon (South Korea) Lee Sam-seop	17–21, 13–21	(silver) Runner-up

Mixed doubles WH1–WH2
Year	Tournament	Partner	Opponent	Score	Result
2014	England Para-Badminton Championships	(Switzerland) Karin Suter-Erath	(Thailand) Jakarin Homhual (Thailand) Sujirat Pookkham	21–14, 21–14	(gold) Winner
2015	Spanish Para-Badminton International	(Switzerland) Karin Suter-Erath	(Germany) Young-chin Mi (Germany) Valeska Knoblauch	21–12, 21–12	(gold) Winner
2016	Turkish Para-Badminton International	(Switzerland) Karin Suter-Erath	(France) David Toupé (Switzerland) Sonja Häsler	22–20, 21–11	(gold) Winner
