= 2013 BWF Para-Badminton World Championships =

- Venue: Helmut-Körnig-Halle
- Location: Dortmund, Germany
- Start date: 5 November 2013
- End date: 10 November 2013
- Competitors: 255

The 2013 BWF Para-Badminton World Championships were held from 5 to 10 November 2013 in Dortmund, Germany.

== Medalists ==
23 events were contested at the championships.

=== Men's events ===
Event	Gold	Silver	Bronze
Singles WH1	Lee Sam-seop; South Korea	Homhual Jakarin; Thailand	Thomas Wandschneider; Germany
Singles WH1	Lee Sam-seop; South Korea	Homhual Jakarin; Thailand	Osamu Nagashima; Japan
Singles WH2	Kim Jung-jun; South Korea	Kim Kyung-hoon; South Korea	Chan Ho Yuen; Hong Kong
Singles WH2	Kim Jung-jun; South Korea	Kim Kyung-hoon; South Korea	Ngoc Binh Truong; Vietnam
Singles SL3	Duc Trung Pham; Vietnam	Kim Chang-man; South Korea	Pascal Wolter; Germany
Singles SL3	Duc Trung Pham; Vietnam	Kim Chang-man; South Korea	Toshiaki Suenaga; Japan
Singles SL4	Tarun Dhillon; India	Lin Cheng Che; Chinese Taipei	Ashutosh Dubey; India
Singles SL4	Tarun Dhillon; India	Lin Cheng Che; Chinese Taipei	Bakri Omar; Malaysia
Singles SU5	Cheah Liek Hou; Malaysia	Bartłomiej Mróz; Poland	Tay Wei Ming; Singapore
Singles SU5	Cheah Liek Hou; Malaysia	Bartłomiej Mróz; Poland	Raj Kumar; India
Singles SS6	Niall McVeigh; Ireland	Andrew Martin; England	Oliver Clarke; England
Singles SS6	Niall McVeigh; Ireland	Andrew Martin; England	Alexander Mekhdiev; Russia
Doubles WH1	(France) David Toupé (Germany) Thomas Wandschneider	(Turkey) Avni Kertmen (South Korea) Lee Sam-seop	(Japan) Osamu Nagashima (Japan) Seiji Yamami
Doubles WH1	(France) David Toupé (Germany) Thomas Wandschneider	(Turkey) Avni Kertmen (South Korea) Lee Sam-seop	(Russia) Pavel Popov (Russia) Yuri Stepanov
Doubles WH2	(South Korea) Kim Jung-jun (South Korea) Kim Kyung-hoon	(England) Gobi Ranganathan (England) Martin Rooke	(Hong Kong) Chan Ho Yuen (India) Sanjeev Kumar
Doubles WH2	(South Korea) Kim Jung-jun (South Korea) Kim Kyung-hoon	(England) Gobi Ranganathan (England) Martin Rooke	(Thailand) Junthong Dumnern (Vietnam) Ngoc Binh Truong
Doubles SL3	(India) Pramod Bhagat (India) Manoj Sarkar	(Japan) Taku Hiroi (Japan) Toshiaki Suenaga	(India) Siddana Sahukar (India) Prakash Stephen
Doubles SL3	(India) Pramod Bhagat (India) Manoj Sarkar	(Japan) Taku Hiroi (Japan) Toshiaki Suenaga	(Vietnam) Pham Thang Hoang (Vietnam) Duc Trung Pham
Doubles SL4	(Thailand) Chawart Kitichokwattana (Thailand) Dachathon Saengarayakul	(Malaysia) Chee Wai Chong (Malaysia) Bakri Omar	(Chinese Taipei) Lin Cheng Che (Chinese Taipei) Lin Yung-Chang
Doubles SL4	(Thailand) Chawart Kitichokwattana (Thailand) Dachathon Saengarayakul	(Malaysia) Chee Wai Chong (Malaysia) Bakri Omar	(England) Antony Forster (Germany) Jan-Niklas Pott
Doubles SU5	(Malaysia) Cheah Liek Hou (Malaysia) Suhalli Laiman	(Poland) Bartłomiej Mróz (Turkey) Ilker Tuzcu	(Japan) Gen Shogaki (Japan) Tetsuo Ura
Doubles SU5	(Malaysia) Cheah Liek Hou (Malaysia) Suhalli Laiman	(Poland) Bartłomiej Mróz (Turkey) Ilker Tuzcu	(Singapore) Wai Hwa Kelvin Pung (Singapore) Tay Wei Ming

=== Women's events ===
Event	Gold	Silver	Bronze
Singles WH1	Karin Suter-Erath; Switzerland	Son Ok-cha; South Korea	Elke Rongen; Germany
Singles WH1	Karin Suter-Erath; Switzerland	Son Ok-cha; South Korea	Sujirat Pookkham; Thailand
Singles WH2	Lee Sun-ae; South Korea	Emine Seckin; Turkey	Gertrud Salewski; Germany
Singles WH2	Lee Sun-ae; South Korea	Emine Seckin; Turkey	Yoko Egami; Japan
Singles SL4	Parul Parmar; India	Helle Sofie Sagøy; Norway	Katrin Seibert; Germany
Singles SL4	Parul Parmar; India	Helle Sofie Sagøy; Norway	Chanida Srinavakul; Thailand
Singles SU5	Mamiko Toyoda; Japan	Akiko Sugino; Japan	Julie Thrane; Denmark
Singles SU5	Mamiko Toyoda; Japan	Akiko Sugino; Japan	Zehra Baglar; Turkey
Singles SH6	Rachel Choong; England	Rebecca Bedford; England	Emma Farnham; Ireland
Singles SH6	Rachel Choong; England	Rebecca Bedford; England	Milena Hoffmann; Germany
Doubles WH1-WH2	(South Korea) Lee Sun-ee (South Korea) Son Ok-cha	(Thailand) Sujirat Pookkham (Switzerland) Karin Suter-Erath	(Germany) Valeska Knoblauch (Germany) Elke Rongen
Doubles WH1-WH2	(South Korea) Lee Sun-ee (South Korea) Son Ok-cha	(Thailand) Sujirat Pookkham (Switzerland) Karin Suter-Erath	(Japan) Yoko Egami (Japan) Rie Ogura
Doubles SL3-SU5	(Norway) Helle Sofie Sagøy (Germany) Katrin Seibert	(Thailand) Saensupa Nipada (Thailand) Chanida Srinavakul	(India) Parul Parmar (Thailand) Kamtam Wandee
Doubles SL3-SU5	(Norway) Helle Sofie Sagøy (Germany) Katrin Seibert	(Thailand) Saensupa Nipada (Thailand) Chanida Srinavakul	(Thailand) Paramee Panyachaem (Denmark) Julie Thrane

=== Mixed events ===
Event	Gold	Silver	Bronze
Doubles WH1	(Thailand) Homhual Jakarin (Thailand) Sujirat Pookkham	(South Korea) Lee Sam-seop (South Korea) Son Ok-cha	(Germany) Young-Chin Mi (Germany) Valeska Knoblauch
Doubles WH1	(Thailand) Homhual Jakarin (Thailand) Sujirat Pookkham	(South Korea) Lee Sam-seop (South Korea) Son Ok-cha	(Germany) Thomas Wandschneider (Switzerland) Karin Suter-Erath
Doubles WH2	(South Korea) Kim Kyung-hoon (South Korea) Lee Sun-ae	(Turkey) Avni Kertmen (Turkey) Emine Seckin	(Japan) Osamu Nagashima (Japan) Rie Ogura
Doubles WH2	(South Korea) Kim Kyung-hoon (South Korea) Lee Sun-ae	(Turkey) Avni Kertmen (Turkey) Emine Seckin	(Japan) Seiji Yamami (Japan) Yoko Egami
Doubles SL3-SU5	(Germany) Peter Schnitzler (Germany) Katrin Seibert	(Thailand) Dachathon Saengarayakul (Thailand) Saensupa Nipada	(Thailand) Chawart Kitichokwattana (Thailand) Chanida Srinavakul
Doubles SL3-SU5	(Germany) Peter Schnitzler (Germany) Katrin Seibert	(Thailand) Dachathon Saengarayakul (Thailand) Saensupa Nipada	(India) Manoj Sarkar (India) Parul Parmar
Doubles SH6	(England) Andrew Martin (England) Rachel Choong	(England) Jack Shephard (England) Rebecca Bedford	(Republic of Ireland) Luke Irvine (Republic of Ireland) Emma Farnham
Doubles SH6	(England) Andrew Martin (England) Rachel Choong	(England) Jack Shephard (England) Rebecca Bedford	(England) Isaak Dalglish (Germany) Milena Hoffmann

== Medal table ==
Rank	Nation	Gold	Silver	Bronze	Total
1	South Korea	6	4.5	0	10.5
2	India	3	0	5	8
3	England	2	4	2	8
4	Thailand	2	2.5	4.5	9
5	Malaysia	2	1	1	4
6	Germany	2	0	9.5	11.5
7	Japan	1	2	8	11
8	Switzerland	1	0.5	0.5	2
9	Vietnam	1	0	2.5	3.5
10	Ireland	1	0	2	3
11	Norway	0.5	1	0	1.5
12	France	0.5	0	0	0.5
13	Turkey	0	3	1	4
14	Chinese Taipei	0	2	1	3
15	Poland	0	1.5	0	1.5
16	Russia	0	0	2	2
16	Singapore	0	0	2	2
18	Denmark	0	0	1.5	1.5
18	Hong Kong	0	0	1.5	1.5
Totals (19 entries)		22	22	44	88

== See also ==
- 2013 BWF World Championships
