= Jan-Niklas Pott =

German para-badminton player

Personal information
- Born: 8 November 1993 (age 32) Kiel, Germany

Sport
- Country: Germany
- Sport: Badminton
- Handedness: Right

Men’s singles SL4 Men's doubles SL3–SL4 Mixed doubles SL3–SU5
- Highest ranking: 15 (MS 1 January 2019); 2 (MD with Pascal Wolter 2 April 2019); 3 (XD with Katrin Seibert 19 July 2022)
- Current ranking: 31 (MS); 26 (XD with Katrin Seibert) (17 September 2024)
Medal record
Men's para-badminton
Representing Germany
World Championships
Silver medal – second place	2013 Dortmund	Men's doubles
Silver medal – second place	2019 Basel	Mixed doubles
Bronze medal – third place	2011 Guatemala City	Men's doubles
Bronze medal – third place	2011 Guatemala City	Team
European Championships
Gold medal – first place	2014 Murcia	Men's doubles
Gold medal – first place	2018 Rodez	Men's doubles
Bronze medal – third place	2014 Murcia	Men's singles
Bronze medal – third place	2016 Beek	Men's doubles
Bronze medal – third place	2018 Rodez	Mixed doubles

Jan-Niklas Pott (born 8 November 1993) is a German para-badminton player. He competed in the men's singles SL4 event at the 2020 Summer Paralympics but did not advance to the knockout stage.

== Biography ==
Pott has tibial hypoplasia. He has a hereditarily shortened right leg without an ankle joint or growth plate, which is lengthened by a prosthesis.

== Achievements ==
=== World Championships ===
Men's doubles SL3–SL4

Year	Venue	Partner	Opponent	Score	Result
2011	Coliseo Deportivo, Guatemala City, Guatemala	(Guatemala) Raúl Anguiano	(Chinese Taipei) Lin Cheng-che (Chinese Taipei) Lin Yung-chang	18–21, 10–21	Bronze
2013	Helmut-Körnig-Halle, Dortmund, Germany	(England) Antony Forster	(Thailand) Chawarat Kitichokwattana (Thailand) Dachathon Saengarayakul	18–21, 14–21	Silver

Mixed doubles SL3–SU5

Year	Venue	Partner	Opponent	Score	Result
2019	St. Jakobshalle, Basel, Switzerland	(Germany) Katrin Seibert	(Indonesia) Hary Susanto (Indonesia) Leani Ratri Oktila	4–21, 11–21	Silver

=== European Championships ===
Men's singles SL4

Year	Venue	Opponent	Score	Result
2014	High Performance Center, Murcia, Spain	(France) Lucas Mazur	7–21, 15–21	Bronze

Men's doubles SL3–SL4

Year	Venue	Partner	Opponent	Score	Result
2014	High Performance Center, Murcia, Spain	(Spain) Simón Cruz Mondejar	(England) Daniel Lee (Scotland) Colin Leslie	21–13, 21–12	Gold
2016	Sporthal de Haamen, Beek, Netherlands	(Germany) Pascal Wolter	(France) Lucas Mazur (France) Mathieu Thomas	10–21, 17–21	Bronze
2018	Amphitheatre Gymnasium, Rodez, France	(Germany) Pascal Wolter	(France) Guillaume Gailly (France) Mathieu Thomas	22–20, 21–14	Gold

Mixed doubles SL3–SU5

Year	Venue	Partner	Opponent	Score	Result
2018	Amphitheatre Gymnasium, Rodez, France	(Norway) Helle Sofie Sagøy	(France) Lucas Mazur (France) Faustine Noël	14–21, 11–21	Bronze

=== International tournaments (2011–2021) (5 titles, 8 runners-up) ===
Men's singles SL4

Year	Tournament	Opponent	Score	Result
2013 (Note: This tournament uses a round robin system.)	Spanish Para-Badminton International	(Scotland) David Purdie	21–19, 21–13	(gold) Winner
2013	Spanish Para-Badminton International	(England) Antony Forster	18–21, 21–19, 22–20	(gold) Winner
2013	Spanish Para-Badminton International	(England) Bobby Griffin	21–18, 21–19	(gold) Winner

Men's doubles SL3–SL4

Year	Tournament	Partner	Opponent	Score	Result
2012	French Para-Badminton International	(England) Antony Forster	(Thailand) Chawarat Kitichokwattana (Thailand) Dachathon Saengarayakul	15–21, 22–24	(silver) Runner-up
2013	Spanish Para-Badminton International	(England) Antony Forster	(Nigeria) Jimoh Adisa Folawiyo (Spain) Moises Pujante Gomez	21–1, 21–5	(silver) Runner-up
2013	Spanish Para-Badminton International	(England) Antony Forster	(England) Bobby Griffin (Spain) Pablo Ramos	21–11, 21–12	(silver) Runner-up
2013	Spanish Para-Badminton International	(England) Antony Forster	(Scotland) Nail Jarvie (Scotland) David Purdie	21–17, 21–5	(silver) Runner-up
2013	Spanish Para-Badminton International	(England) Antony Forster	(South Korea) Kim Gi-yeon (Poland) Bartłomiej Mróz	8–21, 15–21	(silver) Runner-up
2016	Turkish Para-Badminton International	(England) Bobby Griffin	(Poland) Bartłomiej Mróz (Turkey) İlker Tuzcu	16–21, 18–21	(silver) Runner-up
2017	Irish Para-Badminton International	(Germany) Pascal Wolter	(France) Lucas Mazur (France) Mathieu Thomas	15–21, 20–22	(silver) Runner-up
2018	Spanish Para-Badminton International	(Germany) Pascal Wolter	(Thailand) Siripong Teamarrom (France) Mathieu Thomas	21–17, 14–21, 20–22	(silver) Runner-up
2018	Japan Para-Badminton International	(Germany) Pascal Wolter	(Japan) Daisuke Fujihara (Thailand) Siripong Teamarrom	14–21, 21–18, 10–21	(silver) Runner-up
2018	Denmark Para-Badminton International	(Sweden) Rickard Nilsson	(Netherlands) Joshua Donker (Netherlands) Mark Modderman	21–17, 21–6	(gold) Winner
2019	Dubai Para-Badminton International	(Germany) Pascal Wolter	(Indonesia) Dwiyoko (Indonesia) Fredy Setiawan	15–21, 18–21	(silver) Runner-up

Mixed doubles SL3–SU5

Year	Tournament	Partner	Opponent	Score	Result
2015	Spanish Para-Badminton International	(Germany) Katrin Seibert	(India) Manoj Sarkar (India) Parul Parmar	21–13, 17–21, 21–14	(gold) Winner
2016	Irish Para-Badminton International	(Norway) Helle Sofie Sagøy	(France) Lucas Mazur (France) Faustine Noël	17–21, 8–21	(silver) Runner-up
2017	Spanish Para-Badminton International	(Norway) Helle Sofie Sagøy	(Germany) Marcel Adam (Germany) Katrin Seibert	21–17, 16–21, 21–19	(gold) Winner
2018	Denmark Para-Badminton International	(Norway) Helle Sofie Sagøy	(Scotland) Colin Leslie (Denmark) Cathrine Rosengren	26–24, 21–11	(gold) Winner
2018	Denmark Para-Badminton International	(Norway) Helle Sofie Sagøy	(Ukraine) Oleksandr Chyrkov (Ukraine) Ivanna Redka	21–8, 21–7	(gold) Winner
2018	Denmark Para-Badminton International	(Norway) Helle Sofie Sagøy	(Brazil) Rogério Oliveira (Scotland) Mary Margaret Wilson	21–18, 21–8	(gold) Winner
