= European Para-Badminton Championships =

Badminton championships

- Most recent season or competition: #2025 Istanbul
- Sport: Para-badminton
- Founder: Para Badminton World Federation (now part of the BWF)
- First season: 1995

The European Para-Badminton Championships is a tournament organized by the Para Badminton World Federation (PBWF) which has now merged with the BWF. This tournament is hosted to crown the best para-badminton players in Europe.

The inaugural edition of the tournament was hosted in Stoke Mandeville, England in 1995.

== Championships ==
=== Individual championships ===
The table below states all the host cities (and their countries) of the European Championships.

Year	Number	Host City	Host Country	Events	Notes
1995	1	Stoke Mandeville	England	-	
1997	2	Dortmund	Germany	-	
1999	3	Tel Aviv	Israel	-	
2004	4	Tilburg	Netherlands	-	
2006	5	La Rinconada	Spain	16	
2008	6	Dortmund	Germany	16	
2010	7	Filzbach	Switzerland	16	
2012	8	Dortmund	Germany	17	
2014	9	Murcia	Spain	16	
2016	10	Beek	Netherlands	17	
2018	11	Rodez	France	22	
2020	–	Dublin	Ireland	Cancelled due to Covid 19 pandemic	
2023	–	Rotterdam	Netherlands	22	part of 2023 European; Para Championships
2025	12	Istanbul	Turkey	22	
2027	13	Geneva	Switzerland		

== All-time medal table ==
Rank	Nation	Gold	Silver	Bronze	Total
1	England (ENG)	21.5	12.5	23	57
2	France (FRA)	21	23	37	81
3	Germany (GER)	19.5	14.5	35.5	69.5
4	Turkey (TUR)	9	9	6.5	24.5
5	Netherlands (NED)	7	5.5	8	20.5
6	Switzerland (SUI)	5.5	5.5	1	12
7	Israel (ISR)	4	3.5	11.5	19
8	Norway (NOR)	3	0	0.5	3.5
9	Russia (RUS)	2	3.5	17	22.5
10	Poland (POL)	2	3	2.5	7.5
11	Denmark (DEN)	2	2.5	0.5	5
12	Ireland (IRL)	1.5	2.5	2	6
13	Scotland (SCO)	1	0.5	10.5	12
14	Spain (ESP)	0	4	12.5	16.5
15	Sweden (SWE)	0	2	1	3
16	Wales (WAL)	0	1	1	2
17	Ukraine (UKR)	0	1	0	1
18	Belgium (BEL)	0	0.5	2	2.5
19	Finland (FIN)	0	0	3	3
20	Austria (AUT)	0	0	2	2
21	Portugal (POR)	0	0	1	1
22	Serbia (SER)	0	0	0.5	0.5
Totals (22 entries)		99	94	178.5	371.5

== Past winners ==
=== 2006 La Rinconada ===
Event	Gold	Silver	Bronze
Men's singles BMW2	(Germany) Thomas Wandschneider	(Switzerland) Walter Rauber	(Israel) Shimon Shalom
Men's singles BMW2	(Germany) Thomas Wandschneider	(Switzerland) Walter Rauber	(Netherlands) Ferdinand Hoeke
Men's singles BMW3	(Israel) Amir Levi	(Netherlands) Quincy Michielsen	(Israel) Macbal Shefanya
Men's singles BMW3	(Israel) Amir Levi	(Netherlands) Quincy Michielsen	(Israel) Yossi Baba
Men's singles BMSTL1	(Russia) Sergey Nefedov	(Spain) Alfonso Otero	(Spain) Silvino Gata
Men's singles BMSTL2	(Germany) Pascal Wolter	(Russia) Ramil Yuldashev	(Germany) Jens Behnke
Men's singles BMSTL2	(Germany) Pascal Wolter	(Russia) Ramil Yuldashev	(Spain) Juan Ramirez
Men's singles BMSTL3	(Germany) Peter Schnitzler	(Russia) Eduard Barkanov	(Spain) Vincente Henares
Men's singles BMSTL3	(Germany) Peter Schnitzler	(Russia) Eduard Barkanov	(Spain) Fulgencio Garcia
Men's singles BMSTU5	(Israel) Eyal Bachar	(Germany) Frank Dietel	(Russia) Mikhail Chiviksin
Men's singles BMSTU5	(Israel) Eyal Bachar	(Germany) Frank Dietel	(England) Antony Forster
Men's doubles BMW2	(Germany) Avni Kertmen (Germany) Thomas Wandschneider	(Netherlands) Ferdinand Hoeke (Switzerland) Walter Rauber	(Spain) Airam Fernandez (Spain) Francisco Pineda
Men's doubles BMW2	(Germany) Avni Kertmen (Germany) Thomas Wandschneider	(Netherlands) Ferdinand Hoeke (Switzerland) Walter Rauber	(Israel) Shimon Shalom (France) David Toupé
Men's doubles BMW3	(Israel) Amir Levi (Israel) Macbal Shefanya	(Netherlands) Ton Hollaar (Netherlands) Quincy Michielsen	(Germany) Stefan Haas (Germany) David Holz
Men's doubles BMW3	(Israel) Amir Levi (Israel) Macbal Shefanya	(Netherlands) Ton Hollaar (Netherlands) Quincy Michielsen	(Israel) Yossi Baba (Israel) Aviad Brazilai
Men's doubles BMSTL2	(Germany) Jens Behnke (Germany) Pascal Wolter	(Russia) Oleg Dontsov (Russia) Ramil Yuldashev	(England) Meva Singh Dhesi (England) William Smith
Men's doubles BMSTL3	(Germany) Lutz Sauppe (Germany) Peter Schnitzler	(Spain) Fulgencio Garcia (Israel) Eli Karadi	(Spain) Vincente Henares (Spain) Juan Ramirez
Men's doubles BMSTL3	(Germany) Lutz Sauppe (Germany) Peter Schnitzler	(Spain) Fulgencio Garcia (Israel) Eli Karadi	(Russia) Eduard Barkanov (Russia) Valery Kurochkin
Men's doubles BMSTU5	(Germany) Frank Dietel (England) Antony Forester	(Israel) Eyal Bachar (Israel) Jonathan Levy	(Germany) Martin Fischbacher (Germany) Hans-Peter Heil
Women's singles BMW2	(Germany) Elke Rongen	(Germany) Mine Korkmaz	(Germany) Carola Spellier
Women's singles BMW2	(Germany) Elke Rongen	(Germany) Mine Korkmaz	(England) Linda Roche
Women's singles BMW3	(Netherlands) Nicole Kettenis	(Netherlands) Carol de Meijer	(Germany) Tamara Bepperling
Women's doubles BMW2–BMW3	(Netherlands) Carol de Meijer (Netherlands) Nicole Kettenis	(Germany) Mine Korkmaz (Germany) Carola Spellier	(France) Sofia Balsalobre (Germany) Marta Rodriguez
Women's doubles BMW2–BMW3	(Netherlands) Carol de Meijer (Netherlands) Nicole Kettenis	(Germany) Mine Korkmaz (Germany) Carola Spellier	(Germany) Marion Maasch (Germany) Gertrud Salewski
Mixed doubles BMW2	(Germany) Avni Kertmen (Germany) Mine Korkmaz	(Germany) Manfred Steinhart (Germany) Elke Rongen	(France) David Toupé (Germany) Irmgard Wandt
Mixed doubles BMW2	(Germany) Avni Kertmen (Germany) Mine Korkmaz	(Germany) Manfred Steinhart (Germany) Elke Rongen	(Spain) Francisco Pineda (Spain) Sofia Balsalobre
Mixed doubles BMW3	(Netherlands) Quincy Michielsen (Netherlands) Carol de Meijer	(Netherlands) Ton Hollaar (Netherlands) Nicole Kettenis	(Germany) Stefan Haas (Germany) Marion Maasch
Mixed doubles BMW3	(Netherlands) Quincy Michielsen (Netherlands) Carol de Meijer	(Netherlands) Ton Hollaar (Netherlands) Nicole Kettenis	(Germany) Bernd Worf (Germany) Tamara Bepperling

=== 2012 Dortmund ===
Event	Gold	Silver	Bronze
Men's singles WH1	(Germany) Thomas Wandschneider	(France) David Toupé	(Spain) Javier Fernández
Men's singles WH1	(Germany) Thomas Wandschneider	(France) David Toupé	(Russia) Pavel Popov
Men's singles WH2	(England) Martin Rooke	(England) Gobi Ranganathan	(Spain) José Guillermo Lama Seco
Men's singles WH2	(England) Martin Rooke	(England) Gobi Ranganathan	(Germany) David Holz
Men's singles SL3	(Scotland) Alan Oliver	(England) Daniel Lee	(Spain) Simón Cruz Mondejar
Men's singles SL3	(Scotland) Alan Oliver	(England) Daniel Lee	(Germany) Tim Haller
Men's singles SL4	(Germany) Pascal Wolter	(England) Bruno Forbes	(Germany) Peter Schnitzler
Men's singles SL4	(Germany) Pascal Wolter	(England) Bruno Forbes	(Germany) Jan-Niklas Pott
Men's singles SU5	(Turkey) İlker Tuzcu	(Poland) Bartłomiej Mróz	(Israel) Eyal Bechar
Men's singles SU5	(Turkey) İlker Tuzcu	(Poland) Bartłomiej Mróz	(Russia) Mikhail Chiviksin
Men's singles SH6	(Republic of Ireland) Niall McVeigh	(England) Andrew Martin	(Russia) Alexander Mekhdiev
Men's singles SH6	(Republic of Ireland) Niall McVeigh	(England) Andrew Martin	(England) Oliver Clarke
Men's doubles WH1	(Germany) Thomas Wandschneider (Turkey) Avni Kertmen	(France) Pascal Barrillon (France) David Toupé	(Russia) Pavel Popov (Russia) Yuri Stephanov
Men's doubles WH1	(Germany) Thomas Wandschneider (Turkey) Avni Kertmen	(France) Pascal Barrillon (France) David Toupé	(France) Sebastien Martin (Germany) Young-chin Mi
Men's doubles WH2	(England) Martin Rooke (England) Gobi Ranganathan	(Spain) Javier Fernández (Spain) José Guillermo Lama Seco	(Germany) David Holz (Germany) Manfred Steinhart
Men's doubles SL3	(Germany) Tim Haller (Germany) Pascal Wolter	(Germany) Max Altenkamp (Germany) Heiko Vuellers	(England) Meva Singh Dhesi (England) Naill Jarvie
Men's doubles SL3	(Germany) Tim Haller (Germany) Pascal Wolter	(Germany) Max Altenkamp (Germany) Heiko Vuellers	(Netherlands) Eddy Boerman (Netherlands) Guus Maassen
Doubles SL4	(England) Antony Forster (Germany) Jan-Niklas Pott	(Germany) Peter Schnitzler (Germany) Katrin Seibert	(England) Bruno Forbes (England) Daniel Lee
Doubles SL4	(England) Antony Forster (Germany) Jan-Niklas Pott	(Germany) Peter Schnitzler (Germany) Katrin Seibert	(Scotland) Steven Moodie (Scotland) Alan Oliver
Doubles SU5	(Russia) Mikhail Chiviksin (Turkey) İlker Tuzcu	(Germany) Frank Dietel (Germany) Sebastian Müller	(Israel) Eyal Bachar (Denmark) Julie Thrane
Women's singles WH1	(Switzerland) Karin Suter-Erath	(Switzerland) Sonja Häsler	(Israel) Nina Gorodetzky
Women's singles WH1	(Switzerland) Karin Suter-Erath	(Switzerland) Sonja Häsler	(Germany) Elke Rongen
Women's singles WH2	(Netherlands) Ilse van de Burgwal	(Turkey) Emine Seçkin	(Netherlands) Inge Bakker
Women's singles SH6	(England) Rachel Choong	(Germany) Milena Hoffmann	(Republic of Ireland) Emma Farnham
Women's singles SH6	(England) Rachel Choong	(Germany) Milena Hoffmann	(Germany) Anna Spindelndreier
Women's doubles WH1–WH2	(Netherlands) Inge Bakker (Netherlands) Ilse van de Burgwal	(Switzerland) Sonja Häsler (Switzerland) Karin Suter-Erath	(Germany) Valeska Knoblauch (Germany) Elke Rongen
Women's doubles WH1–WH2	(Netherlands) Inge Bakker (Netherlands) Ilse van de Burgwal	(Switzerland) Sonja Häsler (Switzerland) Karin Suter-Erath	(Germany) Monika Meinhold (Germany) Gertrud Salewski
Mixed doubles WH1	(Germany) Thomas Wandschneider (Switzerland) Karin Suter-Erath	(France) David Toupé (Switzerland) Sonja Häsler	(Germany) Young-chin Mi (Germany) Valeska Knoblauch
Mixed doubles WH1	(Germany) Thomas Wandschneider (Switzerland) Karin Suter-Erath	(France) David Toupé (Switzerland) Sonja Häsler	(Israel) Schalom Kalvansky (Israel) Nina Gorodetzky
Mixed doubles WH2	(Netherlands) Jordy Brouwer van Gonzenbach (Netherlands) Ilse van de Burgwal	(Turkey) Avni Kertmen (Turkey) Emine Seçkin	(England) Gobi Ranganathan (Netherlands) Inge Bakker

=== 2014 Murcia ===
Event	Gold	Silver	Bronze
Men's singles WH1	(Germany) Thomas Wandschneider	(France) David Toupé	(Germany) Young-chin Mi
Men's singles WH1	(Germany) Thomas Wandschneider	(France) David Toupé	(England) Connor Dua-Harper
Men's singles WH2	(England) Martin Rooke	(France) François Nalborczyk	(Netherlands) Jordy Brouwer von Gonzenbach
Men's singles WH2	(England) Martin Rooke	(France) François Nalborczyk	(Spain) José Guillermo Lama Seco
Men's singles SL3	(England) Daniel Bethell	(Spain) Simón Cruz Mondejar	(Scotland) Colin Leslie
Men's singles SL3	(England) Daniel Bethell	(Spain) Simón Cruz Mondejar	(Scotland) Alan Oliver
Men's singles SL4	(France) Lucas Mazur	(England) Antony Forster	(Germany) Jan-Niklas Pott
Men's singles SL4	(France) Lucas Mazur	(England) Antony Forster	(Sweden) Rickard Nilsson
Men's singles SU5	(Turkey) İlker Tuzcu	(Poland) Bartłomiej Mróz	(Israel) Eyal Bechar
Men's singles SU5	(Turkey) İlker Tuzcu	(Poland) Bartłomiej Mróz	(Russia) Mikhail Chiviksin
Men's singles SH6	(England) Andrew Martin	(Republic of Ireland) Niall McVeigh	(England) Krysten Coombs
Men's singles SH6	(England) Andrew Martin	(Republic of Ireland) Niall McVeigh	(England) Jack Shephard
Men's doubles WH1–WH2	(Germany) Thomas Wandschneider (France) David Toupé	(Turkey) Avni Kertmen (England) Martin Rooke	(England) Connor Dua-Harper (England) David Follett
Men's doubles WH1–WH2	(Germany) Thomas Wandschneider (France) David Toupé	(Turkey) Avni Kertmen (England) Martin Rooke	(Netherlands) Jordy Brouwer von Gonzenbach (Germany) Young-chin Mi
Men's doubles SL3–SL4	(Spain) Simón Cruz Mondejar (Germany) Jan-Niklas Pott	(England) Daniel Lee (Scotland) Colin Leslie	(France) Geoffrey Byzery (France) Lucas Mazur
Men's doubles SL3–SL4	(Spain) Simón Cruz Mondejar (Germany) Jan-Niklas Pott	(England) Daniel Lee (Scotland) Colin Leslie	(England) Daniel Bethell (England) Bobby Griffin
Men's doubles SH6	(Republic of Ireland) Niall Mcveigh (Russia) Alexander Mekhdiev	(England) Isaak Dalglish (England) Andrew Martin	(England) Krysten Coombs (England) Jack Shephard
Men's doubles SH6	(Republic of Ireland) Niall Mcveigh (Russia) Alexander Mekhdiev	(England) Isaak Dalglish (England) Andrew Martin	(Poland) Grzegorz Jednaki (Scotland) Robert Laing
Doubles SU5	(Poland) Bartłomiej Mróz (Turkey) İlker Tuzcu	(Israel) Eyal Bachar (France) Colin Kerouanton	(England) James Binnie (Netherlands) Mark Modderman
Doubles SU5	(Poland) Bartłomiej Mróz (Turkey) İlker Tuzcu	(Israel) Eyal Bachar (France) Colin Kerouanton	(Russia) Mikhail Chiviksin (Germany) Frank Dietel
Women's singles WH1	(Switzerland) Karin Suter-Erath	(Germany) Valeska Knoblauch	(Switzerland) Sonja Häsler
Women's singles WH1	(Switzerland) Karin Suter-Erath	(Germany) Valeska Knoblauch	(Israel) Nina Gorodetzky
Women's singles WH2	(Turkey) Emine Seçkin	(Turkey) Narin Uluç	(Russia) Liliia Prokofeva
Women's singles WH2	(Turkey) Emine Seçkin	(Turkey) Narin Uluç	(Scotland) Fiona Christie
Women's singles SU5	(Norway) Helle Sofie Sagøy	(Denmark) Julie Thrane	(Turkey) Zehra Bağlar
Women's singles SU5	(Norway) Helle Sofie Sagøy	(Denmark) Julie Thrane	(France) Thiéfaine Auvert
Women's doubles WH1–WH2	(Switzerland) Sonja Häsler (Switzerland) Karin Suter-Erath	(Germany) Valeska Knoblauch (Germany) Elke Rongen	(Israel) Nina Gorodetzky (Russia) Liliia Prokofeva
Women's doubles WH1–WH2	(Switzerland) Sonja Häsler (Switzerland) Karin Suter-Erath	(Germany) Valeska Knoblauch (Germany) Elke Rongen	(Turkey) Mine Korkmaz (Turkey) Emine Seçkin
Mixed doubles WH1–WH2	(England) Martin Rooke (Switzerland) Karin Suter-Erath	(France) David Toupé (Switzerland) Sonja Häsler	(Netherlands) Jordy Brouwer von Gonzenbach (Germany) Elke Rongen
Mixed doubles WH1–WH2	(England) Martin Rooke (Switzerland) Karin Suter-Erath	(France) David Toupé (Switzerland) Sonja Häsler	(Turkey) Avni Kertmen (Turkey) Emine Seçkin
Mixed doubles SL3–SU5	(England) Bobby Griffin (Norway) Helle Sofie Sagøy	(England) Daniel Bethell (Denmark) Julie Thrane	(Turkey) Muammer Çankaya (Turkey) Zehra Bağlar
Mixed doubles SL3–SU5	(England) Bobby Griffin (Norway) Helle Sofie Sagøy	(England) Daniel Bethell (Denmark) Julie Thrane	(France) Pascal Baron (France) Thiéfaine Auvert

=== 2016 Beek ===
Event	Gold	Silver	Bronze
Men's singles WH1	(Germany) Thomas Wandschneider	(France) David Toupé	(England) Connor Dua-Harper
Men's singles WH1	(Germany) Thomas Wandschneider	(France) David Toupé	(Russia) Yuri Stephanov
Men's singles WH2	(England) Martin Rooke	(Netherlands) Jordy Brouwer von Gonzenbach	(England) Gobi Ranganathan
Men's singles WH2	(England) Martin Rooke	(Netherlands) Jordy Brouwer von Gonzenbach	(Finland) Thomas Puska
Men's singles SL3	(England) Daniel Bethell	(Germany) Pascal Wolter	(France) Mathieu Thomas
Men's singles SL3	(England) Daniel Bethell	(Germany) Pascal Wolter	(Scotland) Colin Leslie
Men's singles SL4	(France) Lucas Mazur	(Sweden) Rickard Nilsson	(England) Antony Forster
Men's singles SL4	(France) Lucas Mazur	(Sweden) Rickard Nilsson	(France) Paul Edinger
Men's singles SU5	(Turkey) İlker Tuzcu	(Poland) Bartłomiej Mróz	(France) Méril Loquette
Men's singles SU5	(Turkey) İlker Tuzcu	(Poland) Bartłomiej Mróz	(Wales) David Jack Wilson
Men's singles SH6	(England) Krysten Coombs	(Republic of Ireland) Niall McVeigh	(England) Andrew Martin
Men's singles SH6	(England) Krysten Coombs	(Republic of Ireland) Niall McVeigh	(England) Jack Shephard
Men's doubles WH1–WH2	(Germany) Thomas Wandschneider (England) Connor Dua-Harper	(France) David Toupé (England) Martin Rooke	(Germany) David Holz (Germany) Young-chin Mi
Men's doubles WH1–WH2	(Germany) Thomas Wandschneider (England) Connor Dua-Harper	(France) David Toupé (England) Martin Rooke	(Russia) Pavel Popov (Russia) Yuri Stephanov
Men's doubles SL3–SL4	(France) Lucas Mazur (France) Mathieu Thomas	(Germany) Marcel Adam (Spain) Simón Cruz Mondejar	(Germany) Jan-Niklas Pott (Germany) Pascal Wolter
Men's doubles SL3–SL4	(France) Lucas Mazur (France) Mathieu Thomas	(Germany) Marcel Adam (Spain) Simón Cruz Mondejar	(England) Daniel Bethell (England) Bobby Griffin
Men's doubles SU5	(Poland) Bartłomiej Mróz (Turkey) İlker Tuzcu	(France) Méril Loquette (Wales) David Jack Wilson	(England) James Binnie (Netherlands) Mark Modderman
Men's doubles SU5	(Poland) Bartłomiej Mróz (Turkey) İlker Tuzcu	(France) Méril Loquette (Wales) David Jack Wilson	(Russia) Mikhail Chiviksin (Russia) Oleg Dontsov
Doubles SH6	(England) Krysten Coombs (England) Jack Shephard	(England) Andrew Martin (Republic of Ireland) Niall Mcveigh	(Russia) Alexander Mekhdiev (Republic of Ireland) Andrew Moorcroft
Doubles SH6	(England) Krysten Coombs (England) Jack Shephard	(England) Andrew Martin (Republic of Ireland) Niall Mcveigh	(England) Isaak Dalglish (Scotland) Robert Laing
Women's singles WH1	(Switzerland) Karin Suter-Erath	(Germany) Valeska Knoblauch	(Austria) Henriett Koósz
Women's singles WH1	(Switzerland) Karin Suter-Erath	(Germany) Valeska Knoblauch	(Israel) Nina Gorodetzky
Women's singles WH2	(Turkey) Emine Seçkin	(Turkey) Narin Uluç	(France) Paméla Masse
Women's singles WH2	(Turkey) Emine Seçkin	(Turkey) Narin Uluç	(Scotland) Fiona Christie
Women's singles SL4	(Germany) Katrin Seibert	(France) Faustine Noël	(France) Véronique Braud
Women's singles SU5	(Denmark) Cathrine Rosengren	(Denmark) Astrid Lilhav Riis	(Denmark) Julie Thrane
Women's singles SU5	(Denmark) Cathrine Rosengren	(Denmark) Astrid Lilhav Riis	(Netherlands) Megan Hollander
Women's doubles WH1–WH2	(Turkey) Emine Seçkin (Switzerland) Karin Suter-Erath	(Germany) Valeska Knoblauch (Germany) Elke Rongen	(Belgium) To Man-kei (Russia) Liliia Prokofeva
Women's doubles WH1–WH2	(Turkey) Emine Seçkin (Switzerland) Karin Suter-Erath	(Germany) Valeska Knoblauch (Germany) Elke Rongen	(Turkey) Mine Korkmaz (Turkey) Narin Uluç
Mixed doubles WH1–WH2	(England) Martin Rooke (Switzerland) Karin Suter-Erath	(France) David Toupé (Turkey) Narin Uluç	(Germany) Young-chin Mi (Germany) Valeska Knoblauch
Mixed doubles WH1–WH2	(England) Martin Rooke (Switzerland) Karin Suter-Erath	(France) David Toupé (Turkey) Narin Uluç	(Turkey) Avni Kertmen (Turkey) Emine Seçkin
Mixed doubles SL3–SU5	(France) Lucas Mazur (France) Faustine Noël	(France) Geoffrey Byzery (Denmark) Cathrine Rosengren	(Germany) Peter Schnitzler (Germany) Katrin Seibert
Mixed doubles SL3–SU5	(France) Lucas Mazur (France) Faustine Noël	(France) Geoffrey Byzery (Denmark) Cathrine Rosengren	(France) Hugo Saumier (France) Véronique Braud
Mixed doubles SH6	(England) Andrew Martin (England) Rachel Choong	(England) Jack Shephard (England) Rebecca Bedford	(England) Isaak Dalglish (Poland) Maria Bartusz
Mixed doubles SH6	(England) Andrew Martin (England) Rachel Choong	(England) Jack Shephard (England) Rebecca Bedford	(Scotland) Robert Laing (Scotland) Deidre Nagle

=== 2018 Rodez ===
Event	Gold	Silver	Bronze
Men's singles WH1	(Germany) Thomas Wandschneider	(France) David Toupé	(Germany) Young-chin Mi
Men's singles WH1	(Germany) Thomas Wandschneider	(France) David Toupé	(Russia) Konstantin Afinogenov
Men's singles WH2	(England) Martin Rooke	(Israel) Amir Levi	(Finland) Thomas Puska
Men's singles WH2	(England) Martin Rooke	(Israel) Amir Levi	(Germany) Rick Cornell Hellmann
Men's singles SL3	(England) Daniel Bethell	(Ukraine) Oleksandr Chyrkov	(France) Mathieu Thomas
Men's singles SL3	(England) Daniel Bethell	(Ukraine) Oleksandr Chyrkov	(Germany) Pascal Wolter
Men's singles SL4	(France) Lucas Mazur	(Sweden) Rickard Nilsson	(Germany) Tim Haller
Men's singles SL4	(France) Lucas Mazur	(Sweden) Rickard Nilsson	(Russia) Oleg Dontsov
Men's singles SU5	(Poland) Bartłomiej Mróz	(Turkey) İlker Tuzcu	(France) Guillaume Charlot
Men's singles SU5	(Poland) Bartłomiej Mróz	(Turkey) İlker Tuzcu	(France) Méril Loquette
Men's singles SH6	(England) Jack Shephard	(England) Krysten Coombs	(England) Andrew Martin
Men's singles SH6	(England) Jack Shephard	(England) Krysten Coombs	(France) Fabien Morat
Men's doubles WH1–WH2	(Germany) Thomas Wandschneider (England) Martin Rooke	(France) David Toupé (Israel) Amir Levi	(Germany) Rick Cornell Hellmann (Germany) Young-chin Mi
Men's doubles WH1–WH2	(Germany) Thomas Wandschneider (England) Martin Rooke	(France) David Toupé (Israel) Amir Levi	(England) Connor Dua-Harper (Russia) Ilya Pargeev
Men's doubles SL3–SL4	(Germany) Jan-Niklas Pott (Germany) Pascal Wolter	(France) Guillaume Gailly (France) Mathieu Thomas	(England) Daniel Bethell (England) Bobby Griffin
Men's doubles SL3–SL4	(Germany) Jan-Niklas Pott (Germany) Pascal Wolter	(France) Guillaume Gailly (France) Mathieu Thomas	(England) Antony Forster (Scotland) Colin Leslie
Men's doubles SU5	(Poland) Bartłomiej Mróz (Turkey) İlker Tuzcu	(France) Méril Loquette (France) Lucas Mazur	(Russia) Oleg Dontsov (Russia) Pavel Kulikov
Men's doubles SU5	(Poland) Bartłomiej Mróz (Turkey) İlker Tuzcu	(France) Méril Loquette (France) Lucas Mazur	(Russia) Mikhail Chiviksin (Spain) Pablo Serrano
Men's doubles SH6	(England) Krysten Coombs (England) Jack Shephard	(England) Andrew Martin (England) Isaak Dalglish	(Russia) Alexander Mekhdiev (France) Fabien Morat
Men's doubles SH6	(England) Krysten Coombs (England) Jack Shephard	(England) Andrew Martin (England) Isaak Dalglish	(Republic of Ireland) Andrew Moorcroft (England) Robert Laing
Women's singles WH1	(Germany) Valeska Knoblauch	(Switzerland) Karin Suter-Erath	(Austria) Henriett Koósz
Women's singles WH1	(Germany) Valeska Knoblauch	(Switzerland) Karin Suter-Erath	(Belgium) To Man-kei
Women's singles WH2	(Turkey) Emine Seçkin	(Turkey) Narin Uluç	(Spain) Marcela Quinteros
Women's singles WH2	(Turkey) Emine Seçkin	(Turkey) Narin Uluç	(Scotland) Fiona Christie
Women's singles SL3	(Poland) Katarzyna Ziębik	(France) Coraline Bergeron	(France) Catherine Naudin
Women's singles SL4	(Norway) Helle Sofie Sagøy	(France) Faustine Noël	(Germany) Katrin Seibert
Women's singles SL4	(Norway) Helle Sofie Sagøy	(France) Faustine Noël	(France) Véronique Braud
Women's singles SU5	(Denmark) Cathrine Rosengren	(Turkey) Zehra Bağlar	(Netherlands) Megan Hollander
Women's singles SU5	(Denmark) Cathrine Rosengren	(Turkey) Zehra Bağlar	(Portugal) Beatriz Monteiro
Women's singles SH6	(England) Rachel Choong	(England) Rebecca Bedford	(Poland) Oliwia Szmigiel
Women's singles SH6	(England) Rachel Choong	(England) Rebecca Bedford	(Poland) Maria Bartusz
Women's doubles WH1–WH2	(Switzerland) Cynthia Mathez (Switzerland) Karin Suter-Erath	(Turkey) Emine Seçkin (Belgium) To Man-kei	(Finland) Heidi Manninen (Finland) Mirka Seuina Rautakoski
Women's doubles WH1–WH2	(Switzerland) Cynthia Mathez (Switzerland) Karin Suter-Erath	(Turkey) Emine Seçkin (Belgium) To Man-kei	(Germany) Valeska Knoblauch (Germany) Elke Rongen
Women's doubles SL3–SU5	(Norway) Helle Sofie Sagøy (Germany) Katrin Seibert	(France) Coraline Bergeron (Denmark) Cathrine Rosengren	(Turkey) Zehra Bağlar (Poland) Katarzyna Ziębik
Women's doubles SL3–SU5	(Norway) Helle Sofie Sagøy (Germany) Katrin Seibert	(France) Coraline Bergeron (Denmark) Cathrine Rosengren	(France) Véronique Braud (England) Emma Louise Stoner
Women's doubles SH6	(England) Rachel Choong (England) Rebecca Bedford	(Poland) Daria Bujnicka (Poland) Oliwia Szmigiel	(Russia) Irina Borisova (Denmark) Simone Emilie Meyer Larsen
Women's doubles SH6	(England) Rachel Choong (England) Rebecca Bedford	(Poland) Daria Bujnicka (Poland) Oliwia Szmigiel	(Poland) Maria Bartusz (Scotland) Deidre Nagle
Mixed doubles WH1–WH2	(Israel) Amir Levi (Israel) Nina Gorodetzky	(Russia) Konstantin Afinogenov (Turkey) Emine Seçkin	(Germany) Young-chin Mi (Germany) Valeska Knoblauch
Mixed doubles WH1–WH2	(Israel) Amir Levi (Israel) Nina Gorodetzky	(Russia) Konstantin Afinogenov (Turkey) Emine Seçkin	(Netherlands) Jordy Brouwer von Gonzenbach (Belgium) To Man-kei
Mixed doubles SL3–SU5	(France) Lucas Mazur (France) Faustine Noël	(Germany) Marcel Adam (Germany) Katrin Seibert	(France) Hugo Saumier (France) Véronique Braud
Mixed doubles SL3–SU5	(France) Lucas Mazur (France) Faustine Noël	(Germany) Marcel Adam (Germany) Katrin Seibert	(Germany) Jan-Niklas Pott (Norway) Helle Sofie Sagøy
Mixed doubles SH6	(England) Andrew Martin (England) Rachel Choong	(England) Isaak Dalglish (Poland) Maria Bartusz	(Scotland) Robert Laing (England) Rebecca Bedford
Mixed doubles SH6	(England) Andrew Martin (England) Rachel Choong	(England) Isaak Dalglish (Poland) Maria Bartusz	(Serbia) Djordje Koprivica (Poland) Oliwia Szmigiel

=== 2023 Rotterdam ===
This edition of the championships formed part of the 2023 European Para Championships event.

=== 2025 Istanbul ===
Event	Gold	Silver	Bronze
Men's singles WH1	(Italy) Yuri Ferrigno	(Spain) Francisco Motero	(Czech Republic) Kamil Šnajdar
Men's singles WH1	(Italy) Yuri Ferrigno	(Spain) Francisco Motero	(France) David Toupé
Men's singles WH2	(Germany) Rick Cornell Hellmann	(Switzerland) Luca Olgiati	(Switzerland) Marc Elmer
Men's singles WH2	(Germany) Rick Cornell Hellmann	(Switzerland) Luca Olgiati	(France) Thomas Jakobs
Men's singles SL3	(England) Daniel Bethell	(Ukraine) Oleksandr Chyrkov	(France) Mathieu Thomas
Men's singles SL3	(England) Daniel Bethell	(Ukraine) Oleksandr Chyrkov	(Turkey) Mustafa Tugra Nur
Men's singles SL4	(France) Lucas Mazur	(Germany) Marcel Adam	(Sweden) Dilan Jacobsson
Men's singles SL4	(France) Lucas Mazur	(Germany) Marcel Adam	(Portugal) Diogo Daniel
Men's singles SU5	(France) Meril Loquette	(Turkey) Ilker Tuzcu	(Wales) David Jack Wilson
Men's singles SU5	(France) Meril Loquette	(Turkey) Ilker Tuzcu	(England) Robert Donald
Men's singles SH6	(France) Charles Noakes	(England) Jack Shephard	(Spain) Ivan Segura
Men's singles SH6	(France) Charles Noakes	(England) Jack Shephard	(France) Maxime Greboval
Men's doubles WH1–WH2	(Italy) Yuri Ferrigno (Switzerland) Luca Olgiati	(France) Thomas Jakobs (France) David Toupé	(Germany) Rick Cornell Hellmann (Spain) Francisco Motero
Men's doubles WH1–WH2	(Italy) Yuri Ferrigno (Switzerland) Luca Olgiati	(France) Thomas Jakobs (France) David Toupé	(Ukraine) Yehor Harmash (Czech Republic) Zbyněk Sýkora
Men's doubles SL3–SL4	(Ukraine) Oleksandr Chyrkov (Sweden) Dilan Jacobsson	(Portugal) Diogo Daniel (France) Mathieu Thomas	(Germany) Marcel Adam (England) Curnow Pirbhai-Clarke
Men's doubles SL3–SL4	(Ukraine) Oleksandr Chyrkov (Sweden) Dilan Jacobsson	(Portugal) Diogo Daniel (France) Mathieu Thomas	(Sweden) Rickard Nilsson (England) William Smith
Men's doubles SU5	(France) Meril Loquette (France) Lucas Mazur	(Azerbaijan) Ibrahim Aliyev (Poland) Bartłomiej Mróz	(Spain) Manuel García (Spain) Pablo Serrano
Men's doubles SU5	(France) Meril Loquette (France) Lucas Mazur	(Azerbaijan) Ibrahim Aliyev (Poland) Bartłomiej Mróz	(Turkey) Burak May (Turkey) Ilker Tuzcu
Men's doubles SH6	(England) Krysten Coombs (France) Charles Noakes	(Serbia) Djordje Koprivica (Germany) Robin Weiler	(Portugal) Goncalo Batista (Scotland) Andrew Davies
Men's doubles SH6	(England) Krysten Coombs (France) Charles Noakes	(Serbia) Djordje Koprivica (Germany) Robin Weiler	(Spain) Ivan Segura (Spain) Manuel Serrano
Women's singles WH1	(Switzerland) Cynthia Mathez	(Belgium) Man-Kei To	(Poland) Natalia Grzyb
Women's singles WH1	(Switzerland) Cynthia Mathez	(Belgium) Man-Kei To	(Poland) Anna Wolny
Women's singles WH2	(Switzerland) Ilaria Olgiati	(Turkey) Emine Seckin	(Germany) Annika Schroder
Women's singles WH2	(Switzerland) Ilaria Olgiati	(Turkey) Emine Seckin	(Turkey) Narin Uluc
Women's singles SL3	(France) Milena Surreau	(Ukraine) Oksana Kozyna	(Turkey) Halime Yildiz
Women's singles SL3	(France) Milena Surreau	(Ukraine) Oksana Kozyna	(France) Coraline Bergeron
Women's singles SL4	(Norway) Helle Sofie Sagoy	(Turkey) Tugce Celik	(Finland) Venla Salo
Women's singles SL4	(Norway) Helle Sofie Sagoy	(Turkey) Tugce Celik	(England) Emma Louise Stoner
Women's singles SU5	(France) Maud Lefort	(Portugal) Beatriz Monteiro	(Italy) Rosa Efomo de Marco
Women's singles SU5	(France) Maud Lefort	(Portugal) Beatriz Monteiro	(Denmark) Cathrine Rosengren
Women's singles SH6	(Poland) Oliwia Szmigiel	(England) Anya Butterworth	(Poland) Daria Bujnicka
Women's singles SH6	(Poland) Oliwia Szmigiel	(England) Anya Butterworth	(France) Pauline Beaufour-Pelle
Women's doubles WH1–WH2	(Switzerland) Cynthia Mathez (Switzerland) Ilaria Olgiati	(Turkey) Ebru Goksen (Turkey) Emine Seckin	(Poland) Magdalena Kozera (Finland) Heidi Manninen
Women's doubles WH1–WH2	(Switzerland) Cynthia Mathez (Switzerland) Ilaria Olgiati	(Turkey) Ebru Goksen (Turkey) Emine Seckin	(Poland) Natalia Grzyb (Poland) Anna Wolny
Women's doubles SL3–SU5	(France) Marjorie Boigeol (Norway) Helle Sofie Sagoy	(Italy) Rosa Efomo de Marco (Bulgaria) Emona Ivanova	(Ukraine) Oksana Kozyna (Ukraine) Ivanna Redka
Women's doubles SL3–SU5	(France) Marjorie Boigeol (Norway) Helle Sofie Sagoy	(Italy) Rosa Efomo de Marco (Bulgaria) Emona Ivanova	(Portugal) Beatriz Monteiro (Sweden) Hillevi Salomonsson
Women's doubles SH6	(Poland) Daria Bujnicka (Poland) Oliwia Szmigiel	(Ukraine) Nina Kozlova (Ukraine) Anastasiia Zavalii	(Turkey) Elif Dokuzluoglu (Turkey) Sudenaz Sanli
Women's doubles SH6	(Poland) Daria Bujnicka (Poland) Oliwia Szmigiel	(Ukraine) Nina Kozlova (Ukraine) Anastasiia Zavalii	(France) Pauline Beaufour-Pelle (France) Amelie Mongenot
Mixed doubles WH1–WH2	(Italy) Yuri Ferrigno (Switzerland) Ilaria Olgiati	(Belgium) Brent van der Kelen (Belgium) Man-Kei To	(England) David Follett (France) Marilou Maurel
Mixed doubles WH1–WH2	(Italy) Yuri Ferrigno (Switzerland) Ilaria Olgiati	(Belgium) Brent van der Kelen (Belgium) Man-Kei To	(Turkey) Avni Kertmen (Turkey) Narin Uluc
Mixed doubles SL3–SU5	(France) Lucas Mazur (Norway) Helle Sofie Sagoy	(France) Meril Loquette (France) Laureen Marchand	(France) Abdoullah Ait Bella (France) Coraline Bergeron
Mixed doubles SL3–SU5	(France) Lucas Mazur (Norway) Helle Sofie Sagoy	(France) Meril Loquette (France) Laureen Marchand	(France) Mathis Clement (France) Marjorie Boigeol
Mixed doubles SH6	(England) Jack Shephard (England) Anya Butterworth	(England) Krysten Coombs (Azerbaijan) Zahra Salmanli	(Scotland) Andrew Davies (Poland) Daria Bujnicka
Mixed doubles SH6	(England) Jack Shephard (England) Anya Butterworth	(England) Krysten Coombs (Azerbaijan) Zahra Salmanli	(Spain) Ivan Segura (Poland) Oliwia Szmigiel

== See also ==
- Badminton at the 2023 European Para Championships
- European Badminton Championships
- European Junior Badminton Championships
