= Marcel Adam =

German para-badminton player

Personal information
- Born: 1 February 1995 (age 31) Hildesheim, Germany

Sport
- Country: Germany
- Sport: Badminton
- Handedness: Right

Men’s singles SL4 Mixed doubles SL3–SU5
- Highest ranking: 3 (MS 19 July 2022); 4 (XD with Katrin Seibert 1 January 2019)
- Current ranking: 11 (MS) (1 October 2022)
- BWF profile
Medal record
Men's para-badminton
Representing Germany
World Championships
Bronze medal – third place	2017 Ulsan	Mixed doubles
European Para Championships
Bronze medal – third place	2023 Rotterdam	Men's singles
European Championships
Silver medal – second place	2016 Beek	Men's doubles
Silver medal – second place	2018 Rodez	Mixed doubles

Marcel Adam (born 1 February 1995) is a German para-badminton player who is affiliated with the MTV Harsum Sports Club. He was a bronze medalist in the mixed doubles SL3–SU5 at the 2017 BWF Para-Badminton World Championships.

Marcel made his Paralympic debut at the 2024 Summer Paralympics, where he competed in the men's singles SL4 event but did not get past the group stages.

== Biography ==
Marcel was born with right-sided hemiparesis. In 2015, he was introduced to para-badminton by Michael Mai, a member of the Lower Saxony Badminton Association, who offered him to train with other para-badminton players in the club.

== Achievements ==
=== World Championships ===
Mixed doubles SL3–SU5

Year	Venue	Partner	Opponent	Score	Result
2017	Dongchun Gymnasium, Ulsan, South Korea	(Germany) Katrin Seibert	(Indonesia) Hary Susanto (Indonesia) Leani Ratri Oktila	5–21, 11–21	Bronze

=== European Para Championships ===
Men's singles SL4

Year	Venue	Opponent	Score	Result
2023	Rotterdam Ahoy, Rotterdam, Netherlands	(Sweden) Rickard Nilsson	20–22, 18–21	Bronze

=== European Championships ===
Men's doubles SL3–SL4

Year	Venue	Partner	Opponent	Score	Result
2016	Sporthal de Haamen, Beek, Netherlands	(Spain) Simón Cruz Mondejar	(France) Lucas Mazur (France) Mathieu Thomas	13–21, 10–21	Silver

Mixed doubles SL3–SU5

Year	Venue	Partner	Opponent	Score	Result
2018	Amphitheatre Gymnasium, Rodez, France	(Germany) Katrin Seibert	(France) Lucas Mazur (France) Faustine Noël	19–21, 10–21	Silver

=== BWF Para Badminton World Circuit (2 titles, 2 runners-up) ===
The BWF Para Badminton World Circuit – Grade 2, Level 1, 2 and 3 tournaments has been sanctioned by the Badminton World Federation from 2022.

Men's singles SL4

Year	Tournament	Level	Opponent	Score	Result
2022	Spanish Para-Badminton International II	Level 2	(India) Sukant Kadam	13–21, 18–21	(silver) Runner-up
2022	Canada Para-Badminton International	Level 1	(Sweden) Rickard Nilsson	21–17, 20–22, 22–20	(gold) Winner
2022	4 Nations Para-Badminton International	Level 1	(France) Lucas Mazur	4–21, 10–21	(silver) Runner-up
2024	Egypt Para-Badminton International	Level 2	(Nigeria) Jeremiah Nnanna	21–19, 13–21, 21–15	(gold) Winner

=== International tournaments (2011–2021) (3 runners-up) ===
Mixed doubles SL3–SU5

Year	Tournament	Partner	Opponent	Score	Result
2017	Spanish Para-Badminton International	(Germany) Katrin Seibert	(Germany) Jan-Niklas Pott (Norway) Helle Sofie Sagøy	17–21, 21–16, 19–21	(silver) Runner-up
2017	Irish Para-Badminton International	(Germany) Katrin Seibert	(Thailand) Siripong Teamarrom (Thailand) Nipada Saensupa	19–21, 12–21	(silver) Runner-up
2018	Spanish Para-Badminton International	(Germany) Katrin Seibert	(Thailand) Siripong Teamarrom (Thailand) Nipada Saensupa	16–21, 11–21	(silver) Runner-up
