= Faustine Noël =

French para badminton player

Personal information
- Born: 25 December 1993 (age 32) Saint-Sébastien-sur-Loire, France
- Height: 160 cm (5 ft 3 in)
- Weight: 60 kg (132 lb)

Sport
- Country: France
- Sport: Badminton
- Coached by: Loris Dufay

Women's singles SL4 Women's doubles SL3–SU5 Mixed doubles SL3–SU5
- Highest ranking: 3 (WS 1 January 2019); 4 (WD with Lénaïg Morin 18 April 2022); 1 (XD with Lucas Mazur 23 August 2022)
- Current ranking: 3 (WS); 6 (WD with Lénaïg Morin); 1 (XD with Lucas Mazur) (8 November 2022)
Medal record
Para-badminton
Representing France
Paralympic Games
Silver medal – second place	2020 Tokyo	Mixed doubles
Bronze medal – third place	2024 Paris	Mixed doubles
World Championships
Silver medal – second place	2015 Stoke Mandeville	Women's singles
Silver medal – second place	2022 Tokyo	Women’s doubles
Bronze medal – third place	2015 Stoke Mandeville	Women's doubles
Bronze medal – third place	2022 Tokyo	Women’s singles
Bronze medal – third place	2022 Tokyo	Mixed doubles
European Championships
Gold medal – first place	2016 Beek	Mixed doubles
Gold medal – first place	2018 Rodez	Mixed doubles
Silver medal – second place	2018 Rodez	Women's singles
Silver medal – second place	2016 Beek	Women's singles
European Para Championships
Gold medal – first place	2023 Rotterdam	Mixed doubles
Bronze medal – third place	2023 Rotterdam	Women's singles

Faustine Noël (born 25 December 1993) is a French para badminton player who competes in international level events.

== Achievements ==
=== Paralympic Games ===
Mixed doubles

Year	Venue	Partner	Opponent	Score	Result
2020	Yoyogi National Gymnasium, Tokyo, Japan	(France) Lucas Mazur	(Indonesia) Hary Susanto (Indonesia) Leani Ratri Oktila	21–23, 17–21	Silver

=== World Championships ===
Women's singles

Year	Venue	Opponent	Score	Result
2015	Stoke Mandeville Stadium, Stoke Mandeville, England	(Norway) Helle Sofie Sagøy	17–21, 18–21	Silver
2022	Yoyogi National Gymnasium, Tokyo, Japan	(Norway) Helle Sofie Sagøy	7–21, 17–21	Bronze

Women's doubles

Year	Venue	Partner	Opponent	Score	Result
2015 (Note: This tournament uses a round robin system.)	Stoke Mandeville Stadium, Stoke Mandeville, England	(France) Véronique Braud	(Norway) Helle Sofie Sagøy (Germany) Katrin Seibert	11–21, 11–21	Bronze
2015	Stoke Mandeville Stadium, Stoke Mandeville, England	(France) Véronique Braud	(India) Parul Parmar (Denmark) Julie Thrane	9–21, 11–21	Bronze
2015	Stoke Mandeville Stadium, Stoke Mandeville, England	(France) Véronique Braud	(India) Siri Chandanna Chillari (India) Manasi Girishchandra Joshi	21–7, 21–9	Bronze
2015	Stoke Mandeville Stadium, Stoke Mandeville, England	(France) Véronique Braud	(Thailand) Wandee Kantam (Japan) Mamiko Toyoda	6–21, 14–21	Bronze
2022	Yoyogi National Gymnasium, Tokyo, Japan	(France) Lénaïg Morin	(Indonesia) Leani Ratri Oktila (Indonesia) Khalimatus Sadiyah	14–21, 21–16, 13–21	Silver

Mixed doubles

Year	Venue	Partner	Opponent	Score	Result
2022	Yoyogi National Gymnasium, Tokyo, Japan	(France) Lucas Mazur	(Thailand) Siripong Teamarrom (Thailand) Nipada Saensupa	19–21, 19–21	Bronze

=== European Championships ===
Women's singles

Year	Venue	Opponent	Score	Result
2016 (Note: This tournament uses a round robin system.)	Sporthal de Haamen, Beek, Netherlands	(France) Véronique Braud	21–14, 21–5	Silver
2016	Sporthal de Haamen, Beek, Netherlands	(Russia) Natalia Iaremchuk	21–6, 21–6	Silver
2016	Sporthal de Haamen, Beek, Netherlands	(Poland) Katarzyna Ziębik	21–10, 21–2	Silver
2016	Sporthal de Haamen, Beek, Netherlands	(Germany) Katrin Seibert	16–21, 17–21	Silver
2018 (Note: This tournament uses a round robin system.)	Amphitheatre Gymnasium, Rodez, France	(France) Véronique Braud	21–10, 21–16	Silver
2018	Amphitheatre Gymnasium, Rodez, France	(Germany) Katrin Seibert	21–17, 18–21, 21–13	Silver
2018	Amphitheatre Gymnasium, Rodez, France	(England) Emma Louise Stoner	21–9, 21–6	Silver
2018	Amphitheatre Gymnasium, Rodez, France	(Norway) Helle Sofie Sagøy	13–21, 20–22	Silver

Mixed doubles

Year	Venue	Partner	Opponent	Score	Result
2016	Sporthal de Haamen, Beek, Netherlands	(France) Lucas Mazur	(France) Geoffrey Byzery (Denmark) Cathrine Rosengren	21–7, 21–14	Gold
2018	Amphitheatre Gymnasium, Rodez, France	(France) Lucas Mazur	(Germany) Marcel Adam (Germany) Katrin Seibert	21–19, 21–10	Gold

=== BWF Para Badminton World Circuit (1 runner-up) ===
The BWF Para Badminton World Circuit – Grade 2, Level 1, 2 and 3 tournaments has been sanctioned by the Badminton World Federation from 2022.

Women's singles

Year	Tournament	Level	Opponent	Score	Result
2023	Brazil Para-Badminton International	Level 2	(Indonesia) Leani Ratri Oktila	16–21, 11–21	(silver) Runner-up
