= Emine Seçkin =

Turkish para-badminton player (born 1980)

Personal information
- Born: 20 March 1980 (age 46) Aksaray, Turkey
- Height: 1.58 m (5 ft 2 in)
- Weight: 54 kg (119 lb)

Sport
- Country: Turkey
- Sport: Para badminton
- Disability class: WH2
- Club: Torku Şekerspor, Konya
- Coached by: Mehmet Fatih Yüksel
Medal record
Women's Para badminton
Representing Turkey
World Championships
Silver medal – second place	2022 Tokyo	Singles WH2
Silver medal – second place	2022 Tokyo	Doubles WH1–WH2
Bronze medal – third place	2015 Stoke Mandeville	Singles WH2
Silver medal – second place	2013 Dortmund	Singles WH2
Silver medal – second place	2013 Dortmund	Doubles WH2
Bronze medal – third place	2011 Guatemala City	Singles WH2
European Para Championships
Gold medal – first place	2023 Rotterdam	Singles WH2
Bronze medal – third place	2023 Rotterdam	Doubles WH1-WH2
European Championships
Gold medal – first place	2018 Rodez	Singles WH2
Silver medal – second place	2018 Rodez	Ddoubles WH1-WH2
Silver medal – second place	2018 Rodez	Mixed doubles WH1-WH2
Gold medal – first place	2016 Beek	Singles WH2
Gold medal – first place	2016 Beek	Doubles WH1-WH2
Tournaments
Silver medal – second place	2024 Glasgow	Singles WH2
Gold medal – first place	2023 Ottawa	Singles WH2
Gold medal – first place	2023 Ottawa	Mixed team
Silver medal – second place	2021 Dubai	Singles WH2
Gold medal – first place	2021 Dubai	Doubles

Emine Seçkin (born 20 March 1980) is a Turkish European-champion para-badminton player who competes in the disability class WH2 at international competitions, in singles and doubles events. She competed at the 2020 Paralympics, and was qualified for the 2024 Paralympics.

== Sport career ==
Seçkin started playing para badminton inspired by her wheelchair basketball player spouse in 2010. In the beginning, she had difficult times, and did not get success. However, she did not give up, and continued with the sport.

She is 1.58 m (5 ft 2 in) tall at 54 kg (119 lb). She competes in the wheelchair disability class WH2. She transferred to Torku Şekerspor in Konya from Konyaspor. She is coached by Mehmet Fatih Yüksel.

She won the silver medal in the singles WH2 and the gold medal in the doubles event at the 2021 Fazza Para Badminton International tournament in Dubai, United Arab Emirates.

During the 2020 Summer Paralympics in Tokyo, Japan, she learned of the death of her father. She narrowly lost to rival Yuma Yamazaki in the bronze medal match, and ranked fourth.

At the Bahrain Para Badminton International 2022, she took the bronze medal. The same year, she won silver medals in the singles WH2 and the doubles WH1–WH2 events at the BWF Para-Badminton World Championships in Tokyo.

In 2023, she captured the gold medals in the singles WH2 and Mixed tram events at the Canada Para Badminton International Tournament in Ottawa. At the 2023 European Para Championships in Rotterdam, Netherlands, she won the gold medal.

She received a quota to represent her country at the 2024 Paralympics in Paris, France.

At the 4 Nations Para Badminton International 2024 tournament in Glasgow, Scotland, she took the silver medal in the Singles WH2 event.

== Personal life ==
Emine Seçkin was born in Aksaray, Turkey, on 20 March 1980. She is married to Murat Seçkin, a wheelchair basketball player, and is mother of two children.
