= Milena Surreau =

French para-badminton player (born 1997)

Sport
- Sport: Para badminton / Para snowboard
- Disability: Spastique Tetraplegia
- Disability class: SL3 / SB-LL1
Medal record
Representing France
European Para Championships
Silver medal – second place	2023 Rotterdam	Singles SL4
European Championships
Gold medal – first place	2025 Istanbul	Singles SL3

Milena Surreau (born 12 May 1997) is a French para-badminton player who competes in international badminton competitions, she is a European champion and has competed at the 2024 Summer Paralympics.

Surreau has a rare neurological disease called Hereditary Spastic Paraplegia that causes muscle weakness in her legs, arms, and spasticity. She also has autism.

In 2025, she began a career in para snowboard by competing on the French Cup circuit, where she won the overall ranking after three victories in Giant Slalom. She then qualified for the French Championships, where she earned two national titles in Giant Slalom and Boarder Cross.

Surreau is also a self-taught musician who plays the drums, saxophone and guitar. She is also author and composer. She used to work in Guérande as a salt worker before having to stop because of her disability.

She is now the producer and host of Journal d’une parabadiste, the number one podcast in France about Paralympic sport.
