= Julie Thrane =

Danish para badminton player (born 1995)

Personal information
- Born: 1995 (age 30–31) Aalborg, Denmark

Sport
- Sport: Para-badminton
Medal record
Representing Denmark
World Championships
Gold medal – first place	2015 Stoke Mandeville	Singles SU5
Silver medal – second place	2015 Stoke Mandeville	Doubles SU5
Bronze medal – third place	2013 Dortmund	Singles SU5
Bronze medal – third place	2015 Stoke Mandeville	Mixed doubles SL3-SU5
European Championships
Silver medal – second place	2014 Murcia	Singles SU5
Silver medal – second place	2014 Murcia	Mixed doubles SL3-SU5
Bronze medal – third place	2012 Dortmund	Mixed doubles SU5
Bronze medal – third place	2016 Beek	Singles SU5

Julie Thrane (born 1995) is a Danish para-badminton player who competes in international badminton competitions. She is a World champion and double European silver medalist in singles competitions.
