= Karin Suter-Erath =

Swiss para badminton player and former wheelchair tennis player

Karin Suter Erath
Personal information
- Born: 24 November 1970 (age 55) Basel, Switzerland

Sport
- Country: Switzerland
- Sport: Para badminton
- Disability class: WH1
Medal record
Wheelchair tennis
Representing Switzerland
Paralympic Games
Bronze medal – third place	2004 Athens	Women's doubles
Para badminton
Representing Switzerland
World Championships
Gold medal – first place	2011 Guatemala City	Women's doubles
Gold medal – first place	2013 Dortmund	Women's singles
Silver medal – second place	2011 Guatemala City	Women's singles
Silver medal – second place	2013 Dortmund	Women's doubles
Bronze medal – third place	2011 Guatemala City	Mixed doubles
Bronze medal – third place	2013 Dortmund	Mixed doubles
Bronze medal – third place	2015 Stoke Mandeville	Women's singles
Bronze medal – third place	2019 Basel	Women's singles
European Championships
Gold medal – first place	2012 Dortmund	Women's singles
Gold medal – first place	2012 Dortmund	Mixed doubles
Gold medal – first place	2014 Murcia	Women's singles
Gold medal – first place	2014 Murcia	Women's doubles
Gold medal – first place	2014 Murcia	Mixed doubles
Gold medal – first place	2016 Beek	Women's singles
Gold medal – first place	2016 Beek	Women's doubles
Gold medal – first place	2016 Beek	Mixed doubles
Gold medal – first place	2016 Rodez	Women's doubles
Silver medal – second place	2010 Manchester	Women's singles
Silver medal – second place	2012 Dortmund	Women's doubles
Silver medal – second place	2018 Rodez	Women's singles

Karin Suter-Erath (born 24 November 1970) is a Swiss para badminton player and a former wheelchair tennis player.

Suter-Erath was a very keen handball and soccer player when aged 13 and played in European handball leagues from the ages of 17 to 27. She studied physical education at university and became a secondary school teacher once she graduated.

In 1997, Suter-Erath was paralysed from the waist down in an accident which caused her to stop playing handball. While in rehab in Nottwil, she tried out wheelchair tennis and when she completed her rehab then she took the sport up professionally. In 2004, Suter-Erath teamed up with Sandra Kalt and competed in the 2004 Summer Paralympics and won their first ever Paralympic medal in the women's doubles. From 2005 to 2007, she reached to world number six and was voted as Basel's Athlete of the Year alongside Roger Federer and FC Basel a year later.

As well as being very successful in wheelchair tennis, she took up para badminton and won a silver medal in the women's doubles at the 2010 Para Badminton European Championships in Manchester then won eight medals in the BWF Para-Badminton World Championships and twelve medals in the European championships.

== Wheelchair tennis statistics ==
Karin Suter-Erath
- Country (sports): Switzerland

Singles
- Career record: 227-132
- Highest ranking: No. 6 (13 February 2006)

Other tournaments
- Paralympic Games: 1R (2004)

Doubles
- Career record: 172-92
- Highest ranking: No. 6 (17 November 2003)

Other doubles tournaments
- Paralympic Games: (2004)

=== Paralympic Games ===
Outcome	Year	Tournament	Surface	Partner	Opponent	Score
Bronze	2004	Summer Paralympics	Hard	(Switzerland) Sandra Kalt	(Japan) Chiyoko Ohmae (Japan) Mie Yaosa	7–5, 6–3

== Para-badminton statistics ==
=== World Championships ===
Women's singles
Year	Venue	Opponent	Score	Result
2011	Guatemala City, Guatemala	(South Korea) Son Ok-cha	19–21, 14–21	Silver
2013	Helmut-Körnig-Halle; Dortmund, Germany	(South Korea) Son Ok-cha	21–16, 15–21, 21–11	Gold
2015	Stoke Mandeville Stadium, Stoke Mandeville, England	(China) Wang Ping	10–21, 19–21	Bronze
2019	St. Jakobshalle; Basel, Switzerland	(Japan) Sarina Satomi	14–21, 13–21	Bronze

Women's doubles
Year	Venue	Partner	Opponent	Score	Result
2011	Guatemala City, Guatemala	(Switzerland) Sonja Haesler	Round Robin		Gold
2013	Helmut-Körnig-Halle; Dortmund, Germany	(Thailand) Sujirat Pookkham	(South Korea) Lee Sun-ae (South Korea) Son Ok-cha	11–21, 21–19, 19–21	Silver

Mixed doubles
Year	Venue	Partner	Opponent	Score	Result
2011	Guatemala City, Guatemala	(Turkey) Avni Kertmen	(France) David Toupe (Switzerland) Sonja Haesler	13–21, 14–21	Bronze
2013	Helmut-Körnig-Halle; Dortmund, Germany	(Germany) Thomas Wandschneider	(South Korea) Lee Sam-seop (South Korea) Son Ok-cha	19–21, 21–23	Bronze
