= Elke Rongen =

German para badminton player

Personal information
- Born: 6 July 1970 (age 55) Heinsberg, West Germany

Sport
- Sport: Para-badminton
Medal record
Representing Germany
World Championships
Silver medal – second place	2007 Bangkok	Women's doubles BMW2
Bronze medal – third place	2007 Bangkok	Women's singles BMW2
Bronze medal – third place	2007 Bangkok	Mixed doubles BMW2
Bronze medal – third place	2013 Dortmund	Women's singles WH1
Bronze medal – third place	2013 Dortmund	Women's doubles WH1
European Championships
Gold medal – first place	2006 La Rinconada	Women's singles BMW2
Silver medal – second place	2006 La Rinconada	Mixed doubles BMW2
Silver medal – second place	2014 Murcia	Women's doubles WH1-WH2
Silver medal – second place	2016 Beek	Women's doubles WH1-WH2
Bronze medal – third place	2012 Dortmund	Women's singles WH1
Bronze medal – third place	2012 Dortmund	Women's doubles WH1-WH2
Bronze medal – third place	2014 Murcia	Mixed doubles WH1-WH2
Bronze medal – third place	2018 Rodez	Women's doubles WH1-WH2

Elke Rongen (born 6 July 1970) is a German para-badminton player who competes in international badminton competitions. She is a three-time German, European champion and a World silver medalist. She competed at the 2020 Summer Paralympics but did not medal.
