= Cathrine Rosengren =

Danish para-badminton player

Personal information
- Born: 1 February 1999 (age 27) Taastrup, Denmark

Sport
- Sport: Para-badminton
- Disability: Nerve damage in left arm
- Disability class: SU5
Medal record
Representing Denmark
World Championships
| Bronze medal – third place | 2017 Ulsan | Singles SU5 |
| Bronze medal – third place | 2019 Basel | Singles SU5 |
| Bronze medal – third place | 2022 Tokyo | Singles SU5 |
| Bronze medal – third place | 2024 Pattaya | Singles SU5 |
European Championships
| Gold medal – first place | 2016 Beek | Singles SU5 |
| Gold medal – first place | 2018 Rodez | Singles SU5 |
| Silver medal – second place | 2016 Beek | Mixed doubles SL3-SU5 |
| Silver medal – second place | 2018 Rodez | Mixed doubles SL3-SU5 |
European Para Championships
| Silver medal – second place | 2023 Rotterdam | Singles SU5 |

Cathrine Rosengren (born 1 February 1999) is a Danish para-badminton player who competes in international badminton competitions. She is a four-time World bronze medalist and two-time European champion in singles' competitions.

She has competed at the 2020 and 2024 Summer Paralympics. She lost in the women's singles SU5 semifinals to eventual gold medalist Yang Qiuxia.
