= Badminton at the 2026 Asian Para Games – Mixed doubles SH6 =

Mixed doubles SH6 at the 2026 Asian Para Games
- Venue: Ichinomiya City Municipal Gymnasium, Ichinomiya
- Dates: 16 – 23 October 2026
- Competitors: 16 from 4 nations

Medalists
gold medal	Subhan; Rina Marlina	Indonesia
silver medal	Zeng Qingtao; Lin Shuangbao	China
bronze medal	Lin Naili; Li Fengmei	China
bronze medal	Krishna Nagar; Nithya Sre Sivan	India

The mixed doubles SH6 event at the 2026 Asian Para Games was played from 16 to 23 October 2026 in Ichinomiya City Municipal Gymnasium, Ichinomiya. A total of 16 players competed in 8 pairs.

Subhan and Rina Marlina, the defending champions, successfully retained their title by defeating Zeng Qingtao and Lin Shuangbao in the final. Lin Naili and Li Fengmei, alongside Krishna Nagar and Nithya Sre Sivan won the bronze medals respectively.

== Schedule ==
GS	Group stage	½	Semifinals	F	Final

Fri 16	Sat 17	Sun 18	Mon 19	Tue 20	Wed 21	Thu 22	Fri 23
GS	GS	—N/a		GS	—N/a	½	F

== Seeds ==
The following players were seeded:

1. Krishna Nagar / Nithya Sre Sivan (IND) (bronze medallist)
2. Subhan / Rina Marlina (INA) (gold medallist)

== Group Stage ==
=== Group A ===
Pos	Team	Pld	W	L	GF	GA	GD	PF	PA	PD	Qualification
1	Lin Naili (CHN) Li Fengmei (CHN)	3	3	0	6	0	+6	126	39	+87	Semi-finals
2	Krishna Nagar (IND) Nithya Sre Sivan (IND) [1]	3	2	1	4	2	+2	100	81	+19	Semi-finals
3	Muhammad Amin Azmi (MAS) Nurzammiezatul Mohamad (MAS)	3	1	2	2	4	−2	69	106	−37	
4	Lin Jia-siang (TPE) Wu Yu-yen (TPE)	3	0	3	0	6	−6	57	126	−69	

Source: Asian Para Games

Date	Player 1	Score	Player 2	Game 1	Game 2	Game 3	Report
16 Oct	Krishna Nagar (India); Nithya Sre Sivan (India)	2–0	(Malaysia) Muhammad Amin Azmi (Malaysia) Nurzammiezatul Mohamad	21–7	21–7		Report
16 Oct	Lin Naili (China); Li Fengmei (China)	2–0	(Chinese Taipei) Lin Jia-siang (Chinese Taipei) Wu Yu-yen	21–6	21–4		Report
17 Oct	Krishna Nagar (India); Nithya Sre Sivan (India)	0–2	(China) Lin Naili (China) Li Fengmei	6–21	10–21		Report
17 Oct	Lin Jia-siang (Chinese Taipei); Wu Yu-yen (Chinese Taipei)	0–2	(Malaysia) Muhammad Amin Azmi (Malaysia) Nurzammiezatul Mohamad	9–21	13–21		Report
19 Oct	Krishna Nagar (India); Nithya Sre Sivan (India)	2–0	(Chinese Taipei) Lin Jia-siang (Chinese Taipei) Wu Yu-yen	21–15	21–10		Report
19 Oct	Lin Naili (China); Li Fengmei (China)	2–0	(Malaysia) Muhammad Amin Azmi (Malaysia) Nurzammiezatul Mohamad	21–4	21–9		Report

=== Group B ===
Pos	Team	Pld	W	L	GF	GA	GD	PF	PA	PD	Qualification
1	Subhan (INA) Rina Marlina (INA) [2]	3	3	0	6	1	+5	144	111	+33	Semi-finals
2	Zeng Qingtao (CHN) Lin Shuangbao (CHN)	3	2	1	4	2	+2	112	84	+28	Semi-finals
3	Natthapong Meechai (THA) Chai Saeyang (THA)	3	1	2	3	4	−1	123	130	−7	
4	Chu Man Kai (HKG) Choi Wing Kei (HKG)	3	0	3	0	6	−6	72	126	−54	

Source: Asian Para Games

Date	Player 1	Score	Player 2	Game 1	Game 2	Game 3	Report
16 Oct	Subhan (Indonesia); Rina Marlina (Indonesia)	2–1	(Thailand) Natthapong Meechai (Thailand) Chai Saeyang	21–15	18–21	21–19	Report
16 Oct	Chu Man Kai (Hong Kong); Choi Wing Kei	0–2	(China) Zeng Qingtao (China) Lin Shuangbao	9–21	7–21		Report
17 Oct	Subhan (Indonesia); Rina Marlina (Indonesia)	2–0	Chu Man Kai (Hong Kong); Choi Wing Kei	21–15	21–13		Report
17 Oct	Zeng Qingtao (China); Lin Shuangbao (China)	2–0	(Thailand) Natthapong Meechai (Thailand) Chai Saeyang	21–15	21–11		Report
19 Oct	Subhan (Indonesia); Rina Marlina (Indonesia)	2–0	(China) Zeng Qingtao (China) Lin Shuangbao	21–10	21–18		Report
19 Oct	Chu Man Kai (Hong Kong); Choi Wing Kei (Hong Kong)	0–2	(Thailand) Natthapong Meechai (Thailand) Chai Saeyang	13–21	15–21		Report

== Knockout stage ==
Semi-finals
Lin Naili (CHN); Li Fengmei (CHN)	11	19
Zeng Qingtao (CHN); Lin Shuangbao (CHN)	21	21
1	Krishna Nagar (IND); Nithya Sre Sivan (IND)	14	18
2	Subhan (INA); Rina Marlina (INA)	21	21

Final
Zeng Qingtao (CHN); Lin Shuangbao (CHN)	16	21	15
2	Subhan (INA); Rina Marlina (INA)	21	11	21
