= Badminton at the 2024 Summer Paralympics – Men's singles SH6 =

Badminton competition

Men's singles SH6 at the XVII Paralympic Games
- Venue: Arena Porte de La Chapelle, Paris
- Dates: 29 August 2024 – 2 September 2024
- Competitors: 11 from 9 nations

Medalists
1st place, gold medalist(s)		Charles Noakes	France
2nd place, silver medalist(s)		Krysten Coombs	Great Britain
3rd place, bronze medalist(s)		Vitor Tavares	Brazil

The men's singles SH6 tournament at the 2024 Summer Paralympics in France took place between 29 August and 2 September 2024 at Arena Porte de La Chapelle. 11 players entered the event. The event was won by unseeded home player Charles Noakes, who defeated the 2020 bronze medalist, Krysten Coombs in the final.

== Classification ==
- SH6
  Players in this class have short stature caused by achondroplasia or other genetic conditions.

== Seeds ==
These were the seeds for this event:

1. Chu Man Kai (HKG) (semifinals)
2. Vitor Tavares (BRA) (semifinals, bronze medalist)
3. Krishna Nagar (IND) (group stage)

== Group stage ==
The draw of the group stage was revealed on 24 August 2024. The group stage was played from 29 to 31 August. The top two winners of each group advanced to the knockout rounds.

=== Group A ===
Pos	Team	Pld	W	L	GF	GA	GD	PF	PA	PD	Pts	Qualification
1	Chu Man Kai (HKG)	3	3	0	6	2	+4	163	124	+39	3	Semi-finals
2	Krysten Coombs (GBR)	3	2	1	5	3	+2	150	137	+13	2	Quarter-finals
3	Subhan (INA)	3	1	2	3	4	−1	122	133	−11	1	
4	Sivarajan Solaimalai (IND)	3	0	3	1	6	−5	103	144	−41	0	

First match(es) will be played: 29 August 2024. Source: COJOP2024

Date	Time	Player 1	Score	Player 2	Set 1	Set 2	Set 3	Report
Aug 29	16:46	Subhan (Indonesia)	2–0	(India) Sivarajan Solaimalai	21–15	21–17		Report
Aug 29	18:35	Chu Man Kai (Hong Kong)	2–1	(United Kingdom) Krysten Coombs	21–13	19–21	21-15	Report
Aug 30	17:17	Subhan (Indonesia)	1–2	(United Kingdom) Krysten Coombs	15–21	21–17	18–21	Report
Aug 30	18:21	Chu Man Kai (Hong Kong)	2–1	(India) Sivarajan Solaimalai	21–13	18–21	21–15	Report
Aug 31	17:29	Chu Man Kai (Hong Kong)	2–0	(Indonesia) Subhan	21-13	21-13		Report
Aug 31	18:34	Sivarajan Solaimalai (India)	0–2	(United Kingdom) Krysten Coombs	12-21	10-21		Report

=== Group B ===
Pos	Team	Pld	W	L	GF	GA	GD	PF	PA	PD	Pts	Qualification
1	Nattapong Meechai (THA)	2	2	0	4	0	+4	76	56	+20	2	Quarter-finals
2	Miles Krajewski (USA)	2	1	1	2	2	0	75	77	−2	1	Quarter-finals
3	Krishna Nagar (IND)	2	0	2	0	4	−4	57	75	−18	0	

First match(es) will be played: 29 August 2024. Source: COJOP2024

Date	Time	Player 1	Score	Player 2	Set 1	Set 2	Set 3	Report
Aug 29	17:52	Miles Krajewski (United States)	0–2	(Thailand) Nattapong Meechai	13–21	20–22		Report
Aug 30	22:14	Krishna Nagar (India)	0–2	(United States) Miles Krajewski	16–21	18–21		Report
Aug 31	20:41	Krishna Nagar (India)	0–2	(Thailand) Nattapong Meechai	20–22	3–11 RET		Report

=== Group C ===
Pos	Team	Pld	W	L	GF	GA	GD	PF	PA	PD	Pts	Qualification
1	Charles Noakes (FRA)	3	3	0	6	0	+6	126	101	+25	3	Semi-finals
2	Vitor Tavares (BRA)	3	1	2	3	4	−1	136	129	+7	1	Quarter-finals
3	Lin Naili (CHN)	3	1	2	2	4	−2	104	115	−11	1	
4	Jack Shephard (GBR)	3	1	2	2	5	−3	122	143	−21	1	

First match(es) will be played: 29 August 2024. Source: COJOP2024

Date	Time	Player 1	Score	Player 2	Set 1	Set 2	Set 3	Report
Aug 29	17:02	Lin Naili (China)	2–0	(United Kingdom) Jack Shephard	21–17	21–14		Report
Aug 29	17:45	Vitor Tavares (Brazil)	0–2	(France) Charles Noakes	19–21	16–21		Report
Aug 30	19:27	Vitor Tavares (Brazil)	1–2	(United Kingdom) Jack Shephard	19–21	21–15	19–21	Report
Aug 30	21:22	Lin Naili (China)	0–2	(France) Charles Noakes	15–21	17–21		Report
Aug 31	18:43	Vitor Tavares (Brazil)	2–0	(China) Lin Naili	21–15	21–15		Report
Aug 31	19:12	Jack Shephard (United Kingdom)	0–2	(France) Charles Noakes	17–21	17–21		Report

== Finals ==
The knockout stage was played from 1 to 2 September.

Quarter-finals
B1	Nattapong Meechai (THA)	15	21	11
A2	Krysten Coombs (GBR)	21	18	21
C2	Vitor Tavares (BRA)	21	10	23
B2	Miles Krajewski (USA)	12	21	21

Semi-finals
A1	Chu Man Kai (HKG)	19	14	-
A2	Krysten Coombs (GBR)	21	21	-
C2	Vitor Tavares (BRA)	18	20	-
C1	Charles Noakes (FRA)	21	22	-

Gold medal match
A2	Krysten Coombs (GBR) (silver)	19	13	-
C1	Charles Noakes (FRA) (gold)	21	21	-
Bronze medal match
A1	Chu Man Kai (HKG)	21	21	12
C2	Vitor Tavares (BRA) (bronze)	23	16	21
