= Badminton at the 2022 Asian Para Games – Men's singles SH6 =

Badminton tournament

Badminton's men's singles SH6 at the 2022 Asian Para Games
- Venue: Binjiang Gymnasium, Hangzhou
- Dates: 20 – 27 August 2023
- Competitors: 16 from 10 nations

Medalists
| gold medal | Chu Man Kai | Hong Kong |
| silver medal | Krishna Nagar | India |
| bronze medal | Wong Chun Yim | Hong Kong |
| bronze medal | Lin Naili | China |

The men's singles SH6 badminton tournament at the 2022 Asian Para Games is playing from 20 to 27 October 2023 in Binjiang Gymnasium, Hangzhou. A total of 16 players competed at the tournament, four of whom was seeded.

== Competition schedule ==
Plays are taking place between 20 and 27 October 2023.

| GS | Group stage | ¼ | Quarterfinals | ½ | Semifinals | F | Final |

| Events | Fri 20 | Sat 21 | Sun 22 | Mon 23 | Tue 24 | Wed 25 | Thu 26 | Fri 27 |
|---|---|---|---|---|---|---|---|---|
| Men's singles SH6 | GS | GS | | | GS | ¼ | ½ | F |

== Seeds ==
The following players were seeded:

1. Chu Man Kai (HKG) (champion; gold medalist)
2. Krishna Nagar (IND) (final; silver medalist)
3. Wong Chun Yim (HKG) (semi-finals; bronze medalist)
4. Yohei Hatakeyama (JPN) (quarter-finals)

== Group stage ==
=== Group A ===
| Pos | Team | Pld | W | L | GF | GA | GD | PF | PA | PD | Qualification |
|---|---|---|---|---|---|---|---|---|---|---|---|
| 1 | Chu Man Kai (HKG) [1] | 3 | 3 | 0 | 6 | 0 | +6 | 126 | 51 | +75 | Qualification to elimination stage |
| 2 | Lin Naili (CHN) (H) | 3 | 2 | 1 | 4 | 2 | +2 | 114 | 70 | +44 | Qualification to elimination stage |
| 3 | Bunthan Yaemmali (THA) | 3 | 1 | 2 | 2 | 4 | −2 | 65 | 111 | −46 | |
| 4 | Chen Yi-yang (TPE) | 3 | 0 | 3 | 0 | 6 | −6 | 53 | 126 | −73 | |

Source: Group A – standings
(H) Host

| Date | | Score | | Game 1 | Game 2 | Game 3 |
|---|---|---|---|---|---|---|
| 20 Oct | Chu Man Kai (Hong Kong) | 2–0 | (China) Lin Naili | 21–12 | 21–18 | |
| 20 Oct | Bunthan Yaemmali (Thailand) | 2–0 | (Chinese Taipei) Chen Yi-yang | 21–11 | 21–16 | |
| 21 Oct | Chu Man Kai (Hong Kong) | 2–0 | (Thailand) Bunthan Yaemmali | 21–6 | 21–7 | |
| 21 Oct | Chen Yi-yang (Chinese Taipei) | 0–2 | (China) Lin Naili | 9–21 | 9–21 | |
| 24 Oct | Chu Man Kai (Hong Kong) | 2–0 | (Chinese Taipei) Chen Yi-yang | 21–2 | 21–6 | |
| 24 Oct | Bunthan Yaemmali (Thailand) | 0–2 | (China) Lin Naili | 5–21 | 5–21 | |

=== Group B ===
| Pos | Team | Pld | W | L | GF | GA | GD | PF | PA | PD | Qualification |
|---|---|---|---|---|---|---|---|---|---|---|---|
| 1 | Krishna Nagar (IND) [2] | 3 | 3 | 0 | 6 | 2 | +4 | 168 | 114 | +54 | Qualification to elimination stage |
| 2 | Zeng Qingtao (CHN) (H) | 3 | 2 | 1 | 5 | 3 | +2 | 147 | 140 | +7 | Qualification to elimination stage |
| 3 | Nattapong Meechai (THA) | 3 | 1 | 2 | 4 | 4 | 0 | 156 | 131 | +25 | |
| 4 | Rida Rizk (LBN) | 3 | 0 | 3 | 0 | 6 | −6 | 40 | 126 | −86 | |

Source: Group B – standings
(H) Host

| Date | | Score | | Game 1 | Game 2 | Game 3 |
|---|---|---|---|---|---|---|
| 20 Oct | Krishna Nagar (India) | 2–1 | (Thailand) Nattapong Meechai | 21–15 | 21–23 | 21–14 |
| 20 Oct | Zeng Qingtao (China) | 2–0 | (Lebanon) Rida Rizk | 21–7 | 21–8 | |
| 21 Oct | Krishna Nagar (India) | 2–1 | (China) Zeng Qingtao | 21–23 | 21–13 | 21–12 |
| 21 Oct | Rida Rizk (Lebanon) | 0–2 | (Thailand) Nattapong Meechai | 5–21 | 6–21 | |
| 24 Oct | Krishna Nagar (India) | 2–0 | (Lebanon) Rida Rizk | 21–7 | 21–7 | |
| 24 Oct | Zeng Qingtao (China) | 2–1 | (Thailand) Nattapong Meechai | 21–18 | 11–21 | 25–23 |

=== Group C ===
| Pos | Team | Pld | W | L | GF | GA | GD | PF | PA | PD | Qualification |
|---|---|---|---|---|---|---|---|---|---|---|---|
| 1 | Wong Chun Yim (HKG) [3/4] | 3 | 3 | 0 | 6 | 0 | +6 | 126 | 53 | +73 | Qualification to elimination stage |
| 2 | Lee Dae-sung (KOR) | 3 | 2 | 1 | 4 | 2 | +2 | 113 | 83 | +30 | Qualification to elimination stage |
| 3 | Dimas Tri Aji (INA) | 3 | 1 | 2 | 2 | 4 | −2 | 83 | 104 | −21 | |
| 4 | Vadakkayil Areeparamb (IND) | 3 | 0 | 3 | 0 | 6 | −6 | 44 | 126 | −82 | |

Source: Group C – standings

| Date | | Score | | Game 1 | Game 2 | Game 3 |
|---|---|---|---|---|---|---|
| 20 Oct | Wong Chun Yim (Hong Kong) | 2–0 | (South Korea) Lee Dae-sung | 21–16 | 21–13 | |
| 20 Oct | Dimas Tri Aji (Indonesia) | 2–0 | (India) Vadakkayil Areeparamb | 21–11 | 21–9 | |
| 21 Oct | Wong Chun Yim (Hong Kong) | 2–0 | (Indonesia) Dimas Tri Aji | 21–7 | 21–8 | |
| 21 Oct | Vadakkayil Areeparamb (India) | 0–2 | (South Korea) Lee Dae-sung | 8–21 | 7–21 | |
| 24 Oct | Wong Chun Yim (Hong Kong) | 2–0 | (India) Vadakkayil Areeparamb | 21–7 | 21–2 | |
| 24 Oct | Dimas Tri Aji (Indonesia) | 0–2 | (South Korea) Lee Dae-sung | 12–21 | 14–21 | |

=== Group D ===
| Pos | Team | Pld | W | L | GF | GA | GD | PF | PA | PD | Qualification |
|---|---|---|---|---|---|---|---|---|---|---|---|
| 1 | Yohei Hatakemyama (JPN) [3/4] | 3 | 3 | 0 | 6 | 1 | +5 | 142 | 85 | +57 | Qualification to elimination stage |
| 2 | Subhan (INA) | 3 | 2 | 1 | 5 | 2 | +3 | 143 | 69 | +74 | Qualification to elimination stage |
| 3 | Madhavan Akash Sethu (IND) | 3 | 1 | 2 | 2 | 4 | −2 | 70 | 113 | −43 | |
| 4 | Eyamin Hossain (BAN) | 3 | 0 | 3 | 0 | 6 | −6 | 40 | 128 | −88 | |

Source: Group D – standings

| Date | | Score | | Game 1 | Game 2 | Game 3 |
|---|---|---|---|---|---|---|
| 20 Oct | Yohei Hatakemyama (Japan) | 2–1 | (Indonesia) Subhan | 14–21 | 21–17 | 23–21 |
| 20 Oct | Madhavan Akash Sethu (India) | 2–0 | (Bangladesh) Eyamin Hossain | 23–21 | 21–8 | |
| 21 Oct | Yohei Hatakemyama (Japan) | 2–0 | (India) Madhavan Akash Sethu | 21–10 | 21–9 | |
| 21 Oct | Eyamin Hossain (Bangladesh) | 0–2 | (Indonesia) Subhan | 3–21 | 1–21 | |
| 24 Oct | Yohei Hatakemyama (Japan) | 2–0 | (Bangladesh) Eyamin Hossain | 21–2 | 21–5 | |
| 24 Oct | Madhavan Akash Sethu (India) | 0–2 | (Indonesia) Subhan | 3–21 | 4–21 | |

== Elimination round ==
Top two ranked in each group qualified to the elimination round, the draw was decided after the previous round finished.

Quarter-finals
1 | Chu Man Kai (HKG) | 21 | 22
Zeng Qingtao (CHN) | 4 | 20
3/4 | Wong Chun Yim (HKG) | 21 | 21
Subhan (INA) | 17 | 6
Lin Naili (CHN) | 21 | 21
3/4 | Yohei Hatakemyama (JPN) | 6 | 12
Lee Dae-sung (KOR) | 13 | 21 | 17
2 | Krishna Nagar (IND) | 21 | 14 | 21

Semi-finals
1 | Chu Man Kai (HKG) | 21 | 21
3/4 | Wong Chun Yim (HKG) | 12 | 10
Lin Naili (CHN) | 19 | 21 | 21
2 | Krishna Nagar (IND) | 21 | 18 | 23

Final
1 | Chu Man Kai (HKG) | 21 | 8 | 21
2 | Krishna Nagar (IND) | 10 | 21 | 11
