= Badminton at the 2022 Asian Para Games – Men's doubles SH6 =

Badminton championships

Badminton's men's doubles SH6 at the 2022 Asian Para Games
- Venue: Binjiang Gymnasium, Hangzhou
- Dates: 23 – 27 August 2023
- Competitors: 12 from 5 nations

Medalists
gold medal	Lin Naili; Zeng Qingtao	China
silver medal	Chu Man Kai; Wong Chun Yim	Hong Kong
bronze medal	Krishna Nagar; Sivarajan Solaimalai	India
bronze medal	Dimas Tri Aji; Subhan	Indonesia

The men's doubles SH6 badminton tournament at the 2022 Asian Para Games is playing from 23 to 27 October 2023 in Binjiang Gymnasium, Hangzhou. A total of 6 pairs competed at the tournament, two of whom was seeded.

== Competition schedule ==
Plays are taking place between 23 and 27 October 2023.

GS	Group stage	½	Semifinals	F	Final

Events	Fri 20	Sat 21	Sun 22	Mon 23	Tue 24	Wed 25	Thu 26	Fri 27
Men's doubles SH6				GS	GS	GS	½	F

== Seeds ==
The following players were seeded:

1. Chu Man Kai / Wong Chun Yim (HKG) (final; silver medalists)
2. Krishna Nagar / Sivarajan Solaimalai (IND) (semi-finals; bronze medalists)

== Group stage ==
=== Group A ===
Pos	Team	Pld	W	L	GF	GA	GD	PF	PA	PD	Qualification
1	Chu Man Kai (HKG) Wong Chun Yim (HKG) [1]	2	2	0	4	1	+3	96	54	+42	Qualification to elimination stage
2	Lin Naili (CHN) Zeng Qingtao (CHN) (H)	2	1	1	3	2	+1	89	65	+24	Qualification to elimination stage
3	Vadakkayil Areeparamb (IND) Madhavan Akash Sethu (IND)	2	0	2	0	4	−4	18	84	−66	

Source: Group A – standings
(H) Host

Date		Score		Game 1	Game 2	Game 3
23 Oct	Lin Naili (China); Zeng Qingtao (China)	2–0	(India) Vadakkayil Areeparamb (India) Madhavan Akash Sethu	21–7	21–4	
24 Oct	Chu Man Kai (Hong Kong); Wong Chun Yim (Hong Kong)	2–1	(China) Lin Naili (China) Zeng Qingtao	21–14	12–21	21–12
25 Oct	Chu Man Kai (Hong Kong); Wong Chun Yim (Hong Kong)	2–0	(India) Vadakkayil Areeparamb (India) Madhavan Akash Sethu	21–3	21–4	

=== Group B ===
Pos	Team	Pld	W	L	GF	GA	GD	PF	PA	PD	Qualification
1	Dimas Tri Aji (INA) Subhan (INA)	2	2	0	4	0	+4	84	65	+19	Qualification to elimination stage
2	Krishna Nagar (IND) Sivarajan Solaimalai (IND) [2]	2	1	1	2	3	−1	96	96	0	Qualification to elimination stage
3	Natthapong Meechai (THA) Bunthan Yaemmali (THA)	2	0	2	1	4	−3	83	102	−19	

Source: Group B – standings

Date		Score		Game 1	Game 2	Game 3
23 Oct	Natthapong Meechai (Thailand); Bunthan Yaemmali (Thailand)	0–2	(Indonesia) Dimas Tri Aji (Indonesia) Subhan	17–21	12–21	
24 Oct	Krishna Nagar (India); Sivarajan Solaimalai (India)	2–1	(Thailand) Natthapong Meechai (Thailand) Bunthan Yaemmali	18–21	21–14	21–19
25 Oct	Krishna Nagar (India); Sivarajan Solaimalai (India)	0–2	(Indonesia) Dimas Tri Aji (Indonesia) Subhan	18–21	18–21	

== Elimination round ==
Top two ranked in each group qualified to the elimination round, the draw will be decided after the previous round finished.

Semi-finals
1	Chu Man Kai (HKG); Wong Chun Yim (HKG)	21	21
2	Krishna Nagar (IND); Sivarajan Solaimalai (IND)	8	5
Lin Naili (CHN); Zeng Qingtao (CHN)	21	12	21
Dimas Tri Aji (INA); Subhan (INA)	13	21	5

Final
1	Chu Man Kai (HKG); Wong Chun Yim (HKG)	14	8
Lin Naili (CHN); Zeng Qingtao (CHN)	21	21
