= Rina Marlina =

Indonesian para-badminton player (born 1993)

Personal information
- Born: 3 November 1993 (age 32) Tasikmalaya, West Java, Indonesia

Sport
- Country: Indonesia
- Sport: Badminton
- Event: SH6
Medal record
Women's para-badminton
Representing Indonesia
Paralympic Games
Bronze medal – third place	2024 Paris	Mixed doubles
World Championships
Gold medal – first place	2022 Tokyo	Women's singles
Gold medal – first place	2022 Tokyo	Mixed doubles
Bronze medal – third place	2026 Manama	Women's singles
Bronze medal – third place	2026 Manama	Mixed doubles
Asian Para Games
Gold medal – first place	2022 Hangzhou	Mixed doubles
Gold medal – first place	2026 Aichi–Nagoya	Mixed doubles
Silver medal – second place	2022 Hangzhou	Women's singles
Silver medal – second place	2026 Aichi–Nagoya	Women's doubles
Bronze medal – third place	2026 Aichi–Nagoya	Women's singles
ASEAN Para Games
Gold medal – first place	2022 Surakarta	Women's singles
Gold medal – first place	2022 Surakarta	Mixed doubles
Gold medal – first place	2023 Cambodia	Women's singles
Gold medal – first place	2023 Cambodia	Mixed doubles

Rina Marlina (born 3 November 1993) is an Indonesian para-badminton player who competes in the singles and mixed doubles SH6 events. She competed at the 2024 Summer Paralympics, where she won the bronze medal match of the mixed doubles SH6 event with Subhan.

== Career ==
Marlina competed at the 2022 BWF Para-Badminton World Championships, winning the gold medal in both of her events. At the rescheduled 2022 Asian Para Games, she won the gold medal in mixed doubles and silver in singles. As a result of her achievements, Marlina was awarded Female Para-badminton Player of the Year for 2023.

She competed at the 2024 Summer Paralympics, where she reached the bronze medal match of the women's singles and mixed doubles events, winning the latter.

== Achievements ==
=== Paralympic Games ===
Mixed doubles

Year	Venue	Partner	Opponent	Score	Result	Ref
2024	Arena Porte de La Chapelle, Paris, France	(Indonesia) Subhan	(India) Sivarajan Solaimalai (India) Nithya Sre Sivan	21–17, 21–12	Bronze	

=== World Championships ===
Women's singles

Year	Venue	Opponent	Score	Result	Ref
2022	Yoyogi National Gymnasium, Tokyo, Japan	(Peru) Giuliana Póveda	21–14, 21–14	Gold	
2026	Isa Sports City, Manama, Bahrain	(India) Nithya Sre Sivan	11–21, 11–21	Bronze	

Mixed doubles

Year	Venue	Partner	Opponent	Score	Result	Ref
2022	Yoyogi National Gymnasium, Tokyo, Japan	(Indonesia) Subhan	(Peru) Nilton Quispe (Peru) Giuliana Póveda	21–9, 21–15	Gold	
2026	Isa Sports City, Manama, Bahrain	(Indonesia) Subhan	(China) Zeng Qingtao (China) Lin Shuangbao	12–21, 17–21	Bronze	

=== Asian Para Games ===
Women's singles

Year	Venue	Opponent	Score	Result	Ref
2022	Binjiang Gymnasium, Hangzhou, China	(China) Li Fengmei	18–21, 10–19 retired	Silver	
2026	Ichinomiya City Municipal Gymnasium, Ichinomiya, Japan	(China) Li Fengmei	5–21, 5–21	Bronze	

Women's doubles

Year	Venue	Partner	Opponent	Score	Result	Ref
2026	Ichinomiya City Municipal Gymnasium, Ichinomiya, Japan	(Indonesia) Apriliyana Sulistyawati	(Chinese Taipei) Cai Yi-lin (Chinese Taipei) Wu Yu-yen	21–19, 21–8	Silver	
2026	Ichinomiya City Municipal Gymnasium, Ichinomiya, Japan	(Indonesia) Apriliyana Sulistyawati	(China) Li Fengmei (China) Lin Shuangbao	6–21, 2–21	Silver	

Mixed doubles

Year	Venue	Partner	Opponent	Score	Result	Ref
2022	Binjiang Gymnasium, Hangzhou, China	(Indonesia) Subhan	(China) Zeng Qingtao (China) Lin Shuangbao	21–17, 21–9	Gold	
2026	Ichinomiya City Municipal Gymnasium, Ichinomiya, Japan	(Indonesia) Subhan	(China) Zeng Qingtao (China) Lin Shuangbao	21–16, 11–21, 21–15	Gold	

=== ASEAN Para Games ===
Women's singles

Year	Venue	Opponent	Score	Result
2023	Morodok Techo Badminton Hall, Phnom Penh, Cambodia	(Thailand) Chai Saeyang	21–7, 21–6	Gold

Mixed doubles

Year	Venue	Partner	Opponent	Score	Result
2023	Morodok Techo Badminton Hall, Phnom Penh, Cambodia	(Indonesia) Subhan	(Thailand) Nattapong Meechai (Thailand) Chai Saeyang		Gold

=== BWF Para Badminton World Circuit (23 titles, 2 runners-up) ===
The BWF Para Badminton World Circuit – Grade 2, Level 1, 2 and 3 tournaments has been sanctioned by the Badminton World Federation from 2022.

Women's singles

Year	Tournament	Level	Opponent	Score	Result	Ref
2022	Dubai Para Badminton International	Level 2	(India) Nithya Sre Sivan	21–13, 21–10	(gold) Winner	
2022 (Note: This tournament uses a round robin system.)	Indonesia Para Badminton International	Level 3	(Indonesia) Yunia Widya Irianti	21–7, 21–7	(gold) Winner	
2022	Indonesia Para Badminton International	Level 3	(Poland) Oliwia Szmigiel	21–7, 21–7	(gold) Winner	
2022	Indonesia Para Badminton International	Level 3	(Poland) Daria Bujnicka	21–8, 21–9	(gold) Winner	
2023	Spanish Para Badminton International	Level 2	(India) Nithya Sre Sivan	21–8, 21–15	(gold) Winner	
2023	Spanish Para Badminton International	Level 1	(Peru) Giuliana Póveda	22–20, 21–10	(gold) Winner	
2023	Canada Para Badminton International	Level 2	(Peru) Giuliana Póveda	21–14, 21–16	(gold) Winner	
2023	4 Nations Para Badminton International	Level 1	(India) Nithya Sre Sivan	21–17, 21–8	(gold) Winner	
2023	Western Australia Para Badminton International	Level 2	(Peru) Giuliana Póveda	21–11, 21–14	(gold) Winner	
2024	Indonesia Para Badminton International	Level 2	(Indonesia) Yunia Widya Irianti	21–7, 21–5	(gold) Winner	
2026	French Para Badminton International	Level 2	(India) Nithya Sre Sivan	19–21, 9–21	(silver) Runner-up	

Singles

Year	Tournament	Level	Opponent	Score	Result	Ref
2023	Indonesia Para Badminton International	Level 3	(Indonesia) Dimas Tri Aji	21–11, 21–7	(gold) Winner	

Mixed doubles

Year	Tournament	Level	Partner	Opponent	Score	Result	Ref
2022	Dubai Para Badminton International	Level 2	(Indonesia) Subhan	(Thailand) Natthapong Meechai (Thailand) Chai Saeyang	21–19, 22–20	(gold) Winner	
2022 (Note: This tournament uses a round robin system.)	Indonesia Para Badminton International	Level 3	(Indonesia) Subhan	(Singapore) Xavier Lim (Poland) Daria Bujnicka	21–4, 21–5	(gold) Winner	
2022	Indonesia Para Badminton International	Level 3	(Indonesia) Subhan	(Peru) Jesús Salva (Poland) Oliwia Szmigiel	21–2, 21–3	(gold) Winner	
2022	Indonesia Para Badminton International	Level 3	(Indonesia) Subhan	(Indonesia) Dimas Tri Aji (Indonesia) Yunia Widya Irianti	21–11, 21–12	(gold) Winner	
2023	Spanish Para Badminton International	Level 2	(Indonesia) Subhan	(Thailand) Natthapong Meechai (Thailand) Chai Saeyang	21–8, 21–12	(gold) Winner	
2023	Spanish Para Badminton International	Level 1	(Indonesia) Subhan	(Peru) Nilton Quispe (Peru) Giuliana Póveda	21–12, 21–3	(gold) Winner	
2023	Thailand Para Badminton International	Level 2	(Indonesia) Subhan	(China) Lin Naili (China) Li Fengmei	21–16, 21–10	(gold) Winner	
2023	Canada Para Badminton International	Level 1	(Indonesia) Subhan	(India) Sivarajan Solaimalai (India) Nithya Sre Sivan	21–5, 21–16	(gold) Winner	
2023	4 Nations Para Badminton International	Level 1	(Indonesia) Subhan	(England) Jack Shephard (England) Rachel Choong	21–19, 21–8	(gold) Winner	
2023	Western Australia Para Badminton International	Level 2	(Indonesia) Subhan	(Hong Kong) Chu Man Kai (Hong Kong) Choi Wing Kei	21–6, 21–13	(gold) Winner	
2024	4 Nations Para Badminton International	Level 1	(Indonesia) Subhan	(India) Sivarajan Solaimalai (India) Nithya Sre Sivan	21–12, 21–15	(gold) Winner	
2024	Indonesia Para Badminton International	Level 2	(Indonesia) Subhan	(Indonesia) Revandra (Indonesia) Apriliyana Sulistyawati	21–1, 21–15	(gold) Winner	
2025	British & Irish Para Badminton International	Level 1	(Indonesia) Subhan	(England) Jack Shephard (England) Rachel Choong	21–23, 21–14, 21–11	(gold) Winner	
2025	Indonesia Para Badminton International	Level 1	(Indonesia) Subhan	(India) Krishna Nagar (India) Nithya Sre Sivan	21–13, 21–9	(gold) Winner	
2026	French Para Badminton International	Level 2	(Indonesia) Subhan	(England) Jack Shephard (England) Rachel Choong	21–10, 21–13	(gold) Winner	
2026	British & Irish Para Badminton International	Level 1	(Indonesia) Subhan	(India) Krishna Nagar (India) Nithya Sre Sivan	21–19, 21–12	(gold) Winner	

Doubles

Year	Tournament	Level	Partner	Opponent	Score	Result
2022	Indonesia Para Badminton International	Level 3	(Indonesia) Yunia Widya Irianti	(Poland) Daria Bujnicka (Poland) Oliwia Szmigiel	21–18, 21–19	(silver) Runner-up
2022	Indonesia Para Badminton International	Level 3	(Indonesia) Yunia Widya Irianti	(Singapore) Xavier Lim (Peru) Jesús Salva	21–14, 21–18	(silver) Runner-up
2022	Indonesia Para Badminton International	Level 3	(Indonesia) Yunia Widya Irianti	(Indonesia) Subhan (Indonesia) Dimas Tri Aji	10–21, 12–21	(silver) Runner-up

=== International tournaments ===
Women's singles

Year	Tournament	Opponent	Score	Result	Ref
2019 (Note: This tournament uses a round robin system.)	China Para Badminton International	(Chinese Taipei) Cai Yi-lin	21–15, 21–18	(silver) Runner-up	
2019	China Para Badminton International	(Ukraine) Nina Kozlova	18–21, 12–21	(silver) Runner-up	
