= Subhan (para-badminton) =

Indonesian para-badminton player (born 1994)

Personal information
- Born: 6 May 1994 (age 32) Jepara, Central Java, Indonesia

Sport
- Country: Indonesia
- Sport: Badminton
- Event: SH6
Medal record
Men's para-badminton
Representing Indonesia
Paralympic Games
Bronze medal – third place	2024 Paris	Mixed doubles
World Championships
Gold medal – first place	2022 Tokyo	Mixed doubles
Bronze medal – third place	2026 Manama	Mixed doubles
World Abilitysport Games
Gold medal – first place	2023 Nakhon Ratchasima	Men's singles
Gold medal – first place	2023 Nakhon Ratchasima	Men's doubles
Asian Para Games
Gold medal – first place	2022 Hangzhou	Mixed doubles
Gold medal – first place	2026 Aichi–Nagoya	Mixed doubles
Bronze medal – third place	2022 Hangzhou	Men's doubles
Bronze medal – third place	2026 Aichi–Nagoya	Men's doubles
ASEAN Para Games
Gold medal – first place	2022 Surakarta	Men's singles
Gold medal – first place	2022 Surakarta	Mixed doubles
Gold medal – first place	2023 Phnom Penh	Men's doubles
Gold medal – first place	2023 Phnom Penh	Mixed doubles
Silver medal – second place	2023 Phnom Penh	Men's singles

Subhan (born 6 May 1994) is an Indonesian para-badminton player. He competed at the 2024 Summer Paralympics, where he won the bronze medal match of the mixed doubles SH6 event with Rina Marlina.

== Career ==
Subhan competed at the 2022 BWF Para-Badminton World Championships, winning the gold medal in mixed doubles event with Rina Marlina. At the rescheduled 2022 Asian Para Games, he won the gold medal in mixed doubles and bronze in men's doubles.

Subhan competed at the 2024 Summer Paralympics, winning the bronze medal in mixed doubles event with Rina Marlina.

== Achievements ==
=== Paralympic Games ===
Mixed doubles

Year	Venue	Partner	Opponent	Score	Result	Ref
2024	Arena Porte de La Chapelle, Paris, France	(Indonesia) Rina Marlina	(India) Sivarajan Solaimalai (India) Nithya Sre Sivan	21–17, 21–12	Bronze	

=== World Championships ===
Mixed doubles

Year	Venue	Partner	Opponent	Score	Result	Ref
2022	Yoyogi National Gymnasium, Tokyo, Japan	(Indonesia) Rina Marlina	(Peru) Nilton Quispe (Peru) Giuliana Póveda	21–9, 21–15	Gold	
2026	Isa Sports City, Manama, Bahrain	(Indonesia) Rina Marlina	(China) Zeng Qingtao (China) Lin Shuangbao	12–21, 17–21	Bronze	

=== World Abilitysport Games ===
Men's singles

Year	Venue	Opponent	Score	Result	Ref
2023	Terminal 21 Korat Hall, Nakhon Ratchasima, Thailand	(India) Dhinagaran Pandurangan	21–11, 21–10	Gold	

Men's doubles

Year	Venue	Partner	Opponent	Score	Result	Ref
2023	Terminal 21 Korat Hall, Nakhon Ratchasima, Thailand	(Thailand) Bunthan Yaemmali	(Iraq) Emad Al-Dhawahir (Germany) Robin Weiler	21–6, 21–3	(gold) Winner	
2023	Terminal 21 Korat Hall, Nakhon Ratchasima, Thailand	(Thailand) Bunthan Yaemmali	(Chinese Taipei) Cai Yi-lin (Chinese Taipei) Wu Yu-yen	21–12, 21–11	(gold) Winner	
2023	Terminal 21 Korat Hall, Nakhon Ratchasima, Thailand	(Thailand) Bunthan Yaemmali	(India) Balasubramanian Rajkumar (India) Latatai Parmeshwar Umrekar	21–5, 21–15	(gold) Winner	
2023	Terminal 21 Korat Hall, Nakhon Ratchasima, Thailand	(Thailand) Bunthan Yaemmali	(India) Sudarsan Saravanakumar Muthusamy (India) Dhinagaran Pandurangan	21–14, 21–19	(gold) Winner	

=== Asian Para Games ===
Men's doubles

Year	Venue	Partner	Opponent	Score	Result	Ref
2022	Binjiang Gymnasium, Hangzhou, China	(Indonesia) Dimas Tri Aji	(China) Lin Naili (China) Zeng Qingtao	13–21, 21–12, 5–21	Bronze	
2026	Ichinomiya City Municipal Gymnasium, Ichinomiya, Japan	(Indonesia) Dimas Tri Aji	(China) Lin Naili (China) Zeng Qingtao	15–21, 16–21	Bronze	
2026	Ichinomiya City Municipal Gymnasium, Ichinomiya, Japan	(Indonesia) Dimas Tri Aji	(India) Krishna Nagar (India) Sivarajan Solaimalai	20–22, 18–21	Bronze	
2026	Ichinomiya City Municipal Gymnasium, Ichinomiya, Japan	(Indonesia) Dimas Tri Aji	(Hong Kong) Chu Man Kai (Hong Kong) Wong Chun Yim	21–17, 21–17	Bronze	

Mixed doubles

Year	Venue	Partner	Opponent	Score	Result	Ref
2022	Binjiang Gymnasium, Hangzhou, China	(Indonesia) Rina Marlina	(China) Zeng Qingtao (China) Lin Shuangbao	21–17, 21–9	Gold	
2026	Ichinomiya City Municipal Gymnasium, Ichinomiya, Japan	(Indonesia) Rina Marlina	(China) Zeng Qingtao (China) Lin Shuangbao	21–16, 11–21, 21–15	Gold	

=== BWF Para Badminton World Circuit (19 titles, 1 runner-up) ===
The BWF Para Badminton World Circuit – Grade 2, Level 1, 2 and 3 tournaments has been sanctioned by the Badminton World Federation since 2022.

Men's singles

Year	Tournament	Level	Opponent	Score	Result	Ref
2022	Dubai Para Badminton International	Level 2	(Hong Kong) Chu Man Kai	10–21, 9–21	(silver) Runner-up	
2022 (Note: This tournament uses a round robin system.)	Indonesia Para Badminton International	Level 3	(Indonesia) Dimas Tri Aji	21–17, 19–21, 21–17	(gold) Winner	
2022	Indonesia Para Badminton International	Level 3	(Singapore) Xavier Lim	21–9, 21–6	(gold) Winner	
2022	Indonesia Para Badminton International	Level 3	(Peru) Jesús Salva	21–11, 21–17	(gold) Winner	
2024	Indonesia Para Badminton International	Level 2	(India) Sivarajan Solaimalai	21–19, 21–15	(gold) Winner	

Men's doubles

Year	Tournament	Level	Partner	Opponent	Score	Result	Ref
2026	French Para Badminton International	Level 2	(Indonesia) Dimas Tri Aji	(France) Charles Noakes (Brazil) Vitor Tavares	15–21, 21–19, 21–19	(gold) Winner	

Mixed doubles

Year	Tournament	Level	Partner	Opponent	Score	Result	Ref
2022	Dubai Para Badminton International	Level 2	(Indonesia) Rina Marlina	(Thailand) Natthapong Meechai (Thailand) Chai Saeyang	21–19, 22–20	(gold) Winner	
2022	Indonesia Para Badminton International	Level 3	(Indonesia) Rina Marlina	(Indonesia) Dimas Tri Aji (Indonesia) Irianti Yunia Widya	21–11, 21–12	(gold) Winner	
2022	Indonesia Para Badminton International	Level 3	(Indonesia) Rina Marlina	(Singapore) Xavier Lim (Poland) Daria Bujnicka	21–4, 21–5	(gold) Winner	
2022	Indonesia Para Badminton International	Level 3	(Indonesia) Rina Marlina	(Peru) Jesús Salva (Poland) Oliwia Szmigiel	21–2, 21–3	(gold) Winner	
2023	Spanish Para Badminton International	Level 2	(Indonesia) Rina Marlina	(Thailand) Natthapong Meechai (Thailand) Chai Saeyang	21–8, 21–12	(gold) Winner	
2023	Spanish Para Badminton International	Level 1	(Indonesia) Rina Marlina	(Peru) Nilton Quispe (Peru) Giuliana Póveda	21–12, 21–3	(gold) Winner	
2023	Thailand Para Badminton International	Level 2	(Indonesia) Rina Marlina	(China) Lin Naili (China) Li Fengmei	21–16, 21–10	(gold) Winner	
2023	Canada Para Badminton International	Level 1	(Indonesia) Rina Marlina	(India) Sivarajan Solaimalai (India) Nithya Sre Sivan	21–5, 21–16	(gold) Winner	
2023	4 Nations Para Badminton International	Level 1	(Indonesia) Rina Marlina	(England) Jack Shephard (England) Rachel Choong	21–19, 21–8	(gold) Winner	
2023	Western Australia Para Badminton International	Level 2	(Indonesia) Rina Marlina	(Hong Kong) Chu Man Kai (Hong Kong) Choi Wing Kei	21–6, 21–13	(gold) Winner	
2024	4 Nations Para Badminton International	Level 1	(Indonesia) Rina Marlina	(India) Sivarajan Solaimalai (India) Nithya Sre Sivan	21–12, 21–15	(gold) Winner	
2024	Indonesia Para Badminton International	Level 2	(Indonesia) Rina Marlina	(Indonesia) Revandra (Indonesia) Apriliyana Sulistyawati	21–1, 21–15	(gold) Winner	
2025	British & Irish Para Badminton International	Level 1	(Indonesia) Rina Marlina	(England) Jack Shephard (England) Rachel Choong	21–23, 21–14, 21–11	(gold) Winner	
2025	Indonesia Para Badminton International	Level 1	(Indonesia) Rina Marlina	(India) Krishna Nagar (India) Nithya Sre Sivan	21–13, 21–9	(gold) Winner	
2026	French Para Badminton International	Level 2	(Indonesia) Rina Marlina	(England) Jack Shephard (England) Rachel Choong	21–10, 21–13	(gold) Winner	
2026	British & Irish Para Badminton International	Level 1	(Indonesia) Rina Marlina	(India) Krishna Nagar (India) Nithya Sre Sivan	21–19, 21–12	(gold) Winner	

Doubles

Year	Tournament	Level	Partner	Opponent	Score	Result	Ref
2022	Indonesia Para Badminton International	Level 3	(Indonesia) Dimas Tri Aji	(Indonesia) Irianti Yunia Widya (Indonesia) Rina Marlina	21–12, 21–10	(gold) Winner	
2022	Indonesia Para Badminton International	Level 3	(Indonesia) Dimas Tri Aji	(Poland) Daria Bujnicka (Poland) Oliwia Szmigiel	21–5, 21–11	(gold) Winner	
2022	Indonesia Para Badminton International	Level 3	(Indonesia) Dimas Tri Aji	(Singapore) Xavier Lim (Peru) Jesús Salva	21–13, 21–13	(gold) Winner	
2023	Indonesia Para Badminton International	Level 3	(Indonesia) Dimas Tri Aji	(Indonesia) Irianti Yunia Widya (Indonesia) Rina Marlina	21–3, 21–16	(gold) Winner	
2023	Indonesia Para Badminton International	Level 3	(Indonesia) Dimas Tri Aji	(Kuwait) Abdulla A Alsaif (Bangladesh) Md Eyamin Hossain	21–5, 21–10	(gold) Winner	
2023	Indonesia Para Badminton International	Level 3	(Indonesia) Dimas Tri Aji	(India) Dhinagaran Pandurangan (Peru) Jesús Salva	6–21, 21–16, 21–12	(gold) Winner	
