= Badminton at the 2024 Summer Paralympics – Mixed doubles SH6 =

Badminton competition

Mixed doubles SH6 at the XVII Paralympic Games
- Venue: Arena Porte de La Chapelle, Paris
- Dates: 29 August 2024 – 2 September 2024
- Competitors: 12 from 6 nations

Medalists
1st place, gold medalist(s)		Lin Naili; Li Fengmei	China
2nd place, silver medalist(s)		Miles Krajewski; Jayci Simon	United States
3rd place, bronze medalist(s)		Subhan; Rina Marlina	Indonesia

The mixed doubles SH6 tournament at the 2024 Summer Paralympics in France will take place between 29 August and 2 September 2024 at Arena Porte de La Chapelle.

== Classification ==
- SH6
  Players in this class have short stature caused by achondroplasia or other genetic conditions.

== Seeds ==
These were the seeds for this event:

1. Jack Shephard / Rachel Choong (GBR) (group stage)
2. Sivarajan Solaimalai / Nithya Sre Sivan (IND) (semifinals)

== Group stage ==
The draw of the group stage revealed on 24 August 2024. The group stage will be played from 29 to 30 August. The top two winners of each group advanced to the knockout rounds.

=== Group A ===
Pos	Team	Pld	W	L	GF	GA	GD	PF	PA	PD	Pts	Qualification
1	Subhan (INA) [SH6] Rina Marlina (INA) [SH6]	2	2	0	2	0	+2	103	72	+31	2	Semi-finals
2	Lin Naili (CHN) [SH6] Li Fengmei (CHN) [SH6]	2	1	1	3	2	+1	90	79	+11	1	Semi-finals
3	Jack Shephard (GBR) [SH6] Rachel Choong (GBR) [SH6]	2	0	2	0	4	−4	44	84	−40	0	

First match(es) will be played: 29 August 2024. Source: COJOP2024

Date	Time	Player 1	Score	Player 2	Set 1	Set 2	Set 3	Report
Aug 29	9:10	Jack Shephard (United Kingdom); Rachel Choong (United Kingdom)	0–2	(Indonesia) Subhan (Indonesia) Rina Marlina	14–21	12–21		Report
Aug 29	20:00	Subhan (Indonesia); Rina Marlina (Indonesia)	2–1	(China) Lin Naili (China) Li Fengmei	19–21	21–12	21–15	Report
Aug 30	22:00	Jack Shephard (United Kingdom); Rachel Choong (United Kingdom)	0–2	(China) Lin Naili (China) Li Fengmei	11–21	7–21		Report

=== Group B ===
Pos	Team	Pld	W	L	GF	GA	GD	PF	PA	PD	Pts	Qualification
1	Sivarajan Solaimalai (IND) [SH6] Nithya Sre Sivan (IND) [SH6]	2	1	1	2	2	0	74	68	+6	1	Semi-finals
2	Miles Krajewski (USA) [SH6] Jayci Simon (USA) [SH6]	2	1	1	2	2	0	73	74	−1	1	Semi-finals
3	Natthapong Meechai (THA) [SH6] Chai Saeyang (THA) [SH6]	2	1	1	2	2	0	66	71	−5	1	

First match(es) will be played: 29 August 2024. Source: COJOP2024

Date	Time	Player 1	Score	Player 2	Set 1	Set 2	Set 3	Report
Aug 29	9:10	Sivarajan Solaimalai (India); Nithya Sre Sivan (India)	0–2	(United States) Miles Krajewski (United States) Jayci Simon	21–23	11–21		Report
Aug 29	20:00	Miles Krajewski (United States); Jayci Simon (United States)	0–2	(Thailand) Natthapong Meechai (Thailand) Chai Saeyang	12–21	17–21		Report
Aug 30	22:00	Sivarajan Solaimalai (India); Nithya Sre Sivan (India)	2–0	(Thailand) Natthapong Meechai (Thailand) Chai Saeyang	21–7	21–17		Report

== Finals ==
The knockout stage will be played from 31 August to 1 September.

Semi-finals
A1	Subhan (INA); Rina Marlina (INA)	21	16	19
A2	Lin Naili (CHN); Li Fengmei (CHN)	17	21	21
B2	Miles Krajewski (USA); Jayci Simon (USA)	17	21	21
B1	Sivarajan Solaimalai (IND); Nithya Sre Sivan (IND)	21	14	13

Gold medal match
A2	Lin Naili (CHN) (gold); Li Fengmei (CHN)	21	21
B2	Miles Krajewski (USA) (silver); Jayci Simon (USA)	14	12
Bronze medal match
A1	Subhan (INA) (bronze); Rina Marlina (INA)	21	21
B1	Sivarajan Solaimalai (IND); Nithya Sre Sivan (IND)	17	12
