= Rachana Patel =

Indian Paralympic athlete

Sport
- Country: India
- Sport: Para-badminton
Medal record
Para-badminton
Representing India
Asian Para Games
Bronze medal – third place	2022 Hangzhou	Women's doubles team
World Championships
Silver medal – second place	2024 Pattaya	Women's doubles
Bronze medal – third place	2022 Tokyo	Women's doubles

Rachana Patel (born 1997) is an Indian para-badminton player. She won a bronze medals at the 2022 Asian Para Games. She claimed bronze in the women's doubles in the SH6 category along with Nithya Sre Sivan on 25 October 2023 at Hangzhou, China.

== Early life and education ==
She hails from Becharaji village Mehsana District but resides in Ahmedabad, Gujarat. Her parents are Shailesh Patel and Bhavana. She did her MBBS in China. She has a brother, who is settled in Canada. She had to undergo seven surgeries due to Scoliosis, a sideways curvature of the spine and lives with 12 screws and two rods in her back.

== Career ==
Patel won a bronze medal at the 2022 Asian Para Games in Badminton women's doubles SH6 category pairing with Nithya Sre Sivan. In May 2023, she won a bronze medal in the women's doubles at Para Badminton International at Pattaya, Thailand. Later on 23 May 2023, she continued her form winning a silver medal with Nithya Sre at the Bahrain Para-Badminton International in Manama. In December 2022, she won a bronze with the same partner at the Peru Para Badminton International at Lima. In November 2022, she won a bronze medal at the BWF Para Badminton World Championships 2022 with her partner Nithya Sre.

== Achievements ==
=== World Championships ===
Women’s doubles

Year	Venue	Partner	Opponent	Score	Result
2022	Yoyogi National Gymnasium, Tokyo, Japan	(India) Nithya Sre Sivan	(Peru) Rubí Fernández (Peru) Giuliana Póveda	7–21, 3–6 retired	Bronze
2024	Pattaya Exhibition and Convention Hall, Pattaya, Thailand	(India) Nithya Sre Sivan	(China) Li Fengmei (China) Lin Shuangbao	5–13 retired	Silver
