= Nithya Sre Sivan =

Indian para badminton player (born 2005)

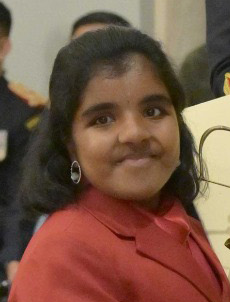
- Sivan in January 2025

Personal information
- Native name: நித்ய ஸ்ரீ சிவன்
- Born: Nithya Sre Sumathy Sivan; 7 January 2005 (age 21) Karur, Tamil Nadu, India

Sport
- Sport: Badminton

Women's singles and doubles SH6
- Highest ranking: 1 (WS, 22 November 2022); 2 (WD with Rachana Patel, 18 May 2024); 1 (XD with Krishna Nagar, 8 September 2025)
- Current ranking: 1 (WS); 4 (WD with Patel); 1 (XD with Nagar) (20 January 2026)
Medal record
Para badminton
Representing India
Paralympic Games
Bronze medal – third place	2024 Paris	Women's singles
World Championships
Silver medal – second place	2024 Pattaya	Women's doubles
Silver medal – second place	2026 Manama	Women's singles
Bronze medal – third place	2022 Tokyo	Women's singles
Bronze medal – third place	2022 Tokyo	Women's doubles
Bronze medal – third place	2022 Tokyo	Mixed doubles
Bronze medal – third place	2024 Pattaya	Women's singles
Bronze medal – third place	2026 Manama	Mixed doubles
Asian Para Games
Bronze medal – third place	2022 Hangzhou	Women's singles
Bronze medal – third place	2022 Hangzhou	Women's doubles
Bronze medal – third place	2022 Hangzhou	Mixed doubles
Asian Championships
Silver medal – second place	2025 Nakhon Ratchasima	Women's singles
Silver medal – second place	2025 Nakhon Ratchasima	Women's doubles
Silver medal – second place	2025 Nakhon Ratchasima	Mixed doubles
Asian Youth Para Games
Gold medal – first place	2021 Manama	Women's singles
Gold medal – first place	2025 Dubai	Women's singles
Silver medal – second place	2021 Manama	Mixed doubles
Bronze medal – third place	2025 Dubai	Open doubles

Nithya Sre Sumathy Sivan (born 7 January 2005) is an Indian para-badminton player from Tamil Nadu. She plays in the SH6 category (athletes having achondroplasia and short stature). She represented India at the 2024 Summer Paralympics, where she won the bronze medal in the women's singles SH6 event. Sivan has also won medals in the Para World Championships, the Asian Para Championships, and the Asian Para Games respectively.

== Early life ==
Sivan is from Karur, Tamil Nadu. She was born on 7 January 2005. Brought up in Hosur. She started playing badminton with the able-bodied sportspersons in 2016 for fun and recreation. Later in 2019, she learnt about the para games and shifted her focus to competitive badminton and started training under coach Gaurav Khanna in Lucknow.

== Career ==
In October 2023, she won two bronze medals at the Asian Para Games. In April 2023, she won two gold medals at the Brazil Para Badminton International meet. In May 2022, the Asian Youth Para Games winner also won a gold medal at the 1st Bahrain Para Badminton International Championships in Manama. In December 2022, she bagged a gold in the women's singles SH6 finals defeating Worlds silver medallist at the Peru Para Badminton International in Lima.

== Achievements ==
=== Paralympic Games ===
Women's singles SH6
Year	Venue	Opponent	Score	Result
2024	Porte de La Chapelle Arena, Paris, France	(Indonesia) Rina Marlina	21–14, 21–6	(bronze) Bronze

=== World Championships ===
Women's singles SH6
Year	Venue	Opponent	Score	Result
2022	Yoyogi National Gymnasium, Tokyo, Japan	(Indonesia) Rina Marlina	19–21, 21–12, 19–21	Bronze
2024	Pattaya Exhibition and Convention Hall, Pattaya, Thailand	(China) Li Fengmei	12–21, 20–22	Bronze

Women's doubles SH6
Year	Venue	Partner	Opponent	Score	Result
2022	Yoyogi National Gymnasium, Tokyo, Japan	(India) Rachana Patel	(Peru) Rubí Fernández (Peru) Giuliana Póveda	7–21, 3^{r}–6	Bronze
2024	Pattaya Exhibition and Convention Hall, Pattaya, Thailand	(India) Rachana Patel	(China) Li Fengmei (China) Lin Shuangbao	5^{r}–13	Silver

Mixed doubles SH6
Year	Venue	Partner	Opponent	Score	Result
2022	Yoyogi National Gymnasium, Tokyo, Japan	(India) Krishna Nagar	(Peru) Nilton Quispe (Peru) Giuliana Póveda	16–21, 18–21	Bronze
2026	Isa Sports City, Manama, Bahrain	(India) Krishna Nagar	(China) Lin Naili (China) Li Fengmei	9–21, 21–18, 13–21	Bronze

=== Asian Para Games ===
Women's singles SH6
Year	Venue	Opponent	Score	Result
2023	Binjiang Gymnasium, Hangzhou, China	(Indonesia) Rina Marlina	15–21, 13–21	Bronze

Women's doubles SH6
Year	Venue	Partner	Opponent	W–L	Result
2023	Binjiang Gymnasium, Hangzhou, China	(India) Rachana Patel	Various	1–2	Bronze

Mixed doubles SH6
Year	Venue	Partner	Opponent	Score	Result
2023	Binjiang Gymnasium, Hangzhou, China	(India) Sivarajan Solaimalai	(China) Zeng Qingtao (China) Lin Shuangbao	18–21, 10–21	Bronze
2026	Ichimoniya City Municipal Gymnasium, Aichi, Japan	(India) Krishna Nagar	(Indonesia) Subhan (Indonesia) Rina Marlina	14–21, 18–21	Bronze

=== Asian Para-Badminton Championships ===
Women's singles SH6
Year	Venue	Opponent	Score	Result
2025	Spadt Convention Center, Nakhon Ratchasima, Thailand	(China) Li Fengmei	21–17, 16–21, 18–21	Silver

Women's doubles SH6
Year	Venue	Partner	Opponent	W–L	Result
2025	Spadt Convention Center, Nakhon Ratchasima, Thailand	(India) Rachana Patel	Various	2–1	Silver

Mixed doubles SH6
Year	Venue	Partner	Opponent	Score	Result
2025	Spadt Convention Center, Nakhon Ratchasima, Thailand	(India) Krishna Nagar	(China) Lin Naili (China) Li Fengmei	13–21, 21–19, 14–21	Silver

== Awards ==
- Arjuna Award (Para badminton 2024)
