= Krishna Nagar (para-badminton) =

Indian para badminton player (born 1999)

Personal information
- Born: 12 January 1999 (age 27) Jaipur, Rajasthan, India
- Years active: 2018–present
- Height: 135 cm (4 ft 5 in)
- Weight: 40 kg (88 lb)

Sport
- Country: India
- Sport: Badminton
- Handedness: Left
- Coached by: Abhimanyu Jadoun

Men's singles and doubles SH6
- Highest ranking: 2 (MS 29 August 2019); 2 (MD with Raja Magotra 24 September 2019); 4 (XD with Giuliana Póveda 24 February 2020)
- Current ranking: 4 (MS); 10 (MD with Raja Magotra); 8 (XD with Nithya Sre Sivan) (8 November 2022)
- BWF profile
Medal record
Men's para badminton
Representing India
Paralympic Games
Gold medal – first place	2020 Tokyo	Men's singles
World Championships
Gold medal – first place	2024 Pattaya	Men's singles
Silver medal – second place	2019 Basel	Men's doubles
Bronze medal – third place	2019 Basel	Men's singles
Bronze medal – third place	2022 Tokyo	Mixed doubles
Bronze medal – third place	2026 Manama	Men's singles
Bronze medal – third place	2026 Manama	Mixed doubles
Asian Para Games
Silver medal – second place	2022 Hangzhou	Men's singles
Silver medal – second place	2026 Aichi-Nagoya	Men's doubles
Bronze medal – third place	2018 Jakarta	Men's singles
Bronze medal – third place	2022 Hangzhou	Men's doubles

Krishna Nagar (born 2 January 1999) is an Indian para badminton player from a Gujar family. He had been ranked world number 2 in para-badminton men's Singles SH6. He won a gold medal at the 2020 Summer Paralympics.

== Career ==
In the 2018 Asian Para Games in Indonesia, Krishna Nagar won a bronze medal in the singles event.

In the 2019 BWF Para-Badminton World Championships in Basel, Switzerland Krishna Nagar won the silver medal in the men's doubles event alongside compatriot Raja Magotra. He also won a bronze in the singles event.

In the 2020 Summer Paralympics in Tokyo, Japan, Krishna Nagar won the gold medal in men's singles SH6.

== Achievements ==
=== Paralympic Games ===
Men's singles SH6

Year	Venue	Opponent	Score	Result
2020	Yoyogi National Gymnasium, Tokyo, Japan	(Hong Kong) Chu Man Kai	21–17, 16–21, 21–17	Gold

=== World Championships ===
Men's singles

Year	Venue	Opponent	Score	Result
2019	St. Jakobshalle, Basel, Switzerland	(England) Jack Shephard	13–21, 13–21	Bronze
2024	Pattaya Exhibition and Convention Hall, Pattaya, Thailand	(China) Lin Naili	22–20, 22–20	Gold
2026	Isa Sports City, Manama, Bahrain	(United States) Miles Krajewski	18–21, 14–21	Bronze

Men's doubles SH6

Year	Venue	Partner	Opponent	Score	Result
2019	St. Jakobshalle, Basel, Switzerland	(India) Raja Magotra	(Hong Kong) Chu Man Kai (Hong Kong) Wong Chun Yim	15–21, 21–17, 18–21	Silver

Mixed doubles SH6

Year	Venue	Partner	Opponent	Score	Result
2022	Yoyogi National Gymnasium, Tokyo, Japan	(India) Nithya Sre Sivan	(Peru) Nilton Quispe (Peru) Giuliana Póveda	16–21, 18–21	Bronze
2026	Isa Sports City, Manama, Bahrain	(India) Nithya Sre Sivan	(China) Lin Naili (China) Li Fengmei	9–21, 21–18, 13–21	Bronze

=== Asian Para Games ===
Men's singles SH6

Year	Venue	Opponent	Score	Result
2018	Istora Gelora Bung Karno, Jakarta, Indonesia	(Malaysia) Didin Taresoh	16–21, 20–22	Bronze
2022	Binjiang Gymnasium, Guangzhou, China	(Hong Kong) Chu Man Kai	10–21, 21–8, 11–21	Silver

Men's doubles SH6

Year	Venue	Partner	Opponent	Score	Result
2022	Binjiang Gymnasium, Guangzhou, China	(India) Sivarajan Solaimalai	(Hong Kong) Chu Man Kai (Hong Kong) Wong Chun Yim	8–21, 5–21	Bronze

=== BWF Para Badminton World Circuit (5 titles, 3 runners-up) ===
The BWF Para Badminton World Circuit – Grade 2, Level 1, 2 and 3 tournaments has been sanctioned by the Badminton World Federation from 2022.

Men's singles SH6

Year	Tournament	Level	Opponent	Score	Result
2022	Spanish Para Badminton International II	Level 2	(Brazil) Vitor Tavares	24–26, 21–17, 21–9	(gold) Winner
2022	Spanish Para Badminton International	Level 1	(England) Jack Shephard	13–21, 13–21	(silver) Runner-up
2023	Bahrain Para Badminton International	Level 2	(Hong Kong) Chu Man Kai	14–21, 19–21	(silver) Runner-up
2023	Canada Para Badminton International	Level 1	(England) Jack Shephard	21–18, 21–16	(gold) Winner
2023	4 Nations Para Badminton International	Level 1	(England) Krysten Coombs	21–8, 21–18	(gold) Winner
2024	4 Nations Para Badminton International	Level 1	(Hong Kong) Chu Man Kai	14–21, 21–17, 19–21	(silver) Runner-up
2025	China Para Badminton International	Level 2	(Thailand) Natthapong Meechai	22–20, 7–21, 17–21	(silver) Runner-up
2025	Japan Para Badminton International	Level 2	(United States) Miles Krajewski	22–20, 21–13	(gold) Winner
2026	French Para Badminton International	Level 2	(France) Charles Noakes	21–19, 21–12	(gold) Winner

Men's doubles SH6

Year	Tournament	Level	Partner	Opponent	Score	Result
2023	Thailand Para Badminton International	Level 2	(India) Sivarajan Solaimalai	(Thailand) Natthapong Meechai (Thailand) Bunthan Yaemmali	21–17, 18–21, 21–16	(gold) Winner
2023	Thailand Para Badminton International	Level 2	(India) Sivarajan Solaimalai	(Mexico) Gerardo Castillo (Singapore) Xavier Lim	21–5, 21–10	(gold) Winner
2023	Thailand Para Badminton International	Level 2	(India) Sivarajan Solaimalai	(Peru) Nilton Quispe (Peru) Jesús Salva	21–17, 21–17	(gold) Winner
2023	Thailand Para Badminton International	Level 2	(India) Sivarajan Solaimalai	(South Korea) Lee Dae-sung (France) Fabien Morat	21–16, 21–10	(gold) Winner

Mixed doubles SH6

Year	Tournament	Level	Partner	Opponent	Score	Result
2022	Spanish Para Badminton International II	Level 2	(India) Nithya Sre Sivan	(Peru) Jesús Salva (Peru) Rubí Fernández	21–15, 21–14	(gold) Winner
2026	British & Irish Para Badminton International	Level 1	(India) Nithya Sre Sivan	(Indonesia) Subhan (Indonesia) Rina Marlina	19–21, 12–21	{{{1}}} Runner-up

=== International tournaments (from 2011–2021) (7 titles, 8 runners-up) ===
Men's singles SH6

Year	Tournament	Opponent	Score	Result
2019	Turkish Para Badminton International	(Hong Kong) Chu Man Kai	15–21, 13–21	(silver) Runner-up
2019	Uganda Para Badminton International	(India) Raja Magotra	20–22, 21–13, 21–19	(gold) Winner
2019	Irish Para Badminton International	(England) Krysten Coombs	21–16, 19–21, 8–21	(silver) Runner-up
2019	Thailand Para Badminton International	(Hong Kong) Chu Man Kai	21–17, 18–21, 21–17	(gold) Winner
2019	Denmark Para Badminton International	(England) Jack Shephard	17–21, 18–21	(silver) Runner-up
2020	Brazil Para Badminton International	(Brazil) Vitor Tavares	18–21, 19–21	(silver) Runner-up
2020	Peru Para Badminton International	(Brazil) Vitor Tavares	17–21, 21–14, 21–13	(gold) Winner

Men's doubles

Year	Tournament	Partner	Opponent	Score	Result
2019	Turkish Para Badminton International	(India) Raja Magotra	(Hong Kong) Chu Man Kai (Hong Kong) Wong Chun Yim	17–21, 15–21	(silver) Runner-up
2019	Dubai Para Badminton International	(India) Raja Magotra	(China) Lin Naili (China) Luo Guangliang	22–20, 21–13	(gold) Winner
2019	Thailand Para Badminton International	(India) Raja Magotra	(Hong Kong) Chu Man Kai (Hong Kong) Wong Chun Yim	12–21, 14–21	(silver) Runner-up

Mixed doubles

Year	Tournament	Partner	Opponent	Score	Result
2019	Turkish Para Badminton International	(Poland) Maria Bartusz	(Brazil) Vitor Tavares (Poland) Oliwia Szmigiel	21–19, 22–24, 16–21	(silver) Runner-up
2019	Irish Para Badminton International	(United States) Katherine Valli	(Scotland) Robert Laing (England) Rebecca Bedford	21–19, 21–18	(gold) Winner
2019 (Note: This tournament uses a round robin system.)	Denmark Para Badminton International	(Argentina) Micaela Delgado	(Canada) Wyatt Lightfoot (Ukraine) Nina Kozlova	21–16, 19–21, 21–17	(silver) Runner-up
2019	Denmark Para Badminton International	(Argentina) Micaela Delgado	(Russia) Alexander Mekhdiev (Poland) Oliwia Szmigiel	21–15, 21–16	(silver) Runner-up
2019	Denmark Para Badminton International	(Argentina) Micaela Delgado	(Scotland) Robert Laing (England) Rebecca Bedford	15–21, 8–21	(silver) Runner-up
2019	Denmark Para Badminton International	(Argentina) Micaela Delgado	(France) Charles Noakes (Denmark) Simone Meyer Larsen	18–21, 21–16, 21–16	(silver) Runner-up
2020 (Note: This tournament uses a round robin system.)	Brazil Para Badminton International	(Peru) Giuliana Póveda	(Chinese Taipei) Chen Yi-ying (Ukraine) Nina Kozlova	21–12, 21–14	(gold) Winner
2020	Brazil Para Badminton International	(Peru) Giuliana Póveda	(Brazil) Dheyvid Bisto (Argentina) Karina Loyola	21–10, 21–11	(gold) Winner
2020	Brazil Para Badminton International	(Peru) Giuliana Póveda	(Peru) Jesús Salva (Peru) Rubí Fernández	21–16, 21–17	(gold) Winner
2020	Brazil Para Badminton International	(Peru) Giuliana Póveda	(Brazil) Marcio Dellafina (Brazil) Yasmin Oliveira	21–3, 21–8	(gold) Winner
2020	Peru Para Badminton International	(Peru) Giuliana Póveda	(Peru) Jesús Salva (Peru) Rubí Fernández	21–12, 21–15	(gold) Winner

== Awards ==
- 2021 – Khel Ratna Award, highest sporting honour of India.
