= Badminton at the 2023 European Para Championships – Mixed doubles SH6 =

Badminton's mixed doubles SH6 at the 2023 European Para Championships
- Venue: Rotterdam Ahoy, Rotterdam
- Dates: 15 – 20 August
- Competitors: 14 from 5 nations

Medalists
gold medal	Jack Shephard; Rachel Choong	Great Britain
silver medal	Krysten Coombs; Oliwia Szmigiel	Mixed-NOCs
bronze medal	Charles Noakes; Elisa Bujnowskyj	France
bronze medal	Andrew Davies; Daria Bujnicka	Mixed-NOCs

The mixed doubles SH6 badminton tournament at the 2023 European Para Championships was played from 15 to 20 August 2023 in Rotterdam Ahoy, Rotterdam. A total of 7 pairs competed at the tournament, two of whom was seeded.

== Competition schedule ==
Play took place between 15 and 20 August.

GS	Group stage	R16	Round of 16	¼	Quarterfinals	½	Semifinals	F	Final

Events	Tue 15	Wed 16	Thu 17	Fri 18	Sat 19	Sun 20
Mixed doubles SH6	GS	GS	GS		½	F

== Seeds ==
The following players were seeded:

1. Jack Shephard / Rachel Choong (GBR) (champion; gold medalist)
2. Charles Noakes / Elisa Bujnowskyj (FRA) (semi-finals; bronze medalist)

== Group stage ==
=== Group A ===
Pos	Team	Pld	W	L	GF	GA	GD	PF	PA	PD	Qualification
1	Krysten Coombs (GBR) Oliwia Szmigiel (POL)	2	2	0	4	1	+3	98	66	+32	Qualification to elimination stage
2	Jack Shephard (GBR) Rachel Choong (GBR) [1]	2	1	1	3	2	+1	97	61	+36	Qualification to elimination stage
3	Maxime Greboval (FRA) Anastasiia Zavalii (UKR)	2	0	2	0	4	−4	16	84	−68	

Source: Group A – standings

Date		Score		Game 1	Game 2	Game 3
15 August	Maxime Greboval (France); Anastasiia Zavalii (Ukraine)	0–2	(United Kingdom) Krysten Coombs (Poland) Oliwia Szmigiel	3–21	8–21	
16 August	Jack Shephard (United Kingdom); Rachel Choong (United Kingdom)	2–0	(France) Maxime Greboval (Ukraine) Anastasiia Zavalii	21–2	21–3	
17 August	Jack Shephard (United Kingdom); Rachel Choong (United Kingdom)	1–2	(United Kingdom) Krysten Coombs (Poland) Oliwia Szmigiel	21–14	15–21	19–21

=== Group B ===
Pos	Team	Pld	W	L	GF	GA	GD	PF	PA	PD	Qualification
1	Andrew Davies (GBR) Daria Bujnicka (POL)	2	2	0	4	1	+3	106	98	+8	Qualification to elimination stage
2	Charles Noakes (FRA) Elisa Bujnowskyj (FRA) [2]	2	1	1	2	2	0	82	74	+8	Qualification to elimination stage
3	Iván Segura (ESP) Nina Kozlova (UKR)	2	0	2	1	4	−3	87	103	−16	
4	Isaac Maison (GBR) Anya Butterworth (GBR) (Z)	0	0	0	0	0	0	0	0	0	

Source: Group B – standings
(Z) Withdrew after second match.

Date		Score		Game 1	Game 2	Game 3
15 August	Andrew Davies (United Kingdom); Daria Bujnicka (Poland)	2–1	(Spain) Iván Segura (Ukraine) Nina Kozlova	23–21	17–21	21–16
15 August	Charles Noakes (France); Elisa Bujnowskyj (France)	~~2–0~~	(United Kingdom) Isaac Maison (United Kingdom) Anya Butterworth	~~21–14~~	~~21–14~~	
16 August	Iván Segura (Spain); Nina Kozlova (Ukraine)	~~0–2~~	(United Kingdom) Isaac Maison (United Kingdom) Anya Butterworth	~~19–21~~	~~11–21~~	
16 August	Charles Noakes (France); Elisa Bujnowskyj (France)	0–2	(United Kingdom) Andrew Davies (Poland) Daria Bujnicka	18–21	22–24	
17 August	Charles Noakes (France); Elisa Bujnowskyj (France)	2–0	(Spain) Iván Segura (Ukraine) Nina Kozlova	21–18	21–11	
17 August	Andrew Davies (United Kingdom); Daria Bujnicka (Poland)	Walkover	(United Kingdom) Isaac Maison (United Kingdom) Anya Butterworth	—		

== Elimination stage ==
Semi-finals
Krysten Coombs (GBR); Oliwia Szmigiel (POL)	21	21
2	Charles Noakes (FRA); Elisa Bujnowskyj (FRA)	12	19
1	Jack Shephard (GBR); Rachel Choong (GBR)	21	21
Andrew Davies (GBR); Daria Bujnicka (POL)	7	10

Final
Krysten Coombs (GBR); Oliwia Szmigiel (POL)	16	11
1	Jack Shephard (GBR); Rachel Choong (GBR)	21	21
