= Krysten Coombs =

English para badminton player

Krysten Coombs MBE
Personal information
- Born: 15 November 1990 (age 35) Brighton, England, United Kingdom
- Height: 1.36 m (4 ft 6 in)
- Weight: 51 kg (112 lb)

Sport
- Country: England
- Sport: Badminton

Men's singles and doubles SH6
- Highest ranking: 2 (MS 1 January 2019); 1 (MD with Jack Shephard 1 January 2019)
- Current ranking: 6 (MS); 8 (MD with Jack Shephard) (8 November 2022)
Medal record
Men's para-badminton
Representing United Kingdom
Paralympic Games
Bronze medal – third place	2020 Tokyo	Men's singles
Silver medal – second place	2024 Paris	Men's singles
European Para Championships
Silver medal – second place	2023 Rotterdam	Mixed doubles
Bronze medal – third place	2023 Rotterdam	Men's singles
Representing England
World Championships
Gold medal – first place	2015 Stoke Mandeville	Men's doubles
Silver medal – second place	2017 Ulsan	Men's singles
Silver medal – second place	2017 Ulsan	Men's doubles
Bronze medal – third place	2011 Guatemala City	Men's singles
Bronze medal – third place	2015 Stoke Mandeville	Men's singles
Bronze medal – third place	2022 Tokyo	Men's singles
European Championships
Gold medal – first place	2008 Dortmund	Mixed doubles
Gold medal – first place	2018 Rodez	Men's doubles
Silver medal – second place	2008 Dortmund	Men's doubles
Silver medal – second place	2010 Filzbach	Men's doubles
Silver medal – second place	2018 Rodez	Men's singles
Bronze medal – third place	2010 Filzbach	Men's singles
Bronze medal – third place	2012 Dortmund	Mixed doubles
Bronze medal – third place	2014 Murcia	Men's doubles

Krysten Michael Francis Coombs MBE (born 15 November 1990) is an English para badminton player who competes in international level events, he also competed in para table tennis nationally before switching to badminton. He competes alongside Jack Shephard in men's doubles events.

Coombs was also an actor who made a cameo appearance in Game of Thrones in a fourth season episode.

== Achievements ==
=== Paralympic Games ===
Men's singles SH6

Year	Venue	Opponent	Score	Result
2020	Yoyogi National Gymnasium, Tokyo, Japan	(Brazil) Vitor Tavares	21–12, 10–21, 21–16	Bronze
2024	Porte de La Chapelle Arena, Paris, France	(France) Charles Noakes	19–21, 13–21	Silver

=== World Championships ===
Men's singles SH6

Year	Venue	Opponent	Score	Result
2011 (Note: This tournament uses a round robin system.)	Coliseo Deportivo, Guatemala City, Guatemala	(Russia) Alexander Mekhdiev	15–21, 9–21	Bronze
2011	Coliseo Deportivo, Guatemala City, Guatemala	(Australia) Michael Blair	21–11, 21–15	Bronze
2011	Coliseo Deportivo, Guatemala City, Guatemala	(Australia) Dalton Ong	21–12, 21–12	Bronze
2011	Coliseo Deportivo, Guatemala City, Guatemala	(Republic of Ireland) Niall McVeigh	13–21, 16–21	Bronze
2015	Stoke Mandeville Stadium, Stoke Mandeville, England	(Malaysia) Didin Taresoh	14–21, 21–18, 11–21	Bronze
2017	Dongchun Gymnasium, Ulsan, South Korea	(England) Jack Shephard	21–10, 19–21, 21–23	Silver
2022	Yoyogi National Gymnasium, Tokyo, Japan	(Hong Kong) Chu Man Kai	5–21, 21–18, 9–21	Bronze

Men's doubles SH6

Year	Venue	Partner	Opponent	Score	Result
2015	Stoke Mandeville Stadium, Stoke Mandeville, England	(England) Jack Shephard	(England) Isaak Dalglish (England) Andrew Martin	21–11, 21–16	Gold
2017	Dongchun Gymnasium, Ulsan, South Korea	(England) Jack Shephard	(Hong Kong) Chu Man Kai (Hong Kong) Wong Chun Yim	19–21, 21–16, 16–21	Silver

=== European Para Championships ===
Men's singles SH6

Year	Venue	Opponent	Score	Result
2023	Rotterdam Ahoy, Rotterdam, Netherlands	(France) Charles Noakes	13–21, 6–21	Bronze

Mixed doubles SH6

Year	Venue	Partner	Opponent	Score	Result
2023	Rotterdam Ahoy, Rotterdam, Netherlands	(Poland) Oliwia Szmigiel	(United Kingdom) Jack Shephard (United Kingdom) Rachel Choong	16–21, 11–21	Silver

=== European Championships ===
Men's singles SH6

Year	Venue	Opponent	Score	Result
2010	Sportzentrum Kerenzerberg, Filzbach, Switzerland	(Republic of Ireland) Niall McVeigh	13–21, 15–21	Bronze
2018	Amphitheatre Gymnasium, Rodez, France	(England) Jack Shephard	21–17, 10–21, 12–21	Silver

Men's doubles

Year	Venue	Partner	Opponent	Score	Result
2008	Sporthallen TSC Eintracht Dortmund, Dortmund, Germany				Silver
2010	Sportzentrum Kerenzerberg, Filzbach, Switzerland	(Republic of Ireland) Niall McVeigh	(Republic of Ireland) Luke Irvine (Russia) Alexander Mekhdiev	21–17, 21–16	Silver
2010	Sportzentrum Kerenzerberg, Filzbach, Switzerland	(Republic of Ireland) Niall McVeigh	(England) Shaun Dunford (England) Jack Gambrill	21–13, 21–16	Silver
2010	Sportzentrum Kerenzerberg, Filzbach, Switzerland	(Republic of Ireland) Niall McVeigh	(England) Oliver Clarke (England) Andrew Martin	18–21, 13–21	Silver
2014	High Performance Center, Murcia, Spain	(England) Jack Shephard	(England) Isaak Dalglish (England) Andrew Martin	19–21, 18–21	Bronze
2014	High Performance Center, Murcia, Spain	(England) Jack Shephard	(Poland) Grzegorz Jednaki (Scotland) Robert Laing	21–17, 21–6	Bronze
2014	High Performance Center, Murcia, Spain	(England) Jack Shephard	(Republic of Ireland) Niall McVeigh (Russia) Alexander Mekhdiev	21–23, 21–15, 17–21	Bronze
2018	Amphitheatre Gymnasium, Rodez, France	(England) Jack Shephard	(Republic of Ireland) Andrew Moorcroft (Scotland) Robert Laing	21–6, 21–8	Gold
2018	Amphitheatre Gymnasium, Rodez, France	(England) Jack Shephard	(Russia) Alexander Mekhdiev (France) Fabien Morat	21–10, 21–11	Gold
2018	Amphitheatre Gymnasium, Rodez, France	(England) Jack Shephard	(Serbia) Milan Grahovac (Serbia) Đorđe Koprivica	21–3, 21–4	Gold
2018	Amphitheatre Gymnasium, Rodez, France	(England) Jack Shephard	(England) Isaak Dalglish (England) Andrew Martin	15–21, 21–10, 21–10	Gold

Mixed doubles

Year	Venue	Partner	Opponent	Score	Result
2008	Sporthallen TSC Eintracht Dortmund, Dortmund, Germany				Gold
2012	Helmut-Körnig-Halle, Dortmund, Germany	(England) Jennifer Greasley	(Russia) Alexander Mekhdiev (Germany) Anna Spindelndreier	16–21, 16–21	Bronze

=== International tournaments (from 2011–2021) (14 titles, 9 runners-up) ===
Men's singles SH6

Year	Tournament	Opponent	Score	Result
2015	Spanish Para Badminton International	(England) Andrew Martin	15–21, 21–9, 21–19	(gold) Winner
2017	Spanish Para Badminton International	(England) Jack Shephard	21–13, 22–20	(gold) Winner
2017	Irish Para Badminton International	(England) Jack Shephard	21–13, 21–13	(gold) Winner
2017	Japan Para Badminton International	(England) Jack Shephard	21–18, 21–23, 21–23	(silver) Runner-up
2018	Spanish Para Badminton International	(England) Jack Shephard	15–21, 19–21	(silver) Runner-up
2018	Irish Para Badminton International	(England) Jack Shephard	21–13, 19–21, 13–21	(silver) Runner-up
2018	Japan Para Badminton International	(England) Jack Shephard	11–21, 21–14, 19–21	(silver) Runner-up
2019	Irish Para Badminton International	(India) Krishna Nagar	16–21, 21–19, 21–8	(gold) Winner
2021	Spanish Para Badminton International	(England) Jack Shephard	23–21, 23–21	(gold) Winner

Men's doubles SH6

Year	Tournament	Partner	Opponent	Score	Result
2015	Spanish Para Badminton International	(England) Jack Shephard	(England) Isaak Dalglish (England) Andrew Martin	21–11, 21–9	(gold) Winner
2015	Spanish Para Badminton International	(England) Jack Shephard	(Poland) Grzegorz Jednaki (Netherlands) Sun-jong Lie	21–8, 21–8	(gold) Winner
2015	Spanish Para Badminton International	(England) Jack Shephard	(Scotland) Robert Laing (Hong Kong) Wong Chun Yim	21–14, 21–6	(gold) Winner
2016	Irish Para Badminton International	(England) Jack Shephard	(England) Oliver Clarke (England) Andrew Martin	21–4, 21–19	(gold) Winner
2018	Dubai Para Badminton International	(England) Jack Shephard	(Hong Kong) Chu Man Kai (Hong Kong) Wong Chun Yim	21–12, 21–16	(gold) Winner
2018	Irish Para Badminton International	(England) Jack Shephard	(Hong Kong) Chu Man Kai (Hong Kong) Wong Chun Yim	21–17, 21–11	(gold) Winner
2018	Thailand Para Badminton International	(England) Jack Shephard	(Hong Kong) Chu Man Kai (Hong Kong) Wong Chun Yim	14–21, 21–11, 21–16	(gold) Winner
2018	Japan Para Badminton International	(England) Jack Shephard	(South Korea) An Gyeong-min (Republic of Ireland) Andrew Moorcroft	21–3, 21–7	(gold) Winner
2018	Japan Para Badminton International	(England) Jack Shephard	(Thailand) Natthapong Meechai (Thailand) Bunthan Yaemmali	21–5, 21–11	(gold) Winner
2018	Japan Para Badminton International	(England) Jack Shephard	(Japan) Yohei Hatakeyama (France) Fabien Morat	21–7, 21–2	(gold) Winner
