= Para Badminton at the 2025 Asian Youth Para Games =

Asian Youth Para Games

Para badminton at the 2025 Asian Youth Para Games
- Venue: Dubai Club for People of Determination
- Location: Dubai, United Arab Emirates
- Dates: 10–13 December 2025

Para badminton events at the 2025 Asian Youth Para Games were held at the Dubai Club for People of Determination in Dubai, United Arab Emirates from 10 to 13 December 2025.

== Calendar ==
Date	Events
8–9 December	Classification of athletes
9 December	Official Training
10–12 December	Group Stages; Knockouts
12–13 December	Finals

== Medal tally ==
Rank	Nation	Gold	Silver	Bronze	Total
1	India	11	5	8	24
2	Malaysia	3	0	6	9
3	Chinese Taipei	2	2	1	5
4	Indonesia	1	6	6	13
5	South Korea	1	3	4	8
6	Iraq	0	1	0	1
6	Philippines	0	1	0	1
8	Bhutan	0	0	1	1
8	Singapore	0	0	1	1
8	Thailand	0	0	1	1
Totals (10 entries)		18	18	28	64

Badminton and table tennis doubles and mixed medals were counted as two.

== Results ==
=== Singles events ===
Event	Class	Gold	Silver	Bronze
Boys	WH1–WH2	Noh Yeong-hun; South Korea	Hasan Alderi; Iraq	Thantharathon Barisri; Thailand
Boys	WH1–WH2	Noh Yeong-hun; South Korea	Hasan Alderi; Iraq	Cheyang Kuenchap; Bhutan
Boys	SL3	Kartik Suhag; India	Vijender; India	Lee Seung-hu; South Korea
Boys	SL3	Kartik Suhag; India	Vijender; India	Jia Rui Felix Hu; Singapore
Boys	SL4	Afghanie Sakha Hindarsah; Indonesia	Abhijeet Sakhuja; India	Harshit Choudhary; India
Boys	SL4	Afghanie Sakha Hindarsah; Indonesia	Abhijeet Sakhuja; India	Kim Ji-seong; South Korea
Boys	SU5	Jatin Szad; India	Lee Jeong-soo; South Korea	Shivam Yadav; India
Boys	SU5	Jatin Szad; India	Lee Jeong-soo; South Korea	Nik Muhammad Hashraff Muazzam Bin Mohd Hilmin; Malaysia
Boys	SH6	Premchand Potnuru; India	Revandra Jemirah; Indonesia	Lin Jia-siang; Chinese Taipei
Boys	SH6	Premchand Potnuru; India	Revandra Jemirah; Indonesia	You Zhou Cheah; Malaysia
Girls	WH1			
Girls	WH2			
Girls	SL3	Siti Maisarah; Malaysia	Tulika Jadhao; India	Emilia As Syafa; Indonesia
Girls	SL4–SU5	Shanthiya Viswanathan; India	Rezky Shafi Fauziyah; Bahrain	Shivangi Pandey; India
Girls	SL4–SU5	Shanthiya Viswanathan; India	Rezky Shafi Fauziyah; Bahrain	Fannie Alicha Elisaveta; Bahrain
Girls	SH6	Nithya Sre Sivan; India	Wu Yu-yen; Chinese Taipei	Manisha Patel; India
Girls	SH6	Nithya Sre Sivan; India	Wu Yu-yen; Chinese Taipei	Apriliyana Sulistyawati; Indonesia

=== Doubles events ===
Event	Class	Gold	Silver	Bronze
Boys	SU5	India; Jatin Azad; Shivam Yadav	South Korea; Kim Gyeong-seo; Lee Jeong-soo	Indonesia; Hafiz Nur Alfarizi; Kenji Satria Pamungkas
Mixed	SH6	Chinese Taipei; Lin Jia-Siang; Wu Yu-yen	Indonesia; Revandra Jemirah; Apriliyana Sulistyawati	Malaysia; You Zhou Cheah; Gladys Grace Didin
Open	SH6	Malaysia; Ahmed Bin Abdul Rahim; You Zhou Cheah	Chinese Taipei; Lin Jia-Siang; Philippines; John Cyrus Maclang	India; Manisha Patel; Nithya Sre Sivan
