= Badminton at the 2023 European Para Championships – Men's singles SH6 =

Badminton's men's singles SH6 at the 2023 European Para Championships
- Venue: Rotterdam Ahoy, Rotterdam
- Dates: 15 – 20 August
- Competitors: 13 from 5 nations

Medalists
gold medal	Jack Shephard	Great Britain
silver medal	Charles Noakes	France
bronze medal	Isaac Maison	Great Britain
bronze medal	Krysten Coombs	Great Britain

The men's singles SH6 badminton tournament at the 2023 European Para Championships was played from 15 to 20 August 2023 in Rotterdam Ahoy, Rotterdam. A total of 13 players competed at the tournament, three of whom was seeded.

== Competition schedule ==
Play took place between 15 and 20 August.

GS	Group stage	¼	Quarterfinals	½	Semifinals	F	Final

Events	Tue 15	Wed 16	Thu 17	Fri 18	Sat 19	Sun 20
Men's singles SH6	GS	GS	GS	¼	½	F

== Seeds ==
The following players were seeded:

1. Jack Shephard (GBR) (champion; gold medalist)
2. Charles Noakes (FRA) (final; silver medalist)
3. Krysten Coombs (GBR) (semi-finals; bronze medalist)

== Group stage ==
=== Group A ===
Pos	Team	Pld	W	L	GF	GA	GD	PF	PA	PD	Qualification
1	Jack Shephard (GBR) [1]	2	2	0	4	0	+4	84	19	+65	Qualification to elimination stage
2	Maxime Greboval (FRA)	2	1	1	2	2	0	68	101	−33	Qualification to elimination stage
3	Iván Segura (ESP)	2	0	2	0	4	−4	63	95	−32	

Source: Group A – standings

Date		Score		Game 1	Game 2	Game 3
15 August	Jack Shephard (United Kingdom)	2–0	(Spain) Iván Segura	21–6	21–4	
16 August	Jack Shephard (United Kingdom)	2–0	(France) Maxime Greboval	21–6	21–3	
17 August	Iván Segura (Spain)	1–2	(France) Maxime Greboval	14–21	21–17	18–21

=== Group B ===
Pos	Team	Pld	W	L	GF	GA	GD	PF	PA	PD	Qualification
1	Charles Noakes (FRA) [2]	2	2	0	4	0	+4	84	36	+48	Qualification to elimination stage
2	Andrew Davies (GBR)	2	0	2	1	4	−3	73	109	−36	Qualification to elimination stage
3	Isaac Maison (GBR)	2	1	1	2	3	−1	83	95	−12	

Source: Group B – standings

Date		Score		Game 1	Game 2	Game 3
15 August	Charles Noakes (France)	2–0	(United Kingdom) Andrew Davies	21–8	21–12	
16 August	Charles Noakes (France)	2–0	(United Kingdom) Isaac Maison	21–10	21–6	
17 August	Andrew Davies (United Kingdom)	1–2	(United Kingdom) Isaac Maison	26–24	20–22	7–21

=== Group C ===
Pos	Team	Pld	W	L	GF	GA	GD	PF	PA	PD	Qualification
1	Krysten Coombs (GBR) [3]	3	3	0	6	0	+6	126	38	+88	Qualification to elimination stage
2	Fabien Morat (FRA)	3	2	1	4	3	+1	112	125	−13	Qualification to elimination stage
3	Đorđe Koprivica (SRB)	3	1	2	3	4	−1	109	117	−8	
4	Ali Altıparmak (TUR)	3	0	3	0	6	−6	59	126	−67	

Source: Group C – standings

Date		Score		Game 1	Game 2	Game 3
15 August	Krysten Coombs (United Kingdom)	2–0	(Serbia) Đorđe Koprivica	21–7	21–6	
15 August	Fabien Morat (France)	2–0	(Turkey) Ali Altıparmak	21–16	21–13	
16 August	Krysten Coombs (United Kingdom)	2–0	(France) Fabien Morat	21–6	21–9	
16 August	Đorđe Koprivica (Serbia)	2–0	(Turkey) Ali Altıparmak	21–12	21–8	
17 August	Đorđe Koprivica (Serbia)	1–2	(France) Fabien Morat	16–21	21–13	17–21
17 August	Krysten Coombs (United Kingdom)	2–0	(Turkey) Ali Altıparmak	21–6	21–4	

== Elimination stage ==
Quarter-finals
Fabien Morat (FRA)	11	9
Isaac Maison (GBR)	21	21
Maxime Greboval (FRA)	8	5
3	Krysten Coombs (GBR)	21	21

Semi-finals
1	Jack Shephard (GBR)	21	21
Isaac Maison (GBR)	7	7
3	Krysten Coombs (GBR)	13	6
2	Charles Noakes (FRA)	21	21

Final
1	Jack Shephard (GBR)	23	17	22
2	Charles Noakes (FRA)	21	21	20
