= Badminton at the 2024 Summer Paralympics – Women's singles SH6 =

Badminton competition

Women's singles SH6 at the XVII Paralympic Games
- Venue: Arena Porte de La Chapelle, Paris
- Dates: 29 August 2024 – 2 September 2024
- Competitors: 11 from 9 nations

Medalists
1st place, gold medalist(s)		Li Fengmei	China
2nd place, silver medalist(s)		Lin Shuangbao	China
3rd place, bronze medalist(s)		Nithya Sivan	India

The women's singles SH6 tournament at the 2024 Summer Paralympics in France will take place between 29 August and 2 September 2024 at Arena Porte de La Chapelle. The event was won by the unseeded Li Fengmei in an all-China final with compatriot Lin Shuangbao.

== Classification ==
- SH6
  Players in this class have short stature caused by achondroplasia or other genetic conditions.

== Seeds ==
These were the seeds for this event:

1. Nithya Sre Sivan (IND) (semifinals, bronze medalist)
2. Giuliana Póveda (PER) (group stage)
3. Rachel Choong (GBR) (quarterfinals)

== Group stage ==
The draw of the group stage revealed on 24 August 2024. The group stage will be played from 29 to 31 August. The top two winners of each group advanced to the knockout rounds.

=== Group A ===
Pos	Team	Pld	W	L	GF	GA	GD	PF	PA	PD	Pts	Qualification
1	Lin Shuangbao (CHN)	3	3	0	6	0	+6	127	72	+55	3	Semi-finals
2	Nithya Sre Sivan (IND)	3	2	1	4	2	+2	122	89	+33	2	Quarter-finals
3	Jayci Simon (USA)	3	1	2	2	4	−2	78	101	−23	1	
4	Cai Yi-lin (TPE)	3	0	3	0	6	−6	61	126	−65	0	

First match(es) will be played: 29 August 2024. Source: COJOP2024

Date	Time	Player 1	Score	Player 2	Set 1	Set 2	Set 3	Report
Aug 29	16:00	Nithya Sre Sivan (India)	2–0	(United States) Jayci Simon	21–7	21–8		
Aug 29	17:20	Lin Shuangbao (China)	2–0	(Chinese Taipei) Cai Yi-lin	21–7	21–6		
Aug 30	17:20	Nithya Sre Sivan (India)	2–0	(Chinese Taipei) Cai Yi-lin	21–12	21–19		
Aug 30	18:00	Jayci Simon (United States)	0–2	(China) Lin Shuangbao	9–21	12–21		
Aug 31		Nithya Sre Sivan (India)	0–2	(China) Lin Shuangbao	20–22	18–21		
Aug 31	18:40	Jayci Simon (United States)	2–0	(Chinese Taipei) Cai Yi-lin	21–9	21–8		

=== Group B ===
Pos	Team	Pld	W	L	GF	GA	GD	PF	PA	PD	Pts	Qualification
1	Rachel Choong (GBR)	2	2	0	4	2	+2	115	104	+11	2	Quarter-finals
2	Oliwia Szmigiel (POL)	2	1	1	3	2	+1	89	80	+9	1	Quarter-finals
3	Rubí Fernández (PER)	2	0	2	1	4	−3	78	98	−20	0	

First match(es) will be played: 29 August 2024. Source: COJOP2024

Date	Time	Player 1	Score	Player 2	Set 1	Set 2	Set 3	Report
Aug 29	18:00	Oliwia Szmigiel (Poland)	2–0	(Peru) Rubí Fernández	21–13	21–8		
Aug 30	18:00	Rachel Choong (United Kingdom)	2–0	(Peru) Rubí Fernández	14–21	21–19	21–17	
Aug 31		Rachel Choong (United Kingdom)	2–1	(Poland) Oliwia Szmigiel	17–21	21–10	21–16	

=== Group C ===
Pos	Team	Pld	W	L	GF	GA	GD	PF	PA	PD	Pts	Qualification
1	Li Fengmei (CHN)	3	3	0	6	0	+6	126	59	+67	3	Semi-finals
2	Rina Marlina (INA)	3	2	1	4	3	+1	129	114	+15	2	Quarter-finals
3	Giuliana Póveda (PER)	3	1	2	3	4	−1	117	125	−8	1	
4	Chai Saeyang (THA)	3	0	3	0	6	−6	52	126	−74	0	

First match(es) will be played: 29 August 2024. Source: COJOP2024

Date	Time	Player 1	Score	Player 2	Set 1	Set 2	Set 3	Report
Aug 29	16:40	Li Fengmei (China)	2–0	(Thailand) Chai Saeyang	21–5	21–5		
Aug 29	16:40	Giuliana Póveda (Peru)	1–2	(Indonesia) Rina Marlina	21–19	17–21	14–21	
Aug 30	18:40	Li Fengmei (China)	2–0	(Indonesia) Rina Marlina	21–10	21–16		
Aug 30	19:20	Giuliana Póveda (Peru)	2–0	(Thailand) Chai Saeyang	21–15	21–7		
Aug 31		Chai Saeyang (Thailand)	0–2	(Indonesia) Rina Marlina	8–21	12–21		
Aug 31		Giuliana Póveda (Peru)	0–2	(China) Li Fengmei	17–21	6–21		

== Finals ==
The knockout stage will be played from 1 and 3.

Quarter-finals
C2	Rina Marlina (INA)	21	21
B1	Rachel Choong (GBR)	7	11
B2	Oliwia Szmigiel (POL)	4	7
A2	Nithya Sre Sivan (IND)	21	21

Semi-finals
C1	Li Fengmei (CHN)	21	21
C2	Rina Marlina (INA)	8	4
A2	Nithya Sre Sivan (IND)	13	19
A1	Lin Shuangbao (CHN)	21	21

Gold medal match
C1	Li Fengmei (CHN) (gold)	21	21	-
A1	Lin Shuangbao (CHN) (silver)	14	17-
Bronze medal match
C2	Rina Marlina (INA)	14	6	-
A2	Nithya Sre Sivan (IND) (bronze)	21	21	-
