= Chu Man Kai =

Hong Kong para-badminton player (born 1990)

Personal information
- Born: 17 October 1990 (age 35) Hong Kong
- Height: 141 cm (4 ft 8 in)

Sport
- Country: Hong Kong
- Sport: Badminton

Men's singles and doubles SH6
- Highest ranking: 1 (MS 8 November 2022); 1 (MD with Wong Chun Yim 16 May 2019); 4 (XD with Choi Wing Kei 13 June 2023)
- Current ranking: 1 (MS); 2 (MD with Wong Chun Yim); 8 (XD with Choi Wing Kei) (3 September 2024)
Medal record
Men's para-badminton
Representing Hong Kong
Paralympic Games
Silver medal – second place	2020 Tokyo	Men's singles
World Championships
Gold medal – first place	2017 Ulsan	Men's doubles
Gold medal – first place	2019 Basel	Men's doubles
Gold medal – first place	2022 Tokyo	Men's singles
Silver medal – second place	2024 Pattaya	Men's doubles
Bronze medal – third place	2022 Tokyo	Men's doubles
Bronze medal – third place	2026 Manama	Men's doubles
Asian Para Games
Gold medal – first place	2018 Jakarta	Men's singles
Gold medal – first place	2022 Hangzhou	Men's singles
Silver medal – second place	2022 Hangzhou	Men's doubles

Chu Man-kai (Chinese: 朱文佳; born 17 October 1990) is a Hong Kong para-badminton player. He started playing for Hong Kong in the international competition in 2017. He was unable to grow taller due to a recessive genetic disease. At the 2018 Asian Para Games, he won a gold medal in the singles SS6 event. At the 2020 Summer Paralympics, he won a silver medal in the singles SH6 event.

== Achievements ==
=== Paralympic Games ===
Men's singles SH6

Year	Venue	Opponent	Score	Result
2020	Yoyogi National Gymnasium, Tokyo, Japan	(India) Krishna Nagar	17–21, 21–16, 17–21	Silver

=== World Championships ===
Men's singles SH6

Year	Venue	Opponent	Score	Result
2022	Yoyogi National Gymnasium, Tokyo, Japan	(England) Jack Shephard	22–20, 13–21, 22–20	Gold

Men’s doubles SH6

Year	Venue	Partner	Opponent	Score	Result
2017	Dongchun Gymnasium, Ulsan, South Korea	(Hong Kong) Wong Chun Yim	(England) Krysten Coombs (England) Jack Shephard	21–19, 16–21, 21–16	Gold
2019	St. Jakobshalle, Basel, Switzerland	(Hong Kong) Wong Chun Yim	(India) Krishna Nagar (India) Raja Magotra	21–15, 17–21, 21–18	Gold
2022	Yoyogi National Gymnasium, Tokyo, Japan	(Hong Kong) Wong Chun Yim	(South Korea) Lee Dae-sung (Thailand) Natthapong Meechai	16–21, 17–21	Bronze
2024	Pattaya Exhibition and Convention Hall, Pattaya, Thailand	(Hong Kong) Wong Chun Yim	(China) Lin Naili (China) Zeng Qingtao	16–21, 23–21, 17–21	Silver

=== Asian Para Games ===
Men's singles SH6

Year	Venue	Opponent	Score	Result
2018	Istora Gelora Bung Karno, Jakarta, Indonesia	(Malaysia) Didin Taresoh	21–13, 21–17	Gold
2022	Binjiang Gymnasium, Guangzhou, China	(India) Krishna Nagar	21–10, 8–21, 21–11	Gold

Men's doubles SH6

Year	Venue	Partner	Opponent	Score	Result
2022	Binjiang Gymnasium, Guangzhou, China	(Hong Kong) Wong Chun Yim	(China) Lin Naili (China) Zeng Qingtao	14–21, 8–21	Silver

=== BWF Para Badminton World Circuit (7 titles, 4 runners-up) ===
The BWF Para Badminton World Circuit – Grade 2, Level 1, 2 and 3 tournaments has been sanctioned by the Badminton World Federation from 2022.

Men's singles SH6

Year	Tournament	Level	Opponent	Score	Result
2022	Bahrain Para Badminton International	Level 2	(England) Jack Shephard	21–19, 21–17	(gold) Winner
2022	Dubai Para Badminton International	Level 2	(Indonesia) Subhan	21–10, 21–9	(gold) Winner
2022	4 Nations Para Badminton International	Level 1	(England) Jack Shephard	21–11, 21–13	(gold) Winner
2022	Thailand Para Badminton International	Level 1	(France) Charles Noakes	23–21, 21–15	(gold) Winner
2023	Spanish Para Badminton International II	Level 2	(Thailand) Natthapong Meechai	21–9, 21–14	(gold) Winner
2023	Brazil Para Badminton International	Level 2	(Brazil) Vitor Tavares	20–22, 21–12, 21–11	(gold) Winner
2023	Thailand Para Badminton International	Level 2	(United States) Miles Krajewski	21–12, 21–8	(gold) Winner
2023	Bahrain Para Badminton International	Level 2	(India) Krishna Nagar	21–14, 21–19	(gold) Winner
2023	Japan Para Badminton International	Level 2	(Thailand) Natthapong Meechai	21–17, 6–21, 19–21	(silver) Runner-up
2023	Dubai Para Badminton International	Level 1	(France) Charles Noakes	24–26, 21–16, 21–12	(gold) Winner
2024	Spanish Para Badminton International II	Level 2	(France) Charles Noakes	21–16, 11–6 retired	(gold) Winner
2024	Spanish Para Badminton International I	Level 1	(Brazil) Vitor Tavares	21–18, 21–14	(gold) Winner
2024	Bahrain Para Badminton International	Level 2	(England) Jack Shephard	24–22, 21–5	(gold) Winner
2024	4 Nations Para Badminton International	Level 1	(India) Krishna Nagar	21–14, 17–21, 21–19	(gold) Winner

Men's doubles SH6

Year	Tournament	Level	Partner	Opponent	Score	Result
2022	Bahrain Para Badminton International	Level 2	(Hong Kong) Wong Chun Yim	(India) Dhinagaran Pandurangan (India) Sivarajan Solaimalai	21–12, 10–21 retired	(silver) Runner-up
2022 (Note: This tournament uses a round robin system.)	Dubai Para Badminton International	Level 2	(Hong Kong) Wong Chun Yim	(Republic of Ireland) Niall McVeigh (Indonesia) Subhan	21–15, 21–9	(silver) Runner-up
2022	Dubai Para Badminton International	Level 2	(Hong Kong) Wong Chun Yim	(South Korea) Lee Dae-sung (Thailand) Natthapong Meechai	17–21, 19–21	(silver) Runner-up
2022	Dubai Para Badminton International	Level 2	(Hong Kong) Wong Chun Yim	(India) Sudarsan Muthusamy (Peru) Héctor Salva	21–2, 21–7	(silver) Runner-up
2022	Dubai Para Badminton International	Level 2	(Hong Kong) Wong Chun Yim	(India) Dhinagaran Pandurangan (India) Sivarajan Solaimalai	21–13, 21–13	(silver) Runner-up
2022	Thailand Para Badminton International	Level 1	(Hong Kong) Wong Chun Yim	(India) Dhinagaran Pandurangan (India) Sivarajan Solaimalai	21–6, 21–6	(gold) Winner
2022	Thailand Para Badminton International	Level 1	(Hong Kong) Wong Chun Yim	(France) Fabien Morat (France) Charles Noakes	21–12, 21–10	(gold) Winner
2022	Thailand Para Badminton International	Level 1	(Hong Kong) Wong Chun Yim	(Thailand) Natthapong Meechai (Thailand) Bunthan Yaemmali	21–11, 21–17	(gold) Winner
2022	Bahrain Para Badminton International	Level 2	(Hong Kong) Wong Chun Yim	(India) Dhinagaran Pandurangan (India) Sivarajan Solaimalai	21–12, 10–21 retired	(silver) Runner-up
2023	Western Australia Para Badminton International	Level 2	(Hong Kong) Wong Chun Yim	(Singapore) Xavier Lim (Spain) Iván Segura	Walkover	(gold) Winner
2023	Western Australia Para Badminton International	Level 2	(Hong Kong) Wong Chun Yim	(Peru) Nilton Quispe (Peru) Héctor Salva	21–4, 21–7	(gold) Winner
2023	Western Australia Para Badminton International	Level 2	(Hong Kong) Wong Chun Yim	(India) Sudarsan Muthusamy (India) Dhinagaran Pandurangan	21–8, 21–11	(gold) Winner

Mixed doubles SH6

Year	Tournament	Level	Partner	Opponent	Score	Result
2022	Bahrain Para Badminton International	Level 2	(Hong Kong) Choi Wing Kei	(England) Jack Shephard (England) Rachel Choong	10–21, 6–21	(silver) Runner-up
2023	Brazil Para Badminton International	Level 2	(Hong Kong) Choi Wing Kei	(India) Sivarajan Solaimalai (India) Nithya Sre Sumathy Sivan	11–21, 17–21	(silver) Runner-up
2023	Western Australia Para Badminton International	Level 2	(Hong Kong) Choi Wing Kei	(Indonesia) Subhan (Indonesia) Rina Marlina	6–21, 13–21	(silver) Runner-up

=== International tournaments (from 2011–2021) (11 titles, 7 runners-up) ===
Men's singles SH6

Year	Tournament	Opponent	Score	Result
2017	Thailand Para Badminton International	(Hong Kong) Wong Chun Yim	15–21, 21–11, 19–21	(silver) Runner-up
2018	Australia Para Badminton International	(Hong Kong) Wong Chun Yim	21–11, 15–21, 14–21	(silver) Runner-up
2019	Turkish Para Badminton International	(India) Krishna Nagar	21–15, 21–13	(gold) Winner
2019	Canada Para Badminton International	(England) Jack Shephard	21–16, 19–21, 17–21	(silver) Runner-up
2019	Thailand Para Badminton International	(India) Krishna Nagar	17–21, 21–18, 17–21	(silver) Runner-up
2019	China Para Badminton International	(England) Krysten Coombs	21–7, 21–16	(gold) Winner

Men's doubles SH6

Year	Tournament	Partner	Opponent	Score	Result
2017	Irish Para Badminton International	(Hong Kong) Wong Chun Yim	(England) Krysten Coombs (England) Jack Shephard	16–21, 21–18, 21–10	(gold) Winner
2017	Thailand Para Badminton International	(Hong Kong) Wong Chun Yim	(India) Mark Joseph Dharmai (India) Sunil Pradhan	21–4, 21–10	(gold) Winner
2017	Thailand Para Badminton International	(Hong Kong) Wong Chun Yim	(Thailand) Bunthan Yaemmali (Thailand) Sayatorn Chatsrijurarat	21–9, 21–7	(gold) Winner
2017	Thailand Para Badminton International	(Hong Kong) Wong Chun Yim	(Japan) Yohei Hatakeyama (Australia) Luke Missen	21–5, 21–5	(gold) Winner
2018	Spanish Para Badminton International	(Hong Kong) Wong Chun Yim	(England) Krysten Coombs (England) Jack Shephard	18–21, 10–21	(silver) Runner-up
2018	Dubai Para Badminton International	(Hong Kong) Wong Chun Yim	(England) Krysten Coombs (England) Jack Shephard	12–21, 16–21	(silver) Runner-up
2018	Irish Para Badminton International	(Hong Kong) Wong Chun Yim	(England) Krysten Coombs (England) Jack Shephard	17–21, 11–21	(gold) Winner
2018	Thailand Para Badminton International	(Hong Kong) Wong Chun Yim	(England) Krysten Coombs (England) Jack Shephard	21–14, 11–21, 16–21	(silver) Runner-up
2018	Australia Para Badminton International	(Hong Kong) Wong Chun Yim	(Australia) Kobie Jane Donovan (Australia) Anthony Koedyk	21–1, 21–3	(gold) Winner
2018	Australia Para Badminton International	(Hong Kong) Wong Chun Yim	(Japan) Yohei Hatakeyama (United States) Miles Krajewski	21–7, 21–7	(gold) Winner
2018	Australia Para Badminton International	(Hong Kong) Wong Chun Yim	(Australia) Luke Missen (England) Jonathan Pratt	21–3, 21–6	(gold) Winner
2019	Turkish Para Badminton International	(Hong Kong) Wong Chun Yim	(India) Krishna Nagar (India) Raja Magotra	21–17, 21–15	(gold) Winner
2019	Canada Para Badminton International	(Hong Kong) Wong Chun Yim	(England) Andrew Martin (France) Fabien Morat	21–17, 21–6	(gold) Winner
2019	Irish Para Badminton International	(Hong Kong) Wong Chun Yim	(England) Isaak Dalglish (Republic of Ireland) Niall McVeigh	21–12, 21–13	(gold) Winner
2019	Thailand Para Badminton International	(Hong Kong) Wong Chun Yim	(India) Krishna Nagar (India) Raja Magotra	21–12, 21–14	(gold) Winner
2019	China Para Badminton International	(Hong Kong) Wong Chun Yim	(Chinese Taipei) Chen Yi-ying (Republic of Ireland) Niall McVeigh	21–4, 21–6	(gold) Winner
2019	China Para Badminton International	(Hong Kong) Wong Chun Yim	(France) Fabien Morat (Thailand) Bunthan Yaemmali	21–4, 21–7	(gold) Winner
2019	China Para Badminton International	(Hong Kong) Wong Chun Yim	(Indonesia) Dimas Tri Aji (Indonesia) Pahri	21–3, 21–5	(gold) Winner
2019	China Para Badminton International	(Hong Kong) Wong Chun Yim	(China) Lin Naili (China) Luo Guangliang	21–11, 21–6	(gold) Winner
