= Charles Noakes =

French para-badminton player

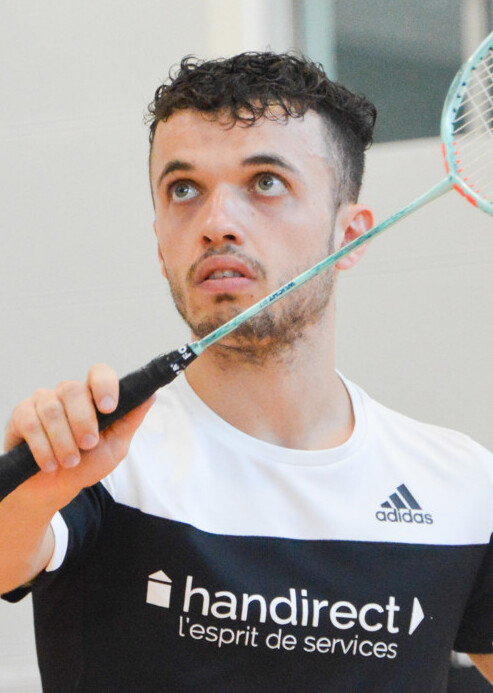
- Noakes in 2021

Personal information
- Born: 19 August 1997 (age 28) Sidcup, England
- Height: 1.45 m (4 ft 9 in)

Sport
- Country: France
- Sport: Badminton
- Handedness: Right

Men's singles and doubles SH6
- Highest ranking: 3 (MS 24 April 2024); 1 (MD with Fabien Morat 10 November 2022); 10 (XD with Elisa Bujnowskyj 21 August 2023)
- Current ranking: 3 (MS); 11 (MD with Lee Dae-sung); 12 (XD with Elisa Bujnowskyj) (3 September 2024)
Medal record
Para-badminton
Representing France
Paralympic Games
Gold medal – first place	2024 Paris	Men's singles
European Para Championships
Silver medal – second place	2023 Rotterdam	Men's singles

Charles Noakes (born 19 August 1997) is a French para-badminton player. He competed at the 2024 Summer Paralympics, where he reached the finals of the men's singles SH6 event and won gold after defeating Krysten Coombs of Great Britain.

== Achievements ==
=== Paralympic Games ===
Men's singles SH6

Year	Venue	Opponent	Score	Result
2024	Porte de La Chapelle Arena, Paris, France	(United Kingdom) Krysten Coombs	21–19, 21–13	Gold

=== European Para Championships ===
Men's singles SH6

Year	Venue	Opponent	Score	Result
2023	Rotterdam Ahoy, Rotterdam, Netherlands	(United Kingdom) Jack Shephard	21–23, 21–17, 20–22	Silver

=== BWF Para Badminton World Circuit (3 titles, 6 runners-up) ===
The BWF Para Badminton World Circuit – Grade 2, Level 1, 2 and 3 tournaments has been sanctioned by the Badminton World Federation from 2022.

Men's singles SL4

Year	Tournament	Level	Opponent	Score	Result
2022	Brazil Para-Badminton International	Level 2	(Brazil) Vitor Tavares	21–15, 16–21, 19–21	(silver) Runner-up
2022	Thailand Para Badminton International	Level 1	(Hong Kong) Chu Man Kai	21–23, 15–21	(silver) Runner-up
2023	Spanish Para Badminton International I	Level 1	(Brazil) Vitor Tavares	22–20, 19–21, 10–21	(silver) Runner-up
2023	Dubai Para Badminton International	Level 1	(Hong Kong) Chu Man Kai	26–24, 16–21, 12–21	(silver) Runner-up
2024	Spanish Para Badminton International II	Level 2	(Hong Kong) Chu Man Kai	16–21, 6–11 retired	(silver) Runner-up

Men's doubles SH6

Year	Tournament	Level	Partner	Opponent	Score	Result
2022	Spanish Para Badminton International II	Level 2	(France) Fabien Morat	(India) Dhinagaran Pandurangan (India) Sivarajan Solaimalai	16–21, 22–20, 21–15	(gold) Winner
2022	Brazil Para-Badminton International	Level 2	(France) Fabien Morat	(Peru) Nilton Quispe (Peru) Héctor Salva	21–12, 21–15	(gold) Winner
2022	Canada Para Badminton International	Level 1	(France) Fabien Morat	(Canada) Justin Kendrick (Canada) Wyatt Lightfoot	21–10, 21–14	(gold) Winner
2022	Thailand Para Badminton International	Level 1	(France) Fabien Morat	(Thailand) Natthapong Meechai (Thailand) Bunthan Yaemmali	19–21, 21–17, 21–16	(silver) Runner-up
2022	Thailand Para Badminton International	Level 1	(France) Fabien Morat	(Hong Kong) Chu Man Kai (Hong Kong) Wong Chun Yim	12–21, 10–21	(silver) Runner-up
2022	Thailand Para Badminton International	Level 1	(France) Fabien Morat	(India) Dhinagaran Pandurangan (India) Sivarajan Solaimalai	22–20, 21–15	(silver) Runner-up

=== International tournaments (from 2011–2021) (1 title, 2 runners-up) ===
Men's doubles SH6

Year	Tournament	Partner	Opponent	Score	Result
2020	Brazil Para Badminton International	(France) Fabien Morat	(China) Lin Naili (China) Luo Guangliang	20–22, 22–20, 19–21	(silver) Runner-up
2020	Brazil Para Badminton International	(France) Fabien Morat	(Brazil) Dheyvid Bisto (Brazil) Márcio Dellafina	21–5, 21–3	(silver) Runner-up
2020	Brazil Para Badminton International	(France) Fabien Morat	(United States) Miles Krajewski (Peru) Héctor Salva	21–19, 21–19	(silver) Runner-up
2020	Peru Para Badminton International	(France) Fabien Morat	(United States) Miles Krajewski (Peru) Héctor Salva	22–20, 21–10	(gold) Winner

Mixed doubles SL3–SU5

Year	Tournament	Partner	Opponent	Score	Result
2021	Spanish Para Badminton International	(Ukraine) Nina Kozlova	(Peru) Héctor Salva (Poland) Daria Bujnicka	21–17, 21–14	(silver) Runner-up
2021	Spanish Para Badminton International	(Ukraine) Nina Kozlova	(Russia) Alexander Mekhdiev (Russia) Uliana Podpalnaya	21–8, 21–17	(silver) Runner-up
2021	Spanish Para Badminton International	(Ukraine) Nina Kozlova	(France) Fabien Morat (Poland) Oliwia Szmigiel	16–21, 10–21	(silver) Runner-up
