= Badminton at the 2020 Summer Paralympics – Men's singles SH6 =

Men's singles SH6 at the XVI Paralympic Games
- Venue: Yoyogi National Gymnasium
- Dates: 2–5 September 2021
- Competitors: 6 from 5 nations

Medalists
1st place, gold medalist(s)		Krishna Nagar	India
2nd place, silver medalist(s)		Chu Man Kai	Hong Kong
3rd place, bronze medalist(s)		Krysten Coombs	Great Britain

The men's singles SH6 tournament at the 2020 Summer Paralympics in Tokyo took place between 2 and 5 September 2021 at Yoyogi National Gymnasium.

== Seeds ==
These were the seeds for this event:

1. Jack Shephard (GBR) (group stage)
2. Krishna Nagar (IND) (gold medalist)

== Group stage ==
The draw of the group stage revealed on 26 August 2021. The group stage was played from 2 to 3 September. The top two winners of each group advanced to the knockout rounds.

=== Group A ===
Pos	Team	Pld	W	L	GF	GA	GD	PF	PA	PD	Pts	Qualification
1	Chu Man Kai (HKG)	2	1	1	3	2	+1	87	89	−2	1	Advance to semi-finals
2	Krysten Coombs (GBR)	2	1	1	2	2	0	67	64	+3	1	Advance to semi-finals
3	Jack Shephard (GBR)	2	1	1	2	3	−1	86	87	−1	1	

Source: TOCOG

Date	Time	Player 1	Score	Player 2	Set 1	Set 2	Set 3
2 Sep	13:00	Jack Shephard (United Kingdom)	0–2	(United Kingdom) Krysten Coombs	12–21	10–21	
2 Sep	17:20	Chu Man Kai (Hong Kong)	2–0	(United Kingdom) Krysten Coombs	21–15	21–10	
3 Sep	15:20	Jack Shephard (United Kingdom)	2–1	(Hong Kong) Chu Man Kai	21–11	22–24	21–10

=== Group B ===
Pos	Team	Pld	W	L	GF	GA	GD	PF	PA	PD	Pts	Qualification
1	Krishna Nagar (IND)	1	1	0	2	0	+2	42	31	+11	1	Advance to semi-finals
2	Vitor Gonçalves Tavares (BRA)	1	0	1	0	2	−2	31	42	−11	0	Advance to semi-finals
3	Didin Taresoh (MAS)	0	0	0	0	0	0	0	0	0	0	Retired

Source: TOCOG

Date	Time	Player 1	Score	Player 2	Set 1	Set 2	Set 3
2 Sep	13:00	Krishna Nagar (India)	2–0	(Malaysia) Didin Taresoh	22–20	21–10	
2 Sep	17:20	Vitor Gonçalves Tavares (Brazil)	Retired	(Malaysia) Didin Taresoh	21–13	18–13^{r}	
3 Sep	15:20	Krishna Nagar (India)	2–0	(Brazil) Vitor Gonçalves Tavares	21–17	21–14	

== Finals ==
The knockout stage was played from 4 to 5 September.

Semi-finals
A1	Chu Man Kai (HKG)	15	21	21
B2	Vitor Gonçalves Tavares (BRA)	21	18	10
A2	Krysten Coombs (GBR)	10	11
B1	Krishna Nagar (IND)	21	21

Gold medal match
A1	Chu Man Kai (HKG) (silver)	17	21	17
B1	Krishna Nagar (IND) (gold)	21	16	21
Bronze medal match
B2	Vitor Gonçalves Tavares (BRA)	21	10	16
A2	Krysten Coombs (GBR) (bronze)	12	21	21
