= Badminton at the 2022 Asian Para Games =

Badminton championships

- Venue: Binjiang Gymnasium
- Location: Hangzhou, China
- Dates: 20–27 October 2023
- Competitors: 185 from 25 nations

Badminton tournament at the 2022 Asian Para Games was held at Binjiang Gymnasium, Hangzhou, China from 20 to 27 October 2023. The badminton programme in 2022 included men's and women's singles competitions; men's, women's and mixed doubles competitions.

== Classification ==
The players were classified to six different classes as per the Badminton World Federation.

== Nations ==
1. Bangladesh (2)
2. Bhutan (1)
3. Cambodia (1)
4. China (25)
5. Hong Kong (7)
6. India (30)
7. Indonesia (19)
8. Iraq (4)
9. Japan (15)
10. South Korea (14)
11. Lebanon (1)
12. Malaysia (7)
13. Maldives (3)
14. Mongolia (2)
15. Nepal (2)
16. Pakistan (4)
17. Philippines (2)
18. Singapore (2)
19. Sri Lanka (1)
20. Syria (4)
21. Chinese Taipei (11)
22. Tajikistan (1)
23. Thailand (18)
24. United Arab Emirates (2)
25. Vietnam (6)

== Medal table ==
* Host nation (China)

Rank	Nation	Gold	Silver	Bronze	Total
1	China (CHN)*	10	4	7	21
2	Indonesia (INA)	5	5	4	14
3	India (IND)	4	4	13	21
4	Japan (JPN)	2	1	2	5
5	Hong Kong (HKG)	1	1	2	4
6	South Korea (KOR)	0	3	5	8
7	Malaysia (MAS)	0	2	2	4
8	Thailand (THA)	0	1	4	5
9	Chinese Taipei (TPE)	0	1	3	4
Totals (9 entries)		22	22	42	86

== Medalists ==
=== Men ===
Event	Class	Gold	Silver	Bronze
Singles	WH1	Qu Zimo; China	Choi Jung-man; South Korea	Yang Tong; China
Singles	WH1	Qu Zimo; China	Choi Jung-man; South Korea	Muhammad Ikhwan Ramli; Malaysia
Singles	WH2	Daiki Kajiwara; Japan	Yu Soo-young; South Korea	Chan Ho Yuen; Hong Kong
Singles	WH2	Daiki Kajiwara; Japan	Yu Soo-young; South Korea	Kim Jung-jun; South Korea
Singles	SL3	Pramod Bhagat; India	Kumar Nitesh; India	Mongkhon Bunsun; Thailand
Singles	SL3	Pramod Bhagat; India	Kumar Nitesh; India	Daisuke Fujihara; Japan
Singles	SL4	Suhas Lalinakere Yathiraj; India	Mohd Amin Burhanuddin; Malaysia	Fredy Setiawan; Indonesia
Singles	SL4	Suhas Lalinakere Yathiraj; India	Mohd Amin Burhanuddin; Malaysia	Sukant Kadam; India
Singles	SU5	Dheva Anrimusthi; Indonesia	Cheah Liek Hou; Malaysia	Fang Jen-yu; Chinese Taipei
Singles	SU5	Dheva Anrimusthi; Indonesia	Cheah Liek Hou; Malaysia	Suryo Nugroho; Indonesia
Singles	SH6	Chu Man Kai; Hong Kong	Krishna Nagar; India	Wong Chun Yim; Hong Kong
Singles	SH6	Chu Man Kai; Hong Kong	Krishna Nagar; India	Lin Naili; China
Doubles	WH1–WH2	China (CHN); Mai Jianpeng; Qu Zimo	South Korea (KOR); Choi Jung-man; Kim Jung-jun	China (CHN); Yang Tong; Zhao Xin
Doubles	WH1–WH2	China (CHN); Mai Jianpeng; Qu Zimo	South Korea (KOR); Choi Jung-man; Kim Jung-jun	South Korea (KOR); Lee Sam-seop; Yu Soo-young
Doubles	SL3–SL4	India (IND); Kumar Nitesh; Tarun Dhillon	Indonesia (INA); Dwiyoko; Fredy Setiawan	India (IND); Pramod Bhagat; Sukant Kadam
Doubles	SL3–SL4	India (IND); Kumar Nitesh; Tarun Dhillon	Indonesia (INA); Dwiyoko; Fredy Setiawan	South Korea (KOR); Joo Dong-jae; Shin Kyung-hwan
Doubles	SU5	Indonesia (INA); Dheva Anrimusthi; Hafizh Briliansyah	India (IND); Chirag Baretha; Raj Kumar	Chinese Taipei (TPE); Fang Jen-yu; Pu Gui-yu
Doubles	SU5	Indonesia (INA); Dheva Anrimusthi; Hafizh Briliansyah	India (IND); Chirag Baretha; Raj Kumar	Malaysia (MAS); Muhammad Fareez Anuar; Cheah Liek Hou
Doubles	SH6	China (CHN); Lin Naili; Zeng Qingtao	Hong Kong (HKG); Chu Man Kai; Wong Chun Yim	India (IND); Krishna Nagar; Sivarajan Solaimalai
Doubles	SH6	China (CHN); Lin Naili; Zeng Qingtao	Hong Kong (HKG); Chu Man Kai; Wong Chun Yim	Indonesia (INA); Dimas Tri Aji; Subhan

=== Women ===
Event	Class	Gold	Silver	Bronze
Singles	WH1	Sarina Satomi; Japan	Sujirat Pookkham; Thailand	Yin Menglu; China
Singles	WH1	Sarina Satomi; Japan	Sujirat Pookkham; Thailand	Fan Chaoyue; China
Singles	WH2	Liu Yutong; China	Li Hongyan; China	Jung Gyeo-ul; South Korea
Singles	WH2	Liu Yutong; China	Li Hongyan; China	Amnouy Wetwithan; Thailand
Singles	SL3	Xiao Zuxian; China	Qonitah Ikhtiar Syakuroh; Indonesia	Manasi Girishchandra Joshi; India
Singles	SL3	Xiao Zuxian; China	Qonitah Ikhtiar Syakuroh; Indonesia	Mandeep Kaur; India
Singles	SL4	Cheng Hefang; China	Leani Ratri Oktila; Indonesia	Vaishnavi Puneyani; India
Singles	SL4	Cheng Hefang; China	Leani Ratri Oktila; Indonesia	Khalimatus Sadiyah; Indonesia
Singles	SU5	Thulasimathi Murugesan; India	Yang Qiuxia; China	Mamiko Toyoda; Japan
Singles	SU5	Thulasimathi Murugesan; India	Yang Qiuxia; China	Manisha Ramadass; India
Singles	SH6	Li Fengmei; China	Rina Marlina; Indonesia	Nithya Sre Sivan; India
Singles	SH6	Li Fengmei; China	Rina Marlina; Indonesia	Wu Yu-yen; Chinese Taipei
Doubles	WH1–WH2	China (CHN); Liu Yutong; Yin Menglu	Japan (JPN); Sarina Satomi; Yuma Yamazaki	Thailand (THA); Sujirat Pookkham; Amnouy Wetwithan
Doubles	SL3–SU5	Indonesia (INA); Leani Ratri Oktila; Khalimatus Sadiyah	India (IND); Manasi Girishchandra Joshi; Thulasimathi Murugesan	China (CHN); Xiao Zuxian; Yang Qiuxia
Doubles	SL3–SU5	Indonesia (INA); Leani Ratri Oktila; Khalimatus Sadiyah	India (IND); Manasi Girishchandra Joshi; Thulasimathi Murugesan	India (IND); Mandeep Kaur; Manisha Ramadass
Doubles	SH6	China (CHN); Li Fengmei; Lin Shuangbao	Chinese Taipei (TPE); Cai Yi-lin; Wu Yu-yen	India (IND); Rachana Patel; Nithya Sre Sivan

=== Mixed ===
Event	Class	Gold	Silver	Bronze
Doubles	WH1–WH2	China (CHN); Qu Zimo; Liu Yutong	China (CHN); Yang Tong; Li Hongyan	South Korea (KOR); Yu Yoo-young; Kwon Hyun-ah
Doubles	WH1–WH2	China (CHN); Qu Zimo; Liu Yutong	China (CHN); Yang Tong; Li Hongyan	Thailand (THA); Jakarin Homhual; Amnouy Wetwithan
Doubles	SL3–SU5	Indonesia (INA); Hikmat Ramdani; Leani Ratri Oktila	Indonesia (INA); Fredy Setiawan; Khalimatus Sadiyah	India (IND); Pramod Bhagat; Manisha Ramadass
Doubles	SL3–SU5	Indonesia (INA); Hikmat Ramdani; Leani Ratri Oktila	Indonesia (INA); Fredy Setiawan; Khalimatus Sadiyah	India (IND); Kumar Nitesh; Thulasimathi Murugesan
Doubles	SH6	Indonesia (INA); Subhan; Rina Marlina	China (CHN); Zeng Qingtao; Lin Shuangbao	China (CHN); Lin Naili; Li Fengmei
Doubles	SH6	Indonesia (INA); Subhan; Rina Marlina	China (CHN); Zeng Qingtao; Lin Shuangbao	India (IND); Sivarajan Solaimalai; Nithya Sre Sivan
