= Lin Shuangbao =

Chinese para badminton player

Lin Shuangbao 林双宝
Personal information
- Born: 14 May 1995 (age 31) Wenzhou, China

Sport
- Country: China
- Sport: Badminton
Medal record
Para-badminton
Representing China
Paralympic Games
Silver medal – second place	2024 Paris	Women’s singles
World Championships
Gold medal – first place	2024 Pattaya	Women's doubles
Gold medal – first place	2026 Manama	Women's doubles
Silver medal – second place	2024 Pattaya	Women's singles
Silver medal – second place	2024 Pattaya	Mixed doubles
Silver medal – second place	2026 Manama	Mixed doubles
Bronze medal – third place	2026 Manama	Women's singles
Asian Para Games
Gold medal – first place	2022 Hangzhou	Women's doubles
Silver medal – second place	2022 Hangzhou	Mixed doubles

Lin Shuangbao (born 14 May 1995) is a Chinese para-badminton player. She competed at the 2024 Summer Paralympics, and won the silver medal in the women's singles SH6 event.

== Personal life ==
Her brother, Lin Naili, also won a medal at the 2024 Paralympics.
