= Li Fengmei =

Chinese para badminton player

Li Fengmei 李凤梅
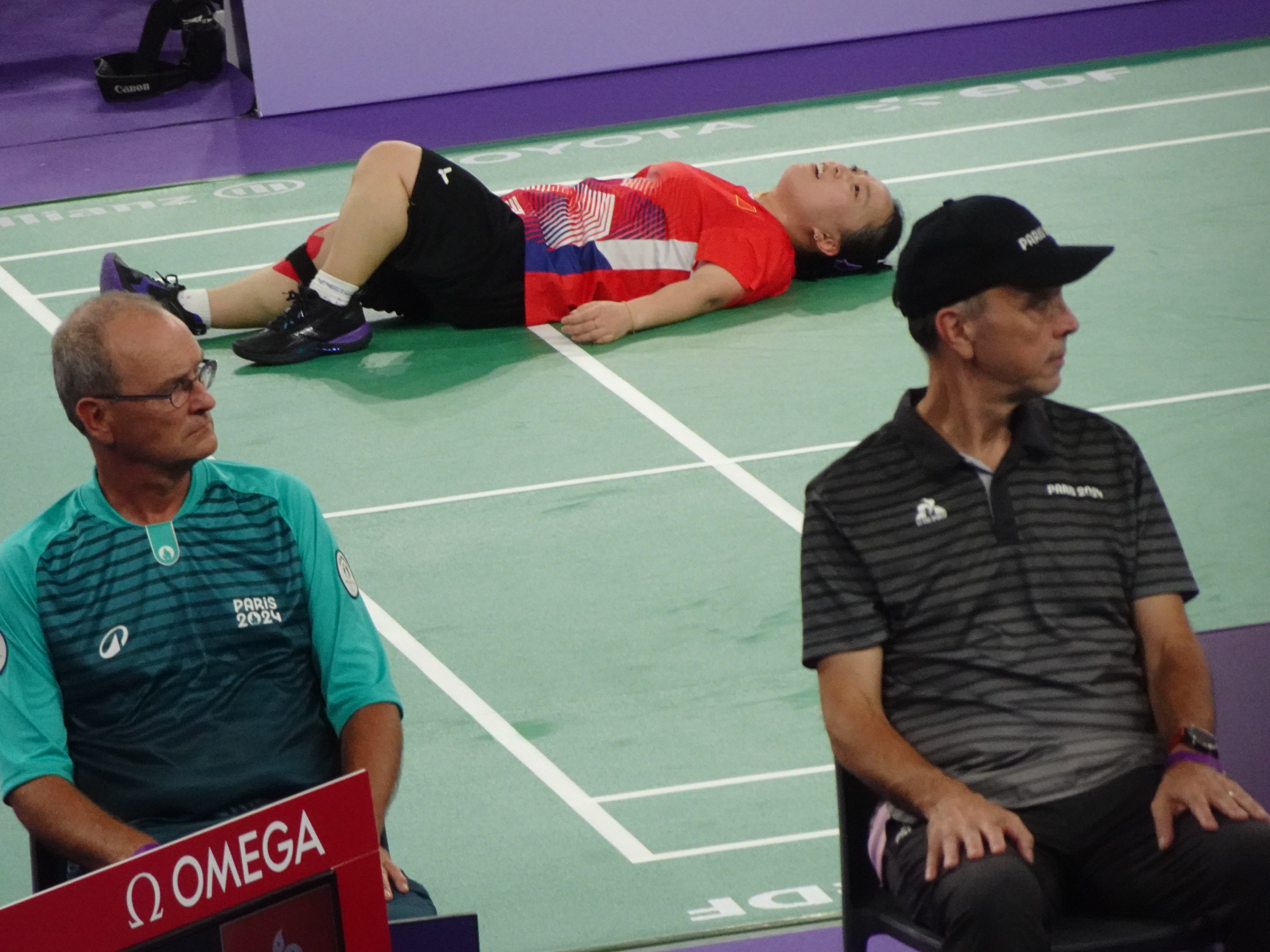

Personal information
- Born: 22 September 1992 (age 33) Longyan, China

Sport
- Country: China
- Sport: Badminton
Medal record
Para-badminton
Representing China
Paralympic Games
Gold medal – first place	2024 Paris	Women’s singles
Gold medal – first place	2024 Paris	Mixed doubles
World Championships
Gold medal – first place	2024 Pattaya	Women's singles
Gold medal – first place	2024 Pattaya	Women's doubles
Gold medal – first place	2024 Pattaya	Mixed doubles
Gold medal – first place	2026 Manama	Women's singles
Gold medal – first place	2026 Manama	Women's doubles
Gold medal – first place	2026 Manama	Mixed doubles
Asian Para Games
Gold medal – first place	2022 Hangzhou	Women's singles
Gold medal – first place	2022 Hangzhou	Women's doubles
Bronze medal – third place	2022 Hangzhou	Mixed doubles

Li Fengmei (born 22 September 1992) is a Chinese para-badminton player. She won two gold medals and a bronze medal at the 2022 Asian Para Games. She competed at the 2024 Summer Paralympics, and won two gold medals in the singles SH6 event and the mixed doubles SH6 event.
