= Sivarajan Solaimalai =

Indian para badminton player (born 1995)

Personal information
- Born: 5 October 1995 (age 31) Tamil Nadu, India

Sport
- Sport: Badminton
Medal record
Para badminton
Representing India
Asian Para Games
| Silver medal – second place | 2026 Aichi-Nagoya | Men's doubles SH6 |
| Bronze medal – third place | 2022 Hangzhou | Men's doubles SH6 |
| Bronze medal – third place | 2022 Hangzhou | Mixed doubles SH6 |

Sivarajan Solaimalai (born 5 October 1995) is a para badminton player from Tamil Nadu. He qualified to represent India at the 2024 Summer Paralympics in the singles SH6 and mixed doubles SH6 badminton events in Paris. He represented India at the 2022 Asian Para Games at Hangzhou, China and won a bronze medal in the doubles SH6 event along with Krishna Nagar.

== Career ==
In June 2024, he won a silver medal in the 4 Nations Para Badminton International Level 1 tournament at Glasgow, Scotland. He also won a bronze in singles and a silver in mixed doubles in the Spanish Para Badminton international event in 2024.

Earlier, he won a bronze in the mixed doubles at 2022 Asian Para Games. He also won a mixed doubles gold along with Nithya Sre Sumathy Sivan at the Brazil Para-Badminton International in April 2023. He won a gold in the men's doubles partnering with Krishna Nagar at the 2023 Canada Para Badminton International in April 2023.

He made his Paralympic debut appearance representing India at the 2024 Summer Paralympics and competed in men's badminton events. During the 2024 Paris Paralympics, he became an instant viral sensation in social media for his rally of badminton shots in the men's SH6 category singles match against Man Kai Chu of Hong Kong, where he literally played by diving on to his right and left directions on consecutive occasions. His proactive tactful handling of shot selections during the match against Man Kai Chu took internet by storm and his range of shots became subject of content in Instagram reels.
