= Lin Naili =

Chinese para badminton player

Lin Naili 林乃利
Personal information
- Born: 16 June 1992 (age 34) Wenzhou, China

Sport
- Country: China
- Sport: Badminton
Medal record
Para-badminton
Representing China
Paralympic Games
| Gold medal – first place | 2024 Paris | Mixed doubles |
World Championships
| Gold medal – first place | 2024 Pattaya | Men's doubles |
| Gold medal – first place | 2024 Pattaya | Mixed doubles |
| Gold medal – first place | 2026 Manama | Men's doubles |
| Gold medal – first place | 2026 Manama | Mixed doubles |
| Silver medal – second place | 2024 Pattaya | Men's singles |
Asian Para Games
| Gold medal – first place | 2022 Hangzhou | Men's doubles |
| Bronze medal – third place | 2022 Hangzhou | Men's singles |
| Bronze medal – third place | 2022 Hangzhou | Mixed doubles |

Lin Naili (born 16 June 1992) is a Chinese para-badminton player. He competed at the 2024 Summer Paralympics, where he won a gold medal in the mixed doubles SH6 event.

== Personal life ==
His sister, Lin Shuangbao, also won a medal at the 2024 Paralympics.
