= Badminton at the 2020 Summer Paralympics – Qualification =

Qualification for badminton at the 2020 Summer Paralympics begins on 1 January 2019 to 16 May 2021. There are 90 expected slots (46 male, 44 female) for the sport across fourteen medal events.

== Timeline ==
Eligible athletes have to gain points to qualify to compete at the Games. The list will be published on 20 May 2021. This table shows the timeline of championships where athletes have to earn points to be able to qualify.

Competition	Date	Venue
Turkish Para-Badminton International 2019	26–31 March 2019	(Turkey) Antalya
Dubai Para-Badminton International 2019	2–7 April 2019	(United Arab Emirates) Dubai
Uganda Para-Badminton International 2019	23–28 April 2019	(Uganda) Kampala
Canada Para-Badminton International 2019	7–12 May 2019	(Canada) Ottawa
Irish Para-Badminton International 2019	17–23 June 2019	(Republic of Ireland) Dublin
2019 BWF Para-Badminton World Championships	20–25 August 2019	(Switzerland) Basel
Thailand Para-Badminton International 2019	16–22 September 2019	(Thailand) Bangkok
China Para-Badminton International 2019	23–29 September 2019	(China) Beijing
Denmark Para-Badminton International 2019	15–20 October 2019	(Denmark) Odense
Japan Para-Badminton International 2019 (Paralympic Games Test Event)	11–17 November 2019	(Japan) Tokyo
Australia Para-Badminton International 2019	19–24 November 2019	(Australia) Melbourne
Brazil Para-Badminton International 2020	10–16 February 2020	(Brazil) São Paulo
Dubai Para-Badminton International 2021	30 March–4 April 2021	(United Arab Emirates) Dubai
Spanish Para-Badminton International 2021	11–16 May 2021	(Spain) Cartagena

== Qualification ==
The qualification slots are allocated to the individual athlete or doubles pair, not to the NPC. The qualification ranking list is regulated by the BWF.

- An NPC can allocated a maximum of eleven male and ten female qualifications slots (total of 21). Exceptions are only granted via the Bipartite Commission Invitation method.
- An NPC can enter maximum of two athletes per singles event, except for the following listed events:
  - Men's singles SS6 can only have one allowed to participate.
  - Women's singles SL4 can have a maximum of three female athletes if they are qualified via the Paralympic Doubles Ranking List allocation.
  - Women's singles SU5 can have a maximum of three female athletes if two are qualified either via the Paralympic Doubles ranking list or Mixed Doubles quota allocation and one via the Singles ranking list allocation.
  - Through Bipartite Commission Invitees
- An NPC can enter one doubles pair per doubles event via the Road to Tokyo Paralympic Doubles Ranking List.
- Selected athletes have to play in a minimum of three of the listed events in order to be ranked and to qualify for the Games.

=== Entries into singles event from doubles ===
- Both players from WH1 or WH1-WH2 pair that qualifies for the men's or women's doubles events will automatically gain entry into their respective singles events if they wish to do so.
- All male SL3, SL4, SU5 players who qualify in the mixed doubles event will automatically be able to play in their respective singles events.
- All female SL4 and SU5 players who qualify in the mixed doubles event will automatically be able to play in their respective singles event unless their NPCs have already reached the maximum entry for the singles event.
- A minimum of one female player from an SL4 pair that qualifies in the Women's doubles SL3-SU5 event is allowed to play in their respective singles event. However, the decision is made by their NPC. All SU5 player who is also qualified for the women's doubles SL3-SU5 event will automatically gain entry into their respective singles event if they wish to do so. Any SL3 player who is also qualified for the women's doubles SL3-SU5 event or mixed doubles event can be entered into the women's singles SL4 according to BWF rules.

== Entry requirements ==
=== Singles ===
Event	Minimum entry
Men's singles WH1	8
Men's singles WH2	8
Men's singles SL3	6
Men's singles SL4	6
Men's singles SU5	6
Men's singles SH6	6
Women's singles WH1	8
Women's singles WH2	8
Women's singles SL4	6
Women's singles SU5	6

=== Doubles ===
Event	Sport class	Points	Combinations permitted	Combinations not permitted	Entry numbers Minimum entry
Men's doubles	WH1 & WH2	Maximum: 3 points	WH1 + WH2; WH1 + WH1	WH2 + WH2	6 pairs
Women's doubles	WH1 & WH2	Maximum: 3 points	WH1 + WH2; WH1 + WH1	WH2 + WH2	6 pairs
Women's doubles	SL3 - SU5	Minimum: 7 points Maximum: 8 points	SL3 + SL4; SL3 + SU5; SL4 + SL4	SL3 + SL3; SL4 + SU5; SU5 + SU5	6 pairs
Mixed doubles	SL3 - SU5	Maximum: 8 points	SL3 + SL3; SL3 + SL4; SL3 + SU5; SL4 + SL4	SL4 + SU5; SU5 + SU5	6 pairs

=== Slot allocations ===
Means of qualification	Date	WH1	WH2	SL3	SL4	SU5	SS6	Total entries
Paralympic Doubles Ranking List Allocation	List publishes: 20 May 2021	Men's doubles: 6 highest ranked pairs		Women's doubles: 6 highest ranked pairs			—N/a	16 male 30 female
Paralympic Doubles Ranking List Allocation	List publishes: 20 May 2021	Women's doubles: 2 highest ranked pairs		Mixed doubles: 2 highest ranked pairs			—N/a	16 male 30 female
Paralympic Singles Ranking List Allocation	List publishes: 20 May 2021	Depends on Doubles Ranking List		3 highest ranked males	3 highest ranked males 2 highest ranked females		5 highest ranked males	17 male 7 female
Bipartite Commission Invitation	16 June 2021	3 males and 3 females		9 males and 4 females			1 male	13 male 7 female
							Total	90

== Qualification summary ==
NOC	Men							Women						Mixed	Total	
NOC	Singles						Doubles	Singles				Doubles		Doubles	Quotas	Athletes
NOC	WH1	WH2	SL3	SL4	SU5	SH6	WH1 WH2	WH1	WH2	SL4	SU5	WH1 WH2	SL3 SU5	SL3 SU5	Quotas	Athletes
Australia		1								1					2	2
Brazil						1									1	1
Canada										1					1	1
China	1	1					1	2	2	2	1	1	1		12	9
Chinese Taipei					1										1	1
Denmark											1				1	1
Egypt					1										1	1
France	1	1		1	1		1			1			1	1	8	6
Germany	2			1			1	2		1		1		1	9	6
Great Britain		1	1			2									4	4
Hong Kong		1				1									2	2
India			2	2		1				1	1		1	1	9	7
Indonesia			1	2	2					2			1	1	9	7
Israel								1							1	1
Japan (H)	2	1	1		1		1	1	2	1	3	1	1	1	16	13
Malaysia					1	1									2	2
Netherlands											1				1	1
Norway										1					1	1
Peru									1						1	1
Poland					1										1	1
Portugal											1				1	1
RPC									1						1	1
South Korea	2	2		1			1	1	1			1			9	7
Switzerland								2				1			3	2
Thailand	1	1		1			1	1	1	2		1	1	1	11	7
Turkey									1		1				2	2
Uganda											1				1	1
Ukraine			1												1	1
Total: 28 NOCs	9	9	6	8	8	6	6	10	9	13	10	6	6	6	112	90

== Qualified players ==
Race to Tokyo Paralympic Singles Ranking List was published on 20 May 2021.

=== Singles ===
Men's singles WH1
No.	QR	Athlete	Country
1	1	Qu Zimo	China
2	2	Lee Dong-seop	South Korea
3	3	Lee Sam-seop	South Korea
4	5	Thomas Wandschneider	Germany
5	8	Hiroshi Murayama	Japan
6	9	Young-chin Mi	Germany
7	10	Osamu Nagashima	Japan
8	12	David Toupé	France
9	13	Jakarin Homhual	Thailand

Men's singles WH2
No.	QR	Athlete	Country
1	1	Kim Jung-jun	South Korea
2	2	Chan Ho Yuen	Hong Kong
3	3	Kim Kyung-hoon	South Korea
4	4	Daiki Kajiwara	Japan
5	5	Martin Rooke	Great Britain
6	8	Mai Jianpeng	China
7	12	Thomas Jakobs	France
8	17	Dumnern Junthong	Thailand
9	30	Grant Manzoney	Australia

Men's singles SL3
No.	QR	Athlete	Country
1	1	Pramod Bhagat	India
2	2	Daniel Bethell	Great Britain
3	3	Manoj Sarkar	India
4	4	Daisuke Fujihara	Japan
5	5	Ukun Rukaendi	Indonesia
6	8	Oleksandr Chyrkov	Ukraine

Men's singles SL4
No.	QR	Athlete	Country
1	1	Lucas Mazur	France
2	2	Tarun Dhillon	India
3	3	Suhas Lalinakere Yathiraj	India
4	4	Fredy Setiawan	Indonesia
5	6	Shin Kyung-hwan	South Korea
6	7	Siripong Teamarrom	Thailand
7	17	Jan-Niklas Pott	Germany
8	–	Hary Susanto	Indonesia

Men's singles SU5
No.	QR	Athlete	Country
1	1	Dheva Anrimusthi	Indonesia
2	2	Cheah Liek Hou	Malaysia
3	3	Suryo Nugroho	Indonesia
4	4	Bartłomiej Mróz	Poland
5	5	Taiyo Imai	Japan
6	6	Meril Loquette	France
7	7	Fang Jen-yu	Chinese Taipei
8	26	Ahmed Eldakrory	Egypt

Men's singles SH6
No.	QR	Athlete	Country
1	1	Krishna Nagar	India
2	2	Jack Shephard	Great Britain
3	3	Chu Man Kai	Hong Kong
4	4	Krysten Coombs	Great Britain
5	6	Vitor Gonçalves Tavares	Brazil
6	7	Didin Taresoh	Malaysia

Women's singles WH1
No.	QR	Athlete	Country
1	1	Sarina Satomi	Japan
2	2	Valeska Knoblauch	Germany
3	3	Sujirat Pookkham	Thailand
4	4	Yin Menglu	China
5	5	Karin Suter-Erath	Switzerland
6	6	Zhang Jing	China
7	7	Nina Gorodetzky	Israel
8	8	Kang Jung-kum	South Korea
9	12	Cynthia Mathez	Switzerland
10	17	Elke Rongen	Germany

Women's singles WH2
No.	QR	Athlete	Country
1	1	Liu Yutong	China
2	2	Xu Tingting	China
3	4	Yuma Yamazaki	Japan
4	5	Amnouy Wetwithan	Thailand
5	6	Rie Ogura	Japan
6	7	Emine Seçkin	Turkey
7	8	Pilar Jáuregui	Peru
8	9	Tatiana Gureeva	RPC
9	10	Lee Sun-ae	South Korea

Women's singles SL4
No.	QR	Athlete	Country
1	1	Leani Ratri Oktila	Indonesia
2	2	Cheng Hefang	China
3	3	Helle Sofie Sagøy	Norway
4	4	Haruka Fujino	Japan
5	5	Ma Huihui	China
6	6	Khalimatus Sadiyah	Indonesia
7	7	Faustine Noël	France
8	8	Chanida Srinavakul	Thailand
9	10	Katrin Seibert	Germany
10	11	Caitlin Dransfield	Australia
11	14	Olivia Meier	Canada
12	26	Parul Parmar	India
13	–	Nipada Saensupa	Thailand

Women's singles SU5
No.	QR	Athlete	Country
1	1	Yang Qiuxia	China
2	2	Ayako Suzuki	Japan
3	3	Cathrine Rosengren	Denmark
4	4	Kaede Kameyama	Japan
5	7	Megan Hollander	Netherlands
6	8	Zehra Bağlar	Turkey
7	9	Beatriz Monteiro	Portugal
8	10	Palak Kohli	India
9	19	Ritah Asiimwe	Uganda
10	–	Akiko Sugino	Japan

=== Doubles ===
Men's doubles WH1–WH2
No.	QR	Athlete	Classify	Country
1	1	Qu Zimo	WH1	China
1	1	Mai Jianpeng	WH2	China
2	2	Lee Dong-seop	WH1	South Korea
2	2	Kim Jung-jun	WH2	South Korea
3	3	Hiroshi Murayama	WH1	Japan
3	3	Daiki Kajiwara	WH2	Japan
4	9	David Toupé	WH1	France
4	9	Thomas Jakobs	WH2	France
4	9	Jakarin Homhual	WH1	Thailand
4	9	Dumern Junthong	WH2	Thailand
6	11	Young-chin Mi	WH1	Germany
6	11	Thomas Wandschneider	WH1	Germany

Women's doubles WH1–WH2
No.	QR	Athlete	Classify	Country
1	1	Sarina Satomi	WH1	Japan
1	1	Yuma Yamazaki	WH2	Japan
2	2	Yin Menglu	WH1	China
2	2	Liu Yutong	WH2	China
3	3	Sujirat Pookkham	WH1	Thailand
3	3	Amnouy Wetwithan	WH2	Thailand
4	6	Kang Jung-kum	WH1	South Korea
4	6	Lee Sun-ae	WH2	South Korea
5	7	Cynthia Mathez	WH1	Switzerland
5	7	Karin Suter-Erath	WH1	Switzerland
6	8	Valeska Knoblauch	WH1	Germany
6	8	Elke Rongen	WH1	Germany

Women's doubles SL3–SU5
No.	QR	Athlete	Classify	Country
1	1	Cheng Hefang	SL4	China
1	1	Ma Huihui	SL4	China
2	2	Leani Ratri Oktila	SL4	Indonesia
2	2	Khalimatus Sadiyah	SL4	Indonesia
3	3	Noriko Ito	SL3	Japan
3	3	Ayako Suzuki	SU5	Japan
4	4	Nipada Saensupa	SL4	Thailand
4	4	Chanida Srinavakul	SL4	Thailand
5	5	Lénaïg Morin	SL4	France
5	5	Faustine Noël	SL4	France
6	6	Parul Parmar	SL3	India
6	6	Palak Kohli	SU5	India

Mixed doubles SL3–SU5
No.	QR	Athlete	Classify	Country
1	1	Hary Susanto	SL4	Indonesia
1	1	Leani Ratri Oktila	SL4	Indonesia
2	2	Lucas Mazur	SL4	France
2	2	Faustine Noël	SL4	France
3	3	Siripog Teamarrom	SL4	Thailand
3	3	Nipada Saensupa	SL4	Thailand
4	4	Jan-Niklas Pott	SL4	Germany
4	4	Katrin Seibert	SL4	Germany
5	7	Daisuke Fujihara	SL3	Japan
5	7	Akiko Sugino	SU5	Japan
6	31	Pramod Bhagat	SL3	India
6	31	Palak Kohli	SU5	India

== See also ==
- Badminton at the 2020 Summer Olympics – Qualification
