= Cheng Hefang =

Chinese para-badminton player (born 1995)

Cheng Hefang 程和芳
Personal information
- Born: 1 September 1995 (age 30) Guizhou, China

Sport
- Country: China
- Sport: Badminton
- Coached by: Zhang Xianmin

Women's singles SL4 Women's doubles SL3–SU5 Mixed doubles SL3–SU5
- Highest ranking: 2 (WS 1 April 2019); 1 (WD with Ma Huihui 17 November 2019); 7 (XD with Ou Wei 7 April 2019)
- Current ranking: 1 (WS); 63 (XD with Ou Wei) (8 November 2022)
Medal record
Women's para badminton
Representing China
Paralympic Games
Gold medal – first place	2020 Tokyo	Women's singles
Silver medal – second place	2020 Tokyo	Women's doubles
Gold medal – first place	2024 Paris	Women's singles
World Championships
Gold medal – first place	2017 Ulsan	Women's singles
Gold medal – first place	2019 Basel	Women's doubles
Gold medal – first place	2024 Pattaya	Women's singles
Silver medal – second place	2017 Ulsan	Women's doubles
Silver medal – second place	2019 Basel	Women's singles
Asian Para Games
Gold medal – first place	2014 Incheon	Women's doubles
Gold medal – first place	2018 Jakarta	Women's singles
Gold medal – first place	2022 Hangzhou	Women's singles
Silver medal – second place	2014 Incheon	Women's singles
Silver medal – second place	2018 Jakarta	Women's doubles
Asian Championships
Gold medal – first place	2016 Beijing	Women's doubles
Silver medal – second place	2016 Beijing	Mixed doubles
Bronze medal – third place	2016 Beijing	Women's singles

Cheng Hefang (born 1 September 1995) is a Chinese para-badminton player who has played each of the three variations of the sport (women's singles, women's doubles, and mixed doubles) at the highest world level.

In 2021, Cheng won a silver medal representing China in the women's doubles SL3–SU5 event of the 2020 Summer Paralympics alongside Ma Huihui, having lost to Leani Ratri Oktila and Khalimatus Sadiyah in the gold medal match, but won a gold medal in the women's singles SL4 event, defeating Leani Ratri Oktila.

== Achievements ==
=== Paralympic Games ===
Women's singles

Year	Venue	Opponent	Score	Result
2020	Yoyogi National Gymnasium, Tokyo, Japan	(Indonesia) Leani Ratri Oktila	21–19, 17–21, 21–16	Gold
2024	Arena Porte de La Chapelle, Paris, France	(Indonesia) Leani Ratri Oktila	21–14, 21–18	Gold

Women's doubles

Year	Venue	Partner	Opponent	Score	Result
2020	Yoyogi National Gymnasium, Tokyo, Japan	(China) Ma Huihui	(Indonesia) Leani Ratri Oktila (Indonesia) Khalimatus Sadiyah	18–21, 12–21	Silver

=== World Championships ===
Women's singles

Year	Venue	Opponent	Score	Result
2017	Dongchun Gymnasium, Ulsan, South Korea	(Indonesia) Leani Ratri Oktila	21–14, 21–13	Gold
2019	St. Jakobshalle, Basel, Switzerland	(Indonesia) Leani Ratri Oktila	16–21, 16–21	Silver
2024	Pattaya Exhibition and Convention Hall, Pattaya, Thailand	(Indonesia) Leani Ratri Oktila	21–11, 21–9	Gold

Women’s doubles

Year	Venue	Partner	Opponent	Score	Result
2017	Dongchun Gymnasium, Ulsan, South Korea	(China) Ma Huihui	(India) Parul Parmar (Japan) Akiko Sugino	16–21, 19–21	Silver
2019	St. Jakobshalle, Basel, Switzerland	(China) Ma Huihui	(Indonesia) Leani Ratri Oktila (Indonesia) Khalimatus Sadiyah	21–17, 21–12	Gold

=== Asian Para Games ===
Women's singles

Year	Venue	Opponent	Score	Result
2014	Gyeyang Gymnasium, Incheon, South Korea	(China) Sun Shouqun	13–21, 17–21	Silver
2018	Istora Gelora Bung Karno, Jakarta, Indonesia	(Indonesia) Leani Ratri Oktila	18–21, 21–18, 21–13	Gold

Women’s doubles

Year	Venue	Partner	Opponent	Score	Result
2014	Gyeyang Gymnasium, Incheon, South Korea	(China) Ma Huihui	(Indonesia) Leani Ratri Oktila (Indonesia) Khalimatus Sadiyah	21–10, 21–16	Gold
2018	Istora Gelora Bung Karno, Jakarta, Indonesia	(China) Ma Huihui	(Indonesia) Leani Ratri Oktila (Indonesia) Khalimatus Sadiyah	15–21, 12–21	Silver

=== Asian Championships ===
Women's singles

Year	Venue	Opponent	Score	Result
2016	China Administration of Sport for Persons with Disabilities, Beijing, China	(China) Yang Qiuxia	17–21, 21–19, 15–21	Bronze

Women's doubles

Year	Venue	Partner	Opponent	Score	Result
2016 (Note: This tournament uses a round robin system.)	China Administration of Sport for Persons with Disabilities, Beijing, China	(China) Ma Huihui	(Japan) Akiko Sugino (Japan) Asami Yamada	21–10, 21–11	Gold
2016	China Administration of Sport for Persons with Disabilities, Beijing, China	(China) Ma Huihui	(India) Parul Parmar (Indonesia) Khalimatus Sadiyah	21–11, 21–4	Gold
2016	China Administration of Sport for Persons with Disabilities, Beijing, China	(China) Ma Huihui	(India) Chiranjita Bharali (India) Manasi Girishchandra Joshi	21–3, 21–5	Gold

Mixed doubles

Year	Venue	Partner	Opponent	Score	Result
2016	China Administration of Sport for Persons with Disabilities, Beijing, China	(China) Ou Wei	(Japan) Toshiaki Suenaga (Japan) Akiko Sugino	19–21, 21–19, 20–22	Silver

=== International Tournaments (9 titles, 6 runners-up) ===
Women's singles

Year	Tournament	Opponent	Score	Result
2015	China Para Badminton International	(China) Ma Huihui	19–21, 20–22	(silver) Runner-up
2017	Japan Para Badminton International	(Thailand) Chanida Srinavakul	21–7, 21–3	(gold) Winner
2019	Dubai Para Badminton International	(Indonesia) Leani Ratri Oktila	21–15, 21–15	(gold) Winner
2019	China Para Badminton International	(China) Ma Huihui	21–8, 21–10	(gold) Winner
2019	Japan Para Badminton International	(Japan) Fujino Haruka	21–11, 21–12	(gold) Winner
2020	Brazil Para Badminton International	(Indonesia) Leani Ratri Oktila	21–16, 16–21, 21–14	(gold) Winner

Men's doubles

Year	Tournament	Partner	Opponent	Score	Result
2015 (Note: This tournament uses a round robin system.)	China Para Badminton International	(China) Ma Huihui	(China) Li Tongtong (China) Xing Jiahuan	21–9, 21–10	(gold) Winner
2015	China Para Badminton International	(China) Ma Huihui	(Hong Kong) Ng Lai Ling (Japan) Mamiko Toyoda	21–7, 21–10	(gold) Winner
2015	China Para Badminton International	(China) Ma Huihui	(France) Véronique Braud (Norway) Helle Sofie Sagøy	21–4, 21–5	(gold) Winner
2019	Turkish Para Badminton International	(China) Ma Huihui	(Japan) Mio Hayashi (Japan) Ayako Suzuki	21–12, 18–21, 16–21	(silver) Runner-up
2019	Dubai Para Badminton International	(China) Ma Huihui	(Indonesia) Leani Ratri Oktila (Indonesia) Khalimatus Sadiyah	21–8, 12–21, 16–21	(silver) Runner-up
2019	China Para Badminton International	(China) Ma Huihui	(Japan) Noriko Ito (Japan) Ayako Suzuki	21–8, 21–7	(gold) Winner
2019	Japan Para Badminton International	(China) Ma Huihui	(Japan) Noriko Ito (Japan) Ayako Suzuki	21–13, 21–8	(gold) Winner
2020	Brazil Para Badminton International	(China) Ma Huihui	(Indonesia) Leani Ratri Oktila (Indonesia) Khalimatus Sadiyah	15–21, 19–21	(silver) Runner-up

Mixed doubles

Year	Tournament	Partner	Opponent	Score	Result
2015	China Para Badminton International	(China) Ou Wei	(China) Shi Shengzhuo (China) Wen Yu	16–21, 13–21	(silver) Runner-up
2017	Japan Para Badminton International	(China) Ou Wei	(France) Lucas Mazur (France) Faustine Noël	13–21, 21–18, 21–13	(gold) Winner
2019	Turkish Para Badminton International	(China) Ou Wei	(Indonesia) Hary Susanto (Indonesia) Leani Ratri Oktila	9–21, 13–21	(silver) Runner-up
