= Badminton at the 2020 Summer Paralympics – Women's singles SL4 =

Women's singles SL4 at the XVI Paralympic Games
- Venue: Yoyogi National Gymnasium
- Dates: 2–5 September 2021
- Competitors: 13 from 10 nations

Medalists
1st place, gold medalist(s)		Cheng Hefang	China
2nd place, silver medalist(s)		Leani Ratri Oktila	Indonesia
3rd place, bronze medalist(s)		Ma Huihui	China

The women's singles SL4 tournament at the 2020 Summer Paralympics in Tokyo took place between 2 and 5 September 2021 at Yoyogi National Gymnasium.

== Seeds ==
These were the seeds for this event:

1. Leani Ratri Oktila (INA) (silver medalist)
2. Cheng Hefang (CHN) (gold medalist)
3. Helle Sofie Sagøy (NOR) (fourth place)
4. Haruka Fujino (JPN) (group stage)

== Group stage ==
The draw of the group stage revealed on 26 August 2021. The group stage was played from 2 to 3 September. The winners of each group advanced to the knockout rounds.

=== Group A ===
Pos	Team	Pld	W	L	GF	GA	GD	PF	PA	PD	Pts	Qualification
1	Leani Ratri Oktila (INA)	2	2	0	4	0	+4	84	42	+42	2	Advance to semi-finals
2	Khalimatus Sadiyah (INA)	2	1	1	2	2	0	66	73	−7	1	
3	Faustine Noël (FRA)	2	0	2	0	4	−4	49	84	−35	0	

Source: TOCOG

Date	Time	Player 1	Score	Player 2	Set 1	Set 2	Set 3
2 Sep	12:20	Leani Ratri Oktila (Indonesia)	2–0	(Indonesia) Khalimatus Sadiyah	21–14	21–10	
2 Sep	18:00	Faustine Noël (France)	0–2	(Indonesia) Khalimatus Sadiyah	18–21	13–21	
3 Sep	19:20	Leani Ratri Oktila (Indonesia)	2–0	(France) Faustine Noël	21–12	21–6	

=== Group B ===
Pos	Team	Pld	W	L	GF	GA	GD	PF	PA	PD	Pts	Qualification
1	Ma Huihui (CHN)	1	1	0	2	0	+2	48	33	+15	1	Advance to semi-finals
2	Haruka Fujino (JPN) (H)	1	0	1	0	2	−2	33	48	−15	0	
3	Nipada Saensupa (THA)	0	0	0	0	0	0	0	0	0	0	Retired

Source: TOCOG
(H) Host

Date	Time	Player 1	Score	Player 2	Set 1	Set 2	Set 3
2 Sep	11:40	Haruka Fujino (Japan)	~~2–0~~ (voided)	(Thailand) Nipada Saensupa	~~21–17~~	~~21–10~~	
2 Sep	19:20	Haruka Fujino (Japan)	0–2	(China) Ma Huihui	25–27	8–21	
3 Sep	19:20	Ma Huihui (China)	Retired	(Thailand) Nipada Saensupa	21–10	0–0^{r}	

=== Group C ===
Pos	Team	Pld	W	L	GF	GA	GD	PF	PA	PD	Pts	Qualification
1	Helle Sofie Sagøy (NOR)	3	3	0	6	0	+6	126	66	+60	3	Advance to semi-finals
2	Chanida Srinavakul (THA)	3	2	1	4	3	+1	127	121	+6	2	
3	Olivia Meier (CAN)	3	1	2	3	5	−2	120	160	−40	1	
4	Caitlin Dransfield (AUS)	3	0	3	1	6	−5	109	135	−26	0	

Source: TOCOG

Date	Time	Player 1	Score	Player 2	Set 1	Set 2	Set 3
2 Sep	11:00	Helle Sofie Sagøy (Norway)	2–0	(Australia) Caitlin Dransfield	21–17	21–13	
2 Sep	11:40	Chanida Srinavakul (Thailand)	2–1	(Canada) Olivia Meier	22–20	20–22	21–13
2 Sep	18:40	Helle Sofie Sagøy (Norway)	2–0	(Canada) Olivia Meier	21–6	21–8	
2 Sep	18:40	Chanida Srinavakul (Thailand)	2–0	(Australia) Caitlin Dransfield	21–8	21–16	
3 Sep	18:00	Helle Sofie Sagøy (Norway)	2–0	(Thailand) Chanida Srinavakul	21–14	21–8	
3 Sep	18:40	Olivia Meier (Canada)	2–1	(Australia) Caitlin Dransfield	7–21	21–13	23–21

=== Group D ===
Pos	Team	Pld	W	L	GF	GA	GD	PF	PA	PD	Pts	Qualification
1	Cheng Hefang (CHN)	2	2	0	4	0	+4	84	26	+58	2	Advance to semi-finals
2	Katrin Seibert (GER)	2	1	1	2	3	−1	79	99	−20	1	
3	Parul Parmar (IND)	2	0	2	1	4	−3	67	105	−38	0	

Source: TOCOG

Date	Time	Player 1	Score	Player 2	Set 1	Set 2	Set 3
2 Sep	12:20	Cheng Hefang (China)	2–0	(India) Parul Parmar	21–8	21–2	
2 Sep	18:00	Katrin Seibert (Germany)	2–1	(India) Parul Parmar	23–21	19–21	21–15
3 Sep	20:00	Cheng Hefang (China)	2–0	(Germany) Katrin Seibert	21–5	21–11	

== Finals ==
The knockout stage was played from 4 to 5 September.

Semi-finals
A1	Leani Ratri Oktila (INA)	21	21
B1	Ma Huihui (CHN)	12	7
C1	Helle Sofie Sagøy (NOR)	15	10
D1	Cheng Hefang (CHN)	21	21

Gold medal match
A1	Leani Ratri Oktila (INA) (silver)	19	21	16
D1	Cheng Hefang (CHN) (gold)	21	17	21
Bronze medal match
B1	Ma Huihui (CHN) (bronze)	21	21
C1	Helle Sofie Sagøy (NOR)	12	5
