= Akiko Sugino =

Japanese para badminton player

Akiko Sugino 杉野 明子
Personal information
- Born: December 7, 1990 (age 35) Ichihara, Chiba, Japan

Sport
- Country: Japan
- Sport: Badminton

Women's singles SU5 Women's doubles SL3–SU5 Mixed doubles SL3–SU5
- Highest ranking: 1 (WS 19 July 2022); 15 (WD with Noriko Ito 1 April 2019); 3 (XD with Toshiaki Suenaga 1 January 2019)
- Current ranking: 3 (WS); 52 (WD with Noriko Ito); 7 (XD with Daisuke Fujihara) (8 November 2022)
Medal record
Para-badminton
Representing Japan
Paralympic Games
Bronze medal – third place	2020 Tokyo	Women's singles
Bronze medal – third place	2020 Tokyo	Mixed doubles
World Championships
Gold medal – first place	2011 Guatemala City	Women's singles
Gold medal – first place	2011 Guatemala City	Mixed doubles
Gold medal – first place	2017 Ulsan	Women's doubles
Silver medal – second place	2013 Dortmund	Women's singles
Bronze medal – third place	2017 Ulsan	Mixed doubles
Bronze medal – third place	2019 Basel	Mixed doubles
Asian Para Games
Bronze medal – third place	2014 Incheon	Women's doubles
Bronze medal – third place	2018 Jakarta	Mixed doubles
Asian Championships
Gold medal – first place	2016 Beijing	Mixed doubles
Silver medal – second place	2016 Beijing	Women's doubles

Akiko Sugino (杉野 明子, Sugino Akiko; born December 7, 1990) is a Japanese para-badminton player who competes in international level events. At the 2020 Summer Paralympics, Sugino won a bronze medal in the women's singles and mixed doubles events. Sugino is also a former world champion in the women's singles SU5 discipline.

== Personal life ==
Sugino has a disability in her left arm. She encountered and started playing para-badminton when she was in high school and later competed in able-bodied tournaments.

== Achievements ==
=== Paralympic Games ===
Women's singles

Year	Venue	Opponent	Score	Result
2020	Yoyogi National Gymnasium, Tokyo, Japan	(Japan) Kaede Kameyama	21–16, 6–21, 21–13	Bronze

Mixed doubles

Year	Venue	Partner	Opponent	Score	Result
2020	Yoyogi National Gymnasium, Tokyo, Japan	(Japan) Daisuke Fujihara	(India) Pramod Bhagat (India) Palak Kohli	23–21, 21–19	Bronze

=== World Championships ===
Women's singles

Year	Venue	Opponent	Score	Result
2011	Guatemala City, Guatemala	(Japan) Yuko Yamaguchi	21–7, 21–15	Gold
2013	Helmut-Körnig-Halle, Dortmund, Germany	(Japan) Mamiko Toyoda	21–11, 14–21, 23–25	Silver

Women's doubles

Year	Venue	Partner	Opponent	Score	Result
2017	Dongchun Gymnasium, Ulsan, South Korea	(India) Parul Parmar	(China) Cheng Hefang (China) Ma Huihui	21–16, 21–19	Gold

Mixed doubles

Year	Venue	Partner	Opponent	Score	Result
2011 (Note: This tournament uses a round robin system.)	Guatemala City, Guatemala	(Malaysia) Loi Lang Yean	(Japan) Yusuke Yamaguchi (Japan) Yuko Yamaguchi	21–13, 21–19	Gold
2011	Guatemala City, Guatemala	(Malaysia) Loi Lang Yean	(Japan) Daisuke Fujihara (Japan) Aki Takahashi	21–18, 21–10	Gold
2011	Guatemala City, Guatemala	(Malaysia) Loi Lang Yean	(Hong Kong) Chan Cho Leung (South Korea) Heo Sun-hee	21–13, 15–21, 21–18	Gold
2017	Dongchun Gymnasium, Ulsan, South Korea	(Japan) Toshiaki Suenaga	(China) Yang Jianyuan (China) Yang Qiuxia	11–21, 17–21	Bronze
2019	St. Jakobshalle, Basel, Switzerland	(Japan) Toshiaki Suenaga	(Germany) Jan Niklas-Pott (Germany) Katrin Seibert	21–19, 14–21, 19–21	Bronze

=== Asian Para Games ===
Women's doubles

Year	Venue	Partner	Opponent	Score	Result
2014 (Note: This tournament uses a round robin system.)	Gyeyang Gymnasium, Incheon, South Korea	(Japan) Noriko Ito	(Indonesia) Leani Ratri Oktila (Indonesia) Khalimatus Sadiyah	17–21, 21–18, 21–19	Bronze
2014	Gyeyang Gymnasium, Incheon, South Korea	(Japan) Noriko Ito	(Thailand) Nipada Saensupa (Thailand) Chanida Srinavakul	21–19, 14–21, 22–24	Bronze
2014	Gyeyang Gymnasium, Incheon, South Korea	(Japan) Noriko Ito	(China) Cheng Hefang (China) Ma Huihui	11–21, 12–21	Bronze
2014	Gyeyang Gymnasium, Incheon, South Korea	(Japan) Noriko Ito	(Thailand) Wandee Kamtam (Thailand) Sudsaifon Yodpa	17–21, 21–9, 21–6	Bronze

Mixed doubles

Year	Venue	Partner	Opponent	Score	Result
2018	Istora Gelora Bung Karno, Jakarta, Indonesia	(Japan) Toshiaki Suenaga	(Thailand) Siripong Teamarrom (Thailand) Nipada Saensupa	18–21, 21–19, 14–21	Bronze

=== Asian Championships ===
Women's doubles

Year	Venue	Partner	Opponent	Score	Result
2016 (Note: This tournament uses a round robin system.)	China Administration of Sport for Persons with Disabilities, Beijing, China	(Japan) Asami Yamada	(China) Cheng Hefang (China) Ma Huihui	10–21, 11–21	Silver
2016	China Administration of Sport for Persons with Disabilities, Beijing, China	(Japan) Asami Yamada	(India) Chiranjita Bharali (India) Manasi Girishchandra Joshi	21–8, 21–4	Silver
2016	China Administration of Sport for Persons with Disabilities, Beijing, China	(Japan) Asami Yamada	(India) Parul Parmar (Indonesia) Khalimatus Sadiyah	21–15^{r}	Silver

Mixed doubles

Year	Venue	Partner	Opponent	Score	Result
2016	China Administration of Sport for Persons with Disabilities, Beijing, China	(Japan) Toshiaki Suenaga	(China) Ou Wei (China) Cheng Hefang	21–19, 19–21, 22–20	Gold

=== BWF Para Badminton World Circuit (2 titles, 4 runners-up) ===
The BWF Para Badminton World Circuit – Grade 2, Level 1, 2 and 3 tournaments has been sanctioned by the Badminton World Federation from 2022.

Women's singles

Year	Tournament	Level	Opponent	Score	Result
2022	Spanish Para Badminton International	Level 1	(Japan) Kaede Kameyama	21–14, 12–21, 21–19	(gold) Winner
2022	Dubai Para Badminton International	Level 2	(India) Manisha Ramdass	17–21, 11–21	(silver) Runner-up
2022	Canada Para Badminton International	Level 1	(India) Manisha Ramdass	25–27, 9–21	(silver) Runner-up
2022	4 Nations Para Badminton International	Level 1	(Denmark) Cathrine Rosengren	13–21, 12–12 retired	(silver) Runner-up

Mixed doubles

Year	Tournament	Level	Partner	Opponent	Score	Result
2022	Brazil Para Badminton International	Level 2	(Japan) Daisuke Fujihara	(India) Chirag Baretha (India) Mandeep Kaur	22–20, 21–19	(gold) Winner
2022	Canada Para Badminton International	Level 1	(Japan) Daisuke Fujihara	(Japan) Taiyo Imai (Japan) Noriko Ito	16–21, 10–21	(silver) Runner-up

=== International Tournaments (7 titles, 8 runners-up) ===
Women's singles

Year	Tournament	Opponent	Score	Result
2015 (Note: This tournament uses a round robin system.)	Indonesia Para Badminton International	(Japan) Mamiko Toyoda	9–21, 22–20, 18–21	(silver) Runner-up
2015	Indonesia Para Badminton International	(Indonesia) Larti	21–7, 21–11	(silver) Runner-up
2015	Indonesia Para Badminton International	(Turkey) Zehra Bağlar	21–7, 21–5	(silver) Runner-up
2015	Indonesia Para Badminton International	(Malaysia) Norrizah Rahim	21–14, 21–15	(silver) Runner-up
2016 (Note: This tournament uses a round robin system.)	Colombia Para Badminton International	(Peru) Laura Johana	21–6, 21–6	(gold) Winner
2016	Colombia Para Badminton International	(Brazil) Abinaecia Maria da Silva	21–4, 21–1	(gold) Winner
2016	Colombia Para Badminton International	(Brazil) Cintya Oliveira	21–9, 21–5	(gold) Winner
2017 (Note: This tournament uses a round robin system.)	Peru Para Badminton International	(Brazil) Mikaela Costa Almeida	21–6, 21–8	(gold) Winner
2017	Peru Para Badminton International	(Japan) Mamiko Toyoda	21–19, 19–21, 21–16	(gold) Winner
2017	Peru Para Badminton International	(Brazil) Cintya Oliveira	21–11, 21–7	(gold) Winner
2017	Peru Para Badminton International	(Peru) Laura Johana	21–3, 21–6	(gold) Winner
2017	USA Para Badminton International	(Japan) Mamiko Toyoda	20–22, 19–21	(silver) Runner-up
2018	Spanish Para Badminton International	(Japan) Mamiko Toyoda	16–21, 21–23	(silver) Runner-up
2018	Brazil Para Badminton International	(Japan) Ayako Suzuki	13–21, 16–21	(silver) Runner-up
2018	Japan Para Badminton International	(Japan) Ayako Suzuki	15–21, 5–21	(silver) Runner-up

Women's doubles

Year	Tournament	Partner	Opponent	Score	Result
2017	Peru Para Badminton International	(Japan) Asami Yamada	(Brazil) Cássia Angélica Morais (Brazil) Cintya Oliveira	21–3, 21–5	(gold) Winner
2018	Brazil Para Badminton International	(Japan) Noriko Ito	(Brazil) Abinaecia Maria da Silva (Japan) Mamiko Toyoda	20–22, 21–17, 19–21	(silver) Runner-up

Mixed doubles

Year	Tournament	Partner	Opponent	Score	Result
2016 (Note: This tournament uses a round robin system.)	Colombia Para Badminton International	(Japan) Daisuke Fujihara	(Cuba) Rolando Bello Rodríguez (Peru) Laura Johana	21–10, 21–3	(gold) Winner
2016	Colombia Para Badminton International	(Japan) Daisuke Fujihara	(Brazil) Eduardo Oliveira (Brazil) Abinaecia Maria da Silva	21–7, 21–8	(gold) Winner
2016	Colombia Para Badminton International	(Japan) Daisuke Fujihara	(Brazil) Leonardo Zuffo (Brazil) Cintya Oliveira	21–3, 21–14	(gold) Winner
2017	USA Para Badminton International	(Japan) Toshiaki Suenaga	(Japan) Taku Hiroi (Japan) Mamiko Toyoda	21–19, 21–13	(gold) Winner
2018	Turkish Para Badminton International	(Japan) Toshiaki Suenaga	(Thailand) Siripong Teamarrom (Thailand) Nipada Saensupa	12–21, 18–21	(silver) Runner-up
2018	Brazil Para Badminton International	(Japan) Toshiaki Suenaga	(Japan) Taiyo Imai (Japan) Asami Yamada	21–9, 21–17	(gold) Winner
2018	Japan Para Badminton International	(Japan) Toshiaki Suenaga	(Thailand) Siripong Teamarrom (Thailand) Chanida Srinavakul	21–15, 21–18	(gold) Winner
2021	Spanish Para Badminton International	(Japan) Daisuke Fujihara	(France) Lucas Mazur (France) Faustine Noël	12–21, 8–21	(silver) Runner-up
