= Ma Huihui =

Chinese para-badminton player (born 1989)

Ma Huihui 马会会
Personal information
- Born: 12 August 1989 (age 36) Heilongjiang, China
- Height: 160 cm (5 ft 3 in)
- Weight: 50 kg (110 lb)

Sport
- Country: China
- Sport: Badminton

Women's singles SL4 Women's doubles SL3–SU5 Mixed doubles SL3–SU5
- Highest ranking: 5 (WS 17 November 2019); 1 (WD with Cheng Hefang 17 November 2019); 18 (XD with Gao Yuyang 6 January 2020)
Medal record
Women's para badminton
Representing China
Paralympic Games
Silver medal – second place	2020 Tokyo	Women's doubles
Bronze medal – third place	2020 Tokyo	Women's singles
World Championships
Gold medal – first place	2009 Seoul	Women's singles
Gold medal – first place	2009 Seoul	Women's doubles
Gold medal – first place	2019 Basel	Women's doubles
Silver medal – second place	2009 Seoul	Women's singles SU5
Silver medal – second place	2017 Ulsan	Women's doubles
Bronze medal – third place	2017 Ulsan	Women's singles
Asian Para Games
Gold medal – first place	2010 Guangzhou	Women's singles
Gold medal – first place	2014 Incheon	Women's doubles
Silver medal – second place	2018 Jakarta	Women's doubles
Bronze medal – third place	2014 Incheon	Women's singles
Bronze medal – third place	2018 Jakarta	Women's singles
Asian Championships
Gold medal – first place	2016 Beijing	Women's doubles
Bronze medal – third place	2016 Beijing	Mixed doubles

Ma Huihui (born 12 August 1989) is a Chinese para-badminton player who has played each of the three variations of the sport (women's singles, women's doubles, and mixed doubles) at the highest world level.

In 2021, Ma Huihui won a silver medal representing China in the women's doubles SL3–SU5 event of the 2020 Summer Paralympics alongside Cheng Hefang, having lost to Leani Ratri Oktila and Khalimatus Sadiyah in the gold medal match.

== Achievements ==
=== Paralympic Games ===
Women's singles SL4

Year	Venue	Opponent	Score	Result
2020	Yoyogi National Gymnasium, Tokyo, Japan	(Norway) Helle Sofie Sagøy	21–12, 21–5	Bronze

Women's doubles SL3–SU5

Year	Venue	Partner	Opponent	Score	Result
2020	Yoyogi National Gymnasium, Tokyo, Japan	(China) Cheng Hefang	(Indonesia) Leani Ratri Oktila (Indonesia) Khalimatus Sadiyah	18–21, 12–21	Silver

=== World Championships ===
Women's singles

Year	Venue	Opponent	Score	Result
2009	Fencing Hall, Seoul, South Korea	(China) Wang Songye	15–21, 21–15, 21–15	Gold
2009 (SU5)	Fencing Hall, Seoul, South Korea	(Japan) Ayako Suzuki	10–21, 3–21	Silver
2017	Dongchun Gymnasium, Ulsan, South Korea	(China) Cheng Hefang	10–21, 12–21	Bronze

Women’s doubles

Year	Venue	Partner	Opponent	Score	Result
2009 (Note: This tournament uses a round robin system.)	Fencing Hall, Seoul, South Korea	(China) Wang Songye	(Japan) Yuko Yamaguchi (Japan) Aki Takahashi	21–11, 21–18	Gold
2009	Fencing Hall, Seoul, South Korea	(China) Wang Songye	(South Korea) Lee Jeom-suk (South Korea) Heo Sun-hee	21–5, 21–6	Gold
2009	Fencing Hall, Seoul, South Korea	(China) Wang Songye	(Hong Kong) Wong Wai Yin (Hong Kong) Ng Lai Ling	21–5, 21–5	Gold
2009	Fencing Hall, Seoul, South Korea	(China) Wang Songye	(Thailand) Wandee Kamtam (Thailand) Nipada Saensupa	21–13, 21–11	Gold
2017	Dongchun Gymnasium, Ulsan, South Korea	(China) Cheng Hefang	(India) Parul Parmar (Japan) Akiko Sugino	16–21, 19–21	Silver
2019	St. Jakobshalle, Basel, Switzerland	(China) Cheng Hefang	(Indonesia) Leani Ratri Oktila (Indonesia) Khalimatus Sadiyah	21–17, 21–12	Gold

=== Asian Para Games ===
Women's singles

Year	Venue	Opponent	Score	Result
2010	Tianhe Gymnasium, Guangzhou, China	(China) Wang Songye	22–20, 21–14	Gold
2014	Gyeyang Gymnasium, Incheon, South Korea	(China) Cheng Hefang	13–21, 17–21	Bronze
2018	Istora Gelora Bung Karno, Jakarta, Indonesia	(China) Cheng Hefang	9–21, 11–21	Bronze

Women’s doubles

Year	Venue	Partner	Opponent	Score	Result
2014	Gyeyang Gymnasium, Incheon, South Korea	(China) Cheng Hefang	(Indonesia) Leani Ratri Oktila (Indonesia) Khalimatus Sadiyah	21–10, 21–16	Gold
2018	Istora Gelora Bung Karno, Jakarta, Indonesia	(China) Cheng Hefang	(Indonesia) Leani Ratri Oktila (Indonesia) Khalimatus Sadiyah	15–21, 12–21	Silver

=== Asian Championships ===
Women's singles

Year	Venue	Opponent	Score	Result
2016	China Administration of Sport for Persons with Disabilities, Beijing, China	(China) Yang Qiuxia	17–21, 21–19, 15–21	Bronze

Women's doubles

Year	Venue	Partner	Opponent	Score	Result
2016 (Note: This tournament uses a round robin system.)	China Administration of Sport for Persons with Disabilities, Beijing, China	(China) Cheng Hefang	(Japan) Akiko Sugino (Japan) Asami Yamada	21–10, 21–11	Gold
2016	China Administration of Sport for Persons with Disabilities, Beijing, China	(China) Cheng Hefang	(India) Parul Parmar (Indonesia) Khalimatus Sadiyah	21–11, 21–4	Gold
2016	China Administration of Sport for Persons with Disabilities, Beijing, China	(China) Cheng Hefang	(India) Chiranjita Bharali (India) Manasi Girishchandra Joshi	21–3, 21–5	Gold

Mixed doubles

Year	Venue	Partner	Opponent	Score	Result
2016	China Administration of Sport for Persons with Disabilities, Beijing, China	(China) Gao Yuyang	(Japan) Toshiaki Suenaga (Japan) Akiko Sugino	19–21, 10–21	Bronze

=== International Tournaments (4 titles, 6 runners-up) ===
Women's singles

Year	Tournament	Opponent	Score	Result
2015	China Para Badminton International	(China) Cheng Hefang	21–19, 22–20	(gold) Winner
2015 (SU5)	China Para Badminton International	(China) Yang Qiuxia	Walkover	(silver) Runner-up
2019	Turkish Para Badminton International	(Indonesia) Leani Ratri Oktila	17–21, 16–21	(silver) Runner-up
2019	China Para Badminton International	(China) Cheng Hefang	8–21, 10–21	(silver) Runner-up

Women's doubles

Year	Tournament	Partner	Opponent	Score	Result
2015 (Note: This tournament uses a round robin system.)	China Para Badminton International	(China) Cheng Hefang	(China) Li Tongtong (China) Xing Jiahuan	21–9, 21–10	(gold) Winner
2015	China Para Badminton International	(China) Cheng Hefang	(Hong Kong) Ng Lai Ling (Japan) Mamiko Toyoda	21–7, 21–10	(gold) Winner
2015	China Para Badminton International	(China) Cheng Hefang	(France) Véronique Braud (Norway) Helle Sofie Sagøy	21–4, 21–5	(gold) Winner
2019	Turkish Para Badminton International	(China) Cheng Hefang	(Japan) Mio Hayashi (Japan) Ayako Suzuki	21–12, 18–21, 16–21	(silver) Runner-up
2019	Dubai Para Badminton International	(China) Cheng Hefang	(Indonesia) Leani Ratri Oktila (Indonesia) Khalimatus Sadiyah	21–8, 12–21, 16–21	(silver) Runner-up
2019	China Para Badminton International	(China) Cheng Hefang	(Japan) Noriko Ito (Japan) Ayako Suzuki	21–8, 21–7	(gold) Winner
2019	Japan Para Badminton International	(China) Cheng Hefang	(Japan) Noriko Ito (Japan) Ayako Suzuki	21–13, 21–8	(gold) Winner
2020	Brazil Para Badminton International	(China) Cheng Hefang	(Indonesia) Leani Ratri Oktila (Indonesia) Khalimatus Sadiyah	15–21, 19–21	(silver) Runner-up
