= Badminton at the 2022 Asian Para Games – Women's singles SL4 =

Badminton's women's singles SL4 at the 2022 Asian Para Games
- Venue: Binjiang Gymnasium, Hangzhou
- Dates: 20 – 26 August 2023
- Competitors: 10 from 6 nations

Medalists
gold medal	Cheng Hefang	China
silver medal	Leani Ratri Oktila	Indonesia
bronze medal	Vaishnavi Puneyani	India
bronze medal	Khalimatus Sadiyah	Indonesia

The women's singles SL4 badminton tournament at the 2022 Asian Para Games is playing from 20 to 26 October 2023 in Binjiang Gymnasium, Hangzhou. A total of 10 players competed at the tournament, three of whom was seeded.

== Competition schedule ==
Plays are taking place between 20 and 26 October 2023.

GS	Group stage	¼	Quarterfinals	½	Semifinals	F	Final

Events	Fri 20	Sat 21	Sun 22	Mon 23	Tue 24	Wed 25	Thu 26	Fri 27
Women's singles SL4	GS	GS		GS	¼	½	F	

== Seeds ==
The following players were seeded:

1. Haruka Fujino (JPN) (quarter-finals)
2. Khalimatus Sadiyah (INA) (semi-finals, bronze medalist)
3. Leani Ratri Oktila (INA) (final, silver medalist)

== Group stage ==
=== Group A ===
Pos	Team	Pld	W	L	GF	GA	GD	PF	PA	PD	Qualification
1	Vaishnavi Puneyani (IND)	2	2	0	4	0	+4	87	39	+48	Qualification to elimination stage
2	Haruka Fujino (JPN) [1]	2	1	1	2	2	0	77	49	+28	Qualification to elimination stage
3	Ayat Machlab (LBN)	2	0	2	0	4	−4	8	84	−76	

Source: Group A – standings

Date		Score		Game 1	Game 2	Game 3
20 Oct	Vaishnavi Puneyani (India)	2–0	(Lebanon) Ayat Machlab	21–4	21–0	
21 Oct	Haruka Fujino (Japan)	0–2	(India) Vaishnavi Puneyani	22–24	13–21	
23 Oct	Haruka Fujino (Japan)	2–0	(Lebanon) Ayat Machlab	21–1	21–3	

=== Group B ===
Pos	Team	Pld	W	L	GF	GA	GD	PF	PA	PD	Qualification
1	Khalimatus Sadiyah (INA) [2]	2	2	0	4	1	+3	103	80	+23	Qualification to elimination stage
2	Shiho Sawada (JPN)	2	1	1	3	2	+1	93	81	+12	Qualification to elimination stage
3	Jyoti Verma (IND)	2	0	2	0	4	−4	49	84	−35	

Source: Group B – standings

Date		Score		Game 1	Game 2	Game 3
20 Oct	Shiho Sawada (Japan)	2–0	(India) Jyoti Verma	21–7	21–13	
21 Oct	Khalimatus Sadiyah (Indonesia)	2–1	(Japan) Shiho Sawada	19–21	21–18	21–12
23 Oct	Khalimatus Sadiyah (Indonesia)	2–0	(India) Jyoti Verma	21–12	21–7	

=== Group C ===
Pos	Team	Pld	W	L	GF	GA	GD	PF	PA	PD	Qualification
1	Cheng Hefang (CHN) (H)	1	1	0	2	0	+2	42	13	+29	Qualification to elimination stage
2	Leani Ratri Oktila (INA) [3]	1	1	0	2	0	+2	42	15	+27	Qualification to elimination stage
3	Chanida Srinavakul (THA)	2	0	2	0	4	−4	28	84	−56	
4	Palak Kohli (IND) (Z)	0	0	0	0	0	0	0	0	0	

Source: Group C – standings
(H) Host; (Z) Withdrew.

Date		Score		Game 1	Game 2	Game 3
20 Oct	Leani Ratri Oktila (Indonesia)	2–0	(Thailand) Chanida Srinavakul	21–9	21–6	
20 Oct	Palak Kohli (India)	w/o	(China) Cheng Hefang	Walkover		
21 Oct	Cheng Hefang (China)	2–0	(Thailand) Chanida Srinavakul	21–7	21–6	
23 Oct	Leani Ratri Oktila (Indonesia)	0–2	(China) Cheng Hefang	8–21	13–21	

== Elimination round ==
Top two ranked in each group qualified to the elimination round, the draw will be decided after the previous round finished.

Quarter-finals
3	Leani Ratri Oktila (INA)	21	21
Shiho Sawada (JPN)	7	12
1	Haruka Fujino (JPN)	11	10
Cheng Hefang (CHN)	21	21

Semi-finals
Vaishnavi Puneyani (IND)	21	11
3	Leani Ratri Oktila (INA)	23	21
Cheng Hefang (CHN)	21	21
2	Khalimatus Sadiyah (INA)	13	11

Final
3	Leani Ratri Oktila (INA)	21	13	12
Cheng Hefang (CHN)	17	21	21
