= Khalimatus Sadiyah =

Indonesian para-badminton player (born 1999)

Personal information
- Born: 17 September 1999 (age 27) Mojokerto, East Java, Indonesia
- Height: 163 cm (5 ft 4 in)
- Weight: 59 kg (130 lb)

Sport
- Country: Indonesia
- Sport: Badminton
- Handedness: Left

Women's singles SL4 Women's doubles SL3–SU5 Mixed doubles SL3–SU5
- Highest ranking: 1 (WD with Leani Ratri Oktila 18 February 2020); 4 (XD with Fredy Setiawan 14 May 2019); 5 (WS 22 October 2019)
- Current ranking: 1 (WD with Leani Ratri Oktila); 6 (XD with Fredy Setiawan); 7 (WS) (18 May 2021)
- BWF profile
Medal record
Women's para-badminton
Representing Indonesia
Paralympic Games
Gold medal – first place	2020 Tokyo	Women's doubles
Silver medal – second place	2024 Paris	Mixed doubles
World Championships
Gold medal – first place	2022 Tokyo	Women's doubles
Gold medal – first place	2022 Tokyo	Mixed doubles
Gold medal – first place	2024 Pattaya	Women's doubles
Silver medal – second place	2019 Basel	Women's doubles
Silver medal – second place	2024 Pattaya	Mixed doubles
Silver medal – second place	2026 Manama	Women's doubles
Bronze medal – third place	2017 Ulsan	Women's singles
Bronze medal – third place	2017 Ulsan	Women's doubles
Bronze medal – third place	2019 Basel	Women's singles
Bronze medal – third place	2022 Tokyo	Women's singles
Bronze medal – third place	2026 Manama	Women's singles
World Abilitysport Games
Gold medal – first place	2023 Nakhon Ratchasima	Women's doubles
Silver medal – second place	2023 Nakhon Ratchasima	Women's singles
Silver medal – second place	2023 Nakhon Ratchasima	Mixed doubles
Asian Para Games
Gold medal – first place	2018 Jakarta	Women's doubles
Gold medal – first place	2022 Hangzhou	Women's doubles
Silver medal – second place	2014 Incheon	Women's doubles
Silver medal – second place	2022 Hangzhou	Mixed doubles
Bronze medal – third place	2018 Jakarta	Women's singles
Bronze medal – third place	2018 Jakarta	Mixed doubles
Bronze medal – third place	2022 Hangzhou	Women's singles
Bronze medal – third place	2026 Aichi-Nagoya	Women's singles
Bronze medal – third place	2026 Aichi-Nagoya	Women's doubles
Asian Championships
Gold medal – first place	2025 Nakhon Ratchasima	Women's singles
Silver medal – second place	2016 Beijing	Women's singles
Bronze medal – third place	2016 Beijing	Women's doubles
Bronze medal – third place	2025 Nakhon Ratchasima	Mixed doubles
ASEAN Para Games
Gold medal – first place	2015 Singapore	Women's doubles
Gold medal – first place	2017 Kuala Lumpur	Women's doubles
Gold medal – first place	2022 Surakarta	Women's singles
Gold medal – first place	2022 Surakarta	Mixed doubles
Gold medal – first place	2023 Cambodia	Women's doubles
Silver medal – second place	2015 Singapore	Women's singles
Silver medal – second place	2017 Kuala Lumpur	Women's singles
Silver medal – second place	2017 Kuala Lumpur	Mixed doubles
Silver medal – second place	2022 Surakarta	Women's doubles
Silver medal – second place	2023 Cambodia	Women's singles
Silver medal – second place	2023 Cambodia	Mixed doubles
Bronze medal – third place	2015 Singapore	Mixed doubles
Asian Youth Para Games
Gold medal – first place	2017 Dubai	Girls' singles
Gold medal – first place	2017 Dubai	Mixed doubles

Khalimatus Sadiyah (born 17 September 1999) is an Indonesian para badminton player. She played each of the three variations of the sport (women's singles, women's doubles, and mixed doubles) at the highest world level. She won the first para-badminton gold medal for Indonesia in the women's doubles SL3–SU5 event of the 2020 Summer Paralympics with Leani Ratri Oktila.

In the junior event, Sadiyah won the gold medals in the girls' singles and mixed doubles at the 2017 Asian Youth Para Games.

== Awards and nominations ==
Award	Year	Category	Result	Ref.
Indonesian Sport Awards	2018	Favorite Female Para Athlete Pairs (with Leani Ratri Oktila)	Won	
Golden Award SIWO PWI	2021	Best Female Para Athlete	Nominated	

== Achievements ==
=== Paralympic Games ===
Women's doubles

Year	Venue	Partner	Opponent	Score	Result
2020	Yoyogi National Gymnasium, Tokyo, Japan	(Indonesia) Leani Ratri Oktila	(China) Cheng Hefang (China) Ma Huihui	21–18, 21–12	Gold

Mixed doubles

Year	Venue	Partner	Opponent	Score	Result
2024	Arena Porte de La Chapelle, Paris, France	(Indonesia) Fredy Setiawan	(Indonesia) Hikmat Ramdani (Indonesia) Leani Ratri Oktila	16–21, 15–21	Silver

=== World Championships ===
Women's singles

Year	Venue	Opponent	Score	Result
2017	Dongchun Gymnasium, Ulsan, South Korea	(Indonesia) Leani Ratri Oktila	14–21, 9–21	Bronze
2019	St. Jakobshalle, Basel, Switzerland	(China) Cheng Hefang	7–21, 9–21	Bronze
2022	Yoyogi National Gymnasium, Tokyo, Japan	(Japan) Haruka Fujino	15–21, 21–12, 13–21	Bronze
2026	Isa Sports City, Manama, Bahrain	(China) Huang Zixuan	14–21, 14–21	Bronze

Women's doubles

Year	Venue	Partner	Opponent	Score	Result
2017	Dongchun Gymnasium, Ulsan, South Korea	(Indonesia) Leani Ratri Oktila	(China) Cheng Hefang (China) Ma Huihui	12–21, 19–21	Bronze
2019	St. Jakobshalle, Basel, Switzerland	(Indonesia) Leani Ratri Oktila	(China) Cheng Hefang (China) Ma Huihui	17–21, 12–21	Silver
2022	Yoyogi National Gymnasium, Tokyo, Japan	(Indonesia) Leani Ratri Oktila	(France) Lénaïg Morin (France) Faustine Noël	21–14, 16–21, 21–13	Gold
2024	Pattaya Exhibition and Convention Hall, Pattaya, Thailand	(Indonesia) Leani Ratri Oktila	(India) Manasi Joshi (India) Thulasimathi Murugesan	22–20, 21–17	Gold
2026	Isa Sports City, Manama, Bahrain	(Indonesia) Leani Ratri Oktila	(China) Xiao Zuxian (China) Yang Qiuxia	19–21, 12–21	Silver

Mixed doubles

Year	Venue	Partner	Opponent	Score	Result
2022	Yoyogi National Gymnasium, Tokyo, Japan	(Indonesia) Fredy Setiawan	(Thailand) Siripong Teamarrom (Thailand) Nipada Saensupa	21–15, 21–12	Gold
2024	Pattaya Exhibition and Convention Hall, Pattaya, Thailand	(Indonesia) Fredy Setiawan	(Indonesia) Hikmat Ramdani (Indonesia) Leani Ratri Oktila	9–21, 16–21	Silver

=== World Abilitysport Games ===
Women's singles

Year	Venue	Opponent	Score	Result
2023	Terminal 21 Korat Hall, Nakhon Ratchasima, Thailand	(Indonesia) Leani Ratri Oktila	12–21, 10–21	Silver

Women’s doubles

Year	Venue	Partner	Opponent	Score	Result
2023 (Note: This tournament uses a round robin system.)	Terminal 21 Korat Hall, Nakhon Ratchasima, Thailand	(Indonesia) Leani Ratri Oktila	(Indonesia) Qonitah Ikhtiar Syakuroh (Thailand) Wathini Naramitkornburee	21–11, 21–17	Gold
2023	Terminal 21 Korat Hall, Nakhon Ratchasima, Thailand	(Indonesia) Leani Ratri Oktila	(India) Amudha Saravanan (India) Riddhi Pradipkumar Thacker	21–6, 21–6	Gold
2023	Terminal 21 Korat Hall, Nakhon Ratchasima, Thailand	(Indonesia) Leani Ratri Oktila	(Thailand) Nutvara Patitus (Thailand) Wandee Kamtam	21–7, 21–6	Gold

Mixed doubles

Year	Venue	Partner	Opponent	Score	Result
2023	Terminal 21 Korat, Nakhon Ratchasima, Thailand	(Indonesia) Fredy Setiawan	(Indonesia) Hikmat Ramdani (Indonesia) Leani Ratri Oktila	8–21, 19–21	Silver

=== Asian Para Games ===
Women's singles

Year	Venue	Opponent	Score	Result
2018	Istora Gelora Bung Karno, Jakarta, Indonesia	(Indonesia) Leani Ratri Oktila	7–21, 8–21	Bronze
2022	Binjiang Gymnasium, Hangzhou, China	(China) Cheng Hefang	13–21, 11–21	Bronze
2026	Ichinomiya City Municipal Gymnasium, Ichinomiya, Japan	(Indonesia) Leani Ratri Oktila	8–21, 6–21	Bronze

Women's doubles

Year	Venue	Partner	Opponent	Score	Result
2014 (Note: This tournament uses a round robin system.)	Gyeyang Gymnasium, Incheon, South Korea	(Indonesia) Leani Ratri Oktila	(Japan) Noriko Ito (Japan) Akiko Sugino	21–17, 18–21, 19–21	Silver
2014	Gyeyang Gymnasium, Incheon, South Korea	(Indonesia) Leani Ratri Oktila	(Thailand) Wandee Kamtam (Thailand) Sudsaifon Yodpa	21–8, 21–16	Silver
2014	Gyeyang Gymnasium, Incheon, South Korea	(Indonesia) Leani Ratri Oktila	(China) Cheng Hefang (China) Ma Huihui	10–21, 16–21	Silver
2014	Gyeyang Gymnasium, Incheon, South Korea	(Indonesia) Leani Ratri Oktila	(Thailand) Nipada Saensupa (Thailand) Chanida Srinavakul	21–10, 21–7	Silver
2018	Istora Gelora Bung Karno, Jakarta, Indonesia	(Indonesia) Leani Ratri Oktila	(China) Cheng Hefang (China) Ma Huihui	21–15, 21–12	Gold
2022	Binjiang Gymnasium, Hangzhou, China	(Indonesia) Leani Ratri Oktila	(India) Manasi Joshi (India) Thulasimathi Murugesan	21–16, 13–21, 21–14	Gold
2026	Ichinomiya City Municipal Gymnasium, Ichinomiya, Japan	(Indonesia) Leani Ratri Oktila	(China) Xiao Zuxian (China) Yang Qiuxia	19–21, 21–19, 17–21	Bronze

Mixed doubles

Year	Venue	Partner	Opponent	Score	Result
2018	Istora Gelora Bung Karno, Jakarta, Indonesia	(Indonesia) Hikmat Ramdani	(Indonesia) Hary Susanto (Indonesia) Leani Ratri Oktila	17–21, 9–21	Bronze
2022	Binjiang Gymnasium, Hangzhou, China	(Indonesia) Fredy Setiawan	(Indonesia) Hikmat Ramdani (Indonesia) Leani Ratri Oktila	7–21, 8–21	Silver

=== Asian Championships ===
Women's singles

Year	Venue	Opponent	Score	Result	Ref
2016	China Administration of Sport for Persons with Disabilities, Beijing, China	(China) Ma Huihui	21–16, 16–21, 11–21	Silver	
2025	SPADT Convention Center, Nakhon Ratchasima, Thailand	(India) Palak Kohli	14–21, 21–18, 12–10 Retired	Gold	

Women's doubles

Year	Venue	Partner	Opponent	Score	Result
2016 (Note: This tournament uses a round robin system.)	China Administration of Sport for Persons with Disabilities, Beijing, China	(India) Parul Parmar	(India) Chiranjita Bharali (India) Manasi Joshi	21–9, 21–10	Bronze
2016	China Administration of Sport for Persons with Disabilities, Beijing, China	(India) Parul Parmar	(China) Cheng Hefang (China) Ma Huihui	11–21, 4–21	Bronze
2016	China Administration of Sport for Persons with Disabilities, Beijing, China	(India) Parul Parmar	(Japan) Akiko Sugino (Japan) Asami Yamada	15–21^{r}	Bronze

Mixed doubles

Year	Venue	Partner	Opponent	Score	Result	Ref
2025	SPADT Convention Center, Nakhon Ratchasima, Thailand	(Indonesia) Fredy Setiawan	(India) Ruthick Ragupathi (India) Manasi Joshi	21–19, 14–21, 22–24	Bronze	

=== ASEAN Para Games ===
Women's singles

Year	Venue	Opponent	Score	Result
2015	OCBC Arena, Singapore	(Indonesia) Leani Ratri Oktila	12–21, 14–21	Silver
2017	Axiata Arena, Kuala Lumpur, Malaysia	(Indonesia) Leani Ratri Oktila	7–21, 12–21	Silver
2022 (Note: This tournament uses a round robin system.)	Edutorium Muhammadiyah University of Surakarta, Surakarta, Indonesia	(Indonesia) Qonitah Ikhtiar Syakuroh	21–14, 21–7	Gold
2022	Edutorium Muhammadiyah University of Surakarta, Surakarta, Indonesia	(Thailand) Chanida Srinavakul	21–14, 21–8	Gold
2022	Edutorium Muhammadiyah University of Surakarta, Surakarta, Indonesia	(Indonesia) Lia Priyanti	21–10, 21–15	Gold
2022	Edutorium Muhammadiyah University of Surakarta, Surakarta, Indonesia	(Thailand) Samownkorn Photisuppaiboon	21–12, 21–9	Gold

Women's doubles

Year	Venue	Partner	Opponent	Score	Result
2015 (Note: This tournament uses a round robin system.)	OCBC Arena, Singapore	(Indonesia) Leani Ratri Oktila	(Indonesia) Larti (Indonesia) Sriyanti	21–7, 21–14	Gold
2015	OCBC Arena, Singapore	(Indonesia) Leani Ratri Oktila	(Thailand) Nipada Saensupa (Thailand) Chanida Srinavakul	21–9, 21–11	Gold
2015	OCBC Arena, Singapore	(Indonesia) Leani Ratri Oktila	(Vietnam) Vu Hoai Than (Vietnam) Doan Thi Ngai	21–11, 21–15	Gold
2015	OCBC Arena, Singapore	(Indonesia) Leani Ratri Oktila	(Thailand) Wanndee Kamtam (Thailand) Sudsaifon Yodpha	21–14, 21–15	Gold
2017 (Note: This tournament uses a round robin system.)	Axiata Arena, Kuala Lumpur, Malaysia	(Indonesia) Leani Ratri Oktila	(Malaysia) Nabilah Ahmat Sharif (Malaysia) Nursyazwani Binti Shahrom	21–5, 21–8	Gold
2017	Axiata Arena, Kuala Lumpur, Malaysia	(Indonesia) Leani Ratri Oktila	(Thailand) Nipada Saensupa (Thailand) Chanida Srinavakul	21–17, 21–5	Gold
2017	Axiata Arena, Kuala Lumpur, Malaysia	(Indonesia) Leani Ratri Oktila	(Vietnam) Nguyen Thi Hong Tuoi (Vietnam) Vu Hoai Than	21–4, 21–3	Gold
2017	Axiata Arena, Kuala Lumpur, Malaysia	(Indonesia) Leani Ratri Oktila	(Thailand) Darunee Henpraiwan (Thailand) Nisa Kaeokhunnok	21–5, 21–6	Gold
2022 (Note: This tournament uses a round robin system.)	Edutorium Muhammadiyah University of Surakarta, Surakarta, Indonesia	(Indonesia) Lia Priyanti	(Indonesia) Qonitah Ikhtiar Syakuroh (Indonesia) Warining Rahayu	21–17, 20–22, 14–21	Silver
2022	Edutorium Muhammadiyah University of Surakarta, Surakarta, Indonesia	(Indonesia) Lia Priyanti	(Thailand) Darunee Henpraiwan (Thailand) Wathini Naramitkornburee	21–14, 21–15	Silver
2022	Edutorium Muhammadiyah University of Surakarta, Surakarta, Indonesia	(Indonesia) Lia Priyanti	(Thailand) Nipada Saensupa (Thailand) Chanida Srinavakul	21–14, 21–12	Silver
2023 (Note: This tournament uses a round robin system.)	Morodok Techo Badminton Hall, Phnom Penh, Cambodia	(Indonesia) Leani Ratri Oktila	(Indonesia) Lia Priyanti (Indonesia) Qonitah Ikhtiar Syakuroh	21–6, 21–14	Gold
2023	Morodok Techo Badminton Hall, Phnom Penh, Cambodia	(Indonesia) Leani Ratri Oktila	(Thailand) Wandee Kamtam (Thailand) Wathini Naramitkornburee	21–14, 21–5	Gold
2023	Morodok Techo Badminton Hall, Phnom Penh, Cambodia	(Indonesia) Leani Ratri Oktila	(Thailand) Chanida Srinavakul (Thailand) Nipada Saensupa	21–16, 21–14	Gold

Mixed doubles

Year	Venue	Partner	Opponent	Score	Result
2015	OCBC Arena, Singapore	(Indonesia) Hary Susanto	(Indonesia) Fredy Setiawan (Indonesia) Leani Ratri Oktila	21–11, 21–11	Bronze
2017	Axiata Arena, Kuala Lumpur, Malaysia	(Indonesia) Fredy Setiawan	(Indonesia) Hary Susanto (Indonesia) Leani Ratri Oktila	11–21, 13–21	Silver
2022 (Note: This tournament uses a round robin system.)	Edutorium Muhammadiyah University of Surakarta, Surakarta, Indonesia	(Indonesia) Fredy Setiawan	(Indonesia) Khoirur Roziqin (Indonesia) Warining Rahayu	21–9, 21–14	Gold
2022	Edutorium Muhammadiyah University of Surakarta, Surakarta, Indonesia	(Indonesia) Fredy Setiawan	(Thailand) Siripong Teamarrom (Thailand) Nipada Saensupa	21–11, 26–24	Gold
2022	Edutorium Muhammadiyah University of Surakarta, Surakarta, Indonesia	(Indonesia) Fredy Setiawan	(Thailand) Pricha Somsiri (Thailand) Darunee Henpraiwan	walkover	Gold
2023	Morodok Techo Badminton Hall, Phnom Penh, Cambodia	(Indonesia) Fredy Setiawan	(Indonesia) Hikmat Ramdani (Indonesia) Leani Ratri Oktila	15–21, 19–21	Silver

=== Asian Youth Para Games ===
Girls' singles

Year	Venue	Opponent	Score	Result
2017 (Note: This tournament uses a round robin system.)	Al Wasl Club, Dubai, United Arab Emirates	(United Arab Emirates) Salama Alkhateri	walkover	Gold
2017	Al Wasl Club, Dubai, United Arab Emirates	(Thailand) Samownkorn Photisuppaiboon	21–11, 21–5	Gold
2017	Al Wasl Club, Dubai, United Arab Emirates	(Indonesia) Adinda Nugraheni	21–8, 21–4	Gold

Mixed doubles

Year	Venue	Partner	Opponent	Score	Result
2017 (Note: This tournament uses a round robin system.)	Al Wasl Club, Dubai, United Arab Emirates	(Indonesia) Hikmat Ramdani	(India) Mohammad Arwaz Ansari (India) Arati Janoba Patil	21–5, 21–4	Gold
2017	Al Wasl Club, Dubai, United Arab Emirates	(Indonesia) Hikmat Ramdani	(United Arab Emirates) Humaid Alsanani (United Arab Emirates) Salama Alkhateri	walkover	Gold

=== BWF Para Badminton World Circuit (15 titles, 19 runners-up) ===
The BWF Para Badminton World Circuit – Grade 2, Level 1, 2 and 3 tournaments has been sanctioned by the Badminton World Federation from 2022.

Women's singles

Year	Tournament	Level	Opponent	Score	Result	Ref
2022	Dubai Para Badminton International	Level 2	(Japan) Haruka Fujino	21–13, 21–18	(gold) Winner	
2022 (Note: This tournament uses a round robin system.)	Indonesia Para Badminton International	Level 3	(Indonesia) Warining Rahayu	12–21, 11–21	(silver) Runner-up	
2022	Indonesia Para Badminton International	Level 3	(Indonesia) Lia Priyanti	21–15, 21–9	(silver) Runner-up	
2022	Indonesia Para Badminton International	Level 3	(Australia) Caitlin Dransfield	21–15, 21–15	(silver) Runner-up	
2022	Indonesia Para Badminton International	Level 3	(India) Koshika Devda	21–19, 21–14	(silver) Runner-up	
2023	Canada Para Badminton International	Level 1	(Japan) Haruka Fujino	19–21, 18–21	(silver) Runner-up	
2025	Thailand Para Badminton International	Level 2	(India) Palak Kohli	21–14, 21–18	(gold) Winner	

Women's doubles

Year	Tournament	Level	Partner	Opponent	Score	Result	Ref
2022 (Note: This tournament uses a round robin system.)	Indonesia Para Badminton International	Level 3	(Indonesia) Lia Priyanti	(Indonesia) Warining Rahayu (Indonesia) Qonitah Ikhtiar Syakuroh	25–23, 13–21, 10–21	(silver) Runner-up	
2022	Indonesia Para Badminton International	Level 3	(Indonesia) Lia Priyanti	(Australia) Caitlin Dransfield (Australia) Amonrat Jamporn	21–5, 21–5	(silver) Runner-up	
2022	Indonesia Para Badminton International	Level 3	(Indonesia) Lia Priyanti	(India) Koshika Devda (India) Neeraj	21–3, 21–8	(silver) Runner-up	
2023	Spanish Para Badminton International	Level 2	(Indonesia) Leani Ratri Oktila	(India) Manasi Joshi (India) Shanthiya Viswanathan	21–9, 21–9	(gold) Winner	
2023	Thailand Para Badminton International	Level 2	(Indonesia) Leani Ratri Oktila	(China) Xiao Zuxian (China) Yang Qiuxia	16–21, 21–8, 18–21	(silver) Runner-up	
2023	Bahrain Para Badminton International	Level 2	(Indonesia) Leani Ratri Oktila	(India) Manasi Joshi (India) Thulasimathi Murugesan	21–19, 19–21, 21–10	(gold) Winner	
2023	Canada Para Badminton International	Level 1	(Indonesia) Leani Ratri Oktila	(India) Manasi Joshi (India) Thulasimathi Murugesan	21–9, 23–25, 22–24	(silver) Runner-up	
2023	4 Nations Para Badminton International	Level 1	(Indonesia) Leani Ratri Oktila	(India) Manasi Joshi (India) Thulasimathi Murugesan	18–21, 22–20, 12–21	(silver) Runner-up	
2023	Indonesia Para Badminton International	Level 3	(Indonesia) Leani Ratri Oktila	(Turkey) Tuğçe Çelik (India) Vaishnavi Puneyani	21–18, 21–15	(gold) Winner	
2023	Western Australia Para Badminton International	Level 2	(Indonesia) Leani Ratri Oktila	(India) Manasi Joshi (India) Thulasimathi Murugesan	22–24, 21–19, 21–17	(gold) Winner	
2023	Japan Para Badminton International	Level 2	(Indonesia) Leani Ratri Oktila	(India) Manasi Joshi (India) Thulasimathi Murugesan	16–21, 11–21	(silver) Runner-up	
2023	Dubai Para Badminton International	Level 2	(Indonesia) Leani Ratri Oktila	(India) Manasi Joshi (India) Thulasimathi Murugesan	21–15, 14–21, 6–21	(silver) Runner-up	
2024	Indonesia Para Badminton International	Level 2	(Indonesia) Leani Ratri Oktila	(Indonesia) Qonitah Ikhtiar Syakuroh (Indonesia) Warining Rahayu	21–8, 21–6	(gold) Winner	
2025	British & Irish Para Badminton International	Level 1	(Indonesia) Leani Ratri Oktila	(India) Sanjana Kumari (Portugal) Beatriz Monteiro	21–14, 21–7	(gold) Winner	
2026	French Para Badminton International	Level 2	(Indonesia) Leani Ratri Oktila	(India) Manasi Joshi (India) Thulasimathi Murugesan	21–19, 15–21, 11–21	(silver) Runner-up	
2026	British & Irish Para Badminton International	Level 1	(Indonesia) Leani Ratri Oktila	(India) Manasi Joshi (India) Thulasimathi Murugesan	21–14, 13–21, 21–17	(gold) Winner	
2026	China Para Badminton International	Level 2	(Indonesia) Leani Ratri Oktila	(China) Gu Feifei (China) Moshiniu Qiesha	21–13, 21–16	(gold) Winner	
2026	Japan Para Badminton International	Level 2	(Indonesia) Leani Ratri Oktila	(Brazil) Kauana Michelson Beckenkamp (Brazil) Bruna Danielle Moreira Vasconcellos	22–24, 21–13, 21–7	(gold) Winner	

Mixed doubles

Year	Tournament	Level	Partner	Opponent	Score	Result	Ref
2022	Dubai Para Badminton International	Level 2	(Indonesia) Fredy Setiawan	(Japan) Taiyo Imai (Japan) Noriko Ito	21–11, 18–21, 21–7	(gold) Winner	
2022	Indonesia Para Badminton International	Level 3	(Indonesia) Fredy Setiawan	(Indonesia) Hafizh Briliansyah Prawiranegara (Indonesia) Qonitah Ikhtiar Syakuroh	21–15, 12–21, 21–10	(gold) Winner	
2023	Bahrain Para Badminton International	Level 2	(Indonesia) Fredy Setiawan	(Indonesia) Hikmat Ramdani (Indonesia) Leani Ratri Oktila	7–21, 21–16, 15–21	(silver) Runner-up	
2023	Canada Para Badminton International	Level 1	(Indonesia) Fredy Setiawan	(Indonesia) Hikmat Ramdani (Indonesia) Leani Ratri Oktila	12–21, 21–19, 12–21	(silver) Runner-up	
2023	Indonesia Para Badminton International	Level 3	(Indonesia) Fredy Setiawan	(Indonesia) Hikmat Ramdani (Indonesia) Leani Ratri Oktila	10–21, 17–21	(silver) Runner-up	
2023	Western Australia Para Badminton International	Level 2	(Indonesia) Fredy Setiawan	(India) Kumar Nitesh (India) Thulasimathi Murugesan	21–15, 20–22, 19–21	(silver) Runner-up	
2023	Japan Para Badminton International	Level 2	(Indonesia) Fredy Setiawan	(Indonesia) Hikmat Ramdani (Indonesia) Leani Ratri Oktila	15–21, 13–21	(silver) Runner-up	
2024	4 Nations Para Badminton International	Level 1	(Indonesia) Fredy Setiawan	(Indonesia) Hikmat Ramdani (Indonesia) Leani Ratri Oktila	9–21, 11–21	(silver) Runner-up	
2024	Indonesia Para Badminton International	Level 2	(Indonesia) Fredy Setiawan	(Indonesia) Hikmat Ramdani (Indonesia) Leani Ratri Oktila	12–21, 10–21	(silver) Runner-up	
2024	Bahrain Para Badminton International	Level 1	(Indonesia) Fredy Setiawan	(Indonesia) Hikmat Ramdani (Indonesia) Leani Ratri Oktila	6–21, 9–21	(silver) Runner-up	
2025	Thailand Para Badminton International	Level 2	(Indonesia) Fredy Setiawan	(India) Abhijeet Sakhuja (India) Palak Kohli	21–11, 21–14	(gold) Winner	
2025	British & Irish Para Badminton International	Level 1	(Indonesia) Fredy Setiawan	(Brazil) Rogério de Oliveira (Brazil) Edwarda Dias	21–10, 21–5	(gold) Winner	
2025	Indonesia Para Badminton International	Level 1	(Indonesia) Fredy Setiawan	(Indonesia) Hikmat Ramdani (Indonesia) Leani Ratri Oktila	6–21, 9–21	(silver) Runner-up	
2026	British & Irish Para Badminton International	Level 1	(Indonesia) Fredy Setiawan	(Indonesia) Hikmat Ramdani (Indonesia) Leani Ratri Oktila	4–21, 15–21	(silver) Runner-up	

=== International Tournaments (14 titles, 5 runners-up) ===
Women's singles

Year	Tournament	Opponent	Score	Result
2014	Indonesia Para-Badminton International	(Indonesia) Leani Ratri Oktila	8–21, 12–21	(silver) Runner-up
2015	Indonesia Para-Badminton International	(Indonesia) Leani Ratri Oktila	21–8, 21–10	(silver) Runner-up
2018	Australian Para-Badminton International	(Scotland) Mary Margaret Wilson	21–8, 21–5	(gold) Winner

Women's doubles

Year	Tournament	Partner	Opponent	Score	Result
2014	Indonesia Para-Badminton International	(Indonesia) Leani Ratri Oktila	(Thailand) Nipada Saensupa (Thailand) Chanida Srinavakul	21–13, 21–16	(gold) Winner
2015	Indonesia Para-Badminton International	(Indonesia) Leani Ratri Oktila	(Thailand) Wanndee Kamtam (Japan) Mamiko Toyoda	21–7, 21–19	(gold) Winner
2016	Indonesia Para-Badminton International	(Indonesia) Leani Ratri Oktila	(Thailand) Nipada Saensupa (Thailand) Chanida Srinavakul	21–19, 21–14	(gold) Winner
2018	Irish Para-Badminton International	(Indonesia) Leani Ratri Oktila	(Norway) Helle Sofie Sagøy (Germany) Katrin Seibert	21–16, 21–9	(gold) Winner
2018	Thailand Para-Badminton International	(Indonesia) Leani Ratri Oktila	(Thailand) Nipada Saensupa (Thailand) Chanida Srinavakul	21–9, 21–8	(gold) Winner
2018	Australian Para-Badminton International	(Indonesia) Leani Ratri Oktila	(Japan) Noriko Ito (Japan) Ayako Suzuki	21–12, 21–14	(gold) Winner
2019	Dubai Para-Badminton International	(Indonesia) Leani Ratri Oktila	(China) Cheng Hefang (China) Ma Huihui	8–21, 21–12, 21–16	(gold) Winner
2019	Canada Para-Badminton International	(Indonesia) Leani Ratri Oktila	(Japan) Noriko Ito (Japan) Ayako Suzuki	21–13, 21–18	(gold) Winner
2019	Irish Para-Badminton International	(Indonesia) Leani Ratri Oktila	(France) Lenaig Morin (France) Faustine Noël	21–11, 21–18	(gold) Winner
2020	Brazil Para-Badminton International	(Indonesia) Leani Ratri Oktila	(China) Cheng Hefang (China) Ma Huihui	21–15, 21–19	(gold) Winner
2021	Dubai Para-Badminton International	(Indonesia) Leani Ratri Oktila	(France) Lenaig Morin (France) Faustine Noël	21–15, 21–16	(gold) Winner

Mixed doubles

Year	Tournament	Partner	Opponent	Score	Result
2014	Indonesia Para-Badminton International	(Indonesia) Suryo Nugroho	(Indonesia) Fredy Setiawan (Indonesia) Leani Ratri Oktila	21–19, 21–17	(gold) Winner
2016	Indonesia Para-Badminton International	(Indonesia) Hary Susanto	(Indonesia) Fredy Setiawan (Indonesia) Leani Ratri Oktila	13–21, 16–21	(silver) Runner-up
2018	Irish Para-Badminton International	(Indonesia) Fredy Setiawan	(Indonesia) Hary Susanto (Indonesia) Leani Ratri Oktila	5–21, 15–21	(silver) Runner-up
2018	Thailand Para-Badminton International	(Indonesia) Fredy Setiawan	(Indonesia) Hary Susanto (Indonesia) Leani Ratri Oktila	5–21, 10–21	(silver) Runner-up
2019	China Para-Badminton International	(Indonesia) Fredy Setiawan	(Thailand) Siripong Teamarrom (Thailand) Nipada Saensupa	18–21, 21–16, 21–9	(gold) Winner
