= Noriko Ito =

Japanese para-badminton player (born 1976)

Noriko Ito 伊藤 則子
Personal information
- Born: 18 May 1976 (age 50) Aichi Prefecture, Japan

Sport
- Country: Japan
- Sport: Badminton

Women's singles SL3 Women's doubles SL3–SU5 Mixed doubles SL3–SU5
- Highest ranking: 4 (WS 1 January 2019); 3 (WD with Ayako Suzuki 29 August 2019); 2 (XD with Taiyo Imai 4 July 2022)
- Current ranking: 6 (WS); 4 (XD with Taiyo Imai) (8 November 2022)
Medal record
Women's para-badminton
Representing Japan
Paralympic Games
Bronze medal – third place	2020 Tokyo	Women's doubles
World Championships
Bronze medal – third place	2017 Ulsan	Women's doubles
Bronze medal – third place	2019 Basel	Women's doubles
Asian Para Games
Bronze medal – third place	2014 Incheon	Women's doubles

Noriko Ito (伊藤 則子, Ito Noriko; born 18 May 1976) is a Japanese para-badminton player. She competed at the 2020 Summer Paralympics in the badminton competition, winning the bronze medal in the women's doubles SL3–SU5 event with her teammate, Ayako Suzuki.

== Achievements ==
=== Paralympic Games ===
Women's doubles

Year	Venue	Partner	Opponent	Score	Result
2020	Yoyogi National Gymnasium, Tokyo, Japan	(Japan) Ayako Suzuki	(France) Lénaïg Morin (France) Faustine Noël	21–16, 21–18	Bronze

=== World Championships ===
Women's doubles

Year	Venue	Partner	Opponent	Score	Result
2017	Dongchun Gymnasium, Ulsan, South Korea	(Japan) Mamiko Toyoda	(India) Parul Parmar (Japan) Akiko Sugino	5–21, 10–21	Bronze
2019	St. Jakobshalle, Basel, Switzerland	(Japan) Ayako Suzuki	(Indonesia) Leani Ratri Oktila (Indonesia) Khalimatus Sadiyah	15–21, 11–21	Bronze

=== Asian Para Games ===
Women's doubles

Year	Venue	Partner	Opponent	Score	Result
2014 (Note: This tournament uses a round robin system.)	Gyeyang Gymnasium, Incheon, South Korea	(Japan) Akiko Sugino	(Indonesia) Leani Ratri Oktila (Indonesia) Khalimatus Sadiyah	17–21, 21–18, 21–19	Bronze
2014	Gyeyang Gymnasium, Incheon, South Korea	(Japan) Akiko Sugino	(Thailand) Nipada Saensupa (Thailand) Chanida Srinavakul	21–19, 14–21, 22–24	Bronze
2014	Gyeyang Gymnasium, Incheon, South Korea	(Japan) Akiko Sugino	(China) Cheng Hefang (China) Ma Huihui	11–21, 12–21	Bronze
2014	Gyeyang Gymnasium, Incheon, South Korea	(Japan) Akiko Sugino	(Thailand) Wandee Kamtam (Thailand) Sudsaifon Yodpa	17–21, 21–9, 21–6	Bronze

=== BWF Para Badminton World Circuit (1 title, 1 runner-up) ===
The BWF Para Badminton World Circuit – Grade 2, Level 1, 2 and 3 tournaments has been sanctioned by the Badminton World Federation from 2022.

Mixed doubles

Year	Tournament	Level	Partner	Opponent	Score	Result
2022	Dubai Para Badminton International	Level 2	(Japan) Taiyo Imai	(Indonesia) Fredy Setiawan (Indonesia) Khalimatus Sadiyah	11–21, 21–18, 7–21	(silver) Runner-up
2022	Canada Para Badminton International	Level 1	(Japan) Taiyo Imai	(Japan) Daisuke Fujihara (Japan) Akiko Sugino	21–16, 21–10	(gold) Winner

=== International Tournaments (3 titles, 7 runners-up) ===
Women's singles

Year	Tournament	Opponent	Score	Result
2018 (Note: This tournament uses a round robin system.)	Brazil Para Badminton International	(Chile) Araceli Bernarda	21–2, 21–3	(gold) Winner
2018	Brazil Para Badminton International	(Japan) Asami Yamada	21–16, 21–15	(gold) Winner
2018	Brazil Para Badminton International	(Brazil) Abinaecia Maria da Silva	21–3, 21–11	(gold) Winner
2018	Brazil Para Badminton International	(Brazil) Maraisa Santos	21–1, 21–4	(gold) Winner
2018	Japan Para Badminton International	(India) Manasi Girishchandra Joshi	21–16, 18–21, 3–21	(silver) Runner-up
2018	Australia Para Badminton International	(India) Manasi Girishchandra Joshi	13–21, 12–21	(silver) Runner-up

Women's doubles

Year	Tournament	Partner	Opponent	Score	Result
2018	Brazil Para Badminton International	(Japan) Akiko Sugino	(Brazil) Abinaecia Maria da Silva (Japan) Mamiko Toyoda	20–22, 21–17, 19–21	(silver) Runner-up
2018	Australia Para Badminton International	(Japan) Akiko Sugino	(Indonesia) Leani Ratri Oktila (Indonesia) Khalimatus Sadiyah	17–21, 8–21	(silver) Runner-up
2019	Canada Para Badminton International	(Japan) Ayako Suzuki	(Indonesia) Leani Ratri Oktila (Indonesia) Khalimatus Sadiyah	13–21, 18–21	(silver) Runner-up
2019	Thailand Para Badminton International	(Japan) Ayako Suzuki	(Thailand) Nipada Saensupa (Thailand) Chanida Srinavakul	21–15, 21–12	(gold) Winner
2019	China Para Badminton International	(Japan) Ayako Suzuki	(China) Cheng Hefang (China) Ma Huihui	8–21, 7–21	(silver) Runner-up
2019	Denmark Para Badminton International	(Japan) Ayako Suzuki	(Japan) Kaede Kameyama (Japan) Asami Yamada	21–11, 21–13	(gold) Winner
2019	Japan Para Badminton International	(Japan) Ayako Suzuki	(China) Cheng Hefang (China) Ma Huihui	13–21, 8–21	(silver) Runner-up
