= Badminton at the 2020 Summer Paralympics – Women's doubles SL3–SU5 =

Women's doubles SL3–SU5 at the XVI Paralympic Games
- Venue: Yoyogi National Gymnasium
- Dates: 2–4 September 2021
- Competitors: 12 from 6 nations

Medalists
1st place, gold medalist(s)		Leani Ratri Oktila; Khalimatus Sadiyah	Indonesia
2nd place, silver medalist(s)		Cheng Hefang; Ma Huihui	China
3rd place, bronze medalist(s)		Noriko Ito; Ayako Suzuki	Japan

The women's doubles SL3–SU5 tournament at the 2020 Summer Paralympics in Tokyo took place between 2 and 4 September 2021 at Yoyogi National Gymnasium.

== Seeds ==
These were the seeds for this event:

1. Leani Ratri Oktila / Khalimatus Sadiyah (INA) (gold medalists)
2. Cheng Hefang / Ma Huihui (CHN) (silver medalists)

== Group stage ==
The draw of the group stage revealed on 26 August 2021. The group stage was played from 2 to 3 September. The top two winners of each group advanced to the knockout rounds.

=== Group A ===
Pos	Team	Pld	W	L	GF	GA	GD	PF	PA	PD	Pts	Qualification
1	Leani Ratri Oktila (INA) (SL4) Khalimatus Sadiyah (INA) (SL4)	2	2	0	4	0	+4	84	34	+50	2	Advance to semi-finals
2	Noriko Ito (JPN) (SL3) Ayako Suzuki (JPN) (SU5) (H)	2	1	1	2	2	0	54	70	−16	1	Advance to semi-finals
3	Nipada Saensupa (THA) (SL4) Chanida Srinavakul (THA) (SL4)	2	0	2	0	4	−4	50	84	−34	0	

Source: TOCOG
(H) Host

Date	Time	Player 1	Score	Player 2	Set 1	Set 2	Set 3
2 Sep	09:00	Leani Ratri Oktila (Indonesia); Khalimatus Sadiyah (Indonesia)	2–0	(Thailand) Nipada Saensupa (Thailand) Chanida Srinavakul	21–9	21–13	
3 Sep	09:00	Noriko Ito (Japan); Ayako Suzuki (Japan)	2–0	(Thailand) Nipada Saensupa (Thailand) Chanida Srinavakul	21–11	21–17	
3 Sep	16:00	Leani Ratri Oktila (Indonesia); Khalimatus Sadiyah (Indonesia)	2–0	(Japan) Noriko Ito (Japan) Ayako Suzuki	21–4	21–8	

=== Group B ===
Pos	Team	Pld	W	L	GF	GA	GD	PF	PA	PD	Pts	Qualification
1	Cheng Hefang (CHN) (SL4) Ma Huihui (CHN) (SL4)	2	2	0	4	0	+4	84	31	+53	2	Advance to Semi-finals
2	Lénaïg Morin (FRA) (SL4) Faustine Noël (FRA) (SL4)	2	1	1	2	2	0	62	74	−12	1	Advance to Semi-finals
3	Palak Kohli (IND) (SU5) Parul Parmar (IND) (SL3)	2	0	2	0	4	−4	44	85	−41	0	

Source: TOCOG

Date	Time	Player 1	Score	Player 2	Set 1	Set 2	Set 3
2 Sep	09:00	Cheng Hefang (China); Ma Huihui (China)	2–0	(India) Palak Kohli (India) Parul Parmar	21–7	21–5	
3 Sep	09:00	Lénaïg Morin (France); Faustine Noël (France)	2–0	(India) Palak Kohli (India) Parul Parmar	21–12	22–20	
3 Sep	16:00	Cheng Hefang (China); Ma Huihui (China)	2–0	(France) Lénaïg Morin (France) Faustine Noël	21–9	21–10	

== Finals ==
The knockout stage was played on 4 September.

Semi-finals
A1	Leani Ratri Oktila (INA); Khalimatus Sadiyah (INA)	21	21
B2	Lénaïg Morin (FRA); Faustine Noël (FRA)	9	15
A2	Noriko Ito (JPN); Ayako Suzuki (JPN)	6	12
B1	Cheng Hefang (CHN); Ma Huihui (CHN)	21	21

Gold medal match
A1	Leani Ratri Oktila (INA); Khalimatus Sadiyah (INA) (gold)	21	21
B1	Cheng Hefang (CHN); Ma Huihui (CHN) (silver)	18	12
Bronze medal match
B2	Lénaïg Morin (FRA); Faustine Noël (FRA)	16	18
A2	Noriko Ito (JPN); Ayako Suzuki (JPN) (bronze)	21	21
