= Ayako Suzuki =

Japanese para badminton player (born 1987)

Ayako Suzuki 鈴木 亜弥子
Personal information
- Born: March 14, 1987 (age 39) Koshigaya, Saitama Prefecture, Japan

Sport
- Country: Japan
- Sport: Badminton

Women's singles SU5 Women's doubles SL3–SU5
- Highest ranking: 1 (WS 1 January 2019); 3 (WD with Noriko Ito 29 August 2019)
Medal record
Women's para badminton
Representing Japan
Paralympic Games
Silver medal – second place	2020 Tokyo	Women's singles
Bronze medal – third place	2020 Tokyo	Women's doubles
World Championships
Gold medal – first place	2009 Seoul	Women's singles
Gold medal – first place	2017 Ulsan	Women's singles
Silver medal – second place	2019 Basel	Women's singles
Bronze medal – third place	2019 Ulsan	Women's doubles
Asian Para Games
Gold medal – first place	2010 Guangzhou	Women's singles
Silver medal – second place	2018 Jakarta	Women's singles
Asian Championships
Silver medal – second place	2016 Beijing	Women's singles

Ayako Suzuki (鈴木 亜弥子, Suzuki Ayako; born 14 March 1987) is a Japanese former para badminton player. She participated at the 2020 Summer Paralympics in the badminton competition, being awarded the silver medal in the women's singles SU5 event. Suzuki also participated in the women's doubles SL3–SU5 event, being awarded the bronze medal with her teammate, Noriko Ito.

Suzuki announced her retirement from para-badminton on 4 September 2022.

== Personal life ==
Suzuki was born in Koshigaya, Saitama Prefecture. She was born with a disability that prevented her right arm from rising above her shoulder. She started playing badminton in third grade and eventually competed in able-bodied competitions.

== Achievements ==
=== Paralympic Games ===
Women's singles

Year	Venue	Opponent	Score	Result
2020	Yoyogi National Gymnasium, Tokyo, Japan	(China) Yang Qiuxia	17–21, 9–21	Silver

Women's doubles

Year	Venue	Partner	Opponent	Score	Result
2020	Yoyogi National Gymnasium, Tokyo, Japan	(Japan) Noriko Ito	(France) Lénaïg Morin (France) Faustine Noël	21–16, 21–18	Bronze

=== World Championships ===
Women's singles

Year	Venue	Opponent	Score	Result
2009	Fencing Hall, Seoul, South Korea	(China) Ma Huihui	21–10, 21–3	Gold
2017	Dongchun Gymnasium, Ulsan, South Korea	(China) Yang Qiuxia	18–21, 21–18, 21–18	Gold
2019	St. Jakobshalle, Basel, Switzerland	(China) Yang Qiuxia	21–17, 17–21, 15–21	Silver

Women's doubles

Year	Venue	Partner	Opponent	Score	Result
2019	St. Jakobshalle, Basel, Switzerland	(Japan) Noriko Ito	(Indonesia) Leani Ratri Oktila (Indonesia) Khalimatus Sadiyah	15–21, 11–21	Bronze

=== Asian Para Games ===
Women's singles

Year	Venue	Opponent	Score	Result
2010 (Note: This tournament uses a round robin system.)	Tianhe Gymnasium, Guangzhou, China	(Thailand) Sudsaifon Yodpa	21–6, 21–0	Gold
2010	Tianhe Gymnasium, Guangzhou, China	(China) Su Kunrong	21–9, 21–5	Gold
2010	Tianhe Gymnasium, Guangzhou, China	(Malaysia) Nor Fariha Kamarudin	Walkover	Gold
2010	Tianhe Gymnasium, Guangzhou, China	(China) Chen Xinyun	21–11, 21–13	Gold
2018 (Note: This tournament uses a round robin system.)	Istora Gelora Bung Karno, Jakarta, Indonesia	(Indonesia) Putu Christiani	21–6, 21–6	Silver
2018	Istora Gelora Bung Karno, Jakarta, Indonesia	(Indonesia) Warining Rahayu	21–9, 21–10	Silver
2018	Istora Gelora Bung Karno, Jakarta, Indonesia	(Hong Kong) Lam Tsz Huen	21–2, 21–8	Silver
2018	Istora Gelora Bung Karno, Jakarta, Indonesia	(China) Yang Qiuxia	16–21, 16–21	Silver

=== Asian Championships ===
Women's singles

Year	Venue	Opponent	Score	Result
2016	China Administration of Sport for Persons with Disabilities, Beijing, China	(China) Yang Qiuxia	21–17, 11–21, 9–21	Silver

=== International Tournaments (16 titles, 7 runners-up) ===
Women's singles

Year	Tournament	Opponent	Score	Result
2016	Irish Para Badminton International	(Japan) Mamiko Toyoda	21–19, 21–7	(gold) Winner
2016	Irish Para Badminton International	(Denmark) Julie Thrane	21–14, 21–13	(gold) Winner
2016	Irish Para Badminton International	(England) Abbigale Louize Richards	21–2, 21–3	(gold) Winner
2016	Irish Para Badminton International	(Netherlands) Megan Hollander	21–3, 16–2 retired	(gold) Winner
2016	Indonesia Para Badminton International	(Indonesia) Leani Ratri Oktila	21–15, 21–8	(gold) Winner
2017	Thailand Para Badminton International	(Japan) Mamiko Toyoda	21–14, 21–10	(gold) Winner
2017	Japan Para Badminton International	(China) Yang Qiuxia	8–21, 21–13, 21–18	(gold) Winner
2018	Turkish Para Badminton International	(Japan) Mamiko Toyoda	21–18, 21–15	(gold) Winner
2018	Brazil Para Badminton International	(Japan) Akiko Sugino	21–13, 21–16	(gold) Winner
2018	Japan Para Badminton International	(Japan) Akiko Sugino	21–15, 21–5	(gold) Winner
2018	Australia Para Badminton International	(Indonesia) Leani Ratri Oktila	21–17, 21–18	(gold) Winner
2019	Dubai Para Badminton International	(China) Yang Qiuxia	18–21, 13–21	(silver) Runner-up
2019	Canada Para Badminton International	(Denmark) Cathrine Rosengren	21–14, 21–9	(gold) Winner
2019	Irish Para Badminton International	(Denmark) Cathrine Rosengren	21–13, 21–7	(gold) Winner
2019	Thailand Para Badminton International	(Denmark) Cathrine Rosengren	21–11, 21–12	(gold) Winner
2019	China Para Badminton International	(China) Yang Qiuxia	14–21, 21–19, 19–21	(silver) Runner-up
2019	Denmark Para Badminton International	(Japan) Mamiko Toyoda	Walkover	(gold) Winner
2019	Japan Para Badminton International	(China) Yang Qiuxia	19–21, 20–22	(silver) Runner-up

Women's doubles

Year	Tournament	Partner	Opponent	Score	Result
2018	Japan Para Badminton International	(Japan) Asami Yamada	(Germany) Katrin Seibert (Thailand) Chanida Srinavakul	12–21, 21–16, 21–12	(gold) Winner
2018	Australia Para Badminton International	(Japan) Noriko Ito	(Indonesia) Leani Ratri Oktila (Indonesia) Khalimatus Sadiyah	17–21, 8–21	(silver) Runner-up
2019	Turkish Para Badminton International	(Japan) Mio Hayashi	(China) Cheng Hefang (China) Ma Huihui	12–21, 21–18, 21–16	(gold) Winner
2019	Canada Para Badminton International	(Japan) Noriko Ito	(Indonesia) Leani Ratri Oktila (Indonesia) Khalimatus Sadiyah	13–21, 18–21	(silver) Runner-up
2019	Thailand Para Badminton International	(Japan) Noriko Ito	(Thailand) Nipada Saensupa (Thailand) Chanida Srinavakul	21–15, 21–12	(gold) Winner
2019	China Para Badminton International	(Japan) Noriko Ito	(China) Cheng Hefang (China) Ma Huihui	8–21, 7–21	(silver) Runner-up
2019	Denmark Para Badminton International	(Japan) Noriko Ito	(Japan) Kaede Kameyama (Japan) Asami Yamada	21–11, 21–13	(gold) Winner
2019	Japan Para Badminton International	(Japan) Noriko Ito	(China) Cheng Hefang (China) Ma Huihui	13–21, 8–21	(silver) Runner-up
