= Badminton at the 2020 Summer Paralympics – Women's singles SU5 =

Women's singles SU5 at the XVI Paralympic Games
- Venue: Yoyogi National Gymnasium
- Dates: 1–4 September 2021
- Competitors: 10 from 8 nations

Medalists
1st place, gold medalist(s)		Yang Qiuxia	China
2nd place, silver medalist(s)		Ayako Suzuki	Japan
3rd place, bronze medalist(s)		Akiko Sugino	Japan

The women's singles SU5 tournament at the 2020 Summer Paralympics in Tokyo took place between 1 and 4 September 2021 at Yoyogi National Gymnasium.

== Format ==
10 Players entered the competition, They were divided in 3 Groups (A, B, C). Best 2 group winners got byes to semifinals and the rest group winner and runners up competed in Quarter-finals for 2 semi-finals berths.

== Seeds ==
These were the seeds for this event:

1. Ayako Suzuki (JPN) (silver medalist)
2. Yang Qiuxia (CHN) (gold medalist)
3. Cathrine Rosengren (DEN) (group stage)

== Group stage ==
The draw of the group stage revealed on 26 August 2021. The group stage was played from 1 to 3 September. The top two winners of each group advanced to the knockout rounds.

=== Group A ===
Pos	Team	Pld	W	L	GF	GA	GD	PF	PA	PD	Pts	Qualification
1	Ayako Suzuki (JPN) (H)	2	2	0	4	0	+4	84	31	+53	2	Advance to semi-finals
2	Palak Kohli (IND)	2	1	1	2	2	0	53	72	−19	1	Advance to quarter-finals
3	Zehra Bağlar (TUR)	2	0	2	0	4	−4	50	84	−34	0	

Source: TOCOG
(H) Host

Date	Time	Player 1	Score	Player 2	Set 1	Set 2	Set 3
1 Sep	20:40	Ayako Suzuki (Japan)	2–0	(India) Palak Kohli	21–7	21–4	
2 Sep	13:40	Zehra Bağlar (Turkey)	0–2	(India) Palak Kohli	12–21	18–21	
3 Sep	13:40	Ayako Suzuki (Japan)	2–0	(Turkey) Zehra Bağlar	21–12	21–8	

=== Group B ===
Pos	Team	Pld	W	L	GF	GA	GD	PF	PA	PD	Pts	Qualification
1	Akiko Sugino (JPN) (H)	2	2	0	4	2	+2	119	102	+17	2	Advance to quarter-finals
2	Kaede Kameyama (JPN) (H)	2	1	1	3	2	+1	96	95	+1	1	Advance to quarter-finals
3	Cathrine Rosengren (DEN)	2	0	2	1	4	−3	82	100	−18	0	

Source: TOCOG
(H) Host

Date	Time	Player 1	Score	Player 2	Set 1	Set 2	Set 3
1 Sep	20:40	Kaede Kameyama (Japan)	1–2	(Japan) Akiko Sugino	22–20	15–21	16–21
2 Sep	14:40	Cathrine Rosengren (Denmark)	1–2	(Japan) Akiko Sugino	21–15	13–21	15–21
3 Sep	14:40	Cathrine Rosengren (Denmark)	0–2	(Japan) Kaede Kameyama	20–22	13–21	

=== Group C ===
Pos	Team	Pld	W	L	GF	GA	GD	PF	PA	PD	Pts	Qualification
1	Yang Qiuxia (CHN)	3	3	0	6	0	+6	126	44	+82	3	Advance to semi-finals
2	Beatriz Monteiro (POR)	3	2	1	4	2	+2	103	80	+23	2	Advance to quarter-finals
3	Megan Hollander (NED)	3	1	2	2	4	−2	90	97	−7	1	
4	Ritah Asiimwe (UGA)	3	0	3	0	6	−6	28	126	−98	0	

Source: TOCOG

Date	Time	Player 1	Score	Player 2	Set 1	Set 2	Set 3
1 Sep	18:40	Megan Hollander (Netherlands)	0–2	(Portugal) Beatriz Monteiro	12–21	19–21	
1 Sep	18:40	Yang Qiuxia (China)	2–0	(Uganda) Ritah Asiimwe	21–2	21–6	
2 Sep	13:40	Yang Qiuxia (China)	2–0	(Portugal) Beatriz Monteiro	21–10	21–9	
2 Sep	14:40	Megan Hollander (Netherlands)	2–0	(Uganda) Ritah Asiimwe	21–6	21–7	
3 Sep	13:40	Yang Qiuxia (China)	2–0	(Netherlands) Megan Hollander	21–8	21–9	
3 Sep	14:40	Beatriz Monteiro (Portugal)	2–0	(Uganda) Ritah Asiimwe	21–2	21–5	

== Finals ==
The knockout stage was played from 3 to 4 September.

Quarter-finals
B2	Kaede Kameyama (JPN)	21	21
A2	Palak Kohli (IND)	11	15
C2	Beatriz Monteiro (POR)	5	12
B1	Akiko Sugino (JPN)	21	21

Semi-finals
A1	Ayako Suzuki (JPN)	21	21
B2	Kaede Kameyama (JPN)	2	13
B1	Akiko Sugino (JPN)	11	11
C1	Yang Qiuxia (CHN)	21	21

Gold medal match
A1	Ayako Suzuki (JPN) (silver)	17	9
C1	Yang Qiuxia (CHN) (gold)	21	21
Bronze medal match
B2	Kaede Kameyama (JPN)	16	21	13
B1	Akiko Sugino (JPN) (bronze)	21	6	21
