= Parul Parmar =

Indian para-badminton player

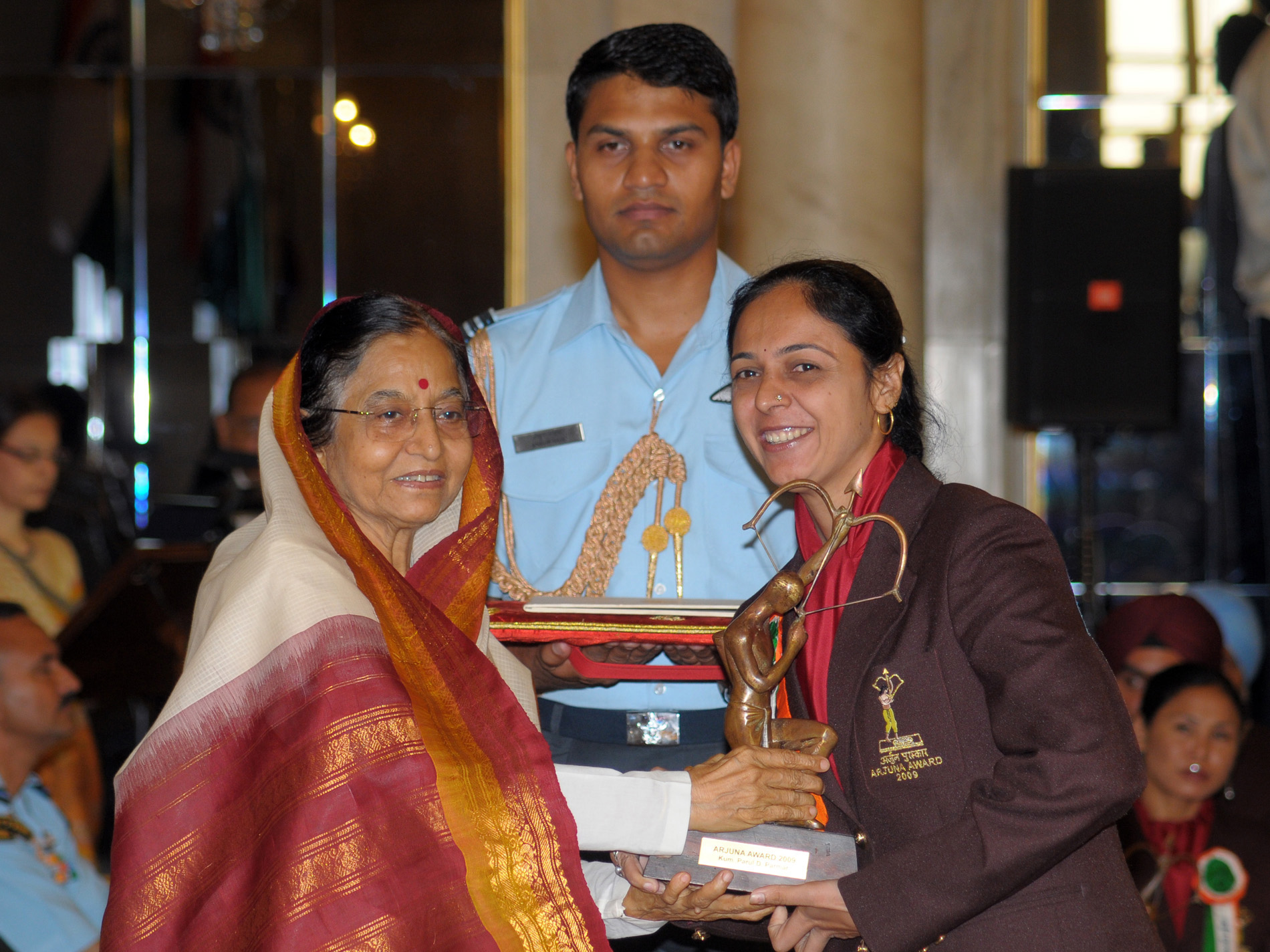
- Parmar presented with the Arjuna Award by the President of India Pratibha Patil in August 2009

Personal information
- Full name: Parul Dalsukhbhai Parmar
- Born: 20 March 1973 (age 53) Gandhinagar, Gujarat, India

Sport
- Sport: Badminton
- Coached by: Gaurav Khanna

Women's singles SL3 Women's doubles SL3–SU5 Mixed doubles SL3–SU5
- Highest ranking: 1 (WS 1 January 2019); 2 (WD with Palak Kohli 4 July 2022); 4 (XD with Raj Kumar 16 March 2022)
- Current ranking: 3 (WS); 3 (WD with Palak Kohli); 4 (XD with Raj Kumar) (8 November 2022)
Medal record
Women's para-badminton
Representing India
World Championships
Gold medal – first place	2007 Bangkok	Women's singles
Gold medal – first place	2007 Bangkok	Women's doubles
Gold medal – first place	2013 Dortmund	Women's singles
Gold medal – first place	2015 Stoke Mandeville	Mixed doubles
Gold medal – first place	2017 Ulsan	Women's singles
Gold medal – first place	2017 Ulsan	Women's doubles
Silver medal – second place	2015 Stoke Mandeville	Women's doubles
Silver medal – second place	2019 Basel	Women's singles
Bronze medal – third place	2013 Dortmund	Women's doubles
Bronze medal – third place	2013 Dortmund	Mixed doubles
Bronze medal – third place	2022 Tokyo	Women's singles
IWAS World Games
Gold medal – first place	2019 Sharjah	Mixed doubles
Silver medal – second place	2019 Sharjah	Women's singles
Asian Para Games
Gold medal – first place	2014 Incheon	Women's singles
Gold medal – first place	2018 Jakarta	Women's singles
Silver medal – second place	2014 Incheon	Mixed doubles
Bronze medal – third place	2010 Guangzhou	Women's singles
Asian Championships
Gold medal – first place	2016 Beijing	Women's singles
Bronze medal – third place	2016 Beijing	Women's doubles

Parul Dalsukhbhai Parmar (born 20 March 1973) is an Indian para-badminton player from Gujarat. She had been ranked world number one in para-badminton women's singles SL3.

== Early life ==
Parmar was born in Gandhinagar, Gujarat. She was diagnosed with Poliomyelitis when she was three years old and in the same year she fell from a swing while playing, resulting in a fractured collar bone and right leg. The injury took a long time to heal. Her father was a state-level badminton player and would go to a local badminton club to practice. She also started going to the club with her father and started developing interest in the game. She also began playing badminton with neighbor kids. A local coach, Surendra Parekh, noticed her talent in the sport and encouraged her to play more seriously.

== Career ==
She won the golds in women's singles and doubles at the 2017 BWF Para-Badminton World Championships. She defeated Wandee Kamtam of Thailand in singles' final. Along with Japan's Akiko Sugino, she defeated China's Cheng Hefang and Ma Huihui in doubles' final.

She has won golds in women's single SL3 at the 2014 and 2018 Asian Para Games. She also won gold in women's singles SL3 category, at the 2018 Thailand Para-Badminton International. She had previously won the silver in 2014 Asian Para Games and the bronze in 2010 Asian Para Games. She also won the gold in the mixed doubles in SL3-SU5 category with Raj Kumar at the 2015 BWF Para-Badminton World Championships.

She is a three time world champion and she won gold and silver medals in 2014, Asian Para Games in Incheon, South Korea. She played against Wandee Kamtam and Panyachaem Paramee, both hailing from Thailand, to win the medals. She also won two golds in women's singles and doubles. She paired with Japan's Akiko Sugino in doubles to defeat the Chinese duo of Cheng Hefang and Ma Huihui in the 2017 BWF Para-Badminton World Championships held in Ulsan, Korea in 2017.

She works as a coach with the Sports Authority of India and lives in Gandhinagar, Gujarat.

== Awards ==
Parmar was awarded the Arjuna Award in 2009 by the Government of India and Eklavya Award by the Government of Gujarat.

== Achievements ==
=== World Championships ===
Women's singles

Year	Venue	Opponent	Score	Result
2007	Bangkok, Thailand	(Thailand) Sudsaifon Yodpa	17–21, 21–13, 21–18	Gold
2013	Helmut-Körnig-Halle, Dortmund, Germany	(Norway) Helle Sofie Sagøy	17–21, 21–13, 21–18	Gold
2017	Dongchun Gymnasium, Ulsan, South Korea	(Thailand) Wandee Kamtam	21–8, 21–17	Gold
2019	St. Jakobshalle, Basel, Switzerland	(India) Manasi Girishchandra Joshi	12–21, 7–21	Silver
2022	Yoyogi National Gymnasium, Tokyo, Japan	(Turkey) Halime Yıldız	11–21, 6–21	Bronze

Women's doubles

Year	Venue	Partner	Opponent	Score	Result
2007	Bangkok, Thailand	(India) Charanjeet Kaur			Gold
2013 (Note: This tournament uses a round robin system.)	Helmut-Körnig-Halle, Dortmund, Germany	(Thailand) Wandee Kamtam	(Thailand) Nipada Saensupa (Thailand) Chanida Srinavakul	14–21, 17–21	Bronze
2013	Helmut-Körnig-Halle, Dortmund, Germany	(Thailand) Wandee Kamtam	(Thailand) Paramee Panyachaem (Denmark) Julie Thrane	21–15, 21–8	Bronze
2013	Helmut-Körnig-Halle, Dortmund, Germany	(Thailand) Wandee Kamtam	(Norway) Helle Sofie Sagøy (Germany) Katrin Seibert	17–21, 3–21	Bronze
2015 (Note: This tournament uses a round robin system.)	Stoke Mandeville Stadium, Stoke Mandeville, England	(Denmark) Julie Thrane	(France) Véronique Braud (France) Faustine Noël	21–9, 21–11	Silver
2015	Stoke Mandeville Stadium, Stoke Mandeville, England	(Denmark) Julie Thrane	(India) Siri Chandanna Chillari (India) Manasi Girishchandra Joshi	21–8, 21–6	Silver
2015	Stoke Mandeville Stadium, Stoke Mandeville, England	(Denmark) Julie Thrane	(Thailand) Wandee Kamtam (Japan) Mamiko Toyoda	21–18, 21–15	Silver
2015	Stoke Mandeville Stadium, Stoke Mandeville, England	(Denmark) Julie Thrane	(Norway) Helle Sofie Sagøy (Germany) Katrin Seibert	13–21, 16–21	Silver
2017	Dongchun Gymnasium, Ulsan, South Korea	(Japan) Akiko Sugino	(China) Cheng Hefang (China) Ma Huihui	21–16, 21–19	Gold

Mixed doubles

Year	Venue	Partner	Opponent	Score	Result
2013	Helmut-Körnig-Halle, Dortmund, Germany	(India) Manoj Sarkar	(Germany) Peter Schnitzler (Germany) Katrin Seibert	12–21, 21–19, 14–21	Bronze
2015	Stoke Mandeville Stadium, Stoke Mandeville, England	(India) Raj Kumar	(India) Rakesh Pandey (India) Manasi Girishchandra Joshi	21–10, 21–19	Gold

=== IWAS World Games ===
Women's singles

Year	Venue	Opponent	Score	Result
2019	American University of Sharjah, Sharjah, United Arab Emirates	(Thailand) Miss Samownkorn Photisuppaiboon	21–13, 19–21, 14–21	Silver

Mixed doubles

Year	Venue	Partner	Opponent	Score	Result
2019 (Note: This tournament uses a round robin system.)	American University of Sharjah, Sharjah, United Arab Emirates	(India) Pramod Bhagat	(India) Sharad Chandra Joshi (Bahrain) Zainab Ali Yusuf	21–7, 21–5	Gold
2019	American University of Sharjah, Sharjah, United Arab Emirates	(India) Pramod Bhagat	(Pakistan) Zeeshan Gohar (Iraq) Ramel Syawesh	21–8, 21–8	Gold
2019	American University of Sharjah, Sharjah, United Arab Emirates	(India) Pramod Bhagat	(United Arab Emirates) Sultan Al Halyan (United Arab Emirates) Meera Abouhatab	Walkover	Gold
2019	American University of Sharjah, Sharjah, United Arab Emirates	(India) Pramod Bhagat	(Thailand) Mongkhon Bunsun (Thailand) Miss Samownkorn Photisuppaiboon	21–4, 21–13	Gold

=== Asian Para Games ===
Women's singles

Year	Venue	Opponent	Score	Result
2010	Tianhe Gymnasium, Guangzhou, China	(Japan) Yuko Yamaguchi	21–17, 21–11	Bronze
2014 (Note: This tournament uses a round robin system.)	Gyeyang Gymnasium, Incheon, South Korea	(Hong Kong) Ng Lai Ling	21–4, 21–7	Gold
2014	Gyeyang Gymnasium, Incheon, South Korea	(Thailand) Paramee Panyachaem	21–4, 21–10	Gold
2014	Gyeyang Gymnasium, Incheon, South Korea	(Japan) Noriko Ito	21–3, 21–11	Gold
2014	Gyeyang Gymnasium, Incheon, South Korea	(Thailand) Wandee Kamtam	21–13, 21–17	Gold
2018	Istora Gelora Bung Karno, Jakarta, Indonesia	(Thailand) Wandee Kamtam	21–9, 21–5	Gold

Mixed doubles

Year	Venue	Partner	Opponent	Score	Result
2014	Gyeyang Gymnasium, Incheon, South Korea	(India) Raj Kumar	(Indonesia) Fredy Setiawan (Indonesia) Leani Ratri Oktila	14–21, 15–21	Silver

=== Asian Championships ===
Women's singles

Year	Venue	Opponent	Score	Result
2016 (Note: This tournament uses a round robin system.)	China Administration of Sport for Persons with Disabilities, Beijing, China	(Thailand) Wandee Kamtam	21–10, 21–5	Gold
2016	China Administration of Sport for Persons with Disabilities, Beijing, China	(Japan) Asami Yamada	21–2, 21–6	Gold
2016	China Administration of Sport for Persons with Disabilities, Beijing, China	(India) Manasi Girishchandra Joshi	21–8, 21–7	Gold

Women's doubles

Year	Venue	Partner	Opponent	Score	Result
2016 (Note: This tournament uses a round robin system.)	China Administration of Sport for Persons with Disabilities, Beijing, China	(Indonesia) Khalimatus Sadiyah	(India) Chiranjita Bharali (India) Manasi Girishchandra Joshi	21–9, 21–10	Bronze
2016	China Administration of Sport for Persons with Disabilities, Beijing, China	(Indonesia) Khalimatus Sadiyah	(China) Cheng Hefang (China) Ma Huihui	11–21, 4–21	Bronze
2016	China Administration of Sport for Persons with Disabilities, Beijing, China	(Indonesia) Khalimatus Sadiyah	(Japan) Akiko Sugino (Japan) Asami Yamada	15–21^{r}	Bronze

=== BWF Para Badminton World Circuit (2 titles, 3 runners-up) ===
The BWF Para Badminton World Circuit – Grade 2, Level 1, 2 and 3 tournaments has been sanctioned by the Badminton World Federation from 2022.

Men's singles

Year	Tournament	Level	Opponent	Score	Result
2022	Brazil Para Badminton International	Level 2	(India) Mandeep Kaur	13–21, 21–19, 16–21	(silver) Runner-up

Men's doubles

Year	Tournament	Level	Partner	Opponent	Score	Result
2022	Brazil Para Badminton International	Level 2	(India) Palak Kohli	(India) Mandeep Kaur (India) Manisha Ramdass	15–21, 15–21	(silver) Runner-up
2022	Bahrain Para Badminton International	Level 2	(India) Palak Kohli	(India) Mandeep Kaur (India) Manisha Ramdass	11–21, 11–21	(silver) Runner-up
2022	Peru Para Badminton International	Level 2	(India) Vaishali Nilesh Patel	(Peru) Kelly Ari (India) Mandeep Kaur	21–17, 21–19	(gold) Winner

Mixed doubles

Year	Tournament	Level	Partner	Opponent	Score	Result
2022	Spanish Para Badminton International	Level 1	(India) Raj Kumar	(India) Ruthick Ragupathi (India) Manasi Girishchandra Joshi	21–17, 21–18	(gold) Winner

=== International Tournaments (13 titles, 7 runners-up) ===
Women's singles

Year	Tournament	Opponent	Score	Result
2015	Spanish Para Badminton International	(Denmark) Julie Thrane	9–21, 13–21	(silver) Runner-up
2015 (Note: This tournament uses a round robin system.)	Indonesia Para Badminton International	(Indonesia) Sriyanti	21–11, 21–14	(gold) Winner
2015	Indonesia Para Badminton International	(Thailand) Paramee Panyachaem	21–8, 21–3	(gold) Winner
2015	Indonesia Para Badminton International	(Thailand) Wandee Kamtam	21–12, 21–13	(gold) Winner
2017	Thailand Para Badminton International	(Thailand) Wandee Kamtam	21–8, 15–21, 21–12	(gold) Winner
2017	Japan Para Badminton International	(Thailand) Wandee Kamtam	21–13, 21–13	(gold) Winner
2018	Thailand Para Badminton International	(Thailand) Wandee Kamtam	24–22, 17–21, 23–21	(gold) Winner
2019	Turkish Para Badminton International	(India) Manasi Girishchandra Joshi	21–8, 21–16	(gold) Winner
2019	Dubai Para Badminton International	(India) Manasi Girishchandra Joshi	21–12, 21–19	(gold) Winner
2019	Uganda Para Badminton International	(India) Manasi Girishchandra Joshi	21–14, 21–12	(gold) Winner
2019	Canada Para Badminton International	(India) Manasi Girishchandra Joshi	21–12, 21–7	(gold) Winner
2019	Irish Para Badminton International	(Turkey) Halime Yıldız	21–13, 21–2	(gold) Winner
2019	Thailand Para Badminton International	(Turkey) Halime Yıldız	21–12, 21–8	(gold) Winner
2019	Denmark Para Badminton International	(Turkey) Halime Yıldız	12–21, 21–17, 21–17	(gold) Winner
2020	Brazil Para Badminton International	(Turkey) Halime Yıldız	9–21, 14–21	(silver) Runner-up
2020	Peru Para Badminton International	(Turkey) Halime Yıldız	9–21, 21–10, 15–21	(silver) Runner-up
2021	Uganda Para Badminton International	(India) Manasi Girishchandra Joshi	7–21, 16–21	(silver) Runner-up

Women's doubles

Year	Tournament	Partner	Opponent	Score	Result
2019	Uganda Para Badminton International	(India) Palak Kohli	(Turkey) Zehra Bağlar (India) Manasi Girishchandra Joshi	21–15, 16–21, 21–15	(gold) Winner
2020	Peru Para Badminton International	(India) Palak Kohli	(Thailand) Nipada Saensupa (Thailand) Chanida Srinavakul	15–21, 13–21	(silver) Runner-up
2021	Uganda Para Badminton International	(India) Vaishali Nilesh Patel	(India) Palak Kohli (India) Mandeep Kaur	15–21, 14–21	(silver) Runner-up

Mixed doubles

Year	Tournament	Partner	Opponent	Score	Result
2015	Spanish Para Badminton International	(India) Manoj Sarkar	(Germany) Jan-Niklas Pott (Germany) Katrin Seibert	13–21, 21–17, 14–21	(silver) Runner-up
2019	Uganda Para Badminton International	(India) Raj Kumar	(France) Guillaume Gailly (Scotland) Mary Margaret Wilson	21–16, 21–10	(gold) Winner
