= Manasi Joshi =

Indian para-badminton player

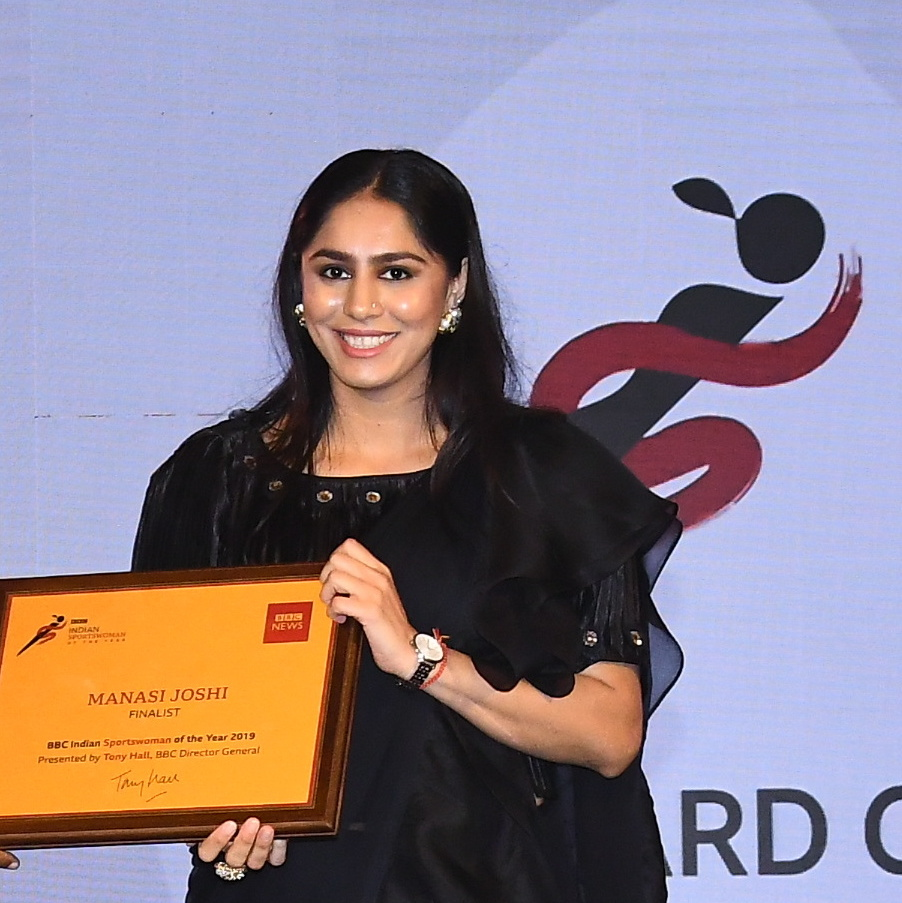

Personal information
- Born: 11 June 1989 (age 37) Rajkot, Gujarat, India
- Height: 171 cm (5 ft 7 in)
- Weight: 66 kg (146 lb)

Sport
- Country: India
- Sport: Badminton

Women's singles SL3 Women's doubles SL3–SU5 Mixed doubles SL3–SU5
- Highest ranking: 1 (WS 6 March 2022); 5 (WD with Shantiya Viswanathan 22 August 2022); 1 (XD with Ruthick Ragupathi 4 July 2022)
- Current ranking: 1 (WS); 5 (WD with Shantiya Viswanathan); 2 (XD with Ruthick Ragupathi) (8 November 2022)
Medal record
Women's para-badminton
Representing India
World Championships
Gold medal – first place	2019 Basel	Women's singles
Silver medal – second place	2015 Stoke Mandeville	Mixed doubles
Silver medal – second place	2024 Pattaya	Women's doubles
Bronze medal – third place	2017 Ulsan	Women's singles
Bronze medal – third place	2022 Tokyo	Women's singles
Bronze medal – third place	2022 Tokyo	Mixed doubles
Bronze medal – third place	2024 Pattaya	Women's singles
Bronze medal – third place	2026 Manama	Women's doubles
Asian Para Games
Silver medal – second place	2022 Hangzhou	Women's doubles
Bronze medal – third place	2018 Jakarta	Women's singles
Bronze medal – third place	2022 Hangzhou	Women's singles
Asian Championships
Bronze medal – third place	2016 Beijing	Women's singles

Manasi Joshi (born 11 June 1989) is an Indian para-badminton player. She is a former world champion in para badminton women's singles SL3 category. On 8 March 2022, she was ranked world No.1 in women's singles SL3 category.

== Early life and background ==
Manasi was born in Rajkot, Gujarat and she was raised in Anushaktinagar, Mumbai. She graduated in Electronics Engineering from K. J. Somaiya College of Engineering, University of Mumbai, in 2010. A sports lover, Manasi played football and badminton in her school and college life. Joshi started playing badminton when she was six along with her father, a retired scientist from Bhabha Atomic Research Centre. Over the years she represented her school, college and corporate at various tournaments. After finishing graduation in 2010, she worked as a software engineer until December 2011.

== Accident ==
In December 2011, she met with a road accident while riding her motorbike to work, and her leg had to be amputated. After 45 days of hospitalisation, Manasi got discharged from MGM hospital Vashi, Navi Mumbai.

== Career ==
Joshi started her sporting journey in 2015 and in 2020, she was ranked world No.2 in women's singles SL3 category. She was selected for Asian Para-Games 2014 and played her first international tournament in Spain. In 2018, she asked Pullela Gopichand to coach her, and enrolled in his badminton academy at Hyderabad. In September 2015, Joshi won a silver medal in mixed doubles at the Para-Badminton World Championship held in Stoke Mandeville, England. In October 2018, she won a bronze medal for India at the Asian Para Games 2018, held in Jakarta, Indonesia. In August 2019, at the Para-Badminton World Championship 2019 in Basel, Switzerland, she won a gold medal. She won a silver medal in the doubles along with Thulasimathi Murugesan and a bronze in the singles SL3 in the 2022 Asian Para Games at Gangzhou, China.

== Awards and recognition ==
Manasi was listed as the Next Generation Leader 2020 by TIME Magazine in October 2020 and she appeared on their Asia cover, making her the first para-athlete in the world and the first Indian athlete to be featured on the magazine's cover, for being an advocate of rights for people with disabilities.

On the occasion of the International Day of Girl Child (11 October 2020), Barbie celebrated Manasi and her achievements by modelling a one-of-a-kind Barbie doll to her likeness to inspire young girls. She has also been recognized by BBC as one of the 100 most inspirational & powerful women across the world in 2020 and was nominated for the BBC Indian Sportswoman of the Year Award of 2020 alongside P. V. Sindhu, Mary Kom, Vinesh Phogat and Dutee Chand.

- 2017 - Maharashtra Rajya Eklavya Khel Krida Puraskar (Highest State honour)
- 2019 - National award for Best Sportsperson with Disability (female)
- 2019 - Differently abled athlete of the year award at ESPN India Awards
- 2019 - Times of India Sports award for Best para-athlete of the year
- 2019 - Aces 2020 Sportswoman of the Year (Para-sports) Hindu Newspaper (Nominee)
- 2019 – BBC Indian Sportswoman of the Year
- 2020 – TIME Next Generation Leader
- 2020 - BBC 100 Women
- 2020 – Forbes India, Self-made Women of 2020

== Achievements ==
=== World Championships ===
Women's singles

Year	Venue	Opponent	Score	Result
2017	St. Jakobshalle, Basel, Switzerland	(India) Parul Parmar	12–21, 7–21	Bronze
2019	Dongchun Gymnasium, Ulsan, South Korea	(India) Parul Parmar	21–12, 21–7	Gold
2022	Yoyogi National Gymnasium, Tokyo, Japan	(Ukraine) Oksana Kozyna	18–21, 18–21	Bronze
2024	Pattaya Exhibition and Convention Hall, Pattaya, Thailand	(Indonesia) Qonitah Ikhtiar Syakuroh	12–21, 12–21	Bronze

Women’s doubles

Year	Venue	Partner	Opponent	Score	Result
2024	Pattaya Exhibition and Convention Hall, Pattaya, Thailand	(India) Thulasimathi Murugesan	(Indonesia) Leani Ratri Oktila (Indonesia) Khalimatus Sadiyah	20–22, 17–21	Silver

Mixed doubles

Year	Venue	Partner	Opponent	Score	Result
2015	Stoke Mandeville Stadium, Stoke Mandeville, England	(India) Rakesh Pandey	(India) Raj Kumar (India) Parul Parmar	10–21, 19–21	Silver
2022	Yoyogi National Gymnasium, Tokyo, Japan	(India) Ruthick Ragupathi	(Indonesia) Fredy Setiawan (Indonesia) Khalimatus Sadiyah	10–21, 8–21	Bronze

=== Asian Para Games ===
Women's singles

Year	Venue	Opponent	Score	Result
2018	Istora Gelora Bung Karno, Jakarta, Indonesia	(India) Parul Parmar	13–21, 12–21	Bronze

=== Asian Championships ===
Women's singles

Year	Venue	Opponent	Score	Result
2016	China Administration of Sport for Persons with Disabilities, Beijing, China	(Japan) Asami Yamada	21–11, 21–7	Bronze
2016	China Administration of Sport for Persons with Disabilities, Beijing, China	(Thailand) Wandee Kamtam	14–21, 12–21	Bronze
2016	China Administration of Sport for Persons with Disabilities, Beijing, China	(India) Parul Parmar	8–21, 7–21	Bronze

=== BWF Para Badminton World Circuit (5 titles, 6 runners-up) ===
The BWF Para Badminton World Circuit – Grade 2, Level 1, 2 and 3 tournaments has been sanctioned by the Badminton World Federation from 2022.

Women's singles

Year	Tournament	Level	Opponent	Score	Result
2022	Spanish Para Badminton International II	Level 2	(India) Mandeep Kaur	21–10, 21–13	(gold) Winner
2022 (Note: This tournament uses a round robin system.)	Spanish Para Badminton International	Level 1	(France) Coraline Bergeron	Walkover	(gold) Winner
2022	Spanish Para Badminton International	Level 1	(India) Mandeep Kaur	21–13, 21–16	(gold) Winner
2022	Spanish Para Badminton International	Level 1	(Japan) Noriko Ito	21–9, 21–7	(gold) Winner
2022	Spanish Para Badminton International	Level 1	(India) Parul Parmar	21–12, 21–17	(gold) Winner
2022	Dubai Para Badminton International	Level 2	(India) Mandeep Kaur	16–21, 24–22, 21–14	(gold) Winner
2022 (Note: This tournament uses a round robin system.)	Canada Para Badminton International	Level 1	(India) Parul Parmar	21–14, 21–19	(gold) Winner
2022	Canada Para Badminton International	Level 1	(France) Coraline Bergeron	21–14, 21–17	(gold) Winner
2022	Canada Para Badminton International	Level 1	(Ukraine) Oksana Kozyna	21–18, 15–21, 22–20	(gold) Winner
2022	Canada Para Badminton International	Level 1	(Japan) Noriko Ito	21–14, 21–10	(gold) Winner
2022	Thailand Para Badminton International	Level 1	(India) Mandeep Kaur	22–20, 19–21, 14–21	(silver) Runner-up

Women's doubles

Year	Tournament	Level	Partner	Opponent	Score	Result
2022	Spanish Para Badminton International II	Level 2	(India) Shanthiya Viswanathan	(India) Mandeep Kaur (India) Manisha Ramdass	21–14, 21–23, 12–21	(silver) Runner-up
2022	Thailand Para Badminton International	Level 1	(India) Shanthiya Viswanathan	(Thailand) Nipada Saensupa (Thailand) Chanida Srinavakul	20–22, 19–21	(silver) Runner-up
2023	Brazil Para-Badminton International	Level 2	(India) Thulasimathi Murugesan	(India) Mandeep Kaur (India) Manisha Ramadass	21–11, 21–10	(gold) Winner

Mixed doubles

Year	Tournament	Level	Partner	Opponent	Score	Result
2022	Spanish Para Badminton International II	Level 2	(India) Ruthick Ragupathi	(India) Pramod Bhagat (India) Palak Kohli	21–14, 11–21, 14–21	(silver) Runner-up
2022	Spanish Para Badminton International	Level 1	(India) Ruthick Ragupathi	(India) Raj Kumar (India) Parul Parmar	17–21, 18–21	(silver) Runner-up
2022	Thailand Para Badminton International	Level 1	(India) Ruthick Ragupathi	(France) Lucas Mazur (France) Faustine Noël	21–17, 15–21, 7–21	(silver) Runner-up

=== International tournaments (7 titles, 8 runners-up) ===
Women's singles

Year	Tournament	Opponent	Score	Result
2016 (Note: This tournament uses a round robin system.)	Irish Para Badminton International	(Wales) Nicola Tustain	21–11, 21–9	(silver) Runner-up
2016	Irish Para Badminton International	(Japan) Asami Yamada	21–11, 21–9	(silver) Runner-up
2016	Irish Para Badminton International	(Poland) Katarzyna Ziębik	21–12, 11–21, 21–10	(silver) Runner-up
2018 (Note: This tournament uses a round robin system.)	Spanish Para Badminton International	(Thailand) Darunee Henpraiwan	12–21, 21–17, 21–19	(gold) Winner
2018	Spanish Para Badminton International	(Japan) Asami Yamada	21–15, 21–17	(gold) Winner
2018	Spanish Para Badminton International	(Poland) Katarzyna Ziębik	23–21, 21–18	(gold) Winner
2018	Japan Para Badminton International	(Japan) Noriko Ito	16–21, 21–18, 21–3	(gold) Winner
2018	Australia Para Badminton International	(Japan) Noriko Ito	21–13, 21–12	(gold) Winner
2019	Turkish Para Badminton International	(India) Parul Parmar	8–21, 16–21	(silver) Runner-up
2019	Dubai Para Badminton International	(India) Parul Parmar	12–21, 19–21	(silver) Runner-up
2019	Uganda Para Badminton International	(India) Parul Parmar	14–21, 12–21	(silver) Runner-up
2019	Canada Para Badminton International	(India) Parul Parmar	12–21, 7–21	(silver) Runner-up
2021	Dubai Para Badminton International	(Ukraine) Oksana Kozyna	10–21, 17–21	(silver) Runner-up
2021	Uganda Para Badminton International	(India) Parul Parmar	21–7, 21–16	(gold) Winner

Women's doubles

Year	Tournament	Partner	Opponent	Score	Result
2017	Japan Para Badminton International	(China) Yang Qiuxia	(Norway) Helle Sofie Sagøy (Germany) Katrin Seibert	23–21, 21–15	(gold) Winner
2018	Spanish Para Badminton International	(Japan) Mamiko Toyoda	(Norway) Helle Sofie Sagøy (Germany) Katrin Seibert	19–21, 12–21	(silver) Runner-up
2018	Dubai Para Badminton International	(Turkey) Zehra Bağlar	(France) Faustine Noël (Indonesia) Leani Ratri Oktila	17–21, 7–21	(silver) Runner-up
2019	Uganda Para Badminton International	(Turkey) Zehra Bağlar	(India) Palak Kohli (India) Parul Parmar	15–21, 21–16, 15–21	(gold) Winner

Mixed doubles

Year	Tournament	Partner	Opponent	Score	Result
2021	Uganda Para Badminton International	(India) Ruthick Ragupathi	(India) Pramod Bhagat (India) Palak Kohli	21–19, 21–16	(gold) Winner
