= Caitlin Dransfield =

Australian para-badminton player

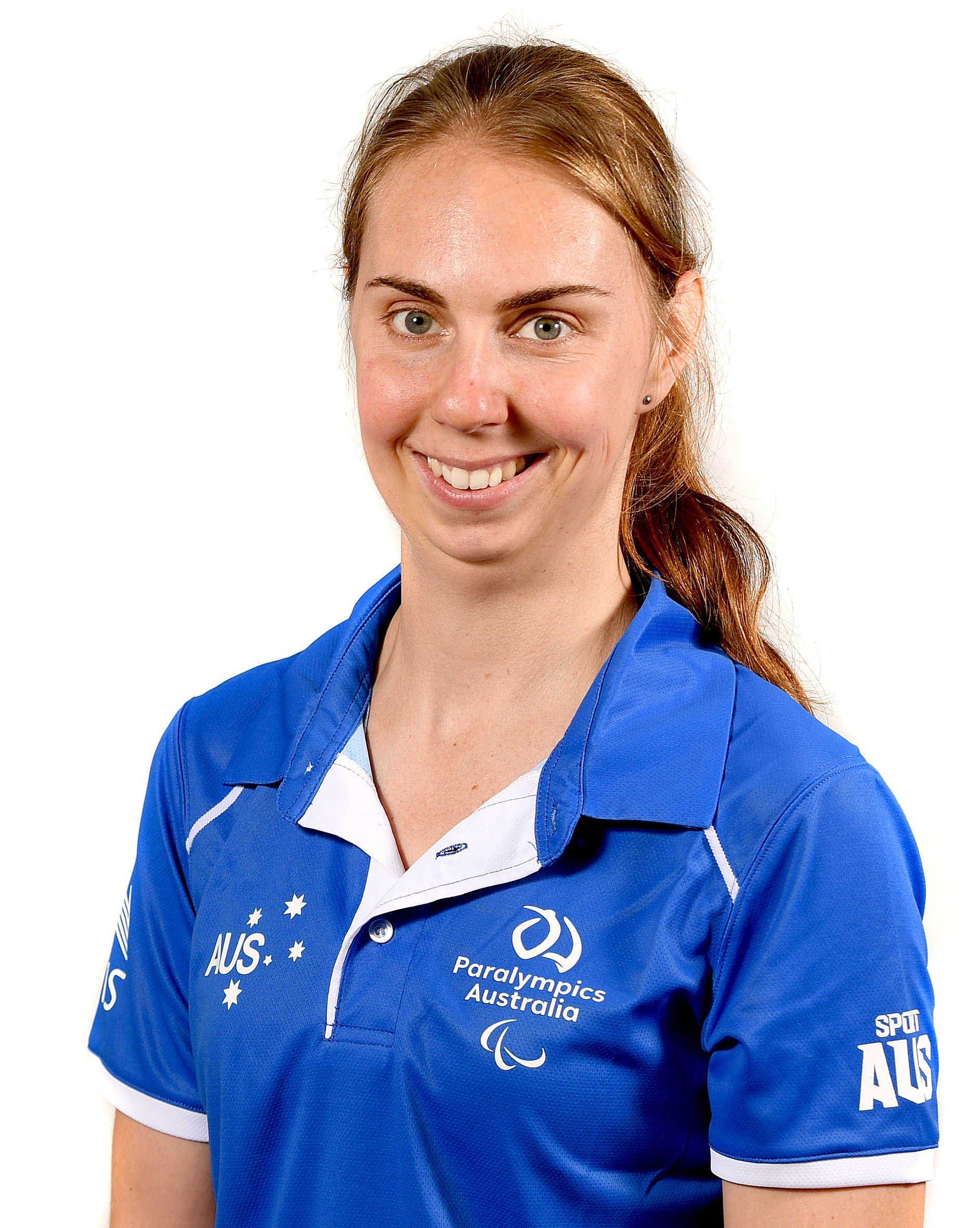
- Caitlin Dransfield in 2019

Personal information
- Born: 13 January 1991 (age 35) Perth, Australia
- Height: 171 cm (5 ft 7 in)
- Weight: 61 kg (134 lb)

Sport
- Country: Australia
- Sport: Badminton
- Coached by: Mark Cunningham

Women's singles SL4 Women's doubles SL3–SU5 Mixed doubles SL3–SU5
- Highest ranking: 8 (WS 8 November 2022); 14 (WD with Doung Kim Chou 19 September 2022); 21 (XD with Corrie Keith Robinson 1 January 2019)
- Current ranking: 8 (WS); 18 (WD with Doung Kim Chou); 33 (XD with Kenneth Adlawan) (15 November 2022)
- BWF profile
Medal record
Women's para-badminton
Representing Australia
Oceania Championships
Gold medal – first place	2018 Geelong	Women's singles
Gold medal – first place	2018 Geelong	Mixed doubles
Gold medal – first place	2022 Melbourne	Women's singles
Gold medal – first place	2022 Melbourne	Doubles
Silver medal – second place	2022 Melbourne	Mixed doubles

Caitlin Dransfield (born 13 January 1991) is an Australian para-badminton player. She competed at the 2020 Summer Paralympics where badminton made its Paralympics debut.

== Personal ==
Dransfield was born on 13 January 1991 with right-sided hemiplegia cerebral palsy. She attended Mount Lawley Senior High School. In 2021, she is employed at Rise and studying a Bachelor of Disability and Community Inclusion at Flinders University.

== Badminton ==
Her early sporting life was predominantly in tennis. In 2016, she took up para badminton and is a member of the Duncraig Badminton Club in Perth, Western Australia. She is classified as SL4. In 2018, she won Women's Singles (SL3-SL4) and Mixed Doubles at the 2018 Oceania Championships.

At the 2020 Summer Paralympics, competing in the Women's singles SL4, Dransfield lost to Helle Sofie Sagoy of Norway 2–0 in the Group Stage. She then lost to Chanida Srinavakul from Thailand 2-0 but then managed to take a set off Olivia Meier of Canada but still lost 2–1. She was therefore eliminated and did not compete in the quarterfinals.

She is coached by Mark Cunningham in Perth.

== Achievements ==
=== Oceania Championships ===
Women's singles

Year	Venue	Opponent	Score	Result
2018 (Note: This tournament uses a round robin system.)	Leisuretime Sports Precinct, Geelong, Australia	(Australia) Celine Aurelie Vinot	21–5, 21–1	Gold
2018	Leisuretime Sports Precinct, Geelong, Australia	(Australia) Anu Francis	21–6, 21–2	Gold
2018	Leisuretime Sports Precinct, Geelong, Australia	(Australia) Zashka Gunson	21–2, 21–3	Gold
2022	Melbourne Sports and Aquatic Centre, Melbourne, Australia	(New Zealand) Carrie Joanne Wilson	21–9, 21–12	Gold

D2ubles

Year	Venue	Partner	Opponent	Score	Result
2022	Melbourne Sports and Aquatic Centre, Melbourne, Australia	(Australia) Doung Kim Chou	(Australia) Kenneth Adlawan (Australia) Phonexay Kinnavong	25–27, 21–18, 22–20	Gold

Mixed doubles

Year	Venue	Partner	Opponent	Score	Result
2018 (Note: This tournament uses a round robin system.)	Leisuretime Sports Precinct, Geelong, Australia	(New Zealand) Corrie Keith Robinson	(Australia) Hayden Bognar (Australia) Celine Aurelie Vinot	21–3, 21–6	Gold
2018	Leisuretime Sports Precinct, Geelong, Australia	(New Zealand) Corrie Keith Robinson	(Australia) Phonexay Kinnavong (Australia) Anu Francis	21–9, 21–11	Gold
2018	Leisuretime Sports Precinct, Geelong, Australia	(New Zealand) Corrie Keith Robinson	(Australia) Adam Torey-Toth (Australia) Zashka Gunson	21–5, 21–5	Gold
2022	Melbourne Sports and Aquatic Centre, Melbourne, Australia	(Australia) Kenneth Adlawan	(New Zealand) Oliver Kiran Linton (New Zealand) Carrie Joanne Wilson	21–8, 13–21, 23–25	Silver
