= Dongchun Gymnasium =

Indoor sporting arena in Ulsan, South Korea

Dongchun Gymnasium 동천체육관
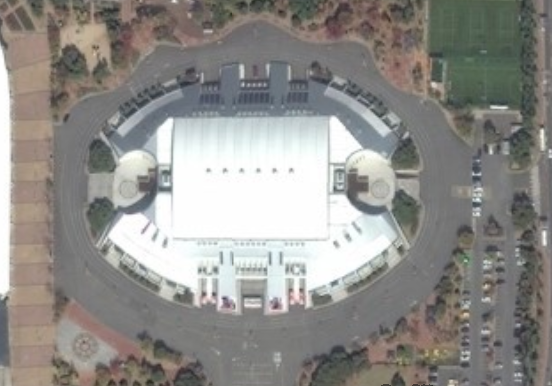
- Interactive map of Dongchun Gymnasium 동천체육관
- Full name: Ulsan Dongchun Gymnasium
- Location: Ulsan, South Korea
- Coordinates: 35.5624385°N 129.3503666°E
- Owner: Ulsan city
- Operator: Ulsan Metropolitan Facility Management Corporation
- Capacity: 5,831
- Field size: 36 × 54 m
- Acreage: 22,671 m^{2}

Construction
- Groundbreaking: 1 August 1991
- Built: 1 August 1991–26 October 2000
- Opened: January 2001; 25 years ago
- Cost: 48,4 billion won

Tenants
- Ulsan Mobis Phoebus (Korean Basketball League)

Website
- http://www.uimc.or.kr

Korean name
- Hangul: 동천체육관
- RR: Dongcheon cheyukgwan
- MR: Tongch'ŏn ch'eyukkwan

Dongchun Gymnasium is a multi-purpose indoor sporting arena located in Jung-gu, Ulsan, South Korea. The capacity of the arena is 5,831. It was opened in January 2001 after several setbacks and problems with its construction.
