= 2026 BWF Para-Badminton World Championships – Women's Singles SL3 =

Women's Singles SL3 at 2026 BWF Para-Badminton World Championships
Tournament details
- Dates: 8–13 February 2026
- Competitors: 30
- Venue: Isa Sports City, Manama

The women's singles SL3 tournament at the 2026 BWF Para-Badminton World Championships took place from 8 to 13 February 2026 at Isa Sports City in Manama. A total of 30 players competed at the tournament.

== Classification ==
- SL3
  Players have impairment in one or both lower limbs and poor walking/running balance

== Format ==
The 30 players were split into 8 groups of three to four players. They played a round-robin tournament with the top 2 players advancing to the knockout stage. Each match was played in a best-of-3.

== Seeds ==
These were the seeds for this event:

1. (Indonesia) Qonitah Ikhtiar Syakuroh (quarter-finals)
2. (Nigeria) Mariam Eniola Bolaji (final)

== Group stage ==
All times are local (UTC+3).

=== Group A ===
Pos	Team	Pld	W	L	GF	GA	GD	PF	PA	PD	Pts	Qualification
1	Qonitah Ikhtiar Syakuroh (INA)	2	2	0	4	0	+4	84	29	+55	2	Knockout stage
2	Liu Yuemei (CHN)	2	1	1	2	3	−1	63	101	−38	1	Knockout stage
3	Coraline Bergeron (FRA)	2	0	2	1	4	−3	77	94	−17	0	

Source: BWFBadminton.com

Date	Time	Player 1	Score	Player 2	Set 1	Set 2	Set 3
8 February	09:30	Coraline Bergeron (France)	1–2	(China) Liu Yuemei	21–17	12–21	19–21
9 February	10:00	Qonitah Ikhtiar Syakuroh (Indonesia)	2–0	(France) Coraline Bergeron	21–5	21–6	
10 February	13:30	Qonitah Ikhtiar Syakuroh (Indonesia)	2–0	(China) Liu Yuemei	21–11	21–7	

=== Group B ===
Pos	Team	Pld	W	L	GF	GA	GD	PF	PA	PD	Pts	Qualification
1	Mariam Eniola Bolaji (NGR)	2	2	0	4	0	+4	84	35	+49	2	Knockout stage
2	Caitlin Dransfield (AUS)	2	1	1	2	2	0	67	54	+13	1	Knockout stage
3	Adriane Spinetti Avila (BRA)	2	0	2	0	4	−4	22	84	−62	0	

Source: BWFBadminton.com

Date	Time	Player 1	Score	Player 2	Set 1	Set 2	Set 3
8 February	14:30	Caitlin Dransfield (Australia)	2–0	(Brazil) Adriane Spinetti Avila	21–4	21–8	
9 February	13:30	Mariam Eniola Bolaji (Nigeria)	2–0	(Australia) Caitlin Dransfield	21–13	21–12	
10 February	14:00	Mariam Eniola Bolaji (Nigeria)	2–0	(Brazil) Adriane Spinetti Avila	21–3	21–7	

=== Group C ===
Pos	Team	Pld	W	L	GF	GA	GD	PF	PA	PD	Pts	Qualification
1	Mandeep Kaur (IND)	3	3	0	6	0	+6	126	32	+94	3	Knockout stage
2	Roni Kesten (ISR)	3	2	1	4	2	+2	103	52	+51	2	Knockout stage
3	Elizabeth Nabwire Ouma (KEN)	3	1	2	2	5	−3	68	127	−59	1	
4	Rossana Guadalupe Guzmán Vilchis (MEX)	3	0	3	1	6	−5	59	145	−86	0	

Source: BWFBadminton.com

Date	Time	Player 1	Score	Player 2	Set 1	Set 2	Set 3
8 February	10:00	Mandeep Kaur (India)	2–0	(Israel) Roni Kesten	21–9	21–10	
8 February	14:30	Elizabeth Nabwire Ouma (Kenya)	2–1	(Mexico) Rossana Guadalupe Guzmán Vilchis	19–21	21–12	21–10
9 February	10:00	Mandeep Kaur (India)	2–0	(Kenya) Elizabeth Nabwire Ouma	21–1	21–2	
9 February	13:30	Rossana Guadalupe Guzmán Vilchis (Mexico)	0–2	(Israel) Roni Kesten	3–21	3–21	
10 February	14:00	Mandeep Kaur (India)	2–0	(Mexico) Rossana Guadalupe Guzmán Vilchis	21–6	21–4	
10 February	14:30	Elizabeth Nabwire Ouma (Kenya)	0–2	(Israel) Roni Kesten	3–21	1–21	

=== Group D ===
Pos	Team	Pld	W	L	GF	GA	GD	PF	PA	PD	Pts	Qualification
1	Gu Feifei (CHN)	3	3	0	6	0	+6	126	50	+76	3	Knockout stage
2	Milena Surreau (FRA)	3	2	1	4	3	+1	127	109	+18	2	Knockout stage
3	Oksana Kozyna (UKR)	3	1	2	3	4	−1	110	115	−5	1	
4	Shahinda Ebrahim Mohamed (EGY)	3	0	3	0	6	−6	37	126	−89	0	

Source: BWFBadminton.com

Date	Time	Player 1	Score	Player 2	Set 1	Set 2	Set 3
8 February	10:00	Oksana Kozyna (Ukraine)	2–0	(Egypt) Shahinda Ebrahim Mohamed	21–8	21–4	
8 February	10:30	Gu Feifei (China)	2–0	(France) Milena Surreau	21–13	21–11	
9 February	10:30	Oksana Kozyna (Ukraine)	0–2	(China) Gu Feifei	6–21	9–21	
9 February	14:00	Milena Surreau (France)	2–0	(Egypt) Shahinda Ebrahim Mohamed	21–4	21–10	
10 February	09:30	Oksana Kozyna (Ukraine)	2–1	(France) Milena Surreau	21–19	15–21	17–21
10 February	09:30	Gu Feifei (China)	2–0	(Egypt) Shahinda Ebrahim Mohamed	21–7	21–4	

=== Group E ===
Pos	Team	Pld	W	L	GF	GA	GD	PF	PA	PD	Pts	Qualification
1	Shino Kawai (JPN)	3	3	0	6	0	+6	126	29	+97	3	Knockout stage
2	Xiao Zuxian (CHN)	3	2	1	4	2	+2	106	76	+30	2	Knockout stage
3	Neeraj (IND)	3	1	2	2	4	−2	70	96	−26	1	
4	Diana Lizeth Leon Sierra (COL)	3	0	3	0	6	−6	25	126	−101	0	

Source: BWFBadminton.com

Date	Time	Player 1	Score	Player 2	Set 1	Set 2	Set 3
8 February	10:30	Xiao Zuxian (China)	2–0	(Colombia) Diana Lizeth Leon Sierra	21–5	21–6	
8 February	15:00	Neeraj (India)	0–2	(Japan) Shino Kawai	2–21	3–21	
9 February	14:00	Neeraj (India)	0–2	(China) Xiao Zuxian	11–21	12–21	
9 February	14:30	Diana Lizeth Leon Sierra (Colombia)	0–2	(Japan) Shino Kawai	1–21	1–21	
10 February	10:00	Neeraj (India)	2–0	(Colombia) Diana Lizeth Leon Sierra	21–6	21–6	
10 February	10:00	Xiao Zuxian (China)	0–2	(Japan) Shino Kawai	8–21	14–21	

=== Group F ===
Pos	Team	Pld	W	L	GF	GA	GD	PF	PA	PD	Pts	Qualification
1	Halime Yıldız (TUR)	3	3	0	6	0	+6	128	52	+76	3	Knockout stage
2	Maria Guadalupe Rojas Perez (MEX)	3	2	1	4	3	+1	137	112	+25	2	Knockout stage
3	Emona Ivanova (BUL)	3	1	2	3	5	−2	116	150	−34	1	
4	Flor Maria del Milagro Arequipeño Vasquez (PER)	3	0	3	1	6	−5	77	144	−67	0	

Source: BWFBadminton.com

Date	Time	Player 1	Score	Player 2	Set 1	Set 2	Set 3
8 February	11:00	Halime Yıldız (Turkey)	2–0	(Mexico) Maria Guadalupe Rojas Perez	23–21	21–15	
8 February	15:00	Emona Ivanova (Bulgaria)	2–1	(Peru) Flor Maria del Milagro Arequipeño Vasquez	18–21	21–13	21–15
9 February	14:30	Halime Yıldız (Turkey)	2–0	(Bulgaria) Emona Ivanova	21–3	21–7	
9 February	15:00	Flor Maria del Milagro Arequipeño Vasquez (Peru)	0–2	(Mexico) Maria Guadalupe Rojas Perez	15–21	7–21	
10 February	10:30	Emona Ivanova (Bulgaria)	1–2	(Mexico) Maria Guadalupe Rojas Perez	13–21	21–17	12–21
10 February	14:30	Halime Yıldız (Turkey)	2–0	(Peru) Flor Maria del Milagro Arequipeño Vasquez	21–4	21–2	

=== Group G ===
Pos	Team	Pld	W	L	GF	GA	GD	PF	PA	PD	Pts	Qualification
1	Siti Maisarah binti Mat Lawani (MAS)	3	3	0	6	1	+5	142	84	+58	3	Knockout stage
2	Manasi Girishchandra Joshi (IND)	3	2	1	5	2	+3	137	87	+50	2	Knockout stage
3	Darunee Henpraiwan (THA)	3	1	2	2	4	−2	62	119	−57	1	
4	Hillevi Salomonsson (SWE)	3	0	3	0	6	−6	76	127	−51	0	

Source: BWFBadminton.com

Date	Time	Player 1	Score	Player 2	Set 1	Set 2	Set 3
8 February	11:00	Manasi Girishchandra Joshi (India)	2–0	(Sweden) Hillevi Salomonsson	21–12	21–9	
8 February	11:30	Darunee Henpraiwan (Thailand)	0–2	(Malaysia) Siti Maisarah binti Mat Lawani	1–21	10–21	
9 February	10:30	Manasi Girishchandra Joshi (India)	2–0	(Thailand) Darunee Henpraiwan	21–3	21–5	
9 February	15:00	Siti Maisarah binti Mat Lawani (Malaysia)	2–0	(Sweden) Hillevi Salomonsson	21–7	21–13	
10 February	10:30	Darunee Henpraiwan (Thailand)	2–0	(Sweden) Hillevi Salomonsson	21–15	22–20	
10 February	15:00	Manasi Girishchandra Joshi (India)	1–2	(Malaysia) Siti Maisarah binti Mat Lawani	21–16	15–21	17–21

=== Group H ===
Pos	Team	Pld	W	L	GF	GA	GD	PF	PA	PD	Pts	Qualification
1	Yuan Gaoying (CHN)	3	3	0	6	2	+4	161	111	+50	3	Knockout stage
2	Céline Vinot (AUS)	3	2	1	5	2	+3	134	116	+18	2	Knockout stage
3	Kauana Michelson Beckenkamp (BRA)	3	1	2	3	4	−1	126	135	−9	1	
4	Sanjana Kumari (IND)	3	0	3	0	6	−6	67	126	−59	0	

Source: BWFBadminton.com

Date	Time	Player 1	Score	Player 2	Set 1	Set 2	Set 3
8 February	11:30	Kauana Michelson Beckenkamp (Brazil)	1–2	(China) Yuan Gaoying	21–16	13–21	13–21
8 February	15:30	Céline Vinot (Australia)	2–0	(India) Sanjana Kumari	21–8	21–10	
9 February	11:00	Céline Vinot (Australia)	2–0	(Brazil) Kauana Michelson Beckenkamp	21–14	25–23	
9 February	15:00	Yuan Gaoying (China)	2–0	(India) Sanjana Kumari	21–7	21–11	
10 February	11:00	Kauana Michelson Beckenkamp (Brazil)	2–0	(India) Sanjana Kumari	21–12	21–19	
10 February	15:00	Céline Vinot (Australia)	1–2	(China) Yuan Gaoying	21–19	14–21	11–21

== Knockout stage ==
Round of 16
A1	(Indonesia) Qonitah Ikhtiar Syakuroh	21	21
G2	(India) Manasi Girishchandra Joshi	13	9
E1	(Japan) Shino Kawai	21	21
C2	(Israel) Roni Kesten	1	1
D1	(China) Gu Feifei	21	21
H2	(Australia) Céline Vinot	19	11
G1	(Malaysia) Siti Maisarah binti Mat Lawani	9	18
E2	(China) Xiao Zuxian	21	21
F2	(Mexico) Maria Guadalupe Rojas Perez	9	14
H1	(China) Yuan Gaoying	21	21
B2	(Australia) Caitlin Dransfield	21	21
C1	(India) Mandeep Kaur	15	11
A2	(China) Liu Yuemei	15	6
F1	(Turkey) Halime Yıldız	21	21
D2	(France) Milena Surreau	13	12
B1	(Nigeria) Mariam Eniola Bolaji	21	21

Quarter-finals
A1	(Indonesia) Qonitah Ikhtiar Syakuroh	6	14
E1	(Japan) Shino Kawai	21	21
D1	(China) Gu Feifei	17	13
E2	(China) Xiao Zuxian	21	21
H1	(China) Yuan Gaoying	17	21	21
B2	(Australia) Caitlin Dransfield	21	17	15
F1	(Turkey) Halime Yıldız	6	9
B1	(Nigeria) Mariam Eniola Bolaji	21	21

Semi-finals
E1	(Japan) Shino Kawai	20	21	21
E2	(China) Xiao Zuxian	22	15	14
H1	(China) Yuan Gaoying	12	16
B1	(Nigeria) Mariam Eniola Bolaji	21	21

Final
E1	(Japan) Shino Kawai	21	21
B1	(Nigeria) Mariam Eniola Bolaji	14	17
