= 2026 BWF Para-Badminton World Championships – Women's Doubles WH1–WH2 =

Women's Doubles WH1–WH2 at 2026 BWF Para-Badminton World Championships
Tournament details
- Dates: 8–13 February 2026
- Competitors: 28
- Venue: Isa Sports City, Manama

The women's doubles WH1–WH2 tournament at the 2026 BWF Para-Badminton World Championships took place from 8 to 13 February 2026 at Isa Sports City in Manama. A total of 14 pairs competed at the tournament.

== Classification ==
- WH1
  Players in this class are those who have impairment in both lower limbs and trunk function and require wheelchair to play
- WH2
  Players have impairment in one or both lower limbs and minimal or no impairment of the trunk and also require wheelchair

Each pair must consists of one WH1 player and one WH1 or WH2 player.

== Format ==
The 14 pairs were split into 4 groups of three to four pairs. They played a round-robin tournament with the top 2 pairs advancing to the knockout stage. Each match was played in a best-of-3.

== Seeds ==
These were the seeds for this event:

1. (Switzerland) Cynthia Mathez / (Switzerland) Ilaria Olgiati (semi-finals)
2. (Brazil) Maria Gilda dos Santos Domingues Antunes / (Brazil) Auricélia Nunes Evangelista (quarter-finals)

== Group stage ==
All times are local (UTC+3).

=== Group A ===
Pos	Team	Pld	W	L	GF	GA	GD	PF	PA	PD	Pts	Qualification
1	Cynthia Mathez (SUI) Ilaria Olgiati (SUI)	2	2	0	4	0	+4	84	33	+51	2	Knockout stage
2	Li Jiaqi (CHN) Xu Tingting (CHN)	2	1	1	2	2	0	65	58	+7	1	Knockout stage
3	Natalia Grzyb (POL) Anna Wolny (POL)	2	0	2	0	4	−4	26	84	−58	0	

Source: BWFBadminton.com

Date	Time	Player 1	Score	Player 2	Set 1	Set 2	Set 3
8 February	18:00	Cynthia Mathez (Switzerland); Ilaria Olgiati (Switzerland)	2–0	(China) Li Jiaqi (China) Xu Tingting	21–10	21–13	
9 February	17:30	Cynthia Mathez (Switzerland); Ilaria Olgiati (Switzerland)	2–0	(Poland) Natalia Grzyb (Poland) Anna Wolny	21–2	21–8	
10 February	14:15	Li Jiaqi (China); Xu Tingting (China)	2–0	(Poland) Natalia Grzyb (Poland) Anna Wolny	21–9	21–7	

=== Group B ===
Pos	Team	Pld	W	L	GF	GA	GD	PF	PA	PD	Pts	Qualification
1	Onanong Phraikaeo (THA) Sujirat Pookkham (THA)	2	2	0	4	0	+4	84	31	+53	2	Knockout stage
2	Maria Gilda dos Santos Domingues Antunes (BRA) Auricélia Nunes Evangelista (BRA)	2	1	1	2	2	0	62	47	+15	1	Knockout stage
3	Ammu Mohan (IND) Prema Vishwas (IND)	2	0	2	0	4	−4	16	84	−68	0	

Source: BWFBadminton.com

Date	Time	Player 1	Score	Player 2	Set 1	Set 2	Set 3
8 February	18:00	Maria Gilda dos Santos Domingues Antunes (Brazil); Auricélia Nunes Evangelista (Brazil)	2–0	(India) Ammu Mohan (India) Prema Vishwas	21–2	21–3	
9 February	17:30	Maria Gilda dos Santos Domingues Antunes (Brazil); Auricélia Nunes Evangelista (Brazil)	0–2	(Thailand) Onanong Phraikaeo (Thailand) Sujirat Pookkham	7–21	13–21	
10 February	14:45	Ammu Mohan (India); Prema Vishwas (India)	0–2	(Thailand) Onanong Phraikaeo (Thailand) Sujirat Pookkham	6–21	5–21	

=== Group C ===
Pos	Team	Pld	W	L	GF	GA	GD	PF	PA	PD	Pts	Qualification
1	Liu Yutong (CHN) Yin Menglu (CHN)	3	3	0	6	0	+6	126	53	+73	3	Knockout stage
2	Alphia James (IND) Pallavi Kaluvehalli M. (IND)	3	2	1	4	2	+2	103	90	+13	2	Knockout stage
3	Hu Guang-chiou (TPE) Yang I-chen (TPE)	3	1	2	2	4	−2	89	101	−12	1	
4	Magdalena Kozera (POL) Heidi Manninen (FIN)	3	0	3	0	6	−6	52	126	−74	0	

Source: BWFBadminton.com

Date	Time	Player 1	Score	Player 2	Set 1	Set 2	Set 3
8 February	18:00	Hu Guang-chiou (Chinese Taipei); Yang I-chen (Chinese Taipei)	2–0	(Poland) Magdalena Kozera (Finland) Heidi Manninen	21–11	21–6	
8 February	18:00	Alphia James (India); Pallavi Kaluvehalli M. (India)	0–2	(China) Liu Yutong (China) Yin Menglu	5–21	14–21	
9 February	18:00	Hu Guang-chiou (Chinese Taipei); Yang I-chen (Chinese Taipei)	0–2	(India) Alphia James (India) Pallavi Kaluvehalli M.	8–21	17–21	
9 February	18:00	Magdalena Kozera (Poland); Heidi Manninen (Finland)	0–2	(China) Liu Yutong (China) Yin Menglu	7–21	5–21	
10 February	14:15	Hu Guang-chiou (Chinese Taipei); Yang I-chen (Chinese Taipei)	0–2	(China) Liu Yutong (China) Yin Menglu	13–21	9–21	
10 February	14:15	Magdalena Kozera (Poland); Heidi Manninen (Finland)	0–2	(India) Alphia James (India) Pallavi Kaluvehalli M.	15–21	8–21	

=== Group D ===
Pos	Team	Pld	W	L	GF	GA	GD	PF	PA	PD	Pts	Qualification
1	Fan Chaoyue (CHN) Li Hongyan (CHN)	2	2	0	4	0	+4	84	31	+53	2	Knockout stage
2	Jaquelin Karina Burgos Javier (PER) Pilar Jáuregui (PER)	2	1	1	2	2	0	61	58	+3	1	Knockout stage
3	Ana Gomes (BRA) Daniele Torres Souza (BRA)	2	0	2	0	4	−4	28	84	−56	0	
4	Mischa Ginns (AUS) Bree Wright (AUS) (Note: Mischa Ginns / Bree Wright withdrew during the tournament.)	0	0	0	0	0	0	0	0	0	0	Withdrew

Source: BWFBadminton.com
Notes:

Date	Time	Player 1	Score	Player 2	Set 1	Set 2	Set 3
8 February	17:30	Ana Gomes (Brazil); Daniele Torres Souza (Brazil)	~~1–2~~	(Australia) Mischa Ginns (Australia) Bree Wright	~~21–19~~	~~16–21~~	~~19–21~~
8 February	17:30	Jaquelin Karina Burgos Javier (Peru); Pilar Jáuregui (Peru)	0–2	(China) Fan Chaoyue (China) Li Hongyan	8–21	11–21	
9 February	17:30	Jaquelin Karina Burgos Javier (Peru); Pilar Jáuregui (Peru)	2–0	(Brazil) Ana Gomes (Brazil) Daniele Torres Souza	21–11	21–5	
9 February	18:00	Fan Chaoyue (China); Li Hongyan (China)	~~2–0~~	(Australia) Mischa Ginns (Australia) Bree Wright	~~21–4~~	~~21–12~~	
10 February	14:15	Jaquelin Karina Burgos Javier (Peru); Pilar Jáuregui (Peru)	Walkover	(Australia) Mischa Ginns (Australia) Bree Wright			
10 February	14:45	Fan Chaoyue (China); Li Hongyan (China)	2–0	(Brazil) Ana Gomes (Brazil) Daniele Torres Souza	21–8	21–4	

== Knockout stage ==
Quarter-finals
A1	(Switzerland) Cynthia Mathez (Switzerland) Ilaria Olgiati	21	21
C2	(India) Alphia James (India) Pallavi Kaluvehalli	11	13
C1	(China) Liu Yutong (China) Yin Menglu	21	21
A2	(China) Li Jiaqi (China) Xu Tingting	10	16
B2	(Brazil) Maria Gilda dos Santos Domingues Antunes (Brazil) Auricélia Nunes Evangelista	5	10
D1	(China) Fan Chaoyue (China) Li Hongyan	21	21
D2	(Peru) Jaquelin Karina Burgos Javier (Peru) Pilar Jáuregui	8	9
B1	(Thailand) Onanong Phraikaeo (Thailand) Sujirat Pookkham	21	21

Semi-finals
A1	(Switzerland) Cynthia Mathez (Switzerland) Ilaria Olgiati	4	4
C1	(China) Liu Yutong (China) Yin Menglu	21	21
D1	(China) Fan Chaoyue (China) Li Hongyan	21	21
B1	(Thailand) Onanong Phraikaeo (Thailand) Sujirat Pookkham	17	12

Final
C1	(China) Liu Yutong (China) Yin Menglu	21	21
D1	(China) Fan Chaoyue (China) Li Hongyan	14	13
