= 2026 BWF Para-Badminton World Championships – Women's Singles WH2 =

Women's Singles WH2 at 2026 BWF Para-Badminton World Championships
Tournament details
- Dates: 8–13 February 2026
- Competitors: 24
- Venue: Isa Sports City, Manama

The men's singles WH2 tournament at the 2026 BWF Para-Badminton World Championships took place from 8 to 13 February 2026 at Isa Sports City in Manama. A total of 24 players competed at the tournament.

== Classification ==
- WH2
  Players have impairment in one or both lower limbs and minimal or no impairment of the trunk and also require wheelchair

== Format ==
The 24 players were split into 8 groups of three players. They played a round-robin tournament with the top 2 players advancing to the knockout stage. Each match was played in a best-of-3.

== Seeds ==
These were the seeds for this event:

1. (Peru) Pilar Jáuregui (semi-finals)
2. (Switzerland) Ilaria Olgiati (quarter-finals)

== Group stage ==
All times are local (UTC+3).

=== Group A ===
| Pos | Team | Pld | W | L | GF | GA | GD | PF | PA | PD | Pts | Qualification |
|---|---|---|---|---|---|---|---|---|---|---|---|---|
| 1 | Pilar Jáuregui (PER) | 2 | 2 | 0 | 4 | 0 | +4 | 84 | 28 | +56 | 2 | Knockout stage |
| 2 | Narin Uluç (TUR) | 2 | 1 | 1 | 2 | 2 | 0 | 64 | 57 | +7 | 1 | Knockout stage |
| 3 | Elis Regina Franco (BRA) | 2 | 0 | 2 | 0 | 4 | −4 | 21 | 84 | −63 | 0 | |

Source: BWFBadminton.com

| Date | Time | Player 1 | Score | Player 2 | Set 1 | Set 2 | Set 3 |
|---|---|---|---|---|---|---|---|
| 8 February | 13:00 | Narin Uluç (Turkey) | 2–0 | (Brazil) Elis Regina Franco | 21–8 | 21–7 | |
| 9 February | 10:30 | Pilar Jáuregui (Peru) | 2–0 | (Turkey) Narin Uluç | 21–7 | 21–15 | |
| 9 February | 15:30 | Pilar Jáuregui (Peru) | 2–0 | (Brazil) Elis Regina Franco | 21–0 | 21–6 | |

=== Group B ===
| Pos | Team | Pld | W | L | GF | GA | GD | PF | PA | PD | Pts | Qualification |
|---|---|---|---|---|---|---|---|---|---|---|---|---|
| 1 | Ilaria Olgiati (SUI) | 2 | 2 | 0 | 4 | 0 | +4 | 84 | 31 | +53 | 2 | Knockout stage |
| 2 | Maya Alcaide (ESP) | 2 | 1 | 1 | 2 | 2 | 0 | 63 | 74 | −11 | 1 | Knockout stage |
| 3 | Maria Gilda dos Santos Domingues Antunes (BRA) | 2 | 0 | 2 | 0 | 4 | −4 | 42 | 84 | −42 | 0 | |

Source: BWFBadminton.com

| Date | Time | Player 1 | Score | Player 2 | Set 1 | Set 2 | Set 3 |
|---|---|---|---|---|---|---|---|
| 8 February | 14:00 | Maria Gilda dos Santos Domingues Antunes (Brazil) | 0–2 | (Spain) Maya Alcaide | 18–21 | 14–21 | |
| 9 February | 10:30 | Ilaria Olgiati (Switzerland) | 2–0 | (Brazil) Maria Gilda dos Santos Domingues Antunes | 21–5 | 21–5 | |
| 9 February | 15:30 | Ilaria Olgiati (Switzerland) | 2–0 | (Spain) Maya Alcaide | 21–10 | 21–11 | |

=== Group C ===
| Pos | Team | Pld | W | L | GF | GA | GD | PF | PA | PD | Pts | Qualification |
|---|---|---|---|---|---|---|---|---|---|---|---|---|
| 1 | Alphia James (IND) | 2 | 2 | 0 | 4 | 0 | +4 | 84 | 32 | +52 | 2 | Knockout stage |
| 2 | Shaimaa Samy Abdellatif (EGY) | 2 | 1 | 1 | 2 | 2 | 0 | 64 | 60 | +4 | 1 | Knockout stage |
| 3 | Sharon Jones-Barnes (ENG) | 2 | 0 | 2 | 0 | 4 | −4 | 28 | 84 | −56 | 0 | |

Source: BWFBadminton.com

| Date | Time | Player 1 | Score | Player 2 | Set 1 | Set 2 | Set 3 |
|---|---|---|---|---|---|---|---|
| 8 February | 13:00 | Sharon Jones-Barnes (England) | 0–2 | (Egypt) Shaimaa Samy Abdellatif | 13–21 | 5–21 | |
| 9 February | 11:00 | Alphia James (India) | 2–0 | (England) Sharon Jones-Barnes | 21–6 | 21–4 | |
| 9 February | 16:00 | Alphia James (India) | 2–0 | (Egypt) Shaimaa Samy Abdellatif | 21–14 | 21–8 | |

=== Group D ===
| Pos | Team | Pld | W | L | GF | GA | GD | PF | PA | PD | Pts | Qualification |
|---|---|---|---|---|---|---|---|---|---|---|---|---|
| 1 | Li Hongyan (CHN) | 2 | 2 | 0 | 4 | 0 | +4 | 84 | 37 | +47 | 2 | Knockout stage |
| 2 | Emine Seçkin (TUR) | 2 | 1 | 1 | 2 | 2 | 0 | 66 | 56 | +10 | 1 | Knockout stage |
| 3 | Ruchi Trivedi (IND) | 2 | 0 | 2 | 0 | 4 | −4 | 27 | 84 | −57 | 0 | |

Source: BWFBadminton.com

| Date | Time | Player 1 | Score | Player 2 | Set 1 | Set 2 | Set 3 |
|---|---|---|---|---|---|---|---|
| 8 February | 13:30 | Li Hongyan (China) | 2–0 | (India) Ruchi Trivedi | 21–5 | 21–8 | |
| 9 February | 11:00 | Emine Seçkin (Turkey) | 0–2 | (China) Li Hongyan | 15–21 | 9–21 | |
| 9 February | 16:00 | Emine Seçkin (Turkey) | 2–0 | (India) Ruchi Trivedi | 21–12 | 21–2 | |

=== Group E ===
| Pos | Team | Pld | W | L | GF | GA | GD | PF | PA | PD | Pts | Qualification |
|---|---|---|---|---|---|---|---|---|---|---|---|---|
| 1 | Mischa Ginns (AUS) | 2 | 2 | 0 | 4 | 0 | +4 | 84 | 25 | +59 | 2 | Knockout stage |
| 2 | Magdalena Kozera (POL) | 2 | 1 | 1 | 2 | 2 | 0 | 62 | 82 | −20 | 1 | Knockout stage |
| 3 | Ammu Mohan (IND) | 2 | 0 | 2 | 0 | 4 | −4 | 47 | 86 | −39 | 0 | |

Source: BWFBadminton.com

| Date | Time | Player 1 | Score | Player 2 | Set 1 | Set 2 | Set 3 |
|---|---|---|---|---|---|---|---|
| 8 February | 13:30 | Ammu Mohan (India) | 0–2 | (Poland) Magdalena Kozera | 19–21 | 21–23 | |
| 9 February | 11:00 | Mischa Ginns (Australia) | 2–0 | (India) Ammu Mohan | 21–7 | 21–0 | |
| 9 February | 16:00 | Mischa Ginns (Australia) | 2–0 | (Poland) Magdalena Kozera | 21–8 | 21–10 | |

=== Group F ===
| Pos | Team | Pld | W | L | GF | GA | GD | PF | PA | PD | Pts | Qualification |
|---|---|---|---|---|---|---|---|---|---|---|---|---|
| 1 | Annika Schröder (GER) | 2 | 2 | 0 | 4 | 1 | +3 | 94 | 64 | +30 | 2 | Knockout stage |
| 2 | Marilou Maurel (FRA) | 2 | 1 | 1 | 3 | 2 | +1 | 96 | 63 | +33 | 1 | Knockout stage |
| 3 | Siham Al Rushaidi (UAE) | 2 | 0 | 2 | 0 | 4 | −4 | 21 | 84 | −63 | 0 | |

Source: BWFBadminton.com

| Date | Time | Player 1 | Score | Player 2 | Set 1 | Set 2 | Set 3 |
|---|---|---|---|---|---|---|---|
| 8 February | 13:30 | Marilou Maurel (France) | 2–0 | (United Arab Emirates) Siham Al Rushaidi | 21–6 | 21–5 | |
| 9 February | 11:00 | Annika Schröder (Germany) | 2–1 | (France) Marilou Maurel | 10–21 | 21–17 | 21–16 |
| 9 February | 16:30 | Annika Schröder (Germany) | 2–0 | (United Arab Emirates) Siham Al Rushaidi | 21–3 | 21–7 | |

=== Group G ===
| Pos | Team | Pld | W | L | GF | GA | GD | PF | PA | PD | Pts | Qualification |
|---|---|---|---|---|---|---|---|---|---|---|---|---|
| 1 | Xu Tingting (CHN) | 2 | 2 | 0 | 4 | 1 | +3 | 103 | 55 | +48 | 2 | Knockout stage |
| 2 | Jung Gyeo-ul (KOR) | 2 | 1 | 1 | 3 | 2 | +1 | 79 | 80 | −1 | 1 | Knockout stage |
| 3 | Yang I-chen (TPE) | 2 | 0 | 2 | 0 | 4 | −4 | 37 | 84 | −47 | 0 | |

Source: BWFBadminton.com

| Date | Time | Player 1 | Score | Player 2 | Set 1 | Set 2 | Set 3 |
|---|---|---|---|---|---|---|---|
| 8 February | 13:30 | Xu Tingting (China) | 2–0 | (Chinese Taipei) Yang I-chen | 21–8 | 21–10 | |
| 9 February | 11:00 | Jung Gyeo-ul (South Korea) | 1–2 | (China) Xu Tingting | 21–19 | 9–21 | 7–21 |
| 9 February | 16:00 | Jung Gyeo-ul (South Korea) | 2–0 | (Chinese Taipei) Yang I-chen | 21–14 | 21–5 | |

=== Group H ===
| Pos | Team | Pld | W | L | GF | GA | GD | PF | PA | PD | Pts | Qualification |
|---|---|---|---|---|---|---|---|---|---|---|---|---|
| 1 | Liu Yutong (CHN) | 2 | 2 | 0 | 4 | 0 | +4 | 84 | 20 | +64 | 2 | Knockout stage |
| 2 | Amnouy Wetwithan (THA) | 2 | 1 | 1 | 2 | 2 | 0 | 56 | 50 | +6 | 1 | Knockout stage |
| 3 | Shabana (IND) | 2 | 0 | 2 | 0 | 4 | −4 | 14 | 84 | −70 | 0 | |

Source: BWFBadminton.com

| Date | Time | Player 1 | Score | Player 2 | Set 1 | Set 2 | Set 3 |
|---|---|---|---|---|---|---|---|
| 8 February | 13:00 | Shabana (India) | 0–2 | (Thailand) Amnouy Wetwithan | 1–21 | 7–21 | |
| 9 February | 11:30 | Liu Yutong (China) | 2–0 | (India) Shabana | 21–4 | 21–2 | |
| 9 February | 16:00 | Liu Yutong (China) | 2–0 | (Thailand) Amnouy Wetwithan | 21–6 | 21–8 | |

== Knockout stage ==
Round of 16
A1 | (Peru) Pilar Jáuregui | 21 | 21
B2 | (Spain) Maya Alcaide | 7 | 4
F1 | (Germany) Annika Schröder | 7 | 11
D2 | (Turkey) Emine Seçkin | 21 | 21
C1 | (India) Alphia James | 21 | 21
E2 | (Poland) Magdalena Kozera | 4 | 9
H1 | (China) Liu Yutong | 21 | 21
A2 | (Turkey) Narin Uluç | 6 | 8
H2 | (Thailand) Amnouy Wetwithan | 22 | 21
E1 | (Australia) Mischa Ginns | 20 | 7
G2 | (South Korea) Jung Gyeo-ul | 9 | 17
D1 | (China) Li Hongyan | 21 | 21
F2 | (France) Marilou Maurel | 7 | 7
G1 | (China) Xu Tingting | 21 | 21
C2 | (Egypt) Shaimaa Samy Abdellatif | 9 | 10
B1 | (Switzerland) Ilaria Olgiati | 21 | 21

Quarter-finals
A1 | (Peru) Pilar Jáuregui | 21 | 21
D2 | (Turkey) Emine Seçkin | 17 | 14
C1 | (India) Alphia James | 3 | 4
H1 | (China) Liu Yutong | 21 | 21
H2 | (Thailand) Amnouy Wetwithan | 11 | 7
D1 | (China) Li Hongyan | 21 | 21
G1 | (China) Xu Tingting | 21 | 21
B1 | (Switzerland) Ilaria Olgiati | 17 | 11

Semi-finals
A1 | (Peru) Pilar Jáuregui | 7 | 4
H1 | (China) Liu Yutong | 21 | 21
D1 | (China) Li Hongyan | 20 | 13
G1 | (China) Xu Tingting | 21 | 21

Final
H1 | (China) Liu Yutong | 21 | 21
G1 | (China) Xu Tingting | 13 | 11
