= 2026 BWF Para-Badminton World Championships =

Tournament details
- Dates: 8–14 February 2026
- Edition: 15th
- Level: International
- Venue: Isa Sports City
- Location: Manama, Bahrain

The 2026 BWF Para-Badminton World Championships (Arabic: بطولة العالم للريشة الطائرة لذوي الاحتياجات الخاصة 2026) was the 15th edition of the BWF Para-Badminton World Championships, organised by the Badminton World Federation. It was held from 8 to 14 February 2026 in Manama, Bahrain.

== Host city selection ==
In October 2025, the Badminton World Federation signed an agreement with the Bahrain Paralympic Committee to host the tournament in the capital city of Manama. Bahrain has become the first country in the Middle East to host the BWF Para Badminton World Championships.

== Point distribution ==
Below is the table with the point distribution for each phase of the tournament based on the BWF points system for the Para World Championships event.

Winner	Runner-up	3/4	5/8	9/16	17/32	33/64
13,800	11,200	9,100	6,750	6,500	4,410	3,920

== Medalists ==
=== Men's events ===
Singles

Event	Gold	Silver	Bronze
WH1 details	(China) Qu Zimo	(Japan) Keita Nishimura	(South Korea) Choi Jung-man
WH1 details	(China) Qu Zimo	(Japan) Keita Nishimura	(Malaysia) Muhammad Ikhwan Ramli
WH2 details	(Japan) Daiki Kajiwara	(South Korea) Yu Soo-young	(South Korea) Kim Jung-jun
WH2 details	(Japan) Daiki Kajiwara	(South Korea) Yu Soo-young	(China) Zhao Xin
SL3 details	(India) Pramod Bhagat	(Indonesia) Muhammad Al Imran	(India) Kumar Nitesh
SL3 details	(India) Pramod Bhagat	(Indonesia) Muhammad Al Imran	(Thailand) Mongkhon Bunsun
SL4 details	(France) Lucas Mazur	(India) Naveen Sivakumar	(Nigeria) Jeremiah Nnanna
SL4 details	(France) Lucas Mazur	(India) Naveen Sivakumar	(India) Sukant Kadam
SU5 details	(Malaysia) Cheah Liek Hou	(Chinese Taipei) Fang Jen-yu	(Turkey) İlker Tuzcu
SU5 details	(Malaysia) Cheah Liek Hou	(Chinese Taipei) Fang Jen-yu	(Japan) Taiyo Imai
SH6 details	(United States) Miles Krajewski	(Thailand) Natthapong Meechai	(England) Jack Shephard
SH6 details	(United States) Miles Krajewski	(Thailand) Natthapong Meechai	(India) Krishna Nagar

Doubles

Event	Gold	Silver	Bronze
WH1–WH2 details	(China) Mai Jianpeng (China) Qu Zimo	(South Korea) Park Hae-seong (South Korea) Yu Soo-young	(France) Thomas Jakobs (France) David Toupé
WH1–WH2 details	(China) Mai Jianpeng (China) Qu Zimo	(South Korea) Park Hae-seong (South Korea) Yu Soo-young	(Japan) Daiki Kajiwara (Japan) Keita Nishimura
SL3–SL4 details	(India) Pramod Bhagat (India) Sukant Kadam	(India) Jagadesh Dilli (India) Naveen Sivakumar	(South Korea) Cho Na-dan (South Korea) Lee Seung-hu
SL3–SL4 details	(India) Pramod Bhagat (India) Sukant Kadam	(India) Jagadesh Dilli (India) Naveen Sivakumar	(India) Umesh Vikram Kumar (India) Suryakant Yadav
SU5 details	(Malaysia) Mohamad Faris Ahmad Azri (Malaysia) Cheah Liek Hou	(Chinese Taipei) Fang Jen-yu (Chinese Taipei) Pu Gui-yu	(China) He Zhirui (China) Li Mingpan
SU5 details	(Malaysia) Mohamad Faris Ahmad Azri (Malaysia) Cheah Liek Hou	(Chinese Taipei) Fang Jen-yu (Chinese Taipei) Pu Gui-yu	(Thailand) Pricha Somsiri (Thailand) Nattaphon Thaweesap
SH6 details	(China) Lin Naili (China) Zeng Qingtao	(South Korea) Lee Dae-sung (Thailand) Natthapong Meechai	(Hong Kong) Chu Man Kai (Hong Kong) Wong Chun Yim
SH6 details	(China) Lin Naili (China) Zeng Qingtao	(South Korea) Lee Dae-sung (Thailand) Natthapong Meechai	(United States) Miles Krajewski (Brazil) Vitor Tavares

=== Women's events ===
Singles

Event	Gold	Silver	Bronze
WH1 details	(Japan) Sarina Satomi	(China) Yin Menglu	(Thailand) Sujirat Pookkham
WH1 details	(Japan) Sarina Satomi	(China) Yin Menglu	(Japan) Sena Tomoyose
WH2 details	(China) Liu Yutong	(China) Xu Tingting	(Peru) Pilar Jáuregui
WH2 details	(China) Liu Yutong	(China) Xu Tingting	(China) Li Hongyan
SL3 details	(Japan) Shino Kawai	(Nigeria) Mariam Eniola Bolaji	(China) Yuan Gaoying
SL3 details	(Japan) Shino Kawai	(Nigeria) Mariam Eniola Bolaji	(China) Xiao Zuxian
SL4 details	(Indonesia) Leani Ratri Oktila	(China) Huang Zixuan	(Indonesia) Khalimatus Sadiyah
SL4 details	(Indonesia) Leani Ratri Oktila	(China) Huang Zixuan	(Norway) Helle Sofie Sagøy
SU5 details	(China) Yang Qiuxia	(India) Manisha Ramdass	(France) Maud Lefort
SU5 details	(China) Yang Qiuxia	(India) Manisha Ramdass	(India) Thulasimathi Murugesan
SH6 details	(China) Li Fengmei	(India) Nithya Sre Sivan	(China) Lin Shuangbao
SH6 details	(China) Li Fengmei	(India) Nithya Sre Sivan	(Indonesia) Rina Marlina

Doubles

Event	Gold	Silver	Bronze
WH1–WH2 details	(China) Liu Yutong (China) Yin Menglu	(China) Fan Chaoyue (China) Li Hongyan	(Switzerland) Cynthia Mathez (Switzerland) Ilaria Olgiati
WH1–WH2 details	(China) Liu Yutong (China) Yin Menglu	(China) Fan Chaoyue (China) Li Hongyan	(Thailand) Onanong Phraikaeo (Thailand) Sujirat Pookkham
SL3–SU5 details	(China) Xiao Zuxian (China) Yang Qiuxia	(Indonesia) Leani Ratri Oktila (Indonesia) Khalimatus Sadiyah	(India) Manasi Joshi (India) Thulasimathi Murugesan
SL3–SU5 details	(China) Xiao Zuxian (China) Yang Qiuxia	(Indonesia) Leani Ratri Oktila (Indonesia) Khalimatus Sadiyah	(China) Li Tongtong (China) Liu Yuemei
SH6 details	(China) Li Fengmei (China) Lin Shuangbao	(Egypt) Yasmina Eissa (United States) Jayci Simon	(Poland) Daria Bujnicka (Poland) Oliwia Szmigiel
SH6 details	(China) Li Fengmei (China) Lin Shuangbao	(Egypt) Yasmina Eissa (United States) Jayci Simon	(Chinese Taipei) Cai Yi-lin (Chinese Taipei) Wu Yu-yen

=== Mixed events ===
Doubles

Event	Gold	Silver	Bronze
WH1–WH2 details	(China) Qu Zimo (China) Liu Yutong	(India) Prem Kumar Ale (India) Alphia James	(Chile) Jaime Aránguiz (Belgium) Man-Kei To
WH1–WH2 details	(China) Qu Zimo (China) Liu Yutong	(India) Prem Kumar Ale (India) Alphia James	(South Korea) Park Hae-seong (South Korea) Jung Gyeo-ul
SL3–SU5 details	(Indonesia) Hikmat Ramdani (Indonesia) Leani Ratri Oktila	(China) Yang Jianyuan (China) Yang Qiuxia	(India) Chirag Baretha (India) Mandeep Kaur
SL3–SU5 details	(Indonesia) Hikmat Ramdani (Indonesia) Leani Ratri Oktila	(China) Yang Jianyuan (China) Yang Qiuxia	(China) Li Mingpan (China) Xiao Zuxian
SH6 details	(China) Lin Naili (China) Li Fengmei	(China) Zeng Qingtao (China) Lin Shuangbao	(Indonesia) Subhan (Indonesia) Rina Marlina
SH6 details	(China) Lin Naili (China) Li Fengmei	(China) Zeng Qingtao (China) Lin Shuangbao	(India) Krishna Nagar (India) Nithya Sre Sivan

== Medal table ==
* Host nation (Bahrain)

Rank	Nation	Gold	Silver	Bronze	Total
1	China	11	6	8	25
2	Japan	3	1	3	7
3	India	2	5	8	15
4	Indonesia	2	2	3	7
5	Malaysia	2	0	1	3
6	United States	1	0.5	0.5	2
7	France	1	0	2	3
8	South Korea	0	2.5	4	6.5
9	Chinese Taipei	0	2	1	3
10	Thailand	0	1.5	4	5.5
11	Nigeria	0	1	1	2
12	Egypt	0	0.5	0	0.5
13	England	0	0	1	1
13	Hong Kong	0	0	1	1
13	Norway	0	0	1	1
13	Peru	0	0	1	1
13	Poland	0	0	1	1
13	Switzerland	0	0	1	1
13	Turkey	0	0	1	1
20	Belgium	0	0	0.5	0.5
20	Brazil	0	0	0.5	0.5
20	Chile	0	0	0.5	0.5
Totals (22 entries)		22	22	44	88

== Results ==
=== Men's Singles WH1 ===
Round of 16
A1	(Malaysia) Muhammad Ikhwan Ramli	21	21
F2	(United Arab Emirates) Omair Muhammad	9	7
F1	(Brazil) Marcelo Alves Conceição	19	21	21
D2	(Chinese Taipei) Ong Yu-yu	21	12	4
D1	(Italy) Yuri Ferrigno	5	8
B2	(Japan) Hiroto Iizuka	21	21
H1	(China) Qu Zimo	21	21
A2	(Spain) Francisco Motero	8	10
C2	(India) Prem Kumar Ale	8	15
E1	(India) Shashank Kumar	21	21
H2	(France) David Toupé	9	9
C1	(Japan) Keita Nishimura	21	21
E2	(Israel) Konstantin Afinogenov	7	12
G1	(South Korea) Park Hae-seong	21	21
G2	(Egypt) Tarek Abbas Gharib Zahry	5	11
B1	(South Korea) Choi Jung-man	21	21

Quarter-finals
A1	(Malaysia) Muhammad Ikhwan Ramli	21	21
F1	(Brazil) Marcelo Alves Conceição	10	14
B2	(Japan) Hiroto Iizuka	14	18
H1	(China) Qu Zimo	21	21
E1	(India) Shashank Kumar	11	7
C1	(Japan) Keita Nishimura	21	21
G1	(South Korea) Park Hae-seong	8	15
B1	(South Korea) Choi Jung-man	21	21

Semi-finals
A1	(Malaysia) Muhammad Ikhwan Ramli	9	10
H1	(China) Qu Zimo	21	21
C1	(Japan) Keita Nishimura	21	11	21
B1	(South Korea) Choi Jung-man	19	21	18

Final
H1	(China) Qu Zimo	21	21
C1	(Japan) Keita Nishimura	9	13

=== Men's Singles WH2 ===
Round of 16
A1	(Japan) Daiki Kajiwara	21	21
G2	(Indonesia) Supriadi	3	9
G1	(Switzerland) Luca Olgiati	16	16
C2	(Indonesia) Wiwin Andri	21	21
C1	(Germany) Rick Hellmann	21	21
H2	(France) Thomas Jakobs	8	9
H1	(China) Zhao Xin	21	21
E2	(Brazil) Julio Cesar Godoy	8	10
B2	(Australia) Grant Manzoney	7	5
E1	(Chile) Jaime Aránguiz	21	21
A2	(China) Mai Jianpeng	21	14
D1	(South Korea) Yu Soo-young	23	21
D2	(Thailand) Kittichai Rakjaingam	8	8
F1	(Japan) Reo Oyama	21	21
F2	(Malaysia) Noor Azwan Noorlan	15	9
B1	(South Korea) Kim Jung-jun	21	21

Quarter-finals
A1	(Japan) Daiki Kajiwara	21	21
C2	(Indonesia) Wiwin Andri	4	8
C1	(Germany) Rick Hellmann	17	18
H1	(China) Zhao Xin	21	21
E1	(Chile) Jaime Aránguiz	9	14
D1	(South Korea) Yu Soo-young	21	21
F1	(Japan) Reo Oyama	10	15
B1	(South Korea) Kim Jung-jun	21	21

Semi-finals
A1	(Japan) Daiki Kajiwara	21	21
H1	(China) Zhao Xin	5	5
D1	(South Korea) Yu Soo-young	21	21
B1	(South Korea) Kim Jung-jun	10	15

Final
A1	(Japan) Daiki Kajiwara	23	21
D1	(South Korea) Yu Soo-young	21	13

=== Men's Singles SL3 ===
Round of 16
A1	(India) Kumar Nitesh	20	21	21
C2	(Ukraine) Oleksandr Chyrkov	22	15	9
H1	(France) Mathieu Thomas	21	24	21
D2	(India) Manoj Sarkar	18	26	17
C1	(China) Xiong Lichuan	21	21
B2	(New Zealand) Rishikesh Venu	8	12
G1	(Indonesia) Muhammad Al Imran	21	21
H2	(China) Chen Xiaoyu	14	13
G2	(China) Yi Yuzhe	15	23	21
F1	(Japan) Daisuke Fujihara	21	21	12
E2	(South Korea) Lee Seung-hu	21	4	13
D1	(Thailand) Mongkhon Bunsun	19	21	21
A2	(Spain) Simon Cruz	9	14
E1	(India) Umesh Vikram Kumar	21	21
F2	(France) Thomas Numitor	8	6
B1	(India) Pramod Bhagat	21	21

Quarter-finals
A1	(India) Kumar Nitesh	21	21
H1	(France) Mathieu Thomas	10	11
C1	(China) Xiong Lichuan	18	11
G1	(Indonesia) Muhammad Al Imran	21	21
G2	(China) Yi Yuzhe	11	19
D1	(Thailand) Mongkhon Bunsun	21	21
E1	(India) Umesh Vikram Kumar	17	13
B1	(India) Pramod Bhagat	21	21

Semi-finals
A1	(India) Kumar Nitesh	21	17	11
G1	(Indonesia) Muhammad Al Imran	12	21	21
D1	(Thailand) Mongkhon Bunsun	19	17
B1	(India) Pramod Bhagat	21	21

Final
G1	(Indonesia) Muhammad Al Imran	12	18
B1	(India) Pramod Bhagat	21	21

=== Men's Singles SL4 ===
Round of 16
1/A1	(France) Lucas Mazur	21	21
B2	(Thailand) Siripong Teamarrom	7	17
H1	(Indonesia) Fredy Setiawan	21	21
D2	(France) Mathis Clement	13	13
D1	(India) Sukant Kadam	19	21	21
G2	(Portugal) Diogo Daniel	21	16	18
F1	(South Korea) Cho Na-dan	21	23
A2	(Mexico) Maximiliano Avila Sosa	17	21
F2	(Sweden) Dilan Jacobsson	19	22	21
G1	(Indonesia) Hikmat Ramdani	21	20	17
H2	(Nigeria) Jeremiah Nnanna	21	21
C1	(India) Surya Kant Yadav	16	13
C2	(Germany) Nils Böning	14	15
E1	(Germany) Marcel Adam	21	21
E2	(South Korea) Shin Kyung-hwan	7	7
2/B1	(India) Naveen Sivakumar	21	21

Quarter-finals
1/A1	(France) Lucas Mazur	21	21
H1	(Indonesia) Fredy Setiawan	16	19
D1	(India) Sukant Kadam	21	24
F1	(South Korea) Cho Na-dan	19	22
F2	(Sweden) Dilan Jacobsson	21	19	20
H2	(Nigeria) Jeremiah Nnanna	17	21	22
E1	(Germany) Marcel Adam	19	9
2/B1	(India) Naveen Sivakumar	21	21

Semi-finals
1/A1	(France) Lucas Mazur	21	21
D1	(India) Sukant Kadam	16	3
H2	(Nigeria) Jeremiah Nnanna	9	14
2/B1	(India) Naveen Sivakumar	21	21

Final
1/A1	(France) Lucas Mazur	21	19	21
2/B1	(India) Naveen Sivakumar	12	21	14

=== Men's Singles SU5 ===
Round of 16
1/A1	(Malaysia) Cheah Liek Hou	21	21
H2	(South Korea) Kim Gi-yeon	15	10
E1	(India) Ruthick Ragupathi	21	21
B2	(Singapore) Tay Wei Ming	3	12
C1	(South Korea) Lee Jeong-soo	14	17
F2	(Wales) David Jack Wilson	21	21
H1	(Chinese Taipei) Pu Gui-yu	21	22	12
C2	(Japan) Taiyo Imai	18	24	21
D2	(India) Hardik Makkar	12	15
G1	(China) Li Mingpan	21	21
G2	(England) Robert Donald	17	15
D1	(Chinese Taipei) Fang Jen-yu	21	21
A2	(Turkey) İlker Tuzcu	21	21
F1	(Poland) Bartłomiej Mróz	19	14
E2	(Thailand) Nattaphon Thaweesap	17	15
2/B1	(France) Méril Loquette	21	21

Quarter-finals
1/A1	(Malaysia) Cheah Liek Hou	21	21
E1	(India) Ruthick Ragupathi	12	11
F2	(Wales) David Jack Wilson	14	11
C2	(Japan) Taiyo Imai	21	21
G1	(China) Li Mingpan	19	11
D1	(Chinese Taipei) Fang Jen-yu	21	21
A2	(Turkey) İlker Tuzcu	21	21
2/B1	(France) Méril Loquette	16	19

Semi-finals
1/A1	(Malaysia) Cheah Liek Hou	21	22
C2	(Japan) Taiyo Imai	12	20
D1	(Chinese Taipei) Fang Jen-yu	21	21
A2	(Turkey) İlker Tuzcu	13	16

Final
1/A1	(Malaysia) Cheah Liek Hou	21	21
D1	(Chinese Taipei) Fang Jen-yu	6	11

=== Men's Singles SH6 ===
Seeds

1. (France) Charles Noakes (round of 16)
2. (India) Krishna Nagar (semi-finals)

Round of 16
1	(France) Charles Noakes	21	18	18
(Indonesia) Subhan	10	21	21
(England) Jack Shephard	21	21
(Canada) Anthony Vibol Hay	4	4
(Thailand) Natthapong Meechai	21	21
(China) Zeng Qingtao	18	14
(Hong Kong) Chu Man Kai	21	21
(Peru) Nilton Quispe	8	8
(South Korea) Lee Dae-sung	21	13	21
(Malaysia) Muhammad Amin Azmi	16	21	19
(United States) Miles Krajewski	21	21
(Brazil) Vitor Tavares	12	15
(India) Sudarsan Saravanakumar Muthusamy	10	8
(China) Lin Naili	21	21
(Spain) Iván Segura	8	14
2	(India) Krishna Nagar	21	21

Quarter-finals
(Indonesia) Subhan	13	19
(England) Jack Shephard	21	21
(Thailand) Natthapong Meechai	19	21	21
(Hong Kong) Chu Man Kai	21	10	16
(South Korea) Lee Dae-sung	8	12
(United States) Miles Krajewski	21	21
(China) Lin Naili	21	13	20
2	(India) Krishna Nagar	11	21	22

Semi-finals
(England) Jack Shephard	15	11
(Thailand) Natthapong Meechai	21	21
(United States) Miles Krajewski	21	21
2	(India) Krishna Nagar	18	14

Final
(Thailand) Natthapong Meechai	19	20
(United States) Miles Krajewski	21	22

=== Men's Doubles WH1–WH2 ===
Round of 16
A1	(Malaysia) Noor Azwan Noorlan (Malaysia) Muhammad Ikhwan Ramli	21	21
H2	(Israel) Konstantin Afinogenov (Israel) Amir Levi	3	9
E1	(South Korea) Park Hae-seong (South Korea) Yu Soo-young	21	21
F2	(Germany) Rick Hellmann (Spain) Francisco Motero	14	8
D1	(India) Prem Kumar Ale (India) Abu Hubaida	16	19
E2	(Italy) Yuri Ferrigno (Switzerland) Luca Olgiati	21	21
H1	(France) Thomas Jakobs (France) David Toupé	21	21
B2	(Thailand) Jakarin Homhual (Thailand) Kittichai Rakjaingam	9	11
C2	(India) Munna Khalid (India) Shashank Kumar	21	19	16
F1	(Brazil) Marcelo Alves Conceição (Brazil) Julio Cesar Godoy	14	21	21
G2	(Indonesia) Supriadi (Indonesia) Agung Widodo	14	11
C1	(Japan) Daiki Kajiwara (Japan) Keita Nishimura	21	21
D2	(Czech Republic) Luděk Benada (Germany) Jan-Gerriet Janssen	5	2
G1	(China) Mai Jianpeng (China) Qu Zimo	21	21
A2	(Switzerland) Marc Elmer (Czech Republic) Kamil Šnajdar	11	4
B1	(South Korea) Choi Jung-man (South Korea) Kim Jung-jun	21	21

Quarter-finals
A1	(Malaysia) Noor Azwan Noorlan (Malaysia) Muhammad Ikhwan Ramli	16	24
E1	(South Korea) Park Hae-seong (South Korea) Yu Soo-young	21	26
E2	(Italy) Yuri Ferrigno (Switzerland) Luca Olgiati	11	11
H1	(France) Thomas Jakobs (France) David Toupé	21	21
F1	(Brazil) Marcelo Alves Conceição (Brazil) Julio Cesar Godoy	13	9
C1	(Japan) Daiki Kajiwara (Japan) Keita Nishimura	21	21
G1	(China) Mai Jianpeng (China) Qu Zimo	21	21
B1	(South Korea) Choi Jung-man (South Korea) Kim Jung-jun	6	14

Semi-finals
E1	(South Korea) Park Hae-seong (South Korea) Yu Soo-young	21	21
H1	(France) Thomas Jakobs (France) David Toupé	10	13
C1	(Japan) Daiki Kajiwara (Japan) Keita Nishimura	17	21	9
G1	(China) Mai Jianpeng (China) Qu Zimo	21	15	21

Final
E1	(South Korea) Park Hae-seong (South Korea) Yu Soo-young	16	17
G1	(China) Mai Jianpeng (China) Qu Zimo	21	21

=== Men's Doubles SL3–SL4 ===
Seeds

1. (India) Pramod Bhagat / (India) Sukant Kadam (champion)
2. (India) Jagadesh Dilli / (India) Naveen Sivakumar (final)

Round of 16
(China) Xiong Lichuan (China) Gao Yuyang	14	16
(South Korea) Joo Dong-jae (South Korea) Shin Kyung-hwan	21	21
(Thailand) Mongkhon Bunsun (Thailand) Siripong Teamarrom	16	22
(South Korea) Cho Na-dan (South Korea) Lee Seung-hu	21	24
(France) Teddy Ferrazza (France) Thomas Numitor	9	9
(Germany) Marcel Adam (England) Curnow Pirbhai-Clarke	21	21
(Ukraine) Oleksandr Chyrkov (Sweden) Dilan Jacobsson	21	21
(Peru) Renzo Diquez Bances Morales (Peru) Gerson Jair Vargas Lostaunau	18	16

Quarter-finals
1	(India) Pramod Bhagat (India) Sukant Kadam	21	21
(South Korea) Joo Dong-jae (South Korea) Shin Kyung-hwan	17	13
(India) Deep Ranjan Bisoyee (India) Manoj Sarkar	15	20
(South Korea) Cho Na-dan (South Korea) Lee Seung-hu	21	22
(Germany) Marcel Adam (England) Curnow Pirbhai-Clarke	19	10
(India) Umesh Vikram Kumar (India) Surya Kant Yadav	21	21
(Ukraine) Oleksandr Chyrkov (Sweden) Dilan Jacobsson	21	10	12
2	(India) Jagadesh Dilli (India) Naveen Sivakumar	15	21	21

Semi-finals
1	(India) Pramod Bhagat (India) Sukant Kadam	21	21
(South Korea) Cho Na-dan (South Korea) Lee Seung-hu	13	15
(India) Umesh Vikram Kumar (India) Surya Kant Yadav	13	21	15
2	(India) Jagadesh Dilli (India) Naveen Sivakumar	21	12	21

Final
1	(India) Pramod Bhagat (India) Sukant Kadam	21	21
2	(India) Jagadesh Dilli (India) Naveen Sivakumar	19	16

=== Men's Doubles SU5 ===
Seeds

1. (India) Hardik Makkar / (India) Ruthick Ragupathi (quarter-finals)
2. (Chinese Taipei) Fang Jen-yu / (Chinese Taipei) Pu Gui-yu (final)

Quarter-finals
(Malaysia) Mohamad Faris Ahmad Azri (Malaysia) Cheah Liek Hou	21	21
(India) Sumith Kumar Garg (India) Mahammad Shaheer Hussain Shaik	16	3
(Thailand) Pricha Somsiri (Thailand) Nattaphon Thaweesap	22	21	21
1	(India) Hardik Makkar (India) Ruthick Ragupathi	24	17	11
(India) Rakesh Pandey (India) Dev Rathi	19	7
(China) He Zhirui (China) Li Mingpan	21	21
(India) Raj Kumar (India) Chirag Baretha	14	19
2	(Chinese Taipei) Fang Jen-yu (Chinese Taipei) Pu Gui-yu	21	21

Semi-finals
(Malaysia) Mohamad Faris Ahmad Azri (Malaysia) Cheah Liek Hou	21	21
(Thailand) Pricha Somsiri (Thailand) Nattaphon Thaweesap	14	14
(China) He Zhirui (China) Li Mingpan	19	21	13
2	(Chinese Taipei) Fang Jen-yu (Chinese Taipei) Pu Gui-yu	21	12	21

Final
(Malaysia) Mohamad Faris Ahmad Azri (Malaysia) Cheah Liek Hou	23	21
(Chinese Taipei) Fang Jen-yu (Chinese Taipei) Pu Gui-yu	21	13

=== Men's Doubles SH6 ===
Seeds

1. (India) Sudarsan Saravanakumar Muthusamy / (India) Sivarajan Solaimalai
2. (Brazil) Vitor Tavares / (United States) Miles Krajewski

=== Women's Singles WH1 ===
Round of 16
A1	(Japan) Sarina Satomi	21	21
G2	(Peru) Jaquelin Karina Burgos Javier	3	1
G1	(China) Fan Chaoyue	21	21
D2	(Brazil) Auricélia Nunes Evangelista	11	11
D1	(Japan) Sena Tomoyose	21	21
F2	(Brazil) Ana Gomes	5	11
E1	(Chinese Taipei) Hu Guang-chiou	21	21
H2	(Australia) Macka Mackenzie	5	4
A2	(Australia) Bree Wright	2	8
H1	(China) Yin Menglu	21	21
B2	(Belgium) Man-Kei To	21	14	21
C1	(Switzerland) Cynthia Mathez	15	21	19
E2	(China) Li Jiaqi	6	3
F1	(Thailand) Sujirat Pookkham	21	21
C2	(Brazil) Daniele Torres Souza	5	7
B1	(Thailand) Onanong Phraikaeo	21	21

Quarter-finals
A1	(Japan) Sarina Satomi	21	21
G1	(China) Fan Chaoyue	13	13
D1	(Japan) Sena Tomoyose	21	21
E1	(Chinese Taipei) Hu Guang-chiou	8	8
H1	(China) Yin Menglu	21	21
B2	(Belgium) Man-Kei To	19	17
F1	(Thailand) Sujirat Pookkham	21	21
B1	(Thailand) Onanong Phraikaeo	13	7

Semi-finals
A1	(Japan) Sarina Satomi	21	21
D1	(Japan) Sena Tomoyose	15	17
H1	(China) Yin Menglu	21	19	21
F1	(Thailand) Sujirat Pookkham	10	21	15

Final
A1	(Japan) Sarina Satomi	17	21	21
H1	(China) Yin Menglu	21	13	16

=== Women's Singles WH2 ===
Round of 16
A1	(Peru) Pilar Jáuregui	21	21
B2	(Spain) Maya Alcaide	7	4
F1	(Germany) Annika Schröder	7	11
D2	(Turkey) Emine Seçkin	21	21
C1	(India) Alphia James	21	21
E2	(Poland) Magdalena Kozera	4	9
H1	(China) Liu Yutong	21	21
A2	(Turkey) Narin Uluç	6	8
H2	(Thailand) Amnouy Wetwithan	22	21
E1	(Australia) Mischa Ginns	20	7
G2	(South Korea) Jung Gyeo-ul	9	17
D1	(China) Li Hongyan	21	21
F2	(France) Marilou Maurel	7	7
G1	(China) Xu Tingting	21	21
C2	(Egypt) Shaimaa Samy Abdellatif	9	10
B1	(Switzerland) Ilaria Olgiati	21	21

Quarter-finals
A1	(Peru) Pilar Jáuregui	21	21
D2	(Turkey) Emine Seçkin	17	14
C1	(India) Alphia James	3	4
H1	(China) Liu Yutong	21	21
H2	(Thailand) Amnouy Wetwithan	11	7
D1	(China) Li Hongyan	21	21
G1	(China) Xu Tingting	21	21
B1	(Switzerland) Ilaria Olgiati	17	11

Semi-finals
A1	(Peru) Pilar Jáuregui	7	4
H1	(China) Liu Yutong	21	21
D1	(China) Li Hongyan	20	13
G1	(China) Xu Tingting	21	21

Final
H1	(China) Liu Yutong	21	21
G1	(China) Xu Tingting	13	11

=== Women's Singles SL3 ===
Round of 16
A1	(Indonesia) Qonitah Ikhtiar Syakuroh	21	21
G2	(India) Manasi Girishchandra Joshi	13	9
E1	(Japan) Shino Kawai	21	21
C2	(Israel) Roni Kesten	1	1
D1	(China) Gu Feifei	21	21
H2	(Australia) Céline Vinot	19	11
G1	(Malaysia) Siti Maisarah binti Mat Lawani	9	18
E2	(China) Xiao Zuxian	21	21
F2	(Mexico) Maria Guadalupe Rojas Perez	9	14
H1	(China) Yuan Gaoying	21	21
B2	(Australia) Caitlin Dransfield	21	21
C1	(India) Mandeep Kaur	15	11
A2	(China) Liu Yuemei	15	6
F1	(Turkey) Halime Yıldız	21	21
D2	(France) Milena Surreau	13	12
B1	(Nigeria) Mariam Eniola Bolaji	21	21

Quarter-finals
A1	(Indonesia) Qonitah Ikhtiar Syakuroh	6	14
E1	(Japan) Shino Kawai	21	21
D1	(China) Gu Feifei	17	13
E2	(China) Xiao Zuxian	21	21
H1	(China) Yuan Gaoying	17	21	21
B2	(Australia) Caitlin Dransfield	21	17	15
F1	(Turkey) Halime Yıldız	6	9
B1	(Nigeria) Mariam Eniola Bolaji	21	21

Semi-finals
E1	(Japan) Shino Kawai	20	21	21
E2	(China) Xiao Zuxian	22	15	14
H1	(China) Yuan Gaoying	12	16
B1	(Nigeria) Mariam Eniola Bolaji	21	21

Final
E1	(Japan) Shino Kawai	21	21
B1	(Nigeria) Mariam Eniola Bolaji	14	17

=== Women's Singles SL4 ===
Seeds

1. (Norway) Helle Sofie Sagøy (semi-finals)
2. (Indonesia) Khalimatus Sadiyah (semi-finals)

Round of 16
(France) Marjorie Boigeol	21	21
(Brazil) Edwarda Dias	8	8
(Indonesia) Leani Ratri Oktila	21	21
(Turkey) Tuğçe Çelik	12	10
(China) Huang Zixuan	21	21
(Thailand) Chanida Srinavakul	12	8
(England) Emma Louise Stoner	21	21
(Australia) Arika Shetty	18	19

Quarter-finals
1	(Norway) Helle Sofie Sagøy	21	21
(France) Marjorie Boigeol	10	13
(China) Cheng Hefang	22	19
(Indonesia) Leani Ratri Oktila	24	21
(China) Huang Zixuan	21	21
(Brazil) Ana Carolina Coutinho Reis	17	18
(England) Emma Louise Stoner	13	6
2	(Indonesia) Khalimatus Sadiyah	21	21

Semi-finals
1	(Norway) Helle Sofie Sagøy	9	18
(Indonesia) Leani Ratri Oktila	21	21
(China) Huang Zixuan	21	21
2	(Indonesia) Khalimatus Sadiyah	14	14

Final
(Indonesia) Leani Ratri Oktila	21	19	21
(China) Huang Zixuan	9	21	14

=== Women's Singles SH6 ===
Seeds

1. (India) Nithya Sre Sivan (final)
2. (Peru) Giuliana Póveda (quarter-finals)

Round of 16
1	(India) Nithya Sre Sivan	21	21
(Poland) Oliwia Szmigiel	11	5
(Chinese Taipei) Wu Yu-yen	21	15	21
(Thailand) Chai Saeyang	10	21	19
(Indonesia) Rina Marlina	21	21
(France) Pauline Beaufour-Pelle	6	7
(United States) Jayci Simon	21	21
(Ukraine) Nina Kozlova	4	8
(Chinese Taipei) Cai Yi-lin	10	6
(China) Lin Shuangbao	21	21
(England) Anya Butterworth	26	20
(Egypt) Yasmina Eissa	28	22
(Poland) Daria Bujnicka	2	8
(China) Li Fengmei	21	21
(India) Rachana Shaileshkumar Patel	6	7
2	(Peru) Giuliana Póveda	21	21

Quarter-finals
1	(India) Nithya Sre Sivan	21	21
(Chinese Taipei) Wu Yu-yen	8	8
(Indonesia) Rina Marlina	22	21
(United States) Jayci Simon	20	15
(China) Lin Shuangbao	21	21
(Egypt) Yasmina Eissa	10	9
(China) Li Fengmei	21	21
2	(Peru) Giuliana Póveda	9	10

Semi-finals
1	(India) Nithya Sre Sivan	21	21
(Indonesia) Rina Marlina	11	11
(China) Lin Shuangbao	11	11
(China) Li Fengmei	21	21

Final
1	(India) Nithya Sre Sivan	14	21	17
(China) Li Fengmei	21	12	21

=== Women's Doubles WH1–WH2 ===
Quarter-finals
A1	(Switzerland) Cynthia Mathez (Switzerland) Ilaria Olgiati	21	21
C2	(India) Alphia James (India) Pallavi Kaluvehalli	11	13
C1	(China) Liu Yutong (China) Yin Menglu	21	21
A2	(China) Li Jiaqi (China) Xu Tingting	10	16
B2	(Brazil) Maria Gilda dos Santos Domingues Antunes (Brazil) Auricélia Nunes Evangelista	5	10
D1	(China) Fan Chaoyue (China) Li Hongyan	21	21
D2	(Peru) Jaquelin Karina Burgos Javier (Peru) Pilar Jáuregui	8	9
B1	(Thailand) Onanong Phraikaeo (Thailand) Sujirat Pookkham	21	21

Semi-finals
A1	(Switzerland) Cynthia Mathez (Switzerland) Ilaria Olgiati	4	4
C1	(China) Liu Yutong (China) Yin Menglu	21	21
D1	(China) Fan Chaoyue (China) Li Hongyan	21	21
B1	(Thailand) Onanong Phraikaeo (Thailand) Sujirat Pookkham	17	12

Final
C1	(China) Liu Yutong (China) Yin Menglu	21	21
D1	(China) Fan Chaoyue (China) Li Hongyan	14	13

=== Women's Doubles SL3–SU5 ===
Seeds

1. (India) Manasi Joshi / (India) Thulasimathi Murugesan
2. (Indonesia) Leani Ratri Oktila / (Indonesia) Khalimatus Sadiyah

Round of 16
(India) Mandeep Kaur (India) Manisha Ramadass	21	21
(Australia) Zashka Gunson (Australia) Céline Vinot	6	12
(Italy) Rosa Efomo de Marco (Bulgaria) Emona Ivanova	16	19
(Brazil) Mikaela da Costa Almeida (Brazil) Kauana Michelson Beckenkamp	21	21
(India) Sanjana Kumari (India) Shanthiya Viswanathan	15	14
(China) Gu Feifei (China) Su Kunrong	21	21
(France) Marjorie Boigeol (Norway) Helle Sofie Sagøy	21	21
(China) Huang Zixuan (China) Yuan Gaoying	10	14

Quarter-finals
1	(India) Manasi Joshi (India) Thulasimathi Murugesan	14	21	21
(India) Mandeep Kaur (India) Manisha Ramadass	21	5	6
(China) Xiao Zuxian (China) Yang Qiuxia	21	21
(Brazil) Mikaela da Costa Almeida (Brazil) Kauana Michelson Beckenkamp	8	8
(China) Gu Feifei (China) Su Kunrong	11	21	16
(China) Li Tongtong (China) Liu Yuemei	21	18	21
(France) Marjorie Boigeol (Norway) Helle Sofie Sagøy	12	16
2	(Indonesia) Leani Ratri Oktila (Indonesia) Khalimatus Sadiyah	21	21

Semi-finals
1	(India) Manasi Joshi (India) Thulasimathi Murugesan	15	21	17
(China) Xiao Zuxian (China) Yang Qiuxia	21	15	21
(China) Li Tongtong (China) Liu Yuemei	13	14
2	(Indonesia) Leani Ratri Oktila (Indonesia) Khalimatus Sadiyah	21	21

Final
(China) Xiao Zuxian (China) Yang Qiuxia	21	21
2	(Indonesia) Leani Ratri Oktila (Indonesia) Khalimatus Sadiyah	19	12

=== Women's Doubles SH6 ===
Seeds

1. (China) Li Fengmei / (China) Lin Shuangbao
2. (India) Rachana Patel / (India) Nithya Sre Sivan

=== Mixed Doubles WH1–WH2 ===
Round of 16
C2	(India) Shashank Kumar (India) Ammu Mohan	14	12
B2	(Thailand) Kittichai Rakjaingam (Thailand) Onanong Phraikaeo	21	21
F1	(India) Abu Hubaida (India) Pallavi Kaluvehalli M.	22	21
A2	(Brazil) Julio Cesar Godoy (Brazil) Daniele Torres Souza	20	18
D2	(Chinese Taipei) Ong Yu-yu (Chinese Taipei) Yang I-chen	8	10
E1	(China) Zhao Xin (China) Yin Menglu	21	21
E2	(Spain) Francisco Motero (Spain) Maya Alcaide	21	19	14
F2	(Czech Republic) Kamil Šnajdar (Germany) Annika Schröder	8	21	21

Quarter-finals
A1	(Chile) Jaime Aránguiz (Belgium) Man-Kei To	21	21
B2	(Thailand) Kittichai Rakjaingam (Thailand) Onanong Phraikaeo	19	18
D1	(India) Prem Kumar Ale (India) Alphia James	21	21
F1	(India) Abu Hubaida (India) Pallavi Kaluvehalli M.	14	17
E1	(China) Zhao Xin (China) Yin Menglu	9	16
C1	(China) Qu Zimo (China) Liu Yutong	21	21
F2	(Czech Republic) Kamil Šnajdar (Germany) Annika Schröder	7	8
B1	(South Korea) Park Hae-seong (South Korea) Jung Gyeo-ul	21	21

Semi-finals
A1	(Chile) Jaime Aránguiz (Belgium) Man-Kei To	14	15
D1	(India) Prem Kumar Ale (India) Alphia James	21	21
C1	(China) Qu Zimo (China) Liu Yutong	21	21
B1	(South Korea) Park Hae-seong (South Korea) Jung Gyeo-ul	3	7

Final
D1	(India) Prem Kumar Ale (India) Alphia James	6	4
C1	(China) Qu Zimo (China) Liu Yutong	21	21

=== Mixed Doubles SH6 ===
Seeds

1. (India) Krishna Nagar / (India) Nithya Sre Sivan (semi-finals)
2. (Hong Kong) Chu Man Kai / (Hong Kong) Choi Wing Kei (group stage)

Quarter-finals
1	(India) Krishna Nagar (India) Nithya Sre Sivan	21	21
(Canada) Justin Kendrick (Canada) Colleen Cloetta	8	16
(China) Lin Naili (China) Li Fengmei	21	17	21
(Thailand) Natthapong Meechai (Thailand) Chai Saeyang	15	21	16
(England) Jack Shephard (England) Rachel Choong	19	9
(Indonesia) Subhan (Indonesia) Rina Marlina	21	21
(Malaysia) Muhammad Amin Azmi (Malaysia) Nurzammiezatul Syafiqqah binti Mohamad Zamberi	6	7
(China) Zeng Qingtao (China) Lin Shuangbao	21	21

Semi-finals
1	(India) Krishna Nagar (India) Nithya Sre Sivan	9	21	13
(China) Lin Naili (China) Li Fengmei	21	18	21
(Indonesia) Subhan (Indonesia) Rina Marlina	12	17
(China) Zeng Qingtao (China) Lin Shuangbao	21	21

Final
(China) Lin Naili (China) Li Fengmei
(China) Zeng Qingtao (China) Lin Shuangbao
