= Nigeria at the 2024 Summer Paralympics =

- Flag of Nigeria
- IPC code: NGR
- NPC: Nigeria Paralympic Committee

in Paris, France August 28, 2024 – September 8, 2024
- Competitors: 23 in 4 sports
- Flag bearer: Lauritta Onye
- Medals Ranked 40th: Gold 2 Silver 3 Bronze 2 Total 7

Summer Paralympics appearances (overview)
- 1992; 1996; 2000; 2004; 2008; 2012; 2016; 2020; 2024

Nigeria competed at the 2024 Summer Paralympics in Paris, France, from 28 August to 8 September 2024.

== Medalists ==
Medal	Name	Sport	Event	Date
Gold	Onyinyechi Mark	Powerlifting	Women's 61 kg	6 September
Gold	Folashade Oluwafemiayo	Powerlifting	Women's + 86 kg	8 September
Silver	Esther Nworgu	Powerlifting	Women's 41 kg	4 September
Silver	Bose Omolayo	Powerlifting	Women's 79 kg	7 September
Silver	Flora Ugwunwa	Athletics	Women's javelin throw F54	7 September
Bronze	Mariam Eniola Bolaji	Badminton	Women's singles SL3	2 September
Bronze	Isau Ogunkunle	Table tennis	Men's individual Class 4	7 September

== Competitors ==
Sport	Men	Women	Total
Athletics	1	4	5
Badminton	1	1	2
Powerlifting	1	7	8
Table tennis	6	2	8
Total	9	14	23

== Athletics ==
Chinese track and field athletes achieved quota places for the following events based on their results at the 2023 World Championships, 2024 World Championships, or through high performance allocation, as long as they meet the minimum entry standard (MES).

Key

- Note–Ranks given for track events are within the athlete's heat only
- Q = Qualified for the next round
- q = Qualified for the next round as a fastest loser or, in field events, by position without achieving the qualifying target
- DQ = Disqualified
- PR = Paralympic Record
- AR = Area (or continental) Record
- NR = National Record
- SB = Season's Best
- N/A = Round not applicable for the event
- Bye = Athlete not required to compete in round

Track and road events

Athlete	Event	Heats		Final	
Athlete	Event	Time	Rank	Time	Rank
Hannah Babalola	Women's 100 metres T54	17.39	6	Did not advance	
Hannah Babalola	Women's 400 metres T54	1:01.37	7	Did not advance	

Field events

Athlete	Event	Final	
Athlete	Event	Distance	Position
Abraham Okechukwu Amon	Men's high jump T64	1.85	6
Lauritta Onye	Women's shot put F40	8.50	5
Goodness Chiemerie Nwachukwu	Women's shot put F64	11.49	4
Flora Ugwunwa	Women's javelin throw F54	19.26	2nd place, silver medalist(s)
Flora Ugwunwa	Women's shot put F54	6.72	7

== Badminton ==
Athlete	Event	Group Stage			Quarterfinal	Semifinal	Final / BM	
Athlete	Event	Opposition Score	Opposition Score	Rank	Opposition Score	Opposition Score	Opposition Score	Rank
Chigozie Jeremiah Nnanna	Men's singles SL4	Adam (GER); W (21–12, 21–15)	Setiawan (INA); L (12–21, 22–24)	2	Did not advance			
Mariam Eniola Bolaji	Women's singles SL3	Kaur (IND); W (21–8, 21–14)	Vinot (AUS); W (21–8, 21–14)	1 Q	Kaur (IND); W (21–8, 21–9)	Xiao (CHN); L (16–21, 17–21)	Kozyna (UKR); W (21–9, 21–9)	3rd place, bronze medalist(s)

== Powerlifting ==
Athlete	Event	Attempts (kg)				Result (kg)	Rank
Athlete	Event	1	2	3	4	Result (kg)	Rank
Thomas Kure	Men's 65 kg	~~202~~	205	~~212~~	—N/a	205	5
Bose Bejide	Women's 50 kg	90	100	~~118~~	—N/a	100	7
Lucy Ejike	Women's 67 kg	132	~~137~~	~~139~~	—N/a	132	4
Onyinyechi Mark	Women's 61 kg	140	145	147	150	150	1st place, gold medalist(s)
Esther Nworgu	Women's 41 kg	106	112	118	—N/a	118	2nd place, silver medalist(s)
Loveline Obiji	Women's 86 kg	NA	NA	NA	—N/a	DSQ	
Folashade Oluwafemiayo	Women's +86 kg	157	162	166	167	167	1st place, gold medalist(s)
Bose Omolayo	Women's 79 kg	145	~~151~~	~~151~~	—N/a	145	2nd place, silver medalist(s)

== Table tennis ==
Nigeria secure nine singles spot for the Paralympic games. All of them qualified for their games by virtue of their highest ranked results, in their respective class, through the 2023 African Para Championships held in Giza.

Men

Athlete	Event	Round of 32	Round of 16	Quarterfinals	Semifinals	Final / BM	
Athlete	Event	Opposition Result	Opposition Result	Opposition Result	Opposition Result	Opposition Result	Rank
Isau Ogunkunle	Individual C4	—N/a	Ozturk (TUR); W 3–1	Thomas (FRA); W 3–1	Kim (KOR); L 1–3	Did not advance	3rd place, bronze medalist(s)
Bolawa Akingbemisilu	Individual C5	—N/a	Arabian (BRA); L 2–3	Did not advance			
Kayode Alabi	Individual C6	—N/a	Simion (ROU); W 3–1	Thainiyom (THA); L 0–3	Did not advance		
Victor Farinloye	Individual C8	Zohil (CRO); L 0–3	Did not advance				
Abiola Wali Adesope	Individual C9	—N/a	Didier (FRA); L 0–3	Did not advance			
Alabi Olabiyi Olufemi	Individual C10	—N/a	Lian (CHN); L 0–3	Did not advance			
Victor Farinloye; Kayode Alabi	Men's double MD14	—N/a	Huang; Peng (CHN); L 0–3	Did not advance			

Women

Athlete	Event	Round of 16	Quarterfinals	Semifinals	Final / BM	
Athlete	Event	Opposition Result	Opposition Result	Opposition Result	Opposition Result	Rank
Ifechukwude Ikpeoyi	Individual C5	Leonelli (CHI); L 1–3	Did not advance			
Faith Obazuaye	Individual C10	Tian (TPE); L 0–3	Did not advance			

Mixed

Athlete	Event	Round of 32	Round of 16	Quarterfinals	Semifinals	Final / BM	
Athlete	Event	Opposition Result	Opposition Result	Opposition Result	Opposition Result	Opposition Result	Rank
Faith Obazuaye; Kayode Alabi	Mixed doubles XD17	Stacey; Twomey (GBR); L 1–3	Did not advance				
