= Jeremiah Nnanna =

Nigerian para-badminton player (born 2001)

Personal information
- Born: 26 November 2001 (age 24) Abia, Nigeria

Sport
- Country: Nigeria
- Sport: Badminton
- Handedness: Right

Men's singles SL4 Men's doubles SL3–SL4 Mixed doubles SL3–SU5
- Highest ranking: 12 (MS 17 September 2024); 10 (MD with Chukwuebuka Eze 11 May 2024); 20 (XD with Mariam Eniola Bolaji 11 June 2024)
- Current ranking: 12 (MS); 10 (MD with Chukwuebuka Eze); 20 (XD with Mariam Eniola Bolaji) (1 October 2024)
Medal record
Men's para-badminton
Representing Nigeria
World Championships
Bronze medal – third place	2026 Manama	Men's singles
African Championships
Gold medal – first place	2023 Kampala	Men's singles
Gold medal – first place	2023 Kampala	Men's doubles
Gold medal – first place	2023 Kampala	Mixed doubles

Chigozie Jeremiah Nnanna (born 26 November 2001) is a Nigerian para-badminton player. He represented Nigeria in the men's singles SL4 event at the 2024 Summer Paralympics.

== Achievements ==
=== World Championships ===
Men's singles SL4

Year	Venue	Opponent	Score	Result
2026	Isa Sports City, Manama, Bahrain	(India) Naveen Sivakumar	9–21, 14–21	Bronze

=== African Championships ===
Men's singles SL4

Year	Venue	Opponent	Score	Result
2023	Lugogo Indoor Stadium, Kampala, Uganda	(Uganda) Hassan Mubiru	21–14, 21–5	Gold

Men's doubles SL3–SL4

Year	Venue	Partner	Opponent	Score	Result
2023 (Note: This tournament uses a round robin system.)	Lugogo Indoor Stadium, Kampala, Uganda	(Nigeria) Chukwuebuka Eze	(Senegal) Mamadou Aidara (Togo) Séverin Ayao Kansa	21–8, 21–2	Gold
2023	Lugogo Indoor Stadium, Kampala, Uganda	(Nigeria) Chukwuebuka Eze	(Cameroon) Emmanuel Amougui (Cameroon) Étienne Songa Bidjocka	21–11, 21–7	Gold
2023	Lugogo Indoor Stadium, Kampala, Uganda	(Nigeria) Chukwuebuka Eze	(Egypt) Joun Khaled Lotfy (Uganda) Sabasi Kunya	Walkover	Gold
2023	Lugogo Indoor Stadium, Kampala, Uganda	(Nigeria) Chukwuebuka Eze	(Egypt) Walid Abdelghany Elsaied (Egypt) Mohamed Shaaban Ismail	21–4, 21–8	Gold

Mixed doubles SL3–SU5

Year	Venue	Partner	Opponent	Score	Result
2023	Lugogo Indoor Stadium, Kampala, Uganda	(Nigeria) Mariam Eniola Bolaji	(Egypt) Mohamed Shaaban Ismail (Zambia) Martha Chewe	21–8, 21–5	Gold

=== BWF Para Badminton World Circuit (1 title, 2 runners-up) ===
The BWF Para Badminton World Circuit – Grade 2, Level 1, 2 and 3 tournaments has been sanctioned by the Badminton World Federation from 2022.

Men's singles SL4

Year	Tournament	Level	Opponent	Score	Result
2024	Egypt Para-Badminton International	Level 2	(Germany) Marcel Adam	19–21, 21–13, 15–21	(silver) Runner-up

Men's doubles SL3–SL4

Year	Tournament	Level	Partner	Opponent	Score	Result
2024	Uganda Para-Badminton International	Level 3	(Nigeria) Obinna Nwosu	(India) Kartik Suhag (India) Aman Thakur	18–21, 19–21	(silver) Runner-up

Mixed doubles SL3–SU5

Year	Tournament	Level	Partner	Opponent	Score	Result
2024	Egypt Para-Badminton International	Level 2	(Nigeria) Mariam Eniola Bolaji	(India) Jagadesh Dilli (Italy) Rosa Efomo de Marco	21–7, 21–10	(gold) Winner
