= Badminton at the 2024 Summer Paralympics – Women's singles SL3 =

Badminton competition

Women's singles SL3 at the XVII Paralympic Games
- Venue: Arena Porte de La Chapelle, Paris
- Dates: 29 August 2024 – 2 September 2024
- Competitors: 10 from 9 nations

Medalists
1st place, gold medalist(s)		Xiao Zuxian	China
2nd place, silver medalist(s)		Qonitah Ikhtiar Syakuroh	Indonesia
3rd place, bronze medalist(s)		Mariam Eniola Bolaji	Nigeria

The women's singles SL3 tournament at the 2024 Summer Paralympics in France will take place between 29 August and 2 September 2024 at Arena Porte de La Chapelle.

== Classification ==
- SL3
  Players have impairment in one or both lower limbs and poor walking/running balance

== Seeds ==
These were the seeds for this event:

1. Qonitah Ikhtiar Syakuroh (INA) (final, silver medalist)
2. Halime Yıldız (TUR) (quarterfinals)
3. Mariam Eniola Bolaji (NGR) (semifinals, bronze medalist)

== Group stage ==
The draw of the group stage revealed on 24 August 2024. The group stage will be played from 29 to 31 August. The top two winners of each group advanced to the knockout rounds.

=== Group A ===
Pos	Team	Pld	W	L	GF	GA	GD	PF	PA	PD	Pts	Qualification
1	Qonitah Ikhtiar Syakuroh (INA)	2	2	0	4	1	+3	100	71	+29	2	Semi-finals
2	Oksana Kozyna (UKR)	2	1	1	2	3	−1	73	99	−26	1	Quarter-finals
3	Manasi Joshi (IND)	2	0	2	2	4	−2	109	112	−3	0	

First match(es) will be played: 29 August 2024. Source: COJOP2024

Date	Time	Player 1	Score	Player 2	Set 1	Set 2	Set 3	Report
Aug 29	10:30	Qonitah Ikhtiar Syakuroh (Indonesia)	2–1	(India) Manasi Girishchandra Joshi	16–21	21–13	21–18	
Aug 30	8:30	Manasi Joshi (India)	1–2	(Ukraine) Oksana Kozyna	21–10	15–21	21–23	
Aug 31	8:30	Qonitah Ikhtiar Syakuroh (Indonesia)	2–0	(Ukraine) Oksana Kozyna	21–5	21–14		

=== Group B ===
Pos	Team	Pld	W	L	GF	GA	GD	PF	PA	PD	Pts	Qualification
1	Mariam Eniola Bolaji (NGR)	2	2	0	4	0	+4	84	44	+40	2	Quarter-finals
2	Mandeep Kaur (IND)	2	1	1	2	3	−1	85	92	−7	1	Quarter-finals
3	Céline Vinot (AUS)	2	0	2	1	4	−3	72	105	−33	0	

First match(es) will be played: 29 August 2024. Source: COJOP2024

Date	Time	Player 1	Score	Player 2	Set 1	Set 2	Set 3	Report
Aug 29	10:30	Mariam Eniola Bolaji (Nigeria)	2–0	(India) Mandeep Kaur	21–8	21–14		Report
Aug 30	8:30	Mariam Eniola Bolaji (Nigeria)	2–0	(Australia) Céline Vinot	21–8	21–14		Report
Aug 31	8:30	Mandeep Kaur (India)	2–1	(Australia) Céline Vinot	21–23	21–10	21–17	

=== Group C ===
Pos	Team	Pld	W	L	GF	GA	GD	PF	PA	PD	Pts	Qualification
1	Xiao Zuxian (CHN)	3	3	0	6	0	+6	126	47	+79	3	Semi-finals
2	Halime Yıldız (TUR)	3	2	1	4	2	+2	103	86	+17	2	Quarter-finals
3	Darunee Henpraiwan (THA)	3	1	2	2	5	−3	112	119	−7	1	
4	Noriko Ito (JPN)	3	0	3	1	6	−5	58	147	−89	0	

First match(es) will be played: 29 August 2024. Source: COJOP2024

Date	Time	Player 1	Score	Player 2	Set 1	Set 2	Set 3	Report
Aug 29	10:30	Xiao Zuxian (China)	2–0	(Thailand) Darunee Henpraiwan	21–7	21–12		
Aug 29	11:10	Halime Yıldız (Turkey)	2–0	(Japan) Noriko Ito	21–10	21–4		
Aug 30	9:10	Noriko Ito (Japan)	0–2	(China) Xiao Zuxian	5–21	4–21		Report
Aug 30	9:10	Halime Yıldız (Turkey)	2–0	(Thailand) Darunee Henpraiwan	21–12	21–18		Report
Aug 31	9:10	Halime Yıldız (Turkey)	0–2	(China) Xiao Zuxian	9–21	10–21		
Aug 31	9:10	Noriko Ito (Japan)	1–2	(Thailand) Darunee Henpraiwan	23–21	7–21	5–21	

== Finals ==
The knockout stage will be played from 1 to 2 September.

Quarter-finals
Oksana Kozyna (UKR)	14	21	26
2	Halime Yıldız (TUR)	21	15	24
Mandeep Kaur (IND)	8	9
3	Mariam Eniola Bolaji (NGR)	21	21

Semi-finals
1	Qonitah Ikhtiar Syakuroh (INA)	21	21
Oksana Kozyna (UKR)	13	3
3	Mariam Eniola Bolaji (NGR)	16	17
Xiao Zuxian (CHN)	21	21

Gold medal match
1	Qonitah Ikhtiar Syakuroh (INA) (silver)	14	20
Xiao Zuxian (CHN) (gold)	21	22
Bronze medal match
Oksana Kozyna (UKR)	9	9
3	Mariam Eniola Bolaji (NGR) (bronze)	21	21
