= Badminton at the 2020 Summer Paralympics – Women's singles WH2 =

Women's singles WH2 at the XVI Paralympic Games
- Venue: Yoyogi National Gymnasium
- Dates: 1–4 September 2021
- Competitors: 9 from 7 nations

Medalists
1st place, gold medalist(s)		Liu Yutong	China
2nd place, silver medalist(s)		Xu Tingting	China
3rd place, bronze medalist(s)		Yuma Yamazaki	Japan

The women's singles WH2 tournament at the 2020 Summer Paralympics in Tokyo took place between 1 and 4 September 2021 at Yoyogi National Gymnasium.

== Seeds ==
These are the seeds for this event:

1. Liu Yutong (CHN) (gold medalist)
2. Xu Tingting (CHN) (silver medalist)
3. Yuma Yamazaki (JPN) (bronze medalist)

== Group stage ==
The draw of the group stage revealed on 26 August 2021. The group stage was played from 1 to 3 September. The top two winners of each group advanced to the knockout rounds.

=== Group A ===
Pos	Team	Pld	W	L	GF	GA	GD	PF	PA	PD	Pts	Qualification
1	Liu Yutong (CHN)	2	2	0	4	0	+4	84	22	+62	2	Advance to semi-finals
2	Tatiana Gureeva (RPC)	2	1	1	2	3	−1	70	85	−15	1	Advance to quarter-finals
3	Pilar Jáuregui (PER)	2	0	2	1	4	−3	57	104	−47	0	

Source: TOCOG

Date	Time	Player 1	Score	Player 2	Set 1	Set 2	Set 3
1 Sep	19:20	Liu Yutong (China)	2–0	(Russia) Tatiana Gureeva	21–3	21–5	
2 Sep	13:00	Pilar Jáuregui (Peru)	1–2	(Russia) Tatiana Gureeva	22–20	11–21	10–21
3 Sep	09:40	Liu Yutong (China)	2–0	(Peru) Pilar Jáuregui	21–5	21–9	

=== Group B ===
Pos	Team	Pld	W	L	GF	GA	GD	PF	PA	PD	Pts	Qualification
1	Emine Seçkin (TUR)	2	2	0	4	2	+2	109	98	+11	2	Advance to quarter-finals
2	Yuma Yamazaki (JPN)	2	1	1	3	2	+1	95	91	+4	1	Advance to quarter-finals
3	Lee Sun-ae (KOR)	2	0	2	1	4	−3	82	97	−15	0	

Source: TOCOG

Date	Time	Player 1	Score	Player 2	Set 1	Set 2	Set 3
1 Sep	19:20	Yuma Yamazaki (Japan)	2–0	(South Korea) Lee Sun-ae	22–20	21–16	
2 Sep	13:00	Emine Seçkin (Turkey)	2–1	(South Korea) Lee Sun-ae	12–21	21–9	21–16
3 Sep	10:20	Yuma Yamazaki (Japan)	1–2	(Turkey) Emine Seçkin	15–21	21–13	16–21

=== Group C ===
Pos	Team	Pld	W	L	GF	GA	GD	PF	PA	PD	Pts	Qualification
1	Xu Tingting (CHN)	2	2	0	4	0	+4	84	33	+51	2	Advance to semi-finals
2	Amnouy Wetwithan (THA)	2	1	1	2	0	+2	61	73	−12	1	Advance to quarter-finals
3	Rie Ogura (JPN) (H)	2	0	2	0	4	−4	45	84	−39	0	

Source: TOCOG
(H) Host

Date	Time	Player 1	Score	Player 2	Set 1	Set 2	Set 3
1 Sep	20:00	Xu Tingting (China)	2–0	(Japan) Rie Ogura	21–6	21–8	
2 Sep	13:40	Amnouy Wetwithan (Thailand)	2–0	(Japan) Rie Ogura	21–14	21–17	
3 Sep	09:40	Xu Tingting (China)	2–0	(Thailand) Amnouy Wetwithan	21–16	21–3	

== Finals ==
The knockout stage was played from 3 to 4 September.

Quarter-finals
B1	Emine Seçkin (TUR)	21	21
C2	Amnouy Wetwithan (THA)	10	15
B2	Yuma Yamazaki (JPN)	23	21	21
A2	Tatiana Gureeva (RPC)	25	7	8

Semi-finals
A1	Liu Yutong (CHN)	21	21
B1	Emine Seçkin (TUR)	7	4
B2	Yuma Yamazaki (JPN)	12	13
C1	Xu Tingting (CHN)	21	21

Gold medal match
A1	Liu Yutong (CHN) (gold)	21	21
C1	Xu Tingting (CHN) (silver)	15	15
Bronze medal match
B1	Emine Seçkin (TUR)	16	8
B2	Yuma Yamazaki (JPN) (bronze)	21	21
