= 2026 in badminton =

This article lists the badminton events happening in the year 2026. The major international events are the 2026 BWF Para-Badminton World Championships in Manama, Bahrain and the 2026 Thomas & Uber Cup in Horsens, Denmark.

== BWF World Tour ==
=== Super 1000 events ===
==== 2026 Malaysia Open ====
- Men's singles - (gold) (Thailand) Kunlavut Vitidsarn; (silver) (China) Shi Yuqi
- Women's singles - (gold) (South Korea) An Se-young; (silver) (China) Wang Zhiyi
- Men's doubles - (gold) (South Korea) Kim Won-ho / Seo Seung-jae; (silver) (Malaysia) Aaron Chia / Soh Wooi Yik
- Women's doubles - (gold) (China) Liu Shengshu / Tan Ning; (silver) (South Korea) Baek Ha-na / Lee So-hee
- Mixed doubles - (gold) (China) Feng Yanzhe / Huang Dongping; (silver) (China) Jiang Zhenbang / Wei Yaxin
