= Badminton at the 2022 Asian Para Games – Women's singles SL3 =

Badminton's women's singles SL3 at the 2022 Asian Para Games
- Venue: Binjiang Gymnasium, Hangzhou
- Dates: 20 – 26 August 2023
- Competitors: 9 from 6 nations

Medalists
gold medal	Xiao Zuxian	China
silver medal	Qonitah Ikhtiar Syakuroh	Indonesia
bronze medal	Manasi Girishchandra Joshi	India
bronze medal	Mandeep Kaur	India

The women's singles SL3 badminton tournament at the 2022 Asian Para Games is playing from 20 to 26 October 2023 in Binjiang Gymnasium, Hangzhou. A total of 9 players competed at the tournament, three of whom was seeded.

== Competition schedule ==
Plays are taking place between 20 and 26 October 2023.

GS	Group stage	¼	Quarterfinals	½	Semifinals	F	Final

Events	Fri 20	Sat 21	Sun 22	Mon 23	Tue 24	Wed 25	Thu 26	Fri 27
Women's singles SL3	GS	GS		GS	¼	½	F	

== Seeds ==
The following players were seeded:

1. Qonitah Ikhtiar Syakuroh (INA) (final; silver medalist)
2. Mandeep Kaur (IND) (semi-finals; bronze medalist)
3. Manasi Girishchandra Joshi (IND) (semi-finals; bronze medalist)

== Group stage ==
=== Group A ===
Pos	Team	Pld	W	L	GF	GA	GD	PF	PA	PD	Qualification
1	Qonitah Ikhtiar Syakuroh (INA) [1]	2	2	0	4	0	+4	84	35	+49	Qualification to elimination stage
2	Liu Yuemei (CHN) (H)	2	1	1	2	2	0	58	72	−14	Qualification to elimination stage
3	Parul Parmar (IND)	2	0	2	0	4	−4	49	84	−35	

Source: Group A – standings
(H) Host

Date		Score		Game 1	Game 2	Game 3
20 Oct	Liu Yuemei (China)	2–0	(India) Parul Parmar	21–17	21–13	
21 Oct	Qonitah Ikhtiar Syakuroh (Indonesia)	2–0	(China) Liu Yuemei	21–6	21–10	
23 Oct	Qonitah Ikhtiar Syakuroh (Indonesia)	2–0	(India) Parul Parmar	21–8	21–11	

=== Group B ===
Pos	Team	Pld	W	L	GF	GA	GD	PF	PA	PD	Qualification
1	Mandeep Kaur (IND) [2]	2	2	0	4	0	+4	84	8	+76	Qualification to elimination stage
2	Altaf Matar (SYR)	2	1	1	2	2	0	45	64	−19	Qualification to elimination stage
3	Shabnam Mekanboeva (TJK)	2	0	2	0	4	−4	27	84	−57	

Source: Group B – standings

Date		Score		Game 1	Game 2	Game 3
20 Oct	Shabnam Mekanboeva (Tajikistan)	0–2	(Syria) Altaf Matar	10–21	12–21	
21 Oct	Mandeep Kaur (India)	2–0	(Syria) Altaf Matar	21–1	21–2	
23 Oct	Mandeep Kaur (India)	2–0	(Tajikistan) Shabnam Mekanboeva	21–2	21–3	

=== Group C ===
Pos	Team	Pld	W	L	GF	GA	GD	PF	PA	PD	Qualification
1	Xiao Zuxian (CHN) (H)	2	2	0	4	0	+4	84	59	+25	Qualification to elimination stage
2	Manasi Girishchandra Joshi (IND) [3]	2	1	1	2	2	0	67	71	−4	Qualification to elimination stage
3	Darunee Henpraiwan (THA)	2	0	2	0	4	−4	63	84	−21	

Source: Group C – standings
(H) Host

Date		Score		Game 1	Game 2	Game 3
20 Oct	Xiao Zuxian (China)	2–0	(Thailand) Darunee Henpraiwan	21–15	21–19	
21 Oct	Manasi Girishchandra Joshi (India)	0–2	(China) Xiao Zuxian	11–21	15–21	
23 Oct	Manasi Girishchandra Joshi (India)	2–0	(Thailand) Darunee Henpraiwan	21–13	21–16	

== Elimination round ==
Top two ranked in each group qualified to the elimination round, the draw was decided after the previous round finished.

Quarter-finals
3	Manasi Girishchandra Joshi (IND)	17	21	21
Liu Yuemei (CHN)	21	17	18
Altaf Matar (SYR)	4	4
Xiao Zuxian (CHN)	21	21

Semi-finals
1	Qonitah Ikhtiar Syakuroh (INA)	21	21
3	Manasi Girishchandra Joshi (IND)	10	14
Xiao Zuxian (CHN)	21	21
2	Mandeep Kaur (IND)	11	14

Final
1	Qonitah Ikhtiar Syakuroh (INA)	21	8	14
Xiao Zuxian (CHN)	13	21	21
