= 2026 BWF Para-Badminton World Championships – Women's Singles WH1 =

Women's Singles WH1 at 2026 BWF Para-Badminton World Championships
Tournament details
- Dates: 8–13 February 2026
- Competitors: 24 from 14 nations
- Venue: Isa Sports City, Manama

The women's singles WH1 tournament at the 2026 BWF Para-Badminton World Championships took place from 8 to 13 February 2026 at Isa Sports City in Manama. A total of 24 players from 14 nations competed at the tournament.

== Classification ==
- WH1
  Players in this class are those who have impairment in both lower limbs and trunk function and require wheelchair to play

== Format ==
The 24 players were split into 8 groups of three players. They played a round-robin tournament with the top 2 players advancing to the knockout stage. Each match was played in a best-of-3.

== Seeds ==
These were the seeds for this event:

1. (Japan) Sarina Satomi (champion)
2. (Belgium) Man-Kei To (quarter-finals)

== Group stage ==
=== Group A ===
Pos	Team	Pld	W	L	GF	GA	GD	PF	PA	PD	Pts	Qualification
1	Sarina Satomi (JPN)	2	2	0	4	0	+4	84	10	+74	2	Knockout stage
2	Bree Wright (AUS)	2	1	1	2	2	0	50	59	−9	1	Knockout stage
3	Rooba Al-Omari (BHR)	2	0	2	0	4	−4	19	84	−65	0	

Source: BWFBadminton.com

Date	Time	Player 1	Score	Player 2	Set 1	Set 2	Set 3
8 February	10:30	Bree Wright (Australia)	2–0	(Bahrain) Rooba Al-Omari	21–8	21–9	
8 February	15:30	Sarina Satomi (Japan)	2–0	(Australia) Bree Wright	21–4	21–4	
9 February	13:00	Sarina Satomi (Japan)	2–0	(Bahrain) Rooba Al-Omari	21–1	21–1	

=== Group B ===
Pos	Team	Pld	W	L	GF	GA	GD	PF	PA	PD	Pts	Qualification
1	Onanong Phraikaeo (THA)	2	2	0	4	0	+4	84	46	+38	2	Knockout stage
2	Man-Kei To (BEL)	2	1	1	2	2	0	72	57	+15	1	Knockout stage
3	Natalia Grzyb (POL)	2	0	2	0	4	−4	31	84	−53	0	

Source: BWFBadminton.com

Date	Time	Player 1	Score	Player 2	Set 1	Set 2	Set 3
8 February	10:30	Natalia Grzyb (Poland)	0–2	(Thailand) Onanong Phraikaeo	5–21	11–21	
8 February	15:30	Man-Kei To (Belgium)	2–0	(Poland) Natalia Grzyb	21–8	21–7	
9 February	13:00	Man-Kei To (Belgium)	0–2	(Thailand) Onanong Phraikaeo	14–21	16–21	

=== Group C ===
Pos	Team	Pld	W	L	GF	GA	GD	PF	PA	PD	Pts	Qualification
1	Cynthia Mathez (SUI)	2	2	0	4	0	+4	84	27	+57	2	Knockout stage
2	Daniele Torres Souza (BRA)	2	1	1	2	3	−1	65	86	−21	1	Knockout stage
3	Anna Wolny (POL)	2	0	2	1	4	−3	58	94	−36	0	

Source: BWFBadminton.com

Date	Time	Player 1	Score	Player 2	Set 1	Set 2	Set 3
8 February	10:30	Anna Wolny (Poland)	1–2	(Brazil) Daniele Torres Souza	21–10	10–21	13–21
8 February	15:30	Cynthia Mathez (Switzerland)	2–0	(Poland) Anna Wolny	21–12	21–2	
9 February	13:00	Cynthia Mathez (Switzerland)	2–0	(Brazil) Daniele Torres Souza	21–6	21–7	

=== Group D ===
Pos	Team	Pld	W	L	GF	GA	GD	PF	PA	PD	Pts	Qualification
1	Sena Tomoyose (JPN)	2	2	0	4	0	+4	84	23	+61	2	Knockout stage
2	Auricélia Nunes Evangelista (BRA)	2	1	1	2	2	0	53	67	−14	1	Knockout stage
3	Heidi Manninen (FIN)	2	0	2	0	4	−4	37	84	−47	0	

Source: BWFBadminton.com

Date	Time	Player 1	Score	Player 2	Set 1	Set 2	Set 3
8 February	13:00	Auricélia Nunes Evangelista (Brazil)	2–0	(Finland) Heidi Manninen	21–17	21–8	
8 February	16:00	Sena Tomoyose (Japan)	2–0	(Brazil) Auricélia Nunes Evangelista	21–4	21–7	
9 February	13:30	Sena Tomoyose (Japan)	2–0	(Finland) Heidi Manninen	21–6	21–6	

=== Group E ===
Pos	Team	Pld	W	L	GF	GA	GD	PF	PA	PD	Pts	Qualification
1	Hu Guang-chiou (TPE)	2	2	0	4	1	+3	103	68	+35	2	Knockout stage
2	Li Jiaqi (CHN)	2	1	1	3	2	+1	101	66	+35	1	Knockout stage
3	Prema Vishwas (IND)	2	0	2	0	4	−4	14	84	−70	0	

Source: BWFBadminton.com

Date	Time	Player 1	Score	Player 2	Set 1	Set 2	Set 3
8 February	11:00	Li Jiaqi (China)	2–0	(India) Prema Vishwas	21–1	21–4	
8 February	16:00	Hu Guang-chiou (Chinese Taipei)	2–1	(China) Li Jiaqi	18–21	22–20	21–18
9 February	13:30	Hu Guang-chiou (Chinese Taipei)	2–0	(India) Prema Vishwas	21–5	21–4	

=== Group F ===
Pos	Team	Pld	W	L	GF	GA	GD	PF	PA	PD	Pts	Qualification
1	Sujirat Pookkham (THA)	2	2	0	4	0	+4	84	31	+53	2	Knockout stage
2	Ana Gomes (BRA)	2	1	1	2	2	0	58	74	−16	1	Knockout stage
3	Pallavi Kaluvehalli M. (IND)	2	0	2	0	4	−4	47	84	−37	0	

Source: BWFBadminton.com

Date	Time	Player 1	Score	Player 2	Set 1	Set 2	Set 3
8 February	11:00	Pallavi Kaluvehalli M. (India)	0–2	(Thailand) Sujirat Pookkham	9–21	6–21	
8 February	16:00	Ana Gomes (Brazil)	2–0	(India) Pallavi Kaluvehalli M.	21–13	21–19	
9 February	13:30	Ana Gomes (Brazil)	0–2	(Thailand) Sujirat Pookkham	7–21	9–21	

=== Group G ===
Pos	Team	Pld	W	L	GF	GA	GD	PF	PA	PD	Pts	Qualification
1	Fan Chaoyue (CHN)	2	2	0	4	0	+4	84	33	+51	2	Knockout stage
2	Jaquelin Karina Burgos Javier (PER)	2	1	1	2	2	0	61	47	+14	1	Knockout stage
3	Annah Syombua Nzioki (KEN)	2	0	2	0	4	−4	19	84	−65	0	

Source: BWFBadminton.com

Date	Time	Player 1	Score	Player 2	Set 1	Set 2	Set 3
8 February	13:30	Annah Syombua Nzioki (Kenya)	0–2	(China) Fan Chaoyue	5–21	9–21	
8 February	16:00	Jaquelin Karina Burgos Javier (Peru)	2–0	(Kenya) Annah Syombua Nzioki	21–2	21–3	
9 February	13:30	Jaquelin Karina Burgos Javier (Peru)	0–2	(China) Fan Chaoyue	9–21	10–21	

=== Group H ===
Pos	Team	Pld	W	L	GF	GA	GD	PF	PA	PD	Pts	Qualification
1	Yin Menglu (CHN)	2	2	0	4	0	+4	84	23	+61	2	Knockout stage
2	Macka Mackenzie (AUS)	2	1	1	2	2	0	57	54	+3	1	Knockout stage
3	Nirmala Devi (IND)	2	0	2	0	4	−4	20	84	−64	0	

Source: BWFBadminton.com

Date	Time	Player 1	Score	Player 2	Set 1	Set 2	Set 3
8 February	11:00	Macka Mackenzie (Australia)	2–0	(India) Nirmala Devi	21–7	21–5	
8 February	16:00	Yin Menglu (China)	2–0	(Australia) Macka Mackenzie	21–11	21–4	
9 February	14:00	Yin Menglu (China)	2–0	(India) Nirmala Devi	21–3	21–5	

== Knockout stage ==
Round of 16
A1	(Japan) Sarina Satomi	21	21
G2	(Peru) Jaquelin Karina Burgos Javier	3	1
G1	(China) Fan Chaoyue	21	21
D2	(Brazil) Auricélia Nunes Evangelista	11	11
D1	(Japan) Sena Tomoyose	21	21
F2	(Brazil) Ana Gomes	5	11
E1	(Chinese Taipei) Hu Guang-chiou	21	21
H2	(Australia) Macka Mackenzie	5	4
A2	(Australia) Bree Wright	2	8
H1	(China) Yin Menglu	21	21
B2	(Belgium) Man-Kei To	21	14	21
C1	(Switzerland) Cynthia Mathez	15	21	19
E2	(China) Li Jiaqi	6	3
F1	(Thailand) Sujirat Pookkham	21	21
C2	(Brazil) Daniele Torres Souza	5	7
B1	(Thailand) Onanong Phraikaeo	21	21

Quarter-finals
A1	(Japan) Sarina Satomi	21	21
G1	(China) Fan Chaoyue	13	13
D1	(Japan) Sena Tomoyose	21	21
E1	(Chinese Taipei) Hu Guang-chiou	8	8
H1	(China) Yin Menglu	21	21
B2	(Belgium) Man-Kei To	19	17
F1	(Thailand) Sujirat Pookkham	21	21
B1	(Thailand) Onanong Phraikaeo	13	7

Semi-finals
A1	(Japan) Sarina Satomi	21	21
D1	(Japan) Sena Tomoyose	15	17
H1	(China) Yin Menglu	21	19	21
F1	(Thailand) Sujirat Pookkham	10	21	15

Final
A1	(Japan) Sarina Satomi	17	21	21
H1	(China) Yin Menglu	21	13	16
