= Xu Tingting =

Chinese para badminton player (born 1990)

Xu Tingting 徐婷婷
Personal information
- Born: 11 January 1990 (age 36) Shandong, China
- Height: 163 cm (5 ft 4 in)
- Weight: 47 kg (104 lb)

Sport
- Sport: Badminton
- Coached by: Qu Fuchun

Women's singles WH2 Women's doubles WH1–WH2
- Highest ranking: 2 (WS 6 April 2019); 4 (WD with Zhang Jing 7 April 2019)
- Current ranking: 11 (WS); 10 (WD with Zhang Jing) (8 November 2022)
Medal record
Women's para badminton
Representing China
Paralympic Games
Silver medal – second place	2020 Tokyo	Women's singles
World Championships
Silver medal – second place	2017 Ulsan	Women's singles
Silver medal – second place	2026 Manama	Women's singles
Bronze medal – third place	2019 Basel	Women's singles
Asian Para Games
Gold medal – first place	2018 Jakarta	Women's doubles
Silver medal – second place	2018 Jakarta	Women's singles

Xu Tingting (born 11 January 1990) is a Chinese para badminton player. She participated at the 2020 Summer Paralympics in the badminton competition, being awarded the silver medal in the women's singles WH2 event. Tingting was also a player of wheelchair basketball. According to the International Paralympic Committee, the article stated that Tingting was "very strong".

== Achievements ==
=== Paralympic Games ===
Women's singles

Year	Venue	Opponent	Score	Result
2020	Yoyogi National Gymnasium, Tokyo, Japan	(China) Liu Yutong	15–21, 15–21	Silver

=== World Championships ===
Women's singles
Year	Venue	Opponent	Score	Result
2017	Dongchun Gymnasium, Ulsan, South Korea	(China) Liu Yutong	8–21, 11–21	Silver
2019	St. Jakobshalle; Basel, Switzerland	(China) Liu Yutong	12–21, 11–21	Bronze

=== Asian Para Games ===
Women's singles
Year	Venue	Opponent	Score	Result
2018	Istora Gelora Bung Karno; Jakarta, Indonesia	(China) Liu Yutong	20–22, 16–21	Silver

Women's doubles
Year	Venue	Partner	Opponent	Score	Result
2018	Istora Gelora Bung Karno; Jakarta, Indonesia	(China) Li Hongyan	(Thailand) Sujirat Pookkham (Thailand) Amnouy Wetwithan	21–17, 11–21, 21–13	Silver

=== International Tournaments (1 title, 5 runners-up) ===
Women's singles

Year	Tournament	Opponent	Score	Result
2019	Turkish Para Badminton International	(China) Liu Yutong	17–21, 15–21	(silver) Runner-up
2019 (Note: This tournament uses a round robin system.)	China Para Badminton International	(China) Liu Yutong	16–21, 11–21	(silver) Runner-up
2019	China Para Badminton International	(China) Li Hongyan	21–15, 21–15	(silver) Runner-up
2019	China Para Badminton International	(Thailand) Amnouy Wetwithan	21–6, 21–18	(silver) Runner-up
2019	China Para Badminton International	(Spain) Marcela Quinteros	21–8, 21–7	(silver) Runner-up
2019	Japan Para Badminton International	(China) Liu Yutong	15–21, 15–21	(silver) Runner-up
2020	Brazil Para Badminton International	(China) Liu Yutong	16–21, 15–21	(silver) Runner-up

Women's doubles
Year	Tournament	Partner	Opponent	Score	Result
2019	Turkish Para Badminton International	(China) Zhang Jing	(China) Liu Yutong (China) Yin Menglu	21–18, 21–16	(gold) Winner
2019	Dubai Para Badminton International	(China) Zhang Jing	(Japan) Sarina Satomi (Japan) Yuma Yamazaki	15–21, 13–21	(silver) Runner-up
