= Pallavi Kaluvehalli =

Indian para badminton player

Pallavi Kaluvehalli (born 7 December 1993) is an Indian para-badminton player from Karnataka. She won a bronze medal at the 2026 Asian Para Games in the women's badminton partnering Alphia James, in the doubles WH1-2 class. It was India's first-ever international para badminton medal.

== Career ==
Pallavi won a bronze medal in the badminton doubles WH1-2 class, along with Alphia James at the 2026 Asian Para Games.
