= Céline Vinot =

Australian para-badminton player

Personal information
- Country: Australia
- Born: 16 December 1996 (age 28)

Céline Aurelie Vinot (born 16 December 1996) is an Australian para-badminton player. She competed at the 2024 Summer Paralympics.

== Personal ==
Céline Vinot was born on 16 December 1996 with cerebral palsy. She has a French father and an Australian mother. She has undertaken a Bachelor of Exercise Science and Business Administration at the Australian Catholic University. She accomplished chorist and French horn player.

== Badminton ==
Céline Vinot is classified as SL3 player as she has cerebral palsy. In 2014, she took up para-badminton and in 2017 competed at the international level. She has won medals at the Oceania Para-Badminton Championships. At the 2024 BWF Para Badminton World Championships, she advanced to the Women's Singles SL3 Quarterfinals In 2024, she is ranked 8th in Women's SL3 world singles rankings. At the 2024 Summer Paralympics, she lost two matches in the Women's singles SL3.

In 2024, she trains at the Altona Badminton Centre and has a Victorian Institute of Sport scholarship.
