= Xiao Zuxian =

Chinese para badminton player

Personal information
- Born: 30 April 1996 (age 30)

Sport
- Country: China
- Sport: Badminton
Medal record
Women's para-badminton
Representing China
Paralympic Games
Gold medal – first place	2024 Paris	Singles SL3
World Championships
Gold medal – first place	2024 Pattaya	Women's singles
Gold medal – first place	2026 Manama	Women's doubles
Bronze medal – third place	2024 Pattaya	Women's doubles
Bronze medal – third place	2026 Manama	Women's singles
Bronze medal – third place	2026 Manama	Mixed doubles
Asian Para Games
Gold medal – first place	2022 Hangzhou	Women's singles
Bronze medal – third place	2018 Jakarta	Women's doubles
Bronze medal – third place	2022 Hangzhou	Women's doubles

Xiao Zuxian (born 30 April 1996) is a Chinese para-badminton player. She competed at the 2024 Summer Paralympics, where she won a gold medal in the women's singles SL3 event.
