= Sanjana Kumari =

Indian para badminton player (born 2003)

Personal information
- Nationality: Indian
- Born: 17 February 2003 (age 23) Lohardaga, Jharkhand, India

Sport
- Sport: Para-badminton
- Events: Women's singles SL3; Women's & Mixed doubles SL3-SU5
- Coached by: Gaurav Khanna
Medal record
Women's para badminton
Representing India
Asian Para Games
Bronze medal – third place	2026 Aichi-Nagoya	Singles SL3
Asian Youth Para Games
Gold medal – first place	2021 Manama	Singles SL3
Gold medal – first place	2021 Manama	Doubles SL3–SU5
Gold medal – first place	2021 Manama	Mixed doubles SL3–SU5

Sanjana Kumari (born 17 February 2003) is an Indian para-badminton player. She won the bronze medal in the women's singles SL3 event at the 2026 Asian Para Games.

== Early life and education ==
Kumari was born on 17 February 2003 in Shantinagar, Lohardaga, Jharkhand. Her father, Ratan Kumar Verma, is a retired Indian Army officer who supported her daughter despite financial hardships. She trained at the badminton centre in Lucknow under coach Gaurav Khanna. She is studying MBA at Dr. Shakuntala Misra National Rehabilitation University in Lucknow, Uttar Pradesh.

== Career ==
Kumari competed at the 2026 Asian Para Games, where she won the bronze medal in the women's singles SL3 class, losing 7-21, 9-21 to Japan's Shino Kawai in the semifinal.

In December 2021, Kumari won three gold medals at the 2021 Asian Youth Para Games in Manama, Bahrain. She clinched the women's singles gold in the SL3 class and later paired with Palak to win the women's doubles SL3-SU5. She also won the mixed doubles event, partnering with Hardik Makkar in the SL3-SU5 class.
