= Pilar Jáuregui =

Peruvian para badminton player (born 1988)

Personal information
- Nickname: Peru
- Born: Pilar Jáuregui Cancino; 24 June 1988 (age 38) Puno, Peru
- Height: 166 cm (5 ft 5 in)
- Weight: 75 kg (165 lb)

Sport
- Sport: Badminton

Women's singles WH2 Women's doubles WH1–WH2 Mixed doubles WH1–WH2
- Highest ranking: 2 (WS 25 April 2022); 8 (WD with Yuka Chokyu 8 November 2022); 1 (XD with Yuri Ferrigno 8 November 2022)
- Current ranking: 3 (WS); 8 (WD with Yuka Chokyu); 1 (XD with Yuri Ferrigno) (8 November 2022)
Medal record
Para badminton
Representing Peru
World Championships
Gold medal – first place	2022 Tokyo	Women's singles
Silver medal – second place	2022 Tokyo	Mixed doubles
Silver medal – second place	2024 Pattaya	Women's singles
Bronze medal – third place	2024 Pattaya	Mixed doubles
Bronze medal – third place	2026 Manama	Women's singles
Parapan American Games
Gold medal – first place	2019 Lima	Women's singles
Gold medal – first place	2023 Santiago	Women's singles
Gold medal – first place	2023 Santiago	Women's doubles
Pan Am Championships
Gold medal – first place	2016 Medellín	Women's singles
Gold medal – first place	2018 Lima	Women's singles
Gold medal – first place	2018 Lima	Women's doubles
Gold medal – first place	2018 Lima	Mixed doubles
Gold medal – first place	2022 Cali	Women's singles
Gold medal – first place	2022 Cali	Women's doubles
Gold medal – first place	2022 Cali	Mixed doubles
Bronze medal – third place	2016 Medellín	Mixed doubles

Pilar Jáuregui Cancino (born 24 June 1988) is a Peruvian para badminton player in international elite competitions. She was a Parapan American Games champion and has been selected to compete at the 2020 Summer Paralympics as her sport makes its debut. She was a former wheelchair basketball player who competed at the 2015 Parapan American Games.

== Achievements ==
=== World Championships ===
Women's singles
Year	Venue	Opponent	Score	Result
2022	Yoyogi National Gymnasium; Tokyo, Japan	(Turkey) Emine Seçkin	21–18, 20–22, 21–17	Gold
2024	Pattaya Exhibition and Convention Hall; Pattaya, Thailand	(China) Liu Yutong	8–21, 4–21	Silver

Mixed doubles
Year	Venue	Partner	Opponent	Score	Result
2022	Yoyogi National Gymnasium; Tokyo, Japan	(Italy) Yuri Ferrigno	(South Korea) Choi Jung-man (South Korea) Lee Sun-ae	17–21, 12–21	Silver
2024	Pattaya Exhibition and Convention Hall; Pattaya, Thailand	(Italy) Yuri Ferrigno	(China) Qu Zimo (China) Liu Yutong	9–21, 6–21	Bronze

=== Parapan American Games ===
Women's singles
Year	Venue	Opponent	Score	Result
2019	National Sport Village; Lima, Peru	(Canada) Yuka Chokyu	21–12, 21–1	Gold

=== Pan Am Championships ===
Women's singles

Year	Venue	Opponent	Score	Result
2016 (Note: This tournament uses a round robin system.)	Coliseo Municipal de Envigado, Medellín, Colombia	(Brazil) Maria Gilda	21–7, 21–8	Gold
2016	Coliseo Municipal de Envigado, Medellín, Colombia	(Brazil) Daniele Torres	21–17, 21–17	Gold
2016	Coliseo Municipal de Envigado, Medellín, Colombia	(Chile) Catalina Jimeno	21–1, 21–3	Gold
2018	Polideportivo 2, Lima, Peru	(Canada) Yuka Chokyu	21–9, 21–9	Gold
2022	Coliseo Alberto León Betancourt, Cali, Colombia	(Brazil) Maria Gilda	21–11, 21–7	Gold

Women's doubles

Year	Venue	Partner	Opponent	Score	Result
2018 (Note: This tournament uses a round robin system.)	Polideportivo 2, Lima, Peru	(Canada) Yuka Chokyu	(United States) Amy Burnett (Peru) Susy Julca	21–3, 21–0	Gold
2018	Polideportivo 2, Lima, Peru	(Canada) Yuka Chokyu	(Brazil) Aline de Oliveira Cabral (Brazil) Daniele Torres	21–7, 21–10	Gold
2018	Polideportivo 2, Lima, Peru	(Canada) Yuka Chokyu	(Brazil) Auricélia Evangelista (Brazil) Maria Gilda	21–11, 21–7	Gold
2018	Polideportivo 2, Lima, Peru	(Canada) Yuka Chokyu	(Peru) Jaqueline Burgos (Chile) Catalina Jimeno	21–5, 21–3	Gold
2022 (Note: This tournament uses a round robin system.)	Coliseo Alberto León Betancourt, Cali, Colombia	(Peru) Jaqueline Karina	(United States) Amy Burnett (Chile) Daniela Zapata	21–5, 21–7	Gold
2022	Coliseo Alberto León Betancourt, Cali, Colombia	(Peru) Jaqueline Karina	(Brazil) Ana Gomes (Brazil) Daniele Torres	21–19, 21–11	Gold
2022	Coliseo Alberto León Betancourt, Cali, Colombia	(Peru) Jaqueline Karina	(Brazil) Auricélia Evangelista (Brazil) Maria Gilda	21–18, 21–19	Gold

Mixed doubles

Year	Venue	Partner	Opponent	Score	Result
2016 (Note: This tournament uses a round robin system.)	Coliseo Municipal de Envigado, Medellín, Colombia	(Peru) Ronald Miranda	(Chile) Jaime Aranguiz (Chile) Catalina Jimeno	21–14, 21–8	Bronze
2016	Coliseo Municipal de Envigado, Medellín, Colombia	(Peru) Ronald Miranda	(Brazil) Rômulo Junio Soares (Brazil) Daniele Torres	23–21, 8–21, 20–22	Bronze
2016	Coliseo Municipal de Envigado, Medellín, Colombia	(Peru) Ronald Miranda	(Brazil) Marcelo Alves (Brazil) Maria Gilda	12–21, 16–21	Bronze
2018	Polideportivo 2, Lima, Peru	(Brazil) Rodolfo Cano	(Brazil) Marcelo Alves (Brazil) Daniele Torres	21–8, 21–10	Gold
2022	Coliseo Alberto León Betancourt, Cali, Colombia	(Brazil) Rodolfo Cano	(Brazil) José Ambrosio (Brazil) Auricélia Evangelista	21–12, 21–6	Gold

=== BWF Para Badminton World Circuit (10 titles, 3 runners-up) ===
The BWF Para Badminton World Circuit – Grade 2, Level 1, 2 and 3 tournaments has been sanctioned by the Badminton World Federation from 2022.

Women's singles

Year	Tournament	Level	Opponent	Score	Result
2022	Spanish Para-Badminton International II	Level 2	(Switzerland) Ilaria Renggli	Walkover	(silver) Runner-up
2022 (Note: This tournament uses a round robin system.)	Brazil Para-Badminton International	Level 2	(India) Ammu Mohan	21–10, 21–4	(gold) Winner
2022	Brazil Para-Badminton International	Level 2	(Brazil) Aline De Oliveira Cabral	21–5, 21–14	(gold) Winner
2022	Brazil Para-Badminton International	Level 2	(Brazil) Maria Gilda Dos Santos Do Antunes	21–9, 21–10	(gold) Winner
2022	Peru Para-Badminton International	Level 2	(Brazil) Maria Gilda Dos Santos Do Antunes	21–2, 21–2	(gold) Winner
2023	Spanish Para-Badminton International	Level 2	(Japan) Yuma Yamazaki	21–15, 21–19	(gold) Winner
2023	Spanish Para-Badminton International	Level 1	(Japan) Yuma Yamazaki	15–21, 21–16, 12–21	(silver) Runner-up
2023	Brazil Para-Badminton International	Level 2	(Switzerland) Ilaria Renggli	21–19, 21–13	(gold) Winner

Women's doubles

Year	Tournament	Level	Partner	Opponent	Score	Result
2022 (Note: This tournament uses a round robin system.)	Brazil Para-Badminton International	Level 2	(Peru) Silvia Silva Arizapana	(Brazil) Maria Gilda Dos Santos Do Antunes (Brazil) Auricélia Nunes Evangelista	21–8, 14–21, 21–14	(gold) Winner
2022	Brazil Para-Badminton International	Level 2	(Peru) Silvia Silva Arizapana	(India) Ammu Mohan (Brazil) Andreia Cristina Santa Rosa Farias	21–3, 21–5	(gold) Winner
2022	Brazil Para-Badminton International	Level 2	(Peru) Silvia Silva Arizapana	(Brazil) Aline De Oliveira Cabral (Brazil) Milani Maria Silva Gomes	21–17, 21–16	(gold) Winner
2022	Brazil Para-Badminton International	Level 2	(Peru) Silvia Silva Arizapana	(Brazil) Ana Gomes (Brazil) Daniele Torres Souza	21–12, 21–11	(gold) Winner
2022 (Note: This tournament uses a round robin system.)	Peru Para-Badminton International	Level 2	(Peru) Jaqueline Karina Burgos Javier	(United States) Amy Burnett (Brazil) Aline De Oliveira Cabral	21–11, 21–6	(gold) Winner
2022	Peru Para-Badminton International	Level 2	(Peru) Jaqueline Karina Burgos Javier	(Brazil) Maria Gilda Dos Santos Do Antunes (Brazil) Auricélia Nunes Evangelista	21–11, 21–10	(gold) Winner
2022	Peru Para-Badminton International	Level 2	(Peru) Jaqueline Karina Burgos Javier	(Brazil) Ana Gomes (Brazil) Daniele Torres Souza	21–8, 21–15	(gold) Winner

Mixed doubles
Year	Tournament	Level	Partner	Opponent	Score	Result
2022	Spanish Para-Badminton International II	Level 2	(Italy) Yuri Ferrigno	(England) David Follett (Switzerland) Ilaria Renggli	Walkover	(silver) Runner-up
2022	Brazil Para-Badminton International	Level 2	(Italy) Yuri Ferrigno	(Brazil) Sergio Barreto Santana (Brazil) Maria Gilda Dos Santos Do Antunes	21–9, 21–8	(gold) Winner
2022	Peru Para-Badminton International	Level 2	(South Korea) Ryu Dong-hyun	(Chile) Jaime Aranguiz (Brazil) Ana Gomes	21–5, 21–10	(gold) Winner
2023	Spanish Para-Badminton International	Level 2	(Italy) Yuri Ferrigno	(South Korea) Yu Soo-young (South Korea) Kwon Hyun-ah	23–21, 21–19	(gold) Winner
2023	Brazil Para-Badminton International	Level 2	(Italy) Yuri Ferrigno	(South Korea) Yu Soo-young (South Korea) Kwon Hyun-ah	21–15, 21–15	(gold) Winner

=== International Tournaments (2 titles, 5 runners-up) ===
Women's singles
Year	Tournament	Opponent	Score	Result
2018	Irish Para-Badminton International	(South Korea) Lee Sun-ae	14–21, 8–21	(silver) Runner-up
2018	Brazil Para-Badminton International	(Japan) Rie Ogura	17–21, 17–21	(silver) Runner-up
2019	Uganda Para-Badminton International	(Turkey) Emine Seçkin	21–19, 21–19	(gold) Winner

Women's doubles
Year	Tournament	Partner	Opponent	Score	Result
2019	Uganda Para-Badminton International	(Austria) Henriett Koósz	(Germany) Valeska Knoblauch (Belgium) Elke Rongen	18–21, 21–15, 21–17	(gold) Winner
2020	Peru Para-Badminton International	(Germany) Valeska Knoblauch	(Turkey) Emine Seçkin (Belgium) Man-Kei To	14–21, 19–21	(silver) Runner-up

Mixed doubles
Year	Tournament	Partner	Opponent	Score	Result
2018	Irish Para-Badminton International	(South Korea) Jeong Jae-gun	(South Korea) Lee Sam-seop (South Korea) Lee Sun-ae	14–21, 14–21	(silver) Runner-up
2021	Spanish Para-Badminton International	(Italy) Yuri Ferrigno	(South Korea) Kim Kyung-hoon (South Korea) Kang Jung-kum	21–18, 9–21, 16–21	(silver) Runner-up
