= Mischa Ginns =

Australian para-badminton player

Personal information
- Born: 11 May 1981 (age 45)

Sport
- Country: Australia
- Sport: Badminton

Mischa Ginns (born 11 May 1981) is an Australian para-badminton player. She was selected to compete at the 2024 Summer Paralympics but withdrew just prior to the competition due to illness.

== Personal ==
Ginns was born in South Africa on 11 May 1981 and migrated to Australia from South Africa in 2008 to take up a job in accountancy. In April 2012, she ruptured her cervical spinal in a rowing competition and spinal surgery complications left her hospitalised for four years. She has put on hold her chartered accountancy career to focus on badminton.

== Badminton ==
Ginns is classified as WH2. She took up Para-badminton after attending a come-and-try day in 2022. At the 2022 Oceania Para-Badminton Championships she won three gold medals - WH2 women's singles, women's doubles and mixed doubles. At the 2024 BWF Para Badminton World Championships, she advanced to the Women's Singles WH2 Quarterfinals In 2024, she is ranked 12th in Women's WH2 world singles rankings. She was selected to compete at the 2024 Summer Paralympics but withdrew just prior to the competition due to illness.

She is a member of Westside Badminton in Melbourne and a Victorian Institute of Sport scholarship athlete.

In 2022, she was named a finalist in the Sportsperson of the Year - Community at the Victorian Disability Sport and Recreation Awards.
