= Alphia James =

Indian para badminton player

Alphia James (born 29 October 2000) is an Indian para-badminton player from Kerala. She won a bronze medal at the 2026 Asian Para Games in the women's badminton partnering Pallavi Kaluvehalli, in the doubles WH1-2 class.

== Early life ==
James is from Piramadam village, Muvattupuzha taluk, Ernakulam district, Kerala. At the age of 17 years, she fell down from fourth floor and was paralysed from waist down. A former basketball player, she took up powerlifting after the accident, but later switched over to para badminton.

== Career ==
James won a bronze medal in the badminton doubles WH1-2 class, along with Pallavi Kaluvehalli at the 2026 Asian Para Games.

In March 2026, she won a silver medal along with Prem Kumar Ale in the mixed doubles in the WH1-WH2 (wheelchair) category at the Para World Championships.

In 2025, she won a gold at the Khelo India Para Games 2025 in Delhi.
