= Mariam Eniola Bolaji =

Nigerian para-badminton player (born 2005)

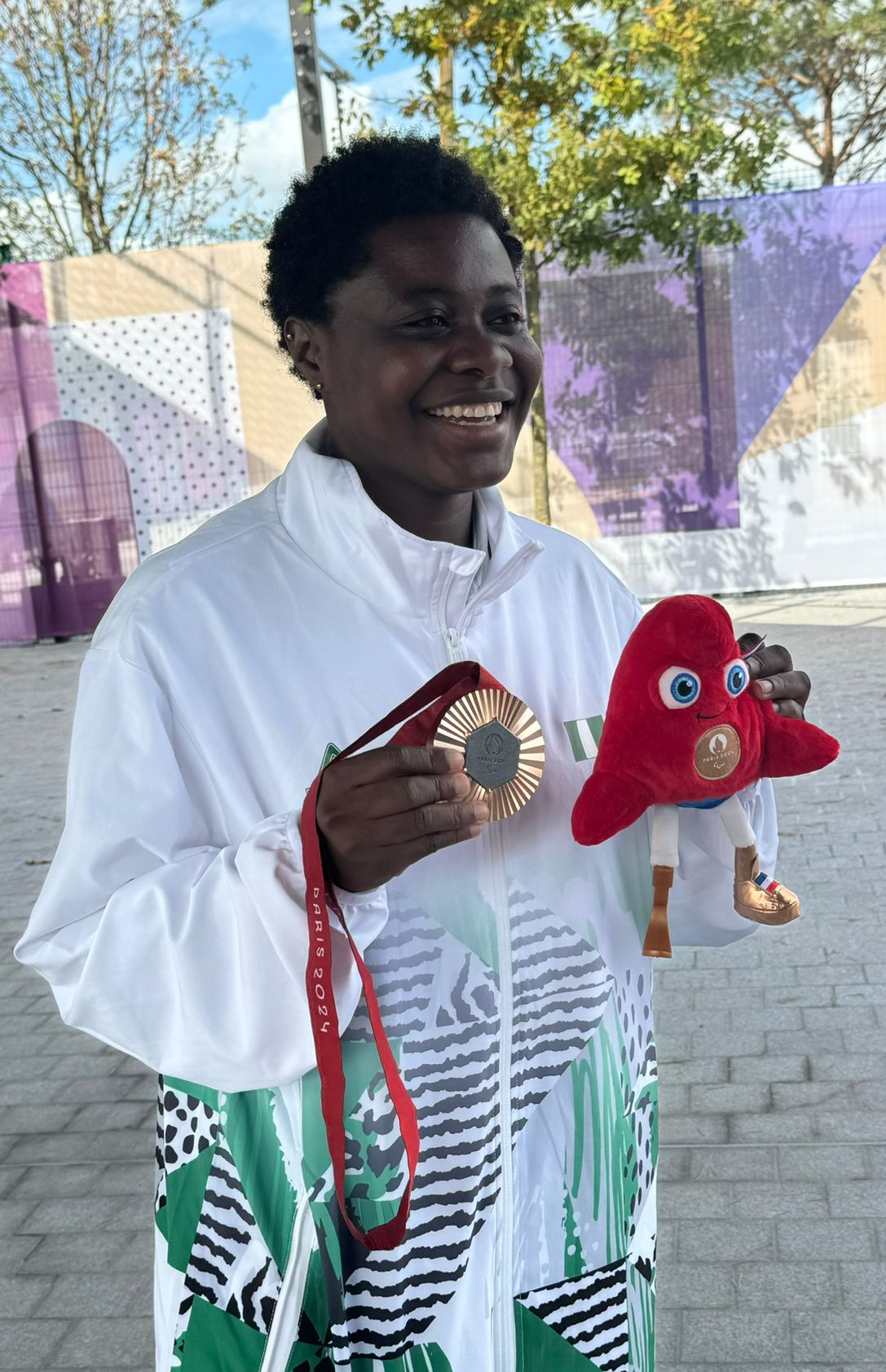
- Bolaji in 2024

Personal information
- Born: 21 September 2005 (age 20) Share, Kwara, Nigeria

Sport
- Country: Nigeria
- Sport: Badminton
Medal record
Representing Nigeria
Women's para-badminton
Paralympic Games
Bronze medal – third place	2024 Paris	Women's singles
World Championships
Silver medal – second place	2026 Manama	Women's singles

Mariam Eniola Bolaji (born 21 September 2005) is a Nigerian para-badminton player. She is ranked 1st in the world in the SL3 Category by the Para Badminton World Federation. She competed at the 2024 Summer Paralympics, where she won the bronze medal in the women's singles SL3 event.

She is the first African to medal in the sport at either Olympics or Paralympics, winning Bronze in the women's SL3 singles at the Games in Paris. Her win marked Nigeria's first medal at the Paris Paralympics.

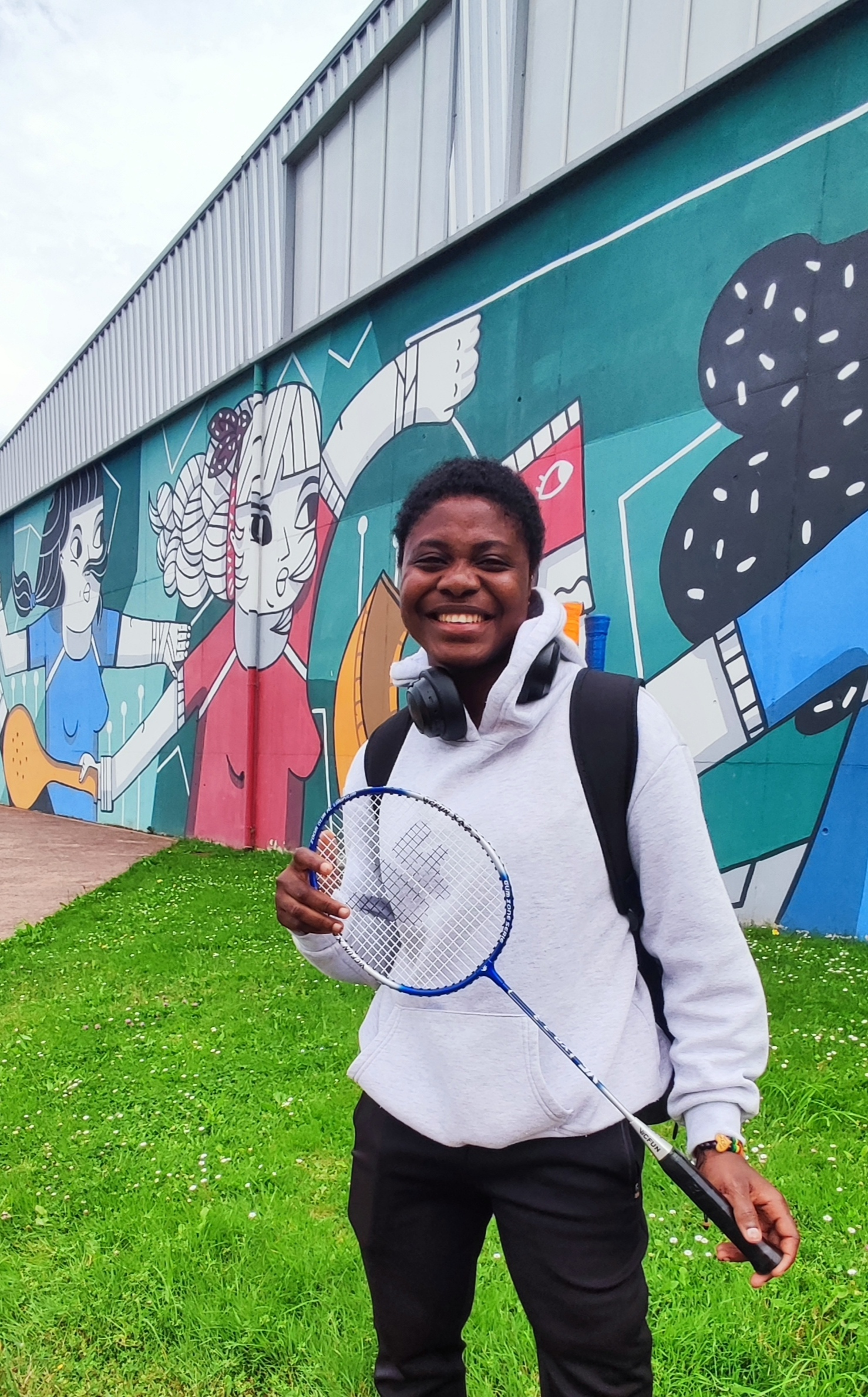
Eniola in Vitoria-Gasteiz
