= Oksana Kozyna =

Ukrainian para badminton player

Personal information
- Born: 11 October 1994 (age 31)

Sport
- Sport: Badminton
Medal record
Para badminton
Representing Ukraine
World Championships
Gold medal – first place	2022 Tokyo	Singles SL3
European Para Championships
Silver medal – second place	2023 Rotterdam	Singles SL3
Bronze medal – third place	2023 Rotterdam	Doubles SL3-SU5

Oksana Kozyna (born 11 October 1994) is a Ukrainian para badminton player who competes in international badminton competitions. She is Ukraine's first World para-badminton champion and has also won two medals in the European Para Championships. She was born without her left femur bone.

Kozyna evacuated Ukraine in 2022 following the 2022 Russian invasion of Ukraine and has emigrated to France where she currently trains.
