= Li Hongyan =

Chinese para-badminton player (born 1998)

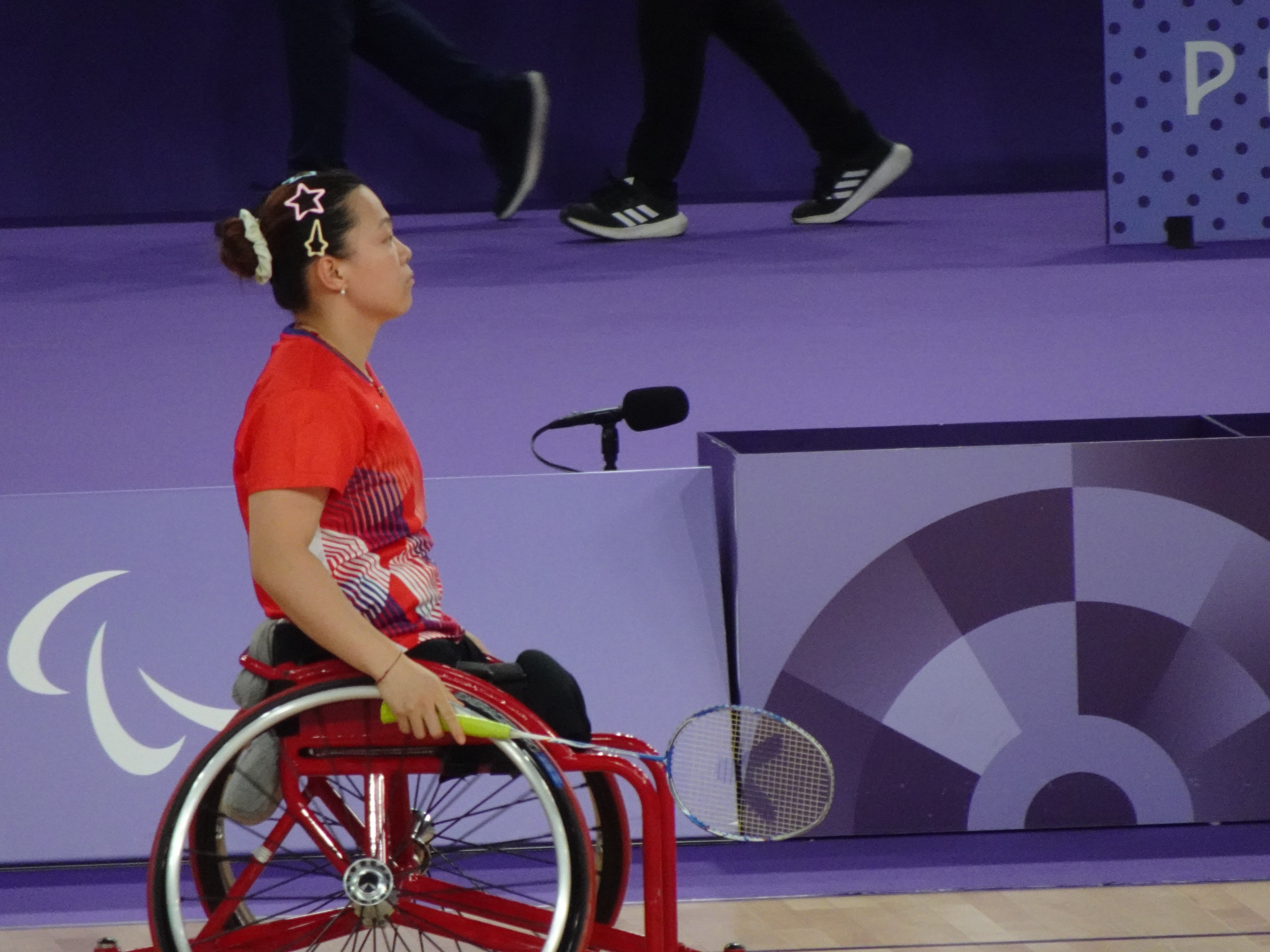
- Li at the 2024 Summer Paralympics

Personal information
- Born: 2 September 1998 (age 27) Handan, China

Sport
- Country: China
- Sport: Badminton
Medal record
Para-badminton
Representing China
Paralympic Games
Silver medal – second place	2024 Paris	Women’s singles
World Championships
Gold medal – first place	2017 Ulsan	Singles WH1
Gold medal – first place	2017 Ulsan	Doubles WH1-WH2
Gold medal – first place	2019 Basel	Mixed doubles WH1-WH2
Silver medal – second place	2019 Basel	Singles WH2
Silver medal – second place	2024 Bangkok	Doubles WH1-WH2
Silver medal – second place	2024 Bangkok	Mixed doubles WH1-WH2
Silver medal – second place	2026 Manama	Women's doubles
Bronze medal – third place	2017 Ulsan	Mixed doubles WH1-WH2
Bronze medal – third place	2024 Bangkok	Singles WH2
Bronze medal – third place	2026 Manama	Women's singles
Asian Para Games
Gold medal – first place	2018 Jakarta	Singles WH1
Gold medal – first place	2018 Jakarta	Doubles WH1-WH2
Silver medal – second place	2022 Hangzhou	Singles WH2
Silver medal – second place	2022 Hangzhou	Mixed doubles WH1-WH2

Li Hongyan (born 2 September 1998) is a Chinese para-badminton player. She competed at the 2024 Summer Paralympics, where she won a silver medal in the women's singles WH2 event.
