= Mandeep Kaur (para-badminton) =

Indian para badminton player

Sport
- Country: India
- Sport: Badminton
- Event: Women's singles SU5; Women's doubles SL3–SU5
Medal record
Women's para-badminton
Representing India
Asian Para Games
Bronze medal – third place	2022 Hangzhou	Women's singles SL3
World Championships
Bronze medal – third place	2022 Tokyo	Women's double's SL3-SU5
Bronze medal – third place	2024 Pattaya	Women's doubles SL3-SU5
Bronze medal – third place	2024 Pattaya	Mixed doubles SL3-SU5
Bronze medal – third place	2026 Manama	Mixed doubles

Mandeep Kaur (born 18 September 1995) is an Indian para athlete from Uttarakhand. She won two bronze medals at the 2022 Asian Para Games. She claimed bronze in Badminton women's double in the SL3 category along with Manisha Ramadass on 27 October 2023 at Hangzhou, China. Earlier on 25 October 2023, she won a bronze in the individual women's singles SL3 event.

== Background ==
Kaur hails from Uttarakhand but trains at Lucknow under coach Gaurav Khanna, a Dronacharya award winner. She is supported by Welspun Foundation.

== Career ==
She won a gold and a silver at the 4th Fazza Dubai Para Badminton International in Dubai in May 2022. She paired with Manisha in the SU5 women's doubles to win the gold before securing a silver in the SL3 singles losing to teammate Manasi Joshi. Earlier, on 22 May 2022, she entered the final defeating top seed Joshi but had to be content with silver, losing to Halime Yildiz in the SL3 singles at the Bahrain Para Badminton International in Manama. In December 2022, she shocked the World champion Oksana Kozyna in the SL3 women's singles finals of the Peru Para Badminton International in Lima. She became World No.1 ranked para badminton player in the WS SL3 category in March 2023.

== Achievements ==
=== World Championships ===
Women's doubles

Year	Venue	Partner	Opponent	Score	Result
2022	Yoyogi National Gymnasium, Tokyo, Japan	(India) Manisha Ramadass	(France) Lénaïg Morin (France) Faustine Noël	17–21, 21–13, 18–21	Bronze
2024	Pattaya Exhibition and Convention Hall, Pattaya, Thailand	(India) Manisha Ramadass	(Indonesia) Leani Ratri Oktila (Indonesia) Khalimatus Sadiyah	19–21, 15–21	Bronze

Mixed doubles

Year	Venue	Partner	Opponent	Score	Result
2024	Pattaya Exhibition and Convention Hall, Pattaya, Thailand	(India) Chirag Baretha	(Indonesia) Hikmat Ramdani (Indonesia) Leani Ratri Oktila	16–21, 15–21	Bronze
