= List of Paralympic medalists in badminton =

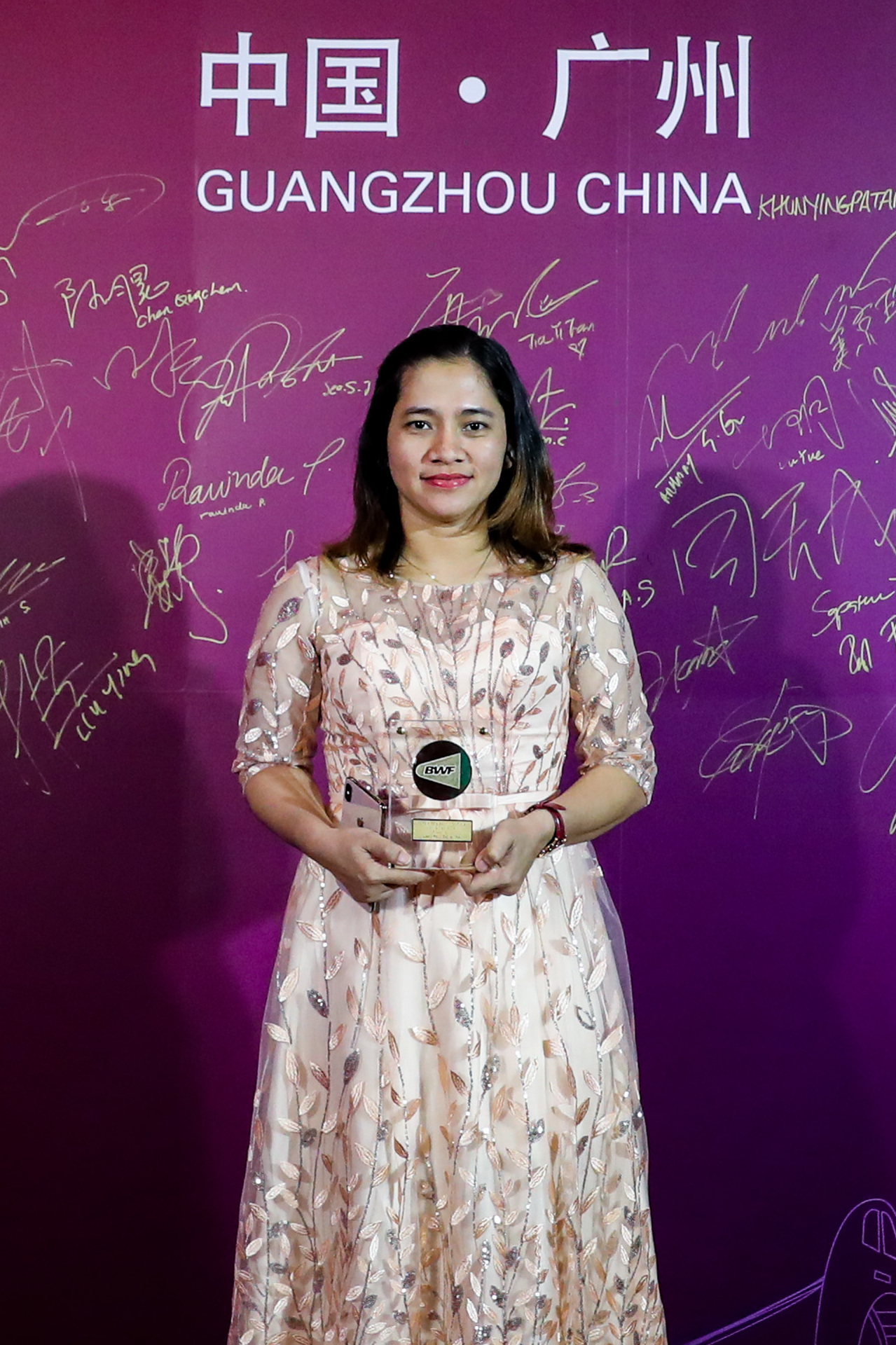
Leani Ratri Oktila played three finals in the 2020 Paralympics, and is currently the most decorated Paralympian in badminton, with 3 golds and 2 silvers.

Para-Badminton debuted at the 2020 Summer Paralympics held in Tokyo, Japan.

Para-Badminton is a variant of the badminton for athletes with a variety of physical disabilities. The sport is governed by the Badminton World Federation (BWF) since 2011.

Leani Ratri Oktila is the all-time leader for the most Paralympic medals in badminton, with three gold and two silver; Qu Zimo and Sarina Satomi (two golds), Cheng Hefang, Liu Yutong and Lucas Mazur (one gold, one silver) each, Daiki Kajiwara and Yuma Yamazaki (one gold, one bronze), Kim Jung-jun (two silvers), Ma Huihui, Yin Menglu, Ayako Suzuki, Lee Dong-seop, and Sujirat Pookkham (one silver, one bronze) and Akiko Sugino (two bronze) are second for the most medals in badminton, each with two. Leani Ratri Oktila, Qu Zimo and Sarina Satomi are the all-time leaders for the most gold medal wins, with two.

As of the 2020 Summer Paralympics, China has been the most successful nation in badminton, winning 10 medals; 8 of them were from the women's singles and doubles tournaments. Japan (9 medals) and Indonesia (6 medals) are the only other nations to have more than five medals. As many as 42 medals (14 gold, 14 silver, and 14 bronze) have been awarded to 38 medalists from 10 NPCs.

== Men ==
=== Men's singles ===
==== Men's singles WH1 ====
Games	Gold	Silver	Bronze
2020 Tokyo	Qu Zimo; China	Lee Sam-seop; South Korea	Lee Dong-seop; South Korea
2024 Paris	Qu Zimo; China	Choi Jung-man; South Korea	Thomas Wandschneider; Germany

==== Men's singles WH2 ====
Games	Gold	Silver	Bronze
2020 Tokyo	Daiki Kajiwara; Japan	Kim Jung-jun; South Korea	Chan Ho Yuen; Hong Kong
2024 Paris	Daiki Kajiwara; Japan	Chan Ho Yuen; Hong Kong	Kim Jung-jun; South Korea

==== Men's singles SL3 ====
Games	Gold	Silver	Bronze
2020 Tokyo	Pramod Bhagat; India	Daniel Bethell; Great Britain	Manoj Sarkar; India
2024 Paris	Kumar Nitesh; India	Daniel Bethell; Great Britain	Mongkhon Bunsun; Thailand

==== Men's singles SL4 ====
Games	Gold	Silver	Bronze
2020 Tokyo	Lucas Mazur; France	Suhas Lalinakere Yathiraj; India	Fredy Setiawan; Indonesia
2024 Paris	Lucas Mazur; France	Suhas Lalinakere Yathiraj; India	Fredy Setiawan; Indonesia

==== Men's singles SU5 ====
Games	Gold	Silver	Bronze
2020 Tokyo	Cheah Liek Hou; Malaysia	Dheva Anrimusthi; Indonesia	Suryo Nugroho; Indonesia
2024 Paris	Cheah Liek Hou; Malaysia	Suryo Nugroho; Indonesia	Dheva Anrimusthi; Indonesia

==== Men's singles SH6 ====
Games	Gold	Silver	Bronze
2020 Tokyo	Krishna Nagar; India	Chu Man Kai; Hong Kong	Krysten Coombs; Great Britain
2024 Paris	Charles Noakes; France	Krysten Coombs; Great Britain	Vitor Tavares; Brazil

=== Men's doubles ===
==== Men's doubles WH1–WH2 ====
Games	Gold	Silver	Bronze
2020 Tokyo	China; Mai Jianpeng; Qu Zimo	South Korea; Kim Jung-jun; Lee Dong-seop	Japan; Daiki Kajiwara; Hiroshi Murayama
2024 Paris	China; Mai Jianpeng; Qu Zimo	South Korea; Jeong Jae-gun; Yu Soo-young	Japan; Daiki Kajiwara; Hiroshi Murayama

== Women's ==
=== Women's singles ===
==== Women's singles WH1 ====
Games	Gold	Silver	Bronze
2020 Tokyo	Sarina Satomi; Japan	Sujirat Pookkham; Thailand	Yin Menglu; China
2024 Paris	Sarina Satomi; Japan	Sujirat Pookkham; Thailand	Yin Menglu; China

==== Women's singles WH2 ====
Games	Gold	Silver	Bronze
2020 Tokyo	Liu Yutong; China	Xu Tingting; China	Yuma Yamazaki; Japan
2024 Paris	Liu Yutong; China	Li Hongyan; China	Ilaria Renggli; Switzerland

==== Women's singles SL3 ====
Games	Gold	Silver	Bronze
2024 Paris	Xiao Zuxian; China	Qonitah Ikhtiar Syakuroh; Indonesia	Mariam Eniola Bolaji; Nigeria

==== Women's singles SL4 ====
Games	Gold	Silver	Bronze
2020 Tokyo	Cheng Hefang; China	Leani Ratri Oktila; Indonesia	Ma Huihui; China
2024 Paris	Cheng Hefang; China	Leani Ratri Oktila; Indonesia	Helle Sofie Sagøy; Norway

==== Women's singles SU5 ====
Games	Gold	Silver	Bronze
2020 Tokyo	Yang Qiuxia; China	Ayako Suzuki; Japan	Akiko Sugino; Japan
2024 Paris	Yang Qiuxia; China	Thulasimathi Murugesan; India	Manisha Ramadass; India

=== Women's doubles ===
==== Women's doubles WH1–WH2 ====
Games	Gold	Silver	Bronze
2020 Tokyo	Japan; Sarina Satomi; Yuma Yamazaki	China; Liu Yutong; Yin Menglu	Thailand; Sujirat Pookkham; Amnouy Wetwithan
2024 Paris	China; Yin Menglu; Liu Yutong	Japan; Sarina Satomi; Yuma Yamazaki	Thailand; Sujirat Pookkham; Amnouy Wetwithan

==== Women's doubles SL3–SU5 ====
Games	Gold	Silver	Bronze
2020 Tokyo	Indonesia; Leani Ratri Oktila; Khalimatus Sadiyah	China; Cheng Hefang; Ma Huihui	Japan; Noriko Ito; Ayako Suzuki

== Mixed ==
=== Mixed doubles SL3–SU5 ===
Games	Gold	Silver	Bronze
2020 Tokyo	Indonesia; Hary Susanto; Leani Ratri Oktila	France; Lucas Mazur; Faustine Noël	Japan; Daisuke Fujihara; Akiko Sugino
2024 Paris	Indonesia; Hikmat Ramdani; Leani Ratri Oktila	Indonesia; Fredy Setiawan; Khalimatus Sadiyah	France; Lucas Mazur; Faustine Noël

=== Mixed doubles SH6 ===
Games	Gold	Silver	Bronze
2024 Paris	China; Lin Naili; Li Fengmei	United States; Miles Krajewski; Jayci Simon	Indonesia; Subhan; Rina Marlina

== Statistics ==
=== Medal leaders ===
Medalist	Nation	Paralympic	Gold	Silver	Bronze	Total
Leani Ratri Oktila	Indonesia (INA)	2020	2	1	0	3
Qu Zimo	China (CHN)	2020	2	0	0	2
Sarina Satomi	Japan (JPN)	2020	2	0	0	2
Cheng Hefang	China (CHN)	2020	1	1	0	2
Liu Yutong	China (CHN)	2020	1	1	0	2
Lucas Mazur	France (FRA)	2020	1	1	0	2
Daiki Kajiwara	Japan (JPN)	2020	1	0	1	2
Yuma Yamazaki	Japan (JPN)	2020	1	0	1	2
Mai Jianpeng	China (CHN)	2020	1	0	0	1
Yang Qiuxia	China (CHN)	2020	1	0	0	1
Pramod Bhagat	India (IND)	2020	1	0	0	1
Krishna Nagar	India (IND)	2020	1	0	0	1
Khalimatus Sadiyah	Indonesia (INA)	2020	1	0	0	1
Hary Susanto	Indonesia (INA)	2020	1	0	0	1
Cheah Liek Hou	Malaysia (MAS)	2020	1	0	0	1
Kim Jung-jun	South Korea (KOR)	2020	0	2	0	2
Ma Huihui	China (CHN)	2020	0	1	1	2
Yin Menglu	China (CHN)	2020	0	1	1	2
Ayako Suzuki	Japan (JPN)	2020	0	1	1	2
Lee Dong-seop	South Korea (KOR)	2020	0	1	1	2
Sujirat Pookkham	Thailand (THA)	2020	0	1	1	2
Xu Tingting	China (CHN)	2020	0	1	0	1
Faustine Noël	France (FRA)	2020	0	1	0	1
Daniel Bethell	Great Britain (GBR)	2020	0	1	0	1
Chu Man Kai	Hong Kong (HKG)	2020	0	1	0	1
Suhas Lalinakere Yathiraj	India (IND)	2020	0	1	0	1
Dheva Anrimusthi	Indonesia (INA)	2020	0	1	0	1
Lee Sam-seop	South Korea (KOR)	2020	0	1	0	1
Akiko Sugino	Japan (JPN)	2020	0	0	2	2
Krysten Coombs	Great Britain (GBR)	2020	0	0	1	1
Chan Ho Yuen	Hong Kong (HKG)	2020	0	0	1	1
Manoj Sarkar	India (IND)	2020	0	0	1	1
Suryo Nugroho	Indonesia (INA)	2020	0	0	1	1
Fredy Setiawan	Indonesia (INA)	2020	0	0	1	1
Daisuke Fujihara	Japan (JPN)	2020	0	0	1	1
Noriko Ito	Japan (JPN)	2020	0	0	1	1
Hiroshi Murayama	Japan (JPN)	2020	0	0	1	1
Amnouy Wetwithan	Thailand (THA)	2020	0	0	1	1
TOTAL			18	18	18	54

== See also ==
- BWF Para-Badminton World Championships
