= Badminton at the Summer Paralympics =

- Governing body: Badminton World Federation
- Events: 14 (men: 7; women: 6; mixed: 1)

Games
- 1960; 1964; 1968; 1972; 1976; 1980; 1984; 1988; 1992; 1996; 2000; 2004; 2008; 2012; 2016; 2020; 2024
- Medalists

Para-Badminton debuted at the 2020 Summer Paralympics held in Tokyo, Japan.

Para-Badminton is a variant of the badminton for athletes with a variety of physical disabilities. The sport is governed by the Badminton World Federation (BWF) since 2011.

== Summary ==
Games	Year	Events	Best nation
16	2020	14	China (1)
17	2024	16	China (2)

== History ==
The 2020 Summer Olympics makes the debut appearance of badminton, with 14 events hold.

=== Events ===
Current program
Event		2020	2024
Men	Singles WH1	X	X
Men	Singles WH2	X	X
Men	Singles SL3	X	X
Men	Singles SL4	X	X
Men	Singles SU5	X	X
Men	Singles SH6	X	X
Men	Doubles WH1–WH2	X	X
Women	Singles WH1	X	X
Women	Singles WH2	X	X
Women	Singles SL3		X
Women	Singles SL4	X	X
Women	Singles SU5	X	X
Women	Singles SH6		X
Women	Doubles WH1–WH2	X	X
Women	Doubles SL3–SU5	X	
Mixed	Doubles SL3–SU5	X	X
Mixed	Doubles SH6		X
Events		14	16

== Medal table ==
As of the 2024 Summer Paralympics

Rank	NPC	Gold	Silver	Bronze	Total
1	China (CHN)	14	5	3	22
2	Japan (JPN)	5	2	6	13
3	Indonesia (INA)	3	6	5	14
4	India (IND)	3	3	3	9
5	France (FRA)	3	1	1	5
6	Malaysia (MAS)	2	0	0	2
7	South Korea (KOR)	0	5	2	7
8	Great Britain (GBR)	0	3	1	4
9	Thailand (THA)	0	2	3	5
10	Hong Kong (HKG)	0	2	1	3
11	United States (USA)	0	1	0	1
12	Brazil (BRA)	0	0	1	1
12	Germany (GER)	0	0	1	1
12	Nigeria (NGR)	0	0	1	1
12	Norway (NOR)	0	0	1	1
12	Switzerland (SUI)	0	0	1	1
Totals (16 entries)		**30**	**30**	**30**	**90**

=== Successful national teams ===
Below is the gold medalists showed based on category and countries after the 2024 Summer Olympics. Bolded numbers below indicate a country as the overall winner of Olympic badminton of that year.

As of the 2024 Summer Paralympics

Rank	Country	2020	2024	Total
1	China	**5**	**9**	14
2	Japan	3	2	5
3	France	1	2	3
3	India	2	1	3
3	Indonesia	2	1	3
6	Malaysia	1	1	2
Total		14	16	30

== Medal summary by event ==
=== Men's singles ===
==== Men's singles WH1 ====
As of 2024 Summer Paralympics

Rank	Nation	Gold	Silver	Bronze	Total
1	China (CHN)	2	0	0	2
2	South Korea (KOR)	0	2	1	3
3	Germany (GER)	0	0	1	1
Totals (3 entries)		2	2	2	6

==== Men's singles WH2 ====
As of 2024 Summer Paralympics

Rank	Nation	Gold	Silver	Bronze	Total
1	Japan (JPN)	2	0	0	2
2	Hong Kong (HKG)	0	1	1	2
2	South Korea (KOR)	0	1	1	2
Totals (3 entries)		2	2	2	6

==== Men's singles SL3 ====
As of 2024 Summer Paralympics

Rank	Nation	Gold	Silver	Bronze	Total
1	India (IND)	2	0	1	3
2	Great Britain (GBR)	0	2	0	2
3	Thailand (THA)	0	0	1	1
Totals (3 entries)		2	2	2	6

==== Men's singles SL4 ====
As of 2024 Summer Paralympics

Rank	Nation	Gold	Silver	Bronze	Total
1	France (FRA)	2	0	0	2
2	India (IND)	0	2	0	2
3	Indonesia (INA)	0	0	2	2
Totals (3 entries)		2	2	2	6

==== Men's singles SU5 ====
As of 2024 Summer Paralympics

Rank	Nation	Gold	Silver	Bronze	Total
1	Malaysia (MAS)	2	0	0	2
2	Indonesia (INA)	0	2	2	4
Totals (2 entries)		2	2	2	6

==== Men's singles SH6 ====
As of 2024 Summer Paralympics

Rank	Nation	Gold	Silver	Bronze	Total
1	France (FRA)	1	0	0	1
1	India (IND)	1	0	0	1
3	Great Britain (GBR)	0	1	1	2
4	Hong Kong (HKG)	0	1	0	1
5	Brazil (BRA)	0	0	1	1
Totals (5 entries)		2	2	2	6

=== Women's singles ===
==== Women's singles WH1 ====
As of 2024 Summer Paralympics

Rank	Nation	Gold	Silver	Bronze	Total
1	Japan (JPN)	2	0	0	2
2	Thailand (THA)	0	2	0	2
3	China (CHN)	0	0	2	2
Totals (3 entries)		2	2	2	6

==== Women's singles WH2 ====
As of 2024 Summer Paralympics

Rank	Nation	Gold	Silver	Bronze	Total
1	China (CHN)	2	2	0	4
2	Japan (JPN)	0	0	1	1
2	Switzerland (SUI)	0	0	1	1
Totals (3 entries)		2	2	2	6

==== Women's singles SL3 ====
As of 2024 Summer Paralympics

Rank	Nation	Gold	Silver	Bronze	Total
1	China (CHN)	1	0	0	1
2	Indonesia (INA)	0	1	0	1
3	Nigeria (NGR)	0	0	1	1
Totals (3 entries)		1	1	1	3

==== Women's singles SL4 ====
As of 2024 Summer Paralympics

Rank	Nation	Gold	Silver	Bronze	Total
1	China (CHN)	2	0	1	3
2	Indonesia (INA)	0	2	0	2
3	Norway (NOR)	0	0	1	1
Totals (3 entries)		2	2	2	6

==== Women's singles SU5 ====
As of 2024 Summer Paralympics

Rank	Nation	Gold	Silver	Bronze	Total
1	China (CHN)	2	0	0	2
2	India (IND)	0	1	1	2
2	Japan (JPN)	0	1	1	2
Totals (3 entries)		2	2	2	6

==== Women's singles SH6 ====
As of 2024 Summer Paralympics

Rank	Nation	Gold	Silver	Bronze	Total
1	China (CHN)	1	1	0	2
2	India (IND)	0	0	1	1
Totals (2 entries)		1	1	1	3

=== Men's doubles ===
==== Men's doubles WH1–WH2 ====
As of 2024 Summer Paralympics

Rank	Nation	Gold	Silver	Bronze	Total
1	China (CHN)	2	0	0	2
2	South Korea (KOR)	0	2	0	2
3	Japan (JPN)	0	0	2	2
Totals (3 entries)		2	2	2	6

=== Women's doubles ===
==== Women's doubles WH1–WH2 ====
As of 2024 Summer Paralympics

Rank	Nation	Gold	Silver	Bronze	Total
1	China (CHN)	1	1	0	2
1	Japan (JPN)	1	1	0	2
3	Thailand (THA)	0	0	2	2
Totals (3 entries)		2	2	2	6

==== Women's doubles SL3–SU5 ====
As of 2020 Summer Paralympics

Rank	Nation	Gold	Silver	Bronze	Total
1	Indonesia (INA)	1	0	0	1
2	China (CHN)	0	1	0	1
3	Japan (JPN)	0	0	1	1
Totals (3 entries)		1	1	1	3

=== Mixed doubles ===
==== Mixed doubles SL3–SU5 ====
As of 2024 Summer Paralympics

Rank	Nation	Gold	Silver	Bronze	Total
1	Indonesia (INA)	2	1	0	3
2	France (FRA)	0	1	1	2
3	Japan (JPN)	0	0	1	1
Totals (3 entries)		2	2	2	6

==== Mixed doubles SH6 ====
As of 2024 Summer Paralympics

Rank	Nation	Gold	Silver	Bronze	Total
1	China (CHN)	1	0	0	1
2	United States (USA)	0	1	0	1
3	Indonesia (INA)	0	0	1	1
Totals (3 entries)		1	1	1	3

== Competition ==
Paralympics badminton consists of a group stage and single-elimination tournament. Each match is played to the best of three games. Games are up to 21 points. Rally scoring is used, meaning a player does not need to be serving to score. A player must win by two points or be the first player to 30 points.

== Participating nations ==
The following nations have taken part in the badminton competition. The numbers in the table indicate the number of competitors sent to that year's Paralympics.

Nation	2020	2024	Year
Australia	2	2	2
Austria	–	1	1
Belgium	–	2	1
Brazil	1	3	2
Canada	1	1	2
Chile	–	1	1
China	9	13	2
Chinese Taipei	1	4	2
Denmark	1	1	2
Egypt	1	–	1
France	6	8	2
Germany	6	3	2
Great Britain	4	4	2
Hong Kong	2	2	2
India	7	13	2
Indonesia	7	9	2
Israel	1	2	2
Italy	–	1	1
Japan	13	12	2
Malaysia	2	5	2
Netherlands	1	–	1
New Zealand	–	1	1
Nigeria	–	2	1
Norway	1	1	2
Peru	1	3	2
Poland	1	2	2
Portugal	1	1	2
RPC	1	–	1
South Korea	7	7	2
Switzerland	2	3	2
Thailand	7	8	2
Turkey	2	2	2
Uganda	1	–	1
Ukraine	1	1	2
United States	–	2	1
Nations	28	31	35
Year	2020	2024	2

== See also ==
- Badminton at the Summer Olympics
- Badminton at the 2020 Summer Paralympics
