= Badminton at the 2024 Summer Paralympics =

Badminton at the XVII Paralympic Games
- Paralympic Badminton
- Venue: Porte de La Chapelle Arena, Paris
- Dates: 29 August – 2 September 2024
- Competitors: 120 in 16 events from 31 nations

Badminton at the 2024 Summer Paralympics was played at the Porte de La Chapelle Arena in Paris, France, from 29 August to 2 September. There were 16 events, two more than the previous Games; seven events each for men and women (six singles, one doubles) and two mixed doubles events.

== Classification ==
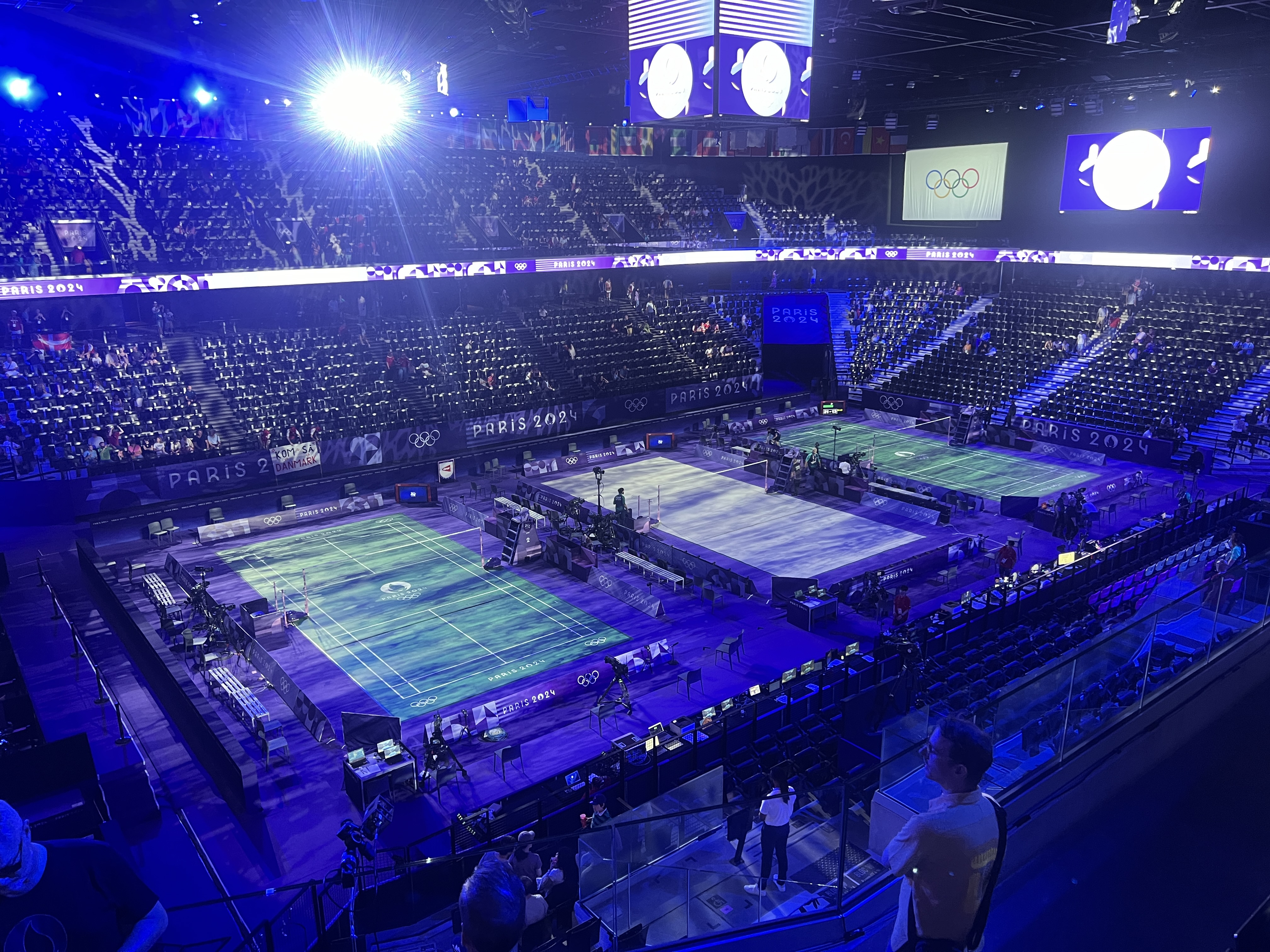
Porte de La Chapelle Arena during the Olympics

There will be six different classes in competition.

- WH1: Athletes who have impairment in both lower limbs and trunk and/or have high spinal cord injuries. They may also have impaired hand function which could impact the ability to manoeuvre in their wheelchair. Their playing style is by holding their wheelchair with one hand while the other hand is moving the racquet; they will push or pull themselves to a neutral wheelchair sitting position after the stroke.
- WH2: Similar to WH1 athletes, WH2 athletes have one or more impairments in their lower limbs, one or more loss of legs (above the knee) and would have minimal or no trunk impairment and/or lower. They would move their wheelchairs quicker than WH1 athletes and they will hold onto their wheels less to maintain their balance.
- SL3: Athletes would have impairment in one or both lower limbs and have poor walking/running balance: to reduce their impairment, they would often compete on half-court (lengthwise). These athletes would have cerebral palsy, bilateral polio or loss of both legs below the knee.
- SL4: Athletes would run faster and have better balance than athletes who are in the SL3 class, they would have an impairment in one or both lower limbs, unilateral polio or mild cerebral palsy. These athletes would play on full-court.
- SU5: Unlike the SL3 and SL4 sport classes, SU5 have impairment in their upper limbs such as a missing thumb which restricts grip and power of the stroke or loss of an arm due to amputation or nerve damage. Also, athletes may have a severe impairment to their non-playing arm which can affect balance movements, trunk rotation and ability to serve.
- SH6: Athletes who have achondroplasia and short stature.

== Qualification ==
Ranking period starts from January 2023 and ends in March 2024.

== Schedule ==
The schedule are as below:

G	Group stage	¼	Quarter-finals	½	Semi-finals	B	Bronze medal match	G	Gold medal match

Events	Dates													
Events	Thu 29 Aug		Fri 30 Aug		Sat 31 Aug		Sun 1 Sep				Mon 2 Sep			
Events	M	E	M	E	M	E	M		E		M		E	
Men's singles WH1		G		G	G		¼	½			B		G	
Men's singles WH2			G	G		G	½						B	G
Men's singles SL3	G		G		G				½		B	G		
Men's singles SL4	G		G		G				½				B	G
Men's singles SU5	G		G	G	G	G			½				B	G
Men's singles SH6		G		G		G	¼		½				B	G
Women's singles WH1		G	G	G	G	¼	½				B	G		
Women's singles WH2			G	G	G	¼	½				B		G	
Women's singles SL3	G		G		G		¼		½		B	G		
Women's singles SL4	G		G		G		¼		½		B	G		
Women's singles SU5	G	G	G	G	G	G	¼		½				B	G
Women's singles SH6		G		G		G	¼		½				B	G
Men's doubles WH1–WH2	G		G		G	½			B	G				
Women's doubles WH1–WH2	G		G	G		½			B	G				
Mixed doubles SL3–SU5	G	G		G		½					B	G		
Mixed doubles SH6	G	G		G		½					B	G		

== Participating nations ==
120 athletes from 31 nations competing this edition of Paralympic.

- Australia (2)
- Austria (1)
- Belgium (2)
- Brazil (3)
- Canada (1)
- Chile (1)
- China (13)
- Chinese Taipei (4)
- Denmark (1)
- France (8) (Host)
- Germany (3)
- Great Britain (4)
- Hong Kong (2)
- India (13)
- Indonesia (9)
- Israel (2)
- Italy (1)
- Japan (12)
- Malaysia (5)
- New Zealand (1)
- Nigeria (2)
- Norway (1)
- Peru (3)
- Poland (2)
- Portugal (1)
- South Korea (7)
- Switzerland (3)
- Thailand (8)
- Turkey (2)
- Ukraine (1)
- United States (2)

== Medal table ==
* Host nation (France)

Rank	NPC	Gold	Silver	Bronze	Total
1	China	9	2	1	12
2	Japan	2	1	1	4
3	France*	2	0	1	3
4	Indonesia	1	4	3	8
5	India	1	2	2	5
6	Malaysia	1	0	0	1
7	South Korea	0	2	1	3
8	Great Britain	0	2	0	2
9	Thailand	0	1	2	3
10	Hong Kong	0	1	0	1
10	United States	0	1	0	1
12	Brazil	0	0	1	1
12	Germany	0	0	1	1
12	Nigeria	0	0	1	1
12	Norway	0	0	1	1
12	Switzerland	0	0	1	1
Totals (16 entries)		16	16	16	48

== Medalists ==
=== Singles events ===
Event	Class	Gold	Silver	Bronze
Men's singles	WH1	Qu Zimo; China	Choi Jung-man; South Korea	Thomas Wandschneider; Germany
Men's singles	WH2	Daiki Kajiwara; Japan	Chan Ho Yuen; Hong Kong	Kim Jung-jun; South Korea
Men's singles	SL3	Kumar Nitesh; India	Daniel Bethell; Great Britain	Mongkhon Bunsun; Thailand
Men's singles	SL4	Lucas Mazur; France	Suhas Lalinakere Yathiraj; India	Fredy Setiawan; Indonesia
Men's singles	SU5	Cheah Liek Hou; Malaysia	Suryo Nugroho; Indonesia	Dheva Anrimusthi; Indonesia
Men's singles	SH6	Charles Noakes; France	Krysten Coombs; Great Britain	Vitor Tavares; Brazil
Women's singles	WH1	Sarina Satomi; Japan	Sujirat Pookkham; Thailand	Yin Menglu; China
Women's singles	WH2	Liu Yutong; China	Li Hongyan; China	Ilaria Renggli; Switzerland
Women's singles	SL3	Xiao Zuxian; China	Qonitah Ikhtiar Syakuroh; Indonesia	Mariam Eniola Bolaji; Nigeria
Women's singles	SL4	Cheng Hefang; China	Leani Ratri Oktila; Indonesia	Helle Sofie Sagøy; Norway
Women's singles	SU5	Yang Qiuxia; China	Thulasimathi Murugesan; India	Manisha Ramadass; India
Women's singles	SH6	Li Fengmei; China	Lin Shuangbao; China	Nithya Sre Sivan; India

=== Doubles events ===
Event	Class	Gold	Silver	Bronze
Men's doubles	WH1–WH2	China; Mai Jianpeng; Qu Zimo	South Korea; Jeong Jae-gun; Yu Soo-young	Japan; Hiroshi Murayama; Daiki Kajiwara
Women's doubles	WH1–WH2	China; Yin Menglu; Liu Yutong	Japan; Sarina Satomi; Yuma Yamazaki	Thailand; Sujirat Pookkham; Amnouy Wetwithan
Mixed doubles	SL3–SU5	Indonesia; Hikmat Ramdani; Leani Ratri Oktila	Indonesia; Fredy Setiawan; Khalimatus Sadiyah	France; Lucas Mazur; Faustine Noël
Mixed doubles	SH6	China; Lin Naili; Li Fengmei	United States; Miles Krajewski; Jayci Simon	Indonesia; Subhan; Rina Marlina

== See also ==
- Badminton at the 2024 Summer Olympics
