= Badminton at the 2022 Asian Para Games – Women's singles WH1 =

Badminton tournament

Badminton's women's singles WH1 at the 2022 Asian Para Games
- Venue: Binjiang Gymnasium, Hangzhou
- Dates: 20 – 26 August 2023
- Competitors: 6 from 5 nations

Medalists
gold medal	Sarina Satomi	Japan
silver medal	Sujirat Pookkham	Thailand
bronze medal	Yin Menglu	China
bronze medal	Fan Chaoyue	China

The women's singles WH1 badminton tournament at the 2022 Asian Para Games is playing from 20 to 26 October 2023 in Binjiang Gymnasium, Hangzhou. A total of 6 players competed at the tournament, two of whom was seeded.

== Competition schedule ==
Plays are taking place between 20 and 26 October 2023.

GS	Group stage	½	Semifinals	F	Final

Events	Fri 20	Sat 21	Sun 22	Mon 23	Tue 24	Wed 25	Thu 26	Fri 27
Women's singles WH1	GS			GS	GS	½	F	

== Seeds ==
The following players were seeded:

1. Sarina Satomi (JPN) (champion; gold medalist)
2. Kwon Hyun-ah (KOR) (group stage)

== Group stage ==
=== Group A ===
Pos	Team	Pld	W	L	GF	GA	GD	PF	PA	PD	Qualification
1	Sarina Satomi (JPN) [1]	2	2	0	4	0	+4	84	40	+44	Qualification to elimination stage
2	Fan Chaoyue (CHN) (H)	2	1	1	2	2	0	66	71	−5	Qualification to elimination stage
3	Hu Guang-chiou (TPE)	2	0	2	0	4	−4	45	84	−39	

Source: Group A – standings
(H) Host

Date		Score		Game 1	Game 2	Game 3
20 Oct	Hu Guang-chiou (Chinese Taipei)	0–2	(China) Fan Chaoyue	15–21	14–21	
23 Oct	Sarina Satomi (Japan)	2–0	(China) Fan Chaoyue	21–7	21–17	
24 Oct	Sarina Satomi (Japan)	2–0	(Chinese Taipei) Hu Guang-chiou	21–8	21–8	

=== Group B ===
Pos	Team	Pld	W	L	GF	GA	GD	PF	PA	PD	Qualification
1	Sujirat Pookkham (THA)	2	2	0	4	1	+3	105	96	+9	Qualification to elimination stage
2	Yin Menglu (CHN) (H)	2	1	1	3	2	+1	102	77	+25	Qualification to elimination stage
3	Kwon Hyun-ah (KOR) [2]	2	0	2	0	4	−4	51	85	−34	

Source: Group B – standings
(H) Host

Date		Score		Game 1	Game 2	Game 3
20 Oct	Yin Menglu (China)	1–2	(Thailand) Sujirat Pookkham	19–21	21–19	20–22
23 Oct	Kwon Hyun-ah (South Korea)	0–2	(Thailand) Sujirat Pookkham	16–21	20–22	
24 Oct	Kwon Hyun-ah (South Korea)	0–2	(China) Yin Menglu	8–21	7–21	

== Elimination round ==
Top two ranked in each group qualified to the elimination round, the draw will be decided after the previous round finished.

Semi-finals
1	Sarina Satomi (JPN)	14	21	21
Yin Menglu (CHN)	21	19	14
Fan Chaoyue (CHN)	19	20
Sujirat Pookkham (THA)	21	22

Final
1	Sarina Satomi (JPN)	21	21
Sujirat Pookkham (THA)	15	19
