= Liu Yutong =

Chinese para-badminton player

Liu Yutong 刘禹彤
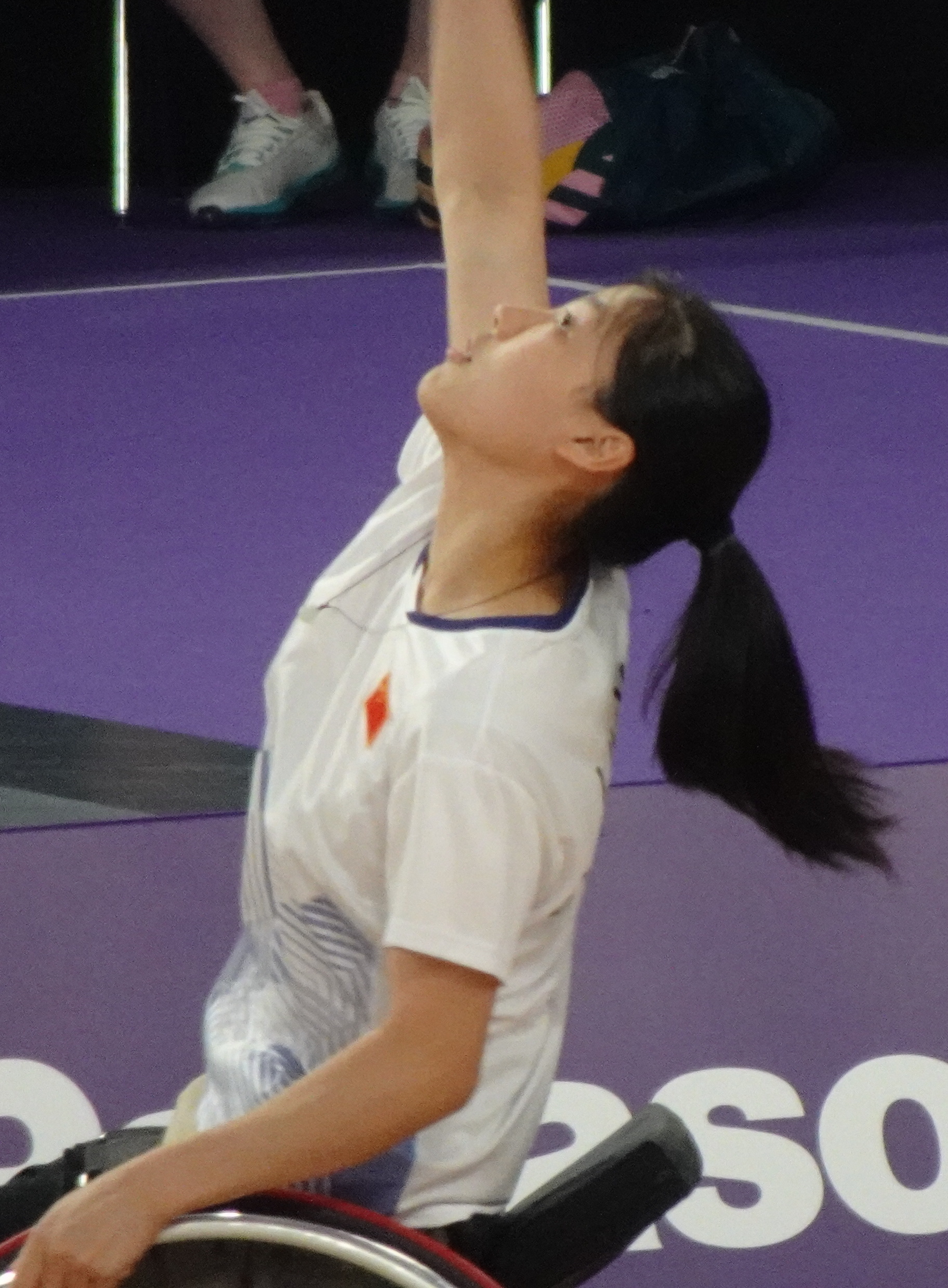
- Liu at the 2024 Summer Paralympics

Personal information
- Born: 5 March 2004 (age 22) Cangzhou, Hebei, China

Sport
- Country: China
- Sport: Badminton
- Coached by: Qu Fuchun

Women's singles WH2 Women's doubles WH1–WH2 Mixed doubles WH1–WH2
- Highest ranking: 1 (WS 1 January 2019); 1 (WD with Yin Menglu 18 July 2022); 3 (XD with Qu Zimo 6 April 2019)
- Current ranking: 3 (WS); 2 (WD with Yin Menglu); 4 (XD with Qu Zimo) (1 November 2022)
Medal record
Para-badminton
Representing China
Paralympic Games
Gold medal – first place	2020 Tokyo	Women's singles
Gold medal – first place	2024 Paris	Women's singles
Gold medal – first place	2024 Paris	Women's doubles
Silver medal – second place	2020 Tokyo	Women's doubles
World Championships
Gold medal – first place	2017 Ulsan	Women's singles
Gold medal – first place	2019 Basel	Women's singles
Gold medal – first place	2019 Basel	Women's doubles
Gold medal – first place	2024 Pattaya	Women's singles
Gold medal – first place	2024 Pattaya	Women's doubles
Gold medal – first place	2024 Pattaya	Mixed doubles
Gold medal – first place	2026 Manama	Women's singles
Gold medal – first place	2026 Manama	Women's doubles
Gold medal – first place	2026 Manama	Mixed doubles
Bronze medal – third place	2017 Ulsan	Women's doubles
Asian Para Games
Gold medal – first place	2018 Jakarta	Women's singles
Gold medal – first place	2018 Jakarta	Mixed doubles
Gold medal – first place	2022 Hangzhou	Women's singles
Gold medal – first place	2022 Hangzhou	Women's doubles
Gold medal – first place	2022 Hangzhou	Mixed doubles
Bronze medal – third place	2018 Jakarta	Women's doubles
Asian Championships
Gold medal – first place	2016 Beijing	Women's singles
Asian Youth Para Games
Gold medal – first place	2017 Dubai	Women's singles

Liu Yutong (born 5 March 2004) is a Chinese para badminton player. She won gold in para-badminton at the 2020 Summer Paralympics in the women's singles WH2 event. She also won silver in the 2020 Olympic women's doubles WH1–WH2 event before snatching gold in 2024 with her partner Yin Menglu.

== Personal life ==
Liu was born in Cangzhou. In 2009, Liu was involved in a traffic accident which caused her to lose both of her legs. In 2016, she was drafted to the Chinese national wheelchair badminton team.

== Achievements ==
=== Paralympic Games ===
Women's singles WH2

Year	Venue	Opponent	Score	Result
2020	Yoyogi National Gymnasium, Tokyo, Japan	(China) Xu Tingting	21–15, 21–15	Gold
2024	Porte de La Chapelle Arena, Paris, France	(China) Li Hongyan	21–15, 21–13	Gold

Women's doubles WH1–WH2

Year	Venue	Partner	Opponent	Score	Result
2020	Yoyogi National Gymnasium, Tokyo, Japan	(China) Yin Menglu	(Japan) Sarina Satomi (Japan) Yuma Yamazaki	21–16, 16–21, 13–21	Silver
2024	Porte de La Chapelle Arena, Paris, France	(China) Yin Menglu	(Japan) Sarina Satomi (Japan) Yuma Yamazaki	21–17, 21–19	Gold

=== World Championships ===
Women's singles
Year	Venue	Opponent	Score	Result
2017	Dongchun Gymnasium, Ulsan, South Korea	(China) Xu Tingting	21–8, 21–11	Gold
2019	St. Jakobshalle; Basel, Switzerland	(China) Li Hongyan	21–12, 21–11	Gold
2024	Pattaya Exhibition and Convention Hall; Pattaya, Thailand	(Peru) Pilar Jáuregui	21–8, 21–4	Gold

Women's doubles
Year	Venue	Partner	Opponent	Score	Result
2017	Dongchun Gymnasium, Ulsan, South Korea	(China) Zhang Jing	(Thailand) Sujirat Pookkham (Thailand) Amnouy Wetwithan	7–21, 12–21	Bronze
2019	St. Jakobshalle; Basel, Switzerland	(China) Yin Menglu	(Thailand) Sujirat Pookkham (Thailand) Amnouy Wetwithan	21–11, 21–15	Gold
2024	Pattaya Exhibition and Convention Hall, Pattaya, Thailand	(China) Yin Menglu	(China) Fan Chaoyue (China) Li Hongyan	21–14, 21–10	Gold

Mixed doubles
Year	Venue	Partner	Opponent	Score	Result
2024	Pattaya Exhibition and Convention Hall, Pattaya, Thailand	(China) Qu Zimo	(China) Yang Tong (China) Li Hongyan	21–12, 21–12	Gold

=== Asian Para Games ===
Women's singles
Year	Venue	Opponent	Score	Result
2018	Istora Gelora Bung Karno; Jakarta, Indonesia	(China) Xu Tingting	22–20, 21–16	Gold
2022	Binjiang Gymnasium; Hangzhou, China	(China) Li Hongyan	21–8, 21–10	Gold

Women's doubles
Year	Venue	Partner	Opponent	Score	Result
2018	Istora Gelora Bung Karno, Jakarta, Indonesia	(China) Zhang Jing	(Thailand) Sujirat Pookkham (Thailand) Amnouy Wetwithan	15–21, 22–24	Bronze
2022	Binjiang Gymnasium, Hangzhou, China	(China) Yin Menglu	(Japan) Sarina Satomi (Japan) Yuma Yamazaki	Round robin	Gold

Mixed doubles
Year	Venue	Partner	Opponent	Score	Result
2018	Istora Gelora Bung Karno, Jakarta, Indonesia	(China) Qu Zimo	(China) Mai Jianpeng (China) Li Hongyan	14–21, 21–18, 21–18	Gold
2022	Binjiang Gymnasium, Hangzhou, China	(China) Qu Zimo	(China) Yang Tong (China) Li Hongyan	21–7, 21–12	Gold

=== Asian Championships ===
Women's singles
Year	Venue	Opponent	Score	Result
2016	China Administration of Sport for Persons with Disabilities; Beijing, China	(Thailand) Amnouy Wetwithan	21–16, 21–11	Gold

=== Asian Youth Para Games ===
Women's singles

Year	Venue	Opponent	Score	Result
2017 (Note: This tournament used a round robin system.)	Al Wasl Club, Dubai, United Arab Emirates	(China) Yang Fan	21–14, 21–10	Gold
2017	Al Wasl Club, Dubai, United Arab Emirates	(South Korea) Jung Gyeo-ul	21–4, 21–5	Gold
2017	Al Wasl Club, Dubai, United Arab Emirates	(China) Li Hongyan	21–10, 21–9	Gold

=== International Tournaments (9 titles, 1 runner-up) ===
Women's singles

Year	Tournament	Opponent	Score	Result
2019	Turkish Para Badminton International	(China) Xu Tingting	21–17, 21–15	(gold) Winner
2019	Dubai Para Badminton International	(China) Li Hongyan	21–5, 21–10	(gold) Winner
2019	China Para Badminton International	(China) Xu Tingting	21–16, 21–11	(gold) Winner
2019	China Para Badminton International	(Spain) Marcela Quinteros	21–6, 21–5	(gold) Winner
2019	China Para Badminton International	(China) Li Hongyan	21–11, 21–8	(gold) Winner
2019	China Para Badminton International	(Thailand) Amnouy Wetwithan	21–10, 21–5	(gold) Winner
2019	Japan Para Badminton International	(China) Xu Tingting	21–15, 21–15	(gold) Winner
2020	Brazil Para Badminton International	(China) Xu Tingting	21–16, 21–15	(gold) Winner

Women's doubles
Year	Tournament	Partner	Opponent	Score	Result
2019	Turkish Para Badminton International	(China) Yin Menglu	(China) Xu Tingting (China) Zhang Jing	18–21, 16–21	(silver) Runner-up
2020	Brazil Para Badminton International	(China) Yin Menglu	(Turkey) Emine Seçkin (Belgium) To Man-kei	21–13, 21–11	(gold) Winner

Mixed doubles

Year	Tournament	Partner	Opponent	Score	Result
2019	Turkish Para Badminton International	(China) Qu Zimo	(China) Mai Jianpeng (China) Yin Menglu	21–8, 21–12	(gold) Winner
2019	Dubai Para Badminton International	(China) Qu Zimo	(Switzerland) Luca Olgiati (Switzerland) Karin Suter-Erath	21–5, 21–10	(gold) Winner
2019	China Para Badminton International	(China) Qu Zimo	(China) Zhao Xin (China) Zhang Jing	21–11, 21–12	(gold) Winner
2019	China Para Badminton International	(China) Qu Zimo	(Chinese Taipei) Chan Kun-yi (Belgium) To Man-kei	21–8, 21–5	(gold) Winner
2019	China Para Badminton International	(China) Qu Zimo	(China) Yang Tong (China) Li Hongyan	21–15, 21–11	(gold) Winner
2019	China Para Badminton International	(China) Qu Zimo	(Germany) Rick Cornell Hellmann (Germany) Valeska Knoblauch	21–10, 21–9	(gold) Winner
