= 2024 BWF Para-Badminton World Championships =

Tournament details
- Dates: February 20–25, 2024
- Edition: 14th
- Venue: Pattaya Exhibition and Convention Hall, 'P.E.A.C.H'
- Location: Pattaya, Thailand

The 2024 BWF Para-Badminton World Championships (officially known as NSDF Royal Beach Cliff BWF Para Badminton World Championships 2024) was held from 20 to 25 February 2024 in Pattaya, Thailand.

== Medalists ==
=== Men's events ===
Singles

Event	Gold	Silver	Bronze
WH1	(China) Qu Zimo	(South Korea) Choi Jung-man	(South Korea) Jeong Jae-gun
WH1	(China) Qu Zimo	(South Korea) Choi Jung-man	(China) Yang Tong
WH2	(Japan) Daiki Kajiwara	(South Korea) Yu Soo-young	(China) Mai Jianpeng
WH2	(Japan) Daiki Kajiwara	(South Korea) Yu Soo-young	(South Korea) Kim Jung-jun
SL3	(India) Pramod Bhagat	(England) Daniel Bethell	(India) Kumar Nitesh
SL3	(India) Pramod Bhagat	(England) Daniel Bethell	(India) Manoj Sarkar
SL4	(India) Suhas Lalinakere Yathiraj	(Indonesia) Fredy Setiawan	(India) Sukant Kadam
SL4	(India) Suhas Lalinakere Yathiraj	(Indonesia) Fredy Setiawan	(France) Lucas Mazur
SU5	(Malaysia) Cheah Liek Hou	(Indonesia) Dheva Anrimusthi	(Chinese Taipei) Fang Jen-yu
SU5	(Malaysia) Cheah Liek Hou	(Indonesia) Dheva Anrimusthi	(Japan) Taiyo Imai
SH6	(India) Krishna Nagar	(China) Lin Naili	(France) Charles Noakes
SH6	(India) Krishna Nagar	(China) Lin Naili	(Brazil) Vitor Tavares

Doubles

Event	Gold	Silver	Bronze
WH1–WH2	(China) Mai Jianpeng (China) Qu Zimo	(Malaysia) Noor Azwan Noorlan (Malaysia) Muhammad Ikhwan Ramli	(South Korea) Choi Jung-man (South Korea) Kim Jung-jun
WH1–WH2	(China) Mai Jianpeng (China) Qu Zimo	(Malaysia) Noor Azwan Noorlan (Malaysia) Muhammad Ikhwan Ramli	(Thailand) Jakarin Homhual (Thailand) Dumnern Junthong
SL3–SL4	(Indonesia) Dwiyoko (Indonesia) Fredy Setiawan	(Thailand) Mongkhon Bunsun (Thailand) Siripong Teamarrom	(India) Pramod Bhagat (India) Sukant Kadam
SL3–SL4	(Indonesia) Dwiyoko (Indonesia) Fredy Setiawan	(Thailand) Mongkhon Bunsun (Thailand) Siripong Teamarrom	(India) Nehal Gupta (India) Naveen Sivakumar
SU5	(Malaysia) Muhammad Fareez Anuar (Malaysia) Cheah Liek Hou	(India) Chirag Baretha (India) Raj Kumar	(Indonesia) Dheva Anrimusthi (Indonesia) Hafizh Briliansyah Prawiranegara
SU5	(Malaysia) Muhammad Fareez Anuar (Malaysia) Cheah Liek Hou	(India) Chirag Baretha (India) Raj Kumar	(China) Li Mingpan (China) Shi Shengzhuo
SH6	(China) Lin Naili (China) Zeng Qingtao	(Hong Kong) Chu Man Kai (Hong Kong) Wong Chun Yim	(Peru) Nilton Quispe (Peru) Héctor Salva
SH6	(China) Lin Naili (China) Zeng Qingtao	(Hong Kong) Chu Man Kai (Hong Kong) Wong Chun Yim	(United States) Miles Krajewski (Brazil) Vitor Tavares

=== Women's events ===
Singles

Event	Gold	Silver	Bronze
WH1	(China) Yin Menglu	(Thailand) Sujirat Pookkham	(Japan) Sarina Satomi
WH1	(China) Yin Menglu	(Thailand) Sujirat Pookkham	(Belgium) Man-Kei To
WH2	(China) Liu Yutong	(Peru) Pilar Jáuregui	(China) Li Hongyan
WH2	(China) Liu Yutong	(Peru) Pilar Jáuregui	(Japan) Yuma Yamazaki
SL3	(China) Xiao Zuxian	(Indonesia) Qonitah Ikhtiar Syakuroh	(India) Manasi Joshi
SL3	(China) Xiao Zuxian	(Indonesia) Qonitah Ikhtiar Syakuroh	(Turkey) Halime Yıldız
SL4	(China) Cheng Hefang	(Indonesia) Leani Ratri Oktila	(India) Palak Kohli
SL4	(China) Cheng Hefang	(Indonesia) Leani Ratri Oktila	(Norway) Helle Sofie Sagøy
SU5	(China) Yang Qiuxia	(India) Manisha Ramadass	(France) Maud Lefort
SU5	(China) Yang Qiuxia	(India) Manisha Ramadass	(Denmark) Cathrine Rosengren
SH6	(China) Li Fengmei	(China) Lin Shuangbao	(Peru) Giuliana Póveda
SH6	(China) Li Fengmei	(China) Lin Shuangbao	(India) Nithya Sre Sivan

Doubles

Event	Gold	Silver	Bronze
WH1–WH2	(China) Liu Yutong (China) Yin Menglu	(China) Fan Chaoyue (China) Li Hongyan	(Thailand) Sujirat Pookkham (Thailand) Amnouy Wetwithan
WH1–WH2	(China) Liu Yutong (China) Yin Menglu	(China) Fan Chaoyue (China) Li Hongyan	(Japan) Sarina Satomi (Japan) Yuma Yamazaki
SL3–SU5	(Indonesia) Leani Ratri Oktila (Indonesia) Khalimatus Sadiyah	(India) Manasi Joshi (India) Thulasimathi Murugesan	(India) Mandeep Kaur (India) Manisha Ramdass
SL3–SU5	(Indonesia) Leani Ratri Oktila (Indonesia) Khalimatus Sadiyah	(India) Manasi Joshi (India) Thulasimathi Murugesan	(China) Xiao Zuxian (China) Yang Qiuxia
SH6	(China) Li Fengmei (China) Lin Shuangbao	(India) Rachana Patel (India) Nithya Sre Sivan	(Peru) Rubí Fernández (Peru) Giuliana Póveda
SH6	(China) Li Fengmei (China) Lin Shuangbao	(India) Rachana Patel (India) Nithya Sre Sivan	(Poland) Daria Bujnicka (Poland) Oliwia Szmigiel

=== Mixed events ===
Doubles

Event	Gold	Silver	Bronze
WH1–WH2	(China) Qu Zimo (China) Liu Yutong	(China) Yang Tong (China) Li Hongyan	(South Korea) Choi Jung-man (South Korea) Lee Sun-ae
WH1–WH2	(China) Qu Zimo (China) Liu Yutong	(China) Yang Tong (China) Li Hongyan	(Italy) Yuri Ferrigno (Peru) Pilar Jáuregui
SL3-SU5	(Indonesia) Hikmat Ramdani (Indonesia) Leani Ratri Oktila	(Indonesia) Fredy Setiawan (Indonesia) Khalimatus Sadiyah	(India) Chirag Baretha (India) Mandeep Kaur
SL3-SU5	(Indonesia) Hikmat Ramdani (Indonesia) Leani Ratri Oktila	(Indonesia) Fredy Setiawan (Indonesia) Khalimatus Sadiyah	(India) Pramod Bhagat (India) Manisha Ramdass
SH6	(China) Lin Naili (China) Li Fengmei	(China) Zeng Qingtao (China) Lin Shuangbao	(United States) Miles Krajewski (United States) Jayci Simon
SH6	(China) Lin Naili (China) Li Fengmei	(China) Zeng Qingtao (China) Lin Shuangbao	(Thailand) Natthapong Meechai (Thailand) Chai Saeyang

== Medal table ==
* Host nation (Thailand)

Rank	Nation	Gold	Silver	Bronze	Total
1	China	13	5	5	23
2	Indonesia	3	5	1	9
3	India	3	4	11	18
4	Malaysia	2	1	0	3
5	Japan	1	0	4	5
6	South Korea	0	2	4	6
7	Thailand*	0	2	3	5
8	Peru	0	1	3.5	4.5
9	England	0	1	0	1
9	Hong Kong	0	1	0	1
11	France	0	0	3	3
12	Brazil	0	0	1.5	1.5
12	United States	0	0	1.5	1.5
14	Belgium	0	0	1	1
14	Chinese Taipei	0	0	1	1
14	Denmark	0	0	1	1
14	Norway	0	0	1	1
14	Poland	0	0	1	1
14	Turkey	0	0	1	1
20	Italy	0	0	0.5	0.5
Totals (20 entries)		22	22	44	88

== Results ==
=== Structure ===
Round of 16

Quarter-finals

Semi-finals

Final

=== Men's singles WH1 ===
Round of 16
(South Korea) Choi Jung-man	21	21
(India) Shashank Kumar	11	12
(Japan) Osamu Nagashima	21	11	18
(Japan) Keita Nishimura	13	21	21
(China) Yang Tong	21	21
(France) Stephen Durand	7	6
(South Korea) Lee Sam-seop	21	21
(Vietnam) Manh Giang Hoang	7	10
(Malaysia) Muhammad Ikhwan Ramli	21	21
(France) David Toupe	8	11
(Italy) Yuri Ferrigno	12	11
(China) Qu Zimo	21	21
(Spain) Francisco Motero	6	10
(South Korea) Jeong Jae-gun	21	21
(Israel) Konstantin Afinogenov	16	10
(Germany) Thomas Wandschneider	21	21

Quarter-finals
(South Korea) Choi Jung-man	20	21	21
(Japan) Keita Nishimura	22	15	19
(China) Yang Tong	21	21
(South Korea) Lee Sam-seop	15	13
(Malaysia) Muhammad Ikhwan Ramli	9	7
(China) Qu Zimo	21	21
(South Korea) Jeong Jae-gun	21	22
(Germany) Thomas Wandschneider	15	20

Semi-finals
(South Korea) Choi Jung-man	21	21
(China) Yang Tong	14	16
(China) Qu Zimo	21	21
(South Korea) Jeong Jae-gun	14	4

Final
(South Korea) Choi Jung-man	18	21	15
(China) Qu Zimo	21	19	21

=== Men's Singles WH2 ===
Round of 16
(Japan) Daiki Kajiwara	21	21
(Brazil) Julio Cesar Godoy	13	6
(France) Thomas Jakobs	20	10
(Germany) Rick Hellmann	22	21
(China) Mai Jianpeng	23	21
(India) Sanjeev Kumar	21	11
(Japan) Takumi Matsumoto	21	21
(Italy) Piero Rosario Suma	4	7
(Switzerland) Luca Olgiati	16	8
(South Korea) Yu Soo-young	21	21
(India) Manjunatha Chikkaiah	9	3
(Hong Kong) Chan Ho Yuen	21	21
(Egypt) Mohamed Hassan Farrag	4	5
(China) Zhao Xin	21	21
(Israel) Amir Levi	12	13
(South Korea) Kim Jung-jun	21	21

Quarter-finals
(Japan) Daiki Kajiwara	21	21
(Germany) Rick Hellmann	8	14
(China) Mai Jianpeng	21	21
(Japan) Takumi Matsumoto	13	8
(South Korea) Yu Soo-young	13	21	21
(Hong Kong) Chan Ho Yuen	21	16	10
(China) Zhao Xin	13	13
(South Korea) Kim Jung-jun	21	21

Semi-finals
(Japan) Daiki Kajiwara	21	21
(China) Mai Jianpeng	13	11
(South Korea) Yu Soo-young	21	19	21
(South Korea) Kim Jung-jun	10	21	13

Final
(Japan) Daiki Kajiwara	21	21
(South Korea) Yu Soo-young	16	10

=== Women's Singles WH1 ===
Round of 16
(Japan) Sarina Satomi	21	21
(Poland) Anna Wolny	2	1
(Austria) Henriett Koosz	21	21
(South Korea) Kim Seung-suk	19	15
(Switzerland) Cynthia Mathez	21	21
(Thailand) Piyawan Thinjun	9	6
(China) Yin Menglu	21	21
(China) Fan Chaoyue	10	15
(Canada) Yuka Chokyu	12	9
(Japan) Sena Tomoyose	21	21
(Chinese Taipei) Hu Guang-chiou	10	14
(Thailand) Sujirat Pookkham	21	21
(Poland) Natalia Grzyb	9	8
(Israel) Nina Gorodetzky	21	21
(Brazil) Daniele Torres Souza	9	7
(Belgium) Man-Kei To	21	21

Quarter-finals
(Japan) Sarina Satomi	21	21
(Austria) Henriett Koosz	6	15
(Switzerland) Cynthia Mathez	11	9
(China) Yin Menglu	21	21
(Japan) Sena Tomoyose	13	9
(Thailand) Sujirat Pookkham	21	21
(Israel) Nina Gorodetzky	14	9
(Belgium) Man-Kei To	21	21

Semi-finals
(Japan) Sarina Satomi	12	18
(China) Yin Menglu	21	21
(Thailand) Sujirat Pookkham	21	14	21
(Belgium) Man-Kei To	12	21	11

Final
(China) Yin Menglu	21	21
(Thailand) Sujirat Pookkham	12	15

=== Women's Singles WH2 ===
Round of 16
(Peru) Pilar Jáuregui
Bye
(India) Ruchi Trivedi	19	12
(Australia) Mischa Ginns	21	21
(Japan) Yuma Yamazaki
Bye
(Thailand) Amnouy Wetwithan	21	21
(Germany) Annika Schroeder	3	6
(Turkey) Emine Seçkin	4	9
(China) Liu Yutong	21	21
Bye
(Switzerland) Ilaria Olgiati
(South Korea) Lee Sun-ae	14	11
(South Korea) Jung Gyeoul	21	21
Bye
(China) Li Hongyan

Quarter-finals
(Peru) Pilar Jáuregui	21	21
(Australia) Mischa Ginns	8	4
(Japan) Yuma Yamazaki	19	22	21
(Thailand) Amnouy Wetwithan	21	20	17
(China) Liu Yutong
(Switzerland) Ilaria Olgiati
(South Korea) Jung Gyeoul
(China) Li Hongyan

Semi-finals
(Peru) Pilar Jáuregui
(Japan) Yuma Yamazaki

Final
