= Badminton at the 2024 Summer Paralympics – Women's singles WH1 =

Badminton competition

Women's singles WH1 at the XVII Paralympic Games
- Venue: Arena Porte de La Chapelle, Paris
- Dates: 29 August 2024 – 2 September 2024
- Competitors: 11 from 11 nations

Medalists
1st place, gold medalist(s)		Sarina Satomi	Japan
2nd place, silver medalist(s)		Sujirat Pookkham	Thailand
3rd place, bronze medalist(s)		Yin Menglu	China

The women's singles WH1 tournament at the 2024 Summer Paralympics in France will take place between 29 August and 2 September 2024 at Arena Porte de La Chapelle.

== Classification ==
- WH1
  Players in this class are those who have impairment in both lower limbs and trunk function and require wheelchair to play

== Seeds ==
These were the seeds for this event:

1. Sarina Satomi (JPN) (gold medalist)
2. Sujirat Pookkham (THA) (silver medalist)
3. Man-Kei To (BEL) (fourth place)

== Group stage ==
The draw of the group stage revealed on 24 August 2024. The group stage will be played from 29 to 31 August. The top two winners of each group advanced to the knockout rounds.

=== Group A ===
Pos	Team	Pld	W	L	GF	GA	GD	PF	PA	PD	Pts	Qualification
1	Yin Menglu (CHN)	3	3	0	6	1	+5	138	89	+49	3	Semi-finals
2	Sarina Satomi (JPN)	3	2	1	5	2	+3	138	87	+51	2	Quarter-finals
3	Cynthia Mathez (SUI)	3	1	2	2	4	−2	86	104	−18	1	
4	Nina Gorodetzky (ISR)	3	0	3	0	6	−6	44	126	−82	0	

First match(es) will be played: 29 August 2024. Source: COJOP2024

Date	Time	Player 1	Score	Player 2	Set 1	Set 2	Set 3	Report
Aug 29	16:40	Sarina Satomi (Japan)	1–2	(China) Yin Menglu	21–12	18–21	15–21	
Aug 29	17:20	Cynthia Mathez (Switzerland)	2–0	(Israel) Nina Gorodetzky	21–7	21–13		
Aug 30	16:00	Cynthia Mathez (Switzerland)	0–2	(China) Yin Menglu	9–21	13–21		
Aug 30	16:40	Sarina Satomi (Japan)	2–0	(Israel) Nina Gorodetzky	21–3	21–8		
Aug 31	9:50	Nina Gorodetzky (Israel)	0–2	(China) Yin Menglu	8–21	5–21		
Aug 31	9:50	Sarina Satomi (Japan)	2–0	(Switzerland) Cynthia Mathez	21–11	21–11		

=== Group B ===
Pos	Team	Pld	W	L	GF	GA	GD	PF	PA	PD	Pts	Qualification
1	Man-Kei To (BEL)	2	2	0	4	0	+4	84	35	+49	2	Quarter-finals
2	Kwon Hyun-ah (KOR)	2	1	1	2	2	0	64	72	−8	1	Quarter-finals
3	Henriett Koósz (AUT)	2	0	2	0	4	−4	43	84	−41	0	

First match(es) will be played: 29 August 2024. Source: COJOP2024

Date	Time	Player 1	Score	Player 2	Set 1	Set 2	Set 3	Report
Aug 29	16:00	Henriett Koósz (Austria)	0–2	(South Korea) Kwon Hyun-ah	18–21	12–21		
Aug 30	13:10	Man-Kei To (Belgium)	2–0	(Austria) Henriett Koósz	21–7	21–6		
Aug 31	10:30	Man-Kei To (Belgium)	2–0	(South Korea) Kwon Hyun-ah	21–12	21–10		

=== Group C ===
Pos	Team	Pld	W	L	GF	GA	GD	PF	PA	PD	Pts	Qualification
1	Sujirat Pookkham (THA)	3	3	0	6	0	+6	126	32	+94	3	Semi-finals
2	Hu Guang-chiou (TPE)	3	2	1	4	2	+2	98	94	+4	2	Quarter-finals
3	Daniele Souza (BRA)	3	1	2	2	5	−3	99	128	−29	1	
4	Yuka Chokyu (CAN)	3	0	3	1	6	−5	72	141	−69	0	

First match(es) will be played: 29 August 2024. Source: COJOP2024

Date	Time	Player 1	Score	Player 2	Set 1	Set 2	Set 3	Report
Aug 29	18:00	Yuka Chokyu (Canada)	0–2	(Chinese Taipei) Hu Guang-chiou	12–21	12–21		
Aug 29	18:40	Sujirat Pookkham (Thailand)	2–0	(Brazil) Daniele Souza	21–3	21–11		
Aug 30	12:30	Yuka Chokyu (Canada)	1–2	(Brazil) Daniele Souza	16–21	21–15	7–21	
Aug 30	16:00	Sujirat Pookkham (Thailand)	2–0	(Chinese Taipei) Hu Guang-chiou	21–8	21–6		
Aug 31	10:30	Hu Guang-chiou (Chinese Taipei)	2–0	(Brazil) Daniele Souza	21–17	21–11		
Aug 31		Sujirat Pookkham (Thailand)	2–0	(Canada) Yuka Chokyu	21–3	21–1		

== Finals ==
The knockout stage will be played from 1 to 2 September.

Quarter-finals
B2	Kwon Hyun-ah (KOR)	6	14
B1	Man-Kei To (BEL)	21	21
C2	Hu Guang-chiou (TPE)	5	11
A2	Sarina Satomi (JPN)	21	21

Semi-finals
C1	Sujirat Pookkham (THA)	21	21
B1	Man-Kei To (BEL)	13	15
A2	Sarina Satomi (JPN)	21	22
A1	Yin Menglu (CHN)	17	20

Gold medal match
C1	Sujirat Pookkham (THA) (silver)	21	13	18
A2	Sarina Satomi (JPN) (gold)	18	21	21
Bronze medal match
B1	Man-Kei To (BEL)	9	9
A1	Yin Menglu (CHN) (bronze)	21	21
