= Badminton at the 2020 Summer Paralympics – Women's doubles WH1–WH2 =

Women's doubles WH1–WH2 at the XVI Paralympic Games
- Venue: Yoyogi National Gymnasium
- Dates: 2–5 September 2021
- Competitors: 12 from 6 nations

Medalists
1st place, gold medalist(s)		Sarina Satomi; Yuma Yamazaki	Japan
2nd place, silver medalist(s)		Liu Yutong; Yin Menglu	China
3rd place, bronze medalist(s)		Sujirat Pookkham; Amnouy Wetwithan	Thailand

The women's doubles WH1–WH2 tournament at the 2020 Summer Paralympics in Tokyo took place between 2 and 5 September 2021 at Yoyogi National Gymnasium.

== Seeds ==
These were the seeds for this event:

1. Sarina Satomi / Yuma Yamazaki (JPN) (gold medalists)
2. Liu Yutong / Yin Menglu (CHN) (silver medalists)

== Group stage ==
The draw of the group stage revealed on 26 August 2021. The group stage was played from 2 to 3 September. The top two winners of each group advanced to the knockout rounds.

=== Group A ===
Pos	Team	Pld	W	L	GF	GA	GD	PF	PA	PD	Pts	Qualification
1	Sarina Satomi (JPN) (WH1) Yuma Yamazaki (JPN) (WH2) (H)	2	2	0	4	0	+4	84	42	+42	2	Advance to semi-finals
2	Sujirat Pookkham (THA) (WH1) Amnouy Wetwithan (THA) (WH2)	2	1	1	2	2	0	67	67	0	1	Advance to semi-finals
3	Kang Jung-kum (KOR) (WH1) Lee Sun-ae (KOR) (WH2)	2	0	2	0	4	−4	42	84	−42	0	

Source: TOCOG
(H) Host

Date	Time	Player 1	Score	Player 2	Set 1	Set 2	Set 3
2 Sep	09:00	Sarina Satomi (Japan); Yuma Yamazaki (Japan)	2–0	(South Korea) Kang Jung-kum (South Korea) Lee Sun-ae	21–12	21–5	
2 Sep	16:40	Sujirat Pookkham (Thailand); Amnouy Wetwithan (Thailand)	2–0	(South Korea) Kang Jung-kum (South Korea) Lee Sun-ae	21–9	21–16	
3 Sep	13:40	Sarina Satomi (Japan); Yuma Yamazaki (Japan)	2–0	(Thailand) Sujirat Pookkham (Thailand) Amnouy Wetwithan	21–16	21–9	

=== Group B ===
Pos	Team	Pld	W	L	GF	GA	GD	PF	PA	PD	Pts	Qualification
1	Liu Yutong (CHN) (WH2) Yin Menglu (CHN) (WH1)	2	2	0	4	0	+4	84	24	+60	2	Advance to semi-finals
2	Cynthia Mathez (SUI) (WH1) Karin Suter-Erath (SUI) (WH1)	2	1	1	2	2	0	55	64	−9	1	Advance to semi-finals
3	Valeska Knoblauch (GER) (WH1) Elke Rongen (GER) (WH1)	2	0	2	0	4	−4	33	84	−51	0	

Source: TOCOG

Date	Time	Player 1	Score	Player 2	Set 1	Set 2	Set 3
2 Sep	09:00	Liu Yutong (China); Yin Menglu (China)	2–0	(Germany) Valeska Knoblauch (Germany) Elke Rongen	21–3	21–8	
2 Sep	16:40	Cynthia Mathez (Switzerland); Karin Suter-Erath (Switzerland)	2–0	(Germany) Valeska Knoblauch (Germany) Elke Rongen	21–11	21–11	
3 Sep	13:40	Liu Yutong (China); Yin Menglu (China)	2–0	(Switzerland) Cynthia Mathez (Switzerland) Karin Suter-Erath	21–4	21–9	

== Finals ==
The knockout stage was played from 4 to 5 September.

Semi-finals
A1	Sarina Satomi (JPN); Yuma Yamazaki (JPN)	21	21
A2	Sujirat Pookkham (THA); Amnouy Wetwithan (THA)	17	16
B2	Cynthia Mathez (SUI); Karin Suter-Erath (SUI)	10	13
B1	Liu Yutong (CHN); Yin Menglu (CHN)	21	21

Gold medal match
A1	Sarina Satomi (JPN); Yuma Yamazaki (JPN) (gold)	16	21	21
B1	Liu Yutong (CHN); Yin Menglu (CHN) (silver)	21	16	13
Bronze medal match
A2	Sujirat Pookkham (THA); Amnouy Wetwithan (THA) (bronze)	21	21
B2	Cynthia Mathez (SUI); Karin Suter-Erath (SUI)	17	12
