= Amnouy Wetwithan =

Thai para-badminton player

Personal information
- Born: 18 July 1979 (age 47) Suphan Buri, Thailand

Sport
- Country: Thailand
- Sport: Badminton
- Coached by: Apinop Arayacharoen

Women's singles WH2 Women's doubles WH1–WH2 Mixed doubles WH1–WH2
- Highest ranking: 3 (WS 1 January 2019); 1 (WD with Sujirat Pookkham 1 January 2019); 1 (XD with Jakarin Homhual 1 January 2019)
- Current ranking: 9 (WS); 12 (WD with Sujirat Pookkham); 11 (XD with Chatchai Kornpeekanok) (8 November 2022)
- BWF profile
Medal record
Para-badminton
Representing Thailand
Paralympic Games
| Bronze medal – third place | 2020 Tokyo | Women's doubles |
| Bronze medal – third place | 2024 Paris | Women's doubles |
World Championships
| Gold medal – first place | 2009 Seoul | Women's singles |
| Gold medal – first place | 2009 Seoul | Mixed doubles |
| Gold medal – first place | 2015 Stoke Mandeville | Women's singles |
| Gold medal – first place | 2015 Stoke Mandeville | Women's doubles |
| Gold medal – first place | 2017 Ulsan | Mixed doubles |
| Silver medal – second place | 2009 Seoul | Women's doubles |
| Silver medal – second place | 2015 Stoke Mandeville | Mixed doubles |
| Silver medal – second place | 2017 Ulsan | Women's doubles |
| Silver medal – second place | 2019 Basel | Women's doubles |
| Silver medal – second place | 2019 Basel | Mixed doubles |
| Bronze medal – third place | 2007 Bangkok | Women's doubles |
| Bronze medal – third place | 2017 Ulsan | Women's singles |
| Bronze medal – third place | 2024 Pattaya | Women's doubles |
Asian Para Games
| Gold medal – first place | 2010 Guangzhou | Women's singles |
| Gold medal – first place | 2014 Incheon | Mixed doubles |
| Silver medal – second place | 2014 Incheon | Women's singles |
| Silver medal – second place | 2014 Incheon | Women's doubles |
| Silver medal – second place | 2018 Jakarta | Women's doubles |
| Bronze medal – third place | 2018 Jakarta | Women's singles |
| Bronze medal – third place | 2022 Hangzhou | Women's singles |
| Bronze medal – third place | 2022 Hangzhou | Women's doubles |
| Bronze medal – third place | 2022 Hangzhou | Mixed doubles |
Asian Championships
| Gold medal – first place | 2016 Beijing | Mixed doubles |
| Silver medal – second place | 2016 Beijing | Women's singles |
| Silver medal – second place | 2016 Beijing | Women's doubles |
ASEAN Para Games
| Gold medal – first place | 2011 Surakarta | Women's singles |
| Gold medal – first place | 2015 Singapore | Women's singles |
| Gold medal – first place | 2017 Kuala Lumpur | Women's singles |
| Gold medal – first place | 2022 Surakarta | Women's singles |
| Gold medal – first place | 2022 Surakarta | Mixed doubles |

Amnouy Wetwithan (Thai: อำนวย เวชวิฐาน; born 18 July 1979) is a Thai para-badminton player who competes in international elite competitions. Amnouy competed for Thailand at the 2020 Summer Paralympics and won a bronze medal in the women's doubles WH1–WH2 event.

== Achievements ==
=== Paralympic Games ===
Women's doubles

| Year | Venue | Partner | Opponent | Score | Result |
|---|---|---|---|---|---|
| 2020 | Yoyogi National Gymnasium, Tokyo, Japan | (Thailand) Sujirat Pookkham | (Switzerland) Cynthia Mathez (Switzerland) Karin Suter-Erath | 21–17, 21–12 | Bronze |

=== World Championships ===
Women's singles

| Year | Venue | Opponent | Score | Result |
|---|---|---|---|---|
| 2009 (Note: This tournament uses a round robin system.) | Fencing Hall, Seoul, South Korea | (South Korea) Kim Yun-sim | 22–20, 21–19 | Gold |
| 2009 | Fencing Hall, Seoul, South Korea | (Israel) Shulamit Dahan | 21–6, 21–6 | Gold |
| 2009 | Fencing Hall, Seoul, South Korea | (South Korea) Lee Sun-ae | 20–22, 21–17, 21–19 | Gold |
| 2009 | Fencing Hall, Seoul, South Korea | (Netherlands) Anneke Wansink Lingen | 21–10, 21–16 | Gold |
| 2015 | Stoke Mandeville Stadium, Stoke Mandeville, England | (South Korea) Lee Sun-ae | 21–14, 21–12 | Gold |
| 2017 | Dongchun Gymnasium, Ulsan, South Korea | (China) Xu Tingting | 13–21, 21–17, 21–23 | Bronze |

Women’s doubles
| Year | Venue | Partner | Opponent | Score | Result |
|---|---|---|---|---|---|
| 2009 | Fencing Hall, Seoul, South Korea | (Thailand) Sujirat Pookkham | (South Korea) Lee Sun-ae (South Korea) Kim Yeon-sim | 18–21, 10–21 | Silver |
| 2015 | Stoke Mandeville Stadium; Stoke Mandeville, England | (Thailand) Sujirat Pookkham | (South Korea) Kang Jung-kum (South Korea) Kim Yun-sim | 21–8, 21–14 | Gold |
| 2017 | Dongchun Gymnasium; Ulsan, South Korea | (Thailand) Sujirat Pookkham | (China) Li Hongyan (China) Yang Fan | 11–21, 13–21 | Silver |
| 2019 | St. Jakobshalle; Basel, Switzerland | (Thailand) Sujirat Pookkham | (China) Liu Yutong (China) Yin Menglu | 11–21, 15–21 | Silver |
| 2024 | Pattaya Exhibition and Convention Hall; Pattaya, Thailand | (Thailand) Sujirat Pookkham | (China) Fan Chaoyue (China) Li Hongyan | 19–21, 21–15, 12–21 | Bronze |

Mixed doubles
| Year | Venue | Partner | Opponent | Score | Result |
|---|---|---|---|---|---|
| 2009 | Fencing Hall, Seoul, South Korea | (Thailand) Dumnern Junthong | (South Korea) Kim Sung-hun (South Korea) Lee Sun-ae | 21–12, 21–16 | Gold |
| 2015 | Stoke Mandeville Stadium; Stoke Mandeville, England | (Thailand) Jakarin Homhual | (South Korea) Lee Sam-seop (South Korea) Kim Yun-sim | 21–23, 17–21 | Silver |
| 2017 | Dongchun Gymnasium; Ulsan, South Korea | (Thailand) Jakarin Homhual | (South Korea) Lee Sam-seop (South Korea) Lee Sun-ae | 21–14, 19–21, 21–18 | Gold |
| 2019 | St. Jakobshalle, Basel, Switzerland | (Thailand) Jakarin Homhual | (China) Yang Tong (China) Li Hongyan | 15–21, 21–19, 16–21 | Silver |

=== Asian Para Games ===
Women's singles

| Year | Venue | Opponent | Score | Result |
|---|---|---|---|---|
| 2010 (Note: This tournament uses a round robin system.) | Tianhe Gymnasium, Guangzhou, China | (Thailand) Sujirat Pookkham | 21–9, 21–12 | Gold |
| 2010 | Tianhe Gymnasium, Guangzhou, China | (Japan) Rie Ogura | 21–8, 21–5 | Gold |
| 2010 | Tianhe Gymnasium, Guangzhou, China | (South Korea) Lee Sun-ae | 21–18, 21–17 | Gold |
| 2014 | Gyeyang Gymnasium, Incheon, South Korea | (South Korea) Lee Sun-ae | 14–21, 19–21 | Silver |
| 2018 | Istora Gelora Bung Karno, Jakarta, Indonesia | (China) Liu Yutong | 16–21, 10–21 | Bronze |

Women’s doubles

| Year | Venue | Partner | Opponent | Score | Result |
|---|---|---|---|---|---|
| 2014 (Note: This tournament uses a round robin system.) | Gyeyang Gymnasium, Incheon, South Korea | (Thailand) Sujirat Pookkham | (Japan) Rie Ogura (Japan) Midori Shimada | 21–11, 21–5 | Silver |
| 2014 | Gyeyang Gymnasium, Incheon, South Korea | (Thailand) Sujirat Pookkham | (South Korea) Kim Yun-sim (South Korea) Lee Mi-ok | 16–21, 21–13, 18–21 | Silver |
| 2014 | Gyeyang Gymnasium, Incheon, South Korea | (Thailand) Sujirat Pookkham | (South Korea) Lee Sun-ae (South Korea) Son Ok-cha | 21–9, 23–25, 21–14 | Silver |
| 2018 | Istora Gelora Bung Karno, Jakarta, Indonesia | (Thailand) Sujirat Pookkham | (China) Li Hongyan (China) Xu Tingting | 17–21, 21–11, 13–21 | Silver |

Mixed doubles
| Year | Venue | Partner | Opponent | Score | Result |
|---|---|---|---|---|---|
| 2014 | Gyeyang Gymnasium; Incheon, South Korea | (Thailand) Jakarin Homhual | (South Korea) Lee Sam-seop (South Korea) Lee Sun-ae | 21–16, 21–15 | Gold |

=== Asian Championships ===
Women's singles
| Year | Venue | Opponent | Score | Result |
|---|---|---|---|---|
| 2016 | China Administration of Sport for Persons with Disabilities; Beijing, China | (China) Liu Yutong | 16–21, 11–21 | Silver |

Women's doubles
| Year | Venue | Partner | Opponent | Score | Result |
|---|---|---|---|---|---|
| 2016 | China Administration of Sport for Persons with Disabilities; Beijing, China | (Thailand) Sujirat Pookkham | (China) Li Hongyan (China) Yang Fan | 16–21, 14–21 | Silver |

Mixed doubles
| Year | Venue | Partner | Opponent | Score | Result |
|---|---|---|---|---|---|
| 2016 | China Administration of Sport for Persons with Disabilities; Beijing, China | (Thailand) Jakarin Homhual | (South Korea) Lee Dong-seop (South Korea) Lee Sun-ae | 21–17, 20–22, 23–25 | Gold |

=== ASEAN Para Games ===
Women's singles

| Year | Venue | Opponent | Score | Result |
|---|---|---|---|---|
| 2011 | Sritex Sports Arena, Surakarta, Indonesia | (Thailand) Sujirat Pookkham | 21–13, 21–15 | Gold |
| 2015 | OCBC Arena, Singapore | (Thailand) Sujirat Pookkham | 21–8, 21–14 | Gold |
| 2017 (Note: This tournament uses a round robin system.) | Axiata Arena, Kuala Lumpur, Malaysia | (Philippines) Imelda Isidro Legazpi | 21–10, 21–2 | Gold |
| 2017 | Axiata Arena, Kuala Lumpur, Malaysia | (Thailand) Piyawan Thinjun | 21–12, 21–12 | Gold |
| 2017 | Axiata Arena, Kuala Lumpur, Malaysia | (Philippines) Lita Paz Enano | 21–4, 21–4 | Gold |
| 2017 | Axiata Arena, Kuala Lumpur, Malaysia | (Thailand) Sujirat Pookkham | 19–21, 21–15, 21–10 | Gold |
| 2022 (Note: This tournament uses a round robin system.) | Edutorium Muhammadiyah University of Surakarta, Surakarta, Indonesia | (Philippines) Lita Paz Enano | 21–8, 21–2 | Gold |
| 2022 | Edutorium Muhammadiyah University of Surakarta, Surakarta, Indonesia | (Vietnam) Lê Thị Thu Hiền | 21–5, 21–2 | Gold |
| 2022 | Edutorium Muhammadiyah University of Surakarta, Surakarta, Indonesia | (Vietnam) Hoàng Thị Hồng Thảo | 21–4, 21–5 | Gold |

Mixed doubles

| Year | Venue | Partner | Opponent | Score | Result |
|---|---|---|---|---|---|
| 2022 (Note: This tournament uses a round robin system.) | Edutorium Muhammadiyah University of Surakarta, Surakarta, Indonesia | (Thailand) Chatchai Kornpeekanok | (Thailand) Dumnern Junthong (Thailand) Piyawan Thinjun | 21–13, 21–7 | Gold |
| 2022 | Edutorium Muhammadiyah University of Surakarta, Surakarta, Indonesia | (Thailand) Chatchai Kornpeekanok | (Philippines) Jestonie Librado Rosalita (Philippines) Lita Paz Enano | 21–9, 21–11 | Gold |
| 2022 | Edutorium Muhammadiyah University of Surakarta, Surakarta, Indonesia | (Thailand) Chatchai Kornpeekanok | (Vietnam) Hoàng Mạnh Giang (Vietnam) Hoàng Thị Hồng Thảo | 21–5, 21–9 | Gold |
| 2022 | Edutorium Muhammadiyah University of Surakarta, Surakarta, Indonesia | (Thailand) Chatchai Kornpeekanok | (Philippines) Joseph Garbo Asoque (Philippines) Violeta Kitongan Sapalit | 21–4, 21–1 | Gold |

=== BWF Para Badminton World Circuit (2 runners-up) ===
The BWF Para Badminton World Circuit – Grade 2, Level 1, 2 and 3 tournaments has been sanctioned by the Badminton World Federation from 2022.

Women's singles
| Year | Tournament | Level | Opponent | Score | Result |
|---|---|---|---|---|---|
| 2022 | Bahrain Para Badminton International | Level 2 | (Japan) Yuma Yamazaki | 8–21, 11–21 | (silver) Runner-up |

Mixed doubles
| Year | Tournament | Level | Partner | Opponent | Score | Result |
|---|---|---|---|---|---|---|
| 2022 | Bahrain Para Badminton International | Level 2 | (Thailand) Chatchai Kornpeekanok | (South Korea) Yu Soo-young (South Korea) Kwon Hyun-ah | 21–17, 16–21, 13–21 | (silver) Runner-up |

=== International Tournaments (17 titles, 9 runners-up) ===
Women's singles
| Year | Tournament | Opponent | Score | Result |
|---|---|---|---|---|
| 2015 | Indonesia Para Badminton International | (Turkey) Emine Seçkin | 13–21, 18–21 | (silver) Runner-up |
| 2016 | Indonesia Para Badminton International | (Thailand) Sujirat Pookkham | 13–21, 21–17, 21–17 | (gold) Winner |
| 2017 | Thailand Para Badminton International | (South Korea) Kim Yun-sim | 21–4, 21–14 | (gold) Winner |
| 2017 | Irish Para Badminton International | (Spain) Esther Torres | 21–4, 21–9 | (gold) Winner |
| 2017 | Japan Para Badminton International | (Japan) Yuma Yamazaki | 22–20, 18–21, 18–21 | (silver) Runner-up |
| 2018 | Spanish Para Badminton International | (Japan) Yuma Yamazaki | 16–21, 21–13, 14–21 | (silver) Runner-up |
| 2018 | Turkish Para Badminton International | (Japan) Yuma Yamazaki | 13–21, 13–21 | (silver) Runner-up |
| 2018 | Thailand Para Badminton International | (Japan) Yuma Yamazaki | 22–20, 17–21, 20–22 | (silver) Runner-up |
| 2019 | Irish Para Badminton International | (Japan) Yuma Yamazaki | 21–19, 12–21, 21–9 | (gold) Winner |
| 2019 | Thailand Para Badminton International | (Turkey) Emine Seçkin | 21–16, 21–17 | (gold) Winner |
| 2021 | Spanish Para Badminton International | (Russia) Tatiana Gureeva | 21–12, 21–12 | (gold) Winner |

Women's doubles

| Year | Tournament | Partner | Opponent | Score | Result |
|---|---|---|---|---|---|
| 2017 | Thailand Para Badminton International | (Thailand) Sujirat Pookkham | (South Korea) Kim Yun-sim (South Korea) Son Ok-cha | 21–18, 21–13 | (gold) Winner |
| 2017 | Irish Para Badminton International | (Thailand) Sujirat Pookkham | (Switzerland) Cynthia Mathez (Switzerland) Karin Suter-Erath | 21–8, 21–10 | (gold) Winner |
| 2017 | Japan Para Badminton International | (Thailand) Sujirat Pookkham | (Germany) Valeska Knoblauch (Germany) Elke Rongen | 21–10, 21–6 | (gold) Winner |
| 2018 | Spanish Para Badminton International | (Thailand) Sujirat Pookkham | (Japan) Ikumi Fuke (Japan) Yuma Yamazaki | 21–11, 21–11 | (gold) Winner |
| 2018 (Note: This tournament uses a round robin system.) | Turkish Para Badminton International | (Thailand) Sujirat Pookkham | (Japan) Rie Ogura (Switzerland) Karin Suter-Erath | 12–21, 21–13, 21–13 | (gold) Winner |
| 2018 | Turkish Para Badminton International | (Thailand) Sujirat Pookkham | (Japan) Etsuko Kobayashi (Japan) Yuma Yamazaki | 21–6, 21–8 | (gold) Winner |
| 2018 | Turkish Para Badminton International | (Thailand) Sujirat Pookkham | (Austria) Henriett Koósz (Spain) Marcela Quinteros | 21–16, 21–9 | (gold) Winner |
| 2018 | Turkish Para Badminton International | (Thailand) Sujirat Pookkham | (Russia) Irina Kuzmenko (Turkey) Narin Uluç | 21–15, 21–12 | (gold) Winner |
| 2018 | Thailand Para Badminton International | (Thailand) Sujirat Pookkham | (Japan) Sarina Satomi (Japan) Yuma Yamazaki | 21–16, 21–13 | (gold) Winner |
| 2019 | Thailand Para Badminton International | (Thailand) Sujirat Pookkham | (Japan) Rie Ogura (Japan) Ikumi Fuke | 21–10, 21–12 | (gold) Winner |
| 2019 | Denmark Para Badminton International | (Thailand) Sujirat Pookkham | (Japan) Sarina Satomi (Japan) Yuma Yamazaki | 18–21, 16–21 | (silver) Runner-up |
| 2021 | Spanish Para Badminton International | (Thailand) Sujirat Pookkham | (South Korea) Kang Jung-kum (South Korea) Lee Sun-ae | 21–12, 21–5 | (gold) Winner |

Mixed doubles
| Year | Tournament | Partner | Opponent | Score | Result |
|---|---|---|---|---|---|
| 2015 | Indonesia Para Badminton International | (Thailand) Jakarin Homhual | (Hong Kong) Chan Ho Yuen (Switzerland) Karin Suter-Erath | 19–21, 21–11, 23–21 | (gold) Winner |
| 2016 | Indonesia Para Badminton International | (Thailand) Jakarin Homhual | (Thailand) Dumnern Junthong (Thailand) Sujirat Pookkham | 21–14, 26–28, 21–17 | (gold) Winner |
| 2017 | Irish Para Badminton International | (Thailand) Jakarin Homhual | (Thailand) Dumnern Junthong (Thailand) Sujirat Pookkham | 21–9, 22–20 | (gold) Winner |
| 2017 | Japan Para Badminton International | (Thailand) Jakarin Homhual | (South Korea) Kim Jung-jun (South Korea) Kim Seung-suk | 15–21, 22–24 | (silver) Runner-up |
| 2018 | Spanish Para Badminton International | (Thailand) Jakarin Homhual | (Japan) Osamu Nagashima (Japan) Yuma Yamazaki | 21–17, 20–22, 17–21 | (silver) Runner-up |
| 2018 | Turkish Para Badminton International | (Thailand) Jakarin Homhual | (Japan) Osamu Nagashima (Japan) Yuma Yamazaki | 9–21, 16–21 | (silver) Runner-up |
