= Badminton at the 2024 Summer Paralympics – Women's doubles WH1–WH2 =

Badminton competition

Women's doubles WH1–WH2 at the XVII Paralympic Games
- Venue: Arena Porte de La Chapelle, Paris
- Dates: 29 August 2024 – 1 September 2024
- Competitors: 12 from 6 nations

Medalists
1st place, gold medalist(s)		Liu Yutong; Yin Menglu	China
2nd place, silver medalist(s)		Sarina Satomi; Yuma Yamazaki	Japan
3rd place, bronze medalist(s)		Sujirat Pookkham; Amnouy Wetwithan	Thailand

The women's doubles WH1–WH2 tournament at the 2024 Summer Paralympics in France will take place between 29 August and 1 September 2024 at Arena Porte de La Chapelle.

== Classification ==
- WH1
  Players in this class are those who have impairment in both lower limbs and trunk function and require wheelchair to play
- WH2
  Players have impairment in one or both lower limbs and minimal or no impairment of the trunk and also require wheelchair

== Seeds ==
These were the seeds for this event:

1. Liu Yutong / Yin Menglu (CHN) (champions, gold medalists)
2. Cynthia Mathez / Ilaria Renggli (SUI) (semifinals)

== Group stage ==
The draw of the group stage revealed on 24 August 2024. The group stage will be played from 29 to 30 August. The top two winners of each group advanced to the knockout rounds.

=== Group A ===
Pos	Team	Pld	W	L	GF	GA	GD	PF	PA	PD	Pts	Qualification
1	Liu Yutong (CHN) [WH2] Yin Menglu (CHN) [WH1]	2	2	0	4	0	+4	84	47	+37	2	Semi-finals
2	Sarina Satomi (JPN) [WH1] Yuma Yamazaki (JPN) [WH2]	2	1	1	2	2	0	70	63	+7	1	Semi-finals
3	Jung Gye-oul (KOR) [WH2] Kwon Hyun-ah (KOR) [WH1]	2	0	2	0	4	−4	40	84	−44	0	

Updated to match(es) played on 29 August 2024. Source: COJOP2024

Date	Time	Player 1	Score	Player 2	Set 1	Set 2	Set 3	Report
Aug 29	8:30	Jung Gye-oul (South Korea); Kwon Hyun-ah (South Korea)	0–2	(Japan) Sarina Satomi (Japan) Yuma Yamazaki	9–21	12–21		Report
Aug 30	11:10	Liu Yutong (China); Yin Menglu (China)	2–0	(Japan) Sarina Satomi (Japan) Yuma Yamazaki	21–14	21–14		Report
Aug 30	20:00	Liu Yutong (China); Yin Menglu (China)	2–0	(South Korea) Jung Gye-oul (South Korea) Kwon Hyun-ah	21–11	21–8		Report

=== Group B ===
Pos	Team	Pld	W	L	GF	GA	GD	PF	PA	PD	Pts	Qualification
1	Sujirat Pookkham (THA) [WH1] Amnouy Wetwithan (THA) [WH2]	2	2	0	4	1	+3	109	84	+25	2	Semi-finals
2	Cynthia Mathez (SUI) [WH1] Ilaria Renggli (SUI) [WH2]	2	1	1	3	2	+1	107	96	+11	1	Semi-finals
3	Hu Guang-chiou (TPE) [WH1] Yang I-chen (TPE) [WH2]	2	0	2	0	4	−4	48	84	−36	0	

Updated to match(es) played on 29 August 2024. Source: COJOP2024

Date	Time	Player 1	Score	Player 2	Set 1	Set 2	Set 3	Report
Aug 29	9:10	Cynthia Mathez (Switzerland); Ilaria Renggli (Switzerland)	2–0	(Chinese Taipei) Hu Guang-chiou (Chinese Taipei) Yang I-chen	21–10	21–19		Report
Aug 30	11:10	Cynthia Mathez (Switzerland); Ilaria Renggli (Switzerland)	1–2	(Thailand) Sujirat Pookkham (Thailand) Amnouy Wetwithan	25–23	21–23	19–21	Report
Aug 30	20:40	Hu Guang-chiou (Chinese Taipei); Yang I-chen (Chinese Taipei)	0–2	(Thailand) Sujirat Pookkham (Thailand) Amnouy Wetwithan	8–21	11–21		Report

== Finals ==
The knockout stage will be played from 31 August to 1 September.

Semi-finals
B1	Liu Yutong (CHN); Yin Menglu (CHN)	21	21	-
A2	Cynthia Mathez (SUI); Ilaria Renggli (SUI)	6	15	-
B2	Sarina Satomi (JPN); Yuma Yamazaki (JPN)	21	21	-
A1	Sujirat Pookkham (THA); Amnouy Wetwithan (THA)	16	13	-

Gold medal match
B1	Liu Yutong (CHN) (gold); Yin Menglu (CHN)	21	21	-
B2	Sarina Satomi (JPN) (silver); Yuma Yamazaki (JPN)	17	19	-
Bronze medal match
A2	Cynthia Mathez (SUI); Ilaria Renggli (SUI)	20	25	-
A1	Sujirat Pookkham (THA) (bronze); Amnouy Wetwithan (THA)	22	27	-
