= Sarina Satomi =

Japanese para-badminton player

Sarina Satomi 里見 紗李奈
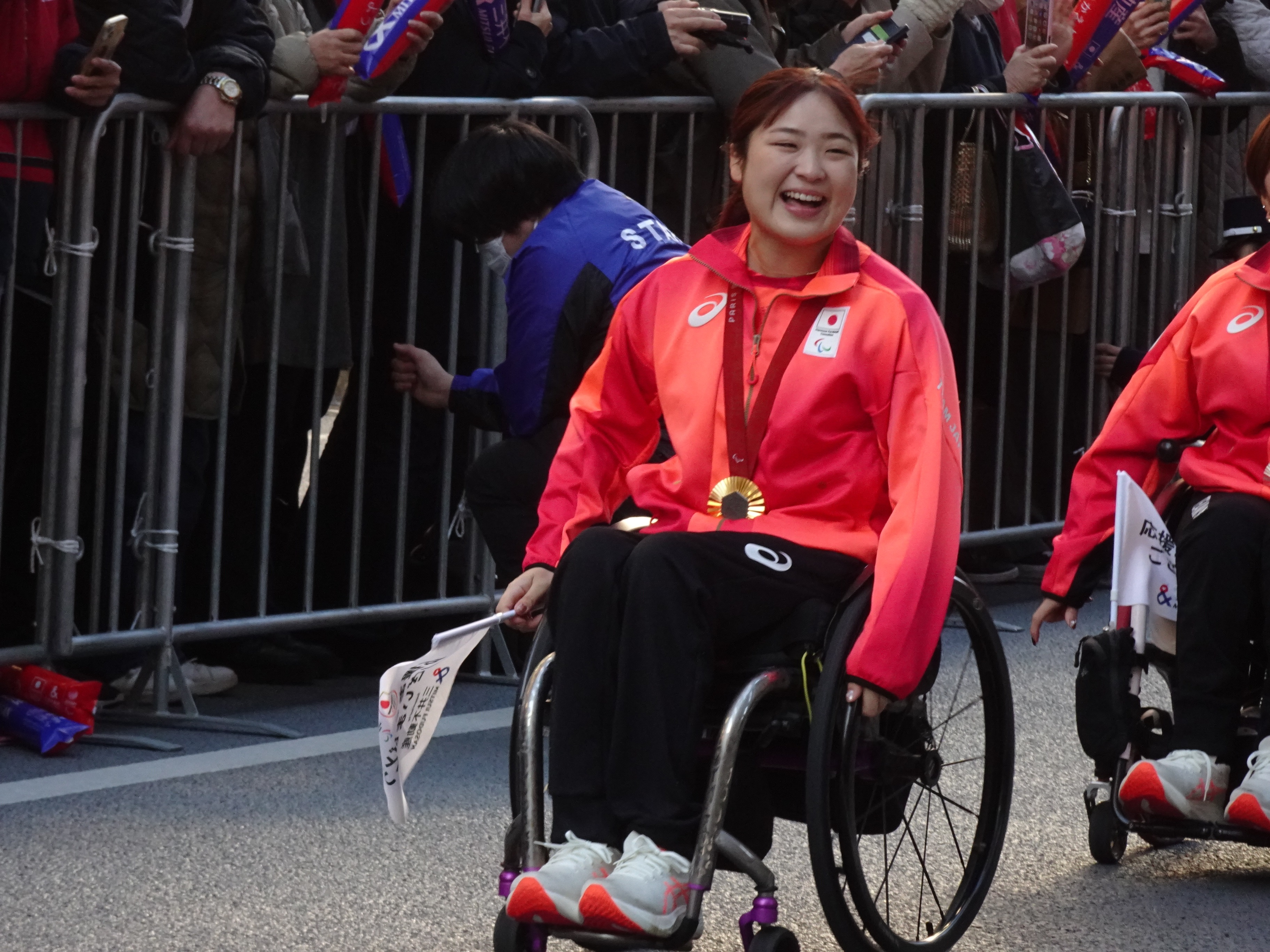
- Sarina Satomi at Paris 2024 Summer Olympians and Paralympians Japan National Team parade event on November 30th, 2024

Personal information
- Born: 9 April 1998 (age 28) Chiba, Chiba Prefecture, Japan
- Height: 160 cm (5 ft 3 in)

Sport
- Country: Japan
- Sport: Badminton

Women's singles WH1 Women's doubles WH1–WH2
- Highest ranking: 1 (WS 29 August 2019); 1 (WD with Yuma Yamazaki 16 May 2019)
- Current ranking: 1 (WS); 1 (WD with Yuma Yamazaki) (8 November 2022)
- BWF profile
Medal record
Para-badminton
Representing Japan
Paralympic Games
Gold medal – first place	2020 Tokyo	Women's singles
Gold medal – first place	2020 Tokyo	Women's doubles
Gold medal – first place	2024 Paris	Women's singles
Silver medal – second place	2024 Paris	Women's doubles
World Championships
Gold medal – first place	2019 Basel	Women's singles
Gold medal – first place	2022 Tokyo	Women's singles
Gold medal – first place	2022 Tokyo	Women's doubles
Gold medal – first place	2026 Manama	Women's singles
Bronze medal – third place	2019 Basel	Women's doubles
Bronze medal – third place	2024 Pattaya	Women's singles
Bronze medal – third place	2024 Pattaya	Women's doubles
Asian Para Games
Gold medal – first place	2022 Hangzhou	Women's singles
Silver medal – second place	2022 Hangzhou	Women's doubles
Bronze medal – third place	2018 Jakarta	Women's singles

Sarina Satomi (里見 紗李奈, Satomi Sarina; born 9 April 1998) is a Japanese para-badminton player who competes in international elite competitions. She competed at the 2020 Summer Paralympics and won gold medals in women's singles WH1, and women's doubles WH1–WH2 events.

She is twice a World women's singles champion and a world champion in the doubles with teammate Yuma Yamazaki.

== Life ==
Satomi sustained a spinal cord injury when she was involved in a car accident in May 2016.

== Achievements ==
=== Paralympic Games ===
Women's singles WH1

Year	Venue	Opponent	Score	Result
2020	Yoyogi National Gymnasium, Tokyo, Japan	(Thailand) Sujirat Pookkham	14–21, 21–19, 21–13	Gold
2024	Porte de La Chapelle Arena, Paris, France	(Thailand) Sujirat Pookkham	18–21, 21–13, 21–18	Gold

Women's doubles WH1–WH2

Year	Venue	Partner	Opponent	Score	Result
2020	Yoyogi National Gymnasium, Tokyo, Japan	(Japan) Yuma Yamazaki	(China) Liu Yutong (China) Yin Menglu	16–21, 21–16, 21–13	Gold
2024	Porte de La Chapelle Arena, Paris, France	(Japan) Yuma Yamazaki	(China) Liu Yutong (China) Yin Menglu	17–21, 19–21	Silver

=== World Championships ===
Women's singles WH1
Year	Venue	Opponent	Score	Result
2019	St. Jakobshalle; Basel, Switzerland	(Thailand) Sujirat Pookkham	21–16, 21–15	Gold
2022	Yoyogi National Gymnasium; Tokyo, Japan	(Switzerland) Cynthia Mathez	21–9, 21–10	Gold
2024	Pattaya Exhibition and Convention Hall; Pattaya, Thailand	(China) Yin Menglu	12–21, 18–21	Bronze

Women's doubles WH1–WH2
Year	Venue	Partner	Opponent	Score	Result
2019	St. Jakobshalle; Basel, Switzerland	(Japan) Yuma Yamazaki	(China) Liu Yutong (China) Yin Menglu	Walkover	Bronze
2022	Yoyogi National Gymnasium; Tokyo, Japan	(Japan) Yuma Yamazaki	(Turkey) Emine Seçkin (Belgium) To Man-kei	21–11, 21–15	Gold
2024	Pattaya Exhibition and Convention Hall; Pattaya, Thailand	(Japan) Yuma Yamazaki	(China) Liu Yutong (China) Yin Menglu	7–21, 17–21	Bronze

=== Asian Para Games ===
Women's singles WH1
Year	Venue	Opponent	Score	Result
2018	Istora Gelora Bung Karno; Jakarta, Indonesia	(China) Li Hongyan	6–21, 9–21	Bronze
2022	Binjiang Gymnasium; Hangzhou, China	(Thailand) Sujirat Pookkham	21–15, 21–19	Gold

Women's doubles WH1–WH2

Year	Venue	Partner	Opponent	Score	Result
2022 (Note: This tournament uses a round robin system.)	Binjiang Gymnasium, Hangzhou, China	(Japan) Yuma Yamazaki	(China) Liu Yutong (China) Yin Menglu	10–21, 17–12	Silver
2022	Binjiang Gymnasium, Hangzhou, China	(Japan) Yuma Yamazaki	(Thailand) Sujirat Pookkham (Thailand) Amnouy Wetwithan	21–16, 12–21, 21–17	Silver
2022	Binjiang Gymnasium, Hangzhou, China	(Japan) Yuma Yamazaki	(Chinese Taipei) Hu Guang-chiou (Chinese Taipei) Yang I-chen	21–9, 21–9	Silver
2022	Binjiang Gymnasium, Hangzhou, China	(Japan) Yuma Yamazaki	(South Korea) Jung Gyeoul (South Korea) Kwon Hyunah	21–8, 21–11	Silver

=== BWF Para Badminton World Circuit (19 titles, 2 runners-up) ===
The BWF Para Badminton World Circuit – Grade 2, Level 1, 2 and 3 tournaments has been sanctioned by the Badminton World Federation from 2022.

Women's singles WH1
Year	Tournament	Level	Opponent	Score	Result
2022	Bahrain Para-Badminton International	Level 2	(Switzerland) Cynthia Mathez	21–12, 21–9	(gold) Winner
2022	4 Nations Para-Badminton International	Level 1	(Switzerland) Cynthia Mathez	21–10, 21–14	(gold) Winner
2022	Thailand Para-Badminton International	Level 1	(Switzerland) Cynthia Mathez	21–13, 21–8	(gold) Winner
2023	Spanish Para-Badminton International II	Level 2	(Belgium) To Man-kei	21–13, 21–10	(gold) Winner
2023	Spanish Para-Badminton International I	Level 1	(Belgium) To Man-Kei	21–13, 21–18	(gold) Winner
2023	Thailand Para-Badminton International	Level 2	(Belgium) To Man-Kei	21–17, 21–12	(gold) Winner
2023	Bahrain Para-Badminton International	Level 2	(China) Yin Menglu	21–17, 21–13	(gold) Winner
2023	4 Nations Para-Badminton International	Level 1	(Thailand) Sujirat Pookkham	19–21, 21–10, 21–13	(gold) Winner
2023	Japan Para-Badminton International	Level 2	(China) Yin Menglu	21–11, 21–19	(gold) Winner
2024	Spanish Para-Badminton International II	Level 2	(Thailand) Sujirat Pookkham	21–18, 21–9	(gold) Winner
2024	Spanish Para-Badminton International I	Level 1	(Thailand) Sujirat Pookkham	21–14, 17–21, 8–21	(silver) Runner-up
2024	4 Nations Para-Badminton International	Level 1	(Thailand) Sujirat Pookkham	23–21, 21–19	(gold) Winner

Women's doubles WH1–WH2

Year	Tournament	Level	Partner	Opponent	Score	Result
2022	Bahrain Para-Badminton International	Level 2	(Japan) Yuma Yamazaki	(South Korea) Jung Gyeo-ul (South Korea) Kwon Hyun-ah	21–17, 21–13	(gold) Winner
2022	Thailand Para-Badminton International	Level 1	(Japan) Yuma Yamazaki	(South Korea) Jung Gyeo-ul (South Korea) Kwon Hyun-ah	21–1, 21–18	(gold) Winner
2023	Spanish Para-Badminton International II	Level 2	(Japan) Yuma Yamazaki	(Switzerland) Cynthia Mathez (Switzerland) Ilaria Renggli	21–12, 21–13	(gold) Winner
2023	Spanish Para-Badminton International I	Level 1	(Japan) Yuma Yamazaki	(South Korea) Jung Gyeo-ul (South Korea) Kwon Hyun-ah	21–12, 21–10	(gold) Winner
2023	Thailand Para-Badminton International	Level 2	(Japan) Yuma Yamazaki	(China) Liu Yutong (China) Yin Menglu	14–21, 22–20, 21–17	(gold) Winner
2023	Bahrain Para-Badminton International	Level 2	(Japan) Yuma Yamazaki	(China) Liu Yutong (China) Yin Menglu	18–21, 18–21	(silver) Runner-up
2023	4 Nations Para-Badminton International	Level 1	(Japan) Yuma Yamazaki	(Thailand) Sujirat Pookkham (Thailand) Amnouy Wetwithan	21–13, 21–14	(gold) Winner
2024	Spanish Para-Badminton International II	Level 2	(Japan) Yuma Yamazaki	(Thailand) Sujirat Pookkham (Thailand) Amnouy Wetwithan	21–16, 21–19	(gold) Winner
2024	Spanish Para-Badminton International I	Level 1	(Japan) Yuma Yamazaki	(Chinese Taipei) Hu Guang-chiou (Chinese Taipei) Yang I-chen	21–8, 21–6	(gold) Winner
2024	Spanish Para-Badminton International I	Level 1	(Japan) Yuma Yamazaki	(Thailand) Sujirat Pookkham (Thailand) Amnouy Wetwithan	21–14, 21–16	(gold) Winner
2024	Spanish Para-Badminton International I	Level 1	(Japan) Yuma Yamazaki	(Brazil) Maria Gilda Antunes (Brazil) Auricélia Nunes	21–6, 21–4	(gold) Winner

=== International tournaments (2011–2021) (11 titles, 2 runners-up) ===
Women's singles WH1

Year	Tournament	Opponent	Score	Result
2018	Japan Para-Badminton International	(Switzerland) Karin Suter-Erath	21–12, 21–23	(gold) Winner
2018	Australia Para-Badminton International	(South Korea) Kim Seung-suk	21–11, 21–7	(gold) Winner
2019	Irish Para-Badminton International	(Switzerland) Karin Suter-Erath	21–17, 21–11	(gold) Winner
2019	Thailand Para-Badminton International	(Germany) Valeska Knoblauch	21–17, 21–13	(gold) Winner
2019	China Para-Badminton International	(Germany) Valeska Knoblauch	21–13, 17–21, 21–12	(silver) Runner-up
2019	China Para-Badminton International	(China) Yin Menglu	16–21, 21–15, 21–11	(silver) Runner-up
2019	China Para-Badminton International	(China) Zhang Jing	21–16, 18–21, 9–21	(silver) Runner-up
2019	China Para-Badminton International	(Belgium) To Man-kei	21–6, 21–13	(silver) Runner-up

Women's doubles WH1–WH2

Year	Tournament	Partner	Opponent	Score	Result
2018	Thailand Para-Badminton International	(Japan) Yuma Yamazaki	(Thailand) Sujirat Pookkham (Thailand) Amnouy Wetwithan	16–21, 13–21	(silver) Runner-up
2018	Japan Para-Badminton International	(Japan) Yuma Yamazaki	(Japan) Ikumi Fuke (Japan) Rie Ogura	21–9, 21–15	(gold) Winner
2018	Australia Para-Badminton International	(Japan) Yuma Yamazaki	(Japan) Etsuko Kobayashi (Japan) Chiemi Ogata	21–1, 21–3	(gold) Winner
2018	Australia Para-Badminton International	(Japan) Yuma Yamazaki	(Japan) Ikumi Fuke (Japan) Rie Ogura	21–13, 21–12	(gold) Winner
2018	Australia Para-Badminton International	(Japan) Yuma Yamazaki	(Switzerland) Cynthia Mathez (France) Emmanuelle Ott	21–9, 21–9	(gold) Winner
2018	Australia Para-Badminton International	(Japan) Yuma Yamazaki	(South Korea) Kim Dae-young (South Korea) Kim Seung-suk	21–11, 21–14	(gold) Winner
2019	Dubai Para-Badminton International	(Japan) Yuma Yamazaki	(China) Xu Tingting (China) Zhang Jing	21–15, 21–13	(gold) Winner
2019	Canada Para-Badminton International	(Japan) Yuma Yamazaki	(Turkey) Emine Seçkin (Belgium) To Man-kei	21–10, 21–6	(gold) Winner
2019	Irish Para-Badminton International	(Japan) Yuma Yamazaki	(Japan) Ikumi Fuke (Japan) Rie Ogura	21–11, 21–15	(gold) Winner
2019	Denmark Para Badminton presented by Danisa	(Japan) Yuma Yamazaki	(Thailand) Sujirat Pookkham (Thailand) Amnouy Wetwithan	21–18, 21–16	(gold) Winner
2019	Japan Para-Badminton International	(Japan) Yuma Yamazaki	(China) Liu Yutong (China) Yin Menglu	14–21, 25–23, 21–15	(gold) Winner
