= Yuma Yamazaki =

Japanese para-badminton player (born 1988)

Yuma Yamazaki 山崎 悠麻
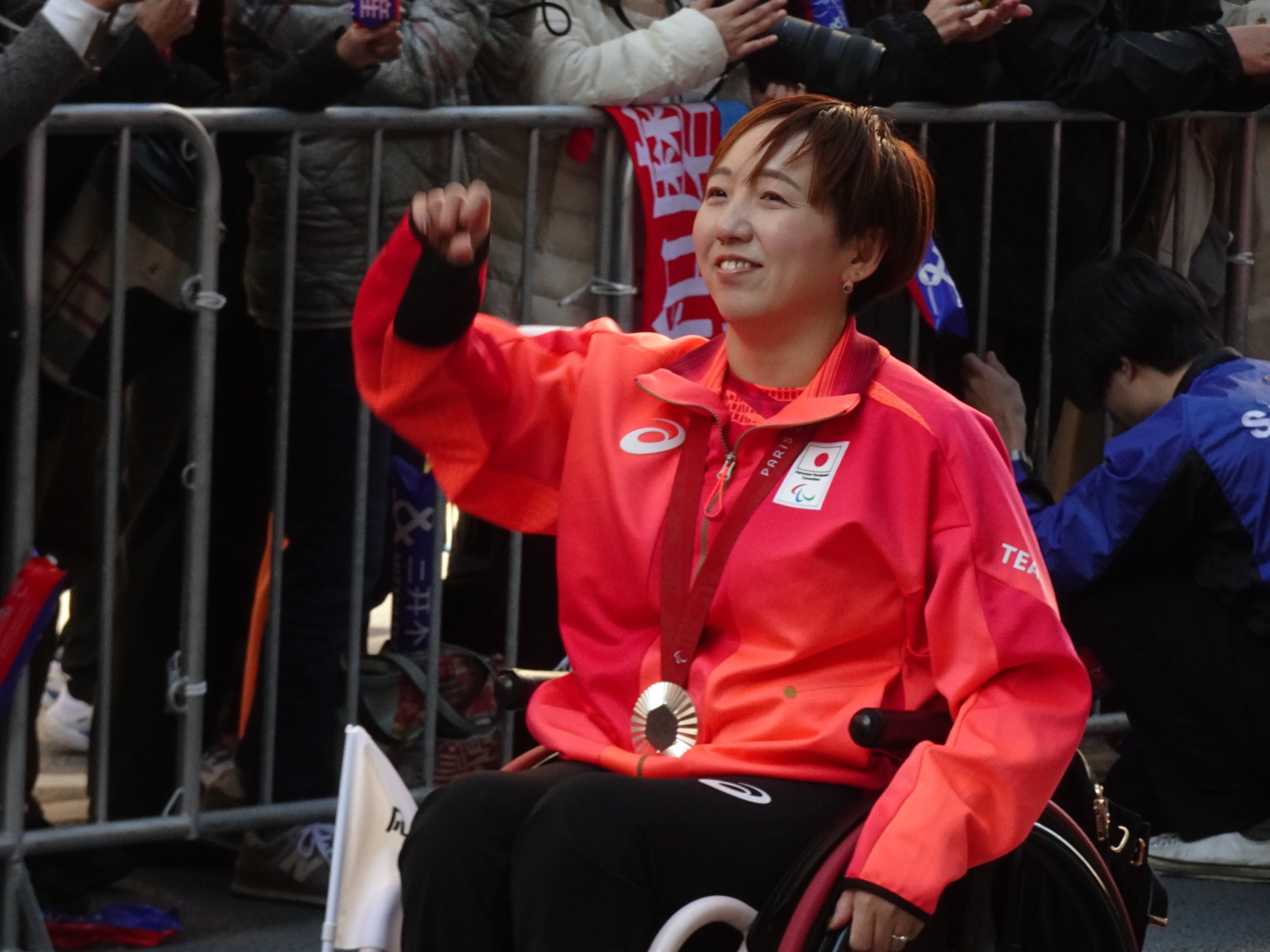
- Yuma Yamazaki at Paris 2024 Summer Olympians and Paralympians Japan National Team parade event on November 30th, 2024

Personal information
- Born: 8 April 1988 (age 38) Kokubunji, Japan

Sport
- Country: Japan
- Sport: Badminton

Women's singles WH2 Women's doubles WH1–WH2 Mixed doubles WH1–WH2
- Highest ranking: 2 (WS 1 January 2019); 1 (WD with Sarina Satomi 16 May 2019); 2 (XD with Osamu Nagashima 1 January 2019)
- Current ranking: 2 (WS); 1 (WD with Sarina Satomi); 36 (XD with Osamu Nagashima) (8 November 2022)
Medal record
Para-badminton
Representing Japan
Paralympic Games
Gold medal – first place	2020 Tokyo	Women's doubles
Silver medal – second place	2024 Paris	Women's doubles
Bronze medal – third place	2020 Tokyo	Women's singles
World Championships
Gold medal – first place	2022 Tokyo	Women's doubles
Bronze medal – third place	2017 Ulsan	Women's doubles
Bronze medal – third place	2019 Basel	Women's doubles
Bronze medal – third place	2022 Tokyo	Women's singles
Bronze medal – third place	2024 Pattaya	Women's singles
Bronze medal – third place	2024 Pattaya	Women's doubles
Asian Para Games
Silver medal – second place	2022 Hangzhou	Women's doubles
Bronze medal – third place	2018 Jakarta	Women's singles
Bronze medal – third place	2018 Jakarta	Mixed doubles
Asian Championships
Bronze medal – third place	2016 Beijing	Women's doubles

Yuma Yamazaki (山崎 悠麻, Yamazaki Yuki; born 8 April 1988) is a Japanese para-badminton player who competes in international elite competitions. She competed at the 2020 Summer Paralympics and won a gold medal in women's doubles WH1–WH2, and a bronze medal in women's singles WH2 events.

== Life ==
Yamazaki sustained a spinal cord injury when she was involved in a traffic accident at age 16.

== Achievements ==
=== Paralympic Games ===
Women's singles WH2

Year	Venue	Opponent	Score	Result
2020	Yoyogi National Gymnasium, Tokyo, Japan	(Turkey) Emine Seçkin	21–16, 21–8	Bronze

Women's doubles WH1–WH2

Year	Venue	Partner	Opponent	Score	Result
2020	Yoyogi National Gymnasium, Tokyo, Japan	(Japan) Sarina Satomi	(China) Liu Yutong (China) Yin Menglu	16–21, 21–16, 21–13	Gold
2024	Arena Porte de La Chapelle, Paris, France	(Japan) Sarina Satomi	(China) Liu Yutong (China) Yin Menglu	17–21, 19–21	Silver

=== World Championships ===
Women's singles
Year	Venue	Opponent	Score	Result
2022	Yoyogi National Gymnasium; Tokyo, Japan	(Peru) Pilar Jáuregui	17–21, 11–21	Bronze
2024	Pattaya Exhibition and Convention Hall; Pattaya, Thailand	(Peru) Pilar Jáuregui	13–21, 15–21	Bronze

Women's doubles
Year	Venue	Partner	Opponent	Score	Result
2017	Dongchun Gymnasium; Ulsan, South Korea	(Japan) Ikume Fuke	(China) Li Hongyan (China) Yang Fan	7–21, 11–21	Bronze
2019	St. Jakobshalle; Basel, Switzerland	(Japan) Sarina Satomi	(China) Liu Yutong (China) Yin Menglu	Walkover	Bronze
2022	Yoyogi National Gymnasium; Tokyo, Japan	(Japan) Sarina Satomi	(Turkey) Emine Seçkin (Belgium) To Man-kei	21–11, 21–15	Gold
2024	Pattaya Exhibition and Convention Hall; Pattaya, Thailand	(Japan) Sarina Satomi	(China) Liu Yutong (China) Yin Menglu	7–21, 17–21	Bronze

=== Asian Para Games ===
Women's singles
Year	Venue	Opponent	Score	Result
2018	Istora Gelora Bung Karno; Jakarta, Indonesia	(China) Xu Tingting	21–18, 16–21, 20–22	Bronze

Mixed doubles
Year	Venue	Partner	Opponent	Score	Result
2018	Istora Gelora Bung Karno, Jakarta, Indonesia	(Japan) Osamu Nagashima	(China) Mai Jianpeng (China) Li Hongyan	11–21, 19–21	Bronze

=== Asian Championships ===
Year	Venue	Partner	Opponent	Score	Result
2016	China Administration of Sport for Persons with Disabilities; Beijing, China	(Japan) Etsuko Kobayashi	(China) Li Hongyan (China) Yang Fan	8–21, 13–21	Bronze

=== BWF Para Badminton World Circuit (9 titles, 1 runners-up) ===
Women's singles

Year	Tournament	Level	Opponent	Score	Result
2022	Bahrain Para-Badminton International	Level 2	(Thailand) Amnouy Wetwithan	21–8, 21–11	(gold) Winner
2022	Dubai Para-Badminton International	Level 2	(South Korea) Jung Gyeo-ul	21–12, 22–20	(gold) Winner
2022 (Note: This tournament uses a round robin system.)	4 Nations Para-Badminton International	Level 1	(France) Marilou Maurel	21–2, 21–2	(gold) Winner
2022	4 Nations Para-Badminton International	Level 1	(Germany) Annika Schroeder	21–5, 21–3	(gold) Winner
2022	4 Nations Para-Badminton International	Level 1	(Switzerland) Ilaria Renggli	21–8, 21–11	(gold) Winner
2022	Thailand Para-Badminton International	Level 1	(South Korea) Jung Gyeo-ul	21–17, 21–10	(gold) Winner
2023	Spanish Para-Badminton International	Level 2	(Peru) Pilar Jáuregui	15–21, 19–21	(silver) Runner-up
2023	Spanish Para-Badminton International	Level 1	(Peru) Pilar Jáuregui	21–15, 16–21, 21–12	(gold) Winner

Women's doubles
Year	Tournament	Level	Partner	Opponent	Score	Result
2022	Bahrain Para-Badminton International	Level 2	(Japan) Sarina Satomi	(South Korea) Jung Gyeo-ul (South Korea) Kwon Hyun-ah	21–17, 21–13	(gold) Winner
2022	Thailand Para-Badminton International	Level 1	(Japan) Sarina Satomi	(South Korea) Jung Gyeo-ul (South Korea) Kwon Hyun-ah	21–1, 21–18	(gold) Winner
2023	Spanish Para-Badminton International	Level 2	(Japan) Sarina Satomi	(Switzerland) Cynthia Mathez (Switzerland) Ilaria Renggli	21–12, 21–13	(gold) Winner
2023	Spanish Para-Badminton International	Level 1	(Japan) Sarina Satomi	(South Korea) Jung Gyeo-ul (South Korea) Kwon Hyun-ah	21–12, 21–10	(gold) Winner
