= Badminton at the 2020 Summer Paralympics =

Badminton at the XVI Paralympic Games
- Badminton pictogram of the 2020 Summer Paralympics
- Venue: Yoyogi National Gymnasium
- Dates: 1–5 September 2021
- Competitors: 90 from 28 nations

Badminton at the 2020 Summer Paralympics in Tokyo, Japan, was played at the Yoyogi National Gymnasium (renamed to Yoyogi National Stadium for the Games) from 1 to 5 September 2021. There were a total of fourteen events taking place: seven male events (six singles, one doubles), six female events (four singles, two doubles) and one mixed doubles event.

The 2020 Summer Olympic and Paralympic Games were postponed to 2021 due to the COVID-19 pandemic. They kept the 2020 name and were held from 24 August to 5 September 2021.

== Classification ==
There were six different classes in the competition.

Class	Description
WH1	Athletes who have impairment in both lower limbs and trunk and/or have high spinal cord injuries. They may also have impaired hand function which could impact the ability to manoeuvre in their wheelchair. Their playing style is by holding their wheelchair with one hand while the other hand is moving the racquet; they will push or pull themselves to a neutral wheelchair sitting position after the stroke.
WH2	Similar to WH1 athletes, WH2 athletes have one or more impairments in their lower limbs, one or more loss of legs (above the knee) and would have minimal or no trunk impairment and/or lower . They would move their wheelchairs quicker than WH1 athletes and they will hold onto their wheels less to maintain their balance.
SL3	Athletes would have impairment in one or both lower limbs and have poor walking/running balance: to reduce their impairment, they would often compete on half-court (lengthwise). These athletes would have cerebral palsy, bilateral polio or loss of both legs below the knee.
SL4	Athletes would run faster and have better balance than athletes who are in the SL3 class, they would have an impairment in one or both lower limbs, unilateral polio or mild cerebral palsy. These athletes would play on full-court.
SU5	Unlike the SL3 and SL4 sport classes, SU5 have impairments in their upper limbs such as a missing thumb which restricts grip and power of the stroke or loss of an arm due to amputation or nerve damage. Also, athletes may have a severe impairment to their non-playing arm which can affect balance movements, trunk rotation and ability to serve.
SH6	Athletes who have achondroplasia and short stature.

== Schedule ==
G	Group stage	¼	Quarter-finals	½	Semi-finals	F	Finals

Events	Dates						
Events	Wed 1 Sep	Thu 2 Sep	Fri 3 Sep		Sat 4 Sep		Sun 5 Sep
Men's singles WH1	G	G	G	¼	½	F	
Men's singles WH2		G	G	¼	½		F
Men's singles SL3	G	G	G		½	F	
Men's singles SL4		G	G		½		F
Men's singles SU5	G	G	G		½	F	
Men's singles SH6		G	G		½		F
Women's singles WH1	G	G	¼		½	F	
Women's singles WH2	G	G	G	¼	½	F	
Women's singles SL4		G	G		½		F
Women's singles SU5	G	G	G	¼	½	F	
Men's doubles WH1–WH2		G	G		½		F
Women's doubles WH1–WH2		G	G		½		F
Women's doubles SL3–SU5		G	G		½	F	
Mixed doubles SL3–SU5	G	G	G		½		F

== Participating nations ==
- Australia (2)
- Brazil (1)
- Canada (1)
- China (9)
- Chinese Taipei (1)
- Denmark (1)
- Egypt (1)
- France (6)
- Germany (6)
- Great Britain (4)
- Hong Kong (2)
- India (7)
- Indonesia (7)
- Israel (1)
- Japan (13) (Host nation)
- Malaysia (2)
- Netherlands (1)
- Norway (1)
- Peru (1)
- Poland (1)
- Portugal (1)
- RPC (1)
- South Korea (7)
- Switzerland (2)
- Thailand (7)
- Turkey (2)
- Uganda (1)
- Ukraine (1)

== Medal table ==
Rank	NPC	Gold	Silver	Bronze	Total
1	China	5	3	2	10
2	Japan*	3	1	5	9
3	Indonesia	2	2	2	6
4	India	2	1	1	4
5	France	1	1	0	2
6	Malaysia	1	0	0	1
7	South Korea	0	3	1	4
8	Great Britain	0	1	1	2
8	Hong Kong	0	1	1	2
8	Thailand	0	1	1	2
Totals (10 entries)		14	14	14	42

== Medalists ==
=== Singles events ===
Event	Class	Gold	Silver	Bronze
Men's singles	WH1	Qu Zimo; China	Lee Sam-seop; South Korea	Lee Dong-seop; South Korea
Men's singles	WH2	Daiki Kajiwara; Japan	Kim Jung-jun; South Korea	Chan Ho Yuen; Hong Kong
Men's singles	SL3	Pramod Bhagat; India	Daniel Bethell; Great Britain	Manoj Sarkar; India
Men's singles	SL4	Lucas Mazur; France	Suhas Lalinakere Yathiraj; India	Fredy Setiawan; Indonesia
Men's singles	SU5	Cheah Liek Hou; Malaysia	Dheva Anrimusthi; Indonesia	Suryo Nugroho; Indonesia
Men's singles	SH6	Krishna Nagar; India	Chu Man Kai; Hong Kong	Krysten Coombs; Great Britain
Women's singles	WH1	Sarina Satomi; Japan	Sujirat Pookkham; Thailand	Yin Menglu; China
Women's singles	WH2	Liu Yutong; China	Xu Tingting; China	Yuma Yamazaki; Japan
Women's singles	SL4	Cheng Hefang; China	Leani Ratri Oktila; Indonesia	Ma Huihui; China
Women's singles	SU5	Yang Qiuxia; China	Ayako Suzuki; Japan	Akiko Sugino; Japan

=== Doubles events ===
Event	Class	Gold	Silver	Bronze
Men's doubles	WH1–WH2	China; Mai Jianpeng; Qu Zimo	South Korea; Kim Jung-jun; Lee Dong-seop	Japan; Daiki Kajiwara; Hiroshi Murayama
Women's doubles	WH1–WH2	Japan; Sarina Satomi; Yuma Yamazaki	China; Liu Yutong; Yin Menglu	Thailand; Sujirat Pookkham; Amnouy Wetwithan
Women's doubles	SL3–SU5	Indonesia; Leani Ratri Oktila; Khalimatus Sadiyah	China; Cheng Hefang; Ma Huihui	Japan; Noriko Ito; Ayako Suzuki
Mixed doubles	SL3–SU5	Indonesia; Hary Susanto; Leani Ratri Oktila	France; Lucas Mazur; Faustine Noël	Japan; Daisuke Fujihara; Akiko Sugino
