= Yin Menglu =

Chinese para badminton player

Yin Menglu 尹梦璐
Personal information
- Born: 27 January 2002 (age 24) Handan, Hebei, China
- Height: 150 cm (4 ft 11 in)
- Weight: 47 kg (104 lb)

Sport
- Country: China
- Sport: Badminton
- Coached by: Qu Fuchun

Women's singles WH1 Women's doubles WH1–WH2
- Highest ranking: 4 (WS 17 February 2020); 1 (WD with Liu Yutong 18 July 2022)
- Current ranking: 17 (WS); 11 (WD with Liu Yutong) (8 November 2022)
- BWF profile
Medal record
Women's para badminton
Representing China
Paralympic Games
Gold medal – first place	2024 Paris	Women's doubles
Silver medal – second place	2020 Tokyo	Women's doubles
Bronze medal – third place	2020 Tokyo	Women's singles
Bronze medal – third place	2024 Paris	Women's singles
World Championships
Gold medal – first place	2019 Basel	Women's doubles
Gold medal – first place	2024 Pattaya	Women's singles
Gold medal – first place	2024 Pattaya	Women's doubles
Gold medal – first place	2026 Manama	Women's doubles
Silver medal – second place	2026 Manama	Women's singles
Bronze medal – third place	2019 Basel	Women's singles
Asian Para Games
Gold medal – first place	2022 Hangzhou	Women's doubles
Bronze medal – third place	2022 Hangzhou	Women's singles

Yin Menglu (born 27 January 2002) is a Chinese para badminton player. She participated at the 2020 Summer Paralympics in the badminton competition, and won a silver medal in the women's doubles WH1–WH2 event with her teammate, Liu Yutong, and a bronze medal in the women's singles WH1 event.

== Achievements ==
=== Paralympic Games ===
Women's singles WH1

Year	Venue	Opponent	Score	Result
2020	Yoyogi National Gymnasium, Tokyo, Japan	(China) Zhang Jing	21–10, 21–18	Bronze
2024	Porte de La Chapelle Arena, Paris, France	(Belgium) To Man-kei	21–9, 21–9	Bronze

Women's doubles WH1–WH2

Year	Venue	Partner	Opponent	Score	Result
2020	Yoyogi National Gymnasium, Tokyo, Japan	(China) Liu Yutong	(Japan) Sarina Satomi (Japan) Yuma Yamazaki	21–16, 16–21, 13–21	Silver
2024	Porte de La Chapelle Arena, Paris, France	(China) Liu Yutong	(Japan) Sarina Satomi (Japan) Yuma Yamazaki	21–17, 21–19	Gold

=== World Championships ===
Women's singles WH1
Year	Venue	Opponent	Score	Result
2019	St. Jakobshalle; Basel, Switzerland	(Thailand) Sujirat Pookkham	16–21, 17–21	Bronze
2024	Pattaya Exhibition and Convention Hall; Pattaya, Thailand	(Thailand) Sujirat Pookkham	21–12, 21–15	Gold

Women's doubles WH1–WH2
Year	Venue	Partner	Opponent	Score	Result
2019	St. Jakobshalle; Basel, Switzerland	(China) Liu Yutong	(Thailand) Sujirat Pookkham (Thailand) Amnouy Wetwithan	21–11, 21–15	Gold
2024	Pattaya Exhibition and Convention Hall; Pattaya, Thailand	(China) Liu Yutong	(China) Fan Chaoyue (China) Li Hongyan	21–14, 21–10	Gold

=== Asian Para Games ===
Women's singles WH1
Year	Venue	Opponent	Score	Result
2022	Binjiang Gymnasium; Hangzhou, China	(Japan) Sarina Satomi	21–14, 19–21, 14–21	Bronze

Women's doubles WH1–WH2

Year	Venue	Partner	Opponent	Score	Result
2022	Binjiang Gymnasium, Hangzhou, China	(China) Liu Yutong	(Chinese Taipei) Hu Guang-chiou (Chinese Taipei) Yang I-chen	21–4, 21–13	Gold
2022	Binjiang Gymnasium, Hangzhou, China	(China) Liu Yutong	(Japan) Sarina Satomi (Japan) Yuma Yamazaki	21–10, 21–17	Gold
2022	Binjiang Gymnasium, Hangzhou, China	(China) Liu Yutong	(South Korea) Jung Gyeo-ul (South Korea) Kwon Hyun-ah	21–9, 21–13	Gold
2022	Binjiang Gymnasium, Hangzhou, China	(China) Liu Yutong	(Thailand) Sujirat Pookkham (Thailand) Amnouy Wetwithan	21–13, 21–3	Gold

=== BWF Para Badminton World Circuit (4 titles, 3 runners-up) ===
The BWF Para Badminton World Circuit – Grade 2, Level 1, 2 and 3 tournaments has been sanctioned by the Badminton World Federation from 2022.

Women's singles WH1
Year	Tournament	Level	Opponent	Score	Result
2023	Bahrain Para-Badminton International	Level 2	(Japan) Sarina Satomi	17–21, 13–21	(silver) Runner-up
2023	Japan Para-Badminton International	Level 2	(Japan) Sarina Satomi	11–21, 19–21	(silver) Runner-up
2023	Dubai Para-Badminton International	Level 1	(South Korea) Kwon Hyun-ah	21–8, 21–16	(gold) Winner

Women's doubles WH1–WH2
Year	Tournament	Level	Partner	Opponent	Score	Result
2023	Thailand Para-Badminton International	Level 2	(China) Liu Yutong	(Japan) Sarina Satomi (Japan) Yuma Yamazaki	21–14, 20–22, 17–21	(silver) Runner-up
2023	Bahrain Para-Badminton International	Level 2	(China) Liu Yutong	(Japan) Sarina Satomi (Japan) Yuma Yamazaki	21–18, 21–18	(gold) Winner
2023	Japan Para-Badminton International	Level 2	(China) Liu Yutong	(China) Fan Chaoyue (China) Li Hongyan	21–9, 21–14	(gold) Winner
2023	Dubai Para-Badminton International	Level 1	(China) Liu Yutong	(South Korea) Jung Gyeo-ul (South Korea) Kwon Hyun-ah	21–8, 21–6	(gold) Winner

=== International tournaments (2011–2021) (2 titles, 6 runners-up) ===
Women's singles WH1
Year	Tournament	Opponent	Score	Result
2019	Turkish Para-Badminton International	(China) Zhang Jing	16–21, 22–20, 21–19	(gold) Winner
2019	Dubai Para-Badminton International	(China) Zhang Jing	13–21, 13–21	(silver) Runner-up
2019	Japan Para-Badminton International	(Thailand) Sujirat Pookkham	17–21, 7–21	(silver) Runner-up
2020	Brazil Para-Badminton International	(China) Zhang Jing	18–21, 16–21	(silver) Runner-up

Women's doubles WH1–WH2
Year	Tournament	Partner	Opponent	Score	Result
2019	Turkish Para-Badminton International	(China) Liu Yutong	(China) Xu Tingting (China) Zhang Jing	18–21, 16–21	(silver) Runner-up
2019	Japan Para-Badminton International	(China) Liu Yutong	(Japan) Sarina Satomi (Japan) Yuma Yamazaki	21–14, 23–25, 15–21	(silver) Runner-up
2020	Brazil Para-Badminton International	(China) Liu Yutong	(Turkey) Emine Seçkin (Belgium) To Man-kei	21–13, 21–11	(gold) Winner

Mixed doubles WH1–WH2
Year	Tournament	Partner	Opponent	Score	Result
2019	Turkish Para-Badminton International	(China) Mai Jianpeng	(China) Qu Zimo (China) Liu Yutong	8–21, 12–21	(silver) Runner-up
