= Sujirat Pookkham =

Thai para-badminton player

Personal information
- Born: 15 March 1986 (age 40) Chiang Rai, Thailand

Sport
- Country: Thailand
- Sport: Badminton
- Coached by: Apinop Arayacharoen

Women's singles WH1 Women's doubles WH1–WH2
- Highest ranking: 1 (WS 1 January 2019); 1 (WD with Amnouy Wetwithan 1 January 2019)
- Current ranking: 11 (WS); 12 (WD with Amnouy Wetwithan) (8 November 2022)
- BWF profile
Medal record
Para-badminton
Representing Thailand
Paralympic Games
Silver medal – second place	2020 Tokyo	Women's singles
Bronze medal – third place	2020 Tokyo	Women's doubles
Bronze medal – third place	2024 Paris	Women's doubles
World Championships
Gold medal – first place	2009 Seoul	Women's singles
Gold medal – first place	2013 Dortmund	Mixed doubles
Gold medal – first place	2015 Stoke Mandeville	Women's doubles
Silver medal – second place	2009 Seoul	Women's doubles
Silver medal – second place	2013 Dortmund	Women's doubles
Silver medal – second place	2017 Ulsan	Women's doubles
Silver medal – second place	2019 Basel	Women's singles
Silver medal – second place	2019 Basel	Women's doubles
Silver medal – second place	2024 Pattaya	Women's singles
Bronze medal – third place	2013 Dortmund	Women's singles
Bronze medal – third place	2015 Stoke Mandeville	Mixed doubles
Bronze medal – third place	2017 Ulsan	Women's singles
Bronze medal – third place	2024 Pattaya	Women's doubles
Bronze medal – third place	2026 Manama	Women's singles
Bronze medal – third place	2026 Manama	Women's doubles
Asian Para Games
Silver medal – second place	2014 Incheon	Women's doubles
Silver medal – second place	2018 Jakarta	Women's singles
Silver medal – second place	2018 Jakarta	Women's doubles
Silver medal – second place	2022 Hangzhou	Women's singles
Bronze medal – third place	2010 Guangzhou	Women's singles
Bronze medal – third place	2014 Incheon	Mixed doubles
Bronze medal – third place	2022 Hangzhou	Women's doubles
Asian Championships
Gold medal – first place	2012 Yeoju	Women's singles
Silver medal – second place	2012 Yeoju	Women's doubles
Silver medal – second place	2016 Beijing	Women's doubles
Bronze medal – third place	2012 Yeoju	Mixed doubles
Bronze medal – third place	2016 Beijing	Women's singles
ASEAN Para Games
Silver medal – second place	2015 Singapore	Women's singles
Silver medal – second place	2017 Kuala Lumpur	Women's singles

Sujirat Pookkham (Thai: สุจิรัตน์ ปุกคำ; born 15 March 1986) is a Thai para-badminton player who competes in international elite competitions. She is a World women's singles champion in 2009. Sujirat competed for Thailand at the 2020 Summer Paralympics which she won a silver medal in women's singles WH1 event and another bronze medal in the women's doubles WH1–WH2 event.

== Achievements ==
=== Paralympic Games ===
Women's singles WH1

Year	Venue	Opponent	Score	Result
2020	Yoyogi National Gymnasium, Tokyo, Japan	(Japan) Sarina Satomi	21–14, 19–21, 13–21	Silver

Women's doubles WH1–WH2

Year	Venue	Partner	Opponent	Score	Result
2020	Yoyogi National Gymnasium, Tokyo, Japan	(Thailand) Amnouy Wetwithan	(Switzerland) Cynthia Mathez (Switzerland) Karin Suter-Erath	21–17, 21–12	Bronze

=== World Championships ===
Women's singles
Year	Venue	Opponent	Score	Result
2009	Fencing Hall; Seoul, South Korea	(South Korea) Lee Mi-ok	12–21, 21–8, 21–9	Gold
2013	Helmut-Koernig-Halle, Dortmund, Germany	(South Korea) Son Ok-cha	17–21, 18–21	Bronze
2017	Dongchun Gymnasium, Ulsan, South Korea	(China) Li Hongyan	9–21, 11–21	Bronze
2019	St. Jakobshalle; Basel, Switzerland	(Japan) Sarina Satomi	16–21, 15–21	Silver
2024	Pattaya Exhibition and Convention Hall; Pattaya, Thailand	(China) Yin Menglu	12–21, 15–21	Silver

Women’s doubles
Year	Venue	Partner	Opponent	Score	Result
2009	Fencing Hall, Seoul, South Korea	(Thailand) Amnouy Wetwithan	(South Korea) Lee Sun-ae (South Korea) Kim Yeon-sim	18–21, 10–21	Silver
2013	Helmut-Koernig-Halle, Dortmund, Germany	(Switzerland) Karin Suter-Erath	(South Korea) Lee Sun-ae (South Korea) Son Ok-cha	11–21, 21–19, 19–21	Silver
2015	Stoke Mandeville Stadium, Stoke Mandeville, England	(Thailand) Amnouy Wetwithan	(South Korea) Kang Jung-kum (South Korea) Kim Yun-sim	21–8, 21–14	Gold
2017	Dongchun Gymnasium, Ulsan, South Korea	(Thailand) Amnouy Wetwithan	(China) Li Hongyan (China) Yang Fan	11–21, 13–21	Silver
2019	St. Jakobshalle, Basel, Switzerland	(Thailand) Amnouy Wetwithan	(China) Liu Yutong (China) Yin Menglu	11–21, 15–21	Silver
2024	Pattaya Exhibition and Convention Hall, Pattaya, Thailand	(Thailand) Amnouy Wetwithan	(China) Fan Chaoyue (China) Li Hongyan	19–21, 21–15, 12–21	Bronze
2026	Isa Sports City, Manama, Bahrain	(Thailand) Onanong Phraikaeo	(China) Fan Chaoyue (China) Li Hongyan	17–15, 12–21	Bronze

Mixed doubles
Year	Venue	Partner	Opponent	Score	Result
2013	Helmut-Koernig-Halle, Dortmund, Germany	(Thailand) Jakarin Homhual	(South Korea) Lee Sam-seop (South Korea) Son Ok-cha	21–15, 22–20	Gold
2015	Stoke Mandeville Stadium, Stoke Mandeville, England	(Thailand) Dumnern Junthong	(Thailand) Jakarin Homhual (Thailand) Amnouy Wetwithan	14–21, 15–21	Bronze

=== Asian Para Games ===
Women's singles

Year	Venue	Opponent	Score	Result
2010 (Note: This tournament uses a round robin system.)	Tianhe Gymnasium, Guangzhou, China	(Thailand) Amnouy Wetwithan	9–21, 12–21	Bronze
2010	Tianhe Gymnasium, Guangzhou, China	(South Korea) Lee Sun-ae	19–21, 10–21	Bronze
2010	Tianhe Gymnasium, Guangzhou, China	(Japan) Yoko Egami	21–6, 21–8	Bronze
2018	Istora Gelora Bung Karno, Jakarta, Indonesia	(China) Li Hongyan	12–21, 14–21	Silver

Women’s doubles
Year	Venue	Partner	Opponent	Score	Result
2014	Gyeyang Gymnasium; Incheon, South Korea	(Thailand) Amnouy Wetwithan	(South Korea) Kim Yeon-sim (South Korea) Lee Mi-ok	16–21, 21–13, 18–21	Silver
2018	Istora Gelora Bung Karno; Jakarta, Indonesia	(Thailand) Amnouy Wetwithan	(China) Li Hongyan (China) Xu Tingting	17–21, 21–11, 13–21	Silver

Mixed doubles
Year	Venue	Partner	Opponent	Score	Result
2014	Gyeyang Gymnasium; Incheon, South Korea	(Thailand) Dumnern Junthong	(South Korea) Lee Sam-seop (South Korea) Lee Sun-ae	21–23, 11–21	Bronze

=== Asian Championships ===
Women's singles

Year	Venue	Opponent	Score	Result
2012 (Note: This tournament uses a round robin system.)	Yeo-ju Sports Center, Yeoju, South Korea	(Thailand) Piyawan Thinjun	21–12, 21–9	Gold
2012	Yeo-ju Sports Center, Yeoju, South Korea	(Japan) Midori Shimada	21–4, 21–5	Gold
2012	Yeo-ju Sports Center, Yeoju, South Korea	(South Korea) Son Ok-cha	21–12, 21–15	Gold
2012	Yeo-ju Sports Center, Yeoju, South Korea	(South Korea) Lee Mi-ok	18–21, 21–12, 21–8	Gold
2016	China Administration of Sport for Persons with Disabilities, Beijing, China	(China) Wang Ping	18–21, 19–21	Bronze

Women's doubles

Year	Venue	Partner	Opponent	Score	Result
2012 (Note: This tournament uses a round robin system.)	Yeo-ju Sports Center, Yeoju, South Korea	(Thailand) Piyawan Thinjun	(South Korea) Kim Yun-sim (South Korea) Lee Sun-ae	21–19, 9–21, 24–22	Silver
2012	Yeo-ju Sports Center, Yeoju, South Korea	(Thailand) Piyawan Thinjun	(Japan) Yoko Egami (Japan) Rie Ogura	21–5, 21–11	Silver
2012	Yeo-ju Sports Center, Yeoju, South Korea	(Thailand) Piyawan Thinjun	(South Korea) Lee Mi-ok (South Korea) Son Ok-cha	21–23, 21–18, 17–21	Silver
2012	Yeo-ju Sports Center, Yeoju, South Korea	(Thailand) Piyawan Thinjun	(Japan) Etsuko Kobayashi (Japan) Midori Shimada	21–7, 21–14	Silver
2016	China Administration of Sport for Persons with Disabilities, Beijing, China	(Thailand) Amnouy Wetwithan	(China) Li Hongyan (China) Yang Fan	16–21, 14–21	Silver

Mixed doubles

Year	Venue	Partner	Opponent	Score	Result
2012 (Note: This tournament uses a round robin system.)	Yeo-ju Sports Center, Yeoju, South Korea	(Thailand) Jakarin Homhual	(Thailand) Chatchai Kornpeekanok (Thailand) Piyawan Thinjun	21–13, 21–14	Bronze
2012	Yeo-ju Sports Center, Yeoju, South Korea	(Thailand) Jakarin Homhual	(South Korea) Kim Jung-jun (South Korea) Son Ok-cha	21–18, 9–21, 17–21	Bronze
2012	Yeo-ju Sports Center, Yeoju, South Korea	(Thailand) Jakarin Homhual	(Japan) Hiroki Fujino (Japan) Midori Shimada	21–10, 21–8	Bronze
2012	Yeo-ju Sports Center, Yeoju, South Korea	(Thailand) Jakarin Homhual	(South Korea) Lee Sam-seop (South Korea) Lee Mi-ok	21–18, 13–21, 16–21	Bronze

=== ASEAN Para Games ===
Women's singles

Year	Venue	Opponent	Score	Result
2011	Sritex Sports Arena, Surakarta, Indonesia	(Thailand) Amnouy Wetwithan	13–21, 15–21	Silver
2015	OCBC Arena, Singapore	(Thailand) Amnouy Wetwithan	8–21, 14–21	Silver
2017 (Note: This tournament uses a round robin system.)	Axiata Arena, Kuala Lumpur, Malaysia	(Thailand) Piyawan Thinjun	21–12, 21–15	Silver
2017	Axiata Arena, Kuala Lumpur, Malaysia	(Philippines) Lita Paz Enano	21–7, 21–4	Silver
2017	Axiata Arena, Kuala Lumpur, Malaysia	(Philippines) Imelda Isidro Legazpi	21–9, 21–4	Silver
2017	Axiata Arena, Kuala Lumpur, Malaysia	(Thailand) Amnouy Wetwithan	21–19, 15–21, 10–21	Silver
