= Badminton at the 2023 European Para Championships – Women's doubles SL3–SU5 =

Badminton's women's doubles SL3–SU5 at the 2023 European Para Championships
- Venue: Rotterdam Ahoy, Rotterdam
- Dates: 15 – 20 August
- Competitors: 14 from 8 nations

Medalists
gold medal	Coraline Bergeron; Maud Lefort	France
silver medal	Lénaïg Morin; Milena Surreau	France
bronze medal	Oksana Kozyna; Ivanna Redka	Ukraine
bronze medal	Beatriz Monteiro; Catherine Naudin	Mixed-NOCs

The women's doubles SL3–SU5 badminton tournament at the 2023 European Para Championships was played from 15 to 20 August 2023 in Rotterdam Ahoy, Rotterdam. A total of 17 pairs competed at the tournament, five of whom was seeded.

== Competition schedule ==
Play took place between 15 and 20 August.

GS	Group stage	½	Semifinals	F	Final

Events	Tue 15	Wed 16	Thu 17	Fri 18	Sat 19	Sun 20
Women's doubles SL3–SU5	GS	GS	GS		½	F

== Seeds ==
The following players were seeded:

1. Beatriz Monteiro (POR) / Catherine Naudin (FRA) (semi-finals; bronze medalist)
2. Rosa De Marco (ITA) / Emona Ivanova (BUL) (group stage)

== Group stage ==
=== Group A ===
Pos	Team	Pld	W	L	GF	GA	GD	PF	PA	PD	Qualification
1	Coraline Bergeron (FRA) Maud Lefort (FRA)	2	2	0	4	0	+4	84	36	+48	Qualification to elimination stage
2	Beatriz Monteiro (POR) Catherine Naudin (FRA) [1]	2	1	1	2	2	0	68	72	−4	Qualification to elimination stage
3	Tuğçe Çelik (TUR) Halime Yıldız (TUR)	2	0	2	0	4	−4	40	84	−44	

Source: Group A – standings

Date		Score		Game 1	Game 2	Game 3
15 August	Coraline Bergeron (France); Maud Lefort (France)	2–0	(Turkey) Tuğçe Çelik (Turkey) Halime Yıldız	21–7	21–3	
16 August	Beatriz Monteiro (Portugal); Catherine Naudin (France)	0–2	(France) Coraline Bergeron (France) Maud Lefort	11–21	15–21	
17 August	Beatriz Monteiro (Portugal); Catherine Naudin (France)	2–0	(Turkey) Tuğçe Çelik (Turkey) Halime Yıldız	21–12	21–18	

=== Group B ===
Pos	Team	Pld	W	L	GF	GA	GD	PF	PA	PD	Qualification
1	Lénaïg Morin (FRA) Milena Surreau (FRA)	3	2	1	5	2	+3	140	109	+31	Qualification to elimination stage
2	Oksana Kozyna (UKR) Ivanna Redka (UKR)	3	2	1	4	3	+1	127	123	+4	Qualification to elimination stage
3	Rosa De Marco (ITA) Emona Ivanova (BUL) [2]	3	2	1	5	4	+1	171	155	+16	
4	Emma Stoner (GBR) Sophie van den Broek (NED)	3	0	3	1	6	−5	93	144	−51	

Source: Group B – standings

Date		Score		Game 1	Game 2	Game 3
15 August	Rosa De Marco (Italy); Emona Ivanova (Bulgaria)	1–2	(Ukraine) Oksana Kozyna (Ukraine) Ivanna Redka	21–12	17–21	16–21
15 August	Emma Stoner (United Kingdom); Sophie van den Broek (Netherlands)	0–2	(France) Lénaïg Morin (France) Milena Surreau	11–21	10–21	
16 August	Rosa De Marco (Italy); Emona Ivanova (Bulgaria)	1–2	(United Kingdom) Emma Stoner (Netherlands) Sophie van den Broek	18–21	21–14	21–10
16 August	Lénaïg Morin (France); Milena Surreau (France)	2–0	(Ukraine) Oksana Kozyna (Ukraine) Ivanna Redka	21–16	21–15	
17 August	Rosa De Marco (Italy); Emona Ivanova (Bulgaria)	1–2	(France) Lénaïg Morin (France) Milena Surreau	15–21	21–18	21–17
17 August	Emma Stoner (United Kingdom); Sophie van den Broek (Netherlands)	0–2	(Ukraine) Oksana Kozyna (Ukraine) Ivanna Redka	16–21	11–21	

== Elimination stage ==
Semi-finals
Coraline Bergeron (FRA); Maud Lefort (FRA)	21	21
Oksana Kozyna (UKR); Ivanna Redka (UKR)	7	10
1	Beatriz Monteiro (POR); Catherine Naudin (FRA)	24	9	18
Lénaïg Morin (FRA); Milena Surreau (FRA)	22	21	21

Final
Coraline Bergeron (FRA); Maud Lefort (FRA)	21	21
Lénaïg Morin (FRA); Milena Surreau (FRA)	14	10
