= Badminton at the 2023 European Para Championships =

- Venue: Rotterdam Ahoy
- Location: Rotterdam, Netherlands
- Start date: 15 August
- End date: 20 August
- Competitors: 135 from 26 nations

Badminton at the 2023 European Para Championships in Rotterdam, Netherlands, were held between 15 and 20 August 2023.

There were ten men's events, nine women's events, and three mixed doubles events. Badminton offers qualification ranking points for the men's and women's singles events players for the 2024 Summer Paralympics.

== Participant ==
Nation	Men									Women								Mixed			Total	Player
Nation	Singles						Doubles			Singles						Doubles		Doubles			Total	Player
Nation	WH1	WH2	SL3	SL4	SU5	SH6	WH1 WH2	SL3 SL4	SU5	WH1	WH2	SL3	SL4	SU5	SH6	WH1 WH2	SL3 SU5	WH1 WH2	SL3 SU5	SH6	Total	Player
Austria (AUT)										1								0.5			1.5	1
Azerbaijan (AZE)					1														0.5		1.5	1
Belgium (BEL)	1						0.5			1						0.5					3	3
Bulgaria (BUL)			1					0.5				1					0.5		1		4	2
Croatia (CRO)	1						0.5														1.5	1
Czech Republic (CZE)	5				1		2.5											1.5			10	8
Denmark (DEN)														1					0.5		1.5	1
Estonia (EST)			1																		1	1
Finland (FIN)			1							1			1			0.5		0.5			4	3
France (FRA)	2	1	2	7	2	3	1.5	2	3	1	1	2	3	1	1	1	2.5	0.5	3	1.5	41	26
Germany (GER)	1	1		3			1				1							0.5	1		8.5	7
Great Britain (GBR)	1	2	4	1	3	4	1.5	1.5	2		1	1	1		2	0.5	0.5	1.5	2.5	3	33	21
Hungary (HUN)				1																	1	1
Ireland (IRL)	2				1		1		0.5												4.5	3
Israel (ISR)	1	1					1			1						0.5					4.5	3
Italy (ITA)	2	1					1.5							1			0.5	0.5	0.5		7	4
Netherlands (NED) (H)				1	1								1	1			0.5		0.5		5	4
Norway (NOR)													1						0.5		1.5	1
Poland (POL)					1				0.5	2					2	1		1		1	8.5	5
Portugal (POR)				2					1				1	1			0.5		1.5		7	4
Serbia (SRB)		1				1															2	2
Spain (ESP)	1	1	1		2	1	1		1					1				1	1	0.5	11.5	7
Sweden (SWE)				2				1											0.5		3.5	2
Switzerland (SUI)		3	1	1			1	1		1	1					1		0.5	1		11.5	7
Turkey (TUR)			1	2	2	1		1.5	1	1	2	1	1	1		1	1	1	3		20.5	12
Ukraine (UKR)			1					0.5				1		1	2		1		1	1	8.5	5
Total	17	11	13	20	14	10	13	8	9	9	6	6	9	8	7	6	7	9	18	7	207	135

== Medalists ==
=== Medal table ===
* Host nation (Netherlands)

Rank	NOC	Gold	Silver	Bronze	Total
1	France (FRA)	7	5	9	21
2	Great Britain (GBR)	3	2.5	5.5	11
3	Germany (GER)	3	0	2	5
4	Turkey (TUR)	2.5	0	7.5	10
5	Switzerland (SUI)	1	3	1	5
6	Poland (POL)	1	2	1.5	4.5
7	Belgium (BEL)	1	0.5	0	1.5
7	Norway (NOR)	1	0.5	0	1.5
9	Spain (ESP)	0.5	0.5	0	1
10	Ukraine (UKR)	0	2	2.5	4.5
11	Sweden (SWE)	0	2	0.5	2.5
12	Denmark (DEN)	0	1	0	1
13	Israel (ISR)	0	0.5	4	4.5
14	Austria (AUT)	0	0.5	1	1.5
15	Portugal (POR)	0	0	2.5	2.5
16	Italy (ITA)	0	0	1.5	1.5
17	Bulgaria (BUL)	0	0	1	1
18	Czech Republic (CZE)	0	0	0.5	0.5
Totals (18 entries)		20	20	40	80

=== Singles ===
Event	Gold	Silver	Bronze
Men's singles WH1	Thomas Wandschneider; Germany	David Toupé; France	Yuri Ferrigno; Italy
Men's singles WH1	Thomas Wandschneider; Germany	David Toupé; France	Konstantin Afinogenov; Israel
Men's singles WH2	Rick Hellmann; Germany	Luca Olgiati; Switzerland	Thomas Jakobs; France
Men's singles WH2	Rick Hellmann; Germany	Luca Olgiati; Switzerland	Amir Levi; Israel
Men's singles SL3	Daniel Bethell; Great Britain	Oleksandr Chyrkov; Ukraine	William Smith; Great Britain
Men's singles SL3	Daniel Bethell; Great Britain	Oleksandr Chyrkov; Ukraine	Mathieu Thomas; France
Men's singles SL4	Lucas Mazur; France	Rickard Nilsson; Sweden	Diogo Daniel; Portugal
Men's singles SL4	Lucas Mazur; France	Rickard Nilsson; Sweden	Marcel Adam; Germany
Men's singles SU5	Méril Loquette; France	Bartłomiej Mróz; Poland	İlker Tuzcu; Turkey
Men's singles SU5	Méril Loquette; France	Bartłomiej Mróz; Poland	Robert Donald; Great Britain
Men's singles SH6	Jack Shephard; Great Britain	Charles Noakes; France	Isaac Maison; Great Britain
Men's singles SH6	Jack Shephard; Great Britain	Charles Noakes; France	Krysten Coombs; Great Britain
Women's singles WH1	Man-Kei To; Belgium	Cynthia Mathez; Switzerland	Nina Gorodetzky; Israel
Women's singles WH1	Man-Kei To; Belgium	Cynthia Mathez; Switzerland	Henriett Koósz; Austria
Women's singles WH2	Emine Seçkin; Turkey	Ilaria Renggli; Switzerland	Annika Schröder; Germany
Women's singles WH2	Emine Seçkin; Turkey	Ilaria Renggli; Switzerland	Narin Uluç; Turkey
Women's singles SL3	Halime Yıldız; Turkey	Oksana Kozyna; Ukraine	Coraline Bergeron; France
Women's singles SL3	Halime Yıldız; Turkey	Oksana Kozyna; Ukraine	Emona Ivanova; Bulgaria
Women's singles SL4	Helle Sofie Sagøy; Norway	Milena Surreau; France	Tuğçe Çelik; Turkey
Women's singles SL4	Helle Sofie Sagøy; Norway	Milena Surreau; France	Faustine Noël; France
Women's singles SU5	Maud Lefort; France	Cathrine Rosengren; Denmark	Beatriz Monteiro; Portugal
Women's singles SU5	Maud Lefort; France	Cathrine Rosengren; Denmark	Zehra Bağlar; Turkey
Women's singles SH6	Oliwia Szmigiel; Poland	Rachel Choong; Great Britain	Nina Kozlova; Ukraine
Women's singles SH6	Oliwia Szmigiel; Poland	Rachel Choong; Great Britain	Daria Bujnicka; Poland

=== Doubles ===
Event	Gold	Silver	Bronze
Men's doubles WH1–WH2	Germany (GER); Rick Hellmann; Thomas Wandschneider	France (FRA); Thomas Jakobs; David Toupé	Israel (ISR); Konstantin Afinogenov; Amir Levi
Men's doubles WH1–WH2	Germany (GER); Rick Hellmann; Thomas Wandschneider	France (FRA); Thomas Jakobs; David Toupé	Switzerland (SUI); Marc Elmer; Italy (ITA); Yuri Ferrigno
Men's doubles SL3–SL4	France (FRA); Guillaume Gailly; Mathieu Thomas	Sweden (SWE); Rickard Nilsson; Great Britain (GBR); William Smith	Turkey (TUR); Mustafa Tuğra Nur; Fuat Soruklu
Men's doubles SL3–SL4	France (FRA); Guillaume Gailly; Mathieu Thomas	Sweden (SWE); Rickard Nilsson; Great Britain (GBR); William Smith	Ukraine (UKR); Oleksandr Chyrkov; Sweden (SWE); Dilan Jacobsson
Men's doubles SU5	France (FRA); Méril Loquette; Lucas Mazur	Poland (POL); Bartłomiej Mróz; Great Britain (GBR); Jack Wilson	Great Britain (GBR); Robert Donald; Sean O'Sullivan
Men's doubles SU5	France (FRA); Méril Loquette; Lucas Mazur	Poland (POL); Bartłomiej Mróz; Great Britain (GBR); Jack Wilson	Turkey (TUR); Burak May; İlker Tuzcu
Women's doubles WH1–WH2	Switzerland (SUI); Cynthia Mathez; Ilaria Renggli	Israel (ISR); Nina Gorodetzky; Belgium (BEL); Man-Kei To	Turkey (TUR); Ebru Gökçen; Emine Seçkin
Women's doubles WH1–WH2	Switzerland (SUI); Cynthia Mathez; Ilaria Renggli	Israel (ISR); Nina Gorodetzky; Belgium (BEL); Man-Kei To	France (FRA); Agnieszka Glemp-Etavard; Marilou Maurel
Women's doubles SL3–SU5	France (FRA); Caroline Bergeron; Maud Lefort	France (FRA); Lénaïg Morin; Milena Surreau	Ukraine (UKR); Oksana Kozyna; Ivanna Redka
Women's doubles SL3–SU5	France (FRA); Caroline Bergeron; Maud Lefort	France (FRA); Lénaïg Morin; Milena Surreau	Portugal (POR); Beatriz Monteiro; France (FRA); Catherine Naudin
Mixed doubles WH1–WH2	Spain (ESP); Francisco Motero; Turkey (TUR); Narin Uluç	Spain (ESP); Ignacio Fernández; Austria (AUT); Henriett Koósz	Switzerland (SUI); Lars Porrenga; Turkey (TUR); Ebru Gökçen
Mixed doubles WH1–WH2	Spain (ESP); Francisco Motero; Turkey (TUR); Narin Uluç	Spain (ESP); Ignacio Fernández; Austria (AUT); Henriett Koósz	Czech Republic (CZE); Kamil Šnajdar; France (FRA); Marilou Maurel
Mixed doubles SL3–SU5	France (FRA); Lucas Mazur; Faustine Noël	Sweden (SWE); Rickard Nilsson; Norway (NOR); Helle Sofie Sagøy	France (FRA); Mathieu Thomas; Maud Lefort
Mixed doubles SL3–SU5	France (FRA); Lucas Mazur; Faustine Noël	Sweden (SWE); Rickard Nilsson; Norway (NOR); Helle Sofie Sagøy	France (FRA); Méril Loquette; Coraline Bergeron
Mixed doubles SH6	Great Britain (GBR); Jack Shephard; Rachel Choong	Great Britain (GBR); Krysten Coombs; Poland (POL); Oliwia Szmigiel	France (FRA); Charles Noakes; Elisa Bujnowskyj
Mixed doubles SH6	Great Britain (GBR); Jack Shephard; Rachel Choong	Great Britain (GBR); Krysten Coombs; Poland (POL); Oliwia Szmigiel	Great Britain (GBR); Andrew Davies; Poland (POL); Daria Bujnicka

== See also ==
- Badminton at the 2023 European Games
