= Manisha Ramadass =

Indian para-badminton player (born 2005)

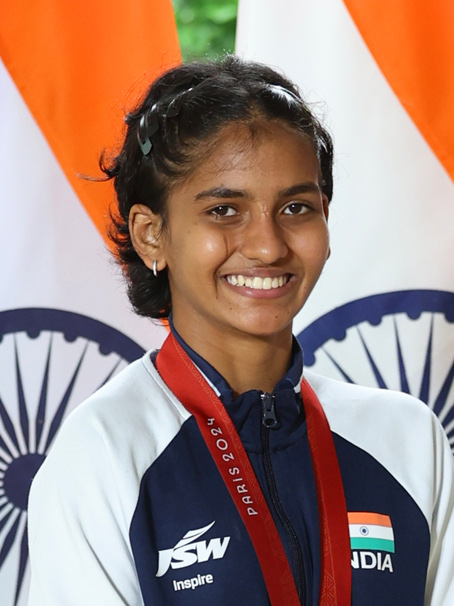
- Ramadass in September 2024

Personal information
- Born: 27 January 2005 (age 21) Thiruvallur, Tamil Nadu, India
- Years active: 2021–present

Sport
- Country: India
- Sport: Badminton
- Handedness: Left

Women's singles SU5 Women's doubles SL3–SU5
- Highest ranking: 1 (WS, 22 August 2022); 1 (WD with Mandeep Kaur, 6 July 2022); 2 (XD with Pramod Bhagat, 2 July 2026)
- Current ranking: 1 (WS, 25 August 2026); 12 (WD with Mandeep Kaur, 25 August 2026); 2 (XD with Pramod Bhagat, 25 August 2026)
Medal record
Women's para-badminton
Representing India
Paralympic Games
Bronze medal – third place	2024 Paris	Women's singles
World Championships
Gold medal – first place	2022 Tokyo	Women's singles
Silver medal – second place	2024 Pattaya	Women's singles
Silver medal – second place	2026 Manama	Women's singles
Bronze medal – third place	2022 Tokyo	Women's double's
Bronze medal – third place	2024 Pattaya	Women's doubles
Bronze medal – third place	2024 Pattaya	Mixed doubles
Asian Para Games
Bronze medal – third place	2022 Hangzhou	Women's singles
Bronze medal – third place	2022 Hangzhou	Women's doubles
Bronze medal – third place	2022 Hangzhou	Mixed doubles

Manisha Ramadass (born 27 January 2005) is an Indian para-badminton player. She is the current World number 1 in the Women's singles SU5 category. She won the bronze medal at the 2024 Summer Paralympics. She has won the gold, silver, and bronze medals at the World Championships, as well as three bronze medals at the Asian Para Games.

== Early life ==
Manisha is from Thiruvallur, Tamil Nadu. She is supported by Olympic Gold Quest, a sports NGO.

== Career ==
Manisha made her international debut in 2022 and became world number 1 in the SU5 category on 22 August 2022. She won her first title at the Spanish (level 2) Para-Badminton International in 2022. She went on to win 11 gold and five bronze medals in 2022.

== Awards ==
For her dominant performance, Ramadass won the BWF Female Para Badminton Player of the Year for the year 2022. She also won the Sportstar Aces Awards for the Sportswoman of the Year (parasports).

Award	Year	Category	Result	Ref.
BWF Awards	2022	Para-player of the Year	Won	
Arjuna Award	2025	Outstanding Performance in Sports	Won	

== Achievements ==
=== Paralympic Games ===
Women's singles SU5

Year	Venue	Opponent	Score	Result
2024	Porte de La Chapelle Arena, Paris, France	(Denmark) Cathrine Rosengren	21–12, 21–8	Bronze

=== World Championships ===
Women's singles

Year	Venue	Opponent	Score	Result
2022	Yoyogi National Gymnasium, Tokyo, Japan	(Japan) Mamiko Toyoda	21–15, 21–15	Gold
2024	Pattaya Exhibition and Convention Hall, Pattaya, Thailand	(China) Yang Qiuxia	16–21, 16–21	Silver
2026	Isa Sports City, Manama, Bahrain	(China) Yang Qiuxia	18–21, 17–21	Silver

Women's doubles

Year	Venue	Partner	Opponent	Score	Result
2022	Yoyogi National Gymnasium, Tokyo, Japan	(India) Mandeep Kaur	(France) Lénaïg Morin (France) Faustine Noël	17–21, 21–13, 18–21	Bronze
2024	Pattaya Exhibition and Convention Hall, Pattaya, Thailand	(India) Mandeep Kaur	(Indonesia) Leani Ratri Oktila (Indonesia) Khalimatus Sadiyah	19–21, 15–21	Bronze

Mixed doubles

Year	Venue	Partner	Opponent	Score	Result
2024	Pattaya Exhibition and Convention Hall, Pattaya, Thailand	(India) Pramod Bhagat	(Indonesia) Fredy Setiawan (Indonesia) Khalimatus Sadiyah	15–21, 19–21	Bronze

=== BWF Para Badminton World Circuit (22 titles, 9 runner-ups) ===
The BWF Para Badminton World Circuit – Grade 2, Level 1, 2 and 3 tournaments has been sanctioned by the Badminton World Federation from 2022.

Women's singles SU5

Year	Tournament	Level	Opponent	Score	Result
2022	Spanish Para Badminton International II	Level 2	(Portugal) Beatriz Monteiro	21–13, 21–10	(gold) Winner
2022	Brazil Para Badminton International	Level 2	(Japan) Kaede Kameyama	21–10, 21–11	(gold) Winner
2022	Dubai Para Badminton International	Level 2	(Japan) Akiko Sugino	21–17, 21–11	(gold) Winner
2022	Canada Para Badminton International	Level 1	(Japan) Akiko Sugino	27–25, 21–9	(gold) Winner
2022	Thailand Para Badminton International	Level 1	(Japan) Kaede Kameyama	20–22, 21–12, 21–19	(gold) Winner
2023	Spanish Para Badminton International	Level 2	(France) Maud Lefort	21–18, 15–10 RET	(gold) Winner
2024	Spanish Para Badminton International II	Level 2	(Denmark) Cathrine Rosengren	8–21, 21–17, 21–15	(gold) Winner
2024	Spanish Para Badminton International	Level 1	(India) Thulasimathi Murugesan	17–21, 13–21	(silver) Runner-up
2024	Bahrain Para Badminton International	Level 2	(Italy) Rosa De Marco	21–9, 21–14	(gold) Winner
2024	4 Nations Para Badminton International	Level 1	(India) Thulasimathi Murugesan	8–21, 14–21	(silver) Runner-up
2024	Japan Para Badminton International	Level 2	(Japan) Mamiko Toyoda	21–12, 21–18	(gold) Winner
2025	Spanish Para Badminton International	Level 1	(France) Maud Lefort	8–21, 21–17, 21–12	(gold) Winner
2025	British & Irish Para Badminton International	Level 1	(India) Thulasimathi Murugesan	21–18, 17–21, 16–21	(silver) Runner-up
2025	Indonesia Para Badminton International	Level 1	(India) Thulasimathi Murugesan	12–21, 22–20, 21–14	(gold) Winner
2025	Japan Para Badminton International	Level 2	(India) Thulasimathi Murugesan	15–21, 15–21	(silver) Runner-up
2026	Spanish Para Badminton International II	Level 2	(India) Thulasimathi Murugesan	17–21, 21–16, 21–15	(gold) Winner
2026	Spanish Para Badminton International	Level 1	(India) Thulasimathi Murugesan	14–21, 21–15, 14–21	(silver) Runner-up
2026	British & Irish Para Badminton International	Level 1	(India) Thulasimathi Murugesan	12–21, 19–21	(silver) Runner-up

Women's doubles SL3-SU5

Year	Tournament	Level	Partner	Opponent	Score	Result
2022	Spanish Para Badminton International II	Level 2	(India) Mandeep Kaur	(India) Manasi Girishchandra Joshi (India) Shanthiya Viswanathan	14–21, 23–21, 21–12	(gold) Winner
2022	Brazil Para Badminton International	Level 2	(India) Mandeep Kaur	(India) Palak Kohli (India) Parul Dalsukhbhai Parmar	21–15, 21–15	(gold) Winner
2022	Bahrain Para Badminton International	Level 2	(India) Mandeep Kaur	(India) Palak Kohli (India) Parul Dalsukhbhai Parmar	21–11, 21–11	(gold) Winner
2022	Dubai Para Badminton International	Level 2	(India) Mandeep Kaur	(Thailand) Nipada Saensupa (Thailand) Chanida Srinavakul	21–9, 21–13	(gold) Winner
2023	Brazil Para-Badminton International	Level 2	(India) Mandeep Kaur	(India) Manasi Girishchandra Joshi (India) Thulasimathi Murugesan	11–21, 10–21	(silver) Runner-up

Mixed doubles SL3-SU5

Year	Tournament	Level	Partner	Opponent	Score	Result
2022	Bahrain Para Badminton International	Level 2	(India) Pramod Bhagat	(Thailand) Siripong Teamarrom (Thailand) Nipada Saensupa	21–14, 21–11	(gold) Winner
2023	4 Nations Para Badminton International	Level 1	(India) Pramod Bhagat	(Indonesia) Hikmat Ramdani (Indonesia) Leani Ratri Oktila	17–21, 17–21	(silver) Runner-up
2025	Spanish Para Badminton International II	Level 2	(India) Kumar Nitesh	(Sweden) Rickard Nilsson (Norway) Helle Sofie Sagøy	21–9, 21–15	(gold) Winner
2025	Spanish Para Badminton International	Level 1	(India) Kumar Nitesh	(India) Naveen Sivakumar (India) Palak Kohli	21–14, 21–13	(gold) Winner
2025	Japan Para Badminton International	Level 2	(India) Pramod Bhagat	(India) Kumar Nitesh (India) Thulasimathi Murugesan	21–19, 21–19	(gold) Winner
2026	Spanish Para Badminton International II	Level 2	(India) Pramod Bhagat	(Brazil) Rogério de Oliveira (Brazil) Edwarda Dias	13–21, 21–12, 21–19	(gold) Winner
2026	Spanish Para Badminton International	Level 2	(India) Pramod Bhagat	(India) Kumar Nitesh (India) Thulasimathi Murugesan	21–15, 24–22	(gold) Winner
2026	French Para Badminton International	Level 2	(India) Pramod Bhagat	(Indonesia) Hikmat Ramdani (Indonesia) Leani Ratri Oktila	W/O	(silver) Runner-up
