= Badminton at the 2024 Summer Paralympics – Women's singles SU5 =

Badminton competition

Women's singles SU5 at the XVII Paralympic Games
- Venue: Arena Porte de La Chapelle, Paris
- Dates: 29 August 2024 – 2 September 2024
- Competitors: 9 from 7 nations

Medalists
1st place, gold medalist(s)		Yang Qiuxia	China
2nd place, silver medalist(s)		Thulasimathi Murugesan	India
3rd place, bronze medalist(s)		Manisha Ramadass	India

The women's singles SU5 tournament at the 2024 Summer Paralympics in France will take place between 29 August and 2 September 2024 at Arena Porte de La Chapelle.

== Classification ==
- SU5
  Players have impairment of the upper limbs.

== Seeds ==
These were the seeds for this event:

1. Thulasimathi Murugesan (IND) (final, silver medalist)
2. Manisha Ramadass (IND) (semifinals, bronze medalist)
3. Cathrine Rosengren (DEN) (semifinals)

== Group stage ==
The draw of the group stage revealed on 24 August 2024. The group stage will be played from 29 to 31 August. The top two winners of each group advanced to the knockout rounds.

=== Group A ===
Pos	Team	Pld	W	L	GF	GA	GD	PF	PA	PD	Pts	Qualification
1	Thulasimathi Murugesan (IND)	2	2	0	4	0	+4	84	40	+44	2	Semi-finals
2	Beatriz Monteiro (POR)	2	1	1	2	2	0	62	67	−5	1	Quarter-finals
3	Rosa De Marco (ITA)	2	0	2	0	4	−4	45	84	−39	0	

First match(es) will be played: 29 August 2024. Source: COJOP2024

Date	Time	Player 1	Score	Player 2	Set 1	Set 2	Set 3	Report
Aug 29	14:13	Thulasimathi Murugesan (India)	2–0	(Italy) Rosa De Marco	21–9	21–11	—N/a	Report
Aug 30	16:38	Thulasimathi Murugesan (India)	2–0	(Portugal) Beatriz Monteiro	21–12	21–8	—N/a	Report
Aug 31	17:25	Rosa De Marco (Italy)	0–2	(Portugal) Beatriz Monteiro	14–21	11–21	—N/a	Report

=== Group B ===
Pos	Team	Pld	W	L	GF	GA	GD	PF	PA	PD	Pts	Qualification
1	Cathrine Rosengren (DEN)	2	2	0	4	0	+4	84	44	+40	2	Quarter-finals
2	Mamiko Toyoda (JPN)	2	1	1	2	2	0	70	77	−7	1	Quarter-finals
3	Kaede Kameyama (JPN)	2	0	2	0	4	−4	51	84	−33	0	

First match(es) will be played: 29 August 2024. Source: COJOP2024

Date	Time	Player 1	Score	Player 2	Set 1	Set 2	Set 3	Report
Aug 29	16:05	Kaede Kameyama (Japan)	0–2	(Japan) Mamiko Toyoda	19–21	16–21	—N/a	Report
Aug 30	16:04	Cathrine Rosengren (Denmark)	2–0	(Japan) Kaede Kameyama	21–6	21–10	—N/a	Report
Aug 31	16:54	Cathrine Rosengren (Denmark)	2–0	(Japan) Mamiko Toyoda	21–17	21–11	—N/a	Report

=== Group C ===
Pos	Team	Pld	W	L	GF	GA	GD	PF	PA	PD	Pts	Qualification
1	Yang Qiuxia (CHN)	2	2	0	4	1	+3	93	59	+34	2	Semi-finals
2	Manisha Ramadass (IND)	2	1	1	2	3	−1	72	88	−16	1	Quarter-finals
3	Maud Lefort (FRA)	2	0	2	2	4	−2	83	101	−18	0	

First match(es) will be played: 29 August 2024. Source: COJOP2024

Date	Time	Player 1	Score	Player 2	Set 1	Set 2	Set 3	Report
Aug 29	16:03	Manisha Ramadass (India)	2–1	(France) Maud Lefort	8–21	21–6	21–19	Report
Aug 30	17:25	Maud Lefort (France)	1–2	(China) Yang Qiuxia	21–9	4–21	12–21	Report
Aug 31	12:51	Manisha Ramadass (India)	0–2	(China) Yang Qiuxia	15–21	7–21	—N/a	Report

== Finals ==
The knockout stage will be played from 1 to 2 September.

Quarter-finals
B2	Mamiko Toyoda (JPN)	13	16	-
C2	Manisha Ramadass (IND)	21	21	-
A2	Beatriz Monteiro (POR)	19	10	-
B1	Cathrine Rosengren (DEN)	21	21	-

Semi-finals
A1	Thulasimathi Murugesan (IND)	23	21	-
C2	Manisha Ramadass (IND)	21	17	-
B1	Cathrine Rosengren (DEN)	14	14	-
C1	Yang Qiuxia (CHN)	21	21	-

Gold medal match
A1	Thulasimathi Murugesan (IND) (silver)	17	10	-
C1	Yang Qiuxia (CHN) (gold)	21	21	-
Bronze medal match
C2	Manisha Ramadass (IND) (bronze)	21	21	-
B1	Cathrine Rosengren (DEN)	12	8	-

=== Quarter-finals ===
Date	Time	Player 1	Score	Player 2	Set 1	Set 2	Set 3	Report
Sep 1	9:56	Mamiko Toyoda (Japan)	0–2	(India) Manisha Ramadass	13–21	16–21	—N/a	Report
Sep 1	17:25	Beatriz Monteiro (Portugal)	0–2	(Denmark) Cathrine Rosengren	19–21	10–21	—N/a	Report

=== Semi-finals ===
Date	Time	Player 1	Score	Player 2	Set 1	Set 2	Set 3	Report
Sep 1	22:25	Cathrine Rosengren (Denmark)	0–2	(China) Yang Qiuxia	14–21	14–21	—N/a	Report
Sep 1	22:33	Thulasimathi Murugesan (India)	2–0	(India) Manisha Ramadass	23–21	21–17	—N/a	Report

=== Bronze medal match ===
Date	Time	Player 1	Score	Player 2	Set 1	Set 2	Set 3	Report
Sep 2	16:33	Manisha Ramadass (India)	2–0	(Denmark) Cathrine Rosengren	21–12	21–8	—N/a	Report

=== Gold medal match ===
Date	Time	Player 1	Score	Player 2	Set 1	Set 2	Set 3	Report
Sep 2	16:32	Thulasimathi Murugesan (India)	0–2	(China) Yang Qiuxia	17–21	10–21	—N/a	Report
