= Badminton at the 2023 European Para Championships – Women's singles SU5 =

SU5 women's badminton tournament in 2023

Badminton's women's singles SU5 at the 2023 European Para Championships
- Venue: Rotterdam Ahoy, Rotterdam
- Dates: 15 – 20 August
- Competitors: 8 from 8 nations

Medalists
gold medal	Maud Lefort	France
silver medal	Cathrine Rosengren	Denmark
bronze medal	Beatriz Monteiro	Portugal
bronze medal	Zehra Bağlar	Turkey

The women's singles SU5 badminton tournament at the 2023 European Para Championships was played from 15 to 20 August 2023 in Rotterdam Ahoy, Rotterdam. A total of 8 players competed at the tournament, two of whom was seeded.

== Competition schedule ==
Play took place between 15 and 20 August.

GS	Group stage	½	Semifinals	F	Final

Events	Tue 15	Wed 16	Thu 17	Fri 18	Sat 19	Sun 20
Women's singles SU5	GS	GS	GS		½	F

== Seeds ==
The following players were seeded:

1. Cathrine Rosengren (DEN) (final; silver medalist)
2. Maud Lefort (FRA) (champion; gold medalist)

== Group stage ==
=== Group A ===
Pos	Team	Pld	W	L	GF	GA	GD	PF	PA	PD	Qualification
1	Cathrine Rosengren (DEN) [1]	3	3	0	6	0	+6	126	65	+61	Qualification to elimination stage
2	Zehra Bağlar (TUR)	3	2	1	4	2	+2	109	69	+40	Qualification to elimination stage
3	Ivanna Redka (UKR)	3	1	2	2	4	−2	76	105	−29	
4	Cristina Sánchez (ESP)	3	0	3	0	6	−6	54	126	−72	

Source: Group A – standings

Date		Score		Game 1	Game 2	Game 3
15 August	Cristina Sánchez (Spain)	0–2	(Turkey) Zehra Bağlar	4–21	9–21	
15 August	Cathrine Rosengren (Denmark)	2–0	(Ukraine) Ivanna Redka	21–10	21–10	
16 August	Cathrine Rosengren (Denmark)	2–0	(Spain) Cristina Sánchez	21–8	21–12	
16 August	Ivanna Redka (Ukraine)	0–2	(Turkey) Zehra Bağlar	8–21	6–21	
17 August	Ivanna Redka (Ukraine)	2–0	(Spain) Cristina Sánchez	21–13	21–8	
17 August	Cathrine Rosengren (Denmark)	2–0	(Turkey) Zehra Bağlar	21–16	21–19	

=== Group B ===
Pos	Team	Pld	W	L	GF	GA	GD	PF	PA	PD	Qualification
1	Maud Lefort (FRA) [2]	3	3	0	6	0	+6	126	86	+40	Qualification to elimination stage
2	Beatriz Monteiro (POR)	3	2	1	4	2	+2	117	97	+20	Qualification to elimination stage
3	Meike de Kraa (NED)	3	1	2	2	4	−2	99	113	−14	
4	Rosa De Marco (ITA)	3	0	3	0	6	−6	80	126	−46	

Source: Group B – standings

Date		Score		Game 1	Game 2	Game 3
15 August	Maud Lefort (France)	2–0	(Italy) Rosa De Marco	21–15	21–11	
15 August	Beatriz Monteiro (Portugal)	2–0	(Netherlands) Meike de Kraa	21–19	21–11	
16 August	Rosa De Marco (Italy)	0–2	(Netherlands) Meike de Kraa	16–21	13–21	
16 August	Maud Lefort (France)	2–0	(Portugal) Beatriz Monteiro	21–18	21–15	
17 August	Rosa De Marco (Italy)	0–2	(Portugal) Beatriz Monteiro	12–21	13–21	
17 August	Maud Lefort (France)	2–0	(Netherlands) Meike de Kraa	21–15	21–12	

== Elimination stage ==
Semi-finals
1	Cathrine Rosengren (DEN)	21	21
Beatriz Monteiro (POR)	16	19
Zehra Bağlar (TUR)	6	9
2	Maud Lefort (FRA)	21	21

Final
1	Cathrine Rosengren (DEN)	15	14
2	Maud Lefort (FRA)	21	21
