= Badminton at the 2023 European Para Championships – Mixed doubles WH1–WH2 =

Badminton's mixed doubles WH1–WH2 at the 2023 European Para Championships
- Venue: Rotterdam Ahoy, Rotterdam
- Dates: 15 – 20 August
- Competitors: 18 from 11 nations

Medalists
gold medal	Francisco Motero; Narin Uluç	Mixed-NOCs
silver medal	Ignacio Fernández; Henriett Koósz	Mixed-NOCs
bronze medal	Lars Porrenga; Ebru Gökçen	Mixed-NOCs
bronze medal	Kamil Šnajdar; Marilou Maurel	Mixed-NOCs

The mixed doubles WH1–WH2 badminton tournament at the 2023 European Para Championships was played from 15 to 20 August 2023 in Rotterdam Ahoy, Rotterdam. A total of 9 pairs competed at the tournament, three of whom was seeded.

== Competition schedule ==
Play took place between 15 and 20 August.

GS	Group stage	¼	Quarterfinals	½	Semifinals	F	Final

Events	Tue 15	Wed 16	Thu 17	Fri 18	Sat 19	Sun 20
Mixed doubles WH1–WH2	GS	GS	GS	¼	½	F

== Seeds ==
The following players were seeded:

1. Ignacio Fernández (ESP) / Henriett Koósz (AUT) (final; silver medlaist)
2. (withdrew)
3. Gobi Ranganathan (GBR) / Heidi Manninen (FIN) (quarter-finals)

== Group stage ==
=== Group A ===
Pos	Team	Pld	W	L	GF	GA	GD	PF	PA	PD	Qualification
1	Ignacio Fernández (ESP) Henriett Koósz (AUT) [1]	2	2	0	4	0	+4	84	36	+48	Qualification to elimination stage
2	Lars Porrenga (SUI) Ebru Gökçen (TUR)	2	1	1	2	3	−1	83	93	−10	Qualification to elimination stage
3	Owen Kilburn (GBR) Sharon Jones-Barnes (GBR)	2	0	2	1	4	−3	65	103	−38	

Source: Group A – standings

Date		Score		Game 1	Game 2	Game 3
15 August	Lars Porrenga (Switzerland); Ebru Gökçen (Turkey)	2–1	(United Kingdom) Owen Kilburn (United Kingdom) Sharon Jones-Barnes	19–21	21–17	21–13
16 August	Ignacio Fernández (Spain); Henriett Koósz (Austria)	2–0	(Switzerland) Lars Porrenga (Turkey) Ebru Gökçen	21–12	21–10	
17 August	Ignacio Fernández (Spain); Henriett Koósz (Austria)	2–0	(United Kingdom) Owen Kilburn (United Kingdom) Sharon Jones-Barnes	21–5	21–9	

=== Group B ===
Pos	Team	Pld	W	L	GF	GA	GD	PF	PA	PD	Qualification
1	Kamil Šnajdar (CZE) Marilou Maurel (FRA) [SUB]	2	2	0	4	0	+4	84	41	+43	Qualification to elimination stage
2	Jan Matoušek (CZE) Natalia Grzyb (POL)	2	1	1	2	2	0	63	78	−15	Qualification to elimination stage
3	Vincenco Contemi (ITA) Annika Schröder (GER)	2	0	2	0	4	−4	56	84	−28	

Source: Group B – standings

Date		Score		Game 1	Game 2	Game 3
15 August	Jan Matoušek (Czech Republic); Natalia Grzyb (Poland)	2–0	(Italy) Vincenco Contemi (Germany) Annika Schröder	21–17	21–19	
16 August	Kamil Šnajdar (Czech Republic); Marilou Maurel (France)	2–0	(Czech Republic) Jan Matoušek (Poland) Natalia Grzyb	21–8	21–13	
17 August	Kamil Šnajdar (Czech Republic); Marilou Maurel (France)	2–0	(Italy) Vincenco Contemi (Germany) Annika Schröder	21–11	21–9	

=== Group C ===
Pos	Team	Pld	W	L	GF	GA	GD	PF	PA	PD	Qualification
1	Francisco Motero (ESP) Narin Uluç (TUR)	2	2	0	4	0	+4	84	32	+52	Qualification to elimination stage
2	Gobi Ranganathan (GBR) Heidi Manninen (FIN) [3]	2	1	1	2	3	−1	81	93	−12	Qualification to elimination stage
3	Lukáš Kyncl (CZE) Anna Wolny (POL)	2	0	2	1	4	−3	63	103	−40	

Source: Group C – standings

Date		Score		Game 1	Game 2	Game 3
15 August	Francisco Motero (Spain); Narin Uluç (Turkey)	2–0	(Czech Republic) Lukáš Kyncl (Poland) Anna Wolny	21–5	21–7	
16 August	Gobi Ranganathan (United Kingdom); Heidi Manninen (Finland)	0–2	(Spain) Francisco Motero (Turkey) Narin Uluç	9–21	11–21	
17 August	Gobi Ranganathan (United Kingdom); Heidi Manninen (Finland)	1–2	(Czech Republic) Lukáš Kyncl (Poland) Anna Wolny	19–21	21–16	21–14

== Elimination stage ==
Quarter-finals
Jan Matoušek (CZE); Natalia Grzyb (POL)	21	14	15
Lars Porrenga (SUI); Ebru Gökçen (TUR)	18	21	21
3	Gobi Ranganathan (GBR); Heidi Manninen (FIN)	9	10
Francisco Motero (ESP); Narin Uluç (TUR)	21	21

Semi-finals
1	Ignacio Fernández (ESP); Henriett Koósz (AUT)	21	21
Lars Porrenga (SUI); Ebru Gökçen (TUR)	18	15
Francisco Motero (ESP); Narin Uluç (TUR)	21	21
2	Kamil Šnajdar (CZE); Marilou Maurel (FRA)	11	6

Final
1	Ignacio Fernández (ESP); Henriett Koósz (AUT)	16	17
Francisco Motero (ESP); Narin Uluç (TUR)	21	21
