= Badminton at the 2023 European Para Championships – Women's doubles WH1–WH2 =

Badminton's women's doubles WH1–WH2 at the 2023 European Para Championships
- Venue: Rotterdam Ahoy, Rotterdam
- Dates: 15 – 20 August
- Competitors: 12 from 8 nations

Medalists
gold medal	Cynthia Mathez; Ilaria Renggli	Switzerland
silver medal	Nina Gorodetzky; Man-Kei To	Mixed-NOCs
bronze medal	Ebru Gökçen; Emine Seçkin	Turkey
bronze medal	Agnieszka Glemp-Etavard; Marilou Maurel	France

The women's doubles WH1–WH2 badminton tournament at the 2023 European Para Championships was played from 15 to 20 August 2023 in Rotterdam Ahoy, Rotterdam. A total of 6 pairs competed at the tournament, two of whom was seeded.

== Competition schedule ==
Play took place between 15 and 20 August.

GS	Group stage	½	Semifinals	F	Final

Events	Tue 15	Wed 16	Thu 17	Fri 18	Sat 19	Sun 20
Women's doubles WH1–WH2	GS	GS	GS		½	F

== Seeds ==
The following players were seeded:

1. Cynthia Mathez / Ilaria Renggli (SUI) (champion; gold medalist)
2. Ebru Gökçen / Emine Seçkin (TUR) (semi-finals; bronze medalist)

== Group stage ==
=== Group A ===
Pos	Team	Pld	W	L	GF	GA	GD	PF	PA	PD	Qualification
1	Cynthia Mathez (SUI) Ilaria Renggli (SUI) [1]	2	2	0	4	0	+4	84	19	+65	Qualification to elimination stage
2	Agnieszka Glemp-Etavard (FRA) Marilou Maurel (FRA)	2	1	1	2	2	0	54	71	−17	Qualification to elimination stage
3	Sharon Jones-Barnes (GBR) Heidi Manninen (FIN)	2	0	2	0	4	−4	36	84	−48	

Source: Group A – standings

Date		Score		Game 1	Game 2	Game 3
15 August	Agnieszka Glemp-Etavard (France); Marilou Maurel (France)	2–0	(United Kingdom) Sharon Jones-Barnes (Finland) Heidi Manninen	21–13	21–16	
16 August	Cynthia Mathez (Switzerland); Ilaria Renggli (Switzerland)	2–0	(France) Agnieszka Glemp-Etavard (France) Marilou Maurel	21–5	21–7	
17 August	Cynthia Mathez (Switzerland); Ilaria Renggli (Switzerland)	2–0	(United Kingdom) Sharon Jones-Barnes (Finland) Heidi Manninen	21–3	21–4	

=== Group B ===
Pos	Team	Pld	W	L	GF	GA	GD	PF	PA	PD	Qualification
1	Nina Gorodetzky (ISR) Man-Kei To (BEL)	2	2	0	4	0	+4	84	27	+57	Qualification to elimination stage
2	Ebru Gökçen (TUR) Emine Seçkin (TUR) [2]	2	1	1	2	3	−1	82	93	−11	Qualification to elimination stage
3	Natalia Grzyb (POL) Anna Wolny (POL)	2	0	2	1	4	−3	60	106	−46	

Source: Group B – standings

Date		Score		Game 1	Game 2	Game 3
15 August	Natalia Grzyb (Poland); Anna Wolny (Poland)	0–2	(Israel) Nina Gorodetzky (Belgium) Man-Kei To	4–21	5–21	
16 August	Ebru Gökçen (Turkey); Emine Seçkin (Turkey)	2–1	(Poland) Natalia Grzyb (Poland) Anna Wolny	21–10	22–24	21–17
17 August	Ebru Gökçen (Turkey); Emine Seçkin (Turkey)	0–2	(Israel) Nina Gorodetzky (Belgium) Man-Kei To	10–21	8–21	

== Elimination stage ==
Semi-finals
1	Cynthia Mathez (SUI); Ilaria Renggli (SUI)	21	21
2	Ebru Gökçen (TUR); Emine Seçkin (TUR)	7	12
Agnieszka Glemp-Etavard (FRA); Marilou Maurel (FRA)	6	6
Nina Gorodetzky (ISR); Man-Kei To (BEL)	21	21

Final
1	Cynthia Mathez (SUI); Ilaria Renggli (SUI)	11	21	21
Nina Gorodetzky (ISR); Man-Kei To (BEL)	21	13	11
