= Yang Qiuxia (badminton) =

Chinese para-badminton player (born 1998)

Yang Qiuxia 杨秋霞
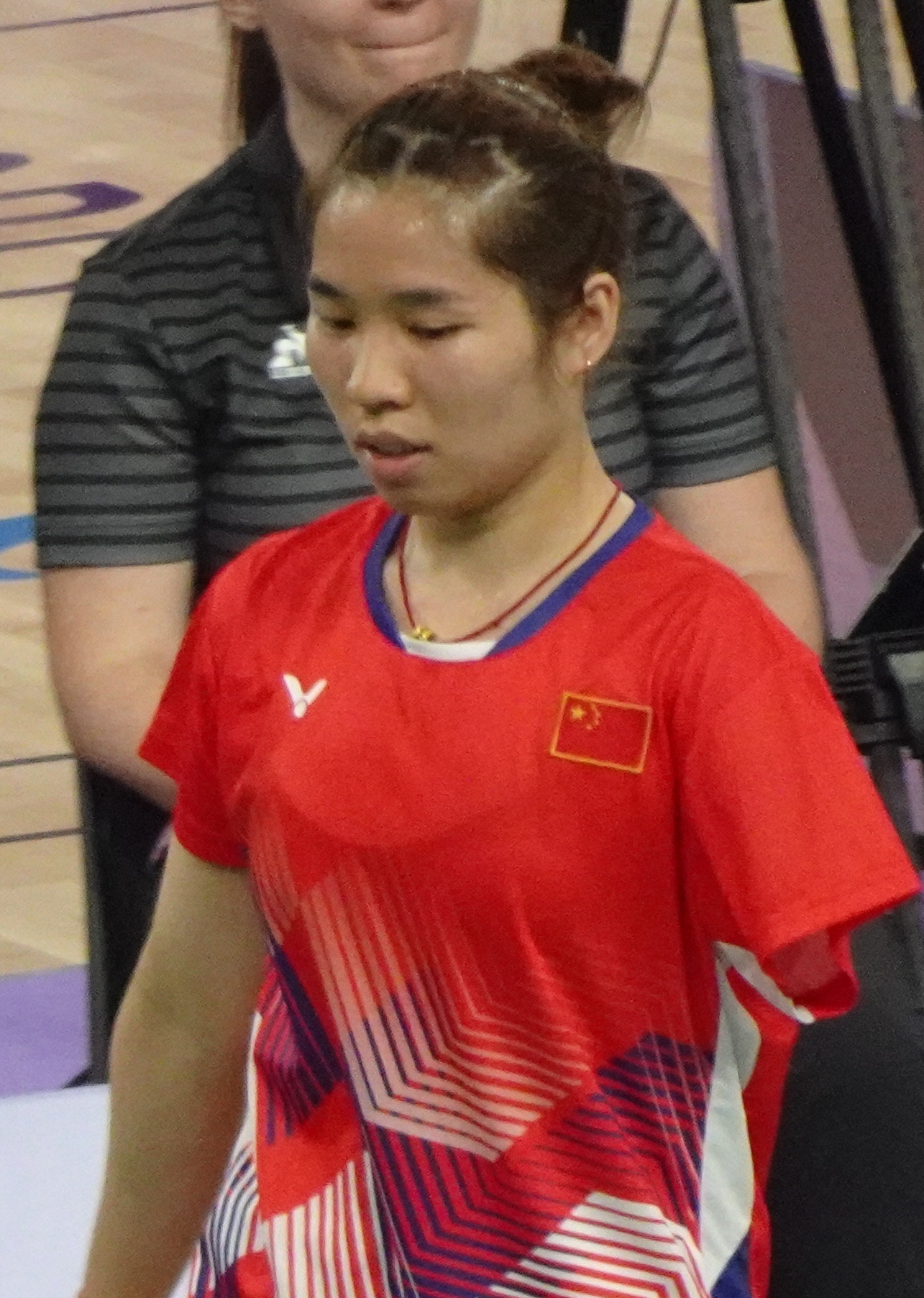
- Yang at the 2024 Summer Paralympics

Personal information
- Born: 7 July 1998 (age 27) Pingtang County, Guizhou, China

Sport
- Country: China
- Sport: Badminton
- Coached by: Zhang Xianmin

Women's singles SU5
- Highest ranking: 1 (17 November 2019)
- Current ranking: 11 (8 November 2022)
Medal record
Women's para-badminton
Representing China
Paralympic Games
Gold medal – first place	2020 Tokyo	Women's singles
Gold medal – first place	2024 Paris	Women's singles
World Championships
Gold medal – first place	2019 Basel	Women's singles
Gold medal – first place	2024 Pattaya	Women's singles
Gold medal – first place	2026 Manama	Women's singles
Gold medal – first place	2026 Manama	Women's doubles
Silver medal – second place	2017 Ulsan	Women's singles
Silver medal – second place	2017 Ulsan	Mixed doubles
Silver medal – second place	2026 Manama	Mixed doubles
Bronze medal – third place	2024 Pattaya	Women's doubles
Asian Para Games
Gold medal – first place	2018 Jakarta	Women's singles
Silver medal – second place	2022 Hangzhou	Women's singles
Bronze medal – third place	2018 Jakarta	Women's doubles
Bronze medal – third place	2022 Hangzhou	Women's doubles
Asian Championships
Gold medal – first place	2016 Beijing	Women's singles
Asian Youth Para Games
Gold medal – first place	2017 Dubai	Women's singles

Yang Qiuxia (Chinese: 杨秋霞; pinyin: Yáng Qiūxiá; born 7 July 1998) is a Chinese para-badminton player. She represented China at the 2020 Summer Paralympics and won a gold in the women's singles SU5 event.

== Achievements ==
=== Paralympic Games ===
Women's singles SU5

Year	Venue	Opponent	Score	Result
2020	Yoyogi National Gymnasium, Tokyo, Japan	(Japan) Ayako Suzuki	21–17, 21–9	Gold
2024	Paris, France	(India) Thulasimathi Murugesan	21-17, 21-10	Gold

=== World Championships ===
Women's singles

Year	Venue	Opponent	Score	Result
2017	Dongchun Gymnasium, Ulsan, South Korea	(Japan) Ayako Suzuki	21–18, 18–21, 18–21	Silver
2019	St. Jakobshalle, Basel, Switzerland	(Japan) Ayako Suzuki	17–21, 21–17, 21–15	Gold
2024	Pattaya Exhibition and Convention Hall, Pattaya, Thailand	(India) Manisha Ramadass	21–16, 21–16	Gold

Women’s doubles

Year	Venue	Partner	Opponent	Score	Result
2024	Pattaya Exhibition and Convention Hall, Pattaya, Thailand	(China) Xiao Zuxian	(India) Manasi Joshi (India) Thulasimathi Murugesan	13–21, 20–22	Bronze

Mixed doubles

Year	Venue	Partner	Opponent	Score	Result
2017	Dongchun Gymnasium, Ulsan, South Korea	(China) Yang Jianyuan	(Indonesia) Hary Susanto (Indonesia) Leani Ratri Oktila	14–21, 14–21	Silver

=== Asian Para Games ===
Women's singles

Year	Venue	Opponent	Score	Result
2018	Istora Gelora Bung Karno, Jakarta, Indonesia	(Japan) Ayako Suzuki	21–16, 21–16	Gold

Women's doubles

Year	Venue	Partner	Opponent	Score	Result
2018	Istora Gelora Bung Karno, Jakarta, Indonesia	(China) Xiao Zuxian	(China) Cheng Hefang (China) Ma Huihui	10–21, 1–21	Bronze

=== Asian Championships ===
Women's singles

Year	Venue	Opponent	Score	Result
2016	China Administration of Sport for Persons with Disabilities, Beijing, China	(Japan) Ayako Suzuki	17–21, 21–11, 21–9	Gold

=== Asian Youth Para Games ===
Women's singles

Year	Venue	Opponent	Score	Result
2017	Al Wasl Club, Dubai, United Arab Emirates	(China) Li Tongtong	17–21, 21–14, 21–10	Gold

=== International Tournaments (4 titles, 3 runners-up) ===
Women's singles

Year	Tournament	Opponent	Score	Result
2017	Japan Para Badminton International	(Japan) Ayako Suzuki	21–8, 13–21, 18–21	(silver) Runner-up
2019	Turkish Para Badminton International	(Denmark) Cathrine Rosengren	21–23, 21–8, 21–9	(gold) Winner
2019	Dubai Para Badminton International	(Japan) Ayako Suzuki	21–18, 21–13	(gold) Winner
2019	China Para Badminton International	(Japan) Ayako Suzuki	21–14, 19–21, 21–19	(gold) Winner
2019	Japan Para Badminton International	(Japan) Ayako Suzuki	19–21, 20–22	(silver) Runner-up
2020	Brazil Para Badminton International	(China) Li Tongtong	17–21, 23–25	(silver) Runner-up

Women's doubles

Year	Tournament	Partner	Opponent	Score	Result
2017	Japan Para Badminton International	(India) Manasi Girishchandra Joshi	(Norway) Helle Sofie Sagøy (Germany) Katrin Seibert	23–21, 21–15	(gold) Winner
