= Cynthia Mathez =

Swiss para-badminton player

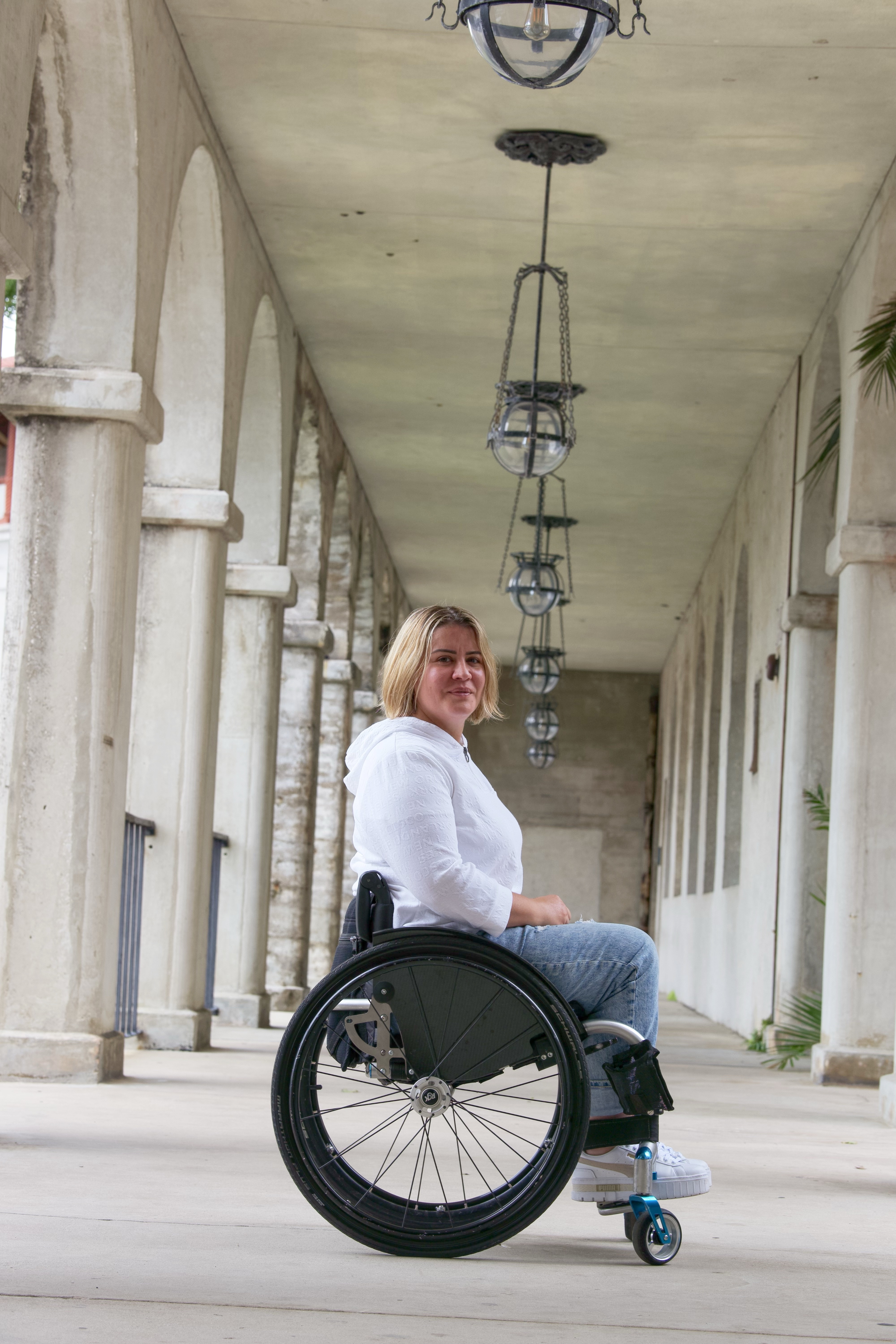
- Cynthia Mathez in 2023

Personal information
- Born: 10 October 1985 (age 41) Biel, Switzerland
- Height: 154 cm (5 ft 1 in)

Sport
- Country: Switzerland
- Sport: Badminton
- Handedness: Right
- Coached by: Yu Yu Wang

Women's singles WH1 Women's doubles WH1–WH2
- Highest ranking: 2 (WS 2 October 2022); 3 (WD with Ilaria Renggli 8 November 2022)
- Current ranking: 3 (WS); 3 (WD with Ilaria Renggli) (8 November 2022)
- BWF profile
Medal record
Para badminton
Representing Switzerland
World Championships
Silver medal – second place	2022 Tokyo	Women's singles
Bronze medal – third place	2022 Tokyo	Women's doubles
Bronze medal – third place	2026 Manama	Women's doubles
European Championships
Gold medal – first place	2018 Rodez	Women's doubles
European Para Championships
Gold medal – first place	2023 Rotterdam	Women's doubles
Silver medal – second place	2023 Rotterdam	Women's singles

Cynthia Mathez (born 10 October 1985) is a Swiss para-badminton player who competes in the WH1 category. Mathez is part of the Swiss national para-badminton team and won gold at the European Para Badminton Championships with her doubles partner Ilaria Renggli in Rotherdam in 2023. She competed in the 2020 Summer Paralympics in Tokyo and 2024 in Paris.

== Career ==
Mathez was initially active as a judoka, rugby player and racing driver. In 2009, she was diagnosed with multiple sclerosis and since 2015, she has been reliant on a wheelchair. She initially wanted to compete in wheelchair rugby, but her doctors expressed concerns. Then she turned to para-badminton.

In 2017, Mathez first took part in a BWF Para-Badminton World Championships in Ulsan and reached the quarter-finals in doubles with Karin Suter-Erath. In mixed doubles, she was eliminated from the group stage with Christian Hamböck. In 2018, she was successful at the European Championships in Rodez and won gold in doubles with Karin Suter-Erath, while in singles, she was eliminated in the quarter-finals. At the 2019 World Championship in Basel, she was eliminated in the women's and mixed doubles in the group stage.

Mathez participated in the 2020 Summer Paralympics in the women's singles WH1 and women's doubles WH1–WH2 events. At the 2022 Winter Paralympics in Beijing, she took part as the lead for the Swiss curling team.

== Achievements ==
=== World Championships ===
Women's singles
Year	Venue	Opponent	Score	Result
2022	Yoyogi National Gymnasium; Tokyo, Japan	(Japan) Sarina Satomi	9–21, 10–21	Silver

Women's doubles
Year	Venue	Partner	Opponent	Score	Result
2022	Yoyogi National Gymnasium, Tokyo, Japan	(Switzerland) Ilaria Renggli	(Turkey) Emine Seçkin (Belgium) Man-Kei To	21–12, 10–21, 14–21	Bronze
2026	Isa Sports City, Manama, Bahrain	(Switzerland) Ilaria Renggli	(China) Liu Yutong (China) Yin Menglu	4–15, 4–21	Bronze

=== European Championships ===
Women's doubles
Year	Venue	Partner	Opponent	Score	Result
2018	Amphitheatre Gymnasium; Rodez, France	(Switzerland) Karin Suter-Erath	(Turkey) Emine Seçkin (Belgium) Man-Kei To	21–18, 21–14	Gold

=== BWF Para Badminton World Circuit (8 runners-up) ===
The BWF Para Badminton World Circuit – Grade 2, Level 1, 2 and 3 tournaments has been sanctioned by the Badminton World Federation from 2022.

Women's singles
Year	Tournament	Level	Opponent	Score	Result
2022	Bahrain Para Badminton International	Level 2	(Japan) Sarina Satomi	12–21, 9–21	(silver) Runner-up
2022	Dubai Para Badminton International	Level 2	(South Korea) Kwon Hyun-ah	12–21, 19–21	(silver) Runner-up
2022	4 Nations Para Badminton International	Level 1	(Japan) Sarina Satomi	10–21, 14–21	(silver) Runner-up
2022	Thailand Para Badminton International	Level 1	(Japan) Sarina Satomi	13–21, 8–21	(silver) Runner-up
2023	Brazil Para Badminton International	Level 2	(Belgium) Man-Kei To	16–21, 16–21	(silver) Runner-up

Women's doubles
Year	Tournament	Level	Partner	Opponent	Score	Result
2022	Dubai Para Badminton International	Level 2	(Switzerland) Ilaria Renggli	(South Korea) Jung Gyeo-ul (South Korea) Kwon Hyun-ah	14–21, 14–21	(silver) Runner-up
2023	Spanish Para Badminton International II	Level 2	(Switzerland) Ilaria Renggli	(Japan) Sarina Satomi (Japan) Yuma Yamazaki	12–21, 13–21	(silver) Runner-up
2023	Brazil Para Badminton International	Level 2	(Switzerland) Ilaria Renggli	(South Korea) Jung Gyeo-ul (South Korea) Kwon Hyun-ah	18–21, 19–21	(silver) Runner-up

=== International Tournaments (1 title, 6 runners-up) ===
Women's singles
Year	Tournament	Opponent	Score	Result
2021	Dubai Para Badminton International	(Switzerland) Karin Suter-Erath	16–21, 19–21	(silver) Runner-up

Women's doubles

Year	Tournament	Partner	Opponent	Score	Result
2017	Irish Para Badminton International	(Switzerland) Karin Suter-Erath	(Thailand) Sujirat Pookkham (Thailand) Amnouy Wetwithan	8–21, 10–21	(silver) Runner-up
2021 (Note: This tournament uses a round robin system.)	Dubai Para Badminton International	(Switzerland) Karin Suter-Erath	(Egypt) Shaimaa Samy Abdellatif (Russia) Tatiana Gureeva	21–10, 21–17	(silver) Runner-up
2021	Dubai Para Badminton International	(Switzerland) Karin Suter-Erath	(Turkey) Emine Seçkin (Belgium) Man-Kei To	12–21, 21–19, 10–21	(silver) Runner-up
2021	Dubai Para Badminton International	(Switzerland) Karin Suter-Erath	(Russia) Liliia Prokofeva (Russia) Nataliia Prokofeva	21–10, 21–6	(silver) Runner-up
2021	Dubai Para Badminton International	(Switzerland) Karin Suter-Erath	(Austria) Henriett Koósz (Switzerland) Ilaria Renggli	21–19, 21–18	(silver) Runner-up

Mixed doubles
Year	Tournament	Partner	Opponent	Score	Result
2018	Dubai Para Badminton International	(India) Abu Hubaida	(Spain) Roberto Galdós (Turkey) Emine Seçkin	8–21, 22–20, 14–21	(silver) Runner-up
2019	Thailand Para Badminton International	(India) Abu Hubaida	(Israel) Amir Levi (Israel) Nina Gorodetzky	21–18, 13–21, 14–21	(silver) Runner-up
2019	Denmark Para Badminton International	(Switzerland) Luca Olgiati	(Brazil) Marcelo Alves (Belgium) To Man-kei	21–12, 18–21, 21–12	(gold) Winner
2020	Peru Para Badminton International	(India) Abu Hubaida	(India) Prem Kumar Ale (Russia) Tatiana Gureeva	9–21, 12–21	(silver) Runner-up
