= Badminton at the 2024 Summer Paralympics – Women's singles WH2 =

Badminton competition

Women's singles WH2 at the XVII Paralympic Games
- Venue: Arena Porte de La Chapelle, Paris
- Dates: 30 August 2024 – 2 September 2024
- Competitors: 10 from 9 nations

Medalists
1st place, gold medalist(s)		Liu Yutong	China
2nd place, silver medalist(s)		Li Hongyan	China
3rd place, bronze medalist(s)		Ilaria Renggli	Switzerland

The women's singles WH2 tournament at the 2024 Summer Paralympics in France will take place between 30 August and 2 September 2024 at Arena Porte de La Chapelle.

== Classification ==
- WH2
  Players have impairment in one or both lower limbs and minimal or no impairment of the trunk and also require wheelchair

== Seeds ==
These were the seeds for this event:

1. Emine Seçkin (TUR) (group stage)
2. Pilar Jáuregui (PER) (group stage)
3. Jung Gye-oul (KOR) (quarterfinals)

== Group stage ==
The draw of the group stage revealed on 24 August 2024. The group stage will be played from 30 to 31 August. The top two winners of each group advanced to the knockout rounds.

=== Group A ===
Pos	Team	Pld	W	L	GF	GA	GD	PF	PA	PD	Pts	Qualification
1	Liu Yutong (CHN)	2	2	0	4	0	+4	84	21	+63	2	Semi-finals
2	Yuma Yamazaki (JPN)	2	1	1	2	2	0	50	71	−21	1	Quarter-finals
3	Emine Seçkin (TUR)	2	0	2	0	4	−4	42	84	−42	0	

First match(es) will be played: 30 August 2024. Source: COJOP2024

Date	Time	Player 1	Score	Player 2	Set 1	Set 2	Set 3	Report
Aug 30	8:32	Liu Yutong (China)	2–0	(Japan) Yuma Yamazaki	21–5	21–3		Report
Aug 30	17:13	Emine Seçkin (Turkey)	0–2	(Japan) Yuma Yamazaki	15–21	14–21		Report
Aug 31	12:26	Emine Seçkin (Turkey)	0–2	(China) Liu Yutong	5–21	8–21		Report

=== Group B ===
Pos	Team	Pld	W	L	GF	GA	GD	PF	PA	PD	Pts	Qualification
1	Amnouy Wetwithan (THA)	1	1	0	2	1	+1	62	41	+21	1	Quarter-finals
2	Jung Gye-oul (KOR)	1	0	1	1	2	−1	41	62	−21	0	Quarter-finals
3	Mischa Ginns (AUS)	0	0	0	0	0	0	0	0	0	0	Withdrew

First match(es) will be played: 30 August 2024. Source: COJOP2024

Date	Time	Player 1	Score	Player 2	Set 1	Set 2	Set 3	Report
Aug 30	9:10	Amnouy Wetwithan (Thailand)	0–0	(Australia) Mischa Ginns	No match			
Aug 30	16:00	Jung Gye-oul (South Korea)	0–0	(Australia) Mischa Ginns	No match			
Aug 31	11:26	Jung Gye-oul (South Korea)	1–2	(Thailand) Amnouy Wetwithan	10–21	22–20	9–21	Report

=== Group C ===
Pos	Team	Pld	W	L	GF	GA	GD	PF	PA	PD	Pts	Qualification
1	Li Hongyan (CHN)	3	3	0	6	1	+5	143	82	+61	3	Semi-finals
2	Ilaria Renggli (SUI)	3	2	1	4	3	+1	138	127	+11	2	Quarter-finals
3	Pilar Jáuregui (PER)	3	1	2	4	4	0	146	142	+4	1	
4	Yang I-chen (TPE)	3	0	3	0	6	−6	50	126	−76	0	

First match(es) will be played: 30 August 2024. Source: COJOP2024

Date	Time	Player 1	Score	Player 2	Set 1	Set 2	Set 3	Report
Aug 30	8:33	Yang I-chen (Chinese Taipei)	0–2	(Switzerland) Ilaria Renggli	9–21	18–21		Report
Aug 30	9:02	Pilar Jáuregui (Peru)	1–2	(China) Li Hongyan	10–21	21–17	15–21	Report
Aug 30	17:09	Pilar Jáuregui (Peru)	1–2	(Switzerland) Ilaria Renggli	24–26	21–19	13–21	Report
Aug 30	18:24	Yang I-chen (Chinese Taipei)	0–2	(China) Li Hongyan	4–21	2–21		Report
Aug 31	12:16	Pilar Jáuregui (Peru)	2–0	(Chinese Taipei) Yang I-chen	21–10	21–7		Report
Aug 31	12:59	Ilaria Renggli (Switzerland)	0–2	(China) Li Hongyan	17–21	13–21		Report

== Finals ==
The knockout stage will be played from 1 to 2 September.

Quarter-finals
Amnouy Wetwithan (THA)	14	16	-
Yuma Yamazaki (JPN)	21	21	-
Jung Gye-oul (KOR)	17	19	-
Ilaria Renggli (SUI)	21	21	-

Semi-finals
Liu Yutong (CHN)	21	21	-
Yuma Yamazaki (JPN)	6	9	-
Ilaria Renggli (SUI)	17	12	-
Li Hongyan (CHN)	21	21	-

Gold medal match
Liu Yutong (CHN) (gold)	21	21	-
Li Hongyan (CHN) (silver)	15	13	-
Bronze medal match
Yuma Yamazaki (JPN)	13	14	-
Ilaria Renggli (SUI) (bronze)	21	21	-
