= Badminton at the 2023 European Para Championships – Women's singles WH2 =

Badminton's women's singles WH2 at the 2023 European Para Championships
- Venue: Rotterdam Ahoy, Rotterdam
- Dates: 15 – 20 August
- Competitors: 6 from 5 nations

Medalists
gold medal	Emine Seçkin	Turkey
silver medal	Ilaria Renggli	Switzerland
bronze medal	Annika Schröder	Germany
bronze medal	Narin Uluç	Turkey

The women's singles WH2 badminton tournament at the 2023 European Para Championships was played from 15 to 20 August 2023 in Rotterdam Ahoy, Rotterdam. A total of 6 players competed at the tournament, two of whom was seeded.

== Competition schedule ==
Play took place between 15 and 20 August.

GS	Group stage	½	Semifinals	F	Final

Events	Tue 15	Wed 16	Thu 17	Fri 18	Sat 19	Sun 20
Women's singles WH2	GS	GS	GS		½	F

== Seeds ==
The following players were seeded:

1. Ilaria Renggli (SUI) (final; silver medalist)
2. Emine Seçkin (TUR) (champion; gold medalist)

== Group stage ==
=== Group A ===
Pos	Team	Pld	W	L	GF	GA	GD	PF	PA	PD	Qualification
1	Ilaria Renggli (SUI) [1]	2	2	0	4	0	+4	84	38	+46	Qualification to elimination stage
2	Narin Uluç (TUR)	2	1	1	2	2	0	65	62	+3	Qualification to elimination stage
3	Marilou Maurel (FRA)	2	0	2	0	4	−4	35	84	−49	

Source: Group A – standings

Date		Score		Game 1	Game 2	Game 3
15 August	Ilaria Renggli (Switzerland)	2–0	(France) Marilou Maurel	21–6	21–9	
16 August	Ilaria Renggli (Switzerland)	2–0	(Turkey) Narin Uluç	21–8	21–15	
17 August	Marilou Maurel (France)	0–2	(Turkey) Narin Uluç	11–21	9–21	

=== Group B ===
Pos	Team	Pld	W	L	GF	GA	GD	PF	PA	PD	Qualification
1	Emine Seçkin (TUR) [2]	2	2	0	4	0	+4	84	18	+66	Qualification to elimination stage
2	Annika Schröder (GER)	2	1	1	2	2	0	54	57	−3	Qualification to elimination stage
3	Sharon Jones-Barnes (GBR)	2	0	2	0	4	−4	21	84	−63	

Source: Group B – standings

Date		Score		Game 1	Game 2	Game 3
15 August	Emine Seçkin (Turkey)	2–0	(Germany) Annika Schröder	21–5	21–7	
16 August	Emine Seçkin (Turkey)	2–0	(United Kingdom) Sharon Jones-Barnes	21–4	21–2	
17 August	Annika Schröder (Germany)	2–0	(United Kingdom) Sharon Jones-Barnes	21–7	21–8	

== Elimination stage ==
Semi-finals
1	Ilaria Renggli (SUI)	21	21
Annika Schröder (GER)	8	4
Narin Uluç (TUR)	7	7
2	Emine Seçkin (TUR)	21	21

Final
1	Ilaria Renggli (SUI)	12	17
2	Emine Seçkin (TUR)	21	21
