= Ilaria Renggli =

Swiss para-badminton player (born 2000)

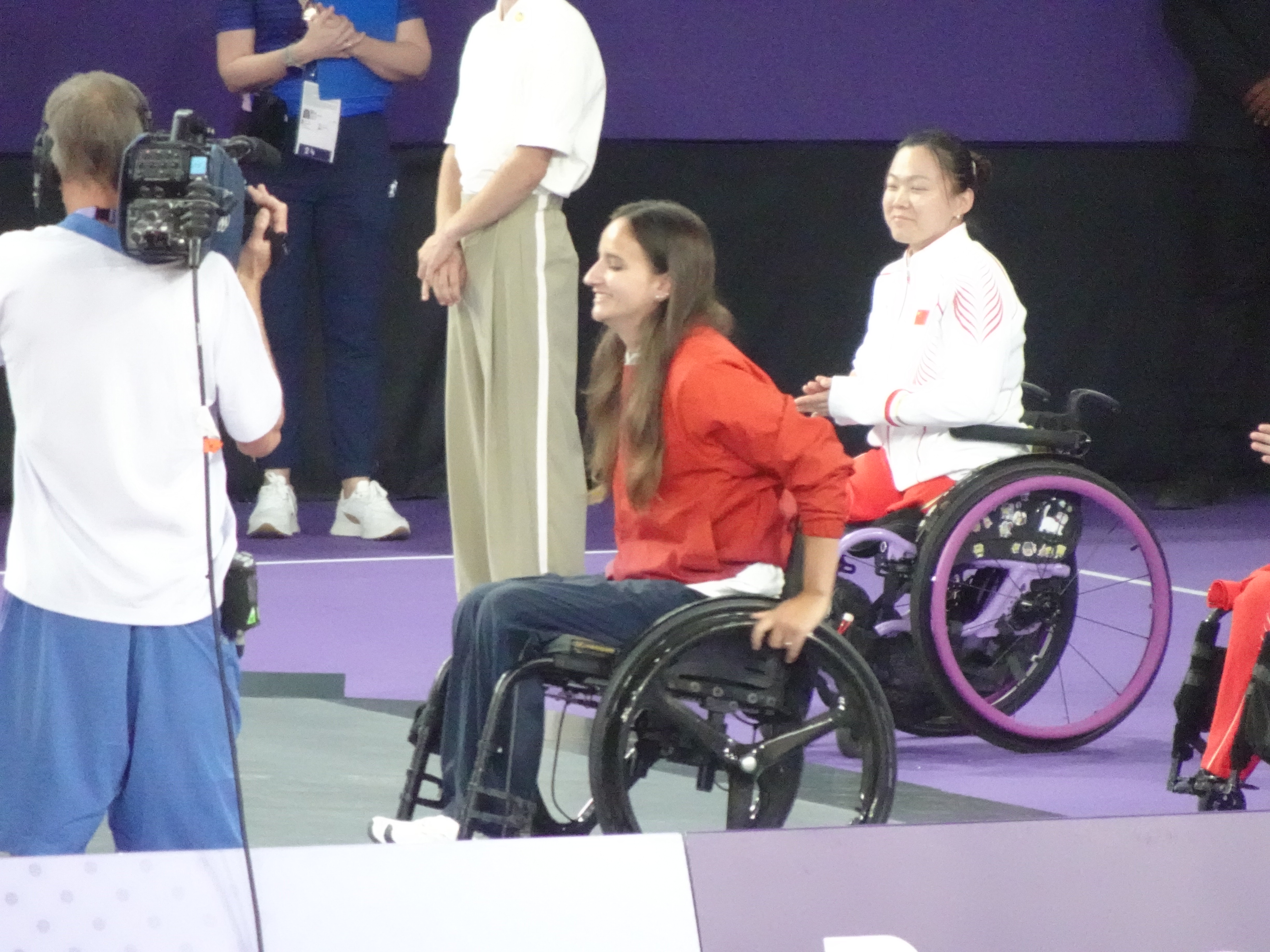

Personal information
- Born: 6 February 2000 (age 26) Wien, Austria
- Height: 1.71 m (5 ft 7 in)

Sport
- Country: Switzerland
- Sport: Badminton
- Handedness: Right
- Coached by: Karin Suter-Erath

Women's singles WH2 Women's doubles WH1–WH2 Mixed doubles WH1–WH2
- Highest ranking: 1 (WS 23 August 2022); 2 (WD with Cynthia Mathez 18 June 2023); 16 (XD with David Follett 29 November 2022)
- Current ranking: 2 (WS); 3 (WD with Cynthia Mathez); 25 (XD with Park Hae-seong) (3 September 2024)
- BWF profile
Medal record
Para badminton
Representing Switzerland
Paralympic Games
Bronze medal – third place	2024 Paris	Women's singles
World Championships
Bronze medal – third place	2022 Tokyo	Women's singles
Bronze medal – third place	2022 Tokyo	Women's doubles
European Para Championships
Gold medal – first place	2023 Rotterdam	Women's doubles
Silver medal – second place	2023 Rotterdam	Women's singles

Ilaria Renggli (born 6 February 2000) is a Swiss para-badminton player who competes in international badminton competitions. She is a double World bronze medalist and a European champion in the doubles with Cynthia Mathez. Renggli was a former artistic gymnast until she had a haemorrhage in her back which caused her to become paraplegic.

== Achievements ==
=== Paralympic Games ===
Women's singles WH2

Year	Venue	Opponent	Score	Result
2024	Porte de La Chapelle Arena, Paris, France	(Japan) Yuma Yamazaki	21–13, 21–14	Bronze

=== World Championships ===
Women's singles WH2
Year	Venue	Opponent	Score	Result
2022	Yoyogi National Gymnasium; Tokyo, Japan	(Turkey) Emine Seçkin	11–21, 9–21	Bronze

Women's doubles WH1–WH2
Year	Venue	Partner	Opponent	Score	Result
2022	Yoyogi National Gymnasium; Tokyo, Japan	(Switzerland) Cynthia Mathez	(Turkey) Emine Seçkin (Belgium) To Man-kei	13–21, 12–21	Bronze

=== European Para Championships ===
Women's singles WH2
Year	Venue	Opponent	Score	Result
2023	Rotterdam Ahoy, Rotterdam, Netherlands	(Turkey) Emine Seçkin	12–21, 17–21	Silver

Women's doubles WH1–WH2
Year	Venue	Partner	Opponent	Score	Result
2023	Rotterdam Ahoy, Rotterdam, Netherlands	(Switzerland) Cynthia Mathez	Nina Gorodetzky (Belgium) To Man-kei	11–21, 21–13, 21–11	Gold

=== BWF Para Badminton World Circuit (6 titles, 11 runners-up) ===
The BWF Para Badminton World Circuit – Grade 2, Level 1, 2 and 3 tournaments has been sanctioned by the Badminton World Federation from 2022.

Women's singles WH2

Year	Tournament	Level	Opponent	Score	Result
2022	Spanish Para Badminton International II	Level 2	(Peru) Pilar Jáuregui	Walkover	(gold) Winner
2022	Spanish Para Badminton International I	Level 1	(Belgium) To Man-kei	21–18, 21–18	(gold) Winner
2022	4 Nations Para Badminton International	Level 1	(Germany) Annika Schroeder	21–8, 21–7	(silver) Runner-up
2022	4 Nations Para Badminton International	Level 1	(France) Marilou Maurel	21–6, 21–6	(silver) Runner-up
2022	4 Nations Para Badminton International	Level 1	(Japan) Yuma Yamazaki	8–21, 11–21	(silver) Runner-up
2023	Brazil Para Badminton International	Level 2	(Peru) Pilar Jáuregui	19–21, 13–21	(silver) Runner-up
2023	Canada Para Badminton International	Level 1	(Turkey) Emine Seçkin	10–21, 21–17, 12–21	(silver) Runner-up
2023	Western Australia Para Badminton International	Level 2	(Peru) Pilar Jáuregui	22–20, 27–29, 8–21	(silver) Runner-up
2024	Bahrain Para Badminton International	Level 2	(Switzerland) Cynthia Mathez	21–9, 21–14	(gold) Winner

Women's doubles WH1–WH2

Year	Tournament	Level	Partner	Opponent	Score	Result
2022	Dubai Para Badminton International	Level 2	(Switzerland) Cynthia Mathez	(South Korea) Jung Gye-oul (South Korea) Kwon Hyun-ah	14–21, 14–21	(silver) Runner-up
2023	Spanish Para Badminton International II	Level 2	(Switzerland) Cynthia Mathez	(Japan) Sarina Satomi (Japan) Yuma Yamazaki	12–21, 13–21	(silver) Runner-up
2023	Brazil Para Badminton International	Level 2	(Switzerland) Cynthia Mathez	(South Korea) Jung Gye-oul (South Korea) Kwon Hyun-ah	18–21, 19–21	(silver) Runner-up
2023	Canada Para Badminton International	Level 1	(Switzerland) Cynthia Mathez	(Thailand) Sujirat Pookkham (Thailand) Amnouy Wetwithan	17–21, 7–21	(silver) Runner-up
2023	Western Australia Para Badminton International	Level 2	(South Korea) Kim Seung-suk	(Australia) Catherine Gallagher (Australia) Macka Mackenzie	Walkover	(gold) Winner
2023	Western Australia Para Badminton International	Level 2	(South Korea) Kim Seung-suk	(Peru) Jaquelin Burgos (Peru) Pilar Jáuregui	21–16, 17–21, 21–12	(gold) Winner
2023	Western Australia Para Badminton International	Level 2	(South Korea) Kim Seung-suk	(India) Alphia James (Australia) Fiona Sing	21–5, 21–7	(gold) Winner
2023	Western Australia Para Badminton International	Level 2	(South Korea) Kim Seung-suk	(Chinese Taipei) Hu Guang-chou (Chinese Taipei) Yang I-chen	21–14, 21–9	(gold) Winner
2024	4 Nations Para Badminton International	Level 1	(Switzerland) Cynthia Mathez	(Brazil) Ana Gomes (Brazil) Daniele Souza	21–5, 21–2	(gold) Winner
2024	4 Nations Para Badminton International	Level 1	(Switzerland) Cynthia Mathez	(Chinese Taipei) Hu Guang-chou (Chinese Taipei) Yang I-chen	21–6, 21–13	(gold) Winner
2024	4 Nations Para Badminton International	Level 1	(Switzerland) Cynthia Mathez	(Canada) Yuka Chokyu (Australia) Mischa Ginns	21–8, 21–5	(gold) Winner

Mixed doubles WH1–WH2

Year	Tournament	Level	Partner	Opponent	Score	Result
2022	Spanish Para Badminton International	Level 2	(England) David Follett	(Italy) Yuri Ferrigno (Peru) Pilar Jáuregui	Walkover	(gold) Winner
2022	Dubai Para Badminton International	Level 2	Konstantin Afinogenov	(Hong Kong) Chan Ho Yuen (Belgium) To Man-kei	21–19, 19–21, 20–22	(silver) Runner-up
2024	Spanish Para Badminton International II	Level 2	(South Korea) Park Hae-seong	(Hong Kong) Chan Ho Yuen (Belgium) To Man-kei	21–17, 17–21, 18–21	(silver) Runner-up
2024	Bahrain Para Badminton International	Level 2	(Italy) Yuri Ferrigno	(Iraq) Mohammed Jawad Khadim (India) Alphia James	21–10, 21–10	(silver) Runner-up
2024	Bahrain Para Badminton International	Level 2	(Italy) Yuri Ferrigno	(Czech Republic) Zbyněk Sýkora (Bahrain) Fatema Asad	21–4, 21–5	(silver) Runner-up
2024	Bahrain Para Badminton International	Level 2	(Italy) Yuri Ferrigno	(Czech Republic) Kamil Šnajdar (Germany) Annika Schroeder	21–7, 21–4	(silver) Runner-up
2024	Bahrain Para Badminton International	Level 2	(Italy) Yuri Ferrigno	(Hong Kong) Chan Ho Yuen (Belgium) To Man-kei	15–21, 19–21	(silver) Runner-up
