= Badminton at the 2023 European Para Championships – Women's singles SL3 =

Badminton's women's singles SL3 at the 2023 European Para Championships
- Venue: Rotterdam Ahoy, Rotterdam
- Dates: 15 – 20 August
- Competitors: 6 from 5 nations

Medalists
gold medal	Halime Yıldız	Turkey
silver medal	Oksana Kozyna	Ukraine
bronze medal	Coraline Bergeron	France
bronze medal	Emona Ivanova	Bulgaria

The women's singles WH1 badminton tournament at the 2023 European Para Championships was played from 15 to 20 August 2023 in Rotterdam Ahoy, Rotterdam. A total of 6 players competed at the tournament, two of whom was seeded.

== Competition schedule ==
Play took place between 15 and 20 August.

GS	Group stage	½	Semifinals	F	Final

Events	Tue 15	Wed 16	Thu 17	Fri 18	Sat 19	Sun 20
Women's singles SL3	GS	GS	GS		½	F

== Seeds ==
The following players were seeded:

1. Oksana Kozyna (UKR) (final; silver medalist)
2. Halime Yıldız (TUR) (champion; gold medalist)

== Group stage ==
=== Group A ===
Pos	Team	Pld	W	L	GF	GA	GD	PF	PA	PD	Qualification
1	Oksana Kozyna (UKR) [1]	2	2	0	4	0	+4	84	17	+67	Qualification to elimination stage
2	Emona Ivanova (BUL)	2	1	1	2	2	0	56	48	+8	Qualification to elimination stage
3	Catherine Naudin (FRA)	2	0	2	0	4	−4	9	84	−75	

Source: Group A – standings

Date		Score		Game 1	Game 2	Game 3
15 August	Oksana Kozyna (Ukraine)	2–0	(France) Catherine Naudin	21–3	21–0	
16 August	Oksana Kozyna (Ukraine)	2–0	(Bulgaria) Emona Ivanova	21–7	21–7	
17 August	Catherine Naudin (France)	0–2	(Bulgaria) Emona Ivanova	2–21	4–21	

=== Group B ===
Pos	Team	Pld	W	L	GF	GA	GD	PF	PA	PD	Qualification
1	Halime Yıldız (TUR) [2]	2	2	0	4	0	+4	84	25	+59	Qualification to elimination stage
2	Coraline Bergeron (FRA)	2	1	1	2	2	0	61	53	+8	Qualification to elimination stage
3	Cambell Plant (GBR)	2	0	2	0	4	−4	17	84	−67	

Source: Group B – standings

Date		Score		Game 1	Game 2	Game 3
15 August	Halime Yıldız (Turkey)	2–0	(France) Coraline Bergeron	21–8	21–11	
16 August	Halime Yıldız (Turkey)	2–0	(United Kingdom) Cambell Plant	21–3	21–3	
17 August	Coraline Bergeron (France)	2–0	(United Kingdom) Cambell Plant	21–5	21–6	

== Elimination stage ==
Semi-finals
1	Oksana Kozyna (UKR)	21	21
Coraline Bergeron (FRA)	7	9
Emona Ivanova (BUL)	5	8
2	Halime Yıldız (TUR)	21	21

Final
1	Oksana Kozyna (UKR)	14	20
2	Halime Yıldız (TUR)	21	22
