= Badminton at the 2023 European Para Championships – Women's singles WH1 =

Badminton's women's singles WH1 at the 2023 European Para Championships
- Venue: Rotterdam Ahoy, Rotterdam
- Dates: 15 – 20 August
- Competitors: 9 from 8 nations

Medalists
| gold medal | Man-Kei To | Belgium |
| silver medal | Cynthia Mathez | Switzerland |
| bronze medal | Nina Gorodetzky | Israel |
| bronze medal | Henriett Koósz | Austria |

The women's singles WH1 badminton tournament at the 2023 European Para Championships was played from 15 to 20 August 2023 in Rotterdam Ahoy, Rotterdam. A total of 9 players competed at the tournament, three of whom was seeded.

== Competition schedule ==
Play took place between 15 and 20 August.

| GS | Group stage | ¼ | Quarterfinals | ½ | Semifinals | F | Final |

| Events | Tue 15 | Wed 16 | Thu 17 | Fri 18 | Sat 19 | Sun 20 |
|---|---|---|---|---|---|---|
| Women's singles WH1 | GS | GS | GS | ¼ | ½ | F |

== Seeds ==
The following players were seeded:

1. Cynthia Mathez (SUI) (final; silver medalist)
2. Man-Kei To (BEL) (champion; gold medalist)
3. Henriett Koósz (AUT) (semi-finals; bronze medalist)

== Group stage ==
=== Group A ===
| Pos | Team | Pld | W | L | GF | GA | GD | PF | PA | PD | Qualification |
|---|---|---|---|---|---|---|---|---|---|---|---|
| 1 | Cynthia Mathez (SUI) [1] | 2 | 2 | 0 | 4 | 0 | +4 | 84 | 28 | +56 | Qualification to elimination stage |
| 2 | Natalia Grzyb (POL) | 2 | 1 | 1 | 2 | 3 | −1 | 67 | 90 | −23 | Qualification to elimination stage |
| 3 | Heidi Manninen (FIN) | 2 | 0 | 2 | 1 | 4 | −3 | 64 | 97 | −33 | |

Source: Group A – standings

| Date | | Score | | Game 1 | Game 2 | Game 3 |
|---|---|---|---|---|---|---|
| 15 August | Cynthia Mathez (Switzerland) | 2–0 | (Finland) Heidi Manninen | 21–8 | 21–8 | |
| 16 August | Cynthia Mathez (Switzerland) | 2–0 | (Poland) Natalia Grzyb | 21–7 | 21–5 | |
| 17 August | Heidi Manninen (Finland) | 1–2 | (Poland) Natalia Grzyb | 21–13 | 14–21 | 13–21 |

=== Group B ===
| Pos | Team | Pld | W | L | GF | GA | GD | PF | PA | PD | Qualification |
|---|---|---|---|---|---|---|---|---|---|---|---|
| 1 | Man-Kei To (BEL) [2] | 2 | 2 | 0 | 4 | 0 | +4 | 84 | 22 | +62 | Qualification to elimination stage |
| 2 | Anna Wolny (POL) | 2 | 1 | 1 | 2 | 2 | 0 | 52 | 68 | −16 | Qualification to elimination stage |
| 3 | Ebru Gökşen (TUR) | 2 | 0 | 2 | 0 | 4 | −4 | 38 | 84 | −46 | |

Source: Group B – standings

| Date | | Score | | Game 1 | Game 2 | Game 3 |
|---|---|---|---|---|---|---|
| 15 August | Man-Kei To (Belgium) | 2–0 | (Poland) Anna Wolny | 21–6 | 21–4 | |
| 16 August | Man-Kei To (Belgium) | 2–0 | (Turkey) Ebru Gökşen | 21–6 | 21–6 | |
| 17 August | Anna Wolny (Poland) | 2–0 | (Turkey) Ebru Gökşen | 21–19 | 21–7 | |

=== Group C ===
| Pos | Team | Pld | W | L | GF | GA | GD | PF | PA | PD | Qualification |
|---|---|---|---|---|---|---|---|---|---|---|---|
| 1 | Henriett Koósz (AUT) [3] | 2 | 2 | 0 | 4 | 1 | +3 | 102 | 60 | +42 | Qualification to elimination stage |
| 2 | Nina Gorodetzky (ISR) | 2 | 1 | 1 | 3 | 2 | +1 | 93 | 70 | +23 | Qualification to elimination stage |
| 3 | Agnieszka Glemp-Etavard (FRA) | 2 | 0 | 2 | 0 | 4 | −4 | 19 | 84 | −65 | |

Source: Group C – standings

| Date | | Score | | Game 1 | Game 2 | Game 3 |
|---|---|---|---|---|---|---|
| 15 August | Henriett Koósz (Austria) | 2–0 | (France) Agnieszka Glemp-Etavard | 21–4 | 21–5 | |
| 16 August | Henriett Koósz (Austria) | 2–1 | (Israel) Nina Gorodetzky | 18–21 | 21–18 | 21–12 |
| 17 August | Agnieszka Glemp-Etavard (France) | 0–2 | (Israel) Nina Gorodetzky | 2–21 | 8–21 | |

== Elimination stage ==
Quarter-finals
Anna Wolny (POL) | 6 | 2
Nina Gorodetzky (ISR) | 21 | 21
Natalia Grzyb (POL) | 13 | 16
3 | Henriett Koósz (AUT) | 21 | 21

Semi-finals
1 | Cynthia Mathez (SUI) | 21 | 21
Nina Gorodetzky (ISR) | 6 | 2
3 | Henriett Koósz (AUT) | 13 | 16
2 | Man-Kei To (BEL) | 21 | 21

Final
1 | Cynthia Mathez (SUI) | 9 | 12
2 | Man-Kei To (BEL) | 21 | 21
