= Thulasimathi Murugesan =

Indian para-badminton player

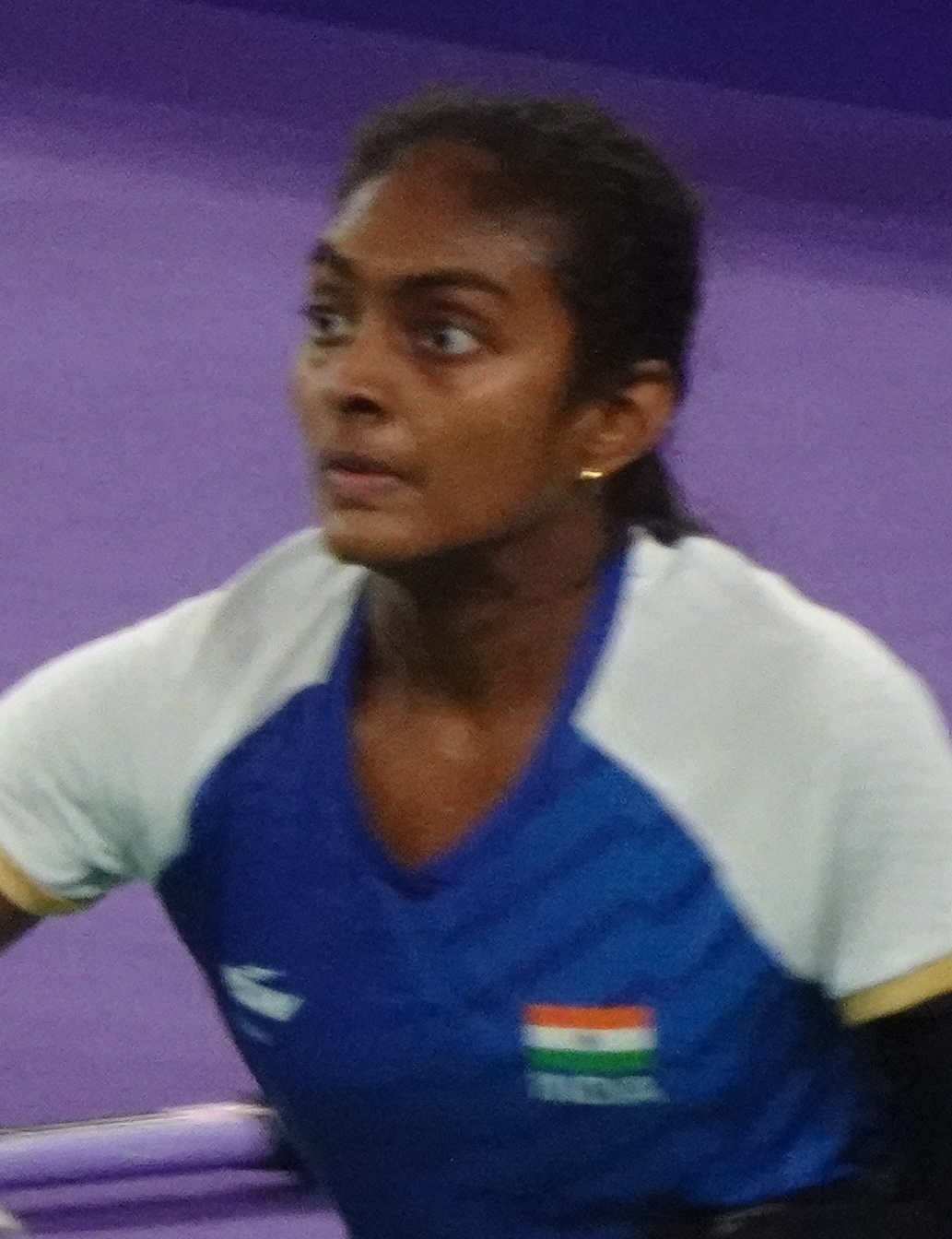
- Thulasimathi at the 2024 Summer Paralympics

Personal information
- Born: 11 April 2002 (age 24) Kancheepuram, India

Sport
- Country: India
- Sport: Badminton
Medal record
Women's para-badminton
Representing India
Paralympic Games
Silver medal – second place	2024 Paris	Women's singles
World Championships
Silver medal – second place	2024 Pattaya	Women's doubles
Bronze medal – third place	2026 Manama	Women's singles
Bronze medal – third place	2026 Manama	Women's doubles
Asian Para Games
Gold medal – first place	2022 Hangzhou	Singles SU5
Silver medal – second place	2022 Hangzhou	Doubles SL3-SU5
Bronze medal – third place	2022 Hangzhou	Mixed doubles SL3-SU5

Thulasimathi Murugesan (born 11 April 2002) is a badminton paralympian from Tamil Nadu. She represented India at the 2022 Asian Para Games held at Gangzhou, China. She won three medals in para badminton competitions, SL3-SU5 and SU5 classes. She made history as the first Indian woman shuttler to win a Paralympic silver medal, following a remarkable journey to the final in the SU5 category.

== Early life and education ==
Thulasimathi is from Kancheepuram. She had a deformity in her left hand from birth which restricted her movements and flexion to below 30 per cent. Her father Murugesan was a sports addict and made both their daughters play together and did not reveal about her condition to Thulasimathi. She was supported by her sister, Kiruttigha.

She was later spotted by coach Irfan, who was instrumental in getting her to Gopichand Academy at Hyderabad with the support of Olympic Gold Quest. She is a student of veterinary science at a college in Namakkal, affiliated with Tamil Nadu Veterinary and Animal Sciences University, Chennai.

== Career ==
In December 2023, Thulasimathi won the gold medal in the women's doubles partnering Manasi Joshi at the 5th Fazza Dubai Para Badminton International 2023. She later won another bronze in the mixed doubles SL3 and SU5, along with Nitesh Kumar. Along with Manasi, she is second in the World Para-Badminton doubles rankings. She trains under coaches Gopichand and Irfan at Hyderabad. She is supported by Olympic Gold Quest.

In the 4th Asian Para Games at Hangzhou, she won three medals: gold in singles, silver in doubles with Joshi and bronze in mixed doubles with Kumar Nitesh. She won a bronze medal on 25 October 2023 in the mixed doubles SL3-SU5 class pairing with Nitesh Kumar. She went on to win a silver medal partnering Manasi Joshi in the women's doubles SL3-SU5 on 27 October and topped it with a gold in the individual women's singles SU5 class.

== Awards ==
Thulasimathi won the Sportstar Aces Awards 2024 Sportswoman of the Year award for her exploits in 2023.

== Achievements ==
=== Paralympic Games ===
Women's singles SU5

Year	Venue	Opponent	Score	Result
2024	La Chapelle Arena Court 1, Paris, France	(China) Yang Qiuxia	17–21, 10–21	Silver

=== World Championships ===
Women’s doubles

Year	Venue	Partner	Opponent	Score	Result
2024	Pattaya Exhibition and Convention Hall, Pattaya, Thailand	(India) Manasi Joshi	(Indonesia) Leani Ratri Oktila (Indonesia) Khalimatus Sadiyah	20–22, 17–21	Silver
