= Halime Yıldız =

Turkish para-badminton player (born 1980)

Personal information
- Born: 10 September 1980 (age 45) Aksaray, Turkey

Sport
- Country: Turkey
- Sport: Badminton
Medal record
Women's Para-badminton
Representing Turkey
World Championships
Bronze medal – third place	2024 Pattaya	singles SL3
Silver medal – second place	2022 Tokyo	singles SL3
Bronze medal – third place	2019 Basel	singles SL3
European Para Championships
Gold medal – first place	2023 Rotterdam	singles SL3

Halime Yıldız (born 10 September 1980) is a Turkish European champion para-badminton player competing in the SL3 disability class. She is qualified for participation at the 2024 Paralympics in Paris, France.

== Sport career ==
Yıldız won the bronze medal in the singles SL3 category at the 2019 BWF World Championships in Basel, Switzerland.

She received the silver medal ain the singles SL3 category at the 2022 BWF Para World Championships in Tokyo, Japan.

She claimed the gold medal in the singles SL3 category at the 2023 European Para Championships in Rotterdam, Netherlands.

She won the bronze medal at the 2024 BWF Para-Badminton World Championships in Pattaya, Thailand.

Starting in 2023, she competed at eleven tournaments in various countries, returning home with medals from nine of them. She qualified to represent her country in the women's singles SL3 category at the 2024 Paralympics in Paris, France.

== Personal life ==
Halime Yıldız was born in Aksaray, Turkey on 10 September 1980. She has orthopedic disability due to congenital hip dislocation as a result of her parents' consanguine marriage. She could not attend physical education lessons in the school. She did not go to the high school. Due to financial problems, she had to work in seasonal jobs.
