= Henriett Koósz =

Austrian para badminton and former wheelchair tennis player

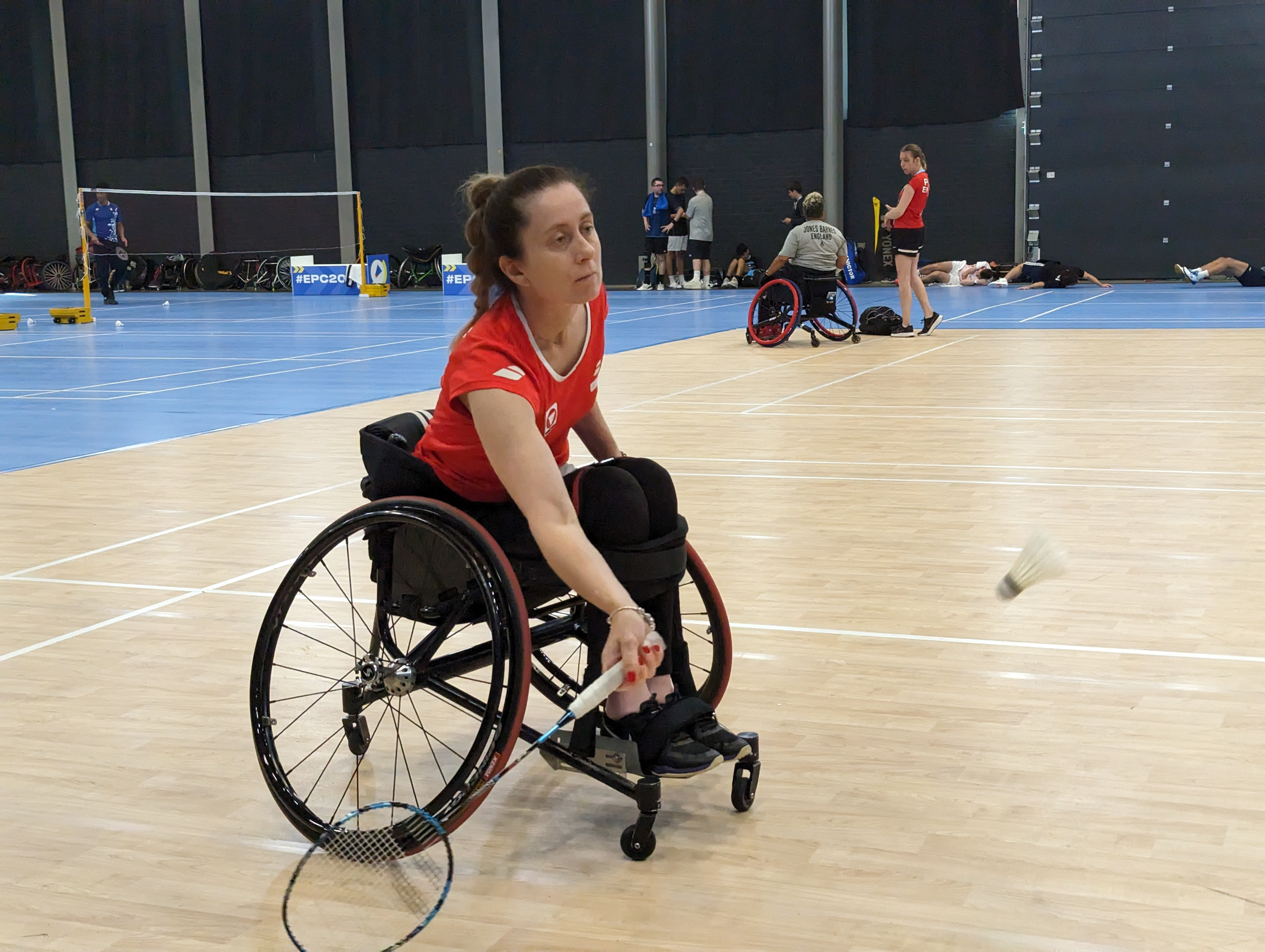
- Koósz at the European Para Championships 2023

Personal information
- Born: 14 February 1980 (age 46) Kőszeg, Hungary

Sport
- Country: Austria
- Sport: Badminton
- BWF profile
Medal record
Para badminton
Representing Austria
World Championships
Bronze medal – third place	2022 Tokyo	Women's singles
Bronze medal – third place	2022 Tokyo	Mixed doubles
European Championships
Bronze medal – third place	2016 Beek	Women's singles
Bronze medal – third place	2018 Rodez	Women's singles
European Para Championships
Silver medal – second place	2023 Rotterdam	Mixed doubles WH1–WH2
Bronze medal – third place	2023 Rotterdam	Women's singles WH1

Henriett Koósz (born 14 February 1980 in Kőszeg) is an Austrian para badminton player and former wheelchair tennis player. As a member of the Austrian Paralympic wheelchair tennis team, she competed at the 2012 Paralympics in London. In 2016, she represented Austria in para-badminton at the Austrian Open.

In 2013, she was awarded the MiA award by the Austrian Federal Sports Organisation.

== Early life and career ==
Koósz was born in Hungary. She has been paraplegic since a car accident in October 1997. She started without previous knowledge with wheelchair tennis at the age of 24. In December 2005, she started her participation in international and national tournaments.

In 2007, she played in the B squad and in 2010 was taken into the A-squad of the Austrian national wheelchair tennis team. Koósz won the 2009 national championship in women's doubles with her partner Anette Baldauf for the first time, and a year later she became national champion in women's singles.

After London, Koósz hung up her tennis racket for health reasons. In 2016, she discovered badminton and started a new career as an international parabadminton player and army athlete.

In 2024, she competed in the 2024 Paralympics in Paris.

In 2025, Henriett ended her active career as a para badminton player.

== Wheelchair tennis statistics ==
=== ITF Wheelchair Tennis Tour ===
Henriett Koósz
- Country (sports): Austria

Singles
- Career record: 91-77
- Highest ranking: No. 19 (21 June 2010)

Other tournaments
- Paralympic Games: 1R (2012)

==== Singles ====
Result	Year	Tournament	Surface	Opponent	Score
Win	2010	Birrhard Open	Clay	(Germany) Claudia Fornefeld	6–4, 6–2
Win	2010	Vulkanland Open	Clay	(Germany) Bianca Osterer	6–1, 6–2
Win	2010	Tournoi Indoors Bulle	Carpet	(Switzerland) Simona Rusnak	6–7, 6–2, 6–1
Loss	2010	Czech Open	Clay		
Loss	2010	Slovakia Open	Clay		
Loss	2010	Mediterranee Open de La Garde	Hard	(Italy) Marianna Lauro	2–6, 2–6
Win	2011	Sion Indoor	Carpet	(Colombia) Johana Martínez	6–3, 6–3
Win	2011	Tournoi de Montfermeil	-	(France) Arlette Racineux	6–1, 6–0
Loss	2011	Mediterranee Open de La Garde	Hard	(Italy) Marianna Lauro	6–2, 6^{6}–7, 5–7
Loss	2012	Slovakia Open	Clay		
Loss	2012	Czech Open	Clay	(Germany) Bianca Osterer	3–6, 6–2, 6^{5}–7
Loss	2012	Israel Open	Hard	(United Kingdom) Louise Hunt	5–7, 2–6

==== Doubles ====
Result	Year	Tournament	Surface	Partner	Opponent	Score
Win	2010	Birrhard Open	Clay	(Austria) Brigitte Seyer		
Loss	2010	Vulkanland Open	Clay	(Germany) Linda Wagemann	(Austria) Margrit Fink (Austria) Waltraud Posch	4–6, 7–6^{5}, 1–6
Win	2010	Tournoi Indoors Bulle	Carpet	(Austria) Brigitte Seyer	(Switzerland) Simona Rusnak (Germany) Linda Wagemann	6–3, 6–2
Loss	2011	Sion Indoor	Carpet	(Switzerland) Sandra Salzgeber	(Colombia) Johana Martínez (Switzerland) Karin Suter-Erath	4–6, 5–7
Win	2011	Tournoi de Montfermeil	-	(Netherlands) Mieke van Chastelet	(France) Emilie Chéné (France) Pauline Helouin	6–1, 6–4
Win	2011	Mediterranee Open de La Garde	Hard	(Italy) Marianna Lauro	(Switzerland) Parmila Grangier (Germany) Bianca Osterer	6^{5}–7, 6–2, 12–10
Win	2012	Czech Open	Clay	(Austria) Brigitte Seyer		
Loss	2012	Israel Open	Hard	(France) Emilie Chéné	(United Kingdom) Louise Hunt (Japan) Yuko Okabe	1–6, 3–6

== Para-badminton statistics ==
Henriett Koósz
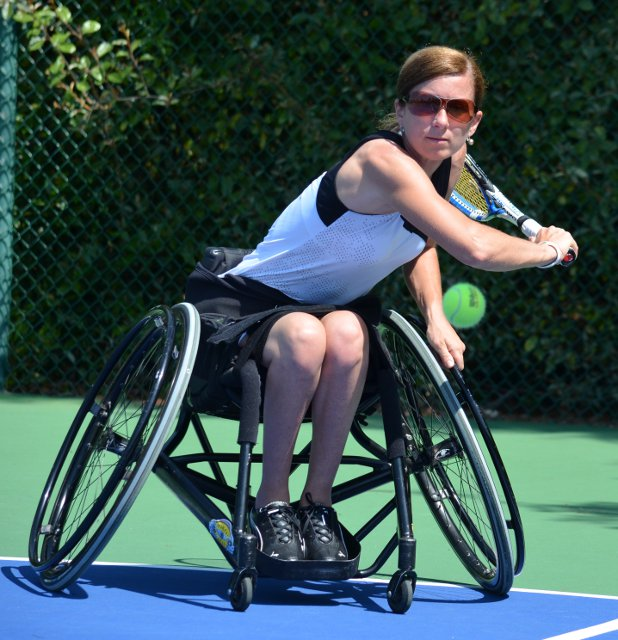

Sport
- Country: Austria
- Sport: Badminton
- Coached by: Vladimir Vangelov

Women's singles WH1 Women's doubles WH1–WH2 Mixed doubles WH1–WH2
- Highest ranking: 3 (WS 8 July 2024); 8 (WD with Marcela Quinteros 29 August 2019); 4 (XD with Ignacio Fernández 9 July 2024)
- Current ranking: 6 (WS); 4 (XD with Ignacio Fernandez) (9 July 2024)

=== World Championships ===
Women's singles
Year	Venue	Opponent	Score	Result
2022	Yoyogi National Gymnasium; Tokyo, Japan	(Switzerland) Cynthia Mathez	13–21, 8–21	Bronze

Mixed doubles
Year	Venue	Partner	Opponent	Score	Result
2022	Yoyogi National Gymnasium; Tokyo, Japan	(Spain) Ignacio Fernández	(South Korea) Choi Jung-man (South Korea) Lee Sun-ae	9–21, 12–21	Bronze

=== European Championships ===
Women's singles
Year	Venue	Opponent	Score	Result
2016	Sporthal de Haamen, Beek, Netherlands	(Switzerland) Karin Suter-Erath	10–21, 8–21	Bronze
2018	Amphitheatre Gymnasium, Rodez, France	(Germany) Valeska Knoblauch	11–21, 12–21	Bronze
