= Lénaïg Morin =

French para badminton player

Personal information
- Born: 22 June 1991 (age 35) Rennes, France
- Height: 171 cm (5 ft 7 in)
- Weight: 68 kg (150 lb)

Sport
- Country: France
- Sport: Para badminton
- Disability: Multiple sclerosis
- Club: Badminton Club Du Pays De Fougères
Medal record
Para badminton
Representing France
World Championships
Silver medal – second place	2022 Tokyo	Women's doubles SL3-SU5
European Para Championships
Silver medal – second place	2023 Rotterdam	Women's doubles SL3-SU5

Lénaïg Morin (born 22 June 1991) is a French para badminton player who competes in international badminton tournaments. She is a World and European silver medalist in the women's doubles, she has also competed at the 2020 Summer Paralympics.

Morin was diagnosed with multiple sclerosis in 2012, she also works as a veterinary assistant in Fougères.
