= Beatriz Monteiro (badminton) =

Portuguese para badminton player

Personal information
- Born: 23 December 2005 (age 20) Lisbon, Portugal

Sport
- Country: Portugal
- Sport: Badminton

Women's singles SU5 Women's doubles SL3–SU5
- Highest ranking: 5 (WS 31 March 2022); 7 (WD with Catherine Naudin 8 November 2022)
- Current ranking: 7 (WS); 7 (WD with Catherine Naudin) (8 November 2022)
- BWF profile
Medal record
Para badminton
Representing Portugal
European Championships
Bronze medal – third place	2018 Rodez	Women's singles
European Para Championships
Bronze medal – third place	2023 Rotterdam	Women's singles SU5

Beatriz Dias Monteiro (born 23 December 2005) is a Portuguese para badminton player. She competed in the Women's singles SU5 event at the 2020 Summer Paralympics. She has qualified for the 2024 Summer Paralympics.

== Achievements ==
=== European Championships ===
Women's singles

Year	Venue	Opponent	Score	Result
2018	Amphitheatre Gymnasium, Rodez, France	(Turkey) Zehra Bağlar	12–21, 6–21	Bronze

=== BWF Para Badminton World Circuit (1 runner-up) ===
The BWF Para Badminton World Circuit – Grade 2, Level 1, 2 and 3 tournaments has been sanctioned by the Badminton World Federation from 2022.

Women's singles

Year	Tournament	Level	Opponent	Score	Result
2022	Spanish Para Badminton International II	Level 2	(India) Manisha Ramdass	13–21, 10–21	(silver) Runner-up

=== International Tournaments (1 runner-up) ===
Women's singles

Year	Tournament	Opponent	Score	Result
2020	Peru Para Badminton International	(Japan) Kaede Kameyama	20–22, 13–21	(silver) Runner-up
