= Maud Lefort =

French para badminton player

Personal information
- Born: 28 May 2006 (age 20) Val d'Oise, France

Sport
- Country: France
- Sport: Para badminton
- Club: US Ézanville-Écouen, Val-d'Oise
Medal record
Para badminton
Representing France
World Championships
Bronze medal – third place	2024 Pattaya	Women's singles
Bronze medal – third place	2026 Manama	Women's singles
European Para Championships
Gold medal – first place	2023 Rotterdam	Singles SU5
Gold medal – first place	2023 Rotterdam	Doubles SL3-SU5
Bronze medal – third place	2023 Rotterdam	Mixed doubles SL3-SU5

Maud Lefort (born 28 May 2006) is a French para badminton player who competes in international badminton competitions. She is a double European Para champion in the singles and doubles events with Caroline Bergeron and won a bronze medal in the mixed doubles event with Mathieu Thomas.

At seven years old, Lefort had a life-changing accident when her elbow was dislocated following a sporting activity. This resulted in her having limited movement in her left forearm.

She won the Canada Para Badminton International in 2023 which secured her a place at the Olympics in Paris in 2024.

== Achievements ==
=== World Championships ===
Women's singles

Year	Venue	Opponent	Score	Result
2024	Pattaya Exhibition and Convention Hall, Pattaya, Thailand	(India) Manisha Ramadass	21–19, 12–21, 14–21	Bronze
