= Nina Gorodetzky =

Israeli para-badminton player (born 1981)

Nina Gorodetzky נינה גורודצקי
Personal information
- Born: 1981 (age 44–45)

Sport
- Country: Israel
- Sport: Para badminton
Medal record
Para badminton
Representing Israel
World Championships
| Silver medal – second place | 2007 Bangkok | Singles |
| Bronze medal – third place | 2011 Guatemala | Mixed doubles |
European Para-Badminton Championships
| Gold medal – first place | 2008 Dortmund | Women's singles |
| Silver medal – second place | 2010 Filzbach | Women's singles |
| Silver medal – second place | 2010 Filzbach | Mixed doubles |
| Bronze medal – third place | 2012 Dortmund | Women's singles WH1 |
| Bronze medal – third place | 2012 Dortmund | Mixed doubles WH1 |
| Bronze medal – third place | 2014 Murcia | Women's singles WH1 |
| Bronze medal – third place | 2014 Murcia | Women's doubles WH1–WH2 |
| Bronze medal – third place | 2016 Beek | Women's singles WH1 |
| Gold medal – first place | 2018 Rodez | Mixed doubles WH1–WH2 |
European Para Championships
| Bronze medal – third place | 2023 Rotterdam | Women's singles WH1 |
| Silver medal – second place | 2023 Rotterdam | Women's doubles WH1–WH2 |

Nina Gorodetzky (Hebrew: נינה גורודצקי; born 1981) is an Israeli para-badminton player, and the first badminton player to represent Israel in the Summer Paralympics. As a singles player she won the 2008 European Para-Badminton Championships, and in mixed doubles she won a gold medal in the 2018 European Para-Badminton Championships. She is competing for Israel at the 2024 Paris Paralympics.

== Early life ==
Gorodetzky was born in Georgia and emigrated aged 11 to Israel, where six years later she was severely injured in a traffic collision and became a wheelchair user.

== Para-badminton career ==
Gorodetzky competes in Para-badminton in singles and doubles. As a singles player she won the 2008 European Para-Badminton Championships and in mixed doubles she won the 2018 European Para-Badminton Championships alongside Amir Levi.
