= 2018 Asian Para Games opening and closing ceremonies =

The 2018 Asian Para Games opening ceremony was held on Saturday, 6 October 2018 at the Gelora Bung Karno Main Stadium in Jakarta, Indonesia. The closing ceremony was held exactly a week later; Saturday, 13 October 2018 at the nearby, far smaller Gelora Bung Karno Madya Stadium. Both ceremonies were started on 19:00 local time (UTC+7) and ended around 22:00.

== Opening ceremony ==
2018 Asian Para Games opening ceremony
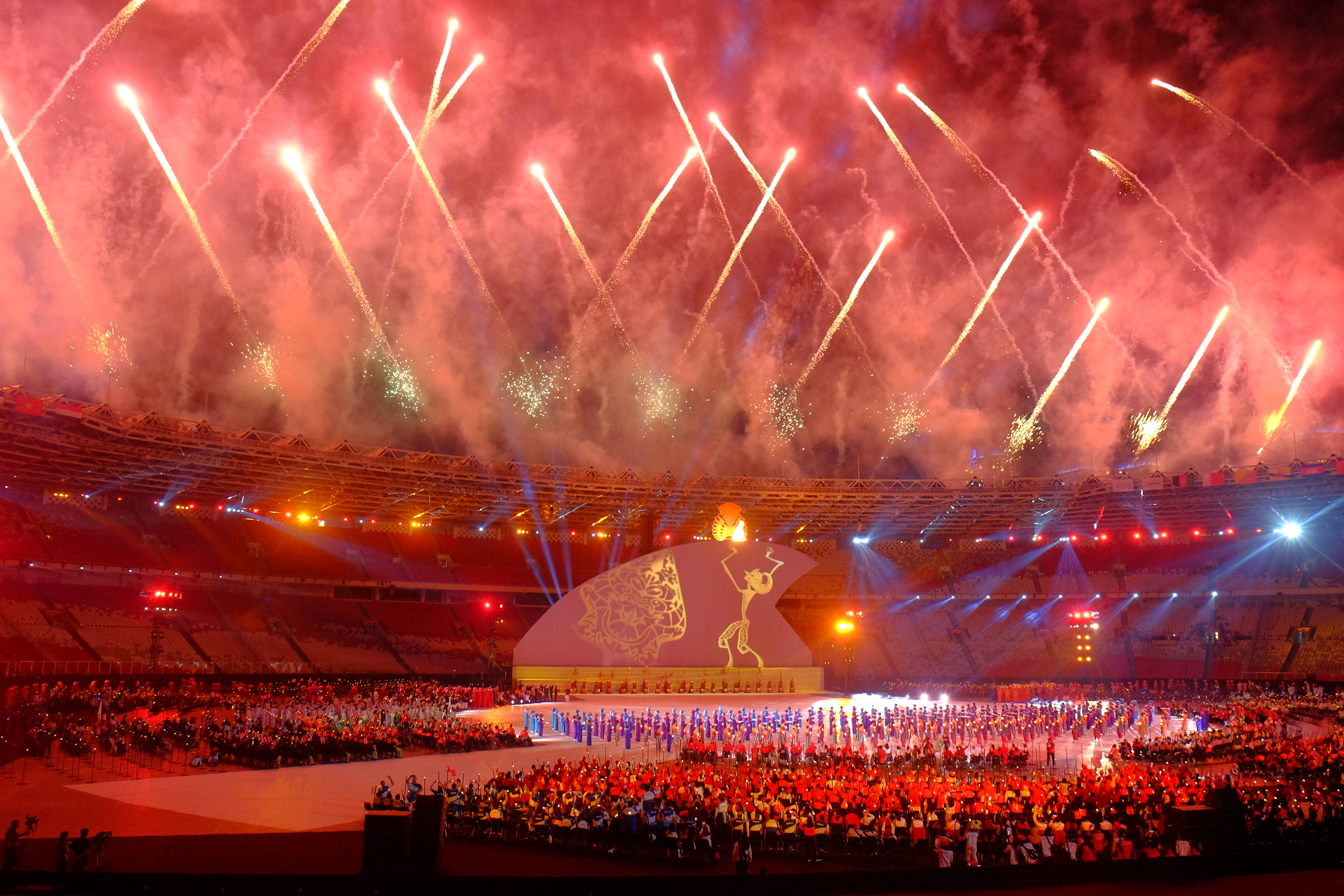
- Date: 6 October 2018; 8 years ago
- Time: 19:00 – 21:45 WIB (UTC+7)
- Location: Jakarta, Indonesia; 6°13′7″S 106°48′9″E
- Filmed by: TVRI; INAPGOC Broadcast Division
- Footage: Opening ceremony on Vidio

The opening ceremony of the 2018 Asian Para Games took place on Saturday, 6 October 2018, at the Gelora Bung Karno Main Stadium in Jakarta, Indonesia. The event commenced at 19:00 and ended at 21:45 local time. Jay Subiyakto was the Associate creative director of the ceremony. The ceremony featured a stage designed as an ocean wave and functions as a video screen.

=== Proceedings ===
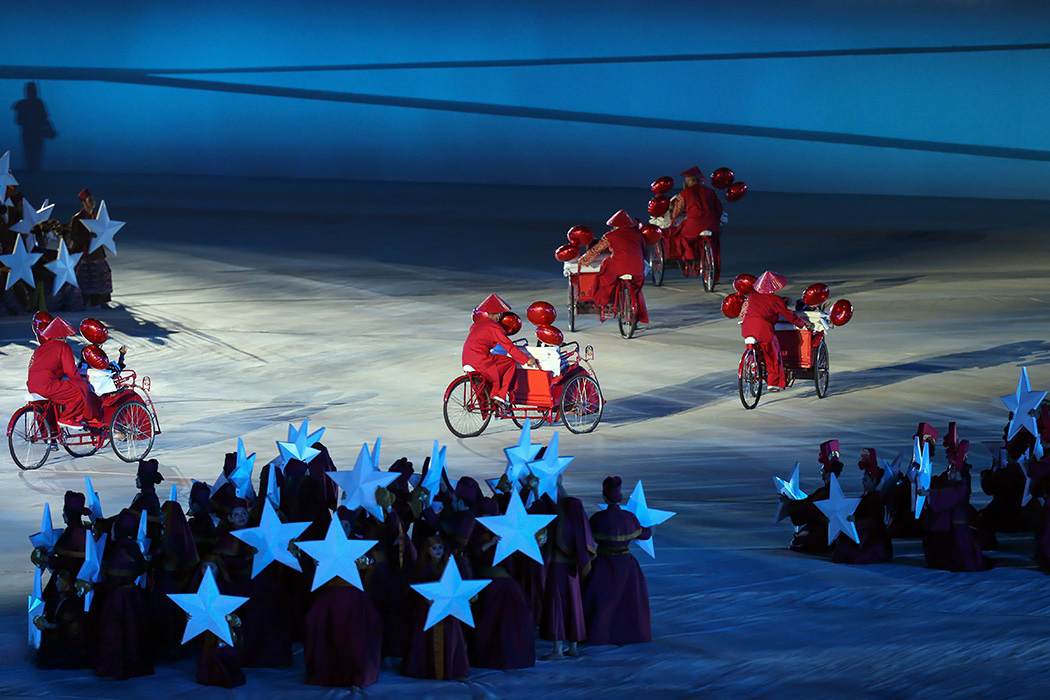
Becak attraction at the opening ceremony of 2018 Asian Para Games in Gelora Bung Karno Stadium.

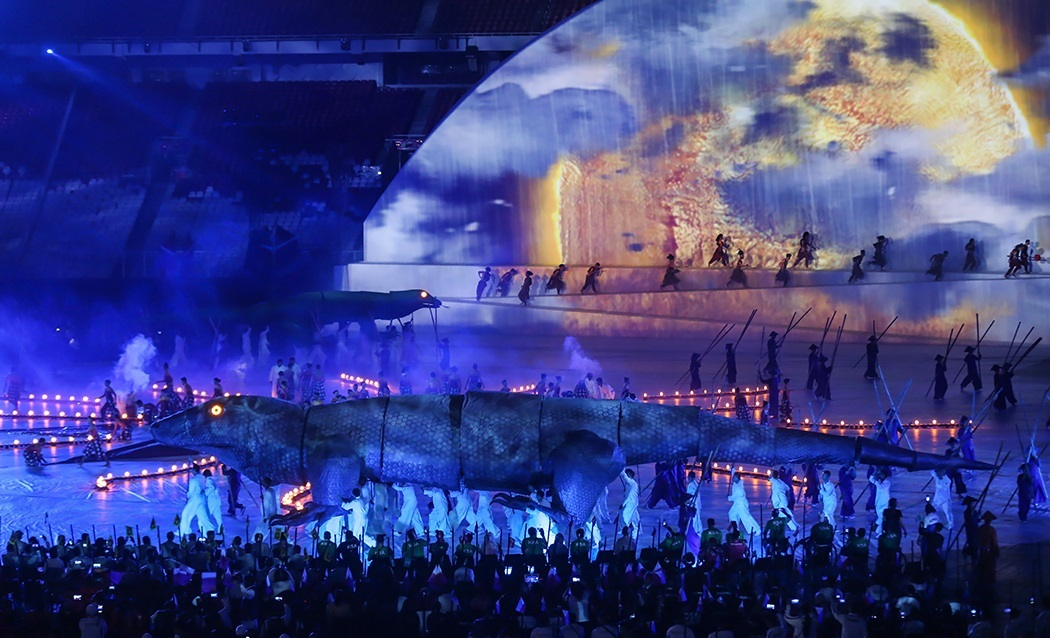
Komodo dragon attraction at the opening ceremony of 2018 Asian Para Games in Gelora Bung Karno Stadium.

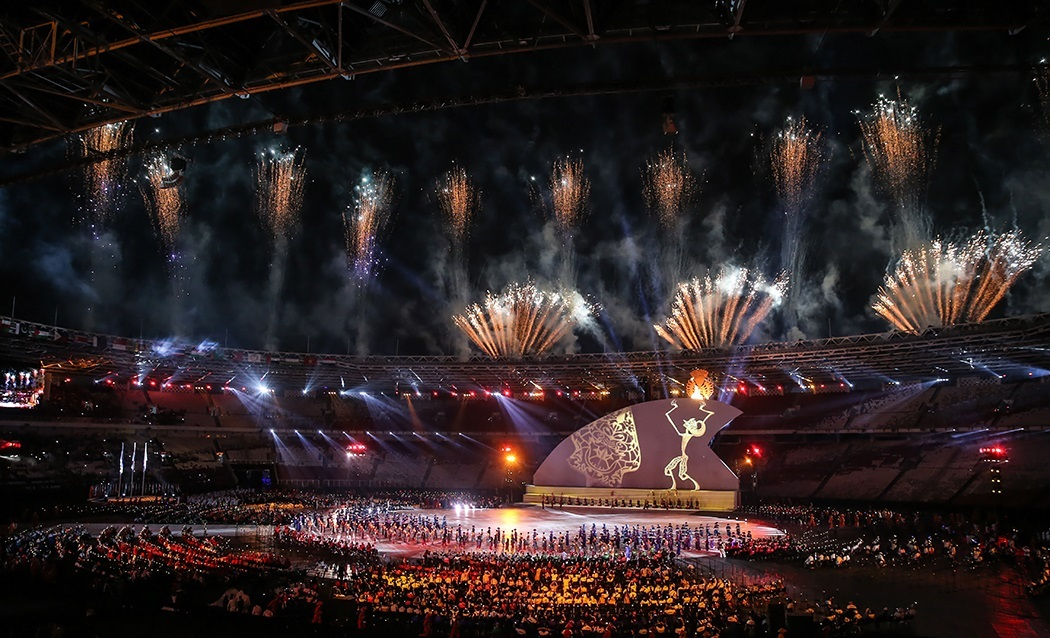
Fireworks released during the opening ceremony after the cauldron was lit.

Before the ceremony commenced, visual effects video of Indonesian traditional batik art, featuring Indonesian wayang characters, objects, buildings such as the National Monument, flora and fauna found within Indonesia such as Komodo dragon was shown.

The ceremony began with countdown projection on the floor of the stage when a whipping dancer performed on the stage with a row of drummers. Rosalina Oktavia, an Indonesian prosthetic model carried a candle onto the stage centre. After that, dancers wearing traditional costumes of different Indonesian ethnic groups came onstage in groups, perform traditional dances while carrying miniatures of various houses of worship found across the nation to represent the Indonesia's religious and cultural diversity. Two guests of honour, President of Indonesia Joko Widodo and president of the Asian Paralympic Committee Majid Rashed who arrived earlier at the stadium were introduced to the crowd.

Then, children elementary schools from Jakarta and Bengkala, the deaf village from Bali, who wore school uniforms entered the stage riding cycle rickshaws and sat on the stage, with the projection of a school and the flag of Indonesia shown on the stage screen. Puan Maharani, chairwoman of the games' steering committee brought the Indonesian flag into the stadium, and the flag was raised by three Paskibraka youth troop. During the flag raising, traditional dancers and the school children's translated the "Indonesia Raya" lyrics into sign language. Surya Sahetapy and Reza Rahadian Matulessy delivered the message of Pancasila in Indonesian sign and spoken language, respectively. Two Filipino para dancers, Jun Julius Obero and Rhea Marquez performed a ballet number together, which represents the harmonious unity of a society that accepts each other, regardless of their differences. The song played during the ballet was a variation of the second lyrical music part used in the Ratoh Jaroe dance performed on the 2018 Asian Games opening ceremony.

During the Parade of Nations, North Korean and South Korean teams marched together under one unified flag of Korea as they did at the Asian Games. As per tradition, Indonesia as the host nation entered last. During the 1-hour long segment, 20 Asian Pop Songs were used for guest participating teams, while choir covers of the refrains of "Kebyar-Kebyar" and "Garuda di Dadaku" were used for host Indonesia team. Each time a national delegatation enters the stadium, the spirals rotating on the centre stage display the colours of the flag of their home country.

The pop songs played included:

- "Revolution" by Crystal Kay (feat. Namie Amuro)
- "Power" by Exo
- "Party Animal" by Mayday
- "Lil’ Touch" by Girls' Generation
- "Hero" by Namie Amuro
- "Bhaag Milkha Bhaag" by Siddharth Mahadevan
- "View" by Shinee
- "Live in the Moment" by Hala Al Turk
- "You N Me" by JJ Lin
- "Dahil Sa'yo" by Iñigo Pascual
- "Kyom Min Sok Chet Te" by Laura Mam
- "Black Suit" by Super Junior
- "Faghat Ba to Esgham" by Shadmehr Aghili
- "Goodbye" by G.E.M.
- "Jai Ho" by A. R. Rahman
- "The Player" by Jolin Tsai
- "Mae Giew" by Palmy
- "Moonlight Thoughts" by SING
- "Delbar" by Omid Hajili
- "Fake Love" by BTS

A minute of silence to honour the 2018 Sulawesi earthquake and tsunami victims was observed after speeches from the Organizing Committee chairman Raja Sapta Oktohari and President Majid Rashed of the Asian Paralympic Committee.

President Widodo officially opened the games using sign language, on which he mistakenly spoke "Asian Games" instead of "Asian Para Games".

A dance performance featured the fire, rain, ocean and fisherman was held which later revealed the word sign "DISABILITY" on the stage. It represents the challenges a disabled person faced in the society. A wheelchair girl named Bulan Karunia showed up at the stadium with a box containing the message of her and her friends to President Joko Widodo. The president, then, walked down onto the stage to meet her and opened the box which later revealed to contain the letter block that reads "Ability" in capital letters. Along with her and an archer named Abdul Hamid, he arched the giant capital letters "DIS" until it fell down, and left the word "ABILITY" to represents that disabled persons can also pursuing their dreams and do what normal people do also with their limited abilities. Martin Losu and Lil abilities dance troop then performed hip hop and break dance in front of the sign.

Eight Indonesian athletes, including powerlifter Anto Boi carried the Asian Paralympic Committee flag into the stadium, and the flag was raised by ten Paskibraka youth troop as the Paralympic movement anthem was played. These were the last games to play this anthem, as the Asian Paralympic Committee adopted its own beginning the next edition in Hangzhou. Indonesian table tennis player Banyu Tri Mulyo read the athletes' oath, table tennis judge Bayu Widi read the judges' oath, and swimming coach Dinda Ayu Sekartaji read the coaches' oath.

Finally, the torch was relayed for the final time by Senny Marbun (president of the National Paralympic Committee of Indonesia), Imam Nahrawi (Youth and Sports Minister of Indonesia), Pribadi (general secretary of the NPC Indonesia), and Soeharto (gold medalist athletics in the 1977 FESPIC Games). Jendi Panggabean, five-gold medalist para-swimming in the 2017 ASEAN Para Games, as the last torchbearer lit the in-stadium cauldron start from the bottom of the left edge of wave-shape projector, with a gigantic wayang puppet's character named Gatot Kaca, on shadow projector guided the flame until it spread and lit in a Garuda-shaped cauldron – inspired by Blencong, source lighting in the wayang – with the wayang's hands "holding" it, which followed by the lit-off of the actual cauldron located southeast of the stadium and fireworks bursts. The ceremony concluded with various singers sang the theme song of the games, "Song of Victory".

=== Parade of Nations ===
All 42 contingents (41 nations and the unified Korea team) participated in the parade, the order begins with Afghanistan and ended with host Indonesia. Each contingent was led by a representative official that wore local traditional costumes with Indonesian floral designs while carrying each country's name placard. The costume was designed by Chitra Subiyakto.

Like the Asian Games, the nations marched in English alphabetical order. Below is a list of parading countries and their announced flag bearer, in the same order as the parade. This is sortable by country name, flag bearer's name and flag bearer's sport. Names are given in the form officially designated by the APC.

Order	Nation	Flag bearer	Sport
1	Afghanistan (AFG)		
2	Bahrain (BRN)		
3	Bhutan (BHU)		
4	Brunei (BRU)		
5	Cambodia (CAM)		
6	China (CHN)	Zou Lihong	Athletics
7	Hong Kong (HKG)	Yu Chui Yee	Wheelchair fencing
8	India (IND)	Mariyappan Thangavelu	Athletics
9	Iran (IRI)	Sareh Javanmardi	Shooting
10	Iraq (IRQ)		
11	Japan (JPN)	Kaede Maegawa	Athletics
12	Jordan (JOR)		
13	Kazakhstan (KAZ)	Anuar Akhmetov	Swimming
14	Korea (COR)	Kim Sun-mi (South Korea)	Wheelchair fencing
14	Korea (COR)	Sim Sung-hyok (North Korea)	Swimming
15	Kuwait (KUW)		
16	Kyrgyzstan (KGZ)		
17	Laos (LAO)		
18	Lebanon (LBN)		
19	Macau (MAC)		
20	Malaysia (MAS)	Abu Bakar Nyat	Bowling
21	Mongolia (MGL)		
22	Myanmar (MYA)		
23	Nepal (NEP)		
24	Oman (OMA)		
25	Pakistan (PAK)		
26	Palestine (PLE)		
27	Philippines (PHI)		
28	Qatar (QAT)	Nasser Al Sahoti	Athletics
29	Saudi Arabia (KSA)		
30	Singapore (SGP)	Nur Syahidah Alim	Archery
31	Sri Lanka (SRI)	Dinesh Priyantha	Athletics
32	Syria (SYR)		
33	Chinese Taipei (TPE)		
34	Tajikistan (TJK)		
35	Thailand (THA)		
36	Timor-Leste (TLS)		
37	Turkmenistan (TKM)		
38	United Arab Emirates (UAE)		
39	Uzbekistan (UZB)		
40	Vietnam (VIE)		
41	Yemen (YEM)		
42	Indonesia (INA)	Laura Aurelia Dinda Sekar Devanti	Swimming

=== Notable singers ===
- Shanna Shannon Siswanto (performing "Indonesia Raya" (Indonesian National Anthem))
- Allafta Hirzi Sodiq (performing "Heal the World", albeit in short piano rendition)
- All recording artists of "Song of Victory"

=== Notable guests (Opening) ===
==== Indonesians (Opening) ====
- Joko Widodo, President of Indonesia
- Iriana, First Lady of Indonesia
- Jusuf Kalla, Vice President of Indonesia
- Mufidah Mi'ad Saad, Second Lady of Indonesia
- Megawati Sukarnoputri, former president (and previously vice president) of Indonesia
- Sinta Nuriyah, former First Lady of Indonesia, and her daughters Yenny and Inayah Wahid
- Try Sutrisno and Boediono, former vice presidents of Indonesia
- Tuti Sutiawati, former Second Lady of Indonesia
- Puan Maharani, Coordinating Minister for Human Development and Cultural Affairs of Indonesia and Indonesia Asian Para Games Organizing Committee (INAPGOC) steering committee chairwoman
- Imam Nahrawi, Youth and Sports Minister of Indonesia and INAPGOC organizing committee chairman
- Retno Marsudi, Foreign Minister of Indonesia
- Abdurrahman Mohammad Fachir, Deputy Foreign Minister of Indonesia
- Rudiantara, Communication and Information Technology Minister of Indonesia
- Syafruddin, Minister of State Apparatus Utilization and Bureaucratic Reform of Indonesia
- Pratikno, State Secretary Minister of Indonesia
- Zulkifli Hasan, Speaker of the Congress of Indonesia
- Bambang Soesatyo, Speaker of the House of Representatives of Indonesia
- Oesman Sapta Odang, Speaker of the Senate of Indonesia
- Laode Muhammad Syarif, vice chairman of the Corruption Eradication Commission of Indonesia
- Triawan Munaf, head of the Creative Economy Agency of Indonesia
- Suharso Monoarfa, member of the Presidential Advisory Council of Indonesia
- Heru Budi Hartono, head of the Presidential Secretariat of Indonesia
- Mohamad Oemar, head of the Vice-Presidential Secretariat of Indonesia
- Anies Baswedan, Governor of Jakarta and INAPGOC steering committee member
- Raja Sapta Oktohari, chairman of the INAPGOC executive committee
- Senny Marbun, president of the National Paralympic Committee of Indonesia (NPC Indonesia)
- Pribadi, general secretary of the NPC Indonesia
- Jan Ethes Srinarendra, grandson of President Widodo and First Lady Iriana

==== Foreign dignitaries (Opening) ====
- Majid Rashed, president of the Asian Paralympic Committee (APC)
- Abdullah Ahmad Badawi, former Prime Minister of Malaysia
- Jeanne Abdullah, former "First Lady" of Malaysia

== Closing ceremony ==
2018 Asian Para Games closing ceremony
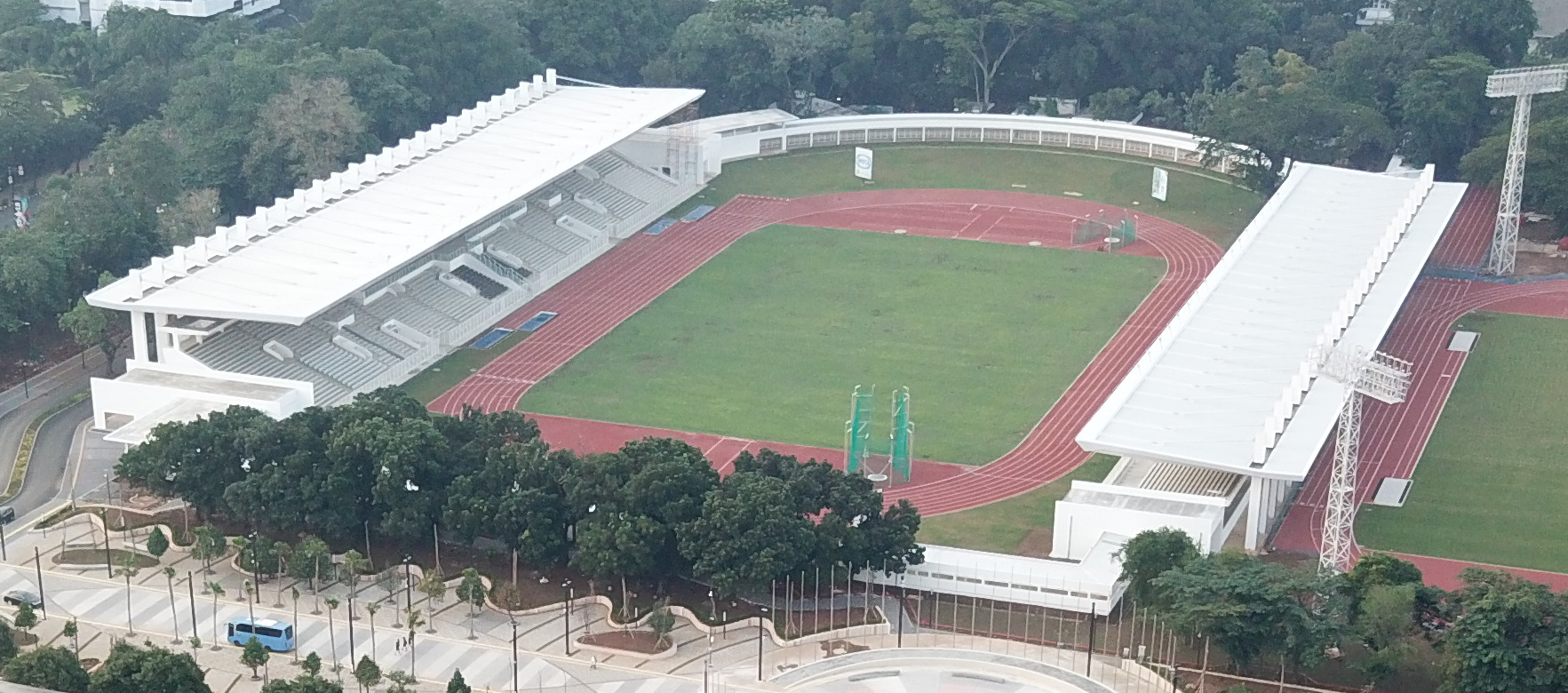
- Venue of the closing ceremony
- Date: 13 October 2018; 8 years ago
- Time: 19:00 – 22:00 WIB (UTC+7)
- Location: Jakarta, Indonesia; 6°13′7″S 106°48′9″E
- Filmed by: TVRI; INAPGOC Broadcast Division
- Footage: Closing Ceremony on YouTube

The 2018 Asian Para Games closing ceremony was held on Saturday, 13 October 2018 at the Gelora Bung Karno Madya Stadium in Jakarta. Vice President of Indonesia Jusuf Kalla, and president of the Asian Paralympic Committee Majid Rashed were among the dignitaries in attendance.

Daniel Mananta and Ary Kirana were the ceremony's host while Riri Mestica was the ceremony's DJ. Vice President Kalla and Raja Sapta Oktohari, chairman of the INAPGOC executive committee both delivered bilingual speeches before and after the flag handover ceremony. Zhang Haidi, chairwoman of China Administration of Sports for Persons with Disabilities received the box containing the Ability letters used during the opening ceremony from president of the National Paralympic Committee of Indonesia Senny Marbun while Vice Mayor of Hangzhou Wang Hong received the APC flag from Governor of Jakarta Anies Baswedan. A promotional video about the Hangzhou Asian Para Games featuring shots of the city, Jack Ma and disabled athletes was shown. After Majid Rashed officially closed the games, the flame was extinguished by the wayang puppet on shadow projector.

=== Performing artists ===
In addition to local artists and a Hangzhou Asian Para Games promotional video segment, the South Korean girlband AOA performed in the ceremony.

==== Indonesian artists ====
- Naura and Zizi (performing "Sang Juara")
- Sheryl Sheinafia and Claudia (performing "Dream High")
- Rio Febrian (performing "Matahari", "Jenuh" and "Terlalu Cinta")
- NTRL (performing "Garuda di Dadaku")
- Judika (performing "Sampai Kau Jadi Milikku", "Aku Yang Tersakiti" and "Jikalau Kau Cinta")
- Cokelat (performing "Karma", "Luka Lama", "Garuda" and "Bendera")

==== Foreign artists ====
- (South Korea) AOA (performing "I'm Jelly Baby", "Bingle Bangle", "Excuse Me", "Heart Attack")

=== Notable guests (Closing) ===
==== Indonesians (Closing) ====
- Jusuf Kalla, Vice President of Indonesia
- Mufidah Mi'ad Saad, Second Lady of Indonesia
- Puan Maharani, Coordinating Minister for Human Development and Cultural Affairs of Indonesia and Indonesia Asian Para Games Organizing Committee (INAPGOC) steering committee chairwoman
- Imam Nahrawi, Youth and Sports Minister of Indonesia and INAPGOC organizing committee chairman
- Syafruddin, Minister of State Apparatus Utilization and Bureaucratic Reform of Indonesia
- Anies Baswedan, Governor of Jakarta and INAPGOC steering committee member
- Raja Sapta Oktohari, chairman of the INAPGOC executive committee
- Senny Marbun, president of the National Paralympic Committee of Indonesia (NPC Indonesia)

==== Foreign dignitaries (Closing) ====
- Majid Rashed, president of the Asian Paralympic Committee (APC)
- Zhang Haidi, chairwoman of China Administration of Sports for Persons with Disabilities
- Wang Hong, Vice Mayor of Hangzhou

== See also ==
- 2018 Asian Games opening ceremony
- 2018 Asian Games closing ceremony
- 2018 Asian Games Parade of Nations
