= Bhutan at the 2026 Asian Para Games =

- IPC code: BHU
- NPC: Bhutan Paralympic Committee

in Aichi–Nagoya, Japan 18–24 October 2026
- Competitors: 3 (2 men and 1 woman) in 3 sports
- Medals: Gold 0 Silver 0 Bronze 0 Total 0

Asian Para Games appearances
- 2018; 2022; 2026

Bhutan is competing at the 2026 Asian Para Games in Aichi Prefecture and Nagoya, Japan from 18 to 24 October 2026. This is nation's third appearance at the Asian Para Games since the inception of the Bhutan Paralympic Committee in 2017. The delegation has three athletes.

== Competitors ==
The following is the list of number of competitors participating in the Games:

Sport	Men	Women	Total
Archery	1	-	1
Badminton	1	-	1
Shooting	-	1	1
Total	2	1	3

== Archery ==
Tika Ghalley competed in the recurve men archery event.

Archer	Event	Ranking Round		Round of 32	Round of 16	Quarterfinals	Semi-finals	Final / BM	
Archer	Event	Score	Seed	Opposition Score	Opposition Score	Opposition Score	Opposition Score	Opposition Score	Rank
Tika Ghalley	Men's recurve	565	19	Tadatsugu (JPN); W 6–5	Zhao (CHN); L 0–6	Did not advance			13

== Badminton ==
Cheyang Kuenchap is the sole badminton player for Bhutan.

Athlete	Event	Group stage				Round of 16	Quarterfinals	Semifinals	Final	
Athlete	Event	Opposition Score	Opposition Score	Opposition Score	Rank	Opposition Score	Opposition Score	Opposition Score	Opposition Score	Rank
Cheyang Kuenchap	Men's WH2	Rakjaingam (THA); L 0-2 _{(8-21, 8-21)}	Bin Noorlan (MAS); L 0-2 _{(10-21, 8-21)}	Kim (KOR); L 0-2 _{(7-21, 7-21)}	Did not advance					17

== Shooting ==
Kinley Dem would be representing Bhutan in Para Shooting for the third time.

Athlete	Event	Qualification		Final	
Athlete	Event	Score	Rank	Score	Rank
Kinley Dem	R1 10m Air Rifle SH1	611.3	16	Did not advance	

== See also ==
- Bhutan at the 2026 Asian Games
