= Zhong Huanghao =

Chinese Paralympic athlete

Personal information
- Born: 14 September 1998 (age 27)

Sport
- Country: China
- Sport: Para-athletics
- Disability: Cerebral palsy
- Disability class: T38
- Events: Long jump; 100 metres; 200 metres; 400 metres
Medal record
Paralympic Games
Silver medal – second place	2016 Rio de Janeiro	Long jump T38
Silver medal – second place	2024 Paris	Long jump T38
World Championships
Gold medal – first place	2024 Kobe	Long jump T38
Silver medal – second place	2017 London	Long jump T38
Silver medal – second place	2023 Paris	Long jump T38
Bronze medal – third place	2025 New Delhi	Long jump T38
Asian Para Games
Silver medal – second place	2018 Jakarta	400 m T38
Silver medal – second place	2018 Jakarta	Long jump T37/38
Silver medal – second place	2022 Hangzhou	Long jump T37/38
Bronze medal – third place	2018 Jakarta	100 m T38
Bronze medal – third place	2018 Jakarta	200 m T38
Bronze medal – third place	2022 Hangzhou	100 m T38

Zhong Huanghao (born 14 September 1998) is a Chinese Paralympic athlete with cerebral palsy. He won the silver medal in the men's long jump T38 event at the 2016 Summer Paralympics.

== Career ==
Zhong represented China at the 2016 Summer Paralympics in Rio de Janeiro, Brazil and he won the silver medal in the men's long jump T38 event.

At the 2017 World Para Athletics Championships held in London, United Kingdom he won the silver medal in the men's long jump T38 event.

In 2018, he competed at the Asian Para Games held in Jakarta, Indonesia where he won two silver medals and two bronze medals.
