= Anandan Gunasekaran =

Indian track and field athlete

Personal information
- Nationality: Indian
- Born: Anandan Gunasekaran; 18 March 1987 (age 39) Kumbakonam, Tamil Nadu India
- Height: 177 cm (5 ft 10 in)
- Weight: 69 kg (152 lb)

Sport
- Country: India
- Sport: Track and field
- Events: 100m, 200m, 400m
- Turned pro: 2014
Medal record
Men's track and field
Representing India
Military World Games
Gold medal – first place	2019 Wuhan	100m
Gold medal – first place	2019 Wuhan	200m
Gold medal – first place	2019 Wuhan	400m
Asian Para Games
Silver medal – second place	2018 Jakarta	400m T44/62/64
Bronze medal – third place	2018 Jakarta	200m T44/62/64
National Para Athletics Championships 2018
Gold medal – first place	Panchkula	200m
Silver medal – second place	Panchkula	400m
World Para Grand Prix 2017
Silver medal – second place	Dubai	400m

Anandan Gunasekaran (born 18 March 1987; Kumbakonam, Tamil Nadu) is an Indian track and field para-athletics runner who competes in the men's 100m, 200m and 400m events in the T64 category. He has participated at many international events. In 2018, he represented India at the Asian Para Games 2018 which was held in Jakarta, Indonesia from 6 to 13 October 2018 and won silver in the 400 meters and bronze in the 200 meters. He is the first athlete in the country to have won 3 gold medals in the Military World Games 2019 held in Wuhan, China, first Asian blade runner to create a new Asian record of completing 400m race in 52.66s at the 2018 National Open Para-Athletic Championship.

In 2016, Anandan set a new Asian record in the men's 400m by clocking 54.67s at the 2016 Asian Para Athletics Championships. He is also the first Indian blade runner to create two Asian records in the 400m. He was an able-bodied athlete before he lost a leg in an explosion that occurred along the LoC.

== Early life ==
Anandan was born in Kumbakonam, Tamil Nadu on 18 March 1987. As a 3 year old, he used to actively run around his kindergarten school Shankara Vidyala School. In grade 6 in Native Higher Secondary School, he had secured the first prize in 800m and 1500m race.

Born into a poor family, Anandan used to distribute newspapers to financially contribute to his father's income. One day, his cycle was punctured, so he continued the job running. It started as a fun activity, but he was soon running at state and national level events. By the twelfth standard, Anandan was all in as a serious runner. Inspired by the story of Indian soldiers at Kargil War, Anandan went into the army. In a training camp in Banglore, he ran a 12 km track which got him into the army's team. However, sports needed plenty of nutritional supplements, and on his salary, Anandan struggled to get it. But he continued to participate in racing competitions and brought the country numerous prizes.

In 2008, he was posted in Kupwara district of Jammu and Kashmir. He got injured in an explosion that took place along the Line of Control (LoC) and lost a leg. In 2012, Anandan ran 2.5 km in 9 min 58 sec in Mumbai marathon disabled category.

== Career ==
Anandan represented India at the 2017 IPC World Para Athletics Championships in London. He also represented India at the 2019 Military World Games and claimed three gold medals in athletics events.

== Achievements ==
=== International competitions ===
Representing India
Year	Competition	Venue	Position	Event
2014	International Paralympic Grand Prix of 2014	Tunisia, Africa	2nd place, silver medalist(s)	100 m
2014	International Paralympic Grand Prix of 2014	Tunisia, Africa	1st place, gold medalist(s)	200 m
2014	International Paralympic Grand Prix of 2014	Tunisia, Africa	1st place, gold medalist(s)	4 × 100 m relay
2014	2014 Asian Para Games	Incheon, South Korea	6th	100 m
2014	2014 Asian Para Games	Incheon, South Korea	6th	200 m
2015	Sri Lanka Army Para Games 2015	Colombo, Sri Lanka	2nd place, silver medalist(s)	100 m
2015	Sri Lanka Army Para Games 2015	Colombo, Sri Lanka	1st place, gold medalist(s)	200 m
2015	2015 Military World Games	Mungyeong, South Korea	2nd place, silver medalist(s)	100 m
2015	2015 Military World Games	Mungyeong, South Korea	1st place, gold medalist(s)	200 m
2016	Asia Oceania Para Athletics Championship 2016	Dubai	2nd place, silver medalist(s)	200 m
2016	Asia Oceania Para Athletics Championship 2016	Dubai	1st place, gold medalist(s)	400 m
2017	Faza International Grand Prix of 2017	Dubai	2nd place, silver medalist(s)	400 m
2017	2017 World Para Athletics Championships	London, United Kingdom	8th	400 m
2018	Fazza International Athletics Championship	Dubai	2nd place, silver medalist(s)	200 m
2018	Fazza International Athletics Championship	Dubai	1st place, gold medalist(s)	400 m
2018	Sharjah International Athletics Grand Prix 2018	Dubai	1st place, gold medalist(s)	100 m
2018	Sharjah International Athletics Grand Prix 2018	Dubai	1st place, gold medalist(s)	200 m
2018	Sharjah International Athletics Grand Prix 2018	Dubai	2nd place, silver medalist(s)	400 m
2018	2018 Asian Para Games	Jakarta, Indonesia	3rd place, bronze medalist(s)	200 m
2018	2018 Asian Para Games	Jakarta, Indonesia	2nd place, silver medalist(s)	400 m
2019	World Para Athletics Grand Prix	Paris, France	1st place, gold medalist(s)	200 m
2019	7th CISM World Military Games	Wuhan, China	1st place, gold medalist(s)	100 m
2019	7th CISM World Military Games	Wuhan, China	1st place, gold medalist(s)	200 m
2019	7th CISM World Military Games	Wuhan, China	1st place, gold medalist(s)	400 m

=== National competitions ===
Year	Competition	Venue	Position	Event
2015	Senior Para National Athletic Championship	Ghaziabad, Uttar Pradesh	1st place, gold medalist(s)	100 m
2015	Senior Para National Athletic Championship	Ghaziabad, Uttar Pradesh	1st place, gold medalist(s)	200 m
2015	Senior Para National Athletic Championship	Ghaziabad, Uttar Pradesh	1st place, gold medalist(s)	400 m
2017	17th Senior Para National Athletic Championship	Jaipur, Rajasthan	2nd place, silver medalist(s)	100 m
2017	17th Senior Para National Athletic Championship	Jaipur, Rajasthan	1st place, gold medalist(s)	400 m
2017	17th Senior Para National Athletic Championship	Jaipur, Rajasthan	2nd place, silver medalist(s)	4 × 100 m relay
2017	17th Senior Para National Athletic Championship	Jaipur, Rajasthan	1st place, gold medalist(s)	4x400
2018	18th Senior Para National Athletic Championship	Panchkula, Haryana	1st place, gold medalist(s)	200 m
2018	18th Senior Para National Athletic Championship	Panchkula, Haryana	2nd place, silver medalist(s)	400 m
2018	18th Senior Para National Athletic Championship	Panchkula, Haryana	3rd place, bronze medalist(s)	4 × 100 m relay
2018	18th Senior Para National Athletic Championship	Panchkula, Haryana	2nd place, silver medalist(s)	4 × 400 m relay
2018	Indian Open Para Athletic Championship	Bangalore, Karnataka	2nd place, silver medalist(s)	100 m
2018	Indian Open Para Athletic Championship	Bangalore, Karnataka	1st place, gold medalist(s)	200 m
2018	Indian Open Para Athletic Championship	Bangalore, Karnataka	1st place, gold medalist(s)	400 m
