= Qatar at the 2018 Asian Para Games =

- IPC code: QAT
- NPC: Qatar Paralympic Committee

in Jakarta 06-13 October 2018
- Competitors: 13 in 2 sports
- Flag bearer: Nasser Al Sahoti
- Medals Ranked 32nd: Gold 0 Silver 1 Bronze 0 Total 1

Asian Para Games appearances
- 2010; 2014; 2018; 2022

Qatar participated at the 2018 Asian Para Games which was held in Jakarta, Indonesia from 6 to 13 October 2018. The Qatari delegation was composed of 13 athletes who participated in two sports: seven in athletics and six in goalball. Abdulqader al-Mutawa was the head of the delegation, Mohamed Deheem al-Dosari was the deputy head of the mission, and Mohamed Suhail was the technical expert. Qatar won its sole medal through Sarah Hamdi Masoud in the sport of athletics.

== Medalist ==
Medal	Name	Sport	Event	Date
Silver	Sarah Hamdi Masoud	Athletics	Women's Shot Put F33	09 Oct

== Athletics ==
Competitors:

- Abdulrahman Abdulqadir
- Nasser Al Sahouti
- Khalid Al Hajri
- Debais Al Dosari
- Mohammad Al Abd
- Mohammad Rahsed Al Kebaisi
- Sara Hamdi Masoud

== Goalball ==
Coach: Abdulqader Khadim

Competitors:

- Mohammad Hamam Al Mohammad
- Mohammad Al Kahalout
- Abbad Shamali
- Ikrami Murad
- Hassan Al Kohaji
- Abdulhadi Al Marri

== See also ==
- Qatar at the 2018 Asian Games
