= Gelora Bung Karno Madya Stadium =

Sports stadium in Central Jakarta, Indonesia

- Stadion Madya Gelora Bung Karno
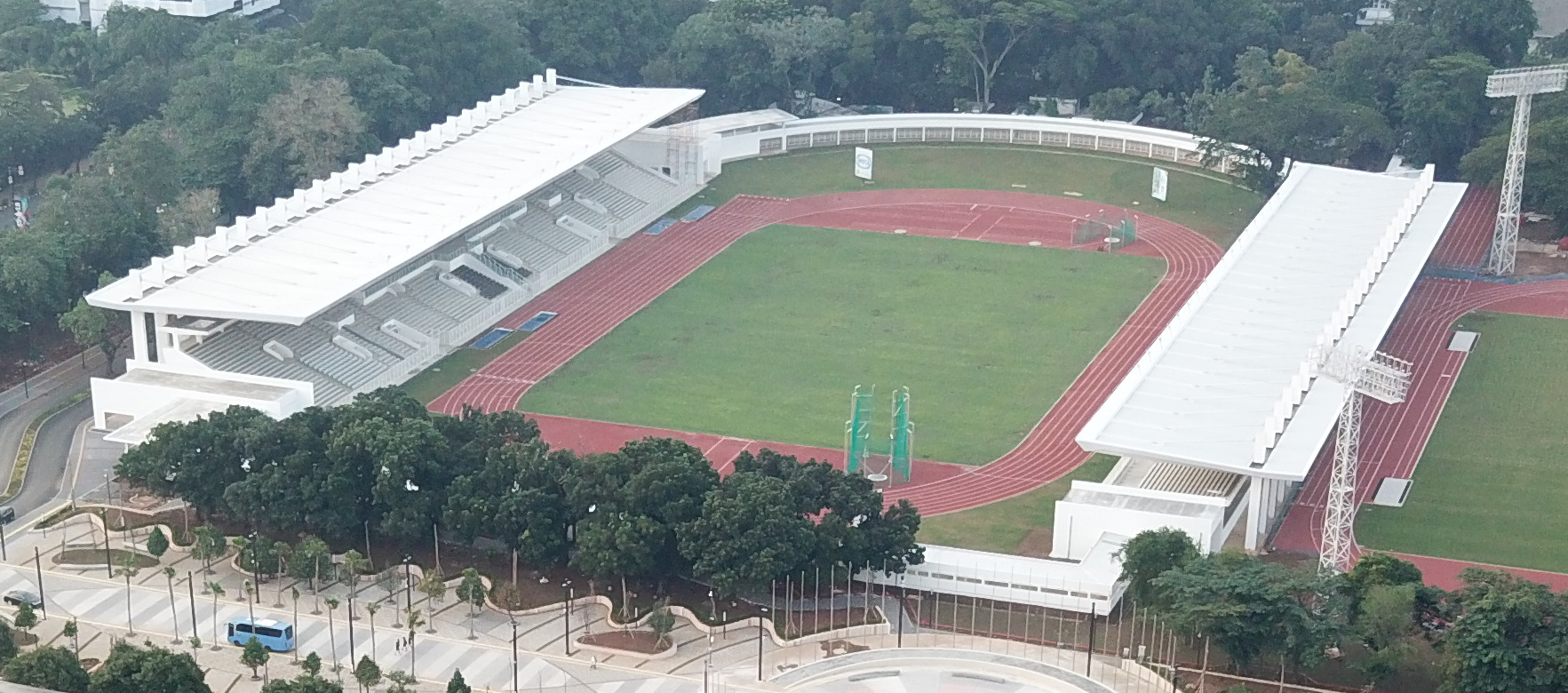
- Interactive map of Gelora Bung Karno Madya Stadium
- Former names: Senayan Hockey Stadium; Senayan Open Stadium; Senayan Madya Stadium
- Address: Gelora Bung Karno Sports Complex
- Location: Gelora, Tanah Abang, Central Jakarta, Indonesia
- Coordinates: 6°13′1″S 106°47′57″E
- Owner: Government of Indonesia (via Ministry of the State Secretariat)
- Operator: Pusat Pengelolaan Komplek Gelora Bung Karno (Gelora Bung Karno Complex Management Center)
- Capacity: 9,170
- Surface: Manila grass
- Public transit: Istora Mandiri; Palmerah; Senayan Bank Jakarta; Gerbang Pemuda

Construction
- Groundbreaking: 8 February 1960; 66 years ago
- Opened: December 1961; 64 years ago
- Renovated: 1985; 2016–2018

Website
- GBK.id/stadion-madya/

Gelora Bung Karno Madya Stadium (Indonesian: Stadion Madya Gelora Bung Karno), or simply the Madya Stadium, is a stadium in the Gelora Bung Karno Sports Complex with 9,170 seats. It is used mostly for track and field athletics training and events. It is located west-northwest of the complex's Main Stadium.

== History ==
Opened in December 1961, it was used as the venue for the field hockey event of the 1962 Asian Games, during which it was known as the Senayan Hockey Stadium or the Senayan Open Stadium (Indonesian: Stadion Terbuka Senayan). The stadium was later renovated, converted into an athletics stadium, and hosted the 1985 Asian Athletics Championships.The stadium was also used as a warm-up venue for the 2018 Asian Games and closing ceremony of the 2018 Asian Para Games. This stadium was briefly used by Bhayangkara during their 2019 season, amid renovations of their home ground PTIK Stadium.

== Entertainment events ==
Date	Artist(s)	Event	Ref.
28 December 2022	Seventeen	Be The Sun World Tour	
11 February 2023	Westlife	The Wild Dreams Tour	
25 May 2024	Avenged Sevenfold	Life Is but a Dream... Tour	
16 February 2025	Linkin Park	From Zero World Tour	
3 May 2025	Day6	Day6 3rd World Tour "Forever Young"	
21 November 2026	Guns N' Roses	Guns N' Roses World Tour 2026	

== International football matches ==
Date	Competition	Team 1	Res.	Team 2	Attendance
2 June 2024	Friendly	Indonesia	0–0	Tanzania	5,831

== Gallery ==
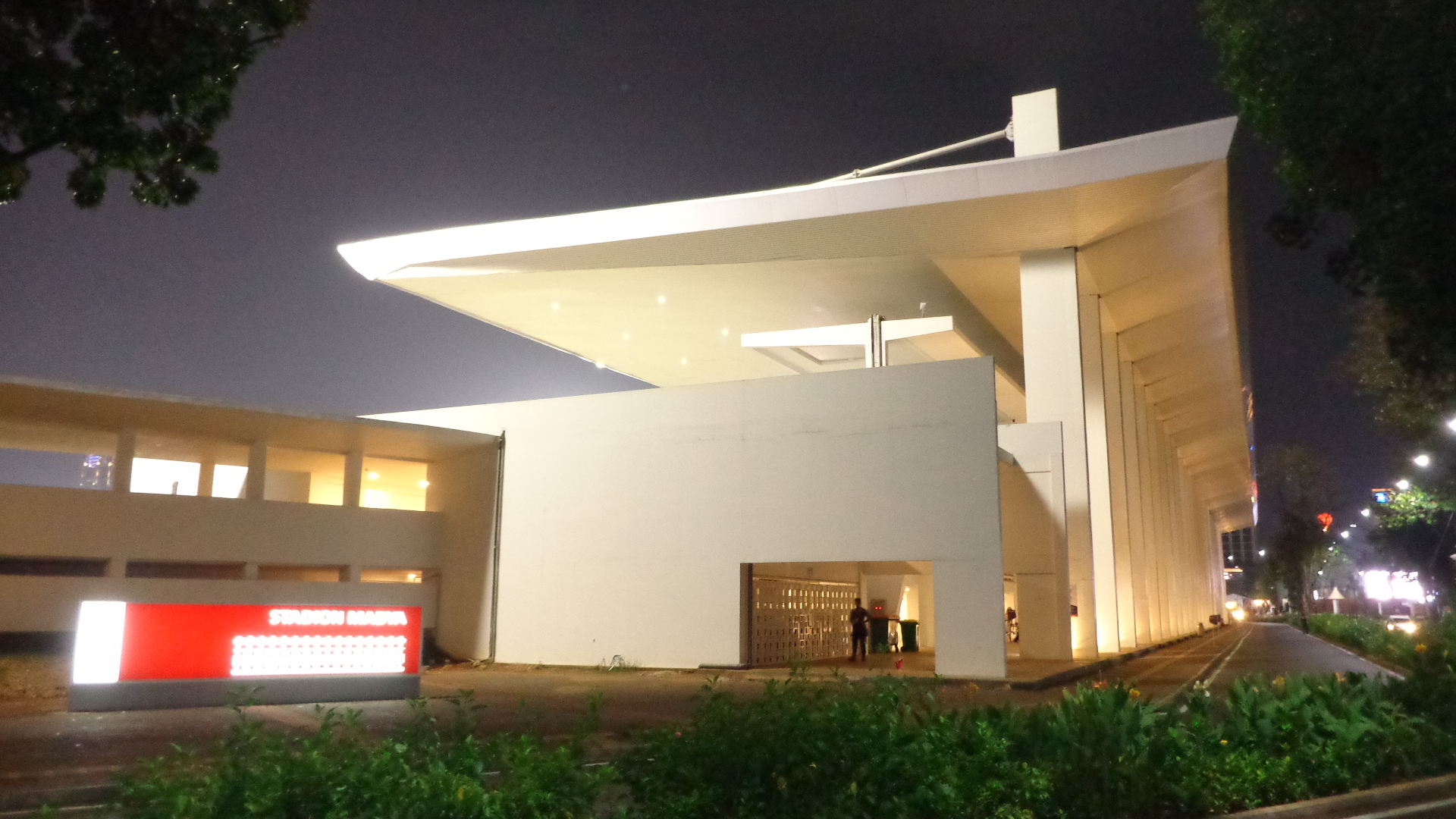
The stadium at night

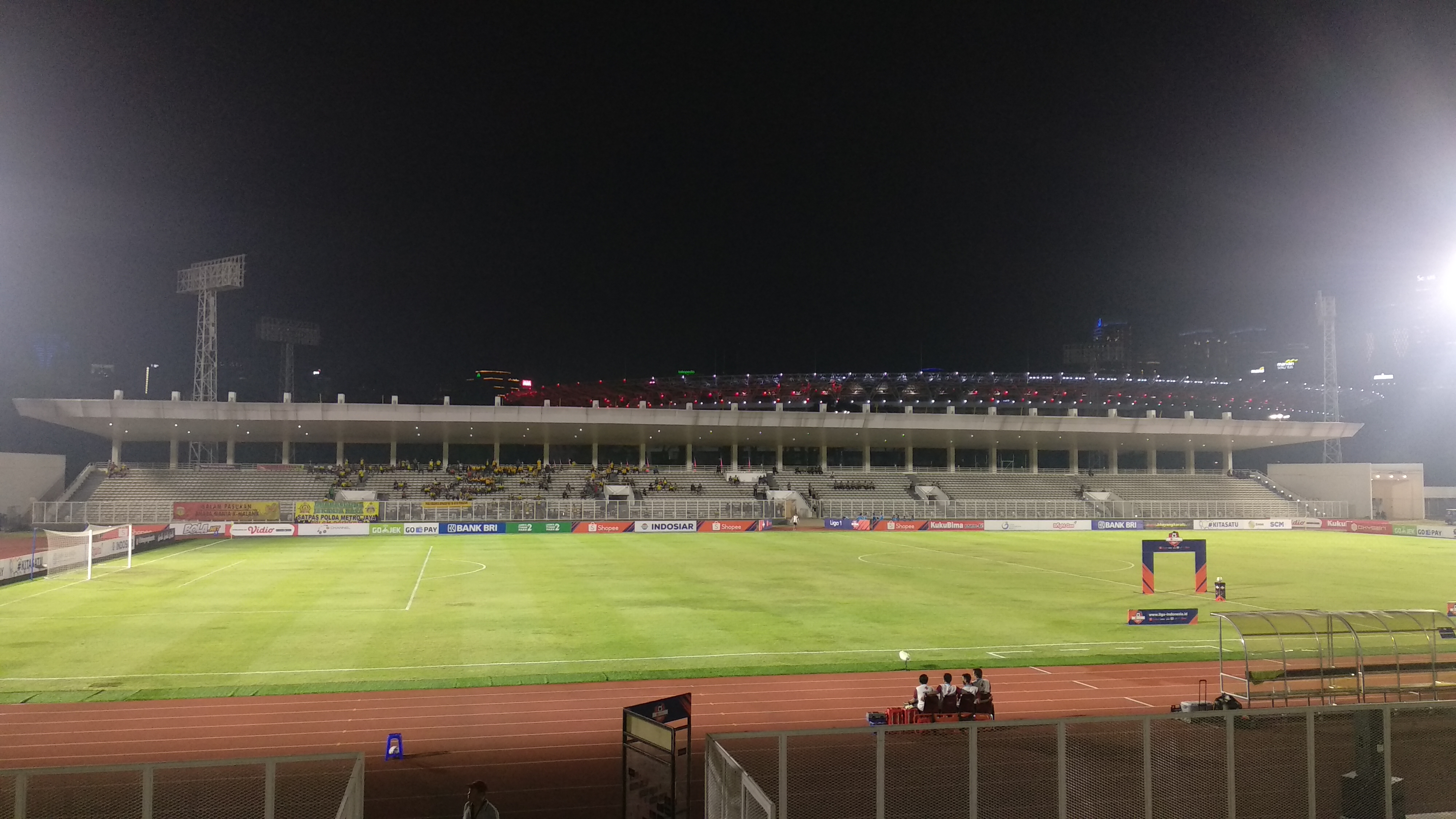
The stadium before a 2019 Liga 1 match

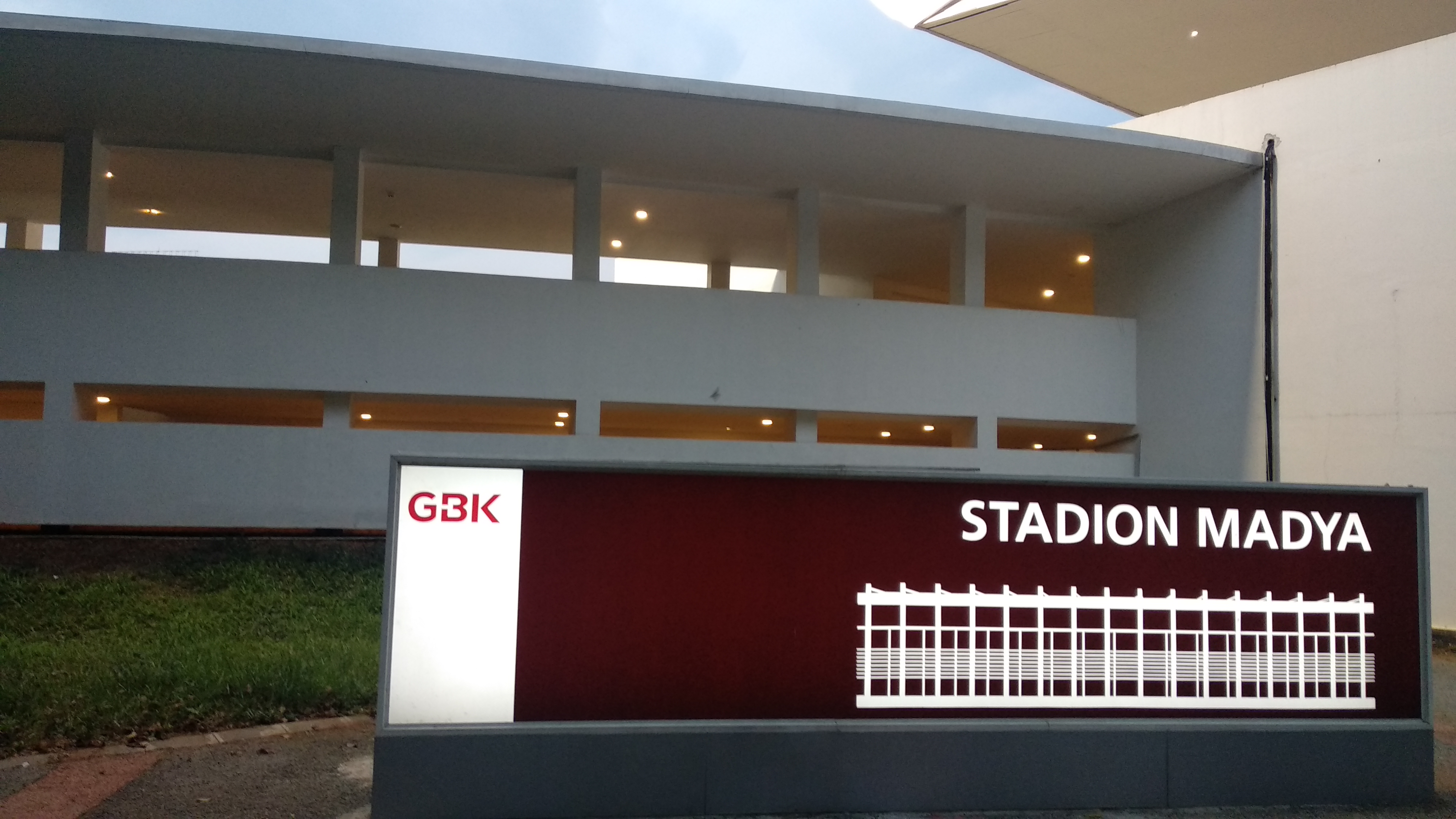
Stadium's marking

== See also ==
Gelora Bung Karno Sports Complex
