= Powerlifting at the 2018 Asian Para Games =

- Venue: Balai Sudirman
- Location: Jakarta, Indonesia
- Dates: 7–12 October

Powerlifting at the 2018 Asian Para Games was held in Jakarta between 7 and 12 October 2018.

== Medal table ==
* Host nation (Indonesia)

Rank	NPC	Gold	Silver	Bronze	Total
1	China (CHN)	10	0	0	10
2	Iran (IRI)	4	4	2	10
3	Vietnam (VIE)	2	1	1	4
4	South Korea (KOR)	1	1	1	3
5	Laos (LAO)	1	0	0	1
5	Mongolia (MGL)	1	0	0	1
5	Uzbekistan (UZB)	1	0	0	1
8	Indonesia (INA)*	0	4	2	6
9	Kazakhstan (KAZ)	0	3	2	5
10	India (IND)	0	2	2	4
11	Iraq (IRQ)	0	1	3	4
12	Philippines (PHI)	0	1	1	2
12	Syria (SYR)	0	1	1	2
12	United Arab Emirates (UAE)	0	1	1	2
15	Malaysia (MAS)	0	1	0	1
16	Chinese Taipei (TPE)	0	0	1	1
16	Japan (JPN)	0	0	1	1
16	Thailand (THA)	0	0	1	1
16	Turkmenistan (TKM)	0	0	1	1
Totals (19 entries)		20	20	20	60

== Medalists ==
=== Men ===
Event	Gold	Silver	Bronze
49 kg	Pia Laophakdee; Laos	Farman Basha; India	Parmjeet Kumar; India
54 kg	Nguyễn Bình An; Vietnam	David Degtyarev; Kazakhstan	Ali al-Darraji; Iraq
59 kg	Amir Jafari; Iran	Seyed Yousef Yousefi Pashaki; Iran	Nguyễn Văn Phúc; Vietnam
65 kg	Liu Lei; China	Bonnie Bunyau Gustin; Malaysia	Hamzeh Mohammadi; Iran
72 kg	Rouhollah Rostami; Iran	Rasool Mohsin; Iraq	Sergey Meladze; Turkmenistan
80 kg	Gu Xiaofei; China	Nader Moradi; Iran	Sudhir; India
88 kg	Ye Jixiong; China	Rakhmetzhan Khamayev; Kazakhstan	Hideki Odo; Japan
97 kg	Hamed Solhipour; Iran	Mohammed Khamis Khalaf; United Arab Emirates	Thaer al-Ali; Iraq
107 kg	Enkhbayaryn Sodnompiljee; Mongolia	Aliakbar Gharibshi; Iran	Saman Razi; Iran
+107 kg	Siamand Rahman; Iran	Mansour Pourmirzaei; Iran	Faris Al-Ageeli; Iraq

=== Women ===
Event	Gold	Silver	Bronze
41 kg	Cui Zhe; China	Ni Nengah Widiasih; Indonesia	Noura Baddour; Syria
45 kg	Guo Lingling; China	Achelle Guion; Philippines	Alina Solodukhina; Kazakhstan
50 kg	Đặng Thị Linh Phượng; Vietnam	Sakina Khatun; India	Gulbanu Abdykhalykova; Kazakhstan
55 kg	Ruza Kuzieva; Uzbekistan	Châu Hoàng Tuyết Loan; Vietnam	Rani Puji Astuti; Indonesia
61 kg	Cui Jianjin; China	Fatema al-Hasan; Syria	Somkhoun Anon; Thailand
67 kg	Tan Yujiao; China	Raushan Koishibayeva; Kazakhstan	Kim Hyeong-hui; South Korea
73 kg	Han Miaoyu; China	Nurtani Purba; Indonesia	Haifa al-Naqbi; United Arab Emirates
79 kg	Xu Lili; China	Siti Mahmudah; Indonesia	Lin Tzu-hui; Chinese Taipei
86 kg	Zheng Feifei; China	Lee Young-sun; South Korea	Ni Nengah Widiasih; Indonesia
+86 kg	Lee Hyun-jung; South Korea	Sriyanti; Indonesia	Adeline Dumapong; Philippines

== See also ==
- Powerlifting at the 2017 ASEAN Para Games
- Weightlifting at the 2018 Asian Games
