= Jalil Bagheri Jeddi =

Iranian Paralympic athlete

Personal information
- Born: 24 August 1972 (age 54) Ardabil, Iran

Sport
- Sport: Paralympic athletics
Medal record
Paralympic athletics
Representing Iran
Paralympic Games
Gold medal – first place	2012 London	Shot put – F54/55/56
Silver medal – second place	2004 Athens	Discus throw – F55
World Para Athletics Championships
Silver medal – second place	1998 Birmingham	Shot put F55
Silver medal – second place	2002 Lille	Discus throw F55
Silver medal – second place	2006 Assen	Shot put F55
Bronze medal – third place	2002 Lille	Shot put F55
Bronze medal – third place	2006 Assen	Discus throw F55
Asian Para Games
Gold medal – first place	2010 Guangzhou	Shot put F54–56
Gold medal – first place	2014 Incheon	Shot put F55/56
Silver medal – second place	2014 Incheon	Discus throw F54/55
Silver medal – second place	2018 Jakarta	Discus throw F54/55/56
Silver medal – second place	2018 Jakarta	Shot put F54/55
Bronze medal – third place	2010 Guangzhou	Discus throw F54–56

Jalil Bagheri Jeddi (born 24 August 1972) is a paralympic athlete from Iran competing mainly in category F55 shot and discus events.

Jalil competed in the shot put and discus at the 2004 Summer Paralympics winning a silver in the later event. In 2008, he competed in the shot put but could only manage twelfth place. However, Jalil succeeded in obtaining the first gold medal for Iran in the 2012 Paralympic Games held in London.
