= Alireza Ghaleh Nasseri =

Iranian Paralympic athlete

Sport
- Country: Iran
- Sport: Para-athletics
- Events: Discus throw; Shot put
Medal record
Paralympic Games
Silver medal – second place	2016 Rio de Janeiro	Discus throw F56
Islamic Solidarity Games
Silver medal – second place	2017 Baku	Discus throw F56
Silver medal – second place	2017 Baku	Shot put F56
Asian Para Games
Gold medal – first place	2018 Jakarta	Discus throw F54/55/56

Alireza Ghaleh Nasseri is an Iranian Paralympic athlete. He represented Iran at the 2016 Summer Paralympics held in Rio de Janeiro, Brazil and he won the silver medal in the men's discus throw F56 event.

In 2017, he won two medals at the Islamic Solidarity Games held in Baku, Azerbaijan: the silver medal in the men's shot put F56 event and the silver medal in the men's discus throw F56 event.

At the 2018 Asian Para Games held in Jakarta, Indonesia, he won the gold medal in the men's discus throw F54/55/56 event.
