= Oman at the 2010 Asian Para Games =

- IOC code: OMA
- NPC: Oman Paralympic Committee

in Guangzhou 12–19 December 2010
- Competitors: 6 in 2 sports
- Medals: Gold 0 Silver 0 Bronze 0 Total 0

Asian Para Games appearances (overview)
- 2010; 2014; 2018; 2022

Oman participated in the 2010 Asian Para Games–First Asian Para Games in Guangzhou, China from 13 to 19 December 2010. Athletes from Oman competed in two events.
