= Sri Lanka at the 2018 Asian Para Games =

- IPC code: SRI
- NPC: National Federation of Sports for the Disabled

in Jakarta 6–13 October 2018
- Competitors: 30 in 9 sports
- Flag bearer: Dinesh Priyantha
- Medals Ranked 14th: Gold 5 Silver 5 Bronze 5 Total 15

Asian Para Games appearances (overview)
- 2010; 2014; 2018; 2022

Sri Lanka took part in the 2018 Asian Para Games which was held in Jakarta from 6 to 13 October 2018, sent a delegation consisting of 30 para-athletes in 9 different sporting events. The 2016 Rio Paralympic medalist Dinesh Priyantha Herath was the skipper and the flagbearer for the contingent. Sri Lanka secured 5 medals on the opening day of the Asian Para Games.

Sri Lanka claimed 13 medals solely in the event of para-athletics during the competition including 4 gold medals and finished at 14th position out of 43 nations. Sri Lanka also secured all three medals across two tracks and field events during the competition, which was the first-ever instance in Sri Lankan sports history.

Sri Lankan skipper Dinesh Priyantha set a new Asian Para Games record in a javelin throw of 61.84m to secure a gold medal in the men's F46 javelin throw event. Amila Prashan also set a new Asian Para Games record by clocking with a timing of 12.56 seconds to clinch gold in the men's 100m T42/63 category. In July 2019, it is announced that Sri Lanka had a silver upgraded to gold and an extra bronze medal from medal reallocation due to a doping violation of an Uzbek athlete.

== Medalists ==
Medal	Name	Sport	Event	Date
Gold	Warnakulasooriya Amila Prasan	Athletics	Men's 200m T42/T63	08 Oct
Gold	Warnakulasooriya Amila Prasan	Athletics	Men's 100m T42/T63	09 Oct
Gold	Buddika Indrapala	Athletics	Men's Long Jump T42/T61/T63	10 Oct
Gold	Dinesh Priyantha	Athletics	Men's Javelin Throw F46	11 Oct
Gold	Amara Indumathi	Athletics	Women's Long Jump T45/46/47	08 Oct
Silver	Hetti Arachchige	Athletics	Men's Javelin Throw F42-44/61-64	08 Oct
Silver	Chuladasa Abarana	Athletics	Men's 200m T42/T63	08 Oct
Silver	Chuladasa Abarana	Athletics	Men's 100m T42/T63	09 Oct
Silver	Bandara Halgahawela	Athletics	Men's Shot Put F42/61/63	11 Oct
Silver	Indika Maththaka	Athletics	Men's Long Jump T44, T62/64	12 Oct
Bronze	Kumudu Priyanka	Athletics	Women's Long Jump T45/46/47	08 Oct
Bronze	Buddika Indrapala	Athletics	Men's 200m T42/T63	08 Oct
Bronze	Bandara Rathnahenakralalage	Athletics	Men's 100m T42/T63	09 Oct
Bronze	Pushpakumara Pattiwila	Athletics	Men's High Jump T44/64	10 Oct
Bronze	Lasantha Ranaweera; Suresh Dharmasena	Wheelchair tennis	Men's Doubles	11 Oct

== Medals by sport ==
Medals by sport
Sport	1st place, gold medalist(s)	2nd place, silver medalist(s)	3rd place, bronze medalist(s)	Total
Athletics	4	6	3	13
Wheelchair tennis	0	0	1	1
Total	4	6	4	14

== Medals by day ==
Medals by day
Day	Date	1st place, gold medalist(s)	2nd place, silver medalist(s)	3rd place, bronze medalist(s)	Total
1	October 7	0	0	0	0
2	October 8	1	3	1	5
3	October 9	1	1	1	3
4	October 10	1	0	1	2
5	October 11	1	1	1	3
6	October 12	0	1	0	1
7	October 13	0	0	0	0
Total		4	6	4	14

== See also ==
- Sri Lanka at the 2018 Asian Games
