= Bhutan at the 2022 Asian Para Games =

- IPC code: BHU
- NPC: Bhutan Paralympic Committee

in Hangzhou, Zhejiang, China 22–28 October 2023
- Competitors: 4 in 4 sports
- Medals: Gold 0 Silver 0 Bronze 0 Total 0

Asian Para Games appearances
- 2018; 2022

Bhutan competed at the 2022 Asian Para Games in Hangzhou, Zhejiang, China, from 22 to 28 October 2023. It was to take place in 2022 but due to COVID-19 pandemic cases rising in China the event has been postponed and rescheduled to October 2023.

This was the nation's second appearance at the Asian Para Games since the inception of the Bhutan Paralympic Committee in 2017.

The delegation had four athletes.

== Athletics ==
Chimi Dema will take part in shot put.

== Archery ==
Pema Rigsel competed in the recurve archery event.

== Badminton ==
Sapuna Subba is the sole badminton player for Bhutan.

== Shooting ==
Kinley Dem would be appearing for the second time for Bhutan after meeting the minimum qualifying score at the 2023 WSPS World Cup.

== See also ==
- Bhutan at the 2022 Asian Games
