= Syria at the 2018 Asian Para Games =

- IPC code: SYR
- NPC: Syrian Paralympic Committee

in Jakarta 6–13 October 2018
- Competitors: 9 in 2 sports
- Medals Ranked 30th: Gold 0 Silver 1 Bronze 4 Total 5

Asian Para Games appearances
- 2010; 2014; 2018; 2022

Syria participated at the 2018 Asian Para Games which was held in Jakarta, Indonesia from 6 to 13 October 2018. The team consists of 9 athletes who competed in 2 sports: 5 in athletics and 4 in powerlifting.

== Medalist ==
=== Medals by Sport ===
Medals by sport
Sport	1st place, gold medalist(s)	2nd place, silver medalist(s)	3rd place, bronze medalist(s)	Total
Athletics	0	0	3	3
Powerlifting	0	1	1	2
Total	0	1	4	5

=== Medalist ===
Medal	Name	Sport	Event
Silver	Fatema al-Hasan	Powerlifting	Women's 61kg
Bronze	Alaa Abdulsalam	Athletics	Men's Javelin Throw F53/54
Bronze	Alaa Abdulsalam	Athletics	Men's Shot Put 53
Bronze	Mohamad	Athletics	Men's Shot Put F56/57
Bronze	Noura Baddour	Powerlifting	Women's 41kg

== See also ==
- Syria at the 2018 Asian Games
