= North Korea at the 2018 Asian Para Games =

- IPC code: PRK
- NPC: Paralympic Committee of the Democratic People's Republic of Korea

in Jakarta 6–13 October 2018
- Competitors: 7 in 3 sports
- Medals: Gold 0 Silver 0 Bronze 0 Total 0

Asian Para Games appearances
- 2014; 2018; 2022

North Korea participated at the 2018 Asian Para Games which was held in Jakarta, Indonesia from 6 to 13 October 2018. The delegation consisted of seven athletes who participated in table tennis, swimming and para athletics.

== See also ==
- North Korea at the 2018 Asian Games
