= Pakistan at the 2018 Asian Para Games =

- IPC code: PAK
- NPC: National Paralympic Committee of Pakistan

in Jakarta 6–13 October 2018
- Competitors: 4 in 1 sport
- Medals Ranked 20th: Gold 2 Silver 0 Bronze 1 Total 3

Asian Para Games appearances (overview)
- 2010; 2014; 2018; 2022

Pakistan participated at the 2018 Asian Para Games which was held in Jakarta, Indonesia from 6 to 13 October 2018. The team consisted of 4 athletes competed in athletics in which all three medals of the team: 2 golds and 1 bronze were won by one of its athletes, Haider Ali in Discus Throw, Javelin Throw and long jump events respectively.

== Medalist ==
=== Medal by Sport ===
Medals by sport
Sport	1st place, gold medalist(s)	2nd place, silver medalist(s)	3rd place, bronze medalist(s)	Total
Athletics	2	0	1	3
Total	2	0	1	3

=== Medalist ===
Medal	Name	Sport	Event
Gold	Haider Ali	Athletics	Men's Discus Throw F37
Gold	Haider Ali	Athletics	Men's Javelin Throw F37/38
Bronze	Haider Ali	Athletics	Men's Long Jump T37/38

== See also ==
- Pakistan at the 2018 Asian Games
