= Turkmenistan at the 2018 Asian Para Games =

- IPC code: TKM
- NPC: National Paralympic Committee of Turkmenistan
- Medals Ranked 33rd: Gold 0 Silver 0 Bronze 1 Total 1

Asian Para Games appearances
- 2010; 2014; 2018; 2022

Turkmenistan competed at the 2018 Asian Para Games held in Jakarta, Indonesia from 6 to 13 October 2018. In total, athletes representing Turkmenistan won one bronze medal and the country finished in 33rd place in the medal table.

== Medalist ==
=== Medal by Sport ===
Medals by sport
Sport	1st place, gold medalist(s)	2nd place, silver medalist(s)	3rd place, bronze medalist(s)	Total
Powerlifting	0	0	1	1
Total	0	0	1	1

=== Medalist ===
Medal	Name	Sport	Event
Bronze	Sergey Meladze	Powerlifting	Men's 72kg

== Powerlifting ==
Sergey Meladze won the bronze medal in the men's 72 kg event.

== See also ==
- Turkmenistan at the 2018 Asian Games
