= Oman at the 2018 Asian Para Games =

- IPC code: OMA
- NPC: Oman Paralympic Committee

in Jakarta 06-13 October 2018
- Competitors: 9 in 1 sport
- Medals Ranked 23rd: Gold 1 Silver 3 Bronze 1 Total 5

Asian Para Games appearances (overview)
- 2010; 2014; 2018; 2022

Oman participated at the 2018 Asian Para Games which was held in Jakarta, Indonesia from 6 to 13 October 2018. Mansoor al Touqi, president of the Oman Paralympic Committee, was the chef-de-mission of the delegation. All its 9 athletes which consists of 5 men and 4 women participated in athletics. The team also consists of coaches, a physical therapist, and officials.

== Medalists ==
Medal	Name	Sport	Event	Date
Gold	Mohammed Jamil Taaeeb	Athletics	Men's Shot Put F32	12 Oct
Silver	Mohammed Jamil Taaeeb	Athletics	Men's Club Throw F32	08 Oct
Silver	Abdullah Rashid	Athletics	Men's 400m T36	10 Oct
Silver	Mohammed Harthi	Athletics	Men's Shot Put F32	12 Oct
Bronze	Abdullah Rashid	Athletics	Men's 100m T36	09 Oct

== Medals by sport ==
Medals by sport
Sport	1st place, gold medalist(s)	2nd place, silver medalist(s)	3rd place, bronze medalist(s)	Total
Athletics	1	3	1	5
Total	1	3	1	5

== Medals by day ==
Medals by day
Day	Date	1st place, gold medalist(s)	2nd place, silver medalist(s)	3rd place, bronze medalist(s)	Total
1	October 7	0	0	0	0
2	October 8	0	1	0	1
3	October 9	0	0	1	1
4	October 10	0	1	0	1
5	October 11	0	0	0	0
6	October 12	1	1	0	2
7	October 13	0	0	0	0
Total		1	3	1	5

== See also ==
- Oman at the 2018 Asian Games
