= Mongolia at the 2018 Asian Para Games =

- IPC code: MGL
- NPC: Mongolian Paralympic Committee

in Jakarta 6–13 October 2018
- Competitors: 40 in 9 sports
- Medals Ranked 25th: Gold 1 Silver 1 Bronze 3 Total 5

Asian Para Games appearances
- 2010; 2014; 2018; 2022

Mongolia participated at the 2018 Asian Para Games which was held in Jakarta, Indonesia from 6 to 13 October 2018. The Mongolian delegation was composed of 40 athletes who participate in 9 sports.

== Medalist ==
=== Medals by Sport ===
Medals by sport
Sport	1st place, gold medalist(s)	2nd place, silver medalist(s)	3rd place, bronze medalist(s)	Total
Athletics	0	1	0	1
Judo	0	0	3	3
Powerlifting	1	0	0	1
Total	1	1	3	5

=== Medalist ===
Medal	Name	Sport	Event
Gold	Sodnompiljee Enkhbayar	Powerlifting	Men's 107kg
Silver	Erdenechimeg Unurmaa	Athletics	Women's Shot Put F40/41
Bronze	Aajim Munkhbat	Judo	Men's 66kg
Bronze	Demchigdorj Erdenebayar	Judo	Men's 90kg
Bronze	Nyamaa Altantsetseg	Judo	Women's +70kg

== See also ==
- Mongolia at the 2018 Asian Games
