= Saudi Arabia at the 2018 Asian Para Games =

- IPC code: KSA
- NPC: Paralympic Committee of Saudi Arabia

in Jakarta 6–13 October 2018
- Competitors: 27 in 3 sports
- Medals Ranked 19th: Gold 2 Silver 3 Bronze 3 Total 8

Asian Para Games appearances
- 2010; 2014; 2018; 2022

Saudi Arabia participated at the 2018 Asian Para Games which was held in Jakarta, Indonesia from 6 to 13 October 2018. Saudi Arabian delegation was composed of 27 athletes who competed in 3 sports, namely athletics, powerlifting and wheelchair basketball. All its medals were won in the sport of athletics.

== Medalist ==
=== Medal by Sport ===
Medals by sport
Sport	1st place, gold medalist(s)	2nd place, silver medalist(s)	3rd place, bronze medalist(s)	Total
Athletics	2	3	3	8
Total	2	3	3	8

=== Medalist ===
Medal	Name	Sport	Event
Gold	Adawi Ahmed	Athletics	Men's 200m T35
Gold	Nour al-Sana	Athletics	Men's 400m T44/62/64
Silver	Ahmed Adawi	Athletics	Men's 100m T35
Silver	Nour al-Sana	Athletics	Men's 200m T44/62/64
Silver	Hani Alnakhli	Athletics	Men's Shot Put F33
Bronze	Ali al-Nakhli	Athletics	Men's 100m T37
Bronze	Fahad al-Ganaidl	Athletics	Men's 100m T53
Bronze	Radhi al-Harthi	Athletics	Men's Club Throw F51

== See also ==
- Saudi Arabia at the 2018 Asian Games
