= Bhutan Paralympic Committee =

National Paralympic Committee of Bhutan

National Paralympic Committee
- Country: Bhutan
- Code: BHU
- Created: September 2017
- Recognized: 2017
- Continental association: APC
- Headquarters: Changlimithang Stadium, Thimphu, Bhutan
- President: HRH Princess; Euphelma Choden Wangchuck
- Secretary General: Sonam Karma Tshering

The Bhutan Paralympic Committee (Dzongkha: འབྲུག་པེ་ར་ལིམ་ཕིག་ཚོགས་པ།, romanized: 'brug pe ra lim phig tshogs pa), also known as NPC Bhutan, is the national sports body for disabled athletes in Bhutan. Established in 2017, NPC Bhutan is among the youngest National Paralympic Committees in the world and is a member of the Asian Paralympic Committee and the International Paralympic Committee.

== History ==
Efforts to establish a national Paralympic Committee were made as early as 2016, in a bid to make the participation of Bhutanese athletes in the 2020 Summer Paralympics possible. On 17 September 2016, the Bhutan Olympic Committee and Japanese firm, SEISA Group signed a memorandum of understanding for cooperation to help qualify athletes in the 2020 games and establish a Paralympic committee. On September of the following year, the Bhutan Paralympic Committee was established and on the same year the organization joined the Asian Paralympic Committee and the International Paralympic Committee.

NPC Bhutan became a member of the Bhutan Olympic Committee in February 2018.

Bhutan made its debut at the Asian Para Games in the 2018 edition hosted in Jakarta, Indonesia with two athletes, an archer and a shooter.
