= United Arab Emirates at the 2018 Asian Para Games =

- IPC code: UAE
- NPC: UAE Paralympic Committee

in Jakarta 6–13 October 2018
- Competitors: 42 in 8 sports
- Medals Ranked 18th: Gold 2 Silver 6 Bronze 3 Total 11

Asian Para Games appearances
- 2010; 2014; 2018; 2022

United Arab Emirates participated at the 2018 Asian Para Games which was held in Jakarta, Indonesia from 6 to 13 October 2018. The Emirati delegation was composed of 42 athletes who competed in eight sports, namely: athletics, powerlifting, shooting, boccia, cycling, table tennis, archery and judo.

== Medalists ==
Medal	Name	Sport	Event	Date
Gold	Mohamed Hammadi	Athletics	Men's 800m T33/34	08 Oct
Gold	Abdullah Sultan al-Aryani	Shooting	Men's 50M Rifle 3 Position - SH1	12 Oct
Silver	Rashed al-Dhaheri	Cycling	Men's Time Trial (H4-5)	08 Oct
Silver	Abdullah Sultan al-Aryani	Shooting	Men's 10M Air Rifle Standing - SH1	08 Oct
Silver	Mohamed Hammadi	Athletics	Men's 100m T34	09 Oct
Silver	Rashed al-Dhaheri	Cycling	Men's Road Race (H4-5)	09 Oct
Silver	Mohamed Hammadi	Athletics	Men's Shot Put F36	10 Oct
Silver	Mohammed Khamis Khalaf	Powerlifting	Men's 97 kg	12 Oct
Bronze	Maryam	Athletics	Women's Javelin Throw F46	08 Oct
Bronze	Sara Al Senaani	Athletics	Women's Shot Put F33	09 Oct
Bronze	Haifa al-Naqbi	Powerlifting	Women's 73 kg	10 Oct

== Medals by sport ==
Medals by sport
Sport	1st place, gold medalist(s)	2nd place, silver medalist(s)	3rd place, bronze medalist(s)	Total
Athletics	1	2	2	5
Cycling	0	2	0	2
Powerlifting	0	1	1	2
Shooting	1	1	0	2
Total	2	6	3	11

== Medals by day ==
Medals by day
Day	Date	1st place, gold medalist(s)	2nd place, silver medalist(s)	3rd place, bronze medalist(s)	Total
1	October 7	0	0	0	0
2	October 8	1	2	1	4
3	October 9	0	2	1	3
4	October 10	0	1	1	2
5	October 11	0	0	0	0
6	October 12	1	1	0	2
7	October 13	0	0	0	0
Total		2	6	3	11

== See also ==
- United Arab Emirates at the 2018 Asian Games
