= Kuwait at the 2018 Asian Para Games =

- IPC code: KUW
- NPC: Kuwait Paralympic Committee

in Jakarta 6–13 October 2018
- Competitors: 23 in 4 sports
- Medals Ranked 22nd: Gold 1 Silver 3 Bronze 4 Total 8

Asian Para Games appearances
- 2010; 2014; 2018; 2022

Kuwait participated at the 2018 Asian Para Games which was held in Jakarta, Indonesia from 6 to 13 October 2018. The Kuwaiti delegation was composed of 23 athletes who competed in four sports, namely: table tennis, fencing, shooting para sports, and para athletics. Secretary of Kuwait Disabled Club Saad Al-Azmaa was the head of the delegation.

== Medalists ==
Medal	Name	Sport	Event	Date
Gold	Ahmad al-Mutairi	Athletics	Men's 100m T33	09 Oct
Silver	Ahmad al-Mutairi	Athletics	Men's 800m T33/34	08 Oct
Silver	Dhari Buti	Athletics	Men's Shot Put F37	08 Oct
Silver	Hamed Latif	Table tennis	Men's Singles- TT 1	08 Oct
Bronze	Mohammad Nasser	Athletics	Men's Club Throw F32	08 Oct
Bronze	Hamed Ali	Athletics	Men's Shot Put F37	08 Oct
Bronze	Hamed Ali	Athletics	Men's Discus Throw F37	10 Oct
Bronze	Najim Basimah	Athletics	Women's Shot Put F34	12 Oct

== Medals by sport ==
Medals by sport
Sport	1st place, gold medalist(s)	2nd place, silver medalist(s)	3rd place, bronze medalist(s)	Total
Athletics	1	2	4	7
Table tennis	0	1	0	1
Total	1	3	4	8

== Medals by day ==
Medals by day
Day	Date	1st place, gold medalist(s)	2nd place, silver medalist(s)	3rd place, bronze medalist(s)	Total
1	October 7	0	0	0	0
2	October 8	0	3	2	5
3	October 9	1	0	0	1
4	October 10	0	0	1	1
5	October 11	0	0	0	0
6	October 12	0	0	1	1
7	October 13	0	0	0	0
Total		1	3	4	8

== See also ==
- Kuwait at the 2018 Asian Games
