= Athletics at the 2018 Asian Para Games =

Paralympic athletics at the 2018 Asian Para Games
- Venue: Gelora Bung Karno Stadium
- Location: Jakarta, Indonesia
- Dates: 8–12 October

Paralympic athletics at the 2018 Asian Para Games was held in Jakarta between 8 and 12 October 2018.

== Medal table ==
Medal for women’s Long Jump T45/46/47 were revised due to doping violation.

* Host nation (Indonesia)

Rank	NPC	Gold	Silver	Bronze	Total
1	China (CHN)	56	32	16	104
2	Iran (IRI)	27	26	28	81
3	Japan (JPN)	13	24	14	51
4	Uzbekistan (UZB)	13	6	7	26
5	Thailand (THA)	11	10	13	34
6	Malaysia (MAS)	8	4	2	14
7	India (IND)	7	13	16	36
8	Indonesia (INA)*	6	12	10	28
9	Sri Lanka (SRI)	5	5	5	15
10	Iraq (IRQ)	3	2	2	7
11	Saudi Arabia (KSA)	2	3	3	8
12	South Korea (KOR)	2	3	1	6
13	Pakistan (PAK)	2	0	1	3
14	Timor-Leste (TLS)	2	0	0	2
15	Oman (OMA)	1	3	1	5
16	Kuwait (KUW)	1	2	4	7
17	United Arab Emirates (UAE)	1	2	2	5
18	Jordan (JOR)	1	1	0	2
19	Bahrain (BRN)	0	2	1	3
20	Vietnam (VIE)	0	1	7	8
21	Chinese Taipei (TPE)	0	1	4	5
22	Kazakhstan (KAZ)	0	1	2	3
23	Hong Kong (HKG)	0	1	1	2
24	Mongolia (MGL)	0	1	0	1
24	Qatar (QAT)	0	1	0	1
26	Syria (SYR)	0	0	3	3
Totals (26 entries)		161	156	143	460

== Medalists ==
Athletes listed in pink were classified but no medal were awarded due to limited number of contestants in the event.

=== Men ===
Event	Class	Gold		Silver		Bronze	
100 m	T11	Peerapon Watbok; Thailand	11.44 GR	Abdul Halim Dalimunte; Indonesia	11.52	Di Dongdong; China	11.59
100 m	T12	Mansor Abdirashidov; Uzbekistan	11.26 GR	Shunya Yamaji; Japan	11.29	Faizal Aideal; Malaysia	11.40
100 m	T13	Doniyorjon Akhmedov; Uzbekistan	11.26	Songwut Lamsan; Thailand	11.32	Omid Zarifsanayei; Iran	11.49
100 m	T33	Ahmad al-Mutairi; Kuwait	21.30	Jiang Shun; China	22.33	—	
100 m	T34	Chaiwat Rattana; Thailand	16.25	Mohamed Hammadi; United Arab Emirates	16.47	Atsuro Kobata; Japan	16.90
100 m	T35	Narayan Thakur; India	14.02 GR	Ahmed Adawi; Saudi Arabia	14.40	Bao Chui Yiu; Hong Kong	14.62
100 m	T36	Ridzuan Puzi; Malaysia	11.87 WR	Yang Yifei; China	11.91	Abdullah Rashid; Oman	12.36
100 m	T37	Saptoyoga Purnomo; Indonesia	11.49 AR	Davoudali Ghasemi; Iran	11.97	Ali al-Nakhli; Saudi Arabia	12.01
100 m	T38	Zhu Dening; China	11.33 GR	Abbas al-Darraji; Iraq	11.90	Zhong Huanghao; China	11.93
100 m	T42/63	Prasan Warnakulasooriya; Sri Lanka	12.56	Chuladasa Abarana; Sri Lanka	12.87	Bandara Rathnahenakralalage; Sri Lanka	12.92
100 m	T44/62/64	Shunsuke Itani; Japan	11.75 AR	Keita Sato; Japan	11.82	Denpoom Kotcharang; Thailand	11.87
100 m	T45/46/47	Wang Hao; China	10.80 AR	Nur Ferry Pradana; Indonesia	11.06	Ahmad Ojaghlou; Iran	11.08
100 m	T51/52	Tatsuya Ito; Japan	18.06 AR	Tomoya Ito; Japan	18.37	Jeong Jong-dae; South Korea	18.91
100 m	T53	Pongsakorn Paeyo; Thailand	14.80 GR	Yoo Byung-hoon; South Korea	15.57	Fahad al-Ganaidl; Saudi Arabia	15.65
100 m	T54	Liu Yang; China	14.22	Hu Yang; China	14.41	Saichon Konjen; Thailand	14.81
200 m	T11	Di Dongdong; China	23.33 GR	Peerapon Watbok; Thailand	23.85	Abdul Halim Dalimunte; Indonesia	24.22
200 m	T12	Vahid Alinajimi; Iran	22.60 GR	Eko Saputra; Indonesia	23.17	Phạm Nguyễn Khánh Minh; Vietnam	23.18
200 m	T13	Doniyorjon Akhmedov; Uzbekistan	22.79	Songwut Lamsan; Thailand	23.01	Omid Zarifsanayei; Iran	23.05
200 m	T35	Adawi Ahmed; Saudi Arabia	30.39 GR	Bao Chui Yiu; Hong Kong	30.59	—	
200 m	T37	Saptoyoga Purnomo; Indonesia	23.76	Ali Olfatnia; Iran	24.27	Davoudali Ghasemi; Iran	24.38
200 m	T38	Zhu Dening; China	22.71 GR	Abbas al-Darraji; Iraq	24.04	Zhong Huanghao; China	24.47
200 m	T42/T63	Prasan Warnakulasooriya; Sri Lanka	26.01	Chuladasa Abarana; Sri Lanka	26.08	Buddika Indrapala; Sri Lanka	26.59
200 m	T44/62/64	Keita Sato; Japan	23.87	Nour al-Sana; Saudi Arabia	24.10	Anandan Gunasekaran; India	24.45
200 m	T45/46/47	Wang Hao; China	21.71 AR	Rizal Bagus Saktiyono; Indonesia	22.36	Ahmad Ojaghlou; Iran	22.53
200 m	T51/52	Tomoya Ito; Japan	33.17	Jeong Jong-dae; South Korea	33.73	Peth Rungsri; Thailand	34.78
200 m	T53	Pongsakorn Paeyo; Thailand	27.59	Pichet Krungget; Thailand	28.07	Yang Shaoqiao; China	28.69
200 m	T54	Liu Yang; China	25.66	Jaenal Aripin; Indonesia	26.21	Zhang Yong; China	26.32
400 m	T11	Di Dongdong; China	53.15 GR	Miran Sakhatov; Uzbekistan	54.77	Nguyễn Ngọc Hiệp; Vietnam	59.69
400 m	T12	Vahid Alinajimi; Iran	49.98	Phạm Nguyễn Khánh Minh; Vietnam	50.94	Eko Saputra; Indonesia	53.16
400 m	T13	Omid Zarifsanayei; Iran	51.41	Songwut Lamsan; Thailand	52.00	Avnil Kumar; India	52.00
400 m	T20	Nasharuddin; Malaysia	49.32 AR	Felipus Kolymau; Indonesia	50.28	Endi Nurdin Tine; Indonesia	50.62
400 m	T36	Ridzuan Puzi; Malaysia	59.36	Abdullah Rashid; Oman	59.75	Farhad Kahrizi; Iran	1:00.39
400 m	T37	Teofilo Freitas; Timor-Leste	53.14 AR	Hashem Rastegari Mobin; Iran	53.54	Davoudali Ghasemi; Iran	56.10
400 m	T38	Abbas al-Darraji; Iraq	53.22	Zhong Huanghao; China	54.99	Surasak Damchoom; Thailand	56.53
400 m	T44/62/64	Nour al-Sana; Saudi Arabia	53.00	Anandan Gunasekaran; India	53.72	Vinay Kumar Lal; India	54.45
400 m	T45/46/47	Wang Hao; China	48.64 AR	Nur Ferry Pradana; Indonesia	49.86	Sandeep Singh Maan; India	50.07
400 m	T52	Tomoki Sato; Japan	1:01.49	Tomoya Ito; Japan	1:04.02	Peth Rungsri; Thailand	1:05.35
400 m	T53	Pongsakorn Paeyo; Thailand	50.29	Pichet Krungget; Thailand	51.13	Yang Shaoqiao; China	52.45
400 m	T54	Zhang Yong; China	47.95	Liu Yang; China	48.88	Putharet Khongrak; Thailand	49.34
800 m	T33/34	Mohamed Hammadi; United Arab Emirates	2:00.28	Ahmad al-Mutairi; Kuwait	2:03.94	Atsuro Kobata; Japan	2:04.02
800 m	T51/52	Tomoki Sato; Japan	2:06.71 GR	Hirokazu Ueyonabaru; Japan	2:16.77	Jerrold Mangliwan; Philippines	2:18.04
800 m	T53	Pongsakorn Paeyo; Thailand	1:43.61	Yoo Byung-hoon; South Korea	1:43.77	Yang Shaoqiao; China	1:43.88
800 m	T54	Zhang Yong; China	1:38.30	Saichon Konjen; Thailand	1:38.44	Putharet Khongrak; Thailand	1:39.44
1500 m	T11	Hamid Eslami; Iran	4:18.18	Shinya Wada; Japan	4:22.87	Kenya Karasawa; Japan	4:23.24
1500 m	T12/13	Fakhriddin Khamraev; Uzbekistan	4:08.46	Nabeel Maqableh; Jordan	4:09.59	Tadashi Horikoshi; Japan	4:11.21
1500 m	T20	Peyman Nasiri Bazanjani; Iran	4:07.10	Daiki Akai; Japan	4:09.19	Yuji Togawa; Japan	4:09.55
1500 m	T37/38	Teofilo Freitas; Timor-Leste	4:32.74 AR	Surasak Damchoom; Thailand	4:50.59	Ali Rsaitmawi; Iraq	4:51.11
1500 m	T45/46	Marufjon Murodulloev; Uzbekistan	4:13.99	Ashraf Haisham; Malaysia	4:17.02	Amin Abdolpour; Iran	4:19.44
1500 m	T53/54	Prawat Wahoram; Thailand	3:14.54	Putharet Khongrak; Thailand	3:14.65	Rawat Tana; Thailand	3:14.88
5000 m	T11	Kenya Karasawa; Japan	16:17.65 GR	Shinya Wada; Japan	16:19.02	Masahiro Taniguchi; Japan	16:52.28
5000 m	T12/13	Tadashi Horikoshi; Japan	16:05.09 AR	Fakhriddin Khamraev; Uzbekistan	16:19.48	Mikaeil Dayani; Iran	16:19.96
5000 m	T53/54	Prawat Wahoram; Thailand	11:13.06	Zhang Yong; China	11:13.20	Jin Hua; China	11:13.60
High jump	T45/46/47	Angkarn Chanaboon; Thailand	2.01 AR	Chen Hongjie; China	1.94	—	
High jump	T45/46/47	Angkarn Chanaboon; Thailand	2.01 AR	Rampal Chahar; India	1.94	—	
High jump	T42/63	Sharad Kumar; India	1.90	Varun Bhati; India	1.82	Mariyappan Thangavelu; India	1.67
High jump	T44/64	Temurbek Giyazov; Uzbekistan	1.95	Toru Suzuki; Japan	1.89	Pushpakumara Pattiwila; Sri Lanka	1.76
Long jump	T11	Di Dongdong; China	6.55	Chen Xingyu; China	6.36	Yang Chuan-hui; Chinese Taipei	5.90
Long jump	T12	Doniyor Saliev; Uzbekistan	7.22 =AR	Wong Kar Gee; Malaysia	7.05	Amir Khosravani; Iran	7.01
Long jump	T20	Abdul Latif Romly; Malaysia	7.64 WR	Kanta Kokubo; Japan	6.79	Mitsuo Yamaguchi; Japan	6.68
Long jump	T36	Ridzuan Puzi; Malaysia	5.49 AR	Izzat Turgunov; Uzbekistan	5.27	Sergey Kharlamov; Kazakhstan	4.62
Long jump	T37/38	Zhu Dening; China	6.85 GR	Zhong Huanghao; China	6.57	Haider Ali; Pakistan	6.20
Long jump	T45/46/47	Wang Hao; China	7.53 AR	Setyo Budi Hartanto; Indonesia	7.10	Hajimu Ashida; Japan	6.88
Long jump	T42/61/63	Buddika Indrapala; Sri Lanka	5.37	Vijay Kumar; India	5.05	Mulyono; Indonesia	4.89
Long jump	T44/62/64	Eddy Bernard; Malaysia	6.30	Indika Maththaka; Sri Lanka	6.09	Rasyidi; Indonesia	6.05
Club throw	F32	Younes Seifipour; Iran	30.16 AR	Mohammed Jamil Taaeeb; Oman	29.11	Mohammad Nasser; Kuwait	24.76
Club throw	F51	Amit Kumar Saroha; India	29.47 GR	Dharambir Nain; India	24.81	Radhi al-Harthi; Saudi Arabia	21.63
Discus throw	F11	Mahdi Olad; Iran	42.37 AR	Monu Ghangas; India	35.89	Arian Lotfi; Iran	34.14
Discus throw	F12	Saman Pakbaz; Iran	51.06 GR	Masoud Heidari; Iran	48.65	Elbek Sultonov; Uzbekistan	39.39
Discus throw	F37	Haider Ali; Pakistan	47.68	Li Cuiqing; China	46.27	Hamed Ali; Kuwait	41.79
Discus throw	F43/44/62/64	Farzad Sepahvand; Iran	54.61	Pardeep; India	46.64	Aneesh Kumar Pillai; India	45.41
Discus throw	F46	Hou Zhanbiao; China	47.73	Wei Enlong; China	47.19	Sundar Singh Gurjar; India	47.10
Discus throw	F51/52/53	Hossein Khorsandamiri; Iran	23.74 GR	Asadollah Azimi; Iran	23.42	Alireza Mokhtari; Iran	19.69
Discus throw	F54/55/56	Alireza Ghaleh Nasseri; Iran	44.75	Jalil Bagheri Jeddi; Iran	37.14	Hamed Amiri; Iran	30.12
Discus throw	F57	Wu Guoshan; China	47.77 AR	Javid Ehsani Shakib; Iran	44.10	Alan Sastra Ginting; Indonesia	42.83
Javelin throw	F12/13	Aleksandr Svechnikov; Uzbekistan	67.92 GR	Behzad Azizi; Iran	65.62	Seyed Erfan Hosseini; Iran	58.17
Javelin throw	F33/34	Mehdi Alizadeh; Iran	20.96 GR	Mohsen Kaedi; Iran	31.72	Wang Yanzhang; China	31.69
Javelin throw	F37/38	Haider Ali; Pakistan	48.83 GR	Hormoz Seidi Kazpounji; Iran	48.28	Javad Hardani; Iran	45.61
Javelin throw	F40/41	Ahmed Naas; Iraq	38.57	Sun Pengxiang; China	43.26	Trần Văn Nguyên; Vietnam	32.79
Javelin throw	F46	Dinesh Priyantha; Sri Lanka	61.84 GR	Sundar Singh Gurjar; India	61.33	Rinku; India	60.92
Javelin throw	F53/54	Hamed Amiri; Iran	28.12 AR	Abdolreza Jokar; Iran	19.62	Alaa Abdulsalam; Syria	19.22
Javelin throw	F55	Neeraj Yadav; India	29.84 GR	Amit Balyan; India	29.79	Kiều Minh Trung; Vietnam	28.27
Javelin throw	F56/57	Mohammad Alvanpour; Iran	39.22 AR	Amanolah Papi; Iran	48.60 WR	Mohammad Khalvandi; Iran	48.01
Javelin throw	F42–44/61–64	Sandeep Chaudhary; India	60.01 WR	Hetti Arachchige; Sri Lanka	59.32	Ali Omidi; Iran	58.97
Shot put	F11	Mahdi Olad; Iran	14.00 AR	Nourmohammad Arekhi; Iran	12.64	Monu Ghangas; India	11.38
Shot put	F12	Elbek Sultonov; Uzbekistan	15.67 GR	Saman Pakbaz; Iran	15.19	Masoud Heidari; Iran	14.47
Shot put	F20	Muhammad Ziyad Zolkefli; Malaysia	16.94 GR	Mohamad Aliff Mohamad Awi; Malaysia	13.09	Boonkong Sanepoot; Thailand	13.01
Shot put	F32	Mohammed Jamil Taaeeb; Oman	8.42	Mohammed Harthi; Oman	7.26	Younes Seifipour; Iran	6.98
Shot put	F33	Mohammadreza Ahmadi; Iran	9.92 AR	Hani Alnakhli; Saudi Arabia	9.37	Mehdi Alizadeh; Iran	9.34
Shot put	F34	Ahmad Hindi; Jordan	12.07 WR	Siamak Saleh-Farajzadeh; Iran	11.44	Wang Yanzhang; China	111.13
Shot put	F35	Khusniddin Norbekov; Uzbekistan	16.35 WR	Seyed Javanmardi; Iran	15.45	Fu Xinhan; China	15.21
Shot put	F36	Aref Baharvand; Iran	12.57 GR	Mohammed al-Kaabi; United Arab Emirates	12.40	Ivan Zaleznyak; Kazakhstan	11.69
Shot put	F37	Li Cuiqing; China	13.05	Dhari Buti; Kuwait	12.50	Hamed Ali; Kuwait	11.61
Shot put	F40	Garrah Tnaiash; Iraq	10.88 WR	Chen Zhenyu; China	9.84	Trần Văn Nguyên; Vietnam	9.35
Shot put	F41	Bobirjon Omonov; Uzbekistan	12.31	Xia Zhiwei; China	11.55	Kovan Abdulraheem; Iraq	11.53
Shot put	F42/61/63	Sajad Mohammadian; Iran	15.27 AR	Bandara Halgahawela; Sri Lanka	13.21	Mukhammad Rikhsimov; Uzbekistan	13.12
Shot put	F46	Wei Enlong; China	15.67 GR	Ravil Mansurbayev; Kazakhstan	14.66	Yasser Mohd; India	14.22
Shot put	F53	Alireza Mokhtari; Iran	8.73 AR	Asadollah Azimi; Iran	8.35	Alaa Abdulsalam; Syria	7.46
Shot put	F54/55	Hamed Amiri; Iran	11.32 GR	Jalil Bagheri Jeddi; Iran	10.67	Tek Chand; India	8.85
Shot put	F56/57	Wu Guoshan; China	14.39 GR	Virender; India	14.23	Mohamad; Syria	13.89
WR world record | AR area record | CR championship record | GR games record | NR national record | OR Olympic record | PB personal best | SB season best | WL world leading (in a given season)

=== Women ===
Event	Class	Gold		Silver		Bronze	
100 m	T11	Liu Cuiqing; China	12.07 GR	Zhou Guohua; China	12.10	Kewalin Wannaruemon; Thailand	12.91
100 m	T12	Uran Sawada; Japan	12.97	Suneeporn Tanomwong; Thailand	13.20	Hagar Safarzadeh Ghahderijani; Iran	13.68
100 m	T13	Putri Aulia; Indonesia	12.49 GR	Ni Made Arianti Putri; Indonesia	13.00	Endang Sari Sitorus; Indonesia	13.07
100 m	T33/34 (non-medal event)	Atsuko Kanawaku; Japan	20.51	Haruka Kitaura; Japan	22.57	—	
100 m	T35	Zhou Xia; China	14.77 GR	Madoka Sakurai; Japan	20.49	—	
100 m	T36	Jeon Min-jae; South Korea	14.98	Yu Chun Lai; Hong Kong	16.28	Wang Dan; China	16.46
100 m	T37	Wen Xiaoyan; China	13.50 AR	Jiang Fenfen; China	13.58	Sabina Sukhanova; Uzbekistan	13.65
100 m	T38 (non-medal event)	Yuka Takamatsu; Japan	14.02	Ayumi Takemura; Japan	14.34	—	
100 m	T42/63	Karisma Evi Tiarani; Indonesia	14.98 AR	Kaede Maegawa; Japan	16.89	Tomomi Tozawa; Japan	16.98
100 m	T44/62/64 (non-medal event)	Saki Takakuwa; Japan	13.60	Maya Nakanishi; Japan	14.48	—	
100 m	T45/46/47	Li Lu; China	12.57 GR	Wang Yanping; China	13.07	Sae Tsuji; Japan	13.10
100 m	T52	Teruyo Tanaka; Japan	23.71	Yuka Kiyama; Japan	23.71	Norsilawati Sa'at; Singapore	29.40
100 m	T53	Zhou Hongzhuan; China	17.01	Keiko Konishi; Japan	18.56	Pranaya Sekratok; Thailand	20.36
100 m	T54	Zhou Zhaoqian; China	16.69	Kayo Nakamura; Japan	17.78	Chen Yu-lien; Chinese Taipei	18.77
200 m	T11	Liu Cuiqing; China	24.67 AR	Zhou Guohua; China	25.52	Kewalin Wannaruemon; Thailand	27.11
200 m	T12	Suneeporn Tanomwong; Thailand	27.84	Hagar Safarzadeh Ghahderijani; Iran	27.94	—	
200 m	T35 (non-medal event)	Zhou Xia; China	29.17 GR	—		—	
200 m	T36	Jeon Min-jae; South Korea	31.08 GR	Wang Dan; China	33.57	Yam Kwok Fan; Hong Kong	34.50
200 m	T37	Jiang Fenfen; China	28.25 AR	Wen Xiaoyan; China	28.95	Sabina Sukhanova; Uzbekistan	29.04
200 m	T45/46/47	Li Lu; China	25.82 GR	Wang Yanping; China	26.45	Jayanti Behera; India	27.45
200 m	T53	Zhou Hongzhuan; China	33.68	Keiko Konishi; Japan	34.64	Pranaya Sekratok; Thailand	35.80
200 m	T54	Zhou Zhaoqian; China	30.54	Kayo Nakamura; Japan	32.87	Chen Yu-lien; Chinese Taipei	34.32
400 m	T11	Liu Cuiqing; China	58.31	Zhou Guohua; China	1:01.80	Kewalin Wannaruemon; Thailand	1:05.34
400 m	T12	Suneeporn Tanomwong; Thailand	1:03.38	Hagar Safarzadeh Ghahderijani; Iran	1:06.80	Radha Venkatesh; India	1:07.03
400 m	T13	Mana Sasaki; Japan	1:01.48 GR	Ni Made Arianti Putri; Indonesia	1:05.29	Ozra Mahdavikiya; Iran	1:08.18
400 m	T20	Siti Noor Iasah Mohamad Ariffin; Malaysia	58.69 GR	Aimi Toyama; Japan	1:00.78	Elvin Elhudia Sesa; Indonesia	1:01.37
400 m	T37	Jiang Fenfen; China	1:04.53 GR	Wen Xiaoyan; China	1:07.04	Sabina Sukhanova; Uzbekistan	1:09.71
400 m	T38 (non-medal event)	Yuka Takamatsu; Japan	1:05.15	Ayumi Takemura; Japan	1:05.86	Manami Kinoshita; Japan	1:10.40
400 m	T45/46/47	Li Lu; China	58.34 GR	Jayanti Behera; India	59.71	Sae Tsuji; Japan	59.74
400 m	T53	Zhou Hongzhuan; China	1:00.29	Kazumi Nakayama; Japan	1:05.64	Pranaya Sekratok; Thailand	1:07.05
400 m	T54	Zou Lihong; China	56.94	Zhou Zhaoqian; China	57.34	Kayo Nakamura; Japan	1:05.14
800 m	T53	Zhou Hongzhuan; China	2:01.39	Kazumi Nakayama; Japan	2:07.68	Pranaya Sekratok; Thailand	2:17.69
800 m	T54 (non-medal event)	Zou Lihong; China	1:55.35 GR	Chainet Srithong; Thailand	2:13.57	—	
1500 m	T11	Rakshitha Raju; India	5:40.64	Natsumi Inouchi; Japan	5:48.13	—	
1500 m	T12/13	Ozra Mahdavikiya; Iran	5:16.65 AR	Radha Venkatesh; India	5:17.65	Mitsuyo Matsumoto; Japan	5:17.98
1500 m	T20	Sayaka Makita; Japan	4:53.26 GR	Moeko Yamamoto; Japan	5:02.30	Misaki Ari; Japan	5:15.97
1500 m	T53/54	Zou Lihong; China	3:43.83	Kazumi Nakayama; Japan	4:10.69	Chainet Srithong; Thailand	4:10.99
Long jump	T11/12	Zhou Guohua; China	4.77 GR	Chiaki Takada; Japan	4.48	Asila Mirzayorova; Uzbekistan	4.47
Long jump	T20	Oktavia Rica; Indonesia	5.25 AR	Siti Noor Radiah Ismail; Malaysia	5.18	Sonomi Sakai; Japan	5.02
Long jump	T37/38	Wen Xiaoyan; China	4.65	Sabina Sukhanova; Uzbekistan	4.30	Manami Kinoshita; Japan	4.14
Long jump	T42–44/61–64	Maya Nakanishi; Japan	5.44 GR	Karisma Evi Tiarani; Indonesia	4.03	Saki Takakuwa; Japan	4.85
Long jump	T45/46/47	Amara Indumathi; Sri Lanka	4.62	Zahra Bornaki; Iran	4.51	Kumudu Priyanka; Sri Lanka	4.41
Club throw	F32/51	Ekta Bhyan; India	16.02 GR	Thekra al-Kaabi; United Arab Emirates	15.75	—	
Discus throw	F11	Zhang Liangmin; China	36.52	Tang Hongxia; China	33.98	Nidhi Mishra; India	21.82
Discus throw	F12	Zhao Yuping; China	42.89 GR	Sofiya Burkhanova; Uzbekistan	38.42	Liu Ya-ting; Chinese Taipei	33.79
Discus throw	F37/38	Mi Na; China	36.99 GR	Li Yingli; China	31.60	Umi Syuhadah Idris; Malaysia	23.20
Discus throw	F40/41	Zhang Fengju; China	19.74	Li Wei; China	26.12 AR	Zhila Yousefi; Iran	16.22
Discus throw	F43/44/62/64	Yao Juan; China	39.01	Yang Yue; China	36.95	Solmaz Bazargan; Iran	27.94
Discus throw	F51/52/53	Elnaz Darabian Aghdas; Iran	10.71 AR	Fatema Nedham; Bahrain	9.87	Deepa Malik; India	9.67
Discus throw	F54/55	Yang Liwan; China	18.25 GR	Dong Feixia; China	23.29	Rooba al-Omari; Bahrain	20.00
Discus throw	F56/57	Hashemiyeh Motaghian; Iran	21.17 AR	Famini; Indonesia	19.67	Tian Yuxin; China	26.92
Javelin throw	F12/13	Zhao Yuping; China	44.96 WR	Liu Ya-ting; Chinese Taipei	34.26	Ozra Mahdavikiya; Iran	32.24
Javelin throw	F33/34	Zou Lijuan; China	22.28 WR	Faezeh Kermani; Iran	17.22	Batoul Jahangiri; Iran	10.60 AR
Javelin throw	F46	Roziyakhon Ergasheva; Uzbekistan	34.10	Ramya Nagaranai; India	31.51	Maryam; United Arab Emirates	31.03
Javelin throw	F53/54	Yang Liwan; China	17.92	Elham Salehi; Iran	16.49	Deepa Malik; India	10.15
Javelin throw	F55/56	Lin Sitong; China	18.79 GR	Hashemiyeh Motaghian; Iran	20.19 GR	Natalya Semyonova; Uzbekistan	17.29
Javelin throw	F57	Mahnaz Amini Nogourani; Iran	25.68 AR	Mokhigul Khamdamova; Uzbekistan	24.19	Nguyễn Thị Hải; Vietnam	23.06
Shot put	F11/12	Sofiya Burkhanova; Uzbekistan	14.59 GR	Zhang Liangmin; China	11.34	Zhao Yuping; China	12.87
Shot put	F20	Suparniyati; Indonesia	10.75 AR	Hiromi Nakada; Japan	10.51	Tiwa; Indonesia	6.44
Shot put	F32	Arezoo Rahimi; Iran	4.27	Thekra al-Kaabi; United Arab Emirates	4.13	—	
Shot put	F33	Batoul Jahangiri; Iran	5.68 AR	Sara Hamdi Masoud; Qatar	5.45	Sara Al Senaani; United Arab Emirates	5.28
Shot put	F34	Zou Lijuan; China	8.19 GR	Fereshteh Moradi Moghadam; Iran	6.08	Basimah Najim; Kuwait	5.76
Shot put	F35/36/37	Mi Na; China	13.20 GR	Li Yingli; China	12.15	Wu Qing; China	8.92
Shot put	F40/41	Zhang Fengju; China	7.17	Erdenechimeg Unurmaa; Mongolia	6.09	Li Wei; China	7.10
Shot put	F43/44/62/64	Yao Juan; China	11.03	Yang Yue; China	10.20	Doriah Poulus; Malaysia	9.33
Shot put	F54	Yang Liwan; China	7.66 GR	Marziyeh Sedghi Saghinsara; Iran	6.30	Shahla Hadidi; Iran	5.85
Shot put	F55	Lin Sitong; China	7.07 GR	Rooba al-Omari; Bahrain	6.73	Parvin Moghaddam; Iran	6.68
Shot put	F56/57	Eshrat Kordestani; Iran	9.39 =AR	Tian Yuxin; China	9.09	Trương Bích Vân; Vietnam	7.33
WR world record | AR area record | CR championship record | GR games record | NR national record | OR Olympic record | PB personal best | SB season best | WL world leading (in a given season)

=== Mixed ===
Event	Gold		Silver		Bronze	
4×100 m universal relay	China; Zhou Guohua; Wang Hao; Yang Yifei; Zou Lihong	47.89	Japan; Uran Sawada; Keita Sato; Yuka Takamatsu; Tomoki Suzuki	49.04	Indonesia; Putri Aulia; Karisma Evi Tiarani; Saptoyoga Purnomo; Jaenal Aripin	50.09

== See also ==
- Athletics at the 2017 ASEAN Para Games
- Athletics at the 2018 Asian Games
