= Uzbekistan at the 2018 Asian Para Games =

- IPC code: UZB
- NPC: Uzbekistan National Paralympic Association

in Jakarta 6–13 October 2018
- Competitors: 53 in 5 sports
- Medals Ranked 6th: Gold 33 Silver 24 Bronze 18 Total 75

Asian Para Games appearances
- 2010; 2014; 2018; 2022

Uzbekistan participated at the 2018 Asian Para Games which was held in Jakarta, Indonesia from 6 to 13 October 2018. Uzbekistani delegation was composed of 53 athletes who competed in 5 sports, namely powerlifting, judo, shooting, swimming and athletics. In July 2019, Uzbekistan was stripped from 2 gold medals (one from judo and one from athletics) due to doping violation.

== Medals by sport ==
Medals by sport
Sport	1st place, gold medalist(s)	2nd place, silver medalist(s)	3rd place, bronze medalist(s)	Total
Athletics	13	6	7	26
Judo	4	5	5	14
Powerlifting	1	0	0	1
Swimming	15	13	6	34
Total	35	24	18	77

== Medals by day ==
Medals by day
Day	Date	1st place, gold medalist(s)	2nd place, silver medalist(s)	3rd place, bronze medalist(s)	Total
1	October 7	2	2	0	4
2	October 8	11	3	3	17
3	October 9	5	4	2	11
4	October 10	7	3	5	15
5	October 11	6	8	6	20
6	October 12	4	4	2	10
7	October 13	0	0	0	0
Total		35	24	18	77

== See also ==
- Uzbekistan at the 2018 Asian Games
