= Bhutan at the 2018 Asian Para Games =

Bhutan at 2018 Asian Para Games

- IPC code: BHU
- NPC: Bhutan Paralympic Committee

in Jakarta 6–13 October 2018
- Competitors: 2 in 2 sports
- Medals: Gold 0 Silver 0 Bronze 0 Total 0

Asian Para Games appearances
- 2018; 2022

Bhutan made their Asian Para Games debut in the 2018 edition of the games which was held in Jakarta, Indonesia from 6 to 13 October 2018.

The country's National Paralympic Committee, the Bhutan Paralympic Committee, has been recently established at the time of the games, having been founded in 2017. Bhutan was represented by two athletes; Pema Rigsel who competed in archery and Kinley Dem who participated in the shooting competition. Princess Ashi Euphelma Choden Wangchuck, the President of the Bhutan Paralympic Committee (BPC) was the delegation's chief.

== Archery ==
Pema Rigsel competed in the 70 metres wheelchair recurve archery event.

== Shooting ==
Kinley Dem participated in the 10 metres wheelchair rifle shooting event.

== See also ==
- Bhutan at the 2018 Asian Games
