= 2018 Asian Para Games =

Multi-sport event

III Asian Para Games
- Host city: Jakarta, Indonesia
- Motto: The Inspiring Spirit and Energy of Asia (Note: Only the English version of the motto were used during the Games. There is no Indonesian equivalent of the motto adopted.)
- Nations: 43
- Athletes: 2,762
- Events: 506 in 18 sports
- Opening: 6 October
- Closing: 13 October
- Opened by: Joko Widodo; President of Indonesia
- Closed by: Majid Rashed; President of the Asian Paralympic Committee
- Athlete's Oath: Banyu Tri Mulyo
- Judge's Oath: Bayu Widi
- Coach's Oath: Dinda Ayu Sekartaji
- Torch lighter: Jendi Pangabean
- Main venue: Gelora Bung Karno Main Stadium (opening ceremony); Gelora Bung Karno Madya Stadium (closing ceremony)
- Website: https://asianparagames2018.id (archived)

The 2018 Asian Para Games (Indonesian: Pesta Olahraga Difabel Asia 2018, Asian Para Games 2018), officially known as the 3rd Asian Para Games and also known as Indonesia 2018, was a pan-Asian multi-sport event that held from 6 to 13 October 2018 in Indonesia's capital city of Jakarta. The event paralleled the 2018 Asian Games and was held for Asian athletes with disability.

It was the first time Indonesia hosted the games. Events were held in the host city Jakarta and in Bogor Regency of West Java province. The opening ceremony was held at Gelora Bung Karno Main Stadium, while the closing ceremony was held at Gelora Bung Karno Madya Stadium next door. The games saw the debut of Bhutan as a participating nation and the introduction of chess to the Asian Para Games' program, with the removal of rowing, sailing, 5 and 7-a-side football, wheelchair dancesport and wheelchair rugby.

China led the medal tally for the third consecutive time. North Korea and South Korea march under the Korean Unification Flag at the opening ceremony and for the first time competed as a unified team in some events. They also won their first medals, one silver and one bronze medal as a unified team. In addition, Philippines and Kuwait won their first ever Asian Para Games gold medals, while Laos and East Timor won their first ever Asian Para Games medals including their first gold medals. There were 16 world, 63 Asian and 246 Asian Para Games records broken during the Games.

== Host city ==
As is the tradition of the event, since 2010, the Asian Para Games are usually held after every Asian Games in the same host country. On 29 February 2016, Indonesia signed the 2018 Asian Para Games host city contract at a ceremony in Jakarta, having confirmed as host city of the event on 21 October 2014 in Incheon, South Korea. A local organising committee named the Indonesia Asian Para Games Organizing Committee (INAPGOC) led by Raja Sapta Oktohari was formed soon after it was appointed host country of the 2018 Asian Para Games for all preparations, opening, organising, and finalizing the implementation of the event.

== Development and preparations ==
=== Volunteers ===
Volunteer recruitment was held from 21 April until 31 July 2018 with a target of 8,000 volunteers.

=== Torch relay ===
Like the torch relay of the 2018 Asian Games, the torch relay began at the Mrapen in Central Java on 5 September 2018 where the torch was lit using the natural eternal flame to start the 30-day countdown to the event. The relay route passed through the 8 largest cities in Indonesia until arriving in Jakarta. Below is the schedule of the relay:

- Solo (Surakarta), Central Java (5 September)
- Ternate, North Maluku (9 September)
- Makassar, South Sulawesi (12 September)
- Denpasar, Bali (16 September)
- Pontianak, West Kalimantan (19 September)
- Medan, North Sumatera (23 September)
- Pangkal Pinang, Bangka Belitung Islands (26 September)
- Jakarta (Host city, 30 September)

A day before the torch relay start, the games' final torch design was introduced, in which its design is inspired by Batik parang motif.

=== Marketing ===
==== Emblem ====
The emblem of the games was Harmony - Energy of Asia, modelled upon the circular roof of the Gelora Bung Karno Stadium, the main venue of the games. It represented harmony and balance within the natural environment and the people of the Asian community. The moving man in the center of the circle symbolize the movement and energy of the 2018 Asian Para Games participating athletes in achieving victory, while the 3 curves surrounding the man's silhouette represents unity in diversity among Asian countries for mutual achievement. 5 different colours are used in the logo to represent the basic elements in Asian philosophy of Living and togetherness. Blue symbolized the sky, orange symbolized the sun, green symbolized the nature, purple symbolized proximity, wisdom, loyalty, and pride and red symbolized the spirit of solidarity.

==== Mascot ====
Momo, mascot of the 2018 Asian Para Games

The official mascot of the Games is a Bondol eagle named Momo whose name is short for motivation and mobility. Momo represents the icon of the capital city of Jakarta and also represents spirit. Momo wears a Betawinese Belt with Sarong.

==== Medals ====
On 5 October 2018, Indonesia Asian Para Games Organizing Committee (INAPGOC) released the medal design to the public which is inspired by the Rio 2016 Summer Paralympics medal, featuring the Asian Para Games logo on the obverse and the braille letters on the reverse. Each medal contains differing numbers of metal balls to allow the visually impaired to audibly distinguish their colour by shaking them.

==== Merchandising ====
Merchandises including the mascot plush toy were sold at the Gelora Bung Karno Main stadium area including the super store during the games.

==== Music ====
Six songs were released to promote the games, including the official theme song "Song of Victory", which was used as the background music for the games' broadcast title sequence. Two songs were not specifically composed for the games, like "Sang Juara" by Naura and Zizi, which is a version of the former's 2017 song "Juara" and a short version of 2016-released song "Manusia Kuat" by Tulus.

No.	Title	Lyrics	Music	Performer(s)	Length
1.	"Song of Victory"	Ezra Lilipory	Ezra Lilipory; Dharana Moniaga; M. S. Alwi	Armand Maulana; Lesti; Maudy Ayunda; Once; Putri Ariani; Regina Poetiray; Vidi Aldiano; Zara Leola	3:00
2.	"Sang Juara" (The Champion)		Andi Rianto	Naura; Zizi	3:03
3.	"I Wanna Dance"			Ayesha feat. Tompi	3:32
4.	"Dream High"			Sheryl Sheinafia; Claudia	3:10
5.	"Kita Semua Sama" (We are All the Same)	Raja Sapta Oktohari; Seno M. Hardjo; Ika Ratih Poespa	Kevaz Jones	Billy Talahatu; Glenn Fredly; Maria Calista; Nania Yusuf; Tasya Rosmala; feat. Rejoz	4:11
6.	"Manusia Kuat" (Strong Human)	Tulus	Ferry Nurhayat; Ari Renaldi	Tulus	3:05

=== Venues ===
The Gelora Bung Karno Sports Complex at night

The 2018 Asian Para Games uses most venues that are used to host the 2018 Asian Games events. They are located in Jakarta and neighbouring West Java province.

==== Gelora Bung Karno Sports Complex ====
Venue	Events	Capacity
Aquatic Stadium	Swimming	7,800
Archery Field	Archery	293
Basketball Hall	Wheelchair basketball	2,400
Hockey Field (Court 2)	Lawn bowls	818
Main Stadium	Opening ceremony, Athletics	77,193
Madya Stadium	Closing ceremony	9,170
Istora	Badminton	7,166
Shooting Range	Shooting	
Tennis Indoor Stadium	Sitting volleyball	3,750

==== Central Jakarta ====
Venue	Events	Capacity	Location
Cempaka Putih Sports Hall	Chess		Cempaka Putih
Jakarta International Expo	Judo		Kemayoran

==== East Jakarta ====
Venue	Events	Capacity	Location
Jakarta International Velodrome	Cycling (track)	3,000	Rawamangun
POPKI Sports Hall	Wheelchair fencing		Cibubur

==== North Jakarta ====
Venue	Events	Capacity	Location
Ecovention Ancol	Table tennis		Ancol
Jaya Ancol Bowling Center	Bowling		Ancol
Klub Kelapa Gading	Wheelchair tennis		Kelapa Gading
Tanjung Priok Sports Hall	Boccia		Tanjung Priok

==== South Jakarta ====
Venue	Events	Capacity	Location
Balai Kartini	Goalball		Setiabudi
Balai Sudirman	Powerlifting		Tebet

==== Jakarta Suburb (West Java) ====
Venue	Events	Capacity	Location
Sentul International Circuit	Cycling (road race)	50,000	Babakan Madang, Bogor Regency

The games uses the same Athletes' Village as the 2018 Asian Games which was built in Kemayoran.

=== Transport ===
Like during the 2018 Asian Games, TransJakarta provides free bus rides involving 300 disabled-friendly buses which consists of 200 low-entry buses and 100 high-entry buses during the games for disabled athletes everyday and on weekend days during the games for the locals to encourage people to watch the games.

== The Games ==
=== Opening ceremony ===
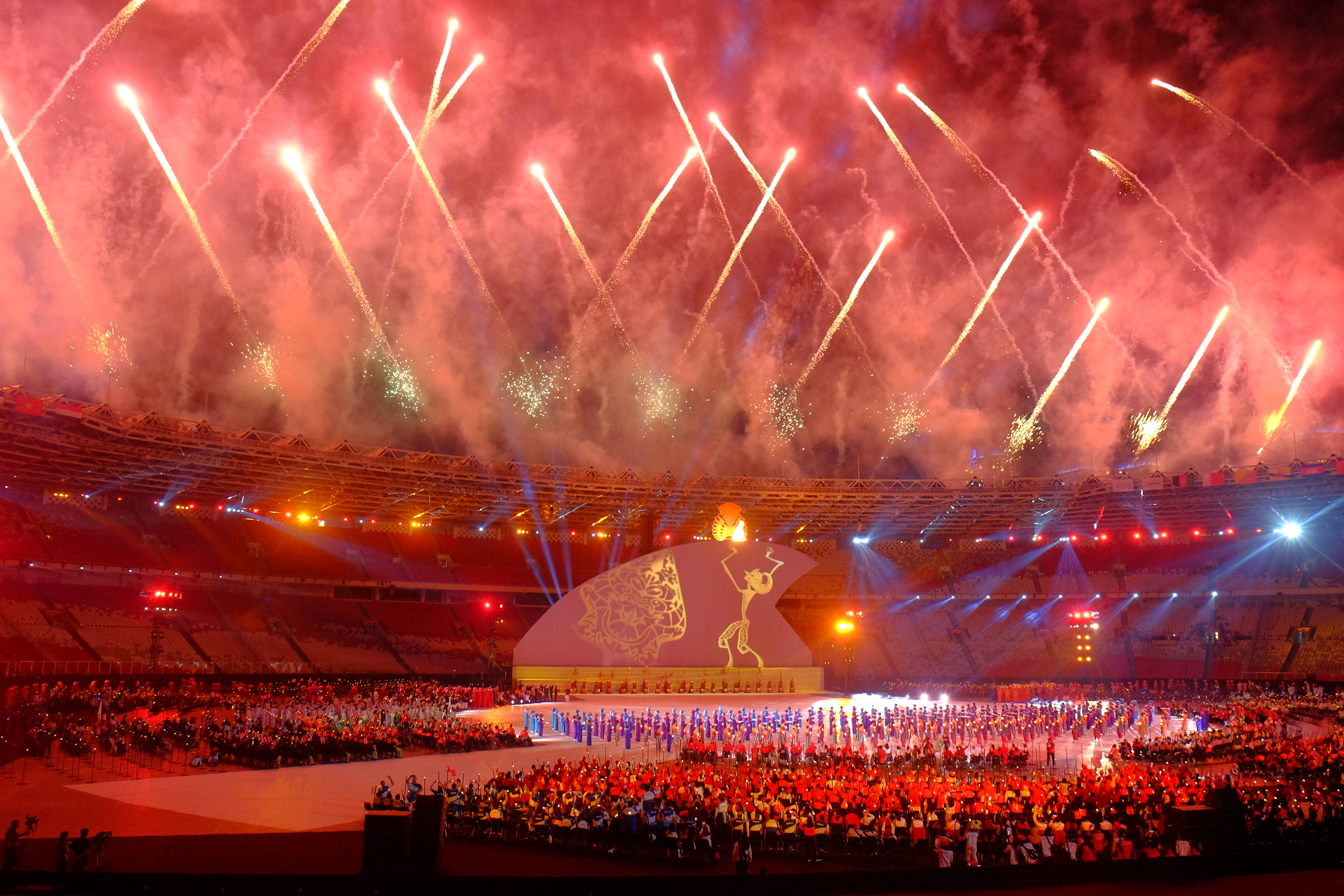
The cauldron was being lit up

The opening ceremony of the 2018 Asian Para Games took place on Saturday, 6 October 2018, at the Gelora Bung Karno Main Stadium in Jakarta, Indonesia. The event commenced at 19:00 Indonesia Western Time (UTC+7) and ended at 21:43 local time. Jay Subiyakto was the Associate creative director of the ceremony. North and South Korea delegates marched together under one unified flag of Korea for the first time.

The games was officially opened by the President of Indonesia, Joko Widodo.

=== Sports ===
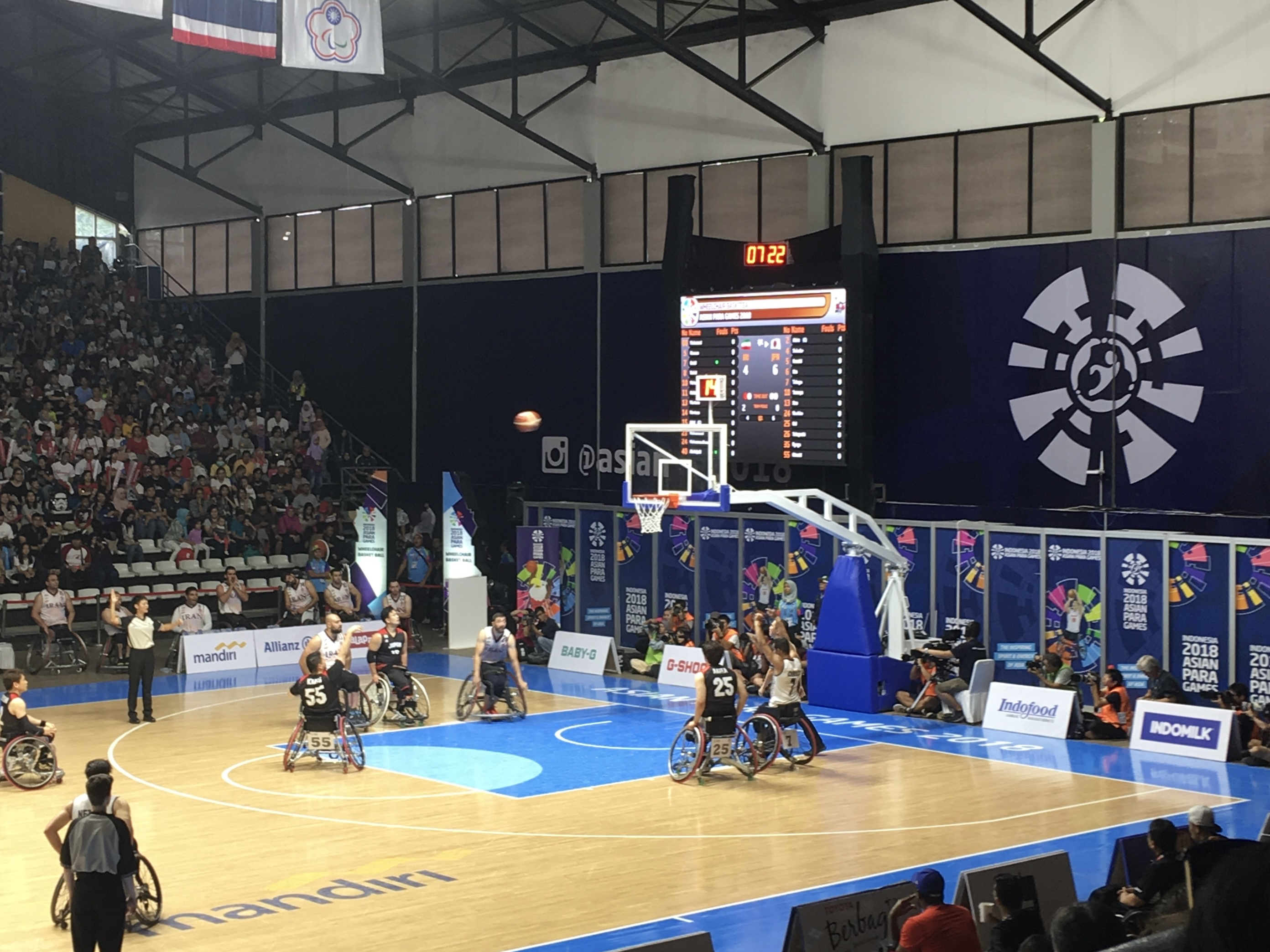
The men's wheelchair basketball final between Iran (white) and Japan (black)

The Games featured 18 sports which were split into 506 events, including chess which was included for the first time in the games' programme.

- Archery (9)
- Athletics (161)
- Badminton (19)
- Boccia (7)
- Bowling (18)
- Chess (24)
- Cycling (27)
  - Road
  - Track
- Goalball (2)
- Judo (15)
- Lawn bowls (15)
- Powerlifting (20)
- Shooting (13)
- Sitting volleyball (2)
- Swimming (106)
- Table tennis (42)
- Wheelchair basketball (2)
- Wheelchair fencing (18)
- Wheelchair tennis (6)

In addition, there were 16 non-medal events contested at the games, 6 in Athletics and 10 in Swimming.

=== Participating National Paralympic Committees ===
43 members of the Asian Paralympic Committee participated at the Games. In addition, the two Koreas competed as one joint team in selected events, the first time doing so in any para sport event which makes it the 44th participant of the games. Both nations also marched together under one flag during the opening and closing ceremonies. Bhutan and Yemen participated for the first time.

Below is a list of all the participating NPCs. The number of competitors per delegation is indicated in brackets.

Participating National Paralympic Committees
- Afghanistan (24)
- Bahrain (14)
- Bhutan (2)
- Brunei (8)
- Cambodia (29)
- China (231)
- Hong Kong (101)
- India (188)
- Indonesia (294) (host)
- Iran (207)
- Iraq (78)
- Japan (303) (Top)
- Jordan (8)
- Kazakhstan (90)
- North Korea (7)*
- South Korea (201)*
- Kuwait (23)
- Kyrgyzstan (5)
- Laos (16)
- Lebanon (1)
- Macau (23)
- Malaysia (126)
- Mongolia (40)
- Myanmar (26)
- Nepal (13)
- Oman (9)
- Pakistan (4)
- Palestine (1)
- Philippines (57)
- Qatar (13)
- Saudi Arabia (27)
- Singapore (44)
- Sri Lanka (35)
- Syria (9)
- Chinese Taipei (89)
- Tajikistan (2)
- Thailand (237)
- Timor-Leste (19)
- Turkmenistan (5)
- United Arab Emirates (42)
- Uzbekistan (53)
- Vietnam (52)
- Yemen (1)

Number of athletes by National Paralympic Committees (by highest to lowest)

IPC	Country	Athletes
JPN	Japan	303
INA	Indonesia	294
THA	Thailand	237
CHN	China	231
IRI	Iran	207
KOR	South Korea	201
IND	India	188
MAS	Malaysia	126
HKG	Hong Kong	101
KAZ	Kazakhstan	90
TPE	Chinese Taipei	89
IRQ	Iraq	78
PHI	Philippines	57
UZB	Uzbekistan	53
VIE	Vietnam	52
SGP	Singapore	44
UAE	United Arab Emirates	42
MGL	Mongolia	40
SRI	Sri Lanka	35
CAM	Cambodia	29
KSA	Saudi Arabia	27
MYA	Myanmar	26
AFG	Afghanistan	24
KUW	Kuwait	23
MAC	Macau	23
TLS	Timor-Leste	19
LAO	Laos	16
BRN	Bahrain	14
NEP	Nepal	13
QAT	Qatar	13
OMA	Oman	9
SYR	Syria	9
BRU	Brunei	8
JOR	Jordan	8
PRK	North Korea	7
KGZ	Kyrgyzstan	5
TKM	Turkmenistan	5
PAK	Pakistan	4
BHU	Bhutan	2
TJK	Tajikistan	2
LIB	Lebanon	1
PLE	Palestine	1
YEM	Yemen	1

* Including athletes represented Korea (12). Unlike Asian Games, athletes of unified Korean team at the games also competed under respective national team in individual events.

=== Calendar ===
All times are in Western Indonesia Time (UTC+7)

OC	Opening ceremony	●	Event competitions	1	Gold medal events	CC	Closing ceremony

October		6th Sat	7th Sun	8th Mon	9th Tue	10th Wed	11th Thu	12th Fri	13th Sat	Events
Ceremonies		OC							CC	—N/a
Archery			●	●	●	6	3			9
Athletics				31	35	31	33	31		161
Badminton		●	1	●	●	●	●	9	9	19
Boccia			●	●	●	4	●	3		7
Bowling				5	6	5	2			18
Chess			●	●	●	12	●	12		24
Cycling	Road cycling			8	5					27
Cycling	Track cycling						4	4	6	27
Goalball			●	●	●	●	●	2		2
Judo				4	4	5	2			15
Lawn bowls			1	5	1	3	●	5		15
Powerlifting			3	4	4	3	3	3		20
Shooting				3	4	2	2	2		13
Sitting volleyball			●	●	●	●	2			2
Swimming			16	20	20	16	18	16		106
Table tennis		●	●	9	11	11	●	5	6	42
Wheelchair basketball		●	●	●	●	●	●	1	1	2
Wheelchair fencing			4	2	6	4	2			18
Wheelchair tennis			●	●	●	●	3	3		6
Daily medal events			25	91	96	102	74	96	22	506
Cumulative Total			25	116	212	314	388	484	506	506
October		6th Sat	7th Sun	8th Mon	9th Tue	10th Wed	11th Thu	12th Fri	13th Sat	Events

=== Closing ceremony ===
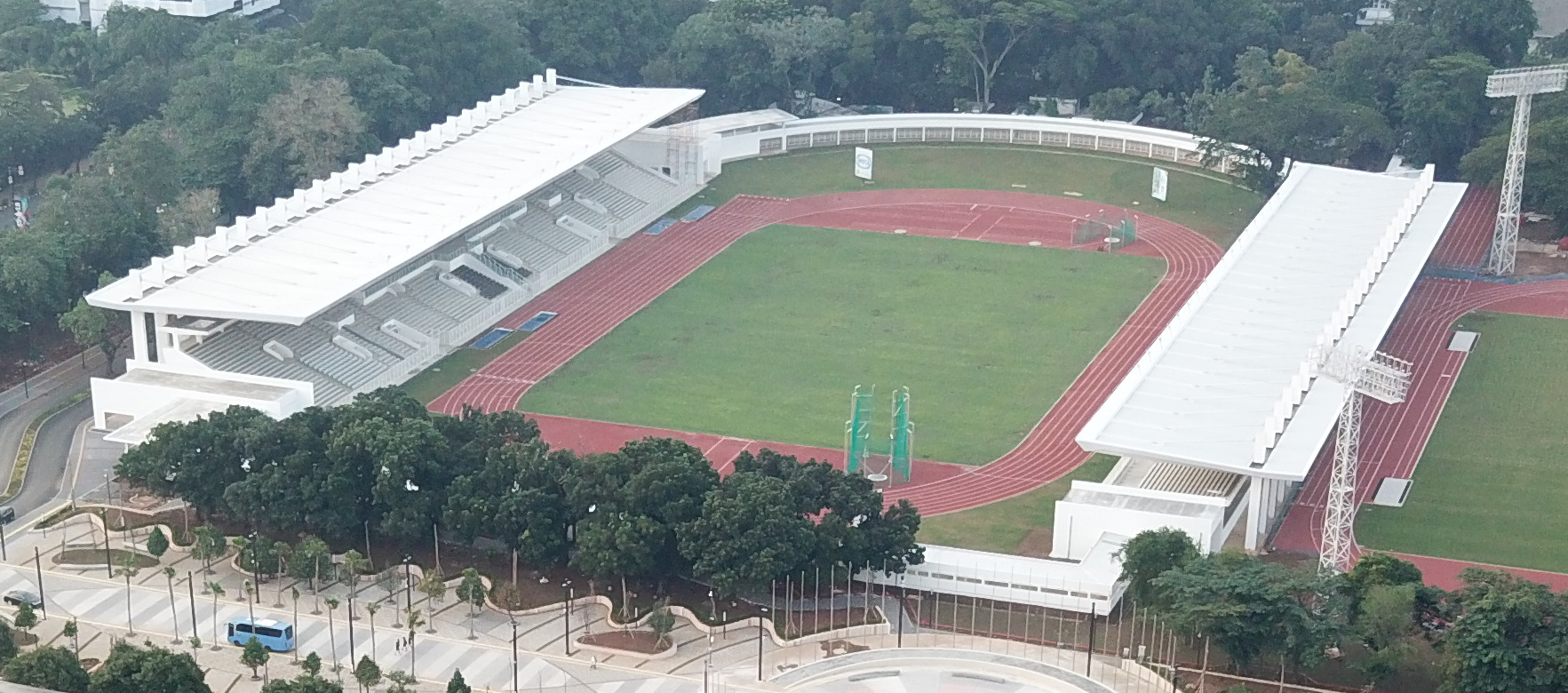
Venue of the closing ceremony

The 2018 Asian Para Games closing ceremony was held on Saturday, 13 October 2018 at the Gelora Bung Karno Madya Stadium in Jakarta. In addition to local artists and a Hangzhou Asian Para Games promotional video segment, the South Korean girlband AOA performed in the ceremony. Vice Mayor of Hangzhou Wang Hong received the APC flag as the host of the next Games.

== Medal table ==
The 2018 Asian Para Games had 506 events, resulted in 506 medal sets being distributed. One additional gold medal was awarded as there was a first-place tie in Swimming men's S7 100 m backstroke event. As a consequence, no silver medal was awarded in that event. One additional silver medal was awarded as there was a second-place tie in Athletics men's T45/46/47 high jump event. As a consequence, no bronze medal was awarded in that event.

Two bronze medals were awarded in most events in racket sports (18 in Badminton, 23 in Table tennis and 12 in Wheelchair fencing) and one martial art (15 in Judo). Furthermore, there was a third-place tie in the Bowling mixed singles TPB10 event, giving a total of 69 additional bronze medals.

On the other hand, 7 silvers and 37 bronze medals were not awarded in 37 events in 7 sports due to lack of participants: 2 bronze each in Archery and chess, 1 silver and 4 bronze in cycling, 4 bronze in lawn bowls, 6 silver and 18 bronzes in athletics, 1 bronze in swimming and 6 bronzes in table tennis. A silver medal was not awarded in judo due to the disqualification of a judoka in the finals. Some medals in athletics and judo were reallocated due to doping violation.

As a result, a total of 1,541 medals comprising 507 gold medals, 497 silver medals and 537 bronze medals were awarded to athletes.

* Host nation (Indonesia)

2018 Asian Para Games medal table
Rank	NPC	Gold	Silver	Bronze	Total
1	China (CHN)	172	88	59	319
2	South Korea (KOR)	54	44	46	144
3	Iran (IRI)	51	43	42	136
4	Japan (JPN)	45	70	83	198
5	Indonesia (INA)*	37	47	51	135
6	Uzbekistan (UZB)	33	24	18	75
7	Thailand (THA)	23	33	50	106
8	Malaysia (MAS)	17	26	25	68
9	India (IND)	15	24	33	72
10	Hong Kong (HKG)	11	16	21	48
11	Philippines (PHI)	10	8	11	29
12	Vietnam (VIE)	8	8	24	40
13	Kazakhstan (KAZ)	5	15	13	33
14	Sri Lanka (SRI)	5	5	5	15
15	Iraq (IRQ)	3	6	11	20
16	Singapore (SGP)	3	2	5	10
17	Chinese Taipei (TPE)	2	9	14	25
18	United Arab Emirates (UAE)	2	6	3	11
19	Saudi Arabia (KSA)	2	3	3	8
20	Pakistan (PAK)	2	0	1	3
20	Timor-Leste (TLS)	2	0	1	3
22	Kuwait (KUW)	1	3	4	8
23	Oman (OMA)	1	3	1	5
24	Jordan (JOR)	1	2	0	3
25	Mongolia (MGL)	1	1	3	5
26	Laos (LAO)	1	0	0	1
27	Myanmar (MYA)	0	4	2	6
28	Bahrain (BRN)	0	2	1	3
28	Macau (MAC)	0	2	1	3
30	Syria (SYR)	0	1	4	5
31	Korea (COR)	0	1	1	2
32	Qatar (QAT)	0	1	0	1
33	Turkmenistan (TKM)	0	0	1	1
Totals (33 entries)		507	497	537	1,541

=== Official changes by country ===
In accordance with the APC Anti-Doping Rules, expired the result of Mirzaev Nurbek in Judo Men’s 81 kg event and Abdullaeva Kamolakhon in Women’s Long Jump T45/46/47. South Korea secures gold in judo after Chinese judoka’s disqualification in Judo Women’s +70 kg event.

NOC	Gold	Silver	Bronze	Total
Uzbekistan	-2	0	0	−2
China	-1	0	0	−1
South Korea	+2	−2	0	0
Sri Lanka	+1	−1	+1	+1
Iran	0	+1	−1	0

The official result of Men’s 81 kg was revised as follows:

Gold: Lee Jungmin (KOR)

Bronze: Jafari Seyed Omid (IRI)

Bronze: Kitazono Aramitsu (JPN)

The official result of the Women’s Long Jump T45/46/47 was revised as follows:

Gold: Lallwala Palliyagurunnans Amara Indumathi Karunathi (SRI)

Silver: Bornaki Zahra (IRI)

Bronze: Dissanayaka Mudiyanselage Kumudu Priyanka (SRI)

=== NPCs without medal ===
- Afghanistan (AFG)
- Bhutan (BHU)
- Brunei (BRU)
- Cambodia (CAM)
- North Korea (PRK)
- Kyrgyzstan (KGZ)
- Lebanon (LBN)
- Nepal (NEP)
- Palestine (PLE)
- Tajikistan (TJK)
- Yemen (YEM)

=== Podium Sweeps ===
Sport	Event	NOC	Gold	Silver	Bronze
Athletics	Men's Discus Throw F51/52/53	Iran (IRI)	Hossein Khorsandamiri	Asadollah Azimi	Alireza Mokhtari Hemami
Athletics	Men's Discus Throw F54/55/56	Iran (IRI)	Alireza Ghaleh Nasseri	Jalil Bagheri Jeddi	Hamed Amiri
Athletics	Men's Javelin Throw F56/57	Iran (IRI)	Mohammad Alvanpour	Amanolah Papi	Mohammad Khalvandi
Athletics	Men's 5000m T11	Japan (JPN)	Kenya Karasawa	Shinya Wada	Masahiro Taniguchi
Athletics	Women's 1500m T20	Japan (JPN)	Sayaka Makita	Moeko Yamamoto	Misaki Ari
Athletics	Women's Shot Put F35/36/37	China (CHN)	Mi Na	Li Yingli	Wu Qing
Athletics	Men's High Jump T42/63	India (IND)	Sharad Kumar	Varun Bhati	Mariyappan Thangavelu
Athletics	Women's 100m T13	Indonesia (INA)	Putri Aulia	Ni Made Arianti	Endang Sari Sitorus
Athletics	Men's 200m T42/63	Sri Lanka (SRI)	Prasan Warnakulasooriya	Chuladasa Abarana	Buddika Indrapala
Athletics	Men's 1500m T53/54	Thailand (THA)	Prawat Wahoram	Putharet Khongrak	Rawat Tana
Shooting	Women's 50m Rifle Three Position SH1	China (CHN)	Zhang Cuiping	Yan Yaping	Bai Xiaohong
Swimming	Men's 100m Freestyle S13	Uzbekistan (UZB)	Islam Aslanov	Muzaffar Tursunkhujaev	Dmitriy Horlin
Swimming	Men's 100m Butterfly S13	Uzbekistan (UZB)	Islam Aslanov	Kirill Pankov	Dmitriy Horlin
Swimming	Women's 100m Backstroke S13	Uzbekistan (UZB)	Shokhsanamkhon Toshpulatova	Nigorakhon Mirzokhidova	Fotimakhon Amilova
Swimming	Women's 100m Butterfly S13	Uzbekistan (UZB)	Shokhsanamkhon Toshpulatova	Fotimakhon Amilova	Nigorakhon Mirzokhidova
Swimming	Women's 100m Breaststroke SB13	Uzbekistan (UZB)	Fotimakhon Amilova	Shokhsanamkhon Toshpulatova	Nigorakhon Mirzokhidova
Swimming	Men's 100m Breaststroke SB14	Japan (JPN)	Yasuhiro Tanaka	Dai Tokairin	Taiga Hayashida
Wheelchair Tennis	Men's Single	Japan (JPN)	Shingo Kunieda	Takashi Sanada	Kohei Suzuki

== Concerns and controversies ==
- Like in the Asian Games, Jakarta was struggling to solve traffic congestion and air pollution problems.
- On 8 October 2018, Indonesian judoka Miftahul Jannah was not allowed to compete, after she refused to take off her hijab, a head cover which is prohibited from being worn during competition according to one of International Judo Federation rules which states that the head of the judoka shall not be covered except for bandaging of a medical nature. President of the Indonesian National Paralympic Committee Senny Marbun said the incident occurred because of the committee's negligence and the judo coach appointed by the committee was unaware of the rule and confused over it because of poor English.
- On 9 October 2018, Iran beat Iraq in the men's goalball group B match after the referee awarded Iran five penalties. The Iraqi team led 6-5 at half time in the Pool B match, but eventually fell to a 14-9 defeat. Iraqi coach Yosefian Mahmod blamed the referee for the loss saying the referee's decision disadvantaged the team.

== See also ==
- 2018 Asian Games
- 2018 Winter Paralympics

== Notes ==
Preceded by Incheon	Asian Para Games; Jakarta; III Asian Para Games (2018)	Succeeded by Hangzhou
