= Philippines at the 2018 Asian Para Games =

- IPC code: PHI
- NPC: Paralympic Committee of the Philippines

in Jakarta 6–13 October 2018
- Competitors: 57 in 10 sports
- Medals Ranked 11th: Gold 10 Silver 8 Bronze 11 Total 29

Asian Para Games appearances (overview)
- 2010; 2014; 2018; 2022; 2026

Youth appearances
- 2009; 2013; 2017; 2021

The Philippines participated at the 2018 Asian Para Games which was held in Jakarta, Indonesia from 6 to 13 October 2018.

57 athletes contested in 10 out of 18 events in the games with Francis Carlos Diaz serving as chef de mission of the Philippine delegation. According to Diaz, Filipino para-athletes had better preparation for this edition of the Games compared to the last edition held in 2014 in Incheon, South Korea. The Philippine Sports Commission, a sports government agency, has given an "astronomical" amount of financial aid to the athletes relative to aid given in the previous editions which was used to buy their training equipment and supplies and they had a year long of training similar to non para-athletes. They have also secured sponsorship from small-scale private firms.

With improved financial support from both the government and the private sector, and the Philippines targeted to surpass its previous performance in the 2014 edition where the country won five silver and five bronze medals. The athletes were aiming to win the country's first gold medal in the Asian Para Games in this edition of the games. The delegation garnered 29 medals, ten of which were gold, and placed 11th overall improving from their 29th place finish at the 2014 games. Chess and swimming were the primary contributor to the Philippines' medal tally.

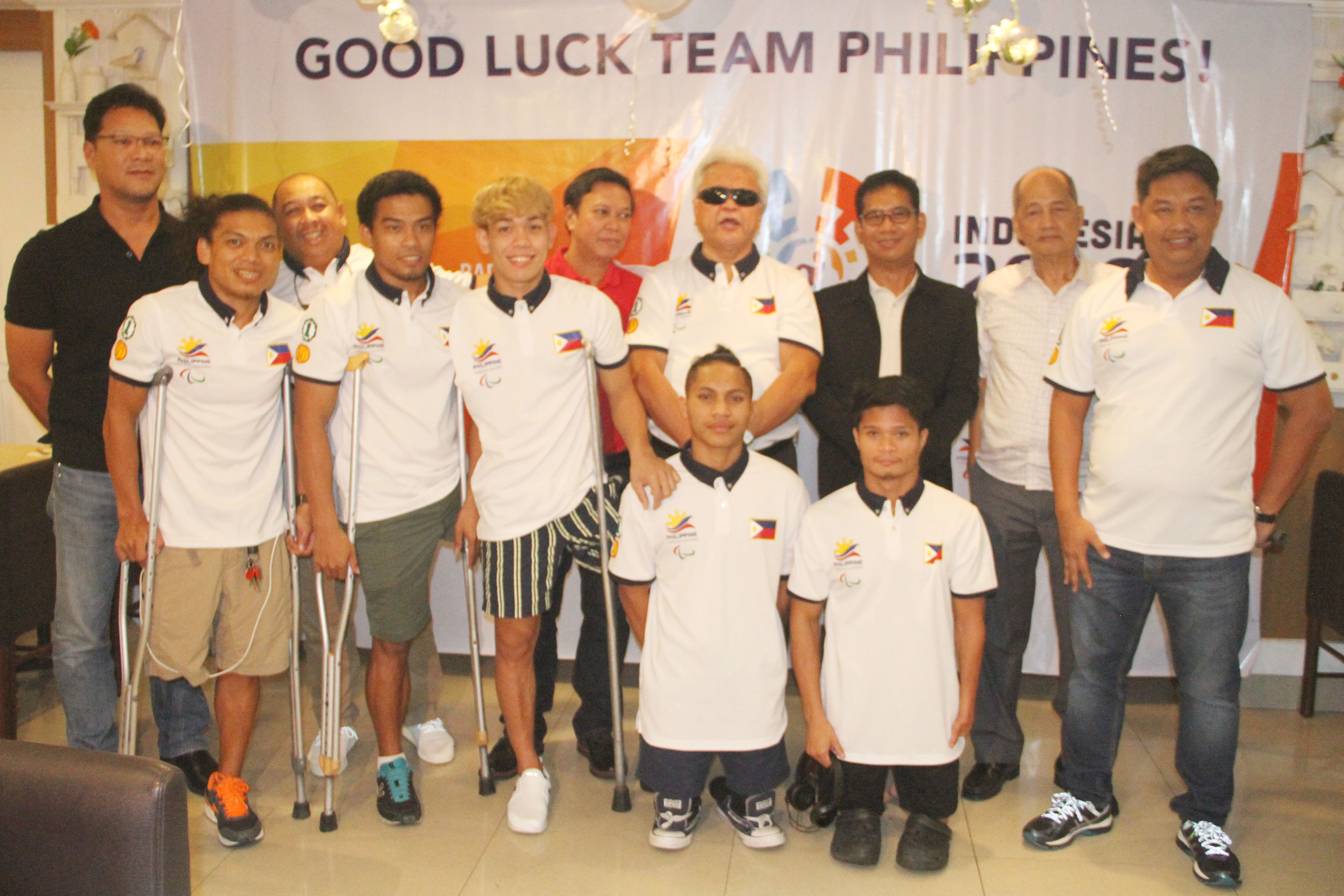
Some of the Filipino athletes who will compete at the 2018 Asian Para Games along with sports officials.

== Medalist ==
=== Gold ===
No.	Medal	Name	Sport	Event	Date
1	Gold	Kim Ian Chi	Bowling	Mixed Singles TPB10	October 8
2	Gold	Sander Severino	Chess	Men's Individual Standard Class P1	October 10
3	Gold	Sander Severino; Jasper Rom; Henry Roger Lopez	Chess	Men's Team Standard Class P1	October 10
4	Gold	Sander Severino	Chess	Men's Individual Rapid Class P1	October 12
5	Gold	Sander Severino; Jasper Rom; Henry Roger Lopez	Chess	Men's Team Rapid Class P1	October 12
6	Gold	Arman Subaste; Menandro Redor; Israel Peligro	Chess	Men's Team Standard Class B2/3	October 10
7	Gold	Arthus Bucay	Cycling	Men's Pursuit C5	October 12
8	Gold	Ernie Gawilan	Swimming	Men's 400m Freestyle S7 (6-7)	October 12
9	Gold	Ernie Gawilan	Swimming	Men's 100m Backstroke S7	October 10
10	Gold	Ernie Gawilan	Swimming	Men's 200m Individual Medley SM7	October 7

=== Silver ===
No.	Medal	Name	Sport	Event	Date
1	Silver	Kim Ian Chi; Matias Samuel	Bowling	Mixed Doubles TPB10 + TPB10	October 10
2	Silver	Henry Roger Lopez	Chess	Men's Individual Rapid Class P1	October 12
3	Silver	Menandro Redor	Chess	Men's Individual Standard Class B2/3	October 10
4	Silver	Achelle Guion	Powerlifting	Women's 45kg	October 7
5	Silver	Gary Bejino	Swimming	Men's 200m Individual Medley SM6 (5-6)	October 12
6	Silver	Ernie Gawilan	Swimming	Men's 50m Freestyle S7	October 7
7	Silver	Ernie Gawilan	Swimming	Men's 100m Freestyle S7	October 9
8	Silver	Josephine Medina	Table Tennis	Women's Singles Class TT8	October 9

=== Bronze ===
No.	Medal	Name	Sport	Event	Date
1	Bronze	Jasper Rom	Chess	Men's Individual Standard Class P1	October 10
2	Bronze	Jasper Rom	Chess	Men's Individual Rapid Class P1	October 12
3	Bronze	Francis Ching; Rodolfo Sarmiento; Cecilio Bilog	Chess	Men's Team Rapid Class B1	October 12
4	Bronze	Arman Subaste	Chess	Men's Individual Standard Class B2/3	October 12
5	Bronze	Arman Subaste	Chess	Men's Individual Rapid Class B2/3	October 10
6	Bronze	Arman Subaste; Menandro Redor; Israel Peligro	Chess	Men's Team Rapid Class B2/3	October 12
7	Bronze	Godfrey Taberna	Cycling	Men's Road Race C4	October 9
8	Bronze	Arthus Bucay	Cycling	Men's Time Trial C5	October 8
9	Bronze	Adeline Dumapong	Powerlifting	Women's +86kg	October 11
10	Bronze	Gary Bejino	Swimming	Men's 100m Freestyle S6	October 9
11	Bronze	Gary Bejino	Swimming	Men's 100m Backstroke S6	October 7

=== Multiple ===
Name	Sport	Gold	Silver	Bronze	Total
Sander Severino	Chess	4	0	0	4
Ernie Gawilan	Swimming	3	2	0	5
Henry Roger Lopez	Chess	2	1	0	3
Jasper Rom	Chess	2	0	2	4
Menandro Redor	Chess	1	1	1	3
Kim Ian Chi	Bowling	1	1	0	2
Arman Subaste	Chess	1	0	3	4
Arthus Bucay	Cycling	1	0	1	2
Israel Peligro	Chess	1	0	1	2
Gary Bejino	Swimming	0	1	2	3

== Medal summary ==
=== By sports ===
Sport	Gold	Silver	Bronze	Total
Chess	5	2	6	13
Swimming	3	3	2	8
Bowling	1	1	0	2
Cycling	1	0	2	3
Powerlifting	0	1	1	2
Table Tennis	0	1	0	1
Totals (6 entries)	10	8	11	29

=== By date ===
Day	Date	1st place, gold medalist(s)	2nd place, silver medalist(s)	3rd place, bronze medalist(s)	Total
1	October 7	1	2	1	4
2	October 8	1	0	1	2
3	October 9	0	2	2	4
4	October 10	4	2	2	8
5	October 11	0	0	1	1
6	October 12	4	2	4	10
7	October 13	0	0	0	0
Total		10	8	11	29

== Archery ==
The Philippines has entered two archers.

Men

Athlete	Event	Ranking round		Round of 16	Quarterfinals	Semifinals	Finals	
Athlete	Event	Score	Seed	Opposition Score	Opposition Score	Opposition Score	Opposition Score	Rank
Giovanni Ola	Men's individual recurve open	605	11					

Women

Athlete	Event	Ranking round		Quarterfinals	Semifinals	Finals	
Athlete	Event	Score	Seed	Opposition Score	Opposition Score	Opposition Score	Rank
Agustina Bantiloc	Women's individual compound W1	589	2				

== Athletics ==
Nine athletes will represent the Philippines in the games.

- Prudencia Panaligan
- Andy Avellana
- Jerrold Pete Mangliwan
- Joel Balatucan
- Evaristo Carbonel
- Jeanette Acebeda
- Marites Burce
- Arman Dino
- Cendy Asusano

== Badminton ==
The Philippines entered three badminton players.

Men

Athlete	Event	Group Stage	Rank	Quarterfinals	Semifinals	Final / BM	Rank
Athlete	Event	Opposition Result	Rank	Opposition Result	Opposition Result	Opposition Result	Rank
Jonas Matados	Singles WH1	Subhan (INA); L 0–2	4	Did not advance			
Jonas Matados	Singles WH1	Nagashima (JPN); L 0–2	4	Did not advance			
Jonas Matados	Singles WH1	Hoang (VIE); L 0–2	4	Did not advance			

Women

Athlete	Event	Group Stage	Rank	Quarterfinals	Semifinals	Final / BM	Rank
Athlete	Event	Opposition Result	Rank	Opposition Result	Opposition Result	Opposition Result	Rank
Paz Lita	Singles SL4	Wetwithan (THA); L 0–2	3	Did not advance			
Paz Lita	Singles SL4	Lee (KOR); L 0–2	3	Did not advance			
Kathleen Pedrosa	Singles WH2	Cheng (CHN); L 0–2	4	Did not advance			
Kathleen Pedrosa	Singles WH2	Sukohandoko (INA); L 0–2	4	Did not advance			
Kathleen Pedrosa	Singles WH2	Nugraheni (INA); L 0–2	4	Did not advance			

Mixed

Athlete	Event	Group Stage	Rank	Quarterfinals	Semifinals	Final / BM	Rank
Athlete	Event	Opposition Result	Rank	Opposition Result	Opposition Result	Opposition Result	Rank
Jonas Matados; Paz Lita	Doubles WH1-WH2	Nagashima / Yamazaki (JPN); L 0–2	3	Did not advance			
Jonas Matados; Paz Lita	Doubles WH1-WH2	Junthong / Pookham (THA); L 0–2	3	Did not advance			

== Chess ==
The Philippines entered 12 chess players.

Men

Athlete	Event	Round 1	Round 2	Round 3	Round 4	Round 5	Round 6	Round 7	Final Score	Rank
Sander Severino	Men's Individual Standard P1	Sinaga (INA); W 1–0	Firdaus (INA); W 1–0	Kutwal (IND); W 1–0	Rom (PHI); W 1–0	Soltanov (KAZ); D 0.5–0.5	Sutikno (INA); D 0.5–0.5	Kuchibhotla (IND); D 0.5–0.5	5.5	1st place, gold medalist(s)
Jasper Rom	Men's Individual Standard P1	Arigala (IND); W 1–0	L.J. Sarmento (TLS); W 1–0	Firdaus (INA); L 0–1	Severino (PHI); L 0–1	Kuchibhotla (IND); W 1–0	Sinaga (INA); W 1–0	Soltanov (KAZ); W 1–0	5.0	3rd place, bronze medalist(s)
Henry Roger Lopez	Men's Individual Standard P1	Soltanov (KAZ); D 0.5–0.5	Sinaga (INA); D 0.5–0.5	Sutikno (INA); D 0.5–0.5	Firdaus (INA); L 0–1	N/A	L.J. Sarmento (TLS); W 1–0	Kutwal (IND); W 1–0	3.5	–
Sander Severino	Men's Individual Rapid P1	Sinaga (INA); W 1–0	Kuchibhotla (IND); W 1–0	Rom (PHI); W 1–0	Lopez (PHI); W 1–0	Sutikno (INA); W 1–0	Kutwal (IND); D 0.5–0.5	Soltanov (KAZ); W 1–0	6.5	1st place, gold medalist(s)
Jasper Rom	Men's Individual Rapid P1	Sutikno (INA); W 1–0	L.J. Sarmento (TLS); W 1–0	Severino (PHI); L 0–1	Firdaus (INA); D 0.5–0.5	Soltanov (KAZ); D 0.5–0.5	Lopez (PHI); D 0.5–0.5	Kutwal (IND); W 1–0	4.5	3rd place, bronze medalist(s)
Henry Roger Lopez	Men's Individual Rapid P1	Kutwal (IND); W 1–0	Arigala (IND); W 1–0	Kuchibhotla (IND); W 1–0	Severino (PHI); L 0–1	Firdaus (INA); W 1–0	Rom (PHI); D 0.5–0.5	Sutikno (INA); D 0.5–0.5	5.0	2nd place, silver medalist(s)
Minandro Redor	Men's Individual Standard VI - B2/B3	Hartono (INA); D 0.5–0.5	Satrio (INA); D 0.5–0.5	Makwana (IND); W 1–0	Subaste (PHI); D 0.5–0.5	Karimi (IRI); D 0.5–0.5	Gangolli (IND); W 1–0	Maklushov (IND); W 1–0	5.0	2nd place, silver medalist(s)
Israel Peligro	Men's Individual Standard VI - B2/B3	Satrio (INA); W 1–0	Karimi (IRI); L 0–1	Bagheri (IRI); L 0–1	Pradhan (IND); D 0.5–0.5	Haryanto (INA); W 1–0	Ghoorchibeygi (IRI); W 1–0	Subaste (PHI); L 0–1	3.5	–
Arman Subaste	Men's Individual Standard VI - B2/B3	Cassim (SRI); W 1–0	Gangolli (IND); D 0.5–0.5	Maklushov (IND); D 0.5–0.5	Redor (PHI); D 0.5–0.5	Hartono (INA); W 1–0	Makwana (IND); L 0–1	Peligro (PHI); W 1–0	4.5	3rd place, bronze medalist(s)
Minandro Redor	Men's Individual Rapid VI - B2/B3	Hartono (INA); D 0.5–0.5	Ghoorchibeygi (IRI); W 1–0	Karimi (IRI); D 0.5–0.5	Satrio (INA); L 0–1	Pradhan (IND); W 1–0	Gangolli (IND); D 0.5–0.5	Subaste (PHI); L 0–1	3.5	–
Israel Peligro	Men's Individual Rapid VI - B2/B3	Bagheri (IRI); L 0–1	Maklushov (IND); L 0–1	Cassim (SRI); W 1–0	Makwana (IND); L 0–1	Haryanto (INA); L 0–1	Pradhan (IND); L 0–1	Ghoorchibeygi (IRI); L 0–1	1.0	–
Arman Subaste	Men's Individual Rapid VI - B2/B3	Cassim (SRI); W 1–0	Satrio (INA); W 1–0	Gangolli (IND); L 0–1	Karimi (IRI); D 0.5–0.5	Bagheri (IRI); D 0.5–0.5	Haryanto (INA); W 1–0	Redor (PHI); W 1–0	5.0	3rd place, bronze medalist(s)
Francis Ching	Men's Individual Standard VI - B1	Nguyen (VIE); W 1–0	Sarmiento (PHI); W 1–0	Pradhan (IND); D 0.5–0.5	Suryanto (INA); D 0.5–0.5	Carsidi (INA); W 1–0	Wirawan (INA); W 1–0	Kaung San (MYA); L 0–1	5.0	–
Rodolfo Sarmiento	Men's Individual Standard VI - B1	Amandio (TLS); W 1–0	Ching (PHI); L 0–1	Nguyen (VIE); L 0–1	Dao (VIE); L 0–1	Yapa (SRI); W 1–0	Than Htay (MYA); W 1–0	Suryanto (INA); L 0–1	3.0	–
Cecilio Bilog	Men's Individual Standard VI - B1	Ghadiri (IRI); W 1–0	Wirawan (INA); L 0–1	Kabyzhanov (KAZ); L 0–1	Yapa (SRI); W 1–0	Dao (VIE); L 0–1	Nguyen (VIE); L 0–1	Savio (TLS); W 1–0	3.0	–
Francis Ching	Men's Individual Rapid VI - B1	Nguyen (VIE); W 1–0	Mohammad (IRI); D 0.5–0.5	Than Htay (MYA); W 1–0	Carsidi (INA); W 1–0	Suryanto (INA); L 0–1	Kabyzhanov (KAZ); L 0–1	Sarmiento (PHI); W 1–0	4.5	–
Rodolfo Sarmiento	Men's Individual Rapid VI - B1	Amandio (TLS); W 1–0	Ghadiri (IRI); W 1–0	Kabyzhanov (KAZ) –	Pradhan (IND); L 0–1	Myo San Aung (MYA); D 0.5–0.5	Mohammad (IRI); W 1–0	Ching (PHI); L 0–1	3.5	–
Cecilio Bilog	Men's Individual Rapid VI - B1	Ghadiri (IRI); L 0–1	Amandio (TLS); W 1–0	Pay (IND); L 0–1	Nguyen (VIE); W 1–0	Roumifard (IRI); W 1–0	Kaung San (MYA); L 0–1	Dao (VIE); L 0–1	3.0	–
Sander Severino; Jasper Rom; Henry Roger Lopez	Men's Team Standard P1	N/A							14.0	1st place, gold medalist(s)
Sander Severino; Jasper Rom; Henry Roger Lopez	Men's Team Rapid P1	N/A							16.0	1st place, gold medalist(s)
Minandro Redor; Israel Peligro; Arman Subaste	Men's Team Standard VI - B2/B3	N/A							14.0	1st place, gold medalist(s)
Minandro Redor; Israel Peligro; Arman Subaste	Men's Team Rapid VI - B2/B3	N/A							9.5	3rd place, bronze medalist(s)
Francis Ching; Rodolfo Sarmiento; Cecilio Bilog	Men's Team Standard VI - B2/B3	N/A							11.0	–
Francis Ching; Rodolfo Sarmiento; Cecilio Bilog	Men's Team Rapid VI - B2/B3	N/A							11.0	3rd place, bronze medalist(s)

Women

Athlete	Event	Round 1	Round 2	Round 3	Round 4	Round 5	Round 6	Round 7	Final Score	Rank
Cheryl Angot	Women's Individual Standard P1	Kanickai (IND); L 0–1	Nacita (PHI); W 1–0	Raju (IND); D 0.5–0.5	Doan (VIE); L 0–1	N/A	Simanja (INA); L 0–1	Mangayayam (PHI); W 1–0	2.5	–
Fe Mangayayam	Women's Individual Standard P1	Tran (VIE); L 0–1	Manurung (INA); L 0–1	N/A	Yuni (INA); L 0–1	Nacita (PHI); L 0–1	Raju (IND); W 1–0	Angot (PHI); L 0–1	1.0	–
Jean-lee Nacita	Women's Individual Standard P1	Doan (VIE); L 0–1	Angot (PHI); L 0–1	Nguyen Thi Khieu (VIE); L 0–1	N/A	Mangayayam (PHI); W 1–0	Yuni (INA); L 0–1	Raju (IND); W 1–0	2.0	–
Cheryl Angot	Women's Individual Rapid P1	Kanickai (IND); L 0–1	Nacita (PHI); W 1–0	Mangayayam (PHI); W 1–0	Manurung (INA); W 1–0	Doan (VIE); L 0–1	Raju (IND); L 0–1	N/A	3.0	–
Fe Mangayayam	Women's Individual Rapid P1	Tran (VIE); L 0–1	Manurung (INA); L 0–1	Angot (PHI); L 0–1	N/A	Raju (IND); L 0–1	Nacita (PHI); W 1–0	Simanja (INA); L 0–1	1.0	–
Jean-lee Nacita	Women's Individual Rapid P1	Doan (VIE); L 0–1	Angot (PHI); L 0–1	N/A	Yuni (INA); L 0–1	Manurung (INA); L 0–1	Mangayayam (PHI); L 0–1	Raju (IND); W 1–0	1.0	–
Cheryl Angot; Fe Mangayayam; Jean-lee Nacita	Women's Team Standard P1	N/A							5.5	–
Cheryl Angot; Fe Mangayayam; Jean-lee Nacita	Women's Team Rapid P1	N/A							5.0	–

== Cycling ==
Two cyclers was entered to compete for the Philippines.

=== Track ===
Time Trial

Athlete	Event	Results	
Athlete	Event	Time	Rank
Arthus Bucay	Men's Time Trial C5	28:39.210	3rd place, bronze medalist(s)
Godfrey Taberna	Men's Time Trial C4	30:38.534	4

== Judo ==
The Philippines has entered three judokas.

Athlete	Event	Round of 16	Quarter Final	Semi Final	Final	Rank
Athlete	Event	Opposition Result	Opposition Result	Opposition Result	Opposition Result	Rank
Deterson Omas	Men's -60 kg		Did not advance			
Gener Padilla	Men's -73 kg	Bye	Shamey (KAZ); L	Enkhtuya (MGL); L	Did not advance	
Carlito Agustin	Men's -81 kg	Bye	Omid (IRI); L	Tashekenov (KAZ); L	Did not advance	

== Powerlifting ==
Five powerlifters will compete in the games.

Men

Athlete	Event	Result	Rank
Agustin Kitan	-54 kg	NL	7
Romeo Tayawa	-49 kg	114	7

Women

Athlete	Event	Result	Rank
Marydol Pamatian	-41kg	65	5
Achelle Guion	-45kg	67	2nd place, silver medalist(s)
Adeline Dumapong-Ancheta	+86 kg	107	3rd place, bronze medalist(s)

== Swimming ==
Five swimmers were entered for the games.

- Ernie Gawilan
- Gary Bejino
- Roland Subido
- Arnel Aba
- Edwin Villanueva

== Table tennis ==
The Philippines has entered six table tennis players.

- Minnie Cadag
- Benedicto Gaela
- Pablo Catalan
- Darwin Salvacion
- Smith Billy Cartera
- Josephine Medina

== Ten pin bowling ==
Ten bowlers were entered for the games. Kim Ian Chi won a gold in the mixed singles TPB10 event.

- Kim Ian Chi
- Samuel Matias
- Angelito Guloya
- Christopher Yue
- Francisco Ednaco
- Jaime Manginga
- Augusto Hernandez
- Crisostomo Yao
- Noel Espanol
- Ruben San Diego

== See also ==
- Philippines at the 2018 Asian Games
