= Swimming at the 2018 Asian Para Games =

Paralympic swimming at the 2018 Asian Para Games
- Venue: Gelora Bung Karno Aquatic Stadium
- Location: Jakarta, Indonesia
- Dates: 7–12 October

Paralympic swimming at the 2018 Asian Para Games was held from 7 to 12 October 2018 at the Gelora Bung Karno Aquatic Stadium.

== Medal summary ==
=== Medal table ===
* Host nation (Indonesia)

Rank	NPC	Gold	Silver	Bronze	Total
1	China (CHN)	39	24	12	75
2	Japan (JPN)	22	28	29	79
3	Uzbekistan (UZB)	15	13	6	34
4	Iran (IRI)	6	1	1	8
5	Kazakhstan (KAZ)	5	9	6	20
6	Vietnam (VIE)	4	3	9	16
7	Indonesia (INA)*	3	4	5	12
8	Philippines (PHI)	3	3	2	8
9	Hong Kong (HKG)	3	2	1	6
10	Singapore (SGP)	3	0	3	6
11	South Korea (KOR)	1	5	5	11
12	Malaysia (MAS)	1	3	5	9
13	India (IND)	1	2	5	8
14	Thailand (THA)	0	4	12	16
15	Myanmar (MYA)	0	2	2	4
16	Chinese Taipei (TPE)	0	2	0	2
17	Iraq (IRQ)	0	0	1	1
17	Korea (COR)	0	0	1	1
Totals (18 entries)		106	105	105	316

=== Men's events ===
Event	Class	Gold	Silver	Bronze
50 m freestyle	S4 (1–4)	Takayuki Suzuki; Japan	Jo Gi-seong; South Korea	Zou Liankang; China
100 m freestyle	S4 (1–4)	Takayuki Suzuki; Japan	Jo Gi-seong; South Korea	Zou Liankang; China
200 m freestyle	S4 (1–4)	Takayuki Suzuki; Japan	Jo Gi-seong; South Korea	Zou Liankang; China
50 m backstroke	S4 (1–4)	Zou Liankang; China	Charkorn Kaewsri; Thailand	Hà Văn Hiệp; Vietnam
50 m breaststroke	SB3 (1–3)	Takayuki Suzuki; Japan	Hà Văn Hiệp; Vietnam	Charkorn Kaewsri; Thailand
50 m freestyle	S5	Muhammad Nur Syaiful Zulkafli; Malaysia	Võ Thanh Tùng; Vietnam	Li Junsheng; China
100 m freestyle	S5	Võ Thanh Tùng; Vietnam	Muhammad Nur Syaiful Zulkafli; Malaysia	Qasim al-Khafaji; Iraq
200 m freestyle	S5	Võ Thanh Tùng; Vietnam	Muhammad Nur Syaiful Zulkafli; Malaysia	Jamery Siga; Malaysia
50 m backstroke	S5	Võ Thanh Tùng; Vietnam	Kyaw Htoo; Myanmar	Siyazbek Daliev; Kazakhstan
50 m butterfly	S5 (2–5)	Siyazbek Daliev; Kazakhstan	Võ Thanh Tùng; Vietnam	Jamery Siga; Malaysia
100 m breaststroke	SB4	Nguyễn Thành Trung; Vietnam GR	Voravit Kaewkham; Thailand	Anderson Jamba; Malaysia
50 m freestyle	S6	Yerzhan Salimgereyev; Kazakhstan	Yang Hong; China	Aung Myint Myat; Myanmar
100 m freestyle	S6	Yerzhan Salimgereyev; Kazakhstan	Yang Hong; China	Gary Bejino; Philippines
100 m backstroke	S6	Yang Hong; China	Aung Myint Myat; Myanmar	Gary Bejino; Philippines
200 m individual medley	SM6 (5–6)	Yang Hong; China	Gary Bejino; Philippines	Đỗ Thanh Hải; Vietnam
50 m freestyle	S7	Toh Wei Soong; Singapore	Ernie Gawilan; Philippines	Suyash Jadhav; India
100 m freestyle	S7	Toh Wei Soong; Singapore	Ernie Gawilan; Philippines	Lee Dong-gu; South Korea
400 m freestyle	S7 (6–7)	Ernie Gawilan; Philippines	Chen Liang-da; Chinese Taipei	Jeon Ga-eul; South Korea
100 m backstroke	S7	Daisuke Ejima; Japan	not awarded as there was a tie for gold.	Toh Wei Soong; Singapore
100 m backstroke	S7	Ernie Gawilan; Philippines	not awarded as there was a tie for gold.	Toh Wei Soong; Singapore
50 m butterfly	S7 (6–7)	Suyash Jadhav; India	Yang Hong; China	Boonyarit Payungsakul; Thailand
100 m breaststroke	SB6 (5–6)	Yang Hong; China	Tomotaro Nakamura; Japan	Aung Nyein Oo; Myanmar
200 m individual medley	SM7	Ernie Gawilan; Philippines	Chen Liang-da; Chinese Taipei	Suyash Jadhav; India
50 m freestyle	S8	Xu Haijiao; China	Yang Guanglong; China	Kota Kubota; Japan
100 m freestyle	S8	Xu Haijiao; China	Yang Guanglong; China	Kotaro Ogiwara; Japan
400 m freestyle	S8	Xu Haijiao; China	Yang Guanglong; China	Võ Huỳnh Anh Khoa; Vietnam
100 m backstroke	S8	Yang Guanglong; China	Kota Kubota; Japan	Qi Yehai; China
100 m butterfly	S8	Yang Guanglong; China	Xu Haijiao; China	Kotaro Ogiwara; Japan
100 m breaststroke	SB7	Huang Xianquan; China	Aris Wibawa; Indonesia	Lê Tiến Đạt; Vietnam
200 m individual medley	SM8	Xu Haijiao; China	Huang Xianquan; China	James Wong Tien Yu; Malaysia
50 m freestyle	S9	Takuro Yamada; Japan	Luo Qingquan; China	Daiki Kubo; Japan
100 m freestyle	S9	Takuro Yamada; Japan	Daiki Kubo; Japan	Jendi Pangabean; Indonesia
400 m freestyle	S9	Kwon Hyun; South Korea	Luo Qingquan; China	Jeon Hyung-woo; South Korea
100 m backstroke	S9	Jendi Pangabean; Indonesia	Luo Qingquan; China	Kwon Yong-hwa; South Korea
100 m butterfly	S9	Daiki Kubo; Japan	Jendi Pangabean; Indonesia	Luo Qingquan; China
100 m breaststroke	SB8	Xu Haijiao; China	Guntur; Indonesia	Zaki Zulkarnain; Indonesia
200 m individual medley	SM9	Takuro Yamada; Japan	Luo Qingquan; China	Daiki Kubo; Japan
50 m freestyle	S10	Shahin Izadyar; Iran	Sergey Kinakh; Kazakhstan	Dmitriy Li; Kazakhstan
100 m freestyle	S10	Shahin Izadyar; Iran	Dmitriy Li; Kazakhstan	Swapnil Sanjay Patil; India
400 m freestyle	S10	Dmitriy Li; Kazakhstan	Shahin Izadyar; Iran	Swapnil Sanjay Patil; India
100 m backstroke	S10	Shahin Izadyar; Iran	Swapnil Sanjay Patil; India	Tangkilisan Steven Sualang; Indonesia
100 m butterfly	S10	Shahin Izadyar; Iran	Fraidden Dawan; Malaysia	Dmitriy Li; Kazakhstan
100 m breaststroke	SB9	Shahin Izadyar; Iran	Sergey Kinakh; Kazakhstan	Daiki Kubo; Japan
200 m individual medley	SM10	Shahin Izadyar; Iran	Dmitriy Li; Kazakhstan	Fraidden Dawan; Malaysia
50 m freestyle	S11	Keiichi Kimura; Japan	Uchu Tomita; Japan	Thanongsak Hitakun; Thailand
100 m freestyle	S11	Uchu Tomita; Japan GR	Keiichi Kimura; Japan	Mansurbek Ibrashev; Kazakhstan
100 m backstroke	S11	Keiichi Kimura; Japan	Mansurbek Ibrashev; Kazakhstan	Thanongsak Hitakun; Thailand
100 m breaststroke	SB11	Keiichi Kimura; Japan	Panom Lagsanaprim; Thailand	Kritaphat Witidkasemrot; Thailand
200 m individual medley	SM11	Keiichi Kimura; Japan	Uchu Tomita; Japan	Panom Lagsanaprim; Thailand
50 m freestyle	S12	Dmitriy Horlin; Uzbekistan	Anuar Akhmetov; Kazakhstan	Mohammadhossein Karimi; Iran
50 m freestyle	S13	Islam Aslanov; Uzbekistan	Muzaffar Tursunkhujaev; Uzbekistan	Ryo Nagano; Japan
100 m freestyle	S13 (12–13)	Islam Aslanov; Uzbekistan	Muzaffar Tursunkhujaev; Uzbekistan	Dmitriy Horlin; Uzbekistan
400 m freestyle	S13 (11–13)	Dmitriy Horlin; Uzbekistan AR	Islam Aslanov; Uzbekistan	Genki Saito; Japan
100 m backstroke	S13 (12–13)	Kirill Pankov; Uzbekistan	Muzaffar Tursunkhujaev; Uzbekistan	Genki Saito; Japan
100 m butterfly	S13 (11–13)	Islam Aslanov; Uzbekistan	Kirill Pankov; Uzbekistan	Dmitriy Horlin; Uzbekistan
100 m breaststroke	SB13 (12–13)	Firdavsbek Musabekov; Uzbekistan	Anuar Akhmetov; Kazakhstan	Islam Aslanov; Uzbekistan
200 m individual medley	SM13 (12–13)	Dmitriy Horlin; Uzbekistan	Firdavsbek Musabekov; Uzbekistan	Genki Saito; Japan
200 m freestyle	S14	Tang Wai-lok; Hong Kong GR	Cho Won-sang; South Korea	Keichi Nakajima; Japan
100 m backstroke	S14	Hui Ka Chun; Hong Kong	Keichi Nakajima; Japan	Takuya Tsugawa; Japan
100 m butterfly	S14	Dai Tokairin; Japan	Keichi Nakajima; Japan	Cho Won-sang; South Korea
100 m breaststroke	SB14	Yasuhiro Tanaka; Japan	Dai Tokairin; Japan	Taiga Hayashida; Japan
200 m individual medley	SM14	Dai Tokairin; Japan	Tang Wai-lok; Hong Kong	Keichi Nakajima; Japan
4 × 100 m freestyle relay	34 points	Japan; Daiki Kubo; Kota Kubota; Kotaro Ogiwara; Takuro Yamada	China; Huang Xianquan; Luo Qingquan; Xu Haijiao; Yang Guanglong	Korea; Kim Sae-hun; Kwon Hyun; Kwon Yong-hwa; Lee Dong-gu
4 × 100 m medley relay	34 points	China; Luo Qingquan; Qi Yehai; Xu Haijiao; Yang Guanglong	Japan; Daiki Kubo; Kota Kubota; Kotaro Ogiwara; Takuro Yamada	Indonesia; Guntur; Jendi Pangabean; Tangkilisan Steven Sualang; Suriansyah

=== Women's events ===
Event	Class	Gold	Silver	Bronze
50 m freestyle	S4 (1–4)	Peng Qiuping; China	Zulfiya Gabidullina; Kazakhstan	Yip Pin Xiu; Singapore
100 m freestyle	S4 (1–4)	Zulfiya Gabidullina; Kazakhstan	Peng Qiuping; China	Yip Pin Xiu; Singapore
50 m backstroke	S4 (1–4)	Yip Pin Xiu; Singapore	Zulfiya Gabidullina; Kazakhstan	Feng Yazhu; China
50 m freestyle	S5	Yao Cuan; China	Mayumi Narita; Japan	Cheng Jiao; China
100 m freestyle	S5	Yao Cuan; China	Mayumi Narita; Japan	Cheng Jiao; China
200 m freestyle	S5 (1–5)	Yao Cuan; China	Mayumi Narita; Japan	Zulfiya Gabidullina; Kazakhstan
50 m freestyle	S6	Jiang Yuyan; China	Song Lingling; China	Trịnh Thị Bích Như; Vietnam
100 m freestyle	S6	Jiang Yuyan; China	Song Lingling; China	Trịnh Thị Bích Như; Vietnam
50 m freestyle	S7	Ke Liting; China	Sakura Koike; Japan	Vi Thị Hằng; Vietnam
100 m freestyle	S7	Ke Liting; China	Sakura Koike; Japan	Vi Thị Hằng; Vietnam
400 m freestyle	S7 (6–7)	Song Lingling; China	Jiang Yuyan; China	Sakura Koike; Japan
50 m butterfly	S7 (2–7)	Jiang Yuyan; China	Ke Liting; China	Trịnh Thị Bích Như; Vietnam
100 m breaststroke	SB6 (4–6)	Song Lingling; China	Sakura Koike; Japan	Ke Liting; China
100 m freestyle	S8	Zheng Tingting; China	Mai Mizukami; Japan	Alina Dubinina; Kazakhstan
100 m backstroke	S8 (6–8)	Song Lingling; China	Ke Liting; China	Zheng Tingting; China
50 m freestyle	S9 (8–9)	Xu Jialing; China	Mei Ichinose; Japan	Anchaya Ketkeaw; Thailand
100 m freestyle	S9	Xu Jialing; China	Mei Ichinose; Japan	Anchaya Ketkeaw; Thailand
100 m backstroke	S9	Xu Jialing; China	Anchaya Ketkeaw; Thailand	Mei Ichinose; Japan
100 m butterfly	S9 (8–9)	Xu Jialing; China	Mei Ichinose; Japan	Yuki Morishita; Japan
100 m breaststroke	SB8 (7–8)	Mikuni Utsugi; Japan	Xu Jialing; China	Chen Yawen; China
200 m individual medley	SM9 (5–9)	Xu Jialing; China	Mei Ichinose; Japan	Mikuni Utsugi; Japan
100 m freestyle	S10	Chen Yi; China	Airi Ike; Japan	Devanshi Satija; India
400 m freestyle	S10 (8–10)	Chen Yi; China	Xu Jialing; China	Airi Ike; Japan
100 m butterfly	S10	Airi Ike; Japan	Devanshi Satija; India	Monruedee Kangpila; Thailand
100 m breaststroke	SB9	Chen Yi; China	Airi Ike; Japan	Mei Ichinose; Japan
200 m individual medley	SM10	Chen Yi; China	Airi Ike; Japan	Monruedee Kangpila; Thailand
100 m freestyle	S11	Cai Liwen; China	Zhang Xiaotong; China	Chikako Ono; Japan
200 m individual medley	SM11	Zhang Xiaotong; China	Cai Liwen; China	Chikako Ono; Japan
50 m freestyle	S13 (11–13)	Fotimakhon Amilova; Uzbekistan	Shokhsanamkhon Toshpulatova; Uzbekistan	Ayano Tsujiuchi; Japan
100 m freestyle	S13 (12–13)	Fotimakhon Amilova; Uzbekistan	Shokhsanamkhon Toshpulatova; Uzbekistan	Ayano Tsujiuchi; Japan
400 m freestyle	S13	Shokhsanamkhon Toshpulatova; Uzbekistan AR	Fotimakhon Amilova; Uzbekistan	Ayano Tsujiuchi; Japan
100 m backstroke	S13 (11–13)	Shokhsanamkhon Toshpulatova; Uzbekistan	Nigorakhon Mirzokhidova; Uzbekistan	Fotimakhon Amilova; Uzbekistan
100 m butterfly	S13 (11–13)	Shokhsanamkhon Toshpulatova; Uzbekistan	Fotimakhon Amilova; Uzbekistan	Nigorakhon Mirzokhidova; Uzbekistan
100 m breaststroke	SB13 (12–13)	Fotimakhon Amilova; Uzbekistan	Shokhsanamkhon Toshpulatova; Uzbekistan	Nigorakhon Mirzokhidova; Uzbekistan
200 m individual medley	SM13 (12–13)	Fotimakhon Amilova; Uzbekistan	Shokhsanamkhon Toshpulatova; Uzbekistan	Ayano Tsujiuchi; Japan
200 m freestyle	S14	Amisa Kitano; Japan	Mami Inoue; Japan	Syuci Indriani; Indonesia
100 m backstroke	S14	Kasumi Fukui; Japan	Kang Jung-eun; South Korea	Chan Yui-lam; Hong Kong
100 m butterfly	S14	Chan Yui-lam; Hong Kong	Syuci Indriani; Indonesia	Mami Inoue; Japan
100 m breaststroke	SB14	Syuci Indriani; Indonesia	Mai Deguchi; Japan	Mikika Serizawa; Japan
200 m individual medley	SM14	Syuci Indriani; Indonesia	Chan Yui-lam; Hong Kong	Mami Inoue; Japan
4 × 100 m freestyle relay	34 points	China; Chen Yi; Song Lingling; Xu Jialing; Zheng Tingting	Japan; Mei Ichinose; Airi Ike; Yuki Morishita; Erika Nara	Thailand; Prakaithip Chaiwong; Anchaya Ketkeaw; Surerut Komkeaw; Pattra Krangphanit
4 × 100 m medley relay	34 points	China; Chen Yawen; Chen Yi; Song Lingling; Xu Jialing	Japan; Mei Ichinose; Airi Ike; Sakura Koike; Mikuni Utsugi	Thailand; Thongbai Chaisawas; Monruedee Kangpila; Anchaya Ketkeaw; Surerut Komkeaw

=== Mixed events ===
Event	Class	Gold	Silver	Bronze
4 × 50 m freestyle relay	20 points	Japan; Tomotaro Nakamura; Erika Nara; Mayumi Narita; Takayuki Suzuki	China; Peng Qiuping; Xu Haijiao; Yao Cuan; Zou Liankang	not awarded

== Non-medal events ==
- Men's 100m Backstroke S1-2
- Women's 100m Backstroke S1-2
- Women's 50m Backstroke S5
- Men's 150m Individual Medley SM4 (1-4)
- Women's 50m Freestyle S10
- Women's 150m Individual Medley SM4 (1-4)
- Mixed 4X100m Freestyle Relay 49 Points
- Women's 50m Breaststroke SB3 (1-3)
- Women's 100m Backstroke S10
- Mixed 4X100m Freestyle Relay S14

== See also ==
- Swimming at the 2017 ASEAN Para Games
- Swimming at the 2018 Asian Games
