= Hong Kong at the 2018 Asian Para Games =

- IPC code: HKG
- NPC: Hong Kong Paralympic Committee & Sports Association for the Physically Disabled
- Website: www.hkparalympic.org

in Jakarta 6–13 October 2018
- Competitors: 101 in 10 sports
- Flag bearer: Yu Chui Yee
- Medals Ranked 10th: Gold 11 Silver 16 Bronze 21 Total 48

Asian Para Games appearances (overview)
- 2010; 2014; 2018; 2022

Hong Kong participated at the 2018 Asian Para Games which was held in Jakarta, Indonesia from 6 to 13 October 2018.

The Hong Kong delegation was composed of 101 athletes who participated in 10 out of 18 sports in the games which were Archery, Athletics, Badminton, Boccia, Bowling, Lawn bowls, Table tennis, Shooting, Swimming, and Wheelchair fencing, with Ng Chak Lin served as the head of the delegation.

These were the last games contested by Hong Kong under the Hong Kong Paralympic Committee and Sports Association for the Physically Disabled umbrella, before the organisation separated into two independent entities namely the Hong Kong Paralympic Committee and Hong Kong Sports Association for the Physically Disabled on 1 April 2022.

== Medalists ==
Medal	Name	Sport	Event	Date
Gold	Tang Wai Lok	Swimming	Men's 200m Freestyle S14	07 Oct
Gold	Yu Chui Yee	Wheelchair fencing	Women Foil - Category A	07 Oct
Gold	Tang Shun Yee	Lawn bowls	B3 Open Single's - Mixed	08 Oct
Gold	Ng Mui Wui	Table tennis	Women's Singles- TT 11	08 Oct
Gold	Hui Ka Chun	Swimming	Men's 100m Backstroke S14	09 Oct
Gold	Chan Yui-lam	Swimming	Women's 100m Butterfly S14	10 Oct
Gold	Chu Man Kai	Badminton	Men’s Singles SS6	12 Oct
Gold	Ho Yuen Kei; Tsang Ling Yan; Tse Tak Wah	Boccia	Mixed Pairs BC3	12 Oct
Gold	Tang Shun Yee; Kwok Wing	Lawn bowls	Mixed Pairs B4	12 Oct
Gold	Tang Mei Yi; Li Ying Wing	Lawn bowls	Mixed Pairs B8	12 Oct
Gold	Ng Mui Wui; Wong Ka Man; Li Hiu Tung	Table tennis	Women's Team- TT 11	12 Oct
Silver	Cheong Meng Chai	Wheelchair fencing	Men Foil - Category A	07 Oct
Silver	Kwok Wing	Lawn bowls	B4 Open Single's - Mixed	08 Oct
Silver	Wu Man Ying	Lawn bowls	Women's Singles B7	08 Oct
Silver	Fan Pui Shan; Chung Yuen Ping; Yu Chui Yee; Justine Charissa Ng	Wheelchair fencing	Team Women - Foil	08 Oct
Silver	Li Chi Ming Rockey	Lawn bowls	B2 Open Single's - Mixed	09 Oct
Silver	Wong Mei Lan	Bowling	Women's Singles TPB8	09 Oct
Silver	Yu Chun Lai	Athletics	Women's 100m T36	10 Oct
Silver	Ko Hang Yee; Choi Siu Hung	Table tennis	Men's Double- TT 2-3	10 Oct
Silver	Lee Ming Yip; Chen Si Lu	Table tennis	Men's Double- TT 6-7	10 Oct
Silver	Justine Charissa Ng; Tong Nga Ting; Yu Chui Yee; Fan Pui Shan	Wheelchair fencing	Team Women - Epee	11 Oct
Silver	Yeung Hiu Lam; Kwok Hoi Ying Karen; Leung Mei Yee; Loung John; Chan Kam Chau	Boccia	Mixed Team BC1/BC2	12 Oct
Silver	Yim Man Ching; Li Chi Ming Rockey	Lawn bowls	Mixed Pairs B2	12 Oct
Silver	Tang Wai Lok	Swimming	Men's 200m Individual Medley SM14	12 Oct
Silver	Chan Yui-lam	Swimming	Women's 200m Individual Medley SM14	12 Oct
Silver	Wan Wai Lok; Leung Chung Yan; Tsoi Ming Fai	Table tennis	Men's Team- TT 11	12 Oct
Silver	Chan Ho Yuen	Badminton	Men's Singles WH2	13 Oct
Bronze	Tang Mei Yi	Lawn bowls	Women's Singles B8	07 Oct
Bronze	Justine Charissa Ng	Wheelchair fencing	Women Foil - Category A	07 Oct
Bronze	Chung Yuen Ping	Wheelchair fencing	Women Foil - Category B	07 Oct
Bronze	Yam Kwok Fan	Athletics	Women's 200m T36	08 Oct
Bronze	Yuen Wing Shan	Bowling	Women's Singles TPB3	08 Oct
Bronze	Ko Hang Yee	Table tennis	Men's Singles- TT 3	08 Oct
Bronze	Wong Ka Man	Table tennis	Women's Singles- TT 11	08 Oct
Bronze	Yim Man Ching	Lawn bowls	B2 Open Single's - Mixed	09 Oct
Bronze	Chan Yui-lam	Swimming	Women's 100m Backstroke S14	09 Oct
Bronze	Wong Chi Yin	Table tennis	Men's Singles- TT 9	09 Oct
Bronze	Wong Pui Yi	Table tennis	Women's Singles- TT 5	09 Oct
Bronze	Chiu Kan Shan	Table tennis	Women's Singles- TT 7	09 Oct
Bronze	Chan Wing Kin	Wheelchair fencing	Men Sabre - Category A	09 Oct
Bronze	Cheong Meng Chai	Wheelchair fencing	Men Sabre - Category A	09 Oct
Bronze	Yu Chui Yee	Wheelchair fencing	Women Sabre - Category A	09 Oct
Bronze	Ho Yuen Kei	Boccia	Mixed Individual-BC3	10 Oct
Bronze	Yeung Hiu Lam	Boccia	Mixed Individual-BC2	10 Oct
Bronze	Yu Chui Yee	Wheelchair fencing	Women Epee - Category A	10 Oct
Bronze	Tong Nga Ting	Wheelchair fencing	Women Epee - Category B	10 Oct
Bronze	Wong Chun Yim	Badminton	Men’s Singles SS6	12 Oct
Bronze	Lam Tsz Huen	Badminton	Women's Singles SU5	12 Oct

== Medals by sport ==
Medals by sport
Sport	1st place, gold medalist(s)	2nd place, silver medalist(s)	3rd place, bronze medalist(s)	Total
Athletics	0	1	1	2
Badminton	1	1	2	4
Boccia	1	1	2	4
Bowling	0	1	1	2
Lawn bowls	3	4	2	9
Swimming	3	2	1	6
Table tennis	2	3	5	10
Wheelchair fencing	1	3	7	11
Total	11	16	21	48

== Medals by day ==
Medals by day
Day	Date	1st place, gold medalist(s)	2nd place, silver medalist(s)	3rd place, bronze medalist(s)	Total
1	October 7	2	1	3	6
2	October 8	2	3	4	9
3	October 9	1	2	8	11
4	October 10	1	3	4	8
5	October 11	0	1	0	1
6	October 12	5	5	2	12
7	October 13	0	1	0	1
Total		11	16	21	48

== See also ==
- Hong Kong at the 2018 Asian Games
