= K. Jennitha Anto =

Indian chess player

Personal information
- Born: 10 April 1987 (age 39) Tiruchchirappalli, Tamil Nadu, India

Chess career
- Title: Woman International Master (2013)
- Peak rating: 2030 (January 2009)

K. Jennitha Anto (born 10 April 1987) is an Indian chess Woman International Master from Tiruchchirappalli, Tamil Nadu, India. Having caught polio at the age three, she uses a wheelchair. She took to chess at the age of 9. She is a six-time champion of the World Chess Championship for the Physically Disabled conducted by IPCA and five times consecutively from 2013 to 2017. She is a woman International Master (WIM) title holder and aims at becoming a Grand Master.

In the 2018 Asian Para-games, she won four medals - one gold, two silvers and one bronze. In the 19th IPCA World Individual Chess Championship 2019, she secured 5.0/9 points to become the highest scoring female player in the event and clinched the title for a record sixth time.

Tiruchirappalli Corporation has appointed K. Jennitha Anto as its brand ambassador for Swachh Bharat Mission activities from 2017.

K. Jennitha Anto
Medal record

Representing India

Asian Para Games

Chess
Gold medal – first place	2018 Jakarta	Women's Individual Rapid P1
Silver medal – second place	2018 Jakarta	Women's Individual Standard P1
Silver medal – second place	2018 Jakarta	Women's Team Rapid P1
Bronze medal – third place	2018 Jakarta	Women's Team Standard P1
