= Swimming at the 2016 Summer Paralympics – Women's 200 metre individual medley SM13 =

Association For Defence studies

Women's 200 metre individual medley SM13 at the XV Paralympic Games
- Venue: Olympic Aquatics Stadium
- Dates: 10 September 2016
- Competitors: 17 from 11 nations

Medalists
1st place, gold medalist(s)		Rebecca Meyers	United States
2nd place, silver medalist(s)		Fotimakhon Amilova	Uzbekistan
3rd place, bronze medalist(s)		Shokhsanamkhon Toshpulatova	Uzbekistan

The women's 200 metre individual medley SM13 event at the 2016 Paralympic Games took place on 10 September 2016, at the Olympic Aquatics Stadium. Three heats were held. The swimmers with the eight fastest times advanced to the final.

== Heats ==
=== Heat 1 ===
10:52 10 September 2016:

Rank	Lane	Name	Nationality	Time	Notes
1	4	Anna Stetsenko	Ukraine	2:31.96	Q
2	5	Ariadna Edo Beltran	Spain	2:38.29	Q
3	3	Prue Watt	Australia	2:40.48	Q
4	6	Marta Maria Gomez Battelli	Spain	2:45.84	
5	2	Alani Ferreira	South Africa	2:50.43	

=== Heat 2 ===
10:57 10 September 2016:

Rank	Lane	Name	Nationality	Time	Notes
1	5	Fotimakhon Amilova	Uzbekistan	2:24.43	WR Q
2	4	Shokhsanamkhon Toshpulatova	Uzbekistan	2:30.16	Q
3	3	Alessia Berra	Italy	2:36.39	Q
4	6	Marian Polo Lopez	Spain	2:41.19	
5	7	Anastasiya Zudzilava	Belarus	2:44.78	
6	2	Karina Petrikovicova	Slovakia	2:47.24	

=== Heat 3 ===
11:02 10 September 2016:

Rank	Lane	Name	Nationality	Time	Notes
1	4	Rebecca Meyers	United States	2:29.88	Q
2	5	Colleen Young	United States	2:32.75	Q
3	3	Elena Krawzow	Germany	2:40.51	
4	6	Martha Ruether	United States	2:40.83	
5	2	Jenna Jones	Australia	2:41.55	
6	7	Akari Kasamoto	Japan	2:56.20	

== Final ==
19:02 10 September 2016:

Rank	Lane	Name	Nationality	Time	Notes
1st place, gold medalist(s)	5	Rebecca Meyers	United States	2:24.66	
2nd place, silver medalist(s)	4	Fotimakhon Amilova	Uzbekistan	2:25.23	
3rd place, bronze medalist(s)	3	Shokhsanamkhon Toshpulatova	Uzbekistan	2:27.31	
4	6	Anna Stetsenko	Ukraine	2:28.95	
5	2	Colleen Young	United States	2:30.85	
6	1	Ariadna Edo Beltran	Spain	2:36.45	
7	7	Alessia Berra	Italy	2:37.91	
8	8	Prue Watt	Australia	2:39.06	
