= Bowling at the 2018 Asian Para Games =

- Venue: Jaya Ancol Bowling Center
- Location: Jakarta, Indonesia
- Dates: 8–11 October

Ten-pin bowling at the 2018 Asian Para Games in Jakarta took place between 8 and 11 October 2018.

== Medal table ==
* Host nation (Indonesia)

Rank	NPC	Gold	Silver	Bronze	Total
1	South Korea (KOR)	12	7	3	22
2	Malaysia (MAS)	2	2	6	10
3	Chinese Taipei (TPE)	2	2	2	6
4	Indonesia (INA)*	1	1	0	2
4	Philippines (PHI)	1	1	0	2
6	Japan (JPN)	0	3	1	4
7	Hong Kong (HKG)	0	1	1	2
7	Singapore (SGP)	0	1	1	2
9	Thailand (THA)	0	0	5	5
Totals (9 entries)		18	18	19	55

== Medalists ==
=== Men ===
Event	Class	Gold	Silver	Bronze
Singles	TPB3	Lee Jae-youn; South Korea	Huang Yu-hsiao; Chinese Taipei	Mohd Rizal Hassan; Malaysia
Singles	TPB4	Oh Ban-seok; South Korea	Youk Kyeun-bum; South Korea	Abang Yahya Abang Azhar; Malaysia
Singles	TPB8	Shin Baek-ho; South Korea	Kwon Min-kyu; South Korea	Suphan Sinthusuwan; Thailand

=== Women ===
Event	Class	Gold	Silver	Bronze
Singles	TPB3	Choi Jae-yeon; South Korea	Akiko Morisawa; Japan	Yuen Wing Shan; Hong Kong
Singles	TPB4	Elsa Maris; Indonesia	Diane Neo Pei Lin; Singapore	Kim Yu-na; South Korea
Singles	TPB8	Lee Chia-chieh; Chinese Taipei	Wong Mei Lan; Hong Kong	Ruzila Mustafa; Malaysia

=== Mixed ===
Event	Class	Gold	Silver	Bronze
Singles	TPB1	Kim Jung-hoon; South Korea	Yang Hyun-kyung; South Korea	Kanju Mori; Japan
Singles	TPB2	Lee Kun-hye; South Korea	Koh Young-bae; South Korea	Boripat Chongvivatthatham; Thailand
Singles	TPB9	Abu Bakar Nyat; Malaysia	Mun Gyeong-ho; South Korea	Wong Kee Soon; Malaysia
Singles	TPB10	Kim Ian Chi; Philippines	Hong Won-ju; South Korea	Raiwin Phisitthanakul; Thailand
Singles	TPB10	Kim Ian Chi; Philippines	Hong Won-ju; South Korea	Tan Swang Hee; Singapore
Doubles	TPB1+TPB3	South Korea; Bae Jin-hyung; Kim Jung-hoon	Chinese Taipei; Chiu Wen-shen; Huang Yu-hsiao	Malaysia; Mohd Rizal Hassan; Muhammad Hairul Miran
Doubles	TPB2+TPB2	South Korea; Koh Young-bae; Lee Kun-hye	Japan; Kazumori Higa; Kazuaki Kobayashi	Chinese Taipei; Huang Tzu-hsuan; Shieh Tsung-han
Doubles	TPB4+TPB4	South Korea; Oh Ban-seok; Youk Kyeun-bum	Indonesia; Andrey Azward; Elsa Maris	Malaysia; Abang Yahya Abang Azhar; Nur Syazwani Marais
Doubles	TPB8+TPB8	South Korea; Kwon Min-kyu; Shin Baek-ho	Malaysia; Mohd Khairul Ishak; Zahidi Lamsah	Thailand; Chumchai Phongsakon; Supparat Ponmingmad
Doubles	TPB9+TPB9	South Korea; Min Jin-ho; Mun Gyeong-ho	Malaysia; Abu Bakar Nyat; Mohd Azrin Rahim	Chinese Taipei; Lu Tai-an; Yang Meng-chang
Doubles	TPB10+TPB10	South Korea; Hong Won-ju; Sim Jin-yong	Philippines; Kim Ian Chi; Samuel Matias	Thailand; Chaiwat Achatongkum; Raiwin Phisitthanakul
Trios	TPB1+TPB1/2+TPB2/3	Chinese Taipei; Chiu Wen-shen; Huang Yu-hsiao; Shieh Tsung-han	Japan; Masatoshi Kiyosugi; Kazuaki Kobayashi; Kanju Mori	South Korea; Lee Jae-youn; Lee Kun-hye; Oh Taek-geun
Trios	TPB8+TPB8/9+TPB9/10	Malaysia; Abu Bakar Nyat; Mohd Azrin Rahim; Zahidi Lamsah	South Korea; Hong Won-ju; Kwon Min-kyu; Min Jin-ho	South Korea; Mun Gyeong-ho; Shin Baek-ho; Sim Jin-yong

== See also ==
- Bowling at the 2018 Asian Games
