= Vietnam at the 2018 Asian Para Games =

- IPC code: VIE
- NPC: Vietnam Paralympic Association

in Jakarta 6–13 October 2018
- Competitors: 52 in 7 sports
- Medals Ranked 12th: Gold 8 Silver 8 Bronze 24 Total 40

Asian Para Games appearances (overview)
- 2010; 2014; 2018; 2022

Youth appearances
- 2009; 2013; 2017

Vietnam participated at the 2018 Asian Para Games held in Jakarta, Indonesia from 6 to 13 October 2018.

The Vietnamese delegation was composed of 75 people, 52 of which were athletes and 11 were trainers and medical workers. Vietnam participated in 7 sports namely; athletics, swimming, powerlifting, chess, badminton, table tennis and judo. Vietnam Paralympic Association vice president and general secretary Vu The Phiet served as head of the delegation.

== Medalists ==
Medal	Name	Sport	Event	Date
Gold	Nguyễn Thành Trung	Swimming	Men's 100m Breaststroke SB4	07 Oct
Gold	Nguyen Binh Ahn	Powerlifting	Men's 54kg	08 Oct
Gold	Dang Thi Linh Phuong	Powerlifting	Women's 50kg	08 Oct
Gold	Võ Thanh Tùng	Swimming	Men's 50m Backstroke S5	08 Oct
Gold	Vo Thanh Tung	Swimming	Men's 100m Freestyle S5	09 Oct
Gold	Vo Thanh Tung	Swimming	Men's 200m Freestyle S5	10 Oct
Gold	Nguyen Thi My Linh	Chess	Women's Individual Rapid VI - B2/B3	12 Oct
Gold	Doan Thu Huyen; Tran Thi Bich Thuy; Nguyen Thi Kieu	Chess	Women's Team Rapid VI - B2/B3	12 Oct
Silver	Chau Hoang Tuyet Loan	Powerlifting	Women's 55kg	08 Oct
Silver	Vo Thanh Tung	Swimming	Men's 50m Butterfly S5 (2-5)	09 Oct
Silver	Doan Thu Huyen; Tran Thi Bich Thuy; Nguyen Thi Kieu	Chess	Women's Team Standard P1	10 Oct
Silver	Nguyen Thi Minh Thu; Nguyen Thi My Linh; Nguyen Thi Hong Chau	Chess	Women's Team Standard VI - B2/B3	10 Oct
Silver	Pham Nguyen Khanh Minh	Athletics	Men's 400m T12	11 Oct
Silver	Vo Thanh Tung	Swimming	Men's 50m Freestyle S5	11 Oct
Silver	Doan Thu Huyen	Chess	Women's Individual Rapid P1	12 Oct
Silver	Ha Van Hiep	Swimming	Men's 50m Breaststroke SB3 (1-3)	12 Oct
Bronze	Vi Thi Hang	Swimming	Women's 50m Freestyle S7	07 Oct
Bronze	Pham Nguyen Khanh Minh	Athletics	Men's 200m T12	08 Oct
Bronze	Nguyen Van Phuc	Powerlifting	Men's 59kg	08 Oct
Bronze	Le Tien Dat	Swimming	Men's 100m Breaststroke SB7	08 Oct
Bronze	Vo Huynh Anh Khoa	Swimming	Men's 400m Freestyle S8	08 Oct
Bronze	Ha Van Hiep	Swimming	Men's 50m Backstroke S4 (1-4)	08 Oct
Bronze	Trịnh Thị Bích Như	Swimming	Women's 100m Freestyle S6	09 Oct
Bronze	Vi Thi Hang	Swimming	Women's 100m Freestyle S7	09 Oct
Bronze	Trịnh Thị Bích Như	Swimming	Women's 50m Butterfly S7 (2-7)	09 Oct
Bronze	Tran Van Nguyen	Athletics	Men's Shot Put F40	10 Oct
Bronze	Nguyen Thi Hai	Athletics	Women's Javelin Throw F57	10 Oct
Bronze	Dao Thi Le Xuan; Pham Thi Huong	Chess	Women's Team Standard VI - B1	10 Oct
Bronze	Trịnh Thị Bích Như	Swimming	Women's 50m Freestyle S6	10 Oct
Bronze	Nguyen Ngoc Hiep	Athletics	Men's 400m T11	11 Oct
Bronze	Tran Van Nguyen	Athletics	Men's Javelin Throw F40/41	11 Oct
Bronze	Kieu Minh Trung	Athletics	Men's Javelin Throw F55	12 Oct
Bronze	Truong Bich Van	Athletics	Women's Shot Put F56/57	12 Oct
Bronze	Tran Thi Bich Thuy	Chess	Women's Individual Rapid P1	12 Oct
Bronze	Dao Thi Le Xuan	Chess	Women's Individual Rapid VI - B1	12 Oct
Bronze	Dao Thi Le Xuan; Pham Thi Huong	Chess	Women's Team Rapid VI - B1	12 Oct
Bronze	Do Thanh Hai	Swimming	Men's 200m Individual Medley SM6 (5-6)	12 Oct
Bronze	Trinh Ahn Tuan	Badminton	Men's Singles SL3	13 Oct
Bronze	Vo Quoc Hung; Pham Van Hoang	Table tennis	Men's Team- TT 8	13 Oct
Bronze	Viet Thi Kim Van; Nguyen Ti Hoa Phuong	Table tennis	Women's Team- TT 8-10	13 Oct

== Medals by sport ==
Medals by sport
Sport	1st place, gold medalist(s)	2nd place, silver medalist(s)	3rd place, bronze medalist(s)	Total
Athletics	0	1	7	8
Badminton	0	0	1	1
Chess	2	3	4	9
Powerlifting	2	1	1	4
Swimming	4	3	9	16
Table tennis	0	0	2	2
Total	8	8	24	40

== Medals by day ==
Medals by day
Day	Date	1st place, gold medalist(s)	2nd place, silver medalist(s)	3rd place, bronze medalist(s)	Total
1	October 7	1	0	1	2
2	October 8	3	1	5	9
3	October 9	1	1	3	5
4	October 10	1	2	4	7
5	October 11	0	2	2	4
6	October 12	2	2	6	10
7	October 13	0	0	3	3
Total		8	8	24	40

== See also ==
- Vietnam at the 2018 Asian Games
