= Chess at the 2018 Asian Para Games =

- Venue: Cempaka Putih Sport Hall
- Location: Jakarta, Indonesia
- Dates: 7–12 October
- Competitors: 86 in 24 events

Chess at the 2018 Asian Para Games was held at Cempaka Putih Sport Hall, Jakarta, Indonesia from 7 to 12 October. The chess programme in 2018 includes four individual and team events; men's and women's individual rapid, and men's and women's individual standard.

== Events ==
1. Women's Individual Standard VI – B1
2. Women's Individual Standard VI – B2/B3
3. Women's Individual Standard P1
4. Women's Team Standard VI – B1
5. Women's Team Standard VI – B2/B3
6. Women's Team Standard P1
7. Women's Individual Rapid VI – B1
8. Women's Individual Rapid VI – B2/B3
9. Women's Individual Rapid P1
10. Women's Team Rapid VI – B1
11. Women's Team Rapid VI – B2/B3
12. Women's Team Rapid P1
13. Men's Individual Standard VI – B1
14. Men's Individual Standard VI – B2/B3
15. Men's Individual Standard P1
16. Men's Team Standard VI – B1
17. Men's Team Standard VI – B2/B3
18. Men's Team Standard P1
19. Men's Individual Rapid VI – B1
20. Men's Individual Rapid VI – B2/B3
21. Men's Individual Rapid P1
22. Men's Team Rapid VI – B1
23. Men's Team Rapid VI – B2/B3
24. Men's Team Rapid P1

== Medal table ==
* Host nation (Indonesia)

Rank	NPC	Gold	Silver	Bronze	Total
1	Indonesia (INA)*	11	5	6	22
2	Philippines (PHI)	5	2	6	13
3	Iran (IRI)	4	6	4	14
4	India (IND)	2	5	2	9
5	Vietnam (VIE)	2	3	4	9
6	Myanmar (MYA)	0	2	0	2
7	Kazakhstan (KAZ)	0	1	0	1
Totals (7 entries)		24	24	22	70

== Medalists ==
=== Men ===
Event	Class	Gold	Silver	Bronze
Individual standard	P1	Sander Severino; Philippines	Maksum Firdaus; Indonesia	Jasper Rom; Philippines
Team standard	P1	Philippines; Sander Severino; Jasper Rom; Henry Roger Lopez	Indonesia; Maksum Firdaus; Suhardi Sinaga; Sutikno	not awarded
Individual rapid	P1	Sander Severino; Philippines	Henry Roger Lopez; Philippines	Jasper Rom; Philippines
Team rapid	P1	Philippines; Sander Severino; Jasper Rom; Henry Roger Lopez	Indonesia; Sutikno; Maksum Firdaus; Suhardi Sinaga	not awarded
Individual standard	B1	Hendi Wirawan; Indonesia	Kaung San; Myanmar	Edy Suryanto; Indonesia
Team standard	B1	Indonesia; Hendi Wirawan; Edy Suryanto; Carsidi	Myanmar; Kaung San; Myo San Aung; Than Htay	Iran; Erfan Mohammadalizadeh; Mehdi Roumifard; Hassanali Ghadiri
Individual rapid	B1	Edy Suryanto; Indonesia	Bolat Kabyzhanov; Kazakhstan	Carsidi; Indonesia
Team rapid	B1	Indonesia; Edy Suryanto; Carsidi; Hendi Wirawan	India; Prachurya Kumar Pradhan; Mohammed Salih Pay Kandiyil	Philippines; Francis Ching; Rodolfo Sarmiento; Cecilio Bilog
Individual standard	B2/3	Omid Karimi; Iran	Menandro Redor; Philippines	Arman Subaste; Philippines
Team standard	B2/3	Philippines; Menandro Redor; Arman Subaste; Israel Peligro	Iran; Omid Karimi; Majid Bagheri; Alireza Ghoorchibeygi	Indonesia; Gayuh Satrio; Adji Hartono; M. Haryanto
Individual rapid	B2/3	Kishan Gangolli; India	Gayuh Satrio; Indonesia	Arman Subaste; Philippines
Team rapid	B2/3	Indonesia; Gayuh Satrio; Adji Hartono; M. Haryanto	India; Kishan Gangolli; Ashvin Makwana; Soundarya Kumar Pradhan	Philippines; Arman Subaste; Menandro Redor; Israel Peligro

=== Women ===
Event	Class	Gold	Silver	Bronze
Individual standard	P1	Nasip Farta Simanja; Indonesia	K. Jennitha Anto; India	Roslinda Manurung; Indonesia
Team standard	P1	Indonesia; Nasip Farta Simanja; Roslinda Manurung; Yuni	Vietnam; Trần Thị Bích Thủy; Nguyễn Thị Kiều; Đoàn Thu Huyền	India; K. Jennitha Anto; Prema Kanishsri Raju
Individual rapid	P1	K. Jennitha Anto; India	Nguyễn Thị Kiều; Vietnam	Trần Thị Bích Thủy; Vietnam
Team rapid	P1	Vietnam; Đoàn Thu Huyền; Trần Thị Bích Thủy; Nguyễn Thị Kiều	India; K. Jennitha Anto; Prema Kanishsri Raju	Indonesia; Nasip Farta Simanja; Yuni; Roslinda Manurung
Individual standard	B1	Debi Ariesta; Indonesia	Tati Karhati; Indonesia	Leila Zarezadeh; Iran
Team standard	B1	Indonesia; Debi Ariesta; Tati Karhati; Wilma Margaretha Sinaga	Iran; Leila Zarezadeh; Maliheh Safaei; Zahra Mohammadi Rad	Vietnam; Phạm Thị Hương; Đào Thị Lê Xuân
Individual rapid	B1	Tati Karhati; Indonesia	Maliheh Safaei; Iran	Đào Thị Lê Xuân; Vietnam
Team rapid	B1	Indonesia; Tati Karhati; Debi Ariesta; Wilma Margaretha Sinaga	Iran; Maliheh Safaei; Leila Zarezadeh; Zahra Mohammadi Rad	Vietnam; Đào Thị Lê Xuân; Phạm Thị Hương
Individual standard	B2/3	Atefeh Naghavi; Iran	Fariba Zendehboudi; Iran	Fatemeh Barghoul; Iran
Team standard	B2/3	Iran; Atefeh Naghavi; Fariba Zendehboudi; Fatemeh Barghoul	Vietnam; Nguyễn Thị Minh Thư; Nguyễn Thị Mỹ Linh; Nguyễn Thị Hồng Châu	India; Mrunali Prakash Pande; Megha Chakraborty; Tijan Punaram Gawar
Individual rapid	B2/3	Nguyễn Thị Mỹ Linh; Vietnam	Fatemeh Barghoul; Iran	Fariba Zendehboudi; Iran
Team rapid	B2/3	Iran; Fatemeh Barghoul; Fariba Zendehboudi; Atefeh Naghavi	India; Megha Chakraborty; Mrunali Prakash Pande; Tijan Punaram Gawar	Indonesia; Aisah Wijayanti Brahmana; Khairunnisa; Tita Puspita

== See also ==
- Chess at the 2017 ASEAN Para Games
