= Lawn bowls at the 2018 Asian Para Games =

- Venue: Gelora Bung Karno Hockey Field
- Location: Jakarta, Indonesia
- Dates: 7–12 October

Lawn bowls at the 2018 Asian Para Games was held in Jakarta between 7 and 12 October 2018.

== Medal table ==
* Host nation (Indonesia)

Rank	NPC	Gold	Silver	Bronze	Total
1	South Korea (KOR)	7	1	1	9
2	Indonesia (INA)*	5	4	6	15
3	Hong Kong (HKG)	3	4	2	9
4	Malaysia (MAS)	0	6	2	8
Totals (4 entries)		15	15	11	41

== Medals (2014-2018) ==
Source (NPC Profile):

Rank	Nation	Gold	Silver	Bronze	Total
1	South Korea (KOR)	14	8	4	26
2	Indonesia (INA)	5	4	6	15
3	Hong Kong (HKG)	4	6	4	14
4	Malaysia (MAS)	2	7	6	15
5	Japan (JPN)	0	0	1	1
Totals (5 entries)		25	25	21	71

== Medalists ==
=== Men ===
Event	Class	Gold	Silver	Bronze
Singles	B6	Im Chun-kyu; South Korea	Norfirzan Mahmud; Malaysia	I Wayan Damai; Indonesia
Singles	B7	Kim Sang-sun; South Korea	Haszely Elias; Malaysia	Asep Darmawan; Indonesia
Singles	B8	So Wan-gi; South Korea	Abdul Rais Mokhtar; Malaysia	Sudarno; Indonesia

=== Women ===
Event	Class	Gold	Silver	Bronze
Singles	B6	Mella Windasari; Indonesia	Retnowati Yugia Sibarani; Indonesia	Jang Sun-bun; South Korea
Singles	B7	Yoon Bok-ja; South Korea	Wu Man Ying; Hong Kong	Sriyanti; Indonesia
Singles	B8	Lee Gyeong-suk; South Korea	Salmiah Zakaria; Malaysia	Tang Mei Yi; Hong Kong

=== Mixed ===
Event	Class	Gold	Silver	Bronze
Singles	B1	Dwi Widiantoro; Indonesia	Ni'matul Fauziah; Indonesia	none awarded
Singles	B2	Julia Verawati; Indonesia	Rockey Li Chi Ming; Hong Kong	Yim Man Ching; Hong Kong
Singles	B3	Tang Shun Yee; Hong Kong	Dian Kristiyaningsih; Indonesia	none awarded
Singles	B4	Suwondo; Indonesia	Kwok Wing; Hong Kong	none awarded
Pairs	B2	Indonesia; Julia Verawati; Kacung	Hong Kong; Yim Man Ching; Rockey Li Chi Ming	Malaysia; Masnah Arbik; Abdillah Rashid
Pairs	B4	Hong Kong; Tang Shun Yee; Kwok Wing	Indonesia; Euis Rahayu Efendi; Suwondo	not awarded
Pairs	B6	South Korea; Kang Jae-bun; Lee Jeong-kwan	Malaysia; Rattna'aizah Idris; Norfirzan Mahmud	Indonesia; Mella Windasari; I Wayan Damai
Pairs	B7	South Korea; Kim Jae-hong; Kim Young-dan	Malaysia; Haszely Elias; Jariah Zakaria	Indonesia; Sriyanti; Sukirman
Pairs	B8	Hong Kong; Tang Mei Yi; Li Ying Wing	South Korea; Jeong Sang-cheol; Kim Seung-hui	Malaysia; Abdul Rais Mokhtar; Salmiah Zakaria
