= Malaysia at the 2018 Asian Para Games =

- IPC code: MAS
- NPC: Malaysian Paralympic Council

in Jakarta 6–13 October 2018
- Competitors: 126 in 15 sports
- Flag bearer: Abu Bakar Nyat
- Medals Ranked 8th: Gold 17 Silver 26 Bronze 25 Total 68

Asian Para Games appearances (overview)
- 2010; 2014; 2018; 2022

Malaysia participated at the 2018 Asian Para Games which was held in Jakarta, Indonesia from 6 to 13 October 2018.

The Malaysian delegation is composed of 221 people, 126 of them are athletes which participated in 15 out of 18 events in the games (all except Goalball, Judo and Sitting Volleyball), while the rest are coaches. Lee Seng Chow serves as the head of the delegation.

== Medalists ==
The following Malaysian competitors won medals at the Games.

Medal	Name	Sport	Event	Date
Gold	Mohamad Ridzuan	Athletics	Men's 100M T36	9 Oct
Gold	Abdul Latif	Athletics	Men's Long Jump T20	9 Oct
Gold	Siti Noor Iasah Mohamad Ariffin	Athletics	Women's 400M T20	9 Oct
Gold	Nasharuddin	Athletics	Men's 400M T20	9 Oct
Gold	Zuhairie	Cycling	Men's Road Race (C5)	9 Oct
Gold	Nur Azlia Syafinaz	Cycling	Women's Road Race (B)	9 Oct
Gold	Abu Bakar Nyat	Bowling	Mixed Singles TPB9	9 Oct
Gold	Chee Chaoming; Ting Ing Hock	Table tennis	Men's Double- TT 8-9	10 Oct
Gold	Mohamad Ridzuan	Athletics	Men's 400M T36	10 Oct
Gold	Nur Azlia Syafinaz	Cycling	Women's B Individual Pursuit 3000M	11 Oct
Gold	Mohamad Ridzuan	Athletics	Men's Long Jump T36	11 Oct
Gold	Muhammad Nur Syaiful	Swimming	Men's 50M Freestyle S5	11 Oct
Gold	Abu Bakar Nyat; Mohd Azrin Rahim; Zahidi	Bowling	Mixed Trios Team TPB8+TPB8/9+TPB9/10	11 Oct
Gold	Muhammad Ziyad Zolkefli	Athletics	Men's Shot Put F20	12 Oct
Gold	Eddy Bernard	Athletics	Men's Long Jump T44, T62/64	12 Oct
Gold	Nur Azlia Syafinaz	Cycling	Women's B Kilo	13 Oct
Gold	Muhammad Afiq Afify	Cycling	Men's B Kilo	13 Oct
Silver	Norhilme Zainudin; Faris Ahmad Azri; Cheah Liek Hou; Hairul Fozi Saaba; Omar Bakri; Amyrul Yazid Ahmad Sibi	Badminton	Men's Team Standing (SL3-SU5)	7 Oct
Silver	Fraidden Dawan	Swimming	Men's 100M Butterfly S10	7 Oct
Silver	Zakaria Salmiah	Lawn bowls	Women's Singles B8	7 Oct
Silver	Mohd Khairul Hazwan	Cycling	Men's Time Trial (B)	8 Oct
Silver	Nur Azlia Syafinaz	Cycling	Women's Time Trial (B)	8 Oct
Silver	Mohd Najib	Cycling	Men's Road Race (C4)	8 Oct
Silver	Siti Noor Radiah Ismail	Athletics	Women's Long Jump T20	8 Oct
Silver	Bonnie Bunyau	Powerlifting	Men's 65kg	9 Oct
Silver	Muhammad Nur Syaiful	Swimming	Men's 100M Freestyle S5	9 Oct
Silver	Muhammad Nur Syaiful	Swimming	Men's 200M Freestyle S5	10 Oct
Silver	Mohamad Mokhtar Abdul Rais	Lawn bowls	Men's Singles B8	10 Oct
Silver	Norfirzan	Lawn bowls	Men's Singles B6	10 Oct
Silver	Haszely	Lawn bowls	Men's Singles B7	10 Oct
Silver	Mohd Khairul Ishak; Zahidi	Bowling	Mixed Doubles TPB8+TPB8	10 Oct
Silver	Abu Bakar Nyat; Mohd Azrin Rahim	Bowling	Mixed Doubles TPB9+TPB9	10 Oct
Silver	Wong Kar Gee	Athletics	Men's Long Jump T12	11 Oct
Silver	Mohamad Yusof Hafizi; Mohd Najib; Zuhairie	Cycling	Men's C 1-5 Team Sprint	11 Oct
Silver	Mohd Khairul Hazwan	Cycling	Men's B Individual Pursuit 4000M	11 Oct
Silver	Mohamad Aliff	Athletics	Men's Shot Put F20	12 Oct
Silver	Mohamad Ashraf	Athletics	Men's 1500M T45/46	12 Oct
Silver	Rattna'aizah; Norfirzan	Lawn bowls	Mixed Pairs B6	12 Oct
Silver	Haszely; Jariah	Lawn bowls	Mixed Pairs B7	12 Oct
Silver	Didin Taresoh	Badminton	Men's Singles SS6	12 Oct
Silver	Mohd Najib	Cycling	Men's C4 Individual Pursuit 4000M	12 Oct
Silver	Mohamad Yusof Hafizi	Cycling	Men's C1-2-3 Kilo	13 Oct
Silver	Aiman Asyraff	Cycling	Men's B Kilo	13 Oct
Bronze	James Wong Tien Yu	Swimming	Men's 200M Individual Medley SM8	7 Oct
Bronze	Anderson Jamba	Swimming	Men's 100M Breaststroke	7 Oct
Bronze	Mohd Najib	Cycling	Men's Time Trial (C4)	8 Oct
Bronze	Mohd Rizal	Bowling	Men's Singles TPB3	8 Oct
Bronze	Abg Yahya Abg Azhar	Bowling	Men's Singles TPB4	9 Oct
Bronze	Ruzila	Bowling	Women's Singles TPB8	9 Oct
Bronze	Wong Kee Soon	Bowling	Mixed Singles TPB9	9 Oct
Bronze	Jamery Siga	Swimming	Men's 50M Butterfly S5 (2-5)	9 Oct
Bronze	Azwan Bakar	Table tennis	Men's Singles- TT 10	9 Oct
Bronze	Chee Chaoming	Table tennis	Men's Singles- TT 9	9 Oct
Bronze	Fraidden Dawan	Swimming	Men's 200M Individual Medley SM10	9 Oct
Bronze	Muhammad Adam	Wheelchair fencing	Men Sabre - Category B	9 Oct
Bronze	Abg Yahya Abg Azhar; Nur Syazwani	Bowling	Mixed Doubles TPB4+TPB4	10 Oct
Bronze	Mohd Rizal; Muhamad Hairul Miran	Bowling	Mixed Doubles TPB1+TPB3	10 Oct
Bronze	Jamery Siga	Swimming	Men's 200M Freestyle S5	10 Oct
Bronze	Mohamad Faizal Aideal	Athletics	Men's 100M T12	10 Oct
Bronze	Nur Syahida	Cycling	Women's B Individual Pursuit 3000M	11 Oct
Bronze	Doriah Poulus	Athletics	Women's Shot Put F43/44, F62/64	11 Oct
Bronze	Arbik Masnah; Mohd Abdillah	Lawn bowls	Mixed Pairs B2	12 Oct
Bronze	Mohamad Mokhtar Abdul Rais; Zakaria Salmiah	Lawn bowls	Mixed Pairs B8	12 Oct
Bronze	Zuhairie	Cycling	Men's C4-5 Kilo	13 Oct
Bronze	Nur Syahida	Cycling	Women's B Kilo	13 Oct
Bronze	Cheah Liek Hou	Badminton	Men's Singles SU5	13 Oct
Bronze	Cheah Liek Hou; Hairul Fozi Saaba	Badminton	Men's Doubles SU5	13 Oct
Bronze	Mohammad Faris Ahmad Azri; Amyrul Yazid Ahmad Sibi	Badminton	Men's Doubles SU5	13 Oct

Medals by sport
Sport	1st place, gold medalist(s)	2nd place, silver medalist(s)	3rd place, bronze medalist(s)	Total
Athletics	8	4	2	14
Badminton	0	2	3	5
Bowling	2	2	6	10
Cycling	5	8	4	17
Lawn Bowls	0	6	2	8
Powerlifting	0	1	0	1
Swimming	1	3	5	9
Table tennis	1	0	2	3
Wheelchair fencing	0	0	1	1
Total	17	26	25	68

Medals by day
Day	Date	1st place, gold medalist(s)	2nd place, silver medalist(s)	3rd place, bronze medalist(s)	Total
1	6 October	0	0	0	0
2	7 October	0	3	2	5
3	8 October	0	3	2	5
4	9 October	7	3	8	18
5	10 October	2	6	4	11
6	11 October	4	3	2	9
7	12 October	2	6	2	10
8	13 October	2	2	5	9
Total		17	26	25	68

== Multiple medallists ==
The following Malaysia competitors won several medals at the 2018 Asian Para Games.

Name	Medal	Sport	Event
Nur Azlia Syafinaz	Gold; Gold; Gold; Silver	Cycling	Women's Road Race (B); Women's B Individual Pursuit 3000M; Women's B Kilo; Women's Time Trial (B)
Mohamad Ridzuan	Gold; Gold; Gold	Athletics	Men's 100M T36; Men's 400M T36; Men's Long Jump T36
Abu Bakar Nyat	Gold; Gold; Silver	Bowling	Mixed Singles TPB9; Mixed Trios Team TPB8+TPB8/9+TPB9/10; Mixed Doubles TPB9+TPB9
Muhammad Nur Syaiful	Gold; Silver; Silver	Swimming	Men's 50M Freestyle S5; Men's 100M Freestyle S5; Men's 200M Freestyle S5
Zuhairie	Gold; Silver; Bronze	Cycling	Men's Road Race (C5); Men's C 1-5 Team Sprint; Men's C4-5 Kilo
Mohd Azrin Rahim	Gold; Silver; Bronze	Bowling	Mixed Trios Team TPB8+TPB8/9+TPB9/10; Mixed Doubles TPB9+TPB9
Zahidi	Gold; Silver; Bronze	Bowling	Mixed Trios Team TPB8+TPB8/9+TPB9/10; Mixed Doubles TPB8+TPB8
Chee Chaoming	Gold; Bronze	Table tennis	Men's Double- TT 8-9; Men's Singles- TT 9
Mohd Najib	Silver; Silver; Bronze	Cycling	Men's Road Race (C4); Men's C4 Individual Pursuit 4000M; Men's Time Trial (C4)
Mohd Khairul Hazwan	Silver; Silver	Cycling	Men's Time Trial (B); Men's B Individual Pursuit 4000M
Norfirzan	Silver; Silver	Lawn bowls	Men's Singles B6; Mixed Pairs B6
Haszely	Silver; Silver	Lawn bowls	Men's Singles B7; Mixed Pairs B7
Mohamad Yusof Hafizi	Silver; Silver	Cycling	Men's C 1-5 Team Sprint; Men's C1-2-3 Kilo
Cheah Liek Hou	Silver; Bronze; Bronze	Badminton	Men's Team Standing (SL3-SU5); Men's Singles SU5; Men's Doubles SU5
Fraidden Dawan	Silver; Bronze	Swimming	Men's 100M Butterfly S10; Men's 200M Individual Medley SM10
Mohamad Mokhtar Abdul Rais	Silver; Bronze	Lawn bowls	Men's Singles B8; Mixed Pairs B8
Zakaria Salmiah	Silver; Bronze	Lawn bowls	Women's Singles B8; Mixed Pairs B8
Hairul Fozi Saaba	Silver; Bronze	Badminton	Men's Team Standing (SL3-SU5); Men's Doubles SU5
Mohammad Faris Ahmad Azri	Silver; Bronze	Badminton	Men's Team Standing (SL3-SU5); Men's Doubles SU5
Mohd Rizal	Bronze; Bronze	Bowling	Men's Singles TPB3; Mixed Doubles TPB1+TPB3
Abg Yahya Abg Azhar	Bronze; Bronze	Bowling	Men's Singles TPB4; Mixed Doubles TPB4+TPB4
Jamery Siga	Bronze; Bronze	Swimming	Men's 50M Butterfly S5 (2-5); Men's 200M Freestyle S5
Nur Syahida	Bronze; Bronze	Cycling	Women's B Individual Pursuit 3000M; Women's B Kilo

== See also ==
- Malaysia at the 2018 Asian Games
