= Fotimakhon Amilova =

Uzbekistani Paralympic swimmer (born 1999)

Medal record

Paralympic swimming

Representing Uzbekistan

Paralympic Games
Gold medal – first place	2016 Rio de Janeiro	100 metre breaststroke SB13
Silver medal – second place	2016 Rio de Janeiro	200 m individual medley SM13
Bronze medal – third place	2016 Rio de Janeiro	100 m butterfly S13

Asian Para Games
Gold medal – first place	2018 Jakarta	50 m freestyle - S13
Gold medal – first place	2018 Jakarta	100 m freestyle - S13
Gold medal – first place	2018 Jakarta	100 m breaststroke - SB13
Gold medal – first place	2018 Jakarta	200 m medley - SM13
Silver medal – second place	2018 Jakarta	100 m butterfly - S13
Silver medal – second place	2018 Jakarta	400m freestyle - S13
Bronze medal – third place	2018 Jakarta	100 m backstroke - S13

Fotimakhon Amilova (born 11 February 1999) is an Uzbeki Paralympic swimmer who represented Uzbekistan at the 2016 Summer Paralympics. She set a world record at the female SB13 100 m breaststroke. She had won gold, silver and bronze medals at Rio 2016 Paralympics.
