= Korea at the 2018 Asian Para Games =

- Korean Unification Flag
- IPC code: COR

in Jakarta, Indonesia 6–13 October 2018
- Competitors: 12 in 2 sports
- Flag bearers: Kim Sun-mi (South Korea); Sim Sung-hyok (North Korea)
- Medals Ranked 31st: Gold 0 Silver 1 Bronze 1 Total 2

Asian Para Games appearances (overview)
- 2010; 2014; 2018; 2022

Other related appearances
- North Korea; South Korea

South Korea and North Korea competed in some events at the 2018 Asian Para Games as a unified team, under the title "Korea" (COR). The two Koreas competed under one team in three events; one in swimming and two in table tennis. This marked the first time the two countries compete in para-sport event.

The delegation of the two Koreas marched together in the opening ceremony. South Korean wheelchair fencer Kim Sun-mi and North Korean swimmer Sim Sung-hyok were the joint flag-bearers during the ceremony.

== Competitors ==
The following is a list of the number of competitors representing the unified Korea that participated at the Games:

Sport	(North Korea)	(South Korea)	Total
Swimming	2	6	8
Table tennis	2	2	4
Total	4	8	12

Unlike Asian Games, athletes also competed under their respective national team in individual events.

== Medalists ==
Medal	Name	Sport	Event	Date
Silver	Kim Yong-rok; Park Hong-kyu	Table tennis	Men's Team TT 6–7	13 October
Bronze	Kim Sae-hun; Kwon Hyun; Kwon Yong-hwa; Lee Dong-gu	Swimming	Men's 4 × 100 m freestyle relay - 34 points	8 October

== Swimming ==
A unified Korean swimming team participated in the men's freestyle relay and mixed relay with South Korean coach Sun Chang-yong mentoring the team.

Men's freestyle relay

- (South Korea) Kwon Yong-hwa (S7 category)
- (South Korea) Lim Woo-geun (SB5)
- (South Korea) Kwon Hyun (S9)
- (North Korea) Jong Guk-song (S9)

Mixed relay

- (South Korea) Kwon Hyun
- (South Korea) Kwon Yong-hwa
- (South Korea) Lee Dong-gu (S7)
- (South Korea) Kim Sae-hun (S9)
- (South Korea) Jeon Hyung-woo (S9)
- (North Korea) Jong Guk-song
- (North Korea) Sim Song-hyok

== Table tennis ==
Two players each from South and North Korea played for the unified Korea team at the Para Asian Games. Ri Chol-ung of North Korea served as their head coach.

- (South Korea) Park Hong-kyu
- (South Korea) Lee Se-ho
- (North Korea) Pak Kum-jin
- (North Korea) Kim Yong-rok

== See also ==
- Korea at the 2018 Asian Games
