= Singapore at the 2018 Asian Para Games =

- IPC code: SGP
- NPC: Singapore National Paralympic Council

in Jakarta 6–13 October 2018
- Competitors: 44 in 10 sports
- Flag bearer: Nur Syahidah Alim
- Medals Ranked 16th: Gold 3 Silver 2 Bronze 5 Total 10

Asian Para Games appearances (overview)
- 2010; 2014; 2018; 2022

Singapore participated at the 2018 Asian Para Games which was held in Jakarta, Indonesia from 6 to 13 October 2018.

The Singaporean delegation is composed of 44 athletes which participated in 10 out of 18 events in the games namely: Archery, Athletics, Badminton, Boccia, Bowling, cycling, Lawn bowls, Powerlifting, Shooting and swimming. Ali Daud serves as the head of the delegation

== Medalists ==
The following Singaporean competitors won medals at the Games.

Medal	Name	Sport	Event	Date
Gold	Toh Wei Soong	Swimming	Men's 50m Freestyle S7	07 Oct
Gold	Yip Pin Xiu	Swimming	Women's 50m Backstroke S4 (1-4)	08 Oct
Gold	Toh Wei Soong	Swimming	Men's 100m Freestyle S7	09 Oct
Silver	Diane Neo Pei Lin	Bowling	Women's Singles TPB4	09 Oct
Silver	Nurulasyiqah Taha; Toh Sze Ning; Faye Lim Yu Fei	Boccia	Mixed Pairs-BC3	12 Oct
Bronze	Tan Swang Hee	Bowling	Mixed Singles TPB10	08 Oct
Bronze	Emily Lee Seok Bee (Pilot:Sarah Tan)	Cycling	Women's Road Race (B)	09 Oct
Bronze	Yip Pin Xiu	Swimming	Women's 100m Freestyle S4 (1-4)	09 Oct
Bronze	Toh Wei Soong	Swimming	Men's 100m Backstroke S7	10 Oct
Bronze	Yip Pin Xiu	Swimming	Women's 50m Freestyle S4 (1-4)	11 Oct

== Medals by sport ==
Medals by sport
Sport	1st place, gold medalist(s)	2nd place, silver medalist(s)	3rd place, bronze medalist(s)	Total
Boccia	0	1	0	1
Bowling	0	1	1	2
Cycling	0	0	1	1
Swimming	3	0	3	6
Total	3	2	5	10

== Medals by day ==
Medals by day
Day	Date	1st place, gold medalist(s)	2nd place, silver medalist(s)	3rd place, bronze medalist(s)	Total
1	October 7	1	0	0	1
2	October 8	1	0	1	2
3	October 9	1	1	2	4
4	October 10	0	0	1	1
5	October 11	0	0	1	1
6	October 12	0	1	0	1
7	October 13	0	0	0	0
Total		3	2	5	10

== See also ==
- Singapore at the 2018 Asian Games
