= Badminton at the 2018 Asian Para Games =

- Venue: Istora Gelora Bung Karno
- Location: Jakarta, Indonesia
- Dates: 6–13 October

Badminton tournament at the 2018 Asian Para Games was held at Istora Gelora Bung Karno, Jakarta, Indonesia from 6 to 13 October. The badminton programme in 2018 included men's and women's singles competitions; men's, women's and mixed doubles competitions alongside men's team events.

== Classification ==
The players were classified to six different classes as per determined by Badminton World Federation.

== Medal table ==
* Host nation (Indonesia)

Rank	NPC	Gold	Silver	Bronze	Total
1	China (CHN)	7	4	5	16
2	Indonesia (INA)*	6	5	4	15
3	India (IND)	3	0	6	9
4	South Korea (KOR)	2	2	5	9
5	Hong Kong (HKG)	1	1	2	4
6	Thailand (THA)	0	4	5	9
7	Malaysia (MAS)	0	2	3	5
8	Japan (JPN)	0	1	6	7
9	Vietnam (VIE)	0	0	1	1
Totals (9 entries)		19	19	37	75

== Medalists ==
Below are the medalists:

=== Men ===
Event	Class	Gold	Silver	Bronze
Singles	SL3	Pramod Bhagat; India	Ukun Rukaendi; Indonesia	Manoj Sarkar; India
Singles	SL3	Pramod Bhagat; India	Ukun Rukaendi; Indonesia	Trịnh Anh Tuấn; Vietnam
Singles	SL4	Tarun Dhillon; India	Fredy Setiawan; Indonesia	Gao Yuyang; China
Singles	SL4	Tarun Dhillon; India	Fredy Setiawan; Indonesia	Hikmat Ramdani; Indonesia
Singles	SS6	Chu Man Kai; Hong Kong	Didin Taresoh; Malaysia	Wong Chun Yim; Hong Kong
Singles	SS6	Chu Man Kai; Hong Kong	Didin Taresoh; Malaysia	Krishna Nagar; India
Singles	SU5	Dheva Anrimusthi; Indonesia	Suryo Nugroho; Indonesia	Oddie Kurnia Dwi; Indonesia
Singles	SU5	Dheva Anrimusthi; Indonesia	Suryo Nugroho; Indonesia	Cheah Liek Hou; Malaysia
Singles	WH1	Choi Jung-man; South Korea	Qu Zimo; China	Lee Dong-seop; South Korea
Singles	WH1	Choi Jung-man; South Korea	Qu Zimo; China	Osamu Nagashima; Japan
Singles	WH2	Kim Jung-jun; South Korea	Chan Ho Yuen; Hong Kong	Mai Jianpeng; China
Singles	WH2	Kim Jung-jun; South Korea	Chan Ho Yuen; Hong Kong	Kim Kyung-hoon; South Korea
Doubles	SL3–SL4	Indonesia; Dwiyoko; Fredy Setiawan	South Korea; Jeon Sun-woo; Joo Dong-jae	India; Pramod Bhagat; Manoj Sarkar
Doubles	SL3–SL4	Indonesia; Dwiyoko; Fredy Setiawan	South Korea; Jeon Sun-woo; Joo Dong-jae	India; Ananda Kumar; Nitesh Kumar
Doubles	SU5	Indonesia; Dheva Anrimusthi; Hafizh Briliansyah Prawiranegara	Indonesia; Suryo Nugroho; Oddie Kurnia Dwi	Malaysia; Cheah Liek Hou; Hairul Fozi Saaba
Doubles	SU5	Indonesia; Dheva Anrimusthi; Hafizh Briliansyah Prawiranegara	Indonesia; Suryo Nugroho; Oddie Kurnia Dwi	Malaysia; Mohammad Faris Ahmad Azri; Amyrul Yazid Ahmad Sibi
Doubles	WH1–WH2	China; Mai Jianpeng; Qu Zimo	South Korea; Kim Jung-jun; Lee Dong-seop	South Korea; Choi Jung-man; Kim Kyung-hoon
Doubles	WH1–WH2	China; Mai Jianpeng; Qu Zimo	South Korea; Kim Jung-jun; Lee Dong-seop	Thailand; Junthong Dumnern; Jakarin Homhual
Team standing	SL3–SU5	Indonesia; Fredy Setiawan; Dheva Anrimusthi; Hafizh Briliansyah Prawiranegara; Hary Susanto; Suryo Nugroho; Ukun Rukaendi	Malaysia; Norhilmie Zainudin; Mohammad Faris Ahmad Azri; Cheah Liek Hou; Hairul Fozi Saaba; Omar Bakri; Amyrul Yazid Ahmad Sibi	India; Suhas Lalinakere Yathiraj; Chirag Baretha; Raj Kumar; Tarun Dhillon; Sukant Kadam; Rakesh Pandey
Team standing	SL3–SU5	Indonesia; Fredy Setiawan; Dheva Anrimusthi; Hafizh Briliansyah Prawiranegara; Hary Susanto; Suryo Nugroho; Ukun Rukaendi	Malaysia; Norhilmie Zainudin; Mohammad Faris Ahmad Azri; Cheah Liek Hou; Hairul Fozi Saaba; Omar Bakri; Amyrul Yazid Ahmad Sibi	Thailand; Chawarat Kittichokwattana; Pricha Somsiri; Watcharaphon Chok-uthaikul; Siripong Teamarrom

=== Women ===
Event	Class	Gold	Silver	Bronze
Singles	SL3	Parul Parmar; India	Wandee Kamtam; Thailand	Manasi Girishchandra Joshi; India
Singles	SL3	Parul Parmar; India	Wandee Kamtam; Thailand	Darunee Henpraiwan; Thailand
Singles	SL4	Cheng Hefang; China	Leani Ratri Oktila; Indonesia	Ma Huihui; China
Singles	SL4	Cheng Hefang; China	Leani Ratri Oktila; Indonesia	Khalimatus Sadiyah; Indonesia
Singles	SU5	Yang Qiuxia; China	Ayako Suzuki; Japan	Lam Tsz Huen; Hong Kong
Singles	WH1	Li Hongyan; China	Sujirat Pookkham; Thailand	Sarina Satomi; Japan
Singles	WH1	Li Hongyan; China	Sujirat Pookkham; Thailand	Kim Seung-suk; South Korea
Singles	WH2	Liu Yutong; China	Xu Tingting; China	Yuma Yamazaki; Japan
Singles	WH2	Liu Yutong; China	Xu Tingting; China	Amnouy Wetwithan; Thailand
Doubles	SL3–SU5	Indonesia; Leani Ratri Oktila; Khalimatus Sadiyah	China; Cheng Hefang; Ma Huihui	China; Xiao Zuxian; Yang Qiuxia
Doubles	SL3–SU5	Indonesia; Leani Ratri Oktila; Khalimatus Sadiyah	China; Cheng Hefang; Ma Huihui	Thailand; Nipada Saensupa; Chanida Srinavakul
Doubles	WH1–WH2	China; Li Hongyan; Xu Tingting	Thailand; Sujirat Pookkham; Amnouy Wetwithan	China; Liu Yutong; Zhang Jing
Doubles	WH1–WH2	China; Li Hongyan; Xu Tingting	Thailand; Sujirat Pookkham; Amnouy Wetwithan	Japan; Ikumi Fuke; Rie Ogura

=== Mixed ===
Event	Class	Gold	Silver	Bronze
Doubles	SL3–SU5	Indonesia; Hary Susanto; Leani Ratri Oktila	Thailand; Siripong Teamarrom; Nipada Saensupa	Indonesia; Hikmat Ramdani; Khalimatus Sadiyah
Doubles	SL3–SU5	Indonesia; Hary Susanto; Leani Ratri Oktila	Thailand; Siripong Teamarrom; Nipada Saensupa	Japan; Toshiaki Suenaga; Akiko Sugino
Doubles	WH1–WH2	China; Qu Zimo; Liu Yutong	China; Mai Jianpeng; Li Hongyan	Japan; Osamu Nagashima; Yuma Yamazaki
Doubles	WH1–WH2	China; Qu Zimo; Liu Yutong	China; Mai Jianpeng; Li Hongyan	South Korea; Lee Dong-seop; Lee Sun-ae

== Men's team standing (SL3-SU5) results ==
Round of 16
India	2
Chinese Taipei	0

Quarterfinals
Indonesia	2
Hong Kong	0
Thailand	2
South Korea	1
Malaysia	2
Vietnam	0
India	2
Japan	0

Semifinals
Indonesia	2
Thailand	0
Malaysia	2
India	1

Gold medal match
Indonesia	2
Malaysia	1

== See also ==
- Badminton at the 2018 Asian Games
