= Boccia at the 2018 Asian Para Games =

- Venue: Tanjung Priok Sports Hall
- Location: Jakarta, Indonesia
- Dates: 10–12 October

Boccia at the 2018 Asian Para Games in Jakarta was held between 10 and 12 October 2018.

== Medal table ==
* Host nation (Indonesia)

| Rank | NPC | Gold | Silver | Bronze | Total |
|---|---|---|---|---|---|
| 1 | Thailand (THA) | 3 | 2 | 1 | 6 |
| 2 | China (CHN) | 2 | 0 | 0 | 2 |
| 3 | South Korea (KOR) | 1 | 3 | 3 | 7 |
| 4 | Hong Kong (HKG) | 1 | 1 | 2 | 4 |
| 5 | Singapore (SGP) | 0 | 1 | 0 | 1 |
| 6 | Japan (JPN) | 0 | 0 | 1 | 1 |
| Totals (6 entries) | | 7 | 7 | 7 | 21 |

== Medalists ==
| Event | Class | Gold | Silver | Bronze |
|---|---|---|---|---|
| Mixed individual | BC1 | Witsanu Huadpradit; Thailand | Jung Sung-joon; South Korea | Kim Do-hyun; South Korea |
| Mixed individual | BC2 | Worawut Saengampa; Thailand | Watcharaphon Vongsa; Thailand | Yeung Hiu Lam; Hong Kong |
| Mixed individual | BC3 | Jeong Ho-won; South Korea | Kim Jun-yup; South Korea | Ho Yuen Kei; Hong Kong |
| Mixed individual | BC4 | Lin Ximei; China | Ritthikrai Somsanuk; Thailand | Won Seok-beop; South Korea |
| Mixed pairs | BC3 | Hong Kong; Tsang Ling Yan; Tse Tak Wah; Ho Yuen Kei | Singapore; Nurulasyiqah Taha; Toh Sze Ning; Faye Lim Yu Fei | South Korea; Kim Han-soo; Jeong Ho-won; Kim Jun-yup |
| Mixed pairs | BC4 | China; Lin Ximei; Zheng Yuansen; Guang Yuexiang | South Korea; Seo Hyeon-seok; Jang Seong-yuk; Won Seok-beop | Thailand; Nuanchan Phonsila; Pornchok Larpyen; Ritthikrai Somsanuk |
| Mixed team | BC1/BC2 | Thailand; Boontep Pachdee; Supin Tipmanee; Watcharaphon Vongsa; Witsanu Huadpradit; Worawut Saengampa | Hong Kong; Yeung Hiu Lam; Karen Kwok Hoi Ying; John Loung; Chan Kam Chau; Leung Mei Yee | Japan; Hidetaka Sugimura; Takayuki Hirose; Takumi Nakamura; Yuriko Fujii |
