= Chalermpong Punpoo =

Thai table tennis player

Personal information
- Nationality: Thai
- Born: 25 March 1981 (age 45)

Sport
- Country: Thailand
- Sport: Para table tennis
- Disability class: C7
Medal record
Para table tennis
Representing Thailand
Paralympic Games
| Bronze medal – third place | 2024 Paris | Singles C7 |
Asian Para Games
| Gold medal – first place | 2018 Jakarta | Doubles C6–7 |
| Silver medal – second place | 2018 Jakarta | Single C7 |
| Bronze medal – third place | 2014 Incheon | Teams C6–7 |
| Bronze medal – third place | 2022 Hangzhou | Singles C6 |

Chalermpong Punpoo (born 25 March 1981) is a Thai Para table tennis player. He represented Thailand at the 2020 and 2024 Summer Paralympics.

== Career ==
Punpoo represented Thailand at the 2024 Summer Paralympics and won a bronze medal in the singles C7 event.
