= Sander Severino =

Filipino chess player (1985–2026)

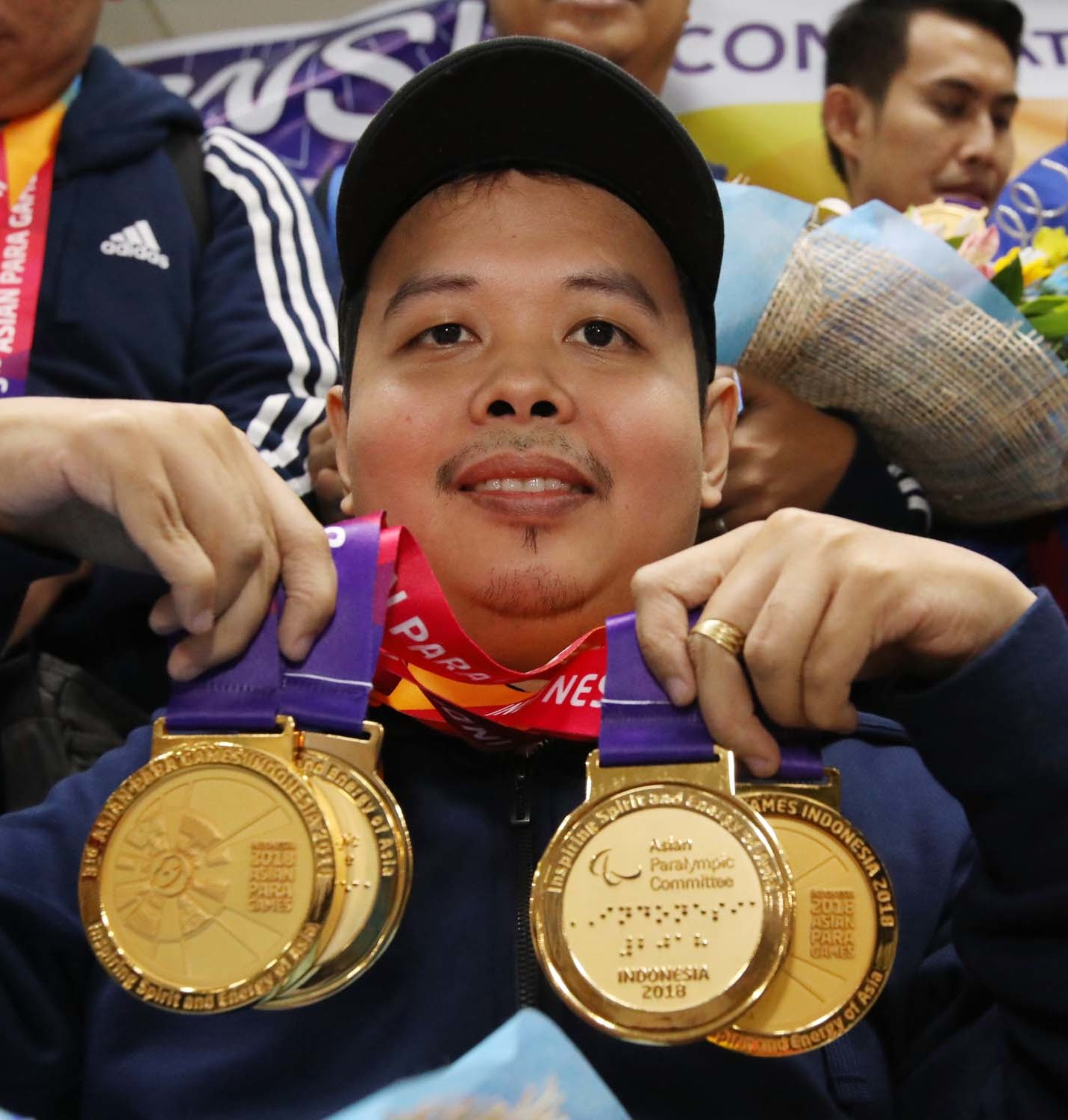
- Severino in 2018

Personal information
- Full name: Sander De Erit Severino
- Born: June 30, 1985
- Died: February 7, 2026 (aged 40) Silay, Negros Occidental, Philippines

Chess career
- Country: Philippines
- Title: FIDE Master (2015)
- Peak rating: 2405 (January 2007)
Medal record
Representing the Philippines
Event	1st	2nd	3rd
Asian Para Games	5	1	1
ASEAN Para Games	14	2	2
Total	19	3	3
Asian Para Games
Gold medal – first place	2018 Jakarta	Individual Standard P1
Gold medal – first place	2018 Jakarta	Individual Rapid P1
Gold medal – first place	2018 Jakarta	Team Standard P1
Gold medal – first place	2018 Jakarta	Team Rapid P1
Gold medal – first place	2022 Hangzhou	Individual standard PI
Silver medal – second place	2022 Hangzhou	Team standard PI
Bronze medal – third place	2022 Hangzhou	Team standard PI
ASEAN Para Games
Gold medal – first place	2025 Thailand	Men’s Individual Standard PI
Gold medal – first place	2025 Thailand	Men's Team Standard PI
Gold medal – first place	2025 Thailand	Men's Individual Blitz PI
Gold medal – first place	2025 Thailand	Men's Individual Rapid PI
Gold medal – first place	2025 Thailand	Men's Tean Blitz PI
Gold medal – first place	2022 Surakarta	Individual Standard PI
Gold medal – first place	2022 Surakarta	Team Standard PI
Gold medal – first place	2022 Surakarta	Individual Rapid PI
Gold medal – first place	2022 Surakarta	Team Rapid PI
Gold medal – first place	2017 Kuala Lumpur	Individual Standard PI
Gold medal – first place	2017 Kuala Lumpur	Team Standard PI
Gold medal – first place	2017 Kuala Lumpur	Team Rapid PI
Gold medal – first place	2015 Singapore	Individual Rapid PI
Gold medal – first place	2015 Singapore	Team Rapid PI
Silver medal – second place	2025 Thailand	Men’s Team Rapid PI
Silver medal – second place	2015 Singapore	Team Standard PI
Bronze medal – third place	2017 Kuala Lumpur	Individual Rapid PI
Bronze medal – third place	2015 Singapore	Individual Standard PI

Sander de Erit Severino (June 30, 1985 – February 7, 2026) was a Filipino chess player who held the title of FIDE Master. He participated in the 2018 and 2022 Asian Para Games. In 2020, he was crowned the first IPCA (International Physically Disabled Chess Association) Online World Chess Champion.

== Early life ==
Born on June 30, 1985, Sander de Erit Severino was a native of Silay, Negros Occidental. Severino was diagnosed with amyotrophic lateral sclerosis (ALS) when he was eight years old. Both of his legs were paralyzed due to this condition. He was reliant on a wheelchair.

== Career ==
The Silay native started playing chess competitively at age seven and has become a regional champion at age 9 and the National Kiddies Champion at age 11. Severino along with Henry Roger Lopez and Jasper Rom participated at the 2000 Millennium Grand Prix chess tournament sponsored by the Philippine Chess Society. Executive Vice President of the Social Security System Horacio Templo has sponsored the participation of disabled athletes in the chess tournament including the trio who did well in the competition. In late December 2000, Severino won the Asian Continental Under-16 Championship in Bagac, Bataan, with his participation sponsored again by the SSS Thanks to this victory, he earned the title of FIDE Master. FIDE awarded him the title in 2015.

Sander Severino participated in seven editions of the ASEAN Para Games. In the 2017 edition held in Kuala Lumpur he won a gold medal.

At the 2018 Asian Para Games in Jakarta, the chess team which Severino was a part of won most of the ten gold medals won by the whole Philippine contingent. Severino himself won the individual standard P1 and individual rapid P1 events and the team standard P1 and team rapid B1 events along with Lopez and Rom.

In 2020, Severino clinched the International Physically Disabled Chess Association (IPCA) World Online Chess Rapid Championship title becoming the first player representing the Philippines to do so. He was undefeated winning the finals against Igor Yarmonov of Ukraine garnering 8.5 points through 8 victories and a draw.

Severino's last tournament was the 2025 ASEAN Para Games held in Thailand in January 2026, where he won five gold medals and a silver medal. Severino will be posthumously awarded by the Philippine Sportswriters Association during its Awards Night on February 16 at Diamond Hotel in Manila.

== Death ==
After his participation at the 2025 ASEAN Para Games in Thailand, Severino was confined for a week in a hospital. He died from heart failure in Silay, on February 7, 2026, at the age of 40.

== Sources ==
- Sander Severino rating card at FIDE
