= Table tennis at the 2018 Asian Para Games =

Para table tennis at the 2018 Asian Para Games
- Venue: Ecovention
- Location: Ancol, North Jakarta, Indonesia
- Dates: 6–13 October

Para table tennis at the 2018 Asian Para Games was held in Jakarta between 6 and 13 October 2018.

== Medal table ==
* Host nation (Indonesia)

Rank	NPC	Gold	Silver	Bronze	Total
1	China (CHN)	19	6	11	36
2	South Korea (KOR)	9	10	6	25
3	Thailand (THA)	6	6	7	19
4	Indonesia (INA)*	4	4	9	17
5	Hong Kong (HKG)	2	3	5	10
6	Japan (JPN)	1	2	8	11
7	Malaysia (MAS)	1	0	2	3
8	Chinese Taipei (TPE)	0	4	5	9
9	Macau (MAC)	0	2	1	3
10	India (IND)	0	1	0	1
10	Jordan (JOR)	0	1	0	1
10	Korea (COR)	0	1	0	1
10	Kuwait (KUW)	0	1	0	1
10	Philippines (PHI)	0	1	0	1
15	Vietnam (VIE)	0	0	2	2
16	Iran (IRI)	0	0	1	1
16	Iraq (IRQ)	0	0	1	1
16	Timor-Leste (TLS)	0	0	1	1
Totals (18 entries)		42	42	59	143

== Medalists ==
=== Men ===
Event	Class	Gold	Silver	Bronze
Singles	TT 1	Nam Ki-won; South Korea	Hamed Latif; Kuwait	not awarded
Singles	TT 2	Park Jin-cheol; South Korea	Cha Soo-yong; South Korea	Gao Yanming; China
Singles	TT 2	Park Jin-cheol; South Korea	Cha Soo-yong; South Korea	Hassan Janfeshan; Iran
Singles	TT 3	Feng Panfeng; China	Yuttajak Glinbancheun; Thailand	Guo Fei; China
Singles	TT 3	Feng Panfeng; China	Yuttajak Glinbancheun; Thailand	Ko Hang Yee; Hong Kong
Singles	TT 4	Kim Young-gun; South Korea	Kim Jung-gil; South Korea	Zhang Yan; China
Singles	TT 4	Kim Young-gun; South Korea	Kim Jung-gil; South Korea	Adyos Astan; Indonesia
Singles	TT 5	Cao Ningning; China	Cheng Ming-chih; Chinese Taipei	Kim Ki-young; South Korea
Singles	TT 5	Cao Ningning; China	Cheng Ming-chih; Chinese Taipei	Lin Yen-hung; Chinese Taipei
Singles	TT 6	Rungroj Thainiyom; Thailand	Park Hong-kyu; South Korea	Chen Chao; China
Singles	TT 6	Rungroj Thainiyom; Thailand	Park Hong-kyu; South Korea	Rahmad Hidayat; Indonesia
Singles	TT 7	Yan Shuo; China	Chalermpong Punpoo; Thailand	Katsuyoshi Yagi; Japan
Singles	TT 7	Yan Shuo; China	Chalermpong Punpoo; Thailand	Masachika Inoue; Japan
Singles	TT 8	Zhao Shuai; China	Ye Chaoqun; China	Phisit Wangphonphathanasiri; Thailand
Singles	TT 8	Zhao Shuai; China	Ye Chaoqun; China	Hu Ming-fu; Chinese Taipei
Singles	TT 9	Zhao Yiqing; China	Koyo Iwabuchi; Japan	Chee Chaoming; Malaysia
Singles	TT 9	Zhao Yiqing; China	Koyo Iwabuchi; Japan	Wong Chi Yin; Hong Kong
Singles	TT 10	David Jacobs; Indonesia	Lian Hao; China	Azwar Bakar; Malaysia
Singles	TT 10	David Jacobs; Indonesia	Lian Hao; China	Kong Weijie; China
Singles	TT 11	Kim Gi-tae; South Korea	Jeong Kyu-young; South Korea	Yudai Kikawada; Japan
Singles	TT 11	Kim Gi-tae; South Korea	Jeong Kyu-young; South Korea	Toshiya Takahashi; Japan
Doubles	TT 2–3	Thailand; Yuttajak Glinbancheun; Anurak Laowong	Hong Kong; Ko Hang Yee; Choi Siu Hung	Indonesia; Sefrianto; Cahyo Pambudi
Doubles	TT 4–5	Indonesia; Agus Sutanto; Tatok Hardiyanto	Thailand; Wanchai Chaiwut; Niyom Nachai	Indonesia; Adyos Astan; Yayang Gunaya
Doubles	TT 4–5	Indonesia; Agus Sutanto; Tatok Hardiyanto	Thailand; Wanchai Chaiwut; Niyom Nachai	Thailand; Wittaya Wichaiwattana; Jedsada Yodyangdeang
Doubles	TT 6–7	Thailand; Rungroj Thainiyom; Chalermpong Punpoo	Hong Kong; Lee Ming Yip; Chen Si Lu	Thailand; Yuttana Namsaga; Suriyone Thapaeng
Doubles	TT 8–9	Malaysia; Chee Chaoming; Ting Ing Hock	Indonesia; Mohamad Rian Prahasta; Kusnanto	Indonesia; Banyu Tri Mulyo; Wawan Widiantoro
Doubles	TT 10	Indonesia; David Jacobs; Komet Akbar	South Korea; Shin Seung-weon; Jung Suk-youn	Thailand; Bunpot Sillapakong; Chanyut Uthaisar
Team	TT 1–2	South Korea; Cha Soo-yong; Park Jin-cheol	Japan; Mitsuhiro Matsuo; Nobuhiro Minami	not awarded
Team	TT 3	China; Feng Panfeng; Guo Fei	South Korea; Lim Hang-sueng; Baek Young-bok	Chinese Taipei; Wu Cheng-sheng; Yin Chien-ping
Team	TT 4–5	South Korea; Kim Jung-gil; Kim Young-gun	China; Zhang Yan; Cao Ningning	Chinese Taipei; Liang Chen-kun; Lin Wen-hsin
Team	TT 4–5	South Korea; Kim Jung-gil; Kim Young-gun	China; Zhang Yan; Cao Ningning	Chinese Taipei; Cheng Ming-chih; Lin Yen-hung
Team	TT 6–7	China; Yan Shuo; Chen Chao	Korea; Kim Yong-rok; Park Hong-kyu	Japan; Katsuyoshi Yagi; Masachika Inoue
Team	TT 8	China; Zhao Shuai; Ye Chaoqun	Thailand; Parinya Keereerut; Phisit Wangphonphathanasiri	Japan; Takumi Shukunobe; Arufua Tateishi
Team	TT 8	China; Zhao Shuai; Ye Chaoqun	Thailand; Parinya Keereerut; Phisit Wangphonphathanasiri	Vietnam; Võ Quốc Hưng; Phạm Văn Hoàng
Team	TT 9–10	Japan; Nariaki Kakita; Koyo Iwabuchi	China; Lian Hao; Kong Weijie	not awarded
Team	TT 11	South Korea; Kim Gi-tae; Jeong Kyu-young	Hong Kong; Wan Wai Lok; Leung Chung Yan; Tsoi Ming Fa	not awarded

=== Women ===
Event	Class	Gold	Silver	Bronze
Singles	TT 1–3	Xue Juan; China	Li Qian; China	Lee Mi-gyu; South Korea
Singles	TT 1–3	Xue Juan; China	Li Qian; China	Seo Su-yeon; South Korea
Singles	TT 4	Zhou Ying; China	Lu Pi-chun; Chinese Taipei	Zhang Miao; China
Singles	TT 4	Zhou Ying; China	Lu Pi-chun; Chinese Taipei	Wijittra Jaion; Thailand
Singles	TT 5	Zhang Bian; China	Khetam Abuawad; Jordan	Pan Jiamin; China
Singles	TT 5	Zhang Bian; China	Khetam Abuawad; Jordan	Wong Pui Yi; Hong Kong
Singles	TT 6	Lee Kun-woo; South Korea	Lam Oi Man; Macau	Zainab Farttoosi; Iraq
Singles	TT 6	Lee Kun-woo; South Korea	Lam Oi Man; Macau	Pascoela dos Santos Pereira; Timor-Leste
Singles	TT 7	Wang Rui; China	Kim Seong-ok; South Korea	Chiu Kan Shan; Hong Kong
Singles	TT 7	Wang Rui; China	Kim Seong-ok; South Korea	U Choi Hong; Macau
Singles	TT 8	Mao Jingdian; China	Josephine Medina; Philippines	Huang Wenjuan; China
Singles	TT 8	Mao Jingdian; China	Josephine Medina; Philippines	Yuri Tomono; Japan
Singles	TT 9	Xiong Guiyan; China	Kim Kun-hea; South Korea	Chayanan Settisrikoedkun; Thailand
Singles	TT 10	Fan Lei; China	Tien Shiau-wen; Chinese Taipei	Zhao Xiaojing; China
Singles	TT 10	Fan Lei; China	Tien Shiau-wen; Chinese Taipei	Nozomi Takeuchi; Japan
Singles	TT 11	Ng Mui Wui; Hong Kong	Ana Widyasari; Indonesia	Wong Ka Man; Hong Kong
Singles	TT 11	Ng Mui Wui; Hong Kong	Ana Widyasari; Indonesia	Seo Yang-hee; South Korea
Doubles	TT 3–5	Thailand; Dararat Asayut; Pattaravadee Wararitdamrongkul	India; Bhavinaben Patel; Sonalben Patel	China; Zhang Miao; Pan Jiamin
Doubles	TT 6–10	China; Liu Meng; Zhao Xiaojing	South Korea; Kim Kun-hea; Jung Jin-mi	Indonesia; Sella Dwi Radayana; Hana Resti
Doubles	TT 6–10	China; Liu Meng; Zhao Xiaojing	South Korea; Kim Kun-hea; Jung Jin-mi	Thailand; Chayanan Settisrikoedkun; Wachiraporn Thepmoya
Team	TT 2–5	China; Zhang Bian; Zhou Ying	China; Li Qian; Xue Juan	South Korea; Shin Mi-kyoung; Lee Mi-gyu
Team	TT 6–7	South Korea; Kim Seong-ok; Lee Kun-woo	Macau; Lam Oi Man; U Choi Hong	not awarded
Team	TT 8–10	China; Fan Lei; Xiong Guiyan	Chinese Taipei; Tien Shiau-wen; Lin Tzu-yu	China; Mao Jingdian; Wang Rui
Team	TT 8–10	China; Fan Lei; Xiong Guiyan	Chinese Taipei; Tien Shiau-wen; Lin Tzu-yu	Vietnam; Việt Thị Kim Vân; Nguyễn Thị Hoa Phương
Team	TT 11	Hong Kong; Ng Mui Wui; Wong Ka Man; Li Hiu Tung	Indonesia; Ana Widyasari; Lola Amalia	not awarded

=== Mixed ===
Event	Class	Gold	Silver	Bronze
Doubles	TT 2–3	Thailand; Anurak Laowong; Dararat Asayut	Thailand; Wittaya Wichaiwattana; Chilchitparyak Bootwansirina	Indonesia; Sefrianto; Osrita Muslim
Doubles	TT 4–5	Thailand; Wanchai Chaiwut; Wijittra Jaion	South Korea; Kim Ki-young; Kang Oe-jeong	Indonesia; Agus Sutanto; Tarsilem
Doubles	TT 6–8	Indonesia; Mohamad Rian Prahasta; Suwarti	Indonesia; Banyu Tri Mulyo; Hamida	South Korea; Kim Hyeong-gwon; Koh Duk-ja
Doubles	TT 9–10	China; Zhao Yiqing; Liu Meng	Thailand; Bunpot Sillapakong; Wachiraporn Thepmoya	Indonesia; Komet Akbar; Sella Dwi Radayana

== See also ==
- Table tennis at the 2017 ASEAN Para Games
- Table tennis at the 2018 Asian Games
