= Indonesia at the 2018 Asian Para Games =

- IPC code: INA
- NPC: National Paralympic Committee of Indonesia

in Jakarta 6–13 October 2018
- Competitors: 294 in 18 sports
- Flag bearers: Laura Aurelia Dinda Sekar Devanti (opening); Anto Boi (closing)
- Officials: 125
- Medals Ranked 5th: Gold 37 Silver 47 Bronze 51 Total 135

Asian Para Games appearances (overview)
- 2010; 2014; 2018; 2022; 2026

Youth appearances
- 2009; 2013; 2017; 2021

Indonesia hosted and took part in the 2018 Asian Para Games which was held in Jakarta from 6 to 13 October 2018. The Indonesian contingent for the games consisted of 300 athletes and 125 officials. As hosts, Indonesia were targeting to place eight overall in the medal tally and aimed to win at least 16 gold medals.

== Competitors ==
Sport	Men	Women	Total
Archery	7	5	12
Athletics	28	15	43
Badminton	16	6	22
Boccia	7	1	8
Bowling	8	3	11
Chess	9	9	18
Cycling	10	4	14
Goalball	6	5	11
Judo	5	4	9
Lawn bowls	9	9	18
Powerlifting	4	9	13
Shooting	7	4	11
Sitting volleyball	8	8	16
Swimming	18	10	28
Table tennis	20	12	32
Wheelchair basketball	12	0	12
Wheelchair fencing	7	4	11
Wheelchair tennis	4	1	5
Total	185	109	294

== Medalists ==
Medal	Name	Sport	Event	Date
Gold	Fredy Setiawan; Dheva Anrimusthi; Hafizh Briliansyah Prawiranegara; Hary Susanto; Suryo Nugroho; Ukun Rukaendi	Badminton	Men's team standing (SL3–SU5)	07 Oct
Gold	Sapto Yogo Purnomo	Athletics	Men's 200 m T37	08 Oct
Gold	Rica Octavia	Athletics	Women's long jump T20	08 Oct
Gold	Suparniyati	Athletics	Women's shot put F20	08 Oct
Gold	Mella Windasari	Lawn bowls	Women's singles B6	08 Oct
Gold	Dwi Widiantoro	Lawn bowls	Mixed singles B1	08 Oct
Gold	Suwondo	Lawn bowls	Mixed singles B4	08 Oct
Gold	Syuci Indriani	Swimming	Women's 100 m breaststroke SB14	08 Oct
Gold	Sapto Yogo Purnomo	Athletics	Men's 100 m T37	09 Oct
Gold	Elsa Maris	Bowling	Women's singles TPB4	09 Oct
Gold	Julia Verawati	Lawn bowls	Mixed singles B2	09 Oct
Gold	David Jacobs	Table tennis	Men's singles TT10	09 Oct
Gold	Putri Aulia	Athletics	Women's 100 m T13	10 Oct
Gold	Karisma Evi Tiarani	Athletics	Women's 100 m T42/63	10 Oct
Gold	Hendi Wirawan	Chess	Men's individual standard B1	10 Oct
Gold	Hendi Wirawan; Edy Suryanto; Carsidi	Chess	Men's team standard B1	10 Oct
Gold	Nasip Farta Simanja	Chess	Women's individual standard P1	10 Oct
Gold	Debi Ariesta	Chess	Women's individual standard B1	10 Oct
Gold	Nasip Farta Simanja; Roslinda Manurung; Yuni	Chess	Women's team standard P1	10 Oct
Gold	Debi Ariesta; Tati Karhati; Wilma Margaretha Sinaga	Chess	Women's team standard B1	10 Oct
Gold	Agus Sutanto; Tatok Hardiyanto	Table tennis	Men's doubles TT4–5	10 Oct
Gold	David Jacobs; Komet Akbar	Table tennis	Men's doubles TT10	10 Oct
Gold	Mohamad Rian Prahasta; Suwarti	Table tennis	Mixed doubles TT6–8	10 Oct
Gold	Jendi Pangabean	Swimming	Men's 100 m backstroke S9	11 Oct
Gold	Leani Ratri Oktila; Khalimatus Sadiyah	Badminton	Women's doubles SL3–SU5	12 Oct
Gold	Edy Suryanto	Chess	Men's individual rapid B1	12 Oct
Gold	Edy Suryanto; Carsidi; Hendi Wirawan	Chess	Men's team rapid B1	12 Oct
Gold	Gayuh Satrio; Adji Hartono; M. Haryanto	Chess	Men's team rapid B2/3	12 Oct
Gold	Tati Karhati	Chess	Women's individual rapid B1	12 Oct
Gold	Tati Karhati; Debi Ariesta; Wilma Margaretha Sinaga	Chess	Women's team rapid B1	12 Oct
Gold	Fadli Immammuddin	Cycling	Men's individual pursuit C4	12 Oct
Gold	Julia Verawati; Kacung	Lawn bowls	Mixed pairs B2	12 Oct
Gold	Syuci Indriani	Swimming	Women's 200 m individual medley SM14	12 Oct
Gold	Dheva Anrimusthi	Badminton	Men's singles SU5	13 Oct
Gold	Dwiyoko; Fredy Setiawan	Badminton	Men's doubles SL3–SL4	13 Oct
Gold	Dheva Anrimusthi; Hafizh Briliansyah Prawiranegara	Badminton	Men's doubles SU5	13 Oct
Gold	Hary Susanto; Leani Ratri Oktila	Badminton	Mixed doubles SL3–SU5	13 Oct
Silver	Ni Nengah Widiasih	Powerlifting	Women's 41 kg	07 Oct
Silver	Eko Saputra	Athletics	Men's 200 m T12	08 Oct
Silver	Setyo Budi Hartanto	Athletics	Men's long jump T45/46/47	08 Oct
Silver	Saipul Anwar	Cycling	Men's time trial C3	08 Oct
Silver	Fadli Immammuddin	Cycling	Men's time trial C4	08 Oct
Silver	Sufyan Saori	Cycling	Men's time trial C5	08 Oct
Silver	Retnowati Yugia Sibarani	Lawn bowls	Women's singles B6	08 Oct
Silver	Ni'matul Fauziah	Lawn bowls	Mixed singles B1	08 Oct
Silver	Dian Kristiyaningsih	Lawn bowls	Mixed singles B3	08 Oct
Silver	Aris	Swimming	Men's 100 m breaststroke SB7	08 Oct
Silver	Ana Widyasari	Table tennis	Women's singles TT11	08 Oct
Silver	Rizal Bagus Saktiyono	Athletics	Men's 200 m T45/46/47	09 Oct
Silver	Felipus Kolymau	Athletics	Men's 400 m T20	09 Oct
Silver	Karisma Evi Tiarani	Athletics	Women's long jump T42–44/61–64	09 Oct
Silver	Sri Sugiyanti	Cycling	Women's road race B	09 Oct
Silver	Guntur	Swimming	Men's 100 m breaststroke SB8	09 Oct
Silver	Abdul Halim Dalimunte	Athletics	Men's 100 m T11	10 Oct
Silver	Nur Ferry Pradana	Athletics	Men's 100 m T45/46/47	10 Oct
Silver	Ni Made Arianti Putri	Athletics	Women's 100 m T13	10 Oct
Silver	Famini	Athletics	Women's discus throw F56/57	10 Oct
Silver	Andrey Azward; Elsa Maris	Bowling	Mixed doubles TPB4+TPB4	10 Oct
Silver	Maksum Firdaus	Chess	Men's individual standard P1	10 Oct
Silver	Maksum Firdaus; Suhardi Sinaga; Sutikno	Chess	Men's team standard P1	10 Oct
Silver	Tati Karhati	Chess	Women's individual standard B1	10 Oct
Silver	Nurtani Purba	Powerlifting	Women's 73 kg	10 Oct
Silver	Siti Mahmudah	Powerlifting	Women's 79 kg	10 Oct
Silver	Syuci Indriani	Swimming	Women's 100 m butterfly S14	10 Oct
Silver	Mohamad Rian Prahasta; Kusnanto	Table tennis	Men's doubles TT8–9	10 Oct
Silver	Banyu Tri Mulyo; Hamida	Table tennis	Mixed doubles TT6–8	10 Oct
Silver	Nur Ferry Pradana	Athletics	Men's 400 m T45/46/47	11 Oct
Silver	Ni Made Arianti Putri	Athletics	Women's 400 m T13	11 Oct
Silver	Sri Sugiyanti	Cycling	Women's individual pursuit B	11 Oct
Silver	Sriyanti	Powerlifting	Women's +86 kg	11 Oct
Silver	Jaenal Aripin	Athletics	Men's 200 m T54	12 Oct
Silver	Leani Ratri Oktila	Badminton	Women's singles SL4	12 Oct
Silver	Gayuh Satrio	Chess	Men's individual rapid B2/3	12 Oct
Silver	Sutikno; Maksum Firdaus; Suhardi Sinaga	Chess	Men's team rapid P1	12 Oct
Silver	Saipul Anwar	Cycling	Men's individual pursuit C3	12 Oct
Silver	Sufyan Saori	Cycling	Men's individual pursuit C5	12 Oct
Silver	Euis Rahayu Efendi; Suwondo	Lawn bowls	Mixed pairs B4	12 Oct
Silver	Jendi Pangabean	Swimming	Men's 100 m butterfly S9	12 Oct
Silver	Ana Widyasari; Lola Amalia	Table tennis	Women's team TT11	12 Oct
Silver	Ukun Rukaendi	Badminton	Men's singles SL3	13 Oct
Silver	Fredy Setiawan	Badminton	Men's singles SL4	13 Oct
Silver	Suryo Nugroho	Badminton	Men's singles SU5	13 Oct
Silver	Suryo Nugroho; Oddie Kurnia Dwi Listyanto Putra	Badminton	Men's doubles SU5	13 Oct
Silver	Sri Sugiyanti	Cycling	Women's kilo B	13 Oct
Bronze	Syuci Indriani	Swimming	Women's 200 m freestyle S14	07 Oct
Bronze	Abdul Halim Dalimunte	Athletics	Men's 200 m T11	08 Oct
Bronze	Alan Sastra Ginting	Athletics	Men's discus throw F57	08 Oct
Bronze	Tiwa	Athletics	Women's shot put F20	08 Oct
Bronze	Herman Halawa	Cycling	Men's time trial B	08 Oct
Bronze	Somantri	Cycling	Men's time trial H4–5	08 Oct
Bronze	Sri Sugiyanti	Cycling	Women's time trial B	08 Oct
Bronze	Ni Kadek Karyadewi	Cycling	Women's time trial H2–4	08 Oct
Bronze	Sriyanti	Lawn bowls	Women's singles B7	08 Oct
Bronze	Rani Puji Astuti	Powerlifting	Women's 55 kg	08 Oct
Bronze	Jendi Pangabean	Swimming	Men's 100 m freestyle S9	08 Oct
Bronze	Adyos Astan	Table tennis	Men's singles TT4	08 Oct
Bronze	Endi Nurdin Tine	Athletics	Men's 400 m T20	09 Oct
Bronze	Elvin Elhudia Sesa	Athletics	Women's 400 m T20	09 Oct
Bronze	Martin Losu	Cycling	Men's road race C5	09 Oct
Bronze	Somantri	Cycling	Men's road race H4–5	09 Oct
Bronze	Zaki Zulkarnain	Swimming	Men's 100 m breaststroke SB8	09 Oct
Bronze	Rahmad Hidayat	Table tennis	Men's singles TT6	09 Oct
Bronze	Suwarsih; Sri Lestari; Elih; Survaya Dewi Ningrum	Wheelchair fencing	Women's team sabre	09 Oct
Bronze	Mulyono	Athletics	Men's long jump T42/61/63	10 Oct
Bronze	Endang Sari Sitorus	Athletics	Women's 100 m T13	10 Oct
Bronze	Edy Suryanto	Chess	Men's individual standard B1	10 Oct
Bronze	Gayuh Satrio; Adji Hartono; M. Haryanto	Chess	Men's team standard B2/3	10 Oct
Bronze	Roslinda Manurung	Chess	Women's individual standard P1	10 Oct
Bronze	I Wayan Damai	Lawn bowls	Men's singles B6	10 Oct
Bronze	Asep Darmawan	Lawn bowls	Men's singles B7	10 Oct
Bronze	Sudarno	Lawn bowls	Men's singles B8	10 Oct
Bronze	Sefrianto; Cahyo Pambudi	Table tennis	Men's doubles TT2–3	10 Oct
Bronze	Adyos Astan; Yayang Gunaya	Table tennis	Men's doubles TT4–5	10 Oct
Bronze	Banyu Tri Mulyo; Wawan Widiantoro	Table tennis	Men's doubles TT8–9	10 Oct
Bronze	Sella Dwi Radayana; Hana Resti	Table tennis	Women's doubles TT6–10	10 Oct
Bronze	Sefrianto; Osrita Muslim	Table tennis	Mixed doubles TT2–3	10 Oct
Bronze	Agus Sutanto; Tarsilem	Table tennis	Mixed doubles TT4–5	10 Oct
Bronze	Komet Akbar; Sella Dwi Radayana	Table tennis	Mixed doubles TT9–10	10 Oct
Bronze	Eko Saputra	Athletics	Men's 400 m T12	11 Oct
Bronze	Herman Halawa	Cycling	Men's individual pursuit B	11 Oct
Bronze	Habib Shaleh; Fadli Immammuddin; Martin Losu	Cycling	Men's team sprint C1–5	11 Oct
Bronze	Ni Nengah Widiasih	Powerlifting	Women's 86 kg	11 Oct
Bronze	Guntur; Jendi Pangabean; Tangkilisan Steven Sualang; Suriansyah	Swimming	Men's 4 × 100 m medley relay 34 points	11 Oct
Bronze	Rasyidi	Athletics	Men's long jump T44/62/64	12 Oct
Bronze	Putri Aulia; Karisma Evi Tiarani; Sapto Yogo Purnomo; Jaenal Aripin	Athletics	Mixed 4 × 100 m universal relay	12 Oct
Bronze	Khalimatus Sadiyah	Badminton	Women's singles SL4	12 Oct
Bronze	Carsidi	Chess	Men's individual rapid B1	12 Oct
Bronze	Nasip Farta Simanja; Yuni; Roslinda Manurung	Chess	Women's team rapid P1	12 Oct
Bronze	Aisah Wijayanti Brahmana; Khairunnisa; Tita Puspita	Chess	Women's team rapid B2/3	12 Oct
Bronze	Mella Windasari; I Wayan Damai	Lawn bowls	Mixed pairs B6	12 Oct
Bronze	Sriyanti; Sukirman	Lawn bowls	Mixed pairs B7	12 Oct
Bronze	Tangkilisan Steven Sualang	Swimming	Men's 100 m backstroke S10	12 Oct
Bronze	Hikmat Ramdani	Badminton	Men's singles SL4	13 Oct
Bronze	Oddie Kurnia Dwi Listyanto Putra	Badminton	Men's singles SU5	13 Oct
Bronze	Hikmat Ramdani; Khalimatus Sadiyah	Badminton	Mixed doubles SL3–SU5	13 Oct

Medals by sport
Sport	1st place, gold medalist(s)	2nd place, silver medalist(s)	3rd place, bronze medalist(s)	Total
Athletics	6	12	10	28
Badminton	6	5	4	15
Bowling	1	1	0	2
Chess	11	5	6	22
Cycling	1	8	8	17
Lawn bowls	5	4	6	15
Powerlifting	0	4	2	6
Swimming	3	4	5	12
Table tennis	4	4	9	17
Wheelchair fencing	0	0	1	1
Total	37	47	51	135

Medals by day
Day	Date	1st place, gold medalist(s)	2nd place, silver medalist(s)	3rd place, bronze medalist(s)	Total
1	October 7	1	1	1	3
2	October 8	7	10	11	28
3	October 9	4	5	7	16
4	October 10	11	13	15	39
5	October 11	1	4	5	10
6	October 12	9	9	9	27
7	October 13	4	5	3	12
Total		37	47	51	135

== See also ==
- Indonesia at the 2018 Asian Games
