= Myanmar at the 2018 Asian Para Games =

- IPC code: MYA
- NPC: Myanmar Paralympic Sports Federation

in Jakarta 6–13 October
- Medals Ranked 27th: Gold 0 Silver 4 Bronze 2 Total 6

Asian Para Games appearances (overview)
- 2010; 2014; 2018; 2022

Myanmar participated in the 2018 Asian Para Games in Jakarta, Indonesia, from 6 to 13 October 2018. Athletes from Myanmar competed in Athletics, Chess, Sitting Volleyball and Swimming. Myanmar won 4 silver medals, 2 bronze medals and finished 27th in the medal table.

== Medal summary ==
=== Medalists ===
Medal	Name	Sport	Event
Silver	Kaung San	Chess	Individual standard
Silver	Kaung San; Myo San Aung; Than Htay	Chess	Team standard
Silver	Kyaw Htoo	Swimming	50 m backstroke
Silver	Aung Myint Myat	Swimming	100 m backstroke
Bronze	Aung Myint Myat	Swimming	50 m freestyle
Bronze	Aung Nyein Oo	Swimming	100 m breaststroke

Medals by sport
Sport	1st place, gold medalist(s)	2nd place, silver medalist(s)	3rd place, bronze medalist(s)	Total
Chess	0	2	0	2
Swimming	0	2	2	4
Total	0	4	2	6
