= Trịnh Thị Bích Như =

Vietnamese Paralympic swimmer

Medal record

Swimming

Representing Vietnam

Asian Para Games
Bronze medal – third place	2018 Jakarta	Women's 100m Freestyle - S6
Bronze medal – third place	2018 Jakarta	Women's 50m Freestyle - S6
Bronze medal – third place	2018 Jakarta	Women's 50m Butterfly - S7 (2–7)

ASEAN Para Games
Gold medal – first place	2017 Malaysia	Women's 100m backstroke - SB5
Gold medal – first place	2017 Malaysia	Women's 50 m freestyle - S7
Gold medal – first place	2015 Singapore	Women's 50 m freestyle - S6
Gold medal – first place	2015 Singapore	Women's 50 m freestyle - SB6

Trịnh Thị Bích Như (born 15 October 1985) is a Vietnamese female Paralympic swimmer.

In the 2012 Summer Paralympics in London she competed in the Women's 100m Breaststroke - SB5.
