= Thailand at the 2018 Asian Para Games =

- IPC code: THA
- NPC: Paralympic Committee of Thailand

in Jakarta 6–13 October 2018
- Competitors: 237
- Medals Ranked 7th: Gold 23 Silver 33 Bronze 50 Total 106

Asian Para Games appearances (overview)
- 2010; 2014; 2018; 2022

Thailand participated at the 2018 Asian Para Games which was held in Jakarta, Indonesia from 6 to 13 October 2018.

== Medals by sport ==
Medals by sport
Sport	1st place, gold medalist(s)	2nd place, silver medalist(s)	3rd place, bronze medalist(s)	Total
Athletics	11	10	13	34
Badminton	0	4	5	9
Boccia	3	2	1	6
Bowling	0	0	5	5
Powerlifting	0	0	1	1
Shooting	2	2	1	5
Swimming	0	4	12	16
Table tennis	6	6	7	19
Wheelchair basketball	0	0	1	1
Wheelchair fencing	1	5	3	9
Wheelchair tennis	0	0	1	1
Total	23	33	50	106

== See also ==
- Thailand at the 2018 Asian Games
