= Kazakhstan at the 2018 Asian Para Games =

- Flag of Kazakhstan
- IPC code: KAZ
- NPC: National Paralympic Committee of Kazakhstan

in Jakarta 6–13 October 2018
- Competitors: 90 in 9 sports
- Flag bearer: Anuar Akhmetov
- Medals Ranked 13th: Gold 5 Silver 15 Bronze 13 Total 33

Asian Para Games appearances
- 2010; 2014; 2018; 2022

Kazakhstan participated at the 2018 Asian Para Games which was held in Jakarta, Indonesia from 6 to 13 October 2018. The Kazakhstani delegation was composed of 90 athletes who competed in nine sports, namely: table tennis, para judo, para swimming, shooting para sports, para powerlifting, archery, chess, para athletics and sitting volleyball.

== Medalists ==
Medal	Name	Sport	Event	Date
Gold	Yerzhan Salimgereyev	Swimming	Men's 100m Freestyle S6	09 Oct
Gold	Siyazbek Daliev	Swimming	Men's 50m Butterfly S5 (2–5)	09 Oct
Gold	Zulfiya Gabidullina	Swimming	Women's 100m Freestyle S4 (1–4)	09 Oct
Gold	Yerzhan Salimgereyev	Swimming	Men's 50m Freestyle S6	10 Oct
Gold	Dmitriy Li	Swimming	Men's 400m Freestyle S10	11 Oct
Silver	Azamat Turumbetov	Judo	Men's 66 kg	08 Oct
Silver	David Degtyarev	Powerlifting	Men's 54 kg	08 Oct
Silver	Dmitriy Li	Swimming	Men's 100m Freestyle S10	08 Oct
Silver	Zulfiya Gabidullina	Swimming	Women's 50m Backstroke S4 (1–4)	08 Oct
Silver	Raushan Koishibayeva	Powerlifting	Women's 67 kg	09 Oct
Silver	Dmitriy Li	Swimming	Men's 200m Individual Medley SM10	09 Oct
Silver	Ravil Mansurbayev	Athletics	Men's Shot Put F46	10 Oct
Silver	Sergey Kinakh	Swimming	Men's 100m Breaststroke SB9	10 Oct
Silver	Anuar Akhmetov	Swimming	Men's 100m Breaststroke SB13 (12–13)	10 Oct
Silver	Sergey Kinakh	Swimming	Men's 50m Freestyle S10	10 Oct
Silver	Rakhmetzhan Khamayev	Powerlifting	Men's 88 kg	11 Oct
Silver	Mansurbek Ibrashev	Swimming	Men's 100m Backstroke S11	11 Oct
Silver	Zulfiya Gabidullina	Swimming	Women's 50m Freestyle S4 (1–4)	11 Oct
Silver	Bolat Kabyzhanov	Chess	Men's Individual Rapid VI - B1	12 Oct
Silver	Anuar Akhmetov	Swimming	Men's 50m Freestyle S12	12 Oct
Bronze	Alina Solodukhina	Powerlifting	Women's 45 kg	07 Oct
Bronze	Dmitriy Li	Swimming	Men's 100m Butterfly S10	07 Oct
Bronze	Gulbanu Abdykhalykova	Powerlifting	Women's 50 kg	08 Oct
Bronze	Mansurbek Ibrashev	Swimming	Men's 100m Freestyle S11	08 Oct
Bronze	Siyazbek Daliev	Swimming	Men's 50m Backstroke S5	08 Oct
Bronze	Temirzhan Daulet	Judo	Men's 73 kg	09 Oct
Bronze	Ivan Zaleznyak	Athletics	Men's Shot Put F36	10 Oct
Bronze	Dmitriy Li	Swimming	Men's 50m Freestyle S10	10 Oct
Bronze	Zulfiya Gabidullina	Swimming	Women's 200m Freestyle S5 (1–5)	10 Oct
Bronze	Sergey Kharlamov	Athletics	Men's Long Jump T36	11 Oct
Bronze	Anuar Sariyev; Azamat Turumbetov; Temirzhan Daulet; Temirbolat Tashekenov; Yergali Shamey	Judo	Men's Team	11 Oct
Bronze	Yerlan Bitemirov; Alexandr Demeuov; Berik Izmaganbetov; Turlan Karatayev; Erik Kaskabayev; Almat Manabayev; Shyngys Medeuov; Nurtau Mukanbetkaliyev; Perdebay Namuratov; Bauyrzhan Sartayev; Akylbek Shikibayev; Zhangali Suieuov; Bauyrzhan Takhauov	Sitting volleyball	Men's competition	11 Oct
Bronze	Alina Dubinina	Swimming	Women's 100m Freestyle S8	11 Oct

== Medals by sport ==
Medals by sport
Sport	1st place, gold medalist(s)	2nd place, silver medalist(s)	3rd place, bronze medalist(s)	Total
Athletics	0	1	2	3
Chess	0	1	0	1
Judo	0	1	2	3
Powerlifting	0	3	2	5
Sitting volleyball	0	0	1	1
Swimming	5	9	6	20
Total	5	15	13	33

== Medals by day ==
Medals by day
Day	Date	1st place, gold medalist(s)	2nd place, silver medalist(s)	3rd place, bronze medalist(s)	Total
1	October 7	0	0	2	2
2	October 8	0	4	3	7
3	October 9	3	2	1	6
4	October 10	1	4	3	8
5	October 11	1	3	4	8
6	October 12	0	2	0	2
7	October 13	0	0	0	0
Total		5	15	13	33

== See also ==
- Kazakhstan at the 2018 Asian Games
