= Chan Yui-lam =

Hong Kong Paralympic swimmer

Medal record

Women's para-swimming

Representing Hong Kong

Paralympic Games
Silver medal – second place	2024 Paris	100 m butterfly S14

Asian Para Games
Gold medal – first place	2022 Hangzhou	100 m backstroke S14
Gold medal – first place	2022 Hangzhou	100 m butterfly S14
Silver medal – second place	2022 Hangzhou	100 m breaststroke SB14
Silver medal – second place	2022 Hangzhou	200 m ind. medley SM14
Silver medal – second place	2022 Hangzhou	Mixed 4×100 m freestyle relay S14

World Championships
Gold medal – first place	2023 Manchester	100 m butterfly S14
Bronze medal – third place	2019 London	100 m butterfly S14

Chan Yui-lam (Chinese: 陳睿琳; born 17 October 2003) is a Hong Kong swimmer, who won silver in the 100 m butterfly S14 at the 2024 Summer Paralympics in Paris.
