= Wheelchair basketball at the 2018 Asian Para Games =

- Venue: Gelora Bung Karno Basketball Hall
- Location: Central Jakarta, Jakarta, Indonesia
- Dates: 6–13 October

Medalists
gold medal	Iran (men); China (women)
silver medal	Japan (men & women)
bronze medal	South Korea (men); Thailand (women)

Wheelchair basketball was one of the events featured at the 2018 Asian Para Games, which took place in Jakarta, Indonesia from 6 to 13 October 2018.

== Qualification ==
Men's

Means of qualification	Date	Venue	Berths	Qualified
Host nation	—N/a		1	Indonesia
Automatic qualification	—N/a		3	Iran; Japan; South Korea
Central and East Asia Qualifying Tournament	4–10 March 2018	(Thailand) Bangkok	4	China; Thailand; Malaysia; Chinese Taipei
West Asia Qualifying Tournament	23–26 April 2018	(Jordan) Amman	2	Iraq; Saudi Arabia

Women's

Means of qualification	Date	Venue	Berths	Qualified
Automatic qualification	—N/a		2	China; Japan
Central and East Asia Qualifying Tournament	5–10 March 2018	(Thailand) Bangkok	4	Iran; Thailand; Afghanistan; Cambodia

== Results ==
=== Men's tournament ===
Men's wheelchair basketball at the 2018 Asian Para Games
- Venue: Gelora Bung Karno Basketball Hall
- Location: Central Jakarta, Jakarta, Indonesia
- Dates: 7–13 October
- Nations: 10

Medalists
gold medal	Iran
silver medal	Japan
bronze medal	South Korea

==== Preliminary round ====
===== Group A =====
Pos	Team	Pld	W	L	PF	PA	PD	Pts	Qualification
1	Iran (IRI)	4	4	0	384	158	+226	8	Advance to Semi-finals
2	China (CHN)	4	3	1	304	223	+81	7	Advance to Semi-finals
3	Thailand (THA)	4	2	2	257	220	+37	6	Qualified for the Fifth place game
4	Iraq (IRQ)	4	1	3	240	276	−36	5	Qualified for the Seventh place game
5	Indonesia (INA) (H)	4	0	4	74	382	−308	4	Qualified for the Ninth place game

Rules for classification: 1) Points; 2) Head-to-head results; 3) Points difference; 4) Points scored.
(H) Hosts

====== Fixtures ======
7 October
09:30 UTC+7

Boxscore

Iraq	54–81	China
Scoring by quarter: 10–29, 18–17, 14–15, 12–20

7 October
11:30 UTC+7

Boxscore

Iran	117–17	Indonesia
Scoring by quarter: 38–4, 18–7, 29–2, 32–4

8 October
17:30 UTC+7

Boxscore

Thailand	81–59	Iraq
Scoring by quarter: 17–10, 25–14, 21–16, 18–19

8 October
19:30 UTC+7

Boxscore

China	55–91	Iran
Scoring by quarter: 10–24, 16–22, 12–29, 17–16

9 October
13:30 UTC+7

Boxscore

Iran	89–56	Thailand
Scoring by quarter: 25–11, 18–8, 23–26, 23–11

9 October
15:30 UTC+7

Boxscore

Indonesia	20–106	China
Scoring by quarter: 6–18, 4–37, 6–22, 4–29

10 October
09:30 UTC+7

Boxscore

Thailand	62–10	Indonesia
Scoring by quarter: 20–4, 10–3, 20–0, 12–3

10 October
11:30 UTC+7

Boxscore

Iraq	30–87	Iran
Scoring by quarter: 10–23, 6–24, 7–14, 7–26

11 October
13:30 UTC+7

Boxscore

Indonesia	27–97	Iraq
Scoring by quarter: 6–31, 4–22, 10–32, 7–12

11 October
15:30 UTC+7

Boxscore

China	62–58	Thailand
Scoring by quarter: 13–13, 19–13, 12–15, 18–17

===== Group B =====
Pos	Team	Pld	W	L	PF	PA	PD	Pts	Qualification
1	Japan (JPN)	4	4	0	358	151	+207	8	Advance to Semi-finals
2	South Korea (KOR)	4	3	1	336	206	+130	7	Advance to Semi-finals
3	Chinese Taipei (TPE)	4	2	2	196	281	−85	6	Qualified for the Fifth place game
4	Saudi Arabia (KSA)	4	1	3	181	303	−122	5	Qualified for the Seventh place game
5	Malaysia (MAS)	4	0	4	175	305	−130	4	Qualified for the Ninth place game

Rules for classification: 1) Points; 2) Head-to-head results; 3) Points difference; 4) Points scored.

====== Fixtures ======
7 October
17:30 UTC+7

Boxscore

Malaysia	47–60	Chinese Taipei
Scoring by quarter: 10–14, 10–20, 6–16, 21–10

7 October
19:30 UTC+7

Boxscore

Saudi Arabia	26–87	Japan
Scoring by quarter: 10–21, 4–22, 8–23, 4–21

8 October
13:30 UTC+7

Boxscore

South Korea	90–40	Malaysia
Scoring by quarter: 25–6, 20–18, 28–6, 17–10

8 October
15:30 UTC+7

Boxscore

Chinese Taipei	71–56	Saudi Arabia
Scoring by quarter: 21–20, 18–13, 13–12, 19–11

9 October
09:30 UTC+7

Boxscore

Saudi Arabia	39–96	South Korea
Scoring by quarter: 7–25, 10–19, 8–28, 14–24

9 October
11:30 UTC+7

Boxscore

Japan	95–19	Chinese Taipei
Scoring by quarter: 20–3, 27–2, 26–9, 22–5

10 October
13:30 UTC+7

Boxscore

Malaysia	49–60	Saudi Arabia
Scoring by quarter: 14–9, 10–14, 12–15, 13–22

10 October
15:30 UTC+7

Boxscore

South Korea	67–81	Japan
Scoring by quarter: 26–15, 15–18, 18–19, 8–29

11 October
09:30 UTC+7

Boxscore

Chinese Taipei	46–83	South Korea
Scoring by quarter: 10–23, 8–19, 13–21, 15–20

11 October
11:30 UTC+7

Boxscore

Japan	95–39	Malaysia
Scoring by quarter: 20–13, 20–4, 23–12, 32–10

==== Final round ====
Semi-finals
12 October 15:30
Iran	87
South Korea	50
12 October 17:30
Japan	81
China	53

Gold medal game
13 October 11:30
Iran	68
Japan	66
Bronze medal game
13 October 09:30
South Korea	79
China	51

===== Ninth place game =====
12 October
09:30 UTC+7

Boxscore

Indonesia	23–79	Malaysia
Scoring by quarter: 6–26, 6–21, 9–14, 2–18

===== Seventh place game =====
12 October
11:30 UTC+7

Boxscore

Iraq	74–49	Saudi Arabia
Scoring by quarter: 18–11, 16–18, 11–9, 29–11

===== Fifth place game =====
12 October
13:30 UTC+7

Boxscore

Thailand	70–55	Chinese Taipei
Scoring by quarter: 12–8, 14–13, 16–15, 28–19

===== Semi-finals =====
12 October
15:30 UTC+7

Boxscore

Iran	87–50	South Korea
Scoring by quarter: 21–14, 21–8, 22–10, 23–18

12 October
17:30 UTC+7

Boxscore

Japan	81–53	China
Scoring by quarter: 25–10, 16–15, 24–15, 16–13

===== Bronze medal game =====
13 October
09:30 UTC+7

Boxscore

South Korea	79–51	China
Scoring by quarter: 25–14, 13–8, 19–17, 22–12

===== Gold medal game =====
13 October
11:30 UTC+7

Boxscore

Iran	68–66	Japan
Scoring by quarter: 12–21, 20–17, 21–15, 15–13

=== Women's tournament ===
Women's wheelchair basketball at the 2018 Asian Para Games
- Venue: Gelora Bung Karno Basketball Hall
- Location: Central Jakarta, Jakarta, Indonesia
- Dates: 6–12 October
- Nations: 6

Medalists
gold medal	China
silver medal	Japan
bronze medal	Thailand

==== Preliminary round ====
===== Group A =====
Pos	Team	Pld	W	L	PF	PA	PD	Pts	Qualification
1	China (CHN)	2	2	0	210	32	+178	4	Advanced to Semi-finals
2	Iran (IRI)	2	1	1	104	112	−8	3	Advanced to Quarter-finals
3	Cambodia (CAM)	2	0	2	32	202	−170	2	Advanced to Quarter-finals

Rules for classification: 1) Points; 2) Head-to-head results; 3) Points difference; 4) Points scored.

====== Fixtures ======
6 October
09:30 UTC+7

Boxscore

China	94–18	Iran
Scoring by quarter: 23–2, 30–0, 20–10, 21–6

7 October
15:30 UTC+7

Boxscore

Cambodia	18–86	Iran
Scoring by quarter: 0–17, 10–20, 4–24, 4–25

8 October
11:30 UTC+7

Boxscore

China	116–14	Cambodia
Scoring by quarter: 32–4, 31–8, 27–0, 26–2

===== Group B =====
Pos	Team	Pld	W	L	PF	PA	PD	Pts	Qualification
1	Japan (JPN)	2	2	0	191	42	+149	4	Advanced to Semi-finals
2	Thailand (THA)	2	1	1	67	131	−64	3	Advanced to Quarter-finals
3	Afghanistan (AFG)	2	0	2	61	155	−94	2	Advanced to Quarter-finals

Rules for classification: 1) Points; 2) Head-to-head results; 3) Points difference; 4) Points scored.

====== Fixtures ======
6 October
11:30 UTC+7

Boxscore

Japan	88–24	Thailand
Scoring by quarter: 24–8, 20–2, 16–5, 28–9

7 October
13:30 UTC+7

Boxscore

Afghanistan	43–52	Thailand
Scoring by quarter: 11–6, 10–21, 14–15, 8–10

8 October
09:30 UTC+7

Boxscore

Japan	103–18	Afghanistan
Scoring by quarter: 26–6, 26–5, 33–3, 18–4

==== Final round ====
Quarter-finals
B2	Thailand	60
A3	Cambodia	24
A2	Iran	49
B3	Afghanistan	13

Semi-finals
A1	China	95
QF1	Thailand	11
B1	Japan	96
QF2	Iran	27
Fifth place match
QX1	Cambodia	36
QX2	Afghanistan	54

Gold medal match
SF1	China	65
SF2	Japan	35
Bronze medal match
SX1	Thailand	41
SX2	Iran	40

===== Quarter-finals =====
9 October
17:30 UTC+7

Boxscore

Thailand	60–24	Cambodia
Scoring by quarter: 18–8, 14–7, 16–3, 12–6

9 October
19:30 UTC+7

Boxscore

Iran	49–13	Afghanistan
Scoring by quarter: 16–2, 12–2, 9–2, 12–7

===== Semi-finals =====
10 October
17:30 UTC+7

Boxscore

China	95–11	Thailand
Scoring by quarter: 22–5, 26–0, 35–4, 12–2

10 October
19:30 UTC+7

Boxscore

Japan	96–27	Iran
Scoring by quarter: 26–6, 25–12, 20–2, 25–7

===== Fifth place game =====
11 October
17:30 UTC+7

Boxscore

Cambodia	36–54	Afghanistan
Scoring by quarter: 4–17, 10–12, 12–11, 10–14

===== Bronze medal game =====
11 October
19:30 UTC+7

Boxscore

Thailand	41–40	Iran
Scoring by quarter: 13–12, 7–6, 7–13, 14–9

===== Gold medal game =====
12 October
19:30 UTC+7

Boxscore

China	65–35	Japan
Scoring by quarter: 13–8, 16–9, 20–14, 16–4

== Final standings ==
Men's tournament
Rank	Team	Pld	W	L
1st place, gold medalist(s)	Iran	6	6	0
2nd place, silver medalist(s)	Japan	6	5	1
3rd place, bronze medalist(s)	South Korea	6	4	2
4	China	6	3	3
5	Thailand	5	3	2
6	Chinese Taipei	5	2	3
7	Iraq	5	2	3
8	Saudi Arabia	5	1	4
9	Malaysia	5	1	4
10	Indonesia	5	0	5

Women's tournament
Rank	Team	Pld	W	L
1st place, gold medalist(s)	China	4	4	0
2nd place, silver medalist(s)	Japan	4	3	1
3rd place, bronze medalist(s)	Thailand	5	3	2
4	Iran	5	2	3
5	Afghanistan	4	1	3
6	Cambodia	4	0	4

== Medalists ==
Event	Gold	Silver	Bronze
Men	Iran; Hassan Abdi; Morteza Abedi; Morteza Ebrahimi; Abdoljalil Gharanjik; Omid Hadiazhar; Hakim Mansouri; Mohammad Nezhad; Vahid Saadatpoor Moghadam; Mohammadhasan Sayari; Mohammad Sehi; Mohsen Tolouei Tamardash; Adel Torfi Meneshdi	Japan; Ryuga Akaishi; Kei Akita; Renshi Chokai; Reo Fujimoto; Takuya Furusawa; Takayoshi Iwai; Rin Kawahara; Hiroaki Kozai; Tetsuya Miyajima; Naohiro Murakami; Akira Toyoshima; Daisuke Tsuchiko	South Korea; Cho Seung-hyun; Gim Dong-hyeon; Hwang Woo-sung; Jang Kyung-sik; Kim Tae-ok; Kwak Jun-seong; Lee Byoung-jai; Lee Chi-won; Lee Youn-joo; Lim Dong-ju; Oh Dong-suk; Yang Dong-gil
Women	China; Chen Wenli; Chen Xuejing; Cheng Haizhen; Dai Jiameng; Huang Xiaolian; Lin Suiling; Long Yun; Lü Guidi; Zhang Tonglei; Zhang Xuemei	Japan; Mari Amimoto; Ikumi Fujii; Mayo Hagino; Chihiro Kitada; Yui Kitama; Rie Odajima; Chinami Shimizu; Momoko Suzuki; Mayumi Tsuchida; Amane Yanagimoto; Emi Yasuo; Izumi Zaima	Thailand; Wadsamon Budpo; Pawarati Jala; Numthip Jalunporlessin; Porntip Kachunram; Tananya Kaewmak; Nuttaporn Lasopa; Sukanya Pandongyang; Netnapa Ponil; Thipaksorn Singkaew; Anurak Sirinikorn; Nopparat Tanbut; Parichat Yamarun

== See also ==
- Basketball at the 2018 Asian Games
