= Japan at the 2018 Asian Para Games =

- IPC code: JPN
- NPC: Japan Paralympic Committee

in Jakarta 6–13 October 2018
- Competitors: 303 in 17 sports
- Flag bearer: Kaede Maegawa
- Medals Ranked 4th: Gold 45 Silver 70 Bronze 83 Total 198

Asian Para Games appearances (overview)
- 2010; 2014; 2018; 2022; 2026

Japan participated at the 2018 Asian Para Games in Jakarta, Indonesia from 6 to 13 October 2018. Its delegation was composed of 303 athletes. Kaede Maegawa from athletics served as the nation's flag-bearer during the opening ceremony. Athletes from Japan achieved a total of 198 medals, including 45 gold, and finished fourth at the medal table behind China, South Korea, and Iran.

== Medalists ==
The following Japan competitors won medals at the Games.

Medal	Name	Sport	Event	Date
Gold	Amisa Kitano	Swimming	Women's 200 m freestyle S14	7 October
Gold	Takuro Yamada	Swimming	Men's 200 m individual medley SM9	7 October
Gold	Airi Ike	Swimming	Women's 100 m butterfly S10	7 October
Gold	Mikuni Utsugi	Swimming	Women's 100 m breaststroke SB8	7 October
Gold	Tomotaro Nakamura; Erika Nara; Mayumi Narita; Takayuki Suzuki	Swimming	Mixed 4 × 50 m freestyle relay 20 points	7 October
Gold	Kazuhei Kimura	Cycling	Men's road time trial B	8 October
Gold	Yasuhiro Tanaka	Swimming	Men's 100 m breaststroke SB14	8 October
Gold	Uchu Tomita	Swimming	Men's 100 m freestyle S11	8 October
Gold	Takuro Yamada	Swimming	Men's 100 m freestyle S9	8 October
Gold	Daiki Kubo; Kota Kubota; Kotaro Ogiwara; Takuro Yamada	Swimming	Men's 4 × 100 m freestyle relay 34 points	8 October
Gold	Keiichi Kimura	Swimming	Men's 200 m individual medley SM11	9 October
Gold	Tatsuya Ito	Athletics	Men's 100 m T51/52	9 October
Gold	Takayuki Suzuki	Swimming	Men's 100 m freestyle S1-4	9 October
Gold	Keita Sato	Athletics	Men's 200 m T44/T62/T64	9 October
Gold	Kasumi Fukui	Swimming	Women's 100 m backstroke S14	9 October
Gold	Maya Nakanishi	Athletics	Women's long jump T42-44/61-64	9 October
Gold	Daisuke Ejima	Swimming	Men's 100 m backstroke S7	10 October
Gold	Yukihito Kumeta	Swimming	Men's 100 m backstroke S1-2	10 October
Gold	Shunsuke Itani	Athletics	Men's 100 m T44/62/64	10 October
Gold	Takayuki Suzuki	Swimming	Men's 200 m freestyle S1-4	10 October
Gold	Uran Sawada	Athletics	Women's 100 m T12	10 October
Gold	Dai Tokairin	Swimming	Men's 100 m butterfly S14	10 October
Gold	Teruyo Tanaka	Athletics	Women's 100 m T52	10 October
Gold	Kazuhei Kimura	Cycling	Men's pursuit B	11 October
Gold	Mitsuteru Moroishi; Koji Sugeno	Wheelchair tennis	Quad doubles	11 October
Gold	Keiko Noguchi	Cycling	Women's pursuit C2–5	11 October
Gold	Shingo Kunieda; Takashi Sanada	Wheelchair tennis	Men's doubles	11 October
Gold	Keiichi Kimura	Swimming	Men's 100 m backstroke S11	11 October
Gold	Daiki Kubo	Swimming	Men's 100 m butterfly S9	11 October
Gold	Tomoki Sato	Athletics	Men's 400 m T52	11 October
Gold	Takayuki Suzuki	Swimming	Men's 50 m freestyle S1-4	11 October
Gold	Tomoya Ito	Athletics	Men's 200 m T51/52	11 October
Gold	Mana Sasaki	Athletics	Women's 400 m T13	11 October
Gold	Koyo Iwabuchi; Nariaki Kakita	Table tennis	Men's team TT9-10	12 October
Gold	Keiichi Kimura	Swimming	Men's 50 m freestyle S11	12 October
Gold	Takayuki Suzuki	Swimming	Men's 50 m breaststroke SB1-3	12 October
Gold	Eiko Kakehata; Masae Komiya; Tomoe Takada; Yuki Temma; Rie Urata; Haruka Wakasugi	Goalball	Women's tournament	12 October
Gold	Yui Kamiji	Wheelchair tennis	Women's singles	12 October
Gold	Shingo Kunieda	Wheelchair tennis	Men's singles	12 October
Gold	Kenya Karasawa	Athletics	Men's 5000 m T11	12 October
Gold	Dai Tokairin	Swimming	Men's 200 m individual medley SM14	12 October
Gold	Tomoki Sato	Athletics	Men's 800 m T51/52	12 October
Gold	Takuro Yamada	Swimming	Men's 50 m freestyle S9	12 October
Gold	Tadashi Horikoshi	Athletics	Men's 5000 m T12/T13	12 October
Gold	Sayaka Makita	Athletics	Women's 1500 m T20	12 October
Silver	Michinobu Fujita	Wheelchair fencing	Men's individual foil B	7 October
Silver	Mei Ichinose	Swimming	Women's 200 m individual medley SM9	7 October
Silver	Mami Inoue	Swimming	Women's 200 m freestyle S14	7 October
Silver	Sakura Koike	Swimming	Women's 50 m freestyle S7	7 October
Silver	Kazumi Nakayama	Athletics	Women's 800 m T52/53	7 October
Silver	Ayumi Ishii	Judo	Women's 52 kg	8 October
Silver	Akiko Morisawa	Bowling	Women's singles TPB3	8 October
Silver	Airi Ike	Swimming	Women's 100 m freestyle S10	8 October
Silver	Keiichi Kimura	Swimming	Men's 100 m freestyle S11	8 October
Silver	Daiki Kubo	Swimming	Men's 100 m freestyle S9	8 October
Silver	Sakura Koike	Swimming	Women's 100 m breaststroke SB6	8 October
Silver	Dai Tokairin	Swimming	Men's 100 m breaststroke SB14	8 October
Silver	Mai Deguchi	Swimming	Women's 100 m breaststroke SB14	8 October
Silver	Tomotaro Nakamura	Swimming	Men's 100 m breaststroke SB6	8 October
Silver	Chiaki Takada	Athletics	Women's long jump	8 October
Silver	Mayumi Narita	Swimming	Women's 100 m freestyle S5	8 October
Silver	Hiromi Nakada	Athletics	Women's shot put F20	8 October
Silver	Mei Ichinose; Airi Ike; Yuki Morishita; Erika Nara	Swimming	Women's 4 × 100 m freestyle relay 34 points	8 October
Silver	Koyo Iwabuchi	Table tennis	Men's singles TT9	9 October
Silver	Ryuji Onda	Wheelchair fencing	Men's individual sabre B	9 October
Silver	Kazuaki Kobayashi; Kazumori Higa	Bowling	Open doubles TPB2 + TPB2	9 October
Silver	Uchu Tomita	Swimming	Men's 200 m individual medley SM11	9 October
Silver	Keichi Nakajima	Swimming	Men's 100 m backstroke S14	9 October
Silver	Tomoya Ito	Athletics	Men's 100 m T51/52	9 October
Silver	Mayumi Narita	Swimming	Women's 200 m freestyle S1-5	9 October
Silver	Airi Ike	Swimming	Women's 200 m individual medley SM10	9 October
Silver	Kanta Kokubo	Athletics	Men's long jump T20	9 October
Silver	Kazumi Nakayama	Athletics	Women's 1500 m T53/54	9 October
Silver	Kaede Maegawa	Athletics	Women's long jump T42/63	9 October
Silver	Airi Ike	Swimming	Women's 100 m breaststroke SB9	10 October
Silver	Yuka Kiyama	Athletics	Women's 100 m T52	10 October
Silver	Mei Ichinose	Swimming	Women's 100 m freestyle S9	10 October
Silver	Keiko Konishi	Athletics	Women's 100 m T53	10 October
Silver	Kota Kubota	Swimming	Men's 100 m backstroke S9	10 October
Silver	Keita Sato	Athletics	Men's 100 m T44/62/64	10 October
Silver	Sakura Koike	Swimming	Women's 100 m freestyle S7	10 October
Silver	Aimi Toyama	Athletics	Women's 400 m T20	10 October
Silver	Keichi Nakajima	Swimming	Men's 100 m butterfly S14	10 October
Silver	Kayo Nakamura	Athletics	Women's 100 m T54	10 October
Silver	Masatoshi Kiyosugi; Kazuaki Kobayashi; Kanju Mori	Bowling	Team TPB1 + TPB2 + TPB3	11 October
Silver	Shota Kawamoto	Cycling	Men's road time trial C1-2	11 October
Silver	Aya Shinohara	Archery	Women's individual W1	11 October
Silver	Keiko Noguchi	Cycling	Women's 500 m C1-3	11 October
Silver	Chika Shigesada; Tomohiro Ueyama; Takahiro Hasegawa	Archery	Mixed team recurve W2	11 October
Silver	Yui Kamiji; Manami Tanaka	Wheelchair tennis	Women's doubles	11 October
Silver	Mei Ichinose	Swimming	Women's 50 m freestyle S9	11 October
Silver	Daiki Akai	Athletics	Men's 1500 m T20	11 October
Silver	Mayumi Narita	Swimming	Women's 50 m freestyle S5	11 October
Silver	Tomoya Ito	Athletics	Men's 400 m T52	11 October
Silver	Daiki Kubo; Kota Kubota; Kotaro Ogiwara; Takuro Yamada	Swimming	Men's 4 × 100 m medley relay 34 points	11 October
Silver	Toru Suzuki	Athletics	Men's high jump T44/64	11 October
Silver	Kazumi Nakayama	Athletics	Women's 400 m T52/53	11 October
Silver	Shunya Yamaji	Athletics	Men's 100 m T12	11 October
Silver	Shinya Wada	Athletics	Men's 1500 m T11	11 October
Silver	Koji Sugeno	Wheelchair tennis	Quad singles	12 October
Silver	Ayako Suzuki	Badminton	Women's singles SU5	12 October
Silver	Takashi Sanada	Wheelchair tennis	Men's singles	12 October
Silver	Mei Ichinose	Swimming	Women's 100 m butterfly S9	12 October
Silver	Uchu Tomita	Swimming	Men's 50 m freestyle S11	12 October
Silver	Hirokazu Ueyonabaru	Athletics	Men's 800 m T51/52	12 October
Silver	Mai Mizukami	Swimming	Women's 100 m freestyle S8	12 October
Silver	Mei Ichinose; Airi Ike; Sakura Koike; Mikuni Utsugi	Swimming	Women's 4 × 100 m medley relay 34 points	12 October
Silver	Keiko Konishi	Athletics	Women's 200 m T53	12 October
Silver	Kayo Nakamura	Athletics	Women's 200 m T54	12 October
Silver	Uran Sawada; Keita Sato; Yuka Takamatsu; Tomoki Suzuki	Athletics	4 × 100 m universal relay	12 October
Silver	Moeko Yamamoto	Athletics	Women's 1500 m T20	12 October
Silver	Shinya Wada	Athletics	Men's 5000 m T11	12 October
Silver	Mari Amimoto; Ikumi Fujii; Mayo Hagino; Chihiro Kitada; Yui Kitama; Rie Odajima; Chinami Shimizu; Momoko Suzuki; Mayumi Tsuchida; Amane Yanagimoto; Emi Yasuo; Izumi Zaima	Wheelchair basketball	Women's tournament	12 October
Silver	Mitsuhiro Matsuo; Nobuhiro Minami	Table tennis	Men's team TT1-2	13 October
Silver	Ryuga Akaishi; Kei Akita; Renshi Chokai; Reo Fujimoto; Takuya Furusawa; Takayoshi Iwai; Rin Kawahara; Hiroaki Kozai; Tetsuya Miyajima; Naohiro Murakami; Akira Toyoshima; Daisuke Tsuchiko	Wheelchair basketball	Men's tournament	13 October
Bronze	Anri Sakurai	Wheelchair fencing	Women's individual foil B	7 October
Bronze	Daiki Kubo	Swimming	Men's 200 m individual medley SM9	7 October
Bronze	Genki Saito	Swimming	Men's 400 m freestyle S11-13	7 October
Bronze	Ayano Tsujiuchi	Swimming	Women's 400 m freestyle S11-13	7 October
Bronze	Keichi Nakajima	Swimming	Men's 200 m freestyle S14	7 October
Bronze	Takaaki Hirai	Judo	Men's 60 kg	8 October
Bronze	Kanju Mori	Bowling	Mixed category singles TPB1	8 October
Bronze	Junko Hirose	Judo	Women's 67 kg	8 October
Bronze	Chikako Ono	Swimming	Women's 100 m freestyle S11	8 October
Bronze	Hajimu Ashida	Athletics	Men's long jump T45/46/47	8 October
Bronze	Mikika Serizawa	Swimming	Women's 100 m breaststroke SB14	8 October
Bronze	Atsuro Kobata	Athletics	Men's 800 m T33/34	8 October
Bronze	Ayano Tsujiuchi	Swimming	Women's 100 m freestyle S12-13	8 October
Bronze	Sonomi Sakai	Athletics	Women's long jump T20	8 October
Bronze	Taiga Hayashida	Swimming	Men's 100 m breaststroke SB14	8 October
Bronze	Sae Shigemoto	Athletics	Women's 400 m T45/46/47	8 October
Bronze	Masachika Inoue	Table tennis	Men's singles TT7	9 October
Bronze	Katsuyoshi Yagi	Table tennis	Men's singles TT7	9 October
Bronze	Takamasa Nagai	Judo	Men's 73 kg	9 October
Bronze	Hiroko Kudo	Judo	Women's 63 kg	9 October
Bronze	Chisato Abe	Wheelchair fencing	Women's individual sabre B	9 October
Bronze	Anri Sakurai	Wheelchair fencing	Women's individual sabre B	9 October
Bronze	Yuri Tomono	Table tennis	Women's singles TT8	9 October
Bronze	Aramitsu Kitazono	Judo	Men's 81 kg	9 October
Bronze	Atsumi Nishimura	Judo	Women's 70 kg	9 October
Bronze	Nozomi Takeuchi	Table tennis	Women's singles TT10	9 October
Bronze	Mikuni Utsugi	Swimming	Women's 200 m individual medley SM9	9 October
Bronze	Yudai Kikawada	Table tennis	Men's singles TT11	9 October
Bronze	Toshiya Takahashi	Table tennis	Men's singles TT11	9 October
Bronze	Chikako Ono	Swimming	Women's 200 m individual medley SM11	9 October
Bronze	Genki Saito	Swimming	Men's 100 m backstroke S12-13	9 October
Bronze	Takuya Tsugawa	Swimming	Men's 100 m backstroke S14	9 October
Bronze	Atsuro Kobata	Athletics	Men's 100 m T34	9 October
Bronze	Tomomi Tozawa	Athletics	Women's long jump T42/63	9 October
Bronze	Tadashi Horikoshi	Athletics	Men's 1500 m T12/13	9 October
Bronze	Mitsuo Yamaguchi	Athletics	Men's long jump T20	9 October
Bronze	Michinobu Fujita	Wheelchair fencing	Men's individual épée B	10 October
Bronze	Yoshikazu Matsumoto	Judo	Men's 100 kg	10 October
Bronze	Anri Sakurai	Wheelchair fencing	Women's individual épée B	10 October
Bronze	Mei Ichinose	Swimming	Women's 100 m breaststroke SB9	10 October
Bronze	Mami Inoue	Swimming	Women's 100 m butterfly S14	10 October
Bronze	Daiki Kubo	Swimming	Men's 100 m breaststroke SB9	10 October
Bronze	Ayano Tsujiuchi	Swimming	Women's 200 m individual medley SM12-13	10 October
Bronze	Sae Shigemoto	Athletics	Women's 100 m T45/46/47	10 October
Bronze	Shota Kawamoto	Cycling	Men's kilo C1–3	11 October
Bronze	Ayumi Ishii; Junko Hirose; Atsumi Nishimura	Judo	Women's team	11 October
Bronze	Miho Fujii	Cycling	Women's pursuit C1-3	11 October
Bronze	Kotaro Ogiwara	Swimming	Men's 100 m butterfly S8	11 October
Bronze	Airi Ike	Swimming	Women's 400 m freestyle S9-10	11 October
Bronze	Michinobu Fujita; Shintaro Kano; Takaaki Sasajima; Naoki Yasu	Wheelchair fencing	Men's team foil A-B	11 October
Bronze	Hideki Odo	Powerlifting	Men's 88 kg	11 October
Bronze	Mei Ichinose	Swimming	Women's 100 m backstroke S9	11 October
Bronze	Kotaro Ogiwara	Swimming	Men's 100 m freestyle S8	11 October
Bronze	Kota Kubota	Swimming	Men's 50 m freestyle S8	11 October
Bronze	Michinobu Fujita; Shintaro Kano; Takaaki Sasajima; Naoki Yasu	Wheelchair fencing	Men's team sabre A-B	11 October
Bronze	Kenya Karasawa	Athletics	Men's 1500 m T11	11 October
Bronze	Sakura Koike	Swimming	Women's 400 m freestyle S6-7	11 October
Bronze	Yuji Togawa	Athletics	Men's 1500 m T20	11 October
Bronze	Genki Saito	Swimming	Men's 200 m individual medley SM12-13	11 October
Bronze	Kayo Nakamura	Athletics	Women's 400 m T54	11 October
Bronze	Sachie Akakura; Junko Fuji; Mika Hata; Emi Kaneki; Satoko Kikuchi; Michiyo Nishiie; Shiori Ogata; Mamiko Osada; Yoko Saito; Mikiko Sumitomo; Yukari Tanaka	Sitting volleyball	Women's tournament	11 October
Bronze	Shota Kawamoto	Cycling	Men's pursuit C1–2	12 October
Bronze	Miho Fujii	Cycling	Women's 500 m C1-3	12 October
Bronze	Hidetaka Sugimura; Takayuki Hirose; Takumi Nakamura; Yuriko Fujii	Boccia	Mixed team BC1/BC2	12 October
Bronze	Yuma Yamazaki	Badminton	Women's singles WH2	12 October
Bronze	Mitsuteru Moroishi	Wheelchair tennis	Quad singles	12 October
Bronze	Osamu Nagashima	Badminton	Men's singles WH1	12 October
Bronze	Momoko Ohtani	Wheelchair tennis	Women's singles	12 October
Bronze	Sarina Satomi	Badminton	Women's singles WH1	12 October
Bronze	Kohei Suzuki	Wheelchair tennis	Men's singles	12 October
Bronze	Mami Inoue	Swimming	Women's 200 m individual medley SM14	12 October
Bronze	Rie Ogura; Ikumi Fuke	Badminton	Women's doubles WH1-WH2	12 October
Bronze	Daiki Kubo	Swimming	Men's 50 m freestyle S9	12 October
Bronze	Ayano Tsujiuchi	Swimming	Women's 50 m freestyle S13	12 October
Bronze	Osamu Nagashima; Yuma Yamazaki	Badminton	Mixed doubles WH1-WH2	12 October
Bronze	Keichi Nakajima	Swimming	Men's 200 m individual medley SM14	12 October
Bronze	Ryo Nagano	Swimming	Men's 50 m freestyle S13	12 October
Bronze	Yuki Morishita	Swimming	Women's 100 m butterfly S8–9	12 October
Bronze	Misaki Ari	Athletics	Women's 1500 m T20	12 October
Bronze	Masahiro Taniguchi	Athletics	Men's 5000 m T11	12 October
Bronze	Masachika Inoue; Katsuyoshi Yagi	Table tennis	Men's team TT6-7	13 October
Bronze	Takumi Shukunobe; Arufua Tateishi	Table tennis	Men's team TT8	13 October
Bronze	Toshiaki Suenaga; Akiko Sugino	Badminton	Mixed doubles SL3-SU5	13 October

== Medal summary ==
=== Medals by sport ===
Medals by sport
Sport	1st place, gold medalist(s)	2nd place, silver medalist(s)	3rd place, bronze medalist(s)	Total
Swimming	23	28	29	80
Athletics	13	24	14	51
Wheelchair tennis	4	3	3	10
Cycling	3	2	4	9
Table tennis	1	2	8	11
Goalball	1	0	0	1
Bowling	0	3	1	4
Wheelchair fencing	0	2	7	9
Archery	0	2	0	2
Wheelchair basketball	0	2	0	2
Judo	0	1	8	9
Badminton	0	1	6	7
Boccia	0	0	1	1
Powerlifting	0	0	1	1
Sitting volleyball	0	0	1	1
Total	45	70	83	198

=== Medals by day ===
Medals by day
Day	Date	1st place, gold medalist(s)	2nd place, silver medalist(s)	3rd place, bronze medalist(s)	Total
1	October 7	5	5	5	15
2	October 8	5	13	11	29
3	October 9	6	11	20	37
4	October 10	7	10	8	25
5	October 11	10	15	17	42
6	October 12	12	14	19	45
7	October 13	0	2	3	5
Total		45	70	83	150

== See also ==
- Japan at the 2018 Asian Games
