= Shooting at the 2018 Asian Para Games =

Paralympic shooting at the 2018 Asian Para Games
- Venue: Gelora Bung Karno Shooting Range
- Location: Jakarta, Indonesia
- Dates: 8–12 October

Paralympic shooting at the 2018 Asian Para Games was held in Jakarta between 8 and 12 October 2018.

== Medal table ==
* Host nation (Indonesia)

Rank	NPC	Gold	Silver	Bronze	Total
1	China (CHN)	3	5	5	13
2	South Korea (KOR)	3	3	5	11
3	Iran (IRI)	3	1	0	4
4	Thailand (THA)	2	2	1	5
5	India (IND)	1	1	1	3
6	United Arab Emirates (UAE)	1	1	0	2
7	Iraq (IRQ)	0	0	1	1
Totals (7 entries)		13	13	13	39

== Medalists ==
=== Men ===
Event	Class	Gold	Silver	Bronze
10 m air pistol	SH1	Manish Narwal; India	Huang Xing; China	Yang Chao; China
10 m air rifle	SH1	Wiraphon Mansing; Thailand	Abdullah Sultan Alaryani; United Arab Emirates	Dong Chao; China
50 m rifle 3 positions	SH1	Abdullah Sultan Alaryani; United Arab Emirates	Park Jin-ho; South Korea	Sim Jae-yong; South Korea

=== Women ===
Event	Class	Gold	Silver	Bronze
10 m air pistol	SH1	Sareh Javanmardi; Iran	Samira Eram; Iran	Sarah al-Shabbani; Iraq
10 m air rifle	SH1	Roghayeh Shojaei; Iran	Yan Yaping; China	Zhang Cuiping; China
50 m rifle 3 positions	SH1	Zhang Cuiping; China	Yan Yaping; China	Bai Xiaohong; China

=== Mixed ===
Event	Class	Gold	Silver	Bronze
10 m air rifle prone	SH1	Dong Chao; China	Lee Jang-ho; South Korea	Atidet Intanon; Thailand
25 m sport pistol	SH1	Huang Xing; China	Yang Chao; China	Park Chul; South Korea
50 m rifle prone	SH1	Sim Jae-yong; South Korea	Zhang Cuiping; China	Yan Yaping; China
50 m free pistol	SH1	Sareh Javanmardi; Iran	Manish Narwal; India	Singhraj Adhana; India
10 m air rifle standing	SH2	Lee Ji-seok; South Korea	Anuson Chaichamnan; Thailand	Jeon Young-jun; South Korea
10 m air rifle prone	SH2	Anuson Chaichamnan; Thailand	Lee Ji-seok; South Korea	Jeon Young-jun; South Korea
50 m rifle prone	SH2	Lee Ji-seok; South Korea	Anuson Chaichamnan; Thailand	Jeon Young-jun; South Korea

== Medals (2010-2018) ==
Source (NPC Profile):

Rank	Nation	Gold	Silver	Bronze	Total
1	South Korea (KOR)	16	10	19	45
2	China (CHN)	12	16	10	38
3	Iran (IRI)	6	4	3	13
4	Thailand (THA)	3	5	3	11
5	United Arab Emirates (UAE)	2	4	1	7
6	India (IND)	1	1	1	3
7	Iraq (IRQ)	0	0	1	1
7	Japan (JPN)	0	0	1	1
7	Mongolia (MGL)	0	0	1	1
Totals (9 entries)		40	40	40	120

== 2010-2018 ==
=== Medallists from previous Asian Para Games - Men - Individual ===
As of 24 SEP 2023

P1 - 10m Air Pistol SH1

Year Location Gold Silver Bronze

2018 Jakarta (INA) NARWAL Manish (IND) HUANG Xing (CHN) YANG Chao (CHN)

2014 Incheon (KOR) SORNSRIWICHAI Bordin (THA) ZAMANISHURABI Mahdi (IRI) SEO Youngkyun (KOR)

2010 Guangzhou (CHN) RU Decheng (CHN) SONGSIWEICHAI Boddin (THA) LEE Juhee (KOR)

R1 - 10m Air Rifle Standing SH1

Year Location Gold Silver Bronze

2018 Jakarta (INA) MANSING Wiraphon (THA) ALARYANI Abdulla Sultan (UAE) DONG Chao (CHN)

2014 Incheon (KOR) DONG Chao (CHN) ALARYANI Abdulla Sultan (UAE) JEON Jinhwa (KOR)

2010 Guangzhou (CHN) SALEHNEJADAMREI Seyedramzan (IRI) PARK Jinho (KOR) LEE Seungchul (KOR)

R7 - 50m Rifle 3 Positions SH1

Year Location Gold Silver Bronze

2018 Jakarta (INA) ALARYANI Abdulla Sultan (UAE) PARK Jinho (KOR) SIM Jae Yong (KOR)

2014 Incheon (KOR) PARK Jinho (KOR) ALARYANI Abdulla Sultan (UAE) JEON Jinhwa (KOR)

2010 Guangzhou (CHN) PARK Young Joon (KOR) GOU Dingchao (CHN) DONG Chao (CHN)

=== Medallists from previous Asian Para Games - Women - Individual ===
As of 24 SEP 2023

P2 - 10m Air Pistol SH1

Year Location Gold Silver Bronze

2018 Jakarta (INA) JAVANMARDI Sareh (IRI) ERAM Samira (IRI) AL-SHABBANI Sarah (IRQ)

2014 Incheon (KOR) JAVANMARDI Sareh (IRI) MUANGSIRI Somporn (THA) MAHMOUDIKORDKHEILI Alieh (IRI)

2010 Guangzhou (CHN) LIN Haiyan (CHN) JAWANMARDI-DUDMA Shalih (IRI) MAHMOUDI-KURDHI Aliye (IRI)

R2 - 10m Air Rifle Standing SH1

Year Location Gold Silver Bronze

2018 Jakarta (INA) SHOJAEI Roghayeh (IRI) YAN Yaping (CHN) ZHANG Cuiping (CHN)

2014 Incheon (KOR) YAN Yaping (CHN) KANG Myungsoon (KOR) ZHANG Cuiping (CHN)

2010 Guangzhou (CHN) HE Huan (CHN) ZHANG Cuiping (CHN) REZAEI Seyedh Azam (IRI)

R8 - 50m Rifle 3 Positions SH1

Year Location Gold Silver Bronze

2018 Jakarta (INA) ZHANG Cuiping (CHN) YAN Yaping (CHN) BAI Xiaohong (CHN)

2014 Incheon (KOR) ZHANG Cuiping (CHN) YAN Yaping (CHN) KANG Myungsoon (KOR)

2010 Guangzhou (CHN) LI Yanli (KOR) ZHANG Cuiping (CHN) HE Huan (CHN)

=== Medallists from previous Asian Para Games - Mixed ===
As of 24 SEP 2023

P3 - 25m Pistol SH1

Year Location Gold Silver Bronze

2018 Jakarta (INA) HUANG Xing (CHN) YANG Chao (CHN) PARK Chul (KOR)

2014 Incheon (KOR) LEE Juhee (KOR) NI Hedong (CHN) PARK Seakyun (KOR)

2010 Guangzhou (CHN) NI Hedong (CHN) LI Jianfei (CHN) LEE Juhee (KOR)

P4 - 50m Pistol SH1

Year Location Gold Silver Bronze

2018 Jakarta (INA) JAVANMARDI Sareh (IRI) NARWAL Manish (IND) SINGHRAJ (IND)

2014 Incheon (KOR) JAVANMARDI Sareh (IRI) NI Hedong (CHN) ZANDRAA Ganbaatar (MGL)

2010 Guangzhou (CHN) LEE Juhee (KOR) PARK Si-Jun (KOR) XU Yongjun (KOR)

R3 - 10m Air Rifle Prone SH1

Year Location Gold Silver Bronze

2018 Jakarta (INA) DONG Chao (CHN) LEE Jangho (KOR) INTANON Atidet (THA)

2014 Incheon (KOR) LEE Yunri (KOR) PARK Jinho (KOR) ZHANG Cuiping (CHN)

2010 Guangzhou (CHN) ZHANG Cuiping (CHN) SIM Jae Yong (KOR) PARK Jinho (KOR)

R4 - 10m Air Rifle Standing SH2

Year Location Gold Silver Bronze

2018 Jakarta (INA) LEE Jiseok (KOR) CHAICHAMNAN Anuson (THA) JEON Youngjun (KOR)

2014 Incheon (KOR) KIM Geunsoo (KOR) KHODABAKHSHI Masoumeh (IRI) KANG Juyoung (KOR)

2010 Guangzhou (CHN) LEE Jiseok (KOR) YUAN Hongxiang (CHN) LIU Jie (CHN)

R5 - 10m Air Rifle Prone SH2

Year Location Gold Silver Bronze

2018 Jakarta (INA) CHAICHAMNAN Anuson (THA) LEE Jiseok (KOR) JEON Youngjun (KOR)

2014 Incheon (KOR) JEON Youngjun (KOR) CHANNAM Tanong (THA) KIM Geunsoo (KOR)

2010 Guangzhou (CHN) LEE Jiseok (KOR) LONG Ruihong (CHN) RYU Ho-Kyung (KOR)

R6 - 50m Free Rifle Prone SH1

Year Location Gold Silver Bronze

2018 Jakarta (INA) SIM Jae Yong (KOR) ZHANG Cuiping (CHN) YAN Yaping (CHN)

2014 Incheon (KOR) PARK Jinho (KOR) ALARYANI Abdulla Sultan (UAE) ALARYANI Abdulla Saif (UAE)

2010 Guangzhou (CHN) DONG Chao (CHN) PARK Young Joon (KOR) TAGUCHI Aki (JPN)

R9 - 50m Rifle Prone SH2

Year Location Gold Silver Bronze

2018 Jakarta (INA) LEE Jiseok (KOR) CHAICHAMNAN Anuson (THA) JEON Youngjun (KOR)

2014 Incheon (KOR) JEON Youngjun (KOR) YUAN Hongxiang (CHN) KIM Geunsoo (KOR)

=== Medallists from previous Asian Para Games - Team - Open- Discontinued ===
As of 24 SEP 2023

R3 - 10m Air Rifle Prone SH1 - Team

Year Location Gold Silver Bronze

2014 Incheon (KOR) Republic of Korea (KOR) People's Republic of China (CHN) Thailand (THA)

PARK Jinho ZHANG Cuiping SIRISAK Woraprat

SIM Jae Yong DONG Chao SAENLAR Chutima

JEON Jinhwa TIAN Fugang INTANON Atidet

R6 - 50m Free Rifle Prone SH1 - Team

Year Location Gold Silver Bronze

2014 Incheon (KOR) United Arab Emirates (UAE) Republic of Korea (KOR) Thailand (THA)

ALARYANI Abdulla Saif LEE Yunri INTANON Atidet

ALARYANI Abdulla Sultan PARK Jinho SIHABANDIT Mala

ALDAHMANI Obaid KIM Haksun KEATJARATKUL Wasana

Medals by NPC - Asian Para Games

As of 24 SEP 2023

Asian Para Games 2010 - 2018 Rank NPC Men Women Open Total Rank by total

G S B Tot G S B Tot G S B Tot G S B Tot

1 KOR - Republic of Korea 2 2 6 10 1 1 1 3 13 7 12 32 16 10 19 45 1

2 CHN - People's Republic of China 2 2 3 7 5 5 4 14 5 9 3 17 12 16 10 38 2

3 IRI - Islamic Republic of Iran 1 1 2 3 2 3 8 2 1 3 6 4 3 13 3

4 THA - Thailand 2 1 3 1 1 1 3 3 7 3 5 3 11 4

5 UAE - United Arab Emirates 1 3 4 1 1 1 3 2 4 1 7 5

6 IND - India 1 1 1 1 2 1 1 1 3 6

7 IRQ - Iraq 1 1 1 1 =7

7 JPN - Japan 1 1 1 1 =7

7 MGL - Mongolia 1 1 1 1 =7

Total 9 9 9 27 9 9 9 27 22 22 22 66 40 40 40 120

Legend:

-: Equal sign (=) indicates that two or more NPCs share the same rank by total.

G - Gold; S - Silver; B - Bronze; Tot - Total

== See also ==
- Shooting at the 2018 Asian Games
