= Sitting volleyball at the 2018 Asian Para Games =

- Venue: Gelora Bung Karno Tennis Indoor Stadium
- Location: Jakarta, Indonesia
- Dates: 7–11 October

Sitting volleyball at the 2018 Asian Para Games in Jakarta took place between 7 and 11 October 2018.

== Medalists ==
Event	Gold	Silver	Bronze
Men	Iran; Meisam Alipour; Davoud Alipourian; Mahdi Babadi; Sadegh Bigdeli; Hossein Farzaneh; Hossein Golestani; Majid Lashkarisanami; Morteza Mehrzad; Mohammad Nemati; Ramezan Salehi; Mohammadreza Sobhaninia; Isa Zirahi	China; Ding Jian; Ding Xiaochao; Jia Youming; Jiang Dongdong; Qian Xiangrong; Wang Qiang; Xu Zengbing; Zhang Zhongmin; Zhou Canming	Kazakhstan; Yerlan Bitemirov; Alexandr Demeuov; Berik Izmaganbetov; Turlan Karatayev; Erik Kaskabayev; Almat Manabayev; Shyngys Medeuov; Nurtau Mukanbetkaliyev; Perdebay Namuratov; Bauyrzhan Sartayev; Akylbek Shikibayev; Zhangali Suieuov; Bauyrzhan Takhauov
Women	China; Gao Wenwen; Gong Bin; Lü Hongqin; Qiu Junfei; Tang Xuemei; Wang Li; Wang Yanan; Zhang Lijun; Zhang Xufei; Zhao Meiling	Iran; Zahra Danayetous; Mehri Fallahi; Nasrin Farhadi; Farzaneh Heidari; Batoul Jafarian; Fatemeh Jahani; Batoul Khalilzadeh; Zeynab Maleki; Zahra Nejatiaref; Neda Panjehbashi; Masoumeh Shajarati; Masoumeh Zarei	Japan; Sachie Akakura; Junko Fuji; Mika Hata; Emi Kaneki; Satoko Kikuchi; Michiyo Nishiie; Shiori Ogata; Mamiko Osada; Yoko Saito; Mikiko Sumitomo; Yukari Tanaka

== Results ==
Detail Results :

=== Men ===
==== Group A ====
Pos	Team	Pld	W	L	Pts	SW	SL	SR	SPW	SPL	SPR	Qualification
1	Kazakhstan	3	3	0	6	9	2	4.500	257	198	1.298	Semi-finals
2	Iraq	3	2	1	5	8	4	2.000	267	212	1.259	Semi-finals
3	Myanmar	3	1	2	4	4	6	0.667	198	229	0.865	Classification 5th / 6th
4	Indonesia (H)	3	0	3	3	0	9	0.000	142	225	0.631	Classification 7th / 8th

Source: Games System
(H) Host

7 October 2018; 12:00 UTC+7	Indonesia	0–3	Myanmar	Gelora Bung Karno Tennis Indoor Stadium
7 October 2018; 12:00 UTC+7	(22–25, 21–25, 22–25); Report			Gelora Bung Karno Tennis Indoor Stadium

7 October 2018; 15:30 UTC+7	Kazakhstan	3–2	Iraq	Gelora Bung Karno Tennis Indoor Stadium
7 October 2018; 15:30 UTC+7	(22–25, 25–23, 20–25, 25–22, 15–8); Report			Gelora Bung Karno Tennis Indoor Stadium

8 October 2018; 14:00 UTC+7	Iraq	3–0	Indonesia	Gelora Bung Karno Tennis Indoor Stadium
8 October 2018; 14:00 UTC+7	(25–11, 25–10, 25–10); Report			Gelora Bung Karno Tennis Indoor Stadium

8 October 2018; 15:30 UTC+7	Kazakhstan	3–0	Myanmar	Gelora Bung Karno Tennis Indoor Stadium
8 October 2018; 15:30 UTC+7	(25–16, 25–14, 25–19); Report			Gelora Bung Karno Tennis Indoor Stadium

9 October 2018; 9:00 UTC+7	Iraq	3–1	Myanmar	Gelora Bung Karno Tennis Indoor Stadium
9 October 2018; 9:00 UTC+7	(14–25, 25–14, 25–17, 25–18); Report			Gelora Bung Karno Tennis Indoor Stadium

9 October 2018; 17:00 UTC+7	Indonesia	0–3	Kazakhstan	Gelora Bung Karno Tennis Indoor Stadium
9 October 2018; 17:00 UTC+7	(14–25, 14–25, 18–25); Report			Gelora Bung Karno Tennis Indoor Stadium

==== Group B ====
Pos	Team	Pld	W	L	Pts	SW	SL	SR	SPW	SPL	SPR	Qualification
1	Iran	3	3	0	6	9	0	MAX	225	130	1.731	Semi-finals
2	China	3	2	1	5	6	3	2.000	195	156	1.250	Semi-finals
3	Japan	3	1	2	4	3	8	0.375	203	253	0.802	Classification 5th / 6th
4	South Korea	3	0	3	3	2	9	0.222	176	260	0.677	Classification 7th / 8th

Source: Games System

7 October 2018; 14:00 UTC+7	Iran	3–0	South Korea	Gelora Bung Karno Tennis Indoor Stadium
7 October 2018; 14:00 UTC+7	(25–9, 25–12, 25–14); Report			Gelora Bung Karno Tennis Indoor Stadium

7 October 2018; 17:00 UTC+7	China	3–0	Japan	Gelora Bung Karno Tennis Indoor Stadium
7 October 2018; 17:00 UTC+7	(25–11, 25–16, 25–16); Report			Gelora Bung Karno Tennis Indoor Stadium

8 October 2018; 12:00 UTC+7	Japan	0–3	Iran	Gelora Bung Karno Tennis Indoor Stadium
8 October 2018; 12:00 UTC+7	(13–25, 19–25, 18–25); Report			Gelora Bung Karno Tennis Indoor Stadium

8 October 2018; 17:00 UTC+7	China	3–0	South Korea	Gelora Bung Karno Tennis Indoor Stadium
8 October 2018; 17:00 UTC+7	(25–13, 25–9, 25–16); Report			Gelora Bung Karno Tennis Indoor Stadium

9 October 2018; 14:00 UTC+7	Iran	3–0	China	Gelora Bung Karno Tennis Indoor Stadium
9 October 2018; 14:00 UTC+7	(25–18, 25–12, 25–15); Report			Gelora Bung Karno Tennis Indoor Stadium

9 October 2018; 15:30 UTC+7	Japan	3–2	South Korea	Gelora Bung Karno Tennis Indoor Stadium
9 October 2018; 15:30 UTC+7	(22–25, 25–19, 25–22, 23–25, 15–12); Report			Gelora Bung Karno Tennis Indoor Stadium

==== Finals ====
Semi-finals
10 October
Kazakhstan	1
China	3
10 October
Iran	3
Iraq	0

Gold medal
11 October
China	1
Iran	3
Bronze medal
11 October
Kazakhstan	3
Iraq	0

Classification 7th/8th

10 October 2018; 14:00 UTC+7	Indonesia	0–3	South Korea	Gelora Bung Karno Tennis Indoor Stadium
10 October 2018; 14:00 UTC+7	(13–25, 16–25, 12–25); Report			Gelora Bung Karno Tennis Indoor Stadium

Classification 5th/6th

10 October 2018; 15:30 UTC+7	Myanmar	3–1	Japan	Gelora Bung Karno Tennis Indoor Stadium
10 October 2018; 15:30 UTC+7	(18–25, 25–23, 25–21, 25–18); Report			Gelora Bung Karno Tennis Indoor Stadium

Semi-finals

10 October 2018; 10:30 UTC+7	Kazakhstan	1–3	China	Gelora Bung Karno Tennis Indoor Stadium
10 October 2018; 10:30 UTC+7	(23–25, 21–25, 25–15, 21–25); Report			Gelora Bung Karno Tennis Indoor Stadium

10 October 2018; 12:00 UTC+7	Iran	3–0	Iraq	Gelora Bung Karno Tennis Indoor Stadium
10 October 2018; 12:00 UTC+7	(25–8, 25–12, 25–19); Report			Gelora Bung Karno Tennis Indoor Stadium

Bronze medal game

11 October 2018; 9:00 UTC+7	Kazakhstan	3–0	Iraq	Gelora Bung Karno Tennis Indoor Stadium
11 October 2018; 9:00 UTC+7	(25–22, 25–22, 25–19); Report			Gelora Bung Karno Tennis Indoor Stadium

Gold medal game

11 October 2018; 15:00 UTC+7	Iran	3–0	China	Gelora Bung Karno Tennis Indoor Stadium
11 October 2018; 15:00 UTC+7	(25–16, 25–14, 25–15); Report			Gelora Bung Karno Tennis Indoor Stadium

=== Women ===
==== Round Robin ====
Pos	Team	Pld	W	L	Pts	SW	SL	SR	SPW	SPL	SPR	Qualification
1	China	4	4	0	8	12	0	MAX	300	112	2.679	Semi-finals
2	Iran	4	3	1	7	9	4	2.250	295	263	1.122	Semi-finals
3	Japan	4	2	2	6	7	7	1.000	288	286	1.007	Semi-finals
4	Indonesia (H)	4	1	3	5	4	9	0.444	235	302	0.778	Semi-finals
5	Mongolia	4	0	4	4	0	12	0.000	145	300	0.483	

Source: Games System
(H) Host

7 October 2018; 9:00 UTC+7	Mongolia	0–3	Indonesia	Gelora Bung Karno Tennis Indoor Stadium
7 October 2018; 9:00 UTC+7	(22–25, 19–25, 13–25); Report			Gelora Bung Karno Tennis Indoor Stadium

7 October 2018; 10:30 UTC+7	Iran	3–1	Japan	Gelora Bung Karno Tennis Indoor Stadium
7 October 2018; 10:30 UTC+7	(31–29, 19–25, 25–19, 25–21); Report			Gelora Bung Karno Tennis Indoor Stadium

7 October 2018; 19:00 UTC+7	China	3–0	Mongolia	Gelora Bung Karno Tennis Indoor Stadium
7 October 2018; 19:00 UTC+7	(25–2, 25–6, 25–7); Report			Gelora Bung Karno Tennis Indoor Stadium

8 October 2018; 9:00 UTC+7	Iran	3–0	Indonesia	Gelora Bung Karno Tennis Indoor Stadium
8 October 2018; 9:00 UTC+7	(29–27, 25–18, 25–13); Report			Gelora Bung Karno Tennis Indoor Stadium

8 October 2018; 10:30 UTC+7	Japan	3–0	Mongolia	Gelora Bung Karno Tennis Indoor Stadium
8 October 2018; 10:30 UTC+7	(25–15, 25–15, 25–10); Report			Gelora Bung Karno Tennis Indoor Stadium

8 October 2018; 19:00 UTC+7	Japan	0–3	China	Gelora Bung Karno Tennis Indoor Stadium
8 October 2018; 19:00 UTC+7	(7–25, 10–25, 8–25); Report			Gelora Bung Karno Tennis Indoor Stadium

9 October 2018; 10:30 UTC+7	China	3–0	Iran	Gelora Bung Karno Tennis Indoor Stadium
9 October 2018; 10:30 UTC+7	(25–15, 25–14, 25–12); Report			Gelora Bung Karno Tennis Indoor Stadium

9 October 2018; 12:00 UTC+7	Indonesia	1–3	Japan	Gelora Bung Karno Tennis Indoor Stadium
9 October 2018; 12:00 UTC+7	(18–25, 7–25, 25–19, 21–25); Report			Gelora Bung Karno Tennis Indoor Stadium

9 October 2018; 19:00 UTC+7	Mongolia	0–3	Iran	Gelora Bung Karno Tennis Indoor Stadium
9 October 2018; 19:00 UTC+7	(8–25, 14–25, 14–25); Report			Gelora Bung Karno Tennis Indoor Stadium

10 October 2018; 9:00 UTC+7	Indonesia	0–3	China	Gelora Bung Karno Tennis Indoor Stadium
10 October 2018; 9:00 UTC+7	(10–25, 9–25, 12–25); Report			Gelora Bung Karno Tennis Indoor Stadium

==== Final Round ====
Semi-finals
10 October
China	3
Indonesia	0
10 October
Iran	3
Japan	0

Gold medal
11 October
China	3
Iran	0
Bronze medal
11 October
Indonesia	1
Japan	3

Semi-finals

10 October 2018; 17:00 UTC+7	China	3–0	Indonesia	Gelora Bung Karno Tennis Indoor Stadium
10 October 2018; 17:00 UTC+7	(25–14, 25–14, 25–10); Report			Gelora Bung Karno Tennis Indoor Stadium

10 October 2018; 19:00 UTC+7	Iran	3–0	Japan	Gelora Bung Karno Tennis Indoor Stadium
10 October 2018; 19:00 UTC+7	(25–17, 25–14, 25–10); Report			Gelora Bung Karno Tennis Indoor Stadium

Bronze Medal Match

11 October 2018; 10:30 UTC+7	Indonesia	1–3	Japan	Gelora Bung Karno Tennis Indoor Stadium
11 October 2018; 10:30 UTC+7	(17–25, 25–19, 17–25, 11–25); Report			Gelora Bung Karno Tennis Indoor Stadium

Gold Medal Match

11 October 2018; 12:00 UTC+7	China	3–0	Iran	Gelora Bung Karno Tennis Indoor Stadium
11 October 2018; 12:00 UTC+7	(25–13, 25–17, 25–16); Report			Gelora Bung Karno Tennis Indoor Stadium

== See also ==
- Volleyball at the 2018 Asian Games
