= Wheelchair tennis at the 2018 Asian Para Games =

- Venue: Klub Kelapa Gading
- Location: Jakarta, Indonesia
- Dates: 7–12 October

Wheelchair tennis at the 2018 Asian Para Games was held in Jakarta between 7 and 12 October 2018.

== Medal table ==
* Host nation (Indonesia)

Rank	NPC	Gold	Silver	Bronze	Total
1	Japan (JPN)	4	3	3	10
2	South Korea (KOR)	1	2	0	3
3	China (CHN)	1	1	0	2
4	Chinese Taipei (TPE)	0	0	1	1
4	Sri Lanka (SRI)	0	0	1	1
4	Thailand (THA)	0	0	1	1
Totals (6 entries)		6	6	6	18

== Medalists ==
Event	Gold	Silver	Bronze
Men's singles	Shingo Kunieda; Japan	Takashi Sanada; Japan	Kohei Suzuki; Japan
Men's doubles	Shingo Kunieda and Takashi Sanada (JPN)	Im Ho-won and Lee Ha-gel (KOR)	Lasantha Ranaweera and Suresh Dharmasena (SRI)
Women's singles	Yui Kamiji; Japan	Zhu Zhenzhen; China	Momoko Ohtani; Japan
Women's doubles	Huang Huimin and Zhu Zhenzhen (CHN)	Yui Kamiji and Manami Tanaka (JPN)	Wanitha Inthanin and Sakhorn Khanthasit (THA)
Quad singles	Kim Kyu-seung; South Korea	Koji Sugeno; Japan	Mitsuteru Moroishi; Japan
Quad doubles	Mitsuteru Moroishi and Koji Sugeno (JPN)	Kim Kyu-seung and Kim Myung-je (KOR)	Huang Chu-yin and Huang Tzu-hsuan (TPE)

== See also ==
- Wheelchair tennis at the 2017 ASEAN Para Games
- Tennis at the 2018 Asian Games
