= Afghanistan at the 2010 Asian Para Games =

- IOC code: AFG
- NPC: Afghanistan Paralympic Committee

in Guangzhou 12–19 December 2010
- Competitors: 8 in 5 sports
- Medals: Gold 0 Silver 0 Bronze 0 Total 0

Asian Para Games appearances (overview)
- 2010; 2014; 2018; 2022; 2026

Afghanistan participated tn the 2010 Asian Para Games–First Asian Para Games in Guangzhou, China from 13 to 19 December 2010. Athletes from Afghanistan competed five events.

== Participation details ==
=== Athletics ===
| Athletes | Event | Heat | | Semifinal | | Final | |
| Athletes | Event | Result | Rank | Result | Rank | Result | Rank |
|---|---|---|---|---|---|---|---|
| Zubair Haidari | Men's 100 m - T46 | | | 14.01 | 8 | Did not advance | |
| Abdul Magsoud Khoshbin | Men's 100 m - T46 | | | 14.65 | 7 | Did not advance | |
| Nazir Ahmad Azizi | Men's Shot Put - F44/46 | | | | | 7.33 | 21 |

=== Cycling ===
| Athlete | Event | Qualifying | | Final | |
| Athlete | Event | Time | Rank | Time | Rank |
|---|---|---|---|---|---|
| Mohammad Shaida | Mixed (C1-3M&C1-5W) Road Race | | | 1:44:49 | 14 |
| Mohammad Shaida | Mixed C 1-5 Individual Time Trial | | | 35:54.09 | 21 |
| Mohammad Shaida | Mixed C1-3M&C1-5m 3 km Ind Pursuit | 4:40.204 | 13 | Did not advance | |

=== Powerlifting ===
| Athlete | Event | Result | Rank |
|---|---|---|---|
| Saber Mohammad Sultani | Men's -48 kg | 80.0 | 7 |

=== Swimming ===
| Athlete | Event | Time | Rank |
|---|---|---|---|
| Mohammad Malik Sabr | Men's 50m Freestyle - S8 | 1:02.76 | 14 |
| Hashmatullah Masjidi | Men's 50m Freestyle - S8 | 1:35.03 | 15 |

=== Table tennis ===
| Athlete (Group C) | Pts | Pld | W | L | GF | GA | PF | PA |
|---|---|---|---|---|---|---|---|---|
| Zhao Shuai (CHN) | 6 | 3 | 3 | 0 | 9 | 0 | 106 | 55 |
| Kim Kwang-jin (KOR) | 5 | 3 | 2 | 1 | 6 | 3 | 85 | 54 |
| Hou Ting-Sung (TPE) | 4 | 3 | 1 | 2 | 3 | 6 | 78 | 81 |
| Safar Mohammad Ahmadi (AFG) | 3 | 3 | 0 | 3 | 0 | 9 | 20 | 99 |
