= Goalball at the 2018 Asian Para Games =

- Venue: Balai Kartini
- Location: Jakarta, Indonesia
- Dates: 7–12 October
- Competitors: 84 from 9 nations

Medalists
gold medal	Iran (men); Japan (women)
silver medal	China (men); China (women)
bronze medal	South Korea (men); Iran (women)

Goalball at the 2018 Asian Para Games in Jakarta took place between 7 and 12 October 2018.

== Medalists ==
Event	Gold	Silver	Bronze
Men	Iran; Hasan Jafari; Mohsen Jalilvand; Mohammad Mansouri; Mohammad Parnia; Mostafa Shahbazi; Mohammad Soranji	China; Cai Changgui; Chen Liangliang; Hu Mingyao; Shao Shuai; Yang Mingyuan; Yu Qinquan	South Korea; Hong Sung-wook; Im Hak-su; Jeong In-tae; Kim Chan-woo; Kim Chul-hwan; Son Won-jin
Women	Japan; Eiko Kakehata; Masae Komiya; Tomoe Takada; Yuki Temma; Rie Urata; Haruka Wakasugi	China; Cao Zhenhua; Chen Fengqing; Wang Chunhua; Wang Shasha; Zhang Wei; Zhang Xiling	Iran; Tayebeh Esteki; Fatemeh Ghamsari; Zeinab Ghanbari; Maryam Hesam; Maryam Jafarzadeh; Samira Jalilvand

== Results ==
Detail Results :

=== Men ===
==== Group 1 ====
Pos	Team	Pld	W	D	L	GF	GA	GD	Pts	Qualification
1	China	3	3	0	0	32	4	+28	9	Semi-finals
2	South Korea	3	2	0	1	37	26	+11	6	Semi-finals
3	Thailand	3	1	0	2	23	37	−14	3	
4	Indonesia (H)	3	0	0	3	21	46	−25	0	

Source: Schedule and results
(H) Hosts

7 October 2018; 10:00	China	10–2	South Korea	Balai Kartini, Jakarta
7 October 2018; 10:00		Report		Balai Kartini, Jakarta

7 October 2018; 14:00	Thailand	16–10	Indonesia	Balai Kartini, Jakarta
7 October 2018; 14:00		Report		Balai Kartini, Jakarta

8 October 2018; 12:00	China	10–0	Thailand	Balai Kartini, Jakarta
8 October 2018; 12:00		Report		Balai Kartini, Jakarta

9 October 2018; 10:00	China	12–2	Indonesia	Balai Kartini, Jakarta
9 October 2018; 10:00		Report		Balai Kartini, Jakarta

9 October 2018; 14:00	South Korea	17–7	Thailand	Balai Kartini, Jakarta
9 October 2018; 14:00		Report		Balai Kartini, Jakarta

10 October 2018; 12:00	South Korea	18–9	Indonesia	Balai Kartini, Jakarta
10 October 2018; 12:00		Report		Balai Kartini, Jakarta

==== Group 2 ====
Pos	Team	Pld	W	D	L	GF	GA	GD	Pts	Qualification
1	Iran	3	2	1	0	34	19	+15	7	Semi-finals
2	Japan	3	2	1	0	23	16	+7	7	Semi-finals
3	Iraq	3	1	0	2	33	36	−3	3	
4	Qatar	3	0	0	3	21	40	−19	0	

Source: Schedule and results

7 October 2018; 12:00	Iran	5–5	Japan	Balai Kartini, Jakarta
7 October 2018; 12:00		Report		Balai Kartini, Jakarta

7 October 2018; 16:00	Qatar	11–18	Iraq	Balai Kartini, Jakarta
7 October 2018; 16:00		Report		Balai Kartini, Jakarta

8 October 2018; 10:00	Iran	15–5	Qatar	Balai Kartini, Jakarta
8 October 2018; 10:00		Report		Balai Kartini, Jakarta

8 October 2018; 14:00	Japan	11–6	Iraq	Balai Kartini, Jakarta
8 October 2018; 14:00		Report		Balai Kartini, Jakarta

9 October 2018; 12:00	Iran	14–9	Iraq	Balai Kartini, Jakarta
9 October 2018; 12:00		Report		Balai Kartini, Jakarta

10 October 2018; 10:00	Japan	7–5	Qatar	Balai Kartini, Jakarta
10 October 2018; 10:00		Report		Balai Kartini, Jakarta

==== Final Round ====
Semi-finals
11 October
China	9
Japan	3
11 October
Iran	10
South Korea	8

Gold medal
12 October
China	3
Iran	8
Bronze medal
12 October
Japan	3
South Korea	8

Semi-finals

11 October 2018; 11:30	China	9–3	Japan	Balai Kartini, Jakarta
11 October 2018; 11:30		Report		Balai Kartini, Jakarta

11 October 2018; 14:30	Iran	10–8	South Korea	Balai Kartini, Jakarta
11 October 2018; 14:30		Report		Balai Kartini, Jakarta

Bronze Medal Match

12 October 2018; 10:30	Japan	3–8	South Korea	Balai Kartini, Jakarta
12 October 2018; 10:30		Report		Balai Kartini, Jakarta

Gold Medal Match

12 October 2018; 16:00	China	3–8	Iran	Balai Kartini, Jakarta
12 October 2018; 16:00		Report		Balai Kartini, Jakarta

=== Women ===
==== Ranking Round ====
Pos	Team	Pld	W	D	L	GF	GA	GD	Pts	Qualification
1	Japan	5	5	0	0	37	7	+30	15	Semi-finals
2	China	5	4	0	1	46	8	+38	12	Semi-finals
3	Iran	5	2	1	2	28	21	+7	7	Semi-finals
4	Thailand	5	2	1	2	22	27	−5	7	Semi-finals
5	Indonesia (H)	5	1	0	4	6	44	−38	3	
6	Laos	5	0	0	5	5	37	−32	0	

Source: Schedule and results
(H) Hosts

7 October 2018; 9:00	China	3–4	Japan	Balai Kartini, Jakarta
7 October 2018; 9:00		Report		Balai Kartini, Jakarta

7 October 2018; 11:00	Iran	5–5	Thailand	Balai Kartini, Jakarta
7 October 2018; 11:00		Report		Balai Kartini, Jakarta

7 October 2018; 13:00	Laos	2–3	Indonesia	Balai Kartini, Jakarta
7 October 2018; 13:00		Report		Balai Kartini, Jakarta

7 October 2018; 15:00	China	11–1	Thailand	Balai Kartini, Jakarta
7 October 2018; 15:00		Report		Balai Kartini, Jakarta

8 October 2018; 9:00	Japan	6–2	Iran	Balai Kartini, Jakarta
8 October 2018; 9:00		Report		Balai Kartini, Jakarta

8 October 2018; 11:00	China	11–1	Laos	Balai Kartini, Jakarta
8 October 2018; 11:00		Report		Balai Kartini, Jakarta

8 October 2018; 13:00	Thailand	11–2	Indonesia	Balai Kartini, Jakarta
8 October 2018; 13:00		Report		Balai Kartini, Jakarta

8 October 2018; 15:00	Japan	7–2	Thailand	Balai Kartini, Jakarta
8 October 2018; 15:00		Report		Balai Kartini, Jakarta

9 October 2018; 9:00	China	10–1	Iran	Balai Kartini, Jakarta
9 October 2018; 9:00		Report		Balai Kartini, Jakarta

9 October 2018; 11:00	Japan	10–0	Laos	Balai Kartini, Jakarta
9 October 2018; 11:00		Report		Balai Kartini, Jakarta

9 October 2018; 13:00	China	11–1	Indonesia	Balai Kartini, Jakarta
9 October 2018; 13:00		Report		Balai Kartini, Jakarta

9 October 2018; 15:00	Iran	10–0	Laos	Balai Kartini, Jakarta
9 October 2018; 15:00		Report		Balai Kartini, Jakarta

10 October 2018; 9:00	Japan	10–0	Indonesia	Balai Kartini, Jakarta
10 October 2018; 9:00		Report		Balai Kartini, Jakarta

10 October 2018; 11:00	Thailand	3–2	Laos	Balai Kartini, Jakarta
10 October 2018; 11:00		Report		Balai Kartini, Jakarta

10 October 2018; 13:00	Iran	10–0	Indonesia	Balai Kartini, Jakarta
10 October 2018; 13:00		Report		Balai Kartini, Jakarta

==== Final Round ====
Semi-finals
11 October
Japan	9
Thailand	0
11 October
China	6
Iran	2

Gold medal
12 October
Japan	5
China	3
Bronze medal
12 October
Thailand	3
Iran	4

Semi-finals

11 October 2018; 10:00	Japan	9–0	Thailand	Balai Kartini, Jakarta
11 October 2018; 10:00		Report		Balai Kartini, Jakarta

11 October 2018; 13:00	China	6–2	Iran	Balai Kartini, Jakarta
11 October 2018; 13:00		Report		Balai Kartini, Jakarta

Bronze Medal Match

12 October 2018; 9:00	Thailand	3–4	Iran	Balai Kartini, Jakarta
12 October 2018; 9:00		Report		Balai Kartini, Jakarta

Gold Medal Match

12 October 2018; 14:30	Japan	5–3	China	Balai Kartini, Jakarta
12 October 2018; 14:30		Report		Balai Kartini, Jakarta
