= Judo at the 2018 Asian Para Games =

Paralympic judo at the 2018 Asian Para Games
- Venue: Jakarta International Expo
- Location: Jakarta, Indonesia
- Dates: 8–11 October

Paralympic judo at the 2018 Asian Para Games in Jakarta took place between 8 and 11 October 2018.

== Medal table ==
One silver medal was not awarded due to doping violation of the original gold medalist of men's 81 kg.

* Host nation (Indonesia)

| Rank | NPC | Gold | Silver | Bronze | Total |
|---|---|---|---|---|---|
| 1 | South Korea (KOR) | 8 | 2 | 4 | 14 |
| 2 | Uzbekistan (UZB) | 4 | 5 | 5 | 14 |
| 3 | Iran (IRI) | 2 | 2 | 3 | 7 |
| 4 | China (CHN) | 1 | 2 | 4 | 7 |
| 5 | Japan (JPN) | 0 | 1 | 8 | 9 |
| 6 | Kazakhstan (KAZ) | 0 | 1 | 2 | 3 |
| 7 | Mongolia (MGL) | 0 | 0 | 3 | 3 |
| 8 | Chinese Taipei (TPE) | 0 | 0 | 1 | 1 |
| Totals (8 entries) | | 15 | 13 | 30 | 58 |

== Medalists ==
=== Men ===
| Event | Gold | Silver | Bronze |
|---|---|---|---|
| 60 kg | Sherzod Namozov; Uzbekistan | Lee Min-jae; South Korea | Takaaki Hirai; Japan |
| 60 kg | Sherzod Namozov; Uzbekistan | Lee Min-jae; South Korea | Seyed Meysam Banitaba; Iran |
| 66 kg | Utkirjon Nigmatov; Uzbekistan | Azamat Turumbetov; Kazakhstan | Aajim Munkhbat; Mongolia |
| 66 kg | Utkirjon Nigmatov; Uzbekistan | Azamat Turumbetov; Kazakhstan | Reza Gholami; Iran |
| 73 kg | Yang Seung-jun; South Korea | Feruz Sayidov; Uzbekistan | Temirzhan Daulet; Kazakhstan |
| 73 kg | Yang Seung-jun; South Korea | Feruz Sayidov; Uzbekistan | Takamasa Nagai; Japan |
| 81 kg | Lee Jung-min; South Korea | not awarded | Seyed Omid Jafari; Iran |
| 81 kg | Lee Jung-min; South Korea | not awarded | Aramitsu Kitazono; Japan |
| 90 kg | Vahid Nouri; Iran | Shukhrat Boboev; Uzbekistan | Demchigdorj Erdenebayar; Mongolia |
| 90 kg | Vahid Nouri; Iran | Shukhrat Boboev; Uzbekistan | Li Yanchen; China |
| 100 kg | Ehsan Mousanezhad; Iran | Choi Gwang-geun; South Korea | Sharif Khalilov; Uzbekistan |
| 100 kg | Ehsan Mousanezhad; Iran | Choi Gwang-geun; South Korea | Yoshikazu Matsumoto; Japan |
| +100 kg | Shirin Sharipov; Uzbekistan | Mohammadreza Kheirollahzadeh; Iran | Song Woo-hyeok; South Korea |
| +100 kg | Shirin Sharipov; Uzbekistan | Mohammadreza Kheirollahzadeh; Iran | Lee Seung-soo; South Korea |
| Team | South Korea; Lee Min-jae; Yang Seung-jun; Lee Jung-min; Choi Gwang-geun; Song Woo-hyeok | Iran; Reza Gholami; Ali Abbasnejad; Seyed Omid Jafari; Vahid Nouri; Mohammadreza Kheirollahzadeh | Kazakhstan; Anuar Sariyev; Azamat Turumbetov; Temirzhan Daulet; Temirbolat Tashekenov; Yergali Shamey |
| Team | South Korea; Lee Min-jae; Yang Seung-jun; Lee Jung-min; Choi Gwang-geun; Song Woo-hyeok | Iran; Reza Gholami; Ali Abbasnejad; Seyed Omid Jafari; Vahid Nouri; Mohammadreza Kheirollahzadeh | Uzbekistan; Sherzod Namozov; Utkirjon Nigmatov; Nurbek Mirzaev; Shukhrat Boboev; Sharif Khalilov |

=== Women ===
| Event | Gold | Silver | Bronze |
|---|---|---|---|
| 48 kg | Choi Soo-hee; South Korea | Lobar Khurramova; Uzbekistan | Lee Kai-lin; Chinese Taipei |
| 48 kg | Choi Soo-hee; South Korea | Lobar Khurramova; Uzbekistan | Li Liqing; China |
| 52 kg | Song Na-yeong; South Korea | Ayumi Ishii; Japan | Li Yanqing; China |
| 52 kg | Song Na-yeong; South Korea | Ayumi Ishii; Japan | Sevinch Salaeva; Uzbekistan |
| 57 kg | Lin Zhilian; China | Nafisa Sheripboeva; Uzbekistan | Kim Seo-hyun; South Korea |
| 57 kg | Lin Zhilian; China | Nafisa Sheripboeva; Uzbekistan | Junko Hirose; Japan |
| 63 kg | Jin Song-lee; South Korea | Wang Yue; China | Parvina Samandarova; Uzbekistan |
| 63 kg | Jin Song-lee; South Korea | Wang Yue; China | Hiroko Kudo; Japan |
| 70 kg | Vasila Aliboeva; Uzbekistan | Zhou Qian; China | Atsumi Nishimura; Japan |
| 70 kg | Vasila Aliboeva; Uzbekistan | Zhou Qian; China | Lee Ga-eun; South Korea |
| +70 kg | Park Ha-yeong; South Korea | not awarded | Feruzakhon Yusupova; Uzbekistan |
| +70 kg | Park Ha-yeong; South Korea | not awarded | Nyamaa Altantsetseg; Mongolia |
| Team | South Korea; Song Na-yeong; Jin Song-lee; Park Ha-yeong | Uzbekistan; Sevinch Salaeva; Parvina Samandarova; Vasila Aliboeva | Japan; Ayumi Ishii; Junko Hirose; Atsumi Nishimura |
| Team | South Korea; Song Na-yeong; Jin Song-lee; Park Ha-yeong | Uzbekistan; Sevinch Salaeva; Parvina Samandarova; Vasila Aliboeva | China; Li Liqing; Lin Zhilian; Zhou Qian |

== See also ==
- Judo at the 2018 Asian Games
