= Cambodia at the 2022 Asian Para Games =

- IPC code: CAM
- NPC: National Paralympic Committee of Cambodia

in Hangzhou, China 22 October 2023 – 28 October 2023
- Competitors: 24 in 6 sports
- Medals: Gold 0 Silver 0 Bronze 0 Total 0

Asian Para Games appearances
- 2010; 2014; 2018; 2022

Cambodia competed at the 2022 Asian Para Games in Hangzhou, Zhejiang, China, from 22 October 2023 to 28 October 2023.

The event was originally scheduled to be held in 2022 but due to COVID-19 pandemic cases rising in China the event was postponed and rescheduled.

The delegation consisted of 24 athletes in six sports. The men's sitting volleyball and women's basketball teams were projected to be Cambodia's best chance for a medal.

== Wheelchair basketball ==
Summary

Team	Event	Group Stage						Final / BM / CS5	
Team	Event	Opposition Score	Opposition Score	Opposition Score	Opposition Score	Opposition Score	Rank	Opposition Score	Rank
Cambodia women's	Women's tournament	Laos; W 65–35	Japan; L 18–88	China; L 28–88	Iran; L 42–47	Thailand; L 14–59	5	Laos; W 63–20	5

Preliminary Rounds – Group A

Pos	Team	Pld	W	L	PF	PA	PD	Pts	Qualification
1	China (H)	5	5	0	374	149	+225	10	Gold medal match
2	Japan	5	4	1	381	138	+243	9	Gold medal match
3	Thailand	5	3	2	244	221	+23	8	Bronze medal match
4	Iran	5	2	3	201	277	−76	7	Bronze medal match
5	Cambodia	5	1	4	167	317	−150	6	Qualified for the Fifth place game
6	Laos	5	0	5	123	388	−265	5	Qualified for the Fifth place game

Source: HAPGOC
Rules for classification: 1) Points; 2) Head-to-head results; 3) Points difference; 4) Points scored.
(H) Hosts

19 October
9:30 UTC+8

Report

Laos	35–65	Cambodia
Scoring by quarter: 6–17, 5–17, 14–16, 10–15

20 October
15:30 UTC+8

Report

Japan	88–18	Cambodia
Scoring by quarter: 25–2, 26–2, 18–4, 19–10

21 October
15:00 UTC+8

Report

Cambodia	28–88	China
Scoring by quarter: 8–24, 14–22, 0–20, 6–22

24 October
11:45 UTC+8

Report

Cambodia	42–47	Iran
Scoring by quarter: 10–7, 14–10, 3–14, 15–16

25 October
16:15 UTC+8

Report

Thailand	59–14	Cambodia
Scoring by quarter: 11–0, 14–2, 20–4, 14–8

== See also ==
- Cambodia at the 2022 Asian Games
