= Akira Toyoshima =

Japanese wheelchair basketball player

Akira Toyoshima (豊島 英, Toyoshima Akira) is a Japanese wheelchair basketball player who plays for the Japan men's national wheelchair basketball team.

== Biography ==
Akira Toyoshima was working as an accountant at the Fukushima Daiichi Nuclear Power Plant when the 2011 Tōhoku earthquake and tsunami struck Japan. The tsunami eventually claimed the lives of thousands of people. Toyoshima said that he was organizing important and urgent documents in the main office building of the Fukushima Daiichi Nuclear Power Plant as a member of the accounting team. The March 2011 tsunami shattered the hopes of Toyoshima's goal of competing at the 2012 Summer Paralympics. He was directly affected by the impact of the tsunami and aftershocks. He pointed out that his ambition to compete at the 2012 Summer Paralympics became an afterthought after what transpired following the 2011 tsunami. He took note of the number of people who had to live in emergency shelters after the disaster which prompted him to withdraw from the 2012 London Paralympics.

He inspiration to pursue his dreams in wheelchair basketball came from footballer Aya Sameshima who played an instrumental role in helping Japan win the 2011 FIFA Women's World Cup. Japan stunned America in the final which was decided with a penalty shootout. Full time score was 2–2. Aya Sameshima happened to be one of Akira Toyoshima's colleagues while working at the Fukushima Daiichi Nuclear Power Plant.

== Career ==
He was part of the Japan men's wheelchair basketball team that competed at the 2010 Wheelchair Basketball World Championship. He represented Japan at the 2010 Asian Para Games and was a key member of the Japanese team that won a gold medal in the men's wheelchair basketball tournament at the 2010 Asian Para Games.

He represented Japan at the 2016 Summer Paralympics and was part of the Japan squad which competed in the men's wheelchair basketball tournament at the 2016 Summer Paralympics. He was a vital member of the Japanese side that won a bronze medal at the 2017 IWBF Asia-Oceania Championships. Japan did not reach the final of that tournament after losing to Iran in the semi-final with a score of 80–76 in a tight contest.

He was picked for the Japan's squad which took part in the 2018 Wheelchair Basketball World Championship. Japan finished in ninth position. He represented Japan at the 2018 Asian Para Games where Japan won the silver medal against Iran in a closely fought contest in the final. Japan lost with a score of 68–66 despite taking an early lead in the match by securing the first set 21–12.

He represented Japan at the 2020 Summer Paralympics and was appointed as the captain of the Japan's wheelchair basketball squad. His appointment as national captain came as a surprise since he was uncertain if his availability for the duration of the 2020 Summer Paralympics. Above all expectations, Japa went on to secure an historic Paralympic silver medal at the 2020 Summer Paralympics after emerging as runners-up to the US in the final. Japan lost with a score of 64–60. Japan initially had the upper hand in the Paralympic wheelchair basketball final against the United States, but the USA recovered from a five-point deficit in the fourth quarter, trailing with 56–51, to defeat Japan 64–60 at full time.
