= Archery at the 2018 Asian Para Games =

- Venue: Gelora Bung Karno Archery Field
- Location: Jakarta, Indonesia
- Dates: 10–11 October

Archery at the 2018 Asian Para Games was held in Jakarta between 10 and 11 October 2018.

== Medal table ==
* Host nation (Indonesia)

Rank	NPC	Gold	Silver	Bronze	Total
1	China (CHN)	6	2	2	10
2	Iran (IRI)	2	2	1	5
3	India (IND)	1	0	0	1
4	South Korea (KOR)	0	3	4	7
5	Japan (JPN)	0	2	0	2
Totals (5 entries)		9	9	7	25

== Medals (2010-2018) ==
Rank	Nation	Gold	Silver	Bronze	Total
1	China (CHN)	9	6	5	20
2	Iran (IRI)	8	3	4	15
3	South Korea (KOR)	4	10	8	22
4	Japan (JPN)	2	2	1	5
5	Iraq (IRQ)	1	0	1	2
6	India (IND)	1	0	0	1
7	Hong Kong (HKG)	0	1	1	2
8	Thailand (THA)	0	1	0	1
9	Malaysia (MAS)	0	0	1	1
Totals (9 entries)		25	23	21	69

== Medalists ==
=== Men ===
Event	Class	Gold	Silver	Bronze
Individual	W1	Zandi Mohammadreza; Iran	Li Ji; China	Majid Kakoosh; Iran
Individual compound	W2/ST	Ai Xinliang; China	Lee Ouk-soo; South Korea	Kweon Hyun-ju; South Korea
Individual recurve	W2/ST	Harvinder Singh; India	Zhao Lixue; China	Kim Min-su; South Korea

=== Women ===
Event	Class	Gold	Silver	Bronze
Individual	W1	Chen Minyi; China	Aya Shinohara; Japan	not awarded
Individual compound	W2/ST	Lin Yueshan; China	Jeong Jin-young; South Korea	Zhou Jiamin; China
Individual recurve	W2/ST	Wu Chunyan; China	Zahra Nemati; Iran	Jo Jang-moon; South Korea

=== Mixed ===
Event	Class	Gold	Silver	Bronze
Team	W1	China; Chen Minyi; Li Ji	South Korea; Kim Ok-geum; Park Hong-jo; Jang Dae-sun	not awarded
Team compound	W2/ST	China; Ai Xinliang; Zhou Jiamin	Iran; Hadi Nori; Razieh Shir Mohammadi; Somayeh Abbaspour	South Korea; Jeong Jin-young; Lee Ouk-soo; Choi Na-mi
Team recurve	W2/ST	Iran; Zahra Nemati; Gholamreza Rahimi; Pouriya Jalalipour	Japan; Chika Shigesada; Tomohiro Ueyama; Takahiro Hasegawa	China; Wu Chunyan; Zhao Lixue

== See also ==
- Archery at the 2017 ASEAN Para Games
- Archery at the 2018 Asian Games
