= Iran at the 2018 Asian Para Games =

- IPC code: IRN
- Website: www.paralympic.ir (in Persian and English)

6–13 October 2018
- Competitors: 210 in 13 sports
- Flag bearer: Sareh Javanmardi
- Medals Ranked 3rd: Gold 51 Silver 43 Bronze 43 Total 137

Asian Para Games appearances (overview)
- 2010; 2014; 2018; 2022

Youth appearances
- 2009; 2013; 2017; 2021

Iran participated at the 2018 Asian Para Games which was held in Jakarta, Indonesia from 6 to 13 October 2018. In July 2019, Iran had a bronze medal upgraded to silver due to doping violation of an Uzbek athlete.

== Competitors ==
A total of 210 athletes, consisting of 137 men and 73 women, competed for Iran in the 2018 Asian Para Games in 13 sports. The following is a list showing the number of competitors by sport and gender.:

Sport	Men	Women	Total
Archery	6	3	9
Athletics	60	23	83
Boccia	3	3	6
Chess	6	6	12
Cycling	4	0	4
Goalball	6	6	12
Judo	6	6	12
Powerlifting	10	0	10
Shooting	1	6	7
Sitting volleyball	12	12	24
Swimming	6	0	6
Table tennis	4	2	6
Wheelchair basketball	12	12	24
Total	137	73	210

== Medal summary ==
Medal	Name	Sport	Event	Date
Gold	Mohammad Reza Zandi	Archery	Men's Individual W1 Open	October 10
Gold	Zahra Nemati; Gholamreza Rahimi	Archery	Mixed Team Recurve Open W2/ST	October 11
Gold	Younes Seifipour	Athletics	Men's Club Throw F32	October 8
Gold	Alireza Ghaleh Nasseri	Athletics	Men's Discus Throw F54/55/56	October 8
Gold	Ozra Mahdavikiya	Athletics	Women's 1500M T12/13	October 8
Gold	Vahid Alinajimi	Athletics	Men's 200m T12	October 8
Gold	Mahdi Olad	Athletics	Men's Shot Put F11	October 9
Gold	Mohammadreza Ahmadi	Athletics	Men's Shot Put F33	October 9
Gold	Farzad Sepahvand	Athletics	Men's Discus Throw F43/44, F62/64	October 9
Gold	Hossein Khorsandamiri	Athletics	Men's Discus Throw F51/52/53	October 9
Gold	Batoul Jahangiri	Athletics	Women's Shot Put F33	October 9
Gold	Mahdi Olad	Athletics	Men's Discus Throw F11	October 10
Gold	Hashemiyeh Motaghian	Athletics	Women's Discus Throw F56/57	October 10
Gold	Alireza Mokhtari	Athletics	Men's Shot Put F53	October 10
Gold	Aref Baharvand	Athletics	Men's Shot Put F36	October 10
Gold	Mahnaz Aimini	Athletics	Women's Javelin Throw F57	October 10
Gold	Arezoo Rahimi	Athletics	Women's Shot Put F32	October 11
Gold	Omid Zarifsanayei	Athletics	Men's 400m T13	October 11
Gold	Mehdi Alizadeh	Athletics	Men's Javelin Throw F33/34	October 11
Gold	Hamed Amiri	Athletics	Men's Shot Put F54/55	October 11
Gold	Sajad Mohammadian	Athletics	Men's Shot Put F42/61/63	October 11
Gold	Mohammad Alvanpour	Athletics	Men's Javelin Throw F56/57	October 11
Gold	Vahid Alinajimi	Athletics	Men's 400m T12	October 11
Gold	Hamid Eslami	Athletics	Men's 1500M T11	October 11
Gold	Elnaz Darabian	Athletics	Women's Discus Throw F51/52/53	October 12
Gold	Saman Pakbaz	Athletics	Men's Discus Throw F12	October 12
Gold	Peyman Nasiri Bazanjani	Athletics	Men's 1500M T20	October 12
Gold	Eshrat Kordestani	Athletics	Women's Shot Put F56/57	October 12
Gold	Hamed Amiri	Athletics	Men's Javelin Throw F53/54	October 12
Gold	Omid Karimi	Chess	Men's Individual Standard VI B2/B3	October 10
Gold	Atefeh Naghavi	Chess	Women's Individual Standard VI B2/B3	October 10
Gold	Atefeh Naghavi; Fariba Zendehboudi; Fatemeh Barghoul	Chess	Women's Team Standard VI B2/B3	October 10
Gold	Atefeh Naghavi; Fariba Zendehboudi; Fatemeh Barghoul	Chess	Women's Team Rapid VI - B2/B3	October 12
Gold	Iran men's national goalball team: Majid Fallah; Hassan Jafari; Mohsen Jalilvand; Mohammad Mansouri; Mostafa Shahbazi; Mohammad Soranji	Goalball	Men's Team	October 12
Gold	Vahid Nouri	Judo	Men's 90 Kg	October 10
Gold	Ehsan Mousanezhad	Judo	Men's 100 Kg	October 10
Gold	Amir Jafari	Powerlifting	Men's 59 Kg	October 8
Gold	Rouhollah Rostami	Powerlifting	Men's 72 Kg	October 9
Gold	Seyed Hamed Solhi	Powerlifting	Men's 97 Kg	October 12
Gold	Siamand Rahman	Powerlifting	Men's +107 Kg	October 12
Gold	Sareh Javanmardi	Shooting	P4 - Mixed 50M Free Pistol - SH1	October 8
Gold	Roghayeh Shojaei	Shooting	R2 - Women's 10M Air Rifle Standing - SH1	October 8
Gold	Sareh Javanmardi	Shooting	P2 - Women's 10M Air Pistol - SH1	October 9
Gold	Iran men's national sitting volleyball team: Meisam Alipour; Davoud Alipourian; Mahdi Babadi; Sadegh Bigdeli; Hossein Farzaneh; Hossein Golestani; Majid Lashkari; Morteza Mehrzad; Mohammad Nemati; Ramezan Selahi; Mohammadreza Sobhaninia; Isa Zirahi	Siiting volleyball	Men's Team	October 11
Gold	Shahin Izadyar	Swimming	Men's 100M Butterfly S10	October 7
Gold	Shahin Izadyar	Swimming	Men's 100M Freestyle S10	October 8
Gold	Shahin Izadyar	Swimming	Men's 200m Individual Medley SM10	October 9
Gold	Shahin Izadyar	Swimming	Men's 100m Breaststroke SB9	October 10
Gold	Shahin Izadyar	Swimming	Men's 50m Freestyle S10	October 10
Gold	Shahin Izadyar	Swimming	Men's 100M Backstroke S10	October 12
Gold	Iran men's national wheelchair basketball team: Hassan Abdi; Morteza Abedi; Morteza Ebrahimi; Abdoljalil Gharanjik; Omid Hadizhar; Hakim Mansouri; Mohammad Mohammad Nezhad; Vahid Saadatpour; Mohammadhassan Sayari; Mohammad Sehi; Mohsen Tolouei; Adel Torfi	Wheelchair basketball	Men's Team	October 13
Silver	Zahra Nemati	Archery	Women's Individual Recurve Open W2/ST	October 10
Silver	Hadi Nori; Razieh Shirmohammadi	Archery	Mixed Team Compound Open W2/ST	October 11
Silver	Behzad Azizi	Athletics	Men's Javelin Throw F12/13	October 8
Silver	Jalil Bagheri Jeddi	Athletics	Men's Discus Throw F54/55/56	October 8
Silver	Javid Ehsani Shakib	Athletics	Men's Discus Throw F57	October 8
Silver	Elham Salehi	Athletics	Women's Javelin Throw F53/54	October 8
Silver	Seyed Aliasghar Javanmaradi	Athletics	Men's Shot Put F35	October 8
Silver	Ali Olfatnia	Athletics	Men's 200M T37	October 8
Silver	Nourmohammad Arekhi	Athletics	Men's Shot Put F11	October 9
Silver	Hajar Safarzadeh	Athletics	Women's 200m T12	October 9
Silver	Saman Pakbaz	Athletics	Men's Shot Put F12	October 9
Silver	Hashemiyeh Motaghian	Athletics	Women's Javelin Throw F55/56	October 9
Silver	Asadollah Azimi	Athletics	Men's Discus Throw F51/52/53	October 9
Silver	Davoudali Ghasemi	Athletics	Men's 100m T37	October 9
Silver	Siamak Saleh Farajzadeh	Athletics	Men's Shot Put F34	October 10
Silver	Asadollah Azimi	Athletics	Men's Shot Put F53	October 10
Silver	Hashem Rastegari	Athletics	Men's 400m T37	October 10
Silver	Mohsen Kaedi	Athletics	Men's Javelin Throw F33/34	October 11
Silver	Jalil Bagheri Jeddi	Athletics	Men's Shot Put F54/55	October 11
Silver	Amanolah Papi	Athletics	Men's Javelin Throw F56/57	October 11
Silver	Hajar Safarzadeh	Athletics	Women's 400m T12	October 11
Silver	Faezeh Kermani	Athletics	Women's Javelin Throw F33/34	October 11
Silver	Marziyeh Sedghi	Athletics	Women's Shot Put F54	October 12
Silver	Masoud Heidari	Athletics	Men's Discus Throw F12	October 12
Silver	Fereshteh Moradi	Athletics	Women's Shot Put F34	October 12
Silver	Hormoz Seidi	Athletics	Men's Javelin Throw F37/38	October 12
Silver	Abdolreza Jokar	Athletics	Men's Javelin Throw F53/54	October 12
Silver	Fariba Zendehboudi	Chess	Women's Individual Standard VI B2/B3	October 10
Silver	Leila Zarezadeh; Maliheh Safaei; Zahra Mohammadi Rad	Chess	Women's Team Standard VI B1	October 10
Silver	Omid Karimi; Majid Bagheri; Alireza Ghourchibeygi	Chess	Men's Team Standard VI B2/B3	October 10
Silver	Maliheh Safaei	Chess	Women's Individual Rapid VI - B1	October 12
Silver	Fatemeh Barghoul	Chess	Women's Individual Rapid VI - B2/B3	October 12
Silver	Leila Zarezadeh; Maliheh Safaei; Zahra Mohammadi Rad	Chess	Women's Team Rapid VI - B1	October 12
Silver	Mohammadreza Kheirollahzadeh	Judo	Men's +100 Kg	October 10
Silver	Reza Gholami; Ali Abbasnejad; Seyed Omid Jafari; Vahid Nouri; Mohammadreza Kheirollahzadeh	Judo	Men's Team	October 11
Silver	Seyed Yousef Yousefi	Powerlifting	Men's 59 Kg	October 8
Silver	Nader Moradi	Powerlifting	Men's 80 Kg	October 10
Silver	Aliakbar Gharibshi	Powerlifting	Men's 107 Kg	October 12
Silver	Mansour Pourmirzaei	Powerlifting	Men's +107 Kg	October 12
Silver	Samira Eram	Shooting	P2 - Women's 10M Air Pistol - SH1	October 9
Silver	Iran women's national sitting volleyball team: Zahra Danayetous; Mehri Fallahi; Nasrin Farhadi; Farzaneh Heidari; Batoul Jafarian; Fatemeh Jahani; Batoul Khalilzadeh; Zeinab Maleki; Zahra Nejatiaref; Neda Panjehbashi; Masoumeh Shajarati; Masoumeh Zarei	Siiting volleyball	Women's Team	October 11
Silver	Shahin Izadyar	Swimming	Men's 400m Freestyle S10	October 11
Silver	Zahra Bornaki	Athletics	Women's Long Jump T45/46/47	October 8
Bronze	Majid Kakoosh	Archery	Men's Individual W1 Open	October 10
Bronze	Seyed Erfan Hosseini	Athletics	Men's Javelin Throw F12/13	October 8
Bronze	Ali Omidi	Athletics	Men's Javelin Throw F42-44/61-64	October 8
Bronze	Hamed Amiri	Athletics	Men's Discus Throw F54/55/56	October 8
Bronze	Omid Zarifsanayei	Athletics	Men's 200M T13	October 8
Bronze	Davoudali Ghasemi	Athletics	Men's 200M T37	October 8
Bronze	Ozra Mahdavikia	Athletics	Women's Javelin Throw F12/13	October 9
Bronze	Solmaz Bazargan	Athletics	Women's Discus Throw F43/44, F62/64	October 9
Bronze	Mehdi Alizadeh	Athletics	Men's Shot Put F33	October 9
Bronze	Ahmad Ojaghlou	Athletics	Men's 200m T45/46/47	October 9
Bronze	Masoud Heidari	Athletics	Men's Shot Put F12	October 9
Bronze	Alireza Mokhtari	Athletics	Men's Discus Throw F51/52/53	October 9
Bronze	Omid Zarifsanayei	Athletics	Men's 100m T13	October 9
Bronze	Arian Lotfi	Athletics	Men's Discus Throw F11	October 10
Bronze	Farhad Kahrizi	Athletics	Men's 400m T36	October 10
Bronze	Davoudali Ghasemi	Athletics	Men's 400m T37	October 10
Bronze	Ahmad Ojaghlou	Athletics	Men's 100m T45/46/47	October 10
Bronze	Hajar Safarzadeh	Athletics	Women's 100m T12	October 10
Bronze	Amir Khosravani	Athletics	Men's Long Jump T12	October 11
Bronze	Ozra Mahdavikia	Athletics	Men's 400m T11	October 11
Bronze	Zhila Yousefi	Athletics	Women's Discus Throw F40/41	October 11
Bronze	Mohammad Khalvandi	Athletics	Men's Javelin Throw F56/57	October 11
Bronze	Batoul Jahangiri	Athletics	Women's Javelin Throw F33/34	October 11
Bronze	Shahla Hadidi	Athletics	Women's Shot Put F54	October 12
Bronze	Javad Hardani	Athletics	Men's Javelin Throw F37/38	October 12
Bronze	Amin Abdolpour	Athletics	Men's 1500M T45/46	October 12
Bronze	Parvin Moghaddam	Athletics	Women's Shot Put F55	October 12
Bronze	Younes Seifipour	Athletics	Men's Shot Put F32	October 12
Bronze	Mikaeil Dayani	Athletics	Men's 5000M T12/13	October 12
Bronze	Leila Zarezadeh	Chess	Women's Individual Standard VI B1	October 10
Bronze	Fatemeh Barghoul	Chess	Women's Individual Standard VI B2/B3	October 10
Bronze	Erfan Mohamadalizadeh; Mehdi Roumifard; Hassanali Ghadiri	Chess	Men's Team Standard VI B1	October 10
Bronze	Fariba Zendehboudi	Chess	Women's Individual Rapid VI - B2/B3	October 12
Bronze	Mahdi Mohammadi	Cucling	Men's C5 Individual Pursuit 4000M	October 12
Bronze	Iran women's national goalball team: Tayyebeh Estaki; Fatemeh Ghamsari; Zeinab Ghanbari; Maryam Hesamabadi; Maryam Jafarzadeh; Samira Jalilvand	Goalball	Women's Team	October 12
Bronze	Seyed Meysam Banitaba	Judo	Men's 60 Kg	October 8
Bronze	Reza Gholami	Judo	Men's 66 Kg	October 8
Bronze	Seyed Omid Jafari	Judo	Men's 81 Kg	October 9
Bronze	Hamzeh Mohammadi	Powerlifting	Men's 65 Kg	October 9
Bronze	Saman Razi	Powerlifting	Men's 107 Kg	October 12
Bronze	Mohammadhossein Karimi	Swimming	Men's 50M Freestyle S12	October 12
Bronze	Hassan Janfeshan	Table tennis	Men's Singles- TT 2	October 8

Medals by sport
Sport	1st place, gold medalist(s)	2nd place, silver medalist(s)	3rd place, bronze medalist(s)	Total
Athletics	27	26	28	81
Swimming	6	1	1	8
Chess	4	6	4	14
Powerlifting	4	4	2	10
Shooting	3	1	0	4
Judo	2	2	3	7
Archery	2	2	1	5
Sitting volleyball	1	1	0	2
Goalball	1	0	1	2
Wheelchair basketball	1	0	0	1
Cycling	0	0	1	1
Table tennis	0	0	1	1
Total	51	42	43	136

Medals by date
Day	Date	1st place, gold medalist(s)	2nd place, silver medalist(s)	3rd place, bronze medalist(s)	Total
Day 1	7 October	1	0	0	1
Day 2	8 October	8	7	9	24
Day 3	9 October	8	7	9	24
Day 4	10 October	13	9	9	31
Day 5	11 October	10	9	5	24
Day 6	12 October	10	10	11	31
Day 7	13 October	1	0	0	1
Total		51	42	43	136

Medals by gender
Gender	1st place, gold medalist(s)	2nd place, silver medalist(s)	3rd place, bronze medalist(s)	Total	Percentage
Male	37	26	31	94	69.12%
Female	12	15	12	39	28.68%
Mixed	2	1	0	3	2.20%
Total	51	42	43	136	100%

=== Multiple medalists ===
Name	Sport	Gold	Silver	Bronze	Total
Shahin Izadyar	Swimming	6	1	0	7
Atefeh Naghavi	Chess	3	0	0	3
Fatemeh Barghoul	Chess	2	1	1	4
Fariba Zendehboudi	Chess	2	1	1	4
Hamed Amiri	Athletics	2	0	1	3
Vahid Alinajimi	Athletics	2	0	0	2
Mahdi Olad	Athletics	2	0	0	2
Sareh Javanmardi	Shooting	2	0	0	2
Zahra Nemati	Archery	1	1	0	2
Hashemiyeh Motaghian	Athletics	1	1	0	2
Saman Pakbaz	Athletics	1	1	0	2
Omid Karimi	Chess	1	1	0	2
Vahid Nouri	Judo	1	1	0	2
Ozra Mahdavikiya	Athletics	1	0	2	3
Omid Zarifsanayei	Athletics	1	0	2	3
Mehdi Alizadeh	Athletics	1	0	1	2
Batoul Jahangiri	Athletics	1	0	1	2
Alireza Mokhtari	Athletics	1	0	1	2
Younes Seifipor	Athletics	1	0	1	2
Maliheh Safaei	Chess	0	3	0	3
Hajar Safarzadeh	Athletics	0	2	1	3
Leila Zarezadeh	Chess	0	2	1	3
Asadollah Azimi	Athletics	0	2	0	2
Jalil Bagheri Jeddi	Athletics	0	2	0	2
Zahra Mohammadi Rad	Chess	0	2	0	2
Mohammadreza Kheirollahzadeh	Judo	0	2	0	2
Davoudali Ghasemi	Athletics	0	1	2	3
Masoud Heidari	Athletics	0	1	1	2
Reza Gholami	Judo	0	1	1	2
Seyed Omid Jafari	Judo	0	1	1	2
Ahmad Ojaghlou	Athletics	0	0	2	2

== See also ==
- Iran at the 2018 Asian Games
- Iran at the 2018 Winter Paralympics
