= Afghanistan at the 2026 Asian Para Games =

- Flag of Afghanistan
- IPC code: AFG
- NPC: Afghanistan Paralympic Committee
- Website: www.afghanistan.paraolympics.50megs.com

in Aichi-Nagoya, Japan 18 October 2026 – 24 October 2026
- Competitors: 5 (5 men and 0 women) in 3 sports
- Flag bearer (closing): TBD
- Medals: Gold 0 Silver 0 Bronze 0 Total 0

Asian Para Games appearances (overview)
- 2010; 2014; 2018; 2022; 2026

Afghanistan is participating in the 2026 Asian Para Games, to be held in Nagoya, Aichi Prefecture, Japan, from 18 to 24 October 2026. Five athletes are representing Afghanistan at the Games.

== Competitors ==
Following is the list of sports and number of athletes that will participate in the upcoming edition:

Sport	Men	Women	Total
Powerlifting	2	-	2
Table tennis	1	-	1
Taekwondo	2	-	2
Total	5	0	5

== Powerlifting ==
=== Men ===
Athlete	Event	Attempt 1	Attempt 2	Attempt 3	Total	Rank
Din Mohammad Waziry	59 kg	~~90~~	100	~~106~~	100	10
Yousuf Khan Nabizada	88 kg	100	110	120	120	10

== Table Tennis ==
Singles

Player	Event	Group stage					Quarter-final	Semi-final	Final	
Player	Event	Opposition Score	Opposition Score	Opposition Score	Opposition Score	Rank	Opposition Score	Opposition Score	Opposition Score	Rank
Khalilurahman Hashmi	Men's C3	Glinbancheun (THA) L 0-3 _{(1-11, 2-11, 3-11)}	Kitagawa (JPN) L 0-3 _{(1-11, 3-11, 2-11)}	Did not advance						

== Taekwondo ==
Athlete	Event	Round of 16	Quarterfinal	Semifinal / Repechage Round	Final / BM	Rank
Athlete	Event	Opposition Score	Opposition Score	Opposition Score	Opposition Score	Rank
Ali Sajad Hamraz	Men's K44-58 kg	Htike Aung (MYA) W 2-0	Xiao (TPE) L 0-2	Khaulyet (MGL) L (WWD)	Did not advance	7
Mohammad Tamim Sharifi	Men's K44-63 kg	Zhumangali (KAZ) L 0-2	Did not advance			9
