= Cycling at the 2018 Asian Para Games =

Para-cycling at the 2018 Asian Para Games
- Venue: Sentul International Circuit (road); Jakarta International Velodrome (track)
- Location: Jakarta, Indonesia
- Dates: 8–13 October

Para-cycling at the 2018 Asian Para Games in Jakarta took place between 8 and 13 October 2018.

== Medal table ==
* Host nation (Indonesia)

Rank	NPC	Gold	Silver	Bronze	Total
1	China (CHN)	10	4	1	15
2	South Korea (KOR)	7	2	1	10
3	Malaysia (MAS)	5	8	4	17
4	Japan (JPN)	3	2	4	9
5	Indonesia (INA)*	1	8	8	17
6	Philippines (PHI)	1	0	2	3
7	United Arab Emirates (UAE)	0	2	0	2
8	India (IND)	0	0	1	1
8	Iran (IRI)	0	0	1	1
8	Singapore (SGP)	0	0	1	1
Totals (10 entries)		27	26	23	76

== Medalists ==
=== Road cycling ===
Men

Event	Class	Gold	Silver	Bronze
Time trial	B	Kazuhei Kimura; Japan	Mohd Khairul Hazwan; Malaysia	Herman Halawa; Indonesia
Time trial	C1–2	Liang Guihua; China	Shota Kawamoto; Japan	Li Zhangyu; China
Time trial	C3	Jin Yong-sik; South Korea	Saipul Anwar; Indonesia	not awarded
Time trial	C4	Wei Guoping; China	Fadli Immammuddin; Indonesia	Mohd Najib Turano; Malaysia
Road race	C4	Wei Guoping; China	Mohd Najib Turano; Malaysia	Godfrey Taberna; Philippines
Time trial	C5	Lai Shanzhang; China	Sufyan Saori; Indonesia	Arthus Bucay; Philippines
Road race	C5	Zuhairie Tarmizi; Malaysia	Lai Shanzhang; China	Martin Losu; Indonesia
Time trial	H4–5	Yoon Yeo-keun; South Korea	Rashed al-Dhaheri; United Arab Emirates	Somantri; Indonesia
Road race	H4–5	Yoon Yeo-keun; South Korea	Rashed al-Dhaheri; United Arab Emirates	Somantri; Indonesia

Women

Event	Class	Gold	Silver	Bronze
Time trial	B	Kim Ji-yeon; South Korea	Nur Azlia Syafinaz Zais; Malaysia	Sri Sugiyanti; Indonesia
Road race	B	Nur Azlia Syafinaz Zais; Malaysia	Sri Sugiyanti; Indonesia	Emily Lee Seok Bee; Singapore (Pilot:Sarah Tan)
Time trial	H2–4	Lee Do-yeon; South Korea	Wang Kea-hyun; South Korea	Ni Kadek Karyadewi; Indonesia
Road race	H2–4	Lee Do-yeon; South Korea	Wang Kea-hyun; South Korea	not awarded

=== Track cycling ===
Men

Event	Class	Gold	Silver	Bronze
Pursuit	B	Kazuhei Kimura; Japan	Mohd Khairul Hazwan; Malaysia	Herman Halawa; Indonesia
Kilo	B	Afiq Afify Rizan; Malaysia	Aiman Asyraff Bajuri; Malaysia	Kim Jung-been; South Korea
Pursuit	C1–2	Li Zhangyu; China	Liang Guihua; China	Shota Kawamoto; Japan
Pursuit	C3	Jin Yong-sik; South Korea	Saipul Anwar; Indonesia	not awarded
Pursuit	C4	Fadli Immammuddin; Indonesia	Mohd Najib Turano; Malaysia	Gurlal Singh; India
Pursuit	C5	Arthus Bucay; Philippines	Sufyan Saori; Indonesia	Mahdi Mohammadi; Iran
Kilo	C1–2–3	Li Zhangyu; China	Yusof Hafizi Shaharuddin; Malaysia	Shota Kawamoto; Japan
Kilo	C4–5	Wei Guoping; China	Lai Shanzhang; China	Zuhairie Tarmizi; Malaysia
Team sprint	C1–5	China; Li Zhangyu; Wei Guoping; Lai Shanzhang	Malaysia; Yusof Hafizi Shaharuddin; Mohd Najib Turano; Zuhairie Tarmizi	Indonesia; Habib Shaleh; Fadli Immammuddin; Martin Losu

Women

Event	Class	Gold	Silver	Bronze
Pursuit	B	Nur Azlia Syafinaz Zais; Malaysia	Sri Sugiyanti; Indonesia	Nur Syahida Tajudin; Malaysia
Kilo	B	Nur Azlia Syafinaz Zais; Malaysia	Sri Sugiyanti; Indonesia	Nur Syahida Tajudin; Malaysia
Pursuit	C2–5	Keiko Noguchi; Japan	Ruan Jianping; China	Miho Fujii; Japan
500 m	C1–2–3	Li Jieli; China	Keiko Noguchi; Japan	Miho Fujii; Japan
500 m	C4–5	Ruan Jianping; China	not awarded	not awarded

== Medals (2010-2018) ==
Source (NPC Profile):

Rank	Nation	Gold	Silver	Bronze	Total
1	China (CHN)	24	14	12	50
2	South Korea (KOR)	18	11	12	41
3	Japan (JPN)	8	9	4	21
4	Malaysia (MAS)	5	9	7	21
5	Indonesia (INA)	1	8	8	17
6	Philippines (PHI)	1	0	3	4
7	United Arab Emirates (UAE)	0	2	0	2
8	Lebanon (LBN)	0	1	3	4
9	Iran (IRI)	0	0	2	2
10	India (IND)	0	0	1	1
10	Singapore (SGP)	0	0	1	1
Totals (11 entries)		57	54	53	164

== See also ==
- Cycling at the 2017 ASEAN Para Games
- Cycling at the 2018 Asian Games
