= Jin Song-lee =

South Korean Paralympic judoka

Personal information
- Born: 22 April 1987 (age 39)

Sport
- Country: South Korea
- Sport: Paralympic judo
Medal record
Paralympic Games
Bronze medal – third place	2016 Rio de Janeiro	63 kg
Asian Para Games
Gold medal – first place	2018 Jakarta	63 kg

Jin Song-lee (Korean: 진송이; born 22 April 1987) is a South Korean Paralympic judoka. She represented South Korea at the 2016 Summer Paralympics held in Rio de Janeiro, Brazil and she won one of the bronze medals in the women's 63 kg event.

At the 2018 Asian Para Games held in Jakarta, Indonesia, she won the gold medal in the women's 63 kg event.
