= Shooting at the 2016 Summer Paralympics – Women's 10 metre air rifle standing SH1 =

Women's 10 metre air rifle standing SH1 at the XV Paralympic Games
- Venue: Rio Olympic Shooting Centre
- Dates: 8 September 2016
- Competitors: 19 from 11 nations

Medalists
1st place, gold medalist(s)		Veronika Vadovicova	Slovakia
2nd place, silver medalist(s)		Zhang Cuiping	China
3rd place, bronze medalist(s)		Yan Yaping	China

The Women's 10 metre air rifle standing SH1 event at the 2016 Summer Paralympics took place on 8 September at the Olympic Shooting Centre in Rio.

The event consisted of two rounds: a qualifier and a final. In the qualifier, each shooter fired 40 shots with an air rifle at 10 metres distance from the "standing" (interpreted to include seated in wheelchairs) position. Scores for each shot were in increments of 1, with a maximum score of 10.

The top 8 shooters in the qualifying round moved on to the final round. There, they fired an additional 10 shots. These shots scored in increments of .1, with a maximum score of 10.9. The total score from all 50 shots were used to determine the final ranking.

== Qualification round ==
Rank	Athlete	Country	1	2	3	4	Total	Notes
1	Zhang Cuiping	China	103.0	103.8	103.3	103.3	413.4	Q / PR
2	Veronika Vadovicova	Slovakia	103.0	102.8	103.5	103.6	412.9	Q
3	Lee Yunri	South Korea	101.7	103.4	104.7	102.4	412.2	Q
4	Yan Yaping	China	101.5	102.2	103.4	102.6	409.7	Q
5	Bia Xiaohong	China	101.5	102.1	103.1	102.7	409.4	Q
6	Kang Mynug Soon	South Korea	101.5	102.3	102.8	102.7	409.3	Q
7	Natalie Smith	Australia	99.9	102.0	104.0	100.2	406.1	Q
8	Monica Lillehagen	Norway	100.2	101.1	100.0	101.6	402.9	Q
9	Suzan Cevik	Turkey	99.2	100.5	101.2	101.8	402.7	
10	Chutima Saenlar	Thailand	99.0	101.3	99.8	101.9	402.0	
11	Elke Seeliger	Germany	102.6	99.6	99.8	99.6	401.6	
12	Natascha Hiltrop	Germany	99.8	99.1	100.9	100.7	400.5	
13	Cagla Atakal	Turkey	98.5	100.3	99.1	102.3	400.2	
14	Karen Butler	Great Britain	99.6	99.8	99.6	101.2	400.2	
15	Lorraine Lambert	Great Britain	99.1	100.6	98.6	100.8	399.1	
16	Manuela Schmermund	Germany	100.3	101.1	97.4	100.3	399.1	
17	Tammy Delano	United States	95.2	99.7	99.5	102.9	397.3	
18	Elizabeth Kosmala	Australia	98.7	97.7	97.6	102.0	396.0	
19	Lotta Helsinger	Sweden	97.2	98.9	93.4	96.1	385.6	

Q – Qualified for final

== Final ==
Rank	Athlete	Country	1	2	3	4	5	6	7	8	9	Total	Notes
1st place, gold medalist(s)	Veronika Vadovicova	Slovakia	29.9	30.4	21.2	21.2	21.1	21.1	21.0	21.4	20.5	207.8	FPR
2nd place, silver medalist(s)	Zhang Cuiping	China	31.0	31.7	20.2	20.9	20.9	20.0	20.0	20.4	21.2	206.3	
3rd place, bronze medalist(s)	Yan Yaping	China	30.3	29.7	20.4	21.4	20.7	20.7	21.0	19.4		183.6	
4	Lee Yunri	South Korea	31.0	31.0	21.1	20.6	19.6	20.5	20.3			164.1	
5	Natalie Smith	Australia	30.4	31.0	19.2	21.0	19.9	21.0				142.5	
6	Monica Lillehagen	Norway	29.6	30.3	20.6	20.3	18.5					119.3	
7	Bia Xiaohong	China	30.4	28.7	20.3	18.7						98.1	
8	Kang Myung Soon	South Korea	29.2	30.0	20.0							79.2	
