= Cambodia at the 2018 Asian Para Games =

- IPC code: CAM
- NPC: National Paralympic Committee of Cambodia

in Jakarta 6–13 October 2018
- Competitors: 29
- Officials: 14
- Medals: Gold 0 Silver 0 Bronze 0 Total 0

Asian Para Games appearances
- 2010; 2014; 2018; 2022

Cambodia participated at the 2018 Asian Para Games which was held in Jakarta, Indonesia from 6 to 13 October 2018. Cambodia's delegation consisted of 29 athletes, 11 coaches and three advisers and administrators from the Cambodian Ministry of Education, Youth and Sport; larger than the previous two edition of the games.

== See also ==
- Cambodia at the 2018 Asian Games
