= Junko Hirose =

Japanese Paralympic judoka (born 1990)

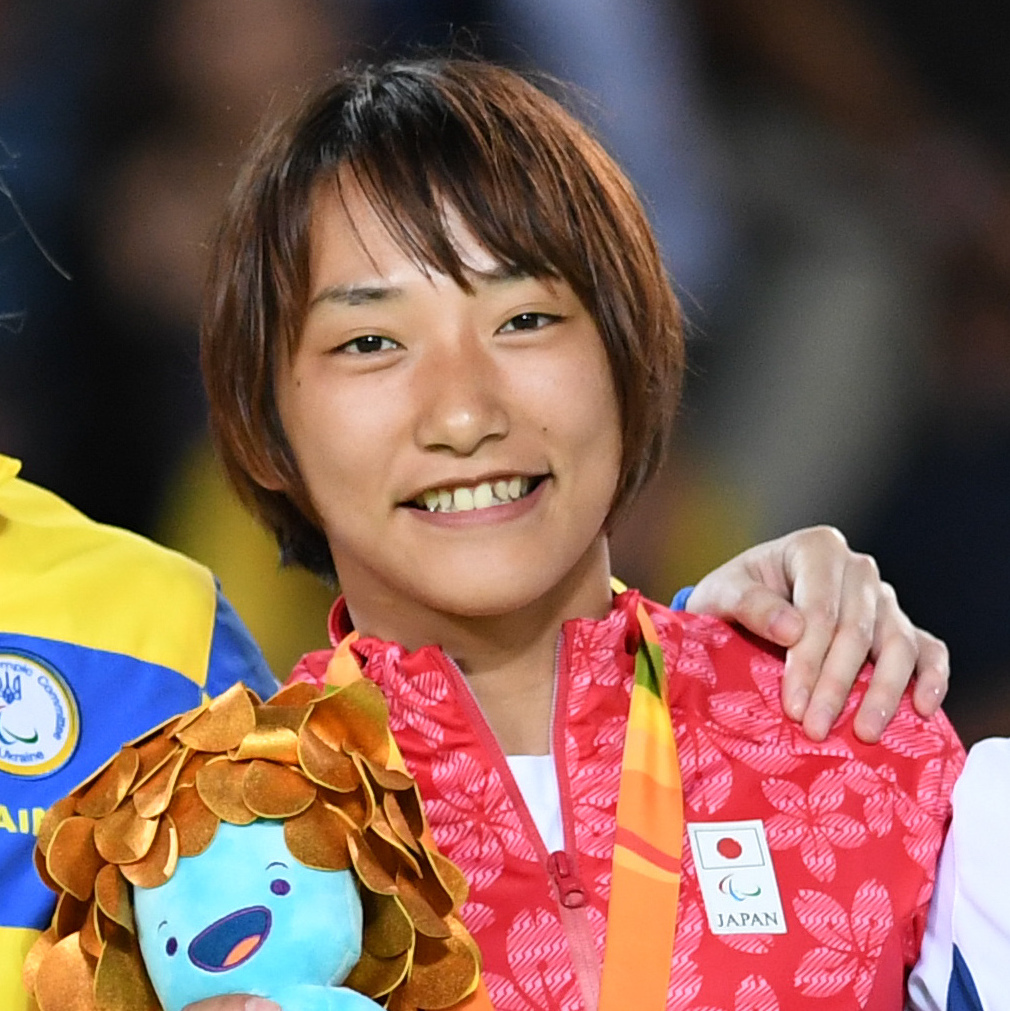
- Hirose at the 2016 Summer Paralympics

Personal information
- Native name: 広瀬 順子
- Born: 12 October 1990 (age 36) Yamaguchi, Yamaguchi

Sport
- Country: Japan
- Sport: Para judo
Medal record
Women's para judo
Representing Japan
Paralympic Games
Gold medal – first place	2024 Paris	57 kg
Bronze medal – third place	2016 Rio de Janeiro	57 kg
Asian Para Games
Gold medal – first place	2022 Hangzhou	57 kg
Bronze medal – third place	2018 Jakarta	Team
Bronze medal – third place	2018 Jakarta	57 kg
Bronze medal – third place	2026 Aichi–Nagoya	60 kg

Junko Hirose (広瀬 順子, Hirose Junko; born 12 October 1990 in Yamaguchi City) is a Japanese Paralympic judoka. She represented Japan at the 2016 Summer Paralympics held in Rio de Janeiro, Brazil and she won one of the bronze medals in the women's 57 kg event.
