= Vahid Nouri =

Iranian Paralympic judoka

Personal information
- Full name: Vahid Nouri
- Nationality: Iranian
- Born: 31 May 1989 (age 37) Tehran, Iran
- Occupation: Judoka
- Height: 189 cm (6 ft 2 in)
- Weight: −90 kg (−198 lb)

Sport
- Country: Iran
- Sport: judo
Medal record
Representing Iran
Paralympic Games
Gold medal – first place	2020 Tokyo	90 kg
Asian Para Games
Gold medal – first place	2018 Jakarta	90 kg
Gold medal – first place	2022 Hangzhou	+90 kg

Profile at external databases
- IJF: 16437
- JudoInside.com: 112372

Vahid Nouri (born 31 May 1989) is an Iranian Paralympic judoka. At the 2020 Summer Paralympics, he won a gold medal in the men's 90 kg event.
