= China at the 2018 Asian Para Games =

- IPC code: CHN
- NPC: National Paralympic Committee of China

in Jakarta 6–13 October 2018
- Competitors: 232 in 15 sports
- Flag bearer: Zou Lihong
- Medals Ranked 1st: Gold 172 Silver 88 Bronze 59 Total 319

Asian Para Games appearances (overview)
- 2010; 2014; 2018; 2022

China participated at the 2018 Asian Para Games in Jakarta, Indonesia from 6 to 13 October 2018. The Chinese team consisted of 232 athletes who competed in 15 out of the 18 sports of the event.

With Hangzhou hosting the 2022 Asian Para Games, a promotional video was shown at the closing ceremony.

== Medal by sport ==
Sport	1st place, gold medalist(s)	2nd place, silver medalist(s)	3rd place, bronze medalist(s)	Total
Athletics	56	32	16	104
Swimming	39	24	12	75
Table tennis	19	6	11	36
Wheelchair fencing	16	5	3	24
Cycling	10	4	1	15
Powerlifting	10	0	0	10
Badminton	7	4	5	16
Archery	6	2	2	10
Shooting	3	5	5	13
Boccia	2	0	0	2
Judo	1	2	4	7
Wheelchair tennis	1	1	0	2
Sitting volleyball	1	1	0	2
Wheelchair basketball	1	0	0	1
Goalball	0	2	0	2
Total	172	88	59	319

== Medals by date ==
Date	1st place, gold medalist(s)	2nd place, silver medalist(s)	3rd place, bronze medalist(s)	Total
6 October	0	0	0	0
7 October	10	5	3	18
8 October	29	10	15	54
9 October	38	20	12	70
10 October	28	17	10	55
11 October	32	17	9	58
12 October	25	15	6	46
13 October	10	4	4	18
Total	172	88	59	319

== See also ==
- China at the 2018 Asian Games
