= Chinese Taipei at the 2018 Asian Para Games =

- IPC code: TPE
- NPC: Chinese Taipei Paralympic Committee

in Jakarta 6–13 October 2018
- Competitors: 89 in 11 sports
- Medals Ranked 17th: Gold 2 Silver 9 Bronze 14 Total 25

Asian Para Games appearances (overview)
- 2010; 2014; 2018; 2022

Chinese Taipei participated at the 2018 Asian Para Games which was held in Jakarta, Indonesia from 6 to 13 October 2018. 89 athletes competed for Chinese Taipei in eleven sports namely: athletics, swimming, powerlifting, shooting, archery, table tennis, judo, wheelchair tennis, badminton, wheelchair basketball and bowling.

== Medalists ==
Medal	Name	Sport	Event	Date
Gold	Lee Chia-chieh	Bowling	Women's Singles TPB8	09 Oct
Gold	Chiu Wen-shen; Huang Yu-hsiao; Shieh Tsung-han	Bowling	Mixed Trios Team TPB1+TPB1/2+TPB2/3	11 Oct
Silver	Chen Liang-da	Swimming	Men's 200m Individual Medley SM7	07 Oct
Silver	Huang Yu-hsiao	Bowling	Men's Singles TPB3	08 Oct
Silver	Cheng Ming-chih	Table tennis	Men's Singles- TT 5	08 Oct
Silver	Lu Pi-chun	Table tennis	Women's Singles- TT 4	08 Oct
Silver	Liu Ya-ting	Athletics	Women's Javelin Throw F12/13	09 Oct
Silver	Tien Shiau-wen	Table tennis	Women's Singles- TT 10	09 Oct
Silver	Chiu Wen-shen; Huang Yu-hsiao	Bowling	Mixed Doubles TPB1+TPB3	10 Oct
Silver	Chen Liang-da	Swimming	Men's 400m Freestyle S7 (6-7)	12 Oct
Silver	Tien Shiau-wen; Lin Tzu-yu	Table tennis	Women's Team- TT 8-10	13 Oct
Bronze	Lee Kai-lin	Judo	Women's 48 kg	08 Oct
Bronze	Lin Yen-hung	Table tennis	Men's Singles- TT 5	08 Oct
Bronze	Huang Tzu-hsuan; Shieh Tsung-han	Bowling	Mixed Doubles TPB2+TPB2	09 Oct
Bronze	Hu Ming-fu	Table tennis	Men's Singles- TT 8	09 Oct
Bronze	Chen Yu-lien	Athletics	Women's 100m T54	10 Oct
Bronze	Lu Tai-an; Yang Meng-chang	Bowling	Mixed Doubles TPB9+TPB9	10 Oct
Bronze	Lin Tzu-hui	Powerlifting	Women's 79 kg	10 Oct
Bronze	Liu Ya-ting	Athletics	Women's Discus Throw F12	11 Oct
Bronze	Huang Chu-yin; Huang Tzu-hsuan	Wheelchair tennis	Quad's Doubles	11 Oct
Bronze	Yang Chuan-hui	Athletics	Men's Long Jump T11	12 Oct
Bronze	Chen Yu-lien	Athletics	Women's 200m T54	12 Oct
Bronze	Wu Cheng-sheng; Yin Chien-ping	Table tennis	Men's Team- TT 3	13 Oct
Bronze	Liang Chen-kun; Lin Wen-hsin	Table tennis	Men's Team- TT 4-5	13 Oct
Bronze	Cheng Ming-chih; Lin Yen-hung	Table tennis	Men's Team- TT 4-5	13 Oct

== Medals by sport ==
Medals by sport
Sport	1st place, gold medalist(s)	2nd place, silver medalist(s)	3rd place, bronze medalist(s)	Total
Athletics	0	1	4	5
Bowling	2	2	2	6
Judo	0	0	1	1
Powerlifting	0	0	1	1
Swimming	0	2	0	2
Table tennis	0	4	5	9
Wheelchair tennis	0	0	1	1
Total	2	9	14	25

== Medals by day ==
Medals by day
Day	Date	1st place, gold medalist(s)	2nd place, silver medalist(s)	3rd place, bronze medalist(s)	Total
1	October 7	0	1	0	1
2	October 8	0	3	2	5
3	October 9	1	2	2	5
4	October 10	0	1	3	4
5	October 11	1	0	2	3
6	October 12	0	1	2	3
7	October 13	0	1	3	4
Total		2	9	14	25

== See also ==
- Chinese Taipei at the 2018 Asian Games
