= Wheelchair basketball at the 2016 Summer Paralympics – Men's team rosters =

This is a list of players that participated in the men's wheelchair basketball competition at the 2016 Summer Paralympics.

== Group A ==
=== Canada ===
The following is the Canada roster in the men's wheelchair basketball tournament of the 2016 Summer Paralympics.

Canada men's national wheelchair basketball team - 2020 Summer Paralympics roster
Players
Coaches

No.	Name	Age – Date of birth	Pts.
4	Nikola Goncin	24 – 19 December 1991	4.5
5	Ben Moronchuk	20 – 29 May 1996	4.5
6	Robert Hedges	36 – 5 January 1980	2.5
7	Peter Won	28 – 19 January 1988	2.5
8	Liam Hickey	18 – 25 March 1998	4.0
9	Adam Lancia	36 – 17 January 1980	4.0
10	Abdi Dini	35 – 1 January 1981	1.0
11	Chad Jassman	32 – 16 September 1983	1.5
12	Patrick Anderson	37 – 22 August 1979	4.5
13	Jonathan Vermette	25 – 4 March 1991	1.0
14	Tyler Miller	37 – 24 June 1984	1.5
15	David Eng	39 – 21 November 1976	4.5

Head coach

Steve Bialowas

Assistant coach(es)

Darrell Nordell

Legend

- Age - describes age on 7 September 2016

=== Netherlands ===
The following is the Netherlands roster in the men's wheelchair basketball tournament of the 2016 Summer Paralympics.

Netherlands men's national wheelchair basketball team - 2016 Summer Paralympics roster
Players
Coaches

No.	Name	Age – Date of birth	Pts.
	Frank de Jong	–
	Anton de Rooij	–
	Sebastiao Nijman	–
	Walter Groen	–
	Mustafa Korkmaz	–
	Marc van de Kuilen	–
	Quinten Zantinge	–
	Robin Poggenwisch	–
	Mendel op den Orth	–
	Mattijs Bellers	–
	Gijs Even	–
	Paul Toes	–

Head coach

Frits Wiegmann

Assistant coach(es)

Mustafa Jebari

== Group B ==
=== Algeria ===
The following is the Algeria roster in the men's wheelchair basketball tournament of the 2016 Summer Paralympics.

Algeria men's national wheelchair basketball team – 2016 Summer Paralympics roster
Players
Coaches

Pos.	No.	Name	Age – Date of birth	Pts.
F	4	Mohamed Reda Bentrat	38 – 7 July 1978
C	5	Faical Cheraitia	35 – 9 August 1981
G	6	Ayoub Badrane	22 – 20 March 1994
F	7	Rafik Mansouri	35 – 7 October 1980
G	8	Mostefa Abassi	38 – 25 September 1977
F	9	Nabil Guedoun	39 – 4 August 1977
G	10	Djamal Hamache	45 – 24 October 1970
C	12	Abdelkarim Megueddem	30 – 4 June 1986
F	13	Abderraouf Abbad	29 – 27 October 1986
G	14	Nouri Ksouri	40 – 30 November 1975
C	15	Bilel Ayache	35 – 2 June 1981

Head coach

- (Algeria) Lahcene Tagmi

Assistant coach(es)

- (Algeria) Mustapha Brahimi

Legend

- Club – describes last club before the tournament
- Age – describes age on 10 September 2016

=== Brazil ===
Brazil men's national basketball team – 2016 Summer Olympics roster
Players
Coaches

Pos.	No.	Name	Age – Date of birth	Pts.	Club	Ctr.
G	4	Gomes dos Santos, Dwan	23 – January 24, 1993	1.0	ADFEGO	(Brazil)
F	5	Vieira, Pedro Henrique	22 – November 27, 1993	4.0	Magic Hands	(Brazil)
F	6	da Silva, Erick	37 – October 5, 1978	3.5	CAD	(Brazil)
F	7	Suursoo, Celestino Luciano	38 – March 10, 1978	4.5	CAD	(Brazil)
C	8	dos Santos, Paulo César	43 – November 18, 1972	2.0	CAD	(Brazil)
F	9	do Bonfim, Edjúnior José	34 – August 30, 1982	4.5	América Tigres	(Brazil)
C	10	Dauinheimer, Paulo Roberto	32 – February 22, 1984	1.5	AFADEFI	(Brazil)
G	11	Arão de Carvalho, Rodrigo	38 – July 7, 1978	1.0	Magic Hands	(Brazil)
G	12	Alves Viana, Amauri	26 – April 13, 1990	1.5	Magic Hands	(Brazil)
F	13	de Miranda, Leandro	34 – August 27, 1982	4.5	GADECAMP	(Brazil)
C	14	Sanchez, Marcos Cândido	34 – July 20, 1982	3.0	GADECAMP	(Brazil)
F	14	da Silva Júnior, Gelson	36 – March 6, 1980	3.0	Magic Hands	(Brazil)

=== Germany ===
- Jan Haller
