= Yan Yaping =

Chinese paralympic sport shooter

Sport
- Country: China
- Sport: Paralympic shooting
Medal record
Representing China
Paralympic Games
Women's shooting para sport
Bronze medal – third place	2016 Rio de Janeiro	Women's 10 metre air rifle standing SH1

Yan Yaping is a Chinese paralympic sport shooter. She participated at the 2016 Summer Paralympics in the shooting competition, being awarded the bronze medal in the women's 10 metre air rifle standing SH1 event.
