= Afghanistan at the 2018 Asian Para Games =

- IPC code: AFG
- NPC: Afghanistan Paralympic Committee

in Jakarta 6–13 October 2018
- Competitors: 24
- Medals: Gold 0 Silver 0 Bronze 0 Total 0

Asian Para Games appearances (overview)
- 2010; 2014; 2018; 2022; 2026

Afghanistan participated at the 2018 Asian Para Games which was held in Jakarta, Indonesia from 6 to 13 October 2018.

== See also ==
- Afghanistan at the 2018 Asian Games
