= Chihiro Kitada =

Japanese wheelchair basketball player

Chihiro Kitada (born 12 January 1989) is a Japanese wheelchair basketball player (4.5 wheelchair basketball classification). She is a member of the Japan women's national wheelchair basketball team and her club Cocktail. In 2021 she competed at the 2020 Summer Paralympics.

== Life ==
Due to polyneuropathy, a progressive illness affecting functions of peripheral nerves, she has impairment of her lower limbs. She started with wheelchair basketball after being introduced by a former player during an internship at a Para sports centre in 2009. She started playing with the men's team Kitakyushu Adachi. She became four times "Most Valuable Player" at the All Japan Championships between 2012 and 2019. With the national team she competed at the 2014 World Championships. After the national team didn't qualify for the 2016 Summer Paralympics, she decided to move to Australia in April 2016. In Australia she played with the Western Stars for two seasons. She returned to Japan in 2018. She won with the Japanese national team the silver medal at the 2018 Asian Para Games in Jakarta. She competed at the 2019 Asia Oceania Championships.

Kitada sustained an wrist injury during the 2020 Empress's Cup.

== Other websites ==
- Chihiro Kitada (JPN), OCTOBER 10, 2015 Basketball IWBF Asia Oceania Championship
- Chihiro Kitada #18 of Team Japan prepares to shoot against Team Australia Photo by Carmen Mandato
