= South Korea at the 2018 Asian Para Games =

- IPC code: KOR
- NPC: Korean Paralympic Committee

in Jakarta 6–13 October 2018
- Competitors: 201
- Medals Ranked 2nd: Gold 54 Silver 45 Bronze 46 Total 145

Asian Para Games appearances (overview)
- 2010; 2014; 2018; 2022

South Korea participated at the 2018 Asian Para Games which was held in Jakarta, Indonesia from 6 to 13 October 2018. The South Korean delegation was led by chef de mission Jun Min-sik, and composed of 307 people, which included 201 athletes. Korean Paralympic Committee (KPC) aims to finish third at the event with 33 gold, 43 silver and 49 bronze medals. South Korea marched along with North Korea under the Korean Unification Flag at the opening ceremony, and have together fielded unified Korean teams in men's table tennis team and the men's swimming freestyle relay and medley relay events.

== Medals by sport ==
Medals by sport
Sport	1st place, gold medalist(s)	2nd place, silver medalist(s)	3rd place, bronze medalist(s)	Total
Archery	0	3	5	8
Athletics	2	3	1	6
Badminton	2	2	5	9
Boccia	1	3	3	7
Bowling	12	7	3	22
Cycling	7	2	1	10
Goalball	0	0	1	1
Judo	8	2	4	14
Lawn bowls	7	1	1	9
Powerlifting	1	1	1	3
Shooting	3	3	5	11
Swimming	1	5	5	11
Table tennis	9	10	5	15
Wheelchair basketball	0	0	1	1
Wheelchair fencing	0	0	5	5
Wheelchair tennis	1	2	0	3
Total	53	45	46	144

== See also ==
- South Korea at the 2018 Asian Games
