= India at the 2018 Asian Para Games =

- IPC code: IND
- NPC: Paralympic Committee of India
- Website: paralympicindia.org.in

in Jakarta 06-13 October 2018
- Competitors: 190 in 13 sports
- Flag bearers: Opening: Mariyappan Thangavelu; Closing
- Medals Ranked 9th: Gold 15 Silver 24 Bronze 33 Total 72

Asian Para Games appearances (overview)
- 2010; 2014; 2018; 2022

India participated at the 2018 Asian Para Games which was held in Jakarta, Indonesia from 6 to 13 October 2018.

== Competitors ==
The Paralympic Committee of India sent its largest ever contingent of 190 athletes for the Games.

Sport	Male	Female	Event
Archery	4	3	6
Badminton	16	2	13
Boccia	2	0	2
Chess	9	8	24
Cycling	4	0	9
Judo	6	5	12
Para Athletics	67	18	74
Para Powerlifting	7	2	8
Para Swimming	11	4	40
Para Shooting	7	3	8
Table Tennis	2	3	5
Tenpin Bowling	3	0	4
Wheelchair Fencing	4	0	6
Total	142	48	211

== Medalists ==
Medal	Name	Sport	Event	Date
Gold	Sandeep Chaudhary	Para Athletics	Men's Javelin Throw F42-44/61-64 Final	8 October
Gold	Suyash Jadhav	Para Swimming	Men's 50M Butterfly S7 (6-7)	8 October
Gold	Raju Rakshita	Para Athletics	Women's 1500M T11	8 October
Gold	Ekta Bhyan	Para Athletics	Women's Club Throw F32/51	9 October
Gold	Manish Narwal	Para Shooting	P1 - Men's 10M Air Pistol - SH1	9 October
Gold	Narayan Thakur	Para Athletics	Men's 100M T35	9 October
Gold	Harvinder Singh	Archery	Men's Individual Recurve Open - W2/ST	10 October
Gold	Sharad Kumar	Para Athletics	Men's High Jump T42/63	11 October
Gold	Parul Parmar	Badminton	Women's Singles SL3	12 October
Gold	Kishan Gangoli	Chess	Men's Individual Rapid VI - B2/B3	12 October
Gold	K. Jennitha Anto	Chess	Women's Individual Rapid P1	12 October
Gold	Neeraj Yadav	Para Athletics	Men's Javelin Throw F55	12 October
Gold	Amit Saroha	Para Athletics	Men's Club Throw F51	12 October
Gold	Tarun Dhillon	Badminton	Men's Singles SL4	13 October
Gold	Pramod Bhagat	Badminton	Men's Singles SL3	13 October
Silver	Farman Basha	Para Powerlifting	Men's Up To 49.00 kg	7 October
Silver	Devanshi Satija	Para Swimming	Women's 100M Butterfly S10	7 October
Silver	Manish Narwal	Para Shooting	P4 - Mixed 50M Free Pistol - SH1	8 October
Silver	Sakina Khatun	Para Powerlifting	Women Up To 50 kg	8 October
Silver	Ramya Nagaranai	Para Athletics	Women's Javelin Throw F46	8 October
Silver	Radha Venkatesh	Para Athletics	Women's 1500M T12/13	8 October
Silver	Pardeep	Para Athletics	Men's Discus Throw F43/44, F62/64	9 October
Silver	Rampal Chahar	Para Athletics	Men's High Jump T45/46/47	9 October
Silver	Virender	Para Athletics	Men's Shot Put F56/57	9 October
Silver	Monu Ghanghas	Para Athletics	Men's Discus Throw F11	10 October
Silver	K. Jennitha Anto	Chess	Women's Individual Standard P1	10 October
Silver	Vijay Kumar	Para Athletics	Men's Long Jump T42/T61/T63	10 October
Silver	Sonalben Patel; Bhavina Patel	Table Tennis	Women's Double- TT 3-5	10 October
Silver	Sundar Singh Gurjar	Para Athletics	Men's Javelin Throw F46	11 October
Silver	Varun Bhati	Para Athletics	Men's High Jump T42/63	11 October
Silver	Anand Gunasekaran	Para Athletics	Men's 400M T44, T62/64	11 October
Silver	Jayanti Behera	Para Athletics	Women's 400M T45/46/47	11 October
Silver	Swapnil Patil	Para Swimming	Men's 100M Backstroke S10	12 October
Silver	Amit Balyan	Para Athletics	Men's Javelin Throw F55	12 October
Silver	Dharambir	Para Athletics	Men's Club Throw F51	12 October
Silver	Mohammed Salih PK; Prachurya Pradhan	Chess	Men's Team Rapid VI - B1	12 October
Silver	Kishan Gangoli; Kanchanbhai Makwana	Chess	Men's Team Rapid VI - B2/B3	12 October
Silver	Mrunali Pande; Megha Chakrobarty	Chess	Women's Team Rapid VI - B2/B3	12 October
Silver	K. Jennitha Anto; Kanishri Raju	Chess	Women's Team Rapid P1	12 October
Bronze	Sukant Kadam; Suhas Lalinakere Yathiraj; Tarun Dhillon; Rakesh Pandey; Chirag Baretha; Raj Kumar	Badminton	Team Standing (SL3-SU5)	7 October
Bronze	Parmjeet Kumar	Para Powerlifting	Men's Up To 49.00 kg	7 October
Bronze	Suyash Jadhav	Para Swimming	Men's 200M Individual Medley SM7	7 October
Bronze	Suyash Jadhav	Para Swimming	Men's 50M Freestyle S7	7 October
Bronze	Singhraj Adhana	Para Shooting	P4 - Mixed 50M Free Pistol - SH1	8 October
Bronze	Devanshi Satija	Para Swimming	Women's 100M Freestyle S10	8 October
Bronze	Swapnil Patil	Para Swimming	Men's 100M Freestyle S10	8 October
Bronze	Deepa Malik	Para Athletics	Women's Javelin Throw F53/54	8 October
Bronze	Monu Ghanghas	Para Athletics	Men's Shot Put F11	9 October
Bronze	Anand Gunasekaran	Para Athletics	Men's 200M T44/T62/64	9 October
Bronze	Jayanti Behera	Para Athletics	Women's 200M T45/46/47	9 October
Bronze	Sundar Singh Gurjar	Para Athletics	Men's Discus Throw F46	9 October
Bronze	Aneesh Kumar Sunderan Pillai	Para Athletics	Men's Discus Throw F43/44, F62/64	9 October
Bronze	Mohd Yasser	Para Athletics	Men's Shot Put F46	10 October
Bronze	Sudhir	Para Powerlifting	Men's Up To 80.00 kg	10 October
Bronze	Mrunali Pande; Megha Chakrobarty	Chess	Women's Team Standard VI - B2/B3	10 October
Bronze	K. Jennitha Anto; Kanishri Raju	Chess	Women's Team Standard P1	10 October
Bronze	Rinku Hooda	Para Athletics	Men's Javelin Throw F46	11 October
Bronze	Avnil Kumar	Para Athletics	Men's 400M T13	11 October
Bronze	Tek Chand	Para Athletics	Men's Shot Put F54/55	11 October
Bronze	Swapnil Patil	Para Swimming	Men's 400M Freestyle S10	11 October
Bronze	Mariyappan Thangavelu	Para Athletics	Men's High Jump T42/63	11 October
Bronze	Radha Venkatesh	Para Athletics	Women's 400M T12	11 October
Bronze	Sandeep Singh Maan	Para Athletics	Men's 400M T45/46/47	11 October
Bronze	Vinay Kumar Lal	Para Athletics	Men's 400M T44, T62/64	11 October
Bronze	Deepa Malik	Para Athletics	Women's Discus Throw F51/52/53	12 October
Bronze	Gurlal Singh	Cycling	Men's C4 Individual Pursuit 4000M	12 October
Bronze	Krishna Nagar	Badminton	Men's Singles SS6	12 October
Bronze	Mansi Joshi	Badminton	Women's Singles SL3	12 October
Bronze	Nidhi Mishra	Para Athletics	Women's Discus Throw F11	12 October
Bronze	Manoj Sarkar	Badminton	Men's Singles SL3	13 October
Bronze	Manoj Sarkar; Pramod Bhagat	Badminton	Men's Doubles SL 3-4	13 October
Bronze	Anand Kumar Bore Gowda; Nitesh Kumar	Badminton	Men's Doubles SL 3-4	13 October

Medals by sport
Sport	gold	silver	bronze	Total
Para Athletics	7	13	16	36
Badminton	3	0	6	9
Chess	2	5	2	9
Para Swimming	1	2	5	8
Para Shooting	1	1	1	3
Archery	1	0	0	1
Para Powerlifting	0	2	2	4
Table Tennis	0	1	0	1
Cycling	0	0	1	1
Total	15	24	33	72

Medals by gender
Gender	1st place, gold medalist(s)	2nd place, silver medalist(s)	3rd place, bronze medalist(s)	Total
Male	11	15	24	50
Female	4	9	9	22
Total	15	24	33	72

Medals by date
Day	Date	Gold medal	Silver medal	Bronze medal	Total
Day 1	6 Oct	0	0	0	0
Day 2	7 Oct	0	2	4	6
Day 3	8 Oct	3	4	4	11
Day 4	9 Oct	3	3	5	11
Day 5	10 Oct	1	4	4	9
Day 6	11 Oct	1	4	8	13
Day 7	12 Oct	5	7	5	17
Day 8	13 Oct	2	0	3	5
Total		15	24	33	72

== Archery ==
=== Recurve ===
Athlete	Event	Ranking round		Round of 32	Round of 16	Quarterfinals	Semifinals	Final / BM	Rank
Athlete	Event	Score	Seed	Opposition Score	Opposition Score	Opposition Score	Opposition Score	Opposition Score	Rank
Harvinder Singh	Men's Individual Open W2/ST	622	4	Leap (CAM); W 6–0	Muhammad (INA); W 6–0	Tseng L-h (TPE); W 7–1	Kim M-s (KOR); W 6–5 (20–19 S-off)	Zhao Lx (CHN); W 6–0	1st place, gold medalist(s)
Sahil Gautam	Men's Individual Open W2/ST	593	13	Muhammad (INA); L 0–6	Did not advance				
Pooja Khanna	Women's Individual Open W2/ST	491	11	—N/a	Jo J-m (KOR); L 2–6	Did not advance			
Pooja Khanna; Harvinder Singh	Mixed Team Open W2/ST	1,113	8	—N/a	Umardyani / Muhammad (INA); W 6–0	Nemati / Rahimi (IRI); L 0–6	Did not advance		

=== Compound ===
Athlete	Event	Ranking round		Round of 32	Round of 16	Quarterfinals	Semifinals	Final / BM	Rank
Athlete	Event	Score	Seed	Opposition Score	Opposition Score	Opposition Score	Opposition Score	Opposition Score	Rank
Rakesh Kumar	Men's Individual Open W2/ST	660	10	Al-Shehhi (UAE); W 137–124	Lee O-s (KOR); L 134–136	Did not advance			
Shyam Sundar Swami	Men's Individual Open W2/ST	667	6	Bye	Muhamad (INA); L 129–132	Did not advance			
Mitali Gaikwad	Women's Individual Open W2/ST	633	8	Bye	Razieh (IRI); L 128–131	Did not advance			
Jyoti Baliyan	Women's Individual Open W2/ST	640	7	Bye	Abbaspour (IRI); W 139–131	Zhou Jm (CHN); L 131–138	Did not advance		
Jyoti Baliyan; Shyam Sundar Swami	Mixed Team Open W2/ST	1307	5	—N/a	Bye	Nagano / Ajima (JPN); L 145–146	Did not advance		

== Badminton ==
=== Men ===
Athlete	Event	Group stage				Round of 16	Quarterfinals	Semifinals	Final	
Athlete	Event	Opposition Score	Opposition Score	Opposition Score	Rank	Opposition Score	Opposition Score	Opposition Score	Opposition Score	Rank
Manoj Sarkar	Singles SL3	Nurjaman (INA); L (17–21, 15–21)	Kim C-m (KOR); W (21–3, 21–10)	—N/a	2 Q	Dwiyoko (INA); W (21–9, 21–17)	Nurjaman (INA); W (19–21, 21–17, 21–18)	Rukaendi (INA); L (18–21, 20–22)	Did not advance	3rd place, bronze medalist(s)
Pramod Bhagat	Singles SL3	Phạm D T (VIE); W (21–11, 21–7)	Joo D-j (KOR); W (21–5, 21–12)	—N/a	1 Q	Bye	Kumar (IND); W (21–9, 21–11)	Trịnh A T (VIE); W (21–17, 18–21, 21–9)	Rukaendi (INA); W (21–19, 15–21, 21–14)	1st place, gold medalist(s)
Umesh Kumar	Singles SL3	Kwong T F (HKG); W (21–12, 21–7)	Trịnh A T (VIE); W (22–20, 16–21, 21–18)	Huang H-c (TPE); W (18–21, 21–13, 21–11)	1 Q	Bye	Bhagat (IND); L (9–21, 11–21)	Did not advance		
Sukant Kadam	Singles SL4	Nguyễn V T (VIE); W (21–12, 21–9)	Gao Yy (CHN); W (23–21, 21–12)	—N/a	1 Q	Bye	Ramdhani (INA); L (19–21, 12–21)	Did not advance		
Suhas Yathiraj	Singles SL4	Ramdhani (INA); W (16–21, 21–11, 21–13)	Norhilmie (MAS); W (21–8, 21–12)	Kittichokwattana (THA); W (21–9, 21–13)	1 Q	Bye	Setiawan (INA); L (12–21, 17–21)	Did not advance		
Tarun Dhillon	Singles SL4	Lee (HKG); W (21–9, 21–14)	Takeyama (JPN); W (21–14, 21–17)	Lin C-c (TPE); W (21–13, 21–14)	1 Q	Bakri (MAS); W (21–13, 21–19)	Teamarrom (THA); W (21–8, 21–13)	Gao Yy (CHN); W (21–16, 21–6)	Setiawan (INA); W (10–21, 21–13, 21–19)	1st place, gold medalist(s)
Krishna Nagar	Singles SS6	Yaemmali (THA); W (21–10, 21–9)	Hatakeyama (JPN); W (21–15, 21–16)	—N/a	1 Q	—N/a	Luo Gl (CHN); W (21–18, 21–10)	Taresoh (MAS); L (16–21, 20–22)	Did not advance	3rd place, bronze medalist(s)
Mark Dharmai	Singles SS6	Hsiung H-y (TPE); W (21–16, 21–19)	Wong C Y (HKG); L (6–21, 10–21)	—N/a	2 Q	—N/a	Chu M K (HKG); L (11–21, 9–21)	Did not advance		
Raja Magotra	Singles SS6	Chen Y-y (TPE); W (21–12, 21–14)	Chu M K (HKG); L (10–21, 10–21)	—N/a	2 Q	—N/a	Wong C Y (HKG); L (19–21, 11–21)	Did not advance		
Rakesh Pandey	Singles SU5	Imai (JPN); L (w/o)	Pu G-y (TPE); L (w/o)	—N/a	3	Did not advance				
Chirag Baretha	Singles SU5	Fang J-y (TPE); L (21–17, 17–21, 20–22)	Trần M N (VIE); W (21–7, 21–15)	Anrimusthi (INA); L (15–21, 14–21)	3	Did not advance				
Raj Kumar	Singles SU5	Wong S Y (HKG); W (16–21, 21–14, 21–15)	Cheah L H (MAS); L (12–21, 8–21)	—N/a	2 Q	Kurnia (INA); L (20–22, 17–21)	Did not advance			
Prem Kumar Ale	Singles WH1	Qu Zm (CHN); L (11–21, 15–21)	Homhaul (THA); L (9–21, 14–21)	Kobayashi (JPN); L (13–21, 17–21)	4	—N/a	Did not advance			
Abu Hubaida	Singles WH2	Andri (INA); L (8–21, 22–20, 15–21)	Chan H Y (HKG); L (12–21, 7–21)	—N/a	3	—N/a	Did not advance			
Anand Gowda; Nitesh Kumar	Doubles SL 3-4	Kwong T F / Lee (HKG); W (21–11, 21–11)	Huzairi / Zulfatihi (MAS); W (21–15, 24–22)	—N/a	2 Q	—N/a	Gao Yy / Wu Fx (CHN); W (21–15, 21–16)	Jeon S-w / Joo D-j (KOR); L (16–21, 11–21)	Did not advance	3rd place, bronze medalist(s)
Manoj Sarkar; Pramod Bhagat	Doubles SL 3-4	Nguyễn V T / Phạm D T (VIE); W (21–16, 21–12)	Jeon S-w / Joo D-j (KOR); W (13–21, 21–19, 21–19)	—N/a	1 Q	—N/a	Huzairi / Zulfatihi (MAS); W (21–16, 21–19)	Dwiyoko / Setiawan (INA); L (13–21, 19–21)	Did not advance	3rd place, bronze medalist(s)
Raj Kumar; Rakesh Pandey	Doubles SU5	Kim G-y / Shin K-h (KOR); W (w/o)	Chu S K / Lam T K (HKG); W (21–14, 21–9)	—N/a	1 Q	—N/a	Faris / Yazid (MAS); L (21–11, 16–21, 20–22)	Did not advance		
Suhas Yathiraj; Chirag Baretha	Doubles SU5	Anrimusthi / Briliansyah (INA); L (11–21, 14–21)	Shogaki / Ura (JPN); W (21–17, 21–19)	Phạm H T / Trần M N (VIE); W (22–20, 21–15)	2 Q	—N/a	Cheah L H / Saaba (MAS); W (21–19, 18–21, 6–21)	Did not advance		
Prem Kumar Ale; Abu Hubaida	Doubles WH 1-2	Junthong / Homhaul (THA); L (15–21, 15–21)	Utomo / Widodo (INA); L (12–21, 23–21, 10–21)	—N/a	3	—N/a	Did not advance			
Suhas Yathiraj; Rakesh Pandey; Tarun Dhillon; Raj Kumar; Chirag Baretha; Sukant Kadam	Team Standing (SL3-SU5)	—N/a				Chinese Taipei (TPE); W 2–0	Japan (JPN); W 2–0	Malaysia (MAS); L 1–2	Did not advance	3rd place, bronze medalist(s)

=== Women ===
Athlete	Event	Group stage				Semifinals	Final	
Athlete	Event	Opposition Score	Opposition Score	Opposition Score	Rank	Opposition Score	Opposition Score	Rank
Parul Parmar	Singles SL3	Ng L L (HKG); W (21–6, 21–3)	Henpraiwan (THA); L (20–22, 19–21)	—N/a	2 Q	Joshi (IND); W (21–13, 21–12)	Kamtam (THA); W (21–9, 21–5)	1st place, gold medalist(s)
Manasi Joshi	Singles SL3	Xiao Zx (CHN); W (21–18, 21–7)	Kamtam (IND); W (21–17, 21–17)	—N/a	1 Q	Parmar (IND); L (13–21, 12–21)	Did not advance	3rd place, bronze medalist(s)
Parul Parmar; Manasi Joshi	Doubles SL3-SU5	Nipada / Srinavakul (THA); L (11–21, 11–21)	Lam T H / Ng L L (HKG); W (21–18, 21–18)	Cheng Hf / Ma Hh (CHN); L (11–21, 13–21)	3	Did not advance		

=== Mixed ===
Athlete	Event	Group stage				Quarterfinals	Semifinals	Final	
Athlete	Event	Opposition Score	Opposition Score	Opposition Score	Rank	Opposition Score	Opposition Score	Opposition Score	Rank
Rakesh Pandey; Parul Parmar	Mixed Doubles SL3-SU5	Ramdhani / Sadiyah (INA); L (19–21, 10–21)	Siripong / Saensupa (THA); L (16–21, 12–21)	Wu Fx / Yang Qx (CHN); L (14–21, 13–21)	4	Did not advance			
Chirag Baretha; Manasi Joshi	Mixed Doubles SL3-SU5	Watcharaphon / Henpraiwan (THA); L (18–21, 8–21)	Suenaga / Sugino (JPN); L (17–21, 12–21)	—N/a	3	Did not advance			

== Boccia ==
=== Men ===
Athlete	Event	Group stage					Quarterfinals	Semifinals	Final	
Athlete	Event	Opposition Score	Opposition Score	Opposition Score	Opposition Score	Rank	Opposition Score	Opposition Score	Opposition Score	Rank
Rahul Dumpa	Individual BC3	Kim H-s (KOR); L 0–20	Binte (INA); L 0–17	Tse T W (HKG); L 0–14	—N/a	4	Did not advance			
Satya Rayala	Individual BC4	Kurnia (HKG); W 5–3	Larpyen (THA); L 0–15	Jang S-y (KOR); L 0–17	Somsanuk (THA); L 1–13	4	Did not advance			

== Chess ==
=== VI - B1 ===
Athlete	Event	Round 1	Round 2	Round 3	Round 4	Round 5	Round 6	Round 7	Total score	Rank
Athlete	Event	Opposition Score	Opposition Score	Opposition Score	Opposition Score	Opposition Score	Opposition Score	Opposition Score	Total score	Rank
Salih Pay Kandiyil	Men's Individual Standard	Roumifard (IRI); L 0–1	Kaung S (MYA); L 0–1	Myo S A (MYA); D 0.5–0.5	Fernandes (TLS); W 1–0	Than H (MYA); W 1–0	Alizadeh (IRI); L 0–1	Mudiyanselage (SRI); W 1–0	3.5	10
Prachurya Pradhan	Men's Individual Standard	Fernandes (TLS); W 1–0	Carsidi (INA); W 1–0	Ching (PHI); D 0.5–0.5	Wirawan (INA); L 0–1	Nguyễn M H (VIE); W 1–0	Suryanto (INA); W 1–0	Kabyzhanov (KAZ); L 0–1	4.5	6
Salih Pay Kandiyil	Men's Individual Rapid	Roumifard (IRI); W 1–0	Suryanto (INA); L 0–1	Bilog (PHI); W 1–0	Wirawan (INA); L 0–1	Than H (MYA); W 1–0	Carsidi (INA); L 0–1	Alizadeh (IRI); D 0.5–0.5	3.5	11
Prachurya Pradhan	Men's Individual Rapid	Fernandes (TLS); W 1–0	Carsidi (INA); L 0–1	Myo S A (MYA); W 1–0	Sarmiento (PHI); W 1–0	Ghadiri (IRI); W 1–0	Suryanto (INA); L 0–1	Kaung S (MYA); W 1–0	5.0	4
Salih Pay Kandiyil; Prachurya Pradhan	Men's Team Standard	—N/a							8.0	5
Salih Pay Kandiyil; Prachurya Pradhan	Men's Team Rapid	—N/a							8.5	2nd place, silver medalist(s)
Himanshi Rathi	Women's Individual Standard	Karhati (INA); D 0.5–0.5	Sinaga (INA); L 0–1	Zadeh (IRI); L 0–1	Ohnmar H (MYA); W 1–0	Phạm T H (VIE); L 0–1	Rad (IRI); L 0–1	Thae S S (MYA); W 1–0	2.5	10
Himanshi Rathi	Women's Individual Rapid	Karhati (INA); L 0–1	Thae S S (MYA); L 0–1	Ohnmar H (MYA); W 1–0	Phạm T H (VIE); W 1–0	Yan P (MYA); W 1–0	Safaei (IRI); L 0–1	Sinaga (INA); W 1–0	4.0	4

=== VI - B2/B3 ===
Athlete	Event	Round 1	Round 2	Round 3	Round 4	Round 5	Round 6	Round 7	Total score	Rank
Athlete	Event	Opposition Score	Opposition Score	Opposition Score	Opposition Score	Opposition Score	Opposition Score	Opposition Score	Total score	Rank
Kishan Gangolli	Men's Individual Standard	Bagheri (IRI); W 1–0	Subaste (PHI); D 0.5–0.5	Karimi (IRI); D 0.5–0.5	Satrio (INA); L 0–1	Ghoorchi (IRI); W 1–0	Redor (PHI); L 0–1	S Pradhan (IND); W 1–0	4.0	6
Ashwin Makwana	Men's Individual Standard	Karimi (IRI); L 0–1	Haryanto (INA); W 1–0	Redor (PHI); L 0–1	Ghoorchi (IRI); W 1–0	Bagheri (IRI); W 1–0	Subaste (PHI); W 1–0	Satrio (INA); L 0–1	4.0	8
Soundarya Pradhan	Men's Individual Standard	Maklushov (KAZ); L 0–1	Hartono (INA); L 0–1	Haryanto (INA); W 1–0	Peligro (PHI); D 0.5–0.5	Cassim (SRI); W 1–0	Bagheri (IRI); L 0–1	Gangolli (IND); L 0–1	2.5	12
Kishan Gangolli	Men's Individual Rapid	Makwana (IND); D 0.5–0.5	Haryanto (INA); W 1–0	Subaste (PHI); W 1–0	Hartono (INA); W 1–0	Satrio (INA); D 0.5–0.5	Redor (PHI); D 0.5–0.5	Bagheri (IRI); W 1–0	5.5	1st place, gold medalist(s)
Ashwin Makwana	Men's Individual Rapid	Gangolli (IND); D 0.5–0.5	Hartono (INA); W 1–0	Ghoorchi (IRI); D 0.5–0.5	Peligro (PHI); W 1–0	Maklushov (KAZ); L 0–1	—N/a	Haryanto (INA); W 1–0	4.0	6
Soundarya Pradhan	Men's Individual Rapid	Satrio (INA); L 0–1	Cassim (SRI); W 1–0	Maklushov (KAZ); W 1–0	Bagheri (IRI); L 0–1	Redor (PHI); L 0–1	Peligro (PHI); W 1–0	—N/a	3.0	10
Kishan Gangolli; Ashwin Makwana	Men's Team Standard	—N/a							8.0	4
Kishan Gangolli; Ashwin Makwana	Men's Team Rapid	—N/a							9.5	2nd place, silver medalist(s)
Megha Chakraborty	Women's Individual Standard	Khairunnisa (INA); D 0.5–0.5	Puspita (INA); L 0–1	Gawar (IND); W 1–0	Zendeh (IRI); L 0–1	Pande (IND); D 0.5–0.5	Zakaria (MAS); W 1–0	—N/a	4.0	8
Punaram Gawar	Women's Individual Standard	Naghavi (IRI); L 0–1	Shoberi (MAS); L 0–1	Chakraborty (IND); L 0–1	—N/a	Zakaria (MAS); L 0–1	Khairunnisa (INA); L 0–1	Nguyễn T H C (VIE); D 0.5–0.5	1.5	15
Mrunali Pande	Women's Individual Standard	Zendeh (IRI); L 0–1	Zakaria (MAS); W 1–0	Wijayanti (INA); W 1–0	Halil (MAS); L 0–1	Chakraborty (IND); D 0.5–0.5	Shoberi (MAS); W 1–0	Naghavi (IRI); D 0.5–0.5	4.0	7
Megha Chakraborty	Women's Individual Rapid	Khairunnisa (INA); W 1–0	Nguyễn T M T (VIE); D 0.5–0.5	Zendeh (IRI); W 1–0	Nguyễn T M L (VIE); W 1–0	Halil (MAS); L 0–1	Wijayanti (INA); L 0–1	Nguyễn T H C (VIE); W 1–0	4.5	6
Punaram Gawar	Women's Individual Rapid	Barghoul (IRI); L 0–1	Shoberi (MAS); W 1–0	Pande (IND); D 0.5–0.5	Zakaria (MAS); W 1–0	Nguyễn T H C (VIE); L 0–1	Khairunnisa (INA); L 0–1	—N/a	3.5	10
Mrunali Pande	Women's Individual Rapid	Nguyễn T H C (VIE); L 0–1	—N/a	Gawar (IND); D 0.5–0.5	Zendeh (IRI); L 0–1	Zakaria (MAS); W 1–0	Nguyễn T M T (VIE); W 1–0	Halil (MAS); W 1–0	4.5	7
Megha Chakraborty; Mrunali Pande	Women's Team Standard	—N/a							8.0	3rd place, bronze medalist(s)
Megha Chakraborty; Mrunali Pande	Women's Team Rapid	—N/a							9.0	2nd place, silver medalist(s)

=== P1 ===
Athlete	Event	Round 1	Round 2	Round 3	Round 4	Round 5	Round 6	Round 7	Total score	Rank
Athlete	Event	Opposition Score	Opposition Score	Opposition Score	Opposition Score	Opposition Score	Opposition Score	Opposition Score	Total score	Rank
Naveen Arigala	Men's Individual Standard	Rom (PHI); L 0–1	Venkata (IND); L 0–1	—N/a	Lopes (TLS); W 1–0	Sinaga (INA); L 0–1	Kutwal (IND); L 0–1	Sutikno (INA); W 1–0	3.0	9
Shashikant Kutwal	Men's Individual Standard	Sutikno (INA); W 1–0	Soltanov (KAZ); W 1–0	Severino (PHI); L 0–1	Venkata (IND); D 0.5–0.5	Firdaus (INA); L 0–1	Arigala (IND); W 1–0	López (PHI); L 0–1	3.5	7
Krishna Venkata	Men's Individual Standard	Firdaus (INA); L 0–1	Arigala (IND); W 1–0	Lopes (TLS); W 1–0	Kutwal (IND); D 0.5–0.5	Rom (PHI); L 0–1	—N/a	Severino (PHI); D 0.5–0.5	4.0	6
Naveen Arigala	Men's Individual Rapid	Firdaus (INA); W 1–0	López (PHI); L 0–1	Soltanov (KAZ); L 0–1	Kutwal (IND); L 0–1	—N/a	Sinaga (INA); L 0–1	Lopes (TLS); W 1–0	3.0	10
Shashikant Kutwal	Men's Individual Rapid	López (PHI); L 0–1	Firdaus (INA); L 0–1	—N/a	Arigala (IND); W 1–0	Venkata (IND); W 1–0	Severino (PHI); D 0.5–0.5	Rom (PHI); L 0–1	3.5	6
Krishna Venkata	Men's Individual Rapid	Soltanov (KAZ); W 1–0	Severino (PHI); L 0–1	López (PHI); L 0–1	Lopes (TLS); W 1–0	Kutwal (IND); L 0–1	—N/a	Sinaga (INA); W 1–0	4.0	5
Shashikant Kutwal; Krishna Venkata	Men's Team Standard	—N/a							7.5	3
Shashikant Kutwal; Krishna Venkata	Men's Team Rapid	—N/a							7.5	3
Jennitha Anto	Women's Individual Standard	Angot (PHI); W 1–0	Farta (INA); L 0–1	Yuni (INA); W 1–0	Nguyễn T K (VIE); W 1–0	Trần T B T (VIE); D 0.5–0.5	Đoàn T H (VIE); W 1–0	Manurung (INA); D 0.5–0.5	5.5	2nd place, silver medalist(s)
Prema Raju	Women's Individual Standard	—N/a	Đoàn T H (VIE); L 0–1	Angot (PHI); D 0.5–0.5	Manurung (INA); L 0–1	Nguyễn T K (VIE); D 0.5–0.5	Mangayayam (PHI); L 0–1	Nacita (PHI); L 0–1	2.0	11
Jennitha Anto	Women's Individual Rapid	Angot (PHI); W 1–0	Farta (INA); W 1–0	Đoàn T H (VIE); D 0.5–0.5	Nguyễn T K (VIE); W 1–0	Trần T B T (VIE); W 1–0	Yuni (INA); D 0.5–0.5	Manurung (INA); W 1–0	6.0	1st place, gold medalist(s)
Prema Raju	Women's Individual Rapid	—N/a	Đoàn T H (VIE); L 0–1	Nguyễn T K (VIE); L 0–1	Farta (INA); L 0–1	Mangayayam (PHI); W 1–0	Angot (PHI); W 1–0	Nacita (PHI); L 0–1	3.0	9
Jennitha Anto; Prema Raju	Women's Team Standard	—N/a							5.5	3rd place, bronze medalist(s)
Jennitha Anto; Prema Raju	Women's Team Rapid	—N/a							9.0	2nd place, silver medalist(s)

== Cycling ==
Men

Athlete	Event	Qualifying round		Final	
Athlete	Event	Timing	Rank	Timing	Rank
Kaigou Lal	Time Trial (C3)	—N/a		19:47.129	3
Kaigou Lal	C3 Individual Pursuit 3000M	5:06.178	3	Did not advance	
Kaigou Lal	C1-2-3 Kilo	—N/a		1:36.872	10
Divij Shah	Time Trial (C5)	—N/a		30:39.526	4
Divij Shah	Road Race (C5)	—N/a		2:19:00.676	8
Gurlal Singh	Time Trial (C4)	—N/a		31:34.346	6
Harinder Singh	Time Trial (C4)	—N/a		31:22.893	5
Gurlal Singh	Road Race (C4)	—N/a		2:11:45.130	5
Harinder Singh	Road Race (C4)	—N/a		2:11:47.780	6
Gurlal Singh	C4 Individual Pursuit 4000M	6:00.878	3	6:00.264	3rd place, bronze medalist(s)
Harinder Singh	C4 Individual Pursuit 4000M	6:13.257	4	6:05.523	4
Gurlal Singh	C4-5 Kilo	—N/a		1:25.409	10
Harinder Singh	C4-5 Kilo	—N/a		1:24.855	9

== Judo ==
=== Men ===
Athlete	Event	Round of 16	Quarterfinal	Semifinal	Repechage	Final / BM	
Athlete	Event	Opposition Result	Opposition Result	Opposition Result	Opposition Result	Opposition Result	Rank
Karmpal	60 kg	Sherpa (NEP); W 10–0	Lee M-j (KOR); L 0s1–10	Did not advance	Abdulrahman (IRQ); W 110s1–0s2	Abadi (IRI); L 0s2–10s1	5
Jaydeep Singh	66 kg	Bye	Fujimoto (JPN); L 0–10	Did not advance	Ma Jx (CHN); L 0s1–1	Did not advance	
Manoharan Janakiraman	73 kg	Enkhtuya (MGL); L 0–10	Did not advance				
Monu	73 kg	Abbasnejad (IRI); L 0–10	Did not advance				
Sunil Kumar	81 kg	Dharma (INA); W 10–0	Kitazono (JPN); L 0s1–10	Did not advance	Chaisin (THA); W 10–0	Jafari (IRI); L 0s1–10	5
Bijender	90 kg+	Bye	Li Yc (CHN); L 0s1–11	Did not advance	Lkhagvadorj (MGL); W 10–1	Demchigdorj (MGL); L 0s1–10	5
Karmpal; Jaydeep Singh; Monu; Sunil Kumar; Bijender	Team	—N/a	Japan (JPN); L 1–4	Did not advance	Uzbekistan (UZB); L 0–5	Did not advance	

=== Women ===
Knockout format

Athlete	Event	Round of 16	Quarterfinal	Semifinal	Repechage	Final / BM	
Athlete	Event	Opposition Result	Opposition Result	Opposition Result	Opposition Result	Opposition Result	Rank
Janki Bai	48 kg	Bye	Choi S-h (KOR); L 0–11	Did not advance	Thongsri (THA); L 0–10	Did not advance	
Kusum	52 kg	Bye	Salaeva (UZB); L 0–10	Did not advance	Norkaew (THA); W 10–0	Li Yq (CHN); L 0–10	5
Poonam Sharma	57 kg	—N/a	Sheripboeva (UZB); L 0–10	Did not advance	Khwaengmueang (THA); L 0–10	Did not advance	
Murugan Mageswari	70 kg+	—N/a	Tampobolon (INA); L 0s1–11	Did not advance	—N/a	Yusupova (UZB); L 0–10s1	5
Kusum; Poonam Sharma; Susheela Mani	Team	—N/a	China (CHN); L 0–3	Did not advance	Thailand (THA); L 1–2	Did not advance	

Round Robin format

Athlete	Event	Group stage				Rank
Athlete	Event	Opposition Result	Opposition Result	Opposition Result	Opposition Result	Rank
Susheela Mani	70 kg	Zhou Qa (CHN); L 0–10	Nishimura (JPN); L 0–10	Lee G-e (KOR); L 0–10	Aliboeva (UZB); L 0–10	5

== Para Athletics ==
=== Men ===
==== Track ====
Athlete	Event	Heat		Final	
Athlete	Event	Time	Rank	Time	Rank
Ramanjee	100 m T11	12.32 PB	2 q	12.25 PB	4
Ramanjee	200 m T11	27.49	4	Did not advance	
Sumit Kumar	200 m T11	26.09	4	Did not advance	
Shavaad Jedikere	200 m T11	25.97	3	Did not advance	
Shavaad Jedikere	400 m T11	1:01.17	2	Did not advance	
Sumit Kumar	1500 m T11	—N/a		4:46.04	6
K. G. Keshavmurthy	1500 m T11	—N/a		DQ	
Ankur Dhama	1500 m T11	—N/a		4:34.14	4
Ankur Dhama	5000 m T11	—N/a		DNF	
M.K. Sharath	1500 m T12/13	—N/a		4:23.49 PB	8
Ramkaran Singh	1500 m T12/13	—N/a		4:16.60 SB	6
Ramkaran Singh	5000 m T12/13	—N/a		16:20.37	4
Avnil Kumar	100 m T13	—N/a		11.61	4
Avnil Kumar	200 m T13	23.77	2 Q	23.60	4
Avnil Kumar	400 m T13	—N/a		52.00	3rd place, bronze medalist(s)
Narayan Thakur	100 m T35	—N/a		14.02 GR	1st place, gold medalist(s)
Narayan Thakur	200 m T37	30.41	6	Did not advance	
Raman Sharma	400 m T37	59.18	5 q	59.36	6
Vasramji Thakor	200 m T42/63	—N/a		29.08	7
Anand Gunasekaran	100 m T44/T62/64	12.01 PB	2 Q	12.10	8
Someswara Rao	100 m T44/T62/64	12.25	4	Did not advance	
Manoj Basker	100 m T44/T62/64	12.35	3	Did not advance	
Manoj Basker	200 m T44/T62/64	24.74	3 Q	25.85	8
Prashant Desai	200 m T44/T62/64	25.57	4	Did not advance	
Anand Gunasekaran	200 m T44/T62/64	24.23	1 Q	24.45	3rd place, bronze medalist(s)
Anand Gunasekaran	400 m T44/T62/64	56.51	1 Q	53.72 GR	2nd place, silver medalist(s)
Someswara Rao	400 m T44/T62/64	56.86	1 Q	54.63	4
Vinay Kumar Lal	400 m T44/T62/64	56.98	3 Q	54.45 PB	3rd place, bronze medalist(s)
Sandeep Singh Maan	100 m T45/46/47	11.94	5	Did not advance	
Sandeep Singh Maan	200 m T45/46/47	23.62	5 q	23.20 SB	7
Mithan	200 m T45/46/47	23.63	3	Did not advance	
Aamit Kumar	200 m T45/46/47	23.66	3	Did not advance	
Aamit Kumar	400 m T45/46/47	DQ		Did not advance	
Sandeep Singh Maan	400 m T45/46/47	51.64	1 Q	50.07 SB	3rd place, bronze medalist(s)
Mithan	400 m T45/46/47	50.15	1 Q	50.17	5
Vishal Kumar	1500 m T45/46	—N/a		4:44.28	6

==== Field ====
Athlete	Events	Result	Rank
Sonu Singh	Discus Throw F11	25.97	10
Monu Ghangas	Discus Throw F11	35.89	2nd place, silver medalist(s)
Monu Ghangas	Shot Put F11	11.38 PB	3rd place, bronze medalist(s)
Sonu Singh	Shot Put F11	7.77	12
Ramanjee	Long Jump T11	4.01	7
Ashish Negi	Discus Throw F12	30.25 PB	5
Ashish Negi	Shot Put F12	11.07 PB	4
Devershee Sachan	Javelin Throw F33/34	10.01	10
Devershee Sachan	Shot Put F33	6.59	7
Manoj Singaraja	Shot Put F41	8.29	8
Rokkadar Thippeswamy	Javelin Throw F42-44/61-64	45.32	8
Sandeep Chaudhary	Javelin Throw F42-44/61-64	60.01 WR	1st place, gold medalist(s)
Sumit Antil	Javelin Throw F42-44/61-64	56.29	5
Devendra Jhajharia	Javelin Throw F46	59.17 SB	4
Rinku Hooda	Javelin Throw F46	60.92 PB	3rd place, bronze medalist(s)
Sundar Singh Gurjar	Javelin Throw F46	61.33	2nd place, silver medalist(s)
Sundar Singh Gurjar	Discus Throw F46	47.10 PB	3rd place, bronze medalist(s)
Rohit Kumar	Discus Throw F46	46.21 PB	
Mohd Yasser	Discus Throw F46	38.13	8
Mohd Yasser	Shot Put F46	14.22	3rd place, bronze medalist(s)
Rohit Kumar	Shot Put F46	12.93	5
Amit Saroha	Club Throw F51	29.47 AS	1st place, gold medalist(s)
Pydiramu Kottini	Club Throw F51	18.21	5
Dharambir	Club Throw F51	24.81	2nd place, silver medalist(s)
Dharambir	Discus Throw F51/52/53	9.23 PB	5
Pydiramu Kottini	Discus Throw F51/52/53	8.68	7
Amit Kumar	Discus Throw F51/52/53	10.45	4
Manjeet Ahlawat	Discus Throw F51/52/53	8.65	10
Manjeet Ahlawat	Shot Put F53	5.30 PB	4
Manjeet Ahlawat	Javelin Throw F53/54	10.15	10
Tek Chand	Javelin Throw F53/54	22.80 PB	5
Tek Chand	Shot Put F54/55	8.85 PB	3rd place, bronze medalist(s)
P. Raghavendra	Shot Put F54/55	8.24	9
Anil Kumar	Shot Put F54/55	6.83	18
Neeraj Yadav	Shot Put F54/55	9.09	7
Neeraj Yadav	Javelin Throw F55	29.84 GR	1st place, gold medalist(s)
Amit Balyan	Javelin Throw F55	29.79 PB	2nd place, silver medalist(s)
Sunil Phogat	Javelin Throw F55	26.52	6
Anil Kumar	Discus Throw F54/55/56	21.14	20
Neeraj Yadav	Discus Throw F54/55/56	30.30	8
P. Raghavendra	Discus Throw F54/55/56	31.75	6
Yogesh Kathuniya	Discus Throw F54/55/56	36.23	4
Aneesh Pillai	Discus Throw F43/44, F62/64	45.41 PB	3rd place, bronze medalist(s)
Jagminder	Discus Throw F43/44, F62/64	42.67 PB	4
Pardeep	Discus Throw F43/44, F62/64	46.64	2nd place, silver medalist(s)
Pardeep	Long Jump T44, T62/64	6.01 PB	4
Rishu Prajapati	Long Jump T44, T62/64	NM	NR
Manoj Basker	Long Jump T44, T62/64	5.08	10
Sandeep	Discus Throw F57	39.53	5
Thirumalai Kumar Subbaiah	Discus Throw F57	30.21	13
Bhagat Singh	Discus Throw F57	35.50	9
Bhagat Singh	Shot Put F56/57	10.91	9
Sujith Kuniya	Shot Put F56/57	11.59	6
Virender	Shot Put F56/57	14.23 PB	2nd place, silver medalist(s)
Arvind	Shot Put F35	11.87	5
Varun Bhati	High Jump T42/63	1.82 SB	2nd place, silver medalist(s)
Mariyappan Thangavelu	High Jump T42/63	1.67	3rd place, bronze medalist(s)
Sharad Kumar	High Jump T42/63	1.90 AR	1st place, gold medalist(s)
Ram Pal	High Jump T45/46/47	1.94 PB	2nd place, silver medalist(s)
Vikas Dagar	Long Jump T36	4.38 PB	5
Sombir	Long Jump T36	4.38 SB	6
H. N. Girisha	Long Jump T42/T61/T63	3.76	6
Vijay Kumar	Long Jump T42/T61/T63	5.05 PB	2nd place, silver medalist(s)

=== Women ===
==== Track ====
Athlete	Event	Heat		Final	
Athlete	Event	Time	Rank	Time	Rank
Nidhi Mishra	100 m T11	15.52 PB	4	Did not advance	
Rakshita Raju	400 m T11	1:13.34 PB	2	Did not advance	
Rakshita Raju	1500 m T11	—N/a		5:40.64	1st place, gold medalist(s)
Radha Venkatesh	400 m T12	—N/a		1:07.03 PB	3rd place, bronze medalist(s)
Radha Venkatesh	1500 m T12/13	—N/a		5:17.65	2nd place, silver medalist(s)
Jayanti Behera	100 m T45/46/47	13.76	2 Q	13.55 SB	5
Jayanti Behera	200 m T45/46/47	27.71	2 Q	27.45 PB	3rd place, bronze medalist(s)
Jayanti Behera	400 m T45/46/47	—N/a		59.71	2nd place, silver medalist(s)

==== Field ====
Athlete	Event	Score	Rank
Sivagami Ganthi	Shot Put F11/12	5.17	12
Nidhi Mishra	Shot Put F11/12	5.58	11
Nidhi Mishra	Discus Throw F11	21.82 PB	3rd place, bronze medalist(s)
Suman	Discus Throw F43/44, F62/64	25.00 PB	4
Suman	Shot Put F43/44, F62/64	7.82 PB	5
Ramya Nagaranai	Javelin Throw F46	31.51	2nd place, silver medalist(s)
Reena Rani	Javelin Throw F46	22.48	6
Suvarna Raj	Javelin Throw F57	7.35	10
Suvarna Raj	Shot Put F56/57	3.81	9
Gauriben Patel	Javelin Throw F55/56	11.45	10
Shweta Sharma	Javelin Throw F55/56	11.97 PB	9
Shweta Sharma	Shot Put F55	5.59 PB	10
Shatabdi Awasthi	Shot Put F55	5.29	11
Karam Jyoti	Shot Put F55	5.99 PB	7
Karam Jyoti	Discus Throw F54/55	18.76	5
Archana Kumari	Discus Throw F54/55	11.94	9
Archana Kumari	Shot Put F54	4.14 PB	9
Indu Rana	Shot Put F54	3.99 PB	10
Indu Rana	Javelin Throw F53/54	7.92	13
Archana Kumari	Javelin Throw F53/54	8.95	10
Deepa Malik	Javelin Throw F53/54	10.15	3rd place, bronze medalist(s)
Deepa Malik	Discus Throw F51/52/53	9.67 PB	3rd place, bronze medalist(s)
Ekta Bhyan	Discus Throw F51/52/53	6.52 AR	4
Ekta Bhyan	Club Throw F32/51	16.02 GR	1st place, gold medalist(s)

== Para Powerlifting ==
=== Men ===
Athlete	Event	Attempt 1	Attempt 2	Attempt 3	Total	Rank
Farman Basha	Up to 49 kg	127	128	~~133~~	128	2nd place, silver medalist(s)
Parmjeet Kumar	Up to 49 kg	110	120	127	127	3rd place, bronze medalist(s)
Ashok Malik	Up to 59 kg	DNF			NM	Not Ranked
Jaideep Deswal	Up to 65 kg	185	~~188~~	~~191~~	185	4
Rajinder Singh Rahelu	Up to 72 kg	156	~~166~~	~~166~~	156	7
Sudhir	Up to 80 kg	182	187	192	192	3rd place, bronze medalist(s)
Sachin Chaudhary	Up to 88 kg	181	~~185~~	~~185~~	181	6

=== Women ===
Athlete	Event	Attempt 1	Attempt 2	Attempt 3	Total	Rank
Manpreet Kaur	Up To 41 kg	73	75	~~77~~	75	4
Sakina Khatun	Up To 50 kg	84	~~87~~	~~88~~	84	2nd place, silver medalist(s)

== Para Swimming ==
=== Men ===
Athlete	Event	Heats		Final	
Athlete	Event	Time	Rank	Time	Rank
Jigar Thakker	100 m Freestyle S4 (1-4)	2:50.91	4	Did not advance	
Justin Jesudas	100 m Freestyle S4 (1-4)	1:58.61	2 Q	2:52.44	7
Justin Jesudas	50 m Freestyle S4 (1-4)	1:27.23	4 Q	1:21.37	7
Justin Jesudas	200 m Freestyle S4 (1-4)	—N/a		5:51.59	6
Justin Jesudas	50 m Backstroke S4 (1-4)	1:21.29	4 Q	1:21.07	6
Jigar Thakker	50 m Backstroke S4 (1-4)	1:15.91	2 Q	1:17.64	5
Jigar Thakker	50 m Breaststroke SB3 (1-3)	—N/a		2:34.06	4
Jigar Thakker	50 m Freestyle S5	53.32	6	Did not advance	
Shams Aalam	50 m Freestyle S5	53.97	7	Did not advance	
Shams Aalam	100 m Freestyle S5	1:56.67	3 Q	1:55.59	8
Shams Aalam	50 m Butterfly S5 (2-5)	49.87	3 Q	50.52	5
Jigar Thakker	50 m Butterfly S5 (2-5)	1:19.37	5	Did not advance	
Jigar Thakker	200 m Freestyle S5	5:14.73	3 Q	5:03.22	8
Shams Aalam	200 m Freestyle S5	4:14.63	5 Q	4:20.47	7
Shams Aalam	100 m Breaststroke SB4	—N/a		2:40.13	4
Shams Aalam	200 m Individual Medley SM6 (5-6)	4:40.44	4 Q	4:43.63	6
Suyash Jadhav	100 m Freestyle S7	1:21.76	5	Did not advance	
Suyash Jadhav	50 m Butterfly S7 (6-7)	37.46	2 Q	32.71	1st place, gold medalist(s)
Suyash Jadhav	50 m Freestyle S7	32.83	1 Q	32.16	3rd place, bronze medalist(s)
Niranjan Mukundan	50 m Freestyle S7	34.29	3 Q	34.63	7
Niranjan Mukundan	400 m Freestyle S7 (6-7)	5:32.48	3 Q	5:30.51	4
Niranjan Mukundan	200 m Individual Medley SM7	—N/a		2:59.58	4
Suyash Jadhav	200 m Individual Medley SM7	—N/a		2:56.51	3rd place, bronze medalist(s)
Abhishek Jadhav	100 m Breaststroke SB7	—N/a		2:08.12	6
Abhishek Jadhav	50 m Freestyle S8	39.33	6	Did not advance	
Punith Nandkumar	50 m Freestyle S8	32.44	5	Did not advance	
Shridhar Malagi	50 m Freestyle S8	31.27	4	Did not advance	
Shridhar Malagi	100 m Freestyle S8	1:10.46	4 q	1:21.21	7
Punith Nandkumar	100 m Freestyle S8	1:12.94	4	Did not advance	
Abhishek Jadhav	100 m Freestyle S8	1:24.32	7	Did not advance	
Abhishek Jadhav	100 m Backstroke S8	1:42.37	5	Did not advance	
Punith Nandkumar	100 m Backstroke S8	1:38.22	5	Did not advance	
Sharath Gayakwad	100 m Backstroke S8	1:26.83	3 Q	1:18.86	4
Sharath Gayakwad	100 m Breaststroke SB8	1:24.68	4 Q	1:23.36	6
Shridhar Malagi	100 m Breaststroke SB8	1:35.37	4 Q	1:33.80	7
Shridhar Malagi	100 m Butterfly S8	1:28.76	6	Did not advance	
Punith Nandkumar	100 m Butterfly S8	1:16.28	3 Q	1:13.83	5
Punith Nandkumar	200 m Individual Medley SM8	2:59.85	3 Q	3:03.10	4
Abhishek Jadhav	200 m Individual Medley SM8	DNF		Did not advance	
Shridhar Malagi	200 m Individual Medley SM8	DNF		Did not advance	
Shridhar Malagi	400 m Freestyle S8	—N/a		5:23.29	5
Punith Nandkumar	400 m Freestyle S8	—N/a		5:40.11	6
Swapnil Patil	50 m Freestyle S10	—N/a		26.92	4
Chetan Raut	50 m Freestyle S10	—N/a		29.22	6
Chetan Raut	100 m Freestyle S10	—N/a		1:06.38	5
Swapnil Patil	100 m Freestyle S10	—N/a		59.77	3rd place, bronze medalist(s)
Swapnil Patil	100 m Backstroke S10	—N/a		1:09.35	2nd place, silver medalist(s)
Chetan Raut	100 m Backstroke S10	—N/a		1:20.49	5
Chetan Raut	100 m Breaststroke SB9	—N/a		1:30.53	4
Chetan Raut	100 m Butterfly S10	—N/a		1:08.36	4
Chetan Raut	200 m Individual Medley SM10	—N/a		2:50.94	4
Chetan Raut	400 m Freestyle S10	—N/a		5:12.48	7
Swapnil Patil	400 m Freestyle S10	—N/a		4:41.45	3rd place, bronze medalist(s)
India	4X100 m Medley Relay 34 Points	—N/a		5:01.88	4

=== Women ===
Athlete	Event	Heats		Final	
Athlete	Event	Time	Rank	Time	Rank
Sathi Mondal	100 m Freestyle S6	—N/a		1:58.04	8
Sathi Mondal	400 m Freestyle S7 (6-7)	8:58.51	5	Did not advance	
Sathi Mondal	100 m Backstroke S8 (6-8)	2:29.40	6	Did not advance	
Sathi Mondal	200 m Individual Medley SM9 (5-9)	DNF		Did not advance	
Kanchalmala Pande	100 m Freestyle S11	—N/a		1:34.74	6
Kanchalmala Pande	100 m Breaststroke SB13 (11-13)	1:56.69	5	Did not advance	
Devanshi Satija	100 m Freestyle S10	—N/a		1:14.37	3rd place, bronze medalist(s)
Devanshi Satija	100 m Butterfly S10	—N/a		1:24.86	2nd place, silver medalist(s)
Devanshi Satija	200 m Individual Medley SM10	—N/a		3:17.16	4
Devanshi Satija	100 m Breaststroke SB9	1:52.39	4	Did not advance	
Revathi Nayaka	100 m Breaststroke SB9	1:42.85	3 Q	1:44.50	6

== Para Shooting ==
=== Men ===
Athlete	Event	Qualification		Final	
Athlete	Event	Score	Rank	Score	Rank
Akash	P1 - Men's 10M Air Pistol - SH1	535-3X	23	Did not advance	
Deepender Singh	P1 - Men's 10M Air Pistol - SH1	561-12X	6 Q	130.3	7
Manish Narwal	P1 - Men's 10M Air Pistol - SH1	577-22X	2 Q	235.9 APGR	1st place, gold medalist(s)
Manish Narwal	P4 - Mixed 50M Free Pistol - SH1	534-4X	2 QWRJ	219.6 WRJ	2nd place, silver medalist(s)
Rahul Jakhar	P4 - Mixed 50M Free Pistol - SH1	528-3X	6 Q	192.6	3rd place, bronze medalist(s)
Singhraj Adhana	P4 - Mixed 50M Free Pistol - SH1	505-2X	15	Did not advance	
Deepak Saini	R3 - Mixed 10M Air Rifle Prone - SH1	629.2	12	Did not advance	
Deepak Saini	R6 - Mixed 50M Rifle Prone - SH1	604.8	14	Did not advance	
Sidhartha Babu	R6 - Mixed 50M Rifle Prone - SH1	606.6	10	Did not advance	

=== Women ===
Athlete	Event	Qualification		Final	
Athlete	Event	Score	Rank	Score	Rank
Pooja Agarwal	P2 - Women's 10M Air Pistol - SH1	532-7X	11	Did not advance	
Rubina Francis	P2 - Women's 10M Air Pistol - SH1	525-5X	15	Did not advance	
Avani Lekhara	R2 - Women's 10M Air Rifle Standing - SH1	611.6	10	Did not advance	
Avani Lekhara	R8 - Women's 50M Rifle 3 Position - SH1	1105-25x	7 Q	386.1	7
Avani Lekhara	R3 - Mixed 10M Air Rifle Prone - SH1	629.4	10	Did not advance	
Avani Lekhara	R6 - Mixed 50M Rifle Prone - SH1	604.8	13	Did not advance	

== Table Tennis ==
Singles

Athlete	Event	Group stage				Quarterfinal	Semifinal	Final	
Athlete	Event	Opposition Score	Opposition Score	Opposition Score	Rank	Opposition Score	Opposition Score	Opposition Score	Rank
Sandeep Dangi	Men's Singles TT1	Nam K-w (KOR); L 0–3	Latif (KUW); L 0–3	Chu W-c (TPE); L 0–3	4	—N/a			4
Yezdi Bhamgara	Men's Singles TT6	Thainiyom (THA); L 0–3	Hidayat (INA); L 1–3	—N/a	3	—N/a	Did not advance		
Sonal Patel	Women's Singles TT 1-3	Li Qa (CHN); L 0–3	Sharahi (IRI); W 3–0	Lee M-y (KOR); L 2–3	3	—N/a	Did not advance		
Bhavina Patel	Women's Singles TT4	Zhang Ba (CHN); L 0–3	Shin M-y (KOR); W 3–2	—N/a	2 Q	Jaion (THA); L 0–3	Did not advance		
Vaishnavi Sutar	Women's Singles TT6	Lee K-w (KOR); L 0–3	Zainab (IRQ); L 0–3	—N/a	3	—N/a	Did not advance		

Doubles

Athlete	Event	Quarterfinal	Semifinal	Final	
Athlete	Event	Opposition Score	Opposition Score	Opposition Score	Rank
Bhavina Patel; Sonal Patel	Women's Doubles TT 3-5	—N/a	Tarsilem / Osrita (INA); W 2–1	Dararat / Wararitdamrongkul (THA); L 0–2	2nd place, silver medalist(s)
Yezdi Bhamgara; Vaishnavi Sutar	Mixed Doubles Class 6-8	Chen Sl / Wong Y C (HKG); L 0–2	Did not advance		

== Tenpin Bowling ==
Men

Athlete	Event	G1	G2	G3	G4	G5	G6	Total	Rank
Venugopal Jayachandra	Men's Singles TPB8	184	175	125	140	169	194	987	11
Surjeet Singh	Mixed Singles TPB9	136	181	180	157	164	123	941	21
Channakeshava Jayaram	Mixed Singles TPB10	145	135	158	162	171	141	912	17
Channakeshava Jayaram; Surjeet Singh; Venugopal Jayachandra	Mixed Trios Team	450	471	454	419	—N/a		1794	15

== Wheelchair Fencing ==
=== Men Individual ===
Athlete	Event	Group stage							Round of 32	Round of 16	Quarterfinal	Semifinal	Final / BM	
Athlete	Event	Opposition Score	Opposition Score	Opposition Score	Opposition Score	Opposition Score	Opposition Score	Rank	Opposition Score	Opposition Score	Opposition Score	Opposition Score	Opposition Score	Rank
Ramesh Rao	Foil - Category A	Shin C-s (KOR); L 2–5	Nakagawa (JPN); L 3–5	Sun G (CHN); L 1–5	Cheong M C (HKG); L 1–5	Radilah (INA); W 5–4	Khanthithao (THA); L 1–5	6	Did not advance					
Venkatesha Babu	Foil - Category A	Sasajima (JPN); L 1–5	Sim J-h (KOR); L 1–5	Ng C F (HKG); L 4–5	Wijanarko (INA); W 5–2	Al-Khaldi (KUW); L 4–5	Jirasinwanich (THA); L 1–5	5	Did not advance					
Rakhal Sethy	Foil - Category A	Kano (JPN); L 1–5	Chen Yj (CHN); L 0–5	Al-Madhkhoori (IRQ); L 1–5	Chan W K (HKG); L 0–5	Kim S-h (KOR); L 1–5	Songchamrat (THA); W 5–2	6	Did not advance					
Devendra Kumar	Foil - Category B	Ali (IRQ); L 2–5	Fujita (JPN); L 1–5	Suwono (INA); W 5–3	Feng Yk (CHN); L 1–5	—N/a		3 Q	—N/a		Hu Dl (CHN); L 1–15	Did not advance		
Ramesh Rao	Epee - Category A	Nakagawa (JPN); W 3–1	Cho Y-r (KOR); L 2–5	Radilah (INA); W 5–1	Songchamrat (THA); W 5–4	Al-Madhkhoori (IRQ); L 1–5	—N/a	4 Q	Bye	Sriujun (MAS); W 15–13	Sun G (CHN); L 5–15	Did not advance		
Venkatesha Babu	Epee - Category A	Sasajima (JPN); L 3–5	Haswadi (MAS); L 1–5	Al-Khaldi (KUW); L 1–5	Sim J-h (KOR); L 0–5	Khanthithao (THA); L 4–5	—N/a	6	Did not advance					
Rakhal Sethy	Epee - Category A	Akhmad (INA); L 4–5	Shin C-s (KOR); W 5–4	Tian Jq (CHN); L 1–5	Jongjairak (THA); L 2–5	Al-Ogaili (IRQ); W 5–4	—N/a	4 Q	Kano (JPN); L 12–15	Did not advance				
Devendra Kumar	Epee - Category B	Azrul (MAS); L 0–5	Mnahi (IRQ); L 4–5	Hu Dl (CHN); L 0–5	Thongjapo (THA); L 3–5	Fujita (JPN); L 2–5	Suwono (INA); L 4–5	7	Did not advance					

=== Men Team ===
Athlete	Event	Quarterfinal	Semifinal / T	Final / CM	
Athlete	Event	Opposition Score	Opposition Score	Opposition Score	Rank
Ramesh Rao; Venkatesha Babu; Rakhal Sethy; Devendra Kumar	Foil	Iraq (IRQ); L 16–45	Did not advance	Thailand (THA); L 16–45	6
Ramesh Rao; Venkatesha Babu; Rakhal Sethy; Devendra Kumar	Epee	Japan (JPN); L 36–45	Thailand (THA); L 37–45	Indonesia (INA); L 42–45	8

== See also ==
- India at the 2018 Asian Games
