= Blind chess =

Blind chess may refer to:

- Blind Chess Olympiad, an international competition for blind players
- Blindfold chess, in which one or both of the players has their vision deliberately impaired
- Kriegspiel (chess), in which neither player can see their opponents' pieces

For organisations, see:

- International Blind Sports Federation (IBSA)
- International Braille Chess Association (IBCA)
