= Lubov Zsiltzova-Lisenko =

Ukrainian chess player

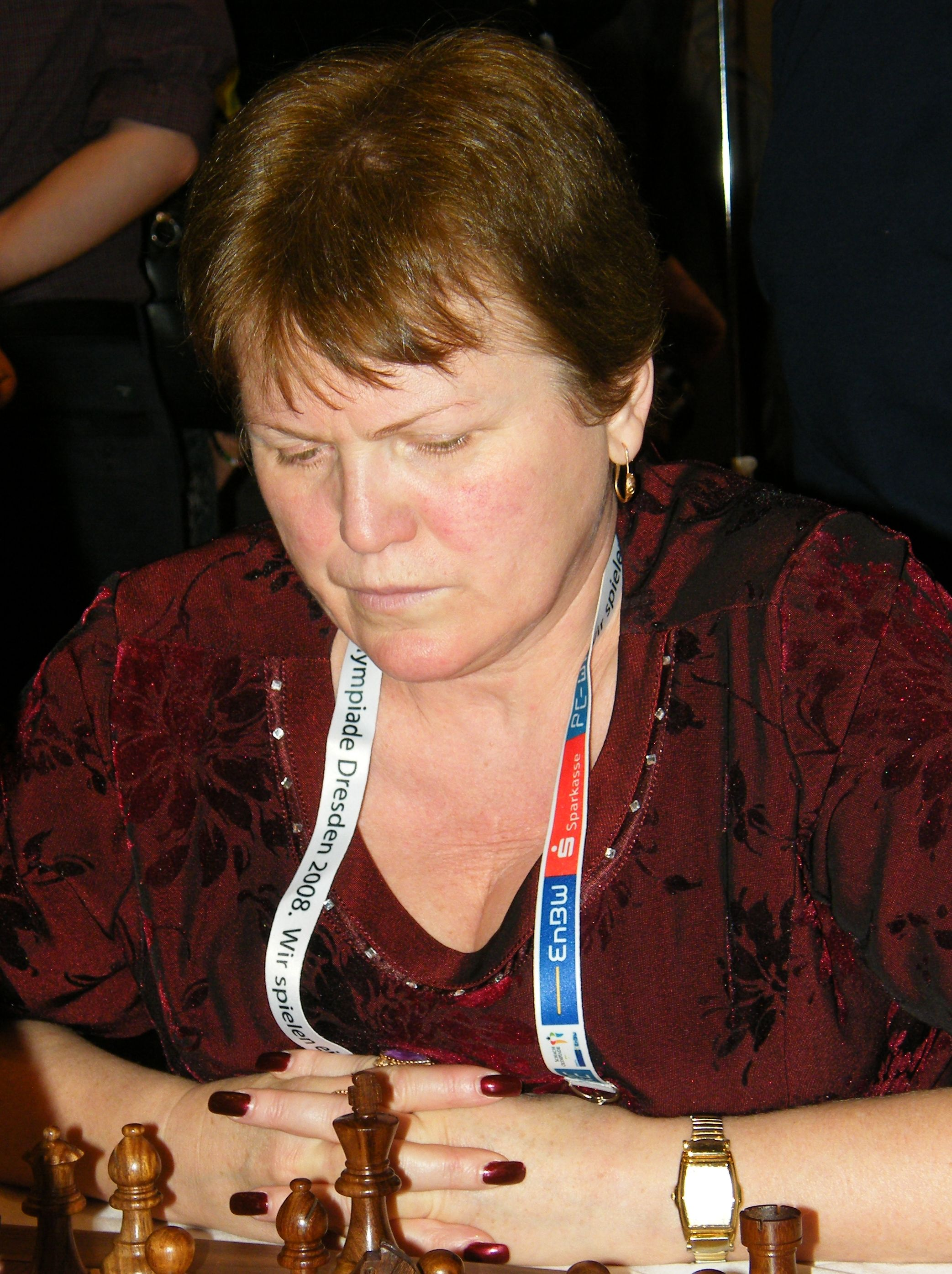
- Zsiltzova-Lisenko in 2008

Personal information
- Born: 20 October 1956 (age 69)

Chess career
- Country: Ukraine
- Title: Woman International Master (1996)
- Peak rating: 2296 (September 2009)

Lubov Zsiltzova-Lisenko (Ukrainian: Любов Жильцова-Лисенко; born 20 October 1956) is a Ukrainian chess player who holds the title of FIDE title of Woman International Master (WIM, 1996). She won the Ukrainian Women's Chess Championship in 1978 and is a two-time Women's Chess Olympiad individual gold medal winner (1994, 2006).

== Biography ==
Zsiltzova-Lisenko is one of leading female chess players in International Braille Chess Association (IBCA). In 1978, she won Ukrainian Women's Chess Championship. She is a five-time winner of the IBCA World Women's Chess Championships (1989, 1993, 1997, 2001, 2005). In 2009, she won a bronze medal in this tournament. Lubov Zsiltzova-Lisenko participated in IBCA World Open Chess Championships, where she won bronze medal (2006). Also she participated in IBCA European Open Chess Championships, where she won silver (1995) and bronze (1999) medals.

She played for IBCA team in the Women's Chess Olympiads:

- In 1994, at first board in the 31st Chess Olympiad (women) in Moscow (+9, =3, −1) and won an individual gold medal,
- In 1998, at first board in the 33rd Chess Olympiad (women) in Elista (+7, =3, −3),
- In 2000, at first board in the 34th Chess Olympiad (women) in Istanbul (+9, =2, −3),
- In 2002, at first board in the 35th Chess Olympiad (women) in Bled (+7, =3, −4),
- In 2006, at first board in the 37th Chess Olympiad (women) in Turin (+8, =2, −0) and won an individual gold medal,
- In 2008, at first board in the 38th Chess Olympiad (women) in Dresden (+7, =2, −2),
- In 2010, at first board in the 39th Chess Olympiad (women) in Khanty-Mansiysk (+6, =3, −2),
- In 2014, at first board in the 41st Chess Olympiad (women) in Tromsø (+6, =0, −5),
- In 2018, at first board in the 43rd Chess Olympiad (women) in Batumi (+7, =0, −3).

Zsiltzova-Lisenko played for Ukrainian team in the Blind Chess Olympiads, which participated 6 times (1992-2008, 2017). In team competition she won 3 silver (1996, 2008, 2017) and 3 bronze (1992, 2000, 2004) medals. For her individual performance she won gold (2008), silver (2017) and bronze (2000) medals.

In 1996, she received the FIDE Woman International Master (WIM) title.
