= Soundarya Pradhan =

Indian para chess player

Personal information
- Born: December 13, 1999 (age 26) Odisha, India

Chess career
- Country: India
- Peak rating: 1924 (March 2024)

Soundarya Kumar Pradhan (born 13 December 1999) is an Indian para chess player from Odisha. The visually challenged chess player was selected for the Indian team that took part in the 2022 Hangzhou Asian Para Games. He won the Men's Team Rapid VI-B1 gold medal on 28 October 2023 along with Darpan Inani and Ashwin Makwana. He also won a silver medal in the individual event.

== Early life and education ==
Pradhan was born in Boden, Nuapada district, Odisha. He is born to Rabi Ranjan Pradhan and Jayanthi Pradhan. After his schooling at the Boden Government High School, he studied at the Biju Patnaik College, where his father works as a lecturer. Currently, he is studying B.Tech. in computer science at the National Institute of Technology (NIT), Jamshedpur. He has Leber Congenital Amaurosis (LCA), a rare inherited eye disorder, from birth. He also teaches online chess to students in USA and is a coach at the Lucknow-based Chess Club Black and White (CCBW). He was felicitated by the chief minister of Odisha Naveen Patnaik with a cash award of Rs.1.5 crore. His brother Prachurya is also a visually challenged chess player. He learnt his basics from his uncle Keshranjan, a former National B chess player.

== Career ==
Pradhan was also part of the Indian team that won silver medal in the Men's Rapid Team Chess in the 2018 Asian Para Games held in Jakarta. In April 2022, he won the National Chess Championship for the visually challenged and made it to the Indian team for the World Team Championship. He won a gold at the 9th IBCA World Team Chess Championship for the Blind and Visually Impaired 2022 held at Ohrid, Macedonia in June 2022. In one of his first tournaments at the Junior National Chess Championship for Blind in January 2012 at Mumbai, he finished at the best under-13 player. In the 16th AICFB National Chess Championship for Visually Challenged in March 2023, he finished third.
