= Vladimir Raičević =

Serbian chess grandmaster (born 1949)

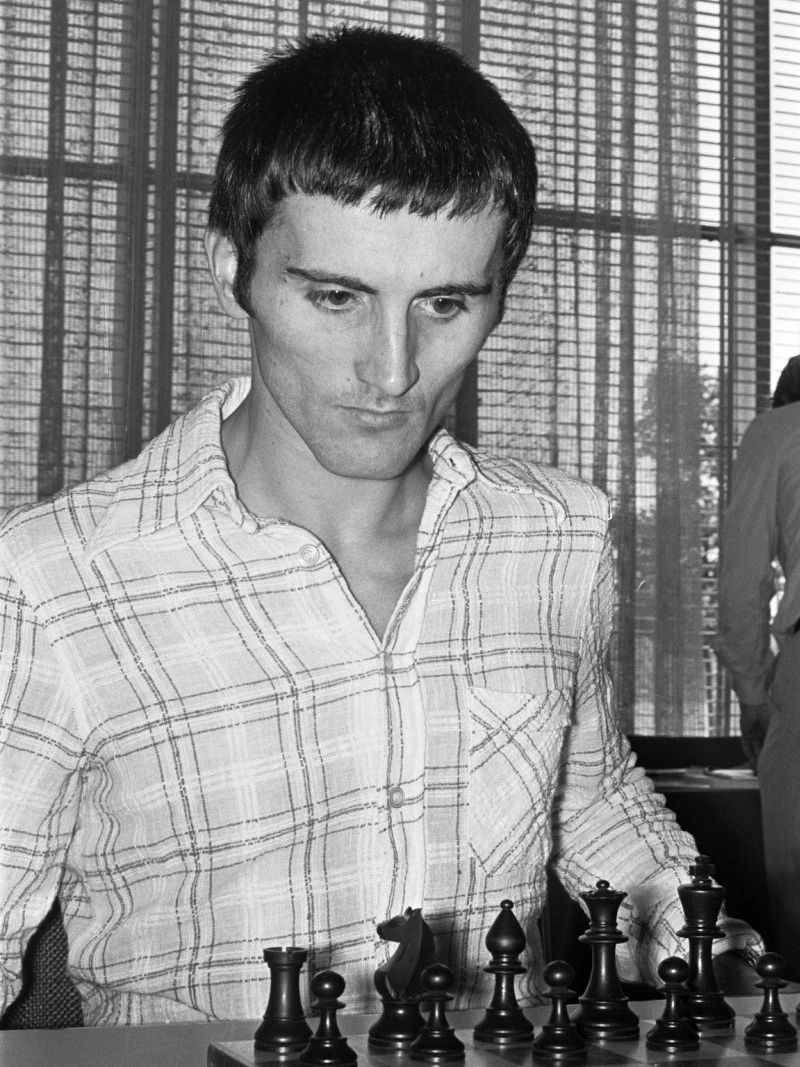
- Vladimir Raičević (1975)

Personal information
- Born: 2 May 1949 (age 77) Travnik, Yugoslavia

Chess career
- Country: Serbia
- Title: Grandmaster (1976)
- Peak rating: 2490 (May 1974)
- Peak ranking: No. 95 (May 1974)

Vladimir Raičević (born 2 May 1949) is a Serbian chess player. He received the title of Grandmaster in 1976.

== Notable games ==
- Nebojsa Nikolic vs Vladimir Raicevic, YUG-chT 2001. Semi-Slav Defence: Accelerated Move Order: 0-1.
