= 31st Chess Olympiad =

1994 chess tournament in Moscow, Russia

Official logo of the Olympiad

The 31st Chess Olympiad (Russian: 31-я Шахматная олимпиада, 31-ya Shakhmatnaya olimpiada), organized by FIDE and comprising an open and a women's tournament, took place between November 30 and December 17, 1994, in Moscow, Russia. Both tournament sections were officiated by international arbiter Yuri Averbakh of Russia.

The record number of nations once again counted some old faces playing under new flags. Yugoslavia was back, but now represented by the federation of Serbia-Montenegro. Another former Yugoslav republic, Macedonia, also made its debut, as did the Czech Republic and Slovakia who competed individually for the first time. Finally, the International Braille Chess Association entered two truly international teams.

The Russian team retained their title, captained by PCA world champion Kasparov. Due to a dispute with the national federation, FIDE champion Anatoly Karpov was not present. A strong performance from Bosnia-Herzegovina, led by Nikolić, earned them the silver, while the Russian "B" team of juniors, somewhat surprisingly, took the bronze—the first and only time that the same nation has occupied more than one medal rank.

== Open event ==
The open division was contested by 124 teams representing 122 nations plus Russia "B" and the IBCA. The time control for each game permitted each player 2 hours to make the first 40 of their moves, then an additional 1-hour to make the next 20 moves. In the event of a draw, the tie-break was decided by 1. The Buchholz system; and 2. Match points.

Open event
#	Country	Players	Average rating	Points	Buchholz
1	Russia	Kasparov, Kramnik, Bareev, Dreev, Tiviakov, Svidler	2714	37½	
2	Bosnia and Herzegovina	P. Nikolić, Sokolov, Kurajica, Dizdarević, N. Nikolić, Milovanović	2585	35	
3	Russia "B"	Morozevich, Zviagintsev, Ulibin, Rublevsky, Sakaev, Yemelin	2570	34½	457.5

#	Country	Average rating	Points	Buchholz	MP
4	England	2630	34½		
5	Bulgaria	2570	34	453.0	
6	Netherlands	2610	34	450.5	
7	United States	2598	34	432.5	
8	Hungary	2619	33½	449.5	
9	Ukraine	2624	33½	448.5	
10	Georgia	2564	33½	446.5	
11	China	2530	33½	443.5	
12	Belarus	2565	33½	434.0	
13	Armenia	2601	33	442.5	
14	Israel	2611	33	438.0	
15	Yugoslavia	2546	32½	453.0	
16	Germany	2611	32½	452.0	
17	Estonia	2536	32½	449.5	
18	Spain	2525	32½	440.0	
19	Latvia	2595	32	437.0	
20	Cuba	2508	32	433.0	18
21	Philippines	2465	32	433.0	16
22	Iceland	2553	32	432.0	
23	Uzbekistan	2569	32	427.5	
24	Lithuania	2528	31½	448.5	
25	Romania	2495	31½	438.5	
26	Croatia	2555	31½	435.0	
27	Poland	2496	31½	427.5	
28	Denmark	2501	31	440.0	
29	Czech Republic	2521	31	431.5	
30	Slovakia	2504	31	422.0	
31	Switzerland	2509	31	421.5	
32	Indonesia	2464	31	420.5	
33	Argentina	2519	30½	436.5	
34	France	2529	30½	432.5	
35	Kyrgyzstan	2428	30½	421.0	
36	Azerbaijan	2188	30½	420.0	
37	Slovenia	2455	30½	416.0	
38	Peru	2495	30½	410.5	
39	Mexico	2415	30½	403.5	
40	Turkmenistan	2418	30	425.0	
41	Moldova	2499	30	424.0	
42	Australia	2476	30	423.5	
43	Greece	2501	30	421.5	
44	Kazakhstan	2486	30	420.5	
45	Macedonia	2440	30	418.0	
46	Belgium	2345	30	405.0	
47	Norway	2464	29½	430.5	
48	Vietnam	2394	29½	418.5	
49	Turkey	2395	29½	408.5	15
50	Portugal	2449	29½	408.5	14
51	Finland	2375	29½	407.0	
52	Faroe Islands	2260	29½	367.5	
53	Italy	2448	29	411.5	
54	Scotland	2428	29	409.5	
55	India	2475	29	398.0	
56	Ireland	2303	29	394.5	
57	Tunisia	2381	29	393.0	
58	South Africa	2265	29	392.0	
59	Austria	2431	29	388.0	
60	Albania	2343	29	384.0	
61	Chile	2400	28½	405.5	
62	Brazil	2510	28½	402.0	
63	Luxembourg	2333	28½	396.5	
64	United Arab Emirates	2148	28½	367.5	
65	Canada	2440	28	413.0	
66	Bangladesh	2420	28	410.0	
67	Morocco	2270	28	399.0	14
68	Tajikistan	2320	28	399.0	12
69	Egypt	2385	28	395.5	
70	Algeria	2268	28	377.5	
71	Mongolia	2341	27½	397.5	
72	Ecuador	2180	27½	386.5	
73	Dominican Republic	2193	27½	372.5	
74	New Zealand	2314	27½	371.0	
75	Nigeria	2184	27½	370.5	
76	Wales	2178	27½	367.5	
77	Singapore	2359	27	392.5	
78	Uruguay	2391	27	388.5	
79	Colombia	2349	27	368.5	
80	IBCA	2255	26½		
81	Costa Rica	2289	26	377.5	
82	Iran	2210	26	375.5	
83	Zimbabwe	2135	26	359.5	
84	Hong Kong	2171	26	354.0	
85	Andorra	2134	26	348.5	
86	Iraq	2300	25½	390.0	
87	Japan	2261	25½	382.5	
88	Thailand	2128	25½	380.0	
89	Yemen	2000	25½	373.5	
90	Paraguay	2286	25½	372.0	
91	Liechtenstein	2204	25½	360.5	
92	Nicaragua	2183	25½	355.0	
93	Angola	2206	25½	356.5	
94	Guatemala	2053	25½	316.5	
95	Lebanon	2190	25	375.0	
96	Malaysia	2051	25	368.5	
97	El Salvador	2058	25	357.5	
98	Venezuela	2041	24½	378.0	
99	Bermuda	2040	24½	364.5	
100	Jordan	2213	24½	363.0	
101	Barbados	2123	24½	343.5	
102	Honduras	2000	24½	329.5	
103	Netherlands Antilles	2026	24½	322.5	
104	Puerto Rico	2250	24	373.0	
105	Qatar	2190	24	364.5	
106	Sudan	2146	24	349.0	
107	Malta	2094	24	345.0	
108	Haiti	2054	24	324.5	
109	Zambia	2051	23½	368.0	
110	Cyprus	2105	23½	355.0	
111	Botswana	2199	23½	347.5	
112	Fiji	2043	23½	327.5	
113	Mauritius	2051	23½	322.0	
114	Macau	2000	23½	315.0	
115	British Virgin Islands	2118	23	321.5	
116	San Marino	2053	23	319.5	
117	Palestine	2000	23	314.5	
118	Monaco	2000	22½		
119	Bahrain	2000	22		
120	Panama	2000	21½		
121	Namibia	2000	19		
122	Guernsey and Jersey	2000	15½		
123	Seychelles	2000	14		
124	United States Virgin Islands	2000	11		

=== Individual medals ===
- Performance rating: (Bulgaria) Veselin Topalov 2781
- Board 1: (Argentina) Daniel Hugo Cámpora 7½ / 9 = 83.3%
- Board 2: (Nicaragua) Carlos Dávila 11 / 14 = 78.6%
- Board 3: (Italy) Ennio Arlandi 7½ / 9 = 83.3%
- Board 4: (United States) Yasser Seirawan 8½ / 10 = 85.0%
- 1st reserve: (Wales) Leighton Williams 6 / 7 = 85.7%
- 2nd reserve: (Republic of Ireland) Brian Kelly 5½ / 7 = 78.6%

== Women's event ==
The women's division was contested by 81 teams representing 79 nations plus Russia "B" and the IBCA. The time control for each game permitted each player 2 hours to make the first 40 of their moves, then an additional 1-hour to make the next 20 moves. In the event of a draw, the tie-break was decided by 1. The Buchholz system; and 2. Match points.

The Georgian team, led by former world champion Chiburdanidze, retained their title. Hungary returned to the medal ranks due to the return of Zsuzsa and Zsófia Polgár. Meanwhile, little sister Judit played first board for the Hungarian team in the open event - the first woman to do so. China, captained by reigning world champion Xie Jun, took the bronze.

#	Country	Players	Average rating	Points	Buchholz
1	Georgia	Chiburdanidze, Ioseliani, Arakhamia-Grant, Gurieli	2463	32	
2	Hungary	Zsuzsa Polgár, Zsófia Polgár, Mádl, Csonkics	2472	31	
3	China	Xie Jun, Peng Zhaoqin, Qin Kanying, Zhu Chen	2420	27	351.0

#	Country	Average rating	Points	Buchholz
4	Romania	2357	27	346.0
5	Ukraine	2340	25	
6	Estonia	2255	24½	336.5
7	Germany	2352	24½	326.0
8	England	2270	24½	320.5
9	Israel	2260	24	346.0
10	Russia	2382	24	342.0
11	Kazakhstan	2267	24	338.0
12	Russia "B"	2238	24	337.5
13	Bulgaria	2317	24	328.0
14	Vietnam	2120	24	324.5
15	Belarus	2263	24	322.5
16	Greece	2280	24	314.0
17	Yugoslavia	2378	23½	332.5
18	Azerbaijan	2352	23½	329.5
19	Croatia	2258	23½	324.5
20	Poland	2298	23½	309.0
21	Czech Republic	2227	23½	304.0
22	United States	2317	23	329.5
23	Lithuania	2212	23	304.5
24	Armenia	2203	22½	323.5
25	Cuba	2203	22½	322.0
26	Bosnia and Herzegovina	2188	22½	320.5
27	Latvia	2317	22½	320.0
28	France	2180	22½	317.5
29	Indonesia	2167	22½	314.5
30	Slovenia	2167	22½	310.5
31	Uzbekistan	2150	22½	305.0
32	Mongolia	2143	22½	300.5
33	Denmark	2143	22½	289.0
34	India	2178	22	309.0
35	Netherlands	2213	22	302.0
36	Argentina	2152	22	301.0
37	Switzerland	2188	22	300.0
38	Moldova	2263	21½	343.0
39	Spain	2240	21½	316.5
40	Kyrgyzstan	2177	21½	301.0
41	Norway	2072	21½	287.0
42	Slovakia	2167	21	305.0
43	Sweden	2158	21	295.0
44	Brazil	2095	21	290.0
45	Macedonia	2113	20½	294.0
46	Finland	2058	20½	289.5
47	Italy	2015	20½	276.0
48	Ireland	2032	20½	274.5
49	Malaysia	2012	20½	272.0
50	Turkmenistan	2038	20	293.0
51	Scotland	2035	20	292.5
52	Canada	2090	20	287.0
53	IBCA	2115	20	285.5
54	Austria	2095	20	283.0
55	Colombia	2037	20	263.0
56	Australia	2118	19½	296.0
57	Venezuela	2027	19½	288.0
58	Turkey	2040	19½	275.0
59	Philippines	2003	19½	265.5
60	Chile	2022	19½	248.0
61	Dominican Republic	2000	19½	219.0
62	Bangladesh	2110	19	294.5
63	Mexico	2000	19	273.5
64	Algeria	2000	19	244.0
65	Wales	2003	19	226.5
66	Nigeria	2000	19	222.0
67	Ecuador	2000	18½	283.5
68	Portugal	2002	18½	281.0
69	Albania	2000	18½	273.5
70	Belgium	2000	18½	259.5
71	Iran	2000	18½	229.0
72	Puerto Rico	2002	18	240.0
73	Singapore	2003	18	223.5
74	New Zealand	2012	18	213.0
75	Costa Rica	2000	17½	
76	Zimbabwe	2003	17	
77	Seychelles	2000	14½	
78	Botswana	2000	10½	
79	Malta	2000	10	213.5
80	Netherlands Antilles	2000	10	212.0
81	United States Virgin Islands	2003	7½	

=== Individual medals ===
- Performance rating: (Hungary) Zsófia Polgár 2625
- Board 1: Lubov Zsiltzova-Lisenko (IBCA) 10½ / 13 = 80.8%
- Board 2: (Hungary) Zsófia Polgár 12½ / 14 = 89.3%
- Board 3: (Venezuela) Amelia Hernández 8½ / 9 = 94.4%
- Reserve: (Ukraine) Elena Sedina 10½ / 12 = 87.5%
