= Amelia Hernández =

Venezuelan chess player (born 1971)

Amelia Hernández Bonilla
Personal information
- Born: 7 June 1971 (age 55) Valencia, Venezuela

Chess career
- Country: Venezuela
- Title: Women FIDE Master (1988)
- Peak rating: 2126 (January 2001)

Amelia Hernández Bonilla (born June 7, 1971), is a Venezuelan chess Women FIDE Master (WFM) (1988), five-times Venezuelan Women's Chess Championships winner (1985, 1986, 1992, 1994, 2018), Women's Chess Olympiad individual gold medalist (1994).

== Biography ==
In 1987, Amelia Hernandez became the U-16 female Panamerican Champion. In 1988, in Aguadilla, Hernández won the World Youth Chess Championship in U18 female group. She was awarded the title of FIDE Master (WFM) for this success, becoming the first Venezuelan chess player to receive this title. Hernández won 5 times the Venezuelan Women's Chess Championships: in 1985, 1986, 1992, 1994 and 2018. In 1995, in Willemstad she won the Central American Women's Chess Cup.

Hernández played for Venezuela in the WorldWomen's Chess Olympiads:

- In 1988, at first board in the 28th Chess Olympiad (women) in Thessaloniki (+4, =2, -7),
- In 1992, at third board in the 30th Chess Olympiad (women) in Manila (+6, =4, -1), getting 5th place.
- In 1994, at third board in the 31st Chess Olympiad (women) in Moscow (+8, =1, -0), awarded with the Gold olympic medal, becoming the only Venezuelan Gold World Chess Olympic medalist.
- In 1996, at third board in the 32nd Chess Olympiad (women) in Yerevan (+7, =2, -3),
- In 2018, at second board in the 43rd Chess Olympiad (women) in Batumi (+3, =2, -3).
- In 2020, Hernández also played the "I World Online Chess Olympiad", as a member of the Venezuelan Olympic team, scoring 4/4 (100%).

In 1996, Hernández graduated from the Valencia University of Carabobo Faculty of Medicine, becoming a Medical Doctor. She completed a specialization degree, becoming an Obstetrician-Gynecologist. In 2017 she came back to chess after a 20 years gap, at Aruba Chess Challenge (Orangestaad), where she achieved 4th place, being the only female player. In January 2018 she became Venezuelan Female National Champion (Santo Domingo, Mérida), and joined the Olympic Team again, representing Venezuela at the World Chess Olympiad (Batumi, Republic of Georgia), 2018. Currently, Hernández continues her chess career. She got her FIDE instructor official certification and is focused on coaching and promoting chess in South Florida. Hernandez also became a chess teacher at Franklin Academy Sunrise campus. In addition, due to her chess player, chess coach and medical career accomplishments, Hernandez is also a current member of FIDE World Medical Commission, performing conferences in Chennai (India), Budapest (Hungary), San Jose (Costa Rica), and more recently in Samarkand (Uzbekistan) during the FIDE Congress at the World Chess Olympiad. In 2023, Dr. Amelia Hernandez became the first female Florida State Chess champion in Boca Raton, Florida, USA. Amelia Hernandez is currently focused on developing her health career, having achieved a Master degree in Nursing at Miami Regional University. At this time, she has approved the official certification board, becoming an Advanced Practice Nurse Practitioner, and works as an APRN for Vitas Healthcare in Broward, South Florida, USA.
