= Darpan Inani =

Indian chess player (born 1994)

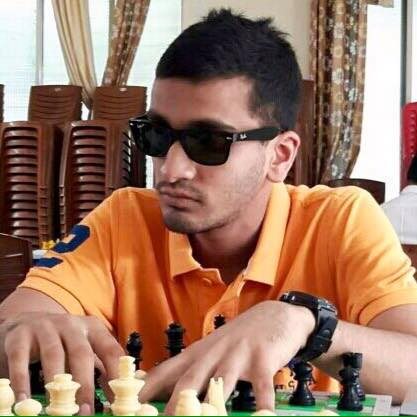

Personal information
- Born: 14 February 1994 (age 32) Udaipur, India

Chess career
- Country: India
- Title: A qualified Chartered Accountant, Para Asian Double Gold Medalist in Chess (2023), Bronze Medalist - World Junior Blind chess Championship (2013).
- Peak rating: 2135 (January 2020)

Darpan Inani is a prolific blind Indian chess player and a Chartered Accountant from Udaipur. He won 2 gold medals - individual as well as team gold medal - at Para Asian Games held in China in October, 2023. He had a career peak FIDE elo rating of 2135, the highest ever elo rating to have been attained by any visually impaired player from India as of January, 2024. He won a bronze medal on his respective board in the 16th World Chess Olympiad for visually impaired held in Greece in 2021. He was also a bronze medalist at the 2013 World Junior Championship in Belgrade. He is the youngest player to have ever won the National blind chess championships. He is the only Indian visually impaired chess player to have ever won international first prize at the Creon Open chess tournament in France in August 2018. This was a historic moment for Indian chess when a visually impaired player won first prize in international open sighted tournament in his rating category. He is honoured with the Yuva Ratna award by All India Marwari Yuva Manch in April 2018 in Siliguri, West Bengal. He is the recipient of the Navratna Award - 2018 awarded by Yuma Television. He has featured in a commercial for HDFC Life.

== Personal life ==
Inani's parents are Satish Inani (father) and Vimla Inani (mother). Born in Udaipur, family Shifted to Baroda, when 6 months old. As a three-year-old, he was affected by the Stevens–Johnson syndrome and lost his eyesight completely. He is a Chartered Accountant by qualification and Para Asian Double Gold Medalist in Chess.

He learned tabla for 6 years in Vadodara.

== Academics ==
Inani is a qualified Chartered Accountant (CA). He completed his entire schooling from a normal school, Baroda High school, Alkapuri, Vadodara Gujarat. He was the only blind student there. He Competing with the normal children, he seldom scored less than 90% and consistently scored a rank in top 3. He opted for commerce stream in his 11th std. and scored 99.75 percentage in 12th std. He completed his B.COM from Maharaja Sayajirav University, Vadodara. In 2015, he also appeared for CAT, an entrance exam for the most prestigious management institute in India - IIM, to pursue MBA. In his first attempt at CAT, he received calls from all the IIMs of the country barring IIM Ahmedabad. But finally, he rejected the admission offer from IIM Lucknow to pursue his CA and chess career.

== Career ==
Inani won his first open district tournament (under 14) at Baroda in the year 2007. He beat sighted opponents to win the title. He was the youngest to win the National blind chess championships in Mumbai in July 2010.

He was the youngest player to represent India at the World Blind Chess Championship in Serbia in 2010. He then represented India in the World junior chess championship for the visually challenged held at Rhodes in Greece in 2011.

He won the bronze medal in the World Individual Junior chess Championship for the blind and visually impaired held at Serbia in September 2013. He scored 6/9 along with Damjan Jandric of Serbia. He overcame Damjan in the tie-break to take the third position.

He is the only Indian visually impaired chess player to have ever won an international prize at the Creon open chess tournament (open sighted tournament) in his rating category (ELO 1800–1999) in France, in August 2018.

He won an Individual Bronze medal on the 3rd board at the 16th IBCA World Chess Olympiad for visually impaired held in Rhodes, Greece in October 2021.

== HDFC commercial ==
He was featured in an HDFC Life commercial entitled "Bounce Back". His life journey was the main theme of the advertisement, which illuminated how he overcame the manifold hurdles that came his way. This advertisement was appreciated and recognized by public at large.

== Special appearance ==
He was invited for a special interview on the occasion of 70th Republic day on the exclusive telecast of 'Proud to be Indian' of Republic News Channel, which is one of India's leading news channels headed by Arnab Goswami.

== Film ==
Inani has featured in the award-winning Chess documentary film Algorithms directed by Ian McDonald. Algorithms is a documentary on little known sporting field of Blind Chess in India. The film features three upcoming blind players who reveal their daily struggles, anxieties and hopes.

== Awards ==
Inani is honoured with the Yuva Ratna award by All India Marwari Yuva Manch in April 2018 in Siliguri, West Bengal. He is the recipient of the Navratna Award - 2018 awarded by Yuma Television.

== Public Speaking ==
Inani delivered a talk titled “Say ‘I Can’” at a TEDxYouth event at Lucknow Model College.

== Contributions ==
Inani has contributed towards the initiative of "INCLUSIVE EDUCATION" to encourage awareness and sensitization of inclusive education in the society. He believes that inclusive education not only helps in academic excellence but also leads to the development of the society holistically by promising full social inclusion.

He is also associated with Project checkmate, an initiative to spread blind chess in India. He has assisted this project with his inputs and advice and has also mentored its students.

== See also ==
- All India Chess Federation for the Blind
- Chess in India
- International Braille Chess Association
