= Rade Milovanović =

Bosnia and Herzegovina chess player

Personal information
- Born: 12 November 1954 Tuzla, Yugoslavia
- Died: 3 February 2024 (aged 69) Richardson, Texas, U.S.

Chess career
- Country: Yugoslavia → Bosnia and Herzegovina (before 2002); United States (after 2002)
- Title: International Master (1988)
- Peak rating: 2450 (January 1995)

Rade Milovanović (12 November 1954 – 3 February 2024) was a Bosnian chess International Master (IM) (1988) who has represented the United States since 2002, and was a Chess Olympiad team silver medalist in 1994.

== Biography ==
In 1972, in Tuzla Rade Milovanović won the Bosnia and Herzegovina Junior Chess Championship. In 1973, he won silver medal in the Yugoslavian Junior Chess Championship and won gold medal in the Balkan Junior Chess Championship.

Rade Milovanović played for Yugoslavia in the Men's Chess Balkaniad:

- In 1973, at first reserve board in the 5th Men's Chess Balkaniad in Poiana Brașov (+2, =2, -0) he won a team bronze medal and individual gold medal.

Rade Milovanović graduated University of Belgrade Faculty of Law in the mid-1970s. In 1988, he won International Chess Tournaments in Warsaw and Italy. In 1988, he was awarded the FIDE International Master (IM) title. In 1989, he came second in the International Chess Tournament in Tuzla. After the breakup of Yugoslavia, he represented Bosnia and Herzegovina.

Rade Milovanović played for Bosnia and Herzegovina in the Chess Olympiad:

- In 1994, at second reserve board in the 31st Chess Olympiad in Moscow (+1, =0, -1) and won a team silver medal.

Rade Milovanović moved to the United States in August 1998 and settled in Dallas. He won or split first place in several United States chess tournaments: PanAm Open (1998), Texoma Open (1999), Texas Masters (2002), U.S. Open Chess Championship (2008). In 1998, he won a chess tournament in Houston and in 1999 he won the Texas State Chess Championship. In 2000, Rade Milovanović shared 1st place in the international Chess Tournament in Las Vegas - National Open and in Dallas won the chess blitz tournament WBCA Grand Prix Blitz.

He worked as a chess coach for 20 years at the University of Texas at Dallas.
