= Ashwin Makwana =

Indian para chess player

Personal information
- Born: 1984 (age 41–42) Gujarat, India

Chess career
- Country: India
- Peak rating: 1938 (September 2012)

Ashwin Kanchanbhai Makwana (born 1984) is an Indian para chess player from Gujarat. The visually challenged chess player was selected for the Indian team that took part in the 2022 Asian Para Games, Hangzhou, China. He won the Men's Team Rapid VI-B1 gold medal on 28 October 2023 along with Darpan Inani and Soundarya Pradhan. He also won a bronze medal in the individual event on the same day.

== Personal life ==
Ashwin hails from Vadodara. He is a stock market dealer.

== Career ==
Makwana is a seven-times national champion. He took part in the National Chess tournament for the blind in 2016 which is one of his first major tournaments. In March 2017, he took part in the IBCA Asian Chess Championship for visually challenged. In 2018, he missed the National A for the blind chess title by a whisker and emerged as second. He took part in the World Championship in August 2010 along with Darpan Inani, Srikrishna Udupa and Rajesh Oza.
