= Neeraj Yadav (parathlete) =

Indian Paralympian track and field athlete (1984–2026)

Personal information
- Born: 10 February 1984 Uttar Pradesh, India
- Died: 27 October 2026 (aged 42) New Delhi, India

Sport
- Country: India
- Sport: Para-athletics
- Disability class: F55
- Coached by: Vipin Kasana
Medal record
Representing India
Asian Para Games
Gold medal – first place	2018 Jakarta	Javelin throw F55
Gold medal – first place	2022 Hangzhou	Discus throw F55
Gold medal – first place	2022 Hangzhou	Javelin throw F55

Neeraj Yadav (10 February 1984 – 27 October 2026) was an Indian Paralympian and javelin thrower. He primarily competed in discus, shotput and javelin at Asian Para Games in the F55 category. Yadav won gold at the 2018 Asian Para Games in Indonesia and defended it at the 2022 Asian Para Games.

== Background ==
Yadav hailed from Ghaziabad, Uttar Pradesh. He suffered paralysis and was diagnosed with neural damage at age 7. His father was a wrestler and a volleyball player. Yadav married in 2018. He started his Athletics career in 2015 after playing wheelchair tennis for about seven years.

== Career ==
Yadav won two gold medals at the 2022 Asian Para Games at Hangzhou, China in October 2023. He won discus throw in the F54/55/56 class on 24 October 2023 and added the javelin gold in the men's F55 category on 28 October 2023. In September 2022, he won gold at the Marrakech Para Athletics Grand Prix in Morocco with a new Indian National record. At the 2018 Asian Para Games he won a gold medal with an Asian Record of 29.84 metres. Earlier representing India, he won silver in the men's shot put and discus F55 event at Fazza Grand Prix in 2016.

He failed a doping test in 2023.

== Death ==
Neeraj Yadav died of suicide by poisoning at his home in New Delhi, on 27 October 2026, at the age of 42.

== See also ==
- Athletics in India
- India at the 2018 Asian Para Games
