= Radha Venkatesh =

Indian para athlete

Radha Venkatesh (born 2 May 1999) is a track & field paralympic athlete from Karnataka who represents India in the Women's 1500 metres. She won a silver medal in the T12/13 category for the visually impaired athletes at the 2026 Asian Para Games. She took part along with her guide Govind Solanki and clocked 5:30.90 seconds to accumulate 421 points for her silver medal.

== Early life ==
Radha is from Bommasamudra, Challakere taluk, Chitradurga district, Karnataka. Her parents are farmers who make their living selling flowers. She did her schooling at the Asha Kirana Blind School in Chitradurga. She was spotted by coach Rahul Balakrishna, who brought her to Bengaluru in 2017 and she trained under him for three years. She later joined the Sports Authority of India at the Bengaluru Centre.

== Career ==
In the 2022 Asian Para Games, she finished first with a timing of 5:19.35 but the event was declared as non-medal event due to limited number of participants.

She represented India at the 2018 Asian Para Games and won a silver medal in the 1500m in the same category.
