= Swapnil Patil (swimmer) =

Indian paralympic swimmer

Personal information
- Full name: Swapnil Patil
- Born: Maharashtra, India

Sport
- Country: India
- Sport: Para Swimming
Medal record
Para Swimming
Representing India
Asian Para Games
Bronze medal – third place	2014 South Korea	Swimming at the 2018 Asian Para Games
Silver medal – second place	2018 Jakarta	Swimming at the 2018 Asian Para Games

Swapnil Patil is an Indian para swimmer, who has won bronze and silver in Asian Para Games. In 2022 he has conferred with the Arjuna award by the Government of India.

== Education ==
Patil is from Kolhapur. He has done masters degree from in Shahaji College.

== Career ==
Patil won bronze in Asian Para Games in 2014. And in 2018 he won silver in Asian Para Games. In 2022 he has conferred with the Arjuna Award by the president of India.
