= Janki Bai =

Indian singer (1880–1934)

- Born: Janki Begum; 1880; Benaras, British India
- Died: 18 May 1934 (aged 53–54); Allahabad, British India
- Other name: Janki Bai of Allahabad
- Occupations: Singer; Poet; Classical Singer
- Years active: 1893 – 1934
- Spouse: Sheikh Abdul Haq (ex-husband)

Janki Bai (1880–1934), popularly known by her moniker Chhappan Chhuri (lit. "Fifty-six Knives"), was an Indian Hindustani classical singer, poet, and one of the earliest superstars of the gramophone era. A contemporary of Gauhar Jaan, she was a pioneer of commercial recording in India, producing over 250 songs across her career.

== Early life ==
Janki Bai was born in Benaras (now Varanasi) in 1880. After her father, a wrestler named Shivbalakram, abandoned the family, her mother, Manki, sought refuge in Allahabad where they were sold into a kotha (courtesan household). Despite these circumstances, Janki received a multifaceted education, becoming proficient in Persian, Urdu, Sanskrit, and English.

== Career ==
=== Musical career ===
Her formal musical training began under Ustad Hassu Khan. She excelled in various classical and light-classical genres, including thumri, dadra, khayal, ghazal, and kajri.

=== Gramophone success ===
Janki Bai was a massive commercial success. Her records often sold over 25,000 copies, and she commanded fees as high as ₹5,000 per performance. She was famous for her signature ending on recordings, where she would announce her name: "Mera naam Janki Bai Allahabad!".

=== Delhi Durbar ===
In 1911, she reached the height of her fame when she was invited to perform for Emperor George V at the Delhi Durbar. Alongside Gauhar Jaan, she sang a specially composed coronation song, "Yeh Jalsa Taajposhi Ka Mumbaarak Ho".

=== The name "Chhappan Chhuri" ===
Her nickname, Chhappan Chhuri, originated from a traumatic event in her youth. According to local legend, she survived a brutal knife attack—reputedly 56 stab wounds—inflicted by a rejected suitor or a miscreant. The resulting facial scars led her to perform behind a veil for much of her life, though she eventually embraced the name as a symbol of her resilience.

== Personal life ==
Janki Bai was married for a time to a lawyer, Sheikh Abdul Haq, but the marriage ended after a few years.

== Death ==
She died on May 18, 1934, in Allahabad.

== Literary work and philanthropy ==
Beyond music, Janki Bai was a recognized poet. She was mentored by the Urdu poet Akbar Allahabadi and published a collection of Urdu poems titled Diwan-e-Janki. In her later years, she devoted her wealth to charity. She founded a trust in Allahabad (now Prayagraj) that continues to support needy students and provide for the poor.

== Legacy ==
Her life is the subject of the Sahitya Akademi Award-winning novel Requiem in Raga Janki (2018) by Neelum Saran Gour. A monument known as Chhappan Chhuri Ki Mazaar exists in the Kaladanda Kabristaan in Prayagraj.
