= Shams Aalam =

Indian para swimmer (born 1986)

Personal information
- Full name: Mohammad Shams Aalam Shaikh
- Born: 17 July 1986 (age 40) Rathaus, Madhubani district, Bihar, India
- Website: www.shamsaalam.com

Sport
- Country: India
- Sport: Para Swimming
Medal record
Representing India

Mohammad Shams Aalam Shaikh (born 17 July 1986) is an Indian Para swimmer. He is currently ranked number 1 by the World Para Swimming (WPS) in men's 100 m butterfly (S5 category) and men's 50 m breaststroke (SB4 category) as on 2 February 2024. On 10 November 2024, he set a world record for longest open water swimming.

== Early life and education ==
Aalam was born in Rathaus Village, Madhubani District, Bihar, and later moved to Mumbai with his family. At the age of 24, he developed a benign tumour in his lower back which immobilized his lower half due to unsuccessful surgeries. He lives in Dharavi, Mumbai and holds a bachelor's degree in mechanical engineering from Rizvi College of Engineering and MBA from Sathyabama University, Chennai He comes from a family of wrestlers.

== Swim career ==
Aalam won four gold medals at the Indian Open Para Swimming Championship in 2018, and a bronze medal at the 2016 Can-Am Para Swimming Championships held in Gatineau, Quebec. He also represented India at the World Para Swimming Championship Maderia Portugal 2022 and 2018 Asian Para Games in Jakarta, Indonesia. He is also received Best Sportsperson with Disability Award by the president of India on 3 December 2021

== Athletic career ==
Aalam was interested in karate and participated in state and national karate events before 2010. After his surgery, he started to train as a swimmer. He won a total of 15 medals at the 12th to 17th Indian National Para Swimming Championship, and was selected for the Indian contingent for the 2018 Asian Para Games to participate at the S5 category for 50M and 100M Butterfly and Freestyle and various other categories. Aalam won Bronze at the 2016 Can-Am Para Swimming Championships held in Gatineau, Quebec in the men's 100m Breaststroke SB4 category.

In the 20th National Para-Swimming Championship, Shams won gold medals in 50m butterfly and 150m medley categories along with one silver in 100m freestyle.

In January 2025, Aalam won a gold in the 200m breaststroke with a new Indian record, three silver in 100m breaststroke, 200m individual medley and 200m freestyle, and two bronze in 50m breaststroke and 100m freestyle, at the Reykjavik International Games in Iceland.

In October 2026, Aalam was deported back to India from the 2026 Asian Para Games in Japan before competing, following allegations of sexual misconduct involving a female hotel employee. The Paralympic Committee of India stated that its chef de mission had recommended disciplinary action, including a possible lifetime ban, with further proceedings to follow the Games.

== Awards ==
Aalam Shaikh was awarded best emerging leader in disability sports and sports diplomacy by the U.S. Department of state global sports mentoring program 2018. His interview with Kiran Rai for the 300 most influential people in Asia 2020 was published by The New York Press News Agency. He was awarded the role model state award for the empowerment of Persons with Disabilities by the Social Welfare Department, Government of Bihar on the occasion of International Day of Persons with Disabilities 2020. He also got the best international athlete of the year 2020 by Bihar Para Sports Association. On 22 February 2025, he received the Mastery Award at the 23rd CavinKare Ability Awards 2025 organised along with the Ability Foundation in Chennai.

== Records ==
On 8 April 2017, he swam 9 km in 4 hours at Candolim Beach, Goa. It was the world record for longest open sea swimming by a paraplegic person.

He also set a world record for the longest open water swimming at the National Takshila open Water swimming competition in Patna, Bihar, where he swam 13 km in the Ganga river. The record was ratified by the World Records Union.

In January 2025, Aalam won gold in the 200m breaststroke, with a new Indian and Asian record at the Reykjavik International Games in Iceland.

== See also ==
- Mariyappan Thangavelu
