= All India Chess Federation for the Blind =

Blindness organization based in India

- Sport: Chess
- Jurisdiction: India
- Abbreviation: AICFB
- Founded: 1997
- Affiliation: International Braille Chess Association
- Affiliation date: 1998
- Regional affiliation: All India Chess Federation
- Affiliation date: 1998
- Headquarters: AICFB, 45/20, BDD Block; Dr. Bhosale Marg; Worli, Mumbai
- President: Charudatta Jadhav
- Secretary: Manish Thool

Official website
- www.aicfb.in
- (India)

The All India Chess Federation for the Blind (AICFB) is the governing body for the game of Chess among visually impaired in India. It was formed in 1997 with a view to promoting the game of chess among the visually impaired all over the country. It is registered under Society Registration Act, 1860; Public Trust Act, 1951 and Income Tax Act, 1961 – Section 12A.

== Aims and objectives ==
Although the main objective of the organisation is to promote the game among the visually impaired all over India, the organisation has a set of aims and objectives such as

- Forming state associations in all the states in the country
- Providing playing opportunities to all players all over the country.
- Publishing and provide Braille books on chess to help players develop their game.
- Building an audio-cassette library, which provides information and analysis of chess games.
- Making available computers, relevant software etc.
- Organizing seminars and coaching camps.
- Interacting with the government and introduce chess as a subject in blind schools.
- Organizing local, regional and National level tournaments.
- Sending teams to participate in International chess tournaments.
- Affiliating to the International Braille Chess Association and represent India on International forum for blind chess.
- Organizing international tournaments, seminars etc.
- Identifying the talent at early stage and groom them to represent the country at world championships.
- Design system to transform chess for the blind in the country and serve the vision of making India one of the top three countries in the world for chess for the blind.

== Affiliations ==
The AICFB is affiliated to the International Braille Chess Association (IBCA) in 1998 and All India Chess Federation. Through this affiliation the AICFB has been able to integrate India with the rest of the blind chess-playing world.

== Affiliated states ==
The AICFB has a number of affiliated state bodies and more than 2500 active chess players under it all over India.

- Haryana
- Karnataka
- Punjab
- Delhi
- Uttar Pradesh
- Uttaranchal
- Rajasthan
- Maharashtra
- Andhra Pradesh
- Jharkhand
- Bihar
- Kerala
- Tamil Nadu
- Odisha
- Madhya Pradesh

== Events ==
Till now the AICFB has organised 19 Zonal levels chess tournaments, 9 National tournaments & sent Indian teams 12 times to participate in the World Chess Championship. It has also organised the first ever Asian Chess Championship in December 2003, which was the first International chess tournament in India and the 11th Individual World Chess Championship for the Blind 2006 which was held outside Europe, in India for the very first time. Sixteen Indian teams have participated in various world events in the last ten years and the last one even returned with a gold medal from the Chess Olympiad for the Blind held at Crete in October 2009. The 14th IBCA Chess Olympiad was also hosted in India by AICFB in August 2012. In the year 2019, the Federation head disclosed that annually the Federation conducts 35-40 tournaments with 5 National,4 Zonal, and rest National A and B tournaments, and FIDE-rating contests. In year 2019, for the first time since its inception the Organisation had hosted the first National School Chess Championship for the Blind at the Mumbai Maratha Fruitwala Dharamshala, Alandi, in which at least 200-plus players participated in the categories of u-10, u-12, u-14, u-16 and open categories for other age groups and is designed to be played Swiss League Format. In 2019, the AICFB had also launched Chess Mitra, an app for the blind.

Till year 2016, All India Chess Federation for the Blind has more than 22,000 registered members, with more than 1,300 who play in national-level events. Among them, 161 are rated in world, and to promote the players in competitions, Zonal events help players qualify for the National B and then National A, which is currently the highest level of tournament nationally.

In the year 2018, Indian batting great Sachin Tendulkar had promised to support the National Chess Championship for the visually challenged during a blind chess tournament in which 14 blind players from across the country had participated being the prestigious event as the final winner was crowned India's National Blind Chess Champion for that year.

== Professional training program ==
According to Charudutta, the founder of the AICFB, the organisation has identified 38 schools in 16 states to initiate a programme for professional training.

National Executive Council

- Charudatta V Jhadav (President)
- Ram Niwas Varma (Vice President North Zone)
- Kishan Gangolli (Vice President South Zone)
- Amar Kumar Sharma (Vice President East Zone)
- Madan V Bagayatkar (Vice President West Zone)
- Manish Dnyaneshwar Thool (General Secretary)
- Vignesh R (Joint Secretary South Zone)
- Viral Hitendrbhai Trivedi (Joint Secretary West Zone)
- Swapnil Navalchand Shah (Treasurer)

== See also ==
- All India Chess Federation
