= Vijay Kumar (athlete) =

Indian paralympic athlete

Personal information
- Nationality: Indian
- Born: 3 January 1987 (age 39) Muzaffarnagar, Uttar Pradesh

Sport
- Country: India
- Sport: Para Athletics
- Event(s): 100m, Long Jump
Medal record
Asian Para Games
Silver medal – second place	2018 Indonesia	Long jump T42

Vijay Kumar (born 3 January 1987) is an Indian Para athlete competing in Men's 100m, Long Jump events in the T42 category. He was a silver medalist at the Asian Para Games 2018 held in Jakarta, Indonesia. He won his medal in the Men’s Long Jump.

== Early life ==
Vijay Kumar was born in 1987 in Muzaffarnagar and suffered from a Left leg lower limb polio by birth. Vijay, at a very early stage, represented his state in Para athletics, playing alongside able-bodied athletes.
