= Reginald Bonham =

English blind chess player

Personal information
- Born: Reginald Walter Bonham; 31 January 1906 St. Neots, Cambridgeshire, England
- Died: 16 March 1984 (aged 78) Worcester, England

Chess career
- Country: England

Reginald Walter Bonham (31 January 1906 – 16 March 1984) was an English blind chess player and teacher known for his achievements in both blind and sighted chess. After founding the International Braille Chess Association in 1951, he became the Blind World Chess Champion in 1958 and the Correspondence Blind World Champion in 1957, 1959, 1961, 1964 (jointly) and 1966.

== Biography ==
In 1906, Reginald Bonham was born in St. Neots, England to a family of butchers. Like others in his family, Bonham was born visually impaired. He was sent to enter Worcester College for the Blind at age 16. During 1922–1925 at Worcester, he revealed a talent for both rowing and chess, which he learned in 1922. In 1926, he attended St Catherine's College, Oxford where he won the Oxford sighted chess championship in 1929, as well as made the final trials for the Oxford rowing team.

=== Teaching career ===
In 1929, Bonham returned to the Worcester College for the Blind as a teacher. He taught mathematics and braille as well as coached rowing, amateur drama, bridge, and chess. "Bon", as he was known by staff, headed four separate chess teams in the local and county leagues, of which all won multiple championships. In his later years, one of his students was Peter White, who later became a prominent radio broadcaster. Bonham is described in detail in White's 1999 autobiography, See It My Way. Bonham taught at Worcester until he retired in 1970.

=== Chess ===
Bonham won numerous tournaments throughout Worcester and the English Midlands. In 1934, he founded the Braille Chess Magazine (BCM), which he wrote and edited for 25 years, and after World War II, he took up correspondence chess, and founded the first correspondence chess tournament for the blind in 1951. In 1951 he founded the International Braille Chess Association which became affiliated with FIDE in 1964. Bonham won the first English Blind Chess Championship in 1956. In addition to his achievements against the visually impaired, Bonham also had many victories against sighted competition. He won the Hastings Reserve Tournament in 1931, the Birmingham Tournament on three consecutive occasions, was Worcestershire County Champion twenty times, was champion of the nine Midlands Counties three times and won the Birmingham Post Cup twice. On six occasions he competed in the British Chess Championship where his best result was ninth place.

=== Later life ===
He died in Worcester, England at the age of 78.
