= Nebojša Nikolić =

Bosnia and Herzegovina chess player

Personal information
- Born: 23 March 1968 (age 58)

Chess career
- Country: Yugoslavia; Bosnia and Herzegovina
- Title: International Master (1991)
- Peak rating: 2401 (July 2002)

Nebojša Nikolić (born 23 March 1968) is a Bosnian chess International Master (IM) (1991) and Chess Olympiad team silver medalist (1994).

== Biography ==
In 1985, in Heraklion Nebojša Nikolić, with the Yugoslavian Youth Team, participated in Chess Balkaniad and won silver medals in both the team and individual competitions. After the breakup of Yugoslavia, he represented Bosnia and Herzegovina. In 1993, in Zagreb Nebojša Nikolić participated in the FIDE Zonal Chess tournament. In this same year he, along with Sarajevo chess club ŠK Bosna Sarajevo, won a bronze medal in the European Chess Club Cup. In 2002 he with, chess club ŠK Kiseljak, won a silver medal in Bosnia and Herzegovina chess leagues.

Nebojša Nikolić played for Bosnia and Herzegovina in the Chess Olympiad: In 1991, he was awarded the FIDE International Master (IM) title. In 1994, at first reserve board in the 31st Chess Olympiad in Moscow (+1, =1, -0), and won a team silver medal.
