= Blind Chess Olympiad =

Chess olympiad for visually impaired players

The Blind Chess Olympiad is an international chess competition for the blind in which teams from all over the world compete against each other. The event takes place every four years, and is sponsored by the International Braille Chess Association. The Blind Chess Olympiad is the largest sporting event in the international field of chess for the visually impaired.

== History ==
The forerunner to the Blind Chess Olympiads was a blind chess tournament held in Rheinbreitbach, Germany, in 1958. The winner of the event was Reginald Walter Bonham, who would found the International Braille Chess Association. The first official Blind Chess Olympiad was held in 1961 in Meschede, Germany. Eight teams competed to play 122 games in round-robin format with Team Yugoslavia as the resulting winner. For the third Blind Chess Olympiad in 1968, held in Weymouth, England, 20 teams competed. Russia won the event with Yugoslavia in second place. The Polish team arrived by train in the early hours of the morning bringing with them the body of their sighted translator who had died en route (Reference: Organizer, John Graham). By the 2008 13th Blind Chess Olympiad in Heraklion, Crete, 34 teams participated, making the Blind Chess Olympiad the most significant sporting event in the international field of chess for the blind to date.

== Results ==
#	Year	City	Winner	Ref
1	1961	Meschede, Germany	Yugoslavia	
2	1964	Kühlungsborn, Germany	Yugoslavia	
3	1968	Weymouth, United Kingdom	Soviet Union	
4	1972	Pula, Croatia	Soviet Union	
5	1976	Kuortane, Finland	Soviet Union	
6	1980	Noordwijkerhout, Netherlands	Soviet Union	
7	1985	Benidorm, Spain	Soviet Union	
8	1988	Zalaegerszeg, Hungary	Soviet Union	
9	1992	Majorca, Spain	Russia	
10	1996	Laguna, Brazil	Russia	
11	2000	Zakopane, Poland	Russia	
12	2004	Tarragona, Spain	Poland	
13	2008	Heraklion, Greece	Russia	
14	2012	Chennai, India	Russia	
15	2017	Ohrid, North Macedonia	Russia	
16	2021	Rhodes, Greece	Russia	
17	2025	Vrnjačka Banja, Serbia	Poland	

== See also ==
- Chess variants
