= International Braille Chess Association =

Organisation for blind chess players

- IBCA logo
- Abbreviation: IBCA
- Formation: 1958
- Type: International nongovernmental organization
- Headquarters: Homberg, Germany
- President: Jörgen Magnusson
- Affiliations: FIDE, IBSA
- Website: www.ibca-info.org

The International Braille Chess Association (IBCA) is an organisation for blind and vision-impaired (VI) chess players. The IBCA is a International Chess Federation-affiliated chess organisation as well as a part of the International Blind Sports Federation.

The IBCA hosts two major competitions: the Blind Chess Olympiad and the Blind World Chess Championship.

== History ==
The International Braille Chess Association originated informally in 1951 with the organisation (by Reginald Walter Bonham (1906–1984)) of the first international correspondence chess tournament for blind players; the tournament included 20 players representing 10 countries. It first organised an over-the-board tournament in 1958, with representatives from seven countries. IBCA became affiliated with FIDE in 1964.

Today, it has grown to encompass over 75 member nations around the world.

== Rule modifications ==
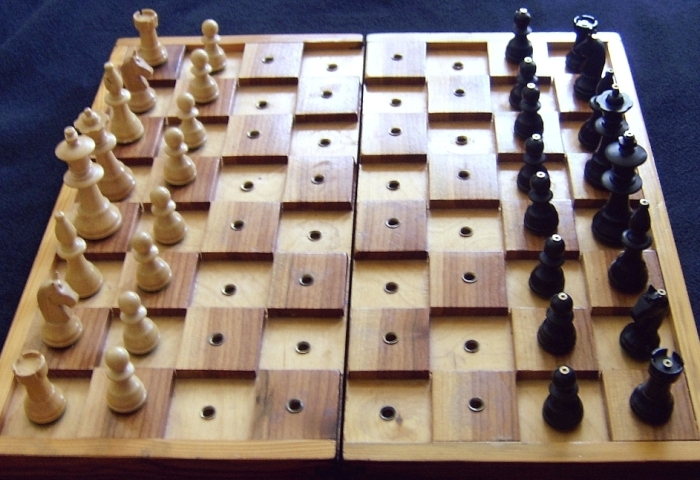
Chessboard for blind players

Although most of the rules in blind chess are consistent with normal chess, there are a few modifications to the equipment to aid blind and VI players:

Either player may demand the use of two boards, the sighted player using a standard board, the VI player using a board that is specially constructed:

1. All the black squares are raised about 3–4 mm above the white squares on the chessboard. By feeling the squares, the player is able to determine whether the square is a black or a white one.
2. Each of the squares on the board has a hole in the centre so that the chess pieces can be fixed in these holes.
3. Each of the pieces has a downward projection (nail) at the base, which fits into the hole in the squares on the board, thereby fixing the piece securely on the board.
4. All the black pieces have a pin fixed on their heads helping the player distinguish between a white and a black piece.

After making every move, each player is required to announce their move aloud to their opponent. Instead of writing the moves on a chess score sheet, the VI player writes the moves in braille or records the moves on a voice recorder.

== IBCA Member Countries ==
Nr.	Country	National member federation recognised by the IBCA
1	Argentina	ACUA (Ajedrecistas Ciegos Unidos de Argentina)
2	Austria	Österreichischen Blindenschachbund
3	Azerbaijan	Azerbaijan Braille Chess and Draughts Federation
4	Bangladesh	Association For Blind Chess (AFBC)
5	Belarus	National Paralympic Committee of Belarus
6	Belgium	BSFVG (Belgische Schaak Federatie voor Visueel Gehandicapten)
7	Bolivia	Federación boliviana de deportes para ciegos (FEBODEC)
8	Brazil	Federação Brasileira de Xadrez para Deficientes Visuais
9	Bulgaria	Bulgarian Sports Federation for the Visually Impaired
10	Canada	Braille Chess Canada / Échecs Braille Canada
11	Chile	Consorcio ajedrez para ciegos de Chile
12	Colombia	Federación deportes limitados visuales de Colombia (FEDELIV)
13	Costa Rica	Asociación Deportiva de Ajedrecistas Especiales (ADAES)
14	Croatia	Croatian Blind Sport Association
15	Czech Republic	
16	Denmark	Danmarks blindeskak skak forenings kontakt
17	Dominican Republic	
18	El Salvador	
19	Ecuador	Federación Ecuatoriana de deportes para personas con discapacidad visual (FEDEDIV)
20	Finland	
21	France	AEPA (Association Echiquéenne pour les Aveugles)
22	Germany	Deutscher Blinden-und Sehbehinderten Schachverband e.V. (DBSB)
23	Greece	Hellenic Sport Federation for persons with disabilities
24	Guatemala	Comité pro ciegos y sordos de Guatemala
25	Honduras	Federación Nacional de deportes para ciegos de Honduras (FENADECI)
26	Hungary	FODISZ
27	Iceland	
28	India	All India Chess Federation for the Blind
29	Indonesia	National Paralympic Committee (NPC) Indonesia
30	Iran	I.R. Iran Sports Federation for the Blind and Visually Impaired
31	Ireland	Braille Chess Association of Ireland
32	Israel	Israeli Chess Association for the Blind & Visually Handicapped
33	Italy	ASCId (Associazione Scacchisti Ciechi Italiani dilettantistica)
34	Kazakhstan	Kazakhstan Chess Federation of Athletes with Disabilities
35	Kenya	Chess Kenya Federation
36	Kosovo	ër të Verbër e Kosovës
37	Kyrgyz Republic	Kyrgyz Republic Public Association “Chess and Draughts union of the Kyrgyz Republic among disabled people”
38	Latvia	
39	Lithuania	Lietuvos aklųjų sporto federacijos
40	North Macedonia	National Union of the Blind of North Macedonie
41	Mexico	Asociación Mexicana de Deportes Adaptados Para Ciegos y Débiles Visuales A.C.
42	Moldova	Moldova Blind Sport Federation
43	Mongolia	
44	Montenegro	Union of the Blind of Montenegro
45	Netherlands	NSVG (Nederlandse schaakvereniging voor visueel gehndicapte)
46	Nicaragua	Asociación Nicaragüense de Deportes para Ciegos (ANDECI)
47	Norway	
48	Pakistan	Pakistan Blind Sports Federation
49	Panama	Asociación nacional de deportes para ciegos de Panamá (ANADEPC)
50	Paraguay	
51	Peru	
52	Philippines	Philippines Para Chess Association
53	Poland	CROSS
54	Portugal	Liga Portuguesa de Desporto para Surdos
55	Puerto Rico	Federación puertorriqueño de deportistas ciegos
56	Romania	Romanian Association of the Blind
57	Russia	All-Russian Society of the Blind
58	Serbia	National sports organisation of blind and visually impaired
59	Slovakia	Slovenská asociácia zrakovo postihnutých športovcov
60	Slovenia	National Paralympic Committee of Slovenia
61	South Africa	South African Braille Chess Association
62	Spain	Federación Española de Deportes para Ciegos (FEDC)
63	Sri Lanka	Sri Lanka Council for the Blind
64	Sweden	The Swedish chessfederation for visually impaired
65	Switzerland	
66	Thailand	Thailand Boardgame Club for the Blind
67	Turkey	Turkish Blind Sports Federation
68	Turkmenistan	Chess Center for the Blind of Turkmenistan
69	Ukraine	Sports Federation of the Blind of Ukraine
70	United Kingdom	Braille Chess Association of the United Kingdom
71	United States of America	USBCA
72	Uzbekistan	Uzbekistan Blind sport federation
73	Venezuela	Federación Polideportiva de ciegos de Venezuela (FEPOCIVE)
74	Vietnam	Vietnam Chess Federation
75	Zimbabwe	Zimbabwe Braille Chess Association
