= Philippines at the 2023 ASEAN Para Games =

- IPC code: PHI
- NPC: Paralympic Committee of the Philippines

in Phnom Penh
- Competitors: 174 in 13 sports
- Flag bearer: Ariel Joseph Alegarbes (Swimming)
- Medals Ranked 5th: Gold 34 Silver 33 Bronze 49 Total 116

ASEAN Para Games appearances (overview)
- 2001; 2003; 2005; 2008; 2009; 2011; 2013; 2015; 2017; 2022; 2023; 2025

The Philippines competed at the 2023 ASEAN Para Games in Phnom Penh, Cambodia which ran from 3 to 9 June 2023.

The delegation led by chef de mission Walter Torres had 259 people – 174 of which are athletes who competed in 13 sports.

Ariel Joseph Alegarbes of the Philippine Para Swimming Team served as the flagbearer for the opening ceremony.

The Philippines finished fifth overall in the medal tally with 34 gold, 33 silver, and 50 bronze medals.

== Medalists ==
=== Gold ===
No.	Medal	Name	Sport	Event	Date
1	Gold	Gary Bejino	Swimming	Men's 400m freestyle S6	4 June
2	Gold	Ernie Gawilan	Swimming	Men's 400m freestyle S7	4 June
3	Gold	Cendy Asusano	Athletics	Women's shot put F54	4 June
4	Gold	Marydol Pamati-an	Powerlifting	Women's 41 kg – Total	4 June
5	Gold	Angel Otom	Swimming	Women's 50m backstroke S5	4 June
6	Gold	Darry Bernardo	Chess	Men's individual rapid	4 June
7	Gold	Darry Bernardo; Israel Peligro; Menandro Redor	Chess	Men's team rapid VI–B2/B3	4 June
8	Gold	Cheyzer Mendoza	Chess	Women's individual rapid PI	4 June
9	Gold	Gary Bejino	Swimming	Men's 200m freestyle S6	5 June
10	Gold	Cendy Asusano	Athletics	Women's javelin throw F54	5 June
11	Gold	Ariel Alegarbes	Swimming	Men's 50m butterfly SB14	5 June
12	Gold	Evaristo Carbonel	Athletics	Men's javelin throw F11	5 June
13	Gold	King James Reyes	Athletics	Men's 800m T46	6 June
14	Gold	Rosalie Torrefiel	Athletics	Women's javelin throw F11	6 June
15	Gold	Andrei Kuizon	Athletics	Men's shot put F54	6 June
16	Gold	Ariel Alegarbes	Swimming	Men's 200m individual medley SM14	6 June
17	Gold	Angel Otom	Swimming	Women's 200m individual medley SM5	6 June
18	Gold	Jerrold Mangliwan	Athletics	Men's 400m T52	6 June
19	Gold	Angel Otom	Swimming	Women's 50m butterfly S5	7 June
20	Gold	Ernie Gawilan	Swimming	Men's 200m individual medley SM7	7 June
21	Gold	Evaristo Carbonel	Athletics	Men's discus throw F11	7 June
22	Gold	Jerrold Mangliwan	Athletics	Men's 200m T52	7 June
23	Gold	Angel Otom	Swimming	Women's 50m freestyle S5	7 June
24	Gold	Cheryl Angot; Fe Mangayayam; Cheyzer Mendoza	Chess	Women's team standard PI	7 June
25	Gold	Cheyzer Mendoza	Chess	Women's individual standard PI	7 June
26	Gold	Darry Bernardo; Menandro Redor; Arman Subaste	Chess	Men's team standard VI–B2/B3	7 June
27	Gold	Darry Bernardo	Chess	Men's individual standard VI–B2/B3	7 June
28	Gold	Andrei Kuizon	Athletics	Men's javelin throw F53–54	7 June
29	Gold	Sander Severino	Chess	Men's individual blitz PI	8 June
30	Gold	Felix Aguilera; Henry Roger Lopez; Sander Severino	Chess	Men's team blitz PI	8 June
31	Gold	Cheyzer Mendoza	Chess	Women's individual blitz PI	8 June
32	Gold	Cheryl Angot; Cheyzer Mendoza; Jean-Lee Nacita	Chess	Women's team blitz PI	8 June
33	Gold	Darry Bernardo	Chess	Men's individual blitz VI–B2/B3	8 June
34	Gold	Darry Bernardo; Menandro Redor; Arman Subaste	Chess	Men's team blitz VI–B2/B3	8 June

=== Silver ===
No.	Medal	Name	Sport	Event	Date
1	Silver	Alfie Cabañog; John Rey Escalante; Rene Macabenguil; Kenneth Christopher Tapia; Cleford Trocino	Wheelchair basketball	Men's 3x3 tournament	3 June
2	Silver	Marydol Pamati-an	Powerlifting	Women's 41 kg – Best lift	4 June
3	Silver	Achelle Guion	Powerlifting	Women's 45 kg – Best lift	4 June
4	Silver	Achelle Guion	Powerlifting	Women's 45 kg – Total	4 June
5	Silver	Ariel Alegarbes	Swimming	Men's 100m breaststroke SB14	4 June
6	Silver	Ernie Gawilan	Swimming	Men's 100m freestyle S7	4 June
7	Silver	Deterson Omas	Judo	Men's –73 kg J1	4 June
8	Silver	Sander Severino	Chess	Men's individual rapid PI	4 June
9	Silver	Cheryl Angot; Cheyzer Mendoza; Jean-Lee Nacita	Chess	Women's team rapid PI	4 June
10	Silver	Teresa Bilog	Chess	Women's individual rapid VI–B2/B3	4 June
11	Silver	King James Reyes	Athletics	Men's 5000m T46	4 June
12	Silver	Henry Roger Lopez; Jasper Rom; Sander Severino	Chess	Men's team rapid PI	4 June
13	Silver	King James Reyes	Athletics	Men's 1500m T46	5 June
14	Silver	Marites Burce	Athletics	Women's javelin throw F54	5 June
15	Silver	Jesebel Tordecilla	Athletics	Women's javelin throw F55	5 June
16	Silver	Jolan Camacho	Athletics	Men's long jump T11–12	5 June
17	Silver	Ariel Alegarbes	Swimming	Men's 100m butterfly SB14	6 June
18	Silver	Arvin Arreglado	Athletics	Men's triple jump T47	6 June
19	Silver	Arman Dino	Athletics	Men's 400m T47	6 June
20	Silver	Benedicto Gaela; Linard Sultan	Table tennis	Men's doubles TT9	6 June
21	Silver	Maekel Lita	Athletics	Men's discus throw F56	7 June
22	Silver	Andrei Kuizon	Athletics	Men's javelin throw F34–54	7 June
23	Silver	Jesebel Tordecilla	Athletics	Women's discus throw F55	7 June
24	Silver	Francis Ching	Chess	Men's individual standard VI–B1	7 June
25	Silver	Henry Roger Lopez; Jasper Rom; Sander Severino	Chess	Men's team standard PI	7 June
26	Silver	Gary Bejino	Swimming	Men's 50m butterfly S6	7 June
27	Silver	Ernie Gawilan	Swimming	Men's butterfly S7	7 June
28	Silver	Gary Bejino	Swimming	Men's 50m freestyle S6	7 June
29	Silver	Mark Vincent Aguilar; Alfie Cabañog; Jannil Cañete; Kyle Carlo Carandang; John Rey Escalante; Moises Escobar; Jefferson Legacion; Rene Macabenguil; Freddie Magdayo; Marlon Nacita; Kenneth Christopher Tapia; Cleford Trocino	Wheelchair basketball	Men's 5x5 tournament	7 June
30	Silver	Arman Subaste	Chess	Men's individual blitz VI–B2/B3	8 June
31	Silver	Marco Tinamisan	Swimming	Men's 100m freestyle S4	8 June
32	Silver	Gary Bejino	Swimming	Men's 100m freestyle S6	8 June
33	Silver	Ariel Alegarbes	Swimming	Men's 100m freestyle S14	8 June

=== Bronze ===
No.	Medal	Name	Sport	Event	Date
1	Bronze	Roland Sabido	Swimming	Men's 400m freestyle S9	4 June
2	Bronze	Marites Burce	Athletics	Women's women's shot put F54	4 June
3	Bronze	Jesebel Tordecilla	Athletics	Women's women's shot put F55	4 June
4	Bronze	Beariza Roble	Swimming	Women's 400m freestyle S6	4 June
5	Bronze	Ravinia Carpena	Athletics	Women's shot put F20	4 June
6	Bronze	Mary Ann Taguinod	Judo	Women's –57 kg J2	4 June
7	Bronze	Christian Berlarmino	Judo	Men's –60 kg J1	4 June
8	Bronze	Muhaimin Ulag	Swimming	Men's 100m breaststroke SB9	4 June
9	Bronze	Cecilio Bilog; Francis Ching; Rodolfo Sarmiento	Chess	Men's team rapid VI–B1	4 June
10	Bronze	Henry Roger Lopez	Chess	Men's individual rapid PI	4 June
11	Bronze	Menandro Redor	Chess	Men's individual rapid VI–B2/B3	4 June
12	Bronze	Evangeline Gamao; Katrina Mangawang; Elena Peligro	Chess	Women's team rapid VI–B1	4 June
13	Bronze	Jerome Doria Fernandez	Athletics	Men's 100m T46	5 June
14	Bronze	Arvie Arreglado	Athletics	Men's 100m T47	5 June
15	Bronze	Ernie Gawilan	Swimming	Men's 100m backstroke S7	5 June
16	Bronze	Smith Billy Cartera; Racleo Martinez Jr.	Table tennis	Men's team TT4	5 June
17	Bronze	Jobert Lumanta; Leo Macalanda; Jayson Ocampo	Table tennis	Men's team TT8	5 June
18	Bronze	Lucena Jaranilla; Darwin Salvacion	Table tennis	Mixed doubles T5	6 June
19	Bronze	Maekel Lita	Athletics	Men's javelin throw F56	6 June
20	Bronze	Carlito Agustin Jr. Christian Berlarmino; Deterson Omas	Judo	Men's team	6 June
21	Bronze	Jerome Doria Fernandez	Athletics	Men's 400m T46	6 June
22	Bronze	Rosalie Torrefiel	Athletics	Women's discus throw F11	6 June
23	Bronze	Smith Billy Cartera; Racleo Martinez Jr.	Table tennis	Men's doubles TT4	6 June
24	Bronze	Leo Macalanda; Jhona Peña	Table tennis	Mixed doubles T6–7	6 June
25	Bronze	Andrew Kevin Arandia; Mary Eloise Sable	Table tennis	Mixed doubles TT10	6 June
26	Bronze	Minnie Carag; Mary Eloise Sable	Table tennis	Women's doubles TT10	6 June
27	Bronze	Jhona Peña; Angela Querubin	Table tennis	Women's doubles TT9	6 June
28	Bronze	Jerome Doria Fernandez	Athletics	Men's 200m T46	7 June
29	Bronze	Arman Dino	Athletics	Men's 200m T47	7 June
30	Bronze	Cendy Asusano	Athletics	Women's discus throw F54	7 June
31	Bronze	Henry Roger Lopez	Chess	Men's individual standard PI	7 June
32	Bronze	Arman Subaste	Chess	Men's individual standard VI–B2/B3	7 June
33	Bronze	Anthony Abogado; Cecilio Bilog; Francis Ching	Chess	Men's team standard VI–B1	7 June
34	Bronze	Cheryl Angot	Chess	Women's individual standard PI	7 June
35	Bronze	Evangeline Gamao; Katrina Mangawang; Elena Peligro	Chess	Women's team standard VI–B1	7 June
36	Bronze	Adeline Dumapong	Powerlifting	Women's +86 kg – Best lift	7 June
37	Bronze	Adeline Dumapong	Powerlifting	Women's +86 kg – Total lift	7 June
38	Bronze	Marco Tinamisan	Swimming	Men's 50 freestyle S4	7 June
39	Bronze	Claire Calizo	Swimming	Women's 200m freestyle S14	7 June
40	Bronze	Paz Enano Lita; Gloria Grace Nadawa	Badminton	Women's doubles WH1–WH2	8 June
41	Bronze	Paz Enano Lita	Badminton	Women's singles WH2	8 June
42	Bronze	Felix Aguilera	Chess	Men's individual blitz PI	8 June
43	Bronze	Francis Ching	Chess	Men's individual blitz VI–B1	8 June
44	Bronze	Menandro Redor	Chess	Men's individual blitz VI–B2/B3	8 June
45	Bronze	Cecilio Bilog; Francis Ching	Chess	Men's team blitz VI–B1	8 June
46	Bronze	Cheryl Angot	Chess	Women's individual blitz PI	8 June
47	Bronze	Evangeline Gamao; Katrina Magawang	Chess	Women's team blitz VI–B1	8 June
48	Bronze	Pablo Catalan	Table tennis	Men's singles TT10	8 June
49	Bronze	Linard Sultan	Table tennis	Men's singles TT9	8 June

=== Demonstration sport ===
Earned medal in a demonstration sport is not counted in the Medal Haul

No.	Medal	Name	Sport	Event	Date
1	Gold	Jasper Ambat; Joshua Detera; Mike Ace Chester Gonzales; Ashly Josh Paghubasan; Marvin Angelo Rañon	Esports	Men's Mobile Legends	5 June

== Multiple medalists ==
Name	Sport	Gold	Silver	Bronze	Total
Darry Bernardo	Chess	6	0	0	6
Cheyzer Mendoza	Chess	5	1	0	6
Angel Otom	Swimming	4	0	0	4
Ariel Alegarbes	Swimming	2	3	0	5
Gary Bejino	Swimming	2	3	0	5
Sander Severino	Chess	2	3	0	5
Ernie Gawilan	Swimming	2	2	1	5
Cheryl Angot	Chess	2	1	2	5
Arman Subaste	Chess	2	1	1	4
Menandro Redor	Chess	2	0	2	4
Cendy Asusano	Athletics	2	0	1	3
Evaristo Carbonel	Athletics	2	0	0	2
Andrei Kuizon	Athletics	2	0	0	2
Jerrold Mangliwan	Athletics	2	0	0	2
King James Reyes	Athletics	1	2	0	3
Jesebel Tordecilla	Athletics	1	1	1	3
Marydol Pamati-an	Powerlifting	1	1	0	2
Felix Aguilera	Chess	1	0	1	2
Rosalie Torrefiel	Athletics	1	0	1	2
Henry Roger Lopez	Chess	0	2	2	4
Arvie Arreglado	Athletics	0	2	1	3
Marco Tinamisan	Swimming	0	2	1	3
Alfie Cabañog	Wheelchair Basketball	0	2	0	2
John Rey Escalante	Wheelchair Basketball	0	2	0	2
Achelle Guion	Powerlifting	0	2	0	2
Rene Macabenguil	Wheelchair Basketball	0	2	0	2
Kenneth Christopher Tapia	Wheelchair Basketball	0	2	0	2
Cleford Trocino	Wheelchair Basketball	0	2	0	2
Francis Ching	Chess	0	1	4	5
Marites Burce	Athletics	0	1	1	2
Arman Dino	Athletics	0	1	1	2
Maekel Lita	Athletics	0	1	1	2
Deterson Omas	Judo	0	1	1	2
Linard Sultan	Table tennis	0	1	1	2
Jerome Doria Fernandez	Athletics	0	0	3	3
Evagenline Gamao	Chess	0	0	3	3
Maria Katrina Mangawang	Chess	0	0	3	3
Christian Belarmino	Judo	0	0	2	2
Cecilio Bilog	Chess	0	0	2	2
Smith Billy Cartera	Table tennis	0	0	2	2
Adeline Dumapong	Powerlifting	0	0	2	2
Paz Enano Lita	Badminton	0	0	2	2
Racleo Martinez Jr.	Table tennis	0	0	2	2
Mary Eloise Sable	Table tennis	0	0	2	2

== Medal summary ==
=== By sport ===
Medals by sport
Sport	1st place, gold medalist(s)	2nd place, silver medalist(s)	3rd place, bronze medalist(s)	Total	Rank
Chess	13	7	15	35	2
Athletics	10	10	11	31	6
Swimming	10	9	6	25	6
Powerlifting	1	3	2	6	6
Wheelchair basketball	0	2	0	2	3
Table tennis	0	1	10	11	5
Judo	0	1	3	4	5
Badminton	0	0	2	2	5
Total	34	33	49	116	5

=== Demonstration Sport ===
Medals by sport
Sport	1st place, gold medalist(s)	2nd place, silver medalist(s)	3rd place, bronze medalist(s)	Total	Rank
Esports	1	0	0	1	1
Total	1	0	0	1	1

=== By date ===
Day	Date	1st place, gold medalist(s)	2nd place, silver medalist(s)	3rd place, bronze medalist(s)	Total
1	3 June	0	1	0	1
2	4 June	9	10	12	31
3	5 June	4	5	5	14
4	6 June	6	4	10	20
5	7 June	10	9	12	30
6	8 June	6	4	10	20
Total		34	33	49	116

== Athletics ==
=== Men's ===
Track & road events

Athlete	Event	Class	Heats			Final	
Athlete	Event	Class	Heat	Time	Rank	Time	Rank
Jerome Doria Fernandez	100m	T46	—N/a			12.11	3rd place, bronze medalist(s)
Arvie Arreglado	100m	T47	—N/a			11.35	3rd place, bronze medalist(s)
Arman Dino	100m	T47	—N/a			11.71	4
Jolan Camacho	200m	T12	—N/a			DNS	—N/a
Jerome Doria Fernandez	200m	T46	—N/a			24.43	3rd place, bronze medalist(s)
Arvie Arreglado	200m	T47	—N/a			DNS	—N/a
Arman Dino	200m	T47	—N/a			23.55	3rd place, bronze medalist(s)
Jerrold Mangliwan	200m	T52	—N/a			32.99	1st place, gold medalist(s)
Rodrigo Podiotan Jr.	200m	T52	—N/a			34.58	3
Jolan Camacho	400m	T12	2	DNF	—N/a	Did not advance	
Ronn-Russel Mitra	400m	T20	2	52.86	3Q	52.60	7
Anthony Peralta	400m	T20	1	52.98	4Q	52.28	6
Jerome Doria Fernandez	400m	T46	—N/a			54.51	3rd place, bronze medalist(s)
Arman Dino	400m	T47	—N/a			52.96	2nd place, silver medalist(s)
Jerrold Mangliwan	400m	T52	—N/a			1:01.93	1st place, gold medalist(s)
Rodrigo Podiotan Jr.	400m	T52	—N/a			1:03.65	3
Daniel Enderes Jr.	800m	T20	—N/a			2:12.10	6
Anthony Peralta	800m	T20	—N/a			2:30.24	8
King James Reyes	800m	T46	—N/a			2:13.22	1st place, gold medalist(s)
Daniel Enderes Jr.	1500m	T20	—N/a			4:28.26	5
King James Reyes	1500m	T46	—N/a			4:24.85	2nd place, silver medalist(s)
Daniel Enderes Jr.	5000m	T20	—N/a			18:35.20	4
King James Reyes	5000m	T46	—N/a			18.50.16	2nd place, silver medalist(s)

Field events

Athlete	Event	Class	Final	
Athlete	Event	Class	Distance	Position
Evaristo Carbonel	Discus throw	F11	25.67	1st place, gold medalist(s)
Joel Balatucan	Discus throw	F55	24.13	4
Maekel Lita	Discus throw	F56	24.25	2nd place, silver medalist(s)
Andy Avellana	High jump	T42–44	1.45	8
Evaristo Carbonel	Javelin throw	F11	23.98	1st place, gold medalist(s)
Andrei Kuizon	Javelin throw	F54	19.03	1st place, gold medalist(s)
Joel Balatucan	Javelin throw	F55	22.05	4
Maekel Lita	Javelin throw	F56	19.37	3rd place, bronze medalist(s)
Jolan Camacho	Long jump	T11–12	5.75	2nd place, silver medalist(s)
Ronn-Russel Mitra	Long jump	T20	6.24	5
Andy Avellana	Long jump	T42–44	3.22	6
Arvie Arreglado	Long jump	T47	5.70	2nd place, silver medalist(s)
Andrei Kuizon	Shot put	F54	7.27	1st place, gold medalist(s)
Joel Balatucan	Shot put	F55	7.55	5
Maekel Lita	Shot put	F56	7.38	4
Arvie Arreglado	Triple jump	T47	11.81	2nd place, silver medalist(s)

=== Women's ===
Track & road events

Athlete	Event	Class	Final	
Athlete	Event	Class	Time	Rank
Prudencia Panaligan	200m	T54	35.37	4
Remie Rose Flores	400m	T20	1:11.41	5
Remie Rose Flores	800m	T20	2:55.51	5
Remie Rose Flores	1500m	T20	6:02.99	4

Field events

Athlete	Event	Class	Final	
Athlete	Event	Class	Distance	Position
Jeanette Aceveda	Discus throw	F11	16.28	6
Rosalie Torrefiel	Discus throw	F11	19.57	3rd place, bronze medalist(s)
Cendy Asusano	Discus throw	F54	13.46	3rd place, bronze medalist(s)
Marites Burce	Discus throw	F54	13.06	4
Jesebel Tordecilla	Discus throw	F55	14.42	2nd place, silver medalist(s)
Jeanette Acevena	Javelin throw	F11	12.69	6
Rosalie Torrefiel	Javelin throw	F11	19.33	1st place, gold medalist(s)
Cendy Asusano	Javelin throw	F54	13.74	1st place, gold medalist(s)
Marites Burce	Javelin throw	F54	11.96	2nd place, silver medalist(s)
Jesebel Tordecilla	Javelin throw	F55	13.62	2nd place, silver medalist(s)
Jeanette Aceveda	Shot put	F11	5.97	4
Rosalie Torrefiel	Shot put	F11	5.94	5
Ravinia Carpena	Shot put	F20	9.37	3rd place, bronze medalist(s)
Cendy Asusano	Shot put	F54	5.77	1st place, gold medalist(s)
Marites Burce	Shot put	F54	4.84	3rd place, bronze medalist(s)
Jesebel Tordecilla	Shot put	F55	5.45	3rd place, bronze medalist(s)

== Badminton ==
=== Men's ===
Athlete	Event	Class	Group Stage				Quarterfinals	Semifinals	Final	
Athlete	Event	Class	Opposition Score	Opposition Score	Opposition Score	Rank	Opposition Score	Opposition Score	Opposition Score	Rank
Joseph Asoque	Singles	SL3	Suy (CAM); L 0–2	Nurjaman (INA); L 0–2; WO	—N/a	3	Did not advance			
Basil Hermogenes	Singles	SL3	Trịnh (VIE); L 0–2	Bunsun (THA); L 0–2	—N/a	3	Did not advance			
Antonio dela Cruz Jr.	Singles	SU5	Choa (CAM); W 2–0	Putra (INA); L 0–2	Azri (MAS); L 0–2	3	Did not advance			
Antonio dela Cruz Jr. Basil Hermogenes	Doubles	SU5	Chee; Wei (SGP); L 0–2	Nugroho; Putra (INA); L 0–2	Burhanuddin; Sibi (MAS); L 0–2	4	Did not advance			

=== Women's ===
Athlete	Event	Class	Group Stage					Semifinals	Final	
Athlete	Event	Class	Opposition Score	Opposition Score	Opposition Score	Opposition Score	Rank	Opposition Score	Opposition Score	Rank
Ardinia Bermudez	Singles	SH6	Saeyang (THA); L 0–2	Irianti (INA); L 0–2	Marlina (INA); L 0–2	—N/a	4	Did not advance		
Cielo Honasan	Singles	SL4	Srinavakul (THA); L 0–2	Priyanti (INA); L 0–2	Sadiyah (INA); L 0–2	—N/a	4	Did not advance		
Marie Concepcion	Singles	WH1	Nadawa (PHI); L 0–2	Pinchai (THA); L 0–2	Pookkham (THA); L 0–2	Thinjun (THA); L 0–2	4	Did not advance		
Gloria Grace Nadawa	Singles	WH1	Concepcion (PHI); W 2–0	Thinjun (THA); L 0–2	Pinchai (THA); L 0–2	Pookkham (THA); L 0–2	3	Did not advance		
Imelda Legazpi	Singles	WH2	Hoàng (VIE); L 0–2	Wetwithan (THA); L 0–2	—N/a		3	Did not advance		
Paz Enano Lita	Singles	WH2	Lê (VIE); L 1–2	Yi (CAM); W 2–0	—N/a		2	Wetwithan (THA); L 0–2	Did not advance	3rd place, bronze medalist(s)
Marie Concepcion; Imelda Legazpi	Doubles	WH1–WH2	Lita; Nadawa (PHI); L 0–2	Pookkham; Wetwithan (THA); L 0–2	Pinchai; Thinjun (THA); L 0–2	—N/a	4	—N/a		
Paz Enano Lita; Gloria Grace Nadawa	Doubles	WH1–WH2	Concepcion; Legazpi (PHI); W 2–0	Pinchai; Thinjun (THA); L 0–2	Pookkham; Wetwithan (THA); L 0–2	—N/a	—N/a			3rd place, bronze medalist(s)

=== Mixed doubles ===
Athlete	Class	Group Stage				Semifinals	Final	
Athlete	Class	Opposition Score	Opposition Score	Opposition Score	Rank	Opposition Score	Opposition Score	Rank
Basil Hermogenes; Cielo Honasan	SL3–SU5	Oktila; Ramdani (INA); L 0–2	Saensupa; Teamarrom (THA); L 0–2	—N/a	3	Did not advance		

== Boccia ==
=== Men's ===
Athlete	Event	Class	Group Stage				Semifinals	Final / BM	
Athlete	Event	Class	Opposition Score	Opposition Score	Opposition Score	Rank	Opposition Score	Opposition Score	Rank
Joey Eriga de Leon	Individual	BC1	Khaoon (LAO); L 3–6	Appurusamy (MAS); W 7–1	Huadpradit (THA); L 2–7	4	Syafa (INA); L 0–15	Thepdaeng (THA); L 2–4	4
John Quintana	Individual	BC1	Syafa (INA); L 1–6	Thepdaeng (THA); L 1–8	Honseng (MAS); W 5–2	3	Did not advance		
David Gonzaga	Individual	BC2	Saengampa (THA); L 0–14	Yudha (INA); L 0–16	Sokchy (CAM); L 3–6	4	Did not advance		
John Loyd Villaroya	Individual	BC2	Vongsa (THA); L 0–9	Noh (MAS); L 1–13	Lee (LAO); L 1–5	4	Did not advance		
Ramon Apilado	Individual	BC4	Larpyen (THA); L 0–10	Sugiarta (INA); L 2–12	Pamungkas (INA); L 4–5	4	Did not advance		

=== Women's ===
Athlete	Event	Class	Group Stage				Semifinals	Final / BM	
Athlete	Event	Class	Opposition Score	Opposition Score	Opposition Score	Rank	Opposition Score	Opposition Score	Rank
Daniella Catacutan	Individual	BC2	N U Nguyễn (VIE); L 0–7	Channy (CAM); W 5–1	Zayana (INA); L 4–8	3	Did not advance		
Michelle Fernandez	Individual	BC4	Sary (CAM); W 6–0	Khiawjantra (THA); L 1–8	—N/a	2	Salim (MAS); L 1–6	Phonsila (THA); L 0–14	4

=== Mixed ===
Athlete	Event	Class	Group Stage					Semifinals	Final / BM	
Athlete	Event	Class	Opposition Score	Opposition Score	Opposition Score	Opposition Score	Rank	Opposition Score	Opposition Score	Rank
Ramon Apilado; Michelle Fernandez	Pair	BC4	Purbawati; Sugiarta (INA); L 4–5	Phonsila; Somsanuk (THA); L 2–9	Rahman; Salim (MAS); L 1–10	Nak; Sary (CAM); L 0–13	5	Did not advance		
Daniella Catacutan; Joey Eriga de Leon; David Gonzaga	Team	BC1–2	Malaysia (MAS); W 6–4	Indonesia (INA); L 1–18	—N/a		2	Thailand (THA); L 0–28	Cambodia (CAM); L 3–6	4

== Chess ==
=== Men's ===
Athlete	Event	Class	Group Stage						
Athlete	Event	Class	Round 1	Round 2	Round 3	Round 4	Round 5	Round 6	Rank
Henry Roger Lopez	Individual rapid	PI	Dương (VIE); W 1–0	Tirto (INA); D 0.5–0.5	Dien (INA); W 1–0	Rom (PHI); W 1–0	Severino (PHI); L 0–1	V Q Nguyễn (VIE); W 1–0	3rd place, bronze medalist(s)
Jasper Rom	Individual rapid	PI	de Araujo (TLS); W 1–0	V Q Nguyễn (VIE); W 1–0	Severino (PHI); L 0–1	Lopez (PHI); L 0–1	Khoonmee (THA); W 1–0	A Tuấn Nguyễn (VIE); L 0–1	10
Sander Severino	Individual rapid	PI	Nizam (MAS); W 1–0	Dien (INA); W 1–0	Rom (PHI); W 1–0	Firdaus (INA); D 0.5–0.5	Lopez (PHI); W 1–0	Tirto (INA); L 0–1	2nd place, silver medalist(s)
Cecilio Bilog	Individual rapid	VI-B1	Fitryanto (INA); D 0.5–0.5	Lê (VIE); L 0–1	Than (MYA); W 1–0	Ching (PHI); L 0–1	Saenpoch (THA); L 0–1	do Rego (TLS); W 1–0	13
Francis Ching	Individual rapid	VI-B1	Norhayalim (MAS); W 1–0	Sopiyan (INA); D 0.5–0.5	Kaung (MYA); L 0–1	Bilog (PHI); W 1–0	Fitryanto (INA); L 0–1	Myo (MYA); W 1–0	7
Rodolfo Sarmiento	Individual rapid	VI-B1	do Rego (TLS); W 1–0	Kaung (MYA); L 0–1	Chimyam (THA); W 1–0	Sopiyan (INA); L 0–1	Johari (MAS); W 1–0	Lê (VIE); L 0–1	10
Darry Bernardo	Individual rapid	VI-B2/B3	Peligro (PHI); W 1–0	Maw (MYA); W 1–0	Redor (PHI); W 1–0	Satrio (INA); W 1–0	Jumadi (INA); W 1–0	Phạm (VIE); W 1–0	1st place, gold medalist(s)
Israel Peligro	Individual rapid	VI-B2/B3	Bernardo (PHI); L 0–1	Lai (MAS); W 1–0	Trình (VIE); L 0–1	Hartono (INA); D 0.5–0.5	Hla (MYA); W 1–0	Ang (MAS); D 0.5–0.5	10
Menandro Redor	Individual rapid	VI-B2/B3	Trình (VIE); W 1–0	Hartono (INA); W 1–0	Bernardo (PHI); L 0–1	Ang (MAS); W 1–0	Satrio (INA); L 0–1	Jumadi (INA); D 0.5–0.5	3rd place, bronze medalist(s)
Henry Roger Lopez	Individual standard	PI	Khoonmee (THA); W 1–0	Thassanamethin (THA); D 0.5–0.5	Đường (VIE); W 1–0	Dien (INA); D 0.5–0.5	Tirto (INA); D 0.5–0.5	Nizam (MAS); W 1–0	3rd place, bronze medalist(s)
Jasper Rom	Individual standard	PI	Firdaus (INA); L 0–1	Severino (PHI); L 0–1	Channtha (CAM); W 1–0	Khoonmee (THA); W 1–0	Muming (MAS); W 1–0	A Tuấn Nguyễn (VIE); W 1–0	4
Sander Severino	Individual standard	PI	Dien (INA); D 0.5–0.5	Rom (PHI); W 1–0	A Tuấn Nguyễn (VIE); W 1–0	Tirto (INA); L 0–1	Firdaus (INA); L 0–1	Thassanamethin (THA); W 1–0	7
Anthony Abogado	Individual standard	VI-B1	Johari (MAS); W 1–0	Fitryanto (INA); L 0–1	Saenpoch (THA); D 0.5–0.5	Ching (PHI); L 0–1	Myo (MYA); W 1–0	Norhayalim (MAS); L 0–1	11
Cecilio Bilog	Individual standard	VI-B1	Fitryanto (INA); L 0–1	do Rego (TLS); W 1–0	Ching (PHI); L 0–1	Johari (MAS); D 0.5–0.5	Yoga (INA); L 0–1	Sriraksa (THA); D 0.5–0.5	16
Francis Ching	Individual standard	VI-B1	Chimyam (THA); W 1–0	Đào (VIE); L 0–1	Bilog (PHI); W 1–0	Abogado (PHI); W 1–0	Fitryanto (INA); W 1–0	Kaung (MYA); D 0.5–0.5	2nd place, silver medalist(s)
Darry Bernardo	Individual standard	VI-B2/B3	Trình (VIE); W 1–0	Subaste (PHI); W 1–0	Jumadi (INA); D 0.5–0.5	Satrio (INA); W 1–0	Maw (MYA); D 0.5–0.5	Redor (PHI); W 1–0	1st place, gold medalist(s)
Menandro Redor	Individual standard	VI-B2/B3	Maw (MYA); W 1–0	Ang (MAS); W 1–0	Satrio (INA); L 0–1	Phạm (VIE); W 1–0	Hartono (INA); W 1–0	Bernardo (PHI); L 0–1	6
Arman Subaste	Individual standard	VI-B2/B3	Lin (MYA); W 1–0	Bernardo (PHI); L 0–1	Lai (MAS); W 1–0	Trình (VIE); W 1–0	Jumadi (INA); D 0.5–0.5	Maw (MYA); D 0.5–0.5	3rd place, bronze medalist(s)
Felix Aguilera	Individual blitz	PI	Severino (PHI); L 0–1	Thassanamethin (THA); W 1–0	Dien (INA); W 1–0	A Tuấn Nguyễn (VIE); W 1–0	Rottina (CAM); W 1–0	Tirto (INA); D 0.5–0.5	3rd place, bronze medalist(s)
Henry Roger Lopez	Individual blitz	PI	Thassanamethin (THA); W 1–0	Dien (INA); W 1–0	V Q Nguyễn (VIE); W 1–0	Firdaus (INA); L 0–1	Severino (PHI); L 0–1	A Tuấn Nguyễn (VIE); W 1–0	4
Sander Severino	Individual blitz	PI	Aguilera (PHI); W 1–0	Tirto (INA); D 0.5–0.5	Monkoltawephun (THA); W 1–0	Khoonmee (THA); W 1–0	Lopez (PHI); W 1–0	Firdaus (INA); W 1–0	1st place, gold medalist(s)
Cecilio Bilog	Individual blitz	VI-B1	Norhayalim (MAS); W 1–0	Đào (VIE); L 0–1	Sriraksa (THA); L 0–1	Than (MYA); D 0.5–0.5	Myo (MYA); L 0–1	do Rego (TLS); W 1–0	13
Francis Ching	Individual blitz	VI-B1	Johari (MAS); W 1–0	Saenpoch (THA); W 1–0	Yoga (INA); W 1–0	Fitryanto (INA); L 0–1	Lê (VIE); L 0–1	Kaung (MYA); W 1–0	3rd place, bronze medalist(s)
Rodolfo Sarmiento	Individual blitz	VI-B1	Đinh (VIE); W 1–0	Yoga (INA); L 0–1	Saenpoch (THA); L 0–1	Johari (MAS); W 1–0	Kaung (MYA); L 0–1	Sriraksa (THA); L 0–1	15
Darry Bernardo	Individual blitz	VI-B2/B3	Maw (MYA); W 1–0	Satrio (INA); W 1–0	Jumadi (INA); W 1–0	Subaste (PHI); W 1–0	Hartono (INA); W 1–0	Redor (PHI); L 0–1	1st place, gold medalist(s)
Menandro Redor	Individual blitz	VI-B2/B3	A Tấn Nguyễn (VIE); W 1–0	Jumadi (INA); L 0–1	Phạm (VIE); W 1–0	Trình (VIE); W 1–0	Satrio (INA); L 0–1	Bernardo (PHI); W 1–0	3rd place, bronze medalist(s)
Arman Subaste	Individual blitz	VI-B2/B3	Hla (MYA); W 1–0	Phạm (VIE); W 1–0	Lai (MAS); W 1–0	Bernardo (PHI); L 0–1	Trình (VIE); W 1–0	Hartono (INA); D 0.5–0.5	2nd place, silver medalist(s)
Henry Roger Lopez; Jasper Rom; Sander Severino	Team rapid	PI	—N/a						2nd place, silver medalist(s)
Cecilio Bilog; Francis Ching; Rodolfo Sarmiento	Team rapid	VI-B1	—N/a						3rd place, bronze medalist(s)
Darry Bernardo; Israel Peligro; Menandro Redor	Team rapid	VI-B2/B3	—N/a						1st place, gold medalist(s)
Henry Roger Lopez; Jasper Rom; Sander Severino	Team standard	PI	—N/a						2nd place, silver medalist(s)
Anthony Abogado; Cecilio Bilog; Francis Ching	Team standard	VI-B1	—N/a						3rd place, bronze medalist(s)
Darry Bernardo; Menandro Redor; Arman Subaste	Team standard	VI-B2/B3	—N/a						1st place, gold medalist(s)
Felix Aguilera; Henry Roger Lopez; Sander Severino	Team blitz	PI	—N/a						1st place, gold medalist(s)
Cecilio Bilog; Francis Ching; Rodolfo Sarmiento	Team blitz	VI-B1	—N/a						3rd place, bronze medalist(s)
Darry Bernardo; Menandro Redor; Arman Subaste	Team blitz	VI-B2/B3	—N/a						1st place, gold medalist(s)

=== Women's ===
Athlete	Event	Class	Group Stage						
Athlete	Event	Class	Round 1	Round 2	Round 3	Round 4	Round 5	Round 6	Rank
Cheryl Angot	Individual rapid	PI	Lim (MAS); L 0–1	Nacita (PHI); W 1–0	Simanja (INA); W 1–0	Yulia (INA); L 0–1	T K Nguyễn (VIE); L 0–1	Ahmad (MAS); L 0–1	8
Cheyzer Mendoza	Individual rapid	PI	T K Nguyễn (VIE); W 1–0	Ahmad (MAS); W 1–0	Đoàn (VIE); D 0.5–0.5	Simanja (INA); W 1–0	Yulia (INA); W 1–0	Lim (MAS); W 1–0	1st place, gold medalist(s)
Jean-Lee Nacita	Individual rapid	PI	Đoàn (VIE); L 0–1	Angot (PHI); L 0–1	Lim (MAS); W 1–0	Ahmad (MAS); W 1–0	Simanja (INA); L 0–1	Yuni (INA); L 0–1	9
Evangeline Gamao	Individual rapid	VI-B1	Đào (VIE); L 0–1	—N/a	Halawa (INA); W 1–0	Puspita (INA); L 0–1	Mangawang (PHI); L 0–1	Sarnoh (MAS); L 0–1	9
Maria Katrina Mangawang	Individual rapid	VI-B1	Trần (VIE); L 0–1	Sarnoh (MAS); W 1–0	Peligro (PHI); W 1–0	Đào (VIE); L 0–1	Gamao (PHI); W 1–0	Phạm (VIE); L 0–1	6
Elena Peligro	Individual rapid	VI-B1	Sinaga (INA); L 0–1	Halawa (INA); L 0–1	Mangawang (PHI); L 0–1	—N/a	Sarnoh (MAS); L 0–1	Saharuddin (MAS); W 1–0	10
Teresa Bilog	Individual rapid	VI-B2/B3	Thoo (MAS); W 1–0	Brahmana (INA); L 0–1	Khuijanthuek (THA); W 1–0	Siripatvanich (THA); W 1–0	Lucero (PHI); W 1–0	Budiarti (INA); D 0.5–0.5	2nd place, silver medalist(s)
Corazon Lucero	Individual rapid	VI-B2/B3	Khuijanthuek (THA); L 0–1	Siripatvanich (THA); L 0–1	—N/a	T M T Nguyễn (VIE); W 1–0	Bilog (PHI); L 0–1	Botkate (THA); L 0–1	12
Charmaine Tonic	Individual rapid	VI-B2/B3	T M L Nguyễn (VIE); L 0–1	Thoo (MAS); L 0–1	Siripatvanich (THA); L 0–1	—N/a	T M T Nguyễn (VIE); L 0–1	Khuijanthuek (THA); L 0–1	13
Cheryl Angot	Individual standard	PI	Simanja (INA); D 0.5–0.5	Yuni (INA); L 0–1	Mangayayam (PHI); W 1–0	Mendoza (PHI); L 0–1	Đoàn (VIE); D 0.5–0.5	Yulia (INA); W 1–0	3rd place, bronze medalist(s)
Fe Mangayayam	Individual standard	PI	Ahmad (MAS); W 1–0	Đoàn (VIE); L 0–1	Angot (PHI); L 0–1	T K Nguyễn (VIE); W 1–0	Yulia (INA); L 0–1	Lim (MAS); L 0–1	8
Cheyzer Mendoza	Individual standard	PI	Yulia (INA); W 1–0	T K Nguyễn (VIE); W 1–0	Đoàn (VIE); W 1–0	Angot (PHI); W 1–0	Simanja (INA); W 1–0	Ahmad (MAS); D 0.5–0.5	1st place, gold medalist(s)
Evangeline Gamao	Individual standard	VI-B1	Puspita (INA); L 0–1	Mangawang (PHI); L 0–1	Halawa (INA); L 0–1	—N/a	Saharuddin (MAS); W 1–0	Phạm (VIE); L 0–1	10
Katrina Mangawang	Individual standard	VI-B1	Phạm (VIE); L 0–1	Gamao (PHI); W 1–0	Peligro (PHI); W 1–0	Halawa (INA); W 1–0	Trần (VIE); L 0–1	Sarnoh (MAS); L 0–1	5
Elena Peligro	Individual standard	VI-B1	Đào (VIE); L 0–1	—N/a	Mangawang (PHI); L 0–1	Puspita (INA); L 0–1	Sarnoh (MAS); W 1–0	Saharuddin (MAS); W 1–0	9
Teresa Bilog	Individual standard	VI-B2/B3	Thoo (MAS); L 0–1	Budiarti (INA); L 0–1	—N/a	T M T Nguyễn (VIE); L 0–1	Lucero (PHI); L 0–1	Khuijanthuek (THA); W 1–0	12
Corazon Lucero	Individual standard	VI-B2/B3	T H Nguyễn (VIE); L 0–1	—N/a	T M L Nguyễn (VIE); L 0–1	Tonic (PHI); W 1–0	Bilog (PHI); W 1–0	T M T Nguyễn (VIE); W 1–0	4
Charmaine Tonic	Individual standard	VI-B2/B3	—N/a	T H Nguyễn (VIE); L 0–1	Botkate (THA); L 0–1	Lucero (PHI); L 0–1	Khuijanthuek (THA); W 1–0	Siripatvanich (THA); L 0–1	11
Cheryl Angot	Individual blitz	PI	Lim (MAS); L 0–1	Nacita (PHI); W 1–0	Yuni (INA); W 1–0	Simanja (INA); D 0.5–0.5	Mendoza (PHI); L 0–1	Đoàn (VIE); W 1–0	3rd place, bronze medalist(s)
Cheyzer Mendoza	Individual blitz	PI	Yuni (INA); W 1–0	Lim (MAS); W 1–0	Đoàn (VIE); D 0.5–0.5	Yulia (INA); W 1–0	Angot (PHI); W 1–0	T K Nguyễn (VIE); D 0.5–0.5	1st place, gold medalist(s)
Jean-Lee Nacita	Individual blitz	PI	Yulia (INA); W 1–0	Angot (PHI); L 0–1	T K Nguyễn (VIE); L 0–1	Lim (MAS); D 0.5–0.5	Simanja (INA); L 0–1	Ahmad (MAS); L 0–1	9
Evangeline Gamao	Individual blitz	VI-B1	Mangawang (PHI); L 0–1	—N/a	Saharuddin (MAS); W 1–0	Halawa (INA); W 1–0	Phạm (VIE); L 0–1	Trần (VIE); L 0–1	7
Katrina Mangawang	Individual blitz	VI-B1	Gamao (PHI); W 1–0	Trần (VIE); L 0–1	Sarnoh (MAS); L 0–1	Puspita (INA); L 0–1	—N/a	Saharuddin (MAS); W 1–0	8
Elena Peligro	Individual blitz	VI-B1	Puspita (INA); W 1–0	Phạm (VIE); L 0–1	Đào (VIE); L 0–1	Saharuddin (MAS); L 0–1	Halawa (INA); L 0–1	—N/a	11
Teresa Bilog	Individual blitz	VI-B2/B3	T H Nguyễn (VIE); L 0–1	Lucero (PHI); L 0–1	—N/a	Khairunnisa (INA); L 0–1	Thoo (MAS); W 1–0	Tonic (PHI); W 1–0	10
Corazon Lucero	Individual blitz	VI-B2/B3	Khairunnisa (INA); L 0–1	Bilog (PHI); W 1–0	Budiarti (INA); L 0–1	Tonic (PHI); W 1–0	Botkate (THA); L 0–1	Khuijanthuek (THA); W 1–0	7
Charmaine Tonic	Individual blitz	VI-B2/B3	Siripatvanich (THA); L 0–1	—N/a	T M T Nguyễn (VIE); L 0–1	Lucero (PHI); L 0–1	Khuijanthuek (THA); L 0–1	Bilog (PHI); L 0–1	13
Cheryl Angot; Cheyzer Mendoza; Jen-Lee Nacita	Team rapid	PI	—N/a						2nd place, silver medalist(s)
Evangeline Gamao; Katrina Mangawang; Elena Peligro	Team rapid	VI-B1	—N/a						3rd place, bronze medalist(s)
Teresa Bilog; Corazon Lucero; Charmaine Tonic	Team rapid	VI-B2/B3	—N/a						4
Cheryl Angot; Cheyzer Mendoza; Jen-Lee Nacita	Team standard	PI	—N/a						1st place, gold medalist(s)
Evangeline Gamao; Katrina Mangawang; Elena Peligro	Team standard	VI-B1	—N/a						3rd place, bronze medalist(s)
Teresa Bilog; Corazon Lucero; Charmaine Tonic	Team standard	VI-B2/B3	—N/a						4
Cheryl Angot; Cheyzer Mendoza; Jen-Lee Nacita	Team blitz	PI	—N/a						1st place, gold medalist(s)
Evangeline Gamao; Katrina Mangawang; Elena Peligro	Team blitz	VI-B1	—N/a						3rd place, bronze medalist(s)
Teresa Bilog; Corazon Lucero; Charmaine Tonic	Team blitz	VI-B2/B3	—N/a						4

== Esports (demonstration) ==
Team	Event	Group Stage				Semifinals	Final / BM	
Team	Event	Opposition Score	Opposition Score	Opposition Score	Rank	Opposition Score	Opposition Score	Rank
Jasper Ambat; Joshua Detera; Mike Ace Chester Gonzales; Ashly Josh Paghubasan; Marvin Angelo Rañon	Men's Mobile Legends	Cambodia; W 2–0	Thailand; W 2–0	Malaysia; W 3–0	1	Thailand; W 2–0	Malaysia; W 2-0	1st place, gold medalist(s)

== Football 7-a-Side ==
Team	Event	Group Stage			Semifinals / PF	Final / BM / PF	
Team	Event	Opposition Score	Opposition Score	Rank	Opposition Score	Opposition Score	Rank
Philippines men's	Men's tournament	Thailand; L 1–13	Myanmar; L 3–12	3	Cambodia; L 2–4	Did not advance	6

== Goalball ==
Team	Event	Group Stage					Semifinals	Final / BM	
Team	Event	Opposition Score	Opposition Score	Opposition Score	Opposition Score	Rank	Opposition Score	Opposition Score	Rank
Philippines men's	Men's tournament	Indonesia; L 4–14	Malaysia; L 3–13	—N/a		3	Did not advance		
Philippines women's	Women's tournament	Indonesia; L 2–4	Thailand; L 1–11	Malaysia; L 1–11	Laos; L 5–9	5	Did not advance		

=== Men's tournament ===
==== Group B ====
Pos	Team	Pld	W	L	PF	PA	PD	Pts	Qualification
1	Indonesia (INA)	2	2	0	26	6	+20	4	Qualified for the Semifinals
2	Malaysia (MAS)	2	1	1	15	15	0	3	Qualified for the Semifinals
3	Philippines (PHI)	2	0	2	7	27	−20	2	

Source: APG 2023

5 June 2023; 11:40	Indonesia	14–4	Philippines	Morodok Techo National Stadium

6 June 2023; 13:00	Malaysia	13–3	Philippines	Morodok Techo National Stadium

=== Women's tournament ===
==== Group Stage ====
Pos	Team	Pld	W	L	PF	PA	PD	Pts	Qualification
1	Thailand (THA)	4	4	0	25	4	+21	8	Qualified for the Semifinal
2	Malaysia (MAS)	4	2	2	20	13	+7	6	Qualified for the Semifinal
3	Laos (LAO)	4	2	2	22	19	+3	6	Qualified for the Semifinal
4	Indonesia (INA)	4	2	2	8	13	−5	6	Qualified for the Semifinal
5	Philippines (PHI)	4	0	4	9	35	−26	4	

Source: APG 2023

4 June 2023; 11:40	Indonesia	4–2	Philippines	Morodok Techo National Stadium

4 June 2023; 14:20	Philippines	1–11	Thailand	Morodok Techo National Stadium

6 June 2023; 10:20	Malaysia	11–1	Philippines	Morodok Techo National Stadium

6 June 2023; 14:20	Laos	9–5	Philippines	Morodok Techo National Stadium

== Judo ==
=== Men's ===
Athlete	Event	Class	Group Stage					Quarterfinals	Semifinals	Final / BM	
Athlete	Event	Class	Opposition Score	Opposition Score	Opposition Score	Opposition Score	Rank	Opposition Score	Opposition Score	Opposition Score	Rank
Christian Belarmino	–60 kg	J1	Chey (CAM); W 100–0	Junaedi (INA); L 0–100	Kongsuk (THA); L 0–100	Võ (VIE); W 100–1	—N/a				3rd place, bronze medalist(s)
Deterson Omas	–73 kg	J1	Bi (CAM); W 100–0	Azis (INA); L 0–100	Phaibun (THA); W 100–0	Trần (VIE); W 100–0	—N/a				2nd place, silver medalist(s)
Carlito Agustin Jr.	–90 kg	J1	Pambudi (INA); L 0–100	Lee (MAS); L 0–100	Chaisin (THA); L 0–100	Huỳnh (VIE); L 0–100	5	—N/a			
Carlito Agustin Jr. Christian Belarmino; Deterson Omas	Team	—N/a						Vietnam (VIE); L 1–2	Did not advance	Malaysia (MAS); W 2–0	3rd place, bronze medalist(s)

=== Women's ===
Athlete	Event	Class	Group Stage			
Athlete	Event	Class	Opposition Score	Opposition Score	Opposition Score	Rank
Mary Ann Taguinod	–57 kg	J2	Fadilah (INA); L 0–100	Sihotang (INA); L 0–100	T H T Nguyễn (VIE); W 100–0	3rd place, bronze medalist(s)

== Powerlifting ==
=== Men's ===
Athlete	Event	Best lift	Rank	Total	Rank
Jules Empizo	49 kg	85	6	160	5
Romeo Tayawa	54 kg	118	4	233	4
Gregorio Payat	59 kg	120	5	235	6
Carlo John Nuyda	88 kg	85	4	160	4
Jeremy Jaramillo	97 kg	100	4	190	4

=== Women's ===
Athlete	Event	Best lift	Rank	Total	Rank
Marydol Pamati-an	41 kg	75	2nd place, silver medalist(s)	216	1st place, gold medalist(s)
Achelle Guion	45 kg	79	2nd place, silver medalist(s)	224	2nd place, silver medalist(s)
Rose Ann Lita	50 kg	45	4	45	4
Denesia Esnara	55 kg	NMR	—N/a	NMR	—N/a
Cherrylyn Sugue	67 kg	60	4	60	4
Adeline Dumapong	+86 kg	105	3rd place, bronze medalist(s)	285	3rd place, bronze medalist(s)

== Sitting volleyball ==
Team	Event	Preliminary round					Semifinals	Final / BM
Team	Event	Opposition Score	Opposition Score	Opposition Score	Opposition Score	Rank	Opposition Score	Opposition Score
Philippines men's	Men's tournament	Thailand; L 0–3; 6–25, 9–25, 10–25	Cambodia; L 0–3; 15–25, 13–25, 16–25	Indonesia; L 0–3; 15–25, 16–25, 10–25	Myanmar; L 0–3; 15–25, 12–25, 22–25	5	Did not advance	

== Swimming ==
=== Men's ===
Athlete	Event	Final	
Athlete	Event	Time	Rank
Arnel Aba	50 butterfly S9	34.71	10
Arnel Aba	50 freestyle S9	33.12	8
Arnel Aba	100 butterfly S9	1:32.61	6
Arnel Aba	200 individual medley SM9	3:01.65	6
Arnel Aba	400 freestyle S9	5:26.96	5
Ariel Alegarbes	50 butterfly S14	26.69	1st place, gold medalist(s)
Ariel Alegarbes	50 freestyle S14	25.39	2nd place, silver medalist(s)
Ariel Alegarbes	100 breaststroke SB14	1:13.59	2nd place, silver medalist(s)
Ariel Alegarbes	100 butterfly S14	1:00.73	2nd place, silver medalist(s)
Ariel Alegarbes	200 individual medley SM14	2:18.19	1st place, gold medalist(s)
Adrian Azul	50 breaststroke SB14	40.47	6
Adrian Azul	50 butterfly S14	29.16	6
Adrian Azul	50 freestyle S14	27.29	7
Adrian Azul	100 freestyle S14	1:01.76	7
Gary Bejino	50 butterfly S6	35.43	2nd place, silver medalist(s)
Gary Bejino	50 freestyle S6	33.49	2nd place, silver medalist(s)
Gary Bejino	100 freestyle S6	1:15.09	2nd place, silver medalist(s)
Gary Bejino	200 freestyle S6	2:38.55	1st place, gold medalist(s)
Gary Bejino	400 freestyle S6	5:38.26	1st place, gold medalist(s)
Ernie Gawilan	50 butterfly S7	34.72	2nd place, silver medalist(s)
Ernie Gawilan	100 backstroke S7	1:21.77	3rd place, bronze medalist(s)
Ernie Gawilan	100 freestyle S7	1:07.42	2nd place, silver medalist(s)
Ernie Gawilan	200 individual medley SM7	2:50.29	1st place, gold medalist(s)
Ernie Gawilan	400 freestyle S7	4:58.78	1st place, gold medalist(s)
Roland Sabido	50 butterfly S9	33.73	9
Roland Sabido	100 backstroke S9	1:15.32	4
Roland Sabido	100 freestyle S9	1:08.61	7
Roland Sabido	200 individual medley SM9	3:02.86	8
Roland Sabido	400 freestyle S9	5:10.65	3rd place, bronze medalist(s)
Marco Tinamisan	50 backstroke S4	1:37.18	6
Marco Tinamisan	50 butterfly S5	DNS	—N/a
Marco Tinamisan	50 freestyle S4	49.84	3rd place, bronze medalist(s)
Marco Tinamisan	100 freestyle S4	1:47.45	2nd place, silver medalist(s)
Marco Tinamisan	200 freestyle S4	4:00.17	4
Muhaimin Ulag	50 butterfly S9	37.08	13
Muhaimin Ulag	50 freestyle S9	31.77	7
Muhaimin Ulag	100 breaststroke SB9	1:22.18	3rd place, bronze medalist(s)
Muhaimin Ulag	100 freestyle S9	1:11.71	10
Muhaimin Ulag	200 individual medley SM9	3:02.77	7
Edwin Villanueva	50 breaststroke SB7	44.50	3
Edwin Villanueva	50 butterfly S8	37.86	7
Edwin Villanueva	100 breaststroke SB7	1:45.96	4
Edwin Villanueva	200 individual medley SM8	3:15.18	7
Edwin Villanueva	400 freestyle S8	6:20.65	5
Arnel Aba; Ernie Gawilan; Roland Sabido; Muhaimin Ulag	4x100 freestyle relay 34 points	4:39.48	5
Arnel Aba; Ernie Gawilan; Roland Sabido; Muhaimin Ulag	4x100 medley relay 34 points	5:08.85	5
	4x50 freestyle relay 20 points	DQ	3rd place, bronze medalist(s)

=== Women's ===
Athlete	Event	Final	
Athlete	Event	Time	Rank
Claire Calizo	50 backstroke S14	41.81	4
Claire Calizo	50 butterfly S14	39.35	4
Claire Calizo	100 backstroke S14	1:31.88	4
Claire Calizo	200 freestyle S14	2:42.45	3rd place, bronze medalist(s)
Claire Calizo	200 individual medley SM14	3:12.63	5
Angel Otom	50 backstroke S5	42.63	1st place, gold medalist(s)
Angel Otom	50 butterfly S5	47.33	1st place, gold medalist(s)
Angel Otom	50 freestyle S5	42.22	1st place, gold medalist(s)
Angel Otom	200 freestyle S5	3:48.72	2
Angel Otom	200 individual medley SM5	4:43.60	1st place, gold medalist(s)
Beariza Roble	50 butterfly S6	1:07.22	5
Beariza Roble	50 freestyle S6	48.02	4
Beariza Roble	100 freestyle S6	1:44.09	4
Beariza Roble	400 freestyle S6	7:51.80	3rd place, bronze medalist(s)

== Table tennis ==
=== Men's ===
Athlete	Event	Class	Group Stage					Quarterfinals	Semifinals	Final	
Athlete	Event	Class	Opposition Score	Opposition Score	Opposition Score	Opposition Score	Rank	Opposition Score	Opposition Score	Opposition Score	Rank
Manuel Repato	Singles	TT2	Ngangi (INA); L 0–3	Chueawong (THA); L 0–3	Thinathet (THA); L 0–3	Li (SGP); L – 0–3	5	—N/a			
Darwin Salvacion	Singles	TT3	Sefrianto (INA); L 1–3	Nuch (CAM); L 0–3	Laowong (THA); L 0–3	—N/a	4	Did not advance			
Smith Billy Cartera	Singles	TT4	Sopheap (CAM); W 3–1	Astan (INA); L 1–3	Pateh (THA); L 2–3	—N/a	3	Did not advance			
Racleo Martinez Jr.	Singles	TT4	Harnpichai (THA); L 0–3	Gunaya (INA); L 0–3	Kosal (CAM); L 0–3	—N/a	4	Did not advance			
Leo Macalanda	Singles	TT7	Thapaeng (THA); L 0–3	Đặng (VIE); L 0–3	Mustopa (INA); L 0–3	—N/a	4	—N/a	Did not advance		
Jayson Ocampo	Singles	TT7	T B Nguyễn (VIE); L 0–3	Lang (CAM); W 3–1	Punpoo (THA); L 0–3	—N/a	3	—N/a	Did not advance		
Jobert Lumanta	Singles	TT8	Prahasta (INA); L 1–3	V H Phạm (VIE); L 0–3	Charitsat (THA); L 1–3	—N/a	4	Did not advance			
Andrew Kevin Arandia	Singles	TT9	Samee (THA); W 3–0	Zi (MAS); W 3–0	Suratman (INA); L 1–3	—N/a	2	Chee (MAS); L 1–3	Did not advance		
Benedicto Gaela	Singles	TT9	Kusnanto (INA); L 1–3	T T Phạm (VIE); L 0–3	—N/a		3	Did not advance			
Linard Sultan	Singles	TT9	Azizi (INA); W 3–1	Chee (MAS); L 0–3	Melanon (THA); W 3–0	—N/a	2	T T Phạm (VIE); W 3–1	Suratman (INA); L 2–3	Did not advance	3rd place, bronze medalist(s)
Pablo Catalan	Singles	TT10	Lucencio (PHI); W 3–0	Akbar (INA); L 0–3	Sillapakong (THA); L 0–3	Kankingkam (THA); L 0–3	4	—N/a			3rd place, bronze medalist(s)
Rommel Lucencio	Singles	TT10	Akbar (INA); L 0–3	Catalan (PHI); L 0–3	Sillapakong (THA); L 0–3	Kankingkam (THA); L 0–3	5	—N/a			
Angelo Haganas	Singles	TT11	Yusuf (INA); L 0–3	Techo (THA); L 0–3	Chaiprathum (THA); W 3–1	—N/a	4	—N/a	Did not advance		
Smith Billy Cartera; Racleo Martinez Jr.	Doubles	TT4	Chaiwut; Harnpichai (THA); L 0–3	Channa; Chea (CAM); W 3–1	—N/a		2	—N/a	Astan; Gunaya (INA); L 0–3	Did not advance	3rd place, bronze medalist(s)
Manuel Repato; Darwin Salvacion	Doubles	TT5	Hardiyanto; Layaba (INA); L 0–3	Chanphaka; Klangmanee (THA); L 0–3	B A Nguyễn; Trần (VIE); L 0–3	—N/a	4	—N/a			
Leo Macalanda; Jayson Ocampo	Doubles	TT6–7	Hidayat; Mustopa (INA); L 0–3	Punpoo; Thainiyom (THA); L 0–3	Đặng; T B Nguyễn (VIE); L 0–3	—N/a	4	—N/a			
Andrew Kevin Arandia; Pablo Catalan	Doubles	TT9	Kusnanto; Suratman (INA); L 0–3	M T Phạm; T T Phạm (VIE); L 1–3	—N/a		3	—N/a	Did not advance		
Benedicto Gaela; Linard Sultan	Doubles	TT9	Chee; Zi (MAS); L 0–3	Melanon; Samee (THA); W 3–2	—N/a		2	—N/a	Kusnanto; Suratman (INA); W 3–2	Chee; Zi (MAS); L 0–3	2nd place, silver medalist(s)
Manuel Repato; Darwin Salvacion	Team	TT1–3	Indonesia (INA); L 0–2	Thailand (THA); L 0–2	Singapore (SGP); L 1–2	Cambodia (CAM); L 0–2	5	—N/a			
Smith Billy Cartera; Racleo Martinez Jr.	Team	TT4	Thailand (THA); L 0–2	Indonesia (INA); L 0–2	Cambodia (CAM); W 2–0	—N/a					3rd place, bronze medalist(s)
Jobert Lumanta; Leo Macalanda; Jayson Ocampo	Team	TT8	Indonesia (INA); L 0–2	Timor-Leste (TLS); W 2–0	—N/a		2	—N/a	Thailand (THA); L 0–2	Did not advance	3rd place, bronze medalist(s)
Andrew Kevin Arandia; Benedicto Gaela; Linard Sultan	Team	TT9	Malaysia (MAS); L 0–2	Indonesia (INA); L 0–2	—N/a		3	—N/a			
Pablo Catalan; Rommel Lucencio	Team	TT10	Thailand (THA); L 0–2	Indonesia (INA); L 0–2	—N/a		3	—N/a			

=== Women's ===
Athlete	Event	Class	Group Stage				Semifinals	Final	
Athlete	Event	Class	Opposition Score	Opposition Score	Opposition Score	Rank	Opposition Score	Opposition Score	Rank
Lucena Jaranilla	Singles	TT3	Herawati (INA); L 0–3	Wararitdamrongkul (THA); L 0–3	Intanon (THA); L 0–3	4	Did not advance		
Ana Tilacan	Singles	TT3	Asayut (THA); L 0–3	Yany (INA); L 0–3	Muslim (INA); L 0–3	4	Did not advance		
Jhona Peña	Singles	TT7	Siti Fadillah (INA); L 0–3	—N/a		2	—N/a		
Purification Mingarine	Singles	TT8	Hamida (INA); L 0–3	Chaiwut (THA); L 0–3	Lê (VIE); L 0–3	4	Did not advance		
Angela Querubin	Singles	TT9	Yuniar (INA); L 0–3	T H P Nguyễn (VIE); L 1–3	—N/a	3	Did not advance		
Minnie Cadag	Singles	TT10	Juliani (INA); L 0–3	Việt (VIE); L 2–3	Chapandung (THA); L 0–3	4	Did not advance		
Mary Eloise Sable	Singles	TT10	Khompast (THA); L 2–3	Radayana (INA); L 0–3	Wong (MAS); L 0–3	4	Did not advance		
Lucena Jaranilla; Ana Tilacan	Doubles	TT4	Muslim; Yany (INA); L 0–3	Chariya; Saroung (CAM); L 1–3	Jaion; Srigam (THA); L 0–3	4	—N/a		
Jhona Peña; Angela Querubin	Doubles	TT9	Chen; Seng (CAM); W 3–0	Lê; T H P Nguyễn (VIE); L 0–3	—N/a	2	Resti; Yuniar (INA); L 0–3	Did not advance	3rd place, bronze medalist(s)
Minnie Cadag; Mary Eloise Sable	Doubles	TT10	Chapandung; Settisrikoedkun (THA); L 0–3	Hoàng; Việt (VIE); W 3–0	Juliani; Radayana (INA); L 0–3	—N/a			3rd place, bronze medalist(s)
Lucena Jaranilla; Ana Tilacan	Team	TT1–3	Indonesia (INA); L 0–2	Thailand (THA); L 0–2	—N/a	3	—N/a		
Purification Mingarine; Jhona Peña	Team	TT8	Thailand (THA); L 0–2	Indonesia (INA); L 0–2	—N/a	3	—N/a		
Minnie Cadag; Angela Querubin; Mary Eloise Sable	Team	TT10	Thailand (THA); L 0–2	Indonesia (INA); L 0–2	Vietnam (VIE); L 0–2	4	—N/a		

=== Mixed doubles ===
Athlete	Class	Group Stage					Semifinals	Final	
Athlete	Class	Opposition Score	Opposition Score	Opposition Score	Opposition Score	Rank	Opposition Score	Opposition Score	Rank
Smith Billy Cartera; Ana Tilacan	T4	Astan; Tarsilem (INA); L 0–3	Chariya; Sopheap (CAM); W 3–0	Harnpichai; Srigam (THA); L 0–3	—N/a	3	Did not advance		
Lucena Jaranilla; Darwin Salvacion	T5	Chanphaka; Sringam (THA); L 0–3	Sao; Sorm (CAM); W 3–0	—N/a		2	Hardiyanto; Marlina (INA); L 0–3	Did not advance	3rd place, bronze medalist(s)
Leo Macalanda; Jhona Peña	T6–7	dos Santos; Neves (TLS); W 3–0	Kokaew; Thainiyom (THA); L 0–3	Siti Fadillah; Mustopa (INA); L 0–3	Phathumchai; Punpoo (THA); L 1–3	4	—N/a		
Jobert Lumanta; Purification Mingarine	T8	Suangtho; Wangphonphathanasiri (THA); L 0–3	Đô; Lê (VIE); L 0–3	Hamida; Mulyo (INA); L 0–3	—N/a	4	Did not advance		
Pablo Catalan; Angela Querubin	TT9	Kusnanto; Resti; Yuniar (INA); L 1–3	T H P Nguyễn; V H Phạm (VIE); L 1–3	—N/a		3	Did not advance		
Andrew Kevin Arandia; Mary Eloise Sable	TT10	Akbar; Radayana (INA); L 1–3	Kankingkam; Khompast (THA); W 3–1	T T Phạm; Việt (VIE); W 3–0	—N/a	2	Chee; Wong (MAS); L 0–3	Did not advance	3rd place, bronze medalist(s)
Minnie Cadag; Rommel Lucencio	TT10	Azimi; Juliani (INA); L 0–3	Chapandung; Sillapakong (THA); L 0–3	Chee; Wong (MAS); L 0–3	—N/a	4	Did not advance		

== Wheelchair basketball ==
=== 3x3 basketball ===
Team	Event	Group Stage					Final / BM	
Team	Event	Opposition Score	Opposition Score	Opposition Score	Opposition Score	Rank	Opposition Score	Rank
Philippines men's	Men's tournament	Indonesia; W 11–5	Cambodia; W 14–5	Thailand; L 6–18	Malaysia; W 8–7	2	Thailand; L 7–15	2nd place, silver medalist(s)
Philippines women's	Women's tournament	Laos; L 1–9	Cambodia; L 0–14	Thailand; L 2–17	—N/a	4	Laos; L 5–8	4

==== Men's tournament ====
Pos	Team	Pld	W	L	PF	PA	PD	Pts	Qualification
1	Thailand (THA)	4	4	0	70	31	+39	8	Qualified for the Gold medal match
2	Philippines (PHI)	4	3	1	39	35	+4	7	Qualified for the Gold medal match
3	Malaysia (MAS)	4	2	2	42	41	+1	6	Qualified for the Bronze medal match
4	Cambodia (CAM) (H)	4	1	3	29	50	−21	5	Qualified for the Bronze medal match
5	Indonesia (INA)	4	0	4	28	51	−23	4	

Source: APG 2023
(H) Hosts

June 2, 2023

Indonesia	5–11	Philippines

Morodok Techo National Stadium

June 2, 2023

Cambodia	5–14	Philippines

Morodok Techo National Stadium

June 2, 2023

Philippines	6–18	Thailand

Morodok Techo National Stadium

June 2, 2023

Malaysia	7–8	Philippines

Morodok Techo National Stadium

==== Gold medal match ====
June 3, 2023

Thailand	15–7	Philippines

Morodok Techo National Stadium

==== Women's tournament ====
Pos	Team	Pld	W	L	PF	PA	PD	Pts	Qualification
1	Thailand (THA)	3	3	0	37	10	+27	6	Qualified for the Gold medal match
2	Cambodia (CAM) (H)	3	2	1	37	11	+26	5	Qualified for the Gold medal match
3	Laos (LAO)	3	1	2	11	27	−16	4	Qualified for the Bronze medal match
4	Philippines (PHI)	3	0	3	3	40	−37	3	Qualified for the Bronze medal match

Source: APG 2023
(H) Hosts

June 2, 2023

Laos	9–1	Philippines

Morodok Techo National Stadium

June 2, 2023

Cambodia	14–0	Philippines

Morodok Techo National Stadium

June 2, 2023

Philippines	2–17	Thailand

Morodok Techo National Stadium

==== Bronze medal match ====
June 3, 2023

Laos	8–5	Philippines

Morodok Techo National Stadium

=== 5x5 basketball ===
Team	Event	Group Stage					Final / BM	
Team	Event	Opposition Score	Opposition Score	Opposition Score	Opposition Score	Rank	Opposition Score	Rank
Philippines men's	Men's tournament	Indonesia; W 73–34	Thailand; L 35-71	Cambodia; W 79-41	Malaysia; W 50–31	2	Thailand; L 30–68	2nd place, silver medalist(s)
Philippines women's	Women's tournament	Laos; L 31–50	Thailand; L 25-65	Cambodia; L 25–40	—N/a	4	Laos; L 14–54	4

==== Men's tournament ====
Pos	Team	Pld	W	L	PF	PA	PD	Pts	Qualification
1	Thailand (THA)	4	4	0	313	121	+192	8	Qualified for the Gold medal match
2	Philippines (PHI)	4	3	1	237	177	+60	7	Qualified for the Gold medal match
3	Malaysia (MAS)	4	2	2	227	165	+62	6	Qualified for the Bronze medal match
4	Indonesia (INA)	4	1	3	162	268	−106	5	Qualified for the Bronze medal match
5	Cambodia (CAM) (H)	4	0	4	139	327	−188	4	

Source: APG 2023
(H) Hosts

June 4, 2023

Indonesia	34–73	Philippines

Morodok Techo National Stadium

June 5, 2023

Philippines	35–71	Thailand

Morodok Techo National Stadium

June 5, 2023

Cambodia	41–79	Philippines

Morodok Techo National Stadium

June 6, 2023

Malaysia	31–50	Philippines

Morodok Techo National Stadium

==== Gold medal match ====
June 7, 2023

Thailand	68–30	Philippines

Morodok Techo National Stadium

==== Women's tournament ====
Pos	Team	Pld	W	L	PF	PA	PD	Pts	Qualification
1	Thailand (THA)	3	3	0	186	81	+105	6	Qualified for the Gold medal match
2	Cambodia (CAM) (H)	3	2	1	120	102	+18	5	Qualified for the Gold medal match
3	Laos (LAO)	3	1	2	103	150	−47	4	Qualified for the Bronze medal match
4	Philippines (PHI)	3	0	3	80	156	−76	3	Qualified for the Bronze medal match

Source: APG 2023
(H) Hosts

June 4, 2023

Laos	50–31	Philippines

Morodok Techo National Stadium

June 5, 2023

Philippines	25–65	Thailand

Morodok Techo National Stadium

June 6, 2023

Cambodia	40–25	Philippines

Morodok Techo National Stadium

==== Bronze medal match ====
June 7, 2023

Laos	54–14	Philippines

Morodok Techo National Stadium
