= Cambodia at the 2023 ASEAN Para Games =

- IPC code: CAM
- NPC: National Paralympic Committee of Cambodia

in Phnom Penh, Cambodia 3–9 June 2023
- Competitors: 252
- Flag bearers: Oeun Nut (Sitting volleyball)
- Medals Ranked 8th: Gold 9 Silver 18 Bronze 44 Total 71

ASEAN Para Games appearances
- 2001; 2003; 2005; 2008; 2009; 2011; 2014; 2015; 2017; 2022; 2023

Cambodia hosted the 2023 ASEAN Para Games in Phnom Penh from June 3 to 9, 2023 and participated with a contingent of 252 athletes.

The country won its first gold medal on June 3, 2023, in the women's 3-on-3 wheelchair basketball event.

== Medal summary ==
=== Medal by sport ===
Medals by sport
Sport	1st place, gold medalist(s)	2nd place, silver medalist(s)	3rd place, bronze medalist(s)	Total	Rank
Athletics	6	13	25	44	7
Powerlifting	2	0	2	4	5
Wheelchair basketball	1	1	0	2	2
Judo	0	2	3	5	4
Boccia	0	1	2	3	5
Swimming	0	1	2	3	8
Table tennis	0	0	7	7	7
Badminton	0	0	2	2	5
Sitting volleyball	0	0	1	1	3
Blind football	0	0	0	0	4
Football 7-a-side	0	0	0	0	4
Goalball	0	0	0	0	6
Chess	0	0	0	0	6
Total	9	18	44	71	8

=== Medal by date ===
Reference: https://games.cambodia2023.com/#medalstanding

Medals by date
Day	Date	1st place, gold medalist(s)	2nd place, silver medalist(s)	3rd place, bronze medalist(s)	Total
-1	2 June	0	0	0	0
1	3 June	Opening ceremony			
1	3 June	1	0	0	1
2	4 June	1	1	4	6
3	5 June	1	6	6	13
4	6 June	3	3	15	21
5	7 June	3	7	12	22
6	8 June	0	1	7	8
7	9 June	0	0	0	0
7	9 June	Closing Ceremony			
Total		9	18	44	71

=== Medal by gender ===
Reference: https://games.cambodia2023.com/#medalstanding

Medals by gender
Gender	(gold)	2nd place, silver medalist(s)	3rd place, bronze medalist(s)	Total	Percentage	Rank
Male	3	12	25	40	56.3%	7
Female	6	5	18	29	40.8%	6
Mixed	0	1	1	2	2.82%	3
Total	9	18	44	71	100%	8

== Medalists ==
Source: Official website

Medal	Name	Sport	Event	Date
Gold	An Sinet; Pheung Phors; Soem Da; San Rotha; Lak Savry	Wheelchair basketball	Women's team 3x3	3 June
Gold	Vet Chantha	Athletics	Women's Long jump T64	4 June
Gold	Vet Chantha	Athletics	Women's 400 m T64	5 June
Gold	Vet Chantha	Athletics	Women's 200 m T64	6 June
Gold	Yin Sot	Athletics	Women's 800 m T11	6 June
Gold	Nguon Ratana	Athletics	Women's 1,500 m T11	6 June
Gold	Van Sochen	Athletics	Men's High jump T46	7 June
Gold	Kong Sela	Powerlifting	Men's 107 Kg	7 June
Gold	Kong Sela	Powerlifting	Men's 107 Kg (Total lift)	7 June
Silver	Soeung Sreypech	Judo	Women's J1 48 Kg	4 June
Silver	Hea Hok	Athletics	Men's 100 m T53	5 June
Silver	Van Vun	Athletics	Men's 100 m T54	5 June
Silver	Chim Phan	Athletics	Men's 800 m T64	5 June
Silver	Roeun Rin	Athletics	Men's Javelin throw F11	5 June
Silver	Heng Heng Hoeurng	Judo	Men's J2 +90 Kg	5 June
Silver	Khouy Koy	Swimming	Men's 50 m breaststroke SB7	5 June
Silver	Sambath Samban	Athletics	Men's Shot put F11	6 June
Silver	Phea Phawat	Athletics	Men's Shot put F54	6 June
Silver	Sun Sreymom	Athletics	Women's 800 m T12	6 June
Silver	Hea Hok	Athletics	Men's 200 m T53	7 June
Silver	Van Vun	Athletics	Men's 200 m T54	7 June
Silver	Chim Phan	Athletics	Men's 1,500 m T64	7 June
Silver	Poul Sarravann	Athletics	Men's Javelin throw F54	7 June
Silver	Nguon Ratana	Athletics	Women's 800 m T46	7 June
Silver	Kang Chamroeun	Athletics	Women's Long jump T12	7 June
Silver	An Sinet; Doung Chamraksa; Ek Srey Mom; Ho Chanthy; Lak Savry; Moa Et; Pheung Phors; San Rotha; Sieng Sok Chan; Soem Da; Tao Chanda; Ton Tom	Wheelchair basketball	Women's team 5x5	7 June
Silver	Sourn Sary; Nak Vanna	Boccia	Mixed Pair BC4	8 June
Bronze	Nun Theara	Athletics	Men's 1,500 m T11	4 June
Bronze	Chhoeurng Sreymach	Athletics	Women's Shot put F64	4 June
Bronze	Chey Virak	Judo	Men's J1 60 Kg	4 June
Bronze	Khouy Koy	Swimming	Men's 100 m breaststroke SB7	4 June
Bronze	Chhun Phun	Athletics	Men's 100 m T53	5 June
Bronze	Nhork Kimhour	Athletics	Men's 800 m T64	5 June
Bronze	Lach Ryna	Athletics	Men's Javelin throw F11	5 June
Bronze	Yin Sot	Athletics	Women's 400 m T11	5 June
Bronze	Leng Tithvibol	Judo	Men's J2 60 Kg	5 June
Bronze	Ek Nhansamoth; Pov Nuch; Neak Dy	Table tennis	Men's Team TT1–3	5 June
Bronze	Chhun Phun	Athletics	Men's 400 m T53	6 June
Bronze	Tha Phannit Phannit	Athletics	Men's Shot put F11	6 June
Bronze	Ya Tholradeth	Athletics	Men's Triple jump T46	6 June
Bronze	Bong Hong	Athletics	Men's Triple jump T47	6 June
Bronze	Kroem Long	Athletics	Women's 800 m T11	6 June
Bronze	Hoeun Navy	Athletics	Women's 800 m T12	6 June
Bronze	Srun Buntheng	Athletics	Women's 1,500 m T46	6 June
Bronze	Sorn Sas	Boccia	Women's Individual BC2	6 June
Bronze	Soeung Sreypech; Duong Phanha; Hun Nhean	Judo	Women's Team	6 June
Bronze	Chreng Lun	Powerlifting	Women's 79 Kg	6 June
Bronze	Chreng Lun	Powerlifting	Women's 79 Kg (Total lift)	6 June
Bronze	Ek Nhansamoth; Pov Nuch	Table tennis	Men's Doubles TT1–3	6 June
Bronze	Yoy Kosal; Phoeun Sopheap	Table tennis	Men's Doubles TT4	6 June
Bronze	Chhorn Chariya; Sorn Saroung	Table tennis	Women's Doubles TT4	6 June
Bronze	Sun Sorm; Yuok Nam	Table tennis	Women's Doubles TT5	6 June
Bronze	Chhun Phun	Athletics	Men's 200 m T53	7 June
Bronze	Lach Ryna	Athletics	Men's 800 m T11	7 June
Bronze	Nhork Kimhour	Athletics	Men's 1,500 m T64	7 June
Bronze	Vann Chamroeun	Athletics	Men's Discus throw F11	7 June
Bronze	Hour Chlosa	Athletics	Men's Discus throw F46	7 June
Bronze	Sok Chaiya	Athletics	Men's High jump T46	7 June
Bronze	Bong Hong	Athletics	Men's Long jump T47	7 June
Bronze	Hour Chlosa	Athletics	Men's Shot put F46	7 June
Bronze	Srun Buntheng	Athletics	Women's 800m T46	7 June
Bronze	Chhoeurng Sreymach	Athletics	Women's Javelin throw F64	7 June
Bronze	Yin Sot	Athletics	Women's Long jump T11	7 June
Bronze	Sun Sreymom	Athletics	Women's Long jump T12	7 June
Bronze	Pay veasna Veng Ve	Badminton	Men's Doubles SH6	8 June
Bronze	Chha Sreyneang	Badminton	Women's Singles SL3	8 June
Bronze	Pril Veasna; Meach Sophea; Sorn Sas	Boccia	Mixed Team BC1–2	8 June
Bronze	Yav Vannak	Swimming	Men's 50 m freestyle S10	8 June
Bronze	Sorn Saroung	Table tennis	Women's Singles TT4	8 June
Bronze	Yuok Nam	Table tennis	Women's Singles TT5	8 June
Bronze	Ing Phiream; Ka Nai; Kao Hoeurn; Nhonh Sok; Oeun Nut; Ou Phalla; Pon Dina; Srieng Sokna; Tong Ravy; Saing Veasna; Mon Yaranh; Youm Kreum	Sitting volleyball	Men's team	8 June

== Athletics ==
=== Track & road events ===
==== Men ====
Athlete	Event	Final	
Athlete	Event	Time	Rank
Ek Reaksmey	100 m T44	—N/a	5th
Mol Leakhna	100 m T44	—N/a	6th
Nang Sokka	100 m T44	—N/a	7th
Ya Tholradeth	100 m T46	Disqualified	
Hea Hok	100 m T53	00:15.20	2nd place, silver medalist(s)
Chhun Phun	100 m T53	00:15.60	3rd place, bronze medalist(s)
Hun Seun	100 m T53	00:16.60	5th
Van Vun	100 m T54	00:14.29	2nd place, silver medalist(s)
Heng Savoeun	100 m T54	00:14.90	5th
Chhorm Veasna	100 m T64	—N/a	6th
Ek Reaksmey	200 m T44	00:28.61	4th
Nang Sokka	200 m T44	00:33.43	5th
Mol Leakhna	200 m T44	00:35.19	6th
Bong Hong	200 m T47	00:25.88	6th
Uk Samphors	200 m T47	00:25.97	7th
Eun Chek	200 m T47	00:29.08	8th
Hea Hok	200 m T53	00:26.71	2nd place, silver medalist(s)
Chhun Phun	200 m T53	00:27.11	3rd place, bronze medalist(s)
Hun Seun	200 m T53	00:28.66	6th
Van Vun	200m T54	00:25.40	2nd place, silver medalist(s)
Heng Savoeun	200m T54	00:26.06	5th
Chhorm Veasna	200 m T64	00:32.48	5th
Kam Sovandara	400 m T20	01:01.66	5th
Phon Suvann	400 m T20	01:13.88	6th
Bong Hong	400 m T47	00:55.41	6th
Uk Samphors	400 m T47	00:58.01	7th
Eun Chek	400 m T47	DNS	
Chhun Phun	400 m T53	00:51.82	3rd place, bronze medalist(s)
Hea Hok	400 m T53	00:53.83	5th
Hun Seun	400 m T53	00:55.20	6th
Van Vun	400 m T54	00:47.54	4th
Heng Savoeun	400 m T54	00:48.23	6th
Chim Phan	400 m T64	01:00.58	5th
Nhork Kimhour	400 m T64	01:06.91	6th
Chhorm Veasna	400 m T64	01:22.03	7th
Lach Ryna	800 m T11	03:01.82	3rd place, bronze medalist(s)
Chhat Dit	800 m T11	03:09.73	4th
Chab Tuo	800 m T11	03:23.42	5th
Kam Sovandara	800 m T20	02:35.84	9th
Phon Suvann	800 m T20	02:50.41	10th
Poeung Vuthy	800 m T20	03:13.32	11th
Chim Phan	800 m T64	02:24.32	2nd place, silver medalist(s)
Nhork Kimhour	800 m T64	02:48.73	3rd place, bronze medalist(s)
San Mao	800 m T64	03:08.71	4th
Nun Theara	1,500 m T11	07:30.92	3rd place, bronze medalist(s)
Roth Chhaysamang	1,500 m T11	07:39.04	4th
Chab Koeun	1,500 m T11	08:14.04	5th
Keo Vanthai	1,500 m T12	05:26.92	5th
Phon Suvann	1,500 m T20	05:55.70	10th
Poeung Vuthy	1,500 m T20	07:32.14	11th
Yi Soksan	1,500 m T46	04:51.22	5th
Chim Phan	1,500 m T64	05:12.50	2nd place, silver medalist(s)
Nhork Kimhour	1,500 m T64	06:08.37	3rd place, bronze medalist(s)
San Mao	1,500 m T64	06:38.46	4th
Yi Soksan	5,000 m T46	19:01.24	4th
Bong Hong; Chim Phan; Uk Samphors; Ya Tholradeth	4 x 100 relay T42–47	00:48.94	4th
Nhork Kimhour; Chim Phan; Uk Samphors; Ya Tholradeth	4 x 400 relay T42–47	04:01.51	4th

==== Women ====
Athlete	Event	Final	
Athlete	Event	Time	Rank
Rorn Ratana	100 m T47	00:17.55	4th
Sith Kithya	200 m T44	00:46.08	4th
Rorn Ratana	200 m T47	00:37.71	4th
Vet Chantha	200 m T64	00:31.27	1st place, gold medalist(s)
Yin Sot	400 m T11	01:08.41	3rd place, bronze medalist(s)
Roeung Leakhana	400 m T20	01:21.80	6th
Sith Kithya	400 m T44	02:18.32	4th
Nguon Ratana	400 m T46–47	01:15.51	5th
Srun Buntheng	400 m T46–47	01:23.16	6th
Rorn Ratana	400 m T46–47	01:29.36	7th
Kheng Chantha	400 m T46–47	02:03.60	8th
Vet Chantha	400 m T64	01:12.69	1st place, gold medalist(s)
Yin Sot	800 m T11	02:56.74	1st place, gold medalist(s)
Kroem Long	800 m T11	03:36.31	3rd place, bronze medalist(s)
Phal Mab	800 m T11	Disqualified	
Sun Sreymom	800 m T12	03:32.10	2nd place, silver medalist(s)
Hoeun Navy	800 m T12	03:47.38	3rd place, bronze medalist(s)
Kang Chamroeun	800 m T12	03:56.48	4th
Roeung Leakhana	800 m T20	03:13.61	6th
Nguon Ratana	800 m T46	02:57.94	2nd place, silver medalist(s)
Srun Buntheng	800 m T46	03:19.29	3rd place, bronze medalist(s)
Kheng CHantha	800 m T46	05:05.26	4th
Roeung Leakhana	1,500 m T20	07:07.20	5th
Nguon Ratana	1,500 m T46	06:24.44	1st place, gold medalist(s)
Srun Buntheng	1,500 m T46	06:48.30	3rd place, bronze medalist(s)
Kheng CHantha	1,500 m T46	10:21.68	4th

=== Field events ===
==== Men ====
Athlete	Event	Final	
Athlete	Event	Distance (m)	Rank
Van Sochen	High jump T46	1.38	1st place, gold medalist(s)
Sok Chaiya	High jump T46	1.38	3rd place, bronze medalist(s)
Hour Chlosa	High jump T46	1.23	4th
Kam Sovandara	Long jump T20	4.35	6th
Ya Tholradeth	Long jump T46	5.49	5th
Van Sochen	Long jump T46	4.60	7th
Bong Hong	Long jump T47	5.15	3rd place, bronze medalist(s)
Uk Samphors	Long jump T47	4.70	4th
Ya Tholradeth	Triple jump T46	11.02	3rd place, bronze medalist(s)
Van Sochen	Triple jump T46	9.96	4th
Yi Soksan	Triple jump T46	9.46	5th
Bong Hong	Long jump T47	11.04	3rd place, bronze medalist(s)
Uk Samphors	Long jump T47	10.85	4th
Eun Chek	Long jump T47	9.33	5th
Vann Chamroeun	Discus throw F11	14.92	3rd place, bronze medalist(s)
Lach Ryna	Discus throw F11	14.60	4th
Hour Chlosa	Discus throw F46	27.26	3rd place, bronze medalist(s)
Meas Sabun	Discus throw F57	23.17	7th
Mun Meng	Discus throw F57	21.28	8th
Roeun Rin	Javelin throw F11	18.28	2nd place, silver medalist(s)
Lach Ryna	Javelin throw F11	17.88	3rd place, bronze medalist(s)
Nun Theara	Javelin throw F11	14.76	4th
Roth Chhaysamang	Javelin throw F11	DNS	
Hour Chlosa	Javelin throw F46	30.27	5th
Poul Sarravann	Javelin throw F54	9.99	2nd place, silver medalist(s)
Phea Phawat	Javelin throw F54	9.73	3rd place, bronze medalist(s)
Yorn Chan Sopheak	Javelin throw F56	12.74	5th
Sem Sovantha	Javelin throw F56	10.22	6th
Meas Sabun	Javelin throw F57	24.69	6th
Mun Meng	Javelin throw F57	23.00	7th
Sambath Samban	Shot put F11	5.16	2nd place, silver medalist(s)
Tha Phannit Phannit	Shot put F11	5.14	3rd place, bronze medalist(s)
Chab Tuo	Shot put F11	4.89	4th
Vann Chamroeun	Shot put F11	DNS	
Hour Chlosa	Shot put F46	8.02	3rd place, bronze medalist(s)
Van Sochen	Shot put F46	5.90	4th
Phea Phawat	Shot put F54	4.17	2nd place, silver medalist(s)
Poul Sarravann	Shot put F54	3.89	3rd place, bronze medalist(s)
Sem Sovantha	Shot put F56	4.86	5th
Yorn Chan Sopheak	Shot put F56	4.18	6th
Mun Meng	Shot put F57	8.21	7th
Meas Sabun	Shot put F57	7.78	8th

==== Women ====
Athlete	Event	Final	
Athlete	Event	Distance (m)	Rank
Yin Sot	Long jump T11	2.61	3rd place, bronze medalist(s)
Phal Mab	Long jump T11	2.41	4th
Kang Chamroeun	Long jump T12	2.40	2nd place, silver medalist(s)
Sun Sreymom	Long jump T12	2.39	3rd place, bronze medalist(s)
Hoeun Navy	Long jump T12	1.89	4th
Sith Kithya	Long jump T44	2.46	4th
Vet Chantha	Long jump T64	3.99	1st place, gold medalist(s)
Chhoeurng Sreymach	Javelin throw F64	13.73	3rd place, bronze medalist(s)
Leay Sreydav	Javelin throw F64	11.88	5th
Tha Sreya	Javelin throw F64	5.29	6th
Chhoeurng Sreymach	Shot put F64	5.06	3rd place, bronze medalist(s)
Leay Sreydav	Shot put F64	4.21	4th
Tha Sreya	Shot put F64	3.41	5th

== Badminton ==
=== Men ===
Athlete	Event	Group Stage				Quarterfinals	Semifinals	Final	
Athlete	Event	Opposition Score	Opposition Score	Opposition Score	Rank	Opposition Score	Opposition Score	Opposition Score	Rank
Suy Samnang	Singles SL3	Maman Nurjaman (INA); L 0–2 (7–21, 6–21)	Joseph Garbo Asoque (PHI); W 2–0 (Walkover)	—N/a	2nd	Mongkhon Bunsun (THA); L 0–2 (4–21, 10–21)	Did not advance		
Sen Vary	Singles SL3	Poloong Loc (VIE); L 0–2 (18–21, 18–21)	Ukun Rukaendi (INA); L 0–2 (Walkover)	—N/a	3rd	Did not advance			
Dekeister Jean Yves	Singles SL4	Fredy Setiawan (INA); L 0–2 (Walkover)	Chee Hiong Ang (SGP); L 0–2 (4–21, 6–21)	—N/a	3rd	Did not advance			
Choa Thyrith	Singles SU5	Antonio Dela Cruz Jr. (PHI); L 0–2 (8–21, 8–21)	Mohamed Faris Azri (MAS); L 0–2 (8–21, 7–21)	Oddie Kurnia Putra (INA); L 0–2 (4–21, 4–21)	4th	Did not advance			
Has Lyhak	Singles SH6	Dimas Tri Aji (INA); L 0–2 (0–21, 3–21)	Nattapong Meechai (THA); L 0–2 (10–21, 13–21)	—N/a	3rd	Did not advance			
Rith Metriey	Singles SH6	Muhammad Amin Azmi (MAS); L 0–2 (2–21, 1–21)	Xavier Jie Rui Lim (SGP); L 0–2 (4–21, 7–21)	—N/a	3rd	Did not advance			
Sen Vary; Suy Samnang	Doubles SL3–SL4	Nguyen Van Thuong; Trinh Anh Tuan (VIE); L 0–2 (9–21, 9–21)	Singha Sangnil; Siripong Teamarrom (THA); L 0–2 (7–21, 12–21)	Dwiyoko Dwiyoko; Fredy Setiawan (INA); L 0–2 (8–21, 7–21)	4th	Did not advance			
Has Lyhak; Rith Metriey	Doubles SH6	Pay Veasna; Veng Ve (CAM); L 0–2 (16–21, 15–21)	Dimas Tri Aji; Subhan Subhan (INA); L 0–2 (7–21, 4–21)	Bunthan Yaemmali; Nattapong Meechai (THA); L 0–2 (3–21, 7–21)	4th	—N/a			
Pay Veasna; Veng Ve	Doubles SH6	Has Lyhak; Rith Metriey (CAM); W 2–0 (21–16, 21–15)	Dimas Tri Aji; Subhan Subhan (INA); L 0–2 (4–21, 2–21)	Bunthan Yaemmali; Nattapong Meechai (THA); L 0–2 (8–21, 6–21)	3rd place, bronze medalist(s)	—N/a			

=== Women ===
Athlete	Event	Group Stage			Semifinals	Final	
Athlete	Event	Opposition Score	Opposition Score	Rank	Opposition Score	Opposition Score	Rank
Yi Sochan	Singles WH2	Paz Enano Lita (PHI); L 0–2 (5–21, 15–21)	Le Thi Thu Hien (VIE); L 0–2 (10–21, 13–21)	3rd	Did not advance		
Chha Sreyneang	Singles SL3	Darunee Henpraiwan (THA); L 0–2 (7–21, 6–21)	Chheun Tevy (CAM); W 2–0 (21–8, 21–7)	2nd	Qonitah Syakuroh (INA); L 0–2 (1–21, 0–21)	Did not advance	3rd place, bronze medalist(s)
Chheun Tevy	Singles SL3	Darunee Henpraiwan (THA); L 0–2 (8–21, 4–21)	Chha Sreyneang (CAM); L 0–2 (8–21, 7–21)	3rd	Did not advance		
Poch Kaolong	Singles SL3	Wandee Kamtam (THA); L 0–2 (4–21, 9–21)	Qonitah Syakuroh (INA); L 0–2 (3–21, 2–21)	3rd	Did not advance		

=== Mixed ===
Athlete	Event	Group Stage			Semifinals	Final	
Athlete	Event	Opposition Score	Opposition Score	Rank	Opposition Score	Opposition Score	Rank
Choa Thyrith; Poch Kaolong	Doubles SL3–SU5	Fredy Setiawan; Khalimatus Sadiyah (INA); L 0–2 (6–21, 4–21)	Darunee Henpraiwan; Pricha Somsiri (THA); L 0–2 (7–21, 10–21)	3rd	Did not advance		
Chheun Tevy; Sen Vary	Doubles SL3–SU5	Hikmat Ramdani; Leani Ratri Oktila (INA); L 0–2 (Walkover)	Siripong Teamarrom; Nipada Saensuda (THA); L 0–2 (Walkover)	3rd	Did not advance		

== Blind football ==
Team	Event	Group Stage				Final / BM	
Team	Event	Opposition Score	Opposition Score	Opposition Score	Rank	Opposition Score	Rank
Chorm Makara; Mey Punlork; Roeunrn Ravy; Som Theara; Vin Vichet; Huon Chanveasna; Khuon Sophea; Ry Saray; Sorn Deth	Men's team	Laos; L 0–3	Thailand; L 1–6	Malaysia; L 1–2	4th	Laos; L 0–4	4th

== Boccia ==
=== Men ===
Athlete	Event	Pool Stage				Quarterfinals	Semifinals	Final / BM	
Athlete	Event	Opposition Score	Opposition Score	Opposition Score	Rank	Opposition Score	Opposition Score	Opposition Score	Rank
Soun Sokchy	Individual BC2	Felix Ardi Yudha (INA); L 1–15	David Dayrit Gonzaga (PHI); W 6–3	Worawut Saengampa (THA); L 0–15	3rd	Did not advance			
Pril Veasna	Individual BC2	Muhammad Bintang Herlangga (INA); L 2–8	Iman Haikal Saifulifram (MAS); W 5–1	—N/a	2nd	Fekix Ardi Yudha (INA); L 0–11	Did not advance		
Nak Vanna	Individual BC4	Rithikrai Somsanuk (THA); W 8–4	Abdul Razzaq Rahman (MAS); W 10–0	Nguyen Ba Vuong (VIE); W 10–0	1st	—N/a	Pornchok Larpyen (THA); L 4–6	Faris Sugiarta (INA); L 3–5	4th

=== Women ===
Athlete	Event	Pool Stage				Semifinals	Final / BM	
Athlete	Event	Opposition Score	Opposition Score	Opposition Score	Rank	Opposition Score	Opposition Score	Rank
Meach Sophea	Individual BC1	Handayani Handayani (INA); L 1–9	Yee Ting Jeralyn Tan (SGP); L 1–10	—N/a	3rd	Did not advance		
Keat Channy	Individual BC2	Gischa Zayana (INA); L 0–7	Daniella Torres Catacutan (PHI); L 1–5	Nguyen Nhat Uyen (VIE); L 3–5	4th	Did not advance		
Sorn Sas	Individual BC2	Avrinda Anis Anis (MAS); L 0–6	Febriyanti Vani Rahmadhani (INA); W 6–0	—N/a	2nd	Gischa Zayana (INA); L 3–4	Avrinda Anis Anis (MAS); W 7–1	3rd place, bronze medalist(s)
Sourn Sary	Individual BC4	Michelle Saniel Fernandez (PHI); L 0–6	Chalisa Khiawjantra (THA); L 2–3	—N/a	3rd	Did not advance		

=== Mixed ===
Athlete	Event	Pool Stage					Semifinals	Final / BM	
Athlete	Event	Opposition Score	Opposition Score	Opposition Score	Opposition Score	Rank	Opposition Score	Opposition Score	Rank
Meach Sophea; Sorn Sas; Pril Veasna	Team BC1–2	Satanan Phromsiri; Watcharaphon Vongsa; Worawut Saengampa (THA); L 1–19	Jakai Lee; Khamsing Khaoon; Touny Onemouy (LAO); W 6–4	—N/a		2nd	Felix Ardi Yudha; Handayani Handayani; Muhammad Bintang Herlangga (INA); L 1–17	Daniella Torres Catacutan; Davit Dayrit Gonzaga; Joey Eriga De Leon (PHI); W 6–3	3rd place, bronze medalist(s)
Nak Vanna; Sourn Sary	Pair BC4	Abdul Razzaq Rahman; Noor Askuzaimey Mat Salim (MAS); W 4–2	Michelle Saniel Fernandez; Ramon Reyemmanuel Apilado (PHI); W 13–0	Faris Sugiarta; Wening Purbawati (INA); W 4–1	Nuanchan Phonsila; Ritthikrai Somsanuk (THA); L 1–11	2nd place, silver medalist(s)	—N/a		

== Chess ==
=== Men's individual ===
Athlete	Event								
Athlete	Event	Round 1	Round 2	Round 3	Round 4	Round 5	Round 6	Total score	Rank
Athlete	Event	Opposition Score	Opposition Score	Opposition Score	Opposition Score	Opposition Score	Opposition Score	Total score	Rank
Pen Rottina	Blitz PI	Alfrets Dien (INA); L 0–1	Abilio De Araujo (TLS); W 1–0	Methavee Thassanamethin (THA); D 0.5–0.5	Sin Vandy (CAM); W 1–0	Felix Mijares Aguilera (PHI); L 0–1	Ahmad Nazmi Md Nizam (MAS); L 0–1	2.5	12th
Ke Moeurn	Blitz PI	Chanon Mongkoltawephun (THA); L 0–1	Nguyen Anh Tuan (VIE); L 0–1	Ardiah Syah Muming (MAS); L 0–1	Abilio De Araujo (TLS); W 1–0	Ahmad Nazmi Md Nizam (MAS); L 0–1	Methavee Thassanamethin (THA); D 0.5–0.5	1.5	17th
Sin Vandy	Blitz PI	Yoodthana Khoonmee (THA); L 0–1	Ardiah Syah Muming (MAS); W 1–0	Nguyen Anh Tuan (VIE); L 0–1	Pen Rottina (CAM); L 0–1	Chanon Mongkoltawephun (THA); L 0–1	Abilio De Araujo (TLS); W 1–0	2	16th
Ke Moeurn	Rapid PI	Alfrets Dien (INA); L 0–1	Chanon Mongkoltawephun (THA); L 0–1	Pen Rottina (CAM); W 1–0	Nguyen Anh Tuan (VIE); L 0–1	Abilio De Araujo (TLS); L 0–1	Ardiah Syah Muming (MAS); L 0–1	1	17th
Pen Rottina	Rapid PI	Ardiah Syah Muming (MAS); L 0–1	Duong Hien Vuong (VIE); L 0–1	Ke Moeurn (CAM); L 0–1	Abilio De Araujo (TLS); W 1–0	Chanon Mongkoltawephun (THA); L 0–1	Sin Vandy (CAM); L 0–1	1	16th
Sin Vandy	Rapid PI	Methavee Thassanamethin (THA); L 0–1	Abilio De Araujo (TLS); W 1–0	Ahmad Nazmi Md Nizam (MAS); L 0–1	Alfrets Dien (INA); L 0–1	Ardiah Syah Muming (MAS); W 1–0	Pen Rottina (CAM); W 1–0	3	9th
Chea Kem	Standard PI	Duong Hien Vuong (VIE); L 0–1	Ardiah Syah Muming (MAS); L 0–1	Yoodthana Khoonmee (THA); L 0–1	Abilio De Araujo (TLS); W 1–0	Sin Thoeun (CAM); W 1–0	Chanon Mongkoltawephun (THA); L 0–1	2	14th
Choek Channtha	Standard PI	Methavee Thassanamethin (THA); L 0–1	Chanon Mongkoltawephun (THA); L 0–1	Maksum Firdaus (INA); L 0–1	Ardiah Syah Muming (MAS); L 0–1	Abilio De Araujo (TLS); W 1–0	Sin Thoeun (CAM); L 0–1	1	17th
Sin Thoeun	Standard PI	Nguyen Van Quan (VIE); L 0–1	Abilio De Araujo (TLS); W 1–0	Maksum Firdaus (INA); L 0–1	Nguyen Anh Tuan (VIE); L 0–1	Chea Kem (CAM); L 0–1	Choek Channtha (CAM); W 1–0	2	16th

=== Men's team ===
Athlete	Event	Total score	Rank
Pen Rottana; Sin Vandy	Blitz PI	4.5	5th
Ke Moeurn; Sin Vandy	Rapid PI	4	6th
Chea Kem; Sin Thoeun	Standard PI	4	6th

== Esports (Demonstration) ==
As a demonstration sport, medals won in esports will not count towards Cambodia's official medal tally.

Team	Event	Group Stage				Semifinals	Final / BM	
Team	Event	Opposition Score	Opposition Score	Opposition Score	Rank	Opposition Score	Opposition Score	Rank
Cheom Chorn; Chok Phearak; Roeurn Channy; Uk Viraksatya; Vichet Sokchea	Men's Mobile Legends: Bang Bang	Philippines; L 0–2	Malaysia; L 0–2	Thailand; W 2–0	3rd	Malaysia; L 0–2	Thailand; W 2–0	3rd place, bronze medalist(s)

== Football 7-a-side ==
Team	Event	Group Stage			Semifinals	Final / BM / FM	
Team	Event	Opposition Score	Opposition Score	Rank	Opposition Score	Opposition Score	Rank
Sum Chanrom; Kong Liang; Chea Nironn; Heng Sopheakmonipiseth; Lao Sophanna; Oum Vanny; Chhom Veasna; Seng Chandara; Brous Keb; Han Limhoy; Bin Odam; Doung Sarith; Tam Sophy	Men's team	Indonesia; L 0–8	Malaysia; L 3–5	3rd	Did not advance	Philippines; W 4–2	5th

== Goalball ==
Team	Event	Group Stage			Semifinals	Final / BM	
Team	Event	Opposition Score	Opposition Score	Rank	Opposition Score	Opposition Score	Rank
Bun Vuthy; Lun Liet; Keo Ryna; Om Chean; Sean Phary; Van Sokvat	Men's tournament	Myanmar; L 10–13	Thailand; L 2–12	3rd	Did not advance		

== Judo ==
=== Men's individual ===
Team	Event	Group Stage				
Team	Event	Opposition Score	Opposition Score	Opposition Score	Opposition Score	Rank
Chey Virak	J1 60Kg	Junaedi Junaedi (INA); L 0–100	Vitoon Kongsuk (THA); L 0–100	Vo Thunh Trieu (VIE); L 100–0	Christian Philif Belarmino (PHI); L 0–100	3rd place, bronze medalist(s)
Leng Tithvibol	J2 60Kg	Mohd Khairul Azmi Rahaman (MAS); W 100–10	Nguyen Viet Tu (VIE); L 10–100	Bayu Pangestu Aji (INA); L 0–100	Yovan Rate Azis (INA); L 0–100	3rd place, bronze medalist(s)
Bi Samnang	J1 73Kg	Natthaphon Phaibun (THA); L 0–100	Rizal Saepul Azis (INA); L 0–100	Deterson Pasigon Omas (PHI); L 0–100	Tran Viet Hung (VIE); L 0–100	5th
Den Lang	J2 73Kg	Sahrul Sulaiman (INA); L 0–100	Muhammad Fatah Bakar (MAS); L 10–100	—N/a		3rd
Heng Heng Hoeurng	J2 +90Kg	Tony Ricardo Mantolas (INA); L 100–200	—N/a			2nd place, silver medalist(s)

=== Men's team ===
Team	Event	Quarterfinals	Semifinals	Final	
Team	Event	Opposition Score	Opposition Score	Opposition Score	Rank
Chey Virak; Leng Tithvibol; Bi Samnang	Team	Mohd Khairul Azmi Rahaman; Muhammad Fatah Bakar; Lee Chee Hock (MAS); L 1–2	Did not advance		

=== Women's individual ===
Team	Event	Group Stage		
Team	Event	Opposition Score	Opposition Score	Rank
Soeung Sreypech	J1 48Kg	Hun Nhean (CAM); W 100–0	Novia Larassati (INA); L 0–100	2nd place, silver medalist(s)
Hun Nhean	J1 48Kg	Soeung Sreypech (CAM); L 0–100	Novia Larassati (INA); L 0–100	3rd
Duong Phanha	J2 48Kg	Scolastika Nadya Valentin (INA); L 0–100	Petoori Janudom (THA); L 0–100	3rd

=== Women's team ===
Team	Event	Quarterfinals	Semifinals	Final	
Team	Event	Opposition Score	Opposition Score	Opposition Score	Rank
Soeung Sreypech; Duong Phanha; Hun Nhean	Team	Novia Larassati; Marialam Sihotang; Roma Siska Tampubolon (INA); L 0–2	Petoori Janudom; Pornsiri Trachu (THA); L 1–2	—N/a	3rd place, bronze medalist(s)

== Powerlifting ==
=== Men ===
Athlete	Event	Results			Final			
Athlete	Event	Attempt 1	Attempt 2	Attempt 3	Best lift	Rank	Total lift	Rank
Sman Paozy	54Kg	30	~~31~~	~~32~~	30	7th	30	7th
Brak Tue	59Kg	70	80	83	83	8th	233	7th
Som Sean	65Kg	85	90	~~97~~	90	7th	175	7th
Hong Sopheak	80Kg	125	128	~~130~~	128	4th	253	4th
Kong Sela	107Kg	50	53	55	55	1st place, gold medalist(s)	158	1st place, gold medalist(s)

=== Women ===
Athlete	Event	Results			Final			
Athlete	Event	Attempt 1	Attempt 2	Attempt 3	Best lift	Rank	Total lift	Rank
Chreng Lun	79 Kg	56	~~57~~	60	60	3rd place, bronze medalist(s)	116	3rd place, bronze medalist(s)

== Swimming ==
=== Men ===
Athlete	Event	Final	
Athlete	Event	Time	Rank
Chum Chou	50 m butterfly S9	00:32.65	7th
Muoy Yin	100 m butterfly S8	01:20.46	5th
Chum Chou	100 m butterfly S9	01:17.49	4th
Karay Pich	50 m backstroke S4	01:29.39	4th
Sen Sum	50 m backstroke S5	01:02.43	7th
Tort Chhoem Tort	100 m backstroke S9	01:36.49	6th
Karay Pich	50 m breaststroke SB3	01:09.32	5th
Sen Sum	50 m breaststroke SB4	00:57.80	5th
Khouy Koy	50 m breaststroke SB7	00:44.09	2nd place, silver medalist(s)
You Sochea	50 m breaststroke SB7	00:51.57	8th
Mot Seak Kheng	50 m breaststroke SB7	00:56.90	9th
Nget Bor	50 m breaststroke SB8	00:40.09	4th
Sen Sum	100 m breaststroke SB4	02:20.14	7th
Sambor Kong	100 m breaststroke SB6	02:19.50	6th
Khouy Koy	100 m breaststroke SB7	01:38.33	3rd place, bronze medalist(s)
You Sochea	100 m breaststroke SB7	02:01.79	5th
Mot Seak Kheng	100 m breaststroke SB7	02:01.81	6th
Nget Bor	100 m breaststroke SB8	01:28.90	4th
Vannak Yav	100 m breaststroke SB9	01:28.29	4th
Khley Kom	100 m breaststroke SB9	Disqualified	
Chey Lonh	50 m freestyle S7	00:38.94	10th
Muoy Yun	50 m freestyle S8	00:31.39	4th
Khouy Koy	50 m freestyle S8	00:33.89	5th
Mot Seak Kheng	50 m freestyle S8	00:46.14	8th
Chum Chou	50 m freestyle S9	00:30.69	5th
Vannak Yav	50 m freestyle S10	00:29.25	3rd place, bronze medalist(s)
Chey Lonh	100 m freestyle S7	01:27.51	9th
Sambor Kong	100 m freestyle S8	01:30.81	5th
Khley Korn	100 m freestyle S9	01:14.10	12th
Tort Chhoem Tort	100 m freestyle S9	01:17.48	13th
Chey Lonh	400 m freestyle S7	07:00.66	8th
You Sochea	400 m freestyle S8	06:12.78	4th
Sambor Kong	400 m freestyle S8	06:43.14	6th
Tort Chhoem Tort	400 m freestyle S9	06:16.81	7th
Muoy Yun	200 m individual medley SM8	03:05.69	6th
Nget Bor	200 m individual medley SM8	03:28.35	9th
Khley Korn	200 m individual medley SM9	03:13.15	10th
Vannak Yav	200 m individual medley SM10	02:47.85	4th
Khley Korn; Chum Chou; Muoy Yun; You Sochea	4 x 100 m freestyle relay 34 points	04:57.68	7th

=== Women ===
Athlete	Event	Final	
Athlete	Event	Time	Rank
Ngov Chrep	50 m freestyle S6	00:51.33	5th
Chantha Thoeun	50 m freestyle S7	00:51.71	2nd
Ngov Chrep	100 m freestyle S6	01:58.96	6th
Chantha Thoeun	100 m freestyle S7	02:00.52	4th
Ngov Chrep	400 m freestyle S6	08:44.57	4th
Chantha Thoeun	400 m freestyle S7	10:18.99	2nd

== Table tennis ==
=== Men ===
Athlete	Event	Group Stage					Quarterfinals	Semifinals	Final	
Athlete	Event	Opposition Score	Opposition Score	Opposition Score	Opposition Score	Rank	Opposition Score	Opposition Score	Opposition Score	Rank
Ek Nhansamoth	Singles TT3	Aman Suratman (INA); W 3–0 (11–8, 11–4, 11–7)	Yuttajak Glinbancheun (THA); L 0–3 (7–11, 7–11, 7–11)	—N/a		2nd	Busree Wawaeni (THA); L 0–3 (9–11, 5–11, 3–11)	Did not advance		
Pov Nuch	Singles TT3	Anurak Laowong (THA); L 0–3 (4–11, 3–11, 4–11)	Darwin Labastida Salvacion (PHI); W 3–0 (11–8, 11–7, 11–8)	Sefrianto Sefrianto (INA); L 1–3 (8–11, 7–11, 11–5, 13–15)	—N/a	3rd	Did not advance			
Neak Dy	Singles TT3	Muhammad Dinie Bin Huzaini (SGP); L 0–3 (4–11, 4–11, 2–11)	Cahyo Pambudi (INA); L 1–3 (11–7, 6–11, 9–11, 2–11)	Busree Wawaeni (THA); L 0–3 (9–11, 5–11, 3–11)	—N/a	4th	Did not advance			
Sry Chea	Singles TT4	Sunatro Sunatro (INA); L 1–3 (6–11, 11–6, 6–11, 3–11)	Wanchai Chaiwut (THA); L 0–3 (1–11, 2–11, 7–11)	—N/a		3rd	Did not advance			
Phoeun Sopheap	Singles TT4	Smith Billy Cartera (PHI); L 1–3 (3–11, 11–13, 11–9, 8–11)	Paisol Pateh (THA); L 2–3 (11–8, 7–11, 4–11, 11–5, 2–11)	Adyos Astan (INA); L 0–3 (3–11, 5–11, 2–11)	—N/a	4th	Did not advance			
Yoy Kosal	Singles TT4	Kittinan Harnpichai (THA); W 3–2 (8–11, 12–10, 11–7, 1–11, 11–7)	Yayang Gunaya (INA); L 1–3 (6–11, 7–11, 17–15, 7–11)	Racleo Candila Martinez Jr. (PHI); W 3–0 (11–9, 11–4, 11–5)	—N/a	2nd	Sunatro Sunatro (INA); L 0–3 (7–11, 9–11, 9–11)	Did not advance		
Yong Phav	Singles TT6	Paulo Da Silva Neves (TLS); L 0–3 (3–11, 2–11, 1–11)	Rahmad Hidayat (INA); L 0–3 (2–11, 4–11, 5–11)	—N/a		3rd	Did not advance			
Hong Lang	Singles TT6	Jayson Combe Ocampo (PHI); L 1–3 (5–11, 11–6, 1–11, 4–11)	Nguyen Thanh Binh (VIE); L 0–3 (2–11, 3–11, 4–11)	Chalermpong Punpoo (THA); L 0–3 (2–11, 5–11, 3–11)	—N/a	4th	Did not advance			
Hieng Kea	Singles TT8	Phisit Wangphonphathanasiri (THA); L 0–3 (3–11, 2–11, 2–11)	Do Truong Anh (VIE); L 0–3 (2–11, 2–11, 2–11)	Leonardo Aritonang (INA); L 0–3 (9–11, 4–11, 5–11)	—N/a	4th	Did not advance			
Neak Dy; Yan Chamroeun	Doubles TT1–3	Cahyo Pambudi; Sefrianto Sefrianto (INA); L 0–3 (2–11, 2–11, 5–11)	Anurak Laowong; Yuttajak Glinbancheun (THA); L 0–3 (1–11, 3–11, 4–11)	—N/a		3rd	—N/a	Did not advance		
Pov Nuch; Ek Nhansamoth	Doubles TT1–3	Muhammad Dinie Bin Huzaini; Zhixian Rodrick Li (SGP); W 3–0 (11–9, 11–5, 11–9)	Busree Wawaeni; Thirayu Chueawong (THA); L 0–3 (7–11, 5–11, 7–11)	Andi Santoso; Audy Ngangi (INA); W 3–0 (11–9, 11–5, 11–4)	—N/a	2nd	—N/a	Anurak Laowong; Yuttajak Glinbancheun (THA); L 0–3 (9–11, 8–11, 4–11)	Did not advance	3rd place, bronze medalist(s)
Yoy Kosal; Phoeun Sopheap	Doubles TT4	Adyos Astan; Yayang Gunaya (INA); L 0–3 (5–11, 3–11, 9–11)	Natthawut Thinathet; Paisol Pateh (THA); W 3–2 (11–8, 11–8, 10–12, 6–11, 11–8)	—N/a		2nd	—N/a	Kittinan Harnpichai; Wanchai Chaiwut (THA); L 0–3 (5–11, 2–11, 9–11)	Did not advance	3rd place, bronze medalist(s)
In Channa; Sry Chea	Doubles TT4	Racleo Candila Martinez Jr. Smith Billy Cartera (PHI); L 1–3 (9–11, 11–9, 5–11, 6–11)	Kittinan Harnpichai; Wanchai Chaiwut (THA); L 0–3 (7–11, 4–11, 2–11)	—N/a		3rd	—N/a	Did not advance		
Hou Pheakdey; Hieng Kea	Doubles TT8	Aung Kyaw Htoo; Toe Thet Aung (MYA); L 0–3 (4–11, 5–11, 1–11)	Komkrit Charitsal; Phisit Wangphonphathanasiri (THA); L 0–3 (1–11, 1–11, 1–11)	Leonardo Aritonang; Varly Jerico Tilaar (INA); L 0–3 (1–11, 5–11, 10–12)	—N/a	4th	—N/a	Did not advance		
Pov Nuch; Ek Nhansamoth; Neak Dy	Team TT1–3	Darwin Labastida Salvacion; Manuel Buena Repato (PHI); W 2–0	Muhammad Dinie Bin Huzaini; Zhixian Rodrick Li (SGP); W 2–0	Andi Santoso; Cahyo Pambudi; Audy Ngangi (INA); L 0–2	Busree Wawaeni; Yuttajak Glinbancheun; Anurak Laowong (THA); L 0–2	3rd place, bronze medalist(s)	—N/a			
Yoy Kosal; Sry Chea; Phoeun Sopheap	Team TT4	Racleo Candila Martinez Jr. Smith Billy Cartera (PHI); L 0–2	Adyos Astan; Yayang Gunaya; Sunatro Sunatro (INA); L 0–2	Wanchai Chaiwut; Kittinan Harnpichai; Paisol Pateh (THA); L 0–2	—N/a	4th	—N/a			
Sao Chorn; Yan Chamroeun	Team TT5	Norakan Chanphaka; Teeradech Klangmanee; Thirayu Chueawong (THA); L 0–2	Tatok Hardiyanto; Sefrianto Sefrianto; Barce Eysantend Layaba (INA); L 0–2	Nguyen Ba An; Tran Van Thang (VIE); L 0–2	—N/a	4th	—N/a			
Phav Yong; Lang Hong	Team TT6–7	Rungroj Thainiyom; Suriyone Thapaeng; Phitsadan Oiuyen (THA); L 0–2	Rahmad Hidayat; Varly Jerico Tilaar; Enceng Mustopa (INA); L 0–2	Nguyen Thanh Binh; Dang The Can (VIE); L 0–2	—N/a	4th	—N/a			

=== Women ===
Athlete	Event	Group Stage				Semifinals	Final	
Athlete	Event	Opposition Score	Opposition Score	Opposition Score	Rank	Opposition Score	Opposition Score	Rank
Sorn Saroung	Singles TT4	Chhorn Chariya (CAM); W 3–1 (11–8, 11–2, 7–11, 11–3)	Wijittra Jaion (THA); L 0–3 (2–11, 2–11, 3–11)	—N/a	2nd	Wassana Srigam (THA); L 0–3 (5–11, 5–11, 6–11)	Did not advance	3rd place, bronze medalist(s)
Chhorn Chariya	Singles TT4	Sorn Saroung (CAM); L 1–3 (8–11, 2–11, 11–7, 3–11)	Wijittra Jaion (THA); L 0–3 (2–11, 3–11, 7–11)	—N/a	3rd	Did not advance		
Sen Phalla	Singles TT4	Tarsilem Tarsilem (INA); L 0–3 (3–11, 3–11, 6–11)	Wassana Srigam (THA); L 0–3 (2–11, 3–11, 7–11)	—N/a	3rd	Did not advance		
Rat Kamsat	Singles TT5	Leli Marlina (INA); L 0–3 (3–11, 2–11, 2–11)	Supalak Butgunha (THA); L 0–3 (5–11, 2–11, 2–11)	—N/a	3rd	Did not advance		
Sun Sorm	Singles TT5	Yuok Nam (CAM); L 1–3 (12–10, 8–11, 8–11, 9–11)	Panwas Sringam (THA); L 0–3 (3–11, 5–11, 5–11)	—N/a	3rd	Did not advance		
Yuok Nam	Singles TT5	Sun Sorm (CAM); W 3–1 (10–12, 11–8, 11–8, 11–9)	Panwas Sringam (THA); L 0–3 (2–11, 5–11, 3–11)	—N/a	2nd	Leli Marlina (INA); L 0–3 (2–11, 2–11, 2–11)	Did not advance	3rd place, bronze medalist(s)
Chhorn Chariya; Sorn Saroung	Doubles TT4	Ida Yany; Osrita Muslim (INA); L 0–3 (9–11, 2–11, 3–11)	Wassana Srigam; Wijittra Jaion (THA); L 0–3 (1–11, 3–11, 6–11)	Ana Sumating Tilacan; Lucena Baje Jaranilla (PHI); W 3–1 (11–6, 11–7, 6–11, 11–8)	3rd place, bronze medalist(s)	—N/a		
Youk Nam; Sun Sorm	Doubles TT5	Ret Kamsat; Touch Tenghy (CAM); W 3–0 (11–8, 11–2, 11–4)	Leli Marlina; Tarsilem Tarsilem (INA); L 0–3 (1–11, 3–11, 2–11)	Panwas Sringam; Supalak Butganha (THA); L 0–3 (2–11, 2–11, 3–11)	3rd place, bronze medalist(s)	—N/a		
Ret Kamsat; Touch Tenghy	Doubles TT5	Youk Nam; Sun Sorm (CAM); L 0–3 (8–11, 2–11, 4–11)	Panwas Sringam; Supalak Butganha (THA); L 0–3 (4–11, 3–11	Leli Marlina; Tarsilem Tarsilem (INA); L 0–3 (5–11, 2–11, 3–11)	4th	—N/a		
Sat Vibol; Seng Sokuntheary	Doubles TT9	Hana Resti; Imas Yuniar (INA); L 0–3 (1–11, 2–11, 4–11)	Liliana Da Costa Silva Mesquita; Pascoela Dos Santos (TLS); L 0–3 (5–11, 3–11, 2–11)	—N/a	3rd	Did not advance		
Chen Veasna; Seng Sokuntheary	Doubles TT9	Le Thi Hong Huong; Nguyen Thi Hoa Phuong (VIE); L 0–3 (2–11, 4–11, 4–11)	Angela Labrador Querubin; Jhona Buban Pena (PHI); L 0–3 (6–11, 1–11, 2–11)	—N/a	3rd	Did not advance		
Sorn Saroung; Chorn Chariya; Sen Phalla	Team TT4	Wijittra Jaion; Wassana Srigam; Chilchitparyak Bootwansirina (THA); L 0–2	—N/a		2nd	—N/a		
Yuok Nam; Sun Sorm; Ret Kamsat	Team TT5	Leli Marlina; Tarsilem Tarsilem (INA); L 0–2	Panwas Sringam; Supalak Butgunha; Suthida Saensathan (THA); L 0–2	—N/a	3rd	—N/a		
Seng Sokuntheary; Sat Vibol; Touch Sopheap	Team TT9	Liliana Da Costa Silva Mesquita; Pascoela Dos Santos (TLS); L 0–2	Le Thi Hong Huong; Hoang Thi Thuc Tram (VIE); L 0–2	Imas Yuniar; Hana Resti (INA); L 0–2	4th	—N/a		

=== Mixed ===
Medals by date
Day	Date	1st place, gold medalist(s)	2nd place, silver medalist(s)	3rd place, bronze medalist(s)	Total
-1	2 June	0	0	0	0
1	3 June	Opening ceremony			
1	3 June	1	0	0	1
2	4 June	1	1	4	6
3	5 June	1	6	6	13
4	6 June	3	3	15	21
5	7 June	3	7	12	22
6	8 June	0	1	7	8
7	9 June	0	0	0	0
7	9 June	Closing Ceremony			
Total		9	18	44	71

=== Medal by gender ===
Reference: https://games.cambodia2023.com/#medalstanding

Medals by gender
Gender	1st place, gold medalist(s)	2nd place, silver medalist(s)	3rd place, bronze medalist(s)	Total	Percentage	Rank
Male	3	12	25	40	56.3%	7
Female	6	5	18	29	40.8%	6
Mixed	0	1	1	2	2.82%	3
Total	9	18	44	71	100%	8

== Sitting volleyball ==
Team	Event	Group Stage					Semifinals	Final / BM	
Team	Event	Opposition Score	Opposition Score	Opposition Score	Opposition Score	Rank	Opposition Score	Opposition Score	Rank
Ing Phiream; Ka Nai; Kao Hoeurn; Nhonh Sok; Oeun Nut; Ou Phalla; Pon Dina; Srieng Sokna; Tong Ravy; Saing Veasna; Mon Yaranh; Youm Kreum	Men's tournament	Philippines; W 3–0	Myanmar; W 3–0	Thailand; L 1–3	Indonesia; W 3–0	2nd	Indonesia; L 2–3	Myanmar; W 3–0	3rd place, bronze medalist(s)
Mut Channy; Kong Sras; Yan Malin; Ngorn Veasna; Lors Mimul; On Phan; Pring Thorn; Rem Suon; Pheang Sophy; Tun Sreymom; Vat Chanra	Women's tournament	Indonesia; L 0–3	Thailand; L 0–3	Indonesia; L 0–3	Thailand; L 0–3	3rd	—N/a		

== Wheelchair basketball ==
Team	Event	Group Stage					Final / BM	
Team	Event	Opposition Score	Opposition Score	Opposition Score	Opposition Score	Rank	Opposition Score	Rank
Chork Chan; Toy Chren; Vat Chamrong; Kay Los; Lorn Vannak	Men's tournament 3x3	Thailand; L 8–15	Philippines; L 5–14	Malaysia; L 6–12	Indonesia; W 10–9	4th	Malaysia; L 8–17	4th
An Sinet; Lak Savry; Pheung Phors; San Rotha; Soem Da	Women's tournament 3x3	Thailand; L 7–10	Philippines; W 14–0	Laos; W 16–1	—N/a	2nd	Thailand; W 11–9	1st place, gold medalist(s)
Chork Chan; Kay Los; Lim Leang; Lorn Vannak; Nhuong Vicheth; Phou Sin; Se Sara; Sem Kimsou; Sou Dara; Thav Thet; Toy Chren; Vat Chamrong	Men's tournament 5x5	Thailand; L 15–91	Malaysia; L 34–91	Philippines; L 41–79	Indonesia; L 49–66	5th	Did not advance	
An Sinet; Doung Chamraksa; Ek Srey Mom; Ho Chanthy; Lak Savry; Moa Et; Pheung Phors; San Rotha; Sieng Sok Chan; Soem Da; Tao Chanda; Ton Tom	Women's tournament 5x5	Thailand; L 32–49	Laos; W 48–28	Philippines; W 40–25	—N/a	2nd	Thailand; L 26–66	2nd place, silver medalist(s)
