= Judo at the 2023 ASEAN Para Games =

Judo competition

- Venue: Federation of Youth Hall, Phnom Penh
- Dates: 4–6 June 2023

Judo at the 2023 ASEAN Para Games was held at Federation of Youth Hall, Phnom Penh from 4–6 June 2023.

== Medal summary ==
* Host nation (Cambodia)

Rank	Nation	Gold	Silver	Bronze	Total
1	Indonesia (INA)	11	5	0	16
2	Thailand (THA)	1	5	1	7
3	Malaysia (MAS)	1	0	1	2
4	Cambodia (CAM)*	0	2	3	5
5	Philippines (PHI)	0	1	3	4
6	Vietnam (VIE)	0	0	4	4
Totals (6 entries)		13	13	12	38

== Medalists ==
Men

Event	Gold	Silver	Bronze
J1 60 kg	Junaedi; Indonesia	Vitoon Kongsuk; Thailand	Chey Virak; Cambodia
J1 60 kg	Junaedi; Indonesia	Vitoon Kongsuk; Thailand	Christian Philif Arca Belarmino; Philippines
J2 60 kg	Yovan Rate Azis; Indonesia	Bayu Pangestu Aji; Indonesia	Tithvibol Leng; Cambodia
J2 60 kg	Yovan Rate Azis; Indonesia	Bayu Pangestu Aji; Indonesia	Nguyễn Viết Tú; Vietnam
J1 73 kg	Rizal Saepul Azis; Indonesia	Deterson Pagison Omas; Philippines	Natthaphon Phaibun; Thailand
J1 73 kg	Rizal Saepul Azis; Indonesia	Deterson Pagison Omas; Philippines	Trần Việt Hùng; Vietnam
J2 73 kg	Muhammad Fatah bin Abu Bakar; Malaysia	Sahrul Sulaiman; Indonesia	not awarded
J1 90 kg	Fajar Pambudi; Indonesia	Kittikai Chaisin; Thailand	Lee Chee Hock; Malaysia
J1 90 kg	Fajar Pambudi; Indonesia	Kittikai Chaisin; Thailand	Huỳnh Tiến Phát; Vietnam
J2 90 kg	Gus Irvan Ma'dum Ibrahim; Indonesia	Elda Fahmi Nur Taufik; Indonesia	not awarded
J2 +90 kg	Tony Ricardo Mantolas; Indonesia	Heng Heng Hoeurng; Cambodia	not awarded
Team	Indonesia (INA); Juneadi; Sahrul Sulaiman; Tony Ricardo Mantolas	Thailand (THA); Vitoon Kongsuk; Natthaphon Phaibun; Kittikai Chaisin	Philippines (PHI); Christian Philif Arca Belarmino; Deterson Pagison Omas; Carlito Evangelista Agustin Jr.
Team	Indonesia (INA); Juneadi; Sahrul Sulaiman; Tony Ricardo Mantolas	Thailand (THA); Vitoon Kongsuk; Natthaphon Phaibun; Kittikai Chaisin	Vietnam (VIE); Nguyễn Viết Tú; Võ Thanh Triều; Huỳnh Tiến Phát

Women

Event	Gold	Silver	Bronze
J1 48 kg	Novia Larassati; Indonesia	Sreypech Soeung; Cambodia	not awarded
J2 48 kg	Scolastika Nadya Valentin; Indonesia	Petoori Janudom; Thailand	not awarded
J2 57 kg	Marialam Sihotang; Indonesia	Nurul Fadilah; Indonesia	Mary Ann Bunagan Taguinod; Philippines
J1 70 kg	Pornsiri Trachu; Thailand	Yuliana Marika Keyn; Indonesia	not awarded
Team	Indonesia (INA); Marialam Sihotang; Novia Larassati; Roma Siska Tampubolon	Thailand (THA); Petoori Janudom; Pornsiri Trachu	Cambodia (CAM); Nhean Hun; Phanha Duong; Sreypech soeung
