= Wheelchair basketball at the 2023 ASEAN Para Games =

Wheelchair basketball competition

- Venue: Morodok Techo National Stadium
- Dates: 2 June – 6 June 2023

Wheelchair basketball at the 2023 ASEAN Para Games was held at the Morodok Techo National Stadium, Phnom Penh from 2 to 6 June 2023.

== Medal summary ==
* Host nation (Cambodia)

Rank	Nation	Gold	Silver	Bronze	Total
1	Thailand (THA)	3	1	0	4
2	Cambodia (CAM)*	1	1	0	2
3	Philippines (PHI)	0	2	0	2
4	Laos (LAO)	0	0	2	2
4	Malaysia (MAS)	0	0	2	2
Totals (5 entries)		4	4	4	12

== Medalists ==
=== Men's ===
Event	Gold	Silver	Bronze
3-on-3	Thailand (THA); Aekkasit Jumjarean; Adisak Kaoboo; Thanakon Lertanachai; Teerapong Pasomsap; Kwanchai Pimkorn	Philippines (PHI); Alfie Cabañog; John Rey Escalante; Rene Macabenguil; Kenneth Christopher Tapia; Cleford Trocino	Malaysia (MAS); Freday Tan Yei Bing; Kartik Kana Pathy; Muhamad Atib Zakaria; Muhammad Azzwar Hassan Asaari; Razali Cantik
Team	Thailand (THA)	Philippines (PHI)	Malaysia (MAS)

=== Women's ===
Event	Gold	Silver	Bronze
3-on-3	Cambodia (CAM); Pheung Phors; Soem Da; San Rotha; Lak Savry; An Sinet	Thailand (THA); Pawarati Jala; Nopparat Tanbut; Natnapa Ponin; Pimjai Putthanoi; Tananya Kaewmak	Laos (LAO); Nit Chittivong; Kaolee Chongxoualee; Phitsamai Keopaseuth; Vilayphone Khammykoun; Phoukhong
Team	Thailand (THA)	Cambodia (CAM)	Laos (LAO)

== Squads ==
Men's

Thailand	Malaysia	Indonesia	Philippines	Cambodia
Adisak Kaoboo; Aekkasit Jumjarean; Kwanchai Pimkorn; Teerapong Pasomsap; Thanakon Lertanachai	Freday Tan Yei Bing; Karthik Kana Pathy; Muhamad Atib Zakaria; Muhammad Azzwar Hassan Asaari; Razali Cantik	Danu Kuswantoro; Denih; I Komang Suparta; Ivo Shadan; Kasep Ayatulloh Ma	Alfi Quinones Cabanog; Cleford Patagnan Trocino; John Rey Aguirre Escalante; Kenneth Christopher Isleta Tapia; Rene Gajano Macabenguil	Chork Chan; Toy Chren; Vat Chamrong; Kay Los; Lorn Vannak

Women's

Philippines	Laos	Thailand	Cambodia
Cecelia Laurente Wells; Jean Dalisay Delos Reyes; Jocely Male Follero; Lorna Gaviola Lilagan; Patricia Camille Castro	Kaolee ChongXoualee; Nit Chtthivong; Phitsamai Keopaseuth; Vilayphone Khammykoun; Phoukhong	Natnapa Ponin; Nopparat Tanbut; Pawarati Jala; Tananya Kaewmak; Pimjai Putthanoi	An Sinet; Lak Savry; Pheung Phors; San Rotha; Soem Da

== Results ==
=== Men's tournament 3-on-3 ===
==== Group stage ====
Pos	Team	Pld	W	L	PF	PA	PD	Pts	Qualification
1	Thailand (THA)	4	4	0	70	31	+39	8	Qualified for the Gold medal match
2	Philippines (PHI)	4	3	1	39	35	+4	7	Qualified for the Gold medal match
3	Malaysia (MAS)	4	2	2	42	41	+1	6	Qualified for the Bronze medal match
4	Cambodia (CAM) (H)	4	1	3	29	50	−21	5	Qualified for the Bronze medal match
5	Indonesia (INA)	4	0	4	28	51	−23	4	

Source: APG 2023
(H) Hosts

June 2, 2023

Malaysia	12–18	Thailand

Morodok Techo National Stadium

June 2, 2023

Indonesia	5–11	Philippines

Morodok Techo National Stadium

June 2, 2023

Cambodia	8–15	Thailand

Morodok Techo National Stadium

June 2, 2023

Indonesia	9–11	Malaysia

Morodok Techo National Stadium

June 2, 2023

Cambodia	5–14	Philippines

Morodok Techo National Stadium

June 2, 2023

Indonesia	5–19	Thailand

Morodok Techo National Stadium

June 2, 2023

Malaysia	12–6	Cambodia

Morodok Techo National Stadium

June 2, 2023

Philippines	6–18	Thailand

Morodok Techo National Stadium

June 2, 2023

Cambodia	10–9	Indonesia

Morodok Techo National Stadium

June 2, 2023

Malaysia	7–8	Philippines

Morodok Techo National Stadium

Final round

==== Bronze medal match ====
June 3, 2023

Malaysia	17–8	Cambodia

Morodok Techo National Stadium

==== Gold medal match ====
June 3, 2023

Thailand	15–7	Philippines

Morodok Techo National Stadium

=== Women's tournament 3-on-3 ===
==== Group stage ====
Pos	Team	Pld	W	L	PF	PA	PD	Pts	Qualification
1	Thailand (THA)	3	3	0	37	10	+27	6	Qualified for the Gold medal match
2	Cambodia (CAM) (H)	3	2	1	37	11	+26	5	Qualified for the Gold medal match
3	Laos (LAO)	3	1	2	11	27	−16	4	Qualified for the Bronze medal match
4	Philippines (PHI)	3	0	3	3	40	−37	3	Qualified for the Bronze medal match

Source: APG 2023
(H) Hosts

June 2, 2023

Cambodia	7–10	Thailand

Morodok Techo National Stadium

June 2, 2023

Laos	9–1	Philippines

Morodok Techo National Stadium

June 2, 2023

Laos	1–10	Thailand

Morodok Techo National Stadium

June 2, 2023

Cambodia	14–0	Philippines

Morodok Techo National Stadium

June 2, 2023

Philippines	2–17	Thailand

Morodok Techo National Stadium

June 2, 2023

Cambodia	16–1	Laos

Morodok Techo National Stadium

Final round

==== Bronze medal match ====
June 3, 2023

Laos	8–5	Philippines

Morodok Techo National Stadium

==== Gold medal match ====
June 3, 2023

Thailand	9–11	Cambodia

Morodok Techo National Stadium

=== Men's tournament 5-on-5 ===
==== Group stage ====
Pos	Team	Pld	W	L	PF	PA	PD	Pts	Qualification
1	Thailand (THA)	4	4	0	313	121	+192	8	Qualified for the Gold medal match
2	Philippines (PHI)	4	3	1	237	177	+60	7	Qualified for the Gold medal match
3	Malaysia (MAS)	4	2	2	227	165	+62	6	Qualified for the Bronze medal match
4	Indonesia (INA)	4	1	3	162	268	−106	5	Qualified for the Bronze medal match
5	Cambodia (CAM) (H)	4	0	4	139	327	−188	4	

Source: APG 2023
(H) Hosts

June 3, 2023

Cambodia	15–91	Thailand

Morodok Techo National Stadium

June 4, 2023

Cambodia	34–91	Malaysia

Morodok Techo National Stadium

June 4, 2023

Indonesia	34–73	Philippines

Morodok Techo National Stadium

June 4, 2023

Malaysia	45–70	Thailand

Morodok Techo National Stadium

June 5, 2023

Philippines	35–71	Thailand

Morodok Techo National Stadium

June 5, 2023

Malaysia	65–36	Indonesia

Morodok Techo National Stadium

June 5, 2023

Cambodia	41–79	Philippines

Morodok Techo National Stadium

June 6, 2023

Indonesia	26–81	Thailand

Morodok Techo National Stadium

June 6, 2023

Malaysia	31–50	Philippines

Morodok Techo National Stadium

June 6, 2023

Cambodia	49–66	Indonesia

Morodok Techo National Stadium

Final round

==== Bronze medal match ====
June 7, 2023

Malaysia	74–40	Indonesia

Morodok Techo National Stadium

==== Gold medal match ====
June 7, 2023

Thailand	68–30	Philippines

Morodok Techo National Stadium

=== Women's tournament 5-on-5 ===
==== Group stage ====
Pos	Team	Pld	W	L	PF	PA	PD	Pts	Qualification
1	Thailand (THA)	3	3	0	186	81	+105	6	Qualified for the Gold medal match
2	Cambodia (CAM) (H)	3	2	1	120	102	+18	5	Qualified for the Gold medal match
3	Laos (LAO)	3	1	2	103	150	−47	4	Qualified for the Bronze medal match
4	Philippines (PHI)	3	0	3	80	156	−76	3	Qualified for the Bronze medal match

Source: APG 2023
(H) Hosts

June 4, 2023

Cambodia	32–49	Thailand

Morodok Techo National Stadium

June 4, 2023

Laos	50–31	Philippines

Morodok Techo National Stadium

June 5, 2023

Philippines	25–65	Thailand

Morodok Techo National Stadium

June 5, 2023

Cambodia	48–28	Laos

Morodok Techo National Stadium

June 6, 2023

Cambodia	40–25	Philippines

Morodok Techo National Stadium

June 6, 2023

Laos	24–72	Thailand

Morodok Techo National Stadium

Final round

==== Bronze medal match ====
June 7, 2023

Laos	54–14	Philippines

Morodok Techo National Stadium

==== Gold medal match ====
June 7, 2023

Thailand	66–26	Cambodia

Morodok Techo National Stadium

== See also ==
- Basketball at the 2023 Southeast Asian Games
