= Marites Burce =

Filipino para-athlete (born 1975)

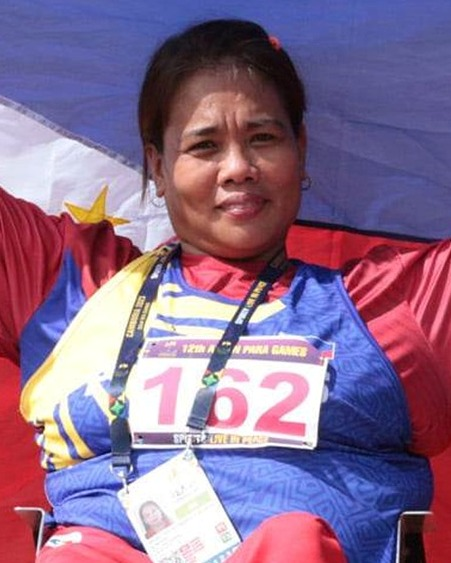
- Burce in 2023

Personal information
- Born: Marites Domingo Burce; August 15, 1975 (age 50) Quezon City, Philippines

Sport
- Country: Philippines
- Sport: Para-athletics
- Disability: Paraplegia
- Disability class: F54
Medal record
Women's para-athletics
Representing the Philippines
Event	1st	2nd	3rd
Asian Para Games	0	1	0
ASEAN Para Games	0	1	2
Total	0	2	2
Asian Para Games
Silver medal – second place	2014 Incheon	Discus throw F52/53/54
ASEAN Para Games
Silver medal – second place	2023 Cambodia	Javelin throw F54
Bronze medal – third place	2023 Cambodia	Shot put F54
Bronze medal – third place	2022 Surakarta	Shot put F54

Marites Domingo Burce (born August 15, 1975) is a Filipino para-athlete who competed at the 2012 Summer Paralympics in London. She uses a wheelchair due to her disability which was caused by polio. She competes in discus throw, javelin throw and shot put under the F54 classification. She also took part in the 2011 ASEAN Paragames where she won two gold medals.

Burce first took up para-track and field in 2005 in Manila. She start representing the Philippines internationally three years later.

Burce took her studies at the Trinity University of Asia in Quezon City. She also worked for the Tahanang Walang Hagdanan in Rizal, a foundation for the disabled, as a teacher and later as a project coordinator.
