= Philippines men's national goalball team =

The Philippines men's national goalball team is the men's national team of Philippines. Goalball is a team sport designed specifically for athletes with a vision impairment. The team takes part in international competitions.

== ASEAN Para Games ==
They have competed at the ASEAN Para Games winning a bronze medal in the 2005 edition.

After their participation in 2005, the team did not join in the goalball event in the succeeding editions until the 2017 ASEAN Para Games. The 2017 ASEAN Para Games team consisted of Jomer Anden, Lemuel Garcia, Jolan Camacho, James dela Cerna, Jefferson Balenton, and Jeff Fernando. The team was led by head coach, Freddie Estacion.

=== Results ===
- 2005: Bronze 3rd
- 2008–2015: Did not enter
- 2017: 6th

== Pacific School Games ==
A mixed-sex youth team competed in the tenth Pacific School Games, Adelaide, South Australia, Australia, in December 2017. Athletes were Shayra Erum, Fionah Mariey Lorena, and Dan Jorens Luzanes.

== See also ==
- Disabled sports
- Philippines at the Paralympics
