= Esports at the 2023 ASEAN Para Games =

- Venue: NABA Theatre, Nagaworld 2
- Location: Phnom Penh, Cambodia
- Dates: 4–5 June 2023

Esports at the 2023 ASEAN Para Games was held from 4 to 5 June 2023 at the NABA Theatre at Nagaworld 2 in Phnom Penh, Cambodia.

Organized by Team TWO in collaboration with the games' organizing committee, esports was held as a demonstration event. This marks the first time that the esports was held in a multi-parasports event.

Mobile Legends: Bang Bang is the only featured video game title. The Philippines won the sole event.

== Medal summary ==
Event	Gold	Silver	Bronze
Mobile Legends: Bang Bang (men's)	Philippines; Marvin Angelo Ignacio; Chester Gonzales; Joshua Detera; Jasper Lorenz Ambat; Ashly Paghubasa	Malaysia; Ahmad Syakirin Zamharin; Aminuddin Al-Hafiz Ismahisham; Hafizuddin Abdul Ghani; Muhammad Danish Danial Hairi; Muhammad Elmi Khuzairi Abdullah; Usamah Ariffin Abdillah	Cambodia; Cheom Chorn; Chok Phearak; Roeurn Channy; Ur Viraksatya; Vichet Sokchea
