= Chess at the 2023 ASEAN Para Games =

Chess competition

- Venue: Royal University of Phnom Penh
- Dates: 3–8 June 2023

Chess at the 2023 ASEAN Para Games was held at Royal University of Phnom Penh, Cambodia, from 3–8 June 2023.

== Medal summary ==
Rank	Nation	Gold	Silver	Bronze	Total
1	Indonesia (INA)	15	17	8	40
2	Philippines (PHI)	13	7	15	35
3	Vietnam (VIE)	8	11	9	28
4	Thailand (THA)	0	1	2	3
5	Myanmar (MYA)	0	0	2	2
Totals (5 entries)		36	36	36	108

== Medalists ==
=== Men ===
Event	Class	Gold	Silver	Bronze
Individual standard	B1	Prasetyo Fitrianto; Indonesia	Francis Bautista Ching; Philippines	Kaung San; Myanmar
Team standard	B1	Indonesia (INA); Indra Yoga; Prasetyo Fitrianto; Yadi Sopiyan	Vietnam (VIE); Đào Tuấn Kiệt; Đinh Tuấn Sơn; Lê Văn Việt	Philippines (PHI); Antonio Frias Abogado; Cecilio Espina Bilog; Francis Bautista Ching
Individual rapid	B1	Indra Yoga; Indonesia	Yadi Sopiyan; Indonesia	Prasetyo Fitrianto; Indonesia
Team rapid	B1	Indonesia (INA); Indra Yoga; Yadi Sopiyan	Vietnam (VIE); Đào Tuấn Kiệt; Lê Văn Việt	Philippines (PHI); Francis Bautista Ching; Rodolfo de Villa Sarmiento
Individual blitz	B1	Prasetyo Fitrianto; Indonesia	Đào Tuấn Kiệt; Vietnam	Francis Bautista Ching; Philippines
Team blitz	B1	Indonesia (INA); Indra Yoga; Prasetyo Fitrianto	Vietnam (VIE); Đào Tuấn Kiệt; Lê Văn Việt	Philippines (PHI); Cecilio Espina Bilog; Francis Bautista Ching
Individual standard	B2/3	Darry Timbol Bernardo; Philippines	Jumadi; Indonesia	Arman Sapida Subaste; Philippines
Team standard	B2/3	Philippines (PHI); Arman Sapida Subaste; Darry Timbol Bernardo; Menandro Junni Redor	Indonesia (INA); Adji Hartono; Gayuh Satrio; Jumadi	Myanmar (MYA); Hla Moe; Lin Htet Naung; Maw Shay
Individual rapid	B2/3	Darry Timbol Bernardo; Philippines	Gayuh Satrio; Indonesia	Menandro Junni Redor; Philippines
Team rapid	B2/3	Philippines (PHI); Darry Timbol Bernardo; Menandro Junni Redor	Indonesia (INA); Gayuh Satrio; Jumadi	Vietnam (VIE); Phạm Lê Anh Kiệt; Trịnh Hữu Đạt
Individual blitz	B2/3	Darry Timbol Bernardo; Philippines	Arman Sapida Subaste; Philippines	Menandro Junni Redor; Philippines
Team blitz	B2/3	Philippines (PHI); Arman Sapida Subaste; Darry Timbol Bernardo	Indonesia (INA); Adji Hartono; Gayuh Satrio	Vietnam (VIE); Phạm Lê Anh Kiệt; Trịnh Hữu Đạt
Individual standard	PI	Tirto; Indonesia	Maksum Firdaus; Indonesia	Henry Roger Iligan Lopez; Philippines
Team standard	PI	Indonesia (INA); Alfrets Dien; Maksum Firdaus; Tirto	Philippines (PHI); Henry Roger Iligan Lopez; Jasper Belarmino Rom; Sander de Erit Severino	Vietnam (VIE); Dương Hiến Vương; Nguyễn Anh Tuấn; Nguyễn Văn Quân
Individual rapid	PI	Maksum Firdaus; Indonesia	Sander de Erit Severino; Philippines	Henry Roger Iligan Lopez; Philippines
Team rapid	PI	Indonesia (INA); Maksum Firdaus; Tirto	Philippines (PHI); Henry Roger Iligan Lopez; Sander de Erit Severino	Vietnam (VIE); Dương Hiến Vương; Nguyễn Anh Tuấn
Individual blitz	PI	Sander de Erit Severino; Philippines	Maksum Firdaus; Indonesia	Felix Mijares Aguilera; Philippines
Team blitz	PI	Philippines (PHI); Sander de Erit Severino; Felix Mijares Aguilera	Indonesia (INA); Maksum Firdaus; Tirto	Vietnam (VIE); Nguyễn Anh Tuấn; Nguyễn Văn Quân

=== Women ===
Event	Class	Gold	Silver	Bronze
Individual standard	B1	Trần Ngọc Loan; Vietnam	Phạm Thị Hương; Vietnam	Wilma Margaretha Sinaga; Indonesia
Team standard	B1	Vietnam (VIE); Đào Thị Lê Xuân; Phạm Thị Hương; Trần Ngọc Loan	Indonesia (INA); Tita Puspita; Wilma Margaretha Sinaga; Yustina Halawa	Philippines (PHI); Elene Pedesma Peligro; Evagenline Gamao; Maria Katrina Pacayra Mangawang
Individual rapid	B1	Phạm Thị Hương; Vietnam	Trần Ngọc Loan; Vietnam	Wilma Margaretha Sinaga; Indonesia
Team rapid	B1	Vietnam (VIE); Phạm Thị Hương; Trần Ngọc Loan	Indonesia (INA); Tita Puspita; Wilma Margaretha Sinaga	Philippines (PHI); Evagenline Gamao; Maria Katrina Pacayra Mangawang
Individual blitz	B1	Wilma Margaretha Sinaga; Indonesia	Trần Ngọc Loan; Vietnam	Phạm Thị Hương; Vietnam
Team blitz	B1	Vietnam (VIE); Phạm Thị Hương; Trần Ngọc Loan	Indonesia (INA); Tita Puspita; Wilma Margaretha Sinaga	Philippines (PHI); Evagenline Gamao; Maria Katrina Pacayra Mangawang
Individual standard	B2/3	Farah Yumna Budiarti; Indonesia	Aisah Wijayanti Putri Brahmana; Indonesia	Nguyễn Thị Mỹ Linh; Vietnam
Team standard	B2/3	Indonesia (INA); Aisah Wijayanti Putri Brahmana; Farah Yumna Budiarti; Khairunnisa	Vietnam (VIE); Nguyễn Thị Hồng; Nguyễn Thị Mỹ Linh; Nguyễn Thị Minh Thư	Thailand (THA); Chanaporn Botkate; Kannika Khuijanthuek; Nonglak Siripatvanich
Individual rapid	B2/3	Farah Yumna Budiarti; Indonesia	Maria Teresa Salaysay Bilog; Philippines	Aisah Wijayanti Putri Brahmana; Indonesia
Team rapid	B2/3	Indonesia (INA); Aisah Wijayanti Putri Brahmana; Farah Yumna Budiarti	Thailand (THA); Kannika Khuijanthuek; Nonglak Siripatvanich	Vietnam (VIE); Nguyễn Thị Hồng; Nguyễn Thị Mỹ Linh
Individual blitz	B2/3	Nguyễn Thị Hồng; Vietnam	Farah Yumna Budiarti; Indonesia	Khairunnisa; Indonesia
Team blitz	B2/3	Vietnam (VIE); Nguyễn Thị Hồng; Nguyễn Thị Mỹ Linh	Indonesia (INA); Farah Yumna Budiarti; Khairunnisa	Thailand (THA); Chanaporn Botkate; Nonglak Siripatvanich
Individual standard	PI	Cheyzer Jamelarin Mendoza; Philippines	Đoàn Thu Huyền; Vietnam	Cheryl Abella Angot; Philippines
Team standard	PI	Philippines (PHI); Cheryl Abella Angot; Cheyzer Jamelarin Mendoza	Indonesia (INA); Lilis Herna Yulia; Yuni	Vietnam (VIE); Đoàn Thu Huyền; Nguyễn Thị Kiều
Individual rapid	PI	Cheyzer Jamelarin Mendoza; Philippines	Đoàn Thu Huyền; Vietnam	Nasip Farta Simanja; Indonesia
Team rapid	PI	Vietnam (VIE); Đoàn Thu Huyền; Nguyễn Thị Kiều	Philippines (PHI); Cheryl Abella Angot; Cheyzer Jamelarin Mendoza	Indonesia (INA); Lilis Herna Yulia; Nasip Farta Simanja
Individual blitz	PI	Cheyzer Jamelarin Mendoza; Philippines	Lilis Herna Yulia; Vietnam	Cheryl Abella Angot; Philippines
Team blitz	PI	Philippines (PHI); Cheryl Abella Angot; Cheyzer Jamelarin Mendoza	Indonesia (INA); Lilis Herna Yulia; Yuni	Vietnam (VIE); Đoàn Thu Huyền; Nguyễn Thị Kiều
