= India at the 2016 Asian Para Athletics Championships =

India competed at the 2016 Asian Para Athletics Championships from March 6 to March 12 in Dubai, United Arab Emirates.

== Results ==
=== Men ===
==== Track Events ====
Athletes	Event	Heat	Result	Final	Result
Sandeep Singh Maan	200m T47	23.04	1st Q	22.85	Silver
Sandeep Singh Maan	400m T47	51.14	1st Q	50.67	Silver
Anand Gunasekaran	200m T44	NA		24.95	Silver
Anand Gunasekaran	400m T44	NA		54.67 AS	Gold
Manoj Baskar	100m T44	NA		12.47	Silver
Manoj Baskar	200m T44	NA		24.91	Gold
Manoj Baskar	400m T44	NA		59.48	Bronze
Ankur Dhama	400m T12	NA		58.46	Bronze
Ankur Dhama	1500m T11	NA		4:18:42	Silver
Ankur Dhama	5000m T11	NA		16:33:88	Bronze
Gyanendra Singh	100m T42	NA		DNS	NA
Avnil Kumar	200m T13	NA		23.88	Silver
Avnil Kumar	400m T13	NA		53.98	Gold
Ramkaran Singh	1500m T13	NA		16:15:47 AS	Gold
Ramkaran Singh	5000m T13	NA		DSQ	NA

==== Field Events ====
Athletes	Event	Final	Result
Sunil Phogat	Shot Put F55/56	7.50	4th
Sunil Phogat	Discus Throw F54-56	28.82	4th
Sunil Phogat	Javelin Throw F55/56	25.70	Bronze
Sandeep Singh Maan	Long Jump T47	5.80	5th
R. T. Prasanna Kumar	Javelin Throw F42/44	46.59	Gold
Ranbir Narender	Javelin Throw F42/44	49.15	Bronze
Devendra Jhajharia	Javelin Throw F46	55.35	Gold
Devendra Jhajharia	Discus Throw F46	33.67	Bronze
Amit Kumar Saroha	Club Throw F31/32/51	23.27	Gold
Amit Kumar Saroha	Discus Throw F51-53	9.87	Silver
Pydiramu Kottinti	Club Throw F31/32/51	18.51	Bronze
Pydiramu Kottinti	Discus Throw F51-53	DNS	NA
Gyanendra Singh	Long Jump T42/44	4.53	5th
Arvind	Discus Throw F37/38	30.51	Gold
Arvind	Javelin Throw F37/38	45.34	Bronze
Jaideep	Discus Throw F42	37.75	Gold
Jaideep	Shot Put F42/44	10.05	4th
Santhamuthuvel Kesavan	Discus Throw F44	38.13	Gold
Santhamuthuvel Kesavan	Shot Put F42/44	11.84	Silver
Varun Singh Bhati	High Jump T42-47	1.82 AS	Gold
Girisha Nagarajegowda	High Jump T42-47	1.65	4th

=== Women ===
==== Field Events ====
Athletes	Event	Final	Result
Karam Jyoti	Javelin Throw F55/56	11.62	Bronze
Karam Jyoti	Shot Put F52-55	DNS	NA
Karam Jyoti	Discus Throw F54-57	18.91	Silver
Deepa Malik	Shot Put F52-55	4.04	Silver
Deepa Malik	Javelin Throw F53/54	8.98	Gold
