= Athletics at the 2017 ASEAN Para Games =

- Venue: Bukit Jalil National Stadium
- Date: 18–22 September 2017

Paralympic athletics at the 2017 ASEAN Para Games was held at Bukit Jalil National Stadium at the National Sports Complex in Kuala Lumpur, Malaysia.

== Medal tally ==
* Host nation (Malaysia)

| Rank | Nation | Gold | Silver | Bronze | Total |
|---|---|---|---|---|---|
| 1 | Indonesia (INA) | 40 | 28 | 17 | 85 |
| 2 | Malaysia (MAS)* | 36 | 27 | 30 | 93 |
| 3 | Thailand (THA) | 26 | 33 | 31 | 90 |
| 4 | Vietnam (VIE) | 17 | 24 | 28 | 69 |
| 5 | Philippines (PHI) | 9 | 5 | 6 | 20 |
| 6 | Myanmar (MYA) | 3 | 6 | 4 | 13 |
| 7 | Timor-Leste (TLS) | 2 | 0 | 0 | 2 |
| 8 | Brunei (BRU) | 1 | 3 | 5 | 9 |
| 9 | Cambodia (CAM) | 0 | 3 | 4 | 7 |
| 10 | Singapore (SGP) | 0 | 3 | 0 | 3 |
| Totals (10 entries) | | 134 | 132 | 125 | 391 |

== Medalists ==
=== Men ===
| Event | Class | Gold | Silver | Bronze |
|---|---|---|---|---|
| 100 m | T11 | Abdul Halim Dalimunte; Indonesia | Watbok Peerapon; Thailand | Suphachai Songphinit; Thailand |
| 200 m | T11 | Abdul Halim Dalimunte; Indonesia | Suphachai Songphinit; Thailand | Watbok Peerapon; Thailand |
| 400 m | T11 | Suphachai Songphinit; Thailand | Nguyễn Ngọc Hiệp; Vietnam | Watbok Peerapon; Thailand |
| 100 m | T12 | Muhamad Afiq Ali Hanafiah; Malaysia | Chaiya Som-dech; Thailand | Wongngoen Amnat; Thailand |
| 200 m | T12 | Muhamad Afiq Ali Hanafiah; Malaysia | Wongngoen Amnat; Thailand | Chaiya Som-dech; Thailand |
| 400 m | T12 | Nguyễn Hoàng Minh; Vietnam | Nguyễn Văn Bình; Vietnam | Chaiya Som-dech; Thailand |
| 800 m | T12 | Nguyễn Hoàng Minh; Vietnam | Nguyễn Văn Bình; Vietnam | Agustinus Tinabela; Indonesia |
| Long jump | T11/12 | Jonathan Wong Kar Gee; Malaysia | Mohamad Saifuddin Ishak; Malaysia | Punthong Jakkit; Thailand |
| 100 m | T13 | Lamsan Songwut; Thailand | Faizal Aideal Suhaimi; Malaysia | Chakkrawan Premruedichaisak; Thailand |
| 200 m | T13 | Lamsan Songwut; Thailand | Faizal Aideal Suhaimi; Malaysia | Chakkrawan Premruedichaisak; Thailand |
| 400 m | T13 | M Zulhaizat Zainal Abidin; Malaysia | Chakkrawan Premruedichaisak; Thailand | Trần Mạnh Tùng; Vietnam |
| 1500 m | T12/13 | Nguyễn Hoàng Minh; Vietnam | Agustinus Tinabela; Indonesia | A Charoenram; Thailand |
| 5000 m | T12/13 | Agustinus Tinabela; Indonesia | Nguyễn Hoàng Minh; Vietnam | none awarded |
| 400 m | T20 | Nasharuddin Mohd; Malaysia | Felipus Kolymau; Indonesia | Endi Nurdin Tine; Indonesia |
| 800 m | T20 | Endi Nurdin Tine; Indonesia | Muhamad Nurdin Ibrahim; Malaysia | Junniw Uthai; Thailand |
| 1500 m | T20 | Junniw Uthai; Thailand | Muhamad Nurdin Ibrahim; Malaysia | Nasrodin; Indonesia |
| 5000 m | T20 | Junniw Uthai; Thailand | Nasrodin; Indonesia | Muhamad Nurdin Ibrahim; Malaysia |
| Long jump | T20 | Abdul Latif Romly; Malaysia | Suhairi Suhani; Singapore | Zulkifly Abdullah; Malaysia |
| 100 m | T36 | Muhamad Agung Laksana; Indonesia | Mohd Raduan Emeari; Malaysia | Muhammad Alif Malek; Malaysia |
| 200 m | T36 | Mohamad Ridzuan Mohamad Puzi; Malaysia | Muhamad Agung Laksana; Indonesia | Mohd Rezza Rashid; Malaysia |
| 400 m | T36 | Muhamad Agung Laksana; Indonesia | Mohd Raduan Emeari; Malaysia | Mohd Rezza Rashid; Malaysia |
| 100 m | T37 | Eddy Bernard; Malaysia | Jacklon Ganding; Malaysia | Lê Văn Mạnh; Vietnam |
| 200 m | T37 | Lê Văn Mạnh; Vietnam | Sakphet Saewang; Thailand | Jacklon Ganding; Malaysia |
| 400 m | T37 | Apisit Taprom; Thailand | Lê Văn Mạnh; Vietnam | Sakphet Saewang; Thailand |
| 800 m | T37 | Apisit Taprom; Thailand | Sakphet Saewang; Thailand | Timin; Indonesia |
| 1500 m | T37 | Apisit Taprom; Thailand | Timin; Indonesia | Muhammad Johan Abd Rahman; Malaysia |
| Long jump | T37 | Eddy Bernard; Malaysia | Trương Tấn Hiển; Vietnam | Nguyễn Hữu Thịnh; Vietnam |
| 100 m | T38 | Saptoyoga Purnomo; Indonesia | Nathayod Chaikhan; Thailand | Mohamad Erwan Hasnoor; Malaysia |
| 200 m | T38 | Saptoyoga Purnomo; Indonesia | Nathayod Chaikhan; Thailand | Surasak Damchoom; Thailand |
| 400 m | T38 | Teofilo Freitas; Timor-Leste | Surasak Damchoom; Thailand | Abdul Halim Badruddin; Malaysia |
| 800 m | T38 | Teofilo Freitas; Timor-Leste | Surasak Damchoom; Thailand | Abdul Halim Badruddin; Malaysia |
| Long jump | T38 | Mohamad Erwan Hasnoor; Malaysia | Saptoyoga Purnomo; Indonesia | Amir Firdauss Jamaluddin; Malaysia |
| 100 m | T42/43/44 | Thavanesvaran Subramaniam; Malaysia | Rasyidi; Indonesia | Uamsamut Suthis; Thailand |
| 200 m | T42/43/44 | Thavanesvaran Subramaniam; Malaysia | Kyaw Kyaw Win; Myanmar | Rasyidi; Indonesia |
| 400 m | T44 | Thavanesvaran Subramaniam; Malaysia | Kyaw Kyaw Win; Myanmar | Chim Phan; Cambodia |
| Long jump | T42/44 | Rasyidi; Indonesia | Wagiyo; Indonesia | Saiful Dawang; Malaysia |
| 100 m | T45/46 | Ahmad Solihim Mohd Nor; Malaysia | Phùng Đình Tu; Vietnam | Mai Anh Minh; Vietnam |
| 200 m | T45/46 | Erens Sabandar; Indonesia | Ahmad Solihim Mohd Nor; Malaysia | Phùng Đình Tu; Vietnam |
| 400 m | T46 | Erens Sabandar; Indonesia | Muhamad Ashraf Haisham; Malaysia | Phùng Đình Tu; Vietnam |
| 800 m | T46 | Muhamad Ashraf Haisham; Malaysia | Trần Văn Đức; Vietnam | Raul Quilang Angoluan; Philippines |
| 1500 m | T46 | Muhamad Ashraf Haisham; Malaysia | Trần Văn Đức; Vietnam | Erens Sabandar; Indonesia |
| Triple jump | T46 | Setyo Budi Hartanto; Indonesia | Eryanto Bahtiar; Malaysia | Chanaboon Angkarn; Thailand |
| 100 m | T47 | Nur Ferry Pradana; Indonesia | Arman Pila Dino; Philippines | Martin Losu; Indonesia |
| 200 m | T47 | Nur Ferry Pradana; Indonesia | Rizal Bagus Saktyono; Indonesia | Arman Pila Dino; Philippines |
| 400 m | T47 | Nur Ferry Pradana; Indonesia | Arman Pila Dino; Philippines | Yamee Sutat; Thailand |
| Long jump | T46/47 | Setyo Budi Hartanto; Indonesia | Eryanto Bahtiar; Malaysia | Chaiwat Sirimongkhol; Thailand |
| 4 × 100 m relay | T42–47 | Indonesia; Rasyidi; Nur Ferry Pradana; Wagiyo; Rizal Bagus Saktyono | Malaysia; Thavanesvaran Subramaniam; Ahmad Solihim Mohd Nor; Saiful Dawang; Eryanto Bahtiar | Vietnam; Nguyễn Hoàng Minh; Mai Anh Minh; Trần Văn Cường; Phùng Đình Tu |
| 4 × 400 m relay | T42–47 | Indonesia; Erens Sabandar; Wagiyo; Mega Amir Sidik; Martin Losu | Cambodia; Bong Hong; Nhork Kimhor; Uk Samphors; Chim Phan | Thailand; Uamsamut Suthis; Chaiwat Sirimongkhol; Kotcharang Denpoom; Yamee Sutat |
| 100 m | T52/53 | Pongsakorn Paeyo; Thailand | Pichet Krungget; Thailand | Sopa Intasen; Thailand |
| 200 m | T52/53 | Pichet Krungget; Thailand | Sopa Intasen; Thailand | Jirawat Saksiripong; Thailand |
| 400 m | T52/53 | Pongsakorn Paeyo; Thailand | Jirawat Saksiripong; Thailand | Sopa Intasen; Thailand |
| 800 m | T53 | Pongsakorn Paeyo; Thailand | Jirawat Saksiripong; Thailand | Pichet Krungget; Thailand |
| 100 m | T54 | Saichon Konjen; Thailand | Jaenal Aripin; Indonesia | Van Vun; Cambodia |
| 200 m | T54 | Saichon Konjen; Thailand | Jaenal Aripin; Indonesia | Heng Savoeun; Cambodia |
| 400 m | T54 | Saichon Konjen; Thailand | Rawat Tana; Thailand | Jaenal Aripin; Indonesia |
| 800 m | T54 | Rawat Tana; Thailand | Heng Savoeun; Cambodia | none awarded |
| 1500 m | T54 | Doni Yulianto; Indonesia | none awarded | none awarded |
| Shot put | F11/12 | Boonsri Phichai; Thailand | K Roongsereekul; Thailand | Wongngoen Arnon; Thailand |
| Discus throw | F11 | Boonsri Phichai; Thailand | Evaristo Carbonel; Philippines | Wongngoen Arnon; Thailand |
| Discus throw | F12 | Juntinmatorn Wasun; Thailand | Mohamad Firdaus; Malaysia | none awarded |
| Javelin throw | F11 | Wongngoen Arnon; Thailand | Boonsri Phichai; Thailand | Matin Dawat; Brunei |
| Javelin throw | F12/13 | Mohd Hisham Khaironi; Malaysia | Juntinmatorn Wasun; Thailand | none awarded |
| Shot put | F20 | Muhammad Ziyad Zolkefli; Malaysia | Mohamad Aliff Awi; Malaysia | Sanepoot Boonkong; Thailand |
| Shot put | F32/33/34 | Adderin Majurin; Malaysia | Võ Văn Tùng; Vietnam | Davis Machang; Malaysia |
| Discus throw | F34 | Võ Văn Tùng; Vietnam | Davis Machang; Malaysia | Adderin Majurin; Malaysia |
| Javelin throw | F34 | Võ Văn Tùng; Vietnam | Davis Machang; Malaysia | Adderin Majurin; Malaysia |
| Shot put | F35 | Bajury Ladis; Malaysia | Alihan Muda; Brunei | Sabarudding Bacho; Malaysia |
| Discus throw | F35 | Alihan Muda; Brunei | Sabarudding Bacho; Malaysia | Zainul Wardi Hj Tarip; Brunei |
| Javelin throw | F35 | Mohd Rozi Mat Hasin; Malaysia | Sabarudding Bacho; Malaysia | Bajury Ladis; Malaysia |
| Shot put | F36 | Shamli Waidi; Malaysia | none awarded | none awarded |
| Shot put | F37 | Ahmad Fauzi; Indonesia | Muhammad Hafiz Abu Bakar; Malaysia | Tomson Lim Kok Hong; Malaysia |
| Discus throw | F36/37 | Muhammad Hafiz Abu Bakar; Malaysia | Shamli Waidi; Malaysia | Ahmad Fauzi; Indonesia |
| Javelin throw | F36/37 | Shamli Waidi; Malaysia | Ahmad Fauzi; Indonesia | Tomson Lim Kok Hong; Malaysia |
| Shot put | F40/41 | Trần Văn Nguyên; Vietnam | Muhammad Diroy Noordin; Singapore | Richard Bada; Malaysia |
| Javelin throw | F40/41 | Trần Văn Nguyên; Vietnam | Muhammad Diroy Noordin; Singapore | Richard Bada; Malaysia |
| Shot put | F42/43 | Klangam Sawai; Thailand | Sutarno; Indonesia | Tin Nyo; Myanmar |
| Discus throw | F42/43 | Vương Châu; Vietnam | Sutarno; Indonesia | Tin Nyo; Myanmar |
| Javelin throw | F42 | Tin Nyo; Myanmar | Dapiel Bayage; Indonesia | Sutarno; Indonesia |
| Shot put | F44 | Myo Swe; Myanmar | Yahya; Indonesia | Phan Văn Dũng; Vietnam |
| Discus throw | F44 | Yahya; Indonesia | Phan Văn Dũng; Vietnam | Yohanis Bili; Indonesia |
| Javelin throw | F43/44 | Yohanis Bili; Indonesia | Phan Văn Dũng; Vietnam | Soe Than; Myanmar |
| Shot put | F46 | Priyano; Indonesia | Aung Phone Myat; Myanmar | Hisam Che Soh; Malaysia |
| Javelin throw | F46 | Rizal Bagus Saktyono; Indonesia | Chanaboon Angkarn; Thailand | Priyano; Indonesia |
| Shot put | F54/55 | Aung Khum; Myanmar | Jap Soon Hung; Malaysia | Joel Adegue Balatucan; Philippines |
| Discus throw | F55 | Riadi Saputra; Indonesia | Kiều Minh Trung; Vietnam | Phan Minh Vương; Vietnam |
| Javelin throw | F55 | Kiều Minh Trung; Vietnam | Riadi Saputra; Indonesia | Shari Haji Juma'at; Brunei |
| Shot put | F56 | Faridul Masri; Malaysia | Trịnh Công Luận; Vietnam | Phanpinit Sommay; Thailand |
| Discus throw | F56 | Trịnh Công Luận; Vietnam | Hirdan Abdul Kadi; Brunei | none awarded |
| Javelin throw | F56 | Faridul Masri; Malaysia | Trịnh Công Luận; Vietnam | Hirdan Abdul Kadi; Brunei |
| Shot put | F57 | Alan Sastra; Indonesia | Sakchai Yimbanchang; Thailand | Nguyễn Bé Hậu; Vietnam |
| Discus throw | F57 | Alan Sastra; Indonesia | Cao Ngọc Hùng; Vietnam | Nguyễn Bé Hậu; Vietnam |
| Javelin throw | F57 | Cao Ngọc Hùng; Vietnam | Sakchai Yimbanchang; Thailand | Alan Sastra; Indonesia |

=== Women ===
| Event | Class | Gold | Silver | Bronze |
|---|---|---|---|---|
| 100 m | T11 | Kewalin Wannaruemon; Thailand | Susan Unggu; Indonesia | Sirirat Riangraiwilatkheeree; Thailand |
| 200 m | T11 | Kewalin Wannaruemon; Thailand | Susan Unggu; Indonesia | Sirirat Riangraiwilatkheeree; Thailand |
| 100 m | T12 | Endang Sari Sitorus; Indonesia | Suneeporn Tanomwong; Thailand | Nguyễn Ngọc Quỳnh Trâm; Vietnam |
| 200 m | T12 | Suneeporn Tanomwong; Thailand | Nguyễn Ngọc Quỳnh Trâm; Vietnam | none awarded |
| 400 m | T11/12 | Kewalin Wannaruemon; Thailand | Nguyễn Ngọc Quỳnh Trâm; Vietnam | Susan Unggu; Indonesia |
| Long jump | T12 | Endang Sari Sitorus; Indonesia | Nur Suraiya Zamri; Malaysia | Vũ Thị Kim Thúy; Vietnam |
| 100 m | T13 | Putri Aulia; Indonesia | Ni Made Arianti Putri; Indonesia | Felicia Mikat; Malaysia |
| 200 m | T13 | Putri Aulia; Indonesia | Ni Made Arianti Putri; Indonesia | Felicia Mikat; Malaysia |
| 400 m | T13 | Putri Aulia; Indonesia | Ni Made Arianti Putri; Indonesia | Felicia Mikat; Malaysia |
| 400 m | T20 | Siti Noor Iasah Mohamad Ariffin; Malaysia | Tiwa; Indonesia | Nur Alia Ardiela Natasya Ibrahim; Malaysia |
| 800 m | T20 | Siti Noor Iasah Mohamad Ariffin; Malaysia | Maswinah Suanang; Malaysia | Phoophaploy Wipha; Thailand |
| Long jump | T20 | Siti Noor Radiah Ismail; Malaysia | Nani Shahiera Zawawi; Malaysia | Tiwa; Indonesia |
| 100 m | T36 | Insan Nurhaida; Indonesia | Suphatsara Luyue; Thailand | Trần Thị Văn; Vietnam |
| 200 m | T36 | Insan Nurhaida; Indonesia | Suphatsara Luyue; Thailand | Trần Thị Văn; Vietnam |
| 100 m | T44 | Maria Cielo Dimain Honasan; Philippines | Karisma Evi Tiarani; Indonesia | Nguyễn Thị Thúy; Vietnam |
| 200 m | T44 | Maria Cielo Dimain Honasan; Philippines | Karisma Evi Tiarani; Indonesia | Nguyễn Thị Thúy; Vietnam |
| 400 m | T44/46 | Maria Cielo Dimain Honasan; Philippines | Gagun Pagjiraporn; Thailand | Vet Chantha; Cambodia |
| Long jump | T44 | Karisma Evi Tiarani; Indonesia | Vet Chantha; Cambodia | Lại Thị Ngọc Ánh; Vietnam |
| 100 m | T46/47 | Nanda Mei Sholihah; Indonesia | Gagun Pagjiraporn; Thailand | Nurul Fazirai Mat Hussin; Malaysia |
| 200 m | T46/47 | Nanda Mei Sholihah; Indonesia | Gagun Pagjiraporn; Thailand | Nandar Lin; Myanmar |
| 400 m | T47 | Nanda Mei Sholihah; Indonesia | Nandar Lin; Myanmar | none awarded |
| 100 m | T52/53/54 | Prudencia del Mundo Panaligan; Philippines | Chainet Srithong; Thailand | Nguyễn Thị Xuân Anh; Vietnam |
| 200 m | T53/54 | Prudencia del Mundo Panaligan; Philippines | Tpat Chatyotsakorn; Thailand | Nguyễn Thị Xuân Anh; Vietnam |
| 400 m | T53/54 | Tpat Chatyotsakorn; Thailand | Chainet Srithong; Thailand | Pranaya Sekratok; Thailand |
| Shot put | F11/12 | Hemala Devi Eni Kutty; Malaysia | Jeanette Aceveda; Philippines | Dyg Nor Hensan Hj Mataha; Brunei |
| Discus throw | F12 | Hemala Devi Eni Kutty; Malaysia | Dyg Nor Hensan Hj Mataha; Brunei | Noor Kalsum Fadil; Malaysia |
| Javelin throw | F12 | Rosalie Quiño Torrefiel; Philippines | Hemala Devi Eni Kutty; Malaysia | Vũ Thị Kim Thúy; Vietnam |
| Shot put | F20 | Suparni Yati; Indonesia | Nursuhana Ramlan; Malaysia | Noor Imanina Idris; Malaysia |
| Shot put | F37 | Umi Syuhadah Idris; Malaysia | Hà Thị Huệ; Vietnam | Nguyễn Thị Mai; Vietnam |
| Discus throw | F37 | Umi Syuhadah Idris; Malaysia | Hà Thị Huệ; Vietnam | Nguyễn Thị Mai; Vietnam |
| Javelin throw | F37 | Umi Syuhadah Idris; Malaysia | Nguyễn Thị Mai; Vietnam | Hà Thị Huệ; Vietnam |
| Shot put | F42/44 | Doriah Poulus; Malaysia | Warmia Marto Samidi; Indonesia | Võ Thị Thu Thuận; Vietnam |
| Discus throw | F42/43/44 | Warmia Marto Samidi; Indonesia | Võ Thị Thu Thuận; Vietnam | Doriah Poulus; Malaysia |
| Javelin throw | F42/44 | Doriah Poulus; Malaysia | Warmia Marto Samidi; Indonesia | Võ Thị Thu Thuận; Vietnam |
| Shot put | F54 | Cendy Asusano; Philippines | Nguyễn Thị Ngọc Thủy; Vietnam | Marites Domingo Burce; Philippines |
| Discus throw | F54 | Cendy Asusano; Philippines | Trần Thị Tú; Vietnam | Marites Domingo Burce; Philippines |
| Shot put | F55 | Trương Bích Vân; Vietnam | Htet Htet Aye; Myanmar | Ngô Thị Lan Thành; Vietnam |
| Discus throw | F55 | Trương Bích Vân; Vietnam | Htet Htet Aye; Myanmar | Jesebel Tordecilla; Philippines |
| Javelin throw | F54/55 | Cendy Asusano; Philippines | Jesebel Tordecilla; Philippines | Ngô Thị Lan Thành; Vietnam |
| Shot put | F56/57 | Nguyễn Thị Hải; Vietnam | Puangpet Chaithongrat; Thailand | Seriwati; Indonesia |
| Discus throw | F56/57 | Nguyễn Thị Hải; Vietnam | Puangpet Chaithongrat; Thailand | Seriwati; Indonesia |
| Javelin throw | F56/57 | Nguyễn Thị Hải; Vietnam | Seriwati; Indonesia | Puangpet Chaithongrat; Thailand |

== See also ==
- Athletics at the 2017 Southeast Asian Games
- Athletics at the 2018 Asian Para Games
