= IPC Athletic Asia-Oceania Championship 2016 =

The Men's 400 meter Race at the IPC Athletics Asia-Oceania Championship 2016 was held at the Dubai Police Club Stadium in Dubai from 7–12 March.

== Results ==
Legend

AS: Asian Record

WR: World Record

PB: Personal Best

SB: Season Best

Fn-False Start

Q- Qualified for Finals

q- Qualified for Finals as per best performance

DNF- Did Not Finish

DSQ- Disqualified

=== T12 ===
==== Final ====
Date- 08:March:2016 Time- 17:03

wind: 0.0
Rank	Name	Reaction Time	Finish Time
1.	SONGPHINIT Suphachai (T11)Guide KHAODEE Wanchai Thailand (THA)	-	55.15
2.	KHOSRAVI Arash (T11)Guide MARGHASHI Javad Iran (IRI)	-	57.99
3.	Ankur Dhama (T11)Guide Vipin Kumar India (IND)	-	58.46

== T13 ==
=== Final ===
Date- 12:March:2016 Time- 18:52

wind: 0.0
Rank	Name	Reaction Time	Finish Time
1.	Avil Kumar (T13) India (IND)	-	53.98
2.	Islam Salimov (T13) Kazakhstan (KAZ)	-	55.06
3.	Mahdi Moradikoochi (T13) Iran (IRI)	-	DNF

=== T20 ===
==== Heat ====
Date- 10:March:2016 Time- 18:26

wind: 0.0
Rank	Name	Reaction Time	Finish Time
1.	MOHD Nasharuddin (T20) Malaysia (MAS)	0.604	52.57 Q
2.	KURAMOTO Tsubasa (T20) Japan (JPN)	0.301	53.56Q
3.	RANGI Ethan (T20) New Zealand (NZL)	0.194	55.62Q
4.	ABDULRAHEEM Abdulla Mohamed (T20) New Zealand (NZL)	0.268	1.03.10q
5.	Fong Chi Fong (T20) Macau (MAC)	0.653	1.13.91
