= IPC Athletic Asia-Oceania Championship 2016 – Men's 200 metres =

The Men's 200 meter Race at the IPC Athletics Asia-Oceania Championship 2016 was held at the Dubai Police Club Stadium in Dubai from 7–12 March.

== Results ==
Legend

AS: Asian Record

WR: World Record

PB: Personal Best

SB: Season Best

Fn-False Start

Q- Qualified for Finals

q- Qualified for Finals as per best performance

DNF- Did Not Finish

DSQ- Disqualified

=== T11 ===
==== Final ====
Date- 12:March:2016

Time- 16:51

Wind -0.9
Rank	Name	Reaction Time	Finish Time
1.	Arash Khosarvi(T11) Guide Javed Marghashi; Iran (IRI)	0.175; 0.165	24.64
2.	Abdul Halim Dalimunte(T11) Guide Permana Emanuel Anjar; Indonesia (INA)	0.181; 0.206	25.53
3.	Suphachai Songphinit(T11) Guide Wanchai Khaodee; Iran (IRI)	0.290; 0.206	DSQ; IPC Rule 19.4

=== T13 ===
==== Final ====
Date- 09:March:2016

Time- 18:55

Wind -0.1
Rank	Name	Reaction Time	Finish Time
1.	Liu Wei(T13) China (CHN)	0.316	23.02
2.	Avnil Kumar(T13) India (IND)	0.222	23.88
3.	Islam Salimov(T13) China (CHN)	0.245	24.70
4.	Mahdi Maradikoochi(T13) Iran (IRI)	0.265	DSQ; IPC Rule 18.5a

=== T34 ===
==== Final ====
Date- 07:March:2016 Time- 18:05

wind: -0.1
Rank	Name	Reaction Time	Finish Time
1.	HAMMADI Mohamed (T34) United Arab Emirates (UAE)	-	29.32
2.	ALMUTAIRI Ahmad (T33) Kuwait (KUW)	-	30.86
3.	AL-KUBAISI Mohammed Rashid A J (T34) Qatar (QAT)	-	32.79
4.	AL-HAJRI Khalid Hamad (T34) Qatar (QAT)	-	38.82
5.	SALEH Naser (T33) Kuwait (KUW)	-	56.15

=== T35/36/38 ===
==== Final ====
Date- 11:March:2016

Time- 17:28

Wind +0.5
Rank	Name	Reaction Time	Finish Time
1.	Abbas Al Darraji(T38) Iraq (IRQ)	-	24.68
2.	Chan Wing Sum(T36) Hong Kong (HKG)	-	29.81
3.	Yuen Ka Nin(T36) Hong Kong (HKG)	-	30.32
4.	Xin Ming(T35) China (CHN)	-	33.75
5.	Khalifa Abdulla Al-Dosari(T35) Qatar (QAT)	-	34.44

=== T37 ===
==== Final ====
Date- 11:March:2016

Time- 17:22

Wind -0.3
Rank	Name	Reaction Time	Finish Time
1.	Sakphet Saewang(T37) Thailand (THA)	-	27.47
2.	Saud Alwani(T37) Saudi Arabia (KSA)	-	27.71
3.	Ahmadreza Alikhani Fardonbeh(T37) Iran (IRI)	-	29.45
4.	Akram Albsi(T37) Saudi Arabia (KSA)	-	30.73

=== T42 ===
==== Final ====
Date- 07:March:2016 Time- 17:25

wind: 0.0
Rank	Name	Reaction Time	Finish Time
1.	YODHA PEDIGE Anil Prasanna Jayalath (T42) Sri Lanka (SRI)	-	25.12 AS
2.	YAMAMOTO Atsushi (T42) Japan (JPN)	-	26.84
3.	INDRAPALA Buddika (T42) Sri Lanka (SRI)	-	27.51
4.	MORAPAT Tawatchai (T42) Thailand (THA)	-	30.38
5.	ALFIFI Abdullah (T42) Saudi Arabia (KSA)	-	32.95
6.	DURANI Mohammad Naiem (T42) Afghanistan (AFG)	-	37.75

=== T44 ===
==== Final ====
Date- 07:March:2016 Time- 17:32

wind: -0.3
Rank	Name	Reaction Time	Finish Time
1.	Manoj Baskar (T44) India (IND)	-	24.91
2.	Anand Gunasekaran (T44) India (IND)	-	24.95
3.	HETTIARACHCHI Ajith (T44) Sri Lanka (SRI)	-	25.06

=== T47 ===
==== Heat 1/2 ====
Date- 07:March:2016 Time- 17:05

wind: +0.4
Rank	Name	Reaction Time	Finish Time	Results
1.	Sandeep Singh (T46) India (IND)	-	23.04	Q
2.	RATHNAYAKA Kamal (T47) Sri Lanka (SRI)	-	23.83	Q
3.	ALBLOOSHI Yahya (T46) United Arab Emirates (UAE)	-	24.11	Q
4.	BALEIBAU Epeli (T47) Fiji (FIJ)	-	27.33	q

==== Heat 2/2 ====
Date- 07:March:2016 Time- 17:12

wind: 0.0
Rank	Name	Reaction Time	Finish Time	Results
1.	OJAGHLOU Ahmad (T46) Iran (IRI)	-	22.47	Q
2.	UGGL DENA PATHIRANNEHELAGE Pradeep (T46) Sri Lanka (SRI)	-	23.67	Q
3.	HE Haican (T47) China (CHN)	-	23.80	Q
4.	LOSU Marthin (T47) Indonesia (INA)	-	23.99	q
5.	KHOSHBIN Abdul Maqssoud (T46) Afghanistan (AFG)	-	F1	DSQ (IPC Rule 17.7)

==== Final ====
Date- 08:March:2016 Time- 17:28

wind: 0.0
Rank	Name	Reaction Time	Finish Time
1.	OJAGHLOU Ahmad (T46) Iran (IRI)	-	22.59
2.	Sandeep Singh (T46) India (IND)	-	22.85
3.	HE Haican (T47) China (CHN)	-	23.01
4.	UGGL DENA PATHIRANNEHELAGE Pradeep (T46) Sri Lanka (SRI)	-	23.38
5.	RATHNAYAKA Kamal (T47) Sri Lanka (SRI)	-	23.83
6.	LOSU Marthin (T47) Indonesia (INA)	-	23.99
7.	ALBLOOSHI Yahya (T46) United Arab Emirates (UAE)	-	24.01
8.	BALEIBAU Epeli (T47) Fiji (FIJ)	-	27.85

=== T53 ===
==== Final ====
Date- 10:March:2016

Time- 16:45

Wind -1.1
Rank	Name	Reaction Time	Finish Time
1.	Hamad Aladwani(T53) Kuwait (KUW)	-	28.09
2.	Fahad Alganaidl(T53) Saudi Arabia (KSA)	-	28.49
3.	Enkhmanlai Purevtsog(T53) Mongolia (MGL)	-	30.69
4.	Naseib Areidat(T53) United Arab Emirates (UAE)	-	35.93

=== T54 ===
==== Final ====
Date- 10:March:2016

Time- 17:02

Wind +0.1
Rank	Name	Reaction Time	Finish Time
1.	Salem Alshehhi(T54) United Arab Emirates (UAE)	-	27.06
2.	Rashed Aldhaheri(T54) United Arab Emirates (UAE)	-	27.37
3.	Yuki Nishi(T54) Japan (JPN)	-	27.43
4.	Jamaan Alzahrani(T54) Saudi Arabia (KSA)	-	28.04
