= IPC Athletic Asia-Oceania Championship 2016 – Men's javelin throw =

The Men's javelin throw at the IPC Athletics Asia-Oceania Championship 2016 was held at the Dubai Police Club Stadium in Dubai from 7–12 March.

== Results ==
Legend

AS: Asian Record

WR: World Record

PB: Personal Best

SB: Season Best

=== F55/56 Final ===
Date- 07:March:2016

Time- 18:03

Rank	Name	Attempt 1	Attempt 2	Attempt 3	Attempt 4	Attempt 5	Attempt 6
1.	NAAS Ahmed (F40) Iraq (IRQ)	X	33.12 (953)	X	35.75 (1017)	X	33.45 (962)
2.	NUKHAILAWI Wildan (F41) Iraq (IRQ)	X	38.02 (844)	41.07 (926)	37.84 (839)	X	X
3.	SHEN Tongqing (F41) China (CHN)	37.54 (830)	35.29 (756)	32.63 (657)	34.92 (743)	35.02 (747)	35.31 (757)
4.	BEIT SAYAH Sadegh (F41) Iran (IRI)	X	33.50 (691)	32.83 (665)	31.17 (598)	X	31.42 (608)
5.	ALSAIF Abdullah (F40) Kuwait (KUW)	X	22.46 (489)	X	22.90 (514)	22.50 (492)	X
6.	WANG Wei (F40) China (CHN)	15.88 (151)	20.26 (366)	20.79 (396)	X	16.95 (196)	17.59 (226)
7.	LUKUTIN Alexey (F40) Kazakhstan (KAZ)	17.18 (207)	X	16.16 (162)	X	X	X
