= Nanda Mei Sholihah =

Indonesian para sprinter (born 1999)

Personal information
- Nationality: Indonesian
- Born: 17 May 1999 (age 27) Kediri, East Java, Indonesia

Sport
- Country: Indonesia
- Sport: Paralympic athletics
- Disability class: T47
- Event: Sprint
Medal record
Women's para-athletics
Representing Indonesia
World Championships
| Silver medal – second place | 2025 New Delhi | Universal 4 × 100 m relay |
Asian Para Games
| Silver medal – second place | 2022 Hangzhou | 4×100 m universal relay |
ASEAN Para Games
| Gold medal – first place | 2014 Naypyidaw | 100 m T46/57 |
| Gold medal – first place | 2014 Naypyidaw | 200 m T46/57 |
| Gold medal – first place | 2015 Singapore | 100 m T46/57 |
| Gold medal – first place | 2015 Singapore | 200 m T46/57 |
| Gold medal – first place | 2015 Singapore | 400 m T46/57 |
| Gold medal – first place | 2017 Kuala Lumpur | 100 m T46/57 |
| Gold medal – first place | 2017 Kuala Lumpur | 200 m T46/57 |
| Gold medal – first place | 2017 Kuala Lumpur | 400 m T46/57 |
| Gold medal – first place | 2022 Surakarta | 100 m T46/57 |
| Gold medal – first place | 2022 Surakarta | 200 m T46/57 |
| Gold medal – first place | 2022 Surakarta | 400 m T46/57 |
| Silver medal – second place | 2023 Cambodia | 100 m T47 |
| Silver medal – second place | 2023 Cambodia | 200 m T47 |
| Silver medal – second place | 2023 Cambodia | 400 m T46/47 |
| Bronze medal – third place | 2014 Naypyidaw | 400 m T46/57 |
Asian Youth Para Games
| Gold medal – first place | 2013 Kuala Lumpur | 100 m T47 |
| Gold medal – first place | 2013 Kuala Lumpur | 200 m T47 |
| Gold medal – first place | 2013 Kuala Lumpur | 400 m T47 |
- Updated on 5 October 2025

Nanda Mei Sholihah (born 17 May 1999) is an Indonesian para sprinter. Having no right forearm, she competes in the T47 classification. Sholihah has won medals for Indonesia at the ASEAN Para Games, Asian Para Games, and the World Para Athletics Championships.

== Early life ==
Nanda Mei Sholihah was born in Kediri, East Java on 17 May 1999, the daughter of Supriyanto and Rini Suwarni. She started competing in athletics at the age of 11.

== Career ==
Sholihah competed in the 2013 Asian Youth Para Games, where she won the gold medal in the 100 m, 200 m and 400 m events in her classification. She then made her senior international debut in the 2014 ASEAN Para Games, where she won the gold medal in the 100 m and 200 m events and the bronze medal in the 400 m event. Sholihah competed in the 2015 ASEAN Para Games and won the gold medal in the 100 m, 200 m and 400 m events, a feat she repeated in the 2017 edition. She was scheduled to compete at the 2018 Asian Para Games but withdrew due to injury.

In 2022, Sholihah returned to the ASEAN Para Games and won the gold medal in the 100 m, 200 m and 400 m events once again. In the 2023 edition, she won the silver medal in the 100 m, 200 m and 400 m events, finishing behind Sasirawan Inthachot in all these occasions. She also competed in the delayed 2022 Asian Para Games and won a silver medal in the 4 × 100 m universal relay.

In 2025, Sholihah competed at the 2025 World Para Athletics Championships. In the 100 metres, she reached the final finished in sixth place. She then became part of the Indonesian team that won the silver medal in the universal 4 × 100 metres relay event, winning her first medal in the World Championships.
