= Athletics at the 2023 ASEAN Para Games =

- Venue: Morodok Techo National Stadium
- Date: 4–7 June 2023

Athletics at the 2023 ASEAN Para Games was held at Morodok Techo National Stadium in Phnom Penh, Cambodia from 4–7 June 2023.

== Medal tally ==
* Host nation (Cambodia)

Rank	Nation	Gold	Silver	Bronze	Total
1	Thailand (THA)	43	22	20	85
2	Indonesia (INA)	42	51	28	121
3	Vietnam (VIE)	20	19	20	59
4	Malaysia (MAS)	14	15	10	39
5	Myanmar (MYA)	12	13	9	34
6	Philippines (PHI)	10	10	11	31
7	Cambodia (CAM)*	6	13	25	44
8	Brunei (BRU)	3	3	2	8
9	Timor-Leste (TLS)	2	0	1	3
10	Singapore (SGP)	1	2	0	3
11	Laos (LAO)	0	0	6	6
Totals (11 entries)		153	148	132	433

== Medalists ==
Men

Event	Class	Gold	Silver	Bronze
100 m	T11	Ruli Al Kahfi Mubaroq; Indonesia	Somdech Chaiya; Thailand	Muhammad Dimas Ubaidillah; Indonesia
200 m	T11	Ruli Al Kahfi Mubaroq; Indonesia	Siwabannakorn Saokham; Thailand	Somdech Chaiya; Thailand
400 m	T11	Nguyễn Ngọc Hiệp; Vietnam	Muhammad Dimas Ubaidillah; Indonesia	Supachai Songpinij; Thailand
800 m	T11	Supachai Songpinij; Thailand	Vũ Tiến Mạnh; Vietnam	Lach Ryna; Cambodia
1500 m	T11	Supachai Songpinij; Thailand	Vũ Tiến Mạnh; Vietnam	Nun Theara; Cambodia
100 m	T12	Eko Saputra; Indonesia	Muhamad Afiq Ali Hanafiah; Malaysia	Mohamed Faizal Aideal Suhaimi; Malaysia
200 m	T12	Eko Saputra; Indonesia	Muhamad Afiq Ali Hanafiah; Malaysia	Phạm Nguyễn Khánh Minh; Vietnam
400 m	T12	Phạm Nguyễn Khánh Minh; Vietnam	Kissanapong Tisuwan; Thailand	Eko Saputra; Indonesia
800 m	T12	Kissanapong Tisuwan; Thailand	Petrus Kanel Alupan; Indonesia	Xay Latdavone; Laos
1500 m	T12	Kissanapong Tisuwan; Thailand	Nguyễn Văn Bình; Vietnam	Abel de Jesus Martins; Timor-Leste
Long jump	T11/12	Mohamad Saifuddin Ishak; Malaysia	Jolan Camacho; Philippines	Nguyễn Ngọc Hiệp; Vietnam
100 m	T13	Jakkarin Dammunee; Thailand	Muammar Habibila; Indonesia	Bounphet Thepthida; Laos
200 m	T13	Jakkarin Dammunee; Thailand	James Ethan Ang Kai Meng; Singapore	Bounphet Thepthida; Laos
400 m	T13	Jakkarin Dammunee; Thailand	James Ethan Ang Kai Meng; Singapore	Slamet Wahyu Jati; Indonesia
Long jump	T13	Muammar Habibila; Indonesia	Jonathan Wong Kar Gee; Malaysia	Ken Thepthida; Laos
400 m	T20	Muhammad Ammar Aiman Nor Azmi; Malaysia	Alfin Nomleni; Indonesia	Nasharuddin Mohammad; Malaysia
800 m	T20	Alfin Nomleni; Indonesia	Endi Nurdin Tine; Indonesia	Muhammad Ammar Aiman Nor Azmi; Malaysia
1500 m	T20	Uthai Junniw; Thailand	Muhammad Haqeem Mustaqim Husmadi; Malaysia	Muhamad Nurdin Ibrahim; Malaysia
5000 m	T20	Muhamad Nurdin Ibrahim; Malaysia	Uthai Junniw; Thailand	Nasrodin; Indonesia
Long jump	T20	Zulkifly Abdullah; Malaysia	Eljoe Gotuoh; Malaysia	Nik Mohamad Rahmat Mohd Zahari; Malaysia
200 m	T36/37	Saptoyoga Purnomo; Indonesia	Ahmad Fizzi Rosni; Malaysia	Lê Văn Mạnh; Vietnam
400 m	T36/37/38	Amornthep Phonpanna; Thailand	not awarded	not awarded
100 m	T37	Saptoyoga Purnomo; Indonesia	Ahmad Fizzi Rosni; Malaysia	Lê Văn Mạnh; Vietnam
400 m	T37	Saptoyoga Purnomo; Indonesia	Apisit Taprom; Thailand	Lê Văn Mạnh; Vietnam
Long jump	T37/38	Kullakorn Butthajee; Thailand	Muhammad Nazmi Nasri; Malaysia	Nathayod Chaikhan; Thailand
800 m	T38	Teofilo Freitas; Timor-Leste	Muhammad Faiz Haizat Rosdi; Malaysia	Surasak Damchoom; Thailand
1500 m	T38	Teofilo Freitas; Timor-Leste	Muhammad Faiz Haizat Rosdi; Malaysia	Surasak Damchoom; Thailand
100 m	T44	Partin Muhlisin; Indonesia	Ryan Arda Diarta; Indonesia	Wakhidun; Indonesia
200 m	T44	Eddy Bernard; Malaysia	Partin Muhlisin; Indonesia	Ryan Arda Diarta; Indonesia
High jump	T42/43/44	Nasip; Indonesia	Agus Kurniawan; Indonesia	Ngô Xuân Đoàn; Vietnam
Long jump	T42/43/44	Eddy Bernard; Malaysia	Partin Muhlisin; Indonesia	Ryan Arda Diarta; Indonesia
100 m	T46	Firza Faturahman Listianto; Indonesia	Phùng Đình Tú; Vietnam	Jerome Doria Fernandez; Philippines
200 m	T46	Figo Saputra; Indonesia	Firza Faturahman Listianto; Indonesia	Jerome Doria Fernandez; Philippines
400 m	T46	Figo Saputra; Indonesia	Erens Sabandar; Indonesia	Jerome Doria Fernandez; Philippines
800 m	T46	King James Teves Reyes; Philippines	Muhamad Ashraf Muhammad Haisham; Malaysia	Trần Văn Đức; Vietnam
1500 m	T46	Muhamad Ashraf Muhammad Haisham; Malaysia	King James Teves Reyes; Philippines	Trần Văn Đức; Vietnam
5000 m	T46	Muhamad Ashraf Muhammad Haisham; Malaysia	King James Teves Reyes; Philippines	Trần Văn Đức; Vietnam
High jump	T46	Van Sochen; Cambodia	Angkarn Chanaboon; Thailand	Sok Chaiya; Cambodia
Long jump	T46	Figo Saputra; Indonesia	Phạm Xuân Huy; Vietnam	Angkarn Chanaboon; Thailand
Triple jump	T46	Angkarn Chanaboon; Thailand	Phạm Xuân Huy; Vietnam	Ya Tholradeth; Cambodia
100 m	T47	Nur Ferry Pradana; Indonesia	Rizal Bagus Saktyono; Indonesia	Arvie Bernardo Arreglado; Philippines
200 m	T47	Nur Ferry Pradana; Indonesia	Rizal Bagus Saktyono; Indonesia	Arman Pila Dino; Philippines
400 m	T47	Nur Ferry Pradana; Indonesia	Arman Pila Dino; Philippines	Jakkrit Phimjun; Thailand
Long jump	T47	Chaiwat Sirimongkhol; Thailand	Arvie Bernardo Arreglado; Philippines	Bong Hong; Cambodia
Triple jump	T47	Chaiwat Sirimongkhol; Thailand	Arvie Bernardo Arreglado; Philippines	Bong Hong; Cambodia
200 m	T52	Jerrold Pete Macabio Mangliwan; Philippines	Pichaya Kurattanasiri; Thailand	not awarded
400 m	T52	Jerrold Pete Macabio Mangliwan; Philippines	Pichaya Kurattanasiri; Thailand	not awarded
100 m	T53	Pongsakorn Paeyo; Thailand	Hea Hok; Cambodia	Chhun Phun; Cambodia
200 m	T53	Pongsakorn Paeyo; Thailand	Hea Hok; Cambodia	Chhun Phun; Cambodia
400 m	T53	Pongsakorn Paeyo; Thailand	Masaberee Arsae; Thailand	Chhun Phun; Cambodia
100 m	T54	Athiwat Paeng-nuea; Thailand	Van Vun; Cambodia	Jaenal Aripin; Indonesia
200 m	T54	Athiwat Paeng-nuea; Thailand	Van Vun; Cambodia	Saichon Konjen; Thailand
400 m	T54	Athiwat Paeng-nuea; Thailand	Saichon Konjen; Thailand	Jaenal Aripin; Indonesia
Long jump	T63	Kantinan Khumphong; Thailand	not awarded	not awarded
100 m	T64	Soe Pea; Myanmar	Denpoom Kotcharang; Thailand	Aung Myint Htay; Myanmar
200 m	T64	Denpoom Kotcharang; Thailand	Soe Pea; Myanmar	Jafa Seapla; Thailand
400 m	T64	Jafa Seapla; Thailand	Maung Lin; Myanmar	Soe Pea; Myanmar
800 m	T64	Maung Lin; Myanmar	Chim Pan; Cambodia	Nhork Kimhour; Cambodia
1500 m	T64	Maung Lin; Myanmar	Chim Pan; Cambodia	Nhork Kimhour; Cambodia
Discus throw	F11	Evaristo Joven Carbonel; Philippines	Awang Raduan Awang Haji Mataha; Brunei	Vann Chamroeun; Cambodia
Javelin throw	F11	Evaristo Joven Carbonel; Philippines	Roeun Rin; Cambodia	Lach Ryna; Cambodia
Shot put	F11	Awang Raduan Awang Haji Mataha; Brunei	Sambath Samban; Cambodia	Tha Phannit Phannit; Cambodia
Discus throw	F12	Marcelino Michael; Indonesia	Wasun Juntinmatorn; Thailand	Badrul Hisam Musa; Malaysia
Javelin throw	F12	Wasun Juntinmatorn; Thailand	Marcelino Michael; Indonesia	Badrul Hisam Musa; Malaysia
Shot put	F12	Marcelino Michael; Indonesia	Badrul Hisam Musa; Malaysia	Wasun Juntinmatorn; Thailand
Discus throw	F20	Mohamad Aliff Mohamad Awi; Malaysia	Boonkong Sanepoot; Thailand	not awarded
Discus throw	F34	Võ Văn Tùng; Vietnam	Alihan Muda; Brunei	not awarded
Javelin throw	F34	Võ Văn Tùng; Vietnam	not awarded	not awarded
Shot put	F34	Võ Văn Tùng; Vietnam	Alihan Muda; Brunei	not awarded
Discus throw	F37	Thanaphon Kongsao; Thailand	Ahmad Fauzi; Indonesia	Heronlee Wong; Malaysia
Javelin throw	F37	Thanaphon Kongsao; Thailand	Heronlee Wong; Malaysia	Ahmad Fauzi; Indonesia
Shot put	F37	Ahmad Fauzi; Indonesia	Thanaphon Kongsao; Thailand	Trần Nam Long; Vietnam
Discus throw	F40/41	Trần Văn Nguyên; Vietnam	Sholahuddin Al Ayyubi; Indonesia	Ansyari Sugian Noor; Indonesia
Javelin throw	F40/41	Trần Văn Nguyên; Vietnam	Ansyari Sugian Noor; Indonesia	Sholahuddin Al Ayyubi; Indonesia
Shot put	F40/41	Muhammad Diroy bin Noordin; Singapore	Ansyari Sugian Noor; Indonesia	Trần Văn Nguyên; Vietnam
Discus throw	F44	Yahya Juhdiansyah; Indonesia	Yohanis Bili; Indonesia	Reza Pramana Perangin-angin; Indonesia
Shot put	F44	Reza Pramana Perangin-angin; Indonesia	Yohanis Bili; Indonesia	Yahya Juhdiansyah; Indonesia
Discus throw	F46	Priyano Marto Sarwan; Indonesia	Aung Phone Myat; Myanmar	Hour Chlosa; Cambodia
Javelin throw	F46	Rizal Bagus Saktyono; Indonesia	Angkarn Chanaboon; Thailand	Priyano Marto Sarwan; Indonesia
Shot put	F46	Aung Phone Myat; Myanmar	Priyano Marto Sarwan; Indonesia	Hour Chlosa; Cambodia
Javelin throw	F54	Andrei Acacio Kuizon; Philippines	Poul Sarravann; Cambodia	not awarded
Shot put	F54	Andrei Acacio Kuizon; Philippines	Phea Phawat; Cambodia	not awarded
Discus throw	F55	Riadi Saputra; Indonesia	Kiều Minh Trung; Vietnam	Shari Haji Juma'at; Brunei
Javelin throw	F55	Kiều Minh Trung; Vietnam	Riadi Saputra; Indonesia	Shari Haji Juma'at; Brunei
Shot put	F55	Mohammad Zikri Zakaria; Malaysia	Muhammad Amirul Alif Abdul Raof; Malaysia	Riadi Saputra; Indonesia
Discus throw	F56	Trịnh Công Luận; Vietnam	Maekel Hermo Lita; Philippines	not awarded
Javelin throw	F56	Trịnh Công Luận; Vietnam	Si Thu Htet; Myanmar	Maekel Hermo Lita; Philippines
Shot put	F56	Mohamad Shahmil Mohammad Saad; Malaysia	Si Thu Htet; Myanmar	Trịnh Công Luận; Vietnam
Discus throw	F57	Fauzi Purwolaksono; Indonesia	Arya Bima Shena; Indonesia	Cao Ngọc Hùng; Vietnam
Javelin throw	F57	Cao Ngọc Hùng; Vietnam	Fauzi Purwolaksono; Indonesia	Sakchai Yimbanchang; Thailand
Shot put	F57	Witaya Charoenying; Thailand	Fauzi Purwolaksono; Indonesia	Sakchai Yimbanchang; Thailand
Discus throw	F63	Aung Tun Lin; Myanmar	Tin Nyo; Myanmar	Sutarno Kaswan; Indonesia
Javelin throw	F63	Tin Nyo; Myanmar	Dapiel Bayage; Indonesia	Sutarno Kaswan; Indonesia
Shot put	F63	Tin Nyo; Myanmar	Aung Tun Lin; Myanmar	Sutarno Kaswan; Indonesia
Discus throw	F64	Ye Min Soe; Myanmar	Phan Văn Dũng; Vietnam	Hein Htet Hlaing; Myanmar
Shot put	F64	Phan Văn Dũng; Vietnam	Zaw Min Lwin; Myanmar	Soe Than; Myanmar
4 × 100 m relay	T11–13	Indonesia (INA); Eko Saputra; Muammar Habibila; Petrus Kanel Alupan; Ruli Al Kahfi Mubaroq	Vietnam (VIE); Nguyễn Ngọc Hiệp; Nguyễn Văn Bình; Phạm Nguyễn Khánh Minh; Vũ Tiến Mạnh	not awarded
4 × 400 m relay	T11–13	Thailand (THA); Aekarin Meksaen; Kissanapong Tisuwan; Songwut Lamsan; Supachai Songpinij	Indonesia (INA); Eko Saputra; Muammar Habibila; Ruli Al Kahfi Mubaroq; Slamet Wahyu Jati	not awarded
4 × 100 m relay	T42–47	Indonesia (INA); Nur Ferry Pradana; Partin Muhlisin; Rizal Bagus Saktyono; Ryan Arda Diarta	Thailand (THA); Chaiwat Sirimongkhol; Denpoom Kotcharang; Jafa Seapla; Jakkrit Phimjun	Myanmar (MYA); Arr Te; Soe Pea; Thet Htoo Aung; Thuya Zaw
4 × 400 m relay	T42–47	Indonesia (INA); Nur Ferry Pradana; Partin Muhlisin; Ryan Arda Diarta; Wakhidun	Thailand (THA); Denpoom Kotcharang; Jafa Seapla; Phalathip Khamta; Supakon Ngamnoi	Myanmar (MYA); San Tin; Soe Pea; Thet Htoo Aung; Thuya Zaw

Women

Event	Class	Gold	Silver	Bronze
200 m	T11	Suneeporn Tanomwong; Thailand	Susan Unggu; Indonesia	Janjira Panyatib; Thailand
400 m	T11	Suneeporn Tanomwong; Thailand	Susan Unggu; Indonesia	Yin Sot; Cambodia
800 m	T11	Yin Sot; Cambodia	Nguyễn Kim Xuyến; Vietnam	Kroem Long; Cambodia
Long jump	T11	Janjira Panyatib; Thailand	Vũ Thị Kim Thúy; Vietnam	Yin Sot; Cambodia
100 m	T12	Ni Made Arianti Putri; Indonesia	Đinh Thảo Duyên; Vietnam	Souliphone Vongdala; Laos
200 m	T12	Ni Made Arianti Putri; Indonesia	Wassana Yimin; Thailand	Đinh Thảo Duyên; Vietnam
800 m	T12	Wassana Yimin; Thailand	Sun Sreymom; Cambodia	Hoeun Navy; Cambodia
Long jump	T12	Đinh Thảo Duyên; Vietnam	Kang Chamroeun; Cambodia	Sun Sreymom; Cambodia
400 m	T20	Orawan Kaising; Thailand	Tiwa; Indonesia	Elvin Elhudia Sesa; Indonesia
800 m	T20	Orawan Kaising; Thailand	Elvin Elhudia Sesa; Indonesia	Tiwa; Indonesia
1500 m	T20	Elvin Elhudia Sesa; Indonesia	Tiwa; Indonesia	Orawan Kaising; Thailand
Long jump	T20	Nani Shahiera Zawawi; Malaysia	Rica Oktavia; Indonesia	Nur Hidayah Mohammad Izaha; Malaysia
100 m	T38	Aorawan Chimpaen; Thailand	Insan Nurhaida; Indonesia	Suphatsara Luyue; Thailand
200 m	T38	Aorawan Chimpaen; Thailand	Insan Nurhaida; Indonesia	Suphatsara Luyue; Thailand
200 m	T42–44	Karisma Evi Tiarani; Indonesia	Wai Wai Thin; Myanmar	Helin Wardina; Indonesia
400 m	T42–44	Karisma Evi Tiarani; Indonesia	Wai Wai Thin; Myanmar	Helin Wardina; Indonesia
Long jump	T42–44	Karisma Evi Tiarani; Indonesia	Wai Wai Thin; Myanmar	Helin Wardina; Indonesia
400 m	T46/47	Sasirawan Inthachot; Thailand	Nanda Mei Sholihah; Indonesia	Pagjiraporn Gagun; Thailand
800 m	T46	Pagjiraporn Gagun; Thailand	Nguon Ratana; Cambodia	Srun Buntheng; Cambodia
1500 m	T46	Nguon Ratana; Cambodia	Pagjiraporn Gagun; Thailand	Srun Buntheng; Cambodia
100 m	T47	Sasirawan Inthachot; Thailand	Nanda Mei Sholihah; Indonesia	Nandar Lin; Myanmar
200 m	T47	Sasirawan Inthachot; Thailand	Nanda Mei Sholihah; Indonesia	Nandar Lin; Myanmar
200 m	T52	Maria Goreti Samiyati; Indonesia	Nina Gusmita; Indonesia	Atittaya Chookerd; Thailand
400 m	T52	Techinee Duangin; Thailand	Maria Goreti Samiyati; Indonesia	Hyatfa Chuiaui; Thailand
800 m	T52	Hyatfa Chuiaui; Thailand	Atittaya Chookerd; Thailand	Maria Goreti Samiyati; Indonesia
200 m	T64	Vet Chantha; Cambodia	not awarded	not awarded
400 m	T64	Vet Chantha; Cambodia	Law Lar Win; Myanmar	not awarded
Long jump	T64	Vet Chantha; Cambodia	Law Lar Win; Myanmar	not awarded
Discus throw	F11	Dayang Nor Hensan; Brunei	Nguyễn Thị Chín; Vietnam	Rosalie Quiño Torrefiel; Philippines
Javelin throw	F11	Rosalie Quiño Torrefiel; Philippines	Ratnaningsih; Indonesia	Nguyễn Thị Chín; Vietnam
Shot put	F11	Dayang Nor Hensan; Brunei	Ratnaningsih; Indonesia	Nguyễn Thị Chín; Vietnam
Shot put	F20	Suparni Yati; Indonesia	Noor Imanina Idris; Malaysia	Maria Ravinia Caniño Carpena; Philippines
Discus throw	F44	Warmia Marto Samidi; Indonesia	Trần Thị Thúy Hằng; Vietnam	Doriah Poulus; Malaysia
Javelin throw	F44	Doriah Poulus; Malaysia	Warmia Marto Samidi; Indonesia	Trần Thị Thúy Hằng; Vietnam
Shot put	F44	Doriah Poulus; Malaysia	Warmia Marto Samidi; Indonesia	Trần Thị Thúy Hằng; Vietnam
Discus throw	F46	Bingah Tritih Timur; Indonesia	Patcharee Wisetsee; Thailand	Maria Wilil; Indonesia
Javelin throw	F46	Patcharee Wisetsee; Thailand	Maria Wilil; Indonesia	Muny Keomany; Laos
Shot put	F46	Patcharee Wisetsee; Thailand	Bingah Tritih Timur; Indonesia	Maria Wilil; Indonesia
Discus throw	F54	Nguyễn Thị Ngọc Thúy; Vietnam	Trần Thị Tú; Vietnam	Cendy Asusano; Philippines
Javelin throw	F54	Cendy Asusano; Philippines	Marites Burce; Philippines	Trần Thị Tú; Vietnam
Shot put	F54	Cendy Asusano; Philippines	Nguyễn Thị Ngọc Thúy; Vietnam	Marites Burce; Philippines
Discus throw	F55	Htet Htet Aye; Myanmar	Jesebel Arevalo Tordecilla; Philippines	Dwi Oktaviani; Indonesia
Javelin throw	F55	Jesebel Arevalo Tordecilla; Philippines	Htet Htet Aye; Myanmar	Ngô Thị Lan Thanh; Vietnam
Shot put	F55	Htet Htet Aye; Myanmar	Ngô Thị Lan Thanh; Vietnam	Jesebel Arevalo Tordecilla; Philippines
Discus throw	F56	Famini; Indonesia	Trương Bích Vân; Vietnam	not awarded
Javelin throw	F56	Trương Bích Vân; Vietnam	Famini; Indonesia	not awarded
Shot put	F56	Trương Bích Vân; Vietnam	Puangpet Chaithongrat; Thailand	not awarded
Discus throw	F57	Nguyễn Thị Hải; Vietnam	Seriwati; Indonesia	Nguyễn Thị Kiều; Vietnam
Javelin throw	F57	Nguyễn Thị Hải; Vietnam	Seriwati; Indonesia	Titinan Anongchai; Thailand
Shot put	F57	Nguyễn Thị Hải; Vietnam	Seriwati; Indonesia	Reni Ariyanti; Indonesia
Javelin throw	F64	Sein Phawt; Myanmar	Võ Thị Thu Thuận; Vietnam	Chhoeurng Sreymach; Cambodia
Shot put	F63-64	Sein Phawt; Myanmar	Putri Maulina; Indonesia	Chhoeurng Sreymach; Cambodia
