= Zhu Daqing =

Chinese Paralympic athlete (born 1990)

Personal information
- Nationality: Chinese
- Born: 25 February 1990 (age 36) Baoding, China
- Height: 160 cm (5 ft 3 in)

Sport
- Country: China
- Sport: Athletics
- Disability class: T12
- Event: sprint
- Club: Hebei Province
- Coached by: Li Xiuqing (club); Zeng Huawei (national)
Medal record
Paralympic alpine skiing
Representing China
Winter Paralympic Games
Silver medal – second place	2022 Beijing	Women's downhill
Silver medal – second place	2022 Beijing	Women's giant slalom
Silver medal – second place	2022 Beijing	Women's super combined
Bronze medal – third place	2022 Beijing	Women's super-G
Paralympic athletics
Paralympic Games
Bronze medal – third place	2012 London	200 m – T12
IPC World Championships
Silver medal – second place	2011 Christchurch	100 m relay – T11–13
Asian Para Games
Gold medal – first place	2010 Guangzhou	100 m – T12
Gold medal – first place	2010 Guangzhou	400 m – T12
Asia-Oceania Championships
Gold medal – first place	2016 Dubai	100 m – T12
Gold medal – first place	2016 Dubai	200 m – T12
Gold medal – first place	2016 Dubai	400 m – T12

Zhu Daqing (born 25 February 1990) is a visually impaired Paralympian athlete from China competing in athletics (track and field) and alpine skiing. Zhu won a bronze medal at her first Summer Paralympics, the 2012 London Games, in the women's 200m sprint; and 3 silver, 1 bronze medal in alpine skiing. She is also a World Championships and Asia-Oceania Games medalists, winning six medals over three tournaments.
