= Juma'at =

Juma'at is both a masculine given name and surname. Notable people with the name include:

== Given name ==
- Juma'at Jantan (born 1984), Singaporean footballer

== Surname ==
- Hyrulnizam Juma'at (born 1986), Singaporean footballer
- Shari Haji Juma'at, Bruneian Paralympic athlete
