= Athletics at the 2015 ASEAN Para Games =

- Venue: National Stadium, Singapore
- Date: 4-9 December 2015

Paralympic athletics at the 2015 ASEAN Para Games was held at National Stadium, Singapore.

== Medal table ==
* Host nation (Singapore)

Rank	Nation	Gold	Silver	Bronze	Total
1	Thailand (THA)	30	32	22	84
2	Indonesia (INA)	27	24	16	67
3	Malaysia (MAS)	27	18	8	53
4	Vietnam (VIE)	17	18	17	52
5	Philippines (PHI)	5	3	9	17
6	Myanmar (MYA)	3	6	14	23
7	Brunei (BRU)	2	3	4	9
8	Cambodia (CAM)	1	2	5	8
9	Singapore (SIN)*	0	2	0	2
10	Laos (LAO)	0	0	1	1
Totals (10 entries)		112	108	96	316

== Medalists ==
=== Men ===
Event	Gold	Silver	Bronze
100 m T11	Abdul Halim Dalimunte; Indonesia	Jorchuy Kitsana; Thailand	Sunoto; Indonesia
200 m T11	Songphinit Suphachai; Thailand	Sunoto; Indonesia	Jorchuy Kitsana; Thailand
400 m T11	Songphinit Suphachai; Thailand	Sunoto; Indonesia	Nguyen Ngoc Hiep; Vietnam
100 m T12	Muhammad Faizal Aideal bin Suhaimi; Malaysia	Muhamad Saifuddin bin Ishak; Malaysia	Mohammad Afiq bin Mohamad Ali Hanafiah; Malaysia
200 m T12	Mohammad Afiq bin Mohamad Ali Hanafiah; Malaysia	Muhammad Faizal Aideal bin Suhaimi; Malaysia	Chaiya Somdech; Thailand
400 m T12	Nguyen Hoang Minh; Vietnam	Harjono Tarihoran; Indonesia	Nguyen Van Binh; Vietnam
800 m T11/12	Nguyen Hoang Minh; Vietnam	Nguyen Van Binh; Vietnam	Songphinit Suphachai; Thailand
1500 m T12	Nguyen Hoang Minh; Vietnam	-	-
100 m T13	Premruedichaisak Chakkrawan; Thailand	-	-
400 m T20	Felipus Kolymau; Indonesia	Nasharuddin bin Mohd; Malaysia	Endi Nurdin Tine; Indonesia
1500 m T20	Muhammad Nurdin bin Ibrahim; Malaysia	Nasrodin; Indonesia	Endi Nurdin Tine; Indonesia
100 m T36	Mohamad Ridzuan Mohamad Puzi; Malaysia	Muhamad Agung Laksana; Indonesia	-
200 m T36	Mohamad Ridzuan Mohamad Puzi; Malaysia	Muhamad Agung Laksana; Indonesia	-
100 m T37	Le Van Manh; Vietnam	Saewang Sakphet; Thailand	Taon Chairat; Thailand
200 m T37	Saewang Sakphet; Thailand	Jacklon bin Ganding; Malaysia	Taon Chairat; Thailand
400 m T37	Le Van Manh; Vietnam	Saewang Sakphet; Thailand	Timin; Indonesia
1500 m T37	Timin; Indonesia	Leow Zi Xiang Zac; Singapore	-
100 m T38	Krishna Kumar Hari Das; Malaysia	Suyono; Indonesia	Amir Firdauss bin Jamaluddin; Malaysia
200 m T38	Krishna Kumar Hari Das; Malaysia	Amir Firdauss bin Jamaluddin; Malaysia	Wongnonthaphum Damkoeng; Thailand
400 m T36/38	Krishna Kumar Hari Das; Malaysia	Damchoom Surasak; Thailand	Suyono; Indonesia
100 m T42	Mulyono; Indonesia	Morapat Tawatchai; Thailand	Tint Naing Win; Myanmar
200 m T42	Morapat Tawatchai; Thailand	Mulyono; Indonesia	Tint Naing Win; Myanmar
100 m T44	Rasyidi; Indonesia	Wagiyo; Indonesia	Uamsamut Suthis; Thailand
200 m T44	Kyaw Kyaw Win; Myanmar	Rasyidi; Indonesia	Wagiyo; Indonesia
400 m T44	Kyaw Kyaw Win; Myanmar	Wagiyo; Indonesia	San Mao; Cambodia
100 m T45/46	Phung Dinh Tu; Vietnam	Ahmad Solihim bin Mohd Nor; Malaysia	Bong Hong; Cambodia
200 m T45/46	Phung Dinh Tu; Vietnam	Ahmad Solihim bin Mohd Nor; Malaysia	Mai Anh Minh; Vietnam
400 m T45/46	Bong Hong; Cambodia	Phung Dinh Tu; Vietnam	Raul Quilang Angoluan; Philippines
800 m T46	Muhamad Ashraf bin Muhammad Haisham; Malaysia	Tran Van Duc; Vietnam	Erens Sabandar; Indonesia
1500 m T46	Tran Van Duc; Vietnam	Muhamad Ashraf bin Muhammad Haisham; Malaysia	Isidro Patena Vildosola; Philippines
100 m T47	Setyo Budi Hartanto; Indonesia	Martin Losu; Indonesia	Arman Pila Dino; Philippines
200 m T47	Martin Losu; Indonesia	Arman Pila Dino; Philippines	Achmad Zein; Indonesia
400 m T47	Martin Losu; Indonesia	Yamee Sutat; Thailand	Arman Pila Dino; Philippines
100 m T52	Jerrold Pete Macabio Mangliwan; Philippines	Pichaya Kurattanasiri; Thailand	Rungsri Peth; Thailand
200 m T52	Jerrold Pete Macabio Mangliwan; Philippines	Rungsri Peth; Thailand	-
400 m T52	Pichaya Kurattanasiri; Thailand	Jerrold Pete Macabio Mangliwan; Philippines	Rungsri Peth; Thailand
100 m T53	Pongsakorn Paeyo; Thailand	Pichet Krungget; Thailand	Sopa Intasen; Thailand
200 m T53	Pichet Krungget; Thailand	Chhun Phun; Cambodia	Luc Thuong Hoa; Vietnam
400 m T53	Pongsakorn Paeyo; Thailand	Sopa Intasen; Thailand	Chhun Phun; Cambodia
800 m T52/53	Pongsakorn Paeyo; Thailand	Pichet Krungget; Thailand	Sopa Intasen; Thailand
100 m T54	Saichon Konjen; Thailand	Jaenal Aripin; Indonesia	Van Vun; Cambodia
200 m T54	Saichon Konjen; Thailand	Jaenal Aripin; Indonesia	Janthon Ekkachai; Thailand
400 m T54	Saichon Konjen; Thailand	Janthon Ekkachai; Thailand	Jaenal Aripin; Indonesia
1500 m T53/54	Prawat Wahoram; Thailand	Rawat Tana; Thailand	Heng Savoeun; Cambodia
4 × 100 m relay T11/12/13	Thailand (THA); Chaiya Somdech; Jorchuy Kitsana; Premruedichaisak Chakkrawan; Songphinit Suphachai	Indonesia (INA); Abdul Halim Dalimunte; Ganjar Jatnika; Harjono Tarihoran; I Nyoman Oka	-
4 × 100 m relay T42/43/44/45/46/47	Indonesia (INA); Martin Losu; Rasyidi; Setyo Budi Hartanto; Wagiyo	Thailand (THA); Morapat Tawatchai; Sirimongkhol Chaiwat; Uamsamut Suthis; Yamee Sutat	Vietnam (VIE); Mai Anh Minh; Phan Van Dung; Phung Dinh Tu; Tran Van Duc
Long jump F11/12	Muhamad Saifuddin bin Ishak; Malaysia	Mohammad Afiq bin Mohamad Ali Hanafiah; Malaysia	Nguyen Ngoc Hiep; Vietnam
Long jump F20	Abdul Latif bin Romly; Malaysia	Suhairi bin Suhani; Singapore	Fadli Amirullah; Indonesia
Long jump F37/38	Amir Firdauss bin Jamaluddin; Malaysia	Phan Dinh Duong; Vietnam	Nguyen Huu Thinh; Vietnam
High jump F42/44	Ngo Xuan Doan; Vietnam	Soe Than; Myanmar	Andy Ramirez Avellana; Philippines
Long jump F42	Morapat Tawatchai; Thailand	Mulyono; Indonesia	Andy Ramirez Avellana; Philippines
Long jump F44	Rasyidi; Indonesia	Saiful bin Dawang; Malaysia	Kyaw Kyaw Win; Myanmar
High jump F45/46/47	Chanaboon Angkarn; Thailand	-	-
Long jump F45/46/47	Setyo Budi Hartanto; Indonesia	Sirimongkhol Chaiwat; Thailand	Eryanto bin Bahtiar; Malaysia
Triple jump F45/46/47	Setyo Budi Hartanto; Indonesia	Eryanto bin Bahtiar; Malaysia	Aung Htoo; Myanmar
Shot put F11/12	Boonsri Phichai; Thailand	Muhammad Firdaus bin Ngatiman; Malaysia	Wongngoen Arnon; Thailand
Discus throw F11/12	Boonsri Phichai; Thailand	Wongngoen Arnon; Thailand	Evaristo Joven Carbonel; Philippines
Javelin throw F12/13	Muhammad Hisham bin Khaironi; Malaysia	I Nyoman Oka; Indonesia	Boonsri Phichai; Thailand
Shot put F20	Muhammad Ziyad Zolkefli; Malaysia	Muhammad Aliff bin Mohamad Awi; Malaysia	Mohammad Khairin Azhar bin Rosli; Brunei
Shot put F33/34	Vo Van Tung; Vietnam	Davis Machang; Malaysia	Alihan Muda; Brunei
Discus throw F32/33/34	Alihan Muda; Brunei	Vo Van Tung; Vietnam	Adderin bin Majurin; Malaysia
Shot put F35/36/37	Muhammad Hafiz bin Abu Bakar; Malaysia	Thomson Lim Kok Hong; Malaysia	Zakaria bin Saad; Malaysia
Discus throw F35/36/37	Muhammad Hafiz bin Abu Bakar; Malaysia	Zakaria bin Saad; Malaysia	Thomson Lim Kok Hong; Malaysia
Javelin throw F36/37/38	Shamli bin Waidi; Malaysia	Nguyen Van Thinh; Vietnam	Thomson Lim Kok Hong; Malaysia
Shot put F42/43	Sutarno; Indonesia	Myo Min Oo; Myanmar	Vuong Chau; Vietnam
Discus throw F42/43	Vuong Chau; Vietnam	Sutarno; Indonesia	-
Javelin throw F42/43	Sutarno; Indonesia	Tint Naing Win; Myanmar	Myo Min Oo; Myanmar
Shot put F44	Myo Swe; Myanmar	San Mhwe; Myanmar	Phan Van Dung; Vietnam
Discus throw F44	Yahya; Indonesia	Phan Van Dung; Vietnam	Myo Swe; Myanmar
Javelin throw F44	Yohanis Bili; Indonesia	Phan Van Dung; Vietnam	San Mhwe; Myanmar
Shot put F46	Hisam bin Che Soh; Malaysia	Priyano; Indonesia	Aung Phone Myat; Myanmar
Javelin throw F46	Chanaboon Angkarn; Thailand	-	-
Shot put F53/54/55	Joel Adegue Balatucan; Philippines	Riadi Saputra; Indonesia	Sahri bin Hj Jumaat; Brunei
Discus throw F54/55	Riadi Saputra; Indonesia	Joel Adegue Balatucan; Philippines	Sahri bin Hj Jumaat; Brunei
Javelin throw F54/55	Sahri bin Hj Jumaat; Brunei	Riyadi Nugraha Saputra Utama; Indonesia	Joel Adegue Balatucan; Philippines
Shot put F56/57	Nguyen Be Hau; Vietnam	Yimbanchang Sakchai; Thailand	Alan Sastra; Indonesia
Discus throw F56/57	Alan Sastra; Indonesia	Cao Ngọc Hùng; Vietnam	Nguyen Be Hau; Vietnam
Javelin throw F56/57	Cao Ngọc Hùng; Vietnam	Yimbanchang Sakchai; Thailand	Alan Sastra; Indonesia

=== Women ===
Event	Gold	Silver	Bronze
100 m T11	Wannaruemon Kewalin; Thailand	Thongsing Ratchaniphon; Thailand	Riangraiwilatkheeree Sirirat; Thailand
200 m T11	Wannaruemon Kewalin; Thailand	Riangraiwilatkheeree Sirirat; Thailand	Nguyen Thi Nhan; Vietnam
400 m T11	Wannaruemon Kewalin; Thailand	Nguyen Thi Nhan; Vietnam	Marta Tambunan; Indonesia
100 m T12	Enang Sari Sitorus; Indonesia	Tanomwong Suneeporn; Thailand	Prawat Supunnee; Thailand
200 m T12	Enang Sari Sitorus; Indonesia	Tanomwong Suneeporn; Thailand	Prawat Supunnee; Thailand
400 m T12	Enang Sari Sitorus; Indonesia	Prawat Supunnee; Thailand	-
100 m T13	Felicia binti Mikat; Malaysia	An Nur Haiyyu bte Md Yussof; Brunei	Dong Thi Hai Yen; Vietnam
200 m T13	Felicia binti Mikat; Malaysia	An Nur Haiyyu bte Md Yussof; Brunei	Dong Thi Hai Yen; Vietnam
400 m T13	Felicia binti Mikat; Malaysia	Dong Thi Hai Yen; Vietnam	Vongdala Souliphone; Laos
400 m T20	Siti Noor Iasah Mohamad Ariffin; Malaysia	Siti Noor Radiah Ismail; Malaysia	Rica Oktavia; Indonesia
100 m T36/38	Phumchan Phonsuda; Thailand	Insan Nurhaida; Indonesia	Luyue Suphatsara; Thailand
200 m T35/36	Insan Nurhaida; Indonesia	Phumchan Phonsuda; Thailand	-
100 m T43/44	Nguyen Thi Thuy; Vietnam	Lai Thi Ngoc Anh; Vietnam	Inginn Khin; Myanmar
200 m T43/44	Nguyen Thi Thuy; Vietnam	Thin Seng Hon; Cambodia	Lai Thi Ngoc Anh; Vietnam
100 m T45/46/47	Nanda Mei Sholihah; Indonesia	Gagun Pagjiraporn; Thailand	Nandar Lin; Myanmar
200 m T45/46/47	Nanda Mei Sholihah; Indonesia	Gagun Pagjiraporn; Thailand	Nandar Lin; Myanmar
400 m T45/46/47	Nanda Mei Sholihah; Indonesia	Gagun Pagjiraporn; Thailand	Nandar Lin; Myanmar
100 m T54	Prudencia Del Mundo Panaligan; Philippines	Nguyen Thi Xuan Anh; Vietnam	Sritong Chainet; Thailand
200 m T53/54	Prudencia Del Mundo Panaligan; Philippines	Nguyen Thi Xuan Anh; Vietnam	Sritong Chainet; Thailand
400 m T53/54	Chatyotsakorn Tpat; Thailand	Sekratok Pranaya; Thailand	Prudencia Del Mundo Panaligan; Philippines
800 m T53/54	Sekratok Pranaya; Thailand	Sritong Chainet; Thailand	Chatyotsakorn Tpat; Thailand
Long jump F11/12	Vu Thi Kim Thuy; Vietnam	Nguyen Thi Nhan; Vietnam	Tanomwong Suneeporn; Thailand
Long jump F20	Rica Oktavia; Indonesia	Siti Noor Radiah Ismail; Malaysia	Siti Noor Iasah Mohamad Ariffin; Malaysia
Long jump F44	Lai Thi Ngoc Anh; Vietnam	Inginn Khin; Myanmar	Nguyen Thi Thuy; Vietnam
Shot put F11/12	Hemala Devi Eni Kutty; Malaysia	Dyg Nor Hensan binti Awg Haji Mataha; Brunei	Nguyen Thi Chin; Vietnam
Shot put F20	Nursuhana binti Ramlan; Malaysia	Nila Kung; Thailand	-
Shot put F35/36/37	Umi Syuhadah binti Idris; Malaysia	Ha Thi Hue; Vietnam	-
Shot put F42/43/44	Doriah Poulus; Malaysia	Ladee Wanna; Thailand	Sein Phawt; Myanmar
Discus throw F42/44	Doriah Poulus; Malaysia	Warmia Marto Samidi; Indonesia	Tran Thi Thuy Hang; Vietnam
Shot put F46	Wisetsee Patcharee; Thailand	Khamsuk Surang; Thailand	-
Javelin throw F45/46	Khamsuk Surang; Thailand	Putu Christiani; Indonesia	-
Shot put F54/55	Chaithongrat Puangpet; Thailand	Ngo Thi Lan Thanh; Vietnam	Htet Htet Aye; Myanmar
Discus throw F54/55	Chaithongrat Puangpet; Thailand	Htet Htet Aye; Myanmar	Eka Rosa Hybrida; Indonesia
Discus throw F56/57	Yuddiana; Indonesia	Nguyen Thi Hai; Vietnam	Famini; Indonesia
