= IPC Athletic Asia-Oceania Championship 2016 – Men's 100 metres =

The Men's 100 meter Race at the IPC Athletics Asia-Oceania Championship 2016 was held at the Dubai Police Club Stadium in Dubai from 7–12 March.

== Results ==
Legend

AS: Asian Record

WR: World Record

PB: Personal Best

SB: Season Best

Fn-False Start

Q- Qualified for Finals

q- Qualified for Finals as per best performance

DNF- Did Not Finish

DSQ- Disqualified

=== T11 ===
==== Heat 1/2 ====
Date- 09:March:2016

Time- 17:02

Wind -0.9
Rank	Name	Reaction Time	Finish Time	
1.	LWANI Saud(T11) Guide Patchai Srikhampan; Thailand (THA)	0.172 0.211	12.41	Q
2.	Yang Chuan-Hui (T11) Guide Huang Te-Tseng; Chinese Taipei (TPE)	0.302 0.248	12.41	Q
3.	Peerapon Watbok (T11) Guide Sunt Aunkai; Thailand (THA)	0.468 0.289	12.49	

==== Heat 2/2 ====
Date- 09:March:2016

Time- 17:10

Wind -1.0
Rank	Name	Reaction Time	Finish Time	
1.	Arash Koshravi (T11) Guide Javed Marghashi; Iran (IRI)	0.291 0.301	12.01	Q
2.	Abdul Halim Dalimunte (T11) Guide Emanuel Permana Anjar; Indonesia (INA)	0.291 0.255	12.45	Q
3.	Jakkit Punthong (T11) Guide Punna Makhumjai; Thailand (THA)	0.328 0.336	12.65	

==== Final ====
Date- 10:March:2016

Time- 17:28

Wind -0.1
Rank	Name	Reaction Time	Finish Time
1.	Arash Koshravi (T11) Guide Javed Marghashi; Iran (IRI)	0.191 0.236	11.96
2.	Abdul Halim Dalimunte (T11) Guide Emanuel Permana Anjar; Indonesia (INA)	0.167 0.219	12.05
3.	LWANI Saud(T11) Guide Patchai Srikhampan; Thailand (THA)	0.177 0.227	12.16
4.	Yang Chuan-Hui (T11) Guide Huang Te-Tseng; Chinese Taipei (TPE)	0.269 0.289	12.33

=== T12 ===
==== Final ====
Wind 0.0
Rank	Name	Reaction Time	Finish Time
1.	Konishi Maasaki (T12) Japan (JPN)	0.131	11.70
2.	Somdech Chaiya (T12) Thailand (THA)	0.207	12.32
3.	Shahzad Akram (T12) Pakistan (PAK)	0.370	13.29

=== T13 ===
==== Final ====
Wind 0.0
Rank	Name	Reaction Time	Finish Time
1.	Liu Wei (T13) China (CHN)	0.256	11.22
2.	Chakkrawan Premruedichaisak (T13) Thailand (THA)	0.201	11.92
3.	Mahdi Moradikoochi (T13) Iran (IRI)	0.225	11.98
4.	Songwut Lamsan (T13) Thailand (THA)	0.225	11.99
5.	Salimov Islam (T13) Kazakhstan (KAZ)	0.227	12.33

=== T34 ===
==== Final ====
Date- 11:March:2016

Time- 17:00

Wind +0.4
Rank	Name	Reaction Time	Finish Time
1.	Mohamed Hammadi (T34) United Arab Emirates (UAE)	-	16.30
2.	Ahmad Almutairi (T34) Kuwait (KUW)	-	16.47
3.	Mohammed Rashid RJ Al-Kubaisi (T34) Qatar (QAT)	-	17.11
4.	Khalid Ahmad Al-Hajri (T34) Qatar (QAT)	-	19.73
5.	Nasir Saleh (T34) Kuwait (KUW)	-	21.47

=== T35 ===
==== Final ====
Date- 07:March:2016

Time- 16:30

Wind 0.0
Rank	Name	Reaction Time	Finish Time
1.	XIN Ming(T35) China (CHN)	-	15.71
2.	AL-DOSARI Khalifa Abdulla (T35); Qatar (QAT)	-	16.27

=== T36 ===
==== Final ====
Date- 09:March:2016 Time- 16:48

Wind -1.3
Rank	Name	Reaction Time	Finish Time
1.	Mohamad Riduzan Mohamd Puzi (T36); Malaysia (MAS)	-	12.45
2.	Yang Yifei (T36); China (CHN)	-	13.44
3.	Chan Wing Sum (T36); Hong Kong (HKG)	-	14.29
4.	Yuen Ka Kin (T36); Hong Kong (HKG)	-	14.47

=== T37 ===
==== Heat 1/2 ====
Date- 07:March:2016 Time- 16:47

Wind +0.1
Rank	Name	Reaction Time	Finish Time	Results
1.	KALKAYEV Amanat (T37); Kazakhstan (KAZ)	-	12.88	Q
2.	DETOHATA Nozomu (T37); Japan (JPN)	-	13.42	Q
3.	ALI Haider (T37); Pakistan (PAK)	-	14.19	Q
4.	ALABSI Akram (T37); Saudi Arabia (KSA)	-	Fn	DSQ (IPC Rule 17.7)

==== Heat- 2/2 ====
Date- 07:March:2016 Time- 16:54

Wind -0.7
Rank	Name	Reaction Time	Finish Time	
1.	LWANI Saud(T37) Saudi Arabia (KSA)	-	13.19	Q
2.	SAEWANG Sakphet (T37); Thailand (THA)	-	13:29	Q
3.	AWAIS Muhammad(T37) Pakistan (PAK)	-	13:57	Q
4.	ALIKHANI FARADONBEH Ahmadreza (T37); Iran (IRI)	-	13:97	q
5.	ZHOLAMAN Yelaman (T37); Kazakhstan (KAZ)	-	14.43	q

==== Final ====
Date- 09:March:2016 Time- 16:54

Wind -0.1
Rank	Name	Reaction Time	Finish Time
1.	KALKAYEV Amanat (T37); Kazakhstan (KAZ)	-	13.15
2.	LWANI Saud (T37); Saudi Arabia (KSA)	-	13.32
3.	DETOHATA Nozomu (T37); Japan (JPN)	-	13.34
4.	ALIKHANI FARADONBEH Ahmadreza (T37); Iran (IRI)	-	13.96
5.	AWAIS Muhammad(T37) Pakistan (PAK)	-	14.09
6.	ALI Haider (T37); Pakistan (PAK)	-	DNF
7.	SAEWANG Sakphet (T37); Thailand (THA)	-	F2 DSQ (IPC Rule 17.7)

=== T38 ===
==== Final ====
Date- 07:March:2016

Time- 16:30

Wind -0.8
Rank	Name	Reaction Time	Finish Time
1.	AL-DARRAJI Abbas(T38) Iraq (IRQ)	-	12.24

=== T42 ===
==== Final ====
Date- 11:March:2016

Time- 17:08

Wind -0.6
Rank	Name	Reaction Time	Finish Time
1.	Anil Prasanna Jayalath Yodha Pedige (T38); Sri Lanka (SRI)	-	12.62
2.	Yamamoto Atsushi (T38); Japan (JPN)	-	12.78
3.	Buddika Indrapala (T38); Sri Lanka (SRI)	-	13.41
4.	Tawatchai Morapat (T38); Thailand (THA)	-	14.84
5.	Mohammad Naiem Durani (T38); Afghanistan (AFG)		17.77
6.	Abdullah Alfifi (T38); Saudi Arabia (KSA)	-	F1 DSQ (IPC Rule 17.7)
7.	Gyanendra Singh (T38); India (IND)	-	DNS

=== T44 ===
==== Final ====
Date- 11:March:2016

Time- 17:14

Wind -0.5
Rank	Name	Reaction Time	Finish Time
1.	Ajith Hettiarchchi (T44); Sri Lanka (SRI)	-	12.30
2.	Manoj Baskar (T44); India (IND)	-	12.47
3.	Suthith Umsamut (T44); Thailand (THA)	-	12.52
4.	Rasyidi (T44); Indonesia (INA)	-	12.64

=== T47 ===
==== Heat1/2 ====
Date- 09:March:2016

Time- 18:36

Wind -0.3
Rank	Name	Reaction Time	Finish Time	
1.	He Haican (T47); China (CHN)	-	11.35	Q
2.	Marthin Losu (T47); Indonesia (INA)	-	11.77	Q
3.	Yahya Alblooshi (T47); United Arab Emirates (UAE)	-	11.80	Q
4.	Chaiwat Sirimongkhol (T47); Thailand (THA)	-	11.96	q
5.	Samuel Nason (T47); Papua New Guinea (PNG)	-	12.86	
6.	Epeli Baleibau (T47); Fiji (FIJ)	-	13.35	

==== Heat 2/2 ====
Date- 09:March:2016

Time- 18:42

Wind -0.2
Rank	Name	Reaction Time	Finish Time	
1.	Ahmad Ojaghlou (T47); Iran (IRI)	-	11.35	Q
2.	Setiyo Budihartanto (T47); Indonesia (INA)	-	11.52	Q
3.	Sutat Yamee (T47); Thailand (THA)	-	11.94	Q
4.	Chen Tao (T47); China (CHN)	-	11.99	q
5.	Zang Xueke (T47); China (CHN)	-	12.28	
6.	Kolganat Bakbergen (T47); Kazakhstan (KAZ)	-	13.49	

==== Final ====
Date- 10:March:2016

Time- 17:16

Wind -1.0
Rank	Name	Reaction Time	Finish Time
1.	Ahmad Ojaghlou (T47); Iran (IRI)	-	11.09
2.	He Haican (T47); China (CHN)		11.36
3.	Setiyo Budihartanto (T47); Indonesia (INA)	-	11.58
4.	Chaiwat Sirimongkhol (T47); Thailand (THA)		11.68
5.	Yahya Alblooshi (T47); United Arab Emirates (UAE)		11.80
6.	Marthin Losu (T47); Indonesia (INA)		11.81
7.	Chen Tao (T47); China (CHN)		12.09
8.	Sutat Yamee (T47); Thailand (THA)	-	12.11

=== T53 ===
==== Final ====
Date- 08:March:2016 Time- 16:35

Wind +0.3
Rank	Name	Reaction Time	Finish Time
1.	ALGANAIDL Fahad(T53) Saudi Arabia (KSA)	-	15.32
2.	ALADWANI Hamad(T53) Kuwait (KUW)	-	16.06
3.	PUREVTSOG Enkhmanlai(T53) Mongolia (MGL)	-	17.03
4.	AREIDAT Naseib(T53) United Arab Emirates (UAE)	-	19.54

=== T54 ===
==== Final ====
Date- 08:March:2016 Time- 16:35

Wind +0.3
Rank	Name	Reaction Time	Finish Time
1.	ALSHEHHI Salem(T54) United Arab Emirates (UAE)	-	14.87
2.	ALDHAHERI Rashed(T54) United Arab Emirates (UAE)	-	15.15
3.	NISHI Yuki(T54) Mongolia (MGL)	-	15.32
4.	ALZAHRANI Jamaan(T54) Saudi Arabia (KSA)	-	15.44
