= IPC Athletic Asia-Oceania Championship 2016 – Men's shot put =

2016 championship in Dubai, UAE

The Men's Shot put at the IPC Athletics Asia-Oceania Championship 2016 was held at the Dubai Police Club Stadium in Dubai from 7–12 March.

== Results ==
Legend

AS: Asian Record

WR: World Record

PB: Personal Best

SB: Season Best

=== F35/36 Final ===
Date- 07:March:2016 Time- 16:15

| Rank | Name | Attempt 1 | Attempt 2 | Attempt 3 | Attempt 4 | Attempt 5 | Attempt 6 |
|---|---|---|---|---|---|---|---|
| 1. | JAVANMARDI Seyed Aliasghar (F35) Iran (IRI) | 12.39 (776) | 12.81 (824) | 12.91 (834) | 13.21 (865) | 12.48 (786) | X |
| 2. | AL-AZZAWI Jabbar (F35) Kuwait (KUW) | 11.26 (626) | 11.59 (673) | 11.20 (618) | 11.26 (626) | 11.55 (667) | 11.30 (632) |
| 3. | MUBARAK Saeed (F36) United Arab Emirates (UAE) | 9.95 (492) | 9.83 (473) | 10.16 (526) | X | 10.68 (607) | 9.79 (466) |
| 4. | AL KAABI Mohammed (F36) United Arab Emirates (UAE) | 10.34 (554) | X | 10.03 (505) | 10.27 (543) | X | X |

=== F55/56 Final ===
Date- 07:March:2016

Time- 16:15

| Rank | Name | Attempt 1 | Attempt 2 | Attempt 3 | Attempt 4 | Attempt 5 | Attempt 6 |
|---|---|---|---|---|---|---|---|
| 1. | NGUYEN Be Hau (F56) Vietnam (VIE) | 9.57 (685) | 10.18 (780) AS | 10.12 (771) | 9.49 (672) | 9.88 (735) | X |
| 2. | Sambuudanzan Ganzorig (F56) Mongolia (MGL) | 9.13 (610) | 8.89 (567) | 8.73 (537) | X | 8.61 (515) | 9.13 (610) |
| 3. | Parviz Golpasandhagh (F56) Iran (IRI) | X | 8.59 (530) | 8.77 (544) | 8.94 (576) | 8.06 (510) | 8.71 (533) |
| 4. | Sunil Phogat (F55) India (IND) | 7.50 (328) | 7.35 (300) | 7.33 (296) | 7.20 (273) | 7.24 (280) | 7.45 (318) |
| 5. | ZEYOUDI RASHED AHMED (F56) United Arab Emirates (UAE) | 6.63 (164) | X | 6.98 (217) | X | 6.97 (216) | 7.13 (242) |
| 6. | Eisa Alzbeidi (F55) United Arab Emirates (UAE) | 6.35 (140) | 6.52 (163) | 6.33 (137) | 6.23 (125) | X | 6.11 (110) |
| 7. | Saeed Dhanhani(F55) United Arab Emirates (UAE) | 5.61 (61) | 5.50 (53) | 5.37 (44) | X | 5.61 (61) | 5.35 (43) |
