= Jia Juntingxian =

Chinese Paralympic athlete (born 1986)

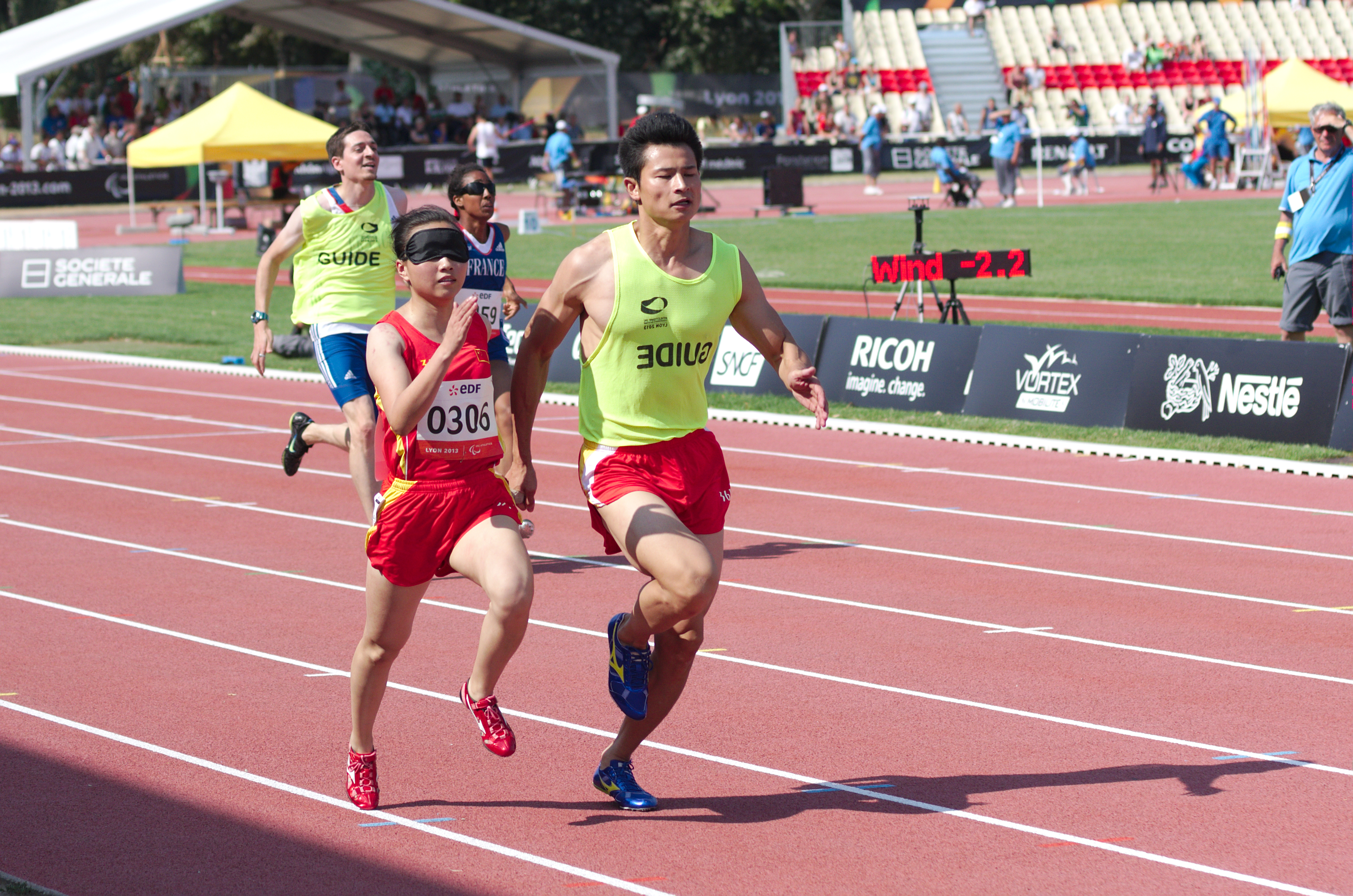
- Juntingxian with her guide Xu Donglin at the 2013 World Championships

Personal information
- Nationality: Chinese
- Born: 17 August 1986 (age 39) Jiangxi, China
- Height: 162 cm (5 ft 4 in)

Sport
- Country: China
- Sport: Athletics
- Disability class: T11, F11
- Event(s): sprint long jump
- Club: Jiangxi Province
- Coached by: Hu Zhengguan (national)
Medal record
Paralympic athletics
Representing China
Paralympic Games
Gold medal – first place	2016 Rio	4 × 100 m – T11–13
Silver medal – second place	2012 London	Long jump – F11–12
Bronze medal – third place	2012 London	200 m – T11
IPC World Championships
Gold medal – first place	2011 Christchurch	long jump – F11
Silver medal – second place	2011 Christchurch	100 m relay – T11–13
Bronze medal – third place	2013 Lyon	long jump – F11
Gold medal – first place	2015 Doha	100 m relay – T11–13
Asian Para Games
Silver medal – second place	2010 Guangzhou	100 m – T11
Asia-Oceania Championships
Gold medal – first place	2016 Dubai	100 m – T11
Gold medal – first place	2016 Dubai	200 m – T11

Jia Juntingxian (born 17 August 1986) is a visually impaired Paralympian athlete from China competing mainly in T11 classification sprint and long jump events. Zhou won two medals at her first Summer Paralympics, the 2012 London Games, in the women's 200m sprint (bronze) and the long jump (silver). Jia is also a World Championships and Asian Games medalists, winning seven medals over five tournaments.
