= IPC Athletic Asia-Oceania Championship 2016 – Women's javelin throw =

The Women's javelin throw at the IPC Athletics Asia-Oceania Championship 2016 was held at the Dubai Police Club Stadium in Dubai from 7–12 March.

== Results ==
Legend

AS: Asian Record

WR: World Record

PB: Personal Best

SB: Season Best

=== F55/56 Final ===
Date- 07:March:2016

Time- 16:00

Rank	Name	Attempt 1	Attempt 2	Attempt 3	Attempt 4	Attempt 5	Attempt 6
1.	Hashemiyeh Motaghian (F56) Iran (IRI)	X	16.75 (655)	X	X	17.24 (690)	X
2.	Karam Jyoti (F55) India (IND)	11.62 (431)	9.82 (260)	11.23 (393)	11.21 (391)	X	10.88 (359)
3.	Famini (F56) Qatar (QAT)	11.99 (276)	11.97 (274)	X	X	12.66 (328)	11.68 (253)
