= IPC Athletic Asia-Oceania Championship 2016 – Women's 200 metres =

The Men's 200 meter Race at the IPC Athletics Asia-Oceania Championship 2016 was held at the Dubai Police Club Stadium in Dubai from 7–12 March.

== Results ==
Legend

AS: Asian Record

WR: World Record

PB: Personal Best

SB: Season Best

Fn-False Start

Q- Qualified for Finals

q- Qualified for Finals as per best performance

DNF- Did Not Finish

DSQ- Disqualified

=== T11 ===
==== Final ====
Date- 12:March:2016

Time- 16:45

Wind +0.2
Rank	Name	Reaction Time	Finish Time
1.	Jia Juntingxian(T11) Guide Shi Yang; China (CHN)	0.180; 0.180	28.18
2.	Chen Yan(T11) Guide Li Wen; China (CHN)	0.241; 0.173	26.99
3.	Kewalin Wannaruemon(T11) Guide Panya Makhumjai; Thailand (THA)	0.416; 0.298	26.99
4.	Pan Yu-Ting(T11) Guide Huang Te Tseng; Chinese Taipei (TPE)	0.314; 0.291	31.53

=== T12 ===
==== Final ====
Date- 12:March:2016

Time- 16:57

Wind +0.2
Rank	Name	Reaction Time	Finish Time
1.	Zhu Daqing(T12) Guide Hu Peng; China (CHN)	0.241; 0.179	26.19
2.	Joyleen Jeffrey(T12) Papua New Guinea (PNG)	-	32.36

=== T36 ===
==== Final ====
Date- 10:March:2016

Time- 17:08

Wind +0.2
Rank	Name	Reaction Time	Finish Time
1.	Yam Kwok Fan(T36) Hong Kong (HKG)		35.13
2.	Ywong Sze Yan (T36) Hong Kong (HKG)		37.12
3.	Yuki Kato(T36) Japan (JPN)		37.67

=== T44/47 ===
==== Final ====
Date- 12:March:2016

Time- 17:11

Wind -0.8
Rank	Name	Reaction Time	Finish Time
1.	L. Palliyagurunnanselage Amara I.(T47) Sri Lanka (SRI)		27.89
2.	Pagjiraporn Gagun (T47) Thailand (THA)		29.14
3.	Zahra Shahmohammadi(T47) Iran (IRI)		30.47

=== T54 ===
==== Final ====
Date- 10:March:2016

Time- 16:52

Wind -0.9
Rank	Name	Reaction Time	Finish Time
1.	Keiko Konishi(T54) Japan (JPN)		35.47
2.	Chen Yu-Lein(T54) Chinese Taipei (TPE)		35.53
