= IPC Athletic Asia-Oceania Championship 2016 – Women's 100 metres =

The Men's 100 meter Race at the IPC Athletics Asia-Oceania Championship 2016 was held at the Dubai Police Club Stadium in Dubai from 7–12 March.

== Results ==
Legend

AS: Asian Record

WR: World Record

PB: Personal Best

SB: Season Best

Fn-False Start

Q- Qualified for Finals

q- Qualified for Finals as per best performance

DNF- Did Not Finish

DSQ- Disqualified

=== T11 ===
==== Final ====
Date- 10:March:2016

Time- 17:22

Wind -0.8
| Rank | Name | Reaction Time | Finish Time |
|---|---|---|---|
| 1. | Jia Juntingxian(T11) Guide Shi Yang China (CHN) | 0.238; 0.155 | 12.54 |
| 2. | Chen Yan(T11) Guide Li Wen China (CHN) | 0.244; 0.214 | 12.66 |
| 3. | Kewalin Wannaruemon(T11) Guide Panya Makhumjai Thailand (THA) | 0.378; 0.274 | 13.18 |
| 4. | Pan Yu-Ting(T11) Guide Huang Te Tseng Chinese Taipei (TPE) | 0.533; 0.319 | 15.22 |

=== T12 ===
==== Final ====
Date- 10:March:2016

Time- 17:34

Wind -1.2
| Rank | Name | Reaction Time | Finish Time |
|---|---|---|---|
| 1. | Zhu Daqing(T12) Guide Hu Peng China (CHN) | 0.216; 0.206 | 12.48 |
| 2. | Joyleen Jeffrey(T12) Papua New Guinea (PNG) | 0.547 | 15.22 |

=== T37 ===
==== Final ====
Date- 08:March:2016

Time- 18:20

Wind -0.5
| Rank | Name | Reaction Time | Finish Time |
|---|---|---|---|
| 1. | YAM Kwok Fan(T36) Hong Kong (HKG) | - | 16.46 |
| 2. | YWONG Sze Yan(T36) Hong Kong (HKG) | - | 17.56 |
| 3. | KATO Yuki(T36) Japan (JPN) | - | 17.84 |
| 4. | ALSUWAIDI Khadija(T37) Japan (JPN) | - | 23.15 |

=== T47 ===
==== Final ====
Date- 08:March:2016

Time- 18:42

Wind -0.6
| Rank | Name | Reaction Time | Finish Time |
|---|---|---|---|
| 1. | SHAHMOHAMMADI Zahra(T47) Iran (IRI) | - | 14.57 |

=== T54 ===
==== Final ====
Date- 08:March:2016

Time- 16:42

Wind +0.6
| Rank | Name | Reaction Time | Finish Time |
|---|---|---|---|
| 1. | KONISHI Keiko(T53) Japan (JPN) | - | 18.29 |
| 2. | CHEN Yu-Lien(T54) Chinese Taipei (TPE) | - | 18.51 |
