= IPC Athletic Asia-Oceania Championship 2016 – Men's long jump =

The Men's 100 meter Race at the IPC Athletics Asia-Oceania Championship 2016 was held at the Dubai Police Club Stadium in Dubai from 7–12 March.

== Results ==
Legend

AS: Asian Record

WR: World Record

PB: Personal Best

SB: Season Best

=== T20 Final ===
Date- 07:March:2016 Time- 16:45

Rank	Name	Attempt 1	Attempt 2	Attempt 3	Attempt 4	Attempt 5	Attempt 6
1.	ROMLY Abdul Latif(T20) Malaysia (MAS)	6.52	6.73	X	6.62	6.79	7.07
2.	SHARAHELI Asaad (T20) Saudi Arabia (KSA)	X	6.63	6.72	X	X	6.82
3.	YAMAGUCHI Mitsuo (T20) Japan (JPN)	X	X	6.72	6.37	-	6.46
4.	ABDULRAHEEM Abdulla Mohamed (T20) Qatar (QAT)	5.21	5.34	5.23	5.14	5.29	5.56
5.	RANGI Ethan (T20) New Zealand (NZL)	X	4.62	4.86	4.75	X	4.32
6.	TONG Hio Sam (T20) Macau (MAC)	4.22	3.89	3.91	4.10	3.72	-
