= Sandeep Singh Maan =

Indian paralympic athlete

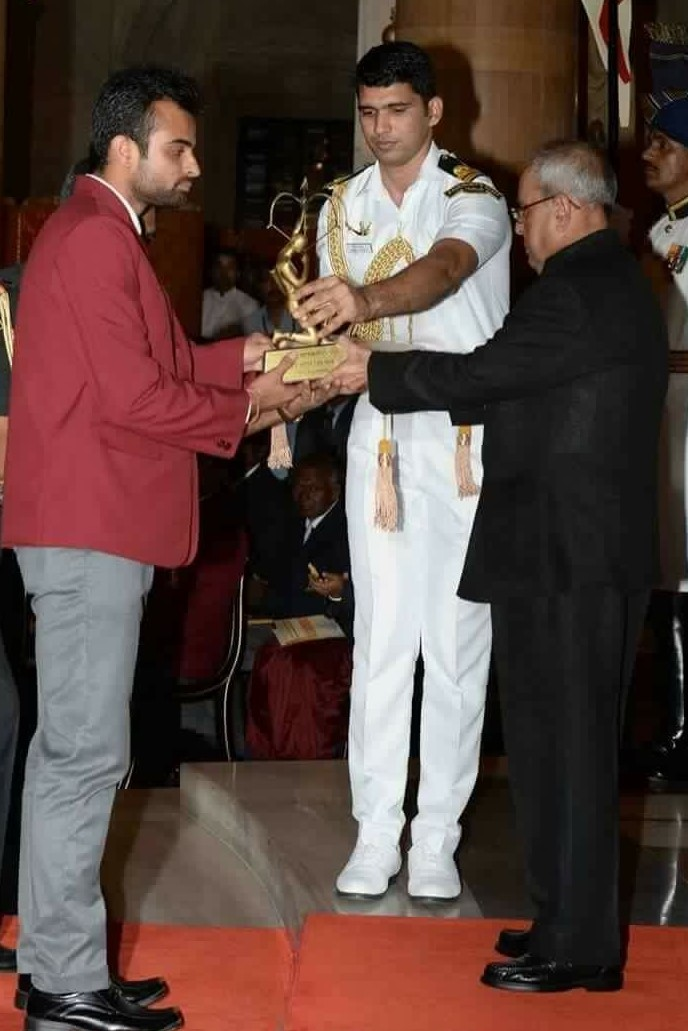
- Sandeep Maan receiving ARJUNA AWARD

Personal information
- Nationality: Indian
- Born: 16 July 1993 (age 33)

Sport
- Country: India
- Sport: Para Athletics
- Events: 100m, 200, 400m, Long Jump
- Coached by: Satyapal Singh
Medal record
Asian Para Games
Bronze medal – third place	2018 Indonesia	400m T46
Silver medal – second place	2014 Incheon	400m T46
Silver medal – second place	2014 Incheon	200m T46
Silver medal – second place	2010 Guangzhou	400m T46
Asian Para Athletics Championships
Silver medal – second place	2016 Dubai	200m T46
Asian Championship
Silver medal – second place	2016	200m T46
International Championships
Gold medal – first place	2017 Paris	400m T46
Gold medal – first place	2017 Paris	800m T46
Silver medal – second place	2013 Germany	Long Jump T46
Silver medal – second place	2013 Germany	200m T46
Silver medal – second place	2012 Kuwait	200m T46
Silver medal – second place	2012 Kuwait	400m T46
IWAS World Games
Gold medal – first place	2011 Dubai	200m T46
Gold medal – first place	2011 Dubai	400m T46
Gold medal – first place	2009 Bangalore	4x400m relay T46

Sandeep Singh Maan (born 16 July 1993) is an Indian Para athlete competing in Men's 100m, 200m, 400m and Long Jump events in the T46 category. He is bronze medallist in Asian Para Games 2018 held in Jakarta, Indonesia. And three time silver medallist from the Asian Para Games; he won them at the 2010 and 2014 editions in Guangzhou, China and Incheon, Korea, respectively. He received the Arjuna award in 2016 for his outstanding sporting achievements, the Maharana pratap Award in 2012 from state sports council of Rajasthan, and the Aravali Award in 2019. He is a national record holder in 200m and 400m since 2012 . And now his goal is towards winning medal in coming Para Commonwealth games 2022.

== Early life and background ==
Sandeep was born in 1993 in Hanumangarh, Rajasthan and suffered from a dysfunctional left arm by birth. He was inclined to sport from a very early age and used to compete in running events with regular able-bodied individuals during his school days. He started winning multiple medals across different events. Following his impressive performances agaiable-bodied competitors, Sandeep stepped into sports for the disabled and soon started representing India at the international level in Para sports. His early training gave by Dronacharya Awardee R. D. Singh.

== Career ==
Sandeep gained national prominence after winning the silver medal for India at the 2010 Asian Para Games in Guangzhou, China. He replicated his fine form the following year at the 2011 IWAS World Games in Sharjah (UAE), where he won gold medals in both 200m and 400m running events with a timing of 51.65 sec and 23.24 sec, respectively.

Sandeep began 2014 with a bang, winning gold medals in both 200m and 400m and even securing a bronze in Long Jump at the FAZAA International Athletics Competition in Dubai (UAE). The same year Sandeep added to his ever increasing international medal tally when he won two silver medals in his native running events at the 2014 Asian Para Games.

Sandeep trains at the Nehru Stadium in New Delhi under coach Satyapal Singh. He has cited fellow Indian para-athlete and Paralympic gold medalist Devendra Jhajharia as an influence. Sandeep is a participant in the Asian Para Games and received the Arjuna Award in 2016. Since 2012, he has held the national records in the 200m and 400m.
