= Kissanapong Tisuwan =

Thai Paralympic athlete (born 1999)

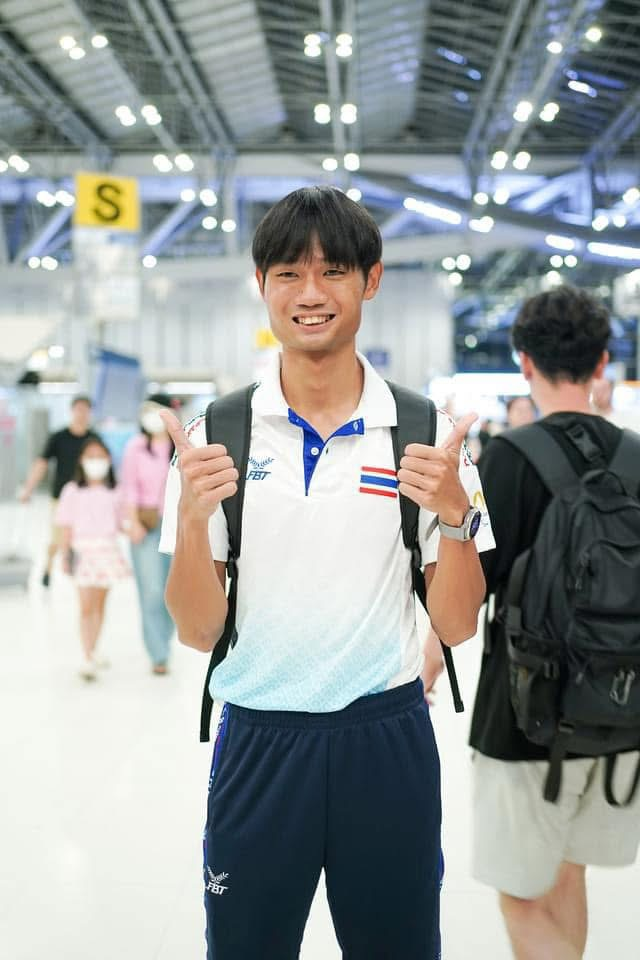
- Kissanapong Tisuwan, 2024

Personal information
- Born: 3 October 1999 (age 26) Phitsanulok, Thailand

Sport
- Country: Thailand
- Sport: Para-athletics
- Disability: Vision impairment
- Disability class: T12
- Events: 4 × 400 metres relay; 400 metres; 800 metres; 1500 metres
Medal record
World Championships
Bronze medal – third place	2025 New Delhi	400 m T12
Asian Para Games
Bronze medal – third place	2022 Hangzhou	400 m T12
ASEAN Para Games
Gold medal – first place	2023 Cambodia	4 × 400 m relay
Gold medal – first place	2023 Cambodia	800 m T12
Gold medal – first place	2023 Cambodia	1500 m T12
Silver medal – second place	2023 Cambodia	400 m T12

Kissanapong Tisuwan (born 3 October 1999) is a visually impaired Thai Paralympic athlete competing in T12 classification sprinting events. He is a bronze medalist at the World Para Athletics Championships and Asian Para Games and a three-time gold medalist at the ASEAN Para Games. He also competed at the 2024 Summer Paralympics.

== Career ==
Kissanapong competed at the 2023 ASEAN Para Games, where he won at least four medals, with three of them gold, particularly the 800 m event, as well as the silver medal in the 400 m event. At the delayed 2022 Asian Para Games held in Hangzhou, China, he won the bronze medal in the 400 m events. He represented Thailand at the 2024 Summer Paralympics in Paris, France, in which he competed in the men's 400 metres event.

Kissanapong competed at the 2025 World Para Athletics Championships held in New Delhi, India, where he won the bronze medal in the men's 400 metres T12 event following the disqualification of Mahdi Afri.
