= IPC Athletic Asia-Oceania Championship 2016 – Men's discus throw =

The men's discus throw at the IPC Athletics Asia-Oceania Championship 2016 was held at the Dubai Police Club Stadium in Dubai from 7–12 March.

== Results ==
Legend

AS: Asian Record

WR: World Record

PB: Personal Best

SB: Season Best

=== F33/34 Final ===
Date- 07:March:2016

Time- 17:20

| Rank | Name | Attempt 1 | Attempt 2 | Attempt 3 | Attempt 4 | Attempt 5 | Attempt 6 |
|---|---|---|---|---|---|---|---|
| 1. | Hani Alnakhji (F33) Saudi Arabia (KSA) | 24.08 (665) | 24.83 (705) | 25.98 (762) | 27.44 (828) | 26.48 (785) | 26.90 (804) |
| 2. | Abdulqadir Abdulrahman (F34) Qatar (QAT) | X | 29.51 (566) | X | 30.72 (619) | X | 29.55 (568) |
| 3. | Ahmed Alhousani (F33) United Arab Emirates (UAE) | 21.05 (490) | X | X | 22.78 (592) | X | X |
| 4. | Mehdi Alizadeh (F33) Iran (IRI) | 21.01 (487) | 18.92 (361) | 18.95 (363) | 20.16 (436) | 18.54 (338) | 20.54 (459) |
| 5. | Abdullah Hayayei (F34) United Arab Emirates (UAE) | 22.49 (252) | 24.69 (347) | 26.02 (407) | X | X | 25.82 (407) |
| 6. | Hassan Ali Obaid Malaleih (F34) United Arab Emirates (UAE) | X | X | X | 13.24 (86) | 12.09 (55) | X |
