= Karisma Evi Tiarani =

Indonesian Paralympic sprinter

Personal information
- Nationality: Indonesian
- Born: 19 January 2001 (age 25) Boyolali, Central Java, Indonesia

Sport
- Country: Indonesia
- Sport: Paralympic athletics
- Disability class: T42
- Event: Sprint
Medal record
Women's para athletics
Representing Indonesia
Paralympic Games
Silver medal – second place	2024 Paris	100 m T63
World Championships
Gold medal – first place	2019 Dubai	100 m T63
Gold medal – first place	2024 Kobe	100 m T63
Silver medal – second place	2025 New Delhi	100 m T63
World Abilitysport Games
Gold medal – first place	2023 Nakhon Ratchasima	100 m T42/46/62
Asian Para Games
Gold medal – first place	2018 Jakarta	100 m T42/63
Gold medal – first place	2026 Aichi–Nagoya	100 m T42/63
Silver medal – second place	2018 Jakarta	Long jump T42–44/61–64
Silver medal – second place	2022 Hangzhou	100 m T63/64
Bronze medal – third place	2018 Jakarta	4×100 m universal relay
Bronze medal – third place	2026 Aichi–Nagoya	Long jump T42/63/64
ASEAN Para Games
Gold medal – first place	2017 Kuala Lumpur	Long jump T44
Gold medal – first place	2022 Surakarta	100 m T42/44
Gold medal – first place	2022 Surakarta	200 m T42/44
Gold medal – first place	2023 Cambodia	200 m T42/44
Gold medal – first place	2023 Cambodia	400 m T42/44
Gold medal – first place	2023 Cambodia	Long jump T42/44
Silver medal – second place	2017 Kuala Lumpur	100 m T44
Silver medal – second place	2017 Kuala Lumpur	200 m T44
Silver medal – second place	2022 Surakarta	Long jump T42/44/64
Asian Youth Para Games
Gold medal – first place	2017 Dubai	100 m T42/44

Karisma Evi Tiarani (born 19 January 2001) is an Indonesian Paralympic sprinter. She finished 2nd at the 100 metres T63 at 2024 Summer Paralympics.

== Education ==
As at 2021, Tiarani was a student of Universitas Sebelas Maret (UNS) Surakarta where she was studying Communication Science.

== Career ==
Born with a type of Impairment Leg length difference, Tiarani took up Para athletics in 2014 at the Central Java Student Education and Training Centre in Surakarta, Indonesia, together with her coach Slamet Widodo where she was invited to attend a Para sports tryout. She contracted flu soon after arriving at the 2019 World Para Athletics Championships in Dubai, United Arab Emirates. Despite the illness disrupting her preparations for the event, she went on to win gold in the T63 100m. She also won a further three medals, including gold in the T42/63 100m, at the 2018 Asian Para Games in Indonesia. She received a sporting achievement award from the Indonesian Ministry of Youth and Sports for her achievements at international events in 2018/19.

== Awards and nominations ==
Award	Year	Category	Result	Ref.
Golden Award SIWO PWI	2019	Best Female Para Athlete	Nominated	
Indonesian Sport Awards	2018	Favorite Female Para Athlete Individual	Nominated	

== Competition record ==
Year	Competition	Venue	Position	Event	Notes
2017	Asian Youth Para Games	Dubai, United Arab Emirates	1st	100 m T42/44	16.46
2018	Asian Para Games	Jakarta, Indonesia	1st	100 m T63	14.98
2018	Asian Para Games	Jakarta, Indonesia	2nd	Long jump T42–44/61–64	4.03
2018	Asian Para Games	Jakarta, Indonesia	3rd	4 × 100 m universal relay	50.09
2019	World Championships	Dubai, United Arab Emirates	1st	100 m T42/T63	14.72
2021	Paralympics	Tokyo, Japan	4th	100 m T63	14.83
2022	Nottwil Grand Prix	Nottwil, Switzerland	1st	100 m T42/63/64	14.64
2023	Dubai Grand Prix	Dubai, United Arab Emirates	1st	100 m T42/63/64	14.86
2023	ASEAN Para Games	Phnom Penh, Cambodia	1st	200 m T42/T44	-
2023	ASEAN Para Games	Phnom Penh, Cambodia	1st	400 m T42/44	1:11.22
2023	ASEAN Para Games	Phnom Penh, Cambodia	1st	Long jump T42/44	-
2023	World Championships	Paris, France	4th	100 m T63	14.76
2023	Asian Para Games	Hangzhou, China	2nd	100 m T63/64	14.37
2023	World Abilitysport Games	Nakhon Ratchasima, Thailand	1st	100 m T42/63/64	14.70
2024	World Championships	Kobe, Japan	1st	100 m T63	14.65
2024	Paralympics	Paris, France	2nd	100m T42/63	14.34
2026	Asian Para Games	Nagoya, Japan	1st	100 m T63	14.59
2026	Asian Para Games	Nagoya, Japan	3rd	Long jump T42/T44/T61-T64	3.91
