= Siti Noor Iasah Mohamad Ariffin =

Malaysian Paralympic athlete

Personal information
- Nationality: Malaysian
- Born: 22 September 1989 (age 36) Johor Bahru

Sport
- Country: Malaysia
- Sport: Track and field
- Disability class: T20
Medal record
Women's para athletics
Representing Malaysia
IPC World Championships
Bronze medal – third place	2015 Doha	400m - T20
Asian Para Games
Gold medal – first place	2018 Jakarta	400m - T20
Gold medal – first place	2014 Incheon	400m - T20
Silver medal – second place	2014 Incheon	Long jump - T20
ASEAN Para Games
Gold medal – first place	2017 Kuala Lumpur	400m - T20
Gold medal – first place	2017 Kuala Lumpur	800m - T20
Gold medal – first place	2015 Singapore	400m - T20
Bronze medal – third place	2015 Singapore	Long jump - F20

Siti Noor Iasah binti Mohamad Ariffin (born 22 September 1989) is a Malaysian paralympic athlete who competing mainly in category T20 in sprinting and long jump events in international level events.

She competed at the 2016 Summer Paralympics and 2020 Summer Paralympics.
