= Ni Made Arianti Putri =

Indonesian para sprinter (born 1996)

Personal information
- Nationality: Indonesian
- Born: 4 February 1996 (age 30) Denpasar, Bali, Indonesia

Sport
- Country: Indonesia
- Sport: Paralympic athletics
- Disability class: T12, T13
- Event: Sprint
Medal record
Women's para-athletics
Representing Indonesia
World Championships
| Silver medal – second place | 2025 New Delhi | Universal 4 × 100 m relay |
| Bronze medal – third place | 2024 Kobe | 100 m T12 |
Asian Para Games
| Gold medal – first place | 2022 Hangzhou | 100 m T12 |
| Silver medal – second place | 2018 Jakarta | 100 m T12 |
| Silver medal – second place | 2022 Hangzhou | 4×100 m universal relay |
ASEAN Para Games
| Gold medal – first place | 2022 Surakarta | 100 m T12 |
| Gold medal – first place | 2022 Surakarta | 200 m T12 |
| Gold medal – first place | 2023 Cambodia | 100 m T12 |
| Gold medal – first place | 2023 Cambodia | 200 m T12 |
| Silver medal – second place | 2017 Kuala Lumpur | 100 m T13 |
| Silver medal – second place | 2017 Kuala Lumpur | 200 m T13 |
| Bronze medal – third place | 2022 Surakarta | 400 m T11/14 |
- Updated on 5 October 2025

Ni Made Arianti Putri (born 4 February 1996) is an Indonesian sprinter who competes in the T12 classification, having been previously classified as T13. She has won medals for Indonesia at the ASEAN Para Games, Asian Para Games, and the World Para Athletics Championships.

== Early life ==
Ni Made Arianti Putri was born in Denpasar, Bali on 4 February 1996. Blind since birth, she is squint-eyed in her right eye, while her left one has cataracts, leaving it dysfunctional. As a result of her condition, she was bullied by her peers. She would find solace in the world of athletics.

== Career ==
At the 2017 ASEAN Para Games, Putri won the silver medal in the 100 m and 200 m events in the T13 category. She then competed at the 2018 Asian Para Games, where she won the silver medal in the 100 m and 400 m events.

In 2022, Putri returned to the ASEAN Para Games and won the gold medal in the 100 m and 200 m events and the bronze medal in the 400 m event. In the 2023 edition, she won the gold medal in the 100 m and 200 m events. She also competed in the delayed 2022 Asian Para Games and won a gold medal in the 100 m and a silver medal in the 4 × 100 m universal relay.

At the 2024 World Championships, Putri won the bronze medal in the 100 m, making it her first medal at the World Championships. At the 2024 Summer Paralympics, she competed in the 100 metres T12 event, where she was eliminated in Heat 3.

In 2025, Putri competed at the 2025 World Para Athletics Championships. After competing in the 100 metres and 200 metres, she became part of the Indonesian team that won the silver medal in the universal 4 × 100 metres relay event.
