= IPC Athletic Asia-Oceania Championship 2016 – Men's 1,500 metres =

The Men's 200 meter Race at the IPC Athletics Asia-Oceania Championship 2016 was held at the Dubai Police Club Stadium in Dubai from 7–12 March.

== Results ==
Legend

AS: Asian record

WR: World record

PB: Personal best

SB: Season best

Fn-False start

Q- Qualified for finals

q- Qualified for finals as per best performance

DNF- Did not finish

DSQ- Disqualified

=== T20 final ===
Date- 07:March:2016 Time- 18:35

Rank	Name	Finish time
1.	NAKAGAWA Daisuke (T20) Japan (JPN)	4:08:04
2.	YAMANOUCHI Yusuke (T20) Japan (JPN)	4:11:21
3.	KIMURA Yuya (T20) Japan (JPN)	4:15:41
4.	AHMED Thamer (T20) Saudi Arabia (KSA)	4:18:41
5.	IBRAHIM Muhd Nurdin (T20) Malaysia (MAS)	4:21:26 SB
6.	LO Wai Fong (T20) Macau (MAC)	4:59:88
