= Cendy Asusano =

Filipino para-athlete (born 1990)

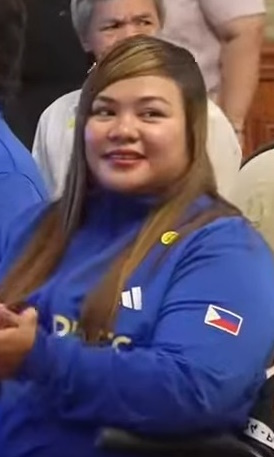
- Asusano in 2024

Personal information
- Nationality: Filipino
- Born: April 7, 1990 (age 36)
- Home town: Donsol, Sorsogon, Philippines

Sport
- Sport: Para-athletics
- Events: Javelin throw; Shot put; Discus throw
Medal record
Women's para athletics
Representing Philippines
ASEAN Para Games
| Gold medal – first place | 2017 Kuala Lumpur | Shot put F54 |
| Gold medal – first place | 2017 Kuala Lumpur | Discus throw F54 |
| Gold medal – first place | 2017 Kuala Lumpur | Javelin throw F54/55 |
| Gold medal – first place | 2022 Solo | Shot put F54 |
| Gold medal – first place | 2022 Solo | Javelin throw F54 |
| Gold medal – first place | 2023 Cambodia | Shot put F54 |
| Gold medal – first place | 2023 Cambodia | Javelin throw F54 |
| Gold medal – first place | 2025 Nakhon Ratchasima | Javelin throw F54 |
| Gold medal – first place | 2025 Nakhon Ratchasima | Shot put F54 |
| Silver medal – second place | 2025 Nakhon Ratchasima | Discus throw F54 |
| Bronze medal – third place | 2023 Cambodia | Discus throw F54 |

Cendy Lovendino Asusano (born April 7, 1990) is a Filipino para-athlete who competes in the javelin throw.

== Career ==
Asusano have competed in the ASEAN Para Games where she also competes in the shot put and discus throw. She debuted in the Southeast Asian competition's 2017 edition. In 2022 edition, she bagged two gold medals in javelin throw and shot put, but was disqualified on the discus throw due to a loose strap. She ended with two golds and a bronze in the 2023 edition.

She would finish fourth in the javelin throw at the 2024 World Para Athletics Championships in Kobe, Japan.

Asusano finished fourth at the 2024 Summer Paralympics in Paris. She threw a distance of 15.05 meters establishing a new personal best.

== Personal life ==
Asusano hails from Donsol, Sorsogon who would become a resident of Pasig. She is a wheelchair user. As of 2017, Asusano has a daughter with Juanito Mingarine a national wheelchair basketball player.
