= Siti Noor Radiah Ismail =

Malaysian Paralympic athlete

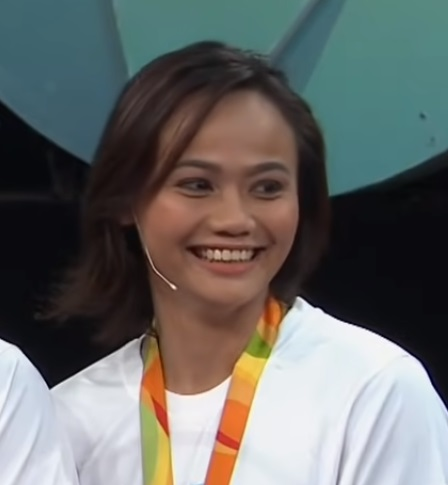

Personal information
- Nationality: Malaysian
- Born: 3 November 1993 (age 32) Segamat, Johor

Sport
- Country: Malaysia
- Sport: Track and field
- Disability class: (T20)
- Event: long jump
Medal record
Paralympic athletics
Representing Malaysia
Paralympic Games
Bronze medal – third place	2016 Rio de Janeiro	Long jump T20
Asian Para Games
Gold medal – first place	2014 Incheon	Long jump T20
Silver medal – second place	2018 Jakarta	Long jump T20
ASEAN Para Games
Gold medal – first place	2017 Kuala Lumpur	Long jump T20
Silver medal – second place	2015 Singapore	400m T20
Silver medal – second place	2015 Singapore	Long jump F20

Siti Noor Radiah binti Ismail AMN (born 3 November 1993) is a Malaysian Paralympian who won a bronze medal at the 2016 Paralympic Games in Rio de Janeiro.

== Honours and awards ==
=== Honours of Malaysia ===
- Malaysia
  - Member of the Order of the Defender of the Realm (AMN) (2017)
- 2016 Female Paralympian of the Year at the Malaysian Sports Awards
