= 2011 IPC Athletics World Championships – Women's 4 × 100 metres relay =

The women's 4 x 100 metres relay at the 2011 IPC Athletics World Championships was held at the QEII Stadium on 24 and 28 January 2011.

== Medalists ==
Class	Gold	Silver	Bronze
T11−13	Brazil; Ádria Rocha Santos; Ana Tercia Soares; Jerusa Geber Santos; Terezinha Guilhermina	China; Chen Yan; Jia Juntingxian; Zhu Daqing; Wu Chunmiao	
T35−38	Ukraine; Viktoriya Kravchenko; Maryna Snisar; Oksana Krechunyak; Inna Stryzhak	Russia; Anastasiya Ovsyannikova; Svetlana Sergeeva; Elena Ivanova; Margarita Koptilova	Great Britain; Hazel Robson; Bethany Woodward; Katrina Hart; Jenny McLoughlin
