= Shari Haji Juma'at =

Bruneian Paralympic athlete

Shari Juma'at
Personal information
- Full name: Shari bin Haji Juma'at
- Born: Brunei

Sport
- Sport: Athletics
- Events: Javelin, Discus
Medal record
Track and field (F55)
Representing Brunei
Asian Para Games
| Bronze medal – third place | 2014 Incheon | Javelin throw – F55/56 |
| Silver medal – second place | 2010 Guangzhou | Javelin throw – F54/56 |
ASEAN Para Games
| Bronze medal – third place | 2023 Phnom Penh | Discus throw – F55 |
| Bronze medal – third place | 2023 Phnom Penh | Javelin throw – F55 |
| Bronze medal – third place | 2022 Surakarta | Discus throw – F54/F55 |
| Bronze medal – third place | 2022 Surakarta | Javelin throw – F54/F55 |
| Bronze medal – third place | 2017 Kuala Lumpur | Javelin throw – F55 |

Shari bin Haji Juma'at is a Bruneian para-athlete specializing in the F55 classification. He competes in javelin throw, discus throw, and shot put events and is best known for representing Brunei at the 2012 Summer Paralympics. Shari is a multi-medalist in the Asian Para Games and the ASEAN Para Games, and one of Brunei's most accomplished Paralympic athletes.

== Career ==
Shari began his athletics career in 1990, competing as a para-athlete in field events.

On 18 December 2010, during the men's javelin throw F54/56 event at the 2010 Asian Para Games, Shari won a silver medal.

In 2012, Shari gained distinction as the world's highest-ranking javelin thrower in the F54/56 disability category. He achieved a throw of 29.83 metres (97.9 ft) in the men's Javelin F55 during the 1st Malaysia Open Para Athletics Championship in April 2012, sparking hopes in the country for the potential acquisition of its first medal in either Olympic or Paralympic events. At the London 2012 Summer Paralympics, he was the only competitor from Brunei. He placed eighth in the men's F54-56 javelin throw.

On 23 April 2013, Shari won Brunei's first gold medal in the China Open Athletics Championship. In the competition co-hosted by the International Paralympic Committee and the China Administration of Sports for Persons with Disabilities (CASPD), ten competitors, including Shari, are representing the Sultanate. Shari competed in the F55 shotput competition. On the following day, he took part in the men's javelin throw F54-56 event during the 2013 IPC Athletics World Championships in Lyon.

On 20 October 2014, at the 2014 Asian Para Games in Incheon, Shari won bronze with a throw of 25.28 meters in the men's javelin throw F55/56 event. For their prospects of winning a gold medal at the 2017 ASEAN Para Games in Kuala Lumpur, Brunei was counting on the combination of Alihan Muda and Shari. He finished fourth in the men's discus throw F55 with a distance of 26.53 metres, just missing out on a podium spot. Despite this, he won a bronze medal in the men's javelin throw F55 event.

From 30 July to 6 August 2021, Surakarta hosted the 2022 ASEAN Para Games. Shari was one of 22 Bruneian athletes competing in the competition. After placing third in the men's javelin throw F54/F55 event, he won his second bronze medal in the men's discus throw F54/F55 event. He and his contingent were welcomed like heroes when they returned to Brunei International Airport in Bandar Seri Begawan.

At the 2023 ASEAN Para Games in Phnom Penh, Shari served as the national flag bearer during the opening ceremony. He won a bronze medal in the men's discus throw F55 on 4 June 2023, setting a new personal best and national record of 25.36 meters. He later earned another bronze medal in the men's javelin throw F55 with a throw of 22.16 meters.

He competed again at the 2022 Asian Para Games in Hangzhou, China (held in October, 2023), representing Brunei in the shot put F55, discus F54/55/56, and javelin F55 events.
