= Trịnh Công Luận =

Vietnamese Paralympic discus thrower

Personal information
- Born: 6 January 1972 (age 54) Cà Mau Province, Vietnam

Sport
- Sport: Paralympic athletics
- Disability: Polio
Medal record
Representing Vietnam
Asian Para Games
Silver medal – second place	2010 Guangzhou	Shot put F54-56
ASEAN Para Games
Gold medal – first place	2022 Surakarta	Javelin throw F56
Gold medal – first place	2022 Surakarta	Discus throw F56
Gold medal – first place	2023 Phnom Penh	Discus throw F56
Gold medal – first place	2023 Phnom Penh	Javelin throw F56

Trịnh Công Luận (born 6 January 1972) is a Vietnamese male Paralympic discus thrower. He won the silver medal at the 2010 Asian Para Games in the F54-56 classification .
