= Jaideep =

Jaideep or Jaidip is an Indian name that may refer to:

- Jaideep Ahlawat (born 1980), Indian film actor
- Jaideep Chopra (born 1971), Indian film director, producer and writer
- Jaideep Deswal (born 1989), Indian Paralympic athlete
- Jaideep Mehrotra (born 1954), Indian artist
- Jaidip Mukerjea (born 1942), Indian tennis player
- Jaideep Patel, Indian medical doctor
- Jaideep Prabhu (born 1967), Professor of Business and Enterprise at the University of Cambridge, England
- Jaideep Sahni (born 1968), Indian screenwriter
- Jaideep Singh (born 1987), Indian-Japanese heavyweight kickboxer and mixed martial artist
- Jaideep Srivastava (born 1959) Indian-American computer scientist, professor of Computer Science at the University of Minnesota
- Jaideep Varma, Indian writer, screenwriter and filmmaker
