= Martin Losu =

Indonesian Paralympic athlete

Personal information
- Nationality: Indonesian
- Born: 15 March 1987 (age 39) Pekanbaru, Indonesia

Sport
- Country: Indonesia
- Sport: T46 Athletics
Medal record
Men's Cycling
Representing Indonesia
Asian Para Games
| Bronze medal – third place | 2018 Jakarta | Men's C5 Road Cycling Road Race |
- Updated on 12 October 2018

Martin Losu (Marthin Losu, born 15 March 1987) is an Indonesian athlete.

== Biography ==
Losu was born in Pekanbaru on 15 March 1987. He competes in the T46 events, defined by the International Paralympic Committee as encompassing "athletes with unilateral upper limb impairment" meeting specific standards, impaired upper limb range of motion, or "impaired upper limb muscle power", as well as athletes with bilateral impairment meeting certain criteria.

In 2008, Losu was studying at Lancang Kuning University. At the 2008 National Athletics Competition for the Disabled (Pekan Olahraga Cacat Nasional), he won two gold medals. He followed this with three golds at the 2008 ASEAN ParaGames in Thailand. For these accomplishments, he received a scholarship from the government of Riau. That year he took a position as an athletics trainer for the provincial government's Department of Youth and Sports.

Losu spent approximately six months training in Riau for the 2009 ASEAN ParaGames in Malaysia, which was unsubsidised by the government. At the Games he won a silver medal, for which he received a financial reward from the government of Riau. At the 2011 ASEAN ParaGames in Surakarta, he competed in the 100-metre, 200-metre, 400-metre, 4x100-metre, and 4x400-metre events. Losu set a new regional record for the T46 200-metre race with a time of 23.05 seconds, as well as a regional record for the T46 100-metre race with a time of 11.14 seconds.

In June 2012, he began training to represent Indonesia at the 2012 Summer Paralympics in London, together with two other athletics competitors (including Setyo Budi Hartanto), a powerlifter, a swimmer and a table tennis player.
