= Sasirawan Inthachot =

Thai Paralympic athlete

Personal information
- Born: 3 January 2003 (age 23) Sisaket, Thailand

Sport
- Country: Thailand
- Sport: Para athletics
- Disability class: T47
- Events: 100 metres; 200 metres; 400 metres
Medal record
Women's athletics
Representing Thailand
Summer Paralympics
Bronze medal – third place	2024 Paris	200 m T47
World Championships
Silver medal – second place	2023 Paris	200 m
Asian Para Games
Gold medal – first place	2022 Hangzhou	200 m
Bronze medal – third place	2022 Hangzhou	100 m
ASEAN Para Games
Gold medal – first place	2023 Phnom Penh	100 m
Gold medal – first place	2023 Phnom Penh	200 m
Gold medal – first place	2023 Phnom Penh	400 m

Sasirawan Inthachot (born 3 January 2003) is a Thai para-athlete who specializes in sprint events. She won a bronze medal at the 2024 Summer Paralympics in Paris. She had also won a bronze medal in the 2023 World Para Athletics Championships and two medals at the 2022 Asian Para Games and three medals at the 2023 ASEAN Para Games.

== Athletics career ==
Sasirawan started para-athletics at the age of 18. She is classified T47 for track events. She won her first international competition medals, the gold medal in the 100 m, 200 m, and 400 m events at the 2023 ASEAN Para Games. She then won a bronze medal in the women's 200 m T47, at the 2023 World Para Athletics Championships in Paris, France. Three months later, at the 2022 Asian Para Games, she won the bronze medal in the 100 m event and the gold medal in the 200 m event.

At the 2024 Summer Paralympics, Sasirawan won the bronze medal in the women's 200 m T47.
