= Setyo Budi Hartanto =

Indonesian athlete (born 1986)

Personal information
- Nationality: Indonesian
- Born: 6 May 1986 (age 40) Temanggung, Central Java, Indonesia
- Height: 1.73 m (5 ft 8 in) (2006)
- Weight: 53 kg (117 lb) (2006)

Sport
- Country: Indonesia
- Sport: Athletics
- Events: Long jump; High jump
Medal record
Men's para athletics
Representing Indonesia
World Championships
| Bronze medal – third place | 2015 Doha | Long jump T47 |
Asian Para Games
| Silver medal – second place | 2018 Jakarta | Long jump T45/46/47 |
| Bronze medal – third place | 2010 Guangzhou | Long jump F46 |
Asian Championships
| Bronze medal – third place | 2016 Dubai | 100 m T47 |
ASEAN Para Games
| Gold medal – first place | 2015 Singapore | 100 m T47 |
| Gold medal – first place | 2015 Singapore | 4×100 m T42–47 |
| Gold medal – first place | 2015 Singapore | Long jump T45–47 |
| Gold medal – first place | 2015 Singapore | Triple jump T45–47 |
| Gold medal – first place | 2017 Kuala Lumpur | Long jump T46/47 |
| Gold medal – first place | 2017 Kuala Lumpur | Triple jump T46 |
| Gold medal – first place | 2022 Surakarta | Triple jump f47 |
- Updated on 9 February 2021

Setyo Budi Hartanto (also Setio Budi Hartanto; born 6 May 1986) is an Indonesian athlete who competes in long jump and high jump. He competed at the 2012 Summer Paralympic Games.

== Biography ==
Hartanto comes from Temanggung, Central Java, and was born on 6 May 1986. His parents are Muhtarom (father) and Muzaidah, both of whom are fishmongers. After finishing his studies at Muhammadiyah 1 Senior High School in Temanggung in 2004, he moved to the Doctor Suharto Rehabilitation Centre in Surakarta.

At the centre, a staff member named Azis suggested that Hartanto take up long jumping, a suggestion Hartanto agreed to. Hartanto competes in T10 high jump and long jump. In 2006 he was 1.73 m (5 ft 8 in) tall and weighed 53 kilograms (117 lb).

Hartanto received his first medal, a silver at the National Athletics Competition for the Disabled (Pekan Olahraga Cacat Nasional), in 2004. In December 2005 he won a gold at the third ASEAN Para Games in Manila, with a jump distance of 6.4 metres (21 ft). Hartanto was one of six athletes from Central Java who competed in the 2006 FESPIC Games. At the 2011 ASEAN Para Games in Surakarta, Hartanto received four silver medals.

In June 2012 he began training to represent Indonesia at the 2012 Summer Paralympics in London, together with two other athletics competitors, a powerlifter, a swimmer, and a table tennis player. As of 16 July 2012 Hartanto was one of four Indonesian athletes at the 2012 Paralympic games, along with Ni Nengah Widiasih (powerlifting), David Jacobs (table tennis), and Agus Ngaimin (swimming). He competed in Men's Long Jump - F46 and Men's Triple Jump - F46.
