= Nguyễn Thị Hải =

Vietnamese Paralympic athlete

Personal information
- Born: 17 April 1985 (age 41) Nghe An Province, Vietnam

Sport
- Sport: Paralympic athletics
Medal record
Representing Vietnam
Asian Para Games
Gold medal – first place	2014 Incheon	Javelin throw F57
Bronze medal – third place	2018 Jakarta	Javelin throw F57

Nguyễn Thị Hải (born 17 April 1985) is a Vietnamese female Paralympic javelin and discus thrower. She won the gold medal at the 2014 Asian Para Games in the F57 classification and a bronze medal in the same classification in the 2018 Asian Para Games.
