= 2016 Asian Para Athletics Championships =

IPC Athletics Asia-Oceania Championship 2016
- Host city: Dubai
- Nations: 24
- Athletes: 230
- Dates: March 7–12
- Venues: Dubai Police Club Stadium

2016 Asian Para Athletics Championships or IPC Athletics Asia-Oceania Championship 2016 was its first kind of continental championship held at Dubai Police Club Stadium, Dubai, UAE from March 7 to March 12. Iran emerged as overall champions with winning 23 Gold, 10 Silver and 7 Bronze while China and India finished 2nd and 3rd respectively.

== Schedule ==
The championship was played as per the standard rules and regulations set by IPC, Many events are open to athletes with lower classification numbers, who are deemed to have a greater impairment, such as the men's discus F56, which can also be contested by F54 and F55 classification athletes.

●	Qualification/Heat	●	Final

	March						
Date →		7	8	9	10	11	12
100 m	Men	T35; T38	T53; T54	T36; T37	T11; T12; T13; T47	T34; T42; T44	
100 m	Men	T37		T11; T47			
100 m	Women		T37; T47; T54		T11; T12		
200m	Men	T34; T42; T44	T47	T13	T53; T54	T35/36/38	T11
200m	Men	T47					
200m	Women				T36; T54		T11; T12; T44/47
400 m	Men		T12	T44	T34; T36/38; T37	T20	T13; T47; T53; T54
400 m	Men				T20	T47	
400 m	Women		T12		T20/43-47		T53
800 m	Men			T20		T34	
800 m	Women		T34	T20			
1500 m	Men	T20	T54		T11	T37/38; T46	T13
1500 m	Women		T54			T11; T20	
5000 m	Men		T11				T54
5000 m	Women			T13		T53	
4 × 100 m relay	Men				T42-47		T11-13
4 × 400 m relay	Men					T53/54	
Long jump	Men	T20	T47	T42/44	T36-38	T11/12	
Long jump	Women		T20/47			T11/12	
High jump	Men						T42-47
Shot put	Men	F35/36; F55/56	F20; F37/38		F11/12; F32/33	F46; F53/54	F34; F42/44; F57
Shot put	Women		F52-55	F40/41; F44; F56/57	F36/37	F11/12; F32-34	
Discus throw	Men	F33/34	F57	F11-13	F46; F54-56	F42; F44	F37-38; F51-53
Discus throw	Women		F37/38/44		F11/12	F54-57	
Javelin throw	Men	F40/41	F42/44; F46; F53/54	F33/34		F55/56	F11-13
Javelin throw	Women	F55/56	F34	F46	F37/38; F53/54; F57		F12
Club throw	Men			F31/32/51			
Club throw	Women			F31/32/51			

== Medal table ==
- Host nation (UAE)

Rank	Nation	Gold	Silver	Bronze	Total
1	Iran (IRI)	23	10	7	40
2	China (CHN)	16	9	5	30
3	India (IND)	12	10	9	31
4	Japan (JPN)	8	6	11	25
5	United Arab Emirates (UAE)	6	9	5	20
6	Kuwait (KUW)	4	4	1	9
7	Iraq (IRQ)	4	2	0	6
8	Malaysia (MAS)	4	0	0	4
9	Indonesia (INA)	3	6	2	11
10	Thailand (THA)	2	8	6	16
11	Qatar (QAT)	2	3	5	10
12	Hong Kong (HKG)	2	3	2	7
13	Vietnam (VIE)	2	3	0	5
14	Chinese Taipei (TPE)	2	1	3	6
15	Kazakhstan (KAZ)	2	1	2	5
16	Papua New Guinea (PNG)	2	1	0	3
17	Pakistan (PAK)	1	1	0	2
18	Mongolia (MGL)	0	2	2	4
19	Macau (MAC)	0	0	1	1
Totals (19 entries)		95	79	61	235

== Participating nations ==
- Afghanistan (AFG) (3)
- Saudi Arabia (KSA) (12)
- China (CHN) (20)
- United Arab Emirates (UAE) (30)(Host)
- Fiji (FIJ) (1)
- Hong Kong (HKG) (4)
- India (IND) (20)
- Indonesia (INA) (10)
- Iran (IRI) (26)
- Iraq (IRQ) (5)
- Japan (JPN) (22)
- Kazakhstan (KAZ) (6)
- Kuwait (KUW) (6)
- Malaysia (MAS) (5)
- Mongolia (MGL) (3)
- New Zealand (NZL) (2)
- Pakistan (PAK) (3)
- Papua New Guinea (PNG) (3)
- Qatar (QAT) (8)
- Sri Lanka (SRI) (8)
- Chinese Taipei (TPE) (6)
- Thailand (THA) (20)
- Vietnam (VIE) (2)
- Macau (MAC) (5)
