= Philippines national team =

The Philippines national team may refer to any of a number of sports team representing the Philippines in international competitions. This list includes representations of the Philippines in team sports or team competitions of otherwise individual sports. It includes both defunct and active national teams.

== List of national teams ==
Sport		Men's	Women's	Mixed	Notes
Athletics (track and field)		Yes	Yes	Yes	Team events (e.g. relay) only
American football	Tackle	Yes	No	—N/a	
American football	Flag	Yes	Yes	—N/a	
Australian rules football		Yes	No	—N/a	
Badminton		Yes	Yes	Yes	
Baseball	Standard	Yes	Yes	—N/a	
Baseball	Baseball5	—N/a	—N/a	Yes	Baseball5 is a mixed-sex discipline.
Basketball	5x5	Yes	Yes	—N/a	
Basketball	3x3	Yes	Yes	—N/a	
Basketball	Wheelchair	Yes	No	—N/a	A parasport
Cricket		Yes	Yes	—N/a	
Curling		Yes	Yes	Yes (Doubles only)	
Dragon boat		Yes / No (IDBF)	Yes	Yes (open and mixed)	In IDBF events: open category is not restricted by sex while the mixed-category requires women to be part of the team.
Esports		Yes	Yes	Yes	
Floorball		Yes	Yes	—N/a	
Football	Standard	Yes	Yes	—N/a	
Football	Futsal	Yes	Yes	—N/a	
Football	Beach soccer	Yes	No	—N/a	
Football	Cerebral palsy football	Yes	No	—N/a	A parasport
Goalball		Yes	No	—N/a	
Gymnastics	Artistic	Yes	Yes	—N/a	Team all-around only; excludes individual competition. The Philippines has competed in team all-around at the SEA Games.
Handball	Indoor	Yes	Yes	—N/a	
Handball	Beach	Yes	Yes	—N/a	
Hockey	Indoor	Yes	Yes	—N/a	
Hockey	Hockey5s	Yes	Yes	—N/a	
Hockey	Ice	Yes	Yes	—N/a	
Korfball		—N/a	—N/a	Yes	Korfball is a mixed-sex sport
Lacrosse	Field	Yes	Yes	—N/a	
Lacrosse	Sixes	Yes	No	—N/a	
Netball		No	Yes	—N/a	Netball is largely a women's sports but men's netball do exist.
Polo		Yes	No	No	
Quadball		—N/a	—N/a	Yes	Formerly known as quidditch, after the fictional sport of the same name. Quadball is a mixed-gender sport. The team debuted at the IQA World Cup in 2025.
Roller derby		Yes	Yes	No	The Philippines' have competed in the Men's Roller Derby World Cup and the women's Roller Derby World Cup.
Rugby	League	Yes	Yes	—N/a	
Rugby	Union	Yes	Yes	—N/a	
Rugby	Sevens	Yes	Yes	—N/a	
Sepak takraw		Yes	Yes		
Tchoukball	Standard	Yes	Yes		
Tchoukball	Beach	Yes	Yes		
Softball	Standard	Yes	Yes	—N/a	
Softball	Slow-pitch	—N/a	—N/a	Yes	Slow-pitch is a co-ed or mixed-sex discipline.
Squash		Yes	No		
Tennis		Yes	Yes	—N/a	National team articles are specifically for the side fielded in the Davis Cup (men's) and the Billie Jean King Cup (women's).
Volleyball	Indoor	Yes	Yes	—N/a	
Volleyball	Beach	Yes	Yes	—N/a	
Volleyball	Sitting	Yes	No	—N/a	A parasport
Water polo		Yes	Yes		
Ultimate frisbee		Yes	Yes	Yes	

== Delegations in international competitions ==
Whole delegations of the Philippines in international competitions are sometimes collectively referred to as the "Philippine national team".

Multi-sports

- Philippines at the Olympics
- Philippines at the Paralympics
- Philippines at the World University Games
- Philippines at the Youth Olympics
- Philippines at the Special Olympics World Games
- Philippines at the Deaflympics
- Philippines at the Asian Games
- Philippines at the Asian Para Games
- Philippines at the SEA Games
- Philippines at the ASEAN Para Games

Single sport

- Philippines at the World Athletics Championships
- Philippines at the World Artistic Gymnastics Championships

== See also ==
- Philippine Olympic Committee
- Paralympic Committee of the Philippines
