= Powerlifting at the 2023 ASEAN Para Games =

- Venue: National Paralympic Committee Hall, Phnom Penh
- Date: 4–7 June 2023

Powerlifting at the 2023 ASEAN Para Games was held at National Paralympic Committee Hall in Phnom Penh, Cambodia from 4–7 June 2023.

== Medal tally ==
* Host nation (Cambodia)

Rank	Nation	Gold	Silver	Bronze	Total
1	Indonesia (INA)	17	8	6	31
2	Vietnam (VIE)	10	6	6	22
3	Thailand (THA)	6	9	6	21
4	Malaysia (MAS)	2	6	2	10
5	Cambodia (CAM)*	2	0	2	4
6	Philippines (PHI)	1	3	2	6
7	Myanmar (MYA)	0	3	2	5
8	Laos (LAO)	0	1	1	2
9	Singapore (SGP)	0	0	2	2
10	Timor-Leste (TLS)	0	0	1	1
Totals (10 entries)		38	36	30	104

== Medalists ==
=== Men ===
Class	Event	Gold		Silver		Bronze	
49 kg	Best lift	Lê Văn Công; Vietnam	168 kg	Abdul Hadi; Indonesia	166 kg	Nur Irmansyah; Indonesia	125 kg
49 kg	Total lift	Lê Văn Công; Vietnam	496 kg	Abdul Hadi; Indonesia	489 kg	Nur Irmansyah; Indonesia	362 kg
54 kg	Best lift	Nguyễn Bình An; Vietnam	145 kg	Huỳnh Ngọc Phụng; Vietnam	133 kg	Thanakrit Makkinthorn; Thailand	119 kg
54 kg	Total lift	Nguyễn Bình An; Vietnam	429 kg	Huỳnh Ngọc Phụng; Vietnam	392 kg	Thanakrit Makkinthorn; Thailand	236 kg
59 kg	Best lift	Amorntep Pongsao; Thailand	156 kg	Azlan Mos; Malaysia	155 kg	Nguyễn Văn Phúc; Vietnam	135 kg
59 kg	Total lift	Amorntep Pongsao; Thailand	456 kg	Azlan Mos; Malaysia	453 kg	Nguyễn Văn Phúc; Vietnam	395 kg
65 kg	Best lift	Margono; Indonesia	161 kg	Narong Kasanun; Thailand	157 kg	Nguyễn Bé Hậu; Vietnam	140 kg
65 kg	Total lift	Margono; Indonesia	467 kg	Nguyễn Bé Hậu; Vietnam	398 kg	Silverio Martins Soares; Timor-Leste	390 kg
72 kg	Best lift	Nguyễn Văn Hùng; Vietnam	155 kg	Phutachat Panomkhet; Thailand	132 kg	Win San Aung; Myanmar	115 kg
72 kg	Total lift	Nguyễn Văn Hùng; Vietnam	458 kg	Win San Aung; Myanmar	330 kg	Phutachat Panomkhet; Thailand	262 kg
80 kg	Best lift	Thongsa Marasri; Thailand	184 kg	Bryan Junency Gustin; Malaysia	183 kg	Tambi Sibarani; Indonesia	172 kg
80 kg	Total lift	Thongsa Marasri; Thailand	535 kg	Bryan Junency Gustin; Malaysia	530 kg	Min Zaw Win; Myanmar	360 kg
88 kg	Best lift	Nicodemus Manggoi Moses; Malaysia	205 kg	Andika Eka Jaya; Indonesia	176 kg	Chinnaphop Khamdam; Thailand	170 kg
88 kg	Total lift	Nicodemus Manggoi Moses; Malaysia	595 kg	Chinnaphop Khamdam; Thailand	343 kg	Andika Eka Jaya; Indonesia	176 kg
97 kg	Best lift	Atmaji Priambodo; Indonesia	187 kg	Wan Nur Azri Wan Azman; Malaysia	175 kg	Ton Yarnpairot; Thailand	156 kg
97 kg	Total lift	Atmaji Priambodo; Indonesia	552 kg	Ton Yarnpairot; Thailand	461 kg	Wan Nur Azri Wan Azman; Malaysia	345 kg
107 kg	Best lift	Sela Kong; Cambodia	55 kg	not awarded		not awarded	
107 kg	Total lift	Sela Kong; Cambodia	158 kg	not awarded		not awarded	

=== Women ===
Class	Event	Gold		Silver		Bronze	
41 kg	Best lift	Eneng Paridah; Indonesia	75 kg	Marydol Jatayna Pamati-an; Philippines	75 kg	Latsami Sipaseuth; Laos	74 kg
41 kg	Total lift	Marydol Jatayna Pamati-an; Philippines	216 kg	Latsami Sipaseuth; Laos	216 kg	Eneng Paridah; Indonesia	146 kg
45 kg	Best lift	Ni Nengah Widiasih; Indonesia	99 kg	Achelle Guion; Philippines	79 kg	not awarded	
45 kg	Total lift	Ni Nengah Widiasih; Indonesia	293 kg	Achelle Guion; Philippines	224 kg	not awarded	
50 kg	Best lift	Đặng Thị Linh Phượng; Vietnam	95 kg	Kamolpan Kraratpet; Thailand	90 kg	Nur'aini binte Mohamad Yasli; Singapore	80 kg
50 kg	Total lift	Đặng Thị Linh Phượng; Vietnam	279 kg	Kamolpan Kraratpet; Thailand	175 kg	Nur'aini binte Mohamad Yasli; Singapore	155 kg
55 kg	Best lift	Châu Hoàng Tuyết Loan; Vietnam	98 kg	Hat Motnok; Thailand	80 kg	not awarded	
55 kg	Total lift	Châu Hoàng Tuyết Loan; Vietnam	284 kg	Hat Motnok; Thailand	158 kg	not awarded	
61 kg	Best lift	Rani Puji Astuti; Indonesia	100 kg	Somkhoun Anon; Thailand	87 kg	Nguyễn Thị Thanh Thúy; Vietnam	86 kg
61 kg	Total lift	Rani Puji Astuti; Indonesia	285 kg	Nguyễn Thị Thanh Thúy; Vietnam	169 kg	Somkhoun Anon; Thailand	87 kg
67 kg	Best lift	Shebrioni; Indonesia	105 kg	Bibiana Ahmad; Malaysia	94 kg	Trần Thị Châu; Vietnam	93 kg
67 kg	Total lift	Shebrioni; Indonesia	308 kg	Trần Thị Châu; Vietnam	252 kg	Bibiana Ahmad; Malaysia	184 kg
73 kg	Best lift	Arawan Bootpo; Thailand	107 kg	Nurtani Purba; Indonesia	106 kg	Trần Thị Tâm; Vietnam	96 kg
73 kg	Total lift	Arawan Bootpo; Thailand	315 kg	Trần Thị Tâm; Vietnam	273 kg	Nurtani Purba; Indonesia	206 kg
79 kg	Best lift	Siti Mahmudah; Indonesia	103 kg	Dwiska Afrilia Maharani; Indonesia	84 kg	Lun Chreng; Cambodia	60 kg
79 kg	Total lift	Siti Mahmudah; Indonesia	298 kg	Dwiska Afrilia Maharani; Indonesia	242 kg	Lun Chreng; Cambodia	116 kg
86 kg	Best lift	Ni Nengah Widiasih; Indonesia	86 kg	Nyein Sandar Aung; Myanmar	78 kg	not awarded	
86 kg	Total lift	Ni Nengah Widiasih; Indonesia	248 kg	Nyein Sandar Aung; Myanmar	153 kg	not awarded	
+86 kg	Best lift	Sriyanti; Indonesia	115 kg	Elsa Dewi Saputri; Indonesia	106 kg	Adeline Dumapong-Ancheta; Philippines	105 kg
+86 kg	Total lift	Sriyanti; Indonesia	338 kg	Elsa Dewi Saputri; Indonesia	294 kg	Adeline Dumapong-Ancheta; Philippines	285 kg
