= Swimming at the 2023 ASEAN Para Games =

- Venue: Morodok Techo National Sports Complex Aquatics Center
- Location: Phnom Penh, Cambodia
- Date: 4–8 June 2023

Swimming at the 2023 ASEAN Para Games was held at Morodok Techo National Sports Complex Aquatics Center in Phnom Penh, Cambodia from 4–8 June 2023.

== Medal tally ==
* Host nation (Cambodia)

Rank	Nation	Gold	Silver	Bronze	Total
1	Thailand (THA)	34	29	33	96
2	Vietnam (VIE)	28	19	26	73
3	Indonesia (INA)	27	37	24	88
4	Malaysia (MAS)	26	12	10	48
5	Singapore (SGP)	11	10	8	29
6	Philippines (PHI)	10	9	7	26
7	Myanmar (MYA)	3	6	4	13
8	Cambodia (CAM)*	0	1	2	3
Totals (8 entries)		139	123	114	376

== Medalists ==
=== Men ===
Event	Class	Gold	Silver	Bronze
50 m freestyle	S3	Phuvanart Namnoi; Thailand	Charkorn Kaewsri; Thailand	none awarded
50 m backstroke	S3	Charkorn Kaewsri; Thailand	none awarded	none awarded
100 m freestyle	S3	Charkorn Kaewsri; Thailand	none awarded	none awarded
50 m freestyle	S4	Danh Hoà; Vietnam	Nguyễn Mạnh Phú; Vietnam	Marco Quejano Tinamisan; Philippines
50 m backstroke	S4	Nguyễn Thành Trung; Vietnam	Nguyễn Mạnh Phú; Vietnam	Danh Hoà; Vietnam
50 m backstroke	SB3	Danh Hoà; Vietnam	Hà Văn Hiệp; Vietnam	Phuvanart Namnoi; Thailand
100 m freestyle	S4	Danh Hoà; Vietnam	Marco Quejano Tinamisan; Philippines	Simson Abraham Situmorang; Indonesia
100 m freestyle	S4	Danh Hoà; Vietnam	Marco Quejano Tinamisan; Philippines	Simson Abraham Situmorang; Indonesia
200 m freestyle	S4	Danh Hoà; Vietnam	No Zin; Myanmar	Simson Abraham Situmorang; Indonesia
50 m freestyle	S5	Muhammad Nur Syaiful Zulkafli; Malaysia	Januari; Indonesia	Võ Thanh Tùng; Vietnam
50 m backstroke	S5	Võ Thanh Tùng; Vietnam	Eakapan Songwichean; Thailand	Kyaw Htoo; Myanmar
50 m butterfly	S5	Võ Thanh Tùng; Vietnam	Kyaw Htoo; Myanmar	Natthaphong Wiprajong; Thailand
50 m breaststroke	SB4	Muhammad Nur Syaiful Zulkafli; Malaysia	Fajar Nur Hadianto; Indonesia	Simson Abraham Situmorang; Indonesia
100 m freestyle	S5	Muhammad Nur Syaiful Zulkafli; Malaysia	Januari; Indonesia	Phuchit Aingchaiyaphum; Thailand
100 m backstroke	S5	Eakapan Songwichean; Thailand	Phuchit Aingchaiyaphum; Thailand	Võ Thanh Tùng; Vietnam
100 m breaststroke	SB4	Fajar Nur Hadianto; Indonesia	Simson Abraham Situmorang; Indonesia	Muhammad Nur Syaiful Zulkafli; Malaysia
200 m freestyle	S5	Zy Kher Lee; Malaysia	Phuchit Aingchaiyaphum; Thailand	Muhammad Nur Syaiful Zulkafli; Malaysia
200 m individual medley	SM5	Zy Kher Lee; Malaysia	Mulyadi; Indonesia	Võ Thanh Tùng; Vietnam
50 m freestyle	S6	Lê Tiến Đạt; Vietnam	Gary Bejino; Philippines	Aekkarin Noithat; Thailand
50 m butterfly	S6	Aekkarin Noithat; Thailand	Gary Bejino; Philippines	Boonyarit Payungsakul; Thailand
50 m breaststroke	SB5	Đỗ Thanh Hải; Vietnam	Lê Tiến Đạt; Vietnam	Mulyadi; Indonesia
100 m freestyle	S6	Aung Myint Myat; Myanmar	Gary Bejino; Philippines	Channi Wongnonthaphum; Thailand
100 m backstroke	S6	Aung Myint Myat; Myanmar	Aekkarin Noithat; Thailand	Channi Wongnonthaphum; Thailand
100 m breaststroke	SB5	Lê Tiến Đạt; Vietnam	Đỗ Thanh Hải; Vietnam	Mulyadi; Indonesia
200 m freestyle	S6	Gary Bejino; Philippines	Channi Wongnonthaphum; Thailand	Đỗ Thanh Hải; Vietnam
400 m freestyle	S6	Gary Bejino; Philippines	Aung Myint Myat; Myanmar	Đỗ Thanh Hải; Vietnam
200 m individual medley	SM6	Aekkarin Noithat; Thailand	Aung Myint Myat; Myanmar	Đỗ Thanh Hải; Vietnam
50 m freestyle	S7	Toh Wei Soong; Singapore	Nguyễn Hoàng Nhã; Vietnam	Hán Quang Thoại; Vietnam
50 m butterfly	S7	Toh Wei Soong; Singapore	Ernie Gawilan; Philippines	Nguyễn Hoàng Nhã; Vietnam
100 m freestyle	S7	Toh Wei Soong; Singapore	Ernie Gawilan; Philippines	Hán Quang Thoại; Vietnam
100 m backstroke	S7	Nguyễn Hoàng Nhã; Vietnam	Toh Wei Soong; Singapore	Ernie Gawilan; Philippines
100 m breaststroke	SB6	Muhammad Gerry Pahker; Indonesia	Nanda Soe Min; Myanmar	Yungyoot Tabthong; Thailand
400 m freestyle	S7	Ernie Gawilan; Philippines	Toh Wei Soong; Singapore	Hán Quang Thoại; Vietnam
200 m individual medley	SM7	Ernie Gawilan; Philippines	Nguyễn Hoàng Nhã; Vietnam	Hán Quang Thoại; Vietnam
50 m freestyle	S8	Abdul Halim Mohammad; Malaysia	Phạm Thành Đạt; Vietnam	Patchara Singhmanon; Thailand
50 m butterfly	S8	Phạm Thành Đạt; Vietnam	Rusdianto Rusmadi; Malaysia	Võ Huỳnh Anh Khoa; Vietnam
50 m breaststroke	SB7	Min Htoo; Myanmar	Khuoy Koy; Cambodia	Aris Wibawa; Indonesia
100 m freestyle	S8	Abdul Halim Mohammad; Malaysia	Patchara Singhmanon; Thailand	Phạm Thành Đạt; Vietnam
100 m backstroke	S8	Võ Huỳnh Anh Khoa; Vietnam	Rusdianto Rusmadi; Malaysia	Patchara Singhmanon; Thailand
100 m butterfly	S8	Rusdianto Rusmadi; Malaysia	Guntur; Indonesia	Võ Huỳnh Anh Khoa; Vietnam
100 m breaststroke	SB7	Aris Wibawa; Indonesia	Min Htoo; Myanmar	Khuoy Koy; Cambodia
400m freestyle	S8	Võ Huỳnh Anh Khoa; Vietnam	Rusdianto Rusmadi; Malaysia	Đặng Văn Công; Vietnam
200 m individual medley	SM8	Abdul Halim Mohammad; Malaysia	Rusdianto Rusmadi; Malaysia	Võ Huỳnh Anh Khoa; Vietnam
50 m freestyle	S9	Zaki Zulkarnain; Indonesia	Rino Saputra; Indonesia	Nantawat Ropkob; Thailand
50 m butterfly	S9	Zaki Zulkarnain; Indonesia	Nantawat Ropkob; Thailand	Kaung Myat Kyaw; Myanmar
50 m breaststroke	SB8	Abdul Halim Mohammad; Malaysia	Nguyễn Quang Vương; Vietnam	Guntur; Indonesia
100 m freestyle	S9	Jendi Pangabean; Indonesia	Zaki Zulkarnain; Indonesia	Rino Saputra; Indonesia
100 m backstroke	S9	Jendi Pangabean; Indonesia	Trương Quang Gôn; Vietnam	Rino Saputra; Indonesia
100 m butterfly	S9	Jendi Pangabean; Indonesia	Nantawat Ropkob; Thailand	Nguyễn Ngọc Thiết; Vietnam
100 m breaststroke	SB8	Abdul Halim Mohammad; Malaysia	Guntur; Indonesia	Nguyễn Quang Vương; Vietnam
400 m freestyle	S9	Jendi Pangabean; Indonesia	Nantawat Ropkob; Thailand	Roland Bajo Sabido; Philippines
200 m individual medley	SM9	Jendi Pangabean; Indonesia	Zaki Zulkarnain; Indonesia	Nguyễn Ngọc Thiết; Vietnam
50 m freestyle	S10	Sampachan Samathi; Thailand	Bayu Putra Yuda; Indonesia	Vannak Yav; Cambodia
50 m backstroke	S10	Sampachan Samathi; Thailand	Steven Sualang Tangkilisan; Indonesia	Rahmad Tulloh; Indonesia
50 m butterfly	S10	Sampachan Samathi; Thailand	Bayu Putra Yuda; Indonesia	Fraidden Dawan; Malaysia
100 m freestyle	S10	Sampachan Samathi; Thailand	Bayu Putra Yuda; Indonesia	Soe Win; Myanmar
100 m backstroke	S10	Steven Sualang Tangkilisan; Indonesia	Fraidden Dawan; Malaysia	Priwan Hadee; Thailand
100 m butterfly	S10	Fraidden Dawan; Malaysia	Steven Sualang Tangkilisan; Indonesia	Phasit Phukhamkhom; Thailand
100 m breaststroke	SB9	Zaki Zulkarnain; Indonesia	Bayu Putra Yuda; Indonesia	Muhaimin Tantoy Ulag; Philippines
400 m freestyle	S10	Fraidden Dawan; Malaysia	Steven Sualang Tangkilisan; Indonesia	Soe Win; Myanmar
200 m individual medley	SM10	Fraidden Dawan; Malaysia	Bayu Putra Yuda; Indonesia	Sampachan Samathi; Thailand
50 m freestyle	S11	Thanongsak Hitakun; Thailand	Sukrid Mueanpong; Thailand	Chom Sonsamrong; Thailand
100 m freestyle	S11	Thanongsak Hitakun; Thailand	Chom Sonsamrong; Thailand	Adisorn Chokniramit; Thailand
100 m backstroke	S11	Thanongsak Hitakun; Thailand	Adisorn Chokniramit; Thailand	Chom Sonsamrong; Thailand
100 m butterfly	S11	Adisorn Chokniramit; Thailand	Nguyễn Văn Tùng; Vietnam	Kritaphat Witidkasemrot; Thailand
100 m breaststroke	SB11	Nguyễn Văn Hạnh; Vietnam	Kritaphat Witidkasemrot; Thailand	Sukrid Mueanpong; Thailand
400 m freestyle	S11	Adisorn Chokniramit; Thailand	Chom Sonsamrong; Thailand	Thanongsak Hitakun; Thailand
50 m freestyle	S12	Maulana Rifky Yavianda; Indonesia	Anan Withetsuksom; Thailand	Menaser Meriba Numberi; Indonesia
50 m breaststroke	SB12	Maulana Rifky Yavianda; Indonesia	Anan Withetsuksom; Thailand	not awarded
100 m freestyle	S12	Maulana Rifky Yavianda; Indonesia	Anan Withetsuksom; Thailand	not awarded
100 m butterfly	S12	Maulana Rifky Yavianda; Indonesia	not awarded	not awarded
100 m breaststroke	SB12	Anan Withetsuksom; Thailand	not awarded	not awarded
50 m freestyle	S13	Colin Soon Jin Guang; Singapore	Marinus Melianus Yowei; Indonesia	Wong Zhi Wei; Singapore
50 m breaststroke	SB13	Colin Soon Jin Guang; Singapore	Wong Zhi Wei; Singapore	Marinus Melianus Yowei; Indonesia
100 m backstroke	S13	Maulana Rifky Yavianda; Indonesia	Colin Soon Jin Guang; Singapore	Menaser Meriba Numberi; Indonesia
100 m butterfly	S13	Wong Zhi Wei; Singapore	Marinus Melianus Yowei; Indonesia	Nguyễn Đức Hậu; Vietnam
100 m breaststroke	SB13	Colin Soon Jin Guang; Singapore	Marinus Melianus Yowei; Indonesia	Wong Zhi Wei; Singapore
50 m freestyle	S14	Bryan Lau Sze Kai; Malaysia	Ariel Joseph Alegarbes; Philippines	Ethan Khoo Yin Jun; Malaysia
50 m backstroke	S14	Muhammad Imaan Aiman; Malaysia	Duran Yaspi Imam Basori; Malaysia	Fathur Rizky Moreno; Indonesia
50 m butterfly	S14	Ariel Joseph Alegarbes; Philippines	Bryan Lau Sze Kai; Malaysia	Muhammad Imaan Aiman; Malaysia
50 m breaststroke	SB14	Mohammad Adib Iqbal Abdullah; Malaysia	Darren Chan Wei Siang; Singapore	Parami Chaysri; Thailand
100 m freestyle	S14	Bryan Lau Sze Kai; Malaysia	Ethan Khoo Yin Jun; Malaysia	Wachirawit In-choo; Thailand
100 m backstroke	S14	Muhammad Imaan Aiman; Malaysia	Ethan Khoo Yin Jun; Malaysia	Duran Yaspi Imam Basori; Malaysia
100 m butterfly	S14	Muhammad Imaan Aiman; Malaysia	Ariel Joseph Alegarbes; Philippines	Bryan Lau Sze Kai; Malaysia
100 m breaststroke	SB14	Mohammad Adib Iqbal Abdullah; Malaysia	Ariel Joseph Alegarbes; Philippines	Darren Chan Wei Siang; Singapore
200 m freestyle	S14	Ethan Khoo Yin Jun; Malaysia	Bryan Lau Sze Kai; Malaysia	Wachirawit In-choo; Thailand
200 m individual medley	SM14	Ariel Joseph Alegarbes; Philippines	Muhammad Imaan Aiman; Malaysia	Ethan Khoo Yin Jun; Malaysia
4 × 100 m medley relay	SM14	Malaysia (MAS); Bryan Lau Sze Kai; Ethan Khoo Yin Jun; Mohammad Adib Iqbal Abdullah; Muhammad Imaan Aiman	not awarded	not awarded
4×50 m freestyle relay	20 points	Vietnam (VIE); Danh Hòa; Đỗ Thanh Hải; Lê Tiến Đạt; Nguyễn Thành Trung	Thailand (THA); Aekkarin Noithat; Channi Wongnonthaphum; Charkorn Kaewsri; Phuchit Aingchaiyaphum	Philippines (PHI)
4×50 m medley relay	20 points	Vietnam (VIE); Danh Hòa; Đỗ Thanh Hải; Lê Tiến Đạt; Nguyễn Thành Trung	Indonesia (INA); Fajar Nur Hadianto; Januari; Muhamamd Gerry Pahker; Mulyadi	not awarded
4 × 100 m freestyle relay	34 points	Vietnam (VIE); Nguyễn Hoàng Nhã; Nguyễn Ngọc Thiết; Quách Văn Vinh; Võ Huỳnh Anh Khoa	Thailand (THA); Kaweewat Sittichaiphonniti; Nantawat Ropkob; Patchara Singhmanon; Sampachan Samathi	Indonesia (INA); Jendi Pangabean; Rino Saputra; Suriansyah; Zaki Zulkarnain
4 × 100 m medley relay	34 points	Indonesia (INA); Jendi Pangabean; Muhamamd Gerry Pahker; Steven Sualang Tangkilisan; Zaki Zulkarnain	Vietnam (VIE); Nguyễn Ngọc Thiết; Nguyễn Quang Vương; Trương Quang Gôn; Võ Huỳnh Anh Khoa	Malaysia (MAS); Abdul Halim Mohammad; Fraidden Dawan; Jaflee Jikol; Muhammad Nur Syaiful Zulkafli
4 × 100 m freestyle relay	49 points	Indonesia (INA); Marinus Melianus Yowei; Maulana Rifky Yavianda; Menaser Meriba Numberi; Sunarto	not awarded	not awarded
4 × 100 m medley relay	49 points	Indonesia (INA); Fajar Trihadi; Marinus Melianus Yowei; Maulana Rifky Yavianda; Menaser Meriba Numberi	not awarded	not awarded

=== Women ===
Event	Class	Gold	Silver	Bronze
50 m freestyle	S5	Angel Otom; Philippines	Wilasini Wongnonthapoom; Thailand	Nguyễn Thị Sari; Vietnam
50 m backstroke	S5	Angel Otom; Philippines	Wilasini Wongnonthapoom; Thailand	Danh Thị Mỹ Thánh; Vietnam
50 m butterfly	S5	Angel Otom; Philippines	Nguyễn Thị Sari; Vietnam	not awarded
100 m freestyle	S5	Wilasini Wongnonthapoom; Thailand	not awarded	not awarded
200 m freestyle	S5	Wilasini Wongnonthapoom; Thailand	not awarded	not awarded
100 m breaststroke	SB4	Nguyễn Thị Sari; Vietnam	Brenda Anellia Larry; Malaysia	Wilasini Wongnonthapoom; Thailand
200 m individual medley	SM5	Angel Otom; Philippines	Nguyễn Thị Sari; Vietnam	not awarded
50 m freestyle	S6	Trịnh Thị Bích Như; Vietnam	Siti Alfiah; Indonesia	Riyanti; Indonesia
50 m butterfly	S6	Trịnh Thị Bích Như; Vietnam	Siti Alfiah; Indonesia	Riyanti; Indonesia
100 m freestyle	S6	Trịnh Thị Bích Như; Vietnam	Siti Alfiah; Indonesia	Riyanti; Indonesia
100 m breaststroke	SB5	Trịnh Thị Bích Như; Vietnam	not awarded	not awarded
400 m freestyle	S6	Riyanti; Indonesia	Saudah; Indonesia	Bearice Maria Fulache Roble; Philippines
200 m individual medley	SM6	Trịnh Thị Bích Như; Vietnam	Siti Alfiah; Indonesia	Riyanti; Indonesia
50 m freestyle	S7	Vi Thị Hằng; Vietnam	not awarded	not awarded
100 m freestyle	S7-8	Vi Thị Hằng; Vietnam	Lê Thị Dung; Vietnam	Carmen Lim; Malaysia
100 m breaststroke	SB6	Vi Thị Hằng; Vietnam	Siti Alfiah; Indonesia	Riyanti; Indonesia
400 m freestyle	S7	Vi Thị Hằng; Vietnam	not awarded	not awarded
50 m freestyle	S8	Carmen Lim; Malaysia	not awarded	not awarded
50 m freestyle	S9	Anchaya Ketkeaw; Thailand	Surerut Komkeaw; Thailand	Prakaithip Chaiwong; Thailand
50 m breaststroke	SB8	Carmen Lim; Malaysia	Prakaithip Chaiwong; Thailand	Hoàng Thị Mỹ Lệ; Vietnam
100 m freestyle	S9	Anchaya Ketkeaw; Thailand	Surerut Komkeaw; Thailand	Prakaithip Chaiwong; Thailand
100 m backstroke	S9	Anchaya Ketkeaw; Thailand	Mutiara Cantik Harsanto; Indonesia	Prakaithip Chaiwong; Thailand
100 m butterfly	S9	Anchaya Ketkeaw; Thailand	Mutiara Cantik Harsanto; Indonesia	Surerut Komkeaw; Thailand
100 m breaststroke	SB8	Carmen Lim; Malaysia	Prakaithip Chaiwong; Thailand	Hoàng Thị Mỹ Lệ; Vietnam
400 m freestyle	S9	Mutiara Cantik Harsanto; Indonesia	Surerut Komkeaw; Thailand	Ina Prihati Nur Islami; Indonesia
200 m individual medley	SM9	Anchaya Ketkeaw; Thailand	Mutiara Cantik Harsanto; Indonesia	Surerut Komkeaw; Thailand
50 m freestyle	S10	Monruedee Kangpila; Thailand	Hồ Thị Loan; Vietnam	Janelle Tong Jing Xuan; Singapore
100 m freestyle	S10	Monruedee Kangpila; Thailand	Hồ Thị Loan; Vietnam	Janelle Tong Jing Xuan; Singapore
100 m breaststroke	SB9	Mutiara Cantik Harsanto; Indonesia	Monruedee Kangpila; Thailand	Ummu Khalsum; Indonesia
400 m freestyle	S10	Monruedee Kangpila; Thailand	Janelle Tong Jing Xuan; Singapore	Hồ Thị Loan; Vietnam
200 m individual medley	SM10	Monruedee Kangpila; Thailand	Hồ Thị Loan; Vietnam	Janelle Tong Jing Xuan; Singapore
50 m freestyle	S13	Sophie Soon Jing Wen; Singapore	not awarded	not awarded
100 m butterfly	S13	Sophie Soon Jing Wen; Singapore	not awarded	not awarded
100 m breaststroke	SB12-13	Sophie Soon Jing Wen; Singapore	not awarded	not awarded
50 m freestyle	S14	Nattharinee Khajhonmatha; Thailand	Syuci Indriani; Indonesia	Danielle Moi Yan Ting; Singapore
50 m backstroke	S14	Meliana Ratih Pratama; Indonesia	Danielle Moi Yan Ting; Singapore	Luksika Uttisen; Thailand
50 m butterfly	S14	Syuci Indriani; Indonesia	Danielle Moi Yan Ting; Singapore	Luksika Uttisen; Thailand
100 m freestyle	S14	Nattharinee Khajhonmatha; Thailand	Syuci Indriani; Indonesia	Meliana Ratih Pratama; Indonesia
100 m backstroke	S14	Nattharinee Khajhonmatha; Thailand	Meliana Ratih Pratama; Indonesia	Panita Hasamoah; Thailand
100 m butterfly	S14	Syuci Indriani; Indonesia	Danielle Moi Yan Ting; Singapore	Luksika Uttisen; Thailand
200 m freestyle	S14	Nattharinee Khajhonmatha; Thailand	Meliana Ratih Pratama; Indonesia	Claire Suñega Calizo; Philippines
200 m individual medley	SM14	Nattharinee Khajhonmatha; Thailand	Syuci Indriani; Indonesia	Danielle Moi Yan Ting; Singapore
4 × 100 m freestyle relay	34 points	Thailand (THA); Anchaya Ketkeaw; Monruedee Kangpila; Surerut Komkeaw; Wilasini Wongnonthapoom	Vietnam (VIE); Hồ Thị Loan; Lê Thị Dung; Trịnh Thị Bích Như; Vi Thị Hằng	not awarded
4 × 100 m medley relay	34 points	Thailand (THA); Anchaya Ketkeaw; Monruedee Kangpila; Surerut Komkeaw; Wilasini Wongnonthapoom	Indonesia (INA); Ina Prihati Nur Islami; Mutiara Cantik Harsanto; Tiara Hanum Kembang Joyo; Ummu Kalsum	not awarded

=== Mixed ===
Event	Class	Gold	Silver	Bronze
4 × 100 m freestyle relay	S14	Indonesia (INA); Fathur Rizky Moreno; Muhammad Tauhidi Fatahillah; Meliana Ratih Pratama; Syuci Indriani	not awarded	not awarded
