= Philippines national cerebral palsy football team =

- Federation: Paralympic Committee of the Philippines
- Head coach: Alfredo Estacion
- IFCPF ranking: 33

The Philippines national cerebral palsy football team is the representative side which represents the Philippines in international cerebral palsy football competitions.

== History ==
The first Philippine national cerebral palsy (CP) football team was organized in 2019, by the non-profit organization Henry V. Moran Foundation with CP Football Philippines, the foundation's "special football arm". The foundation was tasked to organize the national team by the Paralympic Committee of the Philippines which was supposed to represent the Philippines at the 2020 ASEAN Para Games. By July 2019, some players for the national team were already scouted and is already training after the CP Football Philippines conducted numerous try-outs and clinics in 12 cities across the country. The national team nicknamed "CP Rascals" has received sponsorship and support from various private firms such as Globe Telecom and Allianz PNB Life. However the games were later cancelled due to the COVID-19 pandemic.

The Philippines intended to participate at the 2021 ASEAN Para Games originally scheduled to be hosted in Vietnam. They ultimately did not take part in the rescheduled games held in Indonesia. They entered the 2023 ASEAN Para Games in Cambodia, where the finished last among six teams.

They also plan to make their CP football debut at the 2022 Asian Para Games. They ultimately did not enter.

== Results and fixtures ==
The following is a list of match results in the last 12 months, as well as any future matches that have been scheduled.

Win Draw Loss Fixture

=== 2026 ===
January 19 2025 ASEAN Para Games	Philippines	0–19	Thailand	Nakhon Ratchasima, Thailand
18:00 UTC+7		Report	Sittisuwankul 2', 12', 15', 34', 50'; Nampaksa 5', 28', 32', 41'; Nuepho 8', 10', 22'; Saechao 25'; Deeman 57'; Thammawichai 58', 64'; Kaisakaew 59', 60', 60+3'	Stadium: Nakhon Ratchasima Rajabhat University; Referee: Yang Shu Ting (Chinese Taipei)

January 21 2025 ASEAN Para Games	Indonesia	15–1	Philippines	Nakhon Ratchasima, Thailand
19:00 UTC+7	Tabrani 1', 25', 26', 28'; Khanani 4', 23'; Hendrawan 7'; Suseno 21', 30+1'; Sejati 35', 54', 58'; Mahdianurn 50'; Wicaksono 55'; Mulyana 55'	Report	Dacera 49'	Stadium: Nakhon Ratchasima Rajabhat University; Referee: Putthipong Issising (Thailand)

January 23 2025 ASEAN Para Games	Philippines	0–22	Myanmar	Nakhon Ratchasima, Thailand
15:00 UTC+7		Report	Zaw Nyi Nyi Maungi 1', 2', 3', 5', 6', 10', 19', 21', 31', 33'; Zin Thet 8'; Kaung Kyaw Khant 11', 14'; Hein Htet San 24', 37', 40', 42'; Wai Yan Min Tun 48', 49', 60'; Hein Htet Aung 55'; Kaung Myat Naing 59'	Stadium: Nakhon Ratchasima Rajabhat University; Referee: Panya Nawasimainam (Thailand)

January 24 2025 ASEAN Para Games	Malaysia	23–0	Philippines	Nakhon Ratchasima, Thailand
15:00 UTC+7	Mohammed Kassim 2', 21', 22', 30+2'; Abu Bakar 4', 10', 11', 27', 30+3', 44', 52', 53', 55', 58'; Thaker Singh 8', 22', 28'; Abd Samat 24'; Jasnal 31', 37', 38'; Ismail 42'; Mahzan 57'	Report		Stadium: Nakhon Ratchasima Rajabhat University; Referee: Deliana Iman (Indonesia)

== Competitive record ==
=== ASEAN Para Games ===
Champions Runners-up Third place

ASEAN Para Games record
Year	Host	Round	Pld	W	D	L	GF	GA
2014	Myanmar	Did not exist						
2015	Singapore	Did not exist						
2017	Malaysia	Did not exist						
2022	Indonesia	Did not enter						
2023	Cambodia	Group stage	2	0	0	3	6	29
2025	Thailand	Group stage	4	0	0	4	1	79
Total	2/6	Group stage	6	0	0	7	7	108
