= Malaysia at the 2023 ASEAN Para Games =

- IPC code: MAS
- NPC: Paralympic Council of Malaysia
- Website: www.paralympic.org.my (in English)

in Phnom Penh, Cambodia
- Competitors: 144 in 13 sports and 153 events
- Flag bearers: Angeline Melissa Lawas (boccia)
- Officials: 84
- Medals Ranked 4th: Gold 50 Silver 38 Bronze 34 Total 122

ASEAN Para Games appearances (overview)
- 2001; 2003; 2005; 2008; 2009; 2011; 2014; 2015; 2017; 2022; 2023

Malaysia competed at the 2023 ASEAN Para Games in Phnom Penh, Cambodia from 3 to 9 June 2023. The Malaysian contingent consisted of 144 athletes, 116 being men and 28 women. The contingent also included 84 officials. Noor Syahieda Mat Shah is the delegation's chef de mission.

Overall, Malaysia won 50 golds more than the previous target of 33 golds.

== Medal summary ==
=== Medal by sport ===
Medals by sport
Sport	1st place, gold medalist(s)	2nd place, silver medalist(s)	3rd place, bronze medalist(s)	Total	Rank
Athletics	14	15	10	39	(4)
Badminton	3	1	6	10	(3)
Blind football	0	1	0	1	(2)
Boccia	1	0	1	2	(3)
Football 7-a-side	1	0	0	1	(1)
Goalball	0	0	1	1	(4)
Judo	1	0	1	2	(3)
Powerlifting	2	6	2	10	(4)
Swimming	26	12	10	48	(4)
Table tennis	2	3	1	6	(3)
Wheelchair basketball	0	0	2	2	(5)
Total	50	38	34	122	(4)

=== Medal by gender ===
Medals by gender
Gender	1st place, gold medalist(s)	2nd place, silver medalist(s)	3rd place, bronze medalist(s)	Total	Percentage
Male	43	33	28	104	85.2%
Female	7	4	5	16	13.1%
Mixed	0	1	1	2	1.6%
Total	50	38	34	122	100%

=== Medal by date ===
Day	Date	1st place, gold medalist(s)	2nd place, silver medalist(s)	3rd place, bronze medalist(s)	Total
1	3 June	Opening Ceremony			
1	3 June	0	1	1	2
2	4 June	8	6	3	17
3	5 June	16	10	9	35
4	6 June	9	10	5	24
5	7 June	9	8	7	24
6	8 June	5	3	9	17
7	9 June	3	0	0	3
7	9 June	Closing Ceremony			
Total		50	38	34	122

== Medalists ==
=== Gold ===
Medal	Name	Sport	Event	Date
Gold	Fraidden Dawan	Swimming	Men's 400m freestyle S10	4 June
Gold	Mohd Adib Iqbal Abdullah	Swimming	Men's 100m breaststroke SB14	4 June
Gold	Abd Halim Mohammad	Swimming	Men's 100m breaststroke SB8	4 June
Gold	Lim Carmen	Swimming	Women's 100m breaststroke SB8	4 June
Gold	Abd Halim Mohammad	Swimming	Men's 100m freestyle S8	4 June
Gold	Muhammad Imaan Aiman Muhammad Redzuan	Swimming	Men's 50m backstroke S14	4 June
Gold	Nani Shahiera Zawawi	Athletics	Women's long jump T20	4 June
Gold	Muhammad Ashraf Muhammad Haisham	Athletics	Men's 5000m T46	4 June
Gold	Muhammad Ashraf Muhammad Haisham	Athletics	Men's 1500m T46	5 June
Gold	Eddy Bernard	Athletics	Men's 100m T44	5 June
Gold	Mohamad Aliff Mohamad Awi	Athletics	Men's shot put F20	5 June
Gold	Zy Kher Lee	Swimming	Men's 200m freestyle S5	5 June
Gold	Muhammad Nur Syaiful Zulkafli	Swimming	Men's 50m breaststroke SB4	5 June
Gold	Mohd Adib Iqbal Abdullah	Swimming	Men's 50m breaststroke SB14	5 June
Gold	Mohd Shahmil Md Saad	Athletics	Men's shot put F56	5 June
Gold	Abd Halim Mohammad	Swimming	Men's 50m breaststroke SB8	5 June
Gold	Lim Carmen	Swimming	Women's 50m breaststroke SB8	5 June
Gold	Muhammad Imaan Aiman Muhammad Redzuan	Swimming	Men's 100m backstroke S14	5 June
Gold	Bryan Lau Sze Kai; Ethan Khoo Yin Jun; Mohd Adib Iqbal Abdullah; Muhammad Imaan Aiman Muhammad Redzuan	Swimming	Men's team 4x100m medley relay S14	5 June
Gold	Mohamad Saifuddin Ishak	Athletics	Men's long jump T11-12	5 June
Gold	Muhammad Fatah Abu Bakar	Judo	Men's -73 kg	5 June
Gold	Zulkifly Abdullah	Athletics	Men's long jump T20	5 June
Gold	Eddy Bernard	Athletics	Men's long jump T42-44	5 June
Gold	Brady Zi Rong Chin; Chee Chaoming	Table tennis	Men's team TT9	5 June
Gold	Bryan Lau Sze Kai	Swimming	Men's 100m freestyle S14	6 June
Gold	Rusdianto Rusmadi	Swimming	Men's 100m butterfly S8	6 June
Gold	Doriah Poulus	Athletics	Women's shot put F44	6 June
Gold	Mohammad Zikri Zakaria	Athletics	Men's shot put F55	6 June
Gold	Fraidden Dawan	Swimming	Men's 100m butterfly S10	6 June
Gold	Muhammad Imaan Aiman Muhammad Redzuan	Swimming	Men's 100m butterfly S14	6 June
Gold	Noor Askuzaimey Mat Salim	Boccia	Women's individual BC4	6 June
Gold	Muhammad Ammar Aiman Nor Azmi	Athletics	Men's 400m T20	6 June
Gold	Brady Zi Rong Chin; Chee Chaoming	Table tennis	Men's doubles TT9	6 June
Gold	Ethan Khoo Yin Jun	Swimming	Men's 200m freestyle S14	7 June
Gold	Zy Kher Lee	Swimming	Men's 200m individual medley SM5	7 June
Gold	Nicodemus Manggoi Moses	Powerlifting	Men's up to 88 kg - best lift	7 June
Gold	Nicodemus Manggoi Moses	Powerlifting	Men's up to 88 kg - total	7 June
Gold	Abd Halim Mohammad	Swimming	Men's 200m individual medley SM8	7 June
Gold	Fraidden Dawan	Swimming	Men's 200m individual medley SM10	7 June
Gold	Muhammad Nur Syaiful Zulkafli	Swimming	Men's 50m freestyle S5	7 June
Gold	Doriah Poulus	Athletics	Women's javelin throw F44	7 June
Gold	Muhamad Nurdin Ibrahim	Athletics	Men's 5000m T20	7 June
Gold	Muhammad Nur Syaiful Zulkafli	Swimming	Men's 100m freestyle S5	8 June
Gold	Lim Carmen	Swimming	Women's 50m freestyle S8	8 June
Gold	Abd Halim Mohammad	Swimming	Men's 50m freestyle S8	8 June
Gold	Bryan Lau Sze Kai	Swimming	Men's 50m freestyle S14	8 June
Gold	Malaysia men's team	Football 7-a-side	Men's team	8 June
Gold	Muhammad Ikhwan Ramli	Badminton	Men's singles WH1	9 June
Gold	Mhd Amin Burhanuddin	Badminton	Men's singles SL4	9 June
Gold	Muhammad Ikhwan Ramli; Noor Azwan Noorlan	Badminton	Men's doubles WH1-WH2	9 June

=== Silver ===
Medal	Name	Sport	Event	Date
Silver	Mhd Amin Burhanuddin; Muhammad Zulfatihi Jaafar; Muhammad Huzairi Abdul Malek; Amyrul Yazid Ahmad Sibi; Mohamad Faris Ahmad Azri; Muhammad Fareez Anuar	Badminton	Men's team standing	3 June
Silver	Rusdianto Rusmadi	Swimming	Men's 400m freestyle S8	4 June
Silver	Noor Imanina Idris	Athletics	Women's shot put F20	4 June
Silver	Duran Yaspi Imam Basori	Swimming	Men's 50m backstroke S14	4 June
Silver	Muhammad Nazmi Nasri	Athletics	Men's long jump T37-38	4 June
Silver	Muhammad Haqeem Mustaqim Husmadi	Athletics	Men's 1500m T20	4 June
Silver	Muhammad Faiz Haizat Rosdi	Athletics	Men's 1500m T38	4 June
Silver	Rusdianto Rusmadi	Swimming	Men's 100m backstroke S8	5 June
Silver	Ethan Yin Jun Khoo	Swimming	Men's 100m backstroke S14	5 June
Silver	Bryan Sze Kai Lau	Swimming	Men's 50m butterfly S14	5 June
Silver	Ahmad Fizzi Rosni	Athletics	Men's 100m T37	5 June
Silver	Azlan Mos	Powerlifting	Men's up to 59 kg - best lift	5 June
Silver	Azlan Mos	Powerlifting	Men's up to 59 kg - total	5 June
Silver	Bibiana Ahmad	Powerlifting	Women's up to 67 kg - best lift	5 June
Silver	Muhamad Afiq Mohamad Ali Hanafiah	Athletics	Men's 100m T12	5 June
Silver	Muhammad Faiz Haizat Rosdi	Athletics	Men's 800m T38	5 June
Silver	Eljoe Gotuoh	Athletics	Men's long jump T20	5 June
Silver	Muhammad Ashraf Muhammad Haisham	Athletics	Men's 800m T46	6 June
Silver	Ethan Khoo Yin Jun	Swimming	Men's 100m freestyle S14	6 June
Silver	Fraidden Dawan	Swimming	Men's 100m backstroke S10	6 June
Silver	Bryan Junency Gustin	Powerlifting	Men's up to 80 kg - best lift	6 June
Silver	Bryan Junency Gustin	Powerlifting	Men's up to 80 kg - total	6 June
Silver	Muhammad Amirul Alif Abdul Raof	Athletics	Men's shot put F55	6 June
Silver	Muhammad Imaan Aiman Muhammad Redzuan	Swimming	Men's 200m individual medley SM14	6 June
Silver	Badrul Hisam Musa	Athletics	Men's shot put F12	6 June
Silver	Wong Kar Gee	Athletics	Men's long jump T13	6 June
Silver	Chee Chaoming; Gloria Gracia Wong Sze	Table tennis	Mixed doubles TT10	6 June
Silver	Bryan Lau Sze Kai	Swimming	Men's 200m freestyle S14	7 June
Silver	Rusdianto Rusmadi	Swimming	Men's 50m butterfly S8	7 June
Silver	Brenda Anellia Larry	Swimming	Women's 100m breaststroke SB4	7 June
Silver	Heronlee Wong	Athletics	Men's javelin throw F37	7 June
Silver	Wan Nur Azri Wan Azman	Powerlifting	Men's up to 97 kg - best lift	7 June
Silver	Rusdianto Rusmadi	Swimming	Men's 200m individual medley SM8	7 June
Silver	Muhamad Afiq Mohamad Ali Hanafiah	Athletics	Men's 200m T12	7 June
Silver	Ahmad Fizzi Rosni	Athletics	Men's 200m T36-37	7 June
Silver	Jennathul Fahmi Ahmad Jennah	Table tennis	Men's singles TT11	8 June
Silver	Malaysia national blind football team	Blind football	Men's team	8 June
Silver	Gloria Gracia Wong Sze	Table tennis	Women's singles TT10	8 June

=== Bronze ===
Medal	Name	Sport	Event	Date
Bronze	Freday Tan Yei Bing; Karthik Kana Pathy; Muhamad Atib Zakaria; Muhammad Azzwar Hassan Asaari; Razali Cantik	Wheelchair basketball	Men's 3x3 tournament	3 June
Bronze	Lim Carmen	Swimming	Women's 100m freestyle S7-8	4 June
Bronze	Nur Hidayah Mohd Izaha	Athletics	Women's long jump T20	4 June
Bronze	Muhamad Nurdin Ibrahim	Athletics	Men's 1500m T20	4 June
Bronze	Muhammad Nur Syaiful Zulkafli	Swimming	Men's 200m freestyle S5	5 June
Bronze	Duran Yaspi Imam Basori	Swimming	Men's 100m backstroke S14	5 June
Bronze	Muhammad Imaan Aiman Muhammad Redzuan	Swimming	Men's 50m butterfly S14	5 June
Bronze	Bibiana Ahmad	Powerlifting	Women's up to 67 kg - total	5 June
Bronze	Mohamed Faizal Aideal Suhaimi	Athletics	Men's 100m T12	5 June
Bronze	Nik Mohamad Rahmat Mohd Zahari	Athletics	Men's long jump T20	5 June
Bronze	Muhammad Ammar Aiman Nor Azmi	Athletics	Men's 800m T20	5 June
Bronze	Lee Chee Hock	Judo	Men's -90 kg	5 June
Bronze	Doriah Poulus	Athletics	Women's discus throw F44	5 June
Bronze	Bryan Lau Sze Kai	Swimming	Men's 100m butterfly S14	6 June
Bronze	Ethan Khoo Yin Jun	Swimming	Men's 200m individual medley SM14	6 June
Bronze	Abd Halim Mohammad; Fraidden Dawan; Jaflee Jikol; Muhammad Nur Syaiful Zulkafli	Swimming	Men's team 4x100m medley relay 34 pts	6 June
Bronze	Heronlee Wong	Athletics	Men's discus throw F37	6 June
Bronze	Nasharuddin Mohd	Athletics	Men's 400m T20	6 June
Bronze	Fraidden Dawan	Swimming	Men's 50m butterfly S10	7 June
Bronze	Muhammad Nur Syaiful Zulkafli	Swimming	Men's 100m breaststroke SB4	7 June
Bronze	Wan Nur Azri Wan Azman	Powerlifting	Men's up to 97 kg - total	7 June
Bronze	Chua Tze Kah; Freday Tan Yei Bing; Karthik Kana Pathy; Marzuan Abdullah; Mohammad Sharafazan Khairuddin; Muhamad Atib Zakaria; Muhammad Azzwar Hassan Asaari; Muhammad Hafiz Ramli; Razali Cantik; Tan Wei Min	Wheelchair basketball	Men's 5x5 tournament	7 June
Bronze	Badrul Hisam Musa	Athletics	Men's discus throw F12	7 June
Bronze	Badrul Hisam Musa	Athletics	Men's javelin throw F12	7 June
Bronze	Izzah Athirah Tajuddin; Nur Amalina Hares; Nur Shazatul Nadhirah Mohd Shuhaidi; Athirah Azman; Lim Zi Ling; Nurin Amalin Ishak	Goalball	Women's tournament	8 June
Bronze	Ethan Khoo Yin Jun	Swimming	Men's 50m freestyle S14	8 June
Bronze	Abdul Razzaq Abdul Rahman; Noor Askuzaimey Mat Salim	Boccia	Mixed pair BC4	8 June
Bronze	Chee Chaoming	Table tennis	Men's singles TT9	8 June
Bronze	Muhammad Huzairi Abdul Malek	Badminton	Men's singles SL3	8 June
Bronze	Muhammad Amin Azmi	Badminton	Men's singles SH6	8 June
Bronze	Muhammad Fareez Anuar; Mohamad Faris Ahmad Azri	Badminton	Men's doubles SU5	8 June
Bronze	Amyrul Yazid Ahmad Sibi; Mhd Amin Burhanuddin	Badminton	Men's doubles SU5	8 June
Bronze	Chew Jit Thye	Badminton	Men's singles WH1	8 June
Bronze	Ashley Irenaeus Jeck; Chew Jit Thye	Badminton	Men's doubles WH1-WH2	8 June

== Athletics ==
=== Men's ===
Road & track events

Athlete	Event	Heats		Final	
Athlete	Event	Result	Rank	Result	Rank
Mohamed Faizal Aideal Suhaimi	100m T12	11.67	2	11.58	3rd place, bronze medalist(s)
Muhamad Afiq Mohamad Ali Hanafiah	100m T12	11.10	1	11.36	2nd place, silver medalist(s)
Muhamad Afiq Mohamad Ali Hanafiah	200m T12	—N/a		23.16	2nd place, silver medalist(s)
Muhamad Afiq Mohamad Ali Hanafiah	400m T12	53.60	2	DNS	
Nasharuddin Mohd	400m T20	51.53	1	50.75	3rd place, bronze medalist(s)
Muhamamd Ammar Aiman Nor Azmi	400m T20	51.38	1	48.42	1st place, gold medalist(s)
Muhamamd Ammar Aiman Nor Azmi	800m T20	—N/a		02:09.33	3rd place, bronze medalist(s)
Muhammad Haqeem Mustaqim Husmadi	800m T20	—N/a		02:09.65	4
Muhammad Haqeem Mustaqim Husmadi	1500m T20	—N/a		04:18.86	2nd place, silver medalist(s)
Muhamad Nurdin Ibrahim	1500m T20	—N/a		04:19.07	3rd place, bronze medalist(s)
Muhamad Nurdin Ibrahim	5000m T20	—N/a		17:22.96	1st place, gold medalist(s)
Ahmad Fizzi Rosni	100m T37	—N/a		12.90	2nd place, silver medalist(s)
Ahmad Fizzi Rosni	200m T36-37	—N/a		25.62	2nd place, silver medalist(s)
Ahmad Fizzi Rosni	400m T36-38	—N/a		56.97	2
Muhammad Faiz Haizat Rosdi	800m T38	—N/a		02:12.70	2nd place, silver medalist(s)
Muhammad Faiz Haizat Rosdi	1500m T38	—N/a		04:37.49	2nd place, silver medalist(s)
Eddy Bernard	100m T44	—N/a		10.60	1st place, gold medalist(s)
Muhammad Ashraf Muhammad Haisham	800m T46	—N/a		02:13.25	2nd place, silver medalist(s)
Muhammad Ashraf Muhammad Haisham	1500m T46	—N/a		04:24.22	1st place, gold medalist(s)
Muhammad Ashraf Muhammad Haisham	5000m T46	—N/a		18:49.42	1st place, gold medalist(s)

Field events

Athlete	Event	Final	
Athlete	Event	Result	Rank
Badrul Hisam Musa	Discus throw F12	26.16	3rd place, bronze medalist(s)
Badrul Hisam Musa	Javelin throw F12	35.92	3rd place, bronze medalist(s)
Badrul Hisam Musa	Shot put F12	10.65	2nd place, silver medalist(s)
Taufik Hidayat Nasirdin	Discus throw F34	12.72	3
Taufik Hidayat Nasirdin	Javelin throw F34	13.19	2
Taufik Hidayat Nasirdin	Shot put F34	5.90	3
Heronlee Wong	Discus throw F37	34.24	3rd place, bronze medalist(s)
Heronlee Wong	Javelin throw F37	34.24	2nd place, silver medalist(s)
Heronlee Wong	Shot put F37	9.00	4
Muhammad Amirul Alif Abdul Raof	Discus throw F55	20.08	5
Muhammad Amirul Alif Abdul Raof	Shot put F55	8.98	2nd place, silver medalist(s)
Mohammad Zikri Zakaria	Javelin throw F55	20.51	5
Mohammad Zikri Zakaria	Shot put F55	9.86	1st place, gold medalist(s)
Mohd Shahmil Md Saad	Javelin throw F56	16.21	4
Mohd Shahmil Md Saad	Shot put F56	8.78	1st place, gold medalist(s)
Mohamad Saifuddin Ishak	Long jump T11-12	6.18	1st place, gold medalist(s)
Wong Kar Gee	Long jump T13	6.24	2nd place, silver medalist(s)
Zulkifly Abdullah	Long jump T20	6.72	1st place, gold medalist(s)
Eljoe Gotuoh	Long jump T20	6.65	2nd place, silver medalist(s)
Nik Mohamad Rahmat Mohd Zahari	Long jump T20	6.47	3rd place, bronze medalist(s)
Muhammad Nazmi Nasri	Long jump T37-38	5.29	2nd place, silver medalist(s)
Eddy Bernard	Long jump T42-44	6.32	1st place, gold medalist(s)
Mohamad Aliff Mohamad Awi	Shot put T20	13.86	1st place, gold medalist(s)

=== Women's ===
Field events

Athlete	Event	Final	
Athlete	Event	Result	Rank
Doriah Poulus	Discus throw F44	22.36	3rd place, bronze medalist(s)
Doriah Poulus	Javelin throw F44	24.97	1st place, gold medalist(s)
Doriah Poulus	Shot put F44	8.65	1st place, gold medalist(s)
Nani Shahiera Zawawi	Long jump T20	5.16	1st place, gold medalist(s)
Nur Hidayah Mohd Izaha	Long jump T20	4.81	3rd place, bronze medalist(s)
Elissieball Jonal	Long jump T20	4.50	4
Noor Imanina Idris	Shot put F20	10.57	2nd place, silver medalist(s)
Siti Noraidah Suherman	Shot put F20	9.31	4

== Badminton ==
=== Men ===
Athlete	Event	Group stage				Quarterfinals	Semifinal	Final / BM	
Athlete	Event	Opposition Score	Opposition Score	Opposition Score	Rank	Opposition Score	Opposition Score	Opposition Score	Rank
Muhammad Amin Azmi	Singles SH6	Rith Metriey (CAM); W 2–0 (21–2, 21–1)	Xaiver Jie Rui Lim (SGP); W 2–0 (21–7, 21–8)	—N/a	1 Q	Bunthan Yaemmali (THA); W 2–0 (21–15, 21–18)	Subhan (INA); L 0–2 (15–21, 11–21)	Did not advance	3rd place, bronze medalist(s)
Muhammad Huzairi Abdul Malek	Singles SL3	Dwiyoko (INA); W 2–1 (21–16, 18–21, 21–13)	Singha Sangnil (THA); W 2–1 (20–22, 21–14, 21–15)	—N/a	1 Q	Poloong Loc (VIE); W 2–1 (15–21, 21–19, 21–6)	Mongkhon Bunsun (THA); L 0–2 (11–21, 13–21)	Did not advance	3rd place, bronze medalist(s)
Muhammad Zulfatihi Jafaar	Singles SL4	Isma Rafiq Jaime (BRU); W 2–0 (21–16, 21–10)	Hikmat Ramdani (INA); L 0–2 (7–21, 14–21)	—N/a	2 Q	Chawarat Kittichokwattana (THA); L 0–2 (16–21, 12–21)	Did not advance		
Mhd Amin Burhanuddin	Singles SL4	Nguyen Van Thuong (VIE); W 2–0 (21–11, 21–5)	Siripong Teamarrom (THA); W 2–0 (21–14, 21–7)	—N/a	1 Q	Chee Hiong Ang (SGP); W 2–0 (21–11, 21–16)	Fredy Setiawan (INA); W 2–0 (21–12, 21–14)	Hikmat Ramdani (INA); W 2–1 (21–18, 9–21, 21–14)	1st place, gold medalist(s)
Muhammad Fareez Anuar	Singles SU5	Pham Van Toi (VIE); W 2–0 (21–15, 21–8)	Suryo Nugroho (INA); L 0–2 (20–22, 18–21)	—N/a	2 Q	Dheva Anrimusthi (INA); L 0–2 (14–21, 9–21)	Did not advance		
Amyrul Yazid Ahmad Sibi	Singles SU5	Nattaphon Thaweesap (THA); W 2–0 (21–18, 21–14)	Wei Ming Tay (SGP); L 0–2 (14–21, 18–21)	—N/a	2 Q	Suryo Nugroho (INA); L 0–2 (10–22, 13–21)	Did not advance		
Mohamad Faris Ahmad Azri	Singles SU5	Oddie Kurnia Dwi Listyanto Putra (INA); L 0–2 (21–23, 17–21)	Choa Thyrith (CAM); W 2–0 (21–8, 21–7)	Antonio Dela Cruz Jr (PHI); W 2–0 (21–8, 21–8)	2 Q	Wei Ming Tay (SGP); L 1–2 (21–17, 17–21, 18–21)	Did not advance		
Muhammad Ikhwan Ramli	Singles WH1	Agung Widodo (INA); W 2–0 (22–20, 21–6)	Jakarin Homhual (THA); W 2–0 (21–15, 21–14)	—N/a	1 Q	—N/a	Chatchai Kornpeekanok (THA); W 2–0 (21–6, 21–14)	Jakarin Homhual (THA); W 2–0 (21–15, 21–14)	1st place, gold medalist(s)
Chew Jit Thye	Singles WH1	Hoang Manh Giang (VIE); W 2–1 (21–12, 18–21, 21–5)	Chatchai Kornpeekanok (THA); W 2–1 (15–21, 21–11, 21–17)	Anuwat Sriboran (THA); W 2–1 (11–21, 23–21, 21–9)	1 Q	—N/a	Jakarin Homhual (THA); L 0–2 (5–21, 7–21)	Did not advance	3rd place, bronze medalist(s)
Noor Azwan Noorlan	Singles WH2	Agus Budi Utomo (INA); L 1–2 (21–16, 19–21, 19–21)	Aphichat Saumprodit (THA); W 2–0 (21–18, 21–7)	—N/a	2 Q	Wiwin Andri (INA); L 0–2 (13–21, 11–21)	Did not advance		
Ashley Irenaeus Jeck	Singles WH2	Hoang Cong Dong (VIE); W 2–0 (21–13, 21–12)	Wiwin Andri (INA); L 0–2 (15–21, 19–21)	—N/a	2 Q	Supriadi (INA); L 0–2 (8–21, 14–21)	Did not advance		
Muhammad Zulfatihi Jaafar; Muhammad Huzairi Abdul Malek	Doubles SL3-SL4	Hari Susanto / Ukun Rukaendi (INA); L 0–2 (19–21, 10–21)	Chawarat Kittichokwattana / Mongkhon Bunsun (THA); L 0–2 (10–21, 14–21)	Poloong Loc / Ta Truc (VIE); L 0–2 (20–22, 12–21)	4	Did not advance			
Mohamad Faris Ahmad Azri; Muhammad Fareez Anuar	Doubles SU5	Bui Minh Hai / Pham Van Toi (VIE); W 2–1 (19–21, 21–13, 21–18)	Dheva Anrimusthi / Hafizh Briliansyah Prawiranegara (INA); L 0–2 (15–21, 10–21)	Nattaphon Thaweesap / Pricha Somsiri (THA); W 2–0 (21–9, 21–16)	2 Q	—N/a	Oddie Kurnia Dwi Listyanto Putra / Suryo Nugroho (INA); L 1–2 (16–21, 21–19, 22–24)	Did not advance	3rd place, bronze medalist(s)
Amyrul Yazid Ahmad Sibi; Mhd Amin Burhanuddin	Doubles SU5	Oddie Kurnia Dwi Listyanto Putra / Suryo Nugroho (INA); L 0–2 (12–21, 16–21)	Chee Hiong Ang / Wei Ming Tay (SGP); W 2–0 (21–18, 21–12)	Antonio Dela Cruz Jr / Basil Anthony Esolana Hermogenes (PHI); W 2–0 (21–10, 21–14)	2 Q	—N/a	Dheva Anrimusthi / Hafizh Briliansyah Prawiranegara (INA); L 0–2 (11–21, 9–21)	Did not advance	3rd place, bronze medalist(s)
Muhammad Ikhwan Ramli; Noor Azwan Noorlan	Doubles WH1-WH2	Aphichat Sumpradit / Chatchai Kornpeekanok (THA); W 2–0 (21–14, 21–13)	Agung Widodo / Supriadi (INA); W 2–0 (21–13, 22–20)	—N/a	1 Q	—N/a	Ashley Irenaeus Jeck / Chew Jit Thye (MAS); W 2–0 (21–14, 21–14)	Dumnern Junthong / Jakiran Homhual (THA); W 2–1 (14–21, 21–17, 21–9)	1st place, gold medalist(s)
Ashley Irenaeus Jeck; Chew Jit Thye	Doubles WH1-WH2	Hoang Manh Giang / Truong Ngoc Binh (VIE); W 2–1 (14–21, 21–19, 21–18)	Dumnern Junthong / Jakiran Homhual (THA); L 0–2 (12–21, 8–21)	—N/a	2 Q	—N/a	Muhammad Ikhwan Ramli / Noor Azwan Noorlan (MAS); L 0–2 (14–21, 14–21)	Did not advance	3rd place, bronze medalist(s)
Mhd Amin Burhanuddin; Muhammad Zulfatihi Jaafar; Muhammad Huzairi Abdul Malek; Amyrul Yazid Ahmad Sibi; Mohamad Faris Ahmad Azri; Muhammad Fareez Anuar	Team standing	—N/a					Thailand; W 2–1	Indonesia; L 1–2	2nd place, silver medalist(s)
Muhammad Ikhwan Ramli; Ashley Irenaeus Jeck; Chew Jit Thye; Noor Azwan Noorlan	Team WH	—N/a						Thailand; L 1–2	2

== Blind Football ==
Team	Event	Group Stage				Final / BM	
Team	Event	Opposition Score	Opposition Score	Opposition Score	Rank	Opposition Score	Rank
Malaysia national blind football team	Men's team	Thailand; L 0-2	Laos; W 3-0	Cambodia; W 2-1	2 Q	Thailand; L 0-4	2nd place, silver medalist(s)

Squad

- Ahmad Fikri Omar
- Luqman Hakim Mohd Sukri
- Mohd Azuwan Atan
- Muhamad Azuan Abdul Rasiad
- Rollen Marakim
- Meor Shahrul Azha Mat Salleh
- Mohd Al Hakim Noordin
- Mohd Azwan Azhar
- Muhammad Rafique Farhan Saiful
- Sulaiman Nor Azizan

== Boccia ==
=== Men ===
Athlete	Event	Pool matches					Quarterfinals	Semifinals	Final / BM	
Athlete	Event	Opposition Score	Opposition Score	Opposition Score	Opposition Score	Rank	Opposition Score	Opposition Score	Opposition Score	Rank
Parthiban Arpurusamy	Individual BC1	Witsanu Huadpradit (THA); L 0–10	Joey Eriga De Leon (PHI); L 1–7	Khamsing Khaoon (LAO); W 10–2	—N/a	3	Did not advance			
Willyien Cliff Honseng	Individual BC1	Thinnakorn Thepdaeng (THA); L 0–9	Muhamad Afrizal Syafa (INA); L 4–5	John Iver Dhan Montiano Quintana (PHI); L 2–5	—N/a	4	Did not advance			
Mohammad Syafiq Mohd Noh	Individual BC2	Jakai Lee (LAO); W 9–1	John Loyd Estavillo Villaroya (PHI); W 13–1	Watcharaphon Vongsa (THA); L 2–12	—N/a	2 Q	Muhammad Bintang Satria Herlangga (INA); L 1–9	Did not advance		
Iman Haikal Saifulifram	Individual BC2	Veasna Pril (CAM); L 1–5	Muhammad Bintang Satria Herlangga (INA); L 0–11	—N/a		3	Did not advance			
Vikneshwaran Tiagarajan	Individual BC3	Trimo Coba Kuwat (INA); L 2–8	Aloysius Kai Hong Gan (SGP); L 1–7	Akadej Choochuenklin (THA); L 0–14	Gareth Ho Jing Rui (SGP); L 1–9	—N/a				5
Abdul Razzaq Abdul Rahman	Individual BC4	Ritthikrai Somsanuk (THA); L 0–8	Nguyen Ba Vuong (VIE); W 8–2	Nak Vanna (CAM); L 0–10	—N/a	3	Did not advance			

=== Women ===
Athlete	Event	Pool matches					Quarterfinals	Semifinals	Final / BM	
Athlete	Event	Opposition Score	Opposition Score	Opposition Score	Opposition Score	Rank	Opposition Score	Opposition Score	Opposition Score	Rank
Angeline Melissa Lawas	Individual BC1	Touny Onemouy (LAO); W 4–3	Satanan Phromsiri (THA); L 6–1	—N/a		2	Did not advance			
Avrinda Anis	Individual BC2	Sorn Sas (CAM); W 6–0	Febriyanti Vani Rahmadhani (INA); W 8–1	—N/a		1 Q	—N/a	Nguyen Nhat Uyen (VIE); L 2–3	Sorn Sas (CAM); L 7–1	4
Lim Yin Xiang	Individual BC3	Sze Ning Toh (SGP); L 0–10	Ladamanee Kla–Han (THA); L 0–17	Suci Kirana Dewi (INA); L 1–6	Juthamat Rattana (THA); L 1–5	—N/a				5
Noor Askuzaimey Mat Salim	Individual BC4	Wening Purbawati (INA); W 12–0	Nuanchan Phonsila (THA); W 5–1	—N/a		1 Q	—N/a	Michelle Saniel Fernandez (PHI); W 6–1	Chalisa Khiawjantra (THA); W 6–1	1st place, gold medalist(s)

=== Mixed ===
Athlete	Event	Pool matches					Quarterfinals	Semifinals	Final / BM	
Athlete	Event	Opposition Score	Opposition Score	Opposition Score	Opposition Score	Rank	Opposition Score	Opposition Score	Opposition Score	Rank
Lim Yin Xiang; Vikneshwaran Tiagarajan	Pair BC3	Akkadej Choochuenklin / Ladamanee Kla–Han (THA); L 0–11	Aloysius Kai Hong Gan / Sze Ning Toh (SGP); L 1–10	Suci Kirana Dewi / Trimo Coba Kuwat (INA); L	—N/a					4
Abdul Razzaq Abdul Rahman; Noor Askuzaimey Mat Salim	Pair BC4	Nuanchan Phonsila / Ritthikrai Somsanuk (THA); L 2–6	Nak Vanna / Sary Sourn (CAM); L 2–4	Faris Sugiarta / Wening Purbawati (INA); W 4–0	Michelle Saniel Fernandez / Ramon Reyyemanuel Galindo Apilado (PHI); W 10–1	—N/a				3rd place, bronze medalist(s)
Angeline Melissa Lawas; Iman Haikal Saifulifram; Mohammad Syafiq Mohd Noh	Team BC1-2	Philippines (PHI); L 4–6	Indonesia (INA); L 0–14	—N/a		3	Did not advance			

== Chess ==
=== Men ===
Athlete	Event	Class	Round 1	Round 2	Round 3	Round 4	Round 5	Round 6	Total score	Rank
Athlete	Event	Class	Opposition Score	Opposition Score	Opposition Score	Opposition Score	Opposition Score	Opposition Score	Total score	Rank
Ahmad Nazmi Md Nizam	Individual blitz	PI	Abilio De Araujo (TLS); W 1–0	Maksum Firdaus (INA); L 0–1	Tirto (INA); L 0–1	Ardian Syah Muming (MAS); D 0.5–0.5	Moeurn Ke (CAM); W 1–0	Rottina Pen (CAM); W 1–0	3.5	8
Ardian Syah Muming	Individual blitz	PI	Nguyen Van Quan (VIE); L 0–1	Vandy Sin (CAM); L 0–1	Moeurn Ke (CAM); W 1–0	Ahmad Nazmi Md Nizam (MAS); D 0.5–0.5	Alfrets Dien (INA); L 0–1	Yoodthana Khoonmee (THA); W 1–0	2.5	12
Mohammed Johar Johari	Individual blitz	VI-B1	Francis Bautista Ching (PHI); L 0–1	Phongkit Sriraksa (THA); L 0–1	Jakkawan Chimyam (THA); W 1–0	Rodolfo De Villa Sarmiento (PHI); L 0–1	Amandio Martins Do Rego (TLS); W 1–0	Myo San Aung (MYA); L 0–1	2.0	16
Muhammad Farhan Norhayalim	Individual blitz	VI-B1	Ceceilio Espina Bilog (PHI); L 0–1	Prasetyo Fitriyanto (INA); L 0–1	Myo San Aung (MYA); L 0–1	Amandio Martins Do Rego (TLS); W 1–0	Jakkawan Chimyam (THA); W 1–0	Dinh Tuan Son (VIE); W 1–0	3.0	11
Hanson Ang Ping Ting	Individual blitz	VI-B2/B3	Jumadi (INA); L 0–1	Lennard Lai Zhun Hoong (MAS); L 0–1	Lin Htet Naung (MYA); W 1–0	Pham Le Anh Kiet (VIE); L 0–1	Hla Moe (MYA); L 0–1	Gayuh Satrio (INA); L 0–1	2.0	11
Lennard Lai Zhun Hoong	Individual blitz	VI-B2/B3	Adji Hartono (INA); D 0.5–0.5	Hanson Ang Ping Ting (MAS); W 0–1	Arman Sapida Subaste (PHI); L 0–1	Maw Shay (MYA); D 0.5–0.5	Jumadi (INA); W 1–0	Pham Le Anh Kiet (VIE); L 0–1	3.0	9
Ahmad Nazmi Md Nizam	Individual rapid	PI	Sander De Erit Severino (PHI); L 0–1	Methavee Thassanamethin (THA); W 1–0	Vandy Sin (CAM); W 1–0	Yoodthana Khoonmee (THA); W 1–0	Duong Hien Vuong (VIE); W 1–0	Maksum Firdaus (INA); L 0–1	4.0	4
Ardian Syah Muming	Individual rapid	PI	Rottina Pen (CAM); W 1–0	Maksum Firdaus (INA); L 0–1	Yoodthana Khoonmee (THA); L 0–1	Methavee Thassanamethin (THA); L 0–1	Vandy Sin (CAM); L 0–1	Moeurn Ke (CAM); W 1–0	2.0	12
Mohammed Johar Johari	Individual rapid	VI-B1	Than Htay (MYA); W 1–0	Indra Yoga (INA); L 0–1	Myo San Aung (MYA); W 1–0	Prasetyo Fitriyanto (INA); L 0–1	Rodolfo De Villa Sarmiento (PHI); L 0–1	Dinh Tuan Son (VIE); W 1–0	3.0	9
Muhammad Farhan Norhayalim	Individual rapid	VI-B1	Francis Bautista Ching (PHI); L 0–1	Prasetyo Fitriyanto (INA); L 0–1	Amandio Martins Do Rego (TLS); W 1–0	Than Htay (MYA); W 1–0	Dinh Tuan Son (VIE); W 1–0	Dao Tuan Kiet (VIE); L 0–1	3.0	8
Hanson Ang Ping Ting	Individual rapid	VI-B2/B3	Gayuh Satrio (INA); L 0–1	Hla Moe (MYA); W 1–0	Lin Htet Naung (MYA); W 1–0	Menandro Junnil Redor (PHI); L 0–1	Lennard Lai Zhun Hoong (MAS); W 1–0	Israel Dela Rosa Peligro (PHI); D 0.5–0.5	3.5	6
Lennard Lai Zhun Hoong	Individual rapid	VI-B2/B3	Maw Shay (MYA); L 0–1	Israel Dela Rosa Peligro (PHI); L 0–1	Nguyen Anh Tan (VIE); L 0–1	Hla Moe (MYA); L 0–1	Hanson Ang Ping Ting (MAS); L 0–1	Lin Htet Naung (MYA); L 0–1	0.0	14
Ahmad Nazmi Md Nizam	Individual standard	PI	Chanon Mongkoltawephun (THA); W 1–0	Nguyen Van Quan (VIE); W 1–0	Tirto (INA); L 0–1	Maksum Firdaus (INA); D 0.5–0.5	Nguyen Anh Tuan (VIE); W 1–0	Henry Roger Iligan Lopez (PHI); L 0–1	3.5	6
Ardian Syah Muming	Individual standard	PI	Nguyen Anh Tuan (VIE); L 0–1	Chea Kem (CAM); W 1–0	Nguyen Van Quan (VIE); L 0–1	Channtha Choek (CAM); W 1–0	Jasper Belarmino Rom (PHI); L 0–1	Yoodthana Khoonmee (THA); L 0–1	2.0	14
Mohammed Johar Johari	Individual standard	VI-B1	Anthony Frias Abogado (PHI); L 0–1	Kaung San (MYA); L 0–1	Jakkawan Chimyam (THA); W 1–0	Cecilio Espina Bilog (PHI); D 0.5–0.5	Than Htay (MYA); W 1–0	Kansak Saenpoch (THA); L 0–1	2.5	12
Muhammad Farhan Norhayalim	Individual standard	VI-B1	Amandio Martins Do Rego (TLS); W 1–0	Indra Yoga (INA); L 0–1	Myo San Aung (MYA); D 0.5–0.5	Kansak Saenpoch (THA); W 1–0	Le Van Viet (VIE); L 0–1	Anthony Frias Abogado (PHI); W 1–0	3.5	6
Hanson Ang Ping Ting	Individual standard	VI-B2/B3	Lennard Lai Zhun Hoong (MAS); L 0–1	Menandro Junnil Redor (PHI); L 0–1	Hla Moe (MYA); W 1–0	Lin Htet Naung (MYA); D 0.5–0.5	Nguyen Anh Tan (VIE); W 1–0	Adji Hartono (INA); L 0–1	2.5	9
Lennard Lai Zhun Hoong	Individual standard	VI-B2/B3	Hanson Ang Ping Ting (MAS); W 1–0	Gayuh Satrio (INA); L 0–1	Arman Sapida Subaste (PHI); L 0–1	Maw Shay (MYA); L 0–1	Hla Moe (MYA); D 0.5–0.5	Lin Htet Naung (MYA); L 0–1	1.5	12
Ahmad Nazmi Md Nizam; Ardian Syah Muming	Team blitz	PI	—N/a						6.0	4
Mohammed Johar Johari; Muhammad Farhan Norhayalim	Team blitz	VI-B1	—N/a						5.0	6
Hanson Ang Ping Ting; Lennard Lai Zhun Hoong	Team blitz	VI-B2/B3	—N/a						5.0	4
Ahmad Nazmi Md Nizam; Ardian Syah Muming	Team rapid	PI	—N/a						6.0	4
Mohammed Johar Johari; Muhammad Farhan Norhayalim	Team rapid	VI-B1	—N/a						6.0	5
Hanson Ang Ping Ting; Lennard Lai Zhun Hoong	Team rapid	VI-B2/B3	—N/a						3.5	5
Ahmad Nazmi Md Nizam; Ardian Syah Muming	Team standard	PI	—N/a						5.5	5
Mohammed Johar Johari; Muhammad Farhan Norhayalim	Team standard	VI-B1	—N/a						6.0	5
Hanson Ang Ping Ting; Lennard Lai Zhun Hoong	Team standard	VI-B2/B3	—N/a						4.0	4

=== Women ===
Athlete	Event	Class	Round 1	Round 2	Round 3	Round 4	Round 5	Round 6	Total score	Rank
Athlete	Event	Class	Opposition Score	Opposition Score	Opposition Score	Opposition Score	Opposition Score	Opposition Score	Total score	Rank
Aqilah Syahira Ahmad	Individual blitz	PI	Nasib Farta Simanja (INA); W 1–0	Yuni (INA); L 0–1	Lim Yee Jin (MAS); W 1–0	Doan Thu Huyen (VIE); L 0–1	Lilis Herna Yulia (INA); L 0–1	Jean-Lee Rosero Nacita (PHI); W 1–0	3.0	6
Lim Yee Jin	Individual blitz	PI	Cheryl Abella Angot (PHI); W 1–0	Cheyzer Mendoza (PHI); L 0–1	Aqilah Syahira Ahmad (MAS); L 0–1	Jean-Lee Rosero Nacita (PHI); D 0.5–0.5	Nguyen Thi Kieu (VIE); L 0–1	Nasib Farta Simanja (INA); W 1–0	2.5	8
Norhayati Sarnoh	Individual blitz	VI-B1	Wilma Margaretha Sinaga (INA); L 0–1	Dao Thi Le Xuan (VIE); W 1–0	Katrina Mangawang (PHI); W 1–0	Tran Ngoc Loan (VIE); L 0–1	Tita Puspita (INA); L 0–1	Yustina Halawa (INA); W 1–0	3.0	4
Nur Hafizah Shaharuddin	Individual blitz	VI-B1	—N/a	Wilma Margaretha Sinaga (INA); L 0–1	Evangeline Gamao (PHI); L 0–1	Elena Ledesma Peligro (PHI); W 1–0	Dao Thi Le Xuan (VIE); L 0–1	Katrina Mangawang (PHI); L 0–1	2.0	9
Thoo Siaw Lan	Individual blitz	VI-B2/B3	Aisah Wijayanti (INA); L 0–1	Nguyen Thi Minh Thu (VIE); W 1–0	Chanaporn Botkate (THA); L 0–1	Kannika Khuijanthuek (THA); W 1–0	Maria Teresa Bilog (PHI); L 0–1	Nonglak Siripatvanich (THA); W 1–0	3.0	8
Aqilah Syahira Ahmad	Individual rapid	PI	Tran Thi Bich Thuy (VIE); W 1–0	Cheyzer Mendoza (PHI); L 0–1	Lilis Herna Yulia (INA); L 0–1	Jean-Lee Rosero Nacita (PHI); L 0–1	Lim Yee Jin (MAS); W 1–0	Cheryl Abella Angot (PHI); W 1–0	3.0	5
Lim Yee Jin	Individual rapid	PI	Cheryl Abella Angot (PHI); W 1–0	Doan Thu Huyen (VIE); L 0–1	Jean-Lee Rosero Nacita (PHI); L 0–1	Yuni (INA); L 0–1	Aqilah Syahira Ahmad (MAS); L 0–1	Cheyzer Mendoza (PHI); L 0–1	1.0	10
Norhayati Sarnoh	Individual rapid	VI-B1	Tita Puspita (INA); L 0–1	Katrina Mangawang (PHI); L 0–1	—N/a	Wilma Margaretha Sinaga (INA); L 0–1	Elena Ledesma Peligro (PHI); W 1–0	Evangeline Gamao (PHI); W 1–0	3.0	8
Nur Hafizah Shaharuddin	Individual rapid	VI-B1	Pham Thi Huong (VIE); W 1–0	Tran Ngoc Loan (VIE); L 0–1	Dao Thi Le Xuan (VIE); L 0–1	Yustina Halawa (INA); L 0–1	Wilma Margaretha Sinaga (INA); L 0–1	Elena Ledesma Peligro (PHI); L 0–1	1.0	11
Thoo Siaw Lan	Individual rapid	VI-B2/B3	Maria Teresa Bilog (PHI); L 0–1	Charmaine Mendoza Tonic (PHI); W 1–0	Chanaporn Botkate (THA); W 1–0	Farah Yumna Budiarti (INA); L 0–1	Khairunnisa (INA); L 0–1	—N/a	3.0	8
Aqilah Syahira Ahmad	Individual standard	PI	Navarrete Mangayayam (PHI); L 0–1	Nasib Farta Simanja (INA); L 0–1	Lim Yee Jin (MAS); L 0–1	Yuni (INA); L 0–1	Nguyen Thi Kieu (VIE); L 0–1	Cheyzer Mendoza (PHI); D 0.5–0.5	0.5	10
Lim Yee Jin	Individual standard	PI	Nguyen Thi Kieu (VIE); L 0–1	Lilis Herna Yulia (INA); L 0–1	Aqilah Syahira Ahmad (MAS); W 1–0	Doan Thu Huyen (VIE); L 0–1	Yuni (INA); L 0–1	Navarrete Mangayayam (PHI); W 1–0	2.0	9
Norhayati Sarnoh	Individual standard	VI-B1	Wilma Margaretha Sinaga (INA); L 0–1	Yustina Halawa (INA); L 0–1	—N/a	Nur Hafizah Shaharuddin (MAS); W 1–0	Elena Ledesma Peligro (PHI); L 0–1	Katrina Mangawang (PHI); W 1–0	3.0	8
Nur Hafizah Shaharuddin	Individual standard	VI-B1	—N/a	Wilma Margaretha Sinaga (INA); L 0–1	Dao Thi Le Xuan (VIE); L 0–1	Norhayati Sarnoh (MAS); L 0–1	Evangeline Gamao (PHI); L 0–1	Elena Ledesma Peligro (PHI); L 0–1	1.0	11
Thoo Siaw Lan	Individual standard	VI-B2/B3	Maria Teresa Bilog (PHI); W 1–0	Aisah Wijayanti (INA); L 0–1	Nguyen Thi Minh Thu (VIE); W 1–0	Nguyen Thi My Linh (VIE); L 0–1	Chanaporn Botkate (THA); L 0–1	—N/a	3.0	8
Aqilah Syahira Ahmad; Lim Yee Jin	Team blitz	PI	—N/a						5.5	4
Norhayati Sarnoh; Nur Hafizah Shaharuddin	Team blitz	VI-B1	—N/a						5.0	4
Aqilah Syahira Ahmad; Lim Yee Jin	Team rapid	PI	—N/a						4.0	4
Norhayati Sarnoh; Nur Hafizah Shaharuddin	Team rapid	VI-B1	—N/a						4.0	4
Thoo Siaw Lan	Team rapid	VI-B2/B3	—N/a						3.0	5
Aqilah Syahira Ahmad; Lim Yee Jin	Team standard	PI	—N/a						2.5	4
Norhayati Sarnoh; Nur Hafizah Shaharuddin	Team standard	VI-B1	—N/a						4.0	4

== Esports ==
eSports is being featured at the 2023 ASEAN Para Games as a demonstration sport, meaning medals won in this sport will not be counted in the official overall medal tally.

Athlete	Event	Group Stage				Semifinals	Final / BM	
Athlete	Event	Opposition Score	Opposition Score	Opposition Score	Rank	Opposition Score	Opposition Score	Rank
Ahmad Syakirin Zamharin; Aminuddin Al-Hafiz Ismahisham; Hafizuddin Abdul Ghani; Muhammad Danish Danial Hairi; Muhammad Elmi Khuzairi Abdullah; Usamah Ariffin Abdillah	Men's Mobile Legends	Thailand; W 2–0	Cambodia; W 2–0	Philippines; L 0–2	2	Cambodia; W 2–0	Philippines; L 0–3	2nd place, silver medalist(s)

== Football 7-a-side ==
Team	Event	Group Stage			Semifinals	Final / BM	
Team	Event	Opposition Score	Opposition Score	Rank	Opposition Score	Opposition Score	Rank
Malaysia men's	Team	Indonesia; L 1-5	Cambodia; W 5-3	2	Thailand; W 6(2)–6(1)	Indonesia; W 1(3)–1(1)	1st place, gold medalist(s)

Squad

- Abdullah Reduan Abd Samat
- Adray Uzair Abu Bakar
- Mohamad Sobri Ghazali
- Mohd Farissan Jasnal
- Muhammad Syukri Abdul Razak
- Muhammad Uthman Surur
- Noor Muhammad Ariff Yusoff
- Ahmad Azizan A Aziz
- Ahmad Farihan Mohamed Kassim
- Khairulnizam Engkeh
- Muhamad Firdaus Bakar
- Muhamad Shafiq Zahari
- Muhamad Khairi Ismail
- Nasveer Singh Thaker Singh

== Goalball ==
Team	Event	Group Stage					Semifinals	Final / BM	
Team	Event	Opposition Score	Opposition Score	Opposition Score	Opposition Score	Rank	Opposition Score	Opposition Score	Rank
Malaysia men's	Men's tournament	Indonesia; L 2–12	Philippines; W 13–3	—N/a		2	Thailand; L 0–10	Myanmar; L 4–14	4
Malaysia women's	Women's tournament	Laos; W 8–6	Thailand; L 0–4	Indonesia; L 1–2	Philippines; W 11–1	2	Laos; L 0–2	Indonesia; W 3–0	3rd place, bronze medalist(s)

=== Men's tournament ===
==== Group B ====
Pos	Team	Pld	W	L	PF	PA	PD	Pts	Qualification
1	Indonesia (INA)	2	2	0	26	6	+20	4	Qualified for the Semifinals
2	Malaysia (MAS)	2	1	1	15	15	0	3	Qualified for the Semifinals
3	Philippines (PHI)	2	0	2	7	27	−20	2	

Source: APG 2023

4 June 2023; 13:00	Indonesia	12–2	Malaysia	Morodok Techo National Stadium

6 June 2023; 13:00	Malaysia	13–3	Philippines	Morodok Techo National Stadium

=== Women's tournament ===
==== Group Stage ====
Pos	Team	Pld	W	L	PF	PA	PD	Pts	Qualification
1	Thailand (THA)	4	4	0	25	4	+21	8	Qualified for the Semifinal
2	Malaysia (MAS)	4	2	2	20	13	+7	6	Qualified for the Semifinal
3	Laos (LAO)	4	2	2	22	19	+3	6	Qualified for the Semifinal
4	Indonesia (INA)	4	2	2	8	13	−5	6	Qualified for the Semifinal
5	Philippines (PHI)	4	0	4	9	35	−26	4	

Source: APG 2023

4 June 2023; 10:20	Laos	6–8	Malaysia	Morodok Techo National Stadium

5 June 2023; 10:20	Thailand	4–0	Malaysia	Morodok Techo National Stadium

5 June 2023; 13:00	Indonesia	2–1	Malaysia	Morodok Techo National Stadium

6 June 2023; 10:20	Malaysia	11–1	Philippines	Morodok Techo National Stadium

== Judo ==
Men

Athlete	Event	Group Stage					Quarterfinals	Semifinals	Final / BM	
Athlete	Event	Opposition Score	Opposition Score	Opposition Score	Opposition Score	Rank	Opposition Score	Opposition Score	Opposition Score	Rank
Mohd Khairul Azmi Abd Rahaman	J2 –60 kg	Tithvibol Leng (CAM); L 010–100	Yovan Rate Azis (INA); L 000–100	Bayu Pangestu Ajis (INA); L 000–100	Nguyen Viet Tu (VIE); L 000–100	—N/a				5
Muhammad Fatah Abu Bakar	J2 –73 kg	Den Lang (CAM); W 100–010	Sahrul Sulaiman (INA); W 100–000	—N/a						1st place, gold medalist(s)
Lee Chee Hock	J1 –90 kg	Fajar Pambudi (INA); L 000–100	Carlito Evangelista Agustin Jr (PHI); W 100–000	Kittikai Chaisin (THA); L 000–100	Huynh Tien Phat (VIE); W 100–000	—N/a				3rd place, bronze medalist(s)
Mohd Khairul Azmi Abd Rahaman; Muhammad Fatah Abu Bakar; Lee Chee Hock	Team	—N/a					Cambodia; W 2-1	Indonesia; L 0-2	Philippines; L 0-2	5

== Powerlifting ==
Men

Athlete	Event	Best lift	Rank	Total	Rank
Ahmad Shahmim Mohd Kadri	54 kg	116	5	226	5
Azlan Mos	59 kg	155	2nd place, silver medalist(s)	453	2nd place, silver medalist(s)
Bryan Junency Gustin	80 kg	183	2nd place, silver medalist(s)	530	2nd place, silver medalist(s)
Nicodemus Manggoi Moses	88 kg	205	1st place, gold medalist(s)	595	1st place, gold medalist(s)
Wan Nur Azri Wan Azman	97 kg	175	2nd place, silver medalist(s)	345	3rd place, bronze medalist(s)

Women

Athlete	Event	Best lift	Rank	Total	Rank
Bibiana Ahmad	67 kg	94	2nd place, silver medalist(s)	184	3rd place, bronze medalist(s)
Sona Agon	73 kg	95	4	185	4

== Swimming ==
Men

Athlete	Event	Final	
Athlete	Event	Result	Rank
Abd Halim Mohammad	50m breaststroke SB8	34.44	1st place, gold medalist(s)
Abd Halim Mohammad	100m breaststroke SB8	1:19.33	1st place, gold medalist(s)
Abd Halim Mohammad	50m freestyle S8	27.62	1st place, gold medalist(s)
Abd Halim Mohammad	100m freestyle S8	1:04.10	1st place, gold medalist(s)
Abd Halim Mohammad	200m individual medley SM8	2:48.41	1st place, gold medalist(s)
Abd Halim Mohammad	Team 4x100m medley relay 34 pts	5:00.81	3rd place, bronze medalist(s)
Bryan Lau Sze Kai	50m butterfly S14	27.06	2nd place, silver medalist(s)
Bryan Lau Sze Kai	100m butterfly S14	1:01.73	3rd place, bronze medalist(s)
Bryan Lau Sze Kai	50m freestyle S14	24.87	1st place, gold medalist(s)
Bryan Lau Sze Kai	100m freestyle S14	54.84	1st place, gold medalist(s)
Bryan Lau Sze Kai	200m freestyle S14	2:07.90	2nd place, silver medalist(s)
Bryan Lau Sze Kai	Team 4x100m medley relay S14	4:15.29	1st place, gold medalist(s)
Duran Yaspi Imam Basori	100m butterfly S14	1:02.03	4
Duran Yaspi Imam Basori	50m backstroke S14	31.01	2nd place, silver medalist(s)
Duran Yaspi Imam Basori	100m backstroke S14	1:07.70	3rd place, bronze medalist(s)
Duran Yaspi Imam Basori	50m breaststroke SB14	40.52	7
Duran Yaspi Imam Basori	100m breaststroke SB14	1:25.76	9
Ethan Khoo Yin Jun	100m backstroke S14	1:06.43	2nd place, silver medalist(s)
Ethan Khoo Yin Jun	50m freestyle S14	26.10	3rd place, bronze medalist(s)
Ethan Khoo Yin Jun	100m freestyle S14	56.96	2nd place, silver medalist(s)
Ethan Khoo Yin Jun	200m freestyle S14	2:03.85	1st place, gold medalist(s)
Ethan Khoo Yin Jun	200m individual medley SM14	2:26.22	3rd place, bronze medalist(s)
Ethan Khoo Yin Jun	Team 4x100m medley relay S14	4:15.29	1st place, gold medalist(s)
Fraidden Dawan	50m butterfly S10	30.81	3rd place, bronze medalist(s)
Fraidden Dawan	100m butterfly S10	1:09.27	1st place, gold medalist(s)
Fraidden Dawan	400m freestyle S10	4:52.60	1st place, gold medalist(s)
Fraidden Dawan	200m individual medley SM10	2:33.00	1st place, gold medalist(s)
Fraidden Dawan	Team 4x100m freestyle relay 34 pts	4:34.29	4
Fraidden Dawan	Team 4x100m medley relay 34 pts	5:00.81	3rd place, bronze medalist(s)
Jaflee Jikol	50m butterfly S9	32.82	8
Jaflee Jikol	100m freestyle S9	1:08.89	8
Jaflee Jikol	400m freestyle S9	5:32.48	6
Jaflee Jikol	200m individual medley SM9	3:00.15	5
Jaflee Jikol	Team 4x100m freestyle relay 34 pts	4:34.29	4
Jaflee Jikol	Team 4x100m medley relay 34 pts	5:00.81	3rd place, bronze medalist(s)
Mohd Adib Iqbal Abdullah	50m breaststroke SB14	32.17	1st place, gold medalist(s)
Mohd Adib Iqbal Abdullah	100m breaststroke SB14	1:09.54	1st place, gold medalist(s)
Mohd Adib Iqbal Abdullah	50m freestyle S14	26.99	5
Mohd Adib Iqbal Abdullah	100m freestyle S14	59.03	4
Mohd Adib Iqbal Abdullah	200m individual medley SM14	2:27.27	4
Mohd Adib Iqbal Abdullah	Team 4x100m medley relay S14	4:15.29	1st place, gold medalist(s)
Muhammad Imaan Aiman Muhammad Redzuan	50m butterfly S14	27.53	3rd place, bronze medalist(s)
Muhammad Imaan Aiman Muhammad Redzuan	100m butterfly S14	1:00.35	1st place, gold medalist(s)
Muhammad Imaan Aiman Muhammad Redzuan	50m backstroke S14	28.51	1st place, gold medalist(s)
Muhammad Imaan Aiman Muhammad Redzuan	100m backstroke S14	1:01.99	1st place, gold medalist(s)
Muhammad Imaan Aiman Muhammad Redzuan	200m individual medley SM14	2:27.12	2nd place, silver medalist(s)
Muhammad Imaan Aiman Muhammad Redzuan	Team 4x100m medley relay S14	4:15.29	1st place, gold medalist(s)
Muhammad Nur Syaiful Zulkafli	50m breaststroke SB4	46.96	1st place, gold medalist(s)
Muhammad Nur Syaiful Zulkafli	100m breaststroke SB4	1:50.38	3rd place, bronze medalist(s)
Muhammad Nur Syaiful Zulkafli	50m freestyle S5	33.23	1st place, gold medalist(s)
Muhammad Nur Syaiful Zulkafli	100m freestyle S5	1:15.65	1st place, gold medalist(s)
Muhammad Nur Syaiful Zulkafli	200m freestyle S5	2:55.43	3rd place, bronze medalist(s)
Muhammad Nur Syaiful Zulkafli	Team 4x100m freestyle relay 34 pts	4:34.29	4
Muhammad Nur Syaiful Zulkafli	Team 4x100m medley relay 34 pts	5:00.81	3rd place, bronze medalist(s)
Muhammad Zhafri Adam Mohd Azmi	50m breaststroke SB14	35.85	4
Muhammad Zhafri Adam Mohd Azmi	100m breaststroke SB14	1:22.38	6
Nik Muhammad Joe Asyraff Nik Rafizal	50m butterfly S14	28.80	5
Nik Muhammad Joe Asyraff Nik Rafizal	50m backstroke S14	32.72	6
Nik Muhammad Joe Asyraff Nik Rafizal	200m freestyle S14	2:15.66	4
Rusdianto Rusmadi	50m butterfly S8	30.69	2nd place, silver medalist(s)
Rusdianto Rusmadi	100m butterfly S8	1:10.10	1st place, gold medalist(s)
Rusdianto Rusmadi	100m butterfly S8	1:10.10	1st place, gold medalist(s)
Rusdianto Rusmadi	100m backstroke S8	1:20.47	2nd place, silver medalist(s)
Rusdianto Rusmadi	400m freestyle S8	5:50.54	2nd place, silver medalist(s)
Rusdianto Rusmadi	200m individual medley SM8	2:48.51	2nd place, silver medalist(s)
Zy Kher Lee	50m butterfly S5	47.51	6
Zy Kher Lee	100m breaststroke SB4	2:04.10	6
Zy Kher Lee	100m freestyle S5	1:20.14	4
Zy Kher Lee	200m freestyle S5	2:51.20	1st place, gold medalist(s)
Zy Kher Lee	200m individual medley SM5	3:32.57	1st place, gold medalist(s)

Women

Athlete	Event	Final	
Athlete	Event	Result	Rank
Brenda Anellia Larry	50 m backstroke S5	1:07.92	4
Brenda Anellia Larry	100m breaststroke SB4	2:33.95	2nd place, silver medalist(s)
Brenda Anellia Larry	50m freestyle S5	1:01.52	4
Brenda Anellia Larry	100m freestyle S5	2:18.77	2
Lim Carmen	50m breaststroke SB8	45.43	1st place, gold medalist(s)
Lim Carmen	100m breaststroke SB8	1:41.32	1st place, gold medalist(s)
Lim Carmen	50m freestyle S8	34.43	1st place, gold medalist(s)
Lim Carmen	100m freestyle S7-8	1:20.07	3rd place, bronze medalist(s)

== Table tennis ==
Men

Athlete	Event	Group Stage				Round 1/8	Semifinals	Final / BM	
Athlete	Event	Opposition Result	Opposition Result	Opposition Result	Rank	Opposition Result	Opposition Result	Opposition Result	Rank
Brady Zi Rong Chin	Singles TT9	Aman Suratman (INA); L 1–3 (4–11, 6–11, 11–9, 8–11)	Andrew Kevin Bauyon Arandia (PHI); L 0–3 (2–11, 9–11, 3–11)	Sukij Samee (THA); W 3–0 (11–3, 11–5, 11–6)	3	Did not advance			
Chee Chaoming	Singles TT9	Molchai Melanon (THA); W 3–0 (11–7, 11–5, 11–3)	Linard Combras Sultan (PHI); W 3–0 (11–8, 11–9, 11–9)	Hilmi Azizi (INA); W 3–0 (11–2, 11–7, 11–9)	1 Q	Andrew Kevin Bauyon Arandia (PHI); W 3–1 (6–11, 11–7, 11–5, 13–11)	Kusnanto (INA); L 0–3 (11–13, 1–11, 9–11)	Did not advance	3rd place, bronze medalist(s)
Jennahtul Fahmi Ahmad Jennah	Singles TT11	Khunanon Didsunon (THA); W 3–0 (11–5, 11–5, 11–6)	Muhammad Alfigo Dwiputra (INA); W 3–0 (11–9, 12–10, 11–5)	Dwi Hajiyanto (INA); W 3–0 (11–9, 11–7, 11–2)	1 Q	—N/a	Narawit Techo (THA); W 3–0 (11–7, 11–3, 11–6)	Muhammad Alfigo Dwiputra (INA); L 0–3 (8–11, 9–11, 7–11)	2nd place, silver medalist(s)
Brady Zi Rong Chin; Chee Chaoming	Doubles TT9	Benedicto Hernandez Guela / Linard Combras Sultan (PHI); W 3–0 (14–12, 11–4, 11–9)	Molchai Melanon / Sukij Samee (PHI); W 3–0 (11–9, 11–7, 11–7)	—N/a	1 Q	—N/a	Pham Minh Tuan / Pham The Tien (VIE); W 3–2 (11–4, 5–11, 8–11, 11–3, 11–9)	Molchai Melanon / Sukij Samee (PHI); W 3–0 (11–8, 11–7, 11–8)	1st place, gold medalist(s)
Brady Zi Rong Chin; Chee Chaoming	Team TT9	Indonesia; W 2–0	Philippines; W 2–0	—N/a					1st place, gold medalist(s)

Women

Athlete	Event	Group Stage				Round 1/8	Semifinals	Final / BM	
Athlete	Event	Opposition Result	Opposition Result	Opposition Result	Rank	Opposition Result	Opposition Result	Opposition Result	Rank
Gloria Gracia Wong Sze	Singles TT10	Sella Dwi Radayana (INA); L 0–3 (7–11, 8–11, 9–11)	Janisa Khompast (THA); W 3–0 (11–7, 11–6, 11–5)	Mary Eloise Langoban Sable (PHI); W 3–0 (11–5, 11–4, 11–2)	2 Q	—N/a	Intira Chapandung (THA); W 3–1 (8–11, 11–7, 11–8, 14–12)	Sella Dwi Radayana (INA); L 1–3 (7–11, 7–11, 11–9, 4–11)	2nd place, silver medalist(s)

Mixed

Athlete	Event	Group Stage				Round 1/8	Semifinals	Final / BM	
Athlete	Event	Opposition Result	Opposition Result	Opposition Result	Rank	Opposition Result	Opposition Result	Opposition Result	Rank
Chee Chaoming; Gloria Gracia Wong Sze	Doubles TT10	Bunpot Sillapakong / Intira Chapandung (THA); W 3–0 (11–6, 11–6, 11–6)	Cici Juliani / Hilmi Aziz (INA); W 3–0 (11–3, 11–9, 11–1)	Minnie De Ramos Cadag / Rommel Patombon Lucencio (PHI); W 3–0 (11–4, 11–6, 11–3)	1 Q	—N/a	Andrew Kevin Bauyon Arandia / Mary Eloise Langoban Sable (PHI); W 3–0 (11–5, 11–8, 11–9)	Komet Akbar / Sella Dwi Radayana (INA); L 2–3 (11–5, 11–8, 6–11, 6–11, 4–11)	2nd place, silver medalist(s)

== Wheelchair basketball ==
=== Men's ===
Team	Event	Group Stage					Final / BM	
Team	Event	Opposition Score	Opposition Score	Opposition Score	Opposition Score	Rank	Opposition Score	Rank
Malaysia men's	3x3 tournament	Thailand; L 12–18	Indonesia; W 11–9	Cambodia; W 12–6	Philippines; L 7–8	3	Cambodia; W 17–8	3rd place, bronze medalist(s)
Malaysia men's	5x5 tournament	Cambodia; W 91–34	Thailand; L 45–70	Indonesia; W 65–36	Philippines; L 31–50	3	Indonesia; W 74–40	3rd place, bronze medalist(s)

==== 3x3 tournament ====
Pos	Team	Pld	W	L	PF	PA	PD	Pts	Qualification
1	Thailand (THA)	4	4	0	70	31	+39	8	Qualified for the Gold medal match
2	Philippines (PHI)	4	3	1	39	35	+4	7	Qualified for the Gold medal match
3	Malaysia (MAS)	4	2	2	42	41	+1	6	Qualified for the Bronze medal match
4	Cambodia (CAM) (H)	4	1	3	29	50	−21	5	Qualified for the Bronze medal match
5	Indonesia (INA)	4	0	4	28	51	−23	4	

Source: APG 2023
(H) Hosts

June 2, 2023

Malaysia	12–18	Thailand

Morodok Techo National Stadium

June 2, 2023

Indonesia	9–11	Malaysia

Morodok Techo National Stadium

June 2, 2023

Malaysia	12–6	Cambodia

Morodok Techo National Stadium

June 2, 2023

Malaysia	7–8	Philippines

Morodok Techo National Stadium

==== Bronze medal match ====
June 3, 2023

Malaysia	17–8	Cambodia

Morodok Techo National Stadium

==== 5x5 tournament ====
Pos	Team	Pld	W	L	PF	PA	PD	Pts	Qualification
1	Thailand (THA)	4	4	0	313	121	+192	8	Qualified for the Gold medal match
2	Philippines (PHI)	4	3	1	237	177	+60	7	Qualified for the Gold medal match
3	Malaysia (MAS)	4	2	2	227	165	+62	6	Qualified for the Bronze medal match
4	Indonesia (INA)	4	1	3	162	268	−106	5	Qualified for the Bronze medal match
5	Cambodia (CAM) (H)	4	0	4	139	327	−188	4	

Source: APG 2023
(H) Hosts

June 4, 2023

Cambodia	34–91	Malaysia

Morodok Techo National Stadium

June 4, 2023

Malaysia	45–70	Thailand

Morodok Techo National Stadium

June 5, 2023

Malaysia	65–36	Indonesia

Morodok Techo National Stadium

June 6, 2023

Malaysia	31–50	Philippines

Morodok Techo National Stadium

Bronze medal match

10:30, June 7, 2023

Malaysia	74–40	Indonesia

Morodok Techo National Stadium
