= Singapore at the 2026 Asian Para Games =

- Flag of Singapore
- IPC code: SGP
- NPC: Singapore National Paralympic Council
- Website: www.snpc.org.sg

in Aichi-Nagoya, Japan 18 October 2026 – 24 October 2026
- Competitors: 20 (12 men and 8 women) in 9 sports
- Flag bearer (closing): TBD
- Medals Ranked 23rd: Gold 0 Silver 6 Bronze 5 Total 11

Asian Para Games appearances (overview)
- 2010; 2014; 2018; 2022; 2026

Singapore is participating in the 2026 Asian Para Games, in Nagoya, Aichi Prefecture, Japan, from 18 to 24 October 2026. This is Singapore's fifth appearance at the Games.

== Medalists ==
Medal	Athlete	Sport	Event	Date
(silver) Silver	Jovin Tan	Boccia	Men's Individual-BC1	21 October
(silver) Silver	Gan Aloysius	Boccia	Men's Individual-BC3	21 October
(silver) Silver	Nur Syahidah Alim	Archery	Compound Women	22 October
(silver) Silver	Toh Wei Soong	Swimming	Men's 100m Backstroke S7	22 October
(bronze) Bronze	Toh Wei Soong	Swimming	Men's 400m Freestyle S7	19 October
(bronze) Bronze	Toh Wei Soong	Swimming	Men's 100m Freestyle S7	20 October
(bronze) Bronze	Toh Wei Soong	Swimming	Men's 50m Butterfly S7	21 October
(bronze) Bronze	Jeralyn Tan	Boccia	Women's Individual-BC1	21 October
(bronze) Bronze	Tan Cheng Jui	Cycling	Women's B Time Trial	21 October

=== Summary ===
Medals by events
Sport	Gold	Silver	Bronze	Total
Boccia	0	3	1	4
Swimming	0	2	3	5
Archery	0	1	0	1
Cycling	0	0	1	1
Total	0	6	5	11

Medals by day
Day	Date	Gold	Silver	Bronze	Total
1	19 October	0	0	1	1
2	20 October	0	0	1	1
3	21 October	0	2	3	5
4	22 October	0	2	0	2
Total		0	4	5	9

Medals by gender
Gender	Gold	Silver	Bronze	Total
Female	0	1	2	3
Male	0	3	3	6
Mixed	0	0	0	0
Total	0	4	5	9

Multiple medalists
Athlete	Event	1st place, gold medalist(s)	2nd place, silver medalist(s)	3rd place, bronze medalist(s)	Total
Toh Wei Soong	Swimming		1	3	4

== Competitors ==
Following is the list of sports and number of athletes that will represent Singapore:

Sport	Men	Women	Total
Archery	-	1	1
Athletics	2	-	2
Badminton	1	-	1
Boccia	2	2	4
Cycling	2	1	3
Judo	-	1	1
Shooting	2	1	3
Swimming	2	2	4
Table tennis	1	-	1
Total	12	8	20

== Archery ==
Individual

Archer	Event	Ranking Round		Round of 16	Quarterfinals	Semi-finals	Final / BM	
Archer	Event	Score	Seed	Opposition Score	Opposition Score	Opposition Score	Opposition Score	Rank
Nur Syahidah Alim	Women's compound	683	2	Aitimova (KAZ); W 143–139	Seidan (KAZ); W 143–139	Xu (CHN); W 145–144	Devi (IND); L 139–142	2nd place, silver medalist(s)

== Athletics ==
Track events

Athlete	Event	Class	Heat		Final	
Athlete	Event	Class	Result	Rank	Result	Rank
James Ang	Men's 400 m	T13	23 Oct			

Field events

Athlete	Event	Class	Qualification		Final	
Athlete	Event	Class	Result	Rank	Result	Rank
Muhammad Diroy	Men's shot put	F40	—N/a		8.82 SB	5

== Badminton ==
Athlete	Event	Group stage				Round of 16	Quarterfinals	Semifinals	Final	
Athlete	Event	Opposition Score	Opposition Score	Opposition Score	Rank	Opposition Score	Opposition Score	Opposition Score	Opposition Score	Rank
Tay Wei Ming	Men's singles SU5	Ahmad Sibi (MAS); W 2–1 (12-21, 21-19, 21-12)	Lee J-s (KOR); L 0–2 (13-21, 17-21)	Makkar (IND); L 0–2 (19-21, 7-21)	3	Did not advance				

== Boccia ==
Athlete	Event	Group stage					Quarterfinals	Semifinals	Final	
Athlete	Event	Opposition Score	Opposition Score	Opposition Score	Opposition Score	Rank	Opposition Score	Opposition Score	Opposition Score	Rank
Jovin Tan	Men's Individual BC1	Luo (CHN); W 8–0	Askarbekov (KAZ); W 5–3	—N/a		1 Q	Chan (HKG); W 4–2	Loung (HKG); W 6–2	Huadpradit (THA); W 1–4	2nd place, silver medalist(s)
Gan Aloysius	Men's Individual BC3	Chang (TPE); W 6–2	Chanthakhat (THA); W 3–2	Tse (HKG); W 5–1	—N/a	1 Q	—N/a	Jeong (KOR); W 4^{1}–4^{0}	Chanthakhat (THA); L 3–4	2nd place, silver medalist(s)
Jeralyn Tan	Women's Individual BC1	Ghayebi (IRI); L 1–8	Chanyadi (THA); W 3–1	Leung (HKG); W 6–1	Endo (JPN); W 4^{1}–4^{0}	2 Q	—N/a	Melissa (MAS); L 0–8	Ghayebi (IRI); W 6–1	3rd place, bronze medalist(s)
Nurulasyiqah Mohammad	Women's Individual BC3	Yang (CHN); L 3–6	Sakai (JPN); W 4–1	Devi (IND); L 2–3	Choi (KOR); W 6–3	3	Did not advance			
Gan Aloysious Nurulasyiqah Mohammad	Mixed Pairs BC3	India; W 5–2	Chinese Taipei; W 5^{1}–5^{0}	Hong Kong; 23 Oct	—N/a	Q	—N/a			

== Cycling ==
Men

Athlete	Event	Qualifying round		Final	
Athlete	Event	Timing	Rank	Timing	Rank
Muhammad Nur Amsyar Abdemanaf	Men's H1-5 Time Trial	—N/a		41:36.49	10
Muhammad Nur Amsyar Abdemanaf	Men's H4-5 Road Race	—N/a		−4LAP	5
Sebastian Adrian Tan Yan Zhi	Men's T1-2 Time Trial	—N/a		32:49.25	8
Sebastian Adrian Tan Yan Zhi	Men's T1-2 Road Race	—N/a		−2LAP	8

Women

Athlete	Event	Qualifying round		Final	
Athlete	Event	Timing	Rank	Timing	Rank
Tan Cheng Jui	Women's B Time Trial	—N/a		34:31.92	3rd place, bronze medalist(s)
Tan Cheng Jui	Women's B Road Race	23 Oct			

== Judo ==
Women

Athlete	Event	Round of 16	Quarterfinal	Semifinal	Repechage	Final / BM	
Athlete	Event	Opposition Result	Opposition Result	Opposition Result	Opposition Result	Opposition Result	Rank
Joan Hung Hui Xin	J2 -60 kg	—N/a	Wang (CHN); L 000–112^{IPP}	—N/a		Fedossova (KAZ); L 000–101^{IPP}	5

== Shooting ==
Men

Athlete	Event	Qualification		Final	
Athlete	Event	Score	Rank	Score	Rank
Chan Han Siong	P1 10m Air Pistol SH1	571	4Q	150.1	6
Chan Han Siong	P3 Open 25m Pistol SH1	23 Oct			
Surya Mohan Jha	R3 10m Air Rifle Prone SH1	625.1	18	Did not advance	

Women

Athlete	Event	Qualification		Final	
Athlete	Event	Score	Rank	Score	Rank
Theresa Goh Rui Si	P2 10m Air Pistol SH1	534	18	Did not advance	

== Swimming ==
Men

Athlete	Event	Heat		Final	
Athlete	Event	Result	Rank	Result	Rank
Toh Wei Soong	100 m backstroke S7	22 Oct			
Wong Zhi Wei	100 m breaststroke SB13	1:15.48	3 Q	1:13.50	4
Toh Wei Soong	50 m butterfly S7	—N/a		21 Oct	
Toh Wei Soong	50 m freestyle S7	23 Oct			
Wong Zhi Wei	50 m freestyle S13	22 Oct			
Toh Wei Soong	100 m freestyle S7	—N/a		1:05.33	3rd place, bronze medalist(s)
Wong Zhi Wei	100 m freestyle S13	—N/a		58.55	4
Toh Wei Soong	400 m freestyle S7	—N/a		5:24.23	3rd place, bronze medalist(s)
Wong Zhi Wei	400 m freestyle S13	—N/a		4:38.19	4
Wong Zhi Wei	200 m individual medley SM13			23 Oct	

Women

Athlete	Event	Heat		Final	
Athlete	Event	Result	Rank	Result	Rank
Sophie Soon Jin Wen	100 m Freestyle S13	—N/a		1:20.45	6
Sophie Soon Jin Wen	100 m Breaststroke SB13	—N/a		1:33.93	6
Sophie Soon Jin Wen	100 m Backstroke S13	—N/a		1:25.45	6
Sophie Soon Jin Wen	50 m Freestyle S13	—N/a		32.97	6
Danielle Moi Yan Ting	100 m Butterfly S14	1:12.33	4Q	1:12.95	8

== Table Tennis ==
Singles

Player	Event	Group stage					Quarter-finals	Semi-finals	Final	
Player	Event	Opposition Score	Opposition Score	Opposition Score	Opposition Score	Rank	Opposition Score	Opposition Score	Opposition Score	Rank
Rodrick Ll	Men's C2	Park (KOR); L 0–3	Thinathet (THA); W 3–2	—N/a			Kim H-u (KOR); L 0–3	Did not advance		
