= Blind football at the 2023 ASEAN Para Games =

- Venue: Hockey Stadium, Morodok Techo National Sports Complex
- Location: Phnom Penh, Cambodia
- Dates: 4 June – 8 June 2023
- Nations: 4

Blind football (Football 5-a-side) at the 2023 ASEAN Para Games was held at the Hockey Stadium of Morodok Techo National Sports Complex in Phnom Penh, Cambodia, from 4 to 8 June 2023.

== Medalists ==
| Event | Gold | Silver | Bronze |
|---|---|---|---|
| Men's team | Thailand (THA); Satayu Wannit; Wanchana Pradapsri; Panyawut Kupan; Prakrong Buayai; Ronnarod Phuna; Sanan Phetkrachangsuk; Thanawit Chuenta; Phichitchai Somboonsak; Ponchai Kasikonudompaisan | Malaysia (MAS); Muhamad Azuan Abdul Rasiad; Mohd Azwan Azhar; Rollen Marakim; Ahmad Fikri Omar; Mohd Al Hakim Norddin; Mohd Azuwan Atan; Sulaiman Nor Azizan; Muhammad Rafique Farhan Saiful; Luqman Hakim Mohd Sukri; Meor Shahrul Azha Mat Salleh | Laos (LAO); Khamphasouk Sonesenghak; Mayxao Mounkhoun; Vilaysone Xaiyavong; Sengphet Phothilak; Bounhome Douangbounxay; Somsak Douangvilay; Bounchob Vanephengphanh; Suphanthamath Symon; Phanthaly Sanphet; Xaynakhone Piyavong |

== Result ==
=== Group stage ===
| Pos | Team | Pld | W | D | L | GF | GA | GD | Pts | Qualified for |
|---|---|---|---|---|---|---|---|---|---|---|
| 1 | Thailand | 3 | 3 | 0 | 0 | 11 | 1 | +10 | 9 | Gold medal match |
| 2 | Malaysia | 3 | 2 | 0 | 1 | 5 | 3 | +2 | 6 | Gold medal match |
| 3 | Laos | 3 | 1 | 0 | 2 | 3 | 6 | −3 | 3 | Bronze medal match |
| 4 | Cambodia | 3 | 0 | 0 | 3 | 2 | 11 | −9 | 0 | Bronze medal match |

4 June
17:00

| Cambodia | 0-3 | Laos |

Hockey Stadium
4 June
19:00

| Malaysia | 0-2 | Thailand |

Hockey Stadium
5 June
17:00

| Laos | 0-3 | Malaysia |

Hockey Stadium
5 June
19:00

| Cambodia | 1-6 | Thailand |

Hockey Stadium
6 June
17:00

| Cambodia | 1-2 | Malaysia |

Hockey Stadium
6 June
19:00

| Laos | 0-3 | Thailand |

Hockey Stadium

=== Bronze medal match ===
8 June
16:30

| Cambodia | 0-4 | Laos |

Hockey Stadium

=== Gold medal match ===
8 June
18:00

| Thailand | 4-0 | Malaysia |

Hockey Stadium
