= CP football at the 2023 ASEAN Para Games =

Football 7-a-side at the 2023 ASEAN Para Games
- Venue: Olympic Stadium
- Location: Phnom Penh, Cambodia
- Dates: 4 June – 8 June 2023

CP football at the 2023 ASEAN Para Games was held at the Olympic Stadium, Phnom Penh from 4 to 8 June 2023.

== Medal summary ==
Rank	Nation	Gold	Silver	Bronze	Total
1	Malaysia (MAS)	1	0	0	1
2	Indonesia (INA)	0	1	0	1
3	Thailand (THA)	0	0	1	1
Totals (3 entries)		1	1	1	3

== Medalists ==
Event	Gold	Silver	Bronze
Men	Malaysia (MAS); Ahmad Farihan Kassim; Muhammad Khairi Ismail; Muhamad Firdaus Bakar; Mohd Farissan Jasnal; Khairulnizam Engkeh; Adray Uzair Abu Bakar; Ahmad Azizan Aziz; Nasveer Singh; Muhammad Uthman Surur; Noor Muhammad Ariff Yusoff; Muhamad Shafiq Zahari; Mohamad Sobri Ghazali; Muhammad Syukri Abdul Razak; Abdullah Reduan Abdul Samat	Indonesia (INA); Abdul Aziz Nur; Achmad Syafrudin; Ahmad Yuliarsi; Ahmad Yusuf; Amin Rosyid; Ammar Hudzaifah; Cahyana; Diky Hendrawan; Mahdianur; Muhammad Ikhsan Tabrani; Muhammad Ridhani; Yahya Hernanda; Yahya Muhaimi; Yusup Suhendar	Thailand (THA); Bannasak Nuepho; Chaiphon Thammawichai; Aphiwat Saito; Phonpipat Nampaksa; Narongchai Thaohong; Siwadol Katanyutawong; Sukhitkun Bunsing; Chanatip Deeman; Jettarin Wonghangmit; Attan Tahe; Thanachok Sirivat; Sedthawut Saengma; Nimitr Kaisakaew; Natthapong Glaharn

== Group stage ==
The group stage was held in round-robin format, where the participating six teams are divided into two groups of three teams.

=== Group A ===
Pos	Team	Pld	W	D	L	GF	GA	GD	Pts	Qualified for
1	Indonesia	2	2	0	0	13	1	+12	6	Team play for position 1
2	Malaysia	2	1	0	1	6	8	−2	3	Team play for position 1
3	Cambodia	2	0	0	2	3	13	−10	0	Team play for the position 5

4 June
18:00

Cambodia	0-8	Indonesia

Olympic Stadium
Referee: Daniel Wong
5 June
16:00

Indonesia	5-1	Malaysia

Olympic Stadium
Referee: Hor Bunthong
6 June
16:00

Malaysia	5-3	Cambodia

Olympic Stadium
Referee: Ananthip Phophan

=== Group B ===
Pos	Team	Pld	W	D	L	GF	GA	GD	Pts	Qualified for
1	Thailand	2	2	0	0	16	2	+14	6	Team play for position 1
2	Myanmar	2	1	0	1	13	6	+7	3	Team play for position 1
3	Philippines	2	0	0	2	4	25	−21	0	Team play for the position 5

4 June
16:00

Thailand	3-1	Myanmar

Olympic Stadium
5 June
18:00

Myanmar	12-3	Philippines

Olympic Stadium
Referee: Mey Sreymeas
6 June
18:00

Philippines	1-13	Thailand

Olympic Stadium
Referee: Sokhom Samphors

== Knockout stage ==
Semi-finals
7 June – Phnom Penh
Indonesia	5
Myanmar	1
7 June – Phnom Penh
Thailand	7
Malaysia	8

Gold medal match
8 June – Phnom Penh
Indonesia	0 (1)
Malaysia	0 (3)
Bronze medal match
8 June – Phnom Penh
Myanmar	2
Thailand	3

=== Fifth place playoff ===
7 June
16:00

Cambodia	4-2	Philippines

Olympic Stadium
Referee: Hak Da

=== Semi-final ===
7 June
18:00

Indonesia	5-1	Myanmar

Olympic Stadium
Referee: Sum Viyoura
7 June
20:00

Thailand	7-8	Malaysia

Olympic Stadium
Referee: Daniel Wong

=== Bronze medal match ===
8 June
16:00

Myanmar	2-3	Thailand

Olympic Stadium
Referee: Hor Bunthong

=== Final ===
8 June
18:00

Indonesia	0-0 (a.e.t.)	Malaysia
Penalties
	1–3

Olympic Stadium
Referee: Daniel Wong
