= Polo in the Philippines =

- Country: Philippines
- Governing body: Philippine National Federation of Polo Players
- National team: Philippine national polo team
- First played: 1900s

Polo is a sport mainly played by the elite in the Philippines and was introduced in the country by the Americans.

== History ==
Polo was introduced in the Philippines during the United States colonial administration of the islands. Governor General William Cameron Forbes is credited for building the Forbes Park, the first polo field in the Philippines and establishing the Manila Polo Club in 1909. Polo has only been accessible to the Filipino elite and senior military officers. Since then, the sport has been proliferated by rich influential families such as the Elizalde and Zobel families and political families such as the Romeros.

== National team ==
The Philippines national polo team is organized and controlled by the Philippine National Federation of Polo Players (PNFPP), an associate member of the Philippine Olympic Committee since 2020. It has competed in the 2019 SEA Games where it won a silver and a bronze, and at the 2020 All Asia Cup where it finished as runners-up. The team will compete at the 2025 SEA Games in Thailand.

== Polo fields ==
- Iñigo Zobel Field – Calatagan, Batangas
- Miguel Romero Field – Calatagan, Batangas

== See also ==
- Philippine National Federation of Polo Players
- United Polo Players Association
