= Zy Kher Lee =

Malaysian para swimmer (born 2006)

Zy Kher Lee 李克
Personal information
- Nationality: Malaysian
- Born: 30 September 2006 (age 19) Penang, Malaysia

Sport
- Sport: Para swimming
- Disability class: S5
Medal record
Event	1st	2nd	3rd
Asian Para Games	0	0	2
Asian Youth Para Games	1	1	1
ASEAN Para Games	3	0	1
Total	4	1	4
Men's paralympic swimming
Representing Thailand
ASEAN Para Games
Bronze medal – third place	2025 Nakhon Ratchasima	100 m freestyle S5
Representing Malaysia
Asian Para Games
Bronze medal – third place	2022 Hangzhou	100m breaststroke SB4
Bronze medal – third place	2022 Hangzhou	200m freestyle S5
Asian Youth Para Games
Gold medal – first place	2021 Manama	200m freestyle S1–5
Silver medal – second place	2021 Manama	50m butterfly S2–7
Bronze medal – third place	2021 Manama	200m ind. medley SM5–10
ASEAN Para Games
Gold medal – first place	2023 Cambodia	200m individual medley SM5
Gold medal – first place	2023 Cambodia	200m freestyle S5
Mixed paralympic swimming
Representing Thailand
ASEAN Para Games
Gold medal – first place	2025 Nakhon Ratchasima	4×50 m medley relay 20 pts

Zy Kher Lee

Chinese name
- Traditional Chinese: 李克
- Hanyu Pinyin: Lǐ Kè
- Jyutping: Lei5 Hak1
- Hokkien POJ: Lí Khek

Zy Kher Lee (Chinese: 李克; pinyin: Lǐ Kè; Jyutping: Lei5 Hak1; Pe̍h-ōe-jī: Lí Khek; born 30 September 2006) is a Malaysian-born Thai Para swimming athlete.

== Career ==
He competed at the 2021 Asian Youth Para Games in swimming events won get three medals.

== Personal life ==
He is a student of Chung Ling High School.
