= Tchoukball Association of the Philippines =

Tchoukball association of Philippines

- Sport: Tchoukball
- Jurisdiction: Philippines
- Abbreviation: TAP
- Founded: 2014
- Headquarters: Bacolod
- Coach: John Elray Jamelo

Official website
- tchoukballphils.org
- (Philippines)

The Tchoukball Association of the Philippines (TAP) is the sports governing body for tchoukball in the Philippines.

== History ==
The Tchoukball Association of the Philippines (TAP) was established in 2014 to promote the sport of tchoukball in the Philippines. According to the Bacolod-based organization, the sport was introduced in the country.

It would acquire full membership in the International Tchoukball Federation (FITB), an active membership in the Asia Pacific Tchoukball Federation (APTBF), and the Southeast Asia Tchoukball Federation.

TAP would send both a men's and women's team at the 2017 World Beach Tchoukball Championships in Kaohsiung, Taiwan. Both sides finished among the top ten in their respective divisions.

In 2018, TAP became a member of the Philippine Olympic Committee TAP would take part in the 2019 World Tchoukball Championships in Malaysia.

The national teams would be placed under hiatus due to the COVID-19 pandemic in 2020. Tchoukball would return via the men's team participation in the 2022 Asia-Pacific Tchoukball Championship in Johor, Malaysia where it clinched qualification for the 2023 World Tchoukball Championships to be held in Prague, Czech Republic. However they were forced to withdraw due to financial issues.

== Tournaments ==
TAP organizes the National Tchoukball Championships in the Philippines for both men and women.

== National team record ==
=== World Championships ===
==== Men ====
Year	Round	Pld	W	D	L	GF	GA
(Malaysia) 2019	9th place	6	4	0	2	358	297
(Czech Republic) 2023	Withdrew						

==== Women ====
Year	Round	Pld	W	D	L	GF	GA
(Malaysia) 2019	Did not enter						

=== World Beach Championships ===
==== Men ====
Year	Round	Pld	W	D	L	GF	GA
(Chinese Taipei) 2017	7th place	7	4	0	3	300	274

==== Women ====
Year	Round	Pld	W	D	L	GF	GA
(Malaysia) 2017	6th place	4	0	0	4	114	151
