= United Polo Players Association =

Governing body of polo in the Philippines

- Sport: Polo
- Jurisdiction: Philippines
- Abbreviation: UPPA
- Founded: 2018
- President: Toti Garcia
- Chairman: Mikee Romero
- (Philippines)

The United Polo Players Association (UPPA) is a local governing body for the sport of Polo in the Philippines. UPPA was founded in 2018 after giving nod by the Philippine Olympic Committee officials to host an international polo event in the country.

It is currently headed by its chairman, 1-Pacman Partylist Representative and GlobalPort Batang Pier team owner Mikee Romero and President Toti Garcia, son of former Philippine Sports Commission chairman Richie Garcia.
