= Wong Zhi Wei =

Singaporean para-swimmer

Personal information
- Full name: Wong Zhi Wei
- Nationality: Singaporean
- Born: 28 June 2002 (age 24)
- Height: 175 cm (5 ft 9 in)
- Weight: 70 kg (154 lb)

Sport
- Sport: Swimming
- Strokes: Freestyle, Butterfly, Breastroke
- Classifications: S13/SB13/SM13
Medal record
Men's Para swimming
Representing Singapore
| Event | 1st | 2nd | 3rd |
|---|---|---|---|
| ASEAN Para Games | 3 | 4 | 3 |
| Asian Youth Para Games | 3 | 2 | 0 |
| Pan Pacific Para Swimming Championships | 0 | 1 | 0 |
| Total | 6 | 7 | 3 |

Wong Zhi Wei (Chinese: 黄智伟; pinyin: Huáng Zhìwěi; born 28 June 2002) is a Singaporean freestyle, butterfly, and breastroke para-swimmer. In 2017, at the 2017 Asian Youth Para Games held in Dubai, United Arab Emirates, Wong won the first gold medal for Singapore, and subsequently went on to become the most bemedaled Singaporean athlete at the games.

In 2019, Wong was diagnosed with Stage 5 Chronic kidney disease (CKD) and received a kidney transplant in 2020. Returning to sport in 2021, Wong participated in and won gold medals at the 2022 ASEAN Para Games held in Surakarta, Indonesia, as well as at the 2023 ASEAN Para Games held in Phnom Penh, Cambodia.

== Early life and education ==
Wong is blind in his right eye and has 6/60 vision in his left. The youngest of three children, he studied at Catholic High School and Eunoia Junior College, and graduated in 2020 after completing the Singapore-Cambridge GCE Advanced Level.

In 2021, Wong studied Psychology at the National University of Singapore (NUS) and graduated with a Bachelor of Social Science in Psychology with Honours (Distinction) in 2026.

== Swimming career ==
Wong started swimming competitively at the age of 13. In 2017, he joined ART Aquatics under the Singapore National Para-Swimming Team and met his current coach, Roland Tan.

=== ASEAN Para Games ===
At the 2017 ASEAN Para Games held in Kuala Lumpur, Malaysia, out of his 3 events, Wong won one silver medal in the Men's S13 100-metre Freestyle and one bronze medal in the Men's S13 50-metre Freestyle.

At the 2022 ASEAN Para Games held in Surakarta, Indonesia, Wong won two gold medals for Singapore in the Men's S13 50-metre and 100-metre Freestyle, as well as a silver medal in the Men's S13 100-metres Breastroke, becoming the most bemedaled Singaporean athlete at the games.

At the 2023 ASEAN Para Games held in Phnom Penh, Cambodia, Wong won one gold medal, two silver medals, and two bronze medals for Singapore over 5 events, setting a new Games Records in the Men's S13 100-metre Butterfly.

=== Asian Youth Para Games ===
At the 2017 Asian Youth Para Games held in Dubai, United Arab Emirates, Wong won the first gold medal for Singapore in the Men's S13 100-metre Butterfly. Wong would later win two more gold medals in the Men's S13 100-metre Freestyle and 400-metre Freestyle, becoming the most bemedaled Singaporean athlete at the games with three gold medals and two silver medals.

=== Asian Para Games ===
At the 2018 Asian Para Games held in Jakarta, Indonesia, Wong broke two national records in the Men's S13 100-metre Butterfly and 200-metre Individual Medley.

At the 2022 Asian Para Games held in Hangzhou, China, Wong was chosen as Singapore's flag bearer. He competed in a total of 5 events, placing 6th and breaking the national record in the Men's S13 50-metre Freestyle.

At the 2026 Asian Para Games held in Aichi-Nagoya, Japan, Wong competed in a total of 5 events, placing 4th in the Men's S13 400-metre Freestyle and Men's S13 100-metre Breastroke respectively. He also participated in the Men's S13 50-metre Freestyle, and Men's S13 200-metre Individual Medley, breaking the national record for Singapore in 4 out of 5 events except for the Men's S13 100-metre Freestyle.

=== Commonwealth Games ===
At the 2026 Commonwealth Games held in Glasgow, Scotland, Wong became a finalist in the Men's S13 100-metre Freestyle and 50-metre Freestyle events, finishing in 6th and 7th respectively.

== Honours ==
- Singapore Disability Sports Award, Sportsboy of the Year: 2023
- Goh Chok Tong Enable Awards (GCTEA), Promise Award: 2019
