= Nguyễn Văn Phúc =

Vietnamese Paralympic powerlifter

Personal information
- Born: October 6, 1981 (age 44) Ho Chi Minh City, Vietnam

Sport
- Country: Vietnam
- Sport: Powerlifting
Medal record
Powerlifting
Representing Vietnam
Asian Para Games
Bronze medal – third place	2018 Jakarta	59kg

Nguyễn Văn Phúc (born 6 October 1981) is a Vietnamese male Paralympic powerlifter. He was bronze medalist at the 2018 Asian Para Games in the 59 kg category.
