= CP football at the 2025 ASEAN Para Games =

CP Football at the 2025 ASEAN Para Games
- Venue: Nakhon Ratchasima Rajabhat University
- Location: Nakhon Ratchasima, Thailand
- Dates: 19–25 January 2026
- Nations: 5

CP football at the 2025 ASEAN Para Games was held at the Nakhon Ratchasima Rajabhat University in Nakhon Ratchasima, Thailand from 19 to 25 January 2026.

== Medal summary ==
* Host nation (Thailand)

Rank	Nation	Gold	Silver	Bronze	Total
1	Thailand (THA)*	1	0	0	1
2	Myanmar (MYA)	0	1	0	1
3	Indonesia (INA)	0	0	1	1
Totals (3 entries)		1	1	1	3

== Medalists ==
Event	Gold	Silver	Bronze
Men	Thailand (THA); Sukhitkun Bunsing; Chanatip Deeman; Nimitr Kaisakaew; Phonpipat Nampaksa; Bannasak Nuepho; Oakkharadet Ouanmahong; Teerasak Pongnok; Paisan Saechao; Thanachok Sirivat; Mongkholchai Sittisuwankul; Attan Tahe; Narongchai Thaohong; Chaiphon Thammawichai; Jettarin Wonghangmit	Myanmar (MYA); Aung Nge; Hein Htet Aung; Hein Htet San; Kaung Kyaw Khant; Kaung Myat Naing; Nay Thu Rein; Than Htut Win; Thet Paing Zaw; Wai Yan Min; Wai Yan Min Tun; Zaw Nyi Nyi Maung; Zin Thet Paing	Indonesia (INA); Diky Hendrawan; Yahya Hernanda; Eko Riski Khanani; Mahdianur; Yahya Muhaimi; Rizki Mulyana; Devan Ganendra Casey Raider; Amin Rosyid; Dany Priyo Sejati; Yusup Suhendar; Giri Suseno; Muhammad Ikhsan Tabrani; Hafthah Hans Linduadi Wicaksono; Ahmad Yusup

== Group stage ==
Pos	Team	Pld	W	D	L	GF	GA	GD	Pts	Qualification
1	Myanmar	4	3	1	0	30	4	+26	10	Gold medal match
2	Thailand (H)	4	2	2	0	29	3	+26	8	Gold medal match
3	Indonesia	4	2	1	1	20	4	+16	7	Bronze medal match
4	Malaysia	4	1	0	3	24	14	+10	3	Bronze medal match
5	Philippines	4	0	0	4	1	79	−78	0	

Source: Thailand 2025
(H) Hosts
19 January 2026
15:00

Indonesia	3–0	Malaysia
Hernanda 4', 53'; Mulyana 60+2'	Report

Nakhon Ratchasima Rajabhat University, Nakhon Ratchasima
19 January 2026
18:00

Philippines	0–19	Thailand
	Report	Mongkholchai 2', 12', 15', 34', 50'; Phonpipat 5', 28', 32', 41'; Bannasak 8', 10', 22'; Paisan 25'; Chanatip 57'; Chaiphon 58', 64'; Nimitr 59', 60', 63'

Nakhon Ratchasima Rajabhat University, Nakhon Ratchasima
21 January 2026
15:00

Myanmar	2–2	Thailand
Zaw Nyi Nyi Maung 40'; Wai Yan Min 60+2'	Report	Phonpipat 22', 57'

Nakhon Ratchasima Rajabhat University, Nakhon Ratchasima
21 January 2026
18:00

Indonesia	15–1	Philippines
Tabrani 1', 25', 26', 28'; Khanani 4', 23'; Hendrawan 7'; Suseno 21', 30+1'; Sejati 35', 54', 58'; Mahdianurn 50'; Wicaksono 55'; Mulyana 55'	Report	Dacera 49'

Nakhon Ratchasima Rajabhat University, Nakhon Ratchasima
22 January 2026
15:00

Indonesia	1–1	Thailand
Thanachok 44' (o.g.)	Report	Chanatip 33'

Nakhon Ratchasima Rajabhat University, Nakhon Ratchasima
22 January 2026
18:00

Myanmar	4–1	Malaysia
Kaung Kyaw Khant 5'; Zin Thet Paing 12'; Wai Yan Min 18', 57'	Report	Abu Bakar 10'

Nakhon Ratchasima Rajabhat University, Nakhon Ratchasima
23 January 2026
15:00

Myanmar	22–0	Philippines
Zaw Nyi Nyi Maung 1', 2', 3', 5', 6', 10', 19', 21', 31', 33'; Zin Thet Paing 8'; Kaung Kyaw Khant 11', 14'; Hein Htet San 24', 37', 40', 42'; Wai Yan Min Tun 48', 49', 60'; Hein Htet Aung 55'; Kaung Myat Naing 59'	Report

Nakhon Ratchasima Rajabhat University, Nakhon Ratchasima
23 January 2026
18:00

Malaysia	0–7	Thailand
	Report	Chanatip 1', 6', 16', 36'; Phonpipat 9', 21', 30+2'

Nakhon Ratchasima Rajabhat University, Nakhon Ratchasima
24 January 2026
15:00

Philippines	0–23	Malaysia
	Report	Mohammed Kassim 2', 21', 22', 30+2'; Abu Bakar 4', 10', 11', 27', 30+3', 44', 52', 53', 55', 58'; Thaker Singh 8', 22', 28'; Abd Samat 24'; Jasnal 31', 37', 38'; Ismail 42'; Mahzan 57'

Nakhon Ratchasima Rajabhat University, Nakhon Ratchasima
24 January 2026
18:00

Myanmar	2–1	Indonesia
Wai Yan Min Tun 37', 53'	Report	Tabrani 7'

Nakhon Ratchasima Rajabhat University, Nakhon Ratchasima

== Bronze medal match ==
25 January 2026
15:00

Indonesia	7–0	Malaysia
Tabrani 6', 11'; Wicaksono 9'; Mulyana 15', 31', 34'; Sejati 42'	Report

Nakhon Ratchasima Rajabhat University, Nakhon Ratchasima

== Gold medal match ==
25 January 2026
18:00

Thailand	1–0	Myanmar
Chanatip 51'	Report

Nakhon Ratchasima Rajabhat University, Nakhon Ratchasima

== Ranking ==
Rank	Team	M	W	D	L	GF	GA	GD	Points
1	Thailand	5	3	2	0	30	3	+27	11
2	Myanmar	5	3	1	1	30	5	+25	10
3	Indonesia	5	3	1	1	27	4	+23	10
4	Malaysia	5	1	0	4	24	21	+3	3
5	Philippines	4	0	0	4	1	79	-78	0
