= Philippine Flying Disc Association =

- Sport: Frisbee sports
- Jurisdiction: Philippines
- Abbreviation: PFDA
- Affiliation: WFDF
- Headquarters: Quezon City, Metro Manila
- President: Princess Trinidad
- Secretary: Junthir Flores

Official website
- phflyingdisc.com
- (Philippines)

The Philippine Flying Disc Association (PDFA; Filipino: Asosasyon ng Philippine Flying Disc) is the national sports association for Ultimate frisbee and other flying disc sports in the Philippines since 2002.

It was formerly known as the Philippine Ultimate Association (PUA).

== Tournaments ==
The PDFA organizes the Manila Spirits, an international Ultimate frisbee tournament which had its first edition in 2003. The Philippines and Singapore is noted in 2007 as the only other Asian country other than Japan to organize flying disc leagues at a level similar to North American cities.

== National teams ==
The PDFA has been organizing men's, women's and mixed national teams for various international open tournaments. The Pilipinas Ultimate sides have participated at the Asia-Oceanic Ultimate Championships in 2015, 2019, 2023, and 2025 with the mixed team taking part in all four editions.

PDFA sent a delegation to the mixed-team flying disc event at the 2025 SEA Games in Thailand where the sport is a demonstration event. They won a gold medal.
