= 2023 ASEAN Para Games =

Multi-sport event in Phnom Penh, Cambodia

XII ASEAN Para Games
- Host city: Phnom Penh, Cambodia
- Motto: Sports Live in Peace (Khmer: កីឡារស់ក្នុងសន្តិភាព)
- Nations: 11
- Athletes: 1,453
- Events: 439 in 12 sports
- Opening: 3 June
- Closing: 9 June
- Opened by: Hun Sen; Prime Minister of Cambodia
- Athlete's Oath: TBA
- Torch lighter: Sinet An
- Main venue: Morodok Techo National Stadium
- Website: www.cambodia2023.com

The 2023 ASEAN Para Games, officially known as the 12th ASEAN Para Games, and commonly known as Cambodia 2023, was an biennial Southeast Asian multi-sport event for athletes with disabilities held from 3 to 9 June 2023 in Phnom Penh, Cambodia. It was the first time that Cambodia hosted the ASEAN Para Games. Celebrated in the tradition of the ASEAN Para Games as governed by the ASEAN Para Sports Federation (APSF).

== Venues ==
Venue	Event
Morodok Techo Sports Complex
National Stadium	Ceremonies, Athletics
Aquatic Center	Swimming
Badminton Hall	Badminton
Basketball Hall	Boccia
Elephant Hall 1	Sitting volleyball
Elephant Hall 2	Wheelchair basketball
Hockey Stadium	Blind football
Table Tennis Hall	Table tennis
Other Phnom Penh venues
Federation of Youth Hall	Judo
Nagaworld 2 Hotel	Esports
National Paralympic Committee Hall	Powerlifting
Olympic Indoor Hall	Goalball
Olympic Stadium	Football 7-a-side
Royal University of Phnom Penh	Chess

== The Games ==
=== Ceremonies ===
==== Parade of Nations ====
Order	Nation	Flag bearer	Sport
1	Brunei Darussalam (BRU)	Shari Jumaat	Athletics
2	Indonesia (INA)	Dwiska Afrilia Maharani	Powerlifting
3	Lao PDR (LAO)	Latsami Sipaseuth	Powerlifting
4	Malaysia (MAS)	Angeline Melissa Lawas	Boccia
5	Myanmar (MYA)	Aung Phone Myat	Athletics
6	Philippines (PHI)	Ariel Joseph Alegarbes	Swimming
7	Singapore (SGP)	Toh Sze Ning	Boccia
8	Thailand (THA)	Monruedee Kangpila	Swimming
9	Timor Leste (TLS)	Teofilo Freitas	Athletics
10	Vietnam (VIE)	Đỗ Thanh Hải	Swimming
11	Cambodia (CAM) (Host)	Oeun Nut	Sitting volleyball

=== Sports ===
ASEAN Para Sports Federation and Cambodian ASEAN Para Games Organizing Committee (CAMAPGOC) on 29 July 2022 agreed on 12 initial sports for the Games during a meeting held in Surakarta, Indonesia.

Esports were a demonstration event. This marked the first time that the sport was held in a multi-parasports event.

2023 ASEAN Para Games Sports

- Athletics (152)
- Badminton (23)
- Blind football (1)
- Boccia (11)
- Chess (36)
- Esports (1)
- Football 7-a-side (1)
- Goalball (2)
- Judo (13)
- Powerlifting (38)
- Swimming (139)
- Table tennis (53)
- Sitting volleyball (2)
- Wheelchair basketball (4)

=== Participating nations ===
All 11 members of ASEAN Para Sports Federation (APSF) are expected to take part in the 2023 ASEAN para Games.

ASEAN Para Sports Federation

- Brunei (20)
- Cambodia (252) (Host)
- Indonesia (268)
- Laos (43)
- Malaysia (144)
- Myanmar (82)
- Philippines (176)
- Singapore (26)
- Thailand (304)
- Timor-Leste (13)
- Vietnam (128)

=== Calendar ===
All times and dates use Cambodian Standard Time (UTC+7).

OC	Opening ceremony	●	Event competitions	1	Gold medal events	CC	Closing ceremony

June	2 Fri	3 Sat	4 Sun	5 Mon	6 Tue	7 Wed	8 Thu	9 Fri	Events
Ceremonies		OC						CC	
Athletics			23	38	44	47			152
Badminton		2	●	●	●	●	9	12	23
Blind football			●	●	●		1		1
Boccia			●	●	8	●	3		11
Chess		●	12	●	●	12	12		36
Football 7-a-side			●	●	●	●	1		1
Goalball			●	●	●	●	2		2
Judo			5	6	2				13
Powerlifting			10	10	8	10			38
Swimming			35	23	28	31	22		139
Table tennis			●	13	20	●	20		53
Sitting volleyball			●	●	●	1	1		2
Wheelchair basketball	●	2	●	●	●	2			4
Daily medal events	0	4	85	90	110	103	71	12	475
Cumulative total	0	4	89	179	289	392	463	475	475
Demonstration Event
Esports			●	1					1
June	2 Fri	3 Sat	4 Sun	5 Mon	6 Tue	7 Wed	8 Thu	9 Fri	Total events

== Medal table ==
Key

* Host nation (Cambodia)

2023 ASEAN Para Games medal table
Rank	Nation	Gold	Silver	Bronze	Total
1	Indonesia	159	148	94	401
2	Thailand	126	110	92	328
3	Vietnam	66	58	77	201
4	Malaysia	50	38	35	123
5	Philippines	33	33	50	116
6	Myanmar	15	23	19	57
7	Singapore	12	15	17	44
8	Cambodia*	9	18	44	71
9	Brunei	3	3	2	8
10	Timor-Leste	2	0	5	7
11	Laos	0	2	9	11
Totals (11 entries)		475	448	444	1,367

Source: 2023 ASEAN Para Games Medal Tally

== See also ==
- 2023 SEA Games

Preceded by Surakarta	ASEAN Para Games; Phnom Penh; XII ASEAN Para Games (2023)	Succeeded by Nakhon Ratchasima
