= Myanmar at the 2023 ASEAN Para Games =

- IPC code: MYA
- NPC: Myanmar Paralympic Sports Federation

in Phnom Penh, Cambodia 3 June 2023 – 9 June 2023
- Competitors: 82 in 8 sports
- Flag bearer: Aung Khaing Min (Athletics)
- Medals Ranked 6th: Gold 15 Silver 23 Bronze 19 Total 57

Myanmar is participating at the 2023 ASEAN Para Games in Phnom Penh, Cambodia. Ministry of Sports and Youth Affairs sent 82 athletes to compete in 8 sports. Myanmar delegation included totally 126 with 82 athletes and 44 officials. The team was led by General Hla Moe, the chairman of Myanmar Paralympic Sports Federation.

== Medal summary ==
Medal by sport
No	Sports	1st place, gold medalist(s)	2nd place, silver medalist(s)	3rd place, bronze medalist(s)	Total
1	Para Athletics	4	5	4	13
2	Para Swimming	2	4	1	7
Total		6	9	5	20

Medal by day
Day	Date	1st place, gold medalist(s)	2nd place, silver medalist(s)	3rd place, bronze medalist(s)	Total
1	3 June	0	0	0	0
2	4 June	2	4	1	7
3	5 June	4	5	4	13
4	6 June				
5	7 June				
6	8 June				
7	9 June				
Total		6	9	5	20
