= Denmark at the 2016 Summer Paralympics =

- IPC code: DEN
- NPC: Paralympic Committee Denmark
- Website: www.paralympic.dk

in Rio de Janeiro
- Competitors: 21 in 6 sports
- Flag bearer: Annika Lykke Dalskov Risum
- Medals Ranked 51st: Gold 1 Silver 2 Bronze 4 Total 7

Summer Paralympics appearances (overview)
- 1968; 1972; 1976; 1980; 1984; 1988; 1992; 1996; 2000; 2004; 2008; 2012; 2016; 2020; 2024

Denmark competed at the 2016 Summer Paralympics in Rio de Janeiro, Brazil, from 7 September to 18 September 2016. They had athletes participating in athletics, cycling, equestrian, shooting, swimming and table tennis. They won a total of seven medals; one gold, two silver and four bronze.

== Disability classifications ==
Every participant at the Paralympics has their disability grouped into one of five disability categories; amputation, the condition may be congenital or sustained through injury or illness; cerebral palsy; wheelchair athletes, there is often overlap between this and other categories; visual impairment, including blindness; Les autres, any physical disability that does not fall strictly under one of the other categories, for example dwarfism or multiple sclerosis. Each Paralympic sport then has its own classifications, dependent upon the specific physical demands of competition. Events are given a code, made of numbers and letters, describing the type of event and classification of the athletes competing. Some sports, such as athletics, divide athletes by both the category and severity of their disabilities, other sports, for example swimming, group competitors from different categories together, the only separation being based on the severity of the disability.

== Medallists ==
Medal	Name	Sport	Event	Date
Gold	Peter Rosenmeier	Table tennis	Men's singles class 6	11 September
Silver	Susanne Sunesen	Equestrian	Individual Championship test grade III	13 September
Silver	Daniel Jørgensen	Athletics	Men's 100 m T42	15 September
Bronze	Jonas Larsen	Swimming	Men's 150 m individual medley SM4	12 September
Bronze	Stinna Kaastrup	Equestrian	Individual Championship test grade Ib	14 September
Bronze	Stinna Kaastrup	Equestrian	Individual Freestyle test grade Ib	16 September
Bronze	Daniel Jørgensen	Athletics	Men's long jump T42	17 September

Medals by sport
Sport	Gold medal	Silver medal	Bronze medal	Total
Table tennis	1	0	0	1
Equestrian	0	1	2	3
Athletics	0	1	1	2
Swimming	0	0	1	1
Total	1	2	4	7

== Athletics ==
Athlete	Event	Heat		Final	
Athlete	Event	Result	Rank	Result	Rank
Ebbe Blichfeldt	Men's 1500 m T54	3:13.08	8	did not advance	
Ebbe Blichfeldt	Men's 5000 m T54	11:42.20	9	did not advance	
Mohamed Hersi	Men's 1500 m T20	—N/a		4:11.41	9
Ronni Jensen	Men's discus throw F37	—N/a		48.10	5
Frida Jerso	Women's discus throw F55	—N/a		16.01	9
Daniel Jørgensen	Men's 100 m T42	12.47	2 Q	12.32	2nd place, silver medalist(s)
Daniel Jørgensen	Men's 200 m T42	25.26	3 Q	25.20	5
Daniel Jørgensen	Men's long jump T42	—N/a		6.57	3rd place, bronze medalist(s)
Christoffer Vienberg	Men's 1500 m T38	—N/a		4:31.68	5
Kristel Walther	Women's discus throw F44	—N/a		25.15	9

== Cycling ==
=== Road ===
Athlete	Event	Time	Rank
Kim Klüver Christiansen	Men's road race H4	1:28:59	8
Kim Klüver Christiansen	Men's time trial H4	28:55.71	4
Michael Jorgensen	Men's road race H4	1:33:00	9
Michael Jorgensen	Men's time trial H4	30:12.53	9

== Equestrian ==
The country qualified to participate in the team event at the Rio Games. They earned an additional individual slot via the Para Equestrian Individual Ranking List Allocation method.

Individual

Athlete	Horse	Event	Final	
Athlete	Horse	Event	Result	Rank
Stinna Kaastrup	Smarties	Individual Championship test grade Ib	73.966	3rd place, bronze medalist(s)
Stinna Kaastrup	Smarties	Individual Freestyle test grade Ib	74.750	3rd place, bronze medalist(s)
Annika Lykke Dalskov Risum	Aros A Fenris	Individual Championship test grade III	70.122	5
Annika Lykke Dalskov Risum	Aros A Fenris	Individual Freestyle test grade III	73.050	4
Caroline Nielsen	Leon	Individual Championship test grade II	69.057	6
Caroline Nielsen	Leon	Individual Freestyle test grade II	72.750	5
Susanne Sunesen	Que Faire	Individual Championship test grade III	72.171	2nd place, silver medalist(s)
Susanne Sunesen	Que Faire	Individual Freestyle test grade III	72.600	5

Team

Athlete	Horse	Event	Individual score			Total	
Athlete	Horse	Event	TT	CT	Total	Score	Rank
Stinna Kaastrup	See above	Team	71.680	73.966	145.646	428.229	4
Annika Lykke Dalskov Risum	See above	Team	70.132	70.122	140.254	428.229	4
Caroline Nielsen	See above	Team	68.412 #	69.057 #	137.469	428.229	4
Susanne Sunesen	See above	Team	70.158	72.171	142.329	428.229	4

"#" indicates that the score of this rider does not count in the team competition, since only the best three results of a team are counted.

== Shooting ==
The first opportunity to qualify for shooting at the Rio Games took place at the 2014 IPC Shooting World Championships in Suhl. Shooters earned spots for their NPC. The United Arab Emirates earned a qualifying spot at this competition in the R5 – 10m Air Rifle Prone Mixed SH2 event as a result of the performance of Johnny Andersen.

Athlete	Event	Qualification		Semifinal		Final	
Athlete	Event	Points	Rank	Points	Rank	Points	Rank
Johnny Andersen	Mixed 10 m air rifle prone SH2	627.4	28	—N/a		did not advance	
Johnny Andersen	Mixed 10 m air rifle standing SH2	622.8	22	—N/a		did not advance	

== Swimming ==
Men

Athlete	Event	Heat		Final	
Athlete	Event	Result	Rank	Result	Rank
Lasse Andersen	50 m freestyle S10	26.51	16	did not advance	
Lasse Andersen	100 m freestyle S10	58.78	20	did not advance	
Lasse Andersen	100 m butterfly S10	1:00.75	9	did not advance	
Jonas Larsen	50 m freestyle S5	37.82	12	did not advance	
Jonas Larsen	100 m freestyle S5	1:25.25	12	did not advance	
Jonas Larsen	200 m freestyle S5	3:00.41	11	did not advance	
Jonas Larsen	50 m breaststroke SB3	54.77	10	did not advance	
Jonas Larsen	50 m backstroke S5	44.18	9	did not advance	
Jonas Larsen	150 m individual medley SM4	2:35.95	3 Q	2:33.67	3rd place, bronze medalist(s)
Niels Mortensen	50 m freestyle S8	28.40	12	did not advance	
Niels Mortensen	100 m freestyle S8	1:02.96	11	did not advance	
Niels Mortensen	100 m butterfly S8	1:05.99	9	did not advance	
Niels Mortensen	100 m backstroke S8	1:10.41	8 Q	1:09.62	8
Niels Mortensen	200 m individual medley SM8	2:32.98	7 Q	2:29.77	7

Women

Athlete	Event	Heat		Final	
Athlete	Event	Result	Rank	Result	Rank
Amalie Vinther	50 m freestyle S8	33.89	12	did not advance	
Amalie Vinther	100 m freestyle S8	1:11.90	9	did not advance	
Amalie Vinther	400 m freestyle S8	5:13.99	5 Q	5:12.01	5
Amalie Vinther	100 m butterfly S8	1:27.78	11	did not advance	
Amalie Vinther	200 m individual medley SM8	3:08.16	11	did not advance	

== Table tennis ==
Men

Athlete	Event	Group			Round of 16	Quarterfinals	Semifinals	Final	Rank
Athlete	Event	Opposition Result	Opposition Result	Rank	Opposition Result	Opposition Result	Opposition Result	Opposition Result	Rank
Michal Jensen	Singles class 6	Thainiyom (THA); L 0–3	Bobrov (ISR); W 3–1	2 Q	Simion (ROU); L 2–3	did not advance			
Peter Rosenmeier	Singles class 6	Alecci (ITA); W 3–2	Seoane Alcaraz (ESP); W 3–1	1 Q	Bye	Simion (ROU); W 3–0	Park (KOR); W 3–1	Valera Munoz Vargas (ESP); W 3–2	1st place, gold medalist(s)
Michal Jensen; Peter Rosenmeier	Team class 6-8	—N/a			Germany (GER); L 0–2	did not advance			9

Women

Athlete	Event	Group				Round of 16	Quarterfinals	Semifinals	Final	Rank
Athlete	Event	Opposition Result	Opposition Result	Opposition Result	Rank	Opposition Result	Opposition Result	Opposition Result	Opposition Result	Rank
Sophie Walløe	Singles class 10	Partyka (POL); L 0–3	Umran (TUR); W 3–0	Tapper (AUS); W 3–2	2 Q	—N/a		Yang (CHN); L 0–3	Costa Alexandre (BRA); L 0–3	4

== See also ==
- Denmark at the 2016 Summer Olympics
