= Table tennis at the 2016 Summer Paralympics – Women's individual – Class 10 =

Table tennis at the XV Paralympic Games
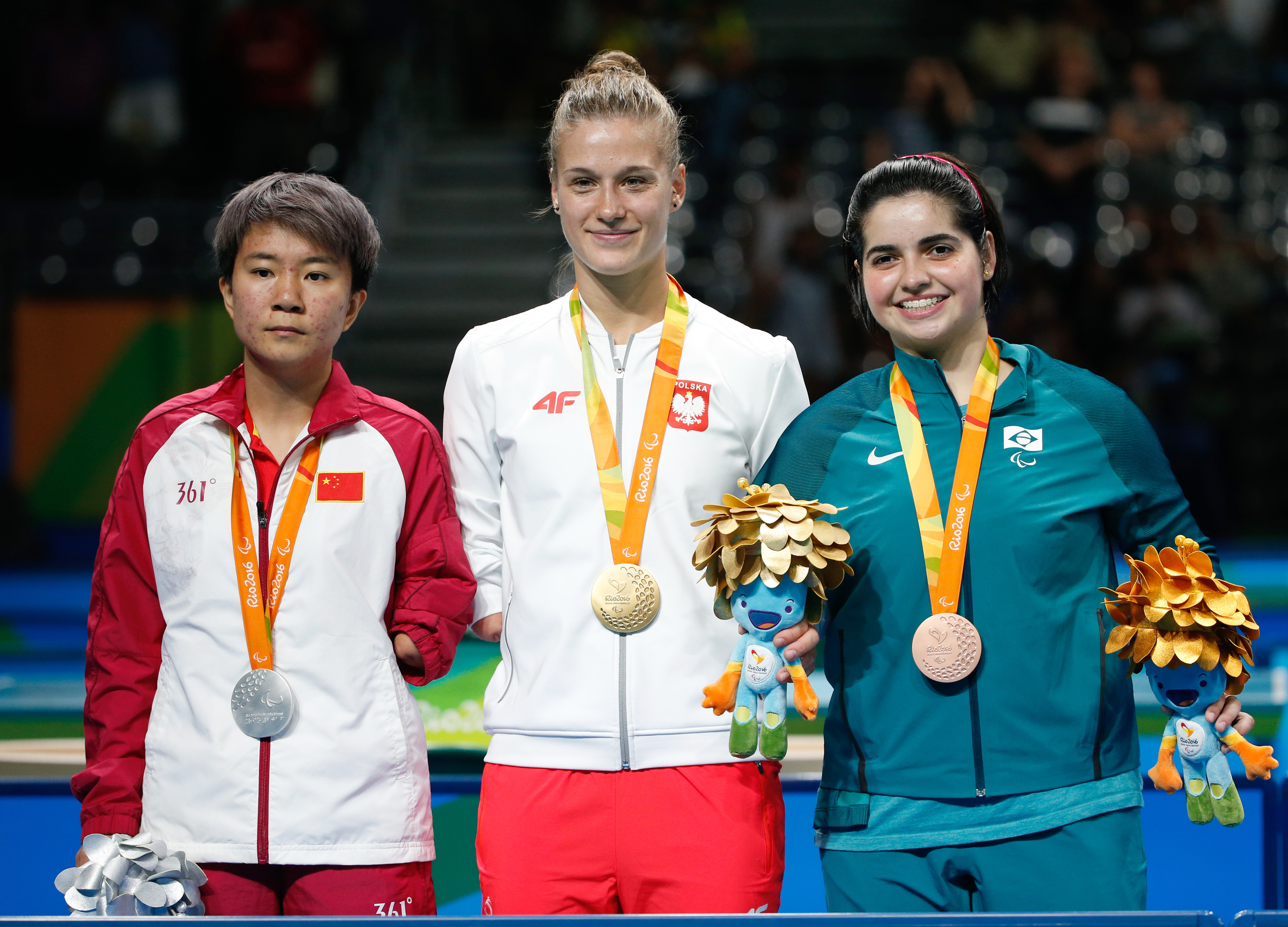
- Left-right: Yang, Partyka, Alexandre
- Venue: Riocentro Pavilion 3
- Dates: 8–13 September 2016
- Competitors: 8 from 8 nations

Medalists
1st place, gold medalist(s)		Natalia Partyka	Poland
2nd place, silver medalist(s)		Yang Qian	China
3rd place, bronze medalist(s)		Bruna Alexandre	Brazil

The women's individual table tennis – Class 6 tournament at the 2016 Summer Paralympics in Rio de Janeiro took place during 8–13 September 2016 at Riocentro Pavilion 3. Classes 6–10 were for athletes with a physical impairment who competed from a standing position; the lower the number, the greater the impact the impairment was on an athlete’s ability to compete.

In the preliminary stage, athletes competed in two groups of four. Winners and runners-up of each group qualified to the semifinals.

== Results ==
Semifinals
A1	Yang Qian (CHN)	11	11	11
B2	Sophie Walløe (DEN)	8	8	9
A2	Bruna Alexandre (BRA)	11	10	11	1	8
B1	Natalia Partyka (POL)	8	12	9	11	11

Final
A1	Yang Qian (CHN)	8	16	5
B1	Natalia Partyka (POL)	11	18	11
Bronze medal match
B2	Sophie Walløe (DEN)	2	11	8
A2	Bruna Alexandre (BRA)	11	13	11

=== Preliminary rounds ===
Group A

Rank	Competitor	MP	W	L	Points	CHN	BRA	CRO	AUS
1	Yang Qian (CHN)	6	3	0	9:3	x	3:0	3:0	3:0
2	Bruna Alexandre (BRA)	5	2	1	6:3	0:3	x	3:0	3:0
3	Mirjana Lučić (CRO)	4	1	2	3:7	0:3	0:3	x	3:1
4	Andrea McDonnell (AUS)	3	0	3	1:9	0:3	0:3	1:3	x

Group B

Rank	Competitor	MP	W	L	Points	POL	DEN	AUS	TUR
1	Natalia Partyka (POL)	3	3	0	9:3	x	3:0	3:0	3:0
2	Sophie Walløe (DEN)	3	2	1	6:5	0:3	x	3:2	3:0
3	Melissa Tapper (AUS)	3	1	2	5:7	0:3	1:3	x	3:2
4	Umran Ertis (TUR)	3	0	3	1:9	0:3	0:3	1:3	x
