= Indonesia at the 2023 ASEAN Para Games =

- IPC code: INA
- NPC: National Paralympic Committee of Indonesia
- Website: www.npcindonesia.org (in Indonesian)

in Phnom Penh, Cambodia
- Competitors: 268 in 12 sports
- Flag bearer: Dwiska Afrilia Maharani (powerlifting)
- Officials: 312
- Medals Ranked 1st: Gold 159 Silver 148 Bronze 94 Total 401

ASEAN Para Games appearances (overview)
- 2001; 2003; 2005; 2008; 2009; 2011; 2013; 2015; 2017; 2020; 2022; 2023; 2025

Indonesia competed at the 2023 ASEAN Para Games in Phnom Penh, Cambodia from 3 to 9 June 2023. The Indonesian contingent consisted of 268 athletes and 312 officials.

Dwiska Afrilia Maharani of the Indonesia Powerlifting Team served as the flagbearer for the opening ceremony.

== Medal summary ==
=== Medal by sport ===
Medals by sport
Sport	1st place, gold medalist(s)	2nd place, silver medalist(s)	3rd place, bronze medalist(s)	Total	Rank
Athletics	42	51	28	121	2
Table tennis	31	16	17	64	1
Swimming	27	37	24	88	3
Powerlifting	17	8	6	31	1
Chess	15	17	8	40	1
Badminton	13	9	8	30	1
Judo	11	5	0	16	1
Boccia	2	2	3	7	2
Sitting Volleyball	1	1	0	2	1
Football 7-a-side	0	1	0	1	2
Goalball	0	1	0	1	2
Total	159	148	94	401	1

=== Medal by gender ===
Medals by gender
Gender	1st place, gold medalist(s)	2nd place, silver medalist(s)	3rd place, bronze medalist(s)	Total	Percentage
Male	92	83	58	233	58.1%
Female	60	59	33	152	37.9%
Mixed	7	6	3	16	4.0%
Total	159	148	94	401	100%

=== Medal by date ===
Medals by date
Day	Date	1st place, gold medalist(s)	2nd place, silver medalist(s)	3rd place, bronze medalist(s)	Total
1	3 June	Opening Ceremony			
1	3 June	1	0	0	1
2	4 June	31	25	16	72
3	5 June	33	24	16	73
4	6 June	36	32	26	94
5	7 June	28	34	14	76
6	8 June	24	26	23	73
7	9 June	6	8	0	14
7	9 June	Closing Ceremony			
Total		159	148	94	401

== Medalists ==
=== Gold ===
No.	Medal	Name	Sport	Event	Date
1	Gold	Suryo Nugroho; Fredy Setiawan; Hafiz Brilliansyah Prawiranegara; Ukun Rukaendi; Dheva Anrimusthi; Hary Susanto	Badminton	Men's team standing	3 June
2	Gold	Jendi Pangabean	Swimming	Men's 400 m Freestyle S9	4 June
3	Gold	Riyanti	Swimming	Women's 400 m Freestyle S6	4 June
4	Gold	Suparni Yati	Athletics	Women's Shot Put F20	4 June
5	Gold	Eneng Paridah	Powerlifting	Women's up to 41kg (best lift)	4 June
6	Gold	Ni Nengah Widiasih	Powerlifting	Women's up to 45kg (best lift)	4 June
7	Gold	Ni Nengah Widiasih	Powerlifting	Women's up to 45kg (total lift)	4 June
8	Gold	Aris Wibawa	Swimming	Men's 100 m Breaststroke SB7	4 June
9	Gold	Zaki Zulkarnain	Swimming	Men's 100 m Breaststroke SB9	4 June
10	Gold	Mutiara Cantik Harsanto	Swimming	Women's 100 m Breaststroke SB9	4 June
11	Gold	Figo Saputra	Athletics	Men's Long Jump T46	4 June
12	Gold	Nasip	Athletics	Men's High Jump T42-44	4 June
13	Gold	Jendi Pangabean	Swimming	Men's 100 m Freestyle S9	4 June
14	Gold	Junaedi	Judo	Men's J1 –60kg	4 June
15	Gold	Marialam Sihotang	Judo	Women's J2 –57kg	4 June
16	Gold	Novia Larassati	Judo	Women's J1 –48kg	4 June
17	Gold	Gus Irvan Madum Ibrahim	Judo	Men's J2 –90kg	4 June
18	Gold	Rizal Saepul Azis	Judo	Men's J1 –71kg	4 June
19	Gold	Karisma Evi Tiarani	Athletics	Women's Long Jump T42-44	4 June
20	Gold	Meliana Ratih Pratama	Swimming	Women's 50 m Backstroke S14	4 June
21	Gold	Riadi Saputra	Athletics	Men's Discus Throw F55	4 June
22	Gold	Menaser Meriba Numberi; Marinus Melianus Yowei; Maulana Rifky Yavianda; Fajar Trihadi	Swimming	Men's Team 4 × 100 m Medley Relay 49 Points	4 June
23	Gold	Fathur Rizky Moreno; Syuci Indriani; Meliana Ratih Pratama; M.Tauhidi Fatahillah	Swimming	Mixed Team 4 × 100 m Freestyle Relay S14	4 June
24	Gold	Fauzi Purwolaksono	Athletics	Men's Discus Throw F57	4 June
25	Gold	Elvin Elhudia Sesa	Athletics	Women's 1500 m T20	4 June
26	Gold	Maksum Firdaus	Chess	Men's Individual Rapid Chess PI	4 June
27	Gold	Indra Yoga	Chess	Men's Individual Rapid Chess VI–B1	4 June
28	Gold	Indra Yoga; Yadi Sopiyan	Chess	Men's Team Rapid Chess VI–B1	4 June
29	Gold	Farah Yumna Budiarti	Chess	Women's Individual Rapid Chess VI–B2/B3	4 June
30	Gold	Farah Yumna Budiarti; Aisyah Wijayanti Putri	Chess	Women's Team Rapid Chess VI–B2/B3	4 June
31	Gold	Maksum Firdaus; Tirto; Alfrets Dien	Chess	Men's Team Rapid Chess P1	4 June
32	Gold	Nur Ferry Pradana; Partin Muhlisin; Ryan Arda Diarta; Rizal Bagus Saktyono	Athletics	Men's Team 4 × 100 m Relay T42/47	4 June
33	Gold	Nur Ferry Pradana	Athletics	Men's 100 m T47	5 June
34	Gold	Firza Faturahman Listianto	Athletics	Men's 100 m T46	5 June
35	Gold	Rizal Bagus Saktyono	Athletics	Men's Javelin Throw F46	5 June
36	Gold	Maulana Rifky Yavianda	Swimming	Men's 50 m Breaststroke SB12	5 June
37	Gold	Syuci Indriani	Swimming	Men's 50 m Butterfly S14	5 June
38	Gold	Margono	Powerlifting	Men's up to 65kg (best lift)	5 June
39	Gold	Margono	Powerlifting	Men's up to 65kg (total lift)	5 June
40	Gold	Saptoyogo Purnomo	Athletics	Men's 100 m T37	5 June
41	Gold	Fajar Pambudi	Judo	Men's J1 –90kg	5 June
42	Gold	Tony Ricardo Mantolas	Judo	Men's J2 +90kg	5 June
43	Gold	Yovan Rate Azis	Judo	Men's J2 –60kg	5 June
44	Gold	Scolastika Nadya Valentin	Judo	Women's J2 –48kg	5 June
45	Gold	Rani Puji Astuti	Powerlifting	Women's up to 61kg (best lift)	5 June
46	Gold	Rani Puji Astuti	Powerlifting	Women's up to 61kg (total lift)	5 June
47	Gold	Shebrioni	Powerlifting	Women's up to 67kg (best lift)	5 June
48	Gold	Shebrioni	Powerlifting	Women's up to 67kg (total lift)	5 June
49	Gold	Adyos Astan; Yayang Gunaya; Sunarto	Table Tennis	Men's Team TT4	5 June
50	Gold	Barce Eysntend Layaba; Tatok Hardiyanto; Sefrianto	Table Tennis	Men's Team TT5	5 June
51	Gold	Mohamad Rian Prahasta; Banyu Tri Mulyo; Leonardo Aritonang	Table Tennis	Men's Team TT8	5 June
52	Gold	Leli Marlena; Tarsilem	Table Tennis	Women's Team TT5	5 June
53	Gold	Siti Fadhillah; Hamida; Suwarti	Table Tennis	Women's Team TT8	5 June
54	Gold	Hana Resti; Imas Yuniar	Table Tennis	Women's Team TT9	5 June
55	Gold	Sella Dwi Radayana; Cici Juliani	Table Tennis	Women's Team TT10	5 June
56	Gold	Ruli Al Kahfi Mubaroq	Athletics	Men's 100 m T11	5 June
57	Gold	Eko Saputra	Athletics	Men's 100 m T12	5 June
58	Gold	Ahmad Fauzi	Athletics	Men's Shot Put F37	5 June
59	Gold	Ni Made Arianti Putri	Athletics	Women's 100 m T12	5 June
60	Gold	Alfin Nomleni	Athletics	Men's 800 m T20	5 June
61	Gold	Bingah Tritih Timur	Athletics	Women's Discus Throw F46	5 June
62	Gold	Warmia Marto Samidi	Athletics	Women's Discus Throw F44	5 June
63	Gold	Reza Pramana Perangin Angin	Athletics	Men's Shot Put F44	5 June
64	Gold	Karisma Evi Tiarani	Athletics	Women's 400 m T42/44	5 June
65	Gold	Partin Muhlisin	Athletics	Men's Long Jump T42	7 June
66	Gold	Jendi Pangabean	Swimming	Men's 100 m Backstroke S9	6 June
67	Gold	Maulana Rifky Yavianda	Swimming	Men's 100 m Freestyle S12	6 June
68	Gold	Tangkilisan Steven Sualang	Swimming	Men's 100 m Backstroke S10	6 June
69	Gold	Maulana Rifky Yavianda	Swimming	Men's 100 m Butterfly S12	6 June
70	Gold	Figo Saputra	Athletics	Men's 400 m T46	6 June
71	Gold	Nur Ferry Pradana	Athletics	Men's 400 m T47	6 June
72	Gold	Yahya Juhdiansyah	Athletics	Men's Discus Throw F44	6 June
73	Gold	Muammar Habibila	Athletics	Men's Long Jump T13	6 June
74	Gold	Marcelino Michael	Athletics	Men's Shot Put F12	6 June
75	Gold	Saptoyogo Purnomo	Athletics	Men's 400 m T37	6 June
76	Gold	Muammar Habibila; Ruli Al Kahfi Mubaroq; Petrus Kanel Alupan; Eko Saputra	Athletics	Men's Team 4 × 100 m Relay T11/13	6 June
77	Gold	Ni Made Arianti Putri	Athletics	Women's 200 m T12	6 June
78	Gold	Karisma Evi Tiarani	Athletics	Women's 200 m T44	6 June
79	Gold	Maria Goreti Samiyati	Athletics	Women's 200 m T54	6 June
80	Gold	Muhamad Afrizal Syafa	Boccia	Men's Individual BC1	6 June
81	Gold	Gischa Zayana	Boccia	Women's Individual BC2	6 June
82	Gold	Siti Mahmudah	Powerlifting	Women's up to 79kg (best lift)	6 June
83	Gold	Siti Mahmudah	Powerlifting	Women's up to 79kg (total lift)	6 June
84	Gold	Maulana Rifky Yavianda	Swimming	Men's 100 m Backstroke S13	6 June
85	Gold	Jendi Pangabean	Swimming	Men's 100 m Butterfly S9	6 June
86	Gold	Jendi Pangabean; Tangkilisan Steven Sualang; Muhammad Gerry Pahker; Zaki Zulkarnain	Swimming	Men's Team 4 × 100 m Medley Relay 34 Points	6 June
87	Gold	Syuci Indriani	Swimming	Women's 100 m Butterfly S14	6 June
88	Gold	Junaedi; Sahrul Sulaiman; Tony Ricardo Mantolas	Judo	Men's Team	6 June
89	Gold	Novia Larassati; Marialam Sihotang; Roma Siska Tampubolon	Judo	Women's Team	6 June
90	Gold	Adyos Astan; Yayang Gunaya	Table Tennis	Men's Doubles TT4	6 June
91	Gold	Barce Eysntend Layaba; Tatok Hardiyanto	Table Tennis	Men's Doubles TT5	6 June
92	Gold	Banyu Tri Mulyo; Mohamad Rian Prahasta	Table Tennis	Men's Doubles TT8	6 June
93	Gold	Komet Akbar; Hilmi Azizi	Table Tennis	Men's Doubles TT10	6 June
94	Gold	Leli Marlina; Tarsilem	Table Tennis	Women's Doubles TT5	6 June
95	Gold	Hamida; Suwarti	Table Tennis	Women's Doubles TT8	6 June
96	Gold	Hana Resti; Imas Yuniar	Table Tennis	Women's Doubles TT9	6 June
97	Gold	Sella Dwi Radayana; Cici Juliani	Table Tennis	Women's Doubles TT10	6 June
98	Gold	Adyos Astan; Tarsilem	Table Tennis	Mixed Doubles T4	6 June
99	Gold	Mohamad Rian Prahasta; Suwarti	Table Tennis	Mixed Doubles T8	6 June
100	Gold	Aman Suratman; Imas Yuniar	Table Tennis	Mixed Doubles TT9	6 June
101	Gold	Komet Akbar; Sella Dwi Radayana	Table Tennis	Mixed Doubles TT10	6 June
102	Gold	Partin Muhlisin	Athletics	Men's 200 m T44	7 June
103	Gold	Figo Saputra	Athletics	Men's 200 m T46	7 June
104	Gold	Nur Ferry Pradana	Athletics	Men's 200 m T47	7 June
105	Gold	Marcelino Michael	Athletics	Men's Discus Throw F12	7 June
106	Gold	Priyano Marto Sarwan	Athletics	Men's Discus Throw F46	7 June
107	Gold	Ruli Al Kahfi Mubaroq	Athletics	Men's 200 m T11	7 June
108	Gold	Eko Saputra	Athletics	Men's 200 m T12	7 June
109	Gold	Saptoyogo Purnomo	Athletics	Men's 200 m T36/37	7 June
110	Gold	Nur Ferry Pradana; Partin Muhlisin; Ryan Arda Diarta; Wakhidun	Athletics	Men's Team 4×400 Relay T42/47	7 June
111	Gold	Famini Dulwahid	Athletics	Women's Discus Throw F56	7 June
112	Gold	Fajar Nur Hadianto	Swimming	Men's 100 m Breaststroke SB4	7 June
113	Gold	Muhammad Gerry Pahker	Swimming	Men's 100 m Breaststroke SB6	7 June
114	Gold	Jendi Pangabean	Swimming	Men's 200 m Individual Medley SM9	7 June
115	Gold	Zaki Zulkarnain	Swimming	Men's 50 m Butterfly S9	7 June
116	Gold	Marinus Melianus Yowei; Menaser Meriba Numberi; Sunarto; Maulana Rifky Yavianda	Swimming	Men's Team 4 × 100 m Freestyle Relay 49 Points	7 June
117	Gold	Atmaji Priambodo	Powerlifting	Men's up to 97kg (best lift)	7 June
118	Gold	Atmaji Priambodo	Powerlifting	Men's up to 97kg (total lift)	7 June
119	Gold	Sriyanti	Powerlifting	Women's over 86kg (best lift)	7 June
120	Gold	Sriyanti	Powerlifting	Women's over 86kg (total lift)	7 June
121	Gold	Ni Nengah Widiasih	Powerlifting	Men's up to 86kg (best lift)	7 June
122	Gold	Ni Nengah Widiasih	Powerlifting	Men's up to 86kg (total lift)	7 June
123	Gold	Anissa Tindy Lestary; Diah Dwiyanti; Katarina Dwi Putri Kristianti; Nia Ramadani; Ratifah Apriyanti; Retno Wahyu Utami; Santi Apriliani; Sudartatik	Sitting volleyball	Women's Team	7 June
124	Gold	Tirto	Chess	Men's Individual Standard Chess PI	7 June
125	Gold	Prasetyo Fitriyanto	Chess	Men's Individual Standard Chess VI–B1	7 June
126	Gold	Maksum Firdaus; Alfrets Dien; Tirto	Chess	Men's Team Standard Chess PI	7 June
127	Gold	Prasetyo Fitriyanto; Indra Yoga; Yadi Sopiyan	Chess	Men's Team Standard Chess VI–B2/B3	7 June
128	Gold	Farah Yumna Budiarti	Chess	Women's Individual Standard Chess VI–B2/B3	7 June
129	Gold	Aisah Wijayanti Putri BR Brahmana; Farah Yumna Budiarti; Khairunnisa	Chess	Women's Team Standard Chess VI–B2/B3	7 June
130	Gold	Mutiara Cantik Harsanto	Swimming	Women's 400 m Freestyle S9	8 June
131	Gold	Dimas Tri Aji; Subhan	Badminton	Men's Doubles SH6	8 June
132	Gold	Rina Marlina; Subhan	Badminton	Mixed Doubles SH6	8 June
133	Gold	Khalimatus Sadiyah; Leani Ratri Oktila	Badminton	Women's Doubles S3–SU5	8 June
134	Gold	Rina Marlina	Badminton	Women's Singles SH6	8 June
135	Gold	Leani Ratri Oktila	Badminton	Women's Singles SL4	8 June
136	Gold	Warining Rahayu	Badminton	Women's Singles SU5	8 June
137	Gold	Wilma Margaretha Sinaga	Chess	Women's Individual Blitz Chess V1–B1	8 June
138	Gold	Prasetyo Fitriyanto; Indra Yoga	Chess	Men's Team Blitz Chess V1–B1	8 June
139	Gold	Prasetyo Fitriyanto	Chess	Men's Individual Blitz Chess V1–B1	8 June
140	Gold	Maulana Rifky Yavianda	Swimming	Women's 50 m Freestyle S12	8 June
141	Gold	Zaki Zulkarnain	Swimming	Men's 50 m Freestyle S9	8 June
142	Gold	Komet Akbar	Table Tennis	Men's Singles TT10	8 June
143	Gold	Muhammad Alfigo Dwiputra	Table Tennis	Men's Singles TT11	8 June
144	Gold	Yayang Gunaya	Table Tennis	Men's Singles TT4	8 June
145	Gold	Tatok Hardiyanto	Table Tennis	Men's Singles TT5	8 June
146	Gold	Mohamad Rian Prahasta	Table Tennis	Men's Singles TT8	8 June
147	Gold	Kusnanto	Table Tennis	Men's Singles TT9	8 June
148	Gold	Sella Dwi Radayana	Table Tennis	Women's Singles TT10	8 June
149	Gold	Ana Widyasari	Table Tennis	Women's Singles TT11	8 June
150	Gold	Leli Marlina	Table Tennis	Women's Singles TT5	8 June
151	Gold	Siti Fadhillah	Table Tennis	Women's Singles TT7	8 June
152	Gold	Suwarti	Table Tennis	Women's Singles TT8	8 June
153	Gold	Hana Resti	Table Tennis	Women's Singles TT9	8 June
154	Gold	Dheva Anrimusthi	Badminton	Men's Singles SU5	9 June
155	Gold	Qonitah Syakuroh	Badminton	Women's Singles SL3	9 June
156	Gold	Hary Susanto; Ukun Rukaendi	Badminton	Men's Doubles SL3–SL4	9 June
157	Gold	Supriadi	Badminton	Men's Singles WH2	9 June
158	Gold	Dheva Anrimusthi; Hafiz Brilliansyah Prawiranegara	Badminton	Men's Doubles SU5	9 June
159	Gold	Hikmat Ramdani; Leani Ratri Oktila	Badminton	Mixed Doubles SL3–SU5	9 June

=== Silver ===
No.	Medal	Name	Sport	Event	Date
1	Silver	Tangkilisan Steven Sualang	Swimming	Men's 400 m Freestyle S10	4 June
2	Silver	Saudah	Swimming	Women's 400 m Freestyle S6	4 June
3	Silver	Putri Maulina	Athletics	Women's Shot Put F63-64	4 June
4	Silver	Seriwati	Athletics	Women's Shot Put F57	4 June
5	Silver	Guntur	Swimming	Men's 100 m Breaststroke SB8	4 June
6	Silver	Bayu Putra Yuda	Swimming	Men's 100 m Breaststroke SB9	4 June
7	Silver	Agus Kurniawan	Athletics	Men's High Jump T42-44	4 June
8	Silver	Marianus Melianus Yowei	Swimming	Men's 100 m Breastroke SB13	4 June
9	Silver	Tangkilisan Steven Sualang	Swimming	Men's 100 m Breastroke SB13	4 June
10	Silver	Nurul Fadilah	Judo	Women's J2 –57kg	4 June
11	Silver	Elda Fahmi Nur Taufik	Judo	Men's J2 –90kg	4 June
12	Silver	Zaki Zulkarnain	Swimming	Men's 100 m Freestyle S9	4 June
13	Silver	Abdul Hadi	Powerlifting	Men's up to 49kg (best lift)	4 June
14	Silver	Abdul Hadi	Powerlifting	Men's up to 49kg (total lift)	4 June
15	Silver	Ansyari Sugian Noor	Athletics	Men's Javelin Throw F40-41	4 June
16	Silver	Maria Wilil	Athletics	Women's Javelin Throw F46	4 June
17	Silver	Tangkilisan Steven Sualang	Swimming	Men's 50 m Backstroke S10	4 June
18	Silver	Rica Oktavia	Athletics	Women's Long Jump T20	4 June
19	Silver	Arya Bima Shena	Athletics	Men's Discus Throw F57	4 June
20	Silver	Tiwa	Athletics	Women's 1500 m T20	4 June
21	Silver	Muammar Habibila	Athletics	Men's 100 m T13	4 June
22	Silver	Yadi Sopiyan	Chess	Men's Individual Rapid Chess VI–B1	4 June
23	Silver	Gayuh Satrio	Chess	Men's Individual Rapid Chess VI–B2/B3	4 June
24	Silver	Gayuh Satrio; Jumaidi	Chess	Men's Team Rapid Chess VI–B2/B3	4 June
25	Silver	Wilma Margaretha Sinaga; Tita Puspita	Chess	Women's Team Rapid Chess VI–B1	4 June
26	Silver	Ratnaningsih	Athletics	Women's Shot Put F11	5 June
27	Silver	Rizal Bagus Saktyono	Athletics	Men's 100 m T47	5 June
28	Silver	Partin Muhlisin	Athletics	Men's 100 m T44	5 June
29	Silver	Insan Nurhaida	Athletics	Women's 100 m T38	5 June
30	Silver	Fajar Nur Hadianto	Swimming	Men's 50 m Backstroke SB4	5 June
31	Silver	Meilana Ratih Pratama	Swimming	Women's 100 m Backstroke S14	5 June
32	Silver	Seriwati	Athletics	Women's Javelin Throw F57	5 June
33	Silver	Muhammad Ihsan Ali; Fathur Rizky Moreno; Daniel Nugroho Wijayanto; M.Tauhidi Fatahillah	Swimming	Men's Team 4 × 100 m Medley Relay S14	5 June
34	Silver	Bayu Pangestu Aji	Judo	Men's J2 –60kg	5 June
35	Silver	Sahrul Sulaiman	Judo	Men's J2 –73kg	5 June
36	Silver	Yuliana Marika Keyn	Judo	Women's J1 –70kg	5 June
37	Silver	Sholahuddin Al Ayyubi	Athletics	Men's Discus Throw F40/41	5 June
38	Silver	Endi Nurdin Tine	Athletics	Men's 800 m T20	5 June
39	Silver	Susan Unggu	Athletics	Women's 400 m T11	5 June
40	Silver	Tiwa	Athletics	Women's 400 m T20	5 June
41	Silver	Nanda Mei Sholihah	Athletics	Women's 400 m T47	5 June
42	Silver	Maria Goreti Samiyati	Athletics	Women's 400 m T54	5 June
43	Silver	Yohanis Bili	Athletics	Men's Shot Put F44	5 June
44	Silver	Cahyo Pambudi; Andi Santoso; Audy Ngangi; Komet Akbar	Table Tennis	Men's Team TT1–3	5 June
45	Silver	Varly Jerico Tilaar; Enceng Mustopa	Table Tennis	Men's Team TT6–7	5 June
46	Silver	Kusnanto; Aman Suratman; Listiana Herawati	Table Tennis	Men's Team TT9	5 June
47	Silver	Komet Akbar; Hilmi Azizi; Rahmat Hidayat	Table Tennis	Men's Team TT10	5 June
48	Silver	Osrita Muslim; Ida Yany	Table Tennis	Women's Team TT1–3	5 June
49	Silver	Erens Sabandar	Athletics	Men's 400 m T46	6 June
50	Silver	Ahmad Fauzi	Athletics	Men's Discus Throw F37	6 June
51	Silver	Yohanis Bili	Athletics	Men's Discus Throw F44	6 June
52	Silver	Fauzi Puwolaksono	Athletics	Men's Shot Put F57	6 June
53	Silver	Susan Unggu	Athletics	Women's 200 m T11	6 June
54	Silver	Insan Nurhaida	Athletics	Women's 200 m T38	6 June
55	Silver	Nanda Mei Sholiah	Athletics	Women's 200 m T47	6 June
56	Silver	Nina Gusmita	Athletics	Women's 200 m T54	6 June
57	Silver	Elvin Elhudia Sesa	Athletics	Women's 800 m T20	6 June
58	Silver	Ratnaningsih	Athletics	Women's Javelin Throw F11	6 June
59	Silver	Warmia Marto Samidi	Athletics	Women's Javelin Throw F44	6 June
60	Silver	Bingah Tritih Timur	Athletics	Women's Shot Put F46	6 June
61	Silver	Tangkilisan Steven Sualang	Swimming	Men's 100 m Butterfly S10	6 June
62	Silver	Marinus Melianus Yowei	Swimming	Men's 100 m Butterfly S13	6 June
63	Silver	Guntur	Swimming	Men's 100 m Butterfly S8	6 June
64	Silver	Mutiara Cantik Harsanto	Swimming	Women's 100 m Backstroke S9	6 June
65	Silver	Mutiara Cantik Harsanto	Swimming	Women's 100 m Butterfly S9	6 June
66	Silver	Syuci Indriani	Swimming	Women's 200 m Individual Medley SM14	6 June
67	Silver	Siti Alifah	Swimming	Women's 200 m Individual Medley SM6	6 June
68	Silver	Mutiara Cantik Harsanto	Swimming	Women's 200 m Individual Medley SM9	6 June
69	Silver	Ummu Kalsum; Ina Prihati Nur Islami; Mutiara Cantik Harsanto; Tiara Hanum Kembang Joyo	Swimming	Women's Team 4 × 100 m Medley Relay 34 Points	6 June
70	Silver	Nurtani Purba	Powerlifting	Women's Up to 73 kg	6 June
71	Silver	Dwiska Afrilia Maharani	Powerlifting	Women's Up to 79 kg	6 June
72	Silver	Dwiska Afrilia Maharani	Powerlifting	Women's Up to 79 kg (Total Lift)	6 June
73	Silver	Totok Hardiyanto; Leli Marlina	Table Tennis	Mixed Doubles T5	6 June
74	Silver	Hamida; Banyu Tri Mulyo; Hana Resti	Table Tennis	Mixed Doubles T8	6 June
75	Silver	Imas Yuniar; Kusnanto	Table Tennis	Mixed Doubles TT9	6 June
76	Silver	Rahmad Hidayat; Enceng Mustopa	Table Tennis	Men's Doubles TT6–7	6 June
77	Silver	Ida Yany; Osrita Muslim	Table Tennis	Women's Doubles TT4	6 June
78	Silver	Syuci Indriani	Swimming	Women's 100 m Freestyle S14	6 June
79	Silver	Muhammad Dimas Ubaidillah	Athletics	Men's 400 m T11	6 June
80	Silver	Alfin Nomleni	Athletics	Men's 400 m T20	6 June
81	Silver	Ryan Arda Diarta	Athletics	Men's 200 m T44	7 June
82	Silver	Firza Faturahman Listianto	Athletics	Men's 200 m T46	7 June
83	Silver	Rizal Bagus Saktyono	Athletics	Men's 200 m T47	7 June
84	Silver	Petrus Kanel Alupan	Athletics	Men's 800 m T12	7 June
85	Silver	Marcelino Michael	Athletics	Men's Javelin Throw F12	7 June
86	Silver	Riadi Saputra	Athletics	Men's Javelin Throw F55	7 June
87	Silver	Fauzi Purwolaksono	Athletics	Men's Javelin Throw F57	7 June
88	Silver	Dapiel Bayage	Athletics	Men's Javelin Throw F63	7 June
89	Silver	Ansyari Sugian Noor	Athletics	Men's Shot Put F40/41	7 June
90	Silver	Priyano Marto Sarwan	Athletics	Men's Shot Put F46	7 June
91	Silver	Muhammad Dimas Ubaidillah; Eko Saputra; Slamet Wahyu Jati; Ruli Al Kahfi Mubaroq	Athletics	Men's Team 4 × 400 m Relay T11/13	7 June
92	Silver	Nanda Mei Sholihah	Athletics	Women's 100 m T47	7 June
93	Silver	Seriwati	Athletics	Women's Discus Throw F57	7 June
94	Silver	Warmia Marto Samidi	Athletics	Women's Javelin Throw F44	7 June
95	Silver	Famini Dulwahid	Athletics	Women's Javelin Throw F56	7 June
96	Silver	Simson Abraham Situmorang	Swimming	Men's 100 m Breaststroke SB4	7 June
97	Silver	Mulyadi	Swimming	Men's 200 m Individual Medley SM5	7 June
98	Silver	Zaki Zulkarnain	Swimming	Men's 200 m Individual Medley SM9	7 June
99	Silver	Bayu Putra Yuda	Swimming	Men's 200 m Individual Medley SM10	7 June
100	Silver	Bayu Putra Yuda	Swimming	Men's 50 m Butterfly S10	7 June
101	Silver	Januari	Swimming	Men's 50 m Freestyle S5	7 June
102	Silver	Mulyadi; Fajar Nur Hadianto; Muhammad Gerry Pahker; Januari	Swimming	Men's Team 4×50 m Medley Relay 20 Points	7 June
103	Silver	Siti Alfiah	Swimming	Women's 100 m Breaststroke SB6	7 June
104	Silver	Meliana Ratih Pratama	Swimming	Women's 200 m Freestyle S14	7 June
105	Silver	Riyanti	Swimming	Women's 50 m Butterfly S6	7 June
106	Silver	Siti Alfiah	Swimming	Women's 50 m Freestyle S6	7 June
107	Silver	Andika Eka Jaya	Powerlifting	Men's up to 88kg (best lift)	7 June
108	Silver	Elsa Dewi Saputri	Powerlifting	Women's over 86kg (best lift)	7 June
109	Silver	Elsa Dewi Saputri	Powerlifting	Women's over 86kg (total lift)	7 June
110	Silver	Maksum Firdaus	Chess	Men's Individual Standard Chess PI	7 June
111	Silver	Jumadi	Chess	Men's Individual Standard Chess VI–B2/B3	7 June
112	Silver	Jumadi; Gayuh Satrio; Adji Hartono	Chess	Men's Team Standard Chess VI–B2/B3	7 June
113	Silver	Aisah Wijayanti Putri BR Brahmana	Chess	Women's Individual Standard Chess VI–B2/B3	7 June
114	Silver	Wilma Margaretha Sinaga; Tita Puspita; Yustina Halawa	Chess	Women's Team Standard Chess VI–B1	7 June
115	Silver	Januari	Swimming	Men's 100 m Freestyle S5	8 June
116	Silver	Siti Alfiah	Swimming	Women's 100 m Freestyle S6	8 June
117	Silver	Syuci Indriani	Swimming	Women's 50 m Freestyle S14	8 June
118	Silver	Suci Kirana Dewi; Trimo Coba Kuwat	Boccia	Mixed Pair BC3	8 June
119	Silver	Handayani; Felix Ardi Yudha; Muhammad Bintang Satria Herlangga	Boccia	Mixed Team BC1–2	8 June
120	Silver	Indonesia Men's Goalball Team	Goalball	Men's Team	8 June
121	Silver	Khalimatus Sadiyah	Badminton	Women's Singles SL4	8 June
122	Silver	Maksum Firdaus	Chess	Men's Individual Blitz Chess P1	8 June
123	Silver	Maksum Firdaus; Tirto	Chess	Men's Team Blitz Chess P1	8 June
124	Silver	Gayuh Satrio; Adji Hartono	Chess	Men's Team Blitz Chess V1–B2/B3	8 June
125	Silver	Lilis Herna Yulia	Chess	Women's Individual Blitz Chess P1	8 June
126	Silver	Farah Yumna Budiarti	Chess	Women's Individual Blitz Chess V1–B2/B3	8 June
127	Silver	Lilis Herna Yulia; Yuni	Chess	Women's Team Blitz Chess P1	8 June
128	Silver	Wilma Margaretha Sinaga; Tita Puspita	Chess	Men's Team Blitz Chess V1–B1	8 June
129	Silver	Farah Yumna Budiarti; Khairunnisa	Chess	Women's Team Blitz Chess V1–B2/B3	8 June
130	Silver	Indonesia Men's Football 7-a-side Team	Football	Football 7-a-side	8 June
131	Silver	Bayu Putra Yuda	Swimming	Men's 50 m Freestyle S10	8 June
132	Silver	Marinus Melianus Yowei	Swimming	Men's 50 m Freestyle S13	8 June
133	Silver	Rino Saputra	Swimming	Men's 50 m Freestyle S9	8 June
134	Silver	Audy Ngangi	Table tennis	Men's Singles TT2	8 June
135	Silver	Adyos Astan	Tabe tennis	Men's Singles TT4	8 June
136	Silver	Varly Jerico Tilaar	Table tennis	Men's Singles TT6	8 June
137	Silver	Aman Suratman	Table tennis	Men's Singles TT9	8 June
138	Silver	Metri	Table tennis	Women's Singles TT11	8 June
139	Silver	Imas Yuniar	Table tennis	Women's Singles TT9	8 June
140	Silver	Purwadi; Nasrullah; Cahyana; Sukarno; Nesa Kristiana; Anton Hilman; Ricky Bustami; Murdiyan	Sitting volleyball	Men's Team	8 June
141	Silver	Dwiyoko; Fredy Setiawan	Badminton	Men's Doubles SL3–SL4	9 June
142	Silver	Oddie Kurnia Dwi Listaynto Putra; Suryo Nugroho	Badminton	Men's Doubles SU5	9 June
143	Silver	Subhan	Badminton	Men's Singles SH6	9 June
144	Silver	Maman Nurjaman	Badminton	Men's Singles SL3	9 June
145	Silver	Hikmat Ramdani	Badminton	Men's Singles SL4	9 June
146	Silver	Suryo Nugroho	Badminton	Men's Singles SU5	9 June
147	Silver	Wiwin Andri	Badminton	Men's Singles WH2	9 June
148	Silver	Fredy Setiawan; Khalimatus Sadiyah	Badminton	Mixed Doubles SL3–SU5	9 June

=== Bronze ===
No.	Medal	Name	Sport	Event	Date
1	Bronze	Reni Ariyanti	Athletics	Women's Shot Put F57	4 June
2	Bronze	Eneng Paridah	Powerlifting	Women's up to 41kg (total lift)	4 June
3	Bronze	Ummu Kalsum	Swimming	Women's 100 m Breaststroke SB9	4 June
4	Bronze	Rino Saputra	Swimming	Men's 100 m Freestyle S9	4 June
5	Bronze	Helin Wardina	Athletics	Women's Long Jump T42-44	4 June
6	Bronze	Nur Irmansyah	Powerlifting	Men's up to 49kg (best lift)	4 June
7	Bronze	Nur Irmansyah	Powerlifting	Men's up to 49kg (total lift)	4 June
8	Bronze	Sholahuddin Al Ayyubi	Athletics	Men's Javelin Throw F40/41	4 June
9	Bronze	Rahmad Tulloh	Swimming	Men's 50 m Backstroke S10	4 June
10	Bronze	Fathur Rizky Moreno	Swimming	Men's 50 m Backstroke S14	4 June
11	Bronze	Jendi Pangabean; Zaki Zulkarnain; Suriansyah; Rino Saputra	Swimming	Men's Team 4 × 100 m Freestyle Relay 34 Points	4 June
12	Bronze	Prasrtyo Fitriyanto	Chess	Men's Individual Rapid Chess VI–B2/B3	4 June
13	Bronze	Nasib Farta Simanja	Chess	Women's Individual Rapid Chess PI	4 June
14	Bronze	Wilma Margaretha Sinaga	Chess	Women's Individual Rapid Chess VI–B1	4 June
15	Bronze	Aisah Wijayanti Putri Brahmana	Chess	Women's Individual Rapid Chess VI–B2/B3	4 June
16	Bronze	Nasib Farta Simanja	Chess	Women's Team Rapid Chess P1	4 June
17	Bronze	Ryan Arda Diarta	Athletics	Men's 100 m T44	5 June
18	Bronze	Jaenal Aripin	Athletics	Men's 100 m T54	5 June
19	Bronze	Priyano Marto Sarwan	Athletics	Men's Javelin Throw F46	5 June
20	Bronze	Simson Abraham Situmorang	Swimming	Men's 200 m Freestyle S4	5 June
21	Bronze	Menaser Meriba Numberi	Swimming	Men's 50 m Breaststroke SB12	5 June
22	Bronze	Marinus Melianus Yowei	Swimming	Men's 50 m Breaststroke SB13	5 June
23	Bronze	Simson Abraham Situmorang	Swimming	Men's 50 m Breaststroke SB13	5 June
24	Bronze	Mulyadi	Swimming	Men's 50 m Breaststroke SB5	5 June
25	Bronze	Aris Wibawa	Swimming	Men's 50 m Breaststroke SB7	5 June
26	Bronze	Guntur	Swimming	Men's 50 m Breaststroke SB8	5 June
27	Bronze	Muhammad Dimas Ubaidillah	Athletics	Men's 100 m T11	5 June
28	Bronze	Ansyari Sugian Noor	Athletics	Men's Discus Throw F40/41	5 June
29	Bronze	Elvin Elhudia Sesa	Athletics	Women's 400 m T20	5 June
30	Bronze	Maria Wilil	Athletics	Women's Discus Throw F46	5 June
31	Bronze	Helin Wardana	Athletics	Women's 400 m T42/44	5 June
32	Bronze	Ryan Arda Diarta	Athletics	Men's Long Jump T42/44	5 June
33	Bronze	Maria Wilil	Athletics	Women's Shot Put F46	6 June
34	Bronze	Jaenal Aripin	Athletics	Men's 400 m T54	6 June
35	Bronze	Reza Pramana Perangin Angin	Athletics	Men's Discus Throw F44	6 June
36	Bronze	Riadi Saputra	Athletics	Men's Shot Put F55	6 June
37	Bronze	Eko Saputra	Athletics	Men's 400 m T12	6 June
38	Bronze	Sutarno Kaswan	Athletics	Men's Discus Throw F63	6 June
39	Bronze	Maria Goreti Samiyati	Athletics	Women's 800 m T54	6 June
40	Bronze	Tiwa	Athletics	Women's 800 m T20	6 June
41	Bronze	Rino Saputra	Swimming	Men's 100 m Backstroke S9	6 June
42	Bronze	Menaser Meriba Numberi	Swimming	Men's 100 m Freestyle S12	6 June
43	Bronze	Marinus Melianus Yowei	Swimming	Men's 100 m Freestyle S13	6 June
44	Bronze	Meliana Ratih Pratama	Swimming	Women's 100 m Freestyle S14	6 June
45	Bronze	Menaser Meriba Numberi	Swimming	Men's 100 m Backstroke S13	6 June
46	Bronze	Amanda Nur Safitri	Swimming	Women's Individual Medley SM6	6 June
47	Bronze	Yayang Gunaya; Osrita Muslim	Table tennis	Mixed Doubles S4	6 June
48	Bronze	Siti Fadhillah; Eceng Mustopa	Table tennis	Mixed Doubles T6–7	6 June
49	Bronze	Ida Yanyh; Sefrianto	Table tennis	Mixed Doubles TT1–3	6 June
50	Bronze	Varly Jerico Tilaar; Lenardo Aritonang	Table tennis	Men's Doubles TT8	6 June
51	Bronze	Kusnanto; Aman Suratman	Table tennis	Men's Doubles TT9	6 June
52	Bronze	Felix Ardi Yudha	Boccia	Men's Individual BC2	6 June
'53	Bronze	Faris Sugiarta	Boccia	Men's Individual BC4	6 June
54	Bronze	Handayani	Boccia	Women's Individual BC1	6 June
55	Bronze	Tambi Sibarani	Powerlifting	Women's up to 80kg (best lift)	6 June
56	Bronze	Nurtani Purba	Powerlifting	Women's up to 73kg (total lift)	6 June
57	Bronze	Slamet Wahyu Jati	Athletics	Men's 400 m T13	6 June
58	Bronze	Helin Wardina	Athletics	Women's 200 m T42/44	6 June
59	Bronze	Mulyadi	Swimming	Men's 100 m Breaststroke SB5	7 June
60	Bronze	Riyanti	Swimming	Women's 100 m Breaststroke SB6	7 June
61	Bronze	Riyanti	Swimming	Women's 50 m Freestyle S6	7 June
62	Bronze	Siti Alfiah	Swimming	Women's 50 m Butterfly S6	7 June
63	Bronze	Wakhidun	Athletics	Men's 200 m T44	7 June
64	Bronze	Nasrodin	Athletics	Men's 5000 m T20	7 June
65	Bronze	Ahmad Fauzi	Athletics	Men's Javelin Throw F37	7 June
66	Bronze	Sutarno Kaswan	Athletics	Men's Javelin Throw F63	7 June
67	Bronze	Sutarno Kaswan	Athletics	Men's Shot Put F63	7 June
68	Bronze	Dwi Oktaviani	Athletics	Women's Discus Throw F55	7 June
69	Bronze	Andika Eka Jaya	Powerlifting	Men's up to 88kg (total lift)	7 June
70	Bronze	Agung Widodo; Supriadi	Badminton	Men's Doubles WH1/2	7 June
71	Bronze	Wilma Margaretha Sinaga	Chess	Women's Individual Standard Chess VI–B1	7 June
71	Bronze	Nasib Farta Simanja; Yuni; Lilis Herna Yulia	Chess	Women's Team Standard Chess PI	7 June
72	Bronze	Simson Abraham Situmorang	Swimming	Men's 100 m Freestyle S4	8 June
73	Bronze	Riyanti	Swimming	Women's 100 m Freestyle S6	8 June
74	Bronze	Ina Prihati Nur Islam	Swimming	Women's 400 m Freestyle S9	8 June
75	Bronze	Lia Priyanti; Qonitah Syakuroh	Badminton	Women's Doubles SL3–SU5	8 June
76	Bronze	Yunia Widya Irianti	Badminton	Women's Singles SH6	8 June
77	Bronze	Khairunnisa	Chess	Women's Individual Blitz Chess VI–B2/B3	8 June
78	Bronze	Achmad Yusuf	Table tennis	Men's Singles TT11	8 June
79	Bronze	Sefrianto	Table tennis	Men's Singles TT3	8 June
80	Bronze	Sunarto	Table tennis	Men's Singles TT4	8 June
81	Bronze	Barce Eysntend Layaba	Table tennis	Men's Singles TT5	8 June
82	Bronze	Rahmat Hidayat	Table tennis	Men's Singles TT6	8 June
83	Bronze	Enceng Mustopa	Table tennis	Men's Singles TT7	8 June
84	Bronze	Leonardo Aritonang	Table tennis	Men's Singles TT8	8 June
85	Bronze	Banyu Tri Mulyo	Table tennis	Men's Singles TT8	8 June
86	Bronze	Osrita Muslim	Table tennis	Women's Singles TT3	8 June
87	Bronze	Tarsilem	Table tennis	Women's Singles TT4	8 June
88	Bronze	Hamida	Table tennis	Women's Singles TT8	8 June
89	Bronze	Dimas Tri Aji	Badminton	Men's Singles SH6	8 June
90	Bronze	Ukun Rukaendi	Badminton	Men's Singles SL3	8 June
91	Bronze	Fredy Setiawan	Badminton	Men's Singles SL4	8 June
92	Bronze	Oddie Kurnia Dwi Listyanto Putra	Badminton	Men's Singles SU5	8 June
93	Bronze	Agus Budi Utomo	Badminton	Men's Singles WH2	8 June
94	Bronze	Menaser Meriba Numberi	Swimming	Men's 50 m Freestyle S12	8 June

== Multiple medalists ==
Name	Sport	1st place, gold medalist(s)	2nd place, silver medalist(s)	3rd place, bronze medalist(s)	Total
Jendi Pangabean	Swimming	6	0	1	7
Maulana Rifky Yavianda	Swimming	6	0	0	6
Karisma Evi Tiarani	Athletics	3	0	0	3
Dheva Anrimusthi	Badminton	3	0	0	3
Leani Ratri Oktila	Badminton	3	0	0	3
Ni Nengah Widiasih	Powerlifting	2	0	0	2
Fredy Setiawan	Badminton	1	2	1	4
Khalimatus Sadiyah	Badminton	1	2	0	3
Qonitah Ikhtiar Syakuroh	Badminton	1	0	1	2

== Badminton ==
=== Men ===
Athlete	Event	Group stage				Quarterfinals	Semi Final	Final	
Athlete	Event	Opposition Score	Opposition Score	Opposition Score	Rank	Opposition Score	Opposition Score	Opposition Score	Rank
Subhan	Men's Single SH6	AK Muhd Amirul Fa'iq PG Zali (BRU); W 2–0 (21–7, 21–4)	Bunthan Yaemmali (THA); W 2–0 (21–15, 21–12)	—N/a	1 Q	—N/a	Muhammad Amin Bin Azmi (MAS); W 2–0 (21–15, 21–11)	Nattapong Meechai (THA); L 0–2 (10–21, 9–21)	2nd place, silver medalist(s)
Dimas Tri Aji	Men's Single SH6	Has Lyhak (CAM); W 2–0 (21–0, 21–3)	Nattapong Meechai (THA); L 0–2 (10–21, 11–21)	—N/a	2 Q	Xavier Jie Rui Lim (SGP); W 2–0 (21–12, 21–16)	Nattapong Meechai (THA); L 0–2 (19–21, 8–21)	Did not advance	3rd place, bronze medalist(s)
Maman Nurjaman	Men's Single SL3	Suy Samnang (CAM); W 2–0 (21–7, 21–6)	Joseph Garbo Asoque (PHI); W 2–0; WO	—N/a	1 Q	Trinh Anh Tuan (VIE); W 2–1 (14–21, 21–17, 21–13)	Ukun Rukaendi (INA); W 2–0 (21–15, 21–13)	Mongkhon Bunsun (THA); L 0–2 (16–21, 6–21)	2nd place, silver medalist(s)
Dwiyoko	Men's Single SL3	Muhammad Huzairi Bin Abdul Malek (MAS); L 1–2 (16–21, 21–18, 13–21)	Singha Sangnil (THA); W 2–1 (24–22, 14–21, 21–7)	—N/a	2 Q	Ukun Rukaendi (INA); L 0–2 (20–22, 12–21)	Did not advance		
Ukun Rukaendi	Men's Single SL3	Sen Vary (CAM); W 2–0; WO	Poloong Loc (VIE); W 2–0 (21–12, 21–10)	—N/a	1 Q	Dwiyoko (INA); W 2–0 (22–20, 21–12)	Maman Nurjaman (INA); L 0–2 (15–21, 13–21)	Did not advance	3rd place, bronze medalist(s)
Hikmat Ramdani	Men's Single SL4	Isma Rafiq Jaime (BRU); W 2–0 (21–4, 21–8)	Muhammad Zulfatihi Bin Jafaar (MAS); W 2–0 (21–7, 21–14)	—N/a	1 Q	Siripong Teamarrom (THA); W 2–0 (21–18, 21–11)	Chawarat Kittichokwattana (THA); W 2–0 (19–21, 21–17, 21–10)	Muhammad Amin Bin Burhanuddin (MAS); L 1–2 (18–21, 21–9, 14–21)	2nd place, silver medalist(s)
Fredy Setiawan	Men's Single SL4	Chee Hiong Ang (SGP); W 2–0 (21–13, 21–14)	Dekester Jean Yves (CAM); W 2–0	—N/a	1 Q	Ta Truc (VIE); W 2–0 (21–11, 21–7)	Muhammad Amin Bin Burhanuddin (MAS); L 0–2 (12–21, 14–21)	Did not advance	3rd place, bronze medalist(s)
Dheva Anrimusthi	Men's Single SU5	Bui Minh Hai (VIE); W 2–0 (21–11, 21–7)	Pricha Somsiri (THA); W 2–0 (21–12, 21–5)	—N/a	1 Q	Muhammad Fareez Bin Anuar (MAS); W 2–0 (21–14, 21–9)	Wei Ming Tay (SGP); W 2–0 (21–10, 21–11)	Suryo Nugroho (INA); W 2–0 (21–11, 21–9)	1st place, gold medalist(s)
Suryo Nugroho	Men's Single SU5	Muhammad Fareez Bin Anuar (MAS); W 2–0 (22–20, 21–18)	Pham Van Toi (VIE); W 2–0 (21–10, 21–13)	—N/a	1 Q	Amyrul Yazid Bin Ahmad Sibi (MAS); W 2–0 (21–10, 21–13)	Oddie Kurnia Dwi Listyanto Putra (INA); W 2–0 (21–5, 21–9)	Dheva Anrimusthi (INA); L 0–2 (11–21, 9–21)	2nd place, silver medalist(s)
Oddie Kurnia Dwi Listyanto Putra	Men's Single SU5	Mohamad Faris Bin Ahmad Azri (MAS); W 2–0 (23–21, 21–17)	Antonio Dela Cruz Jr. (PHI); W 2–0 (21–7, 21–19)	Choa Tyhrith (CAM); W 2–0 (21–4, 21–4)	1 Q	Pricha Somsiri (THA); W 2–0 (21–12, 21–13)	Suryo Nugroho (INA); L 0–2 (5–21, 9–21)	Did not advance	3rd place, bronze medalist(s)
Agung Widodo	Men's Single WH1	Jakarain Homhual (THA); L 0–2 (14–21, 7–21)	Muhammad Ikhwan Bin Ramli (MAS); L 0–2 (20–22, 6–21)	—N/a	3	Did not advance			
Supriadi	Men's Single WH2	Truong Ngoc Binh (VIE); W 2–0 (21–16, 21–13)	Dumnern Junthong (THA); L 0–2 (21–23, 13–21)	—N/a	2 Q	Ashley Irenaeus Bin Jeck (MAS); W 2–0 (21–8, 21–14)	Agus Budi Utomo (INA); W 2–0 (21–17, 22–24)	Wiwin Andri (INA); W 2–0 (21–17, 21–18)	1st place, gold medalist(s)
Wiwin Andri	Men's Single WH2	Ashley Irenaeus Bin Jeck (MAS); W 2–0 (21–15, 21–19)	Hoang Cong Dong (VIE); W 2–0 (21–6, 21–5)	—N/a	1 Q	Noor Azwan Bin Noorlan (MAS); W 2–0 (21–13, 21–11)	Dumnern Junthong (THA); W 2–0 (21–10, 21–14)	Wiwin Andri (INA); L 0–2 (17–21, 18–21)	2nd place, silver medalist(s)
Agus Budi Utomo	Men's Single WH2	Apichat Sumpradit (THA); W 2–0 (21–17, 21–14)	Noor Azwan Bin Noorlan (MAS); W 2–1 (16–21, 21–19, 21–19)	—N/a	1 Q	—N/a	Supriadi (INA); L 0–2 (17–21, 22–24)	Did not advance	3rd place, bronze medalist(s)
Hary Susanto; Ukun Rukaendi	Men's Double SL3/4	Muhamad Zulfatihi Bin Jaafar; Muhammad Huzairi Bin Abdul Malek (MAS); W 2–0 (21–19, 21–10)	Poloong Loc; Ta Truc (VIE); W 2–0 (21–15, 21–13)	Chawarat Kittichokwattana; Mongkhon Bunsun (THA); W 2–1 (21–12, 8–21, 21–19)	1 Q	—N/a	Singha Sangnil; Siripong Teamarrom (THA); W 2–0 (21–15, 21–19)	Dwiyoko; Fredy Setiawan (INA); W 2–1 (21–19, 13–21, 21–19)	1st place, gold medalist(s)
Dwiyoko; Fredy Setiawan	Men's Double SL3/4	Singha Sangnil; Siripong Teamarrom (THA); W 2–0 (21–14, 21–16)	Nguyen Van Thuong; Trinh Anh Tuan (VIE); W 2–0 (21–10, 21–15)	Sen Vary; Suy Samnang (CAM); W 2–0 (21–8, 21–7)	1 Q	—N/a	Chawarat Kittichokwattana; Mongkhon Bunsun (THA); W 2–0 (21–16, 21–15)	Hary Susanto; Ukun Rukaendi (INA); L 1–2 (19–21, 21–13, 19–21)	2nd place, silver medalist(s)
Dheva Anrimusthi; Hafiz Brilliansyah Prawiranegara	Men's Double SU5	Nattaphon Taweesap; Pricha Somsiri (THA); W 2–0 (21–14, 21–15)	Mohamad Faris Bin Ahmad Azri; Muhammad Fareez Bin Anuar (MAS); W 2–0 (21–15, 21–10)	Bui Minh Hai; Pham Van Toi (VIE); W 2–0 (21–16, 21–13)	1 Q	—N/a	Amyrul Yazid Bin Ahmad Sibi; Muhammad Amin Bin Burhanuddin (MAS); W 2–0 (21–11, 21–9)	Oddie Kurnia Dwi Listaynto Putra; Suryo Nugroho (INA); W 2–0 (21–12, 21–10)	1st place, gold medalist(s)
Oddie Kurnia Dwi Listaynto Putra; Suryo Nugroho	Men's Double SU5	Amyrul Yazid Bin Ahmad Sibi; Muhammad Amin Bin Burhanuddin (MAS); W 2–0 (21–12, 21–16)	Antonio Dela Cruz Jr. Basil Anthony Esolana Hermogenes (PHI); W 2–0 (21–11, 21–19)	Chee Hiong Ang; Wei Ming Tay (SGP); W 2–0 (21–15, 21–10)	1 Q	—N/a	Mohamad Faris Bin Ahmad Azri; Muhammad Fareez Bin Anuar (MAS); W 2–1 (21–16, 19–21, 24–22)	Dheva Anrimusthi; Hafiz Brilliansyah Prawiranegara (INA); L 0–2 (12–21, 10–21)	2nd place, silver medalist(s)
Subhan; Dimas Tri Aji	Men's Double SH6	Bunthan Yaemmali; Nattapong Meechai (THA); W 2–0 (21–12, 21–19)	Pay Veasna; Veng Ve (CAM); W 2–0 (21–4, 21–2)	Has Lyhak; Rith Metriey (CAM); W 2–0 (21–7, 21–4)	1	—N/a			1st place, gold medalist(s)
Agung Widodo; Supriadi	Men's Double WH1/2	Aphicat Sumpradit; Chatchai Kornpeekanok (THA); W 2–1 (21–17, 18–21, 21–14)	Muhammad Ikhwan Bin Ramli; Noor Azwan Bin Noorlan (MAS); L 0–2 (13–21, 20–22)	—N/a	2 Q	—N/a	Dumnern Junthong; Jakarin Homhual (THA); W 2–1 (12–21, 24–22, 14–21)	Did not advance	3rd place, bronze medalist(s)
Suryo Nugroho; Fredy Setiawan; Hafiz Brilliansyah Prawiranegara; Ukun Rukaendi; Dheva Anrimusthi; Hary Susanto	Men's team standing	—N/a					Vietnam; W 2–0	Malaysia; W 2–1	1st place, gold medalist(s)

=== Women ===
Athlete	Event	Group stage					Semi Final	Final	
Athlete	Event	Opposition Score	Opposition Score	Opposition Score	Opposition Score	Rank	Opposition Score	Opposition Score	Rank
Rina Marlina	Women's Single SH6	Yunia Widya Irianti (INA); W 2–0 (21–4, 21–11)	Chai Saeyang (THA); W 2–0 (21–4, 21–4)	Ardinia Calisay Bermudez (PHI); W 2–0 (21–1, 21–4)	—N/a	1	—N/a		1st place, gold medalist(s)
Yunia Widya Irianti	Women's Single SH6	Rina Marlina (INA); L 0–2 (4–21, 11–21)	Ardinia Calisay Bermudez (PHI); W 2–0 (21–6, 21–4)	Chai Saeyang (THA); L 0–2 (9–21, 8–21)	—N/a	3	—N/a		3rd place, bronze medalist(s)
Qonitah Syakuroh	Women's Single SL3	Poch Kaolong (CAM); W 2–0 (21–3, 21–2)	Wandee Kamtam (THA); W 2–0 (21–9, 21–4)	—N/a		1 Q	Chha Sreyneang (CAM); W 2–0 (21–1, 21–0)	Darunee Henpraiwan (THA); W 2–0 (21–7, 21–10)	1st place, gold medalist(s)
Leani Ratri Oktila	Women's Single SL4	Lia Priyanti (INA); W 2–0 (21–6, 21–5)	Khalimatus Sadiyah (INA); W 2–0 (23–21, 21–18)	Chanida Srinavakul (THA); W 2–0 (21–8, 21–10)	Ma. Cielo Dimain Honasan (PHI); W 2–0 (21–7, 21–3)	1	—N/a		1st place, gold medalist(s)
Khalimatus Sadiyah	Women's Single SL4	Leani Ratri Oktila (INA); L 0–2 (21–23, 18–21)	Chanida Srinavakul (THA); W 2–0 (21–13, 21–16)	Ma. Cielo Dimain Honasan (PHI); W 2–0 (21–5, 21–2)	Lia Priyanti (INA); W 2–0 (21–11, 21–11)	2	—N/a		2nd place, silver medalist(s)
Lia Priyanti	Women's Single SL4	Leani Ratri Oktila (INA); L 0–2 (6–21, 5–21)	Chanida Srinavakul (THA); L 0–2 (17–21, 13–21)	Ma. Cielo Dimain Honasan (PHI); W 2–0 (21–6, 21–2)	Khalimatus Sadiyah (INA); W 0–2 (11–21, 11–21)	4	—N/a		4
Warining Rahayu	Women's Single SU5	Anisa Fitriyani (INA); W 2–0 (21–12, 21–7)	Wathini Naramitkornburee (THA); W 2–0 (21–13, 21–14)	—N/a		1	—N/a		1st place, gold medalist(s)
Anisa Fitriyani	Women's Single SU5	Warining Rahayu (INA); L 0–2 (12–21, 7–21)	Wathini Naramitkornburee (THA); L 0–2 (9–21, 6–21)	—N/a		3	—N/a		3
Khalimatus Sadiyah; Leani Ratri Oktila	Women's Double SL3–SU5	Lia Priyanti; Qonitah Syakuroh (INA); W 2–0 (21–6, 21–14)	Wandee Kamtam; Wathini Naramitkornburee (THA); W 2–0 (21–14, 21–5)	Chanida Srinavakul; Nipada Saensupa (THA); W 2–0 (21–16, 21–14)	—N/a	1	—N/a		1st place, gold medalist(s)
Lia Priyanti; Qonitah Syakuroh	Women's Double SL3–SU5	Khalimatus Sadiyah; Leani Ratri Oktila (INA); L 0–2 (6–21, 14–21)	Chanida Srinavakul; Nipada Saensupa (THA); L 1–2 (20–22, 21–14, 9–21)	Wandee Kamtam; Wathini Naramitkornburee (THA); W 2–0 (21–7, 21–13)	—N/a	3	—N/a		3rd place, bronze medalist(s)

=== Mixed ===
Athlete	Event	Group stage				Semi Final	Final	
Athlete	Event	Opposition Score	Opposition Score	Opposition Score	Rank	Opposition Score	Opposition Score	Rank
Subhan; Rina Marlina	Mixed Double SH6	Dimas Tri Aji; Yunia Widya Irianti (INA); W 2–0 (21–5, 21–15)	Chai Saeyang; Nattapong Meechai (THA); W 2–0 (21–16, 21–10)	—N/a	1	—N/a		1st place, gold medalist(s)
Dimas Tri Aji; Yunia Widya Irianti	Mixed Double SH6	Subhan; Rina Marlina (INA); L 0–2 (5–21, 15–21)	Chai Saeyang; Nattapong Meechai (THA); L 0–2 (18–21, 9–21)	—N/a	3	—N/a		3
Hikmat Ramdani; Leani Ratri Oktila	Mixed Double SL3–SU5	Basil Anthony Esolana Hermogenes; Ma. Cielo Dimain Honasan (PHI); W 2–0 (21–6, 21–8)	Chheun Tevy; Sen Vary (CAM); W 2–0; WO	Nipada Saensupa; Siripong Teamarrom (THA); W 2–0 (21–6, 21–10)	1 Q	Darunee Henpraiwan; Pricha Somsiri (THA); W 2–0 (21–5, 21–12)	Fredy Setiawan; Khalimatus Sadiyah (INA); W 2–0 (21–15, 21–19)	1st place, gold medalist(s)
Fredy Setiawan; Khalimatus Sadiyah	Mixed Double SL3–SU5	Choa Thyrith; Poch Kaolong (CAM); W 2–0 (21–6, 21–4)	Darunee Henpraiwan; Pricha Somsiri (THA); W 2–0 (21–8, 21–7)	—N/a	1 Q	Nipada Saensupa; Siripong Teamarrom (THA); W 2–0 (21–14, 21–16)	Hikmat Ramdani; Leani Ratri Oktila (INA); L 0–2 (15–21, 19–21)	2nd place, silver medalist(s)

== Boccia ==
=== Men ===
Team	Event	Group Stage					Quarterfinal	Semifinals	Final / BM	
Team	Event	Opposition Score	Opposition Score	Opposition Score	Opposition Score	Rank	Opposition Score	Opposition Score	Opposition Score	Rank
Muhamad Afrizal Syafa	Individual BC1	Willyien Cliff Honseng (MAS); W 5–4	John Iver Dhan Montiano Quintana (PHI); W 6–1	Thinnakorn Thepdaeng (THA); W 4–1	—N/a	1 Q	—N/a	Joey Eriga De Leon (PHI); W 15–0	Witsanu Huadpradit (THA); W 10–0	1st place, gold medalist(s)
Felix Ardi Yudha	Individual BC2	Sokchy Soun (CAM); W 15–1	David Dayrit Gonzaga (PHI); W 16–0	Worawut Saengampa (THA); L 0–4	—N/a	2 Q	Veasna Pril (CAM); W 11–0	Watcharaphon Vongsa (THA); L 3–3*	Muhammad Bintang Satria Herlangga (INA); W 6–2	3rd place, bronze medalist(s)
Muhammad Bintang Satria Herlangga	Individual BC2	Veasna Pril (CAM); W 8–2	Iman Haikal Saifulifram (MAS); W 11–0	—N/a		1 Q	Mohammad Syafiq Mohd Noh (MAS); W 9–1	Worawut Saengampa (THA); L 5–7	Felix Ardi Yudha (INA); L 2–6	4
Trimo Coba Kuwat	Individual BC3	Vikneshwaran Tiagarajan (MAS); W 8–2	Akadej Choochuenklin (THA); L 1–4	Gareth Ho Jing Rui (SGP); L 4–8	Aloysius Kai Hong Gan (SGP); L 2–6	4	—N/a			4
Faris Sugiarta	Individual BC4	Fendy Kurnia Pamungkas (INA); W 4–1	Ramon Reyyemanuel Galindo Apilado (PHI); W 12–2	Pornchok Larpyen (THA); L 1–7	—N/a	2 Q	—N/a	Ritthikrai Somsanuk (THA); L 2–4	Nak Vanna (CAM); W 5–3	3rd place, bronze medalist(s)
Fendy Kurnia Pamungkas	Individual BC4	Faris Sugiartan (INA); L 1–4	Pornchok Larpyen (THA); L 0–8	Ramon Reyyemanuel Galindo Apilado (PHI); W 5–4	—N/a	3	Did not advance			

=== Women ===
Team	Event	Group Stage					Quarterfinal	Semifinals	Final / BM	
Team	Event	Opposition Score	Opposition Score	Opposition Score	Opposition Score	Rank	Opposition Score	Opposition Score	Opposition Score	Rank
Handayani	Individual BC1	Sophea Meach (CAM); W 9–1	Yee Ting Jeralyn Tan (SGP); L 0–5	—N/a		2 Q	—N/a	Satanan Phromsiri (THA); L 2–5	Touny Onemouy (LAO); W 10–0	3rd place, bronze medalist(s)
Gischa Zayana	Individual BC2	Channy Keat (CAM); W 7–0	Nguyen Nhat Uyen (VIE); W 11–2	Daniella Torres Catacutan (PHI); W 8–4	—N/a	1 Q	—N/a	Sorn Sas (CAM); W 4–3	Nguyen Nhat Uyen (VIE); W 6–5	1st place, gold medalist(s)
Febriyanti Vani Rahmadhani	Individual BC2	Avrinda Anis (MAS); L 1–8	Sorn Sas (CAM); L 0–6	—N/a		3	Did not advance			
Suci Kirana Dewi	Individual BC3	Sze Ning Toh (SGP); L 1–6	Ladamanee Kla–Han (THA); W 4–3	Juthamat Rattana (THA); L 1–6	Lim Yin Xiang (MAS); W 6–1	4	—N/a			4
Wening Purbawati	Individual BC4	Noor Askuzaimey Mat Salim (MAS); L 0–12	Nuanchan Ponsila (THA); L 2–5	—N/a		3	Did not advance			

=== Mixed ===
Team	Event	Group Stage					Semifinals	Final / BM	
Team	Event	Opposition Score	Opposition Score	Opposition Score	Opposition Score	Rank	Opposition Score	Opposition Score	Rank
Suci Kirana Dewi; Trimo Coba Kuwat	Pair BC3	Aloysius Kai Hong Gan; Sze Ning Toh (SGP); W 11–0	Akkadej Choochuenklin; Ladamanee Kla–Han (THA); L 2–11	Lim Yin Xiang; Vikneshwaran Tiagarajan (MAS); W	—N/a	2	—N/a		2nd place, silver medalist(s)
Faris Sugiarta; Wening Purbawati	Pair BC4	Michelle Saniel Fernandez; Ramon Reyyemanuel Galindo Apilado (PHI); W 5–4	Nak Vanna; Sary Sourn (CAM); L 1–4	Abdul Razaq Abdul Rahman; Noor Askuzaimey Mat Salim (MAS); L 0–4	Nuanchan Phonsila; Ritthikrai Somsanuk (THA); L 0–13	4	—N/a		4
Felix Ardi Yudha; Handayani; Muhammad Bintang Satria Herlangga	Team BC1–2	Malaysia (MAS); W 14–0	Philippines (PHI); W 18–1	—N/a		1 Q	Cambodia (CAM); W 17–1	Thailand (THA); L 3–10	2nd place, silver medalist(s)

== Goalball ==
Team	Event	Group Stage					Semifinals	Final / BM	
Team	Event	Opposition Score	Opposition Score	Opposition Score	Opposition Score	Rank	Opposition Score	Opposition Score	Rank
Indonesia men's	Men's tournament	Malaysia; W 12–2	Philippines; W 14–4	—N/a		1 Q	Myanmar; W 16–6	Thailand; L 3–8	2nd place, silver medalist(s)
Indonesia women's	Women's tournament	Philippines; W 4–2	Laos; L 0–6	Malaysia; W 2–1	Thailand; L 2–4	4 Q	Thailand; L 0–10	Malaysia; L 0–3	4

=== Men's tournament ===
==== Group B ====
Pos	Team	Pld	W	L	PF	PA	PD	Pts	Qualification
1	Indonesia (INA)	2	2	0	26	6	+20	4	Qualified for the Semifinals
2	Malaysia (MAS)	2	1	1	15	15	0	3	Qualified for the Semifinals
3	Philippines (PHI)	2	0	2	7	27	−20	2	

Source: APG 2023

4 June 2023; 13:00	Indonesia	12–2	Malaysia	Morodok Techo National Stadium

5 June 2023; 11:40	Indonesia	14–4	Philippines	Morodok Techo National Stadium

=== Knockout stage ===
==== Bracket ====
Semifinals
7 June
Indonesia	16
Myanmar	6
7 June
Thailand	10
Malaysia	0

Gold medal match
8 June
Indonesia	3
Thailand	8
Bronze medal match
8 June
Myanmar	14
Malaysia	4

=== Women's tournament ===
==== Group Stage ====
Pos	Team	Pld	W	L	PF	PA	PD	Pts	Qualification
1	Thailand (THA)	4	4	0	25	4	+21	8	Qualified for the Gold medal match
2	Malaysia (MAS)	4	2	2	20	13	+7	6	Qualified for the Gold medal match
3	Laos (LAO)	4	2	2	22	19	+3	6	Qualified for the Bronze medal match
4	Indonesia (INA)	4	2	2	8	13	−5	6	Qualified for the Bronze medal match
5	Philippines (PHI)	4	0	4	9	35	−26	4	

Source: APG 2023

4 June 2023; 11:40	Indonesia	4–2	Philippines	Morodok Techo National Stadium

4 June 2023; 15:40	Indonesia	0–6	Laos	Morodok Techo National Stadium

5 June 2023; 13:00	Indonesia	2–1	Malaysia	Morodok Techo National Stadium

6 June 2023; 11:40	Indonesia	2–4	Thailand	Morodok Techo National Stadium

=== Knockout stage ===
==== Bracket ====
Semifinals
7 June
Thailand	10
Indonesia	0
7 June
Malaysia	0
Laos	2

Gold medal match
8 June
Thailand	2
Laos	0
Bronze medal match
8 June
Indonesia	0
Malaysia	3

== Powerlifting ==
=== Men ===
Athlete	Event	Best lift	Rank	Total	Rank
Abdul Hadi	–49kg	166	2nd place, silver medalist(s)	489	2nd place, silver medalist(s)
Nur Irmansyah	–49kg	125	3rd place, bronze medalist(s)	362	3rd place, bronze medalist(s)
Margono	–65kg	161	1st place, gold medalist(s)	467	1st place, gold medalist(s)
Tambi Sibarani	–80kg	172	3rd place, bronze medalist(s)	172	6
Andika Eka Jaya	–88kg	176	2nd place, silver medalist(s)	176	3rd place, bronze medalist(s)
Atmaji Priambodo	–97kg	187	1st place, gold medalist(s)	552	1st place, gold medalist(s)

=== Women ===
Athlete	Event	Best lift	Rank	Total	Rank
Eneng Paridah	–41kg	75	1st place, gold medalist(s)	146	3rd place, bronze medalist(s)
Ni Nengah Widiasih	–45kg	99	1st place, gold medalist(s)	293	1st place, gold medalist(s)
Rani Puji Astuti	–61kg	100	1st place, gold medalist(s)	285	1st place, gold medalist(s)
Shebrioni	–67kg	105	1st place, gold medalist(s)	308	1st place, gold medalist(s)
Nurtani Purba	–73kg	106	2nd place, silver medalist(s)	206	3rd place, bronze medalist(s)
Siti Mahmudah	–79kg	103	1st place, gold medalist(s)	298	1st place, gold medalist(s)
Dwiska Afrilia Maharani	–79kg	84	2nd place, silver medalist(s)	242	2nd place, silver medalist(s)
Ni Nengah Widiasih	–86kg	86	1st place, gold medalist(s)	248	1st place, gold medalist(s)
Sriyanti	+86kg	115	1st place, gold medalist(s)	338	1st place, gold medalist(s)
Elsa Dewi Saputri	+86kg	106	2nd place, silver medalist(s)	294	2nd place, silver medalist(s)

== Sitting volleyball ==
Team	Event	Group Stage					Semifinals	Final / BM	
Team	Event	Opposition Score	Opposition Score	Opposition Score	Opposition Score	Rank	Opposition Score	Opposition Score	Rank
Indonesia men's	Men's tournament	Myanmar; W 3–1	Thailand; L 0–3	Philippines; W 3–0	Cambodia; L 0–3	3 Q	Cambodia; W 3–2	Thailand; L 2–3	2nd place, silver medalist(s)
Indonesia women's	Women's tournament	Thailand; W 3–0	Cambodia; W 3–0	Thailand; W 3–0	Cambodia; W 3–0	1	—N/a		1st place, gold medalist(s)

=== Men's tournament ===
Semifinal

14:00, June 7, 2023

Indonesia	3–2	Cambodia

Morodok Techo National Stadium

Final

11:00, June 8, 2023

Indonesia	2–3	Thailand

Morodok Techo National Stadium

== Wheelchair basketball ==
=== Men's ===
Team	Event	Group Stage					Final / BM	
Team	Event	Opposition Score	Opposition Score	Opposition Score	Opposition Score	Rank	Opposition Score	Rank
Indonesia men's	3x3 tournament	Philippines; L 5–11	Malaysia; L 9–11	Thailand; L 5–19	Cambodia; L 9–10	5	Did not advance	
Indonesia men's	5x5 tournament	Philippines; L 34–73	Malaysia; L 36–65	Thailand; L 26–81	Cambodia; W 66–49	4	Malaysia; L 40–74	4

==== 3x3 tournament ====
Pos	Team	Pld	W	L	PF	PA	PD	Pts	Qualification
1	Thailand (THA)	4	4	0	70	31	+39	8	Qualified for the Gold medal match
2	Philippines (PHI)	4	3	1	39	35	+4	7	Qualified for the Gold medal match
3	Malaysia (MAS)	4	2	2	42	41	+1	6	Qualified for the Bronze medal match
4	Cambodia (CAM) (H)	4	1	3	29	50	−21	5	Qualified for the Bronze medal match
5	Indonesia (INA)	4	0	4	28	51	−23	4	

Source: APG 2023
(H) Hosts

June 2, 2023

Indonesia	5–11	Philippines

Morodok Techo National Stadium

June 2, 2023

Indonesia	9–11	Malaysia

Morodok Techo National Stadium

June 2, 2023

Indonesia	5–19	Thailand

Morodok Techo National Stadium

June 2, 2023

Cambodia	10–9	Indonesia

Morodok Techo National Stadium

==== 5x5 tournament ====
Pos	Team	Pld	W	L	PF	PA	PD	Pts	Qualification
1	Thailand (THA)	4	4	0	313	121	+192	8	Qualified for the Gold medal match
2	Philippines (PHI)	4	3	1	237	177	+60	7	Qualified for the Gold medal match
3	Malaysia (MAS)	4	2	2	227	165	+62	6	Qualified for the Bronze medal match
4	Indonesia (INA)	4	1	3	162	268	−106	5	Qualified for the Bronze medal match
5	Cambodia (CAM) (H)	4	0	4	139	327	−188	4	

Source: APG 2023
(H) Hosts

June 4, 2023

Indonesia	34–73	Philippines

Morodok Techo National Stadium

June 5, 2023

Malaysia	65–36	Indonesia

Morodok Techo National Stadium

June 6, 2023

Indonesia	26–81	Thailand

Morodok Techo National Stadium

June 6, 2023

Cambodia	49–66	Indonesia

Morodok Techo National Stadium

Bronze medal match

10:30, June 7, 2023

Malaysia	74–40	Indonesia

Morodok Techo National Stadium
