= Table tennis at the 2016 Summer Paralympics – Men's individual – Class 6 =

Table tennis at the XV Paralympic Games
- Venue: Riocentro Pavilion 3
- Dates: 8–12 September 2016
- Competitors: 15 from 11 nations

Medalists
1st place, gold medalist(s)		Peter Rosenmeier	Denmark
2nd place, silver medalist(s)		Álvaro Valera	Spain
3rd place, bronze medalist(s)		Rungroj Thainiyom	Thailand

The men's individual table tennis – Class 6 tournament at the 2016 Summer Paralympics in Rio de Janeiro took place from 7 to 18 September 2016 at Riocentro Pavilion 3. Classes 6–10 are for athletes with a physical impairment who compete from a standing position; the lower the number, the greater the impact the impairment has on an athlete's ability to compete.

In the preliminary stage, athletes competed in five groups of three. Winners and runners-up of each group qualified for the next stage.

== Results ==
All times are local time in UTC-3.

=== Final rounds ===
Semi-finals
A1	Alvaro Valera (ESP)	11	11	10	11
C1	Rungroj Thainiyom (THA)	3	9	12	3
E1	Park Hong-Kyu (KOR)	9	4	11	6
B1	Peter Rosenmeier (DEN)	11	11	7	11

Final
A1	Alvaro Valera (ESP)	11	10	11	9	6
B1	Peter Rosenmeier (DEN)	5	12	6	11	11
Bronze medal match
C1	Rungroj Thainiyom (THA)	11	11	11
E1	Park Hong-Kyu (KOR)	4	4	4

==== Top half ====
Round of 16						Quarter-finals							Semi-finals
						A1	Alvaro Valera (ESP)	9	10	12	11	11
D2	David Wetherill (GBR)	11	11	4	11	D2	David Wetherill (GBR)	11	12	10	8	8
E2	Matias Pino (CHI)	9	7	11	9								A1	Alvaro Valera (ESP)	11	11	10	11
													C1	Rungroj Thainiyom (THA)	3	9	12	3
						B2	Alberto Seoane Alcaraz (ESP)	7	9	11	11	7
						C1	Rungroj Thainiyom (THA)	11	11	4	9	11

==== Bottom half ====
Round of 16							Quarter-finals					Semi-finals
							D1	Thomas Rau (GER)	3	7	6
							E1	Park Hong-Kyu (KOR)	11	11	11
												E1	Park Hong-Kyu (KOR)	9	4	11	6
A2	Bobi Simion (ROU)	11	16	8	7	11						B1	Peter Rosenmeier (DEN)	11	11	7	11
C2	Michal Jensen (DEN)	7	14	11	11	5	A2	Bobi Simion (ROU)	6	8	5
							B1	Peter Rosenmeier (DEN)	11	11	11

=== Preliminary round ===
Qualified for the quarter-finals

==== Group A ====
Athlete	Won	Lost	Games diff	Points diff
Alvaro Valera (ESP)	2	0	+6	+33
Bobi Simion (ROU)	1	1	-2	-4
Cristián Dettoni (CHI)	0	2	-4	-29

8 September, 11:40

Alvaro Valera (ESP)	11	11	11
Cristián Dettoni (CHI)	3	2	6

9 September, 11:00

Alvaro Valera (ESP)	16	11	12
Bobi Simion (ROU)	14	4	10

9 September, 18:40

Bobi Simion (ROU)	7	11	9	11	11
Cristián Dettoni (CHI)	11	6	11	7	7

==== Group B ====
Athlete	Won	Lost	Games diff	Points diff
Peter Rosenmeier (DEN)	2	0	+5	+34
Alberto Seoane Alcaraz (ESP)	1	1	-1	-18
Raimondo Alecci (ITA)	0	2	-4	-16

8 September, 12:20

Peter Rosenmeier (DEN)	11	11	11
Raimondo Alecci (ITA)	8	4	5

9 September, 11:00

Peter Rosenmeier (DEN)	11	9	11	11
Alberto Seoane Alcaraz (ESP)	2	11	8	3

9 September, 18:40

Alberto Seoane Alcaraz (ESP)	8	11	13	6	11
Raimondo Alecci (ITA)	11	8	11	11	8

==== Group C ====
Athlete	Won	Lost	Games diff	Points diff
Rungroj Thainiyom (THA)	2	0	+6	+29
Michal Jensen (DEN)	1	1	-1	-13
Danny Bobrov (ISR)	0	2	-5	-16

8 September, 12:20

Rungroj Thainiyom (THA)	11	11	11
Michal Jensen (DEN)	5	6	4

9 September, 11:40

Rungroj Thainiyom (THA)	11	11	14
Danny Bobrov (ISR)	8	5	12

9 September, 18:40

Danny Bobrov (ISR)	9	10	19	8
Michal Jensen (DEN)	11	12	17	11

==== Group D ====
Athlete	Won	Lost	Games diff	Points diff
Thomas Rau (GER)	2	0	+6	+30
David Wetherill (GBR)	1	1	0	+5
Ibrahim Hamadtou (EGY)	0	2	-6	-35

8 September, 12:20

David Wetherill (GBR)	11	11	11
Ibrahim Hamadtou (EGY)	5	7	5

9 September, 11:40

David Wetherill (GBR)	7	10	6
Thomas Rau (GER)	11	12	11

9 September, 19:20

Thomas Rau (GER)	11	11	11
Ibrahim Hamadtou (EGY)	4	6	4

==== Group E ====
Athlete	Won	Lost	Games diff	Points diff
Park Hong-Kyu (KOR)	2	0	+2	-4
Matias Pino (CHI)	1	1	0	-5
Paul Karabardak (GBR)	0	2	-2	+9

8 September, 12:20

Park Hong-Kyu (KOR)	11	11	5	6	11
Matias Pino (CHI)	3	5	11	11	9

9 September, 11:40

Park Hong-Kyu (KOR)	2	12	4	12	11
Paul Karabardak (GBR)	11	10	11	10	8

9 September, 19:20

Paul Karabardak (GBR)	11	11	9	9	8
Matias Pino (CHI)	7	8	11	11	11
