= Equestrian at the 2016 Summer Paralympics – Individual championship test grade Ib =

Equestrian – Individual championship test, grade Ib at the XV Paralympic Games
- Competitors: 11 from 11 nations
- Winning score: 75.103

Medalists
| 1st place, gold medalist(s) | | Pepo Puch | Austria |
| 2nd place, silver medalist(s) | | Lee Pearson | Great Britain |
| 3rd place, bronze medalist(s) | | Stinna Kaastrup | Denmark |

The individual championship test, grade Ib, para-equestrian dressage event at the 2016 Summer Paralympics was contested on 2 September in Rio de Janeiro.

The competition was assessed by a ground jury composed of five judges placed at locations designated E, H, C, M, and B. Each judge rated the competitors' performances with a percentage score. The five scores from the jury were then averaged to determine a rider's total percentage score.

== Results ==
Individual championship test - Class 1b
| Rank | Rider | Horse | Team | Scores | | | | | Final Total |
| Rank | Rider | Horse | Team | E | H | C | M | B | Final Total |
|---|---|---|---|---|---|---|---|---|---|
| 1st place, gold medalist(s) | Pepo Puch | on FONTAINENOIR | Austria | 74.655 | 75.517 | 76.034 | 74.655 | 74.655 | 75.103 |
| 2nd place, silver medalist(s) | Lee Pearson | on ZION | Great Britain | 73.966 | 76.207 | 74.310 | 73.448 | 72.586 | 74.103 |
| 3rd place, bronze medalist(s) | Stinna Kaastrup | on SMARTIES | Denmark | 76.207 | 75.345 | 72.931 | 72.414 | 72.931 | 73.966 |
| 4 | Nicole den Dulk | on WALLACE | Netherlands | 71.897 | 72.931 | 70.000 | 70.862 | 69.828 | 71.103 |
| 5 | Alina Rosenberg | on NEA'S DABOUN | Germany | 69.310 | 70.690 | 72.931 | 70.000 | 71.897 | 70.966 |
| 6 | Marcos Alves | on VLADIMIR | Brazil | 69.138 | 70.172 | 67.586 | 69.138 | 68.448 | 68.897 |
| 7 | Sydney Collier | on WESTERN ROSE | United States | 68.793 | 69.828 | 67.414 | 66.207 | 66.034 | 67.655 |
| 8 | Celine Gerny | on FLINT | France | 68.276 | 70.172 | 66.724 | 65.517 | 67.069 | 67.552 |
| 9 | Ashley Gowanlock | on DI SCANSANO | Canada | 64.310 | 66.724 | 66.034 | 63.448 | 65.000 | 65.103 |
| 10 | Maximillian Tan | on DON'S DAY DREAM | Singapore | 62.069 | 59.310 | 62.414 | 58.966 | 56.552 | 59.862 |
| 11 | Mitsuhide Miyaji | on BANDERO | Japan | 62.241 | 58.966 | 57.759 | 56.379 | 59.483 | 58.966 |
| Ground Jury: | | | | | | | | | |
| E | Marc Urban | | Belgium | | | | | | |
| H | Anne Prain | | France | | | | | | |
| C | Marco Orsini | | Germany, | | | | | | |
| M | Kjell Myhre | | Norway | | | | | | |
| B | Alison King | | Hong Kong | | | | | | |
