= Thirayu Chueawong =

Thai para table tennis player

Personal information
- Born: 22 December 1998 (age 27) Ratchaburi, Thailand

Sport
- Sport: Table tennis
- Disability class: 2
- Highest ranking: 37 (September 2021)
- Current ranking: 37
Medal record
Men's para table tennis
Representing Thailand
Paralympic Games
Bronze medal – third place	2020 Tokyo	Teams C3
Asian Para Games
Bronze medal – third place	2022 Hangzhou	Singles C2
ASEAN Para Games
Gold medal – first place	2023 Phnom Penh	Singles C3
Silver medal – second place	2023 Phnom Penh	Doubles C1-3

Thirayu Chueawong (Thai: ถิรายุ เชื้อวงษ์; born 22 December 1998) is a Thai para table tennis player. He won a bronze medal in the team class 3 event at the 2020 Summer Paralympics.
