= Badminton at the 2023 ASEAN Para Games =

- Venue: Morodok Techo National Sports Complex Badminton Hall
- Location: Phnom Penh, Cambodia
- Dates: 3–9 June 2023

Badminton at the 2023 ASEAN Para Games was held at Badminton Hall, Morodok Techo National Sports Complex in Phnom Penh, Cambodia

== Classification ==
There were six different classes in the competition.

| Class | Description |
|---|---|
| WH1 | Athletes who have impairment in both lower limbs and trunk and/or have high spinal cord injuries. They may also have impaired hand function which could impact the ability to manoeuvre in their wheelchair. Their playing style is by holding their wheelchair with one hand while the other hand is moving the racquet; they will push or pull themselves to a neutral wheelchair sitting position after the stroke. |
| WH2 | Similar to WH1 athletes, WH2 athletes have one or more impairments in their lower limbs, one or more loss of legs (above the knee) and would have minimal or no trunk impairment and/or lower . They would move their wheelchairs quicker than WH1 athletes and they will hold onto their wheels less to maintain their balance. |
| SL3 | Athletes would have impairment in one or both lower limbs and have poor walking/running balance: to reduce their impairment, they would often compete on half-court (lengthwise). These athletes would have cerebral palsy, bilateral polio or loss of both legs below the knee. |
| SL4 | Athletes would run faster and have better balance than athletes who are in the SL3 class, they would have an impairment in one or both lower limbs, unilateral polio or mild cerebral palsy. These athletes would play on full-court. |
| SU5 | Unlike the SL3 and SL4 sport classes, SU5 have impairments in their upper limbs such as a missing thumb which restricts grip and power of the stroke or loss of an arm due to amputation or nerve damage. Also, athletes may have a severe impairment to their non-playing arm which can affect balance movements, trunk rotation and ability to serve. |
| SH6 | Athletes who have achondroplasia and short stature. |

== Medal summary ==
* Host nation (Cambodia)

| Rank | Nation | Gold | Silver | Bronze | Total |
|---|---|---|---|---|---|
| 1 | Indonesia (INA) | 13 | 9 | 8 | 30 |
| 2 | Thailand (THA) | 7 | 11 | 11 | 29 |
| 3 | Malaysia (MAS) | 3 | 1 | 6 | 10 |
| 4 | Vietnam (VIE) | 0 | 1 | 1 | 2 |
| 5 | Cambodia (CAM)* | 0 | 0 | 2 | 2 |
| 5 | Philippines (PHI) | 0 | 0 | 2 | 2 |
| 7 | Singapore (SGP) | 0 | 0 | 1 | 1 |
| Totals (7 entries) | | 23 | 22 | 31 | 76 |

== Medalists ==
=== Men ===
| Event | Class | Gold | Silver | Bronze |
|---|---|---|---|---|
| Singles | WH1 | Muhammad Ikhwan Ramli; Malaysia | Jakarin Homhual; Thailand | Chew Jit Thye; Malaysia |
| Singles | WH1 | Muhammad Ikhwan Ramli; Malaysia | Jakarin Homhual; Thailand | Chatchai Kornpeekanok; Thailand |
| Singles | WH2 | Supriadi; Indonesia | Wiwin Andri; Indonesia | Agus Budi Utomo; Indonesia |
| Singles | WH2 | Supriadi; Indonesia | Wiwin Andri; Indonesia | Dumnern Junthong; Thailand |
| Singles | SL3 | Mongkhon Bunsun; Thailand | Maman Nurjaman; Indonesia | Ukun Rukaendi; Indonesia |
| Singles | SL3 | Mongkhon Bunsun; Thailand | Maman Nurjaman; Indonesia | Muhammad Huzairi Abdul Malek; Malaysia |
| Singles | SL4 | Mohd Amin Burhanuddin; Malaysia | Hikmat Ramdani; Indonesia | Fredy Setiawan; Indonesia |
| Singles | SL4 | Mohd Amin Burhanuddin; Malaysia | Hikmat Ramdani; Indonesia | Chawarat Kittichokwattana; Thailand |
| Singles | SU5 | Dheva Anrimusthi; Indonesia | Suryo Nugroho; Indonesia | Oddie Kurnia Dwi Listyanto Putra; Indonesia |
| Singles | SU5 | Dheva Anrimusthi; Indonesia | Suryo Nugroho; Indonesia | Tay Wei Ming; Singapore |
| Singles | SH6 | Nattapong Meechai; Thailand | Subhan; Indonesia | Dimas Tri Aji; Indonesia |
| Singles | SH6 | Nattapong Meechai; Thailand | Subhan; Indonesia | Muhammad Amin Azmi; Malaysia |
| Doubles | WH1–2 | Malaysia; Muhammad Ikhwan Ramli; Noor Azwan Noorlan | Thailand; Jakarin Homhual; Dumnern Junthong | Indonesia; Agung Widodo; Supriadi |
| Doubles | WH1–2 | Malaysia; Muhammad Ikhwan Ramli; Noor Azwan Noorlan | Thailand; Jakarin Homhual; Dumnern Junthong | Malaysia; Chew Jit Thye; Ashley Iranaeus Jeck |
| Doubles | SL3–4 | Indonesia; Hary Susanto; Ukun Rukaendi | Indonesia; Dwiyoko; Fredy Setiawan | Thailand; Mongkhon Bunsun; Chawarat Kittichokwattana |
| Doubles | SL3–4 | Indonesia; Hary Susanto; Ukun Rukaendi | Indonesia; Dwiyoko; Fredy Setiawan | Thailand; Singha Sangnil; Siripong Teamarrom |
| Doubles | SU5 | Indonesia; Dheva Anrimusthi; Hafiz Briliansyah Prawiranegara | Indonesia; Oddie Kurnia Dwi Listyanto Putra; Suryo Nugroho | Malaysia; Mohd Faris Azri; Muhammad Fareez Anuar |
| Doubles | SU5 | Indonesia; Dheva Anrimusthi; Hafiz Briliansyah Prawiranegara | Indonesia; Oddie Kurnia Dwi Listyanto Putra; Suryo Nugroho | Malaysia; Amyrul Yazid Ahmad Sibi; Mohd Amin Burhanuddin |
| Doubles | SH6 | Indonesia; Dimas Tri Aji; Subhan | Thailand; Nattapong Meechai; Bunthan Yaemmali | Cambodia; Pay Veasna; Veng Ve |
| Team standing | | Indonesia; Dheva Anrimusthi; Fredy Setiawan; Hafizh Briliansyah Prawiranegara; Hary Susanto; Ukun Rukaendi; Suryo Nugroho | Malaysia; Muhammad Amin Burhanuddin; Mohamad Faris Ahmad Azri; Muhamad Zulfatihi Jaafar; Muhammad Fareez Anuar; Amirul Yazid Ahmad Sibi; Muhammad Huzairi Abdul Malek | Thailand; Watcharaphon Chok-uthaikul; Chawarat Kitichokwattana; Pricha Somsiri; Siripong Teamarrom; Nattphon Thaweesap |
| Team WH | | Thailand; Jakarin Homhual; Apichat Sumpradit; Chatchai Kornpeekanok; Dumnern Junthong; Anuwat Sriboran | Not awarded | Not awarded |

=== Women ===
| Event | Class | Gold | Silver | Bronze |
|---|---|---|---|---|
| Singles | WH1 | Sujirat Pookkham; Thailand | Piyawan Thinjun; Thailand | Wanlapa Pinchai; Thailand |
| Singles | WH2 | Amnouy Wetwithan; Thailand | Hoàng Thị Hồng Thảo; Vietnam | Paz Enano Lita; Philippines |
| Singles | WH2 | Amnouy Wetwithan; Thailand | Hoàng Thị Hồng Thảo; Vietnam | Lê Thị Thu Hiền; Vietnam |
| Singles | SL3 | Qonitah Ikhtiar Syakuroh; Indonesia | Darunee Henpraiwan; Thailand | Chha Sreyneang; Cambodia |
| Singles | SL3 | Qonitah Ikhtiar Syakuroh; Indonesia | Darunee Henpraiwan; Thailand | Wandee Kantam; Thailand |
| Singles | SL4 | Leani Ratri Oktila; Indonesia | Khalimatus Sadiyah; Indonesia | Chanida Srinavakul; Thailand |
| Singles | SU5 | Warining Rahayu; Indonesia | Wathini Naramaitkornburee; Thailand | Not awarded |
| Singles | SH6 | Rina Marlina; Indonesia | Chai Saeyang; Thailand | Yunia Widya Irianti; Indonesia |
| Doubles | WH1–2 | Thailand; Sujirat Pookkham; Amnouy Wetwithan | Thailand; Wanlapa Pinchai; Piyawan Thinjun | Philippines; Gloria Grace Nalgom Nadawa; Paz Enano Lita |
| Doubles | SL3–SU5 | Indonesia; Leani Ratri Oktila; Khalimatus Sadiyah | Thailand; Chanida Srinavakul; Nipada Saensupa | Indonesia; Lia Priyanti; Qonitah Ikhtiar Syakuroh |

=== Mixed ===
| Event | Class | Gold | Silver | Bronze |
|---|---|---|---|---|
| Doubles | WH1–2 | Thailand; Jakarin Homhual; Sujirat Pookkham | Thailand; Dumnern Junthong; Amnouy Wetwithan | Not awarded |
| Doubles | SL3–SU5 | Indonesia; Hikmat Ramdani; Leani Ratri Oktila | Indonesia; Fredy Setiawan; Khalimatus Sadiyah | Thailand; Pricha Somsiri; Darunee Henpraiwan |
| Doubles | SL3–SU5 | Indonesia; Hikmat Ramdani; Leani Ratri Oktila | Indonesia; Fredy Setiawan; Khalimatus Sadiyah | Thailand; Siripong Teamarrom; Nipida Saensupa |
| Doubles | SH6 | Indonesia; Subhan; Rina Marlina | Thailand; Chai Saeyang; Nattapong Meechai | Not awarded |

== See also ==
- Badminton at the 2023 Southeast Asian Games
