= Table tennis at the 2023 ASEAN Para Games =

- Venue: Morodok Techo National Sports Complex Table Tennis Hall
- Date: 4–8 June 2023

Table tennis at the 2023 ASEAN Para Games was held at Morodok Techo Table Tennis Hall in Phnom Penh, Cambodia from 4–8 June 2023.

== Medal tally ==
* Host nation (Cambodia)

Rank	Nation	Gold	Silver	Bronze	Total
1	Indonesia (INA)	31	16	17	64
2	Thailand (THA)	20	25	18	63
3	Malaysia (MAS)	2	3	1	6
4	Vietnam (VIE)	0	2	12	14
5	Philippines (PHI)	0	1	10	11
6	Singapore (SGP)	0	1	3	4
7	Cambodia (CAM)*	0	0	7	7
8	Timor-Leste (TLS)	0	0	3	3
Totals (8 entries)		53	48	71	172

== Medalists ==
=== Men ===
Event	Class	Gold	Silver	Bronze
Singles	TT2	Thirayu Chueawong; Thailand	Audy Ngangi; Indonesia	Natthawut Thinathet; Thailand
Singles	TT2	Thirayu Chueawong; Thailand	Audy Ngangi; Indonesia	Rodrick Li Zhi Xian; Singapore
Singles	TT3	Yuttajak Glinbancheun; Thailand	Anurak Laowong; Thailand	Sefrianto; Indonesia
Singles	TT3	Yuttajak Glinbancheun; Thailand	Anurak Laowong; Thailand	Busree Wawaeni; Thailand
Singles	TT4	Yayang Gunaya; Indonesia	Adyos Astan; Indonesia	Sunarto; Indonesia
Singles	TT4	Yayang Gunaya; Indonesia	Adyos Astan; Indonesia	Wanchai Chaiwut; Thailand
Singles	TT5	Tatok Hardiyanto; Indonesia	Norakan Chanphaka; Thailand	Barce Eysntend Layaba; Indonesia
Singles	TT5	Tatok Hardiyanto; Indonesia	Norakan Chanphaka; Thailand	Teeradech Klangmanee; Thailand
Singles	TT6	Rungroj Thainiyom; Thailand	Varly Jerico Tilaar; Indonesia	Rahmad Hidayat; Indonesia
Singles	TT6	Rungroj Thainiyom; Thailand	Varly Jerico Tilaar; Indonesia	Paulo da Silva Neves; Timor-Leste
Singles	TT7	Chalermpong Punpoo; Thailand	Suriyone Thapaeng; Thailand	Enceng Mustopa; Indonesia
Singles	TT7	Chalermpong Punpoo; Thailand	Suriyone Thapaeng; Thailand	Nguyễn Thanh Bình; Vietnam
Singles	TT8	Mohamad Rian Prahasta; Indonesia	Phisit Wangphonphathanasiri; Thailand	Banyu Tri Mulyo; Indonesia
Singles	TT8	Mohamad Rian Prahasta; Indonesia	Phisit Wangphonphathanasiri; Thailand	Leonardo Aritonang; Indonesia
Singles	TT9	Kusnanto; Indonesia	Aman Suratman; Indonesia	Chee Chaoming; Malaysia
Singles	TT9	Kusnanto; Indonesia	Aman Suratman; Indonesia	Linard Combras Sultan; Philippines
Singles	TT10	Komet Akbar; Indonesia	Bunpot Sillapakong; Thailand	Phitak Kankingkam; Thailand
Singles	TT10	Komet Akbar; Indonesia	Bunpot Sillapakong; Thailand	Rommel Patombon Lucencio; Philippines
Singles	TT11	Muhammad Alfigo Dwiputra; Indonesia	Jennahtul Fahmi Ahmad Jennah; Malaysia	Narawit Techo; Thailand
Singles	TT11	Muhammad Alfigo Dwiputra; Indonesia	Jennahtul Fahmi Ahmad Jennah; Malaysia	Achmad Yusuf; Indonesia
Doubles	TT1-3	Thailand; Anurak Laowong; Yuttajak Glinbancheun	Thailand; Busree Wawaeni; Thirayu Chueawong	Cambodia; Nhansamoth Ek; Nuch Pov
Doubles	TT1-3	Thailand; Anurak Laowong; Yuttajak Glinbancheun	Thailand; Busree Wawaeni; Thirayu Chueawong	Indonesia; Cahyo Pambudi; Sefrianto
Doubles	TT4	Indonesia; Adyos Astan; Yayang Gunaya	Thailand; Kittinan Harnpichai; Wanchai Chaiwut	Philippines; Racleo Candila Martinez Jr; Smith Billy Anonoy Caratera
Doubles	TT4	Indonesia; Adyos Astan; Yayang Gunaya	Thailand; Kittinan Harnpichai; Wanchai Chaiwut	Cambodia; Kosal Yoy; Sopheap Phoeun
Doubles	TT5	Indonesia; Barce Eysntend Layaba; Tatok Hardiyanto	Thailand; Norakan Chanphaka; Teeradech Klangmanee	Vietnam; Nguyễn Bá An; Trần Văn Thắng
Doubles	TT6-7	Thailand; Chalermpong Punpoo; Rungroj Thainiyom	Indonesia; Enceng Mustopa; Rahmad Hidayat	Vietnam; Đặng Thế Cần; Nguyễn Thanh Bình
Doubles	TT8	Indonesia; Banyu Tri Mulyo; Mohamad Rian Prahasta	Thailand; Komkrit Charitsat; Phisit Wangphonphathanasiri	Indonesia; Leonardo Aritonang; Varly Jerico Tilaar
Doubles	TT8	Indonesia; Banyu Tri Mulyo; Mohamad Rian Prahasta	Thailand; Komkrit Charitsat; Phisit Wangphonphathanasiri	Vietnam; Đỗ Trường Anh; Phạm Văn Hoàng
Doubles	TT9	Malaysia; Brady Chin Zi Rong; Chee Chaoming	Philippines; Benedicto Hernandez Gaela; Linard Combras Sultan	Indonesia; Aman Suratman; Kusnanto
Doubles	TT9	Malaysia; Brady Chin Zi Rong; Chee Chaoming	Philippines; Benedicto Hernandez Gaela; Linard Combras Sultan	Vietnam; Phạm Minh Tuấn; Phạm Thế Tiến
Doubles	TT10	Indonesia; Hilmi Aziz; Komet Akbar	not awarded	
Team	TT1-3	Thailand; Anurak Laowong; Busree Wawaeni; Yuttajak Glinbancheun	Indonesia; Andi Santoso; Audy Ngangi; Cahyo Pambudi	Cambodia; Dy Neak; Nhansamoth Ek; Nuch Pov
Team	TT1-3	Thailand; Anurak Laowong; Busree Wawaeni; Yuttajak Glinbancheun	Indonesia; Andi Santoso; Audy Ngangi; Cahyo Pambudi	Singapore; Muhammad Dinie Asyraf Huzaini; Rodrick Li Zhi Xian
Team	TT4	Indonesia; Adyos Astan; Sunarto; Yayang Gunaya	Thailand; Kittinan Harnpichai; Paisol Pateh; Wanchai Chaiwut	Philippines; Racleo Candila Martinez Jr; Smith Billy Anonoy Caratera
Team	TT5	Indonesia; Barce Eysntend Layaba; Sefrianto; Tatok Hardiyanto	Thailand; Norakan Chanphaka; Teeradech Klangmanee; Thirayu Chueawong	Vietnam; Nguyễn Bá An; Trần Văn Thắng
Team	TT6-7	Thailand; Phitsadan Oiuyen; Rungroj Thainiyom; Suriyone Thapaeng	Indonesia; Enceng Mustopa; Rahmad Hidayat; Varly Jerico Tilaar	Vietnam; Đặng Thế Cần; Nguyễn Thanh Bình
Team	TT8	Indonesia; Banyu Tri Mulyo; Mohamad Rian Prahasta; Leonardo Aritonang	Thailand; Chalermpong Punpoo; Komkrit Charitsat; Phisit Wangphonphathanasiri	Vietnam; Đỗ Trường Anh; Phạm Văn Hoàng
Team	TT8	Indonesia; Banyu Tri Mulyo; Mohamad Rian Prahasta; Leonardo Aritonang	Thailand; Chalermpong Punpoo; Komkrit Charitsat; Phisit Wangphonphathanasiri	Philippines; Jayson Combe Ocampo; Jobert Aparri Lumanta; Leo Abulencia Macalanda
Team	TT9	Malaysia; Brady Chin Zi Rong; Chee Chaoming	Indonesia; Aman Suratman; Kusnanto	not awarded
Team	TT10	Thailand; Bunpot Sillapakong; Molchai Melanon; Phitak Kankingkam	Indonesia; Hilmi Aziz; Komet Akbar	not awarded

=== Women ===
Event	Class	Gold	Silver	Bronze
Singles	TT1-2	Chilchitparyak Bootwansirina; Thailand	Claire Toh Shu Min; Singapore	not awarded
Singles	TT3	Dararat Asayut; Thailand	Pattaravadee Wararitdamrongkul; Thailand	Patamawadee Intanon; Thailand
Singles	TT3	Dararat Asayut; Thailand	Pattaravadee Wararitdamrongkul; Thailand	Osrita Muslim; Indonesia
Singles	TT4	Wijittra Jaion; Thailand	Wassana Srigam; Thailand	Tarsilem; Indonesia
Singles	TT4	Wijittra Jaion; Thailand	Wassana Srigam; Thailand	Saroung Sorn; Cambodia
Singles	TT5	Leli Marlina; Indonesia	Panwas Singam; Thailand	Nam Yuok; Cambodia
Singles	TT5	Leli Marlina; Indonesia	Panwas Singam; Thailand	Supalak Butgunha; Thailand
Singles	TT6	Kanokporn Phathumchai; Thailand	Supannee Kokaew; Thailand	not awarded
Singles	TT7	Siti Fadhillah; Indonesia	not awarded	
Singles	TT8	Suwarti; Indonesia	Sumalee Suangtho; Thailand	Kanlaya Chaiwut; Thailand
Singles	TT8	Suwarti; Indonesia	Sumalee Suangtho; Thailand	Hamida; Indonesia
Singles	TT9	Hana Resti; Indonesia	Imas Yuniar; Indonesia	Chayanan Settisrikoedkun; Thailand
Singles	TT9	Hana Resti; Indonesia	Imas Yuniar; Indonesia	Nguyễn Thị Hoa Phượng; Vietnam
Singles	TT10	Sella Dwi Radayana; Indonesia	Gloria Gracia Wong Sze; Malaysia	Việt Thị Kim Vân; Vietnam
Singles	TT10	Sella Dwi Radayana; Indonesia	Gloria Gracia Wong Sze; Malaysia	Intira Chapandung; Thailand
Singles	TT11	Ana Widyasari; Indonesia	Metri; Indonesia	Pronwimol Wangprachum; Thailand
Doubles	TT1-3	Thailand; Dararat Asayut; Pattaravadee Wararitdamrongkul	not awarded	
Doubles	TT4	Thailand; Wassana Srigam; Wijittra Jaion	Indonesia; Ida Yany; Osrita Muslim	Cambodia; Chariya Chhorn; Saroung Sorn
Doubles	TT5	Indonesia; Leli Marlina; Tarsilem	Thailand; Panwas Sringam; Supalak Butgunha	Cambodia; Nam Yuok; Sorm Sun
Doubles	TT8	Indonesia; Hamida; Suwarti	not awarded	
Doubles	TT9	Indonesia; Hana Resti; Imas Yuniar	Vietnam; Lê Thị Hồng Hương; Nguyễn Thị Hoa Phượng	Philippines; Angela Labrador Querubin; Jhona Buban Pena
Doubles	TT9	Indonesia; Hana Resti; Imas Yuniar	Vietnam; Lê Thị Hồng Hương; Nguyễn Thị Hoa Phượng	Timor-Leste; Liliana da Costa Silva Mesquita; Pascoela dos Santos
Doubles	TT10	Indonesia; Cici Juliani; Sella Dwi Radayana	Thailand; Chayanan Settisrikoedkun; Intira Chapandung	Philippines; Mary Eloise Langoban Sable; Minnie de Ramos Cadag
Team	TT1-3	Thailand; Dararat Asayut; Patamawadee Intanon; Pattaravadee Wararitdamrongkul	Indonesia; Ida Yany; Listiana Herawati; Osrita Muslim	not awarded
Team	TT4	Thailand; Chilchitparyak Bootwansirina; Wassana Srigam; Wijittra Jaion	not awarded	
Team	TT5	Indonesia; Leli Marlina; Tarsilem	Thailand; Panwas Sringam; Supalak Butgunha; Suthida Saensathan	not awarded
Team	TT8	Indonesia; Hamida; Siti Fadhillah; Suwarti	Thailand; Kanlaya Chaiwut; Sumalee Suangtho; Supannee Kokaew	not awarded
Team	TT9	Indonesia; Hana Resti; Imas Yuniar	Vietnam; Hoàng Thị Thục Trâm; Lê Thị Hồng Hương	Timor-Leste; Liliana da Costa Silva Mesquita; Pascoela dos Santos
Team	TT10	Indonesia; Cici Juliani; Sella Dwi Radayana	Thailand; Chayanan Settisrikoedkun; Intira Chapandung; Janisa Khompast	Vietnam; Nguyễn Thị Hoa Phượng; Việt Thị Kim Vân

=== Mixed ===
Event	Class	Gold	Silver	Bronze
Doubles	TT1-3	Thailand (THA); Yuttajak Glinbancheun; Pattaravadee Wararitdamrongkul	Thailand (THA); Anurak Laowong; Dararat Asayut	Indonesia (INA); Sefrianto; Ida Yany
Doubles	TT1-3	Thailand (THA); Yuttajak Glinbancheun; Pattaravadee Wararitdamrongkul	Thailand (THA); Anurak Laowong; Dararat Asayut	Singapore (SGP); Muhammad Dinie Asyraf Huzaini; Claire Toh Shu Min
Doubles	TT4	Indonesia (INA); Adyos Astan; Tarsilem	Thailand (THA); Wanchai Chaiwut; Wijittra Jaion	Thailand (THA); Kittinan Harnpichai; Wassana Srigam
Doubles	TT4	Indonesia (INA); Adyos Astan; Tarsilem	Thailand (THA); Wanchai Chaiwut; Wijittra Jaion	Indonesia (INA); Yayang Gunaya; Osrita Muslim
Doubles	TT5	Thailand (THA); Norakan Chanphaka; Panwas Sringam	Indonesia (INA); Tatok Hardiyanto; Leli Marlina	Philippines (PHI); Darwin Labastida Salvacion; Lucena Baje Jaranilla
Doubles	TT5	Thailand (THA); Norakan Chanphaka; Panwas Sringam	Indonesia (INA); Tatok Hardiyanto; Leli Marlina	Thailand (THA); Teeradech Klangmanee; Supalak Butgunha
Doubles	TT6-7	Thailand (THA); Chalermpong Punpoo; Kanokporn Phathumchai	Thailand (THA); Rungroj Thainiyom; Supannee Kokaew	Indonesia (INA); Enceng Mustopa; Siti Fadhillah
Doubles	TT6-7	Thailand (THA); Chalermpong Punpoo; Kanokporn Phathumchai	Thailand (THA); Rungroj Thainiyom; Supannee Kokaew	Philippines (PHI); Leo Abulencia Macalanda; Jhona Buban Pena
Doubles	TT8	Indonesia (INA); Mohamad Rian Prahasta; Suwarti	Indonesia (INA); Banyu Tri Mulyo; Hamida	Thailand (THA); Kanlaya Chaiwut; Komkrit Charitsat
Doubles	TT8	Indonesia (INA); Mohamad Rian Prahasta; Suwarti	Indonesia (INA); Banyu Tri Mulyo; Hamida	Thailand (THA); Phisit Wangphonphathanasiri; Sumalee Suangtho
Doubles	TT9	Indonesia (INA); Aman Suratman; Imas Yuniar	Indonesia (INA); Kusnanto; Hana Resti	Thailand (THA); Chayanan Settisrikoedkun; Sukij Samee
Doubles	TT9	Indonesia (INA); Aman Suratman; Imas Yuniar	Indonesia (INA); Kusnanto; Hana Resti	Vietnam (VIE); Phạm Văn Hoàng; Nguyễn Thị Hoa Phượng
Doubles	TT10	Indonesia (INA); Komet Akbar; Sella Dwi Radayana	Malaysia (MAS); Chee Chaoming; Gloria Gracia Wong Sze	Thailand (THA); Bunpot Sillapakong; Intira Chapandung
Doubles	TT10	Indonesia (INA); Komet Akbar; Sella Dwi Radayana	Malaysia (MAS); Chee Chaoming; Gloria Gracia Wong Sze	Philippines (PHI); Andrew Kevin Bauyon Arandia; Mary Eloise Langoban Sable
