= David Wetherill =

British table tennis player

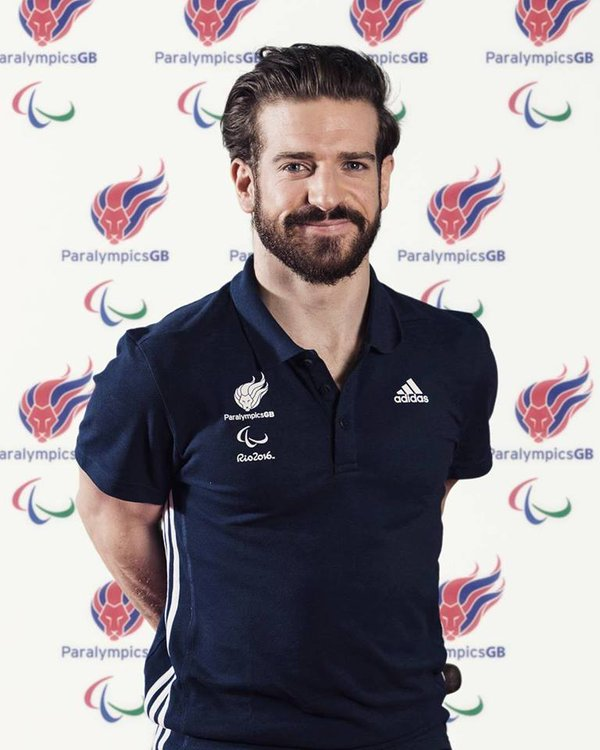

Personal information
- Nationality: British
- Born: 22 December 1989 (age 35)

Sport
- Sport: Table tennis

David Paul Wetherill (born 22 December 1989) is a British international table tennis player who has the rare bone development disorder multiple epiphyseal dysplasia.

Wetherill's hometown is Torpoint, Cornwall. Wetherill completed his bachelor's degree in Biological Chemistry at the University of Sheffield in 2011.

He has represented Great Britain at three international Paralympic Games, the first being Beijing in 2008 followed by London in 2012 and Rio in 2016. He finished in the top 8 in the 2008 games and was knocked out after his second game in 2012. Wetherill won a bronze medal in the singles and a silver medal in the team event at the 2015 European Championships.

Wetherill has also shown support for charities such as 'Do It For You' Day for cancer patients at the Sheffield Children's Hospital and a fundraiser for Young Kisharon.
