= Rungroj Thainiyom =

Thai para table tennis player

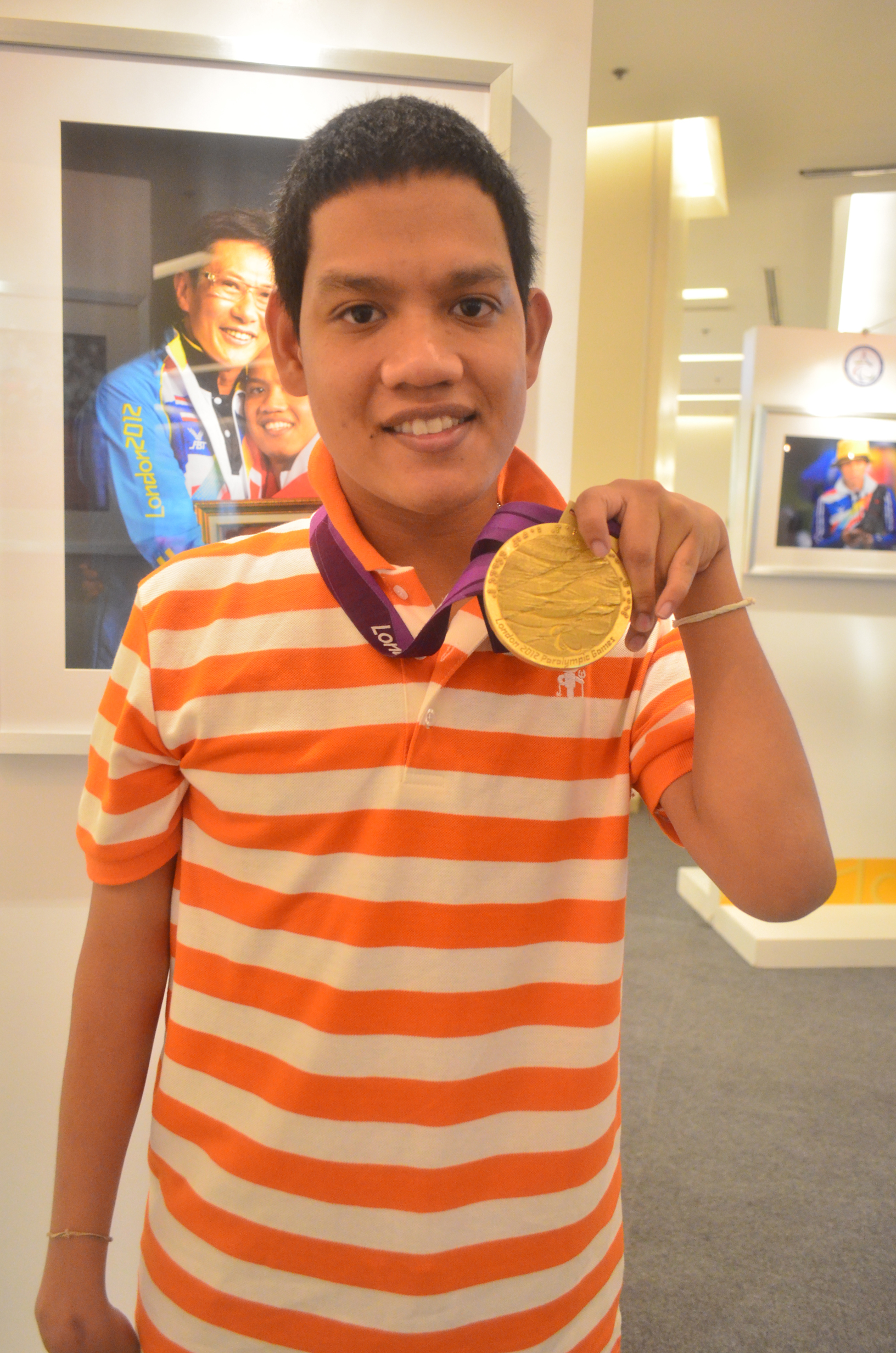

Personal information
- Nickname: Rung
- Born: 16 December 1986 (age 39) Bangkok, Thailand
- Height: 170 cm (5 ft 7 in)
- Weight: 60 kg (132 lb)

Sport
- Sport: Table tennis
- Playing style: Left-handed shakehand grip
- Disability class: 6
- Highest ranking: 2 (January 2012)
- Current ranking: 3 (February 2020)
Medal record
Men's para table tennis
Representing Thailand
Paralympic Games
Gold medal – first place	2012 London	Singles C6
Silver medal – second place	2024 Paris	Singles C6
Silver medal – second place	2024 Paris	Doubles MD14
Bronze medal – third place	2016 Rio de Janeiro	Singles C6
Bronze medal – third place	2020 Tokyo	Singles C6
World Championships
Silver medal – second place	2017 Bratislava	Teams C7
Bronze medal – third place	2014 Beijing	Singles C6
Bronze medal – third place	2018 Laško	Singles C6
Asian Para Games
Gold medal – first place	2018 Jakarta	Singles C6
Gold medal – first place	2018 Jakarta	Doubles C6–7
Gold medal – first place	2026 Aichi–Nagoya	Singles C6
Silver medal – second place	2022 Hangzhou	Singles C6
Silver medal – second place	2010 Guangzhou	Singles C6–7
Silver medal – second place	2014 Incheon	Singles C6
Bronze medal – third place	2014 Incheon	Teams C6–7
FESPIC Games
Gold medal – first place	2006 Kuala Lumpur	Singles C6
Asian Championships
Gold medal – first place	2005 Kuala Lumpur	Singles C6
Gold medal – first place	2007 Seoul	Singles C6
Gold medal – first place	2009 Amman	Singles C6
Gold medal – first place	2015 Amman	Singles C6
Gold medal – first place	2019 Taichung	Singles C6
Silver medal – second place	2009 Amman	Teams C6–7
Silver medal – second place	2013 Beijing	Singles C6
Silver medal – second place	2015 Amman	Teams C6–7
Bronze medal – third place	2013 Beijing	Teams C6–7
Bronze medal – third place	2019 Taichung	Teams C6–7
ASEAN Para Games
Gold medal – first place	2017 Kuala Lumpur	Singles C6-7
Gold medal – first place	2017 Kuala Lumpur	Teams C6-7
Gold medal – first place	2023 Phnom Penh	Singles C6
Gold medal – first place	2023 Phnom Penh	Doubles C6-7
Gold medal – first place	2023 Phnom Penh	Teams C6-7

Rungroj Thainiyom (Thai: รุ่งโรจน์ ไทยนิยม, RTGS: Rungrot Thainiyom, born 16 December 1986) is a para table tennis player from Thailand.

== Career ==
He has won a gold medal at the 2012 Summer Paralympics and a bronze medal at the 2016 Summer Paralympics. He was the first Thai to win a Paralympic gold medal in table tennis.

== Personal life ==
He has muscular dystrophy.
