= Stinna Kaastrup =

Danish para-equestrian (born 1994)

Personal information
- Full name: Stinna Tange Kaastrup
- Discipline: Para-dressage
- Born: 13 July 1994 (age 31); Denmark
- Horse(s): Horsebo Smarties
Medal record
Para-equestrian
Representing Denmark
Event / 1st / 2nd / 3rd; Paralympic Games / 0 / 0 / 2
Paralympic Games
Bronze medal – third place	2016 Rio	Individual championship test grade Ib
Bronze medal – third place	2016 Rio	Individual freestyle test grade Ib

Stinna Tange Kaastrup (born 13 July 1994) is a Danish female para-equestrian competing at Individual Championship test, Individual Freestyle test and Team test — grade Ib.

At the 2016 Summer Paralympics in Rio de Janeiro, Kaastrup and her horse, the 15 year-old Danish Warmblood gelding Horsebo Smarties, won a bronze medal with the score 73.966 percent at the individual championship test grade Ib event.
