= Indonesia men's national goalball team =

Indonesia national team, for the Paralympic sport of goalball

- Sport: Goalball
- League: IBSA
- Division: Men
- Region: IBSA Asia
- Location: Jakarta
- Colours: Red, White
- Championships: ASEAN Para Games medals:: 0: 2: 2

The Indonesia men's national goalball team is the men's national team of Indonesia. Goalball is a team sport designed specifically for athletes with a vision impairment. The team takes part in international competitions.

== Competitive records ==
=== Asian Para Games ===
Asian Para Games record
| Host / Year | Position | Pld | W | L | Notes |
|---|---|---|---|---|---|
| (China) 2010 | Did not participate | | | | |
| (South Korea) 2014 | Did not participate | | | | |
| (Indonesia) 2018 | 8th place | 3 | 0 | 3 | Group A 4th; did not advance. |
| Total | 1/3 | 3 | 0 | 3 | |

=== ASEAN Para Games ===
ASEAN Para Games record
| Host / Year | Position | Pld | W | L | Notes |
|---|---|---|---|---|---|
| (Philippines) 2005 | Did not participate | | | | |
| (Thailand) 2008 | Did not participate | | | | |
| (Indonesia) 2011 | 3rd place | — | — | — | Bronze reported by team staff in 2017 preview. |
| (Myanmar) 2014 | 3rd place | 5 | 3 | 2 | Bronze (men). |
| (Singapore) 2015 | 3rd place | 7 | 5 | 2 | Bronze (men). |
| (Malaysia) 2017 | Participated; final placing not documented in official open sources | | | | |
| (Indonesia) 2022 | 2nd place | 7 | 5 | 2 | Silver; lost the final to Thailand 11–13. |
| (Cambodia) 2023 | 2nd place | — | — | — | Thailand beat Indonesia 8–3 in the men's final. |
| Total | 6/8 | 23+ | 13+ | 10+ | |
