= Sophie Walløe =

Danish para table tennis player

Personal information
- Full name: Sophie Amanda Walløe
- Born: 14 April 2000 (age 26) Gladsaxe, Denmark
- Height: 1.70 m (5 ft 7 in)

Sport
- Country: Denmark
- Sport: Para table tennis
- Disability: Hip dysplasia
- Disability class: C10
Medal record
Para table tennis
Representing Denmark
World Championships
Silver medal – second place	2018 Laško	Women's singles C10
European Championships
Silver medal – second place	2015 Vejle	Women's singles C10
Silver medal – second place	2017 Laško	Women's singles C10
Bronze medal – third place	2013 Lignano	Women's singles C10
Bronze medal – third place	2017 Laško	Women's teams C9-10

Sophie Amanda Walløe (born 14 April 2000) is a Danish former para table tennis player who competed in international elite competitions. She is a World silver medalist and a four-time European medalist, she reached the bronze medal match at the 2016 Summer Paralympics but was defeated by home favourite Bruna Costa Alexandre in straight sets.
