= Badminton at the 2022 Asian Para Games – Men's singles SL4 =

Badminton's men's singles SL4 at the 2022 Asian Para Games
- Venue: Binjiang Gymnasium, Hangzhou
- Dates: 20 – 27 August 2023
- Competitors: 21 from 15 nations

Medalists
gold medal	Suhas Lalinakere Yathiraj	India
silver medal	Mohd Amin Burhanuddin	Malaysia
bronze medal	Fredy Setiawan	Indonesia
bronze medal	Sukant Kadam	India

The men's singles SL4 badminton tournament at the 2022 Asian Para Games is playing from 20 to 27 October 2023 in Binjiang Gymnasium, Hangzhou. A total of 21 players competed at the tournament, six of whom was seeded.

== Competition schedule ==
Plays are taking place between 20 and 27 October 2023.

GS	Group stage	R16	Round of 16	¼	Quarterfinals	½	Semifinals	F	Final

Events	Fri 20	Sat 21	Sun 22	Mon 23	Tue 24	Wed 25	Thu 26	Fri 27
Men's singles SL4	GS	GS		GS	R16	¼	½	F

== Seeds ==
The following players were seeded:

1. Fredy Setiawan (INA) (semi-finals; bronze medalist)
2. Tarun Dhillon (IND) (round of 16)
3. Sukant Kadam (IND) (semi-finals; bronze medalist)
4. Hikmat Ramdani (INA) (quarter-finals)
5. Suhas Lalinakere Yathiraj (IND) (final; gold medalist)
6. Chawarat Kitichokwattana (THA) (round of 16)

== Group stage ==
=== Group A ===
Pos	Team	Pld	W	L	GF	GA	GD	PF	PA	PD	Qualification
1	Fredy Setiawan (INA) [1]	2	2	0	4	1	+3	107	88	+19	Qualification to elimination stage
2	Siripong Teamarrom (THA)	2	1	1	3	2	+1	95	91	+4	Qualification to elimination stage
3	Ang Chee Hiong (SGP)	2	0	2	0	4	−4	62	85	−23	

Source: Group A – standings

Date		Score		Game 1	Game 2	Game 3
20 Oct	Siripong Teamarrom (Thailand)	2–0	(Singapore) Ang Chee Hiong	21–9	21–18	
21 Oct	Fredy Setiawan (Indonesia)	2–1	(Thailand) Siripong Teamarrom	22–24	21–15	21–14
23 Oct	Fredy Setiawan (Indonesia)	2–0	(Singapore) Ang Chee Hiong	21–15	22–20	

=== Group B ===
Pos	Team	Pld	W	L	GF	GA	GD	PF	PA	PD	Qualification
1	Mohd Amin Burhanuddin (MAS)	2	2	0	4	0	+4	84	52	+32	Qualification to elimination stage
2	Tarun Dhillon (IND) [2]	2	1	1	2	2	0	71	63	+8	Qualification to elimination stage
3	Gao Yuyang (CHN) (H)	2	0	2	0	4	−4	44	84	−40	

Source: Group B – standings
(H) Host

Date		Score		Game 1	Game 2	Game 3
20 Oct	Mohd Amin Burhanuddin (Malaysia)	2–0	(China) Gao Yuyang	21–13	21–10	
21 Oct	Tarun Dhillon (India)	0–2	(Malaysia) Mohd Amin Burhanuddin	13–21	16–21	
23 Oct	Tarun Dhillon (India)	2–0	(China) Gao Yuyang	21–10	21–11	

=== Group C ===
Pos	Team	Pld	W	L	GF	GA	GD	PF	PA	PD	Qualification
1	Sukant Kadam (IND) [3/4]	2	2	0	4	0	+4	88	40	+48	Qualification to elimination stage
2	Yeh En-chuan (TPE)	2	1	1	2	2	0	70	56	+14	Qualification to elimination stage
3	Ahmed Fayaz (MDV)	2	0	2	0	4	−4	22	84	−62	

Source: Group C – standings

Date		Score		Game 1	Game 2	Game 3
20 Oct	Yeh En-chuan (Chinese Taipei)	2–0	(Maldives) Ahmed Fayaz	21–9	21–1	
21 Oct	Sukant Kadam (India)	2–0	(Chinese Taipei) Yeh En-chuan	25–23	21–5	
23 Oct	Sukant Kadam (India)	2–0	(Maldives) Ahmed Fayaz	21–5	21–7	

=== Group D ===
Pos	Team	Pld	W	L	GF	GA	GD	PF	PA	PD	Qualification
1	Hikmat Ramdani (INA) [3/4]	3	3	0	6	0	+6	126	46	+80	Qualification to elimination stage
2	Muhammad Waqas Akthar (PAK)	3	2	1	4	2	+2	102	73	+29	Qualification to elimination stage
3	Adhikari Prakash (NEP)	3	1	2	2	5	−3	99	143	−44	
4	Ali Alasadi (IRQ)	3	0	3	1	6	−5	80	145	−65	

Source: Group D – standings

Date		Score		Game 1	Game 2	Game 3
20 Oct	Hikmat Ramdani (Indonesia)	2–0	(Pakistan) Muhammad Waqas Akthar	21–9	21–9	
20 Oct	Ali Alasadi (Iraq)	1–2	(Nepal) Adhikari Prakash	19–21	21–19	19–21
21 Oct	Hikmat Ramdani (Indonesia)	2–0	(Iraq) Ali Alasadi	21–7	21–7	
21 Oct	Adhikari Prakash (Nepal)	0–2	(Pakistan) Muhammad Waqas Akthar	12–21	12–21	
23 Oct	Hikmat Ramdani (Indonesia)	2–0	(Nepal) Adhikari Prakash	21–5	21–9	
23 Oct	Ali Alasadi (Iraq)	0–2	(Pakistan) Muhammad Waqas Akthar	4–21	3–21	

=== Group E ===
Pos	Team	Pld	W	L	GF	GA	GD	PF	PA	PD	Qualification
1	Suhas Lalinakere Yathiraj (IND) [5/6]	3	3	0	6	1	+5	139	61	+78	Qualification to elimination stage
2	Shin Kyung-hwan (KOR)	3	2	1	5	2	+3	114	86	+28	Qualification to elimination stage
3	Fu Fazheng (CHN) (H)	3	1	2	2	5	−3	105	128	−23	
4	Shamin Shaharia (BAN)	3	0	3	1	6	−5	66	149	−83	

Source: Group E – standings
(H) Host

Date		Score		Game 1	Game 2	Game 3
20 Oct	Suhas Lalinakere Yathiraj (India)	2–0	(China) Fu Fazheng	21–10	21–8	
20 Oct	Shin Kyung-hwan (South Korea)	2–0	(Bangladesh) Shamin Shaharia	21–6	21–3	
21 Oct	Suhas Lalinakere Yathiraj (India)	2–1	(South Korea) Shin Kyung-hwan	13–21	21–5	21–4
21 Oct	Shamin Shaharia (Bangladesh)	1–2	(China) Fu Fazheng	25–23	11–21	8–21
23 Oct	Suhas Lalinakere Yathiraj (India)	2–0	(Bangladesh) Shamin Shaharia	21–9	21–4	
23 Oct	Shin Kyung-hwan (South Korea)	2–0	(China) Fu Fazheng	21–15	21–7	

=== Group F ===
Pos	Team	Pld	W	L	GF	GA	GD	PF	PA	PD	Qualification
1	Chawarat Kitichokwattana (THA) [5/6]	3	3	0	6	1	+5	144	97	+47	Qualification to elimination stage
2	Kaluge Madduma (SRI)	3	2	1	4	2	+2	109	82	+27	Qualification to elimination stage
3	Jeon Sun-woo (KOR)	3	1	2	3	4	−1	116	110	+6	
4	Lee Yan Ping (HKG)	3	0	3	0	6	−6	46	126	−80	

Source: Group F – standings

Date		Score		Game 1	Game 2	Game 3
20 Oct	Chawarat Kitichokwattana (Thailand)	2–0	(Hong Kong) Lee Yan Ping	21–11	21–12	
20 Oct	Kaluge Madduma (Sri Lanka)	2–0	(South Korea) Jeon Sun-woo	21–14	21–11	
21 Oct	Chawarat Kitichokwattana (Thailand)	2–0	(Sri Lanka) Kaluge Madduma	21–14	21–11	
21 Oct	Jeon Sun-woo (South Korea)	2–0	(Hong Kong) Lee Yan Ping	21–3	21–5	
23 Oct	Chawarat Kitichokwattana (Thailand)	2–1	(South Korea) Jeon Sun-woo	21–14	18–21	21–14
23 Oct	Kaluge Madduma (Sri Lanka)	2–0	(Hong Kong) Lee Yan Ping	21–12	21–3	

== Elimination round ==
Top two ranked in each group qualified to the elimination round, the draw was decided after the previous round finished.

Round of 16
Kaluge Madduma (SRI)	20	12
Siripong Teamarrom (THA)	22	21
5/6	Suhas Lalinakere Yathiraj (IND)	21	21
2	Tarun Dhillon (IND)	19	15
Shin Kyung-hwan (KOR)	21	17	21
5/6	Chawarat Kitichokwattana (THA)	14	21	15
Yeh En-chuan (TPE)	21	21
Muhammad Waqas Akthar (PAK)	14	12

Quarter-finals
1	Fredy Setiawan (INA)	19	21	21
Siripong Teamarrom (THA)	21	15	5
3/4	Hikmat Ramdani (INA)	19	17
5/6	Suhas Lalinakere Yathiraj (IND)	21	21
Shin Kyung-hwan (KOR)	21	17	20
3/4	Sukant Kadam (IND)	12	21	22
Yeh En-chuan (TPE)	6	11
Mohd Amin Burhanuddin (MAS)	21	21

Semi-finals
1	Fredy Setiawan (INA)	12	19
5/6	Suhas Lalinakere Yathiraj (IND)	21	21
3/4	Sukant Kadam (IND)	21	9
Mohd Amin Burhanuddin (MAS)	23	21

Final
5/6	Suhas Lalinakere Yathiraj (IND)	13	21	21
Mohd Amin Burhanuddin (MAS)	21	18	9
