= Badminton at the 2024 Summer Paralympics – Men's singles SL4 =

Badminton competition

Men's singles SL4 at the XVII Paralympic Games
- Venue: Arena Porte de La Chapelle, Paris
- Dates: 29 August 2024 – 2 September 2024
- Competitors: 12 from 9 nations

Medalists
1st place, gold medalist(s)		Lucas Mazur	France
2nd place, silver medalist(s)		Suhas Lalinakere Yathiraj	India
3rd place, bronze medalist(s)		Fredy Setiawan	Indonesia

The men's singles SL4 tournament at the 2024 Summer Paralympics in France will take place between 29 August and 2 September 2024 at Arena Porte de La Chapelle.

== Classification ==
- SL4
  Players have impairment in one or both lower limbs and minimal impairment in walking/running balance (better walking/running compared to SL3)

== Seeds ==
These were the seeds for this event:

1. Suhas Lalinakere Yathiraj (IND) (final, silver medalist)
2. Lucas Mazur (FRA) (champion, gold medalist)
3. Fredy Setiawan (INA) (semifinals, bronze medalist)
4. Mohd Amin Burhanuddin (MAS) (group stage)

== Group stage ==
The draw of the group stage revealed on 24 August 2024. The group stage will be played from 29 to 31 August. The top winner of each group advanced to the knockout rounds.

=== Group A ===
Pos	Team	Pld	W	L	GF	GA	GD	PF	PA	PD	Pts	Qualification
1	Suhas Lalinakere Yathiraj (IND)	2	2	0	4	0	+4	89	50	+39	2	Semi-finals
2	Hikmat Ramdani (INA)	2	1	1	2	3	−1	70	93	−23	1	
3	Shin Kyung-hwan (KOR)	2	0	2	1	4	−3	89	105	−16	0	

First match(es) will be played: 29 August 2024. Source: COJOP2024

Date	Time	Player 1	Score	Player 2	Set 1	Set 2	Set 3	Report
Aug 29	12:00	Suhas Lalinakere Yathiraj (India)	2–0	(Indonesia) Hikmat Ramdani	21–7	21–5		Report
Aug 30	11:33	Suhas Lalinakere Yathiraj (India)	2–0	(South Korea) Shin Kyung-hwan	26–24	21–14		Report
Aug 31	12:04	Hikmat Ramdani (Indonesia)	2–1	(South Korea) Shin Kyung-hwan	21–15	16–21	21–15	Report

=== Group B ===
Pos	Team	Pld	W	L	GF	GA	GD	PF	PA	PD	Pts	Qualification
1	Sukant Kadam (IND)	2	2	0	4	1	+3	102	80	+22	2	Semi-finals
2	Mohd Amin Burhanuddin (MAS)	2	1	1	3	2	+1	99	94	+5	1	
3	Siripong Teamarrom (THA)	2	0	2	0	4	−4	58	85	−27	0	

First match(es) will be played: 29 August 2024. Source: COJOP2024

Date	Time	Player 1	Score	Player 2	Set 1	Set 2	Set 3	Report
Aug 29	11:19	Mohd Amin Burhanuddin (Malaysia)	1–2	(India) Sukant Kadam	21–17	15–21	20–22	Report
Aug 30	11:03	Mohd Amin Burhanuddin (Malaysia)	2–0	(Thailand) Siripong Teamarrom	21–14	22–20		Report
Aug 31	11:29	Sukant Kadam (India)	2–0	(Thailand) Siripong Teamarrom	21–12	21–12		Report

=== Group C ===
Pos	Team	Pld	W	L	GF	GA	GD	PF	PA	PD	Pts	Qualification
1	Fredy Setiawan (INA)	2	2	0	4	0	+4	87	53	+34	2	Semi-finals
2	Jeremiah Nnanna (NGR)	2	1	1	2	2	0	76	72	+4	1	
3	Marcel Adam (GER)	2	0	2	0	4	−4	46	84	−38	0	

First match(es) will be played: 29 August 2024. Source: COJOP2024

Date	Time	Player 1	Score	Player 2	Set 1	Set 2	Set 3	Report
Aug 29	11:36	Marcel Adam (Germany)	0–2	(Nigeria) Jeremiah Nnanna	12–21	15–21		Report
Aug 30	11:42	Fredy Setiawan (Indonesia)	2–0	(Nigeria) Jeremiah Nnanna	21–12	24–22		Report
Aug 31	11:08	Fredy Setiawan (Indonesia)	2–0	(Germany) Marcel Adam	21–4	21–15		Report

=== Group D ===
Pos	Team	Pld	W	L	GF	GA	GD	PF	PA	PD	Pts	Qualification
1	Lucas Mazur (FRA) (H)	2	2	0	4	0	+4	84	39	+45	2	Semi-finals
2	Tarun Dhillon (IND)	2	1	1	2	2	0	65	78	−13	1	
3	Rogério Oliveira (BRA)	2	0	2	0	4	−4	52	84	−32	0	

First match(es) will be played: 29 August 2024. Source: COJOP2024
(H) Host

Date	Time	Player 1	Score	Player 2	Set 1	Set 2	Set 3	Report
Aug 29	12:10	Rogério Oliveira (Brazil)	0–2	(India) Tarun Dhillon	17–21	19–21		Report
Aug 30	12:23	Lucas Mazur (France)	2–0	(Brazil) Rogério Oliveira	21–9	21–7		Report
Aug 31	11:40	Lucas Mazur (France)	2–0	(India) Tarun Dhillon	21–7	21–16		Report

== Finals ==
The knockout stage will be played from 1 to 2 September.

Semi-finals
1	Suhas Lalinakere Yathiraj (IND)	21	21	-
Sukant Kadam (IND)	17	12	-
3	Fredy Setiawan (INA)	13	8	-
2	Lucas Mazur (FRA)	21	21	-

Gold medal match
1	Suhas Lalinakere Yathiraj (IND) (silver)	9	13	-
2	Lucas Mazur (FRA) (gold)	21	21	-
Bronze medal match
Sukant Kadam (IND)	17	18	-
3	Fredy Setiawan (INA) (bronze)	21	21	-
