= Dhall =

Dhall may refer to:

- Rajiv Dhall (born 1992), Indian American singer-songwriter
- Kalyan Dhall (born 1960), Indian former cricketer

== See also ==
- Dhall Kakka, a village in Pakistan
- Dhal or dal, in Indian cuisine
- Dal (disambiguation)
- Dahl (disambiguation)
- Daal (disambiguation)
