= Badminton at the 2020 Summer Paralympics – Men's singles SL4 =

Men's singles SL4 at the XVI Paralympic Games
- Venue: Yoyogi National Gymnasium
- Dates: 2–5 September 2021
- Competitors: 8 from 6 nations

Medalists
1st place, gold medalist(s)		Lucas Mazur	France
2nd place, silver medalist(s)		Suhas Lalinakere Yathiraj	India
3rd place, bronze medalist(s)		Fredy Setiawan	Indonesia

The men's singles SL4 tournament at the 2020 Summer Paralympics in Tokyo took place between 2 and 5 September 2021 at Yoyogi National Gymnasium.

== Seeds ==
These were the seeds for this event:

1. Lucas Mazur (FRA) (gold medalist)
2. Tarun Dhillon (IND) (fourth place)

== Group stage ==
The draw of the group stage revealed on 26 August 2021. The group stage was played from 2 to 3 September. The top two winners of each group advanced to the knockout rounds.

=== Group A ===
Pos	Team	Pld	W	L	GF	GA	GD	PF	PA	PD	Pts	Qualification
1	Lucas Mazur (FRA)	3	3	0	6	0	+6	126	52	+74	3	Advance to semi-finals
2	Suhas Lalinakere Yathiraj (IND)	3	2	1	4	2	+2	116	72	+44	2	Advance to semi-finals
3	Jan-Niklas Pott (GER)	3	1	2	2	4	−2	66	120	−54	1	
4	Hary Susanto (INA)	3	0	3	0	6	−6	64	128	−64	0	

Source: TOCOG

Date	Time	Player 1	Score	Player 2	Set 1	Set 2	Set 3
2 Sep	09:40	Suhas Lalinakere Yathiraj (India)	2–0	(Germany) Jan-Niklas Pott	21–9	21–3	
2 Sep	09:40	Lucas Mazur (France)	2–0	(Indonesia) Hary Susanto	21–3	21–7	
3 Sep	09:40	Lucas Mazur (France)	2–0	(Germany) Jan-Niklas Pott	21–3	21–7	
3 Sep	10:20	Suhas Lalinakere Yathiraj (India)	2–0	(Indonesia) Hary Susanto	21–6	21–12	
3 Sep	16:40	Lucas Mazur (France)	2–0	(India) Suhas Lalinakere Yathiraj	21–15	21–17	
3 Sep	16:40	Jan-Niklas Pott (Germany)	2–0	(Indonesia) Hary Susanto	21–15	23–21	

=== Group B ===
Pos	Team	Pld	W	L	GF	GA	GD	PF	PA	PD	Pts	Qualification
1	Fredy Setiawan (INA)	3	3	0	6	0	+6	126	73	+53	3	Advance to semi-finals
2	Tarun Dhillon (IND)	3	2	1	4	3	+1	127	118	+9	2	Advance to semi-finals
3	Shin Kyung-hwan (KOR)	3	1	2	3	4	−1	115	124	−9	1	
4	Siripong Teamarrom (THA)	3	0	3	0	6	−6	73	126	−53	0	

Source: TOCOG

Date	Time	Player 1	Score	Player 2	Set 1	Set 2	Set 3
2 Sep	10:20	Tarun Dhillon (India)	2–0	(Thailand) Siripong Teamarrom	21–7	21–13	
2 Sep	10:20	Fredy Setiawan (Indonesia)	2–0	(South Korea) Shin Kyung-hwan	21–8	21–9	
3 Sep	09:40	Fredy Setiawan (Indonesia)	2–0	(Thailand) Siripong Teamarrom	21–17	21–11	
3 Sep	10:20	Tarun Dhillon (India)	2–1	(South Korea) Shin Kyung-hwan	21–18	15–21	21–17
3 Sep	17:20	Tarun Dhillon (India)	0–2	(Indonesia) Fredy Setiawan	19–21	9–21	
3 Sep	17:20	Siripong Teamarrom (Thailand)	0–2	(South Korea) Shin Kyung-hwan	17–21	8–21	

== Finals ==
The knockout stage was played from 4 to 5 September.

Semi-finals
A1	Lucas Mazur (FRA)	21	16	21
B2	Tarun Dhillon (IND)	16	21	18
A2	Suhas Lalinakere Yathiraj (IND)	21	21
B1	Fredy Setiawan (INA)	9	15

Gold medal match
A1	Lucas Mazur (FRA) (gold)	15	21	21
A2	Suhas Lalinakere Yathiraj (IND) (silver)	21	17	15
Bronze medal match
B2	Tarun Dhillon (IND)	17	11
B1	Fredy Setiawan (INA) (bronze)	21	21
