= Badminton at the 2022 Asian Para Games – Men's doubles SL3–SL4 =

Badminton's men's doubles SL3–SL4 at the 2022 Asian Para Games
- Venue: Binjiang Gymnasium, Hangzhou
- Dates: 21 – 27 August 2023
- Competitors: 24 from 9 nations

Medalists
gold medal	Kumar Nitesh; Tarun Dhillon	India
silver medal	Dwiyoko; Fredy Setiawan	Indonesia
bronze medal	Pramod Bhagat; Sukant Kadam	India
bronze medal	Joo Dong-jae; Shin Kyung-hwan	South Korea

The men's doubles SL3–SL4 badminton tournament at the 2022 Asian Para Games is playing from 21 to 27 October 2023 in Binjiang Gymnasium, Hangzhou. A total of 12 pairs competed at the tournament, four of whom was seeded.

== Competition schedule ==
Plays are taking place between 21 and 27 October 2023.

GS	Group stage	¼	Quarterfinals	½	Semifinals	F	Final

Events	Fri 20	Sat 21	Sun 22	Mon 23	Tue 24	Wed 25	Thu 26	Fri 27
Men's doubles SL3–SL4		GS		GS	GS	¼	½	F

== Seeds ==
The following players were seeded:

1. Pramod Bhagat / Sukant Kadam (IND) (semi-finals; bronze medalists)
2. Kumar Nitesh / Tarun Dhillon (IND) (champion; gold medalists)
3. Dwiyoko / Fredy Setiawan (INA) (final; silver medalists)
4. Joo Dong-jae / Shin Kyung-hwan (KOR) (semi-finals; bronze medalists)

== Group stage ==
=== Group A ===
Pos	Team	Pld	W	L	GF	GA	GD	PF	PA	PD	Qualification
1	Pramod Bhagat (IND) Sukant Kadam (IND) [1]	2	2	0	4	0	+4	84	49	+35	Qualification to elimination stage
2	Ukun Rukaendi (INA) Hary Susanto (INA)	2	1	1	2	2	0	65	63	+2	Qualification to elimination stage
3	Huang Hsing-chih (TPE) Yeh En-chuan (TPE)	2	0	2	0	4	−4	47	84	−37	

Source: Group A – standings

Date		Score		Game 1	Game 2	Game 3
21 Oct	Ukun Rukaendi (Indonesia); Hary Susanto (Indonesia)	2–0	(Chinese Taipei) Huang Hsing-chih (Chinese Taipei) Yeh En-chuan	21–15	21–6	
23 Oct	Pramod Bhagat (India); Sukant Kadam (India)	2–0	(Indonesia) Ukun Rukaendi (Indonesia) Hary Susanto	21–8	21–15	
24 Oct	Pramod Bhagat (India); Sukant Kadam (India)	2–0	(Chinese Taipei) Huang Hsing-chih (Chinese Taipei) Yeh En-chuan	21–11	21–15	

=== Group B ===
Pos	Team	Pld	W	L	GF	GA	GD	PF	PA	PD	Qualification
1	Kumar Nitesh (IND) Tarun Dhillon (IND) [2]	2	2	0	4	0	+4	86	48	+38	Qualification to elimination stage
2	Sangnil Singha (THA) Siripong Teamarrom (THA)	2	1	1	2	2	0	73	60	+13	Qualification to elimination stage
3	Ali Alasadi (IRQ) Ashraf Al-Khaddam (IRQ)	2	0	2	0	4	−4	33	84	−51	

Source: Group B – standings

Date		Score		Game 1	Game 2	Game 3
21 Oct	Ali Alasadi (Iraq); Ashraf Al-Khaddam (Iraq)	0–2	(Thailand) Sangnil Singha (Thailand) Siripong Teamarrom	7–21	9–21	
23 Oct	Kumar Nitesh (India); Tarun Dhillon (India)	2–0	(Iraq) Ali Alasadi (Iraq) Ashraf Al-Khaddam	21–5	21–12	
24 Oct	Kumar Nitesh (India); Tarun Dhillon (India)	2–0	(Thailand) Sangnil Singha (Thailand) Siripong Teamarrom	23–21	21–10	

=== Group C ===
Pos	Team	Pld	W	L	GF	GA	GD	PF	PA	PD	Qualification
1	Dwiyoko (INA) Fredy Setiawan (INA) [3/4]	2	2	0	4	0	+4	84	37	+47	Qualification to elimination stage
2	Muhammad Waqas Akthar (PAK) Zeeshan Gohar (PAK)	2	1	1	2	2	0	63	39	+24	Qualification to elimination stage
3	Ahmed Fayaz (MDV) Mohamed Abdul Latheef (MDV)	2	0	2	0	4	−4	43	84	−41	

Source: Group C – standings

Date		Score		Game 1	Game 2	Game 3
21 Oct	Muhammad Waqas Akthar (Pakistan); Zeeshan Gohar (Pakistan)	2–0	(Maldives) Ahmed Fayaz (Maldives) Mohamed Abdul Latheef	21–12	21–15	
23 Oct	Dwiyoko (Indonesia); Fredy Setiawan (Indonesia)	2–0	(Pakistan) Muhammad Waqas Akthar (Pakistan) Zeeshan Gohar	21–11	21–10	
24 Oct	Dwiyoko (Indonesia); Fredy Setiawan (Indonesia)	2–0	(Maldives) Ahmed Fayaz (Maldives) Mohamed Abdul Latheef	21–10	21–4	

=== Group D ===
Pos	Team	Pld	W	L	GF	GA	GD	PF	PA	PD	Qualification
1	Joo Dong-jae (KOR) Shin Kyung-hwan (KOR) [3/4]	2	2	0	4	1	+3	95	76	+19	Qualification to elimination stage
2	Gao Yuyang (CHN) Yang Jianyuan (CHN) (H)	2	1	1	3	3	0	108	109	−1	Qualification to elimination stage
3	Mongkhon Bunsun (THA) Chawarat Kitichokwattana (THA)	2	0	2	1	4	−3	82	100	−18	

Source: Group D – standings
(H) Host

Date		Score		Game 1	Game 2	Game 3
21 Oct	Gao Yuyang (China); Yang Jianyuan (China)	2–1	(Thailand) Mongkhon Bunsun (Thailand) Chawarat Kitichokwattana	16–21	21–18	21–17
23 Oct	Joo Dong-jae (South Korea); Shin Kyung-hwan (South Korea)	1–2	(China) Gao Yuyang (China) Yang Jianyuan	11–21	21–13	21–16
24 Oct	Joo Dong-jae (South Korea); Shin Kyung-hwan (South Korea)	2–0	(Thailand) Mongkhon Bunsun (Thailand) Chawarat Kitichokwattana	21–15	21–11	

== Elimination round ==
Top two ranked in each group qualified to the elimination round, the draw was decided after the previous round finished.

Quarter-finals
1	Pramod Bhagat (IND); Sukant Kadam (IND)	21	19	21
Sangnil Singha (THA); Siripong Teamarrom (THA)	10	21	12
3/4	Dwiyoko (INA); Fredy Setiawan (INA)	21	21
Gao Yuyang (CHN); Yang Jianyuan (CHN)	17	16
Muhammad Waqas Akthar (PAK); Zeeshan Gohar (PAK)	11	9
3/4	Joo Dong-jae (KOR); Shin Kyung-hwan (KOR)	21	21
Ukun Rukaendi (INA); Hary Susanto (INA)	14	21	16
2	Kumar Nitesh (IND); Tarun Dhillon (IND)	21	19	21

Semi-finals
1	Pramod Bhagat (IND); Sukant Kadam (IND)	22	21	12
3/4	Dwiyoko (INA); Fredy Setiawan (INA)	20	23	21
3/4	Joo Dong-jae (KOR); Shin Kyung-hwan (KOR)	16	12
2	Kumar Nitesh (IND); Tarun Dhillon (IND)	21	21

Final
3/4	Dwiyoko (INA); Fredy Setiawan (INA)	21	19	20
2	Kumar Nitesh (IND); Tarun Dhillon (IND)	9	21	22
