= Dal (disambiguation) =

Dal is a term in the Indian subcontinent for dried, split pulses.

Dal or DAL may also refer to:

== Organizations ==
- Allah'r Dal, Bangladeshi Islamist terrorist organization
- Bajrang Dal, Indian Hindutva militant organization
- Bangladesh Jatiotabadi Chatra Dal, student organization affiliated with the Bangladesh Nationalist Party
- Bhartiya Gau Raksha Dal, Indian militant Hindutva organization
- DAL Group, private Sudanese conglomerate
- Dal Khalsa (disambiguation), multiple organizations
- Dal Shabet, South Korean girl group
- Garam dal, a historical faction of the Indian National Congress
- Prantiya Rakshak Dal, security force in Uttar Pradesh, India
- Seva Dal, a subsidiary organization of the Indian National Congress

=== Political parties ===
- All India Progressive Janata Dal
- Apna Dal
- Bharatiya Kranti Dal
- Bharatiya Lok Dal
- Biju Janata Dal
- Indian National Lok Dal
- Janata Dal
  - Janata Dal (United)
  - Janata Dal (Secular)
- Janshakti Janata Dal
- Jatiya Samajtantrik Dal
- Lok Dal
- Loktantrik Janata Dal
- Mahan Dal
- Param Digvijay Dal
- Raijor Dal
- Rashtriya Janata Dal
- Rashtriya Lok Dal
- Shiromani Akali Dal
  - Shiromani Akali Dal (disambiguation)
- Uttarakhand Kranti Dal

== People ==
- Dal (name)

== Places ==
=== Modern ===
==== Finland ====
- Laakso (Dal), a neighbourhood of Helsinki

==== India ====
- Dal Lake, in Srinagar, Jammu and Kashmir, India
- Dal Lake (Himachal Pradesh), India
- Lama Dal, high altitude lake

==== Iran ====
- Dal, Khuzestan
- Dal, Kurdistan

=== Norway ===
- Dal, Norway
  - Dal Station

==== Romania ====
- Dál, the Hungarian name of Deal, Câlnic, Alba

==== Sweden ====
- Dal Hundred, Östergötland
- Dal River

=== Historical ===
- Dál Fiatach, medieval dynastic grouping and territory in Ireland
- Dál nAraidi, medieval Cruthin kingdom in Ireland
  - Dál nAraidi in Tuaiscirt, Dál nAraidi petty kingdom
  - Dál mBuinne, Dál nAraidi petty kingdom
- Dál Riata, medieval Gaelic kingdom in Scotland and Ireland

== Science and technology ==
- Data access layer, a software architecture layer
- Database abstraction layer, an application programming interface
- Data Access Language, a discontinued SQL-like language and application programming interface by Apple Computer
- Decalitre, a measure of volume
- Direct Algebraic Logic, Sharp's calculator input method
- Development Assurance Level in ARP4754

== Transport ==
- Dallas Love Field, an airport in Dallas, Texas
- Delta Air Lines, ICAO airline code DAL
- Deutsche Afrika-Linien, a German shipping company

== Other uses ==
- Abbreviations for the sports teams of Dallas, Texas:
  - Dallas Cowboys of the National Football League
  - Dallas Mavericks of the National Basketball Association
  - Dallas Stars of the National Hockey League
- A Dal, annual music competition in Hungary
- Brødrene Dal, Norwegian television series
- Dal (name), including a list of people with the surname, given name or nickname
- Dāl, Arabic letter د
- Ḏāl, Arabic letter ذ
- Dal (Doctor Who), former name of the Daleks in Doctor Who
- Dalhousie University, commonly known as Dal, in Halifax, Nova Scotia, Canada
- Date A Live, a Japanese light novel series
- Diplomatic Academy of London, an online institution
- Dal, a scheduled tribe in India
- Dal, a Pullip fashion doll
- Dal, a fictional character in The Tribe (1999 TV series)

== See also ==
- Dahl (disambiguation)
- Daal (disambiguation)
- DALnet, an Internet Relay Chat network
