= Dal (name) =

Male given name

- Gender: Male

Other gender
- Feminine: Dalia

Origin
- Meaning: Dahlia (a type of flower)

Dal is a male given name, surname, and nickname.

In the Balkans, Dal has recently become one of the most popular names for newborn males among Bosniaks in the former Yugoslav nations. The name is the male version of the popular female name Dalia. In Serbo-Croatian, Dal/Dalia translates to dahlia (a type of flower). The name gained popularity around the same time as the male-given name Mak, which translates to poppy (another type of flower).

Dal is also popular in Asian countries, specifically Nepal.

== Given name ==
- Dal Bahadur (fl. 2017), Indian politician
- Dal Bahadur Gurung (1922–1992), Nepalese person mistaken for an imaginary character
- Dal Bahadur Rana (fl. from 2008), Nepalese politician
- Dal Bahadur Sunar (born 1959), Nepalese politician
- Dal Collins (1907–2001), South African cricket umpire
- Dal Joon Lee (1939–2010), American table tennis player
- Dal Mardan Shah (r. 1764–1765), Nepalese king of the Malla state of Patan
- Dal Millington Lemmon (1887–1958), American judge
- Dal Shealy (born 1938), American football player
- Dal Singh (politician) (1915–1991), Indian politician
- Dal Singh Thapa, Nepalese Congress leader imprisoned for a 1961 assassination attempt
- Dal Stivens (1911–1997), Austrian writer
- Dal Varešanović (born 2001), Bosnian footballer

== Surname ==
- Nedim Dal (Edin Delić, born 1975), Bosnian-born Turkish basketball player
- Oleg Dal (1941–1981), Soviet actor
- Vladimir Dal (1801–1872), Russian lexicographer

== Nickname ==
- Dal Dozzi (1936–2012), Australian rules footballer Adelio Paul Dozzi
- Dal Maxvill (born 1939), American baseball player Charles Dallan Maxvill
- Dal Stivens (1911–1997), Australian writer Dallas George Stivens
