= Gaurav Khanna (badminton) =

Indian para-badminton team coach

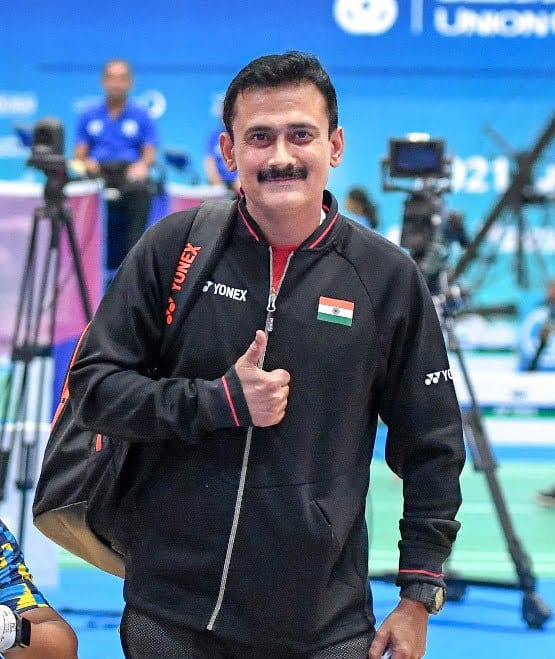
- Gaurav Khanna is the National head coach of Indian Para-Badminton team

Personal information
- Spouse: Mohita Khanna

Sport
- Country: India
- Sport: Para-badminton
- Team: Indian para-badminton team
- Now coaching: Suhas Lalinakere Yathiraj, Chirag Baretha, Sivarajan Solaimalai, Nithya Sre Sivan, Mandeep Kaur, Pramod Bhagat, Rohit Bhaker, Nilesh Gaikwad, Abu Hubaida, Prem Ale, Sukant Kadam, Palak Kohli, Raj Kumar, Parul Parmar, Manoj Sarkar

Shri Gaurav Khanna (born 11 December 1975) is an Indian para-badminton team's head coach. Khanna has been widely recognized as the man behind the rise of para-badminton in the country. Khanna encountered several trials and tribulations during his youth and early life, but his desire propelled him onward, and despite all obstacles, he emerged as a selfless individual driven to make a positive difference in the lives of others. His chronicle of battles that led to him becoming a role model for society is also included in the National Geographic documentary series #One For Change and Samarth Series by Hundai in association with NDTV.

== Awards and honours ==
=== National Awards ===
- 2024 - Padma Shri
- 2020 - Dronacharya Award

=== State Awards ===
- 2024 - LMA Transformation Leadership Award
- 2024 - PC Indian Achievers Award
- 2016 - Yashi Bharti Award
- 2017 - Guru Gobind Singh Award

=== Other Awards ===
- 2020 - TAL Hero Award
- 2022 - Stambh Award
- 2021 - Bravery Award
- 2019 - Best Individual Working For the Cause of PWD
- 2018 - Outstanding Services Award
- 2024 - Apporva Samman

He is first Para Sports Coach of the country to be conferred with Padma Shree Award 2024. In 2020, he became the first Para Sports Coach in the country to be honored with Dronacharya Award for his exceptional contribution to para badminton. He is the first Para Coach from UP to have received the highest civilian honor of the state - “Yash Bharti” from CM of UP Government in the field of badminton.

== Coaching career ==
He established the country's first Para Badminton academy namely, Gaurav Khanna Excellia Badminton Academy. The Indian Para Badminton team has won a total of 1021 medals (276 golds, 287 silvers, and 458 bronzes) in BWF-recognized international tournaments since 2015, following his nomination as Head National Coach. These competitions include the Asian Para Games, World Championships, and Tokyo Paralympics. Many of his trainee athletes are among the best in the world and have won the nation's greatest athletic honors.

He has coached Suhas Lalinakere Yathiraj Abu Hubaida, Palak Kohli, Chirag Baretha, and Prem Kumar Ale.

== Medal Tally of Indian Para Badminton Team ==
The Indian Para Badminton Team, under guidance and training of Para coach Shri Gaurav Khanna, has won the following medal.

=== Barhain Para Badminton International 2025 ===
Year	Gold	Silver	Bronze	Total
2025	6	6	11	23

=== Fazza Dubai Para Badminton International 2025 ===
Year	Gold	Silver	Bronze	Total
2025	1	4	14	19

=== Spain Para Badminton International 2025 (Toledo) ===
Year	Gold	Silver	Bronze	Total
2025	7	4	10	21

=== Spain Para Badminton International 2025 (vitoria gasteiz) ===
Year	Gold	Silver	Bronze	Total
2025	7	4	10	21

=== Egypt Para Badminton International 2025 ===
Year	Gold	Silver	Bronze	Total
2025	14	11	15	40

=== Barhain Para Badminton International 2024 ===
Year	Gold	Silver	Bronze	Total
2024	3	7	19	29

=== Japan Para Badminton International 2024 ===
Year	Gold	Silver	Bronze	Total
2024	6	9	9	24

=== Indonesia Para Badminton International 2024 ===
Year	Gold	Silver	Bronze	Total
2024	6	6	9	21

=== Paris Paralympic 2024 ===
Year	Gold	Silver	Bronze	Total
2024	1	2	2	5

=== Uganda Para Badminton International ===
Year	Gold	Silver	Bronze	Total
2024	14	9	25	48

=== 4 Nations Para Badminton International Level 1 ===
Year	Gold	Silver	Bronze	Total
2024	3	7	4	14

=== Bahrain Para Badminton International ===
Year	Gold	Silver	Bronze	Total
2024	4	6	11	21

=== Spanish Para Badminton International Level 1 ===
Year	Gold	Silver	Bronze	Total
2024	5	5	7	17

=== Spanish Para Badminton International Level 2 ===
Year	Gold	Silver	Bronze	Total
2024	6	6	10	22

=== Para Badminton World Championship ===
Year	Gold	Silver	Bronze	Total
2024	3	4	11	18

=== Egypt Para Badminton International ===
Year	Gold	Silver	Bronze	Total
2024	7	9	15	31

=== Dubai Para Badminton International ===
Year	Gold	Silver	Bronze	Total
2023	1	5	8	14

=== Japan Para Badminton International ===
Year	Gold	Silver	Bronze	Total
2023	4	4	10	18

=== Asian Para Games ===
Year	Gold	Silver	Bronze	Total
2023	4	4	13	21

=== Western Australia Para Badminton International ===
Year	Gold	Silver	Bronze	Total
2023	5	6	9	20

=== 4th Nations Para Badminton International ===
Year	Gold	Silver	Bronze	Total
2023	3	5	10	18

=== Uganda Para Badminton International ===
Year	Gold	Silver	Bronze	Total
2023	13	12	17	42

=== Canada Para Badminton International ===
Year	Gold	Silver	Bronze	Total
2023	5	5	10	20

=== Bahrain Para Badminton International ===
Year	Gold	Silver	Bronze	Total
2023	3	8	12	23

=== Thailand Para Badminton International ===
Year	Gold	Silver	Bronze	Total
2023	4	4	8	16

=== Brazil Para Badminton International ===
Year	Gold	Silver	Bronze	Total
2023	8	7	13	28

=== Spanish Para Badminton International(Level 1) ===
Year	Gold	Silver	Bronze	Total
2023	4	2	4	10

=== Spanish Para Badminton International(Level 2) ===
Year	Gold	Silver	Bronze	Total
2023	4	7	7	18

=== Para Badminton World Championship ===
Year	Gold	Silver	Bronze	Total
2022	2	2	12	16

=== Uganda Para Badminton International ===
Year	Gold	Silver	Bronze	Total
2022	12	14	16	42

=== Indonesia Para Badminton International ===
Year	Gold	Silver	Bronze	Total
2022	0	2	1	3

=== Thailand Para Badminton International ===
Year	Gold	Silver	Bronze	Total
2022	4	5	8	17

=== Ireland Para Badminton International ===
Year	Gold	Silver	Bronze	Total
2022	2	4	5	11

=== Canada Para Badminton International ===
Year	Gold	Silver	Bronze	Total
2022	2	1	6	9

=== 4thFazza Dubai Para Badminton International ===
Year	Gold	Silver	Bronze	Total
2022	5	5	7	17

=== Bahrain Para Badminton International ===
Year	Gold	Silver	Bronze	Total
2022	7	3	13	28

=== Brazil Para Badminton International ===
Year	Gold	Silver	Bronze	Total
2022	8	7	13	28

=== Spanish Para Badminton International (Level 1) ===
Year	Gold	Silver	Bronze	Total
2022	5	6	9	20

=== Spanish Para Badminton International (Level 2) ===
Year	Gold	Silver	Bronze	Total
2022	11	7	16	34

=== Asian Youth Para Games Bahrain ===
Year	Gold	Silver	Bronze	Total
2021	4	7	4	15

=== Uganda Para Badminton International ===
Year	Gold	Silver	Bronze	Total
2021	16	14	17	47

=== Tokyo Paralympics ===
Year	Gold	Silver	Bronze	Total
2021	2	1	1	4

=== Dubai Para Badminton International ===
Year	Gold	Silver	Bronze	Total
2021	5	6	10	21

=== Peru Para Badminton International ===
Year	Gold	Silver	Bronze	Total
2020	7	5	3	15

=== Brazil Para Badminton International ===
Year	Gold	Silver	Bronze	Total
2020	4	5	2	11

=== Japan Para Badminton International ===
Year	Gold	Silver	Bronze	Total
2019	2	1	4	7

=== Denmark Para Badminton International ===
Year	Gold	Silver	Bronze	Total
2019	2	4	4	10

=== China Para Badminton International ===
Year	Gold	Silver	Bronze	Total
2019	2	1	3	6

=== Thailand Para Badminton International ===
Year	Gold	Silver	Bronze	Total
2019	3	4	6	13

=== Para Badminton World Championship ===
Year	Gold	Silver	Bronze	Total
2019	3	4	5	12

=== Irish Para Badminton International ===
Year	Gold	Silver	Bronze	Total
2019	4	3	5	12

=== Canada Para Badminton International ===
Year	Gold	Silver	Bronze	Total
2019	3	2	4	9

=== Uganda Para Badminton International ===
Year	Gold	Silver	Bronze	Total
2019	11	8	8	27

=== Dubai Para Badminton International ===
Year	Gold	Silver	Bronze	Total
2019	4	3	2	9

=== Turkish Para Badminton International ===
Year	Gold	Silver	Bronze	Total
2019	3	5	3	11

=== IWAS world games ===
Year	Gold	Silver	Bronze	Total
2019	4	3	3	10

=== Australia Para Badminton International ===
Year	Gold	Silver	Bronze	Total
2018	2	2	2	6

=== Denmark Para Badminton International ===
Year	Gold	Silver	Bronze	Total
2018	3	0	3	6

=== Asian para games ===
Year	Gold	Silver	Bronze	Total
2018	3	0	6	9

=== Japan Para Badminton International ===
Year	Gold	Silver	Bronze	Total
2018	1	1	2	4

=== Brazil Para Badminton International ===
Year	Gold	Silver	Bronze	Total
2018	1	3	0	4

=== Thailand Para Badminton International ===
Year	Gold	Silver	Bronze	Total
2018	2	1	3	6

=== Irish Para Badminton International ===
Year	Gold	Silver	Bronze	Total
2018	0	1	1	2

=== Turkish Para Badminton International ===
Year	Gold	Silver	Bronze	Total
2018	1	1	4	6

=== Uganda Para Badminton International ===
Year	Gold	Silver	Bronze	Total
2018	4	3	3	10

=== Dubai Para Badminton International ===
Year	Gold	Silver	Bronze	Total
2018	2	5	9	16

=== Spanish Para Badminton International ===
Year	Gold	Silver	Bronze	Total
2018	2	1	3	6

=== Asian Youth Para Games Dubai ===
Year	Gold	Silver	Bronze	Total
2017	0	2	1	3

=== Para Badminton World Championship ===
Year	Gold	Silver	Bronze	Total
2017	2	2	6	10

=== Japan Para Badminton International ===
Year	Gold	Silver	Bronze	Total
2017	2	3	3	8

=== USA Para Badminton International ===
Year	Gold	Silver	Bronze	Total
2017	1	3	1	5

=== Uganda Para Badminton International ===
Year	Gold	Silver	Bronze	Total
2017	5	6	4	15

=== Thailand Para Badminton International ===
Year	Gold	Silver	Bronze	Total
2017	2	3	2	7

=== Spanish Para Badminton International ===
Year	Gold	Silver	Bronze	Total
2017	0	0	2	2

=== Turkish Para Badminton International ===
Year	Gold	Silver	Bronze	Total
2017	2	2	0	4

=== Indonesia Para Badminton International ===
Year	Gold	Silver	Bronze	Total
2016	1	0	2	3

=== Irish Para Badminton International ===
Year	Gold	Silver	Bronze	Total
2016	0	2	5	7

=== Asian Para Badminton Championship ===
Year	Gold	Silver	Bronze	Total
2016	4	2	7	13

=== Para Badminton World Championship ===
Year	Gold	Silver	Bronze	Total
2015	4	3	5	12

== GKEHPC ==
The GKEHPC (Gaurav Khanna Excellence High Performance Center) features six world-class courts, including four synthetic courts and two wooden courts, providing athletes with an ideal environment to refine their skills and elevate their game. The center also includes a fully equipped gym, allowing athletes to build strength and improve performance under expert supervision.

A dedicated wellness area enables athletes to recover and rejuvenate, offering facilities such as sauna baths, steam baths, and ice baths, which are essential for post-training relaxation and muscle recovery. Additionally, a specialized physiotherapy room ensures that athletes receive high-quality medical care and rehabilitation support, helping prevent injuries and maintain peak physical condition.

GKEBA has been awarded with "BEST ACADEMY AWARD" by The Radient Differently Abled Sports Award, 2023.

The GKEHPC is dedicated to differently abled athletes, where all categories of athletes, including Polio affected, hearing impaired, accidental injured, injured army personnel in wheelchairs, dwarfs, neuro damaged athletes, and others, not only practice together for free, but also receive education under the dome of Excellia School and Galgotias University. These athletes stay in Shri Gaurav Khanna's house in Omaxe City, Lucknow. This residence is also known as the "Drona Paralympic House" among para athletes.

== Professional Life ==
Shri Khanna has diverse credentials in Badminton. Other than being an established high-performance coach, Shri Khanna is a Qualified International Umpire and Qualified International Referee of Badminton Asia, having travelled throughout the world to officiate and represent the country in over 100 international sporting events. At several national and international multisport events in India and abroad, Shri Khanna has held positions as Competition Director, Competition Manager, Live Scorer, Match Controller, and Technical Official.

== Personal life ==
It is widely recognized that Shri Gaurav Khanna has played a significant role in the development of para badminton in the country. Born on 11 December 1975, he experienced challenges in his early life. Despite these difficulties, he remained committed to his work and focused on supporting others. His experiences are featured in the National Geographic documentary series #One For Change, which highlights his journey and the factors that influenced his path. He has contributed to the promotion of sports for persons with disabilities and has been involved in their progression from grassroots levels to international events such as the Deaflympics and Paralympics, working in roles including coach, technical official, organizer, and advisor.

Shri Khanna has completed his education from KVS, RDSO, Lucknow, received his B.COM degree (1995), Bachelor of Physical Education degree (1996), Diploma in Yoga (1998) from Lucknow University as well as NIS-Badminton (2010) and Master Trainers in Sports and Games for the Disability (2011) from SAI Bangalore and LNIPE, Gwalior respectively.
