= Sukant Kadam =

Indian para-badminton player (born 1993)

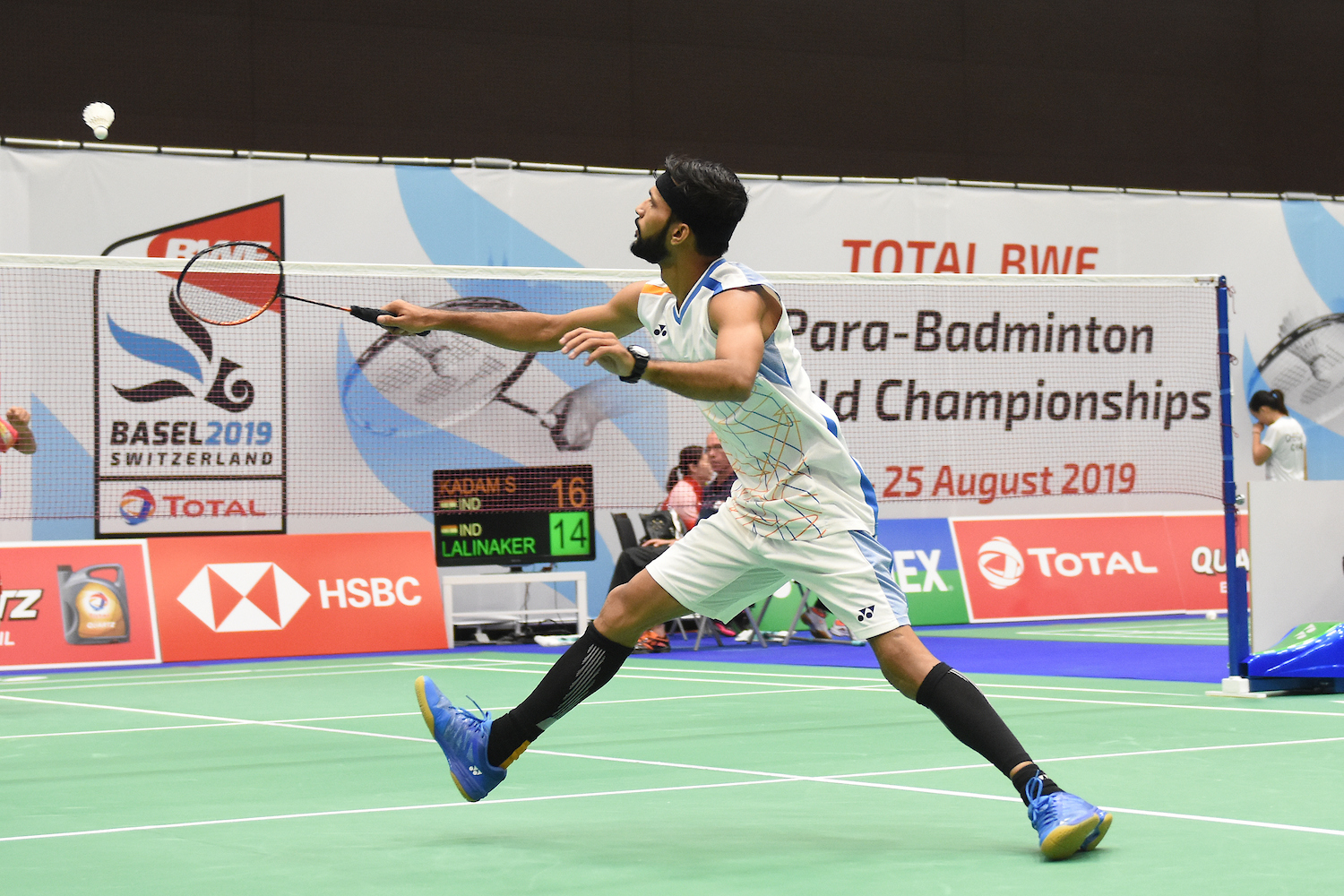
- Kadam at the 2019 BWF Para-Badminton World Championships

Personal information
- Born: 9 May 1993 (age 33) Kautholi, Maharashtra, India
- Years active: 2014–present
- Height: 170 cm (5 ft 7 in)
- Weight: 60 kg (132 lb)

Sport
- Country: India
- Sport: Badminton
- Handedness: Right
- Coached by: Nikhil Kanetkar and Mayank Gole

Men's singles SL4 Men's doubles SL3–SL4
- Highest ranking: 1 (MS 1 September 2025); 1 (MD with Pramod Bhagat 18 July 2023)
- Current ranking: 3 (MS); 1 (MD with Pramod Bhagat) (16 December 2025)
- BWF profile
Medal record
Men's para-badminton
Representing India
World Championships
Gold medal – first place	2026 Manama	Men's doubles
Bronze medal – third place	2019 Basel	Men's singles
Bronze medal – third place	2022 Tokyo	Men's singles
Bronze medal – third place	2024 Pattaya	Men's singles
Bronze medal – third place	2024 Pattaya	Men's doubles
Bronze medal – third place	2026 Manama	Men's singles
World Abilitysport Games
Gold medal – first place	2019 Sharjah	Men's singles
Silver medal – second place	2019 Sharjah	Men's doubles
Asian Para Games
Bronze medal – third place	2018 Jakarta	Men's team
Bronze medal – third place	2022 Hangzhou	Men's singles
Bronze medal – third place	2022 Hangzhou	Men's doubles
Asian Championships
Bronze medal – third place	2016 Beijing, China	Men's doubles
Gold medal – first place	2025 Korat, Thailand	Men's doubles

Sukant Kadam (born 9 May 1993) is an Indian professional para-badminton player from Maharashtra. He qualified to represent India at the 2024 Summer Paralympics at Paris. He completes in men's singles SL4 category.

== Early life and education ==
Kadam was born in Kautholi, Sangli, Maharashtra. He shifted to Pune and completed his mechanical engineering at Government College Of Engineering and Research, Avasari Khurd in 2015 with first class. Later, he joined Nikhil Kanetkar Badminton Academy and trained under coaches Nikhil Kanetkar and Mayank Gole.

== Personal life ==
Kadam was employed with Nikhil Kanetkar Badminton Academy as an assistant coach from July 2015 to August 2018. After winning a bronze medal win at the Asian Para Badminton Championship 2016, he was appointed as a Taluka Sports Officer (Group-II) by the Government of Maharashtra on 10 January 2019. During his first year of mechanical engineering in January 2011, he failed to get selected for class team but after a year of practice, he made it to the college team.

== Career ==
Kadam made his international debut in 2014 at the England Para Badminton International and became world number 2 in the SL4 category on 12 June 2017. He won a bronze medal in MD SL3, SL4 at the Para Badminton Asian Championships in 2016. Later, he won his first title at the Uganda Para-Badminton International in 2017. He won a bronze medal at the Asian Para Games in 2018. He won a bronze medal at the BWF Para Badminton World Championships in 2019, 2022 and 2024.

== Achievements ==
=== 2024 Summer Paralympics ===
Men's singles SL4

Year	Venue	Opponent	Score	Result
2024	Porte de La Chapelle Arena, Paris, France	(India) Suhas Lalinakere Yathiraj (Indonesia) Fredy Setiawan	17–21, 12–21; 17–21, 18–21	Finished 4th

=== World Championships ===
Men's singles SL4

Year	Venue	Opponent	Score	Result
2019	St. Jakobshalle, Basel, Switzerland	(France) Lucas Mazur	11–21, 13–21	Bronze
2022	Yoyogi National Gymnasium, Tokyo, Japan	(Indonesia) Fredy Setiawan	20–22, 15–21	Bronze
2024	Pattaya Exhibition and Convention Hall, Pattaya, Thailand	(Indonesia) Fredy Setiawan	13–21, 19–21	Bronze
2026	Isa Sports City, Manama, Bahrain	(France) Lucas Mazur	16–21, 3–21	Bronze

Men's doubles SL3–SL4

Year	Venue	Partner	Opponent	Score	Result
2024	Pattaya Exhibition and Convention Hall, Pattaya, Thailand	(India) Pramod Bhagat	(Thailand) Mongkhon Bunsun (Thailand) Siripong Teamarrom	16–21, 16–21	Bronze
2026	Isa Sports City, Manama, Bahrain	(India) Pramod Bhagat	(India) Jagadesh Dilli (India) Naveen Sivakumar	21–19, 21–16	Gold

=== World Abilitysport Games ===
Men's singles SL4

Year	Venue	Opponent	Score	Result
2019	American University of Sharjah, Sharjah, United Arab Emirates	(Thailand) Chok-Uthaikul Watcharaphon	15–21, 21–12, 21–16	Gold

Men's doubles SL3–SL4

Year	Venue	Partner	Opponent	Score	Result
2019 (Note: This tournament uses a round robin system.)	American University of Sharjah, Sharjah, United Arab Emirates	(India) Pramod Bhagat	(Thailand) Pricha Somsiri (Thailand) Chok-Uthaikul Watcharaphon	14–21, 13–21	Silver
2019	American University of Sharjah, Sharjah, United Arab Emirates	(India) Pramod Bhagat	(Thailand) Mongkhon Bunsun (Iraq) Ramel Syawesh	21–13, 21–5	Silver
2019	American University of Sharjah, Sharjah, United Arab Emirates	(India) Pramod Bhagat	(India) Sharad Chandra Joshi (Thailand) Thaweesap Nattaphon	21–13, 21–4	Silver
2019	American University of Sharjah, Sharjah, United Arab Emirates	(India) Pramod Bhagat	(United Arab Emirates) Sultan Al Halyan (Yemen) Saleh Mohammed Ali	Walkover	Silver

=== Asian Para Games ===
Team standing SL3–SU5

Year	Venue	Opponent	Score	Result
2018	Istora Gelora Bung Karno, Jakarta, Indonesia	Malaysia at the 2018 Asian Para Games	1-2	Bronze

Men's singles SL4

Year	Venue	Opponent	Score	Result
2022	Binjiang Gymnasium, Hangzhou, China	(Malaysia) Mohd Amin Burhanuddin	21–23, 9–21	Bronze

Men's doubles SL3–SL4

Year	Venue	Partner	Opponent	Score	Result
2022	Binjiang Gymnasium, Hangzhou, China	(India) Pramod Bhagat	(Indonesia) Dwiyoko (Indonesia) Fredy Setiawan	22–20, 21–23, 12–21	Bronze

=== Asian Championship ===
Men's doubles SL3–SL4

Year	Venue	Partner	Opponent	Score	Result
2016	China Administration of Sport for Persons with Disabilities, Beijing, China	(India) Pramod Bhagat	(Malaysia) Muhammad Huzairi Abdul Malek (Malaysia) Bakri Omar	21–18, 11–21, 16–21	Bronze
2025	Nakhon Ratchasima (Korat), Thailand	(India) Kumar Nitesh	(India) Jagdish DILLI (India) Naveen SIVAKUMAR	21–17, 11–21, 21–11	Gold

=== BWF Para Badminton World Circuit (7 titles, 8 runners-up) ===
The BWF Para Badminton World Circuit – Grade 2, Level 1, 2 and 3 tournaments has been sanctioned by the Badminton World Federation from 2022.

Men's singles SL4

Year	Tournament	Level	Opponent	Score	Result
2022	Spanish Para Badminton International II	Level 2	(Germany) Marcel Adam	21–13, 21–18	(gold) Winner
2022	Brazil Para Badminton International	Level 2	(India) Tarun Dhillon	17–21, 22–20, 18–21	(silver) Runner-up
2022	Thailand Para Badminton International	Level 1	(France) Lucas Mazur	2–21, 17–21	(silver) Runner-up
2022	Peru Para Badminton International	Level 2	(Singapore) Ang Chee Hiong	21–14, 21–15	(gold) Winner
2023	Spanish Para Badminton International	Level 2	(India) Tarun Dhillon	21–12, 8–21, 13–21	(silver) Runner-up
2023	Thailand Para Badminton International	Level 2	(India) Suhas Lalinakere Yathiraj	14–21, 21–17, 11–21	(silver) Runner-up
2023	Western Australia Para Badminton International	Level 2	(Indonesia) Fredy Setiawan	12–21, 8–21	(silver) Runner-up
2024	Spanish Para Badminton International II	Level 2	(India) Tarun Dhillon	13–21, 21–16, 16–21	(silver) Runner-up

Men's doubles SL3–SL4

Year	Tournament	Level	Partner	Opponent	Score	Result
2022	Spanish Para Badminton International II	Level 2	(India) Kumar Nitesh	(India) Pramod Bhagat (India) Manoj Sarkar	19–21, 21–11, 11–21	(silver) Runner-up
2022	Dubai Para Badminton International	Level 2	(India) Pramod Bhagat	(Indonesia) Dwiyoko (Indonesia) Fredy Setiawan	18–21, 13–21	(silver) Runner-up
2023	Spanish Para Badminton International	Level 2	(India) Pramod Bhagat	(India) Kumar Nitesh (India) Tarun Dhillon	22–20, 12–21, 21–9	(gold) Winner
2023	Brazil Para Badminton International	Level 2	(India) Pramod Bhagat	(South Korea) Joo Dong-jae (South Korea) Shin Kyung-hwan	22–20, 21–19	(gold) Winner
2023	Thailand Para Badminton International	Level 2	(India) Pramod Bhagat	(India) Kumar Nitesh (India) Tarun Dhillon	18–21, 21–14, 21–19	(gold) Winner
2023	Bahrain Para Badminton International	Level 2	(India) Pramod Bhagat	(India) Kumar Nitesh (India) Tarun Dhillon	22–24, 21–9, 21–14	(gold) Winner
2023	4 Nations Para Badminton International	Level 1	(India) Pramod Bhagat	(India) Deep Ranjan Bisoyee (India) Manoj Sarkar	21–17, 21–17	(gold) Winner

=== International tournaments (from 2011–2021) (7 titles, 14 runners-up) ===
Men's singles SL4

Year	Tournament	Opponent	Score	Result
2017	Uganda Para Badminton International	(India) Anand Kumar Boregowda	17–21, 21–11, 21–17	(gold) Winner
2017	Turkish Para Badminton International	(India) Suhas Lalinakere Yathiraj	16–21, 10–21	(silver) Runner-up
2018	Spanish Para Badminton International	(South Korea) Shin Kyung-hwan	21–16, 21–16	(gold) Winner
2018	Dubai Para Badminton International	(France) Lucas Mazur	16–21, 18–21	(silver) Runner-up
2018	Uganda Para Badminton International	(France) Guillaume Gailly	21–5, 21–18	(gold) Winner
2018	Irish Para Badminton International	(Indonesia) Fredy Setiawan	21–11, 18–21, 14–21	(silver) Runner-up
2018	Brazil Para Badminton International	(India) Anand Kumar Boregowda	21–14, 21–14	(gold) Winner
2018	Japan Para Badminton International	(France) Lucas Mazur	10–21, 17–21	(silver) Runner-up
2018	Denmark Para Badminton International	(Sweden) Rickard Nilsson	21–10, 21–15	(gold) Winner
2018	Australia Para Badminton International	(Indonesia) Fredy Setiawan	19–21, 12–21	(silver) Runner-up
2019	Uganda Para Badminton International	(India) Tarun Dhillon	12–21, 20–22	(silver) Runner-up
2020	Peru Para Badminton International	(India) Suhas Lalinakere Yathiraj	19–21, 16–21	(silver) Runner-up
2021	Dubai Para Badminton International	(France) Lucas Mazur	15–21, 6–21	(silver) Runner-up
2021	Uganda Para Badminton International	(India) Nilesh Gaikwad	21–16, 17–21, 21–10	(silver) Runner-up

Men's doubles SL3–SL4

Year	Tournament	Partner	Opponent	Score	Result
2018	Uganda Para Badminton International	(India) Umesh Vikram Kumar	(Nigeria) Bello Rafiu Oyebanji (Nigeria) Chukwuebuka Sunday Eze	21–10, 21–12	(gold) Winner
2018	Irish Para Badminton International	(Indonesia) Suryo Nugroho	(Indonesia) Dheva Anrimusthi (Indonesia) Hafizh Briliansyah Prawiranegara	9–21, 13–21	(gold) Winner
2018	Brazil Para Badminton International	(Japan) Daisuke Fujihara	(France) Guillaume Gailly (France) Mathieu Thomas	23–25, 21–16, 14–21	(silver) Runner-up
2018	Australia Para Badminton International	(India) Pramod Bhagat	(Indonesia) Dwiyoko (Indonesia) Fredy Setiawan	23–25, 24–22, 20–22	(silver) Runner-up
2021	Dubai Para Badminton International	(India) Kumar Nitesh	(India) Pramod Bhagat (India) Manoj Sarkar	18–21, 16–21	(silver) Runner-up

Doubles SL3–SL4

Year	Tournament	Partner	Opponent	Score	Result
2017	Uganda Para Badminton International	(India) Umesh Vikram Kumar	(India) Anand Kumar Boregowda (India) Manoj Sarkar	14–21, 16–21	(silver) Runner-up
2017	Turkish Para Badminton International	(France) Mathieu Thomas	(Spain) Simón Cruz Mondejar (India) Suhas Lalinakere Yathiraj	15–21, 21–17, 19–21	(silver) Runner-up

== Medals ==
=== International medals ===
Year	Gold medal	Silver medal	Bronze medal	Total
2016			2	2
2017	1	3	4	8
2018	5	7	6	18
2019	1	2	9	12
2020		1	1	2
2021	1	2	1	4
2022	3	3	2	8
2023	5	3	7	15
2024	1	3	3	7
2025	6	7		13
Total	23	31	35	89

* Statistics were last updated on 19 December 2025.

== Awards ==
- He received the Shiv Chhatrapati Award for 2017–2018 by the state government of Maharashtra.

== See also ==
- Olympic Gold Quest
