= Fredy Setiawan =

Indonesian para-badminton player (born 1991)

Personal information
- Born: 29 November 1991 (age 34) Surakarta, Central Java, Indonesia
- Height: 165 cm (5 ft 5 in)

Sport
- Country: Indonesia
- Sport: Badminton

Men's singles SL4 Men's doubles SL3–SL4 Mixed doubles SL3–SU5
- Highest ranking: 2 (MS 1 April 2019); 1 (MD with Dwiyoko 6 April 2019); 4 (XD with Khalimatus Sadiyah 6 April 2019)
- Current ranking: 5 (MS); 1 (MD with Dwiyoko); 9 (XD with Khalimatus Sadiyah) (8 November 2022)
- BWF profile
Medal record
Men's para-badminton
Representing Indonesia
Paralympic Games
| Silver medal – second place | 2024 Paris | Mixed doubles |
| Bronze medal – third place | 2020 Tokyo | Men's singles |
| Bronze medal – third place | 2024 Paris | Men's singles |
World Championships
| Gold medal – first place | 2022 Tokyo | Mixed doubles |
| Gold medal – first place | 2024 Pattaya | Men's doubles |
| Silver medal – second place | 2022 Tokyo | Men's singles |
| Silver medal – second place | 2024 Pattaya | Men's singles |
| Silver medal – second place | 2024 Pattaya | Mixed doubles |
| Bronze medal – third place | 2017 Ulsan | Men's singles |
| Bronze medal – third place | 2019 Basel | Men's singles |
World Abilitysport Games
| Gold medal – first place | 2023 Nakhon Ratchasima | Men's singles |
| Silver medal – second place | 2023 Nakhon Ratchasima | Mixed doubles |
Asian Para Games
| Gold medal – first place | 2014 Incheon | Men's singles |
| Gold medal – first place | 2014 Incheon | Mixed doubles |
| Gold medal – first place | 2018 Jakarta | Men's doubles |
| Gold medal – first place | 2018 Jakarta | Men's team |
| Silver medal – second place | 2014 Incheon | Men's doubles |
| Silver medal – second place | 2018 Jakarta | Men's singles |
| Silver medal – second place | 2022 Hangzhou | Men's doubles |
| Silver medal – second place | 2022 Hangzhou | Mixed doubles |
| Silver medal – second place | 2026 Aichi–Nagoya | Men's singles |
| Bronze medal – third place | 2022 Hangzhou | Men's singles |
Asian Championships
| Bronze medal – third place | 2025 Nakhon Ratchasima | Mixed doubles |
ASEAN Para Games
| Gold medal – first place | 2011 Surakarta | Mixed doubles |
| Gold medal – first place | 2015 Singapore | Mixed doubles |
| Gold medal – first place | 2015 Singapore | Men's team |
| Gold medal – first place | 2022 Surakarta | Men's singles |
| Gold medal – first place | 2022 Surakarta | Men's doubles |
| Gold medal – first place | 2022 Surakarta | Mixed doubles |
| Gold medal – first place | 2022 Surakarta | Men's team |
| Gold medal – first place | 2023 Cambodia | Men's team |
| Gold medal – first place | 2025 Nakhon Ratchasima | Men's doubles |
| Silver medal – second place | 2015 Singapore | Men's doubles |
| Silver medal – second place | 2017 Kuala Lumpur | Men's doubles |
| Silver medal – second place | 2017 Kuala Lumpur | Mixed doubles |
| Silver medal – second place | 2025 Nakhon Ratchasima | Men's singles |
| Silver medal – second place | 2025 Nakhon Ratchasima | Mixed doubles |
| Bronze medal – third place | 2011 Surakarta | Men's singles |
| Bronze medal – third place | 2011 Surakarta | Men's doubles |
| Bronze medal – third place | 2015 Singapore | Men's singles |
| Bronze medal – third place | 2017 Kuala Lumpur | Men's singles |

Fredy Setiawan (born 29 November 1991) is an Indonesian para-badminton player. He won the bronze medal in the men singles SL4 event of the 2020 Summer Paralympics.

== Awards and nominations ==
| Award | Year | Category | Result | Ref. |
|---|---|---|---|---|
| Indonesian Sport Awards | 2018 | Most Favorited Male Para Athlete Pairs (with Dwiyoko) | Nominated | |
| Indonesian Sport Awards | 2018 | Most Favorited Men's Team Para Athlete (with 2018 Asian Para Games Men's Team) | Won | |

== Achievements ==
=== Paralympic Games ===
Men's singles SL4

| Year | Venue | Opponent | Score | Result |
|---|---|---|---|---|
| 2020 | Yoyogi National Gymnasium, Tokyo, Japan | (India) Tarun Dhillon | 21–17, 21–11 | Bronze |
| 2024 | Porte de La Chapelle Arena, Paris, France | (India) Sukant Kadam | 21–17, 21–18 | Bronze |

Mixed doubles SL3–SU5

| Year | Venue | Partner | Opponent | Score | Result |
|---|---|---|---|---|---|
| 2024 | Porte de La Chapelle Arena, Paris, France | (Indonesia) Khalimatus Sadiyah | (Indonesia) Hikmat Ramdani (Indonesia) Leani Ratri Oktila | 16–21, 15–21 | Silver |

=== World Championships ===
Men's singles SL4

| Year | Venue | Opponent | Score | Result |
|---|---|---|---|---|
| 2017 | Dongchun Gymnasium, Ulsan, South Korea | (France) Lucas Mazur | 4–21, 8–21 | Bronze |
| 2019 | St. Jakobshalle, Basel, Switzerland | (India) Tarun Dhillon | 14–21, 16–21 | Bronze |
| 2022 | Yoyogi National Gymnasium, Tokyo, Japan | (France) Lucas Mazur | 12–21, 17–21 | Silver |
| 2024 | Pattaya Exhibition and Convention Hall, Pattaya, Thailand | (India) Suhas Lalinakere Yathiraj | 18–21, 18–21 | Silver |

Men's doubles SL3–SL4

| Year | Venue | Partner | Opponent | Score | Result |
|---|---|---|---|---|---|
| 2024 | Pattaya Exhibition and Convention Hall, Pattaya, Thailand | (Indonesia) Dwiyoko | (Thailand) Mongkhon Bunsun (Thailand) Siripong Teamarrom | 21–17, 21–14 | Gold |

Mixed doubles SL3–SU5

| Year | Venue | Partner | Opponent | Score | Result |
|---|---|---|---|---|---|
| 2022 | Yoyogi National Gymnasium, Tokyo, Japan | (Indonesia) Khalimatus Sadiyah | (Thailand) Siripong Teamarrom (Thailand) Nipada Saensupa | 21–15, 21–12 | Gold |
| 2024 | Pattaya Exhibition and Convention Hall, Pattaya, Thailand | (Indonesia) Khalimatus Sadiyah | (Indonesia) Hikmat Ramdani (Indonesia) Leani Ratri Oktila | 9–21, 16–21 | Silver |

=== World Abilitysport Games ===
Men's singles SL4

| Year | Venue | Opponent | Score | Result |
|---|---|---|---|---|
| 2023 | Terminal 21 Korat Hall, Nakhon Ratchasima, Thailand | (Indonesia) Hikmat Ramdani | 21–18, 21–9 | Gold |

Mixed doubles SL3–SU5

| Year | Venue | Partner | Opponent | Score | Result |
|---|---|---|---|---|---|
| 2023 | Terminal 21 Korat, Nakhon Ratchasima, Thailand | (Indonesia) Khalimatus Sadiyah | (Indonesia) Hikmat Ramdani (Indonesia) Leani Ratri Oktila | 8–21, 19–21 | Silver |

=== Asian Para Games ===
Men's singles SL4

| Year | Venue | Opponent | Score | Result |
|---|---|---|---|---|
| 2014 | Gyeyang Gymnasium, Incheon, South Korea | (India) Tarun Dhillon | 22–20, 21–18 | Gold |
| 2018 | Istora Gelora Bung Karno, Jakarta, Indonesia | (India) Tarun Dhillon | 21–10, 13–21, 19–21 | Silver |
| 2022 | Binjiang Gymnasium, Hangzhou, China | (India) Suhas Lalinakere Yathiraj | 12–21, 19–21 | Bronze |
| 2026 | Ichinomiya City Municipal Gymnasium, Ichinomiya, Japan | (India) Naveen Sivakumar | 9–21, 17–21 | Silver |

Men's doubles SL3–SL4

| Year | Venue | Partner | Opponent | Score | Result |
|---|---|---|---|---|---|
| 2014 | Gyeyang Gymnasium, Incheon, South Korea | (Indonesia) Dwiyoko | (Indonesia) Hary Susanto (Indonesia) Ukun Rukaendi | 15–21, 13–21 | Silver |
| 2018 | Istora Gelora Bung Karno, Jakarta, Indonesia | (Indonesia) Dwiyoko | (South Korea) Jeon Sun-woo (South Korea) Joo Dong-jae | 22–20, 22–20 | Gold |
| 2022 | Binjiang Gymnasium, Hangzhou, China | (Indonesia) Dwiyoko | (India) Kumar Nitesh (India) Tarun Dhillon | 21–9, 19–21, 20–22 | Silver |

Mixed doubles SL3–SU5

| Year | Venue | Partner | Opponent | Score | Result |
|---|---|---|---|---|---|
| 2014 | Gyeyang Gymnasium, Incheon, South Korea | (Indonesia) Leani Ratri Oktila | (India) Raj Kumar (India) Parul Parmar | 21–14, 21–15 | Gold |
| 2022 | Binjiang Gymnasium, Hangzhou, China | (Indonesia) Khalimatus Sadiyah | (Indonesia) Hikmat Ramdani (Indonesia) Leani Ratri Oktila | 7–21, 8–21 | Silver |

=== Asian Championships ===
Mixed doubles

| Year | Venue | Partner | Opponent | Score | Result | Ref |
|---|---|---|---|---|---|---|
| 2025 | SPADT Convention Center, Nakhon Ratchasima, Thailand | (Indonesia) Khalimatus Sadiyah | (India) Ruthick Ragupathi (India) Manasi Joshi | 21–19, 14–21, 22–24 | Bronze | |

=== ASEAN Para Games ===
Men's singles SL4

| Year | Venue | Opponent | Score | Result |
|---|---|---|---|---|
| 2011 | Sritex Arena Sports Center, Surakarta, Indonesia | (Malaysia) Bakri Omar | 21–13, 19–21, 20–22 | Bronze |
| 2015 | OCBC Arena, Singapore | (Indonesia) Hary Susanto | 18–21, 16–21 | Bronze |
| 2017 | Axiata Arena, Kuala Lumpur, Malaysia | (Thailand) Chawarat Kittichokwattana | 19–21, 14–21 | Bronze |
| 2022 | Edutorium Muhammadiyah University of Surakarta, Surakarta, Indonesia | (Indonesia) Hikmat Ramdani | 21–17, 21–19 | Gold |
| 2025 | SPDAT Convention Center, Nakhon Ratchasima Sports Complex, Nakhon Ratchasima, Thailand | (Indonesia) Hikmat Ramdani | 21–14, 18–21, 19–21 | Silver |

Men's doubles SL3–SL4

| Year | Venue | Partner | Opponent | Score | Result |
|---|---|---|---|---|---|
| 2011 | Sritex Arena Sports Center, Surakarta, Indonesia | (Indonesia) Dwiyoko | (Indonesia) Imam Kunantoro (Indonesia) Suryo Nugroho | 17–21, 14–21 | Bronze |
| 2015 | OCBC Arena, Singapore | (Indonesia) Dwiyoko | (Indonesia) Hary Susanto (Indonesia) Ukun Rukaendi | 7–21, 21–12, 17–21 | Silver |
| 2017 | Axiata Arena, Kuala Lumpur, Malaysia | (Indonesia) Dwiyoko | (Indonesia) Hary Susanto (Indonesia) Ukun Rukaendi | 15–21, 16–21 | Silver |
| 2022 | Edutorium Muhammadiyah University of Surakarta, Surakarta, Indonesia | (Indonesia) Dwiyoko | (Indonesia) Hary Susanto (Indonesia) Ukun Rukaendi | 21–14, 15–21, 21–10 | Gold |
| 2025 | SPDAT Convention Center, Nakhon Ratchasima Sports Complex, Nakhon Ratchasima, Thailand | (Indonesia) Dwiyoko | (Indonesia) Maman Nurjaman (Indonesia) Hikmat Ramdani | 21–18, 23–21 | Gold |

Mixed doubles SL3–SU5

| Year | Venue | Partner | Opponent | Score | Result |
|---|---|---|---|---|---|
| 2011 | Sritex Arena Sports Center, Surakarta, Indonesia | (Indonesia) Nur Juani | (Thailand) Winai Vatjanaprom (Thailand) Nipada Saensupa | 16–21, 21–19, 21–15 | Gold |
| 2015 | OCBC Arena, Singapore | (Indonesia) Leani Ratri Oktila | (Thailand) Dachaton Saengrayakul (Thailand) Nipada Saensupa | 21–11, 21–11 | Gold |
| 2017 | Axiata Arena, Kuala Lumpur, Malaysia | (Indonesia) Khalimatus Sadiyah | (Indonesia) Hary Susanto (Indonesia) Leani Ratri Oktila | 11–21, 13–21 | Silver |
| 2022 (Note: This tournament uses a round robin system.) | Edutorium Muhammadiyah University of Surakarta, Surakarta, Indonesia | (Indonesia) Khalimatus Sadiyah | (Indonesia) Khoirur Roziqin (Indonesia) Warining Rahayu | 21–9, 21–14 | Gold |
| 2022 | Edutorium Muhammadiyah University of Surakarta, Surakarta, Indonesia | (Indonesia) Khalimatus Sadiyah | (Thailand) Siripong Teamarrom (Thailand) Nipada Saensupa | 21–11, 26–24 | Gold |
| 2022 | Edutorium Muhammadiyah University of Surakarta, Surakarta, Indonesia | (Indonesia) Khalimatus Sadiyah | (Thailand) Pricha Somsiri (Thailand) Darunee Henpraiwan | Walkover | Gold |
| 2025 | SPDAT Convention Center, Nakhon Ratchasima Sports Complex, Nakhon Ratchasima, Thailand | (Indonesia) Khalimatus Sadiyah | (Indonesia) Hikmat Ramdani (Indonesia) Leani Ratri Oktila | 7–21, 4–21 | Silver |

=== BWF Para Badminton World Circuit (19 titles, 18 runners-up) ===
The BWF Para Badminton World Circuit – Grade 2, Level 1, 2 and 3 tournaments has been sanctioned by the Badminton World Federation from 2022.

Men's singles SL4

| Year | Tournament | Level | Opponent | Score | Result | Ref |
|---|---|---|---|---|---|---|
| 2022 | Dubai Para Badminton International | Level 2 | (India) Tarun Dhillon | 21–11, 9–21, 23–21 | (gold) Winner | |
| 2022 | Indonesia Para Badminton International | Level 3 | (Indonesia) Hikmat Ramdani | 18–21, 18–21 | (silver) Runner-up | |
| 2023 | Spanish Para Badminton International | Level 1 | (France) Lucas Mazur | 22–24, 12–21 | (silver) Runner-up | |
| 2023 | 4 Nations Para Badminton International | Level 1 | (France) Lucas Mazur | 12–21, 21–23 | (silver) Runner-up | |
| 2023 | Indonesia Para Badminton International | Level 3 | (Malaysia) Mohd Amin Burhanuddin | 18–21, 22–20, 21–17 | (gold) Winner | |
| 2023 | Western Australia Para Badminton International | Level 2 | (India) Sukant Kadam | 21–12, 21–8 | (gold) Winner | |
| 2023 | Japan Para Badminton International | Level 2 | (Malaysia) Mohd Amin Burhanuddin | 15–21, 19–21 | (silver) Runner-up | |
| 2024 | Bahrain Para Badminton International | Level 2 | (India) Tarun Dhillon | 23–21, 21–18 | (gold) Winner | |
| 2024 | Indonesia Para Badminton International | Level 2 | (India) Sukant Kadam | 21–14, 21–14 | (gold) Winner | |
| 2024 | Bahrain Para Badminton International | Level 1 | (Indonesia) Hikmat Ramdani | 20–22, 23–21, 14–21 | (silver) Runner-up | |
| 2026 | China Para Badminton International | Level 2 | (India) Naveen Sivakumar | 14–21, 16–21 | (silver) Runner-up | |

Men's doubles SL3–SL4

| Year | Tournament | Level | Partner | Opponent | Score | Result | Ref |
|---|---|---|---|---|---|---|---|
| 2022 | Dubai Para Badminton International | Level 2 | (Indonesia) Dwiyoko | (Indonesia) Ukun Rukaendi (Indonesia) Hikmat Ramdani | 21–18, 21–16 | (gold) Winner | |
| 2022 | Thailand Para Badminton International | Level 1 | (Indonesia) Dwiyoko | (India) Pramod Bhagat (India) Sukant Kadam | 18–21, 13–21 | (silver) Runner-up | |
| 2022 | Indonesia Para Badminton International | Level 3 | (Indonesia) Dwiyoko | (Indonesia) Ukun Rukaendi (Indonesia) Hary Susanto | 21–17, 21–13 | (gold) Winner | |
| 2023 | Indonesia Para Badminton International | Level 3 | (Indonesia) Dwiyoko | (Indonesia) Maman Nurjaman (Indonesia) Hikmat Ramdani | 20–22, 21–18, 21–18 | (gold) Winner | |
| 2024 | Indonesia Para Badminton International | Level 2 | (Indonesia) Dwiyoko | (India) Nehal Gupta (India) Naveen Sivakumar | 21–19, 21–18 | (gold) Winner | |
| 2024 | Bahrain Para Badminton International | Level 1 | (Indonesia) Dwiyoko | (India) Deep Ranjan Bisoyee (India) Manoj Sarkar | 21–14, 21–18 | (gold) Winner | |
| 2025 | Indonesia Para Badminton International | Level 1 | (Indonesia) Dwiyoko | (India) Pramod Bhagat (India) Sukant Kadam | 16–21, 12–21 | (silver) Runner-up | |
| 2026 | French Para Badminton International | Level 2 | (Indonesia) Hikmat Ramdani | (India) Naveen Sivakumar (India) Surya Kant Yadav | 21–12, 21–15 | (gold) Winner | |
| 2026 | British & Irish Para Badminton International | Level 1 | (Indonesia) Hikmat Ramdani | (India) Naveen Sivakumar (India) Surya Kant Yadav | 21–18, 21–9 | (gold) Winner | |
| 2026 | China Para Badminton International | Level 2 | (Indonesia) Hikmat Ramdani | (India) Naveen Sivakumar (India) Surya Kant Yadav | 21–16, 19–21, 21–10 | (gold) Winner | |
| 2026 | Japan Para Badminton International | Level 2 | (Indonesia) Hikmat Ramdani | (India) Pramod Bhagat (India) Sukant Kadam | 21–5, 21–15 | (gold) Winner | |

Mixed doubles SL3–SU5

| Year | Tournament | Level | Partner | Opponent | Score | Result | Ref |
|---|---|---|---|---|---|---|---|
| 2022 | Dubai Para Badminton International | Level 2 | (Indonesia) Khalimatus Sadiyah | (Japan) Taiyo Imai (Japan) Noriko Ito | 21–11, 18–21, 21–7 | (gold) Winner | |
| 2022 | Indonesia Para Badminton International | Level 3 | (Indonesia) Khalimatus Sadiyah | (Indonesia) Hafizh Briliansyah Prawiranegara (Indonesia) Qonitah Ikhtiar Syakuroh | 21–15, 12–21, 21–10 | (gold) Winner | |
| 2023 | Bahrain Para Badminton International | Level 2 | (Indonesia) Khalimatus Sadiyah | (Indonesia) Hikmat Ramdani (Indonesia) Leani Ratri Oktila | 7–21, 21–16, 15–21 | (silver) Runner-up | |
| 2023 | Canada Para Badminton International | Level 1 | (Indonesia) Khalimatus Sadiyah | (Indonesia) Hikmat Ramdani (Indonesia) Leani Ratri Oktila | 12–21, 21–19, 12–21 | (silver) Runner-up | |
| 2023 | Indonesia Para Badminton International | Level 3 | (Indonesia) Khalimatus Sadiyah | (Indonesia) Hikmat Ramdani (Indonesia) Leani Ratri Oktila | 10–21, 17–21 | (silver) Runner-up | |
| 2023 | Western Australia Para Badminton International | Level 2 | (Indonesia) Khalimatus Sadiyah | (India) Kumar Nitesh (India) Thulasimathi Murugesan | 21–15, 20–22, 19–21 | (silver) Runner-up | |
| 2023 | Japan Para Badminton International | Level 2 | (Indonesia) Khalimatus Sadiyah | (Indonesia) Hikmat Ramdani (Indonesia) Leani Ratri Oktila | 15–21, 13–21 | (silver) Runner-up | |
| 2024 | Bahrain Para Badminton International | Level 2 | (Indonesia) Leani Ratri Oktila | (India) Jagadesh Dilli (Italy) Rosa Efomo De Marco | 21–8, 21–15 | (gold) Winner | |
| 2024 | 4 Nations Para Badminton International | Level 1 | (Indonesia) Khalimatus Sadiyah | (Indonesia) Hikmat Ramdani (Indonesia) Leani Ratri Oktila | 9–21, 11–21 | (silver) Runner-up | |
| 2024 | Indonesia Para Badminton International | Level 2 | (Indonesia) Khalimatus Sadiyah | (Indonesia) Hikmat Ramdani (Indonesia) Leani Ratri Oktila | 12–21, 10–21 | (silver) Runner-up | |
| 2024 | Bahrain Para Badminton International | Level 1 | (Indonesia) Khalimatus Sadiyah | (Indonesia) Hikmat Ramdani (Indonesia) Leani Ratri Oktila | 6–21, 9–21 | (silver) Runner-up | |
| 2025 | Thailand Para Badminton International | Level 2 | (Indonesia) Khalimatus Sadiyah | (India) Abhijeet Sakhuja (India) Palak Kohli | 21–11, 21–14 | (gold) Winner | |
| 2025 | British & Irish Para Badminton International | Level 1 | (Indonesia) Khalimatus Sadiyah | (Brazil) Rogério de Oliveira (Brazil) Edwarda Dias | 21–10, 21–5 | (gold) Winner | |
| 2025 | Indonesia Para Badminton International | Level 1 | (Indonesia) Khalimatus Sadiyah | (Indonesia) Hikmat Ramdani (Indonesia) Leani Ratri Oktila | 6–21, 9–21 | (silver) Runner-up | |
| 2026 | British & Irish Para Badminton International | Level 1 | (Indonesia) Khalimatus Sadiyah | (Indonesia) Hikmat Ramdani (Indonesia) Leani Ratri Oktila | 4–21, 15–21 | (silver) Runner-up | |

=== International tournaments (from 2011–2021) (17 titles, 8 runners-up) ===
Men's singles SL4

| Year | Tournament | Opponent | Score | Result |
|---|---|---|---|---|
| 2015 | Indonesia Para-Badminton International | (Thailand) Chawarat Kittichokwattana | 21–18, 21–16 | (gold) Winner |
| 2016 | Indonesia Para-Badminton International | (France) Lucas Mazur | 19–21, 21–16, 21–19 | (gold) Winner |
| 2018 | Irish Para-Badminton International | (India) Sukant Kadam | 11–21, 21–18, 21–14 | (gold) Winner |
| 2018 | Australian Para-Badminton International | (India) Sukant Kadam | 21–19, 21–12 | (gold) Winner |
| 2019 | China Para-Badminton International | (France) Lucas Mazur | 14–21, 7–21 | (silver) Runner-up |
| 2019 | Denmark Para-Badminton International | (France) Lucas Mazur | 21–17, 21–16 | (gold) Winner |

Men's doubles SL3–SL4

| Year | Tournament | Partner | Opponent | Score | Result |
|---|---|---|---|---|---|
| 2014 | Indonesia Para-Badminton International | (Indonesia) Dwiyoko | (Indonesia) Ukun Rukaendi (Indonesia) Hary Susanto | 11–21, 11–21 | (silver) Runner-up |
| 2015 | Indonesia Para-Badminton International | (Indonesia) Dwiyoko | (Indonesia) Ukun Rukaendi (Japan) Daisuke Fujihara | 21–14, 21–17 | (gold) Winner |
| 2017 | Thailand Para-Badminton International | (Japan) Daisuke Fujihara | (India) Pramod Bhagat (India) Manoj Sarkar | 22–20, 21–16 | (gold) Winner |
| 2018 | Dubai Para-Badminton International | (India) Kumar Nitesh | (Indonesia) Ukun Rukaendi (Indonesia) Hary Susanto | 17–21, 15–21 | (silver) Runner-up |
| 2018 | Thailand Para-Badminton International | (Indonesia) Dwiyoko | (Indonesia) Ukun Rukaendi (Indonesia) Hary Susanto | 21–19, 21–23, 21–17 | (gold) Winner |
| 2018 | Australian Para-Badminton International | (Indonesia) Dwiyoko | (India) Pramod Bhagat (India) Sukant Kadam | 25–23, 22–24, 22–20 | (gold) Winner |
| 2019 | Turkish Para-Badminton International | (Indonesia) Dwiyoko | (India) Kumar Nitesh (India) Tarun Dhillon | 21–14, 21–15 | (gold) Winner |
| 2019 | Dubai Para-Badminton International | (Indonesia) Dwiyoko | (Germany) Jan-Niklas Pott (Germany) Pascal Wolter | 21–15, 21–18 | (gold) Winner |
| 2019 | Canada Para-Badminton International | (Indonesia) Dwiyoko | (India) Pramod Bhagat (India) Manoj Sarkar | 21–19, 21–10 | (gold) Winner |
| 2019 | China Para-Badminton International | (Indonesia) Suryo Nugroho | (Malaysia) Mohamad Faris Ahmad Azri (Malaysia) Cheah Liek Hou | 12–21, 15–21 | (silver) Runner-up |
| 2019 | Denmark Para-Badminton International | (Indonesia) Suryo Nugroho | (India) Chirag Baretha (India) Raj Kumar | 21–14, 21–14 | (gold) Winner |
| 2020 | Brazil Para-Badminton International | (Indonesia) Suryo Nugroho | (India) Raj Kumar (India) Rakesh Pandey | 21–10, 8–21, 21–10 | (gold) Winner |
| 2021 | Dubai Para-Badminton International | (Indonesia) Suryo Nugroho | (France) Méril Loquette (France) Lucas Mazur | 19–21, 21–13, 19–21 | (silver) Runner-up |

Mixed doubles SL3–SU5

| Year | Tournament | Partner | Opponent | Score | Result |
|---|---|---|---|---|---|
| 2014 | Indonesia Para-Badminton International | (Indonesia) Leani Ratri Oktila | (Indonesia) Suryo Nugroho (Indonesia) Khalimatus Sadiyah | 19–21, 17–21 | (silver) Runner-up |
| 2015 | Indonesia Para-Badminton International | (Indonesia) Leani Ratri Oktila | (Indonesia) Arya Sadewa (Indonesia) Sriyanti | 21–9, 21–7 | (gold) Winner |
| 2016 | Indonesia Para-Badminton International | (Indonesia) Leani Ratri Oktila | (Indonesia) Hary Susanto (Indonesia) Khalimatus Sadiyah | 21–13, 21–16 | (gold) Winner |
| 2018 | Irish Para-Badminton International | (Indonesia) Khalimatus Sadiyah | (Indonesia) Hary Susanto (Indonesia) Leani Ratri Oktila | 5–21, 15–21 | (silver) Runner-up |
| 2018 | Thailand Para-Badminton International | (Indonesia) Khalimatus Sadiyah | (Indonesia) Hary Susanto (Indonesia) Leani Ratri Oktila | 5–21, 10–21 | (silver) Runner-up |
| 2019 | China Para-Badminton International | (Indonesia) Khalimatus Sadiyah | (Thailand) Siripong Teamarrom (Thailand) Nipada Saensupa | 18–21, 21–16, 21–9 | (gold) Winner |
