= Dhall Kakka =

Village in Punjab, Pakistan

Dhall Kakka ڈھل ککہ
- Village
- Location in Punjab Pakistan
- Coordinates: 32°48′33″N 73°56′06″E
- Country: Pakistan
- Province: Punjab
- Division: Gujrat
- District: Gujrat
- Tehsil: Kharian

Dhall Kakka is a medium size village comprising approximately 600 houses in the tehsil of Kharian, Gujrat District, in the Punjab province of Pakistan. The word Dhall is used for a number of different things, including a shield or buckler. Dhall is a clan of the Jutt tribe. the people belonging to the Dhall clan live in India and Pakistan. Possibly the people belonging to Dhall clan lived here before partition. Presence of Dhall clan is evident in census of 1901 and 1911 in the Pakistani punjab. It is said that Kakka was a landlord of the area during 16th century. Probably he belonged to the Dhall clan of the Jutt tribe. Meaning of name Kakka is not exactly known but Kakka in punjabi language is taken as a grey, however its origin dates back to Indus Valley Civilization and it was given as a surname to respected people. Baba Kakka had three sons Barkhurdar, Hayat Muhammad and Khushi Muhammad. People of many tribes and clans live in the village mostly Muslim Jutt. Before Indo-Pak partition, Hindus also lived along with Muslims however, after their departure in 1947 the village welcomed migrants from Kashmir. The original village consists of narrow brick paved streets surrounded by a ring of major street. However over a past few decades construction of new houses has spread over suburbs. Historically main source of income for residents of Dhal Kakka was through agriculture and cattle farming. Muslim residents enjoyed close trade ties with Hindu neighbours. However now major source of money for the residents comes from hardworking professionals working abroad in Europe, Middle East and United States. Village Dhal Kakka has produced many respectable Teachers, Civil Servants, Military Servicemen, Businessmen, Engineers and Doctors. Dhal Kakka is known for its Bull racing, Wrestling (kabaddi), Football, Cricket, Islamic education and female education.
