= Dal Dozzi =

Australian rules footballer

Del Dozzi

Personal information
- Full name: Adelio Paul Dozzi
- Born: 10 December 1936
- Died: 6 October 2012 (aged 75)
- Original team: Brunswick YCW
- Height: 183 cm (6 ft 0 in)
- Weight: 70 kg (154 lb)

Playing career^{1}
Years	Club	Games (Goals)
1956	North Melbourne	4 (0)
- ^{1} Playing statistics correct to the end of 1956.

Adelio Paul "Del" Dozzi (10 December 1936 – 6 October 2012) was an Australian rules footballer who played with North Melbourne in the Victorian Football League (VFL).
