= Prantiya Rakshak Dal =

Indian security forces

- Common name: Prantiya Rakshak Dal
- Abbreviation: PRD

Agency overview
- Formed: December 11, 1948; 77 years ago
- Employees: 45,000 active personnel in Uttar Pradesh
- Annual budget: ₹265 crore (US$28 million) (2023–2024)

Jurisdictional structure
- Operations jurisdiction: India
- Legal jurisdiction: Uttar Pradesh, Uttarakhand
- Governing body: Youth Welfare & Prantiya Rakshak Dal
- Constituting instrument: Prantiya Rakshak Dal Act and Rules

Operational structure
- Headquarters: Lucknow, India
- Minister responsible: Somendra Tomar, Minister of State (Independent Charge) Government Of Uttar Pradesh
- Agency executive: Suhas Lalinakere Yathiraj, IAS, Secretary & Director General
- Parent agency: Youth Welfare & Prantiya Rakshak Dal

The Prantiya Rakshak Dal is a security force in Uttar Pradesh, established in 1948 by the Government of Uttar Pradesh. It is regulated under the Prantiya Rakshak Dal Act and Rules. The Department of Youth Welfare & Prantiya Rakshak Dal (PRD) in Uttar Pradesh oversees the security force's operations. The department is currently headed by Chief Minister Yogi Adityanath.

As of the year 2020, the force included 45,000 personnel. Prantiya Rakshak Dal works to maintain security and peace in challenging situations. The IAS officer Suhas Lalinakere Yathiraj has been serving as the current Secretary and Director General of Youth Welfare and Prantiya Rakshak Dal since his appointment in February 2023.

== History ==
Prantiya Rakshak Dal (PRD) was founded in 1948 as an alternate security force to maintain community harmony and peace in rural areas, to make them self-reliant and disciplined, for self-protection, and to prevent crimes.

It was formed under the United Provinces Armed Constabulary Act of 1948, and came into effect on December 11, 1948, as published in the official gazette of the Uttar Pradesh government.

When the PRD was founded in 1948, it was initially placed under the Home Department. In 1952, it was transferred to the Planning Department to facilitate manpower mobilization for various state activities.

== Eligibility and payscale ==
The minimum qualification for the position is a high school education; however, candidates must also meet specified height and weight requirements. Individuals aged between 18 and 45 are eligible to apply. Recruitment is on the basis of daily wages, and individuals receive a daily payment of Rs 500 with no additional allowances. They receive a monthly remuneration of ₹15000. Their dress code and duty hours are both fixed.

In Prantiya Rakshak Dal, youths from rural areas are primarily recruited. However, in December 2022, the government announced the recruitment of youths from urban cities.

The Prantiya Rakshak Dal has been operating in the state of Uttarakhand since 1948. The educational qualification for Regional Youth Welfare and Prantiya Rakshak Dal officers in Uttar Pradesh and Uttarakhand is a bachelor's degree from a recognized university or any other qualification deemed equivalent by the government.

== Responsibilities ==
PRD personnel are deployed in security arrangements at police stations, traffic management, fairs, pilgrimage sites, and other places. They are also deployed to assist the police in various tasks. Along with police stations, PRD Jawan's are also deployed in many government institutions.
