= Dal Bahadur Gurung =

Indian comedian (1922–1992)

Hum Jayega
- Born: 1922; Darjeeling, India
- Died: 27 April 1992; Darjeeling, India
- Occupation: Comedian
- Known for: Prominent figure and legendary person often cited as a funny character in folklores and jokes in Eastern Nepal, Darjeeling, Kalimpong, Sikkim, Assam and Manipur
- Title: Hum Jayega

Dal Bahadur Gurung, popularly known as Hum Jayega (हम जाएगा) (1922–1992) is a person often cited as a funny character in folklore and jokes in Nepal, Darjeeling, Kalimpong, Sikkim, Assam and Manipur. Because of several unrealistic jokes and tales about him, many people considered him to be imaginary.

== Birth ==
He was born in Chongtong Tea Estate of Darjeeling, India in March 1922. His ancestors were from Makluwa, a hamlet in Panchthar district of Nepal. Hum Jayega's great grandfather Dhaujbeer Gurung migrated along with his family in 1814 AD.

== Early life ==
In 1936, he ran away to Calcutta to become a pilot, but it was not possible due to his poor academic background. With hurdles and economic hardships, he hanged around an engineering college and learned driving with a professor who was fond of his jokes. In 1948, he returned to Darjeeling. With his driving skills, he became cab driver with a post Second World War short-chassis Land Rover. He was the first driver ever to take a vehicle to the summit of Tiger Hill, Darjeeling and Tumling. In this new circle of friends he was popular by his nickname Hum Jayega. Whenever the tourists asked who will go on the muddy underdeveloped roads to the hills, he used to answer "hum jayega" (meaning "I'll go" in Hindi) and this is how he got his nickname.

== Career ==
His famous jokes were available as three booklets but some pirated versions were also published. Currently, his jokes are popular over the Internet and several facebook pages. Most of these jokes are in Nepali, lingua franca of Darjeeling, Nepal and surrounding areas but many of them have been translated to English. In 1985 he was screened for about two minutes in a popular Nepali movie Kusume Rumal and it cleared that he is not just an imaginary character.

He continued working as a driver until he was 53 and engaged in publishing booklets of his jokes. His daughter remembers him as a responsible father who looked after the children even after his wife's death. He was concerned about the good education and future of the children and grandchildren. He was a father of four daughters and one son. However it is also said that Hum Jayega lost all his wealth due to his drinking habit, leaving his family to live in poverty. But the misery was never able to estrange Hum Jayega from laughing and making others laugh. He died in April 1992.

== In popular culture ==
The first collection of jokes based on the escapades of Hum Jayega was published by Bijoy Kumar Rai as 'Humjayegako Diary' in 1982, which consisted of two volumes. It was published under the banner of Sajha Pustak Prakashan (publishers) in Darjeeling.
