= Nilesh Gaikwad =

Indian para badminton player (born 1996)

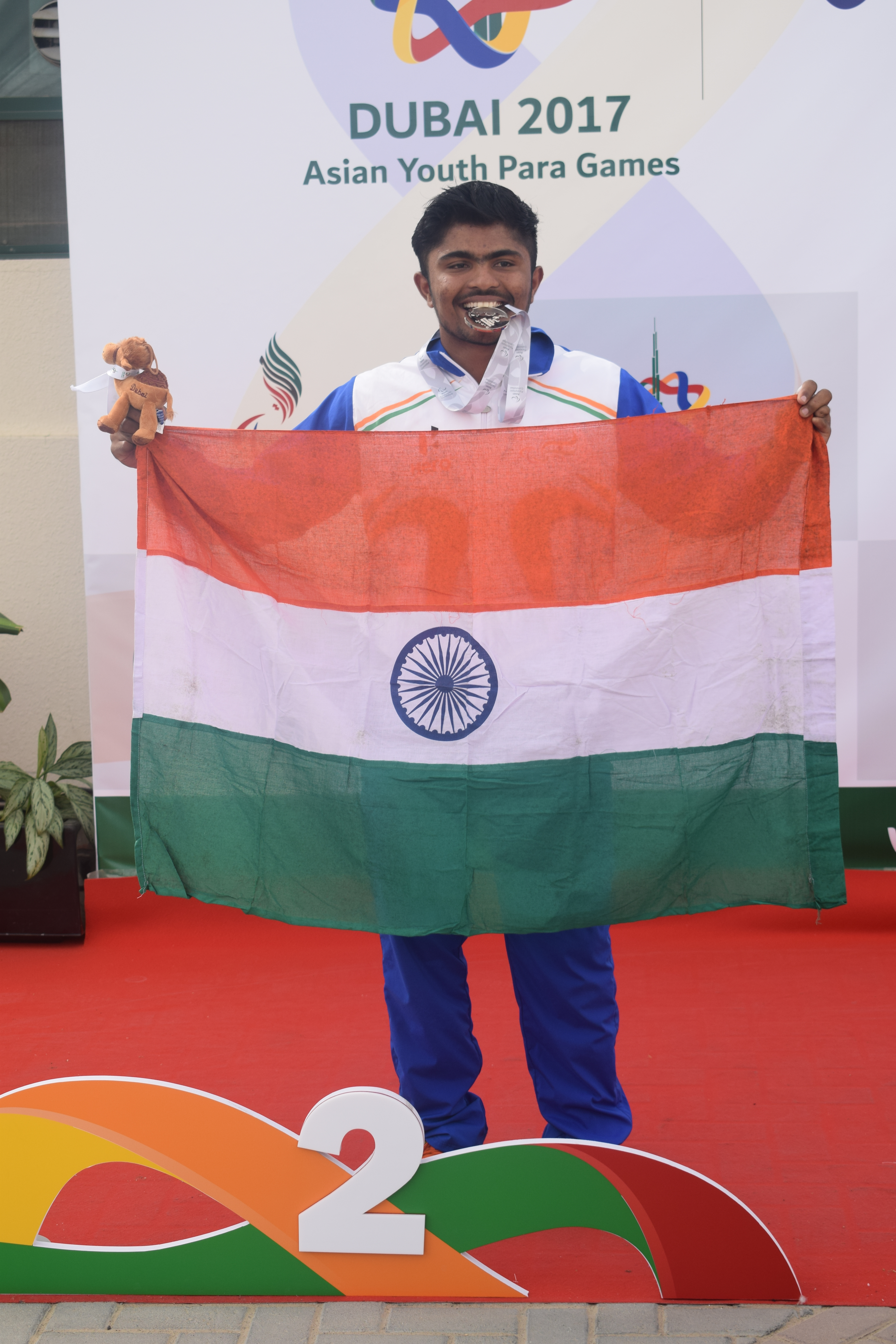
- Gaikwad at the 2017 Asian Youth Para Games

Personal information
- Born: 10 June 1996 (age 30) Maharashtra, India
- Years active: 2017-present
- Height: 5 ft 6 in (168 cm)
- Weight: 68 kg (150 lb)

Sport
- Country: India
- Sport: Badminton
- Coached by: Gaurav Khanna

Men's singles SL4
- Career title: 1
- Highest ranking: 4 (MS 23 May 2022) (23 May 2022)
- Current ranking: 8 (MS) (12 December 2022)
Medal record
Men's para badminton
Representing India
Asian Youth Para Games
Silver medal – second place	2017 Dubai	Men's singles

Nilesh Balu Gaikwad (born 10 June 1996) is an Indian para badminton player. He made his international debut in the Uganda Para-Badminton International in 2017, where he won first place in the men's doubles.

He reached a career-high ranking of 4 in May 2022. Nilesh was always looking for the right pair of shoes for his legs and Nivia Sports made his quest successful by designing special shoes for him.

== Achievements ==
=== Asian Youth Para Games ===
Boys' singles

Year	Venue	Opponent	Score	Result
2017	Al Wasl Club, Dubai, United Arab Emirates	(Indonesia) Hikmat Ramdani	8–21, 20–22	Silver

=== International Tournaments (1 title, 1 runner-up) ===
Men's singles

Year	Tournament	Opponent	Score	Result
2021	Uganda Para Badminton International	(India) Sukant Kadam	16–21, 21–17, 10–21	(silver) Runner-up

Men's doubles

Year	Tournament	Partner	Opponent	Score	Result
2017 (Note: This tournament uses a round robin system.)	Uganda Para Badminton International	(Poland) Bartłomiej Mróz	(Uganda) Hussein Kasalirwe Kato (Uganda) Anthony Opoka	21–3, 21–7	(gold) Winner
2017	Uganda Para Badminton International	(Poland) Bartłomiej Mróz	(Uganda) George Byarugaba (Uganda) Isa Kasadha	21–3, 21–2	(gold) Winner
2017	Uganda Para Badminton International	(Poland) Bartłomiej Mróz	(India) Sugil Abbas (India) Pankaj Singh	21–19, 21–12	(gold) Winner
