= Dahl =

Dahl may refer to:

- Dahl (surname)
- Dal (or dahl, or dhal), a dish or preparation of lentils or other pulses

== Places ==
=== Germany ===
- Hagen-Dahl, Hagen, Ruhrgebiet
- Kürten-Dahl, Kürten, Rheinisch-Bergischer Kreis
- Marienheide-Dahl, Marienheide, Oberbergischer Kreis
- Mönchengladbach-Dahl, Mönchengladbach
- Dahl, a location in Olpe, Germany
- Paderborn-Dahl, Paderborn
- Dahl, Solingen
- Waldbröl-Dahl, Waldbröl, Oberbergischer Kreis
- Dahl, Wiehl, Oberbergischer Kreis
- Dahl, Wipperfürth, Oberbergischer Kreis

=== Luxembourg ===
- Dahl, a village in the commune of Goesdorf

== Fiction ==
- Dahl (Foundation universe), a sector of the fictional planet Trantor in Isaac Asimov's Foundation series
- Dahl, a corporation in the video game series Borderlands

== See also ==
- Dal (disambiguation)
- Daal (disambiguation)
