= Daal =

Daal or DAAL may refer to:

- Dal (also daal), a dried pulse which has been split
- Dāl, Arabic letter د
- Ḏāl, Arabic letter ذ
- Data Analytics Acceleration Library, a library of optimized algorithmic building blocks for data analysis stages
- Dali (goddess), whose name is sometimes transliterated as "Daal"
- Mung Daal, a character in the cartoon show Chowder

== See also ==
- Dal (disambiguation)
- Dahl (disambiguation)
