= Mak (given name) =

Male given name

- Gender: Male

Origin
- Meaning: Poppy
- Region of origin: Europe

Mak is a male given name.

In the Balkans, Mak is a male given name that is most popular among Bosniaks in the former Yugoslav nations. In Serbo-Croatian, Mak translates to poppy. The name was popularized by the Bosnian poet Mak Dizdar and is now one of the most common names for newborn males in Bosnia and Herzegovina.

== Given name ==
- Mak Dizdar (1917–1971), Bosnian poet
- Mak Varešanović (born 1998), Bosnian footballer
