= Shin Kyung-hwan =

South Korean para-badminton player

Personal information
- Born: 30 August 1987 (age 38) Jeju City, South Korea
- Height: 1.72 m (5 ft 8 in)

Sport
- Country: South Korea
- Sport: Badminton
- Handedness: Right

Men's singles SL4 Men's doubles SL3–SL4
- Highest ranking: 5 (MS 14 May 2019); 2 (MD with Joo Dong-jae 25 June 2024)
- Current ranking: 7 (MS); 2 (MD with Joo Dong-jae) (17 September 2024)
Medal record
Men's para-badminton
Representing South Korea
World Championships
Bronze medal – third place	2015 Stoke Mandeville	Men's doubles
Bronze medal – third place	2017 Ulsan	Men's doubles
Bronze medal – third place	2022 Tokyo	Men's doubles
Asian Para Games
Bronze medal – third place	2022 Hangzhou	Men's doubles
Asian Championships
Bronze medal – third place	2016 Beijing	Men's singles
Bronze medal – third place	2016 Beijing	Men's doubles

Shin Kyung-hwan (Korean: 신경환; born 30 August 1987) is a South Korean para-badminton player. He participated in the men's singles SL4 event at the 2020 Summer Paralympics but was eliminated in the group stage.

== Biography ==
Shin became disabled in a traffic accident while doing public service work as an adult. After that, he learned about disabled badminton through a senior's recommendation and has been active as a player ever since.

== Achievements ==
=== World Championships ===
Men's doubles SL3–SL4

Year	Venue	Partner	Opponent	Score	Result
2015	Stoke Mandeville Stadium, Stoke Mandeville, England	(South Korea) Kim Gi-yeon	(Poland) Bartłomiej Mróz (Turkey) İlker Tuzcu	16–21, 13–21	Bronze
2017	Dongchun Gymnasium, Ulsan, South Korea	(South Korea) Kim Gi-yeon	(Malaysia) Cheah Liek Hou (Malaysia) Hairol Fozi Saaba	16–21, 13–21	Bronze
2022	Yoyogi National Gymnasium, Tokyo, Japan	(South Korea) Joo Dong-jae	(Indonesia) Hikmat Ramdani (Indonesia) Ukun Rukaendi	21–18, 8–21, 18–21	Bronze

=== Asian Para Games ===
Men's doubles SL3–SL4

Year	Venue	Partner	Opponent	Score	Result
2022	Binjiang Gymnasium, Hangzhou, China	(South Korea) Joo Dong-jae	(India) Kumar Nitesh (India) Tarun Dhillon	16–21, 12–21	Bronze

=== Asian Championships ===
Men's singles SL4

Year	Venue	Opponent	Score	Result
2016	China Administration of Sport for Persons with Disabilities, Beijing, China	(India) Suhas Lalinakere Yathiraj	21–16, 10–21, 14–21	Bronze

Men's doubles SL3–SL4

Year	Venue	Partner	Opponent	Score	Result
2016	China Administration of Sport for Persons with Disabilities, Beijing, China	(South Korea) Kim Gi-yeon	(Indonesia) Oddie Listyanto Putra (Indonesia) Suryo Nugroho	23–25, 5–21	Bronze

=== BWF Para Badminton World Circuit (1 title, 3 runners-up) ===
The BWF Para Badminton World Circuit – Grade 2, Level 1, 2 and 3 tournaments has been sanctioned by the Badminton World Federation from 2022.

Men's singles SL4

Year	Tournament	Level	Opponent	Score	Result
2022	Bahrain Para-Badminton International	Level 2	(India) Tarun Dhillon	9–21, 9–21	(silver) Runner-up

Men's doubles SL3–SL4

Year	Tournament	Level	Partner	Opponent	Score	Result
2023	Brazil Para-Badminton International	Level 2	(South Korea) Joo Dong-jae	(India) Pramod Bhagat (India) Sukant Kadam	20–22, 19–21	(silver) Runner-up
2023	Dubai Para-Badminton International	Level 2	(South Korea) Joo Dong-jae	(South Korea) Cho Na-dan (India) Manoj Sarkar	19–21, 21–19, 21–16	(silver) Runner-up
2024	Spanish Para-Badminton International II	Level 2	(South Korea) Joo Dong-jae	(India) Deep Ranjan Bisoyee (India) Manoj Sarkar	10–21, 21–18, 21–16	(gold) Winner

=== International tournaments (2011–2021) (7 runners-up) ===
Men's singles SL4

Year	Tournament	Opponent	Score	Result
2017	Japan Para-Badminton International	(India) Anand Kumar Boregowda	21–12, 19–21, 21–12	(silver) Runner-up
2018	Spanish Para-Badminton International	(India) Sukant Kadam	16–21, 16–21	(silver) Runner-up
2018	Thailand Para-Badminton International	(France) Lucas Mazur	11–21, 17–21	(silver) Runner-up
2019	Thailand Para-Badminton International	(France) Lucas Mazur	7–21, 6–21	(silver) Runner-up

Men's doubles SL3–SL4

Year	Tournament	Partner	Opponent	Score	Result
2017	Japan Para-Badminton International	(South Korea) Kim Gi-yeon	(Malaysia) Cheah Liek Hou (Malaysia) Hairol Fozi Saaba	16–21, 21–13, 10–21	(silver) Runner-up
2018	Spanish Para-Badminton International	(South Korea) Kim Gi-yeon	(Japan) Taiyo Imai (Turkey) İlker Tuzcu	25–23, 10–21, 19–21	(silver) Runner-up
2019	Canada Para-Badminton International	(South Korea) Kim Gi-yeon	(India) Raj Kumar (India) Rakesh Pandey	19–21, 16–21	(silver) Runner-up
