= Pakistan at the 2022 Asian Para Games =

- IPC code: PAK
- NPC: National Paralympic Committee of Pakistan

in Hangzhou, China 22–28 October 2023
- Competitors: 11 in 5 sports
- Medals Ranked 24th: Gold 1 Silver 0 Bronze 0 Total 1

Asian Para Games appearances (overview)
- 2010; 2014; 2018; 2022; 2026

Pakistan competed at the 2022 Asian Para Games in Hangzhou, Zhejiang, China, from 22 October 2023 to 28 October 2023. Due to COVID-19 pandemic cases rising in China the event was postponed and rescheduled to October 2023.

== Competitors ==
List of sports and numbers of athletes that participated at the 2022 Asian Para Games:

Sport	Men	Women	Total
Archery	1	0	1
Athletics	1	1	2
Badminton	3	1	4
Table tennis	2	0	2
Wheelchair tennis	2	0	2
Total	9	2	11

== Medals summary ==
=== Medals by sport ===
Medals by sport
Sport	1st place, gold medalist(s)	2nd place, silver medalist(s)	3rd place, bronze medalist(s)	Total
Athletics	1	0	0	1
Total	1	0	0	1

=== Medalist ===
Medal	Name	Sport	Event	Date
Gold	Haider Ali	Athletics	Men's Discus Throw F37	26 October

== Archery ==
=== Men ===
Athlete	Event	Ranking round		Round of 32	Round of 16	Quarterfinals	Semifinals	Final / BM	Rank
Athlete	Event	Score	Seed	Opposition Score	Opposition Score	Opposition Score	Opposition Score	Opposition Score	Rank
Qasim Tahir	Individual Recurve - Open	597	14 Q	J Arachchige Weeratunga (SRI); W 6–0	Jun Gan (CHN); W 6–2	Kwak Geonhwi (KOR); L 2–6	did not advance		

== Athletics ==
=== Field ===
Men

Athlete	Event	Class	Final	
Athlete	Event	Class	Result	Rank
Haider Ali	Discus Throw	F37	51.23	1st place, gold medalist(s)

Women

Athlete	Event	Class	Final	
Athlete	Event	Class	Result	Rank
Laiba Safraz	Shot Put	F46	5.15	10
