= Mohd Amin Burhanuddin =

Malaysian para-badminton player

Personal information
- Born: 20 September 1992 (age 33) Labuan, Malaysia

Sport
- Country: Malaysia
- Sport: Badminton
- Handedness: Right

Men's singles SL4
- Highest ranking: 4 (27 February 2024)
- Current ranking: 5 (8 October 2024)
- BWF profile
Medal record
Men's para-badminton
Representing Malaysia
Asian Para Games
Silver medal – second place	2022 Hangzhou	Men's singles
ASEAN Para Games
Gold medal – first place	2023 Cambodia	Men's singles
Silver medal – second place	2023 Cambodia	Men's team
Bronze medal – third place	2022 Surakarta	Men's singles
Bronze medal – third place	2022 Surakarta	Men's doubles
Bronze medal – third place	2023 Cambodia	Men's doubles

Mohd Amin bin Burhanuddin (born 20 September 1992) is a Malaysian para-badminton player. He won a silver medal at the 2022 Asian Para Games. He made his debut in the 2024 Summer Paralympics but was eliminated in the group stages.

== Biography ==
Amin was born with a right leg defect and had to undergo surgery at birth which caused him to use crutches until he was seven years old.

== Achievements ==
=== Asian Para Games ===
Men's singles SL4

Year	Venue	Opponent	Score	Result
2022	Binjiang Gymnasium, Hangzhou, China	(India) Suhas Lalinakere Yathiraj	21–13, 18–21, 9–21	Silver

=== ASEAN Para Games ===
Men's singles SL4

Year	Venue	Opponent	Score	Result
2022	Edutorium Muhammadiyah University of Surakarta, Surakarta, Indonesia	(Indonesia) Hikmat Ramdani	22–24, 18–21	Bronze
2023	Morodok Techo Badminton Hall, Phnom Penh, Cambodia	(Indonesia) Hikmat Ramdani	21–18, 9–21, 21–14	Gold

Men's doubles SL3–SU5

Year	Venue	Partner	Opponent	Score	Result
2022	Edutorium Muhammadiyah University of Surakarta, Surakarta, Indonesia	(Malaysia) Mohamad Faris Ahmad Azri	(Indonesia) Dheva Anrimusthi (Indonesia) Hafizh Briliansyah Prawiranegara	15–21, 9–21	Bronze
2023	Morodok Techo Badminton Hall, Phnom Penh, Cambodia	(Malaysia) Amyrul Yazid Ahmad Sibi	(Indonesia) Dheva Anrimusthi (Indonesia) Hafizh Briliansyah Prawiranegara	11–21, 9–21	Bronze

=== BWF Para Badminton World Circuit (3 titles, 2 runners-up) ===
The BWF Para Badminton World Circuit – Grade 2, Level 1, 2 and 3 tournaments has been sanctioned by the Badminton World Federation from 2022.

Men's singles SU5

Year	Tournament	Level	Opponent	Score	Result
2023	Bahrain Para-Badminton International	Level 2	(India) Suhas Lalinakere Yathiraj	16–21, 23–21, 21–17	(gold) Winner
2023	Indonesia Para-Badminton International	Level 3	(Indonesia) Fredy Setiawan	21–18, 20–22, 17–21	(silver) Runner-up
2023	Japan Para-Badminton International	Level 2	(Indonesia) Fredy Setiawan	21–15, 21–19	(gold) Winner
2023	Dubai Para-Badminton International	Level 1	(India) Suhas Lalinakere Yathiraj	21–13, 21–16	(gold) Winner

Men's doubles SU5

Year	Tournament	Level	Partner	Opponent	Score	Result
2022	Indonesia Para-Badminton International	Level 2	(Malaysia) Muhammad Fareez Anuar	(Indonesia) Dheva Anrimusthi (Indonesia) Hafizh Briliansyah Prawiranegara	16–21, 10–21	(silver) Runner-up
