= Tarun Dhillon =

Indian para badminton player (born 1994)

Personal information
- Born: 18 August 1994 (age 31) Hissar, Haryana, India
- Height: 170 cm (5 ft 7 in)
- Weight: 57 kg (126 lb)

Sport
- Country: India
- Sport: Badminton

Men's singles SL4 Men's doubles SL3–SL4 Mixed doubles SL3–SU5
- Highest ranking: 1 (MS 4 July 2022); 1 (MD with Kumar Nitesh 2 March 2023); 15 (XD with Jyothi Verma 30 May 2022)
- Current ranking: 6 (MS); 4 (MD with Kumar Nitesh) (3 September 2024)
Medal record
Men's para badminton
Representing India
World Championships
Gold medal – first place	2013 Dortmund	Men's singles
Gold medal – first place	2015 Stoke Mandeville	Men's singles
Gold medal – first place	2019 Basel	Men's singles
Silver medal – second place	2015 Stoke Mandevile	Men's doubles
Silver medal – second place	2017 Ulsan	Men's singles
Silver medal – second place	2019 Basel	Men's doubles
Asian Para Games
Gold medal – first place	2018 Jakarta	Men's singles
Gold medal – first place	2022 Hangzhou	Men's doubles
Silver medal – second place	2014 Incheon	Men's singles
Bronze medal – third place	2018 Jakarta	Men's team
Asian Championships
Bronze medal – third place	2008 Bangalore	Men's doubles

Tarun Dhillon (born 18 August 1994) is an Indian para badminton player from Haryana. He competes in the SL4 category. He qualified to represent India at the 2024 Summer Paralympics in Paris, his second Olympics.

Dhillon has been ranked world number 2 in para-badminton men's Singles SL4. He represented India at the 2020 Summer Paralympics in Tokyo and finished fourth in the SL4 singles category.

He won a gold medal in the men's doubles SL3-SL4 event along with Kumar Nitesh at the 2022 Asian Para Games in Hangzhou, China. Earlier, he won two more Asian Games medals. He had won a silver medal in 2014 and gold medal in the 2018 Asian Para Games.

== Early life ==
Dhillon was born in Hissar, Haryana. When he was 8 years old, he met with an accident while playing football and his right knee was badly injured and two surgeries did not help. He took to badminton and won his first para badminton event at 11. He trains at Shining Star Badminton Academy, Haryana.

== Awards ==
Dhillon received the Arjuna Award in 2022.

== Achievements ==
=== World Championships ===
Men's singles SL4

Year	Venue	Opponent	Score	Result
2013	Helmut-Körnig-Halle, Dortmund, Germany	(Chinese Taipei) Lin Cheng-che	21–15, 21–10	Gold
2015	Stoke Mandeville Stadium, Stoke Mandeville, England	(France) Lucas Mazur	18–21, 21–10, 21–15	Gold
2017	Dongchun Gymnasium, Ulsan, South Korea	(France) Lucas Mazur	18–21, 10–21	Silver
2019	St. Jakobshalle, Basel, Switzerland	(France) Lucas Mazur	14–13^{r}	Silver

Men's doubles SL3–SL4

Year	Venue	Partner	Opponent	Score	Result
2015	Stoke Mandeville Stadium, Stoke Mandeville, England	(India) Pramod Bhagat	(India) Anand Kumar Boregowda (India) Manoj Sarkar	21–7, 14–21, 6–21	Silver
2019	St. Jakobshalle, Basel, Switzerland	(India) Kumar Nitesh	(India) Pramod Bhagat (India) Manoj Sarkar	21–14, 15–21, 16–21	Silver

=== Asian Para Games ===
Men's singles SL4

Year	Venue	Opponent	Score	Result
2014	Gyeyang Gymnasium, Incheon, South Korea	(Indonesia) Fredy Setiawan	20–22, 18–21	Silver
2018	Istora Gelora Bung Karno, Jakarta, Indonesia	(Indonesia) Fredy Setiawan	10–21, 21–13, 21–19	Gold

Men's doubles SL3–SL4

Year	Venue	Partner	Opponent	Score	Result
2022	Binjiang Gymnasium, Guangzhou, China	(India) Kumar Nitesh	(Indonesia) Dwiyoko (Indonesia) Fredy Setiawan	9–21, 21–19, 22–20	Gold

=== Asian Championships ===
Men's doubles SL3–SL4

Year	Venue	Partner	Opponent	Score	Result
2008	Raheja Stadium, Bangalore, India				Bronze

=== BWF Para Badminton World Circuit (6 titles, 9 runners-up) ===
The BWF Para Badminton World Circuit – Grade 2, Level 1, 2 and 3 tournaments has been sanctioned by the Badminton World Federation from 2022.

Men's singles SL4

Year	Tournament	Level	Opponent	Score	Result
2022	Spanish Para Badminton International	Level 1	(France) Lucas Mazur	7–21, 9–21	(silver) Runner-up
2022	Brazil Para Badminton International	Level 2	(India) Sukant Kadam	21–17, 20–22, 21–18	(gold) Winner
2022	Bahrain Para Badminton International	Level 2	(South Korea) Shin Kyung-hwan	21–9, 21–9	(gold) Winner
2022	Dubai Para Badminton International	Level 2	(Indonesia) Fredy Setiawan	11–21, 21–9, 21–23	(silver) Runner-up
2023	Spanish Para Badminton International	Level 2	(India) Sukant Kadam	12–21, 21–8, 21–13	(gold) Winner
2023	Brazil Para-Badminton International	Level 2	(France) Lucas Mazur	7–21, 13–21	(silver) Runner-up
2023	Canada Para Badminton International	Level 1	(France) Lucas Mazur	9–21, 13–21	(silver) Runner-up
2024	Spanish Para Badminton International II	Level 2	(India) Sukant Kadam	21–13, 16–21, 21–16	(gold) Winner
2024	Bahrain Para Badminton International	Level 2	(Indonesia) Fredy Setiawan	21–23, 18–21	(silver) Runner-up

Men's doubles SL3–SL4

Year	Tournament	Level	Partner	Opponent	Score	Result
2022	Brazil Para Badminton International	Level 2	(India) Kumar Nitesh	(India) Mohammad Arwaz Ansari (India) Deep Ranjan Bisoyee	21–13, 17–21, 18–21	(silver) Runner-up
2022	Bahrain Para Badminton International	Level 2	(India) Kumar Nitesh	(Thailand) Mongkhon Bunsun (Thailand) Siripong Teamarrom	21–13, 21–7	(gold) Winner
2023	Spanish Para Badminton International	Level 2	(India) Kumar Nitesh	(India) Pramod Bhagat (India) Sukant Kadam	20–22, 21–12, 9–21	(silver) Runner-up
2023	Thailand Para Badminton International	Level 2	(India) Kumar Nitesh	(India) Pramod Bhagat (India) Sukant Kadam	21–18, 14–21, 19–21	(silver) Runner-up
2023	Bahrain Para Badminton International	Level 2	(India) Kumar Nitesh	(India) Pramod Bhagat (India) Sukant Kadam	24–22, 9–21, 14–21	(silver) Runner-up
2023	Canada Para Badminton International	Level 1	(India) Kumar Nitesh	(India) Nilesh Gaikwad (India) Nehal Gupta	21–12, 21–8	(gold) Winner
2023	Canada Para Badminton International	Level 1	(India) Kumar Nitesh	(France) Guillaume Gailly (Canada) William Roussy	21–13, 21–12	(gold) Winner
2023	Canada Para Badminton International	Level 1	(India) Kumar Nitesh	(India) Deep Ranjan Bisoyee (India) Manoj Sarkar	21–9, 17–21, 21–16	(gold) Winner
2023	Canada Para Badminton International	Level 1	(India) Kumar Nitesh	(India) Pramod Bhagat (India) Sukant Kadam	11–21, 21–16, 21–16	(gold) Winner

=== International tournaments (from 2011–2021) (2 titles, 3 runners-up) ===
Men's singles SL4

Year	Tournament	Opponent	Score	Result
2019	Dubai Para Badminton International	(France) Lucas Mazur	13–21, 17–21	(silver) Runner-up
2019	Uganda Para Badminton International	(India) Sukant Kadam	21–12, 22–20	(gold) Winner
2019	Canada Para Badminton International	(France) Lucas Mazur	21–18, 19–21, 21–17	(gold) Winner

Men's doubles SL3–SL4

Year	Tournament	Partner	Opponent	Score	Result
2019	Turkish Para Badminton International	(India) Kumar Nitesh	(Indonesia) Dwiyoko (Indonesia) Fredy Setiawan	14–21, 15–21	(silver) Runner-up
2019	Irish Para Badminton International	(India) Kumar Nitesh	(India) Pramod Bhagat (India) Manoj Sarkar	21–13, 18–21, 21–23	(silver) Runner-up
