= Suhas Lalinakere Yathiraj =

Indian para-badminton player (born 1983)

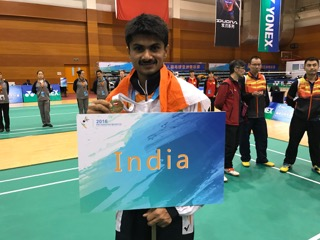

Personal information
- Born: 2 July 1983 (age 43) Hassan, Karnataka, India
- Years active: 2007–present
- Height: 1.75 m (5 ft 9 in)
- Weight: 61 kg (134 lb)

Sport
- Country: India
- Sport: Badminton
- Handedness: Right
- Coached by: Gaurav Khanna

Men's singles SL4 Men's doubles SL3–SL4
- Highest ranking: 1 (MS 23 June 2024); 7 (MD with Umesh Vikram Kumar 24 October 2019)
- Current ranking: 120 (MS); 104 (MD with Umesh Vikram Kumar) (21 October 2026)
- BWF profile
Medal record
Men's para-badminton
Representing India
Paralympic Games
Silver medal – second place	2020 Tokyo	Men's singles
Silver medal – second place	2024 Paris	Men's singles
World Championships
Gold medal – first place	2024 Pattaya	Men's singles
Asian Para Games
Gold medal – first place	2022 Hangzhou	Men's singles
Bronze medal – third place	2018 Jakarta	Men's team
Bronze medal – third place	2026 Aichi-Nagoya	Men's singles
Asian Championships
Gold medal – first place	2016 Beijing	Men's singles

Suhas Lalinakere Yathiraj (born 2 July 1983) is an Indian para-badminton player and IAS officer who is currently ranked World No. 1 in men's singles and has won the silver medal at the Tokyo 2020 and Paris 2024 games thus becoming the only Indian para-badminton player to win back to back medals at the Games.

Yathiraj is also an IAS officer of the 2007 batch of Uttar Pradesh cadre, and has served as District Magistrate of Gautam Buddha Nagar & Prayagraj. He won the gold medal at the National Para Badminton Championships in 2018. He is also an engineer who graduated from National Institute of Technology, Surathkal. He is the only IAS officer in India to win a Paralympic medal and an Arjuna Award.

At the 2016 Asian Para Badminton Championships, Beijing, China, he became the first Indian bureaucrat to win a professional International Badminton Championship. He won gold beating Hary Susanto of Indonesia in the finals when he was serving as District Magistrate of Azamgarh. He came to International attention when he won gold and became first ever serving Indian bureaucrat to represent and win a medal for India at global level.

In December 2016, he became the recipient of Uttar Pradesh's highest civilian honor, the Yash Bharti, which he received on 1 December 2016 from the erstwhile Chief Minister of Uttar Pradesh, Akhilesh Yadav. On 3 December, World Disabilities Day, he received award from the state government for his performances in para sports. He also holds distinctive record for winning many awards while serving in his official capacity. He has been awarded for his performances by Governor of Uttar Pradesh for his duties related to elections, by Revenue Minister and Chairman, Board of Revenue for duties regarding revenue administration. Suhas is also supported by GoSports Foundation through the Para Champions Programme.

Since his appointment in February 2023, he is serving as the Secretary and Director General of Youth Welfare and Prantiya Rakshak Dal, a department of the Government of Uttar Pradesh.

== Early life and education ==
Suhas Lalinakere Yathiraj was born to Yathiraj L K(late) and Jayashree C S in Hassan, Karnataka. Sibling : Sharath L Y, His early schooling happened in Dudda near Hassan district. Since his father was a government servant, he had to travel and move with father during his postings at different places. He did most of his secondary education in DVS independent college Shivamogga, Karnataka. He graduated from National Institute of Technology, Surathkal, Karnataka in Computer Science and Engineering branch in 2004 by scoring First class with Distinction.

== Posts held ==
Position	Place	Tenure
Probationer	Agra	1 year
Joint Magistrate	Azamgarh	1 year 3 months
Chief Development Officer	Mathura	4 months
District Magistrate	Maharajganj	3 months
District Magistrate	Hathras	10 months
District Magistrate	Sonbhadra	3 months
District Magistrate	Jaunpur	2 years 3 months
District Magistrate	Azamgarh	1 year 11 months
District Magistrate	Prayagraj	1 year 4 months
District Magistrate	Gautam Buddha Nagar	Incumbent

== Personal life ==
Suhas is married to Ritu Suhas, who got selected as Mrs U.P in Mrs. India 2019 contest a PCS officer currently posted as ADM (Administration) in Ghaziabad. His daughter Saanvi is 13 years old and son Vivaan is 9 years old. His wife has also been awarded for excellent work in voter awareness in general elections.

== Achievements ==
=== Paralympic Games ===
Men's singles SL4

Year	Venue	Opponent	Score	Result
2020	Yoyogi National Gymnasium, Tokyo, Japan	(France) Lucas Mazur	21–15, 17–21, 15–21	Silver
2024	Porte de La Chapelle Arena, Paris, France	(France) Lucas Mazur	9–21, 13–21	Silver

=== World Championships ===
Men's singles SL4

Year	Venue	Opponent	Score	Result
2024	Pattaya Exhibition and Convention Hall, Pattaya, Thailand	(Indonesia) Fredy Setiawan	21–18, 21–18	Gold

=== Asian Para Games ===
Men's singles SL4

Year	Venue	Opponent	Score	Result
2022	Binjiang Gymnasium, Guangzhou, China	(Malaysia) Mohd Amin Burhanuddin	13–21, 21–18, 21–9	Gold

=== Asian Championships ===
Men's singles SL4

Year	Venue	Opponent	Score	Result
2016	China Administration of Sport for Persons with Disabilities, Beijing, China	(Indonesia) Hary Susanto	21–4, 21–11	Gold

=== BWF Para Badminton World Circuit (1 title, 4 runners-up) ===
The BWF Para Badminton World Circuit – Grade 2, Level 1, 2 and 3 tournaments has been sanctioned by the Badminton World Federation from 2022.

Men's singles SL4

Year	Tournament	Level	Opponent	Score	Result
2023	Thailand Para-Badminton International	Level 2	(India) Sukant Kadam	21–14, 17–21, 21–11	(gold) Winner
2023	Bahrain Para-Badminton International	Level 2	(Malaysia) Mohd Amin Burhanuddin	21–16, 21–23, 17–21	(silver) Runner-up
2023	Dubai Para-Badminton International	Level 1	(Malaysia) Mohd Amin Burhanuddin	13–21, 16–21	(silver) Runner-up
2024	Spanish Para-Badminton International I	Level 1	(France) Lucas Mazur	18–21, 6–21	(silver) Runner-up
2024	4 Nations Para-Badminton International	Level 1	(France) Lucas Mazur	7–21, 11–21	(silver) Runner-up

=== International tournaments (2011–2021) (4 titles, 5 runners-up) ===
Men's singles SL4

Year	Tournament	Opponent	Score	Result
2017	Turkish Para-Badminton International	(India) Sukant Kadam	21–16, 21–10	(gold) Winner
2017	Japan Para-Badminton International	(France) Lucas Mazur	14–21, 21–14, 15–21	(silver) Runner-up
2018	Turkish Para-Badminton International	(France) Lucas Mazur	10–21, 19–21	(silver) Runner-up
2019	Turkish Para-Badminton International	(France) Lucas Mazur	21–16, 22–20	(gold) Winner
2019	Irish Para-Badminton International	(France) Lucas Mazur	19–21, 17–21	(silver) Runner-up
2020	Brazil Para-Badminton International	(France) Lucas Mazur	9–21, 21–16, 21–19	(gold) Winner
2020	Peru Para-Badminton International	(India) Sukant Kadam	21–19, 21–16	(gold) Winner

Men's doubles SL3–SL4

Year	Tournament	Partner	Opponent	Score	Result
2019	China Para-Badminton International	(India) Umesh Vikram Kumar	(India) Pramod Bhagat (India) Manoj Sarkar	21–18, 16–21, 15–21	(silver) Runner-up
2019	Denmark Para-Badminton International	(India) Umesh Vikram Kumar	(Thailand) Mongkhon Bunsun (Thailand) Siripong Teamarrom	21–14, 8–21, 12–21	(silver) Runner-up

== Awards and recognition ==
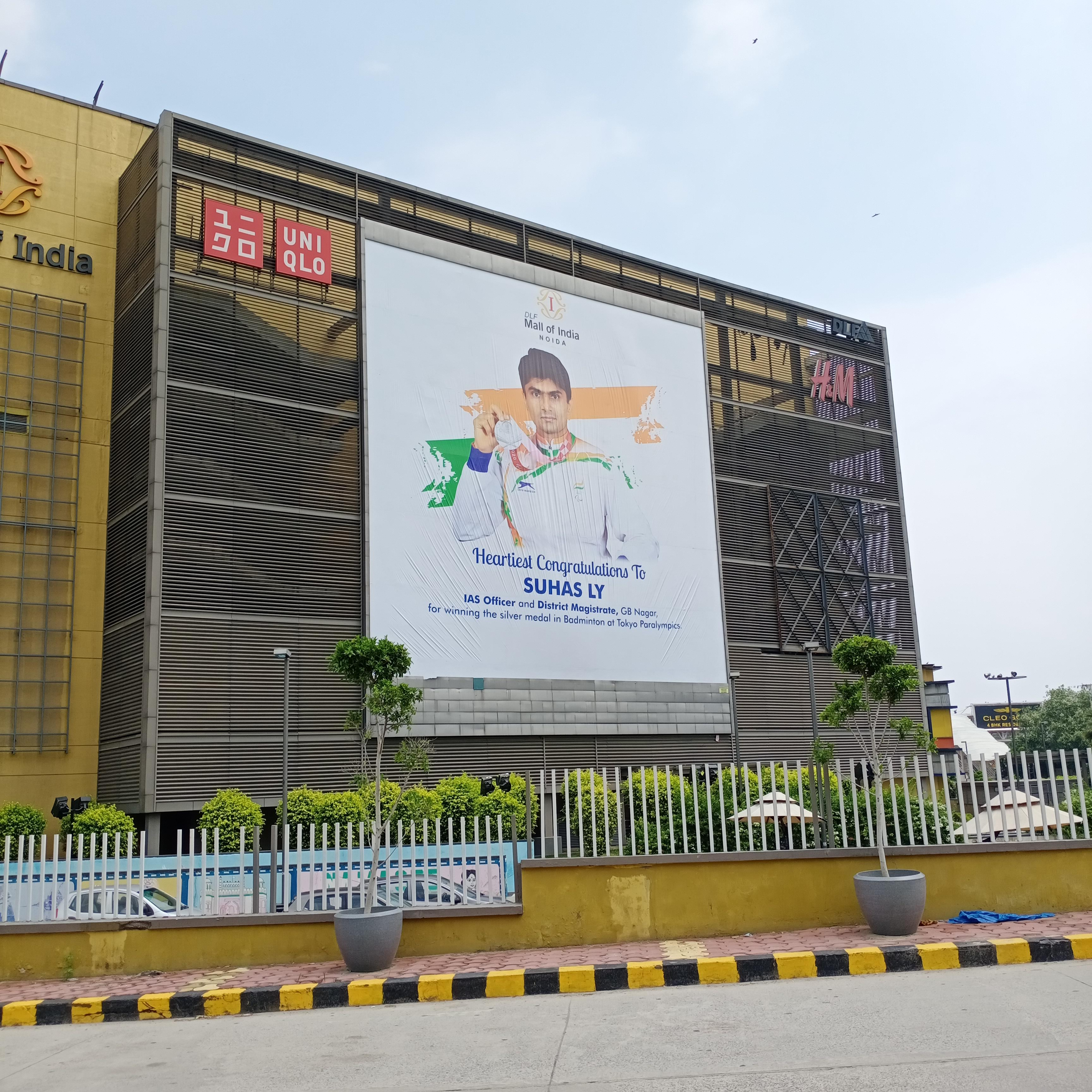
A huge hoarding in Noida congratulating Suhas

=== In sports ===
- Awarded Arjuna Award (2nd Highest Sport Award after Khel Ratna) (2021)
- Yash Bharti, highest civilian honour of UP. (2016)
- Best Para Sportsperson, by State government of Uttar Pradesh on World Disability Day on 3 December 2016 in Lucknow
- Memento felicitation by president BAI (Badminton Association of India) during PBL (Premier Badminton League) in Lucknow on 6 January 2017
- On the occasion of National Sports Day, 2017 (August, 29th, 2017), he was given special award by Hon'ble Chief Minister, UP for winning International Medals for the Country and also received cash prize of 10 Lac rupees and appreciation certificate.

=== In administration ===
- In 2016, he received Yash Bharti, UP's highest civilian award.
- Shortlisted for Prime Minister's award for excellent performance in Pradhan Mantri Jan Dhan Award
- Developed Mobile Application for Kuposhan ka Darpan and Pregnancy ka Darpan, to help undernourished children and pregnant mothers
- Developed Mobile Application for helping differently abled voters during general elections
- Awarded by Revenue minister, Government of UP and Chairman Board of Revenue for excellent work in administration
- Awarded by Hon’ble Governor UP for good performance in election related work
- During his tenure as the District Magistrate, Azamgarh, he also got shortlisted for Prime Minister's award for exemplary work in PM Jan Dhan Yojna on civil services day, 2016
