= Siripong Teamarrom =

Thai para-badminton player

Personal information
- Born: 7 September 1988 (age 37) Ratchaburi, Thailand

Sport
- Country: Thailand
- Sport: Badminton

Men's singles SL4 Men's doubles SL3–SL4 Mixed doubles SL3–SU5
- Highest ranking: 6 (MS 7 January 2020); 5 (MD with Mongkhon Bunsun 31 May 2022); 2 (XD with Nipada Saensupa 2 April 2019)
- Current ranking: 20 (MS); 14 (MD with Mongkhon Bunsun); 10 (XD with Nipada Saensupa) (17 September 2024)
Medal record
Men's para-badminton
Representing Thailand
World Championships
Silver medal – second place	2022 Tokyo	Mixed doubles
Silver medal – second place	2024 Pattaya	Men's doubles
Bronze medal – third place	2017 Ulsan	Men's doubles
Bronze medal – third place	2019 Basel	Mixed doubles
Asian Para Games
Silver medal – second place	2018 Jakarta	Mixed doubles
Bronze medal – third place	2018 Jakarta	Men's team
ASEAN Para Games
Silver medal – second place	2022 Surakarta	Mixed doubles
Silver medal – second place	2022 Surakarta	Men's team
Bronze medal – third place	2017 Kuala Lumpur	Men's doubles
Bronze medal – third place	2017 Kuala Lumpur	Mixed doubles
Bronze medal – third place	2022 Surakarta	Men's doubles
Bronze medal – third place	2023 Cambodia	Men doubles
Bronze medal – third place	2023 Cambodia	Mixed doubles
Bronze medal – third place	2023 Cambodia	Men's team

Siripong Teamarrom (Thai: ศิริพงษ์ เติมอารมณ์; born 7 September 1988) is a Thai para-badminton player. In 2021, he represented Thailand in the men's singles SL4 event and the mixed doubles SL3–SU5 event at the 2020 Summer Paralympics.

He and his partner, Nipada Saensupa reached the semi-finals in the mixed doubles SL3–SU5 event at the 2024 Summer Paralympics but lost in the bronze medal match to the host pair of Lucas Mazur and Faustine Noël.

== Achievements ==
=== World Championships ===
Men's doubles SL3–SL4

Year	Venue	Partner	Opponent	Score	Result
2017	Dongchun Gymnasium, Ulsan, South Korea	(France) Mathieu Thomas	(Indonesia) Ukun Rukaendi (Indonesia) Hary Susanto	9–21, 17–21	Bronze
2024	Pattaya Exhibition and Convention Hall, Pattaya, Thailand	(Thailand) Mongkhon Bunsun	(Indonesia) Dwiyoko (Indonesia) Fredy Setiawan	17–21, 14–21	Silver

Mixed doubles SL3–SU5

Year	Venue	Partner	Opponent	Score	Result
2019	St. Jakobshalle, Basel, Switzerland	(Thailand) Nipada Saensupa	(Indonesia) Hary Susanto (Indonesia) Leani Ratri Oktila	9–21, 14–21	Bronze
2022	Yoyogi National Gymnasium, Pattaya, Thailand	(Thailand) Nipada Saensupa	(Indonesia) Fredy Setiawan (Indonesia) Khalimatus Sadiyah	15–21, 12–21	Silver

=== Asian Para Games ===
Mixed doubles SL3–SU5

Year	Venue	Partner	Opponent	Score	Result
2018	Istora Gelora Bung Karno, Jakarta, Indonesia	(Thailand) Nipada Saensupa	(Indonesia) Hary Susanto (Indonesia) Leani Ratri Oktila	7–21, 10–21	Silver

=== ASEAN Para Games ===
Men's doubles SL3–SL4

Year	Venue	Partner	Opponent	Score	Result
2017	Axiata Arena, Kuala Lumpur, Malaysia	(Thailand) Subpong Meepian	(Indonesia) Dwiyoko (Indonesia) Fredy Setiawan	12–21, 9–21	Bronze
2022	Edutorium Muhammadiyah University of Surakarta, Surakarta, Indonesia	(Thailand) Mongkhon Bunsun	(Indonesia) Dwiyoko (Indonesia) Fredy Setiawan	15–21, 19–21	Bronze
2023	Morodok Techo Badminton Hall, Phnom Penh, Cambodia	(Thailand) Singha Sangnil	(Indonesia) Ukun Rukaendi (Indonesia) Hary Susanto	15–21, 19–21	Bronze

Mixed doubles SL3–SU5

Year	Venue	Partner	Opponent	Score	Result
2017	Axiata Arena, Kuala Lumpur, Malaysia	(Thailand) Nipada Saensupa	(Indonesia) Hary Susanto (Indonesia) Leani Ratri Oktila	11–21, 12–21	Bronze
2022 (Note: This tournament uses a round robin system.)	Edutorium Muhammadiyah University of Surakarta, Surakarta, Indonesia	(Thailand) Nipada Saensupa	(Thailand) Pricha Somsiri (Thailand) Darunee Henpraiwan	Walkover	Silver
2022	Edutorium Muhammadiyah University of Surakarta, Surakarta, Indonesia	(Thailand) Nipada Saensupa	(Indonesia) Fredy Setiawan (Indonesia) Khalimatus Sadiyah	11–21, 24–26	Silver
2022	Edutorium Muhammadiyah University of Surakarta, Surakarta, Indonesia	(Thailand) Nipada Saensupa	(Indonesia) Khoirur Roziqin (Indonesia) Warining Rahayu	21–16, 21–13	Silver
2023	Morodok Techo Badminton Hall, Phnom Penh, Cambodia	(Thailand) Nipada Saensupa	(Indonesia) Fredy Setiawan (Indonesia) Khalimatus Sadiyah	14–21, 16–21	Bronze

=== BWF Para Badminton World Circuit (2 runners-up) ===
The BWF Para Badminton World Circuit – Grade 2, Level 1, 2 and 3 tournaments has been sanctioned by the Badminton World Federation from 2022.

Men's doubles SL3–SL4

Year	Tournament	Level	Partner	Opponent	Score	Result
2022	Bahrain Para-Badminton International	Level 2	(Thailand) Mongkhon Bunsun	(India) Kumar Nitesh (India) Tarun Dhillon	13–21, 7–21	(silver) Runner-up

Mixed doubles SL3–SU5

Year	Tournament	Level	Partner	Opponent	Score	Result
2022	Bahrain Para-Badminton International	Level 2	(Thailand) Nipada Saensupa	(India) Pramod Bhagat (India) Manisha Ramadass	14–21, 11–21	(silver) Runner-up

=== International tournaments (2011–2021) (10 titles, 5 runners-up) ===
Men's singles SL4

Year	Tournament	Opponent	Score	Result
2017	Irish Para-Badminton International	(France) Lucas Mazur	19–21, 17–21	(silver) Runner-up
2019	Japan Para-Badminton International	(France) Lucas Mazur	9–21, 8–21	(silver) Runner-up

Men's doubles SL3–SL4

Year	Tournament	Partner	Opponent	Score	Result
2018	Spanish Para-Badminton International	(France) Mathieu Thomas	(Germany) Jan-Niklas Pott (Germany) Pascal Wolter	17–21, 21–14, 22–20	(gold) Winner
2018	Turkish Para-Badminton International	(Japan) Daisuke Fujihara	(France) Guillaume Gailly (France) Mathieu Thomas	21–11, 16–21, 22–20	(gold) Winner
2018	Japan Para-Badminton International	(Japan) Daisuke Fujihara	(Germany) Jan-Niklas Pott (Germany) Pascal Wolter	21–14, 18–21, 21–10	(gold) Winner
2019	Thailand Para-Badminton International	(Thailand) Mongkhon Bunsun	(India) Pramod Bhagat (India) Manoj Sarkar	21–16, 8–21, 21–14	(gold) Winner
2019	Denmark Para-Badminton International	(Thailand) Mongkhon Bunsun	(India) Umesh Vikram Kumar (India) Suhas Lalinakere Yathiraj	14–21, 21–8, 21–12	(gold) Winner

Mixed doubles SL3–SL4

Year	Tournament	Partner	Opponent	Score	Result
2017	Irish Para-Badminton International	(Thailand) Nipada Saensupa	(Germany) Marcel Adam (Germany) Katrin Seibert	21–19, 21–12	(gold) Winner
2018	Spanish Para-Badminton International	(Thailand) Nipada Saensupa	(Germany) Marcel Adam (Germany) Katrin Seibert	21–16, 21–11	(gold) Winner
2018	Turkish Para-Badminton International	(Thailand) Nipada Saensupa	(Japan) Toshiaki Suenaga (Japan) Akiko Sugino	21–12, 21–18	(gold) Winner
2018	Japan Para-Badminton International	(Thailand) Chanida Srinavakul	(Japan) Toshiaki Suenaga (Japan) Akiko Sugino	15–21, 18–21	(silver) Runner-up
2019	Thailand Para-Badminton International	(Thailand) Nipada Saensupa	(France) Lucas Mazur (France) Faustine Noël	21–18, 21–19	(gold) Winner
2019	China Para-Badminton International	(Thailand) Nipada Saensupa	(Indonesia) Fredy Setiawan (Indonesia) Khalimatus Sadiyah	21–18, 16–21, 9–21	(silver) Runner-up
2019	Denmark Para-Badminton International	(Thailand) Nipada Saensupa	(France) Lucas Mazur (France) Faustine Noël	21–18, 12–21, 18–21	(silver) Runner-up
2020	Peru Para-Badminton International	(Thailand) Nipada Saensupa	(France) Lucas Mazur (France) Faustine Noël	21–17, 23–25, 21–15	(gold) Winner
