= Badminton at the 2026 Asian Para Games – Mixed doubles SL3–SU5 =

Mixed Doubles SL3–SU5 event at the 2026 Asian Para Games
- Venue: Ichinomiya City Municipal Gymnasium, Ichinomiya
- Dates: 16 – 23 October 2026
- Competitors: 22 from 5 nations

Medalists
| gold medal | Hikmat Ramdani; Leani Ratri Oktila | Indonesia |
| silver medal | Nitesh Kumar; Thulasimathi Murugesan | India |
| bronze medal | Pramod Bhagat; Manisha Ramadass | India |
| bronze medal | Li Mingpan; Xiao Zuxian | China |

The mixed doubles SL3–SU5 event at the 2026 Asian Para Games was played from 16 to 23 October 2026 in Ichinomiya City Municipal Gymnasium, Ichinomiya. A total of 22 players competed in 11 pairs.

Hikmat Ramdani and Leani Ratri Oktila successfully defended their title, defeating Nitesh Kumar and Thulasimathi Murugesan in the final. Pramod Bhagat and Manisha Ramadass, alongside Li Mingpan and Xiao Zuxian shared the bronze medals each.

== Schedule ==
| GS | Group stage | ¼ | Quarterfinals | ½ | Semifinals | F | Final |

| Fri 16 | Sat 17 | Sun 18 | Mon 19 | Tue 20 | Wed 21 | Thu 22 | Fri 23 |
|---|---|---|---|---|---|---|---|
| GS | GS | —N/a | GS | ¼ | —N/a | ½ | F |

== Seeds ==
The following players were seeded:

1. Hikmat Ramdani / Leani Ratri Oktila (INA) (gold medallist)
2. Nitesh Kumar / Thulasimathi Murugesan (IND) (silver medallist)
3. Fredy Setiawan / Khalimatus Sadiyah (INA) (quarter-finals)

== Group Stage ==
=== Group A ===
| Pos | Team | Pld | W | L | GF | GA | GD | PF | PA | PD | Qualification |
|---|---|---|---|---|---|---|---|---|---|---|---|
| 1 | Hikmat Ramdani (INA) Leani Ratri Oktila (INA) [1] | 2 | 2 | 0 | 4 | 0 | +4 | 84 | 53 | +31 | Semi-finals |
| 2 | Pramod Bhagat (IND) Manisha Ramadass (IND) | 2 | 1 | 1 | 2 | 3 | −1 | 96 | 95 | +1 | Quarter-finals |
| 3 | Xiong Lichuan (CHN) Li Tongtong (CHN) | 2 | 0 | 2 | 1 | 4 | −3 | 71 | 103 | −32 | |

Source: Asian Para Games

| Date | Player 1 | Score | Player 2 | Game 1 | Game 2 | Game 3 | Report |
|---|---|---|---|---|---|---|---|
| 16 Oct | Pramod Bhagat (India); Manisha Ramadass (India) | 2–1 | (China) Xiong Lichuan (China) Li Tongtong | 21–16 | 19–21 | 21–16 | Report |
| 17 Oct | Hikmat Ramdani (Indonesia); Leani Ratri Oktila (Indonesia) | 2–0 | (India) Pramod Bhagat (India) Manisha Ramadass | 21–19 | 21–16 | | Report |
| 19 Oct | Hikmat Ramdani (Indonesia); Leani Ratri Oktila (Indonesia) | 2–0 | (China) Xiong Lichuan (China) Li Tongtong | 21–7 | 21–11 | | Report |

=== Group B ===
| Pos | Team | Pld | W | L | GF | GA | GD | PF | PA | PD | Qualification |
|---|---|---|---|---|---|---|---|---|---|---|---|
| 1 | Nitesh Kumar (IND) Thulasimathi Murugesan (IND) [2] | 2 | 2 | 0 | 4 | 0 | +4 | 84 | 38 | +46 | Semi-finals |
| 2 | Siripong Teamarrom (THA) Chanida Srinavakul (THA) | 2 | 1 | 1 | 2 | 3 | −1 | 76 | 95 | −19 | Quarter-finals |
| 3 | Chen Pengfei (CHN) Huang Zixuan (CHN) | 2 | 0 | 2 | 1 | 4 | −3 | 75 | 102 | −27 | |
| 4 | Yang Jianyuan (CHN) Yang Qiuxia (CHN) | 0 | 0 | 0 | 0 | 0 | 0 | 0 | 0 | 0 | Withdrew |

Source: Asian Para Games

| Date | Player 1 | Score | Player 2 | Game 1 | Game 2 | Game 3 | Report |
|---|---|---|---|---|---|---|---|
| 16 Oct | Nitesh Kumar (India); Thulasimathi Murugesan (India) | 2–0 | (Thailand) Siripong Teamarrom (Thailand) Chanida Srinavakul | 21–9 | 21–7 | | Report |
| 16 Oct | Yang Jianyuan (China); Yang Qiuxia (China) | RET | (China) Chen Pengfei (China) Huang Zixuan | 13–21 | 10–11 | | Report |
| 17 Oct | Chen Pengfei (China); Huang Zixuan (China) | 1–2 | (Thailand) Siripong Teamarrom (Thailand) Chanida Srinavakul | 13–21 | 21–18 | 19–21 | Report |
| 19 Oct | Nitesh Kumar (India); Thulasimathi Murugesan (India) | 2–0 | (China) Chen Pengfei (China) Huang Zixuan | 21–4 | 21–18 | | Report |

=== Group C ===
| Pos | Team | Pld | W | L | GF | GA | GD | PF | PA | PD | Qualification |
|---|---|---|---|---|---|---|---|---|---|---|---|
| 1 | Li Mingpan (CHN) Xiao Zuxian (CHN) | 3 | 3 | 0 | 6 | 1 | +5 | 143 | 99 | +44 | Quarter-finals |
| 2 | Fredy Setiawan (INA) Khalimatus Sadiyah (INA) [3] | 3 | 2 | 1 | 5 | 2 | +3 | 138 | 92 | +46 | Quarter-finals |
| 3 | Ruthick Ragupathi (IND) Manasi Joshi (IND) | 3 | 1 | 2 | 2 | 4 | −2 | 88 | 104 | −16 | |
| 4 | Khian Kyle Urbano (PHI) Kathleen Pedrosa (PHI) | 3 | 0 | 3 | 0 | 6 | −6 | 52 | 126 | −74 | |

Source: Asian Para Games

| Date | Player 1 | Score | Player 2 | Game 1 | Game 2 | Game 3 | Report |
|---|---|---|---|---|---|---|---|
| 16 Oct | Fredy Setiawan (Indonesia); Khalimatus Sadiyah (Indonesia) | 2–0 | (India) Manasi Joshi (India) Ruthick Ragupathi | 21–15 | 21–4 | | Report |
| 16 Oct | Khian Kyle Urbano (Philippines); Kathleen Pedrosa (Philippines) | 0–2 | (China) Li Mingpan (China) Xiao Zuxian | 13–21 | 5–21 | | Report |
| 17 Oct | Fredy Setiawan (Indonesia); Khalimatus Sadiyah (Indonesia) | 2–0 | (Philippines) Khian Kyle Urbano (Philippines) Kathleen Pedrosa | 21–9 | 21–5 | | Report |
| 17 Oct | Li Mingpan (China); Xiao Zuxian (China) | 2–0 | (India) Manasi Joshi (India) Ruthick Ragupathi | 21–10 | 21–17 | | Report |
| 19 Oct | Fredy Setiawan (Indonesia); Khalimatus Sadiyah (Indonesia) | 1–2 | (China) Li Mingpan (China) Xiao Zuxian | 14–21 | 21–17 | 19–21 | Report |
| 19 Oct | Khian Kyle Urbano (Philippines); Kathleen Pedrosa (Philippines) | 0–2 | (India) Manasi Joshi (India) Ruthick Ragupathi | 5–21 | 15–21 | | Report |

== Knockout stage ==
Quarter-finals
Pramod Bhagat (IND); Manisha Ramadass (IND) | 21 | 21
Siripong Teamarrom (THA); Chainada Srinavakul (THA) | 15 | 14
3 | Fredy Setiawan (INA); Khalimatus Sadiyah (INA) | 14 | 22 | 15
Li Mingpan (CHN); Xiao Zuxian (CHN) | 21 | 20 | 21

Semi-finals
1 | Hikmat Ramdani (INA); Leani Ratri Oktila (INA) | 16 | 21 | 21
Pramod Bhagat (IND); Manisha Ramadass (IND) | 21 | 14 | 17
Li Mingpan (CHN); Xiao Zuxian (CHN) | 19 | 21 | 17
2 | Nitesh Kumar (IND); Thulasimathi Murugesan (IND) | 21 | 14 | 21

Final
1 | Hikmat Ramdani (INA); Leani Ratri Oktila (INA) | 11 | 21 | 21
2 | Nitesh Kumar (IND); Thulasimathi Murugesan (IND) | 21 | 19 | 14
