= BWF Awards =

Badminton awards

- Sport: Badminton
- Awarded for: Excellence in Badminton
- Sponsored by: Badminton World Federation

History
- First award: 1998
- Editions: 26
- First winner: (Denmark) Peter Gade
- Most wins: (Malaysia) Lee Chong Wei (China) Huang Yaqiong (Indonesia) Leani Ratri Oktila
- Most recent: (China) Shi Yuqi (South Korea) An Se-young

BWF Awards are awards given by the Badminton World Federation to the top badminton players during a given season.

== Players of the Year ==
From 1998 to 2007, this award was named Eddy Choong Player of the Year.

Year	Male Player	Female Player	Ref
1998	(Denmark) Peter Gade	—N/a	
1999	—N/a	(Denmark) Camilla Martin	
2000	(Indonesia) Candra Wijaya	—N/a	
2001	—N/a	(China) Gao Ling	
2002	(South Korea) Kim Dong-moon	—N/a	
2003	(South Korea) Kim Dong-moon	(South Korea) Ra Kyung-min	
2004	(Indonesia) Taufik Hidayat	—N/a	
2005	(Indonesia) Taufik Hidayat	—N/a	
2006	(China) Lin Dan	—N/a	
2007	(China) Lin Dan	—N/a	
2008	(China) Lin Dan	(Hong Kong) Zhou Mi	
2009	(Malaysia) Lee Chong Wei	(China) Wang Yihan	
2010	(Malaysia) Lee Chong Wei	(China) Wang Xin	
2011	(Malaysia) Lee Chong Wei	(China) Wang Xiaoli; Yu Yang	
2012	(China) Cai Yun; Fu Haifeng	(China) Wang Yihan	
2013	(Malaysia) Lee Chong Wei	(China) Li Xuerui	
2014	(China) Chen Long	(China) Zhao Yunlei	
2015	(China) Chen Long	(Spain) Carolina Marín	
2016	(Malaysia) Lee Chong Wei	(Japan) Misaki Matsutomo; Ayaka Takahashi	
2017	(Indonesia) Marcus Gideon; Kevin Sukamuljo	(China) Chen Qingchen	
2018	(Indonesia) Marcus Gideon; Kevin Sukamuljo	(China) Huang Yaqiong	
2019	(Japan) Kento Momota	(China) Huang Yaqiong	
2020–2021	(Denmark) Viktor Axelsen	(Chinese Taipei) Tai Tzu-ying	
2022	(Denmark) Viktor Axelsen	(Japan) Akane Yamaguchi	
2023	(South Korea) Seo Seung-jae	(South Korea) An Se-young	
2024	(China) Shi Yuqi	(South Korea) An Se-young	
2025	(China) Shi Yuqi	(South Korea) An Se-young	

== Pairs of the Year ==
Year	Men's Doubles	Women's Doubles	Mixed Doubles	Ref
2020–2021	—N/a	(Indonesia) Greysia Polii; Apriyani Rahayu	—N/a	
2022	—N/a	—N/a	(China) Zheng Siwei; Huang Yaqiong	
2023	—N/a	(China) Chen Qingchen; Jia Yifan	—N/a	
2024	(China) Liang Weikeng; Wang Chang	(China) Liu Shengshu; Tan Ning	(China) Feng Yanzhe; Huang Dongping	
2025	(South Korea) Kim Won-ho; Seo Seung-jae	(China) Liu Shengshu; Tan Ning	(Thailand) Dechapol Puavaranukroh; Supissara Paewsampran	

== Players' Player of the Year ==
Year	Male Player	Female Player	Ref
2024	(Denmark) Viktor Axelsen	(South Korea) An Se-young	
2025	(China) Shi Yuqi	(South Korea) An Se-young	

== Rising Star of the Year ==
This was awarded from 2008 to 2023 as the Most Promising Player of the Year. In 2024, it was renamed Rising Star of the Year.

Year	Player	Ref
2008	(India) Saina Nehwal	
2009	(Thailand) Ratchanok Intanon	
2010	(Denmark) Viktor Axelsen	
2011	(Malaysia) Zulfadli Zulkiffli	
2012	(Japan) Kento Momota	
2013	(Japan) Akane Yamaguchi	
2014	(Japan) Akane Yamaguchi	
2015	(China) Zheng Siwei	
2016	(China) Chen Qingchen	
2017	(China) Chen Yufei	
2018	(China) Han Chengkai; Zhou Haodong	
2019	(South Korea) An Se-young	
2020–2021	(Thailand) Kunlavut Vitidsarn	
2022	(Japan) Kodai Naraoka	
2023	(China) Liu Shengshu; Tan Ning	
2024	(France) Alex Lanier	
2025	(Canada) Victor Lai	

== Para-players of the Year ==
This award was first presented in 2015.

Year	Male Player	Female Player	Ref
2015	(South Korea) Lee Sam-seop	(Norway) Helle Sofie Sagøy	
2016	(France) Lucas Mazur	(Switzerland) Karin Suter-Erath	
2017	(South Korea) Kim Jung-jun	(Thailand) Amnouy Wetwithan	
2018	(England) Jack Shephard	(Indonesia) Leani Ratri Oktila	
2019	(China) Qu Zimo	(Indonesia) Leani Ratri Oktila	
2020–2021	(China) Qu Zimo	(Indonesia) Leani Ratri Oktila	
2022	(Japan) Daiki Kajiwara	(India) Manisha Ramadass	
2023	(Japan) Daiki Kajiwara	(Indonesia) Rina Marlina	
2024	(China) Qu Zimo	(China) Liu Yutong (China) Li Fengmei	
2025	(Malaysia) Cheah Liek Hou	(Switzerland) Ilaria Olgiati	

== Para-pair of the Year ==
Year	Pair	Ref
2020–2021	(France) Lucas Mazur; Faustine Noël	
2022	(Germany) Thomas Wandschneider; Rick Hellmann	
2023	(Indonesia) Hikmat Ramdani; Leani Ratri Oktila	
2024	(Indonesia) Hikmat Ramdani; Leani Ratri Oktila	
2025	(Malaysia) Cheah Liek Hou; Muhammad Fareez Anuar	

== Best-dressed of the Year ==
This award is given to the best-dressed player at the Gala held prior to the season-ending BWF World Tour Finals and its predecessor, the BWF Super Series Finals.

Year	Male Player	Female Player	Ref
2013	(South Korea) Ko Sung-hyun	(Chinese Taipei) Tai Tzu-ying	
2015	(Chinese Taipei) Chou Tien-chen	(Thailand) Ratchanok Intanon	
2016	(Denmark) Viktor Axelsen	(Malaysia) Woon Khe Wei	
2017	(India) Srikanth Kidambi	(Chinese Taipei) Tai Tzu-ying	
2018	(China) Shi Yuqi	(India) P. V. Sindhu	
2019	(Denmark) Viktor Axelsen	(Thailand) Ratchanok Intanon	
2022	(India) Prannoy H. S.	(Thailand) Busanan Ongbamrungphan	
2023	(Malaysia) Chen Tang Jie	(Thailand) Jongkolphan Kititharakul	
2024	(China) He Jiting	(India) Gayatri Gopichand	
2025	(India) Satwiksairaj Rankireddy	(Indonesia) Putri Kusuma Wardani	

== Defunct category ==
In 2024, BWF announced a brand-new structure for the awards. This led to a category becoming defunct.

=== Most Improved Player of the Year ===
Year	Player(s)	Ref
2016	(India) P. V. Sindhu	
2017	(Japan) Yuki Fukushima; Sayaka Hirota	
2018	(Japan) Mayu Matsumoto; Wakana Nagahara	
2019	(South Korea) Kim So-yeong; Kong Hee-yong	
2020–2021	(Chinese Taipei) Lee Yang; Wang Chi-lin	
2022	(Indonesia) Fajar Alfian; Muhammad Rian Ardianto	
2023	(China) Jiang Zhenbang; Wei Yaxin	
