= Badminton at the 2024 Summer Paralympics – Mixed doubles SL3–SU5 =

Badminton competition

Mixed doubles SL3–SU5 at the XVII Paralympic Games
- Venue: Arena Porte de La Chapelle, Paris
- Dates: 29 August 2024 – 2 September 2024
- Competitors: 16 from 8 nations

Medalists
1st place, gold medalist(s)		Hikmat Ramdani; Leani Ratri Oktila	Indonesia
2nd place, silver medalist(s)		Fredy Setiawan; Khalimatus Sadiyah	Indonesia
3rd place, bronze medalist(s)		Lucas Mazur; Faustine Noël	France

The mixed doubles SL3–SU5 tournament at the 2024 Summer Paralympics in France will take place between 29 August and 2 September 2024 at Arena Porte de La Chapelle.

== Classification ==
- SL3
  Players have impairment in one or both lower limbs and poor walking/running balance
- SL4
  Players have impairment in one or both lower limbs and minimal impairment in walking/running balance (better walking/running compared to SL3)
- SU5
  Players have impairment of the upper limbs.

== Seeds ==
These were the seeds for this event:

1. Hikmat Ramdani / Leani Ratri Oktila (INA) (champions, gold medalists)
2. Fredy Setiawan / Khalimatus Sadiyah (INA) (final, silver medalists)

== Group stage ==
The draw of the group stage revealed on 24 August 2024. The group stage will be played from 29 to 30 August. The top two winners of each group advanced to the knockout rounds.

=== Group A ===
Pos	Team	Pld	W	L	GF	GA	GD	PF	PA	PD	Pts	Qualification
1	Hikmat Ramdani (INA) [SL4] Leani Ratri Oktila (INA) [SL4]	3	3	0	6	0	+6	126	74	+52	3	Semi-finals
2	Lucas Mazur (FRA) [SL4] Faustine Noël (FRA) [SL4]	3	2	1	4	2	+2	110	107	+3	2	Semi-finals
3	Kumar Nitesh (IND) [SL3] Thulasimathi Murugesan (IND) [SU5]	3	1	2	2	4	−2	106	118	−12	1	
4	Suhas Lalinakere Yathiraj (IND) [SL4] Palak Kohli (IND) [SL4]	3	0	3	0	6	−6	83	126	−43	0	

First match(es) will be played: 29 August 2024. Source: COJOP2024

Date	Time	Player 1	Score	Player 2	Set 1	Set 2	Set 3	Report
Aug 29	8:30	Hikmat Ramdani (Indonesia); Leani Ratri Oktila (Indonesia)	2–0	(France) Lucas Mazur (France) Faustine Noël	21–11	21–12		Report
Aug 29	8:30	Kumar Nitesh (India); Thulasimathi Murugesan (India)	2–0	(India) Suhas Lalinakere Yathiraj (India) Palak Kohli	21–14	21–17		Report
Aug 29	18:40	Hikmat Ramdani (Indonesia); Leani Ratri Oktila (Indonesia)	2–0	(India) Kumar Nitesh (India) Thulasimathi Murugesan	21–15	21–8		Report
Aug 29	19:20	Lucas Mazur (France); Faustine Noël (France)	2–0	(India) Suhas Lalinakere Yathiraj (India) Palak Kohli	21–15	21–9		Report
Aug 30	20:40	Lucas Mazur (France); Faustine Noël (France)	2–0	(India) Kumar Nitesh (India) Thulasimathi Murugesan	24–22	21–19		Report
Aug 30	20:40	Hikmat Ramdani (Indonesia); Leani Ratri Oktila (Indonesia)	2–0	(India) Suhas Lalinakere Yathiraj (India) Palak Kohli	21–11	21–17		Report

=== Group B ===
Pos	Team	Pld	W	L	GF	GA	GD	PF	PA	PD	Pts	Qualification
1	Fredy Setiawan (INA) [SL4] Khalimatus Sadiyah (INA) [SL4]	3	3	0	6	0	+6	132	94	+38	3	Semi-finals
2	Siripong Teamarrom (THA) [SL4] Nipada Seansupa (THA) [SL4]	3	2	1	4	3	+1	124	126	−2	2	Semi-finals
3	Yang Jianyuan (CHN) [SL3] Yang Qiuxia (CHN) [SU5]	3	1	2	2	4	−2	105	120	−15	1	
4	Taiyo Imai (JPN) [SU5] Noriko Ito (JPN) [SL3]	3	0	3	1	6	−5	127	148	−21	0	

Updated to match(es) played on 29 August 2024. Source: COJOP2024

Date	Time	Player 1	Score	Player 2	Set 1	Set 2	Set 3	Report
Aug 29	8:30	Fredy Setiawan (Indonesia); Khalimatus Sadiyah (Indonesia)	2–0	(Japan) Taiyo Imai (Japan) Noriko Ito	21–12	25–23		Report
Aug 29	9:10	Siripong Teamarrom (Thailand); Nipada Seansupa (Thailand)	2–0	(China) Yang Jianyuan (China) Yang Qiuxia	21–11	21–15		Report
Aug 29	18:40	Taiyo Imai (Japan); Noriko Ito (Japan)	0–2	(China) Yang Jianyuan (China) Yang Qiuxia	19–21	15–21		Report
Aug 29	19:20	Fredy Setiawan (Indonesia); Khalimatus Sadiyah (Indonesia)	2–0	(Thailand) Siripong Teamarrom (Thailand) Nipada Seansupa	21–5	21–17		Report
Aug 30	21:20	Fredy Setiawan (Indonesia); Khalimatus Sadiyah (Indonesia)	2–0	(China) Yang Jianyuan (China) Yang Qiuxia	23–21	21–16		Report
Aug 30	21:20	Taiyo Imai (Japan); Noriko Ito (Japan)	1–2	(Thailand) Siripong Teamarrom (Thailand) Nipada Seansupa	21–18	18–21	19–21	Report

== Finals ==
The knockout stage will be played from 31 August to 1 September.

Semi-finals
1	Hikmat Ramdani (INA); Leani Ratri Oktila (INA)	21	21
Siripong Teamarrom (THA); Nipada Seansupa (THA)	12	8
Lucas Mazur (FRA); Faustine Noël (FRA)	15	15
2	Fredy Setiawan (INA); Khalimatus Sadiyah (INA)	21	21

Gold medal match
1	Hikmat Ramdani (INA) (gold); Leani Ratri Oktila (INA)	21	21
2	Fredy Setiawan (INA) (silver); Khalimatus Sadiyah (INA)	16	15
Bronze medal match
Siripong Teamarrom (THA); Nipada Seansupa (THA)	14	16
Lucas Mazur (FRA) (bronze); Faustine Noël (FRA)	21	21
