= Badminton at the 2023 European Para Championships – Men's singles SL4 =

Badminton's men's singles SL4 at the 2023 European Para Championships
- Venue: Rotterdam Ahoy, Rotterdam
- Dates: 15 – 20 August
- Competitors: 20 from 9 nations

Medalists
gold medal	Lucas Mazur	France
silver medal	Rickard Nilsson	Sweden
bronze medal	Diogo Daniel	Portugal
bronze medal	Marcel Adam	Germany

The men's singles SL4 badminton tournament at the 2023 European Para Championships was played from 15 to 20 August 2023 in Rotterdam Ahoy, Rotterdam. A total of 20 players competed at the tournament, six of whom was seeded.

== Competition schedule ==
Play took place between 15 and 20 August.

GS	Group stage	R16	Round of 16	¼	Quarterfinals	½	Semifinals	F	Final

Events	Tue 15	Wed 16	Thu 17	Fri 18		Sat 19	Sun 20
Men's singles SL4	GS	GS	GS	R16	¼	½	F

== Seeds ==
The following players were seeded:

1. Lucas Mazur (FRA) (champion; gold medalist)
2. Rickard Nilsson (SWE) (final; silver medalist)
3. Guillaume Gailly (FRA) (quarter-finals)
4. Marcel Adam (GER) (semi-finals; bronze medalist)
5. Jan-Niklas Pott (GER) (quarter-finals)
6. Diogo Daniel (POR) (semi-finals; bronze medalist)

== Group stage ==
=== Group A ===
Pos	Team	Pld	W	L	GF	GA	GD	PF	PA	PD	Qualification
1	Lucas Mazur (FRA) [1]	2	2	0	4	0	+4	84	26	+58	Qualification to elimination stage
2	Dilan Jacobsson (SWE)	2	1	1	2	2	0	62	62	0	Qualification to elimination stage
3	Fuat Soruklu (TUR)	2	0	2	0	4	−4	26	84	−58	

Source: Group A – standings

Date		Score		Game 1	Game 2	Game 3
15 August	Lucas Mazur (France)	2–0	(Sweden) Dilan Jacobsson	21–12	21–8	
16 August	Lucas Mazur (France)	2–0	(Turkey) Fuat Soruklu	21–3	21–3	
17 August	Dilan Jacobsson (Sweden)	2–0	(Turkey) Fuat Soruklu	21–10	21–10	

=== Group B ===
Pos	Team	Pld	W	L	GF	GA	GD	PF	PA	PD	Qualification
1	Rickard Nilsson (SWE) [2]	2	2	0	4	1	+3	98	70	+28	Qualification to elimination stage
2	Nils Böning (GER)	2	1	1	3	3	0	105	102	+3	Qualification to elimination stage
3	Clément Sarrobert (FRA)	2	0	2	1	4	−3	68	99	−31	

Source: Group B – standings

Date		Score		Game 1	Game 2	Game 3
15 August	Rickard Nilsson (Sweden)	2–1	(Germany) Nils Böning	21–16	14–21	21–11
16 August	Rickard Nilsson (Sweden)	2–0	(France) Clément Sarrobert	21–9	21–13	
17 August	Nils Böning (Germany)	2–1	(France) Clément Sarrobert	15–21	21–10	21–15

=== Group C ===
Pos	Team	Pld	W	L	GF	GA	GD	PF	PA	PD	Qualification
1	Guillaume Gailly (FRA) [3/4]	2	2	0	4	0	+4	84	38	+46	Qualification to elimination stage
2	Antony Forster (GBR)	2	1	1	2	2	0	60	65	−5	Qualification to elimination stage
3	Jareth van der Weijden (NED) (H)	2	0	2	0	4	−4	43	84	−41	

Source: Group C – standings
(H) Host

Date		Score		Game 1	Game 2	Game 3
15 August	Guillaume Gailly (France)	2–0	(United Kingdom) Antony Forster	21–6	21–12	
16 August	Guillaume Gailly (France)	2–0	(Netherlands) Jareth van der Weijden	21–12	21–8	
17 August	Antony Forster (United Kingdom)	2–0	(Netherlands) Jareth van der Weijden	21–13	21–10	

=== Group D ===
Pos	Team	Pld	W	L	GF	GA	GD	PF	PA	PD	Qualification
1	Marcel Adam (GER) [3/4]	2	2	0	4	0	+4	84	50	+34	Qualification to elimination stage
2	Pierre Delsol (FRA)	2	0	2	0	4	−4	55	84	−29	Qualification to elimination stage
3	Dominik Bützberger (SUI)	2	1	1	2	2	0	65	70	−5	

Source: Group D – standings

Date		Score		Game 1	Game 2	Game 3
15 August	Marcel Adam (Germany)	2–0	(France) Pierre Delsol	21–14	21–13	
16 August	Marcel Adam (Germany)	2–0	(Switzerland) Dominik Bützberger	21–16	21–7	
17 August	Pierre Delsol (France)	0–2	(Switzerland) Dominik Bützberger	13–21	15–21	

=== Group E ===
Pos	Team	Pld	W	L	GF	GA	GD	PF	PA	PD	Qualification
1	Jan-Niklas Pott (GER) [5/6]	3	3	0	6	0	+6	126	80	+46	Qualification to elimination stage
2	Antonin Richard (FRA)	3	2	1	4	3	+1	132	103	+29	Qualification to elimination stage
3	Mathis Clément (FRA)	3	1	2	3	4	−1	121	110	+11	
4	Bruno Faria (POR)	3	0	3	0	6	−6	40	126	−86	

Source: Group E – standings

Date		Score		Game 1	Game 2	Game 3
15 August	Jan-Niklas Pott (Germany)	2–0	(Portugal) Bruno Faria	21–7	21–9	
15 August	Mathis Clément (France)	1–2	(France) Antonin Richard	14–21	21–15	13–21
16 August	Bruno Faria (Portugal)	0–2	(France) Antonin Richard	4–21	9–21	
16 August	Jan-Niklas Pott (Germany)	2–0	(France) Mathis Clément	21–16	21–15	
17 August	Bruno Faria (Portugal)	0–2	(France) Mathis Clément	5–21	6–21	
17 August	Jan-Niklas Pott (Germany)	2–0	(France) Antonin Richard	21–17	21–16	

=== Group F ===
Pos	Team	Pld	W	L	GF	GA	GD	PF	PA	PD	Qualification
1	Diogo Daniel (POR) [5/6]	3	3	0	6	0	+6	126	44	+82	Qualification to elimination stage
2	Şükrü Gül (TUR)	3	2	1	4	2	+2	106	82	+24	Qualification to elimination stage
3	Teddy Ferrazza (FRA)	3	1	2	2	4	−2	79	102	−23	
4	Róbert Kertész (HUN)	3	0	3	0	6	−6	43	126	−83	

Source: Group F – standings

Date		Score		Game 1	Game 2	Game 3
15 August	Diogo Daniel (Portugal)	2–0	(Turkey) Şükrü Gül	21–7	21–15	
15 August	Teddy Ferrazza (France)	2–0	(Hungary) Róbert Kertész	21–14	21–4	
16 August	Şükrü Gül (Turkey)	2–0	(Hungary) Róbert Kertész	21–7	21–8	
16 August	Diogo Daniel (Portugal)	2–0	(France) Teddy Ferrazza	21–6	21–6	
17 August	Şükrü Gül (Turkey)	2–0	(France) Teddy Ferrazza	21–14	21–11	
17 August	Diogo Daniel (Portugal)	2–0	(Hungary) Róbert Kertész	21–5	21–5	

== Elimination stage ==
Round of 16
Şükrü Gül (TUR)	18	7
Nils Böning (GER)	21	21
5/6	Diogo Daniel (POR)	21	21
Dominik Bützberger (SUI)	9	10
Antony Forster (ENG)	11	11
5/6	Jan-Niklas Pott (GER)	21	21
Antonin Richard (FRA)	17	20
Dilan Jacobsson (SWE)	21	22

Quarter-finals
1	Lucas Mazur (FRA)	21	21
Nils Böning (GER)	7	5
3/4	Guillaume Gailly (FRA)	16	22
5/6	Diogo Daniel (POR)	21	24
5/6	Jan-Niklas Pott (GER)	15	17
3/4	Marcel Adam (GER)	21	21
Dilan Jacobsson (SWE)	20	14
2	Rickard Nilsson (SWE)	22	21

Semi-finals
1	Lucas Mazur (FRA)	21	21
5/6	Diogo Daniel (POR)	14	10
3/4	Marcel Adam (GER)	20	18
2	Rickard Nilsson (SWE)	22	21

Final
1	Lucas Mazur (FRA)	21	21
2	Rickard Nilsson (SWE)	5	12
