= Badminton at the 2017 ASEAN Para Games =

- Venue: Axiata Arena
- Location: Kuala Lumpur, Malaysia
- Date: 18–22 September

Badminton at the 2017 ASEAN Para Games was held at Axiata Arena, Kuala Lumpur.

== Classification ==
Players were classified to six different classes as per determined by Badminton World Federation.

== Medal tally ==
* Host nation (Malaysia)

| Rank | Nation | Gold | Silver | Bronze | Total |
|---|---|---|---|---|---|
| 1 | Indonesia (INA) | 8 | 5 | 4 | 17 |
| 2 | Malaysia (MAS)* | 4 | 3 | 8 | 15 |
| 3 | Thailand (THA) | 2 | 5 | 11 | 18 |
| 4 | Vietnam (VIE) | 0 | 1 | 1 | 2 |
| 5 | Singapore (SGP) | 0 | 0 | 1 | 1 |
| Totals (5 entries) | | 14 | 14 | 25 | 53 |

== Medalists ==
=== Men ===
| Event | Class | Gold | Silver | Bronze |
|---|---|---|---|---|
| Singles | SL3 | Ukun Rukaendi; Indonesia | Muhammad Zuhairi Abdul Malek; Malaysia | Dwiyoko; Indonesia |
| Singles | SL3 | Ukun Rukaendi; Indonesia | Muhammad Zuhairi Abdul Malek; Malaysia | Maman Nurjaman; Indonesia |
| Singles | SL4 | Hary Susanto; Indonesia | Chawarat Kittichokwattana; Thailand | Fredy Setiawan; Indonesia |
| Singles | SL4 | Hary Susanto; Indonesia | Chawarat Kittichokwattana; Thailand | Bakri Omar; Malaysia |
| Singles | SS6 | Didin Taresoh; Malaysia | Muhammad Naim Ahmad Halmi; Malaysia | Bunthan Yaemmali; Thailand |
| Singles | SU5 | Cheah Liek Hou; Malaysia | Suryo Nugroho; Indonesia | Dheva Anrimusthi; Indonesia |
| Singles | SU5 | Cheah Liek Hou; Malaysia | Suryo Nugroho; Indonesia | Tay Wei Ming; Singapore |
| Singles | WH1 | Jakarin Homhual; Thailand | Muhammad Ikhwan Ramli; Malaysia | Anuwat Sriboran; Thailand |
| Singles | WH1 | Jakarin Homhual; Thailand | Muhammad Ikhwan Ramli; Malaysia | Chatchai Kornpeekanok; Thailand |
| Singles | WH2 | Madzlan Saibon; Malaysia | Trương Ngọc Bình; Vietnam | Junthong Dumnern; Thailand |
| Singles | WH2 | Madzlan Saibon; Malaysia | Trương Ngọc Bình; Vietnam | Aphichat Sumpradit; Thailand |
| Doubles | SL3/4 | Indonesia (INA); Ukun Rukaendi; Hary Susanto | Indonesia (INA); Dwiyoko; Fredy Setiawan | Malaysia (MAS); Mohd Sibil Guri; Bakri Omar |
| Doubles | SL3/4 | Indonesia (INA); Ukun Rukaendi; Hary Susanto | Indonesia (INA); Dwiyoko; Fredy Setiawan | Thailand (THA); Subpong Meepian; Siripong Teamarrom |
| Doubles | SU5 | Indonesia (INA); Dheva Anrimusthi; Hafizh Briliansyah | Indonesia (INA); Suryo Nugroho; Oddie Kurnia Dwi Listyanto | Malaysia (MAS); Cheah Liek Hou; Hairul Fozi Saaba |
| Doubles | SU5 | Indonesia (INA); Dheva Anrimusthi; Hafizh Briliansyah | Indonesia (INA); Suryo Nugroho; Oddie Kurnia Dwi Listyanto | Malaysia (MAS); Mohamad Faris Ahmad Azri; Ahmad Effendi Razaman |
| Doubles | WH1/2 | Malaysia (MAS); Muhammad Ikhwan Ramli; Madzlan Saibon | Thailand (THA); Junthong Dumnern; Jakarin Homhual | Vietnam (VIE); Hoàng Mạnh Giang; Trương Ngọc Bình |
| Doubles | WH1/2 | Malaysia (MAS); Muhammad Ikhwan Ramli; Madzlan Saibon | Thailand (THA); Junthong Dumnern; Jakarin Homhual | Thailand (THA); Chatchai Kornpeekanok; Aphichat Sumpradit |

=== Women ===
| Event | Class | Gold | Silver | Bronze |
|---|---|---|---|---|
| Singles | SL4 | Leani Ratri Oktila; Indonesia | Khalimatus Sadiyah; Indonesia | Nursyazwani Shahrom; Malaysia |
| Singles | SL4 | Leani Ratri Oktila; Indonesia | Khalimatus Sadiyah; Indonesia | Nipada Saensupa; Thailand |
| Singles | SU5 | Warining Rahayu; Indonesia | Noorrizah Rahim; Malaysia | Nisa Kaekhunnok; Thailand |
| Singles | SU5 | Warining Rahayu; Indonesia | Noorrizah Rahim; Malaysia | Nor Fariha Kamarudin; Malaysia |
| Singles | WH2 | Amnouy Wetwithan; Thailand | Sujirat Pookkham; Thailand | Piyawan Thinjun; Thailand |
| Doubles | SL3–SU5 | Indonesia (INA); Leani Ratri Oktila; Khalimatus Sadiyah | Thailand (THA); Nipada Saensupa; Chanida Srinavakul | Malaysia (MAS); Nabilah Ahmat Sharif; Nursyazwani Shahrom |

=== Mixed ===
| Event | Class | Gold | Silver | Bronze |
|---|---|---|---|---|
| Doubles | SL3–SU5 | Indonesia (INA); Hary Susanto; Leani Ratri Oktila | Indonesia (INA); Fredy Setiawan; Khalimatus Sadiyah | Thailand (THA); Chawarat Kittichokwattana; Chanida Srinavakul |
| Doubles | SL3–SU5 | Indonesia (INA); Hary Susanto; Leani Ratri Oktila | Indonesia (INA); Fredy Setiawan; Khalimatus Sadiyah | Thailand (THA); Siripong Teamarrom; Nipada Saensupa |

== See also ==
- Badminton at the 2017 Southeast Asian Games
