= Badminton at the 2015 ASEAN Para Games =

Badminton at the 2015 ASEAN Para Games was held at OCBC Arena, Singapore.

== Medal table ==
Rank	Nation	Gold	Silver	Bronze	Total
1	Indonesia (INA)	8	4	7	19
2	Thailand (THA)	5	4	8	17
3	Malaysia (MAS)	2	4	5	11
4	Vietnam (VIE)	0	3	3	6
Totals (4 entries)		15	15	23	53

== Medalists ==
=== Men ===
Event	Gold	Silver	Bronze
Singles SL3	Ukun Rukaendi; Indonesia	Pham Duc Trung; Vietnam	Muhammad Huzairi bin Abdul Malek; Malaysia
Singles SL3	Ukun Rukaendi; Indonesia	Pham Duc Trung; Vietnam	Dwiyoko; Indonesia
Singles SL4	Hary Susanto; Indonesia	Bakri bin Omar; Malaysia	Le Quoc Manh; Vietnam
Singles SL4	Hary Susanto; Indonesia	Bakri bin Omar; Malaysia	Fredy Setiawan; Indonesia
Singles SU5	Suryo Nugroho; Indonesia	Cheah Liek Hou; Malaysia	Imam Kunantoro; Indonesia
Singles SU5	Suryo Nugroho; Indonesia	Cheah Liek Hou; Malaysia	Oddie Kurnia Dwi Listyanto; Indonesia
Singles WH1	Jakarin Homhual; Thailand	Anuwat Sriboran; Thailand	Mohd Johari bin Saed; Malaysia
Singles WH1	Jakarin Homhual; Thailand	Anuwat Sriboran; Thailand	Chatchai Kornpekanok; Thailand
Singles WH2	Madzlan bin Saibon; Malaysia	Truong Ngoc Binh; Vietnam	Rahim bin Mohd Yusof; Malaysia
Singles WH2	Madzlan bin Saibon; Malaysia	Truong Ngoc Binh; Vietnam	Agus Budi Utomo; Indonesia
Doubles SL3/4	Indonesia (INA); Hary Susanto; Ukun Rukaendi	Indonesia (INA); Dwiyoko; Fredy Setiawan	Vietnam (VIE); Nguyen Van Thuong; Pham Duc Trung
Doubles SL3/4	Indonesia (INA); Hary Susanto; Ukun Rukaendi	Indonesia (INA); Dwiyoko; Fredy Setiawan	Malaysia (MAS); Bakri bin Omar; Muhammad Huzairi bin Abdul Malek
Doubles SU5	Malaysia (MAS); Cheah Liek Hou; Hairulfozi bin Saaba	Indonesia (INA); Oddie Kurnia Dwi Listyanto; Suryo Nugroho	Malaysia (MAS); Ahmad Effendi bin Razaman; Mohamad Faris bin Ahmad Azri
Doubles SU5	Malaysia (MAS); Cheah Liek Hou; Hairulfozi bin Saaba	Indonesia (INA); Oddie Kurnia Dwi Listyanto; Suryo Nugroho	Indonesia (INA); Arya Sadewa; Imam Kunantoro
Doubles WH1/2	Thailand (THA); Junthong Dumnern; Jakarin Homhaul	Vietnam (VIE); Tran Mai Anh; Truong Ngoc Binh	Thailand (THA); Sumpradit Aphichat; Chatchai Kornpekanok
Team	Indonesia (INA); Suryo Nugroho; Oddie Kurnia Dwi Listyanto; Hary Susanto; Fredy Setiawan	Malaysia (MAS); Cheah Liek Hou; Mohamad Farid bin Ahmad Azri; Ahmad Effendi bin Razaman; Bakri bin Omar; Hairulfozi bin Saaba; Muhammad Huzairi bin Abdul Malek	Thailand (THA); Chawarat Kitichokwattana; Dachathon Saengrayakul; Narinchort Khowbunyarasri; Pricha Somsiri
Team	Indonesia (INA); Suryo Nugroho; Oddie Kurnia Dwi Listyanto; Hary Susanto; Fredy Setiawan	Malaysia (MAS); Cheah Liek Hou; Mohamad Farid bin Ahmad Azri; Ahmad Effendi bin Razaman; Bakri bin Omar; Hairulfozi bin Saaba; Muhammad Huzairi bin Abdul Malek	Vietnam (VIE); Nguyen Van Thuong; Le Van; Le Quoc Manh; Pham Hong Tuan

=== Women ===
Event	Gold	Silver	Bronze
Singles SL3	Sriyanti; Indonesia	Paramee Panyachaem; Thailand	-
Singles SL4	Leani Ratri Oktila; Indonesia	Khalimatus Sadiyah; Indonesia	Chanida Srinavakul; Thailand
Singles SL4	Leani Ratri Oktila; Indonesia	Khalimatus Sadiyah; Indonesia	Nipada Seangsupa; Thailand
Singles SU5	Sudsaifon Yodpha; Thailand	Noorizah binti Rahim; Malaysia	-
Singles WH1/2	Amnouy Wetwithan; Thailand	Sujirat Pookkham; Thailand	Piyawan Thinjun; Thailand
Doubles SL3/4/SU5	Indonesia (INA); Khalimatus Sadiyah; Leani Ratri Oktila	Thailand (THA); Nipada Seangsupa; Chanida Srinavakul	Thailand (THA); Sudsaifon Yodpha; Wannaphatdee Kamtam

=== Mixed ===
Event	Gold	Silver	Bronze
Doubles SL3/4/SU5	Indonesia (INA); Leani Ratri Oktila; Fredy Setiawan	Thailand (THA); Nipada Seangsupa; Dachathon Saengarayakul	Indonesia (INA); Khalimatus Sadiyah; Hary Susanto
Doubles SL3/4/SU5	Indonesia (INA); Leani Ratri Oktila; Fredy Setiawan	Thailand (THA); Nipada Seangsupa; Dachathon Saengarayakul	Thailand (THA); Chanida Srinavakul; Chawarat Kitichokwattana
