= Hary Susanto =

Indonesian para-badminton player (born 1975)

Personal information
- Born: 25 January 1975 (age 51) Majalengka, West Java, Indonesia

Sport
- Country: Indonesia
- Sport: Badminton

Men's doubles SL3–SU5 Mixed doubles SL3–SU5
- Highest ranking: 1 (MD with Ukun Rukaendi 1 January 2019); 1 (XD with Leani Ratri Oktila 1 January 2019)
- Current ranking: 23 (MD with Ukun Rukaendi); 13 (XD with Leani Ratri Oktila) (8 November 2022)
- BWF profile
Medal record
Men's para-badminton
Representing Indonesia
Paralympic Games
Gold medal – first place	2020 Tokyo	Mixed doubles
World Championships
Gold medal – first place	2017 Ulsan	Men's doubles
Gold medal – first place	2017 Ulsan	Mixed doubles
Gold medal – first place	2019 Basel	Mixed doubles
Bronze medal – third place	2019 Basel	Men's doubles
Asian Para Games
Gold medal – first place	2010 Guangzhou	Men's doubles
Gold medal – first place	2014 Incheon	Men's doubles
Gold medal – first place	2018 Jakarta	Mixed doubles
Gold medal – first place	2018 Jakarta	Men's team
Silver medal – second place	2010 Guangzhou	Men's singles
Asian Championships
Gold medal – first place	2016 Beijing	Men's doubles
Silver medal – second place	2016 Beijing	Men's singles
ASEAN Para Games
Gold medal – first place	2015 Singapore	Men's singles
Gold medal – first place	2015 Singapore	Men's doubles
Gold medal – first place	2015 Singapore	Men's team
Gold medal – first place	2017 Kuala Lumpur	Men's singles
Gold medal – first place	2017 Kuala Lumpur	Men's doubles
Gold medal – first place	2017 Kuala Lumpur	Mixed doubles
Gold medal – first place	2022 Surakarta	Men's team
Gold medal – first place	2023 Cambodia	Men's team
Gold medal – first place	2023 Cambodia	Men's doubles
Silver medal – second place	2022 Surakarta	Men's doubles
Bronze medal – third place	2015 Singapore	Mixed doubles

Hary Susanto (born 25 January 1975) is an Indonesian para-badminton player who has played each of the three variations of the sport (men's singles, men's doubles, and mixed doubles) at the highest world level. He has won a gold medal at the Summer Paralympics, four medals at the BWF Para-Badminton World Championships, five medals at the Asian Para Games and eleven medals at the ASEAN Para Games.

In 2021, Susanto represented Indonesia in the men's singles and mixed doubles event of the 2020 Summer Paralympics, winning the gold medal in the latter.

== Awards and nominations ==
Award	Year	Category	Result	Ref.
Indonesian Sport Awards	2018	Most Favorited Men's Team Para Athlete (with 2018 Asian Para Games Men's Team Standing)	Won	
BWF Awards	2020–2021	BWF Para Badminton Pair of The Year (with Leani Ratri Oktila)	Nominated	
Golden Award SIWO PWI	2021	Best Male Para Athlete	Won	

== Achievements ==
=== Paralympic Games ===
Mixed doubles SL3–SU5

Year	Venue	Partner	Opponent	Score	Result
2021	Yoyogi National Gymnasium, Tokyo, Japan	(Indonesia) Leani Ratri Oktila	(France) Lucas Mazur (France) Faustine Noël	23–21, 21–17	Gold

=== World Championships ===
Men's doubles SL3–SL4

Year	Venue	Partner	Opponent	Score	Result
2017	Dongchun Gymnasium, Ulsan, South Korea	(Indonesia) Ukun Rukaendi	(China) Chen Xiaoyu (China) Yang Jianyuan	21–10, 21–12	Gold
2019	St. Jakobshalle, Basel, Switzerland	(Indonesia) Ukun Rukaendi	(India) Kumar Nitesh (India) Tarun Dhillon	21–23, 9–21	Bronze

Mixed doubles SL3–SU5

Year	Venue	Partner	Opponent	Score	Result
2017	Dongchun Gymnasium, Ulsan, South Korea	(Indonesia) Leani Ratri Oktila	(China) Yang Jianyuan (China) Yang Qiuxia	21–14, 21–14	Gold
2019	St. Jakobshalle, Basel, Switzerland	(Indonesia) Leani Ratri Oktila	(Germany) Jann-Niklas Pott (Germany) Katrin Seibert	21–4, 21–11	Gold

=== Asian Para Games ===
Men's singles SL4

Year	Venue	Opponent	Score	Result
2010	Tianhe Gymnasium, Guangzhou, China	(Hong Kong) Yu Kwong Wah	15–21, 10–21	Silver

Men's doubles SL3–SL4

Year	Venue	Partner	Opponent	Score	Result
2010	Tianhe Gymnasium, Guangzhou, China	(Indonesia) Trihono	(Chinese Taipei) Chiang Chung-hou (Chinese Taipei) Lin Cheng-che	21–17, 21–12	Gold
2014	Gyeyang Gymnasium, Incheon, South Korea	(Indonesia) Ukun Rukaendi	(Indonesia) Dwiyoko (Indonesia) Fredy Setiawan	21–15, 21–13	Gold

Mixed doubles SL3–SU5

Year	Venue	Partner	Opponent	Score	Result
2018	Istora Gelora Bung Karno, Jakarta, Indonesia	(Indonesia) Leani Ratri Oktila	(Thailand) Siripong Teamarrom (Thailand) Nipada Saensupa	21–17, 21–10	Gold

=== Asian Championships ===
Men's singles SL4

Year	Venue	Opponent	Score	Result
2016	China Administration of Sport for Persons with Disabilities, Beijing, China	(India) Suhas Lalinakere Yathiraj	4–21, 11–21	Silver

Men's doubles SL3–SL4

Year	Venue	Partner	Opponent	Score	Result
2016	China Administration of Sport for Persons with Disabilities, Beijing, China	(Indonesia) Ukun Rukaendi	(Malaysia) Muhammad Huzairi Abdul Malek (Malaysia) Bakri Omar	21–14, 21–16	Gold

=== ASEAN Para Games ===
Men's singles SL4

Year	Venue	Opponent	Score	Result
2015	OCBC Arena, Singapore	(Malaysia) Bakri Omar	21–13, 21–16	Gold
2017	Axiata Arena, Kuala Lumpur, Malaysia	(Thailand) Chawarat Kittichokwattana	21–16, 21–13	Gold

Men's doubles SL3–SL4

Year	Venue	Partner	Opponent	Score	Result
2015	OCBC Arena, Singapore	(Indonesia) Ukun Rukaendi	(Indonesia) Dwiyoko (Indonesia) Fredy Setiawan	21–7, 12–21, 21–17	Gold
2017	Axiata Arena, Kuala Lumpur, Malaysia	(Indonesia) Ukun Rukaendi	(Indonesia) Dwiyoko (Indonesia) Fredy Setiawan	21–15, 21–16	Gold
2022	Edutorium Muhammadiyah University of Surakarta, Surakarta, Indonesia	(Indonesia) Ukun Rukaendi	(Indonesia) Dwiyoko (Indonesia) Fredy Setiawan	14–21, 21–15, 10–21	Silver
2023	Morodok Techo Badminton Hall, Phnom Penh, Cambodia	(Indonesia) Ukun Rukaendi	(Indonesia) Dwiyoko (Indonesia) Fredy Setiawan	21–19, 13–21, 21–19	Gold

Mixed doubles SL3–SU5

Year	Venue	Partner	Opponent	Score	Result
2015	OCBC Arena, Singapore	(Indonesia) Khalimatus Sadiyah	(Indonesia) Fredy Setiawan (Indonesia) Leani Ratri Oktila	21–11, 21–11	Bronze
2017	Axiata Arena, Kuala Lumpur, Malaysia	(Indonesia) Leani Ratri Oktila	(Indonesia) Fredy Setiawan (Indonesia) Khalimatus Sadiyah	21–11, 21–13	Gold

=== BWF Para Badminton World Circuit (1 runner-up) ===
The BWF Para Badminton World Circuit – Grade 2, Level 1, 2 and 3 tournaments has been sanctioned by the Badminton World Federation from 2022.

Men's doubles SL3–SL4

Year	Tournament	Level	Partner	Opponent	Score	Result
2022	Indonesia Para Badminton International	Level 3	(Indonesia) Ukun Rukaendi	(Indonesia) Dwiyoko (Indonesia) Fredy Setiawan	17–21, 13–21	(silver) Runner-up

=== International tournaments (from 2011–2021) (14 titles, 3 runners-up) ===
Men's singles SL4

Year	Tournament	Opponent	Score	Result
2014	Indonesia Para Badminton International	(Malaysia) Bakri Omar	21–16, 21–10	(gold) Winner

Men's doubles SL3–SL4

Year	Tournament	Partner	Opponent	Score	Result
2014	Indonesia Para Badminton International	(Indonesia) Ukun Rukaendi	(Indonesia) Dwiyoko (Indonesia) Fredy Setiawan	21–11, 21–11	(gold) Winner
2016	Indonesia Para Badminton International	(Indonesia) Ukun Rukaendi	(Indonesia) Maman Nurjaman (Indonesia) Fredy Setiawan	21–11, 21–17	(gold) Winner
2018	Dubai Para Badminton International	(Indonesia) Ukun Rukaendi	(India) Kumar Nitesh (Indonesia) Fredy Setiawan	21–17, 21–15	(gold) Winner
2018	Irish Para Badminton International	(Indonesia) Ukun Rukaendi	(Indonesia) Maman Nurjaman (Indonesia) Hikmat Ramdani	21–14, 21–16	(gold) Winner
2018	Thailand Para Badminton International	(Indonesia) Ukun Rukaendi	(Indonesia) Dwiyoko (Indonesia) Fredy Setiawan	19–21, 23–21, 17–21	(silver) Runner-up

Mixed doubles SL3–SU5

Year	Tournament	Partner	Opponent	Score	Result
2016	Indonesia Para Badminton International	(Indonesia) Khalimatus Sadiyah	(Indonesia) Fredy Setiawan (Indonesia) Leani Ratri Oktila	13–21, 16–21	(silver) Runner-up
2017	Thailand Para Badminton International	(Indonesia) Leani Ratri Oktila	(France) Lucas Mazur (France) Faustine Noël	21–7, 21–11	(gold) Winner
2018	Dubai Para Badminton International	(Indonesia) Leani Ratri Oktila	(France) Lucas Mazur (France) Faustine Noël	21–18, 21–18	(gold) Winner
2018	Irish Para Badminton International	(Indonesia) Leani Ratri Oktila	(Indonesia) Fredy Setiawan (Indonesia) Khalimatus Sadiyah	21–5, 21–15	(gold) Winner
2018	Thailand Para Badminton International	(Indonesia) Leani Ratri Oktila	(Indonesia) Fredy Setiawan (Indonesia) Khalimatus Sadiyah	21–5, 21–10	(gold) Winner
2019	Turkish Para Badminton International	(Indonesia) Leani Ratri Oktila	(China) Ou Wie (China) Cheng Hefang	21–9, 21–13	(gold) Winner
2019	Dubai Para Badminton International	(Indonesia) Leani Ratri Oktila	(France) Lucas Mazur (France) Faustine Noël	21–19, 21–15	(gold) Winner
2019	Canada Para Badminton International	(Indonesia) Leani Ratri Oktila	(France) Lucas Mazur (France) Faustine Noël	21–16, 15–21, 21–13	(gold) Winner
2019	Irish Para Badminton International	(Indonesia) Leani Ratri Oktila	(France) Lucas Mazur (France) Faustine Noël	16–21, 21–16, 21–10	(gold) Winner
2020	Brazil Para Badminton International	(Indonesia) Leani Ratri Oktila	(France) Lucas Mazur (France) Faustine Noël	21–16, 21–9	(gold) Winner
2021	Dubai Para Badminton International	(Indonesia) Leani Ratri Oktila	(France) Lucas Mazur (France) Faustine Noël	12–21, 21–19, 19–21	(silver) Runner-up
