= Badminton at the 2020 Summer Paralympics – Mixed doubles SL3–SU5 =

Mixed doubles SL3–SU5 at the XVI Paralympic Games
- Venue: Yoyogi National Gymnasium
- Dates: 1–5 September 2021
- Competitors: 12 from 6 nations

Medalists
1st place, gold medalist(s)		Hary Susanto; Leani Ratri Oktila	Indonesia
2nd place, silver medalist(s)		Lucas Mazur; Faustine Noël	France
3rd place, bronze medalist(s)		Daisuke Fujihara; Akiko Sugino	Japan

The mixed doubles SL3–SU5 tournament at the 2020 Summer Paralympics in Tokyo took place between 1 and 5 September 2021 at Yoyogi National Gymnasium.

== Seeds ==
These were the seeds for this event:

1. Hary Susanto / Leani Ratri Oktila (INA) (gold medalists)
2. Lucas Mazur / Faustine Noël (FRA) (silver medalists)

== Group stage ==
The draw of the group stage revealed on 26 August 2021. The group stage was played from 1 to 3 September. The top two winners of each group advanced to the knockout rounds.

=== Group A ===
Pos	Team	Pld	W	L	GF	GA	GD	PF	PA	PD	Pts	Qualification
1	Hary Susanto (INA) (SL4) Leani Ratri Oktila (INA) (SL4)	2	2	0	4	0	+4	84	47	+37	2	Advance to semi-finals
2	Daisuke Fujihara (JPN) (SL3) Akiko Sugino (JPN) (SU5) (H)	2	1	1	2	2	0	69	76	−7	1	Advance to semi-finals
3	Jan-Niklas Pott (GER) (SL4) Katrin Seibert (GER) (SL4)	2	0	2	0	4	−4	58	88	−30	0	

Source: TOCOG
(H) Host

Date	Time	Player 1	Score	Player 2	Set 1	Set 2	Set 3
1 Sep	18:00	Hary Susanto (Indonesia); Leani Ratri Oktila (Indonesia)	2–0	(Japan) Daisuke Fujihara (Japan) Akiko Sugino	21–12	21–11	
2 Sep	20:00	Hary Susanto (Indonesia); Leani Ratri Oktila (Indonesia)	2–0	(Germany) Jan-Niklas Pott (Germany) Katrin Seibert	21–7	21–17	
3 Sep	11:40	Jan-Niklas Pott (Germany); Katrin Seibert (Germany)	0–2	(Japan) Daisuke Fujihara (Japan) Akiko Sugino	23–25	11–21	

=== Group B ===
Pos	Team	Pld	W	L	GF	GA	GD	PF	PA	PD	Pts	Qualification
1	Lucas Mazur (FRA) (SL4) Faustine Noël (FRA) (SL4)	2	2	0	4	1	+3	99	85	+14	2	Advance to Semi-finals
2	Pramod Bhagat (IND) (SL3) Palak Kohli (IND) (SU5)	2	1	1	3	2	+1	91	91	0	1	Advance to Semi-finals
3	Siripong Teamarrom (THA) (SL4) Nipada Saensupa (THA) (SL4)	2	0	2	0	4	−4	70	84	−14	0	

Source: TOCOG

Date	Time	Player 1	Score	Player 2	Set 1	Set 2	Set 3
1 Sep	18:00	Lucas Mazur (France); Faustine Noël (France)	2–1	(India) Pramod Bhagat (India) Palak Kohli	21–9	15–21	21–19
2 Sep	20:00	Lucas Mazur (France); Faustine Noël (France)	2–0	(Thailand) Siripong Teamarrom (Thailand) Nipada Saensupa	21–18	21–18	
3 Sep	11:40	Siripong Teamarrom (Thailand); Nipada Saensupa (Thailand)	0–2	(India) Pramod Bhagat (India) Palak Kohli	15–21	19–21	

== Finals ==
The knockout stage was played from 4 to 5 September.

Semi-finals
A1	Hary Susanto (INA); Leani Ratri Oktila (INA)	21	21
B2	Pramod Bhagat (IND); Palak Kohli (IND)	3	15
A2	Daisuke Fujihara (JPN); Akiko Sugino (JPN)	10	11
B1	Lucas Mazur (FRA); Faustine Noël (FRA)	21	21

Gold medal match
A1	Hary Susanto (INA); Leani Ratri Oktila (INA) (gold)	23	21
B1	Lucas Mazur (FRA); Faustine Noël (FRA) (silver)	21	17
Bronze medal match
B2	Pramod Bhagat (IND); Palak Kohli (IND)	21	19
A2	Daisuke Fujihara (JPN); Akiko Sugino (JPN) (bronze)	23	21
