= Leani Ratri Oktila =

Indonesian para-badminton player (born 1991)

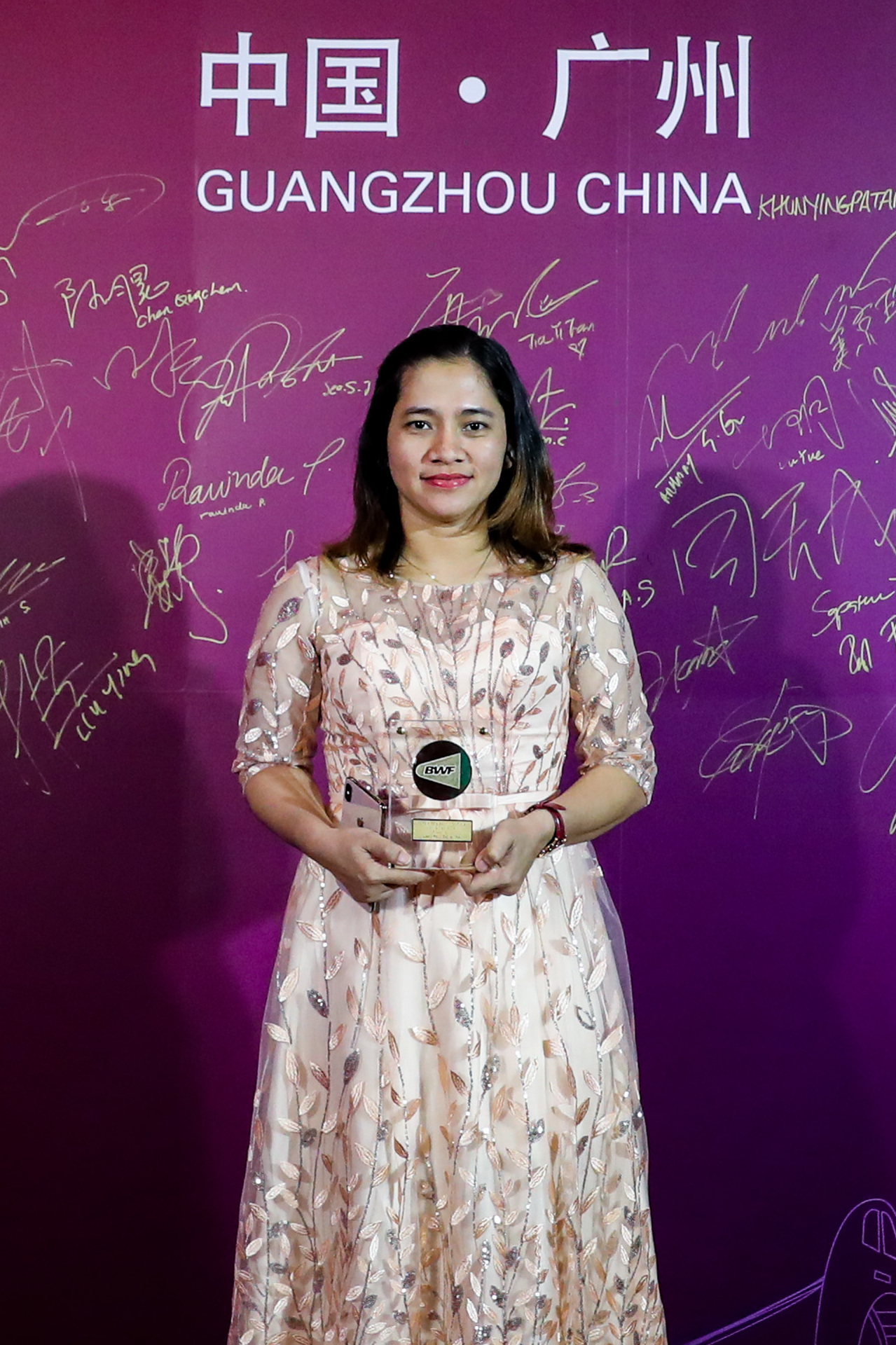
- Oktila won the 2019 BWF Awards at the 2019 BWF World Tour Final Gala Dinner

Personal information
- Born: 6 May 1991 (age 35) Kampar, Riau, Indonesia
- Height: 162 cm (5 ft 4 in)
- Weight: 69 kg (152 lb)

Sport
- Country: Indonesia
- Sport: Badminton
- Handedness: Right

Women's singles SL4 Women's doubles SL3–SU5 Mixed doubles SL3–SU5
- Highest ranking: 1 (WS 27 August 2019); 1 (WD with Khalimatus Sadiyah 18 February 2020); 1 (XD with Hary Susanto 18 February 2020)
- BWF profile
Medal record
Women's para-badminton
Representing Indonesia
Paralympic Games
Gold medal – first place	2020 Tokyo	Women's doubles
Gold medal – first place	2020 Tokyo	Mixed doubles
Gold medal – first place	2024 Paris	Mixed doubles
Silver medal – second place	2020 Tokyo	Women's singles
Silver medal – second place	2024 Paris	Women's singles
World Championships
Gold medal – first place	2017 Ulsan	Mixed doubles
Gold medal – first place	2019 Basel	Women’s singles
Gold medal – first place	2019 Basel	Mixed doubles
Gold medal – first place	2022 Tokyo	Women's doubles
Gold medal – first place	2024 Pattaya	Women's doubles
Gold medal – first place	2024 Pattaya	Mixed doubles
Gold medal – first place	2026 Manama	Women’s singles
Gold medal – first place	2026 Manama	Mixed doubles
Silver medal – second place	2017 Ulsan	Women's singles
Silver medal – second place	2019 Basel	Women's doubles
Silver medal – second place	2024 Pattaya	Women's singles
Silver medal – second place	2026 Manama	Women's doubles
Bronze medal – third place	2017 Ulsan	Women's doubles
World Abilitysport Games
Gold medal – first place	2023 Nakhon Ratchasima	Women's singles
Gold medal – first place	2023 Nakhon Ratchasima	Women's doubles
Gold medal – first place	2023 Nakhon Ratchasima	Mixed doubles
Asian Para Games
Gold medal – first place	2014 Incheon	Mixed doubles
Gold medal – first place	2018 Jakarta	Women's doubles
Gold medal – first place	2018 Jakarta	Mixed doubles
Gold medal – first place	2022 Hangzhou	Women's doubles
Gold medal – first place	2022 Hangzhou	Mixed doubles
Gold medal – first place	2026 Aichi–Nagoya	Mixed doubles
Silver medal – second place	2014 Incheon	Women's doubles
Silver medal – second place	2018 Jakarta	Women's singles
Silver medal – second place	2022 Hangzhou	Women's singles
Silver medal – second place	2026 Aichi–Nagoya	Women's singles
Bronze medal – third place	2014 Incheon	Women's singles
Bronze medal – third place	2026 Aichi–Nagoya	Women's doubles
ASEAN Para Games
Gold medal – first place	2015 Singapore	Women's singles
Gold medal – first place	2015 Singapore	Women's doubles
Gold medal – first place	2015 Singapore	Mixed doubles
Gold medal – first place	2017 Kuala Lumpur	Women's singles
Gold medal – first place	2017 Kuala Lumpur	Women's doubles
Gold medal – first place	2017 Kuala Lumpur	Mixed doubles
Gold medal – first place	2023 Cambodia	Women's singles
Gold medal – first place	2023 Cambodia	Women's doubles
Gold medal – first place	2023 Cambodia	Mixed doubles
Gold medal – first place	2025 Nakhon Ratchasima	Women's singles
Gold medal – first place	2025 Nakhon Ratchasima	Women's doubles
Gold medal – first place	2025 Nakhon Ratchasima	Mixed doubles

Leani Ratri Oktila (born 6 May 1991) is an Indonesian para badminton player. She played each of the three variations of the sport (women's singles, women's doubles, and mixed doubles) at the highest world level.

Born in Siabu, Kampar, Riau Province on the island of Sumatra as the second of ten children, she was raised in a modest household by her parents—a farmer father who tended to local crops and a homemaker mother who contributed to family sustenance through small-scale activities. Oktila's early education took place in local schools in Riau, where she completed her primary and secondary schooling before opportunities in sports led her to relocate for training.

In 2021, she won the first para-badminton gold medal representing Indonesia in the women's doubles SL3–SU5 event of the 2020 Summer Paralympics alongside Khalimatus Sadiyah. Oktila also won a silver medal in the women's singles event.

== Career ==
Oktila was introduced to badminton at the age of seven, under the direct guidance of her parents. Her talent stood out, enabling her to achieve success from a young age, including representing her province in national competitions. Initially, Oktila played badminton as a normal athlete since she was 8 years old, and she competed in national events starting from 1999. However, Oktila had a motorbike accident in 2011, causing her left leg to shrink, her left leg was 7 cm shorter than her right leg. Thus, she decided to move to the disability class. The immediate medical response involved emergency hospitalization and several surgeries to address the injuries, but they caused lasting mobility issues and balance difficulties. Oktila's rehabilitation process extended over more than a year, from 2011 into 2012, encompassing intensive physiotherapy sessions aimed at regaining basic function in her affected leg. Despite these efforts, the impairment persisted, fundamentally altering her physical capabilities.

To adapt to her impairment, Oktila underwent modified training focused on improving balance and stability, including single-leg strengthening exercises and endurance runs to compensate for her uneven gait. She initially used a cane for support but progressed to running on the court without aids, surprising medical professionals with her resilience.

Oktila impairment was assessed under Badminton World Federation (BWF) and International Paralympic Committee (IPC) standards, leading to her classification in the SL4 category for standing lower limb impairment. This class applies to athletes with moderate functional limitations in the lower limbs, such as leg length differences of at least 7 cm, which affect balance, propulsion, and the ability to control the shuttle during play. Her condition, stemming from post-traumatic bone shortening in the left leg, met the criteria for SL4, including clear evidence of impaired muscle power and range of motion in the lower limb. She later competed in combined SL3-SU5 events for doubles, where SU5 denotes mild upper limb or related standing impairments, but her primary individual classification remains SL4.

Oktila won her first para-badminton title at the 2012 National Paralympic Games (Peparnas), held in Riau, her home province. On that occasion, Ratri won one gold and one silver medal. Oktila joined the Indonesian National Paralympic Committee (NPC) in 2013. Together with the paralympic national team, Oktila is increasingly motivated to excel despite her limitations.

At the 2017 BWF Para-Badminton World Championships in Ulsan, South Korea, Oktila claimed gold medals in women's doubles SL3-SU5 with Khalimatus Sadiyah and mixed doubles SL3-SU5 with Hary Susanto.

By 2018, Oktila had established herself as a leader in the sport, having won the BWF's Para-Badminton Women's Player of the Year award after winning three of the four international singles tournaments that year. She claimed the triple crowns—gold medals in the women's SL4 singles, the women's SL3-SU5 doubles and the mixed SL3-SU5 doubles—at both the Irish Para Badminton International and the Canada Para Badminton International. At the Asian Para Games in Jakarta, she won multiple gold medals in various disciplines, cementing her regional dominance.

Oktila was one of the Indonesian athletes who brought home a medal from the Tokyo 2020 Paralympics. She won her first gold medal alongside Khalimatus Sadiyah in the women’s doubles. Sadiyah and Oktila defeated the Chinese pair, Cheng Hefang and Ma Huihui, with scores of 21–18 and 21–12 on Saturday, 4 September 2021. Oktila then competed again in the women’s singles, facing the Chinese player Cheng Hefang. Oktila lost after a three-set match, securing a silver medal on Sunday, 5 September 2021. Finally, Oktila gave her all in the mixed doubles final against the French pair, Lucas Mazur and Faustine Noel. Partnering Hary Susanto, Oktila successfully secured Indonesia’s second gold medal at the Tokyo 2020 Paralympics. Following Tokyo, Oktila took a break to give birth to her son in 2022, marking her return to competition at the 2022 BWF Para-Badminton World Championships.

Oktila won three gold medals at the 2023 Spanish Para Badminton International. Spanish Para Badminton International marked the resumption of regular BWF competitions for badminton players with disabilities in the 2023 season. This second-tier BWF Para Badminton International event was held from 20 to 26 February in Vitoria, Spain. It featured 22 categories across five different events. Indonesia brought home a total of nine medals, comprising seven gold and two bronze. Oktila, secured three of the six gold medals won by the Indonesian team. Oktila the title in the women’s singles SL4 category, the women’s doubles SL3 SU5 category, and the mixed doubles SL3 SU5 category. In the women’s singles, Oktila was crowned champion after defeating Japan’s Haruka Fujino in the final 21–11, 14–21, 21–13. Oktila then partnered Khalimatus Sadiyah in the women’s doubles. In the final, they defeated the Indian pair, Manasi Joshi and Shanthiya Viswanathan, in straight games 21–9, 21–19. In the mixed doubles, Oktila, partnered with Hikmat Ramdani, defeated Chirag Baretha and Mandeep Kaur in straight games, 21–11, 21–12.

Oktila success continued at the Asian Para Games in Hangzhou, China, where she won gold in the women's doubles SL3-SU5 with Khalimatus Sadiyah, mixed doubles SL3-SU5 with Hikmat Ramdani and silver in the women's singles SL4 against Cheng Hefang again. Over these three editions, she has amassed at least nine medals, including multiple golds, establishing her as a dominant force in Asian para-badminton.

At the 2024 BWF Para-Badminton World Championships in Thailand, Oktila achieved a historic milestone just months after resuming full competition post-motherhood, winning gold in mixed doubles SL3-SU5 with Ramdani (defeating compatriots Fredy Setiawan and Sadiyah 21–9, 21–16) and gold in women's doubles SL3-SU5 with Sadiyah (overcoming India's Manasi Joshi and Thulasimathi Murugesan 22–20, 21–17), while earning silver in women's singles SL4 against China's Cheng Hefang.

Oktila has once again captured the spotlight at the Paris 2024 Paralympics after winning two medals for Indonesia. Oktila secured two medals in the women’s singles SL4 and mixed doubles SL3-SU5 events at the 2024 Paralympics. Oktila won gold in the mixed doubles category alongside Hikmat Ramdani after defeating her compatriots, Khalimatus Sadiyah and Fredy Setiawan. Oktila and Ramdani won 21–16, 21–15 against Sadiyah and Setiawan, who secured a silver medal for Indonesia on Monday, 2 September 2024.

Oktila won three gold medals at the 2025 ASEAN Para Games held in Thailand. Oktila won these three gold medals in the SL3-SU5 mixed doubles event, partnering with Hikmat Ramdani; the SL4 women’s doubles event; and the SL3-SU5 women’s doubles event alongside Khalimatus Sadiyah. Speaking at the Indoor Stadium of the SPADT Convention Centre on the afternoon of Sunday 25 January 2026, Oktila expressed her gratitude for having maintained her consistency right through to this.

Oktila was crowned the 2026 World Champion in the women’s singles SL4. The final of the 2026 BWF Para-Badminton World Championships took place at the Isa Sport Hall in Bahrain on Saturday 14 February 2026. Oktila secured the gold medal following her victory over Huang Zixuan (China). Oktila put up a hard-fought battle against Huang. In a three-game contest, she defeated Huang with scores of 21–9, 19–21, 21–14. Oktila journey to the World Championship title in the women’s singles SL4 category was a brilliant one. She defeated the top seed, Helle Sofie Sagøy of Norway, in the semi-finals with scores of 21–9, 21–18. Earlier in the quarter-finals, she defeated Cheng Hefang from China 24-22, 21-19. Oktila's gold medal haul at the 2026 World Championships grew further after she also became World Champion in the mixed doubles category. Ramdani and Oktila defeated the Chinese pair, Yang Jianyuan and Yang Qiuxia, with a score of 21–6, 21–15.

Oktila managed to secure five gold medals from two events of the 2026 BWF Para-Badminton world circuit in Europe. Oktila participate in two top-class events in June 2026, namely the French Para Badminton International 2026 in Mulhouse, France, on June 16–21 and the British & Irish Para Badminton International in Dublin, Republic of Ireland, on June 24–28. Oktila consistently became the champion of the women's singles SL4 and the mixed doubles SL3-SU5 with Hikmat Ramdani. Meanwhile, another gold medal he won when paired with Khalimatus Sadiyah in the women's doubles SL3-SU5. Oktila achieved her first three-title sweep of the season at the 2026 British & Irish Para Badminton International. Her last three-title sweep had come at the 2024 Indonesia Para Badminton International in September.

== Education ==
Oktila obtained her bachelor’s degree in Sports Science from the University of Riau, Pekanbaru. She then obtained Master’s degree in Indonesian Language Education at Bangun Nusantara Veterans University, Sukoharjo.

== Achievements ==
=== Paralympic Games ===
Women's singles

Year	Venue	Opponent	Score	Result	Ref
2020	Yoyogi National Gymnasium, Tokyo, Japan	(China) Cheng Hefang	19–21, 21–17, 16–21	Silver	
2024	Arena Porte de La Chapelle, Paris, France	(China) Cheng Hefang	14–21, 18–21	Silver	

Women's doubles

Year	Venue	Partner	Opponent	Score	Result	Ref
2020	Yoyogi National Gymnasium, Tokyo, Japan	(Indonesia) Khalimatus Sadiyah	(China) Cheng Hefang (China) Ma Huihui	21–18, 21–12	Gold	

Mixed doubles

Year	Venue	Partner	Opponent	Score	Result	Ref
2020	Yoyogi National Gymnasium, Tokyo, Japan	(Indonesia) Hary Susanto	(France) Lucas Mazur (France) Faustine Noël	23–21, 21–17	Gold	
2024	Arena Porte de La Chapelle, Paris, France	(Indonesia) Hikmat Ramdani	(Indonesia) Fredy Setiawan (Indonesia) Khalimatus Sadiyah	21–16, 21–15	Gold	

=== World Championships ===
Women's singles

Year	Venue	Opponent	Score	Result	Ref
2017	Dongchun Gymnasium, Ulsan, South Korea	(China) Cheng Hefang	14–21, 13–21	Silver	
2019	St. Jakobshalle, Basel, Switzerland	(China) Cheng Hefang	21–16, 21–16	Gold	
2024	Pattaya Exhibition and Convention Hall, Pattaya, Thailand	(China) Cheng Hefang	11–21, 9–21	Silver	
2026	Isa Sports City, Manama, Bahrain	(China) Huang Zixuan	21–9, 19–21, 21–14	Gold	

Women’s doubles

Year	Venue	Partner	Opponent	Score	Result	Ref
2017	Dongchun Gymnasium, Ulsan, South Korea	(Indonesia) Khalimatus Sadiyah	(China) Cheng Hefang (China) Ma Huihui	12–21, 19–21	Bronze	
2019	St. Jakobshalle, Basel, Switzerland	(Indonesia) Khalimatus Sadiyah	(China) Cheng Hefang (China) Ma Huihui	17–21, 12–21	Silver	
2022	Yoyogi National Gymnasium, Tokyo, Japan	(Indonesia) Khalimatus Sadiyah	(France) Lénaïg Morin (France) Faustine Noël	21–14, 16–21, 21–13	Gold	
2024	Pattaya Exhibition and Convention Hall, Pattaya, Thailand	(Indonesia) Khalimatus Sadiyah	(India) Manasi Joshi (India) Thulasimathi Murugesan	22–20, 21–17	Gold	
2026	Isa Sports City, Manama, Bahrain	(Indonesia) Khalimatus Sadiyah	(China) Xiao Zuxian (China) Yang Qiuxia	19–21, 12–21	Silver	

Mixed doubles

Year	Venue	Partner	Opponent	Score	Result	Ref
2017	Dongchun Gymnasium, Ulsan, South Korea	(Indonesia) Hary Susanto	(China) Yang Jianyuan (China) Yang Qiuxia	21–14, 21–14	Gold	
2019	St. Jakobshalle, Basel, Switzerland	(Indonesia) Hary Susanto	(Germany) Jan-Niklas Pott (Germany) Katrin Seibert	21–4, 21–11	Gold	
2024	Pattaya Exhibition and Convention Hall, Pattaya, Thailand	(Indonesia) Hikmat Ramdani	(Indonesia) Fredy Setiawan (Indonesia) Khalimatus Sadiyah	21–9, 21–16	Gold	
2026	Isa Sports City, Manama, Bahrain	(Indonesia) Hikmat Ramdani	(China) Yang Jianyuan (China) Yang Qiuxia	21–6, 21–15	Gold	

=== World Abilitysport Games ===
Women's singles

Year	Venue	Opponent	Score	Result	Ref
2023	Terminal 21 Korat Hall, Nakhon Ratchasima, Thailand	(Indonesia) Khalimatus Sadiyah	21–12, 21–10	Gold	

Women’s doubles

Year	Venue	Partner	Opponent	Score	Result	Ref
2023 (Note: This tournament uses a round robin system.)	Terminal 21 Korat Hall, Nakhon Ratchasima, Thailand	(Indonesia) Khalimatus Sadiyah	(Indonesia) Qonitah Ikhtiar Syakuroh (Thailand) Wathini Naramitkornburee	21–11, 21–17	Gold	
2023	Terminal 21 Korat Hall, Nakhon Ratchasima, Thailand	(Indonesia) Khalimatus Sadiyah	(India) Amudha Saravanan (India) Riddhi Pradipkumar Thacker	21–6, 21–6	Gold	
2023	Terminal 21 Korat Hall, Nakhon Ratchasima, Thailand	(Indonesia) Khalimatus Sadiyah	(Thailand) Nutvara Patitus (Thailand) Wandee Kamtam	21–7, 21–6	Gold	

Mixed doubles

Year	Venue	Partner	Opponent	Score	Result	Ref
2023	Terminal 21 Korat, Nakhon Ratchasima, Thailand	(Indonesia) Hikmat Ramdani	(Indonesia) Fredy Setiawan (Indonesia) Khalimatus Sadiyah	21–8, 21–19	Gold	

=== Asian Para Games ===
Women's singles

Year	Venue	Opponent	Score	Result	Ref
2014	Gyeyang Gymnasium, Incheon, South Korea	(China) Sun Shouqun	21–15, 9–21, 13–21	Bronze	
2018	Istora Gelora Bung Karno, Jakarta, Indonesia	(China) Cheng Hefang	21–18, 18–21, 13–21	Silver	
2022	Binjiang Gymnasium, Hangzhou, China	(China) Cheng Hefang	21–17, 13–21, 12–21	Silver	
2026	Ichinomiya City Municipal Gymnasium, Ichinomiya, Japan	(China) Cheng Hefang	21–23, 21–13, 17–21	Silver	

Women’s doubles

Year	Venue	Partner	Opponent	Score	Result	Ref
2014 (Note: This tournament uses a round robin system.)	Gyeyang Gymnasium, Incheon, South Korea	(Indonesia) Khalimatus Sadiyah	(Japan) Noriko Ito (Japan) Akiko Sugino	21–17, 18–21, 19–21	Silver	
2014	Gyeyang Gymnasium, Incheon, South Korea	(Indonesia) Khalimatus Sadiyah	(Thailand) Wandee Kamtam (Thailand) Sudsaifon Yodpa	21–8, 21–16	Silver	
2014	Gyeyang Gymnasium, Incheon, South Korea	(Indonesia) Khalimatus Sadiyah	(China) Cheng Hefang (China) Ma Huihui	10–21, 16–21	Silver	
2014	Gyeyang Gymnasium, Incheon, South Korea	(Indonesia) Khalimatus Sadiyah	(Thailand) Nipada Saensupa (Thailand) Chanida Srinavakul	21–10, 21–7	Silver	
2018	Istora Gelora Bung Karno, Jakarta, Indonesia	(Indonesia) Khalimatus Sadiyah	(China) Cheng Hefang (China) Ma Huihui	21–15, 21–12	Gold	
2022	Binjiang Gymnasium, Hangzhou, China	(Indonesia) Khalimatus Sadiyah	(India) Manasi Joshi (India) Thulasimathi Murugesan	21–16, 13–21, 21–14	Gold	
2026	Ichinomiya City Municipal Gymnasium, Ichinomiya, Japan	(Indonesia) Khalimatus Sadiyah	(China) Xiao Zuxian (China) Yang Qiuxia	19–21, 21–19, 17–21	Bronze	

Mixed doubles

Year	Venue	Partner	Opponent	Score	Result	Ref
2014	Gyeyang Gymnasium, Incheon, South Korea	(Indonesia) Fredy Setiawan	(India) Raj Kumar (India) Parul Parmar	21–14, 21–15	Gold	
2018	Istora Gelora Bung Karno, Jakarta, Indonesia	(Indonesia) Hary Susanto	(Thailand) Siripong Teamarrom (Thailand) Nipada Saensupa	21—17, 21–10	Gold	
2022	Binjiang Gymnasium, Hangzhou, China	(Indonesia) Hikmat Ramdani	(Indonesia) Fredy Setiawan (Indonesia) Khalimatus Sadiyah	21—7, 21–8	Gold	
2026	Ichinomiya City Municipal Gymnasium, Ichinomiya, Japan	(Indonesia) Hikmat Ramdani	(India) Kumar Nitesh (India) Thulasimathi Murugesan	11–21, 21–19, 21–14	Gold	

=== ASEAN Para Games ===
Women's singles

Year	Venue	Opponent	Score	Result	Ref
2015	OCBC Arena, Singapore	(Indonesia) Khalimatus Sadiyah	21–12, 21–14	Gold	
2017	Axiata Arena, Kuala Lumpur, Malaysia	(Indonesia) Khalimatus Sadiyah	21–7, 21–12	Gold	
2023 (Note: This tournament uses a round robin system.)	Morodok Techo Badminton Hall, Phnom Penh, Cambodia	(Indonesia) Lia Priyanti	21–6, 21–5	Gold	
2023	Morodok Techo Badminton Hall, Phnom Penh, Cambodia	(Indonesia) Khalimatus Sadiyah	23–21, 21–18	Gold	
2023	Morodok Techo Badminton Hall, Phnom Penh, Cambodia	(Thailand) Chanida Srinavakul	21–8, 21–10	Gold	
2023	Morodok Techo Badminton Hall, Phnom Penh, Cambodia	(Philippines) Ma. Cielo Dimain Honasan	21–7, 21–3	Gold	
2025	SPDAT Convention Center, Nakhon Ratchasima, Thailand	(Indonesia) Khalimatus Sadiyah	21–15, 21–19	Gold	

Women's doubles

Year	Venue	Partner	Opponent	Score	Result	Ref
2015 (Note: This tournament uses a round robin system.)	OCBC Arena, Singapore	(Indonesia) Khalimatus Sadiyah	(Indonesia) Larti (Indonesia) Sriyanti	21–7, 21–14	Gold	
2015	OCBC Arena, Singapore	(Indonesia) Khalimatus Sadiyah	(Thailand) Nipada Saensupa (Thailand) Chanida Srinavakul	21–9, 21–11	Gold	
2015	OCBC Arena, Singapore	(Indonesia) Khalimatus Sadiyah	(Vietnam) Vũ Hoài Thanh (Vietnam) Đoàn Thị Ngãi	21–11, 21–15	Gold	
2015	OCBC Arena, Singapore	(Indonesia) Khalimatus Sadiyah	(Thailand) Wandee Kamtam (Thailand) Sudsaifon Yodpa	21–14, 21–15	Gold	
2017 (Note: This tournament uses a round robin system.)	Axiata Arena, Kuala Lumpur, Malaysia	(Indonesia) Khalimatus Sadiyah	(Malaysia) Nabilah Ahmat Sharif (Malaysia) Nursyazwani Shahrom	21–5, 21–8	Gold	
2017	Axiata Arena, Kuala Lumpur, Malaysia	(Indonesia) Khalimatus Sadiyah	(Thailand) Nipada Saensupa (Thailand) Chanida Srinavakul	21–17, 21–5	Gold	
2017	Axiata Arena, Kuala Lumpur, Malaysia	(Indonesia) Khalimatus Sadiyah	(Vietnam) Nguyễn Thị Hồng Tươi (Vietnam) Vũ Hoài Thanh	21–4, 21–3	Gold	
2017	Axiata Arena, Kuala Lumpur, Malaysia	(Indonesia) Khalimatus Sadiyah	(Thailand) Darunee Henpraiwan (Thailand) Nisa Kaeokhunnok	21–5, 21–6	Gold	
2023 (Note: This tournament uses a round robin system.)	Morodok Techo Badminton Hall, Phnom Penh, Cambodia	(Indonesia) Khalimatus Sadiyah	(Indonesia) Lia Priyanti (Indonesia) Qonitah Ikhtiar Syakuroh	21–6, 21–14	Gold	
2023	Morodok Techo Badminton Hall, Phnom Penh, Cambodia	(Indonesia) Khalimatus Sadiyah	(Thailand) Wandee Kamtam (Thailand) Wathini Naramitkornburee	21–14, 21–5	Gold	
2023	Morodok Techo Badminton Hall, Phnom Penh, Cambodia	(Indonesia) Khalimatus Sadiyah	(Thailand) Chanida Srinavakul (Thailand) Nipada Saensupa	21–16, 21–14	Gold	
2025 (Note: This tournament uses a round robin system.)	SPDAT Convention Center, Nakhon Ratchasima, Thailand	(Indonesia) Khalimatus Sadiyah	(Indonesia) Qonitah Ikhtiar Syakuroh (Indonesia) Warining Rahayu	21–8, 21–15	Gold	
2025	SPDAT Convention Center, Nakhon Ratchasima, Thailand	(Indonesia) Khalimatus Sadiyah	(Thailand) Darunee Henpraiwan (Thailand) Chanida Srinavakul	21–15, 21–12	Gold	
2025	SPDAT Convention Center, Nakhon Ratchasima, Thailand	(Indonesia) Khalimatus Sadiyah	(Philippines) Kathleen Pedrosa (Philippines) Ma Cielo Honasan	21–6, 21–1	Gold	
2025	SPDAT Convention Center, Nakhon Ratchasima, Thailand	(Indonesia) Khalimatus Sadiyah	(Thailand) Wandee Kamtam (Thailand) Nutvara Patitus	walkover	Gold	

Mixed doubles

Year	Venue	Partner	Opponent	Score	Result	Ref
2015	OCBC Arena, Singapore	(Indonesia) Fredy Setiawan	(Thailand) Dachaton Saengrayakul (Thailand) Nipada Saensupa	21–11, 21–11	Gold	
2017	Axiata Arena, Kuala Lumpur, Malaysia	(Indonesia) Hary Susanto	(Indonesia) Fredy Setiawan (Indonesia) Khalimatus Sadiyah	21–11, 21–13	Gold	
2023	Morodok Techo Badminton Hall, Phnom Penh, Cambodia	(Indonesia) Hikmat Ramdani	(Indonesia) Fredy Setiawan (Indonesia) Khalimatus Sadiyah	21–15, 21–19	Gold	
2025	SPDAT Convention Center, Nakhon Ratchasima, Thailand	(Indonesia) Hikmat Ramdani	(Indonesia) Fredy Setiawan (Indonesia) Khalimatus Sadiyah	21–7, 21–4	Gold	

=== BWF Para Badminton World Circuit (39 titles, 10 runners-up) ===
The BWF Para Badminton World Circuit – Grade 2, Level 1, 2 and 3 tournaments has been sanctioned by the Badminton World Federation from 2022.

Women's singles

Year	Tournament	Level	Opponent	Score	Result	Ref
2023	Spanish Para Badminton International	Level 2	(Japan) Haruka Fujino	21–11, 14–21, 21–13	(gold) Winner	
2023	Brazil Para Badminton International	Level 2	(France) Faustine Noël	21–16, 21–11	(gold) Winner	
2023	Thailand Para Badminton International	Level 2	(China) Cheng Hefang	13–21, 18–21	(silver) Runner-up	
2023	Bahrain Para Badminton International	Level 2	(China) Cheng Hefang	20–22, 12–21	(silver) Runner-up	
2023	Indonesia Para Badminton International	Level 3	(India) Vaishnavi Puneyani	22–20, 21–14	(gold) Winner	
2023	Western Australia Para Badminton International	Level 2	(India) Vaishnavi Puneyani	17–21, 18–21	(silver) Runner-up	
2023	Dubai Para Badminton International	Level 2	(China) Cheng Hefang	15–21, 10–21	(silver) Runner-up	
2024	4 Nations Para Badminton International	Level 1	(Norway) Helle Sofie Sagøy	21–18, 21–12	(gold) Winner	
2024	Indonesia Para Badminton International	Level 2	(Indonesia) Warining Rahayu	21–12, 21–12	(gold) Winner	
2024 (Note: This tournament uses a round robin system.)	Bahrain Para Badminton International	Level 1	(Indonesia) Khalimatus Sadiyah	21–15, 21–13	(gold) Winner	
2024	Bahrain Para Badminton International	Level 1	(India) Palak Kohli	21–17, 21–14	(gold) Winner	
2024	Bahrain Para Badminton International	Level 1	(Brazil) Edwarda Dias	21–12, 21–5	(gold) Winner	
2024	Bahrain Para Badminton International	Level 1	(Australia) Zashka Gunson	21–17, 21–8	(gold) Winner	
2025	British & Irish Para Badminton International	Level 1	(Norway) Helle Sofie Sagøy	21–18, 21–15	(gold) Winner	
2026	French Para Badminton International	Level 2	(Turkey) Tuğçe Çelik	21–10, 21–9	(gold) Winner	
2026	British & Irish Para Badminton International	Level 1	(Norway) Helle Sofie Sagøy	21–17, 21–11	(gold) Winner	
2026	China Para Badminton International	Level 2	(China) Cheng Hefang	15–21, 21–12, 21–19	(gold) Winner	
2026	Japan Para Badminton International	Level 2	(Norway) Helle Sofie Sagøy	21–17, 21–14	(gold) Winner	

Women's doubles

Year	Tournament	Level	Partner	Opponent	Score	Result	Ref
2023	Spanish Para Badminton International	Level 2	(Indonesia) Khalimatus Sadiyah	(India) Manasi Joshi (India) Shanthiya Viswanathan	21–9, 21–9	(gold) Winner	
2023	Thailand Para Badminton International	Level 2	(Indonesia) Khalimatus Sadiyah	(China) Xiao Zuxian (China) Yang Qiuxia	16–21, 21–8, 18–21	(silver) Runner-up	
2023	Bahrain Para Badminton International	Level 2	(Indonesia) Khalimatus Sadiyah	(India) Manasi Joshi (India) Thulasimathi Murugesan	21–19, 19–21, 21–10	(gold) Winner	
2023	Canada Para Badminton International	Level 1	(Indonesia) Khalimatus Sadiyah	(India) Manasi Joshi (India) Thulasimathi Murugesan	21–9, 23–25, 22–24	(silver) Runner-up	
2023	4 Nations Para Badminton International	Level 1	(Indonesia) Khalimatus Sadiyah	(India) Manasi Joshi (India) Thulasimathi Murugesan	18–21, 22–20, 12–21	(silver) Runner-up	
2023	Indonesia Para Badminton International	Level 3	(Indonesia) Khalimatus Sadiyah	(Turkey) Tuğçe Çelik (India) Vaishnavi Puneyani	21–18, 21–15	(gold) Winner	
2023	Western Australia Para Badminton International	Level 2	(Indonesia) Khalimatus Sadiyah	(India) Manasi Joshi (India) Thulasimathi Murugesan	22–24, 21–19, 21–17	(gold) Winner	
2023	Japan Para Badminton International	Level 2	(Indonesia) Khalimatus Sadiyah	(India) Manasi Joshi (India) Thulasimathi Murugesan	16–21, 11–21	(silver) Runner-up	
2023	Dubai Para Badminton International	Level 2	(Indonesia) Khalimatus Sadiyah	(India) Manasi Joshi (India) Thulasimathi Murugesan	21–15, 14–21, 6–21	(silver) Runner-up	
2024	Indonesia Para Badminton International	Level 2	(Indonesia) Khalimatus Sadiyah	(Indonesia) Qonitah Ikhtiar Syakuroh (Indonesia) Warining Rahayu	21–8, 21–6	(gold) Winner	
2024 (Note: This tournament uses a round robin system.)	Bahrain Para Badminton International	Level 1	(Indonesia) Khalimatus Sadiyah	(Australia) Zashka Gunson (Australia) Celine Vinot	21–10, 21–7	(gold) Winner	
2024	Bahrain Para Badminton International	Level 1	(Indonesia) Khalimatus Sadiyah	(India) Neeraj (India) Arati Janoba Patil	21–8, 21–4	(gold) Winner	
2024	Bahrain Para Badminton International	Level 1	(Indonesia) Khalimatus Sadiyah	(Brazil) Adriane Spinetti Avila (Italy) Rosa Efomo De Marco	21–2, 21–13	(gold) Winner	
2025	British & Irish Para Badminton International	Level 1	(Indonesia) Khalimatus Sadiyah	(India) Sanjana Kumari (Portugal) Beatriz Monteiro	21–14, 21–7	(gold) Winner	
2026	French Para Badminton International	Level 2	(Indonesia) Khalimatus Sadiyah	(India) Manasi Joshi (India) Thulasimathi Murugesan	21–19, 15–21, 11–21	(silver) Runner-up	
2026	British & Irish Para Badminton International	Level 1	(Indonesia) Khalimatus Sadiyah	(India) Manasi Joshi (India) Thulasimathi Murugesan	21–14, 13–21, 21–17	(gold) Winner	
2026	China Para Badminton International	Level 2	(Indonesia) Khalimatus Sadiyah	(China) Gu Feifei (China) Moshiniu Qiesha	21–13, 21–16	(gold) Winner	
2026	Japan Para Badminton International	Level 2	(Indonesia) Khalimatus Sadiyah	(Brazil) Kauana Michelson Beckenkamp (Brazil) Bruna Danielle Moreira Vasconcellos	22–24, 21–13, 21–7	(gold) Winner	

Mixed doubles

Year	Tournament	Level	Partner	Opponent	Score	Result	Ref
2023	Spanish Para Badminton International	Level 2	(Indonesia) Hikmat Ramdani	(India) Chirag Baretha (India) Mandeep Kaur	21–11, 21–12	(gold) Winner	
2023	Brazil Para Badminton International	Level 2	(Indonesia) Hikmat Ramdani	(India) Kumar Nitesh (India) Thulasimathi Murugesan	21–18, 21–9	(gold) Winner	
2023	Thailand Para Badminton International	Level 2	(Indonesia) Hikmat Ramdani	(France) Lucas Mazur (France) Faustine Noël	21–3, 21–19	(gold) Winner	
2023	Bahrain Para Badminton International	Level 2	(Indonesia) Hikmat Ramdani	(Indonesia) Fredy Setiawan (Indonesia) Khalimatus Sadiyah	21–7, 16–21, 21–15	(gold) Winner	
2023	Canada Para Badminton International	Level 1	(Indonesia) Hikmat Ramdani	(Indonesia) Fredy Setiawan (Indonesia) Khalimatus Sadiyah	21–12, 19–21, 21–12	(gold) Winner	
2023	4 Nations Para Badminton International	Level 1	(Indonesia) Hikmat Ramdani	(India) Pramod Bhagat (India) Manisha Ramadass	21–17, 21–17	(gold) Winner	
2023	Indonesia Para Badminton International	Level 3	(Indonesia) Hikmat Ramdani	(Indonesia) Fredy Setiawan (Indonesia) Khalimatus Sadiyah	21–10, 21–17	(gold) Winner	
2023	Japan Para Badminton International	Level 2	(Indonesia) Hikmat Ramdani	(Indonesia) Fredy Setiawan (Indonesia) Khalimatus Sadiyah	21–15, 21–13	(gold) Winner	
2023	Dubai Para Badminton International	Level 2	(Indonesia) Hikmat Ramdani	(India) Pramod Bhagat (India) Manisha Ramadass	21–14, 21–11	(gold) Winner	
2024	Bahrain Para Badminton International	Level 2	(Indonesia) Fredy Setiawan	(India) Jagdish Dilli (Italy) Rosa Efomo De Marco	21–8, 21–15	(gold) Winner	
2024	4 Nations Para Badminton International	Level 1	(Indonesia) Hikmat Ramdani	(Indonesia) Fredy Setiawan (Indonesia) Khalimatus Sadiyah	21–9, 21–11	(gold) Winner	
2024	Indonesia Para Badminton International	Level 2	(Indonesia) Hikmat Ramdani	(Indonesia) Fredy Setiawan (Indonesia) Khalimatus Sadiyah	21–12, 21–10	(gold) Winner	
2024	Bahrain Para Badminton International	Level 1	(Indonesia) Hikmat Ramdani	(Indonesia) Fredy Setiawan (Indonesia) Khalimatus Sadiyah	21–6, 21–9	(gold) Winner	
2025	Indonesia Para Badminton International	Level 1	(Indonesia) Hikmat Ramdani	(Indonesia) Fredy Setiawan (Indonesia) Khalimatus Sadiyah	21–6, 21–9	(gold) Winner	
2026	French Para Badminton International	Level 2	(Indonesia) Hikmat Ramdani	(India) Pramod Bhagat (India) Manisha Ramadass	walkover	(gold) Winner	
2026	British & Irish Para Badminton International	Level 1	(Indonesia) Hikmat Ramdani	(Indonesia) Fredy Setiawan (Indonesia) Khalimatus Sadiyah	21–4, 21–15	(gold) Winner	
2026	China Para Badminton International	Level 2	(Indonesia) Hikmat Ramdani	(India) Kumar Nitesh (France) Maud Lefort	21–17, 21–14	(gold) Winner	
2026	Japan Para Badminton International	Level 2	(Indonesia) Hikmat Ramdani	(France) Méril Loquette (France) Laureen Marchand	21–19, 21–6	(gold) Winner	

=== International tournaments (35 titles, 6 runners-up) ===
Women's singles

Year	Tournament	Opponent	Score	Result	Ref
2014	Indonesia Para Badminton International	(Indonesia) Khalimatus Sadiyah	21–8, 21–12	(gold) Winner	
2015	Indonesia Para Badminton International	(Indonesia) Khalimatus Sadiyah	21–8, 21–10	(gold) Winner	
2016	Indonesia Para Badminton International	(Japan) Ayako Suzuki	15–21, 8–21	(silver) Runner-up	
2017	Thailand Para Badminton International	(Thailand) Nipada Saensupa	21–11, 21–8	(gold) Winner	
2018	Dubai Para Badminton International	(Turkey) Zehra Bağlar	21–11, 21–7	(gold) Winner	
2018	Irish Para Badminton International	(Norway) Helle Sofie Sagøy	21–8, 21–10	(gold) Winner	
2018	Thailand Para Badminton International	(France) Faustine Noël	21–2, 21–12	(gold) Winner	
2018	Australia Para Badminton International	(Japan) Ayako Suzuki	17–21, 18–21	(silver) Runner-up	
2019	Turkish Para Badminton International	(China) Ma Huihui	21–17, 21–16	(gold) Winner	
2019	Dubai Para Badminton International	(China) Cheng Hefang	15–21, 15–21	(silver) Runner-up	
2019	Canada Para Badminton International	(Japan) Haruka Fujino	21–12, 21–12	(gold) Winner	
2019	Irish Para Badminton International	(Norway) Helle Sofie Sagøy	14–21, 21–12, 21–11	(gold) Winner	
2020	Brazil Para Badminton International	(China) Cheng Hefang	16–21, 21–16, 14–21	(silver) Runner-up	
2021 (Note: This tournament uses a round robin system.)	Dubai Para Badminton International	(France) Faustine Noël	21–17, 21–11	(gold) Winner	
2021	Dubai Para Badminton International	(Netherlands) Sophie van den Broek	21–4, 21–5	(gold) Winner	
2021	Dubai Para Badminton International	(Norway) Helle Sofie Sagøy	21–11, 21–17	(gold) Winner	
2021	Dubai Para Badminton International	(United Arab Emirates) Salama Al Khateri	21–1, 21–6	(gold) Winner	

Women's doubles

Year	Tournament	Partner	Opponent	Score	Result	Ref
2014	Indonesia Para Badminton International	(Indonesia) Khalimatus Sadiyah	(Thailand) Nipada Saensupa (Thailand) Chanida Srinavakul	21–13, 21–16	(gold) Winner	
2015	Indonesia Para Badminton International	(Indonesia) Khalimatus Sadiyah	(Thailand) Wandee Kamtam (Japan) Mamiko Toyoda	21–7, 21–19	(gold) Winner	
2016	Indonesia Para Badminton International	(Indonesia) Khalimatus Sadiyah	(Thailand) Nipada Saensupa (Thailand) Chanida Srinavakul	21–19, 21–14	(gold) Winner	
2017	Thailand Para Badminton International	(Thailand) Wandee Kamtam	(Japan) Mamiko Toyoda (Japan) Asami Yamada	21–13, 21–13	(gold) Winner	
2018	Dubai Para Badminton International	(France) Faustine Noël	(Turkey) Zehra Bağlar (India) Manasi Joshi	21–17, 21–7	(gold) Winner	
2018	Irish Para Badminton International	(Indonesia) Khalimatus Sadiyah	(Norway) Helle Sofie Sagøy (Germany) Katrin Seibert	21–16, 21–9	(gold) Winner	
2018	Thailand Para Badminton International	(Indonesia) Khalimatus Sadiyah	(Thailand) Nipada Saensupa (Thailand) Chanida Srinavakul	21–9, 21–8	(gold) Winner	
2018	Australia Para Badminton International	(Indonesia) Khalimatus Sadiyah	(Japan) Noriko Ito (Japan) Ayako Suzuki	21–12, 21–14	(gold) Winner	
2019	Dubai Para Badminton International	(Indonesia) Khalimatus Sadiyah	(China) Cheng Hefang (China) Ma Huihui	8–21, 21–12, 21–16	(gold) Winner	
2019	Canada Para Badminton International	(Indonesia) Khalimatus Sadiyah	(Japan) Noriko Ito (Japan) Ayako Suzuki	21–13, 21–18	(gold) Winner	
2019	Irish Para Badminton International	(Indonesia) Khalimatus Sadiyah	(France) Lénaïg Morin (France) Faustine Noël	21–11, 21–18	(gold) Winner	
2020	Brazil Para Badminton International	(Indonesia) Khalimatus Sadiyah	(China) Cheng Hefang (China) Ma Huihui	21–15, 21–19	(gold) Winner	
2021	Dubai Para Badminton International	(Indonesia) Khalimatus Sadiyah	(France) Lénaïg Morin (France) Faustine Noël	21–15, 21–16	(gold) Winner	

Mixed doubles

Year	Tournament	Partner	Opponent	Score	Result	Ref
2014	Indonesia Para Badminton International	(Indonesia) Fredy Setiawan	(Indonesia) Suryo Nugroho (Indonesia) Khalimatus Sadiyah	19–21, 17–21	(silver) Runner-up	
2015	Indonesia Para Badminton International	(Indonesia) Fredy Setiawan	(Indonesia) Arya Sadewa (Indonesia) Sriyanti	21–9, 21–7	(gold) Winner	
2016	Indonesia Para Badminton International	(Indonesia) Fredy Setiawan	(Indonesia) Hary Susanto (Indonesia) Khalimatus Sadiyah	21–13, 21–16	(gold) Winner	
2017	Thailand Para Badminton International	(Indonesia) Hary Susanto	(France) Lucas Mazur (France) Faustine Noël	21–7, 21–11	(gold) Winner	
2018	Dubai Para Badminton International	(Indonesia) Hary Susanto	(France) Lucas Mazur (France) Faustine Noël	21–18, 21–18	(gold) Winner	
2018	Irish Para Badminton International	(Indonesia) Hary Susanto	(Indonesia) Fredy Setiawan (Indonesia) Khalimatus Sadiyah	21–5, 21–15	(gold) Winner	
2018	Thailand Para Badminton International	(Indonesia) Hary Susanto	(Indonesia) Fredy Setiawan (Indonesia) Khalimatus Sadiyah	21–5, 21–10	(gold) Winner	
2018	Australia Para Badminton International	(Indonesia) Dwiyoko	(France) Guillaume Gailly (France) Veronique Braud	19–21, 21–8, 21–10	(gold) Winner	
2019	Turkish Para Badminton International	(Indonesia) Hary Susanto	(China) Ou Wei (China) Cheng Hefang	21–9, 21–13	(gold) Winner	
2019	Dubai Para Badminton International	(Indonesia) Hary Susanto	(France) Lucas Mazur (France) Faustine Noël	21–19, 21–15	(gold) Winner	
2019	Canada Para Badminton International	(Indonesia) Hary Susanto	(France) Lucas Mazur (France) Faustine Noël	21–16, 15–21, 21–13	(gold) Winner	
2019	Irish Para Badminton International	(Indonesia) Hary Susanto	(France) Lucas Mazur (France) Faustine Noël	16–21, 21–16, 21–10	(gold) Winner	
2020	Brazil Para Badminton International	(Indonesia) Hary Susanto	(France) Lucas Mazur (France) Faustine Noël	21–16, 21–9	(gold) Winner	
2021	Dubai Para Badminton International	(Indonesia) Hary Susanto	(France) Lucas Mazur (France) Faustine Noël	12–21, 21–19, 19–21	(silver) Runner-up	

== Performance timeline ==
Key

W	F	SF	QF	#R	RR	Q#	A	G	S	B	NH	N/A	DNQ

(W) won; (F) finalist; (SF) semi-finalist; (QF) quarter-finalist; (#R) rounds 4, 3, 2, 1; (RR) round-robin stage; (Q#) qualification round; (A) absent; (G) gold, (S) silver or (B) bronze medal; (NH) not held; (N/A) not applicable; (DNQ) did not qualify.
To avoid confusion and double counting, these charts are updated at the conclusion of a tournament or when the player's participation has ended.

=== Individual competitions ===
==== Senior level ====
===== Women's singles SL4 =====
Events	2014	2015	2016	2017	2018	2019	2020	2021	2022	2023	2024
Asian Para Games	B	NH			S	NH			S	NH	
World Abilitysport Games	NH	A	NH	A	NH	A	NH		A	G	
World Championships	NH	A	NH	S	NH	G	NH		A	NH	S
Paralympic Games	NH						S	NH			S

Tournament	International Tournaments									World Circuit		Best
Tournament	2014	2015	2016	2017	2018	2019	2020	2021	2022	2023	2024	Best
Spanish Para Badminton International - 2	NH	A	NH	A		NH		A		W		W ('23)
Brazil Para Badminton International	NH			A		NH	F	NH	A	W		W ('23)
Thailand Para Badminton International	NH			W	W	A	NH		A	F		W ('17, '18)
Bahrain Para Badminton International	NH								A	F	SF	F ('23)
Canada Para Badminton International	NH					W	NH		A	QF	NH	W ('19)
4 Nations Para Badminton International	NH								A	SF	W	W ('24)
Indonesia Para Badminton International	W	W	F	NH					A	W	W	W ('14, '15, '23, '24)
Western Australia Para Badminton International	NH									F		F ('23)
Japan Para Badminton International	NH						NH			SF		SF ('23)
Dubai Para Badminton International	NH				W	F	NH	W	A	F		W ('18, '21)
Australia Para Badminton International	NH				F	NH						F ('18)
Irish Para Badminton International	NH	A			W	W	NH					W ('18, '19)
Turkish Para Badminton International	NH		A			W	NH					W ('19)

===== Women's doubles SL3–SU5 =====
Events	2014	2015	2016	2017	2018	2019	2020	2021	2022	2023	2024
Asian Para Games	S	NH			G	NH			G	NH	
World Abilitysport Games	NH	A	NH	A	NH	A	NH		A	G	
World Championships	NH	A	NH	B	NH	S	NH		G	NH	G
Paralympic Games	NH						G	NH			

Tournament	International Tournaments									World Circuit		Best
Tournament	2014	2015	2016	2017	2018	2019	2020	2021	2022	2023	2024	Best
Spanish Para Badminton International - 2	NH	A	NH	A		NH		A		W		W ('23)
Brazil Para Badminton International	NH			A		NH	W	NH	A			W ('20)
Thailand Para Badminton International	NH			W	W	A	NH		A	F		W ('17, '18)
Bahrain Para Badminton International	NH								A	W	NH	W ('23)
Canada Para Badminton International	NH					W	NH		A	F	NH	W ('19)
4 Nations Para Badminton International	NH								A	F	NH	F ('23)
Indonesia Para Badminton International	W	W	W	NH					A	W	W	W ('14, '15, '16, '23. '24)
Western Australia Para Badminton International	NH									W		W ('23)
Japan Para Badminton International	NH						NH			F		F ('23)
Dubai Para Badminton International	NH				W	W	NH	W	A	F		W ('18, '19, '21)
Australia Para Badminton International	NH				W	NH						W ('18)
Irish Para Badminton International	NH	A			W	W	NH					W ('18, '19)
Turkish Para Badminton International	NH		A			SF	NH					SF ('19)

===== Mixed doubles SL3–SU5 =====
Events	2014	2015	2016	2017	2018	2019	2020	2021	2022	2023	2024
Asian Para Games	G	NH			G	NH			G	NH	
World Abilitysport Games	NH	A	NH	A	NH	A	NH		A	G	
World Championships	NH	A	NH	G	NH	G	NH		QF	NH	G
Paralympic Games	NH						G	NH			G

Tournament	International Tournaments									World Circuit		Best
Tournament	2014	2015	2016	2017	2018	2019	2020	2021	2022	2023	2024	Best
Spanish Para Badminton International - 2	NH	A	NH	A		NH		A		W		W ('23)
Brazil Para Badminton International	NH			A		NH	W	NH	A	W		W ('20, '23)
Thailand Para Badminton International	NH			W	W	A	NH		A	W		W ('17, '18, '23)
Bahrain Para Badminton International	NH								A	W	W	W ('23, '24)
Canada Para Badminton International	NH					W	NH		A	W	NH	W ('19, '23)
4 Nations Para Badminton International	NH								A	W	W	W ('23, '24)
Indonesia Para Badminton International	F	W	W	NH					A	W	W	W ('15, '16, '23, '24)
Western Australia Para Badminton International	NH									QF		QF ('23)
Japan Para Badminton International	NH						NH			W		W ('23)
Dubai Para Badminton International	NH				W	W	NH	F	A	W		W ('18, '19, '23)
Irish Para Badminton International	NH	A			W	W	NH					W ('18, '19)
Turkish Para Badminton International	NH		A			W	NH					W ('19)

== Awards and nominations ==
Award	Year	Category	Result	Ref.
Asian Awards	2021	Best Female Athlete	Nominated	
BWF Awards	2018	BWF Best Para Badminton Female Player of the Year	Won	
BWF Awards	2019	BWF Best Para Badminton Female Player of the Year	Won	
BWF Awards	2020/2021	BWF Best Para Badminton Female Player of the Year	Won	
BWF Awards	2020/2021	BWF Para Badminton Pair of The Year with Hary Susanto	Nominated	
Golden Award SIWO PWI	2019	Best Female Para Athlete	Nominated	
Golden Award SIWO PWI	2019	Favorite Female Para Athlete	Nominated	
Golden Award SIWO PWI	2021	Best Female Para Athlete	Won	
Indonesian Sport Awards	2018	Favorite Female Para Athlete Pairs with Khalimatus Sadiyah	Won	
Line Today Choice	2021	Most Favorite Indonesian Athlete	Nominated	
Paralympic Awards	2021	Best Female Debut	Nominated	
