= Lucas Mazur =

French para badminton player

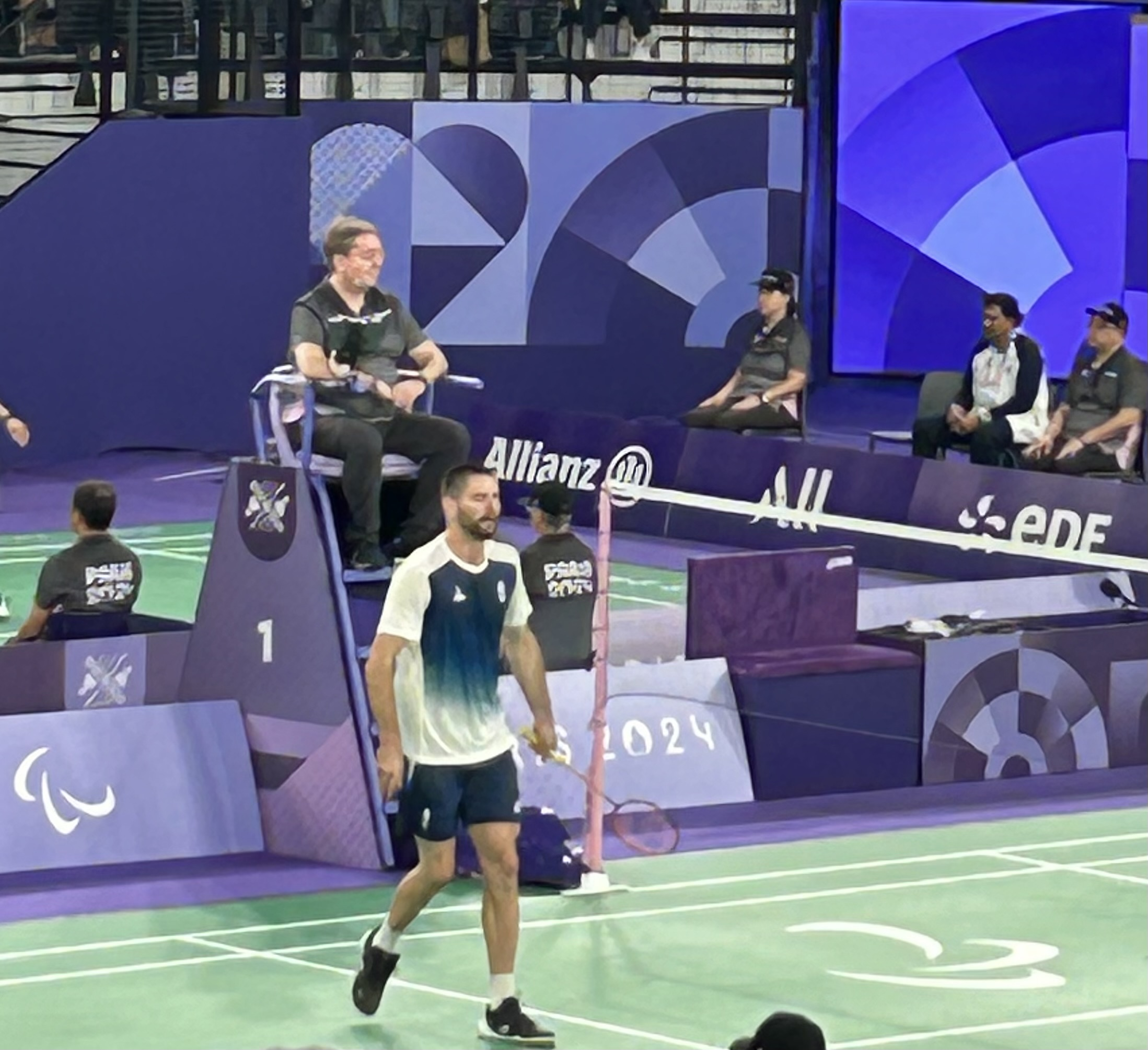
- Mazur at the 2024 Summer Paralympics

Personal information
- Born: 18 November 1997 (age 28) Salbris, France
- Height: 6 ft 3 in (191 cm)

Sport
- Country: France
- Sport: Badminton

Men's singles SL4 Men's doubles SL3–SU5 Mixed doubles SL3–SU5
- Highest ranking: 1 (MS 1 January 2019); 4 (MD with Méril Loquette 1 January 2019); 1 (XD with Faustine Noël 23 August 2022)
- Current ranking: 2 (MS); 20 (MD with Méril Loquette); 4 (XD with Faustine Noël) (3 September 2024)
Medal record
Para-badminton
Representing France
Paralympic Games
Gold medal – first place	2020 Tokyo	Men's singles
Gold medal – first place	2024 Paris	Men's singles
Silver medal – second place	2020 Tokyo	Mixed doubles
Bronze medal – third place	2024 Paris	Mixed doubles
World Championships
Gold medal – first place	2017 Ulsan	Men's singles
Gold medal – first place	2019 Basel	Men's singles
Gold medal – first place	2022 Tokyo	Men's singles
Gold medal – first place	2026 Manama	Men's singles
Silver medal – second place	2015 Stoke Mandeville	Men's singles
Bronze medal – third place	2022 Tokyo	Mixed doubles
Bronze medal – third place	2024 Pattaya	Men's singles
European Para Championships
Gold medal – first place	2023 Rotterdam	Men's singles
Gold medal – first place	2023 Rotterdam	Men's doubles
Gold medal – first place	2023 Rotterdam	Mixed doubles
European Championships
Gold medal – first place	2014 Murcia	Men's singles
Gold medal – first place	2016 Beek	Men's singles
Gold medal – first place	2016 Beek	Men's doubles
Gold medal – first place	2016 Beek	Mixed doubles
Gold medal – first place	2018 Rodez	Men's singles
Gold medal – first place	2018 Rodez	Mixed doubles
Silver medal – second place	2018 Rodez	Men's doubles
Bronze medal – third place	2014 Murcia	Men's doubles

Lucas Mazur (born 18 November 1997) is a French para-badminton player who competes in international level events. He was the gold medalists in the men's singles SL4 at the 2020 and 2024 Summer Paralympics. He was three-time gold medalists in the World Championships winning the title in 2017, 2019, and 2022.

== Early life ==
At the age of three, he suffered a stroke, which led to a deformity in his ankle. He started playing badminton when he was 12.

== Achievements ==
=== Paralympic Games ===
Men's singles SL4

Year	Venue	Opponent	Score	Result
2020	Yoyogi National Gymnasium, Tokyo, Japan	(India) Suhas Lalinakere Yathiraj	15–21, 21–17, 21–15	Gold
2024	Porte de La Chapelle Arena, Paris, France	(India) Suhas Lalinakere Yathiraj	21–9, 21–13	Gold

Mixed doubles SL3–SU5

Year	Venue	Partner	Opponent	Score	Result
2020	Yoyogi National Gymnasium, Tokyo, Japan	(France) Faustine Noël	(Indonesia) Hary Susanto (Indonesia) Leani Ratri Oktila	21–23, 17–21	Silver
2024	Porte de La Chapelle Arena, Paris, France	(France) Faustine Noël	(Thailand) Siripong Teamarrom (Thailand) Nipada Saensupa	21–14, 21–16	Bronze

=== World Championships ===
Men's singles SL4

Year	Venue	Opponent	Score	Result
2015	Stoke Mandeville Stadium, Stoke Mandeville, England	(India) Tarun Dhillon	21–18, 10–21, 15–21	Silver
2017	Dongchun Gymnasium, Ulsan, South Korea	(India) Tarun Dhillon	21–18, 21–10	Gold
2019	St. Jakobshalle, Basel, Switzerland	(India) Tarun Dhillon	13–14^{r}	Gold
2022	Yoyogi National Gymnasium, Tokyo, Japan	(Indonesia) Fredy Setiawan	21–12, 21–17	Gold
2024	Pattaya Exhibition and Convention Hall, Pattaya, Thailand	(India) Suhas Lalinakere Yathiraj	16–21, 19–21	Bronze
2026	Isa Sports City, Manama, Bahrain	(India) Naveen Sivakumar	21–12, 19–21, 21–14	Gold

Mixed doubles SL3–SU5

Year	Venue	Partner	Opponent	Score	Result
2022	Yoyogi National Gymnasium, Tokyo, Japan	(France) Faustine Noël	(Thailand) Siripong Teamarrom (Thailand) Nipada Saensupa	19–21, 19–21	Bronze

=== European Para Championships ===
Men's singles SL4

Year	Venue	Opponent	Score	Result
2023	Rotterdam Ahoy, Rotterdam, Netherlands	(France) Faustine Noël	21–6, 21–6	Gold

Men's doubles SU5

Year	Venue	Partner	Opponent	Score	Result
2023	Rotterdam Ahoy, Rotterdam, Netherlands	(France) Méril Loquette	(Poland) Bartłomiej Mróz (United Kingdom) Jack Wilson	21–17, 21–15	Gold

Mixed doubles SL3–SU5

Year	Venue	Partner	Opponent	Score	Result
2023	Rotterdam Ahoy, Rotterdam, Netherlands	(France) Faustine Noël	(Sweden) Rickard Nilsson (Norway) Helle Sofie Sagøy	21–14, 21–14	Gold

=== European Championships ===
Men's singles SL4

Year	Venue	Opponent	Score	Result
2014	High Performance Center, Murcia, Spain	(England) Antony Forster	21–14, 21–18	Gold
2016	Sporthal de Haamen, Beek, Netherlands	(Sweden) Rickard Nilsson	21–14, 21–6	Gold
2018	Amphitheatre Gymnasium, Rodez, France	(Sweden) Rickard Nilsson	21–7, 21–9	Gold

Men's doubles SL3–SU5

Year	Venue	Partner	Opponent	Score	Result
2014	High Performance Center, Murcia, Spain	(France) Geoffrey Byzery	(England) Daniel Lee (Scotland) Colin Leslie	16–21, 21–15, 15–21	Silver
2016	Sporthal de Haamen, Beek, Netherlands	(France) Mathieu Thomas	(Germany) Marcel Adam (Spain) Simón Cruz Mondejar	21–13, 21–10	Gold
2018	Amphitheatre Gymnasium, Rodez, France	(France) Méril Loquette	(Poland) Bartłomiej Mróz (Turkey) İlker Tuzcu	19–21, 23–25	Bronze

Mixed doubles SL3–SU5

Year	Venue	Partner	Opponent	Score	Result
2016	Sporthal de Haamen, Beek, Netherlands	(France) Faustine Noël	(France) Geoffrey Byzery (Denmark) Cathrine Rosengren	21–7, 21–14	Gold
2018	Amphitheatre Gymnasium, Rodez, France	(France) Faustine Noël	(Germany) Marcel Adam (Germany) Katrin Seibert	21–19, 21–10	Gold

=== BWF Para Badminton World Circuit (10 titles, 2 runners-up) ===
The BWF Para Badminton World Circuit – Grade 2, Level 1, 2 and 3 tournaments has been sanctioned by the Badminton World Federation from 2022.

Men's singles SL4

Year	Tournament	Level	Opponent	Score	Result
2022	Spanish Para-Badminton International	Level 1	(India) Tarun Dhillon	21–7, 21–9	(gold) Winner
2022	4 Nations Para-Badminton International	Level 1	(Germany) Marcel Adam	21–4, 21–10	(gold) Winner
2023	Spanish Para-Badminton International I	Level 1	(Indonesia) Fredy Setiawan	24–22, 21–12	(gold) Winner
2023	Brazil Para-Badminton International	Level 2	(India) Tarun Dhillon	21–7, 21–13	(gold) Winner
2023	Canada Para-Badminton International	Level 1	(India) Tarun Dhillon	21–9, 21–13	(gold) Winner
2023	4 Nations Para-Badminton International	Level 1	(Indonesia) Fredy Setiawan	21–12, 23–21	(gold) Winner
2024	Spanish Para-Badminton International I	Level 1	(India) Suhas Lalinakere Yathiraj	21–18, 21–6	(gold) Winner
2024	4 Nations Para-Badminton International	Level 1	(India) Suhas Lalinakere Yathiraj	21–7, 21–11	(gold) Winner

Men's doubles SU5

Year	Tournament	Level	Partner	Opponent	Score	Result
2022	Thailand Para-Badminton International	Level 1	(France) Méril Loquette	(Malaysia) Cheah Liek Hou (Malaysia) Mohamad Faris Ahmad Azri	12–21, 16–21	(silver) Runner-up
2022	Thailand Para-Badminton International	Level 1	(France) Méril Loquette	(Chinese Taipei) Fang Jen-yu (Chinese Taipei) Pu Gui-yu	21–14, 21–16	(silver) Runner-up
2022	Thailand Para-Badminton International	Level 1	(France) Méril Loquette	(Thailand) Pricha Somsiri (Thailand) Chok-Uthaikul Watcharaphon	20–22, 21–18, 23–21	(silver) Runner-up
2022	Thailand Para-Badminton International	Level 1	(France) Méril Loquette	(South Korea) Kim Gi-yeon (South Korea) Lee Jeong-soo	21–9, 21–6	(silver) Runner-up

Mixed doubles SL3–SU5

Year	Tournament	Level	Partner	Opponent	Score	Result
2022	4 Nations Para-Badminton International	Level 1	(France) Faustine Noël	(India) Chirag Baretha (India) Mandeep Kaur	21–14, 21–18	(gold) Winner
2023	Spanish Para-Badminton International I	Level 1	(France) Faustine Noël	(France) Méril Loquette (France) Coraline Bergeron	21–17, 21–14	(gold) Winner
2023	Thailand Para-Badminton International	Level 2	(France) Faustine Noël	(Indonesia) Hikmat Ramdani (Indonesia) Leani Ratri Oktila	3–21, 19–21	(silver) Runner-up
2024	Spanish Para-Badminton International I	Level 1	(France) Faustine Noël	(India) Kumar Nitesh (India) Thulasimathi Murugesan	20–22, 15–21	(silver) Runner-up

=== International tournaments (2011–2021) (29 titles, 20 runners-up) ===
Men's singles SL4

Year	Tournament	Opponent	Score	Result
2015	Spanish Para-Badminton International	(Malaysia) Bakri Omar	16–21, 14–21	(silver) Runner-up
2015	China Para-Badminton International	(Malaysia) Bakri Omar	21–16, 21–8	(gold) Winner
2015	Irish Para-Badminton International	(Germany) Tim Haller	21–18, 18–21, 21–9	(gold) Winner
2016	Turkish Para-Badminton International	(Turkey) Sedat Tümkaya	21–12, 21–7	(gold) Winner
2016	Irish Para-Badminton International	(Malaysia) Bakri Omar	21–15, 21–14	(gold) Winner
2016	Indonesia Para-Badminton International	(Indonesia) Fredy Setiawan	21–19, 16–21, 19–21	(silver) Runner-up
2017	Spanish Para-Badminton International	(Malaysia) Bakri Omar	21–17, 21–6	(gold) Winner
2017	Thailand Para-Badminton International	(Indonesia) Fredy Setiawan	21–12, 15–21, 10–21	(silver) Runner-up
2017	Irish Para-Badminton International	(Thailand) Siripong Teamarrom	21–19, 21–17	(gold) Winner
2017	Japan Para-Badminton International	(India) Suhas Lalinakere Yathiraj	21–14, 14–21, 21–15	(gold) Winner
2018	Dubai Para-Badminton International	(India) Sukant Kadam	21–16, 21–18	(gold) Winner
2018	Turkish Para-Badminton International	(India) Suhas Lalinakere Yathiraj	21–10, 21–19	(gold) Winner
2018	Thailand Para-Badminton International	(South Korea) Shin Kyung-hwan	21–11, 21–17	(gold) Winner
2018	Japan Para-Badminton International	(India) Sukant Kadam	21–10, 21–17	(gold) Winner
2019	Turkish Para-Badminton International	(India) Suhas Lalinakere Yathiraj	16–21, 20–22	(silver) Runner-up
2019	Dubai Para-Badminton International	(India) Tarun Dhillon	21–13, 21–17	(silver) Runner-up
2019	Canada Para-Badminton International	(India) Tarun Dhillon	18–21, 21–19, 17–21	(silver) Runner-up
2019	Irish Para-Badminton International	(India) Suhas Lalinakere Yathiraj	21–19, 21–17	(gold) Winner
2019	Thailand Para-Badminton International	(South Korea) Shin Kyung-hwan	21–7, 21–6	(gold) Winner
2019	China Para-Badminton International	(Indonesia) Fredy Setiawan	21–14, 21–7	(gold) Winner
2019	Denmark Para-Badminton International	(Indonesia) Fredy Setiawan	17–21, 16–21	(silver) Runner-up
2019	Japan Para-Badminton International	(Thailand) Siripong Teamarrom	21–9, 21–8	(gold) Winner
2020	Brazil Para-Badminton International	(India) Suhas Lalinakere Yathiraj	21–9, 16–21, 19–21	(silver) Runner-up
2021	Dubai Para-Badminton International	(India) Sukant Kadam	21–15, 21–6	(gold) Winner
2021	Spanish Para-Badminton International	(Russia) Pavel Kulikov	21–13, 21–8	(gold) Winner

Men's doubles SU5

Year	Tournament	Partner	Opponent	Score	Result
2015	Irish Para-Badminton International	(France) Mathieu Thomas	(England) Daniel Bethell (England) Bobby Griffin	22–20, 21–17	(gold) Winner
2016	Irish Para-Badminton International	(France) Mathieu Thomas	(Malaysia) Bakri Omar (Malaysia) Muhammad Huzairi Abdul Malek	21–17, 21–14	(gold) Winner
2017	Spanish Para-Badminton International	(France) Mathieu Thomas	(England) Daniel Bethell (England) Bobby Griffin	14–21, 16–21	(silver) Runner-up
2017	Irish Para-Badminton International	(France) Mathieu Thomas	(Germany) Jan-Niklas Pott (Germany) Pascal Wolter	21–15, 22–20	(gold) Winner
2017	Japan Para-Badminton International	(France) Mathieu Thomas	(England) Daniel Bethell (England) Bobby Griffin	16–21, 16–21	(silver) Runner-up
2018	Japan Para-Badminton International	(France) Méril Loquette	(Thailand) Pricha Somsiri (Thailand) Chok-Uthaikul Watcharaphon	20–22, 22–20, 15–21	(silver) Runner-up
2020	Peru Para-Badminton International	(France) Méril Loquette	(India) Raj Kumar (India) Rakesh Pandey	18–21, 21–18, 16–21	(silver) Runner-up
2021	Dubai Para-Badminton International	(France) Méril Loquette	(Indonesia) Suryo Nugroho (Indonesia) Fredy Setiawan	21–19, 13–21, 21–19	(gold) Winner
2021	Spanish Para-Badminton International	(France) Abdoullah Ait Bella	(Russia) Oleg Dontsov (Russia) Pavel Kulikov	21–18, 17–21, 21–14	(gold) Winner

Mixed doubles SL3–SU5

Year	Tournament	Partner	Opponent	Score	Result
2016	Turkish Para-Badminton International	(France) Faustine Noël	(England) Bobby Griffin (Norway) Helle Sofie Sagøy	21–8, 21–10	(gold) Winner
2016	Irish Para-Badminton International	(France) Faustine Noël	(Germany) Jan-Niklas Pott (Norway) Helle Sofie Sagøy	21–17, 21–8	(gold) Winner
2017	Thailand Para-Badminton International	(France) Faustine Noël	(Indonesia) Hary Susanto (Indonesia) Leani Ratri Oktila	7–21, 11–21	(silver) Runner-up
2017	Irish Para-Badminton International	(France) Faustine Noël	(China) Ou Wei (China) Cheng Hefang	21–13, 18–21, 13–21	(silver) Runner-up
2018	Dubai Para-Badminton International	(France) Faustine Noël	(Indonesia) Hary Susanto (Indonesia) Leani Ratri Oktila	18–21, 18–21	(silver) Runner-up
2019	Dubai Para-Badminton International	(France) Faustine Noël	(Indonesia) Hary Susanto (Indonesia) Leani Ratri Oktila	19–21, 15–21	(silver) Runner-up
2019	Canada Para-Badminton International	(France) Faustine Noël	(Indonesia) Hary Susanto (Indonesia) Leani Ratri Oktila	16–21, 21–15, 13–21	(silver) Runner-up
2019	Irish Para-Badminton International	(France) Faustine Noël	(Indonesia) Hary Susanto (Indonesia) Leani Ratri Oktila	21–16, 16–21, 10–21	(silver) Runner-up
2019	Thailand Para-Badminton International	(France) Faustine Noël	(Thailand) Siripong Teamarrom (Thailand) Nipada Saensupa	21–18, 21–19	(gold) Winner
2019	Denmark Para-Badminton International	(France) Faustine Noël	(Thailand) Siripong Teamarrom (Thailand) Nipada Saensupa	18–21, 21–12, 21–18	(gold) Winner
2019	Japan Para-Badminton International	(France) Faustine Noël	(Turkey) İlker Tuzcu (Turkey) Halime Yıldız	21–16, 21–15	(gold) Winner
2020	Brazil Para-Badminton International	(France) Faustine Noël	(Indonesia) Hary Susanto (Indonesia) Leani Ratri Oktila	16–21, 9–21	(silver) Runner-up
2020	Peru Para-Badminton International	(France) Faustine Noël	(Thailand) Siripong Teamarrom (Thailand) Nipada Saensupa	17–21, 25–23, 15–21	(silver) Runner-up
2021	Dubai Para-Badminton International	(France) Faustine Noël	(Indonesia) Hary Susanto (Indonesia) Leani Ratri Oktila	21–12, 19–21, 21–19	(gold) Winner
2021	Spanish Para-Badminton International	(France) Faustine Noël	(Japan) Daisuke Fujihara (Japan) Akiko Sugino	21–12, 21–8	(gold) Winner
