= Hikmat Ramdani =

Indonesian para-badminton player (born 2001)

Personal information
- Born: 25 March 2001 (age 25) Tasikmalaya, West Java, Indonesia

Sport
- Country: Indonesia
- Sport: Badminton

Men's singles SL4 Men's doubles SL3–SL4
- Highest ranking: 12 (MS 1 January 2019); 9 (MD with Ukun Rukaendi 8 November 2022)
- Current ranking: 15 (MS); 9 (MD with Ukun Rukaendi) (8 November 2022)
- BWF profile
Medal record
Men's para-badminton
Representing Indonesia
Paralympic Games
| Gold medal – first place | 2024 Paris | Mixed doubles |
World Championships
| Gold medal – first place | 2022 Tokyo | Men's doubles |
| Gold medal – first place | 2024 Pattaya | Mixed doubles |
| Gold medal – first place | 2026 Manama | Mixed doubles |
| Bronze medal – third place | 2022 Tokyo | Men's singles |
World Abilitysport Games
| Gold medal – first place | 2023 Nakhon Ratchasima | Mixed doubles |
| Silver medal – second place | 2023 Nakhon Ratchasima | Men's singles |
Asian Para Games
| Gold medal – first place | 2022 Hangzhou | Mixed doubles |
| Gold medal – first place | 2026 Aichi–Nagoya | Mixed doubles |
| Bronze medal – third place | 2018 Jakarta | Men's singles |
| Bronze medal – third place | 2018 Jakarta | Mixed doubles |
ASEAN Para Games
| Gold medal – first place | 2023 Cambodia | Mixed doubles |
| Gold medal – first place | 2025 Nakhon Ratchasima | Men's singles |
| Gold medal – first place | 2025 Nakhon Ratchasima | Mixed doubles |
| Silver medal – second place | 2022 Surakarta | Men's singles |
| Silver medal – second place | 2023 Cambodia | Men's singles |
| Silver medal – second place | 2025 Nakhon Ratchasima | Men's doubles |
Asian Youth Para Games
| Gold medal – first place | 2017 Dubai | Boys' singles |
| Gold medal – first place | 2017 Dubai | Mixed doubles |
| Gold medal – first place | 2021 Manama | Boys' singles |
| Gold medal – first place | 2021 Manama | Mixed doubles |

Hikmat Ramdani (born 25 March 2001) is an Indonesian para-badminton player. He won the gold medal in the men's doubles SL3–SL4 at the 2022 BWF Para-Badminton World Championships with partner Ukun Rukaendi.

In the junior event, Ramdani won the gold medals in the boys' singles and mixed doubles at the 2017 and 2021 Asian Youth Para Games.

== Achievements ==
=== Paralympic Games ===
Mixed doubles

| Year | Venue | Partner | Opponent | Score | Result |
|---|---|---|---|---|---|
| 2024 | Arena Porte de La Chapelle, Paris, France | (Indonesia) Leani Ratri Oktila | (Indonesia) Fredy Setiawan (Indonesia) Khalimatus Sadiyah | 21–16, 21–15 | Gold |

=== World Championships ===
Men's singles

| Year | Venue | Opponent | Score | Result |
|---|---|---|---|---|
| 2022 | Yoyogi National Gymnasium, Tokyo, Japan | (France) Lucas Mazur | 11–21, 11–21 | Bronze |

Men's doubles

| Year | Venue | Partner | Opponent | Score | Result |
|---|---|---|---|---|---|
| 2022 | Yoyogi National Gymnasium, Tokyo, Japan | (Indonesia) Ukun Rukaendi | (India) Pramod Bhagat (India) Manoj Sarkar | 14–21, 21–18, 21–13 | Gold |

Mixed doubles

| Year | Venue | Partner | Opponent | Score | Result |
|---|---|---|---|---|---|
| 2024 | Pattaya Exhibition and Convention Hall, Pattaya, Thailand | (Indonesia) Leani Ratri Oktila | (Indonesia) Fredy Setiawan (Indonesia) Khalimatus Sadiyah | 21–9, 21–16 | Gold |
| 2026 | Isa Sports City, Manama, Bahrain | (Indonesia) Leani Ratri Oktila | (China) Yang Jianyuan (China) Yang Qiuxia | 21–6, 21–15 | Gold |

=== World Abilitysport Games ===
Men's singles

| Year | Venue | Opponent | Score | Result | Ref |
|---|---|---|---|---|---|
| 2023 | Terminal 21 Korat Hall, Nakhon Ratchasima, Thailand | (Indonesia) Fredy Setiawan | 18–21, 9–21 | Silver | |

Mixed doubles

| Year | Venue | Partner | Opponent | Score | Result |
|---|---|---|---|---|---|
| 2023 | Terminal 21 Korat, Nakhon Ratchasima, Thailand | (Indonesia) Leani Ratri Oktila | (Indonesia) Fredy Setiawan (Indonesia) Khalimatus Sadiyah | 21–8, 21–19 | Gold |

=== Asian Para Games ===
Men's singles

| Year | Venue | Opponent | Score | Result |
|---|---|---|---|---|
| 2018 | Istora Gelora Bung Karno, Jakarta, Indonesia | (Indonesia) Fredy Setiawan | 16–21, 5–21 | Bronze |

Mixed doubles

| Year | Venue | Partner | Opponent | Score | Result |
|---|---|---|---|---|---|
| 2018 | Istora Gelora Bung Karno, Jakarta, Indonesia | (Indonesia) Khalimatus Sadiyah | (Indonesia) Hary Susanto (Indonesia) Leani Ratri Oktila | 17–21, 9–21 | Bronze |
| 2022 | Binjiang Gymnasium, Hangzhou, China | (Indonesia) Leani Ratri Oktila | (Indonesia) Fredy Setiawan (Indonesia) Khalimatus Sadiyah | 21–7, 21–8 | Gold |
| 2026 | Ichinomiya City Municipal Gymnasium, Ichinomiya, Japan | (Indonesia) Leani Ratri Oktila | (India) Kumar Nitesh (India) Thulasimathi Murugesan | 11–21, 21–19, 21–14 | Gold |

=== ASEAN Para Games ===
Men's singles

| Year | Venue | Opponent | Score | Result |
|---|---|---|---|---|
| 2022 | Edutorium Muhammadiyah University of Surakarta, Surakarta, Indonesia | (Indonesia) Fredy Setiawan | 17–21, 19–21 | Silver |
| 2023 | Morodok Techo Badminton Hall, Phnom Penh, Cambodia | (Malaysia) Mohd Amin Burhanuddin | 18–21, 21–9, 14–21 | Silver |
| 2025 | SPDAT Convention Center, Nakhon Ratchasima Sports Complex, Nakhon Ratchasima, Thailand | (Indonesia) Fredy Setiawan | 14–21, 21–18, 21–19 | Gold |

Men's doubles

| Year | Venue | Partner | Opponent | Score | Result |
|---|---|---|---|---|---|
| 2025 | SPDAT Convention Center, Nakhon Ratchasima Sports Complex, Nakhon Ratchasima, Thailand | (Indonesia) Maman Nurjaman | (Indonesia) Fredy Setiawan (Indonesia) Dwiyoko | 18–21, 21–23 | Silver |

Mixed doubles

| Year | Venue | Partner | Opponent | Score | Result |
|---|---|---|---|---|---|
| 2023 | Morodok Techo Badminton Hall, Phnom Penh, Cambodia | (Indonesia) Leani Ratri Oktila | (Indonesia) Fredy Setiawan (Indonesia) Khalimatus Sadiyah | 21–15, 21–19 | Gold |
| 2025 | SPDAT Convention Center, Nakhon Ratchasima Sports Complex, Nakhon Ratchasima, Thailand | (Indonesia) Leani Ratri Oktila | (Indonesia) Fredy Setiawan (Indonesia) Khalimatus Sadiyah | 21–7, 21–4 | Gold |

=== Asian Youth Para Games ===
Boys' singles

| Year | Venue | Opponent | Score | Result |
|---|---|---|---|---|
| 2017 | Al Wasl Club, Dubai, United Arab Emirates | (India) Nilesh Gaikwad | 21–8, 22–20 | Gold |
| 2021 | Alba Club, Manama, Bahrain | (India) Naveen Sivakumar | 21–10, 21–14 | Gold |

Mixed doubles

| Year | Venue | Partner | Opponent | Score | Result |
|---|---|---|---|---|---|
| 2017 (Note: This tournament uses a round robin system.) | Al Wasl Club, Dubai, United Arab Emirates | (Indonesia) Khalimatus Sadiyah | (India) Mohammad Arwaz Ansari (India) Arati Janoba Patil | 21–5, 21–4 | Gold |
| 2017 | Al Wasl Club, Dubai, United Arab Emirates | (Indonesia) Khalimatus Sadiyah | (United Arab Emirates) Humaid Alsanani (United Arab Emirates) Salama Alkhateri | Walkover | Gold |
| 2021 | Alba Club, Manama, Bahrain | (Indonesia) Adinda Nugraheni | (India) Hardik Makkar (India) Sanjana Kumari | 21–15, 21–8 | Gold |

=== BWF Para Badminton World Circuit (24 titles, 2 runners-up) ===
The BWF Para Badminton World Circuit – Grade 2, Level 1, 2 and 3 tournaments has been sanctioned by the Badminton World Federation from 2022.

Men's singles

| Year | Tournament | Level | Opponent | Score | Result | Ref |
|---|---|---|---|---|---|---|
| 2022 | Indonesia Para Badminton International | Level 3 | (Indonesia) Fredy Setiawan | 21–18, 21–18 | (gold) Winner | |
| 2024 | Bahrain Para Badminton International | Level 1 | (Indonesia) Fredy Setiawan | 22–20, 21–23, 21–14 | (gold) Winner | |

Men's doubles

| Year | Tournament | Level | Partner | Opponent | Score | Result | Ref |
|---|---|---|---|---|---|---|---|
| 2022 | Dubai Para Badminton International | Level 2 | (Indonesia) Ukun Rukaendi | (Indonesia) Dwiyoko (Indonesia) Fredy Setiawan | 18–21, 16–21 | (silver) Runner-up | |
| 2023 | Indonesia Para-Badminton International | Level 3 | (Indonesia) Maman Nurjaman | (Indonesia) Dwiyoko (Indonesia) Fredy Setiawan | 22–20, 18–21, 18–21 | (silver) Runner-up | |
| 2025 | Thailand Para Badminton International | Level 2 | (Indonesia) Muh Al Imran | (India) Jagadesh Dilli (India) Naveen Sivakumar | 21–11, 15–21, 21–12 | (gold) Winner | |
| 2026 | French Para Badminton International | Level 2 | (Indonesia) Fredy Setiawan | (India) Naveen Sivakumar (India) Surya Kant Yadav | 21–12, 21–15 | (gold) Winner | |
| 2026 | British & Irish Para Badminton International | Level 1 | (Indonesia) Fredy Setiawan | (India) Naveen Sivakumar (India) Surya Kant Yadav | 21–18, 21–9 | (gold) Winner | |
| 2026 | China Para Badminton International | Level 2 | (Indonesia) Fredy Setiawan | (India) Naveen Sivakumar (India) Surya Kant Yadav | 21–16, 19–21, 21–10 | (gold) Winner | |
| 2026 | Japan Para Badminton International | Level 2 | (Indonesia) Fredy Setiawan | (India) Pramod Bhagat (India) Sukant Kadam | 21–5, 21–15 | (gold) Winner | |

Mixed doubles

| Year | Tournament | Level | Partner | Opponent | Score | Result | Ref |
|---|---|---|---|---|---|---|---|
| 2023 | Spanish Para-Badminton International | Level 2 | (Indonesia) Leani Ratri Oktila | (India) Chirag Baretha (India) Mandeep Kaur | 21–11, 21–12 | (gold) Winner | |
| 2023 | Brazil Para-Badminton International | Level 2 | (Indonesia) Leani Ratri Oktila | (India) Kumar Nitesh (India) Thulasimathi Murugesan | 21–18, 21–9 | (gold) Winner | |
| 2023 | Thailand Para Badminton International | Level 2 | (Indonesia) Leani Ratri Oktila | (France) Lucas Mazur (France) Faustine Noël | 21–3, 21–19 | (gold) Winner | |
| 2023 | Bahrain Para Badminton International | Level 2 | (Indonesia) Leani Ratri Oktila | (Indonesia) Fredy Setiawan (Indonesia) Khalimatus Sadiyah | 21–7, 16–21, 21–15 | (gold) Winner | |
| 2023 | Canada Para Badminton International | Level 1 | (Indonesia) Leani Ratri Oktila | (Indonesia) Fredy Setiawan (Indonesia) Khalimatus Sadiyah | 21–12, 19–21, 21–12 | (gold) Winner | |
| 2023 | 4 Nations Para Badminton International | Level 1 | (Indonesia) Leani Ratri Oktila | (India) Pramod Bhagat (India) Manisha Ramadass | 21–17, 21–17 | (gold) Winner | |
| 2023 | Indonesia Para-Badminton International | Level 3 | (Indonesia) Leani Ratri Oktila | (Indonesia) Fredy Setiawan (Indonesia) Khalimatus Sadiyah | 21–10, 21–17 | (gold) Winner | |
| 2023 | Japan Para Badminton International | Level 2 | (Indonesia) Leani Ratri Oktila | (Indonesia) Fredy Setiawan (Indonesia) Khalimatus Sadiyah | 21–15, 21–13 | (gold) Winner | |
| 2023 | Dubai Para Badminton International | Level 2 | (Indonesia) Leani Ratri Oktila | (India) Pramod Bhagat (India) Manisha Ramadass | 21–14, 21–11 | (gold) Winner | |
| 2024 | 4 Nations Para Badminton International | Level 1 | (Indonesia) Leani Ratri Oktila | (Indonesia) Fredy Setiawan (Indonesia) Khalimatus Sadiyah | 21–9, 21–11 | (gold) Winner | |
| 2024 | Indonesia Para Badminton International | Level 2 | (Indonesia) Leani Ratri Oktila | (Indonesia) Fredy Setiawan (Indonesia) Khalimatus Sadiyah | 21–12, 21–10 | (gold) Winner | |
| 2024 | Bahrain Para Badminton International | Level 1 | (Indonesia) Leani Ratri Oktila | (Indonesia) Fredy Setiawan (Indonesia) Khalimatus Sadiyah | 21–6, 21–9 | (gold) Winner | |
| 2025 | Indonesia Para Badminton International | Level 1 | (Indonesia) Leani Ratri Oktila | (Indonesia) Fredy Setiawan (Indonesia) Khalimatus Sadiyah | 21–6, 21–9 | (gold) Winner | |
| 2026 | French Para Badminton International | Level 2 | (Indonesia) Leani Ratri Oktila | (India) Pramod Bhagat (India) Manisha Ramadass | walkover | (gold) Winner | |
| 2026 | British & Irish Para Badminton International | Level 1 | (Indonesia) Leani Ratri Oktila | (Indonesia) Fredy Setiawan (Indonesia) Khalimatus Sadiyah | 21–4, 21–15 | (gold) Winner | |
| 2026 | China Para Badminton International | Level 2 | (Indonesia) Leani Ratri Oktila | (India) Kumar Nitesh (France) Maud Lefort | 21–17, 21–14 | (gold) Winner | |
| 2026 | Japan Para Badminton International | Level 2 | (Indonesia) Leani Ratri Oktila | (France) Méril Loquette (France) Laureen Marchand | 21–19, 21–6 | (gold) Winner | |

=== International Tournaments (1 runner-up) ===
Men's doubles

| Year | Tournament | Partner | Opponent | Score | Result |
|---|---|---|---|---|---|
| 2018 | Irish Para Badminton International | (Indonesia) Maman Nurjaman | (Indonesia) Ukun Rukaendi (Indonesia) Hary Susanto | 14–21, 16–21 | (silver) Runner-up |
