= Yang Jianyuan =

Chinese para-badminton player

Yang Jianyuan 杨健远
Personal information
- Born: 3 April 1988 (age 38) Guangdong, China

Sport
- Country: China
- Sport: Badminton

Men's singles SL3 Men's doubles SL3–SL4 Mixed doubles SL3–SU5
- Highest ranking: 38 (MS 1 January 2019); 6 (MD with Chen Xiaoyu 1 January 2019); 7 (XD with Yang Qiuxia 1 January 2019)
- Current ranking: 58 (MS); 12 (MD with Gao Yuyang); 11 (XD with Yang Qiuxia) (24 September 2024)
Medal record
Men's para-badminton
Representing China
World Championships
Silver medal – second place	2017 Ulsan	Men's doubles
Silver medal – second place	2017 Ulsan	Mixed doubles
Silver medal – second place	2026 Manama	Mixed doubles

Yang Jianyuan (Chinese: 杨健远; pinyin: Yáng Jiànyuǎn; born 3 April 1988) is a Chinese para-badminton player. He was a silver medalist in both men's doubles and mixed doubles at the 2017 BWF Para-Badminton World Championships.

He made his Paralympic debut in 2024, where he competed in the men's singles SL3 event and the mixed doubles SL3–SU5 event but failed to advance to the knockout rounds in both events.

== Biography ==
Yang was born in Guangdong, China. At three months old, Yang was diagnosed with polio from a vaccine complication which caused the muscles of his left leg to be atrophied. In 2012, he was introduced to para-badminton after his friends suggested him to compete in badminton instead of basketball.

== Achievements ==
=== World Championships ===
Men's doubles SL3–SL4

Year	Venue	Partner	Opponent	Score	Result
2017	Dongchun Gymnasium, Ulsan, South Korea	(China) Chen Xiaoyu	(Indonesia) Ukun Rukaendi (Indonesia) Hary Susanto	10–21, 12–21	Silver

Mixed doubles SL3–SU5

Year	Venue	Partner	Opponent	Score	Result
2017	Dongchun Gymnasium, Ulsan, South Korea	(China) Yang Qiuxia	(Indonesia) Hary Susanto (Indonesia) Leani Ratri Oktila	14–21, 14–21	Silver
