= 1997 Davidoff Swiss Indoors =

- Date: 29 September – 5 October
- Edition: 28th
- Category: World Series
- Draw: 32S / 16D
- Prize money: $975,000
- Surface: Carpet / indoor
- Location: Basel, Switzerland
- Venue: St. Jakobshalle

Champions

Singles
- (United Kingdom) Greg Rusedski

Doubles
- (United Kingdom) Tim Henman / (Switzerland) Marc Rosset
← 1996 ·	Swiss Indoors	· 1998 →

The 1997 Davidoff Swiss Indoors was a men's tennis tournament played on indoor carpet courts at the St. Jakobshalle in Basel, Switzerland that was part of the World Series of the 1997 ATP Tour. It was the 28th edition of the tournament and was held from 29 September until 5 October 1996. Fourth-seeded Greg Rusedski won the singles title.

== Finals ==
=== Singles ===
(United Kingdom) Greg Rusedski defeated (Australia) Mark Philippoussis 6–3, 7–6^{(8–6)}, 7–6^{(7–3)}

- It was Rusedski's 2nd singles title of the year and the 5th of his career.

=== Doubles ===
(United Kingdom) Tim Henman / (Switzerland) Marc Rosset defeated (Germany) Karsten Braasch / (United States) Jim Grabb 7–6, 6–7, 7–6
