= 2026 BWF Para-Badminton World Championships – Men's Singles SU5 =

Men's Singles SU5 at 2026 BWF Para-Badminton World Championships
Tournament details
- Dates: 8–14 February 2026
- Competitors: 32
- Venue: Isa Sports City, Manama

The men's singles SU5 tournament at the 2026 BWF Para-Badminton World Championships took place from 8 to 14 February 2026 at Isa Sports City in Manama. A total of 32 players competed at the tournament.

== Classification ==
- SU5
  Players have impairment of the upper limbs.

== Format ==
The 32 players were split into 8 groups of four players. They played a round-robin tournament with the top 2 players advancing to the knockout stage. Each match was played in a best-of-3.

== Seeds ==
These were the seeds for this event:

1. (Malaysia) Cheah Liek Hou (champion)
2. (France) Méril Loquette (Quarter-finals)

== Group stage ==
All times are local (UTC+3).

=== Group A ===
Pos	Team	Pld	W	L	GF	GA	GD	PF	PA	PD	Pts	Qualification
1	Cheah Liek Hou (MAS) [1]	3	3	0	6	0	+6	126	61	+65	3	Knockout stage
2	İlker Tuzcu (TUR)	3	2	1	4	2	+2	112	86	+26	2	Knockout stage
3	Joshua Huang (USA)	3	1	2	2	4	−2	93	107	−14	1	
4	Volodymir Syniahovskyi (UKR)	3	0	3	0	6	−6	49	126	−77	0	

Source: BWFBadminton.com

Date	Time	Player 1	Score	Player 2	Set 1	Set 2	Set 3
9 February	09:00	Volodymir Syniahovskyi (Ukraine)	0–2	(Turkey) İlker Tuzcu	7–21	8–21	
9 February	11:00	[1] Cheah Liek Hou (Malaysia)	2–0	(United States) Joshua Huang	21–14	21–8	
10 February	09:30	[1] Cheah Liek Hou (Malaysia)	2–0	(Ukraine) Volodymir Syniahovskyi	21–6	21–5	
10 February	11:30	İlker Tuzcu (Turkey)	2–0	(United States) Joshua Huang	21–12	21–17	
11 February	14:00	[1] Cheah Liek Hou (Malaysia)	2–0	(Turkey) İlker Tuzcu	21–19	21–9	
11 February	14:00	Volodymir Syniahovskyi (Ukraine)	0–2	(United States) Joshua Huang	6–21	17–21	

=== Group B ===
Pos	Team	Pld	W	L	GF	GA	GD	PF	PA	PD	Pts	Qualification
1	Méril Loquette (FRA) [2]	3	3	0	6	0	+6	126	52	+74	3	Knockout stage
2	Tay Wei Ming (SGP)	3	2	1	4	2	+2	103	67	+36	2	Knockout stage
3	Caleb Omolo (KEN)	3	1	2	2	4	−2	79	112	−33	1	
4	Jean Paul Ortiz Vargas (COL)	3	0	3	0	6	−6	49	126	−77	0	

Source: BWFBadminton.com

Date	Time	Player 1	Score	Player 2	Set 1	Set 2	Set 3
9 February	09:00	[2] Méril Loquette (France)	2–0	(Singapore) Tay Wei Ming	21–8	21–11	
9 February	11:00	Caleb Omolo (Kenya)	2–0	(Colombia) Jean Paul Ortiz Vargas	21–14	21–14	
10 February	10:00	[2] Méril Loquette (France)	2–0	(Kenya) Caleb Omolo	21–13	21–8	
10 February	10:00	Jean Paul Ortiz Vargas (Colombia)	0–2	(Singapore) Tay Wei Ming	4–21	5–21	
11 February	14:00	[2] Méril Loquette (France)	2–0	(Colombia) Jean Paul Ortiz Vargas	21–7	21–5	
11 February	14:00	Caleb Omolo (Kenya)	0–2	(Singapore) Tay Wei Ming	8–21	8–21	

=== Group C ===
Pos	Team	Pld	W	L	GF	GA	GD	PF	PA	PD	Pts	Qualification
1	Lee Jeong-soo (KOR)	3	3	0	6	0	+6	127	93	+34	3	Knockout stage
2	Taiyo Imai (JPN)	3	2	1	4	2	+2	123	92	+31	2	Knockout stage
3	Amyrul Yazid Ahmad Sibi (MAS)	3	1	2	2	5	−3	126	130	−4	1	
4	Burak May (TUR)	3	0	3	1	6	−5	83	144	−61	0	

Source: BWFBadminton.com

Date	Time	Player 1	Score	Player 2	Set 1	Set 2	Set 3
9 February	11:00	Taiyo Imai (Japan)	0–2	(South Korea) Lee Jeong-soo	19–21	20–22	
9 February	11:00	Amyrul Yazid Ahmad Sibi (Malaysia)	2–1	(Turkey) Burak May	21–16	18–21	21–9
10 February	12:00	Taiyo Imai (Japan)	2–0	(Malaysia) Amyrul Yazid Ahmad Sibi	21–14	21–19	
10 February	12:00	Burak May (Turkey)	0–2	(South Korea) Lee Jeong-soo	6–21	15–21	
11 February	14:30	Taiyo Imai (Japan)	2–0	(Turkey) Burak May	21–12	21–4	
11 February	14:30	Amyrul Yazid Ahmad Sibi (Malaysia)	0–2	(South Korea) Lee Jeong-soo	19–21	14–21	

=== Group D ===
Pos	Team	Pld	W	L	GF	GA	GD	PF	PA	PD	Pts	Qualification
1	Fang Jen-yu (TPE)	3	3	0	6	0	+6	126	71	+55	3	Knockout stage
2	Hardik Makkar (IND)	3	2	1	4	2	+2	114	94	+20	2	Knockout stage
3	Abdoullah Aït Bella (FRA)	3	1	2	2	5	−3	109	130	−21	1	
4	Thomas Denesfield Slade (NZL)	3	0	3	1	6	−5	87	141	−54	0	

Source: BWFBadminton.com

Date	Time	Player 1	Score	Player 2	Set 1	Set 2	Set 3
9 February	09:00	Fang Jen-yu (Chinese Taipei)	2–0	(France) Abdoullah Aït Bella	21–10	21–16	
9 February	09:00	Thomas Denesfield Slade (New Zealand)	0–2	(India) Hardik Makkar	10–21	16–21	
10 February	10:00	Hardik Makkar (India)	2–0	(France) Abdoullah Aït Bella	21–12	21–14	
10 February	12:00	Fang Jen-yu (Chinese Taipei)	2–0	(New Zealand) Thomas Denesfield Slade	21–10	21–5	
11 February	14:30	Fang Jen-yu (Chinese Taipei)	2–0	(India) Hardik Makkar	21–12	21–18	
11 February	14:30	Thomas Denesfield Slade (New Zealand)	1–2	(France) Abdoullah Aït Bella	21–15	14–21	11–21

=== Group E ===
Pos	Team	Pld	W	L	GF	GA	GD	PF	PA	PD	Pts	Qualification
1	Ruthick Ragupathi (IND)	3	3	0	6	0	+6	126	80	+46	3	Knockout stage
2	Nattaphon Thaweesap (THA)	3	2	1	4	2	+2	116	88	+28	2	Knockout stage
3	Rishav Sharma (CAN)	3	1	2	2	4	−2	104	104	0	1	
4	Manuel García (ESP)	3	0	3	0	6	−6	52	126	−74	0	

Source: BWFBadminton.com

Date	Time	Player 1	Score	Player 2	Set 1	Set 2	Set 3
9 February	09:30	Ruthick Ragupathi (India)	2–0	(Canada) Rishav Sharma	21–11	21–18	
9 February	11:30	Manuel García (Spain)	0–2	(Thailand) Nattaphon Thaweesap	5–21	8–21	
10 February	12:00	Ruthick Ragupathi (India)	2–0	(Spain) Manuel García	21–11	21–9	
10 February	12:30	Nattaphon Thaweesap (Thailand)	2–0	(Canada) Rishav Sharma	22–20	21–13	
11 February	15:00	Ruthick Ragupathi (India)	2–0	(Thailand) Nattaphon Thaweesap	21–16	21–15	
11 February	15:00	Manuel García (Spain)	0–2	(Canada) Rishav Sharma	8–21	11–21	

=== Group F ===
Pos	Team	Pld	W	L	GF	GA	GD	PF	PA	PD	Pts	Qualification
1	Bartłomiej Mróz (POL)	3	3	0	6	0	+6	126	73	+53	3	Knockout stage
2	David Jack Wilson (WAL)	3	2	1	4	3	+1	120	128	−8	2	Knockout stage
3	Chirag Baretha (IND)	3	1	2	3	4	−1	126	128	−2	1	
4	Yuki Roberto Rodrigues (BRA)	3	0	3	0	6	−6	83	126	−43	0	

Source: BWFBadminton.com

Date	Time	Player 1	Score	Player 2	Set 1	Set 2	Set 3
9 February	09:30	Chirag Baretha (India)	2–0	(Brazil) Yuki Roberto Rodrigues	21–19	21–10	
9 February	11:30	David Jack Wilson (Wales)	0–2	(Poland) Bartłomiej Mróz	12–21	9–21	
10 February	10:00	Yuki Roberto Rodrigues (Brazil)	0–2	(Poland) Bartłomiej Mróz	12–21	11–21	
10 February	12:30	David Jack Wilson (Wales)	2–1	(India) Chirag Baretha	15–21	21–17	21–17
11 February	15:00	David Jack Wilson (Wales)	2–0	(Brazil) Yuki Roberto Rodrigues	21–12	21–19	
11 February	15:00	Chirag Baretha (India)	0–2	(Poland) Bartłomiej Mróz	14–21	15–21	

=== Group G ===
Pos	Team	Pld	W	L	GF	GA	GD	PF	PA	PD	Pts	Qualification
1	Li Mingpan (CHN)	2	2	0	4	0	+4	84	54	+30	2	Knockout stage
2	Robert Donald (ENG)	2	1	1	2	2	0	74	50	+24	1	Knockout stage
3	Pablo Serrano (ESP)	2	0	2	0	4	−4	30	84	−54	0	
4	Prince Mamvumvu-Kidila (COD)	0	0	0	0	0	0	0	0	0	0	Withdrew

Source: BWFBadminton.com

Date	Time	Player 1	Score	Player 2	Set 1	Set 2	Set 3
9 February	11:30	Li Mingpan (China)	2–0	(Spain) Pablo Serrano	21–10	21–12	
10 February	10:30	Robert Donald (England)	0–2	(China) Li Mingpan	15–21	17–21	
11 February	15:30	Robert Donald (England)	2–0	(Spain) Pablo Serrano	21–5	21–3	

=== Group H ===
Pos	Team	Pld	W	L	GF	GA	GD	PF	PA	PD	Pts	Qualification
1	Pu Gui-yu (TPE)	3	3	0	6	0	+6	127	90	+37	3	Knockout stage
2	Kim Gi-yeon (KOR)	3	2	1	4	2	+2	111	98	+13	2	Knockout stage
3	Ibrahim Aliyev (AZE)	3	1	2	2	5	−3	123	128	−5	1	
4	Jairo Aranguri (PER)	3	0	3	1	6	−5	96	141	−45	0	

Source: BWFBadminton.com

Date	Time	Player 1	Score	Player 2	Set 1	Set 2	Set 3
9 February	12:00	Pu Gui-yu (Chinese Taipei)	2–0	(South Korea) Kim Gi-yeon	21–9	21–18	
9 February	12:00	Ibrahim Aliyev (Azerbaijan)	2–1	(Peru) Jairo Aranguri	15–21	21–13	21–9
10 February	13:00	Pu Gui-yu (Chinese Taipei)	2–0	(Azerbaijan) Ibrahim Aliyev	22–20	21–15	
10 February	13:00	Jairo Aranguri (Peru)	0–2	(South Korea) Kim Gi-yeon	10–21	15–21	
11 February	15:30	Pu Gui-yu (Chinese Taipei)	2–0	(Peru) Jairo Aranguri	21–12	21–16	
11 February	15:30	Ibrahim Aliyev (Azerbaijan)	0–2	(South Korea) Kim Gi-yeon	14–21	17–21	

== Knockout stage ==
Round of 16
1/A1	(Malaysia) Cheah Liek Hou	21	21
H2	(South Korea) Kim Gi-yeon	15	10
E1	(India) Ruthick Ragupathi	21	21
B2	(Singapore) Tay Wei Ming	3	12
C1	(South Korea) Lee Jeong-soo	14	17
F2	(Wales) David Jack Wilson	21	21
H1	(Chinese Taipei) Pu Gui-yu	21	22	12
C2	(Japan) Taiyo Imai	18	24	21
D2	(India) Hardik Makkar	12	15
G1	(China) Li Mingpan	21	21
G2	(England) Robert Donald	17	15
D1	(Chinese Taipei) Fang Jen-yu	21	21
A2	(Turkey) İlker Tuzcu	21	21
F1	(Poland) Bartłomiej Mróz	19	14
E2	(Thailand) Nattaphon Thaweesap	17	15
2/B1	(France) Méril Loquette	21	21

Quarter-finals
1/A1	(Malaysia) Cheah Liek Hou	21	21
E1	(India) Ruthick Ragupathi	12	11
F2	(Wales) David Jack Wilson	14	11
C2	(Japan) Taiyo Imai	21	21
G1	(China) Li Mingpan	19	11
D1	(Chinese Taipei) Fang Jen-yu	21	21
A2	(Turkey) İlker Tuzcu	21	21
2/B1	(France) Méril Loquette	16	19

Semi-finals
1/A1	(Malaysia) Cheah Liek Hou	21	22
C2	(Japan) Taiyo Imai	12	20
D1	(Chinese Taipei) Fang Jen-yu	21	21
A2	(Turkey) İlker Tuzcu	13	16

Final
1/A1	(Malaysia) Cheah Liek Hou	21	21
D1	(Chinese Taipei) Fang Jen-yu	6	11
