= Badminton at the 2023 European Para Championships – Men's doubles SU5 =

Badminton's men's doubles SU5 at the 2023 European Para Championships
- Venue: Rotterdam Ahoy, Rotterdam
- Dates: 15 – 20 August
- Competitors: 18 from 7 nations

Medalists
| gold medal | Méril Loquette; Lucas Mazur | France |
| silver medal | Bartłomiej Mróz; Jack Wilson | Mixed-NOCs |
| bronze medal | Robert Donald; Sean O'Sullivan | Great Britain |
| bronze medal | Burak May; İlker Tuzcu | Turkey |

The men's doubles SU5 badminton tournament at the 2023 European Para Championships was played from 15 to 20 August 2023 in Rotterdam Ahoy, Rotterdam. A total of 9 pairs competed at the tournament, five of whom was seeded.

== Competition schedule ==
Play took place between 15 and 20 August.

| GS | Group stage | ¼ | Quarterfinals | ½ | Semifinals | F | Final |

| Events | Tue 15 | Wed 16 | Thu 17 | Fri 18 | Sat 19 | Sun 20 |
|---|---|---|---|---|---|---|
| Men's doubles SU5 | GS | GS | GS | ¼ | ½ | F |

== Seeds ==
The following players were seeded:

1. Méril Loquette / Lucas Mazur (FRA) (champion; gold medalist)
2. Burak May / İlker Tuzcu (TUR) (semi-finals; bronze medalist)
3. Mathis Clément / Teddy Ferrazza (FRA) (group stage)

== Group stage ==
=== Group A ===
| Pos | Team | Pld | W | L | GF | GA | GD | PF | PA | PD | Qualification |
|---|---|---|---|---|---|---|---|---|---|---|---|
| 1 | Méril Loquette (FRA) Lucas Mazur (FRA) [1] | 2 | 2 | 0 | 4 | 0 | +4 | 84 | 12 | +72 | Qualification to elimination stage |
| 2 | Diogo Daniel (POR) Bruno Faria (POR) | 2 | 1 | 1 | 2 | 2 | 0 | 48 | 73 | −25 | Qualification to elimination stage |
| 3 | Ilyas Hussain (IRL) Niall Jarvie (GBR) | 2 | 0 | 2 | 0 | 4 | −4 | 37 | 84 | −47 | |

Source: Group A – standings

| Date | | Score | | Game 1 | Game 2 | Game 3 |
|---|---|---|---|---|---|---|
| 15 August | Ilyas Hussain (Republic of Ireland); Niall Jarvie (United Kingdom) | 0–2 | (Portugal) Diogo Daniel (Portugal) Bruno Faria | 15–21 | 16–21 | |
| 16 August | Méril Loquette (France); Lucas Mazur (France) | 2–0 | (Republic of Ireland) Ilyas Hussain (United Kingdom) Niall Jarvie | 21–3 | 21–3 | |
| 17 August | Méril Loquette (France); Lucas Mazur (France) | 2–0 | (Portugal) Diogo Daniel (Portugal) Bruno Faria | 21–4 | 21–2 | |

=== Group B ===
| Pos | Team | Pld | W | L | GF | GA | GD | PF | PA | PD | Qualification |
|---|---|---|---|---|---|---|---|---|---|---|---|
| 1 | Burak May (TUR) İlker Tuzcu (TUR) [2] | 2 | 2 | 0 | 4 | 0 | +4 | 84 | 43 | +41 | Qualification to elimination stage |
| 2 | Manuel García (ESP) Pablo Serrano (ESP) | 2 | 1 | 1 | 2 | 2 | 0 | 74 | 68 | +6 | Qualification to elimination stage |
| 3 | Pierre Delsol (FRA) Antonin Richard (FRA) | 2 | 0 | 2 | 0 | 4 | −4 | 37 | 84 | −47 | |

Source: Group B – standings

| Date | | Score | | Game 1 | Game 2 | Game 3 |
|---|---|---|---|---|---|---|
| 15 August | Manuel García (Spain); Pablo Serrano (Spain) | 2–0 | (France) Pierre Delsol (France) Antonin Richard | 21–10 | 21–16 | |
| 16 August | Burak May (Turkey); İlker Tuzcu (Turkey) | 2–0 | (Spain) Manuel García (Spain) Pablo Serrano | 21–16 | 21–16 | |
| 17 August | Burak May (Turkey); İlker Tuzcu (Turkey) | 2–0 | (France) Pierre Delsol (France) Antonin Richard | 21–7 | 21–4 | |

=== Group C ===
| Pos | Team | Pld | W | L | GF | GA | GD | PF | PA | PD | Qualification |
|---|---|---|---|---|---|---|---|---|---|---|---|
| 1 | Bartłomiej Mróz (POL) Jack Wilson (GBR) | 2 | 2 | 0 | 4 | 1 | +3 | 104 | 60 | +44 | Qualification to elimination stage |
| 2 | Robert Donald (GBR) Sean O'Sullivan (GBR) | 0 | 0 | 0 | 0 | 0 | 0 | 0 | 0 | 0 | Qualification to elimination stage |
| 3 | Mathias Clément (FRA) Teddy Ferrazza (FRA) [3] | 2 | 0 | 2 | 0 | 4 | −4 | 34 | 84 | −50 | |

Source: Group C – standings

| Date | | Score | | Game 1 | Game 2 | Game 3 |
|---|---|---|---|---|---|---|
| 15 August | Bartłomiej Mróz (Poland); Jack Wilson (United Kingdom) | 2–1 | (United Kingdom) Robert Donald (United Kingdom) Sean O'Sullivan | 20–22 | 21–8 | 21–16 |
| 16 August | Mathias Clément (France); Teddy Ferrazza (France) | 0–2 | (Poland) Bartłomiej Mróz (United Kingdom) Jack Wilson | 7–21 | 7–21 | |
| 17 August | Mathias Clément (France); Teddy Ferrazza (France) | 0–2 | (United Kingdom) Robert Donald (United Kingdom) Sean O'Sullivan | 10–21 | 10–21 | |

== Elimination stage ==
Quarter-finals
Robert Donald (GBR); Sean O'Sullivan (GBR) | 21 | 21
Manuel García (ESP); Pablo Serrano (ESP) | 14 | 8
Diogo Daniel (POR); Bruno Faria (POR) | 9 | 1
Bartłomiej Mróz (POL); Jack Wilson (GBR) | 21 | 21

Semi-finals
1 | Méril Loquette (FRA); Lucas Mazur (FRA) | 21 | 21
Robert Donald (GBR); Sean O'Sullivan (GBR) | 14 | 16
Bartłomiej Mróz (POL); Jack Wilson (GBR) | 25 | 21 | 23
2 | Burak May (TUR); İlker Tuzcu (TUR) | 27 | 16 | 21

Final
1 | Méril Loquette (FRA); Lucas Mazur (FRA) | 21 | 21
Bartłomiej Mróz (POL); Jack Wilson (GBR) | 17 | 15
