= 1997 Davidoff Swiss Indoors – Singles =

Singles
- 1997 Davidoff Swiss Indoors

Final
- Champion: (United Kingdom) Greg Rusedski
- Runner-up: (Australia) Mark Philippoussis
- Score: 6–3, 7–6^{(8–6)}, 7–6^{(7–3)}

Details
- Draw: 32 (3Q/4WC/1LL)
- Seeds: 8

Events
Singles	Doubles
← 1996 ·	Swiss Indoors	· 1998 →

Pete Sampras was the defending champion, but did not compete this year.

Greg Rusedski won the title by defeating Mark Philippoussis 6–3, 7–6^{(8–6)}, 7–6^{(7–3)} in the final.

== Seeds ==
1. (Russia) Yevgeny Kafelnikov (quarterfinals)
2. (Spain) Carlos Moyá (second round)
3. (Croatia) Goran Ivanišević (first round)
4. (United Kingdom) Greg Rusedski (champion)
5. (Sweden) Thomas Enqvist (quarterfinals)
6. (Sweden) Jonas Björkman (second round)
7. (Czech Republic) Petr Korda (semifinals)
8. (Spain) Albert Costa (first round)

== Draw ==
=== Key ===
- Q = Qualifier
- WC = Wild card
- LL = Lucky loser
- Alt = Alternate
- ITF = ITF entry
- PR = Protected ranking
- SR = Special ranking
- SE = Special exempt
- JE = Junior exempt
- JR = Junior Accelerator Programme entrant
- CO = College Accelerator Programme entrant
- NG = Next Gen Accelerator Program entrant
- w/o = Walkover
- r = Retired
- d = Defaulted

=== Finals ===
Semifinals
(Australia) Mark Philippoussis	7^{7}	6
(United Kingdom) Tim Henman	6^{2}	4
4	(United Kingdom) Greg Rusedski	6^{5}	6	7
7	(Czech Republic) Petr Korda	7^{7}	3	5

Final
(Australia) Mark Philippoussis	3	6^{6}	6^{3}
4	(United Kingdom) Greg Rusedski	6	7^{8}	7^{7}

=== Top half ===
First round
1	(Russia) Y Kafelnikov	6	7^{7}
Q	(Switzerland) L Manta	1	6^{2}
WC	(Switzerland) I Heuberger	7^{7}	7
(Switzerland) M Rosset	6^{4}	5
(France) F Santoro	6	6
Q	(France) R Lavergne	3	3
(Australia) M Philippoussis	7^{7}	6
8	(Spain) A Costa	6^{3}	3
3/WC	(Croatia) G Ivanišević	3	3
(Slovakia) K Kučera	6	6
(United Kingdom) T Henman	7^{7}	6
(Germany) MK Goellner	6^{4}	3
Q	(Russia) A Olhovskiy	5	7^{7}	4
(Sweden) M Norman	7	6^{4}	6
(France) A Boetsch	2	3
6	(Sweden) J Björkman	6	6

Second round
1	(Russia) Y Kafelnikov	6	4	6
WC	(Switzerland) I Heuberger	3	6	3
(France) F Santoro	3	3
(Australia) M Philippoussis	6	6
(Slovakia) K Kučera	4	1
(United Kingdom) T Henman	6	6
(Sweden) M Norman	6	6
6	(Sweden) J Björkman	1	4

Quarterfinals
1	(Russia) Y Kafelnikov	3	7^{7}	2
(Australia) M Philippoussis	6	6^{5}	6
(United Kingdom) T Henman	6	6
(Sweden) M Norman	3	2

Semifinals
(Australia) M Philippoussis	7^{7}	6
(United Kingdom) T Henman	6^{2}	4

=== Bottom half ===
First round
5	(Sweden) T Enqvist	6	3	6
(Czech Republic) B Ulihrach	3	6	1
(Netherlands) J Siemerink	6^{4}	2
(United States) J Tarango	7^{7}	6
(South Africa) W Ferreira	6^{2}	6	7^{7}
(New Zealand) B Steven	7^{7}	1	6^{5}
(Germany) D Prinosil	6	4	5
4	(United Kingdom) G Rusedski	4	6	7
7	(Czech Republic) P Korda	6	6
Q	(France) N Escudé	1	4
(France) G Raoux	6^{4}	2
(United States) C Woodruff	7^{7}	6
(Netherlands) P Haarhuis	3	3
LL	(France) L Roux	6	6
WC	(Germany) T Haas	4	6	4
2	(Spain) C Moyá	6	3	6

Second round
5	(Sweden) T Enqvist	7	7
(United States) J Tarango	5	5
(South Africa) W Ferreira	3	6^{2}
4	(United Kingdom) G Rusedski	6	7^{7}
7	(Czech Republic) P Korda	7	6
(United States) C Woodruff	5	4
LL	(France) L Roux	6	3	7^{7}
2	(Spain) C Moyá	3	6	6^{4}

Quarterfinals
5	(Sweden) T Enqvist	6^{4}	6	3
4	(United Kingdom) G Rusedski	7^{7}	4	6
7	(Czech Republic) P Korda	6	6
LL	(France) L Roux	3	4

Semifinals
4	(United Kingdom) G Rusedski	6^{5}	6	7
7	(Czech Republic) P Korda	7^{7}	3	5
