= Bartłomiej Mróz =

Polish para badminton player

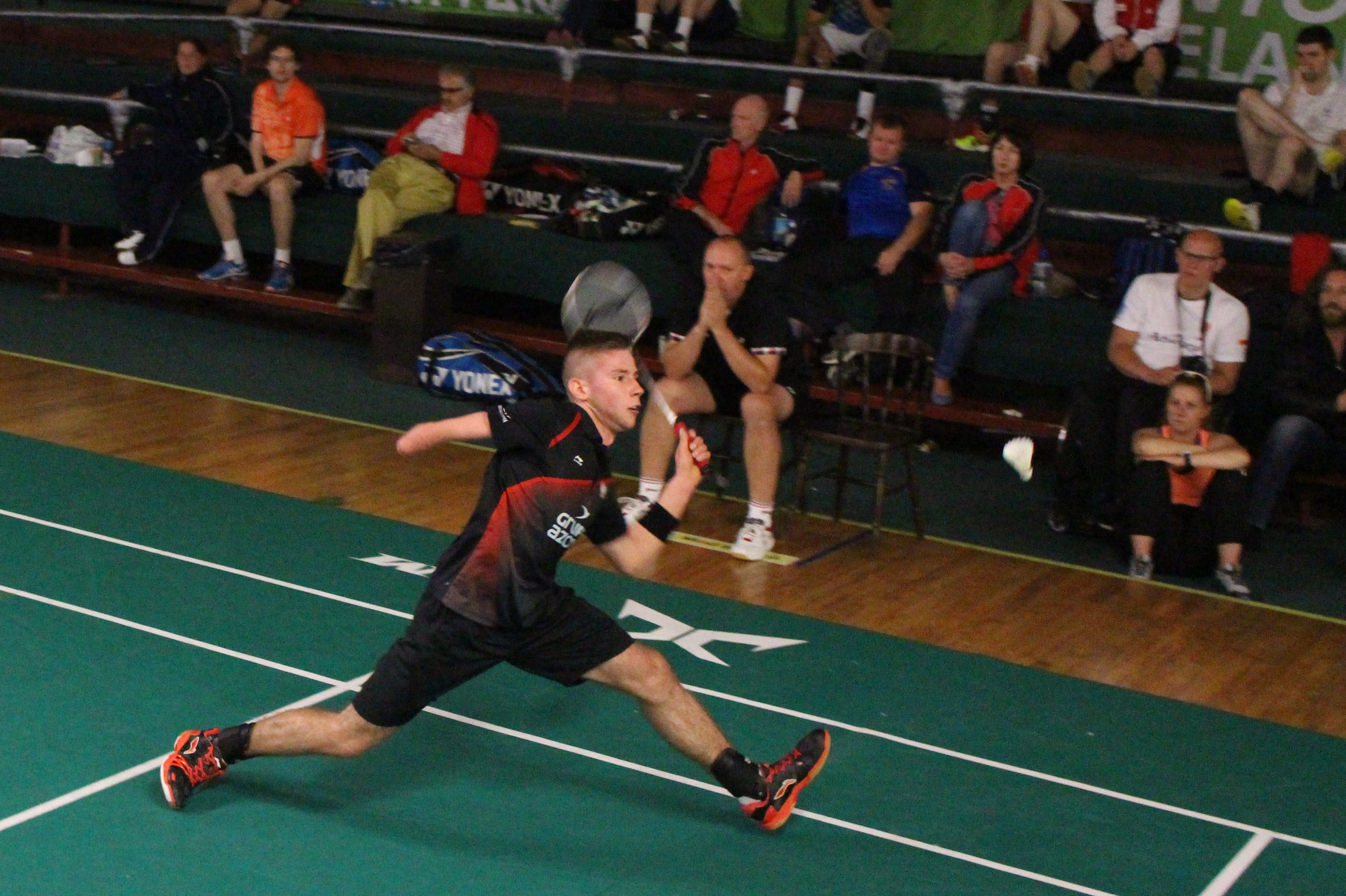
- Mróz in 2015

Personal information
- Born: 9 August 1994 (age 31) Kędzierzyn-Koźle, Poland
- Height: 1.75 m (5 ft 9 in)
- Weight: 66 kg (146 lb)

Sport
- Country: Poland
- Sport: Badminton

Men's singles and doubles SU5
- Highest ranking: 3 (MS 27 August 2019); 5 (MD with İlker Tuzcu 1 January 2019)
- Current ranking: 12 (MS); 10 (MD with Tay Wei Ming) (3 September 2024)
- BWF profile
Medal record
Para-badminton
Representing Poland
World Championships
Silver medal – second place	2013 Dortmund	Men's doubles
Silver medal – second place	2013 Dortmund	Men's singles
Silver medal – second place	2015 Stoke Mandeville	Men's singles
Silver medal – second place	2015 Stoke Mandeville	Men's doubles
Bronze medal – third place	2017 Ulsan	Men's singles
Bronze medal – third place	2019 Basel	Men's singles
European Para Championships
Silver medal – second place	2023 Rotterdam	Men's singles
Silver medal – second place	2023 Rotterdam	Men's doubles
European Championships
Gold medal – first place	2016 Beek	Men's doubles
Gold medal – first place	2018 Rodez	Men's singles
Gold medal – first place	2018 Rodez	Men's doubles
Silver medal – second place	2012 Dortmund	Men's singles
Silver medal – second place	2014 Murcia	Men's singles
Silver medal – second place	2016 Beek	Men's singles

Bartłomiej Mróz (born 9 August 1994) is a Polish para badminton player who competes in international level events. Mróz made his Paralympic badminton debut at the 2020 Summer Paralympics. Mróz is also a three-time European champion in men's doubles SU5 at the European Para-Badminton Championships.

== Early life ==
Mróz was born without his right forearm. In 2005, he joined the Municipal Interschool Sports Club in Kędzierzyn-Koźle, where he began to practice in para-badminton.

== Achievements ==
=== World Championships ===
Men's singles SU5

Year	Venue	Opponent	Score	Result
2013	Helmut-Körnig-Halle, Dortmund, Germany	(Malaysia) Cheah Liek Hou	18–21, 13–21	Silver
2015	Stoke Mandeville Stadium, Stoke Mandeville, England	(Malaysia) Cheah Liek Hou	16–21, 12–21	Silver
2017	Dongchun Gymnasium, Ulsan, South Korea	(Indonesia) Suryo Nugroho	12–21, 12–21	Bronze
2019	St. Jakobshalle, Basel, Switzerland	(Indonesia) Suryo Nugroho	14–21, 19–21	Bronze

Men's doubles SU5

Year	Venue	Partner	Opponent	Score	Result
2013	Helmut-Körnig-Halle, Dortmund, Germany	(Turkey) İlker Tuzcu	(Malaysia) Cheah Liek Hou (Malaysia) Suhaili Laiman	18–21, 17–21	Silver
2015	Stoke Mandeville Stadium, Stoke Mandeville, England	(Turkey) İlker Tuzcu	(Malaysia) Cheah Liek Hou (Malaysia) Hairol Fozi Saaba	21–18, 13–21, 16–21	Silver

=== European Para Championships ===
Men's singles SU5

Year	Venue	Opponent	Score	Result
2023	Rotterdam Ahoy, Rotterdam, Netherlands	(France) Méril Loquette	11–21, 13–21	Silver

Men's doubles SU5

Year	Venue	Partner	Opponent	Score	Result
2023	Rotterdam Ahoy, Rotterdam, Netherlands	(United Kingdom) Jack Wilson	(France) Méril Loquette (France) Lucas Mazur	17–21, 15–21	Silver

=== European Championships ===
Men's singles SU5

Year	Venue	Opponent	Score	Result
2012	Helmut-Körnig-Halle, Dortmund, Germany	(Turkey) İlker Tuzcu	17–21, 6–21	Silver
2014	High Performance Center, Murcia, Spain	(Turkey) İlker Tuzcu	18–21, 14–21	Silver
2016	Sporthal de Haamen, Beek, Netherlands	(Turkey) İlker Tuzcu	18–21, 14–21	Silver
2018	Amphitheatre Gymnasium, Rodez, France	(Turkey) İlker Tuzcu	21–15, 17–21, 21–13	Gold

Men's doubles SU5

Year	Venue	Partner	Opponent	Score	Result
2016	Sporthal de Haamen, Beek, Netherlands	(Turkey) İlker Tuzcu	(France) Méril Loquette (Wales) Jack Wilson	21–4, 21–14	Gold
2018	Amphitheatre Gymnasium, Rodez, France	(Turkey) İlker Tuzcu	(France) Méril Loquette (France) Lucas Mazur	21–19, 25–23	Gold

=== BWF Para Badminton World Circuit (3 runners-up) ===
The BWF Para Badminton World Circuit – Grade 2, Level 1, 2 and 3 tournaments has been sanctioned by the Badminton World Federation from 2022.

Men's singles SU5

Year	Tournament	Level	Opponent	Score	Result
2022	Bahrain Para Badminton International	Level 2	(Malaysia) Cheah Liek Hou	7–21, 12–21	(silver) Runner-up
2022	Indonesia Para Badminton International	Level 3	(Indonesia) Dheva Anrimusthi	9–21, 14–21	(silver) Runner-up
2022	Peru Para Badminton International	Level 2	(France) Méril Loquette	21–23, 12–21	(silver) Runner-up

=== International tournaments (from 2011–2021) (16 titles, 9 runners-up) ===
Men's singles SU5

Year	Tournament	Opponent	Score	Result
2013 (Note: This tournament uses a round robin system.)	Spanish Para Badminton International	(Spain) Moises Pujante Gomez	21–2, 21–2	(gold) Winner
2013	Spanish Para Badminton International	(Spain) Pablo Ramos	21–5, 21–0	(gold) Winner
2013	Spanish Para Badminton International	(South Korea) Kim Gi-yeon	21–9, 21–16	(gold) Winner
2015	China Para Badminton International	(Malaysia) Cheah Liek Hou	15–21, 19–21	(silver) Runner-up
2015	Irish Para Badminton International	(Singapore) Tay Wei Ming	23–21, 23–21	(gold) Winner
2016	Turkish Para Badminton International	(Turkey) İlker Tuzcu	21–14, 15–21, 14–21	(silver) Runner-up
2016	Indonesia Para Badminton International	(Indonesia) Suryo Nugroho	24–22, 21–13	(gold) Winner
2016	Colombia Para Badminton International	(Japan) Tetsuo Ura	21–17, 21–14	(gold) Winner
2017	Spanish Para Badminton International	(Malaysia) Cheah Liek Hou	18–21, 14–21	(silver) Runner-up
2017	Uganda Para Badminton International	(India) Pankaj Singh	21–9, 21–6	(gold) Winner
2017	Turkish Para Badminton International	(Turkey) İlker Tuzcu	21–12, 21–14	(gold) Winner
2017	Brazil Para Badminton International	(Brazil) Eduardo Oliveira	21–2, 21–5	(gold) Winner
2018	Dubai Para Badminton International	(Malaysia) Cheah Liek Hou	14–21, 9–21	(silver) Runner-up
2018	Brazil Para Badminton International	(Japan) Taiyo Imai	19–21, 21–10, 21–8	(gold) Winner
2018	Japan Para Badminton International	(Japan) Taiyo Imai	14–21, 11–21	(silver) Runner-up
2018	Denmark Para Badminton International	(Netherlands) Mark Modderman	21–11, 21–5	(gold) Winner
2018	Denmark Para Badminton International	(Wales) Jack Wilson	21–7, 21–18	(gold) Winner
2018	Denmark Para Badminton International	(Brazil) Eduardo Oliveira	21–5, 21–8	(gold) Winner
2018	Denmark Para Badminton International	(Netherlands) Joshua Donker	21–9, 21–4	(gold) Winner
2019	Irish Para Badminton International	(Indonesia) Dheva Anrimusthi	21–14, 11–21, 12–21	(silver) Runner-up

Men's doubles SU5

Year	Tournament	Partner	Opponent	Score	Result
2013	Spanish Para Badminton International	(South Korea) Kim Gi-yeon	(England) Bobby Griffin (Spain) Pablo Ramos	21–13, 21–16	(gold) Winner
2013	Spanish Para Badminton International	(South Korea) Kim Gi-yeon	(Nigeria) Jimoh Adisa Folawiyo (Spain) Moises Pujante Gomez	21–3, 21–2	(gold) Winner
2013	Spanish Para Badminton International	(South Korea) Kim Gi-yeon	(Scotland) Nail Jarvie (Scotland) David Purdle	21–8, 21–6	(gold) Winner
2013	Spanish Para Badminton International	(South Korea) Kim Gi-yeon	(England) Antony Forster (Germany) Jan-Niklas Pott	21–8, 21–15	(gold) Winner
2015	Irish Para Badminton International	(Turkey) İlker Tuzcu	(France) Colin Kerouanton (Singapore) Tay Wei Ming	21–13, 21–23, 22–20	(gold) Winner
2016	Turkish Para Badminton International	(Turkey) İlker Tuzcu	(England) Bobby Griffin (Germany) Jan-Niklas Pott	21–16, 21–18	(gold) Winner
2016	Irish Para Badminton International	(Singapore) Tay Wei Ming	(Malaysia) Cheah Liek Hou (Malaysia) Hairol Fozi Saaba	16–21, 21–19, 11–21	(silver) Runner-up
2016	Colombia Para Badminton International	(Japan) Tetsuo Ura	(Brazil) Ricardo Cavalli (Brazil) Eduardo Oliveira	21–5, 21–4	(gold) Winner
2017	Spanish Para Badminton International	(Turkey) İlker Tuzcu	(Malaysia) Cheah Liek Hou (Malaysia) Hairol Fozi Saaba	14–21, 20–22	(silver) Runner-up
2017	Uganda Para Badminton International	(India) Nilesh Gaikwad	(Uganda) Hussein Kasalirwe Kato (Uganda) Anthony Opoka	21–3, 21–7	(gold) Winner
2017	Uganda Para Badminton International	(India) Nilesh Gaikwad	(Uganda) George Byarugaba (Uganda) Isa Kasadha	21–3, 21–2	(gold) Winner
2017	Uganda Para Badminton International	(India) Nilesh Gaikwad	(India) Sugil Abbas (India) Pankaj Singh	21–19, 21–12	(gold) Winner
2017	Turkish Para Badminton International	(Turkey) İlker Tuzcu	(Turkey) Muzaffer Çimenli (Turkey) Burak May	Walkover	(gold) Winner
2017	Turkish Para Badminton International	(Turkey) İlker Tuzcu	(Thailand) Narinchort Khowbunyarasri (Thailand) Pricha Somsiri	21–8, 21–11	(gold) Winner
2017	Turkish Para Badminton International	(Turkey) İlker Tuzcu	(Russia) Mikhail Chiviksin (Russia) Oleg Dontsov	21–14, 17–21, 21–4	(gold) Winner
2017	Turkish Para Badminton International	(Turkey) İlker Tuzcu	(Russia) Anton Ivanov (Russia) Pavel Kulikov	21–8, 21–9	(gold) Winner
2017	Thailand Para Badminton International	(Turkey) İlker Tuzcu	(Malaysia) Cheah Liek Hou (Malaysia) Hairol Fozi Saaba	18–21, 14–21	(silver) Runner-up

Mixed doubles SU5

Year	Tournament	Partner	Opponent	Score	Result
2017	Brazil Para Badminton International	(Brazil) Maraisa Santos	(Brazil) Ricardo Cavalli (Brazil) Abinaecia Maria da Silva	15–21, 21–17, 21–18	(gold) Winner
2017	Brazil Para Badminton International	(Brazil) Maraisa Santos	(Peru) Pedro Pablo de Vinatea (Brazil) Mikaela Costa Almeida	21–10, 21–11	(gold) Winner
2017	Brazil Para Badminton International	(Brazil) Maraisa Santos	(Brazil) Cintya Oliveira (Brazil) Leonardo Zuffo	21–15, 21–14	(gold) Winner
2017	Brazil Para Badminton International	(Brazil) Maraisa Santos	(Brazil) Danielle Carvalho (Brazil) Rogerio Junior Xavier	21–11, 12–21, 21–8	(gold) Winner
