= 1998 Davidoff Swiss Indoors – Doubles =

Doubles
- 1998 Davidoff Swiss Indoors

Final
- Champions: (France) Olivier Delaître (France) Fabrice Santoro
- Runners-up: (South Africa) Piet Norval (Zimbabwe) Kevin Ullyett
- Score: 6–3, 7–6

Details
- Draw: 16
- Seeds: 4

Events
Singles	Doubles
← 1997 ·	Swiss Indoors	· 1999 →

The 1998 Davidoff Swiss Indoors was a tennis tournament played on indoor hard courts. It was the 29th edition of the event known that year as the Davidoff Swiss Indoors, and was part of the World Series of the 1998 ATP Tour. It took place at the St. Jakobshalle in Basel, Switzerland, from 5 October until 11 October 1998.

Tim Henman and Marc Rosset were the defending champions, but Henman did not compete this year in order to focus on the singles tournament. Rosset teamed up with Nicolas Kiefer and lost in the first round to tournament winners Olivier Delaître and Fabrice Santoro.

Delaître and Santoro won the title by defeating Piet Norval and Kevin Ullyett 6–3, 7–6 in the final.

== Seeds ==
Champion seeds are indicated in bold text while text in italics indicates the round in which those seeds were eliminated.

1. (South Africa) Ellis Ferreira / (United States) Rick Leach (quarterfinals)
2. (Czechoslovakia) Martin Damm / (Czech Republic) Cyril Suk (quarterfinals)
3. (Australia) Joshua Eagle / (Australia) Andrew Florent (first round)
4. (France) **Olivier Delaître** / (France) **Fabrice Santoro (champions)**

== Draw ==
=== Key ===
- Q = Qualifier
- WC = Wild card
- LL = Lucky loser
- Alt = Alternate
- ITF = ITF entry
- PR = Protected ranking
- SR = Special ranking
- SE = Special exempt
- JE = Junior exempt
- JR = Junior Accelerator Programme entrant
- CO = College Accelerator Programme entrant
- NG = Next Gen Accelerator Program entrant
- w/o = Walkover
- r = Retired
- d = Defaulted

=== Finals ===
First round
1	(South Africa) **E Ferreira** **(United States) R Leach**	**7**	**7**
(South Africa) D Adams (Netherlands) T Kempers	6	5
(Sweden) **N Kulti** **(Australia) D Macpherson**	**6**	**6**
(South Africa) J-L de Jager (South Africa) R Koenig	4	4
4	(France) **O Delaître** **(France) F Santoro**	**6**	**6**
WC	(Germany) N Kiefer (Switzerland) M Rosset	4	2
(Russia) **Y Kafelnikov** **(Czech Republic) D Vacek**	**7**	**6**
WC	(Switzerland) R Federer (Switzerland) I Heuberger	5	2
WC	(Germany) **B Becker** **(Germany) T Haas**	**6**	**7**
(United Kingdom) N Broad (South Africa) C Haggard	2	6
(Spain) **T Carbonell** **(Spain) F Roig**	2	**7**	**6**
3	(Australia) J Eagle (Australia) A Florent	**6**	5	4
(South Africa) **P Norval** **(South Africa) K Ullyett**	6	**6**	**7**
(South Africa) W Ferreira (Australia) P Rafter	**7**	2	6
2	(Czechoslovakia) **M Damm** **(Czech Republic) C Suk**	**6**	3	**6**
Q	(Netherlands) M Oosting (Czech Republic) P Vízner	3	**6**	3

Quarterfinals
1	(South Africa) DE Ferreira (United States) R Leach	4	**7**	2
(Sweden) **N Kulti** **(Australia) D Macpherson**	**6**	6	**6**
4	(France) **O Delaître** **(France) F Santoro**	**7**	1	**6**
(Russia) Y Kafelnikov (Czech Republic) D Vacek	6	**6**	4
WC	(Germany) **B Becker** **(Germany) T Haas**	**6**	0	**6**
(Spain) T Carbonell (Spain) F Roig	3	**6**	4
(South Africa) **P Norval** **(South Africa) K Ullyett**	**6**	**6**
2	(Czechoslovakia) M Damm (Czech Republic) C Suk	4	3

Semifinals
(Sweden) N Kulti (Australia) D Macpherson	5	**6**	1
4	(France) **O Delaître** **(France) F Santoro**	**7**	3	**6**
WC	(Germany) B Becker (Germany) T Haas	**6**	3	4
(South Africa) **P Norval** **(South Africa) K Ullyett**	4	**6**	**6**

Final
4	(France) **O Delaître** **(France) F Santoro**	**6**	**7**
(South Africa) P Norval (South Africa) K Ullyett	3	6
