= 1995 Davidoff Swiss Indoors =

- Date: 25 September – 1 October
- Edition: 26th
- Category: World Series
- Draw: 32S / 16D
- Prize money: $975,000
- Surface: Carpet / indoor
- Location: Basel, Switzerland
- Venue: St. Jakobshalle

Champions

Singles
- (United States) Jim Courier

Doubles
- (Czech Republic) Cyril Suk / (Czech Republic) Daniel Vacek
- Swiss Indoors

The 1995 Davidoff Swiss Indoors was a men's tennis tournament played on indoor carpet courts at the St. Jakobshalle in Basel, Switzerland that was part of the World Series of the 1995 ATP Tour. It was the 26th edition of the tournament and was held from 25 September until 1 October 1995. Fifth-seeded Jim Courier won the singles title.

== Finals ==
=== Singles ===
(United States) Jim Courier defeated (Netherlands) Jan Siemerink 6–7^{(2–7)}, 7–6^{(7–5)}, 5–7, 6–2, 7–5

- It was Courier's 4th singles title of the year and the 18th of his career.

=== Doubles ===
(Czech Republic) Cyril Suk / (Czech Republic) Daniel Vacek defeated (United States) Mark Keil / (Sweden) Peter Nyborg 3–6, 6–3, 6–3
