= 1995 Davidoff Swiss Indoors – Singles =

Singles
- 1995 Davidoff Swiss Indoors

Final
- Champion: (United States) Jim Courier
- Runner-up: (Netherlands) Jan Siemerink
- Score: 6–7^{(2–7)}, 7–6^{(7–5)}, 5–7, 6–2, 7–5

Details
- Draw: 32 (2WC/4Q/1LL)
- Seeds: 8

Events
Singles	Doubles
← 1994 ·	Swiss Indoors	· 1996 →

Wayne Ferreira was the defending champion, but lost in the first round to Anders Järryd.

Jim Courier won the title by defeating Jan Siemerink 6–7^{(2–7)}, 7–6^{(7–5)}, 5–7, 6–2, 7–5 in the final.

== Seeds ==
1. (Germany) Boris Becker (semifinals, withdrew)
2. (Russia) Yevgeny Kafelnikov (second round)
3. (n/a)
4. (Sweden) Thomas Enqvist (second round)
5. (United States) Jim Courier (champion)
6. (Switzerland) Marc Rosset (first round)
7. (South Africa) Wayne Ferreira (first round)
8. (Sweden) Stefan Edberg (quarterfinals)

== Draw ==
=== Key ===
- Q = Qualifier
- WC = Wild card
- LL = Lucky loser
- Alt = Alternate
- SE = Special exempt
- PR = Protected ranking
- ITF = ITF entry
- JE = Junior exempt
- w/o = Walkover
- r = Retired
- d = Defaulted
- SR = Special ranking

=== Finals ===
Semifinals
1	(Germany) Boris Becker
(Netherlands) Jan Siemerink	w/o
5	(United States) Jim Courier	6	6
(United Kingdom) Greg Rusedski	4	4

Final
(Netherlands) Jan Siemerink	7^{7}	6^{5}	7	2	5
5	(United States) Jim Courier	6^{2}	7^{7}	5	6	7

=== Top half ===
First round
1	(Germany) B Becker	6	6
(Zimbabwe) B Black	4	3
WC	(France) Y Noah	6	7^{9}
(Germany) M Sinner	3	6^{7}
(Czech Republic) D Vacek	7	6
(Russia) A Volkov	5	2
(France) C Pioline	5	6	2
8	(Sweden) S Edberg	7	4	6
4	(Sweden) T Enqvist	6	6
(Australia) T Woodbridge	2	3
(Netherlands) J Siemerink	6	6
(Norway) C Ruud	4	3
(Germany) D Prinosil	3	6	6
Q	(France) G Raoux	6	3	4
(Czech Republic) P Korda	7^{8}	6
6	(Switzerland) M Rosset	6^{6}	3

Second round
1	(Germany) B Becker	6	7
WC	(France) Y Noah	4	5
(Czech Republic) D Vacek	2	7^{7}	4
8	(Sweden) S Edberg	6	6^{4}	6
4	(Sweden) T Enqvist	2	2
(Netherlands) J Siemerink	6	6
(Germany) D Prinosil	2	6^{4}
(Czech Republic) P Korda	6	7^{7}

Quarterfinals
1	(Germany) B Becker	6	3	6
8	(Sweden) S Edberg	4	6	3
(Netherlands) J Siemerink	3	7^{7}	7
(Czech Republic) P Korda	6	6^{4}	5

Semifinals
1	(Germany) B Becker
(Netherlands) J Siemerink	w/o

=== Bottom half ===
First round
5	(United States) J Courier	6	6
(Slovakia) K Kučera	4	2
Q	(Germany) J Renzenbrink	6	6^{4}	3
Q	(France) L Roux	4	7^{7}	6
(Czech Republic) M Damm	3	6	7^{7}
(France) O Delaître	6	3	6^{4}
(France) A Boetsch	3	6^{6}
LL	(Sweden) H Holm	6	7^{8}
7	(South Africa) W Ferreira	6^{4}	6	0
(Sweden) A Järryd	7^{7}	2	6
WC	(Switzerland) J Hlasek	6^{2}	3
(United Kingdom) G Rusedski	7^{7}	6
Q	(Australia) J Stoltenberg	6	6
(Sweden) M Wilander	2	2
(France) G Forget	7^{8}	4	4
2	(Russia) Y Kafelnikov	6^{6}	6	6

Second round
5	(United States) J Courier	7	7^{7}
Q	(France) L Roux	5	6^{2}
(Czech Republic) M Damm	7^{7}	6
LL	(Sweden) H Holm	6^{1}	4
(Sweden) A Järryd	6^{4}	6^{3}
(United Kingdom) G Rusedski	7^{7}	7^{7}
Q	(Australia) J Stoltenberg	6	6
2	(Russia) Y Kafelnikov	3	3

Quarterfinals
5	(United States) J Courier	7^{7}	7^{7}
(Czech Republic) M Damm	6^{5}	6^{3}
(United Kingdom) G Rusedski	3	6	6
Q	(Australia) J Stoltenberg	6	3	2

Semifinals
5	(United States) J Courier	6	6
(United Kingdom) G Rusedski	4	4
