= 1996 Davidoff Swiss Indoors – Doubles =

Doubles
- 1996 Davidoff Swiss Indoors

Final
- Champions: (Russia) Yevgeny Kafelnikov (Czech Republic) Daniel Vacek
- Runners-up: (South Africa) David Adams (Netherlands) Menno Oosting
- Score: 6–3, 6–4

Details
- Draw: 16
- Seeds: 4

Events
Singles	Doubles
← 1995 ·	Swiss Indoors	· 1997 →

Cyril Suk and Daniel Vacek were the defending champions but they competed with different partners that year, Suk with Petr Korda and Vacek with Yevgeny Kafelnikov.

Korda and Suk lost in the quarterfinals to Jonas Björkman and Jakob Hlasek.

Kafelnikov and Vacek won in the final 6–3, 6–4 against David Adams and Menno Oosting.

== Seeds ==
Champion seeds are indicated in bold text while text in italics indicates the round in which those seeds were eliminated.

1. (Sweden) Jonas Björkman / (Switzerland) Jakob Hlasek (semifinals)
2. (Russia) **Yevgeny Kafelnikov** / (Czech Republic) **Daniel Vacek (champions)**
3. (South Africa) Ellis Ferreira / (Netherlands) Jan Siemerink (quarterfinals)
4. (Belgium) Libor Pimek / (South Africa) Byron Talbot (quarterfinals)

== Draw ==
=== Key ===
- Q = Qualifier
- WC = Wild card
- LL = Lucky loser
- Alt = Alternate
- SE = Special exempt
- PR = Protected ranking
- ITF = ITF entry
- JE = Junior exempt
- w/o = Walkover
- r = Retired
- d = Defaulted
- SR = Special ranking

First round
1	(Sweden) **J Björkman** (Switzerland) **J Hlasek**	**6**	**6**
(United Kingdom) N Broad (South Africa) P Norval	4	4
WC	(United States) M Keil (United States) C Woodruff	4	3
(Czech Republic) **P Korda** (Czech Republic) **C Suk**	**6**	**6**
4	(Belgium) **L Pimek** (South Africa) **B Talbot**	3	**6**	**6**
WC	(Switzerland) G Bastl (Switzerland) M Kratochvil	**6**	2	2
WC	(Australia) M Philippoussis (Switzerland) M Rosset	**7**	6	4
(South Africa) **D Adams** (Netherlands) **M Oosting**	5	**7**	**6**
(Sweden) **D Ekerot** (United States) **J Tarango**	**6**	**7**
(South Africa) M Barnard (Sweden) P Nyborg	2	6
(Czech Republic) J Novák (Czech Republic) P Vízner	3	6
3	(South Africa) **E Ferreira** (Netherlands) **J Siemerink**	**6**	**7**
(United States) J Grabb (United States) R Reneberg	6	4
(Germany) **M-K Goellner** (Germany) **D Prinosil**	**7**	**6**
Q	(Austria) G Mandl (Germany) L Rehmann	3	0
2	(Russia) **Y Kafelnikov** (Czech Republic) **D Vacek**	**6**	**6**

Quarterfinals
1	(Sweden) **J Björkman** (Switzerland) **J Hlasek**	**6**	**7**
(Czech Republic) P Korda (Czech Republic) C Suk	3	5
4	(Belgium) L Pimek (South Africa) B Talbot	**6**	4	2
(South Africa) **D Adams** (Netherlands) **M Oosting**	4	**6**	**6**
(Sweden) **D Ekerot** (United States) **J Tarango**	3	**6**	**6**
3	(South Africa) E Ferreira (Netherlands) J Siemerink	**6**	2	3
(Germany) M-K Goellner (Germany) D Prinosil	3	**7**	1
2	(Russia) **Y Kafelnikov** (Czech Republic) **D Vacek**	**6**	6	**6**

Semifinals
1	(Sweden) J Björkman (Switzerland) J Hlasek	3	**7**	3
(South Africa) **D Adams** (Netherlands) **M Oosting**	**6**	6	**6**
(Sweden) D Ekerot (United States) J Tarango	2	2
2	(Russia) **Y Kafelnikov** (Czech Republic) **D Vacek**	**6**	**6**

Final
(South Africa) David Adams (Netherlands) Menno Oosting	3	4
2	(Russia) **Yevgeny Kafelnikov** (Czech Republic) **Daniel Vacek**	**6**	**6**
