= 1997 Davidoff Swiss Indoors – Doubles =

Doubles
- 1997 Davidoff Swiss Indoors

Final
- Champions: (United Kingdom) Tim Henman (Switzerland) Marc Rosset
- Runners-up: (Germany) Karsten Braasch (United States) Jim Grabb
- Score: 7–6, 6–7, 7–6

Details
- Draw: 16
- Seeds: 4

Events
Singles	Doubles
← 1996 ·	Swiss Indoors	· 1998 →

Yevgeny Kafelnikov and Daniel Vacek were the defending champions, but lost in the quarterfinals to Karsten Braasch and Jim Grabb.

Tim Henman and Marc Rosset won the title by defeating Braasch and Grabb 7–6, 6–7, 7–6 in the final.

== Seeds ==
1. (Netherlands) Jacco Eltingh / (Netherlands) Paul Haarhuis (first round)
2. (Russia) Yevgeny Kafelnikov / (Czech Republic) Daniel Vacek (quarterfinals)
3. (South Africa) David Adams / (Russia) Andrei Olhovskiy (quarterfinals)
4. (United Kingdom) Neil Broad / (South Africa) Piet Norval (first round)

== Draw ==
=== Key ===
- Q = Qualifier
- WC = Wild card
- LL = Lucky loser
- Alt = Alternate
- SE = Special exempt
- PR = Protected ranking
- ITF = ITF entry
- JE = Junior exempt
- w/o = Walkover
- r = Retired
- d = Defaulted
- SR = Special ranking

=== Draw ===
First round
1	(Netherlands) J Eltingh (Netherlands) P Haarhuis	7	4	2
WC	(South Africa) W Ferreira (Croatia) G Ivanišević	6	6	6
(United States) D Johnson (United States) F Montana	6	4
(North Macedonia) A Kitinov (South Africa) B Talbot	7	6
4	(United Kingdom) N Broad (South Africa) P Norval	5	5
WC	(United Kingdom) T Henman (Switzerland) M Rosset	7	7
Q	(Sweden) P Nyborg (Germany) D Prinosil	7	6
WC	(France) A Boetsch (Switzerland) I Heuberger	6	2
(Netherlands) T Kempers (Netherlands) M Oosting	3	6	3
(Czech Republic) P Vízner (Netherlands) F Wibier	6	3	6
(Germany) MK Goellner (New Zealand) B Steven	6	4	6
3	(South Africa) D Adams (Russia) A Olhovskiy	2	6	7
(Sweden) J Apell (Sweden) J Björkman	4	4
(Germany) K Braasch (United States) J Grabb	6	6
(France) O Delaître (United States) J Tarango	6	4	4
2	(Russia) Y Kafelnikov (Czech Republic) D Vacek	4	6	6

Quarterfinals
WC	(South Africa) W Ferreira (Croatia) G Ivanišević	7	2	6
(North Macedonia) A Kitinov (South Africa) B Talbot	6	6	7
WC	(United Kingdom) T Henman (Switzerland) M Rosset	7	6	7
Q	(Sweden) P Nyborg (Germany) D Prinosil	6	7	5
(Czech Republic) P Vízner (Netherlands) F Wibier	7	6
3	(South Africa) D Adams (Russia) A Olhovskiy	6	1
(Germany) K Braasch (United States) J Grabb	7	6
2	(Russia) Y Kafelnikov (Czech Republic) D Vacek	6	3

Semifinals
(North Macedonia) A Kitinov (South Africa) B Talbot	5	3
WC	(United Kingdom) T Henman (Switzerland) M Rosset	7	6
(Czech Republic) P Vízner (Netherlands) F Wibier	4	3
(Germany) K Braasch (United States) J Grabb	6	6

Final
WC	(United Kingdom) T Henman (Switzerland) M Rosset	7	6	7
(Germany) K Braasch (United States) J Grabb	6	7	6
