= 1998 Davidoff Swiss Indoors =

- Date: 5–11 October
- Edition: 29th
- Category: World Series
- Draw: 32S / 16D
- Prize money: $975,000
- Surface: Carpet / indoor
- Location: Basel, Switzerland

Champions

Singles
- (United Kingdom) Tim Henman

Doubles
- (France) Olivier Delaître / (France) Fabrice Santoro
- Swiss Indoors

The 1998 Davidoff Swiss Indoors was a men's tennis tournament played on indoor carpet courts. It was the 29th edition of the event known that year as the Davidoff Swiss Indoors, and was part of the World Series of the 1998 ATP Tour. It took place at the St. Jakobshalle in Basel, Switzerland, from 5 October until 11 October 1998. Sixth-seeded Tim Henman won the singles title.

== Finals ==
=== Singles ===
(United Kingdom) Tim Henman defeated (United States) Andre Agassi 6–4, 6–3, 3–6, 6–4

- It was Henman's 2nd singles title of the year and the 4th of his career.

=== Doubles ===
(France) Olivier Delaître / (France) Fabrice Santoro defeated (South Africa) Piet Norval / (Zimbabwe) Kevin Ullyett, 6–3, 7–6

- It was Delaître's 3rd title of the year and the 11th of his career. It was Santoro's 3rd title of the year and the 4th of his career.
