= Badminton at the 2023 European Para Championships – Men's singles SU5 =

Badminton's men's singles SU5 at the 2023 European Para Championships
- Venue: Rotterdam Ahoy, Rotterdam
- Dates: 15 – 20 August
- Competitors: 14 from 10 nations

Medalists
gold medal	Méril Loquette	France
silver medal	Bartłomiej Mróz	Poland
bronze medal	İlker Tuzcu	Turkey
bronze medal	Robert Donald	Great Britain

The men's singles SU5 badminton tournament at the 2023 European Para Championships was played from 15 to 20 August 2023 in Rotterdam Ahoy, Rotterdam. A total of 14 players competed at the tournament, four of whom was seeded.

== Competition schedule ==
Play took place between 15 and 20 August.

GS	Group stage	¼	Quarterfinals	½	Semifinals	F	Final

Events	Tue 15	Wed 16	Thu 17	Fri 18	Sat 19	Sun 20
Men's singles SU5	GS	GS	GS	¼	½	F

== Seeds ==
The following players were seeded:

1. Méril Loquette (FRA) (champion; gold medalist)
2. Bartłomiej Mróz (POL) (final; silver medalist)
3. Abdoullah Aït Bella (FRA) (quarter-finals)
4. Jack Wilson (GBR) (quarter-finals)

== Group stage ==
=== Group A ===
Pos	Team	Pld	W	L	GF	GA	GD	PF	PA	PD	Qualification
1	Méril Loquette (FRA) [1]	2	2	0	4	0	+4	84	47	+37	Qualification to elimination stage
2	Robert Donald (GBR)	2	1	1	2	2	0	73	56	+17	Qualification to elimination stage
3	Filip Rataj (CZE)	2	0	2	0	4	−4	30	84	−54	

Source: Group A – standings

Date		Score		Game 1	Game 2	Game 3
15 August	Méril Loquette (France)	2–0	(Czech Republic) Filip Rataj	21–9	21–7	
16 August	Méril Loquette (France)	2–0	(United Kingdom) Robert Donald	21–19	21–12	
17 August	Filip Rataj (Czech Republic)	0–2	(United Kingdom) Robert Donald	6–21	8–21	

=== Group B ===
Pos	Team	Pld	W	L	GF	GA	GD	PF	PA	PD	Qualification
1	Bartłomiej Mróz (POL) [2]	2	2	0	4	0	+4	84	31	+53	Qualification to elimination stage
2	Ibrahim Aliyev (AZE)	2	1	1	2	2	0	58	65	−7	Qualification to elimination stage
3	Manuel García (ESP)	2	0	2	0	4	−4	38	84	−46	

Source: Group B – standings

Date		Score		Game 1	Game 2	Game 3
15 August	Bartłomiej Mróz (Poland)	2–0	(Spain) Manuel García	21–8	21–7	
16 August	Bartłomiej Mróz (Poland)	2–0	(Azerbaijan) Ibrahim Aliyev	21–9	21–7	
17 August	Manuel García (Spain)	0–2	(Azerbaijan) Ibrahim Aliyev	14–21	9–21	

=== Group C ===
Pos	Team	Pld	W	L	GF	GA	GD	PF	PA	PD	Qualification
1	Abdoullah Aït Bella (FRA) [3/4]	3	3	0	6	2	+4	163	134	+29	Qualification to elimination stage
2	Burak May (TUR)	3	2	1	5	3	+2	170	156	+14	Qualification to elimination stage
3	Sean O'Sullivan (GBR)	3	1	2	2	4	−2	105	117	−12	
4	Joshua Donker (NED) (H)	3	0	3	2	6	−4	143	174	−31	

Source: Group C – standings
(H) Host

Date		Score		Game 1	Game 2	Game 3
15 August	Abdoullah Aït Bella (France)	2–1	(Turkey) Burak May	21–19	18–21	21–17
15 August	Joshua Donker (Netherlands)	0–2	(United Kingdom) Sean O'Sullivan	19–21	14–21	
16 August	Abdoullah Aït Bella (France)	2–1	(Netherlands) Joshua Donker	21–12	19–21	21–17
16 August	Burak May (Turkey)	2–0	(United Kingdom) Sean O'Sullivan	21–18	21–18	
17 August	Burak May (Turkey)	2–1	(Netherlands) Joshua Donker	21–14	29–30	21–16
17 August	Abdoullah Aït Bella (France)	2–0	(United Kingdom) Sean O'Sullivan	21–13	21–14	

=== Group D ===
Pos	Team	Pld	W	L	GF	GA	GD	PF	PA	PD	Qualification
1	İlker Tuzcu (TUR)	3	3	0	6	1	+5	142	89	+53	Qualification to elimination stage
2	Jack Wilson (GBR) [3/4]	3	2	1	5	2	+3	140	94	+46	Qualification to elimination stage
3	Pablo Serrano (ESP)	3	1	2	2	4	−2	92	99	−7	
4	Ilyas Hussain (IRL)	3	0	3	0	6	−6	34	126	−92	

Source: Group A – standings

Date		Score		Game 1	Game 2	Game 3
15 August	Jack Wilson (United Kingdom)	2–0	(Spain) Pablo Serrano	21–12	21–15	
15 August	Ilyas Hussain (Republic of Ireland)	0–2	(Turkey) İlker Tuzcu	6–21	4–21	
16 August	Jack Wilson (United Kingdom)	2–0	(Republic of Ireland) Ilyas Hussain	21–4	21–5	
16 August	Pablo Serrano (Spain)	0–2	(Turkey) İlker Tuzcu	10–21	13–21	
17 August	Jack Wilson (United Kingdom)	1–2	(Turkey) İlker Tuzcu	21–16	19–21	16–21
17 August	Pablo Serrano (Spain)	2–0	(Republic of Ireland) Ilyas Hussain	21–4	21–11	

== Elimination stage ==
Quarter-finals
1	Méril Loquette (FRA)	23	21
3/4	Jack Wilson (GBR)	21	14
İlker Tuzcu (TUR)	21	21
Ibrahim Aliyev (AZE)	7	12
Robert Donald (GBR)	23	21	21
3/4	Abdoullah Aït Bella (FRA)	25	4	14
Burak May (TUR)	14	11
2	Bartłomiej Mróz (POL)	21	21

Semi-finals
1	Méril Loquette (FRA)	21	15	21
İlker Tuzcu (TUR)	15	21	15
Robert Donald (GBR)	14	8
2	Bartłomiej Mróz (POL)	21	21

Final
1	Méril Loquette (FRA)	21	21
2	Bartłomiej Mróz (POL)	11	13
