= 1995 Davidoff Swiss Indoors – Doubles =

Doubles
- 1995 Davidoff Swiss Indoors

Final
- Champions: (Czech Republic) Cyril Suk (Czech Republic) Daniel Vacek
- Runners-up: (United States) Mark Keil (Sweden) Peter Nyborg
- Score: 3–6, 6–3, 6–3

Details
- Draw: 16
- Seeds: 4

Events
Singles	Doubles
← 1994 ·	Swiss Indoors	· 1996 →

Patrick McEnroe and Jared Palmer were the defending champions, but none competed this year.

Cyril Suk and Daniel Vacek won the title by defeating Mark Keil and Peter Nyborg 3–6, 6–3, 6–3 in the final.

== Seeds ==
1. (Czech Republic) Cyril Suk / (Czech Republic) Daniel Vacek (champions)
2. (United States) Rick Leach / (United States) Scott Melville (semifinals)
3. (South Africa) David Adams / (Zimbabwe) Byron Black (first round)
4. (South Africa) Lan Bale / (South Africa) John-Laffnie de Jager (first round)

== Draw ==
=== Key ===
- Q = Qualifier
- WC = Wild card
- LL = Lucky loser
- Alt = Alternate
- SE = Special exempt
- PR = Protected ranking
- ITF = ITF entry
- JE = Junior exempt
- w/o = Walkover
- r = Retired
- d = Defaulted
- SR = Special ranking

=== Draw ===
First round
1	(Czech Republic) C Suk (Czech Republic) D Vacek	2	7	6
Q	(Netherlands) S Groen (United Kingdom) G Rusedski	6	6	4
(South Africa) W Ferreira (Russia) Y Kafelnikov	2	4
(Czech Republic) P Korda (Germany) D Prinosil	6	6
3	(South Africa) D Adams (Zimbabwe) B Black	6	3
(United Kingdom) N Broad (South Africa) G Muller	7	6
(Sweden) H Holm (Netherlands) M Oosting	6	3	6
WC	(Switzerland) J Hlasek (France) Y Noah	3	6	3
(United States) M Keil (Sweden) P Nyborg	6	3	7
(South Africa) E Ferreira (Netherlands) J Siemerink	2	6	6
(Czech Republic) M Damm (Sweden) A Järryd	7	7
4	(South Africa) L Bale (South Africa) JL de Jager	6	5
WC	(Germany) B Becker (Germany) P Kühnen	7	6
(France) O Delaître (France) G Raoux	5	2
LL	(Czech Republic) V Flégl (North Macedonia) A Kitinov	4	1
2	(United States) R Leach (United States) S Melville	6	6

Quarterfinals
1	(Czech Republic) C Suk (Czech Republic) D Vacek	6	6
(Czech Republic) P Korda (Germany) D Prinosil	1	4
(United Kingdom) N Broad (South Africa) G Muller	4	4
(Sweden) H Holm (Netherlands) M Oosting	6	6
(United States) M Keil (Sweden) P Nyborg	6	7	6
(Czech Republic) M Damm (Sweden) A Järryd	7	6	3
WC	(Germany) B Becker (Germany) P Kühnen	6	2	5
2	(United States) R Leach (United States) S Melville	4	6	7

Semifinals
1	(Czech Republic) C Suk (Czech Republic) D Vacek	6	6
(Sweden) H Holm (Netherlands) M Oosting	3	3
(United States) M Keil (Sweden) P Nyborg	6	7
2	(United States) R Leach (United States) S Melville	3	6

Final
1	(Czech Republic) C Suk (Czech Republic) D Vacek	3	6	6
(United States) M Keil (Sweden) P Nyborg	6	3	3
