= 1996 Davidoff Swiss Indoors =

- Date: 23–29 September
- Edition: 27th
- Category: World Series
- Draw: 32S / 16D
- Prize money: $975,000
- Location: Basel, Switzerland
- Venue: St. Jakobshalle

Champions

Singles
- (United States) Pete Sampras

Doubles
- (Russia) Yevgeny Kafelnikov / (Czech Republic) Daniel Vacek
- Swiss Indoors

The 1996 Davidoff Swiss Indoors was a men's tennis tournament played on indoor hard courts at the St. Jakobshalle in Basel in Switzerland and was part of the World Series of the 1996 ATP Tour. The tournament ran from 23 September through 29 September 1996. First-seeded Pete Sampras won the singles title.

== Finals ==
=== Singles ===
(United States) Pete Sampras defeated (Germany) Hendrik Dreekmann 7–5, 6–2, 6–0

- It was Sampras' 7th title of the year and the 45th of his career.

=== Doubles ===
(Russia) Yevgeny Kafelnikov / (Czech Republic) Daniel Vacek defeated (South Africa) David Adams / (Netherlands) Menno Oosting 6–3, 6–4

- It was Kafelnikov's 7th title of the year and the 22nd of his career. It was Vacek's 3rd title of the year and the 13th of his career.
