= 1996 Davidoff Swiss Indoors – Singles =

Singles
- 1996 Davidoff Swiss Indoors
- 1995 Champion: (United States) Jim Courier

Final
- Champion: (United States) Pete Sampras
- Runner-up: (Germany) Hendrik Dreekmann
- Score: 7–5, 6–0, 6–2

Details
- Draw: 32
- Seeds: 8

Events
Singles	Doubles
← 1995 ·	Swiss Indoors	· 1997 →

Jim Courier was the defending champion but did not compete that year.

Pete Sampras won in the final 7–5, 6–0, 6–2 against Hendrik Dreekmann.

== Seeds ==
A champion seed is indicated in bold text while text in italics indicates the round in which that seed was eliminated.

1. (United States) **Pete Sampras (champion)**
2. (Croatia) Goran Ivanišević (first round)
3. (Russia) Yevgeny Kafelnikov (semifinals)
4. (Germany) Boris Becker (second round)
5. (Sweden) Thomas Enqvist (first round)
6. (Sweden) Stefan Edberg (second round)
7. (Australia) Mark Philippoussis (first round)
8. (Germany) Michael Stich (first round)

== Draw ==
=== Key ===
- Q = Qualifier
- WC = Wild card
- LL = Lucky loser
- Alt = Alternate
- SE = Special exempt
- PR = Protected ranking
- ITF = ITF entry
- JE = Junior exempt
- w/o = Walkover
- r = Retired
- d = Defaulted
- SR = Special ranking
- NB: The Final was the best of 5 sets while all other rounds were the best of 3 sets.

=== Final ===
Final
1	(United States) **Pete Sampras**	**7**	**6**	**6**
	(Germany) Hendrik Dreekmann	5	0	2

=== Section 1 ===
First round
1	(United States) **P Sampras**	5	**6**	**7**
Q	(Germany) A Rădulescu	**7**	3	5
(Switzerland) J Hlasek	6^{4}	3
WC	(Germany) **T Haas**	**7^{7}**	**6**
(Sweden) **M Tillström**	**7^{7}**	**7**
(Belgium) F Dewulf	6^{2}	5
(Sweden) **J Björkman**	**6**	4	**7**
7	(Australia) M Philippoussis	1	**6**	5
3	(Russia) **Y Kafelnikov**	**6**	6^{6}	**6**
(Switzerland) M Rosset	3	**7^{8}**	3
(United States) C Woodruff	3	**6**	5
Q	(France) **L Roux**	**6**	4	**7**
LL	(Germany) **M-K Goellner**	6^{4}	**6**	**6**
(France) G Forget	**7^{7}**	4	4
(Netherlands) J Siemerink	3	**7**	3
6	(Sweden) **S Edberg**	**6**	5	**6**

Second round
1	(United States) **P Sampras**	**6**	2	**6**
WC	(Germany) T Haas	4	**6**	3
(Sweden) **M Tillström**	3	**6**	**6**
(Sweden) J Björkman	**6**	3	3
3	(Russia) **Y Kafelnikov**	4	**6**	**6**
Q	(France) L Roux	**6**	3	4
LL	(Germany) **M-K Goellner**	**7^{9}**	**6**
6	(Sweden) S Edberg	6^{7}	2

Quarterfinals
1	(United States) **P Sampras**	**6**	**6**
(Sweden) M Tillström	3	4
3	(Russia) **Y Kafelnikov**	5	**6**	**6**
LL	(Germany) M-K Goellner	**7**	4	2

Semifinals
1	(United States) **P Sampras**	**7^{7}**	**6**
3	(Russia) Y Kafelnikov	6^{4}	3

=== Section 2 ===
First round
5	(Sweden) T Enqvist	1	6^{2}
Q	(France) **O Delaître**	**6**	**7^{7}**
(Czech Republic) D Vacek	**7^{7}**	3	2
(Italy) **R Furlan**	6^{4}	**6**	**6**
(Czech Republic) **J Novák**	**6**	2	**6**
WC	(Switzerland) F Veglio	4	**6**	2
(Czech Republic) B Ulihrach	1	**7**	3
4	(Germany) **B Becker**	**6**	5	**6**
8	(Germany) M Stich	**7^{7}**	4	1
(Germany) **H Dreekmann**	6^{4}	**6**	**6**
(Sweden) **M Larsson**	**6**	3	**6**
(Morocco) Y El Aynaoui	3	**6**	4
(United States) R Reneberg	5	4
(Czech Republic) **P Korda**	**7**	**6**
Q	(Germany) **D Prinosil**	**7^{7}**	**6**
2	(Croatia) G Ivanišević	6^{3}	4

Second round
Q	(France) **O Delaître**	1	**6**	**6**
(Italy) R Furlan	**6**	1	2
(Czech Republic) **J Novák**	**6**	**7^{7}**
4	(Germany) B Becker	3	6^{4}
(Germany) **H Dreekmann**	**7^{7}**	**6**
(Sweden) M Larsson	6^{5}	3
(Czech Republic) **P Korda**	**6**	**6**
Q	(Germany) D Prinosil	4	2

Quarterfinals
Q	(France) O Delaître	**6**	5	2
(Czech Republic) **J Novák**	4	**7**	**6**
(Germany) **H Dreekmann**	**7^{8}**	**6**
(Czech Republic) P Korda	6^{6}	4

Semifinals
(Czech Republic) J Novák	5	4
(Germany) **H Dreekmann**	**7**	**6**
