= List of cities hosting Taizé meetings =

Every year the Communauté de Taizé organises a European Youth Meeting for young adults. These meetings take place in a European city, usually between 28 December and 1 January in any given year.

During the meeting the location of the next European Youth Meeting is announced.

== European young adults meeting ==
- 1978 – Paris, France
- 1979 – Barcelona, Spain
- 1980 – Rome, Italy
- 1981 – London, United Kingdom
- 1982 – Rome, Italy
- 1983 – Paris, France
- 1984 – Cologne, Germany
- 1985 – Barcelona, Spain
- 1986 – London, United Kingdom
- 1987 – Rome, Italy
- 1988 – Paris, France
- 1989 – Wrocław, Poland
- 1990 – Prague, Czechoslovakia
- 1991 – Budapest, Hungary
- 1992 – Vienna, Austria
- 1993 – Munich, Germany
- 1994 – Paris, France
- 1995 – Wrocław, Poland
- 1996 – Stuttgart, Germany
- 1997 – Vienna, Austria
- 1998 – Milan, Italy
- 1999 – Warsaw, Poland
- 2000 – Barcelona, Spain
- 2001 – Budapest, Hungary
- 2002 – Paris, France
- 2003 – Hamburg, Germany
- 2004 – Lisbon, Portugal
- 2005 – Milan, Italy
- 2006 – Zagreb, Croatia
- 2007 – Geneva, Switzerland
- 2008 – Brussels, Belgium
- 2009 – Poznań, Poland
- 2010 – Rotterdam, Netherlands
- 2011 – Berlin, Germany
- 2012 – Rome, Italy
- 2013 – Strasbourg, France
- 2014 – Prague, Czech Republic
- 2015 – Valencia, Spain
- 2016 – Riga, Latvia
- 2017 – Basel, Switzerland
- 2018 – Madrid, Spain
- 2019 – Wrocław, Poland
- 2020 – Turin, Italy (cancelled because of COVID-19 and conducted online from Taizé)
- 2021 – Turin, Italy
- 2022 – Rostock, Germany
- 2023 – Ljubljana, Slovenia
- 2024 – Tallinn, Estonia
- 2025 – Paris, France
- 2026 – Łódź, Poland

== International young adults meeting ==
- 1986 – Madras, India
- 1991 – Manila, Philippines
- 2006 – Kolkata, India
- 2007 – Cochabamba, Bolivia
- 2008 – Nairobi, Kenya
- 2009 – Vilnius, Lithuania
- 2010 – Manila, Philippines
- 2010 – Santiago, Chile
- 2012 – Kigali, Rwanda
- 2012 – Chicago, Illinois, United States
- 2013 – Red Shirt, Pine Ridge Indian Reservation, South Dakota, United States
- 2014 – Mexico City, Mexico
- 2016 – Cotonou, Benin
- 2017 – St. Louis, Missouri, United States
- 2018 – Hong Kong, China
- 2019 – Cape Town, South Africa
- 2022 – Holy Land

== See also ==
- Taizé Community
