= 1998 Davidoff Swiss Indoors – Singles =

Singles
- 1998 Davidoff Swiss Indoors

Final
- Champion: (United Kingdom) Tim Henman
- Runner-up: (United States) Andre Agassi
- Score: 6–4, 6–3, 3–6, 6–4

Details
- Draw: 32
- Seeds: 8

Events
Singles	Doubles
- Swiss Indoors

Greg Rusedski was the defending champion, but lost in the second round to David Prinosil.

Tim Henman won the title, defeating Andre Agassi 6–4, 6–3, 3–6, 6–4 in the final.

== Seeds ==
A champion seed is indicated in bold text while text in italics indicates the round in which that seed was eliminated.

1. (United States) Pete Sampras (first round)
2. (Australia) Patrick Rafter (first round)
3. (Czech Republic) Petr Korda (first round)
4. (United States) Andre Agassi (final)
5. (Russia) Yevgeny Kafelnikov (second round)
6. (United Kingdom) **Tim Henman (champion)**
7. (United Kingdom) Greg Rusedski (second round)
8. (Netherlands) Jan Siemerink (first round)

== Draw ==
Key

- Q = Qualifier
- WC = Wild card
- LL = Lucky loser
- Alt = Alternate
- ITF = ITF entry
- PR = Protected ranking
- SR = Special ranking
- SE = Special exempt
- JE = Junior exempt
- JR = Junior Accelerator Programme entrant
- CO = College Accelerator Programme entrant
- NG = Next Gen Accelerator Program entrant
- w/o = Walkover
- r = Retired
- d = Defaulted

=== Finals ===
Semifinals
(Switzerland) Marc Rosset	4	2
4	**(United States) Andre Agassi**	**6**	**6**
6	**(United Kingdom) Tim Henman**	**6**	2	**7^{7}**
(Sweden) Thomas Johansson	3	**6**	6^{5}

Final
4	(United States) Andre Agassi	4	3	**6**	4
6	**(United Kingdom) Tim Henman**	**6**	**6**	3	**6**

=== Top half ===
First round
1/WC	(United States) P Sampras	**6**	6^{4}	3
**(South Africa) W Ferreira**	4	**7^{7}**	**6**
**(Switzerland) M Rosset**	**7^{7}**	4	**7^{7}**
(Germany) T Haas	6^{3}	**6**	6^{4}
Q	**(Germany) D Prinosil**	**7^{9}**	**6**
Q	(Czech Republic) P Luxa	6^{7}	4
Q	(Germany) A Pretzsch	2	2
7	**(United Kingdom) G Rusedski**	**6**	**6**
4	**(United States) A Agassi**	**6**	**6**
WC	(Switzerland) R Federer	3	2
(France) J Golmard	0	6^{3}
Q	**(Switzerland) I Heuberger**	**6**	**7^{7}**
**(Sweden) M Gustafsson**	**6**	**6**
(Czech Republic) B Ulihrach	4	4
(Sweden) M Norman	5	3
5	**(Russia) Y Kafelnikov**	**7**	**6**

Second round
(South Africa) W Ferreira	4	0
**(Switzerland) M Rosset**	**6**	**6**
Q	**(Germany) D Prinosil**	**7^{7}**	**7**
7	(United Kingdom) G Rusedski	6^{4}	5
4	**(United States) A Agassi**	**6**	**6**
Q	(Switzerland) I Heuberger	2	2
**(Sweden) M Gustafsson**	3	**6**	**7**
5	(Russia) Y Kafelnikov	**6**	3	5

Quarterfinals
**(Switzerland) M Rosset**	**6**	**7^{7}**
Q	(Germany) D Prinosil	3	6^{2}
4	**(United States) A Agassi**	**6**	**6**
(Sweden) M Gustafsson	3	3

Semifinals
(Switzerland) M Rosset	4	2
4	**(United States) A Agassi**	**6**	**6**

=== Bottom half ===
First round
6	**(United Kingdom) T Henman**	2	**6**	**6**
(Australia) J Stoltenberg	**6**	3	4
**(Morocco) H Arazi**	**6**	**6**
(Australia) R Fromberg	1	4
LL	**(United States) J Tarango**	**6**	**6**
(France) N Escudé	3	3
**(Germany) N Kiefer**	**6**	**6**
3	(Czech Republic) P Korda	2	4
8	(Netherlands) J Siemerink	2	2
**(Zimbabwe) B Black**	**6**	**6**
WC	(Germany) B Becker	3	2
**(Sweden) T Johansson**	**6**	**6**
LL	(Czech Republic) M Damm	3	4
**(France) F Santoro**	**6**	**6**
**(Czech Republic) D Vacek**	**7^{9}**	**7**
2	(Australia) P Rafter	6^{7}	5

Second round
6	**(United Kingdom) T Henman**	**6**	**7^{7}**
(Morocco) H Arazi	4	6^{4}
LL	(United States) J Tarango	**6**	3	2
**(Germany) N Kiefer**	4	**6**	**6**
(Zimbabwe) B Black	**7^{7}**	4	5
**(Sweden) T Johansson**	6^{3}	**6**	**7**
**(France) F Santoro**	3	**6**	**7^{7}**
(Czech Republic) D Vacek	**6**	3	6^{5}

Quarterfinals
6	**(United Kingdom) T Henman**	**6**	**6**
(Germany) N Kiefer	3	4
**(Sweden) T Johansson**	**6**	**6**
(France) F Santoro	3	3

Semifinals
6	**(United Kingdom) T Henman**	**6**	2	**7^{7}**
(Sweden) T Johansson	3	**6**	6^{5}
