= Méril Loquette =

French para-badminton player

Personal information
- Born: 18 December 1996 (age 29) Boulogne-Billancourt, France
- Height: 1.78 m (5 ft 10 in)

Sport
- Country: France
- Sport: Badminton
- Handedness: Left

Men's singles SU5 Men's doubles SL3–SU5 Mixed doubles SL3–SU5
- Highest ranking: 3 (MS 23 August 2023); 4 (MD with Lucas Mazur 1 January 2019); 1 (XD with Coraline Bergeron 23 August 2023)
- Current ranking: 8 (MS); 20 (MD with Lucas Mazur); 17 (XD with Coraline Bergeron) (3 September 2024)
Medal record
Para-badminton
Representing France
European Para Championships
Gold medal – first place	2023 Rotterdam	Men's singles
Gold medal – first place	2023 Rotterdam	Men's doubles
Bronze medal – third place	2023 Rotterdam	Mixed doubles
European Championships
Silver medal – second place	2016 Beek	Men's doubles
Silver medal – second place	2018 Rodez	Men's doubles
Bronze medal – third place	2016 Beek	Men's singles
Bronze medal – third place	2018 Rodez	Men's singles

Méril Loquette (born 18 December 1996) is a French para badminton player who competes in international badminton competitions, he is a double European Para champion in singles and doubles events. He was a former judoka before discovering badminton aged fourteen, he progressed quickly to join the French national badminton team as well as the world rankings. He competed at the 2020 Summer Paralympics where he did not advance to the quarterfinals in the men's singles SU5.

== Achievements ==
=== European Para Championships ===
Men's singles SU5

Year	Venue	Opponent	Score	Result
2023	Rotterdam Ahoy, Rotterdam, Netherlands	(Poland) Bartłomiej Mróz	21–11, 21–13	Gold

Men's doubles SU5

Year	Venue	Partner	Opponent	Score	Result
2023	Rotterdam Ahoy, Rotterdam, Netherlands	(France) Lucas Mazur	(Poland) Bartłomiej Mróz (United Kingdom) Jack Wilson	21–17, 21–15	Gold

Mixed doubles SL3–SU5

Year	Venue	Partner	Opponent	Score	Result
2023	Rotterdam Ahoy, Rotterdam, Netherlands	(France) Coraline Bergeron	(Sweden) Rickard Nilsson (Norway) Helle Sofie Sagøy	18–21, 18–21	Bronze

=== European Championships ===
Men's singles SU5

Year	Venue	Opponent	Score	Result
2016	Sporthal de Haamen, Beek, Netherlands	(Turkey) İlker Tuzcu	12–21, 12–21	Bronze
2018	Amphitheatre Gymnasium, Rodez, France	(Turkey) İlker Tuzcu	15–21, 15–21	Bronze

Men's doubles SL3–SU5

Year	Venue	Partner	Opponent	Score	Result
2016	Sporthal de Haamen, Beek, Netherlands	(Wales) Jack Wilson	(Poland) Bartłomiej Mróz (Turkey) İlker Tuzcu	4–21, 14–21	Silver
2018	Amphitheatre Gymnasium, Rodez, France	(France) Lucas Mazur	(Poland) Bartłomiej Mróz (Turkey) İlker Tuzcu	19–21, 23–25	Bronze

=== BWF Para Badminton World Circuit (2 titles, 8 runners-up) ===
The BWF Para Badminton World Circuit – Grade 2, Level 1, 2 and 3 tournaments has been sanctioned by the Badminton World Federation from 2022.

Men's singles SU5

Year	Tournament	Level	Opponent	Score	Result
2022	Spanish Para Badminton International II	Level 2	(Chinese Taipei) Fang Jen-yu	13–21, 18–21	(silver) Runner-up
2022	Spanish Para Badminton International I	Level 1	(Japan) Taiyo Imai	18–21, 18–21	(silver) Runner-up
2022	Brazil Para Badminton International	Level 2	(Malaysia) Cheah Liek Hou	17–21, 17–21	(silver) Runner-up
2022	Canada Para Badminton International	Level 1	(Chinese Taipei) Fang Jen-yu	13–21, 22–20, 18–21	(silver) Runner-up
2022	Peru Para Badminton International	Level 2	(Poland) Bartłomiej Mróz	23–21, 21–12	(gold) Winner

Men's doubles SU5

Year	Tournament	Level	Partner	Opponent	Score	Result
2022	Spanish Para Badminton International II	Level 2	(France) Abdoullah Ait Bella	(India) Chirag Baretha (India) Raj Kumar	12–21, 10–21	(silver) Runner-up
2022	Brazil Para Badminton International	Level 2	(France) Abdoullah Ait Bella	(India) Hardik Makkar (India) Ruthick Ragupathi	19–21, 15–21	(silver) Runner-up
2022	Thailand Para Badminton International	Level 1	(France) Lucas Mazur	(Malaysia) Cheah Liek Hou (Malaysia) Mohamad Faris Ahmad Azri	12–21, 16–21	(silver) Runner-up
2022	Thailand Para Badminton International	Level 1	(France) Lucas Mazur	(Chinese Taipei) Fang Jen-yu (Chinese Taipei) Pu Gui-yu	21–14, 21–16	(silver) Runner-up
2022	Thailand Para Badminton International	Level 1	(France) Lucas Mazur	(Thailand) Pricha Somsiri (Thailand) Chok-Uthaikul Watcharaphon	20–22, 21–18, 23–21	(silver) Runner-up
2022	Thailand Para Badminton International	Level 1	(France) Lucas Mazur	(South Korea) Kim Gi-yeon (South Korea) Lee Jeong-soo	21–9, 21–6	(silver) Runner-up

Mixed doubles SL3–SU5

Year	Tournament	Level	Partner	Opponent	Score	Result
2022	Peru Para Badminton International	Level 2	(France) Coraline Bergeron	(France) Mathieu Thomas (France) Maud Lefort	14–21, 21–12, 21–16	(gold) Winner
2023	Spanish Para Badminton International I	Level 1	(France) Coraline Bergeron	(France) Lucas Mazur (France) Faustine Noël	17–21, 14–21	(silver) Runner-up

=== International tournaments (from 2011–2021) (2 title, 4 runners-up) ===
Men's singles SU5

Year	Tournament	Opponent	Score	Result
2017	Irish Para Badminton International	(Singapore) Tay Wei Ming	19–21, 14–21	(silver) Runner-up
2019	Canada Para Badminton International	(Indonesia) Dheva Anrimusthi	16–21, 16–21	(silver) Runner-up

Men's doubles SU5

Year	Tournament	Partner	Opponent	Score	Result
2017	Irish Para Badminton International	(Wales) Jack Wilson	(Russia) Oleg Dontsov (Russia) Pavel Kulikov	28–30, 21–19, 23–21	(gold) Winner
2018	Japan Para Badminton International	(France) Lucas Mazur	(Thailand) Pricha Somsiri (Thailand) Chok-Uthaikul Watcharaphon	20–22, 22–20, 15–21	(silver) Runner-up
2020	Peru Para Badminton International	(France) Lucas Mazur	(India) Raj Kumar (India) Rakesh Pandey	18–21, 21–18, 16–21	(silver) Runner-up
2021	Dubai Para Badminton International	(France) Lucas Mazur	(Indonesia) Suryo Nugroho (Indonesia) Fredy Setiawan	21–19, 13–21, 21–19	(gold) Winner
