= Bruno Faria =

Portuguese politician (born 1996)

Member of the Assembly of the Republic
- Incumbent
- Assumed office 3 June 2025
- Constituency: Viseu

Vice President of the Social Democratic Youth
- Incumbent
- Assumed office 23 June 2024
- President: João Pedro Louro

President of the Social Democratic Youth of the Viseu District
- Incumbent
- Assumed office 22 March 2025
- Preceded by: Maria Francisca Damião

President of the Social Democratic Youth of Viseu
- In office 1 April 2023 – 29 March 2025
- Preceded by: Adolfo César Pereira
- Succeeded by: Francisca Almeida

Personal details
- Born: Bruno Alexandre Pereira Ferreira Faria; 7 February 1996 (age 30) Celorico da Beira, Portugal
- Party: Social Democratic Party
- Other political affiliations: Social Democratic Youth
- Education: Polytechnic Institute of Viseu
- Occupation: Public relations executive • Politician

Bruno Alexandre Pereira Ferreira Faria (born 7 February 1996) is a Portuguese politician. As a member of the Social Democratic Party (PSD), he was elected as a deputy to the 17th legislature of the Assembly of the Republic of Portugal in 2025.
