= Badminton at the 2023 European Para Championships – Men's doubles SL3–SL4 =

Badminton's men's doubles SL3–SL4 at the 2023 European Para Championships
- Venue: Rotterdam Ahoy, Rotterdam
- Dates: 15 – 20 August
- Competitors: 16 from 7 nations

Medalists
gold medal	Guillaume Gailly; Mathieu Thomas	France
silver medal	Rickard Nilsson; William Smith	Mixed-NOCs
bronze medal	Mustafa Tuğra Nur; Fuat Soruklu	Turkey
bronze medal	Oleksandr Chyrkov; Dilan Jacobsson	Mixed-NOCs

The men's doubles SL3–SL4 badminton tournament at the 2023 European Para Championships was played from 15 to 20 August 2023 in Rotterdam Ahoy, Rotterdam. A total of 8 pairs competed at the tournament, two of whom was seeded.

== Competition schedule ==
Play took place between 15 and 20 August.

GS	Group stage	½	Semifinals	F	Final

Events	Tue 15	Wed 16	Thu 17	Fri 18	Sat 19	Sun 20
Men's doubles SL3–SL4	GS	GS	GS		½	F

== Seeds ==
The following players were seeded:

1. Guillaume Gailly / Mathieu Thomas (FRA) (champion; gold medalist)
2. Oleksandr Chyrkov (UKR) / Dilan Jacobsson (SWE) (semi-finals; bronze medalist)

== Group stage ==
=== Group A ===
Pos	Team	Pld	W	L	GF	GA	GD	PF	PA	PD	Qualification
1	Guillaume Gailly (FRA) Mathieu Thomas (FRA) [1]	3	3	0	6	0	+6	126	51	+75	Qualification to elimination stage
2	Rickard Nilsson (SWE) William Smith (GBR)	3	2	1	4	2	+2	110	75	+35	Qualification to elimination stage
3	Şükrü Gül (TUR) Dimitar Pavlov (BUL)	3	1	2	2	5	−3	91	140	−49	
4	Dominik Bützberger (SUI) Maurin Stübi (SUI)	3	0	3	1	6	−5	84	145	−61	

Source: Group A – standings

Date		Score		Game 1	Game 2	Game 3
15 August	Dominik Bützberger (Switzerland); Maurin Stübi (Switzerland)	0–2	(Sweden) Rickard Nilsson (United Kingdom) William Smith	9–21	8–21	
15 August	Guillaume Gailly (France); Mathieu Thomas (France)	2–0	(Turkey) Şükrü Gül (Bulgaria) Dimitar Pavlov	21–8	21–6	
16 August	Guillaume Gailly (France); Mathieu Thomas (France)	2–0	(Switzerland) Dominik Bützberger (Switzerland) Maurin Stübi	21–6	21–5	
16 August	Rickard Nilsson (Sweden); William Smith (United Kingdom)	2–0	(Turkey) Şükrü Gül (Bulgaria) Dimitar Pavlov	21–8	21–8	
17 August	Guillaume Gailly (France); Mathieu Thomas (France)	2–0	(Sweden) Rickard Nilsson (United Kingdom) William Smith	21–8	21–18	
17 August	Dominik Bützberger (Switzerland); Maurin Stübi (Switzerland)	1–2	(Turkey) Şükrü Gül (Bulgaria) Dimitar Pavlov	21–19	16–21	19–21

=== Group B ===
Pos	Team	Pld	W	L	GF	GA	GD	PF	PA	PD	Qualification
1	Oleksandr Chyrkov (UKR) Dilan Jacobsson (SWE) [2]	3	3	0	6	0	+6	126	82	+44	Qualification to elimination stage
2	Mustafa Tuğra Nur (TUR) Fuat Soruklu (TUR)	3	2	1	4	3	+1	127	121	+6	Qualification to elimination stage
3	Thomas Numitor (FRA) Clément Sarrobert (FRA)	3	1	2	3	5	−2	129	153	−24	
4	Antony Forster (GBR) Colin Leslie (GBR)	3	0	3	1	6	−5	115	141	−26	

Source: Group B – standings

Date		Score		Game 1	Game 2	Game 3
15 August	Antony Forster (United Kingdom); Colin Leslie (United Kingdom)	0–2	(Turkey) Mustafa Tuğra Nur (Turkey) Fuat Soruklu	13–21	17–21	
15 August	Oleksandr Chyrkov (Ukraine); Dilan Jacobsson (Sweden)	2–0	(France) Thomas Numitor (France) Clément Sarrobert	21–10	21–13	
16 August	Oleksandr Chyrkov (Ukraine); Dilan Jacobsson (Sweden)	2–0	(United Kingdom) Antony Forster (United Kingdom) Colin Leslie	21–18	21–10	
16 August	Mustafa Tuğra Nur (Turkey); Fuat Soruklu (Turkey)	2–1	(France) Thomas Numitor (France) Clément Sarrobert	12–21	21–17	21–11
17 August	Oleksandr Chyrkov (Ukraine); Dilan Jacobsson (Sweden)	2–0	(Turkey) Mustafa Tuğra Nur (Turkey) Fuat Soruklu	21–16	21–15	
17 August	Antony Forster (United Kingdom); Colin Leslie (United Kingdom)	1–2	(France) Thomas Numitor (France) Clément Sarrobert	20–22	21–14	16–21

== Elimination stage ==
Semi-finals
1	Guillaume Gailly (FRA); Mathieu Thomas (FRA)	21	24	21
Mustafa Tuğra Nur (TUR); Fuat Soruklu (TUR)	0	26	14
Rickard Nilsson (SWE); William Smith (GBR)	21	21
2	Oleksandr Chyrkov (UKR); Dilan Jacobsson (SWE)	17	11

Final
1	Guillaume Gailly (FRA); Mathieu Thomas (FRA)	21	17	21
Rickard Nilsson (SWE); William Smith (GBR)	18	21	17
