= St. Jakobshalle =

Event venue in Basel, Switzerland

- Joggelihalle

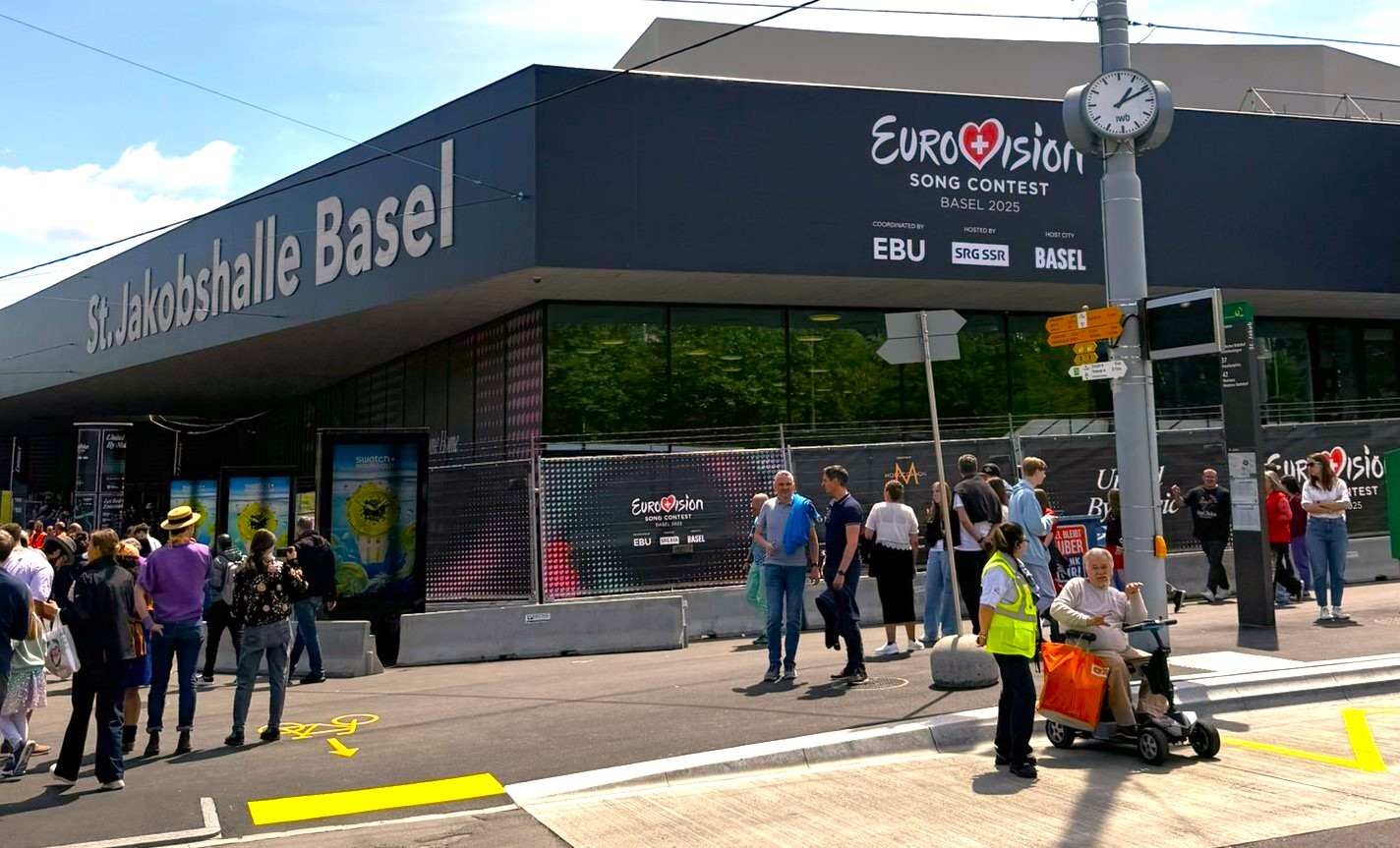
- The exterior of the arena during the Eurovision Song Contest 2025
- Interactive map of St. Jakobshalle
- Address: St. Jakobs-Strasse 390, 4052 Basel (Note: Despite being geographically located in Münchenstein, the venue is officially registered under a Basel address.)
- Location: Münchenstein, Switzerland
- Coordinates: 47°32′23″N 7°37′07″E
- Owner: City of Basel
- Capacity: 8,000 seated, 12,400 with standing (main arena)

Construction
- Groundbreaking: 19 April 1971
- Built: 1971–1975
- Opened: 26 September 1976 (official)
- Renovated: 2015–2018
- Cost: CHF 141 million (renovation only)
- Architects: Giovanni Panozzo; Berrel Kräutler in collaboration with Degelo Architekten (renovation)
- Structural engineers: Albert Schmidt; Ernst Schmidt

Tenant
- EHC Basel (1976–2002)

Website
- www.stjakobshalle.ch

St. Jakobshalle is a multi-purpose indoor arena in the municipality of Münchenstein in Basel-Landschaft, right by the border with Basel-Stadt. Officially opened in September 1976, it is primarily used for hosting indoor sports and concert events. Following a significant renovation, the main arena has a seated capacity of 8,000 people but this can be increased to 12,400 (previously 9,000) when combined with a standing audience.

The building was designed by the architect Giovanni Panozzo and has different sized halls and rooms, which are used for all types of events. It is the home of the Swiss Indoors men's tennis and Swiss Open badminton tournaments.

== Location ==
The venue is part of a multi-venue sports and leisure complex that is largely owned by the City of Basel, which also manages and operates the facilities. Next to the venue is St. Jakob Arena, an indoor ice rink; on the opposite side of the street (on Basel-Stadt soil) is the St. Jakob-Park, the largest football stadium in Switzerland. Other venues include a number of playing fields and courts, outdoor swimming pools and an equestrian center. Adjoining it is the St. Jakob Sports University, which houses the Department of Sport, Exercise and Health of the University of Basel.

== History ==
=== Construction ===
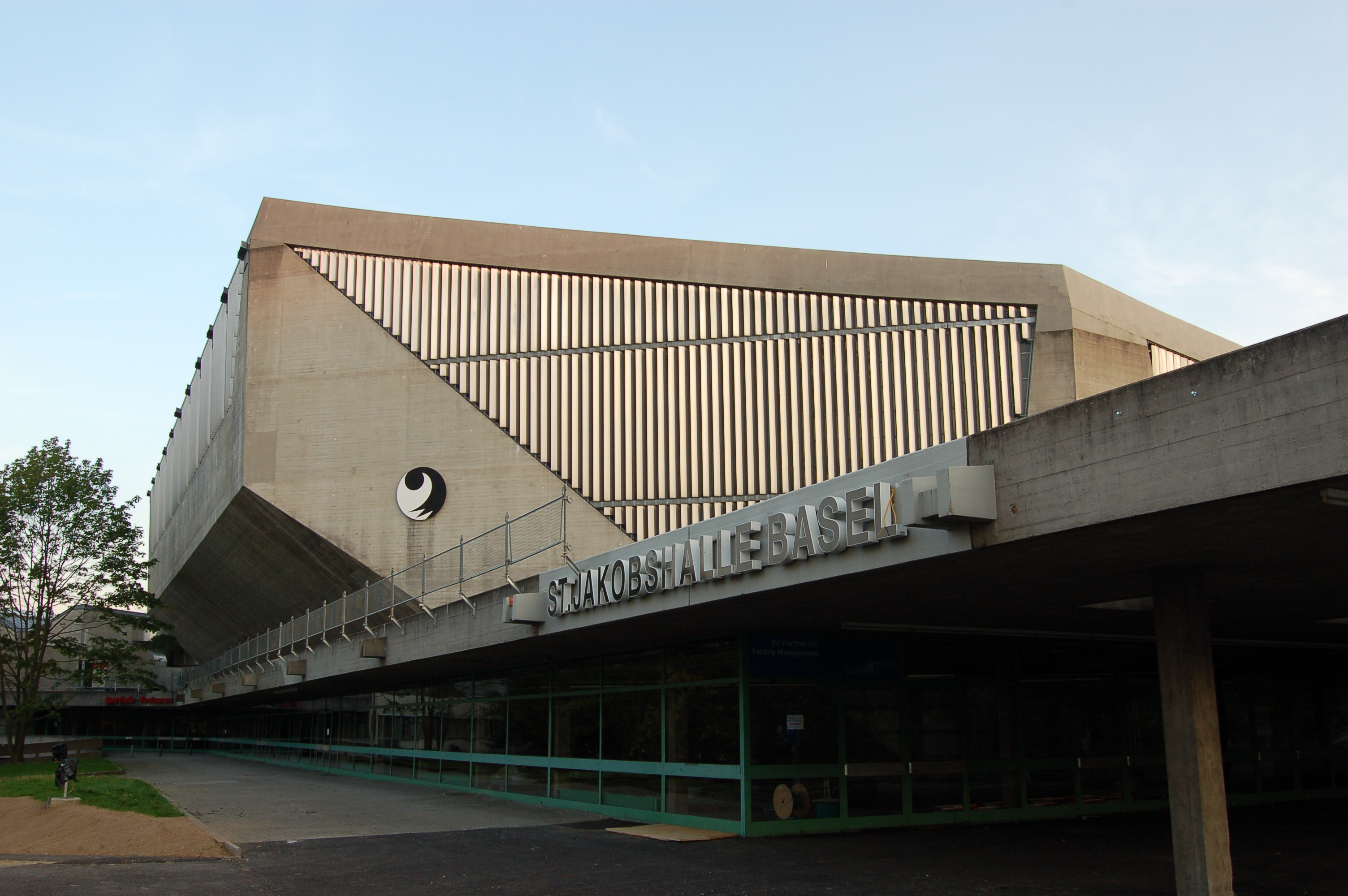
The arena before renovation (2006)

In 1956, the Grand Council of Basel-Stadt submitted a request to the cantonal government for the construction of a multi-purpose hall. After further parliamentary motions, the architect Giovanni Panozzo was commissioned to carry out preliminary planning work in June 1961. On 9 February 1967, the Grand Council approved the project. The necessary credit of 21.57 million Swiss francs was used to secure a referendum. The voters then approved the project in the cantonal referendum on 2 July 1967, with 57.3% in favour.

After the building inspectorate of the canton of Basel-Landschaft granted the building permit on 18 September 1970, preparatory work began on 16 November 1970. The foundation stone was laid on 19 April 1971, by government councilor Max Wullschleger, head of the building department. The St. Jakobshalle was then built under the direction of Panozzo and the civil engineers Albert and Ernst Schmidt. Panozzo received the "Architectural Award for Excellent Buildings of the Canton of Basel-Stadt" in 1980.

The hall complex was put into operation in stages. The first major event held was a concert by Carlos Santana on 8 October 1975. The official opening of the completed complex was on 26 September 1976.

=== Renovation ===
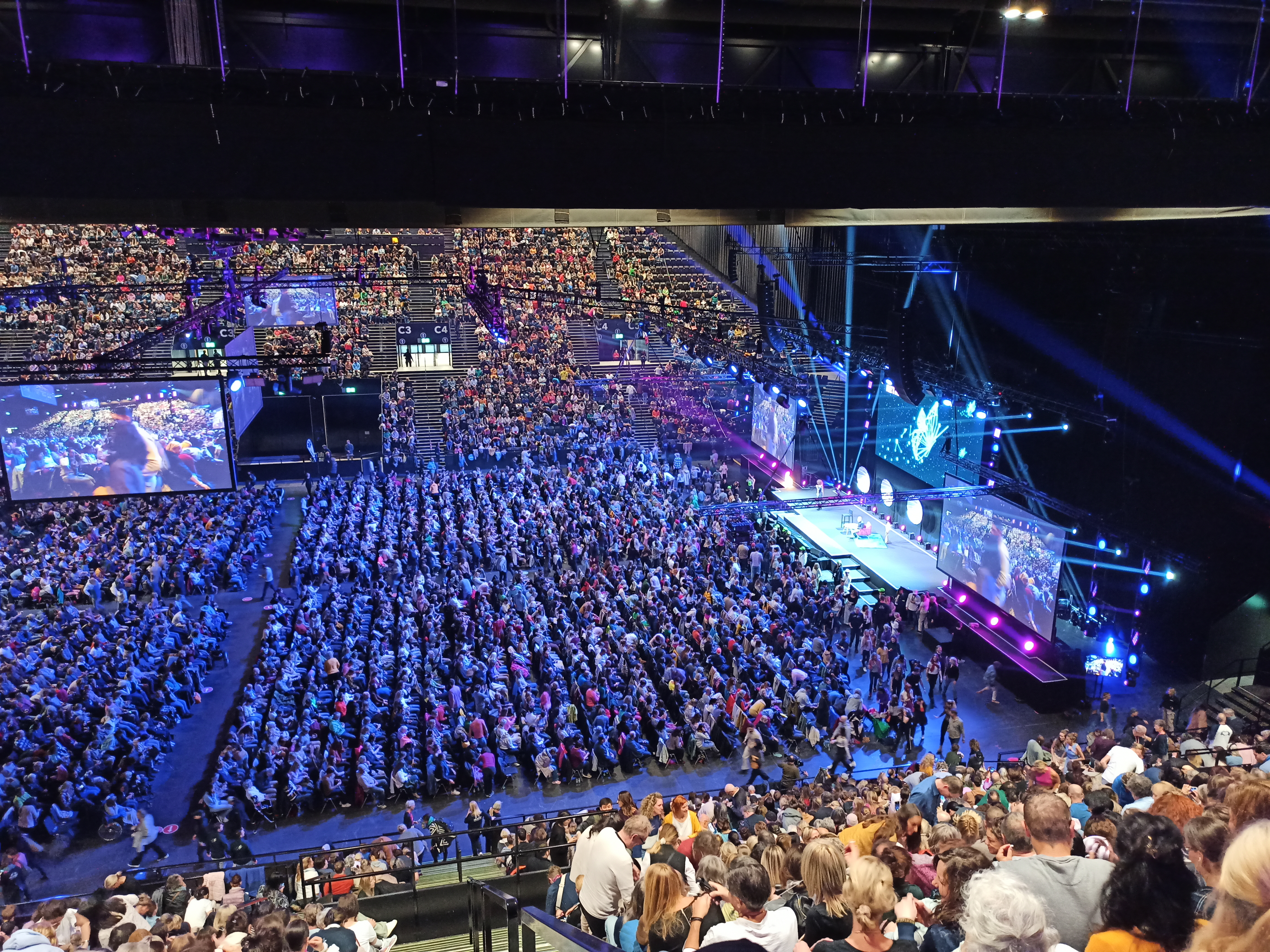
The renovated arena in 2023

In January 2015, the Grand Council of Basel-Stadt approved a loan of CHF 105 million for the renovation and modernisation of the outdated hall, with 89 votes in favor and one abstention. Over three stages, between 2016 and 2018, the venue was comprehensively renovated and its technology upgraded to state-of-the-art but retained its Brutalist appearance. It reopened in October 2018 and now has an increased capacity of 12,400 in the main arena, with improvements in fire protection and escape routes making this possible. The reconstruction project was developed by a consortium of Swiss architectural firms led by Berrel Kräutler Architekten and Degelo Architekten.

The modernization included infrastructure and security improvements, relocation of the main entrance, bringing the building to the same level as the street, extending the roof, increasing the number of spectators, and updating the technical equipment. The complex also houses five smaller halls with variable capacity (from 450 to 2,300), four gymnasiums and a 25-meter swimming pool which can only be used by swimming clubs. The renovated building now has a two-level foyer equipped with glass facade, a business center which has a front window and a spacious balcony with a direct view of the arena, and a VIP area which contains large windows and a private balcony high above the arena. The car park has 1,465 spaces.

The renovation was met with some fierce criticism – and not only because the costs ultimately rose to 141 million Swiss francs. It was argued that architectural and urban planning aspects were given too much attention during the renovation to the detriment of functionality. According to a special report by the audit and finance committee, the current hall does not meet the standards of comparable halls. The committee had published a long list of structural deficiencies regarding the venue in its report, while the Basel cantonal parliament reluctantly approved an additional CHF 7.5 million of funding to remedy the deficiencies.

After the success of the Swiss tennis player and Basel native Roger Federer, the Basel sports director had announced the arena was to be renamed the 'Roger Federer Arena' following the current renovation, but this was later blocked in a local council vote.

== Events ==
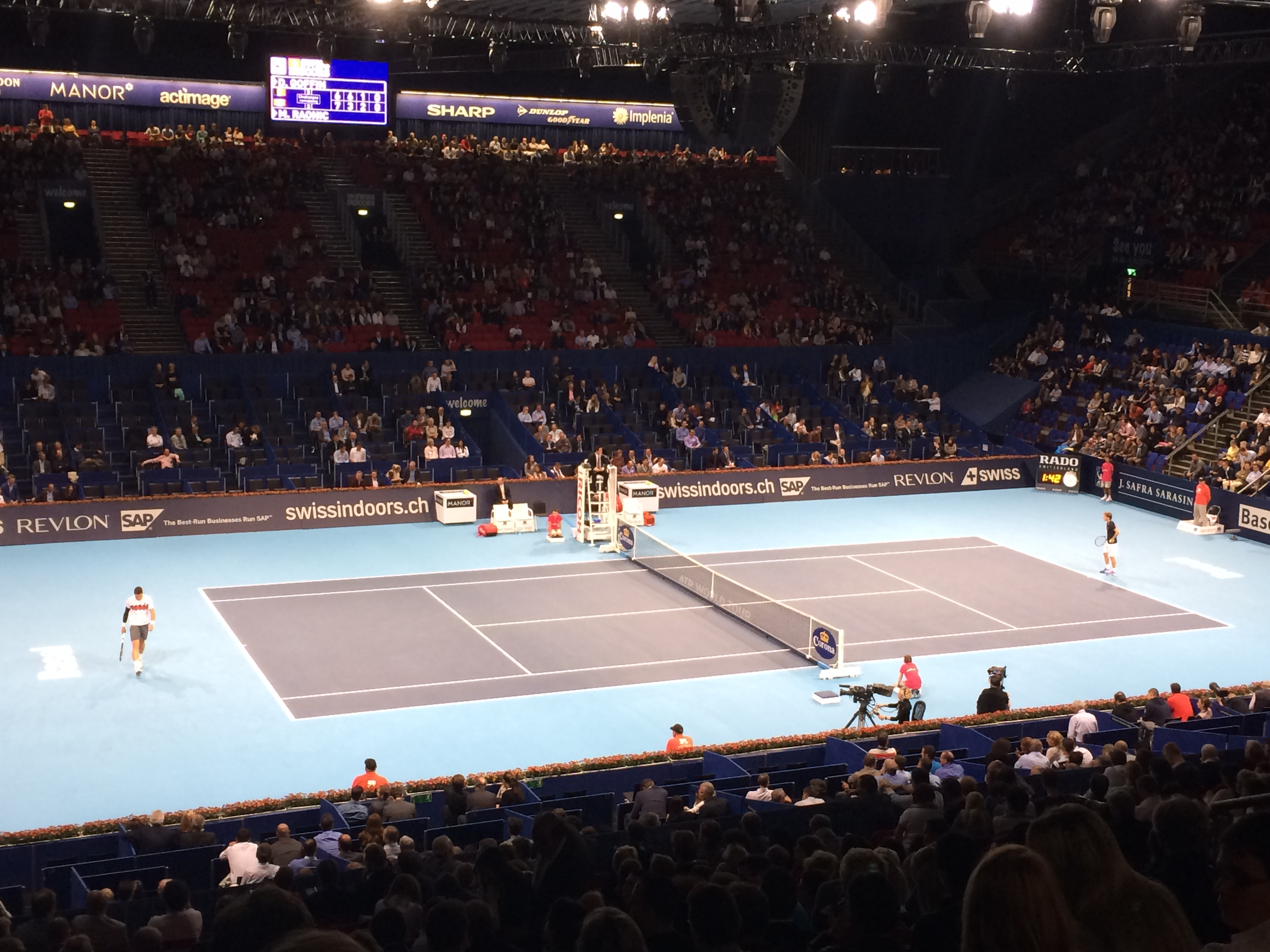
The arena during the 2014 Swiss Indoors

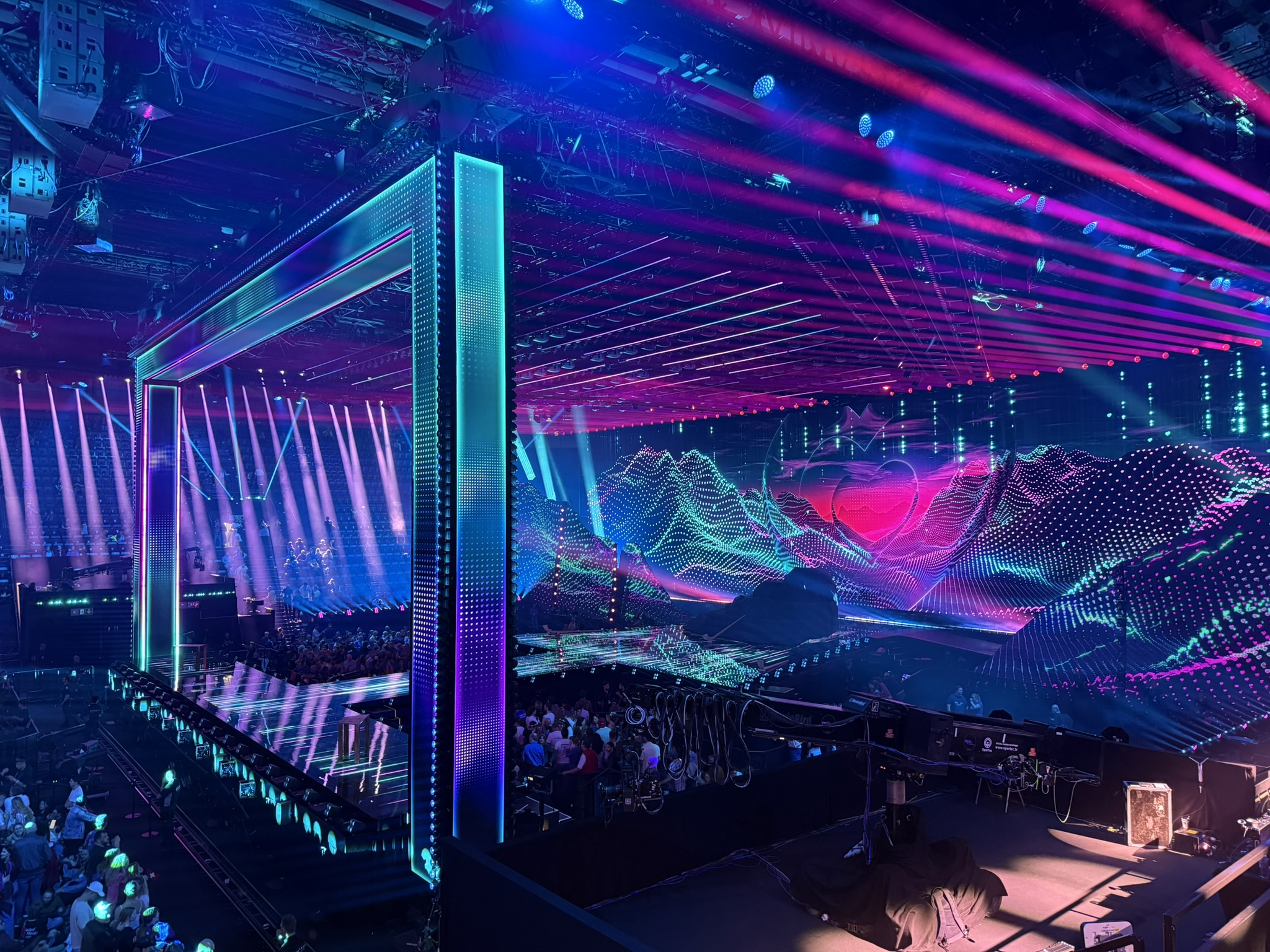
The arena during the Eurovision Song Contest 2025

The venue was primarily designed as a sports hall, which is why it hosts various sports competitions and major championships; but over time, a variety of other uses arose for which it was not originally intended. Tours by internationally renowned musicians and bands regularly pass through the Basel venue. In addition to sporting events and concerts, it also hosts musicals, touring shows, live television broadcasts, festivals, trade fairs and business events. These include twelve editions of the German entertainment television show Wetten, dass..? from 1983 to 2007, a Buddhist ceremony held by the Dalai Lama in February 2015, the Taizé Community's evening prayer during the European Youth Meeting in 2017 and the Eurovision Song Contest 2025.

Each year, the world's elite badminton players gather for their international grand prix tournament and the best European sepak takraw players meet. The Swiss Indoors men's annual tennis tournament is held at the St. Jakobshalle since 1975 and the Women's Top Volley International since 1989. It was the home of EHC Basel ice hockey team from 1976 to 2002 before the team moved to the St. Jakob Arena, which opened in October 2002. International equestrian tournament CHI Classics Basel is held at the venue every year since 2010.

Other sporting events include:

- 1986 World Men's Handball Championship
- 1998 IIHF World Championship
- 2006 European Men's Handball Championship
- 2012 World Men's Curling Championship
- 2016 World Men's Curling Championship.
- 2019 BWF World Championships
- 2024 European Women's Handball Championship
- 2028 European Men's Handball Championship

According to Bob Dylan's biography Chronicles: Volume One, he decided after a concert at St. Jakobshalle to go on the Never Ending Tour.

== See also ==
- List of tennis stadiums by capacity
- List of indoor arenas in Switzerland

== Notes ==
Preceded by Malmö Arena; Malmö	Eurovision Song Contest; Venue; 2025	Succeeded by Wiener Stadthalle; Vienna
