= 2019 BWF Para-Badminton World Championships – Men's singles SL3 =

Men's singles SL3 at the 2019 BWF Para-Badminton World Championships
- Venue: St. Jakobshalle
- Location: Basel, Switzerland
- Dates: 20–25 August

Medalists
gold medal	Pramod Bhagat	India
silver medal	Daniel Bethell	England
bronze medal	Manoj Sarkar	India
bronze medal	Ukun Rukaendi	Indonesia

The men's singles SL3 tournament of the 2019 BWF Para-Badminton World Championships took place from 20 to 25 August.

== Seeds ==
1. (India) Pramod Bhagat (world champion)
2. (England) Daniel Bethell (final)
3. (India) Manoj Sarkar (semi-finals)
4. (Indonesia) Ukun Rukaendi (semi-finals)
5. (Germany) Pascal Wolter (group stage)
6. (Japan) Daisuke Fujihara (quarter-finals)
7. (France) Mathieu Thomas (first round)
8. (India) Umesh Vikram Kumar (quarter-finals)

== Group stage ==
All times are local (UTC+2).

=== Group A ===
Pos	Team	Pld	W	L	GF	GA	GD	PF	PA	PD	Pts	Qualification
1	(India) Pramod Bhagat [1]	1	1	0	2	0	+2	47	41	+6	1	Advance to Knock-out stage
2	(Thailand) Mongkhon Bunsun	1	0	1	0	2	−2	41	47	−6	0	Advance to Knock-out stage
3	(Kenya) Edwin Muruah Mwangi (N)	0	0	0	0	0	0	0	0	0	0	

Source: TS
(N) Did not start

Date		Score		Set 1	Set 2	Set 3
22 Aug; 17:00	Pramod Bhagat (India)	2–0	(Thailand) Mongkhon Bunsun	26–24	21–17	

=== Group B ===
Pos	Team	Pld	W	L	GF	GA	GD	PF	PA	PD	Pts	Qualification
1	(England) Daniel Bethell [2]	2	2	0	4	0	+4	84	18	+66	2	Advance to Knock-out stage
2	(Turkey) Mustafa Tuğra Nur	2	1	1	2	2	0	50	54	−4	1	Advance to Knock-out stage
3	(Uganda) Paddy Kizza Kasirye	2	0	2	0	4	−4	22	84	−62	0	

Source: TS

Date		Score		Set 1	Set 2	Set 3
20 Aug; 11:00	Daniel Bethell (England)	2–0	(Uganda) Paddy Kizza Kasirye	21–5	21–5	
21 Aug; 13:30	Mustafa Tuğra Nur (Turkey)	2–0	(Uganda) Paddy Kizza Kasirye	21–6	21–6	
22 Aug; 17:00	Daniel Bethell (England)	2–0	(Turkey) Mustafa Tuğra Nur	21–4	21–4	

=== Group C ===
Pos	Team	Pld	W	L	GF	GA	GD	PF	PA	PD	Pts	Qualification
1	(India) Manoj Sarkar [3/4]	1	1	0	2	1	+1	55	35	+20	1	Advance to Knock-out stage
2	(Spain) Simon Cruz Mondejar	0	0	0	1	2	−1	35	55	−20	0	Advance to Knock-out stage
3	(Nigeria) Chukwuebuka Sunday Eze (N)	1	0	1	0	0	0	0	0	0	0	

Source: TS
(N) Did not start

Date		Score		Set 1	Set 2	Set 3
20 Aug; 10:30	Manoj Sarkar (India)	2–1	(Spain) Simon Cruz Mondejar	13–21	21–6	21–8

=== Group D ===
Pos	Team	Pld	W	L	GF	GA	GD	PF	PA	PD	Pts	Qualification
1	(Indonesia) Ukun Rukaendi [3/4]	3	3	0	6	1	+5	142	102	+40	3	Advance to Knock-out stage
2	(Malaysia) Muhammad Huzairi Abdul Malek	3	2	1	5	3	+2	153	125	+28	2	Advance to Knock-out stage
3	(China) Wu Faxin	3	1	2	3	4	−1	117	128	−11	1	
4	(Scotland) Colin Leslie	3	0	3	0	6	−6	70	127	−57	0	

Source: TS

Date		Score		Set 1	Set 2	Set 3
20 Aug; 10:30	Wu Faxin (China)	2–0	(Scotland) Colin Leslie	21–9	22–20	
20 Aug; 10:30	Ukun Rukaendi (Indonesia)	2–1	(Malaysia) Muhammad Huzairi Abdul Malek	16–21	21–14	21–19
21 Aug; 13:00	Ukun Rukaendi (Indonesia)	2–0	(Scotland) Colin Leslie	21–8	21–11	
21 Aug; 13:00	Wu Faxin (China)	1–2	(Malaysia) Muhammad Huzairi Abdul Malek	11–21	21–15	13–21
22 Aug; 17:00	Ukun Rukaendi (Indonesia)	2–0	(China) Wu Faxin	21–13	21–16	
22 Aug; 17:30	Colin Leslie (Scotland)	0–2	(Malaysia) Muhammad Huzairi Abdul Malek	11–21	11–21	

=== Group E ===
Pos	Team	Pld	W	L	GF	GA	GD	PF	PA	PD	Pts	Qualification
1	(Vietnam) Trịnh Anh Tuấn	3	3	0	6	0	+6	126	62	+64	3	Advance to Knock-out stage
2	(Ukraine) Oleksandr Chyrkov	3	2	1	4	2	+2	106	91	+15	2	Advance to Knock-out stage
3	(Germany) Pascal Wolter [5/8]	3	1	2	2	4	−2	95	98	−3	1	
4	(Finland) Antti Kärki	3	0	3	0	6	−6	50	126	−76	0	

Source: TS

Date		Score		Set 1	Set 2	Set 3
20 Aug; 10:30	Trịnh Anh Tuấn (Vietnam)	2–0	(Finland) Antti Kärki	21–6	21–9	
20 Aug; 11:00	Pascal Wolter (Germany)	0–2	(Ukraine) Oleksandr Chyrkov	10–21	18–21	
21 Aug; 13:30	Pascal Wolter (Germany)	'2–0	(Finland) Antti Kärki	21–6	21–8	
21 Aug; 13:30	Trịnh Anh Tuấn (Vietnam)	2–0	(Ukraine) Oleksandr Chyrkov	21–9	21–13	
22 Aug; 17:30	Pascal Wolter (Germany)	0–2	(Vietnam) Trịnh Anh Tuấn	16–21	9–21	
22 Aug; 17:30	Antti Kärki (Finland)	0–2	(Ukraine) Oleksandr Chyrkov	12–21	9–21	

=== Group F ===
Pos	Team	Pld	W	L	GF	GA	GD	PF	PA	PD	Pts	Qualification
1	(Japan) Daisuke Fujihara [5/8]	3	3	0	6	0	+6	127	68	+59	3	Advance to Knock-out stage
2	(Scotland) Alan Oliver	3	2	1	4	4	0	141	148	−7	2	Advance to Knock-out stage
3	(France) Geoffrey Byzery	3	1	2	3	5	−2	144	164	−20	1	
4	(Brazil) Leonardo Zuffo	3	0	3	2	6	−4	123	155	−32	0	

Source: TS

Date		Score		Set 1	Set 2	Set 3
20 Aug; 11:00	Alan Oliver (Scotland)	2–1	(Brazil) Leonardo Zuffo	11–21	21–13	21–16
20 Aug; 11:00	Daisuke Fujihara (Japan)	2–0	(France) Geoffrey Byzery	21–8	22–20	
21 Aug; 14:00	Daisuke Fujihara (Japan)	2–0	(Brazil) Leonardo Zuffo	21–9	21–11	
21 Aug; 14:00	Alan Oliver (Scotland)	2–1	(France) Geoffrey Byzery	21–9	20–22	27–25
22 Aug; 17:30	Leonardo Zuffo (Brazil)	1–2	(France) Geoffrey Byzery	21–18	17–21	15–21
22 Aug; 18:00	Daisuke Fujihara (Japan)	2–0	(Scotland) Alan Oliver	21–7	21–13	

=== Group G ===
Pos	Team	Pld	W	L	GF	GA	GD	PF	PA	PD	Pts	Qualification
1	(France) Mathieu Thomas [5/8]	3	3	0	6	2	+4	161	124	+37	3	Advance to Knock-out stage
2	(South Korea) Joo Dong-jae	3	2	1	5	3	+2	156	127	+29	2	Advance to Knock-out stage
3	(Japan) Taku Hiroi	3	1	2	2	4	−2	93	114	−21	1	
4	(England) William Smith	3	0	3	2	6	−4	119	164	−45	0	

Source: TS

Date		Score		Set 1	Set 2	Set 3
20 Aug; 11:30	William Smith (England)	1–2	(South Korea) Joo Dong-jae	19–21	21–18	6–21
20 Aug; 11:30	Mathieu Thomas (France)	2–0	(Japan) Taku Hiroi	21–13	21–14	
21 Aug; 14:00	Mathieu Thomas (France)	2–1	(South Korea) Joo Dong-jae	21–19	15–21	21–14
21 Aug; 14:30	William Smith (England)	0–2	(Japan) Taku Hiroi	16–21	14–21	
22 Aug; 18:00	Mathieu Thomas (France)	2–1	(England) William Smith	21–6	20–22	21–15
22 Aug; 18:00	Joo Dong-jae (South Korea)	2–0	(Japan) Taku Hiroi	21–8	21–16	

=== Group H ===
Pos	Team	Pld	W	L	GF	GA	GD	PF	PA	PD	Pts	Qualification
1	(India) Umesh Vikram Kumar [5/8]	3	3	0	6	1	+5	144	103	+41	3	Advance to Knock-out stage
2	(China) Chen Xiaoyu	3	2	1	5	2	+3	141	95	+46	2	Advance to Knock-out stage
3	(Vietnam) Phạm Đức Trung	3	1	2	2	4	−2	83	99	−16	1	
4	(Canada) William Roussy	3	0	3	0	6	−6	55	126	−71	0	

Source: TS

Date		Score		Set 1	Set 2	Set 3
20 Aug; 11:30	Phạm Đức Trung (Vietnam)	0–2	(China) Chen Xiaoyu	10–21	5–21	
20 Aug; 11:30	Umesh Vikram Kumar (India)	2–0	(Canada) William Roussy	21–9	21–11	
21 Aug; 14:30	Umesh Vikram Kumar (India)	2–1	(China) Chen Xiaoyu	18–21	21–18	21–18
21 Aug; 14:30	Phạm Đức Trung (Vietnam)	2–0	(Canada) William Roussy	21–6	21–9	
22 Aug; 18:30	Umesh Vikram Kumar (India)	2–0	(Vietnam) Phạm Đức Trung	21–16	21–10	
22 Aug; 18:30	Chen Xiaoyu (China)	2–0	(Canada) William Roussy	21–7	21–13	

== Knock-out stage ==
First Round
1	(India) Pramod Bhagat	21	21
(China) Chen Xiaoyu	15	12
5/8	(India) Umesh Vikram Kumar	21	21
(Scotland) Alan Oliver	7	14
3/4	(India) Manoj Sarkar	21	21
(Malaysia) Muhammad Huzairi Abdul Malek	16	15
(Vietnam) Trịnh Anh Tuấn	14	21	21
(South Korea) Joo Dong-jae	21	17	16
(Thailand) Mongkhon Bunsun	19	21	21
5/8	(France) Mathieu Thomas	21	19	14
(Ukraine) Oleksandr Chyrkov	16	16
3/4	(Indonesia) Ukun Rukaendi	21	21
(Turkey) Mustafa Tuğra Nur	19	8
5/8	(Japan) Daisuke Fujihara	21	21
(Spain) Simon Cruz Mondejar	4	3
2	(England) Daniel Bethell	21	21

Quarter-finals
1	(India) Pramod Bhagat	21	21
5/8	(India) Umesh Vikram Kumar	16	12
3/4	(India) Manoj Sarkar	21	19	21
(Vietnam) Trịnh Anh Tuấn	10	21	15
(Thailand) Mongkhon Bunsun	17	10
3/4	(Indonesia) Ukun Rukaendi	21	21
5/8	(Japan) Daisuke Fujihara	14	15
2	(England) Daniel Bethell	21	21

Semi-finals
1	(India) Pramod Bhagat	21	21
3/4	(India) Manoj Sarkar	18	16
3/4	(Indonesia) Ukun Rukaendi	5	8
2	(England) Daniel Bethell	21	21

Final
1	(India) Pramod Bhagat	6	21	21
2	(England) Daniel Bethell	21	14	5
