= 2026 BWF Para-Badminton World Championships – Men's Singles SL3 =

Men's Singles SL3 at 2026 BWF Para-Badminton World Championships
Tournament details
- Dates: 8–13 February 2026
- Competitors: 29
- Venue: Isa Sports City, Manama

The men's singles SL3 tournament at the 2026 BWF Para-Badminton World Championships took place from 8 to 13 February 2026 at Isa Sports City in Manama. A total of 29 players competed at the tournament.

== Classification ==
- SL3
  Players have impairment in one or both lower limbs and poor walking/running balance

== Format ==
The 29 players were split into 8 groups of three to four players. They played a round-robin tournament with the top 2 players advancing to the knockout stage. Each match was played in a best-of-3.

== Seeds ==
These were the seeds for this event:

1. (India) Kumar Nitesh (semi-finals)
2. (India) Pramod Bhagat (champion)

== Group stage ==
All times are local (UTC+3).

=== Group A ===
Pos	Team	Pld	W	L	GF	GA	GD	PF	PA	PD	Pts	Qualification
1	Kumar Nitesh (IND)	2	2	0	4	0	+4	84	26	+58	2	Knockout stage
2	Simon Cruz (ESP)	2	1	1	2	2	0	56	50	+6	1	Knockout stage
3	Majed Al-Sahafi (KSA)	2	0	2	0	4	−4	20	84	−64	0	

Source: BWFBadminton.com

Date	Time	Player 1	Score	Player 2	Set 1	Set 2	Set 3
8 February	12:00	Majed Al-Sahafi (Saudi Arabia)	0–2	(Spain) Simon Cruz	3–21	5–21	
9 February	09:00	Kumar Nitesh (India)	2–0	(Saudi Arabia) Majed Al-Sahafi	21–5	21–7	
10 February	11:00	Kumar Nitesh (India)	2–0	(Spain) Simon Cruz	21–7	21–7	

=== Group B ===
Pos	Team	Pld	W	L	GF	GA	GD	PF	PA	PD	Pts	Qualification
1	Pramod Bhagat (IND)	2	2	0	4	0	+4	84	32	+52	2	Knockout stage
2	Rishikesh Venu (NZL)	2	1	1	2	2	0	62	74	−12	1	Knockout stage
3	Dimitar Pavlov (BUL)	2	0	2	0	4	−4	45	85	−40	0	

Source: BWFBadminton.com

Date	Time	Player 1	Score	Player 2	Set 1	Set 2	Set 3
8 February	09:00	Rishikesh Venu (New Zealand)	2–0	(Bulgaria) Dimitar Pavlov	22–20	21–12	
9 February	09:00	Pramod Bhagat (India)	2–0	(New Zealand) Rishikesh Venu	21–7	21–12	
10 February	09:00	Pramod Bhagat (India)	2–0	(Bulgaria) Dimitar Pavlov	21–6	21–7	

=== Group C ===
Pos	Team	Pld	W	L	GF	GA	GD	PF	PA	PD	Pts	Qualification
1	Xiong Lichuan (CHN)	2	2	0	4	1	+3	106	69	+37	2	Knockout stage
2	Oleksandr Chyrkov (UKR)	2	1	1	3	2	+1	100	70	+30	1	Knockout stage
3	Rudolf Klein (SVK)	2	0	2	0	4	−4	17	84	−67	0	

Source: BWFBadminton.com

Date	Time	Player 1	Score	Player 2	Set 1	Set 2	Set 3
8 February	09:00	Xiong Lichuan (China)	2–0	(Slovakia) Rudolf Klein	21–6	21–5	
9 February	09:30	Oleksandr Chyrkov (Ukraine)	1–2	(China) Xiong Lichuan	22–20	15–21	21–23
10 February	11:30	Oleksandr Chyrkov (Ukraine)	2–0	(Slovakia) Rudolf Klein	21–3	21–3	

=== Group D ===
Pos	Team	Pld	W	L	GF	GA	GD	PF	PA	PD	Pts	Qualification
1	Mongkhon Bunsun (THA)	3	3	0	6	1	+5	148	96	+52	3	Knockout stage
2	Manoj Sarkar (IND)	3	2	1	4	2	+2	104	102	+2	2	Knockout stage
3	Curnow Pirbhai-Clarke (ENG)	3	1	2	3	4	−1	121	139	−18	1	
4	Joo Dong-jae (KOR)	3	0	3	0	6	−6	94	130	−36	0	

Source: BWFBadminton.com

Date	Time	Player 1	Score	Player 2	Set 1	Set 2	Set 3
8 February	12:00	Mongkhon Bunsun (Thailand)	2–0	(South Korea) Joo Dong-jae	23–21	21–10	
8 February	12:30	Manoj Sarkar (India)	2–0	(England) Curnow Pirbhai-Clarke	21–17	21–15	
9 February	11:00	Manoj Sarkar (India)	0–2	(Thailand) Mongkhon Bunsun	7–21	13–21	
9 February	11:30	Joo Dong-jae (South Korea)	0–2	(England) Curnow Pirbhai-Clarke	21–23	14–21	
10 February	11:30	Mongkhon Bunsun (Thailand)	2–1	(England) Curnow Pirbhai-Clarke	20–22	21–7	21–16
10 February	12:00	Manoj Sarkar (India)	2–0	(South Korea) Joo Dong-jae	21–17	21–11	

=== Group E ===
Pos	Team	Pld	W	L	GF	GA	GD	PF	PA	PD	Pts	Qualification
1	Umesh Vikram Kumar (IND)	3	3	0	6	0	+6	126	86	+40	3	Knockout stage
2	Lee Seung-hu (KOR)	3	2	1	4	2	+2	114	70	+44	2	Knockout stage
3	Mustafa Tuğra Nur (TUR)	3	1	2	2	4	−2	91	91	0	1	
4	Radek Dutý (CZE)	3	0	3	0	6	−6	42	126	−84	0	

Source: BWFBadminton.com

Date	Time	Player 1	Score	Player 2	Set 1	Set 2	Set 3
8 February	12:30	Mustafa Tuğra Nur (Turkey)	2–0	(Czech Republic) Radek Dutý	21–3	21–4	
8 February	13:00	Umesh Vikram Kumar (India)	2–0	(South Korea) Lee Seung-hu	21–11	21–19	
9 February	11:30	Umesh Vikram Kumar (India)	2–0	(Turkey) Mustafa Tuğra Nur	21–18	21–16	
9 February	12:00	Radek Dutý (South Korea)	0–2	(South Korea) Lee Seung-hu	6–21	7–21	
10 February	12:00	Umesh Vikram Kumar (India)	2–0	(Czech Republic) Radek Dutý	21–7	21–15	
10 February	12:30	Mustafa Tuğra Nur (Turkey)	0–2	(South Korea) Lee Seung-hu	7–21	8–21	

=== Group F ===
Pos	Team	Pld	W	L	GF	GA	GD	PF	PA	PD	Pts	Qualification
1	Daisuke Fujihara (JPN)	3	3	0	6	0	+6	126	31	+95	3	Knockout stage
2	Thomas Numitor (FRA)	3	2	1	4	3	+1	110	119	−9	2	Knockout stage
3	Alex Santamaria (ESP)	3	1	2	2	4	−2	89	124	−35	1	
4	Su Yu-an (TPE)	3	0	3	1	6	−5	95	146	−51	0	

Source: BWFBadminton.com

Date	Time	Player 1	Score	Player 2	Set 1	Set 2	Set 3
8 February	13:00	Thomas Numitor (France)	2–0	(Spain) Alex Santamaria	21–15	21–16	
8 February	13:30	Daisuke Fujihara (Japan)	2–0	(Chinese Taipei) Su Yu-an	21–5	21–4	
9 February	12:00	Daisuke Fujihara (Japan)	2–0	(France) Thomas Numitor	21–5	21–4	
9 February	12:30	Alex Santamaria (Spain)	2–0	(Chinese Taipei) Su Yu-an	24–22	21–18	
10 February	12:30	Daisuke Fujihara (Japan)	2–0	(Spain) Alex Santamaria	21–9	21–4	
10 February	13:00	Thomas Numitor (France)	2–1	(Chinese Taipei) Su Yu-an	21–10	17–21	21–15

=== Group G ===
Pos	Team	Pld	W	L	GF	GA	GD	PF	PA	PD	Pts	Qualification
1	Muhammad Al Imran (INA)	3	3	0	6	0	+6	126	69	+57	3	Knockout stage
2	Yi Yuzhe (CHN)	3	2	1	4	2	+2	116	74	+42	2	Knockout stage
3	Gerson Jair Vargas Lostaunaul (PER)	3	1	2	2	4	−2	90	93	−3	1	
4	Margus Hoop (EST)	3	0	3	0	6	−6	30	126	−96	0	

Source: BWFBadminton.com

Date	Time	Player 1	Score	Player 2	Set 1	Set 2	Set 3
8 February	09:30	Gerson Jair Vargas Lostaunaul (Peru)	2–0	(Estonia) Margus Hoop	21–5	21–4	
8 February	13:30	Muhammad Al Imran (Indonesia)	2–0	(China) Yi Yuzhe	21–19	21–13	
9 February	09:30	Muhammad Al Imran (Indonesia)	2–0	(Peru) Gerson Jair Vargas Lostaunaul	21–13	21–8	
9 February	12:30	Margus Hoop (Estonia)	0–2	(China) Yi Yuzhe	2–21	3–21	
10 February	09:00	Gerson Jair Vargas Lostaunaul (Peru)	0–2	(China) Yi Yuzhe	11–21	16–21	
10 February	13:00	Muhammad Al Imran (Indonesia)	2–0	(Estonia) Margus Hoop	21–8	21–8	

=== Group H ===
Pos	Team	Pld	W	L	GF	GA	GD	PF	PA	PD	Pts	Qualification
1	Mathieu Thomas (FRA)	3	3	0	6	1	+5	143	97	+46	3	Knockout stage
2	Chen Xiaoyu (CHN)	3	2	1	4	3	+1	127	116	+11	2	Knockout stage
3	William Roussy (CAN)	3	1	2	4	4	0	142	138	+4	1	
4	Albert Manuel Puente Perez (PER)	3	0	3	0	6	−6	65	126	−61	0	

Source: BWFBadminton.com

Date	Time	Player 1	Score	Player 2	Set 1	Set 2	Set 3
8 February	12:30	William Roussy (Canada)	1–2	(China) Chen Xiaoyu	21–13	13–21	21–23
8 February	14:00	Mathieu Thomas (France)	2–0	(Peru) Albert Manuel Puente Perez	21–12	21–12	
9 February	13:00	Mathieu Thomas (France)	2–1	(Canada) William Roussy	17–21	21–11	21–13
9 February	13:00	Chen Xiaoyu (China)	2–0	(Peru) Albert Manuel Puente Perez	21–7	21–12	
10 February	13:30	William Roussy (Canada)	2–0	(Peru) Albert Manuel Puente Perez	21–12	21–10	
10 February	14:00	Mathieu Thomas (France)	2–0	(China) Chen Xiaoyu	21–18	21–10	

== Knockout stage ==
Round of 16
A1	(India) Kumar Nitesh	20	21	21
C2	(Ukraine) Oleksandr Chyrkov	22	15	9
H1	(France) Mathieu Thomas	21	24	21
D2	(India) Manoj Sarkar	18	26	17
C1	(China) Xiong Lichuan	21	21
B2	(New Zealand) Rishikesh Venu	8	12
G1	(Indonesia) Muhammad Al Imran	21	21
H2	(China) Chen Xiaoyu	14	13
G2	(China) Yi Yuzhe	15	23	21
F1	(Japan) Daisuke Fujihara	21	21	12
E2	(South Korea) Lee Seung-hu	21	4	13
D1	(Thailand) Mongkhon Bunsun	19	21	21
A2	(Spain) Simon Cruz	9	14
E1	(India) Umesh Vikram Kumar	21	21
F2	(France) Thomas Numitor	8	6
B1	(India) Pramod Bhagat	21	21

Quarter-finals
A1	(India) Kumar Nitesh	21	21
H1	(France) Mathieu Thomas	10	11
C1	(China) Xiong Lichuan	18	11
G1	(Indonesia) Muhammad Al Imran	21	21
G2	(China) Yi Yuzhe	11	19
D1	(Thailand) Mongkhon Bunsun	21	21
E1	(India) Umesh Vikram Kumar	17	13
B1	(India) Pramod Bhagat	21	21

Semi-finals
A1	(India) Kumar Nitesh	21	17	11
G1	(Indonesia) Muhammad Al Imran	12	21	21
D1	(Thailand) Mongkhon Bunsun	19	17
B1	(India) Pramod Bhagat	21	21

Final
G1	(Indonesia) Muhammad Al Imran	12	18
B1	(India) Pramod Bhagat	21	21
