= Badminton at the 2024 Summer Paralympics – Men's singles SL3 =

Badminton competition

Men's singles SL3 at the XVII Paralympic Games
- Venue: Arena Porte de La Chapelle, Paris
- Dates: 29 August 2024 – 2 September 2024
- Competitors: 8 from 7 nations

Medalists
1st place, gold medalist(s)		Kumar Nitesh	India
2nd place, silver medalist(s)		Daniel Bethell	Great Britain
3rd place, bronze medalist(s)		Mongkhon Bunsun	Thailand

The men's singles SL3 tournament at the 2024 Summer Paralympics in France took place between 29 August and 2 September 2024 at Arena Porte de La Chapelle.

== Classification ==
- SL3
  Players have impairment in one or both lower limbs and poor walking/running balance

== Seeds ==
These were the seeds for this event:

1. Kumar Nitesh (IND) (champion, gold medalist)
2. Daniel Bethell (GBR) (final, silver medalist)

== Group stage ==
The draw of the group stage revealed on 24 August 2024. The group stage will be played from 29 to 31 August. The top two winners of each group advanced to the knockout rounds.

=== Group A ===
Pos	Team	Pld	W	L	GF	GA	GD	PF	PA	PD	Pts	Qualification
1	Kumar Nitesh (IND)	3	3	0	6	1	+5	144	95	+49	3	Semi-finals
2	Mongkhon Bunsun (THA)	3	2	1	4	2	+2	111	92	+19	2	Semi-finals
3	Manoj Sarkar (IND)	3	1	2	3	4	−1	121	128	−7	1	
4	Yang Jianyuan (CHN)	3	0	3	0	6	−6	65	126	−61	0	

Source: COJOP2024

Date	Time	Player 1	Score	Player 2	Set 1	Set 2	Set 3	Report
Aug 29	13:20	Kumar Nitesh (India)	2–1	(India) Manoj Sarkar	21–13	18–21	21–18	Report
Aug 29	14:21	Mongkhon Bunsun (Thailand)	2–0	(China) Yang Jianyuan	21–14	21–9		Report
Aug 30	9:42	Mongkhon Bunsun (Thailand)	2–0	(India) Manoj Sarkar	21–19	21–8		Report
Aug 30	10:27	Kumar Nitesh (India)	2–0	(China) Yang Jianyuan	21–5	21–11		Report
Aug 31	10:13	Kumar Nitesh (India)	2–0	(Thailand) Mongkhon Bunsun	21–13	21–14		Report
Aug 31	10:51	Manoj Sarkar (India)	2–0	(China) Yang Jianyuan	21–15	21–11		Report

=== Group B ===
Pos	Team	Pld	W	L	GF	GA	GD	PF	PA	PD	Pts	Qualification
1	Daniel Bethell (GBR)	3	3	0	6	0	+6	126	30	+96	3	Semi-finals
2	Daisuke Fujihara (JPN)	3	2	1	4	3	+1	116	116	0	2	Semi-finals
3	Oleksandr Chyrkov (UKR)	3	1	2	3	4	−1	106	129	−23	1	
4	Wojtek Czyz (NZL)	3	0	3	0	6	−6	53	126	−73	0	

First match(es) will be played: 31 August 2024. Source: COJOP2024

Date	Time	Player 1	Score	Player 2	Set 1	Set 2	Set 3	Report
Aug 29	12:31	Oleksandr Chyrkov (Ukraine)	1–2	(Japan) Daisuke Fujihara	21–19	16–21	17–21	Report
Aug 29	12:57	Daniel Bethell (United Kingdom)	2–0	(New Zealand) Wojtek Czyz	21–5	21–2		Report
Aug 30	9:52	Daniel Bethell (United Kingdom)	2–0	(Japan) Daisuke Fujihara	21–9	21–4		Report
Aug 30	10:46	Wojtek Czyz (New Zealand)	0–2	(Ukraine) Oleksandr Chyrkov	16–21	10–21		Report
Aug 31	9:39	Daniel Bethell (United Kingdom)	2–0	(Ukraine) Oleksandr Chyrkov	21–5	21–5		Report
Aug 31	10:23	Wojtek Czyz (New Zealand)	0–2	(Japan) Daisuke Fujihara	8–21	12–21		Report

== Finals ==
The knockout stage will be played from 1 to 2 September.

Semi-finals
A1	Kumar Nitesh (IND)	21	21
B2	Daisuke Fujihara (JPN)	16	12
A2	Mongkhon Bunsun (THA)	7	9
B1	Daniel Bethell (GBR)	21	21

Gold medal match
A1	Kumar Nitesh (IND)	21	18	23
B1	Daniel Bethell (GBR)	14	21	21
Bronze medal match
B2	Daisuke Fujihara (JPN)	15	15
A2	Mongkhon Bunsun (THA)	21	21
