= Badminton at the 2022 Asian Para Games – Men's singles SL3 =

Badminton's men's singles SL3 at the 2022 Asian Para Games
- Venue: Binjiang Gymnasium, Hangzhou
- Dates: 20 – 27 August 2023
- Competitors: 20 from 14 nations

Medalists
gold medal	Pramod Bhagat	India
silver medal	Kumar Nitesh	India
bronze medal	Mongkhon Bunsun	Thailand
bronze medal	Daisuke Fujihara	Japan

The men's singles SL3 badminton tournament at the 2022 Asian Para Games are playing from 20 to 27 October 2023 in Binjiang Gymnasium, Hangzhou. A total of 20 players competed at the tournament, six of whom were seeded.

== Competition schedule ==
Plays are taking place between 20 and 27 October 2023.

GS	Group stage	R16	Round of 16	¼	Quarterfinals	½	Semifinals	F	Final

Events	Fri 20	Sat 21	Sun 22	Mon 23	Tue 24	Wed 25	Thu 26	Fri 27
Men's singles SL3	GS	GS		GS	R16	¼	½	F

== Seeds ==
The following players were seeded:

1. Pramod Bhagat (IND) (champion; gold medalist)
2. Kumar Nitesh (IND) (final; silver medalist)
3. Daisuke Fujihara (JPN) (semi-finals; bronze medalist)
4. Manoj Sarkar (IND) (quarter-finals)
5. Mongkhon Bunsun (THA) (semi-finals; bronze medalist)
6. Joo Dong-jae (KOR) (round of 16)

== Group stage ==
=== Group A ===
Pos	Team	Pld	W	L	GF	GA	GD	PF	PA	PD	Qualification
1	Pramod Bhagat (IND) [1]	2	2	0	4	0	+4	84	43	+41	Qualification to elimination stage
2	Huang Hsing-chih (TPE)	2	1	1	2	2	0	55	84	−29	Qualification to elimination stage
3	Mohamed Abdul Latheef (MDV)	2	0	2	0	4	−4	58	70	−12	

Source: Group A – standings

Date		Score		Game 1	Game 2	Game 3
20 Oct	Huang Hsing-chih (Chinese Taipei)	2–0	(Maldives) Mohamed Abdul Latheef	21–19	21–9	
21 Oct	Pramod Bhagat (India)	2–0	(Chinese Taipei) Huang Hsing-chih	21–9	21–18	
23 Oct	Pramod Bhagat (India)	2–0	(Maldives) Mohamed Abdul Latheef	21–10	21–6	

=== Group B ===
Pos	Team	Pld	W	L	GF	GA	GD	PF	PA	PD	Qualification
1	Kumar Nitesh (IND) [2]	2	2	0	4	0	+4	85	52	+33	Qualification to elimination stage
2	Chen Xiaoyu (CHN) (H)	2	1	1	2	3	−1	94	94	0	Qualification to elimination stage
3	Dwiyoko (INA)	2	0	2	1	4	−3	69	102	−33	

Source: Group B – standings
(H) Host

Date		Score		Game 1	Game 2	Game 3
20 Oct	Dwiyoko (Indonesia)	1–2	(China) Chen Xiaoyu	21–18	16–21	14–21
21 Oct	Kumar Nitesh (India)	2–0	(Indonesia) Dwiyoko	21–5	21–13	
23 Oct	Kumar Nitesh (India)	2–0	(China) Chen Xiaoyu	22–20	21–14	

=== Group C ===
Pos	Team	Pld	W	L	GF	GA	GD	PF	PA	PD	Qualification
1	Daisuke Fujihara (JPN) [3/4]	2	2	0	4	0	+4	84	34	+50	Qualification to elimination stage
2	Trịnh Anh Tuấn (VIE)	2	1	1	2	2	0	59	67	−8	Qualification to elimination stage
3	Singha Sangnil (THA)	2	0	2	0	4	−4	42	84	−42	

Source: Group C – standings

Date		Score		Game 1	Game 2	Game 3
20 Oct	Trịnh Anh Tuấn (Vietnam)	2–0	(Thailand) Singha Sangnil	21–13	21–12	
21 Oct	Daisuke Fujihara (Japan)	2–0	(Thailand) Singha Sangnil	21–12	21–5	
23 Oct	Daisuke Fujihara (Japan)	2–0	(Vietnam) Trịnh Anh Tuấn	2–7	21–10	

=== Group D ===
Pos	Team	Pld	W	L	GF	GA	GD	PF	PA	PD	Qualification
1	Manoj Sarkar (IND) [3/4]	2	2	0	4	0	+4	84	44	+40	Qualification to elimination stage
2	Xiong Lichuan (CHN) (H)	2	1	1	2	2	0	66	57	+9	Qualification to elimination stage
3	Zeeshan Gohar (PAK)	2	0	2	0	4	−4	35	84	−49	

Source: Group D – standings
(H) Host

Date		Score		Game 1	Game 2	Game 3
20 Oct	Zeeshan Gohar (Pakistan)	0–2	(China) Xiong Lichuan	8–21	7–21	
21 Oct	Manoj Sarkar (India)	2–0	(Pakistan) Zeeshan Gohar	21–8	21–12	
23 Oct	Manoj Sarkar (India)	2–0	(China) Xiong Lichuan	21–13	21–11	

=== Group E ===
Pos	Team	Pld	W	L	GF	GA	GD	PF	PA	PD	Qualification
1	Mongkhon Bunsun (THA) [5/6]	3	3	0	6	0	+6	126	43	+83	Qualification to elimination stage
2	Ukun Rukaendi (INA)	3	2	1	4	2	+2	116	65	+51	Qualification to elimination stage
3	Vary Sen (CAM)	3	1	2	2	4	−2	64	91	−27	
4	Munkhzul Munkhbayar (MGL)	3	0	3	0	6	−6	19	126	−107	

Source: Group E – standings

Date		Score		Game 1	Game 2	Game 3
20 Oct	Mongkhon Bunsun (Thailand)	2–0	(Mongolia) Munkhzul Munkhbayar	21–0	21–4	
20 Oct	Vary Sen (Cambodia)	0–2	(Indonesia) Ukun Rukaendi	10–21	5–21	
21 Oct	Mongkhon Bunsun (Thailand)	2–0	(Cambodia) Vary Sen	21–4	21–3	
21 Oct	Ukun Rukaendi (Indonesia)	2–0	(Mongolia) Munkhzul Munkhbayar	21–6	21–2	
23 Oct	Mongkhon Bunsun (Thailand)	2–0	(Indonesia) Ukun Rukaendi	21–19	21–13	
23 Oct	Vary Sen (Cambodia)	2–0	(Mongolia) Munkhzul Munkhbayar	21–5	21–2	

=== Group F ===
Pos	Team	Pld	W	L	GF	GA	GD	PF	PA	PD	Qualification
1	Joo Dong-jae (KOR) [5/6]	3	3	0	6	0	+6	126	29	+97	Qualification to elimination stage
2	Ashraf Al-Khaddam (IRQ)	3	2	1	4	2	+2	98	77	+21	Qualification to elimination stage
3	Feras Sheiha (SYR)	3	1	2	2	4	−2	73	109	−36	
4	Soronzobold Ganbold (MGL)	3	0	3	0	6	−6	44	126	−82	

Source: Group F – standings

Date		Score		Game 1	Game 2	Game 3
20 Oct	Joo Dong-jae (South Korea)	2–0	(Syria) Feras Sheiha	21–5	21–3	
20 Oct	Soronzobold Ganbold (Mongolia)	0–2	(Iraq) Ashraf Al-Khaddam	7–21	5–21	
21 Oct	Joo Dong-jae (South Korea)	2–0	(Mongolia) Soronzobold Ganbold	21–4	21–3	
21 Oct	Ashraf Al-Khaddam (Iraq)	2–0	(Syria) Feras Sheiha	21–11	21–12	
23 Oct	Joo Dong-jae (South Korea)	2–0	(Iraq) Ashraf Al-Khaddam	21–7	21–7	
23 Oct	Soronzobold Ganbold (Mongolia)	0–2	(Syria) Feras Sheiha	15–21	10–21	

== Elimination round ==
Top two ranked in each group qualified to the elimination round, the draw was decided after the previous round finished.

Round of 16
Xiong Lichuan (CHN)	22	21
Ukun Rukaendi (INA)	20	7
5/6	Mongkhon Bunsun (THA)	21	21
Huang Hsing-chih (TPE)	10	4
Chen Xiaoyu (CHN)	11	21	21
5/6	Joo Dong-jae (KOR)	21	16	19
Ashraf Al-Khaddam (IRQ)	6	6
Trịnh Anh Tuấn (VIE)	21	21

Quarter-finals
1	Pramod Bhagat (IND)	21	21
Xiong Lichuan (CHN)	14	8
3/4	Manoj Sarkar (IND)	13	21	12
5/6	Mongkhon Bunsun (THA)	21	6	21
Chen Xiaoyu (CHN)	10	14
3/4	Daisuke Fujihara (JPN)	21	21
Trịnh Anh Tuấn (VIE)	7	17
2	Kumar Nitesh (IND)	21	21

Semi-finals
1	Pramod Bhagat (IND)	21	21
5/6	Mongkhon Bunsun (THA)	13	12
3/4	Daisuke Fujihara (JPN)	16	7
2	Kumar Nitesh (IND)	21	21

Final
1	Pramod Bhagat (IND)	22	18	21
2	Kumar Nitesh (IND)	20	21	19
