= Badminton at the 2020 Summer Paralympics – Men's singles SL3 =

Men's singles SL3 at the XVI Paralympic Games
- Venue: Yoyogi National Gymnasium
- Dates: 1–4 September 2021
- Competitors: 6 from 5 nations

Medalists
1st place, gold medalist(s)		Pramod Bhagat	India
2nd place, silver medalist(s)		Daniel Bethell	Great Britain
3rd place, bronze medalist(s)		Manoj Sarkar	India

The men's singles SL3 tournament at the 2020 Summer Paralympics in Tokyo took place between 1 and 4 September 2021 at Yoyogi National Gymnasium.

== Seeds ==
These were the seeds for this event:

1. Pramod Bhagat (IND) (gold medalist)
2. Daniel Bethell (GBR) (silver medalist)

== Group stage ==
The draw of the group stage revealed on 26 August 2021. The group stage was played from 1 to 3 September. The top two winners of each group advanced to the knockout rounds.

=== Group A ===
Pos	Team	Pld	W	L	GF	GA	GD	PF	PA	PD	Pts	Qualification
1	Pramod Bhagat (IND)	2	2	0	4	1	+3	105	63	+42	2	Advance to semi-finals
2	Manoj Sarkar (IND)	2	1	1	3	2	+1	84	88	−4	1	Advance to semi-finals
3	Oleksandr Chyrkov (UKR)	2	0	2	0	4	−4	46	84	−38	0	

Source: TOCOG

Date	Time	Player 1	Score	Player 2	Set 1	Set 2	Set 3
1 Sep	21:20	Pramod Bhagat (India)	2–1	(India) Manoj Sarkar	21–10	21–23	21–9
2 Sep	16:40	Pramod Bhagat (India)	2–0	(Ukraine) Oleksandr Chyrkov	21–12	21–9	
3 Sep	7:30	Manoj Sarkar (India)	2–0	(Ukraine) Oleksandr Chyrkov	21–16	21–9	

=== Group B ===
Pos	Team	Pld	W	L	GF	GA	GD	PF	PA	PD	Pts	Qualification
1	Daniel Bethell (GBR)	2	2	0	4	0	+4	84	38	+46	2	Advance to semi-finals
2	Daisuke Fujihara (JPN) (H)	2	1	1	2	2	0	60	65	−5	1	Advance to semi-finals
3	Ukun Rukaendi (INA)	2	0	2	0	4	−4	43	84	−41	0	

Source: TOCOG
(H) Host

Date	Time	Player 1	Score	Player 2	Set 1	Set 2	Set 3
1 Sep	21:20	Daniel Bethell (United Kingdom)	2–0	(Japan) Daisuke Fujihara	21–11	21–7	
2 Sep	16:40	Ukun Rukaendi (Indonesia)	0–2	(Japan) Daisuke Fujihara	5–21	18–21	
3 Sep	11:00	Daniel Bethell (United Kingdom)	2–0	(Indonesia) Ukun Rukaendi	21–8	21–12	

== Finals ==
The knockout stage was played from 4 to 5 September.

Semi-finals
A1	Pramod Bhagat (IND)	21	21
B2	Daisuke Fujihara (JPN)	11	16
A2	Manoj Sarkar (IND)	8	10
B1	Daniel Bethell (GBR)	21	21

Gold medal match
A1	Pramod Bhagat (IND) (gold)	21	21
B1	Daniel Bethell (GBR) (silver)	14	17
Bronze medal match
B2	Daisuke Fujihara (JPN)	20	13
A2	Manoj Sarkar (IND) (bronze)	22	21
