= Mongkhon Bunsun =

Thai para-badminton player

Personal information
- Born: 14 April 1995 (age 31) Ratchaburi, Thailand

Sport
- Country: Thailand
- Sport: Badminton
- Handedness: Right

Men's singles SL3 Men's doubles SL3–SL4
- Highest ranking: 6 (MS 5 March 2024); 5 (MD with Siripong Teamarrom 31 May 2022)
- Current ranking: 9 (MS); 15 (MD with Siripong Teamarrom) (24 September 2024)
- BWF profile
Medal record
Men's para-badminton
Representing Thailand
Paralympic Games
Bronze medal – third place	2024 Paris	Men's singles
World Championships
Silver medal – second place	2024 Pattaya	Men's doubles
Bronze medal – third place	2026 Manama	Men's singles
World Abilitysport Games
Silver medal – second place	2019 Sharjah	Men's singles
Silver medal – second place	2019 Sharjah	Mixed doubles
Asian Para Games
Bronze medal – third place	2022 Hangzhou	Men's singles
ASEAN Para Games
Gold medal – first place	2023 Cambodia	Men's singles
Bronze medal – third place	2022 Surakarta	Men's singles
Bronze medal – third place	2022 Surakarta	Men's doubles
Bronze medal – third place	2023 Cambodia	Men's doubles

Mongkhon Bunsun (Thai: มงคล บุญสุน; born 14 April 1995) is a Thai para-badminton player. He competed at the 2024 Summer Paralympics, where he won the bronze medal match of the men's singles SL3 event against Daisuke Fujihara.

== Biography ==
Bunsun grew up in the border area of the western provinces in his early years. At the age of 2, he was diagnosed with jungle fever. With the help of herbal medicine, he was cured but his left leg later began to shrink and he eventually became disabled.

== Achievements ==
=== Paralympic Games ===
Men's singles SL3

Year	Venue	Opponent	Score	Result
2024	Porte de La Chapelle Arena, Paris, France	(Japan) Daisuke Fujihara	21–15, 21–15	Bronze

=== World Championships ===
Men's singles SL3

Year	Venue	Opponent	Score	Result
2026	Isa Sports City, Manama, Bahrain	(India) Pramod Bhagat	19–21, 17–21	Bronze

Men's doubles SL3–SL4

Year	Venue	Partner	Opponent	Score	Result
2024	Pattaya Exhibition and Convention Hall, Pattaya, Thailand	(Thailand) Siripong Teamarrom	(Indonesia) Dwiyoko (Indonesia) Fredy Setiawan	17–21, 14–21	Silver

=== World Abilitysport Games ===
Men's singles SL3

Year	Venue	Opponent	Score	Result
2019 (Note: This tournament uses a round robin system.)	American University of Sharjah, Sharjah, United Arab Emirates	(United Arab Emirates) Sultan Al Halyan	Walkover	Silver
2019	American University of Sharjah, Sharjah, United Arab Emirates	(India) Sharad Chandra Joshi	21–14, 21–18	Silver
2019	American University of Sharjah, Sharjah, United Arab Emirates	(India) Pramod Bhagat	18–21, 15–21	Silver

Mixed doubles SL3–SU5

Year	Venue	Partner	Opponent	Score	Result
2019	American University of Sharjah, Sharjah, United Arab Emirates	(Thailand) Miss Samownkorn Photisuppaiboon	(Pakistan) Zeeshan Gohar (Iraq) Raghad Maiesh	21–10, 21–8	Silver
2019	American University of Sharjah, Sharjah, United Arab Emirates	(Thailand) Miss Samownkorn Photisuppaiboon	(India) Sharad Chandra Joshi (Bahrain) Zainab Ali Yusuf	21–3, 21–8	Silver
2019	American University of Sharjah, Sharjah, United Arab Emirates	(Thailand) Miss Samownkorn Photisuppaiboon	(United Arab Emirates) Sultan Al Halyan (United Arab Emirates) Meera Abouhatab	Walkover	Silver
2019	American University of Sharjah, Sharjah, United Arab Emirates	(Thailand) Miss Samownkorn Photisuppaiboon	(India) Pramod Bhagat (India) Parul Parmar	4–21, 13–21	Silver

=== Asian Para Games ===
Men's singles SL3

Year	Venue	Opponent	Score	Result
2022	Binjiang Gymnasium, Hangzhou, China	(India) Pramod Bhagat	13–21, 12–21	Bronze

=== ASEAN Para Games ===
Men's singles WH1

Year	Venue	Opponent	Score	Result
2022	Edutorium Muhammadiyah University of Surakarta, Surakarta, Indonesia	(Indonesia) Maman Nurjaman	13–21, 21–19, 13–21	Bronze
2023	Morodok Techo Badminton Hall, Phnom Penh, Cambodia	(Indonesia) Maman Nurjaman	21–16, 21–6	Gold

Men's doubles WH1–WH2

Year	Venue	Partner	Opponent	Score	Result
2022	Edutorium Muhammadiyah University of Surakarta, Surakarta, Indonesia	(Thailand) Siripong Teamarrom	(Indonesia) Dwiyoko (Indonesia) Fredy Setiawan	15–21, 19–21	Bronze
2023	Morodok Techo Badminton Hall, Phnom Penh, Cambodia	(Thailand) Chawarat Kitichokwattana	(Indonesia) Dwiyoko (Indonesia) Fredy Setiawan	16–21, 15–21	Bronze

=== BWF Para Badminton World Circuit (1 runner-up) ===
The BWF Para Badminton World Circuit – Grade 2, Level 1, 2 and 3 tournaments has been sanctioned by the Badminton World Federation from 2022.

Men's doubles SL3–SL4

Year	Tournament	Level	Partner	Opponent	Score	Result
2022	Bahrain Para-Badminton International	Level 2	(Thailand) Siripong Teamarrom	(India) Kumar Nitesh (India) Tarun Dhillon	13–21, 7–21	(silver) Runner-up

=== International tournaments (2011–2021) (2 titles, 1 runner-up) ===
Men's singles SL3

Year	Tournament	Opponent	Score	Result
2021	Spanish Para-Badminton International	(England) Daniel Bethell	4–21, 9–21	(silver) Runner-up

Men's doubles SL3–SL4

Year	Tournament	Partner	Opponent	Score	Result
2019	Thailand Para-Badminton International	(Thailand) Siripong Teamarrom	(India) Pramod Bhagat (India) Manoj Sarkar	21–16, 8–21, 21–14	(gold) Winner
2019	Denmark Para-Badminton International	(Thailand) Siripong Teamarrom	(India) Umesh Vikram Kumar (India) Suhas Lalinakere Yathiraj	14–21, 21–8, 21–12	(gold) Winner
