= Kumar Nitesh =

Indian para-badminton player (born 1994)

Nitesh Kumar
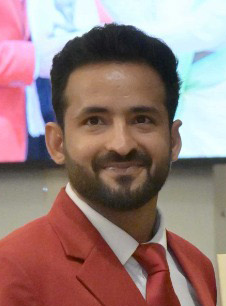
- Kumar in January 2025

Personal information
- Born: 30 December 1994 (age 31) Bas Kirtan, Rajasthan, India
- Years active: 2016–present

Sport
- Country: India
- Sport: Badminton
- Handedness: Right

Men's singles SL3 Men's doubles SL3–SL4
- Highest ranking: Men's singles 3 (2022); Men's doubles 2; with Tarun Dhillon (2022)
- Current ranking: Men's singles: 1 Men's doubles: 5
- BWF profile
Medal record
Men's para-badminton
Representing India
Paralympic Games
Gold medal – first place	2024 Paris	Men's singles
World Championships
Silver medal – second place	2019 Basel	Men's doubles
Silver medal – second place	2022 Tokyo	Men's singles
Bronze medal – third place	2024 Pattaya	Men's singles
Bronze medal – third place	2026 Manama	Men's singles
Asian Para Games
Gold medal – first place	2022 Hangzhou	Men's doubles
Silver medal – second place	2022 Hangzhou	Men's singles
Bronze medal – third place	2018 Jakarta	Men's doubles
Bronze medal – third place	2022 Hangzhou	Mixed doubles

Nitesh Kumar (born 30 December 1994) is an Indian para-badminton player. He won a gold at the 2024 Paris Paralympics in the men's singles SL3 category. He is a two-time silver and one-time bronze medalist at the World Championships. Kumar has won one gold, one silver and two bronze medals at the Asian Para Games over the years.

== Early life and education ==
Kumar was born on 30 December 1994 in Bas Kirtan, Rajasthan. In 2009, he lost his left leg in a train accident in Visakhapatnam, Andhra Pradesh. After bed ridden for many months, he prepared for IIT entrance exam for over a year and joined Indian Institute of Technology, Mandi in 2014. He started playing badminton at IIT and in 2016 represented the Haryana team at the Para National Championships. He resides at Karnal, Haryana and is supported by sports NGO, Olympic Gold Quest.

== Career ==
He made his international debut in 2016. In 2017, he won his first title at the Irish Para-Badminton International. Later, he took part and won matches at BWF Para Badminton World Circuit and won a gold medal at the 2022 Asian Para Games at Hangzhou, China.

He became the world number 3 in the SL3 category on 14 June 2022.

=== Coaching career ===
In 2019, he started working as Senior Badminton Coach at the Department of Sports and Youth Affairs, Haryana.

== Achievements ==
=== Paralympic Games ===
Men's singles SL3

Year	Venue	Opponent	Score	Result
2024	Porte de La Chapelle Arena, Paris, France	(United Kingdom) Daniel Bethell	21–14, 18–21, 23–21	Gold

=== World Championships ===
Men's singles

Year	Venue	Opponent	Score	Result
2022	Yoyogi National Gymnasium, Tokyo, Japan	(India) Pramod Bhagat	19–21, 19–21	Silver
2024	Pattaya Exhibition and Convention Hall, Pattaya, Thailand	(England) Daniel Bethell	18–21, 22–20, 14–21	Bronze
2026	Isa Sports City, Manama, Bahrain	(Indonesia) Muhammad Al Imran	21–12, 17–21, 11–21	Bronze

Men's doubles

Year	Venue	Partner	Opponent	Score	Result
2019	St. Jakobshalle, Basel, Switzerland	(India) Tarun Dhillon	(India) Pramod Bhagat (India) Manoj Sarkar	21–14, 15–21, 16–21	Silver

=== Asian Para Games ===
Men's singles

Year	Venue	Opponent	Score	Result
2022	Binjiang Gymnasium, Hangzhou, China	(India) Pramod Bhagat	20–22, 21–18, 19–21	Silver

Men's doubles

Year	Venue	Partner	Opponent	Score	Result
2018	Istora Gelora Bung Karno, Jakarta, Indonesia	(India) Anand Kumar Boregowda	(South Korea) Jeon Sun-woo (South Korea) Joo Dong-jae	16–21, 11–21	Bronze
2022	Binjiang Gymnasium, Hangzhou, China	(India) Sukant Kadam	(Indonesia) Dwiyoko (Indonesia) Fredy Setiawan	9–21, 21–19, 22–20	Gold

Mixed doubles

Year	Venue	Partner	Opponent	Score	Result
2022	Binjiang Gymnasium, Hangzhou, China	(India) Thulasimathi Murugesan	(Indonesia) Fredy Setiawan (Indonesia) Khalimatus Sadiyah	17–21, 12–21	Bronze

=== BWF Para Badminton World Circuit (12 titles, 11 runners-up) ===
The BWF Para Badminton World Circuit – Grade 2, Level 1, 2 and 3 tournaments has been sanctioned by the Badminton World Federation from 2022.

Men's singles

Year	Tournament	Level	Opponent	Score	Result
2022	Spanish Para Badminton International II	Level 2	(India) Pramod Bhagat	21–17, 17–21, 17–21	(silver) Runner-up
2022	Brazil Para Badminton International	Level 2	(Japan) Daisuke Fujihara	21–15, 18–21, 21–18	(gold) Winner
2022	Dubai Para Badminton International	Level 2	(India) Pramod Bhagat	21–19, 17–21, 17–21	(silver) Runner-up
2023	Brazil Para Badminton International	Level 2	(India) Pramod Bhagat	21–12, 21–13	(gold) Winner
2023	Bahrain Para Badminton International	Level 2	(India) Pramod Bhagat	16–21, 17–21	(silver) Runner-up
2023	Western Australia Para Badminton International	Level 2	(India) Manoj Sarkar	21–14, 21–14	(gold) Winner
2024	Spanish Para Badminton International II	Level 2	(India) Manoj Sarkar	21–17, 21–14	(gold) Winner
2024	Spanish Para Badminton International I	Level 1	(Ukraine) Oleksandr Chyrkov	21–11, 21–13	(gold) Winner
2024	4 Nations Para Badminton International	Level 1	(England) Daniel Bethell	11–21, 7–21	(silver) Runner-up

Men's doubles

Year	Tournament	Level	Partner	Opponent	Score	Result
2022	Spanish Para Badminton International II	Level 2	(India) Sukant Kadam	(India) Pramod Bhagat (India) Manoj Sarkar	19–21, 21–11, 11–21	(silver) Runner-up
2022	Brazil Para Badminton International	Level 2	(India) Tarun Dhillon	(India) Mohammad Arwaz Ansari (India) Deep Ranjan Bisoyee	21–13, 17–21, 18–21	(silver) Runner-up
2022	Bahrain Para Badminton International	Level 2	(India) Tarun Dhillon	(Thailand) Mongkhon Bunsun (Thailand) Siripong Teamarrom	21–13, 21–7	(gold) Winner
2023	Spanish Para Badminton International II	Level 2	(India) Tarun Dhillon	(India) Pramod Bhagat (India) Sukant Kadam	20–22, 21–12, 9–21	(silver) Runner-up
2023	Thailand Para Badminton International	Level 2	(India) Tarun Dhillon	(India) Pramod Bhagat (India) Sukant Kadam	21–18, 14–21, 19–21	(silver) Runner-up
2023	Bahrain Para Badminton International	Level 2	(India) Tarun Dhillon	(India) Pramod Bhagat (India) Sukant Kadam	24–22, 9–21, 14–21	(silver) Runner-up
2023	Canada Para Badminton International	Level 1	(India) Tarun Dhillon	(India) Nilesh Gaikwad (India) Nehal Gupta	21–12, 21–8	(gold) Winner
2023	Canada Para Badminton International	Level 1	(India) Tarun Dhillon	(France) Guillaume Gailly (Canada) William Roussy	21–13, 21–12	(gold) Winner
2023	Canada Para Badminton International	Level 1	(India) Tarun Dhillon	(India) Deep Ranjan Bisoyee (India) Manoj Sarkar	21–9, 17–21, 21–16	(gold) Winner
2023	Canada Para Badminton International	Level 1	(India) Tarun Dhillon	(India) Pramod Bhagat (India) Sukant Kadam	11–21, 21–16, 21–16	(gold) Winner
2022	Bahrain Para Badminton International	Level 2	(India) Tarun Dhillon	(Thailand) Mongkhon Bunsun (Thailand) Siripong Teamarrom	21–13, 21–7	(gold) Winner
2023	Spanish Para Badminton International II	Level 2	(India) Tarun Dhillon	(India) Pramod Bhagat (India) Sukant Kadam	20–22, 21–12, 9–21	(silver) Runner-up

Mixed doubles

Year	Tournament	Level	Partner	Opponent	Score	Result
2023	Brazil Para-Badminton International	Level 2	(India) Thulasimathi Murugesan	(Indonesia) Hikmat Ramdani (Indonesia) Leani Ratri Oktila	18–21, 9–21	(silver) Runner-up
2023	Uganda Para Badminton International	Level 3	(India) Thulasimathi Murugesan	(India) Naveen Sivakumar (India) Palak Kohli	21–12, 21–11	(gold) Winner
2023	Western Australia Para Badminton International	Level 2	(India) Thulasimathi Murugesan	(Indonesia) Fredy Setiawan (Indonesia) Khalimatus Sadiyah	15–21, 22–20, 21–19	(gold) Winner
2024	Spanish Para Badminton International II	Level 2	(India) Thulasimathi Murugesan	(India) Chirag Baretha (India) Mandeep Kaur	21–11, 21–16	(gold) Winner
2024	Spanish Para Badminton International I	Level 1	(India) Thulasimathi Murugesan	(France) Lucas Mazur (France) Faustine Noël	22–20, 21–15	(gold) Winner

=== International Tournaments (7 runners-up) ===
Men's singles

Year	Tournament	Opponent	Score	Result
2018	Uganda Para Badminton International	(India) Umesh Vikram Kumar	21–17, 15–21, 15–21	(silver) Runner-up
2020	Peru Para Badminton International	(India) Pramod Bhagat	18–21, 21–15, 14–21	(silver) Runner-up
2021	Dubai Para Badminton International	(India) Pramod Bhagat	17–21, 18–21	(silver) Runner-up

Men's doubles

Year	Tournament	Partner	Opponent	Score	Result
2018	Dubai Para Badminton International	(Indonesia) Fredy Setiawan	(Indonesia) Ukun Rukaendi (Indonesia) Hary Susanto	17–21, 15–21	(silver) Runner-up
2019	Turkish Para Badminton International	(India) Tarun Dhillon	(Indonesia) Dwiyoko (Indonesia) Fredy Setiawan	14–21, 15–21	(silver) Runner-up
2019	Irish Para Badminton International	(India) Tarun Dhillon	(India) Pramod Bhagat (India) Manoj Sarkar	21–13, 18–21, 21–23	(silver) Runner-up
2021	Dubai Para Badminton International	(India) Sukant Kadam	(India) Pramod Bhagat (India) Manoj Sarkar	18–21, 16–21	(silver) Runner-up
