= Pramod Bhagat =

Indian para-badminton player

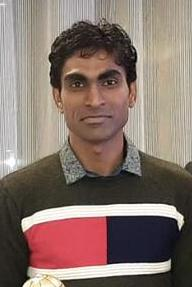
- Bhagat in 2020

Personal information
- Born: 4 June 1988 (age 38) Hajipur, Vaishali, Bihar, India.
- Years active: 2006–present

Sport
- Country: India
- Sport: Badminton
- Handedness: Left

Men's singles SL3 Men's doubles SL3–SU5 Mixed doubles SL3–SU5
- Highest ranking: 1 (MS 1 January 2019); 1 (MD with Sukant Kadam 31 October 2023); 4 (XD with Manisha Ramadass 31 October 2023)
- Current ranking: 2 (MS); 1 (MD with Sukant Kadam); 4 (XD with Manisha Ramadass) (27 February 2024)
- BWF profile
Medal record
Men's para-badminton
Representing India
Paralympic Games
Gold medal – first place	2020 Tokyo	Men's singles
World Championships
Gold medal – first place	2009 Seoul	Men's singles
Gold medal – first place	2013 Dortmund	Men's doubles
Gold medal – first place	2015 Stoke Mandeville	Men's singles
Gold medal – first place	2019 Basel	Men's singles
Gold medal – first place	2019 Basel	Men's doubles
Gold medal – first place	2022 Tokyo	Men's singles
Gold medal – first place	2024 Pattaya	Men's singles
Gold medal – first place	2026 Manama	Men's singles
Gold medal – first place	2026 Manama	Men's doubles
Silver medal – second place	2015 Stoke Mandeville	Men's doubles
Silver medal – second place	2022 Tokyo	Men's doubles
Bronze medal – third place	2007 Bangkok	Men's singles
Bronze medal – third place	2007 Bangkok	Men's doubles
Bronze medal – third place	2017 Ulsan	Men's singles
Bronze medal – third place	2024 Pattaya	Men's doubles
Bronze medal – third place	2024 Pattaya	Mixed doubles
World Abilitysport Games
Gold medal – first place	2019 Sharjah	Men's singles
Gold medal – first place	2019 Sharjah	Mixed doubles
Silver medal – second place	2019 Sharjah	Men's doubles
Asian Para Games
Gold medal – first place	2018 Jakarta	Men's singles
Gold medal – first place	2022 Hangzhou	Men's singles
Bronze medal – third place	2018 Jakarta	Men's doubles
Bronze medal – third place	2014 Incheon	Men's singles
Bronze medal – third place	2022 Hangzhou	Men's doubles
Bronze medal – third place	2022 Hangzhou	Mixed doubles
Asian Championships
Bronze medal – third place	2016 Beijing	Men's singles
Bronze medal – third place	2016 Beijing	Men's doubles

Pramod Bhagat (born 4 June 1988) is an Indian professional Para-badminton player from Vaishali district, Bihar. He is currently ranked world number 2 in para-badminton men's singles SL3, and won a gold medal at the 2020 Summer Paralympics in Men's singles SL3.

Bhagat is currently serving an 18-month competition ban set to expire in September 2025 for an anti-doping rule violation relating to three missed tests.

== Early life ==
Pramod was born on 4 June 1988 in Atabira, Bargarh district, Odisha. He is one of six brothers and sisters. When he was five years old he developed polio, leading to a disability affecting his left leg. At the age of 13, he went to watch a badminton match and was fascinated with the game. For the next 2 years, he was deeply engulfed in the game with footwork, fitness, and fixture of the game. Pramod played his first tournament against normal category players when he was 15 years old. He was encouraged by spectators, which motivated him to move ahead in his badminton career.

== Achievements ==
=== Paralympic Games ===
Men's singles SL3

Year	Venue	Opponent	Score	Result
2020	Yoyogi National Gymnasium, Tokyo, Japan	(United Kingdom) Daniel Bethell	21–14, 21–17	Gold

=== World Championships ===
Men's singles SL3

Year	Venue	Opponent	Score	Result
2007	Gymnasium 1, Bangkok, Thailand	(Thailand) Subpong Meepian	17–21, 13–21	Bronze
2009	Olympic Fencing Gymnasium, Seoul, South Korea	(Thailand) Subpong Meepian	21–10, 21–13	Gold
2015	Stoke Mandeville Stadium, Stoke Mandeville, England	(Vietnam) Phạm Đức Trung	16–21, 21–3, 21–16	Gold
2017	Dongchun Gymnasium, Ulsan, South Korea	(Indonesia) Ukun Rukaendi	15–21, 20–22	Bronze
2019	St. Jakobshalle, Basel, Switzerland	(England) Daniel Bethell	6–21, 21–14, 21–5	Gold
2022	Yoyogi National Gymnasium, Tokyo, Japan	(India) Kumar Nitesh	21–19, 21–19	Gold
2024	Pattaya Exhibition and Convention Hall, Pattaya, Thailand	(England) Daniel Bethell	14–21, 21–15, 21–14	Gold
2026	Isa Sports City, Manama, Bahrain	(Indonesia) Muhammad Al Imran	21–12, 21–18	Gold

Men's doubles SL3–SU5

Year	Venue	Partner	Opponent	Score	Result
2007	Gymnasium 1, Bangkok, Thailand	(India) Himagiri Yernagula	(Thailand) Subpong Meepian (Thailand) Bunjob Wongkumkerl	19–21, 15–21	Bronze
2007	Gymnasium 1, Bangkok, Thailand	(India) Himagiri Yernagula	(Spain) Simón Cruz Mondejar (Spain) Alfonso Otero	21–10, 21–17	Bronze
2007	Gymnasium 1, Bangkok, Thailand	(India) Himagiri Yernagula	(Hong Kong) Tung Fung Kwong (Hong Kong) Tsang Chiu Pong	20–22, 20–22	Bronze
2013	Helmut-Körnig-Halle, Dortmund, Germany	(India) Manoj Sarkar	(Japan) Taku Hiroi (Japan) Toshiaki Suenaga	21–15, 10–21, 21–18	Gold
2015	Stoke Mandeville Stadium, Stoke Mandeville, England	(India) Tarun Dhillon	(India) Anand Kumar Boregowda (India) Manoj Sarkar	21–7, 14–21, 6–21	Silver
2019	St. Jakobshalle, Basel, Switzerland	(India) Manoj Sarkar	(India) Kumar Nitesh (India) Tarun Dhillon	14–21, 21–15, 21–16	Gold
2022	Yoyogi National Gymnasium, Tokyo, Japan	(India) Manoj Sarkar	(Indonesia) Hikmat Ramdani (Indonesia) Ukun Rukaendi	21–14, 18–21, 13–21	Silver
2024	Pattaya Exhibition and Convention Hall, Pattaya, Thailand	(India) Sukant Kadam	(Thailand) Mongkhon Bunsun (Thailand) Siripong Teamarrom	16–21, 16–21	Bronze
2026	Isa Sports City, Manama, Bahrain	(India) Sukant Kadam	(India) Jagadesh Dilli (India) Naveen Sivakumar	21–19, 21–16	Gold

Mixed doubles SL3–SU5

Year	Venue	Partner	Opponent	Score	Result
2024	Pattaya Exhibition and Convention Hall, Pattaya, Thailand	(India) Manisha Ramadass	(Indonesia) Fredy Setiawan (Indonesia) Khalimatus Sadiyah	15–21, 19–21	Bronze

=== World Abilitysport Games ===
Men's singles SL3

Year	Venue	Opponent	Score	Result
2019 (Note: This tournament uses a round robin system.)	American University of Sharjah, Sharjah, United Arab Emirates	(India) Sharad Chandra Joshi	21–19, 20–22, 21–8	Gold
2019	American University of Sharjah, Sharjah, United Arab Emirates	(United Arab Emirates) Sultan Al Halyan	Walkover	Gold
2019	American University of Sharjah, Sharjah, United Arab Emirates	(Thailand) Mongkhon Bunsun	21–18, 21–15	Gold

Men's doubles SL3–SU5

Year	Venue	Partner	Opponent	Score	Result
2019 (Note: This tournament uses a round robin system.)	American University of Sharjah, Sharjah, United Arab Emirates	(India) Sukant Kadam	(Thailand) Pricha Somsiri (Thailand) Chok-Uthaikul Watcharaphon	14–21, 13–21	Silver
2019	American University of Sharjah, Sharjah, United Arab Emirates	(India) Sukant Kadam	(Thailand) Mongkhon Bunsun (Iraq) Ramel Syawesh	21–13, 21–5	Silver
2019	American University of Sharjah, Sharjah, United Arab Emirates	(India) Sukant Kadam	(India) Sharad Chandra Joshi (Thailand) Nattaphon Thaweesap	21–13, 21–4	Silver
2019	American University of Sharjah, Sharjah, United Arab Emirates	(India) Sukant Kadam	(United Arab Emirates) Sultan Al Halyan (Yemen) Saleh Mohammed Ali	Walkover	Silver

Mixed doubles SL3–SU5

Year	Venue	Partner	Opponent	Score	Result
2019 (Note: This tournament uses a round robin system.)	American University of Sharjah, Sharjah, United Arab Emirates	(India) Parul Parmar	(India) Sharad Chandra Joshi (Bahrain) Zainab Ali Yusuf	21–7, 21–5	Gold
2019	American University of Sharjah, Sharjah, United Arab Emirates	(India) Parul Parmar	(Pakistan) Zeeshan Gohar (Iraq) Raghad Maiesh	21–8, 21–8	Gold
2019	American University of Sharjah, Sharjah, United Arab Emirates	(India) Parul Parmar	(United Arab Emirates) Sultan Al Halyan (United Arab Emirates) Meera Abouhatab	Walkover	Gold
2019	American University of Sharjah, Sharjah, United Arab Emirates	(India) Parul Parmar	(Thailand) Mongkhon Bunsun (Thailand) Miss Samownkorn Photisuppaiboon	21–4, 21–13	Gold

=== Asian Para Games ===
Men's singles SL3

Year	Venue	Opponent	Score	Result
2014	Gyeyang Gymnasium, Incheon, South Korea	(India) Manoj Sarkar	16–21, 21–19, 18–21	Bronze
2018	Istora Gelora Bung Karno, Jakarta, Indonesia	(Indonesia) Ukun Rukaendi	21–18, 22–20	Gold
2022	Binjiang Gymnasium, Hangzhou, China	(India) Kumar Nitesh	22–20, 18–21, 21–19	Gold

Men's doubles SL3–SU5

Year	Venue	Partner	Opponent	Score	Result
2018	Istora Gelora Bung Karno, Jakarta, Indonesia	(India) Manoj Sarkar	(Indonesia) Dwiyoko (Indonesia) Fredy Setiawan	13–21, 18–21	Bronze
2022	Binjiang Gymnasium, Hangzhou, China	(India) Sukant Kadam	(Indonesia) Dwiyoko (Indonesia) Fredy Setiawan	22–20, 21–23, 12–21	Bronze

Mixed doubles SL3–SU5

Year	Venue	Partner	Opponent	Score	Result
2022	Binjiang Gymnasium, Hangzhou, China	(India) Manisha Ramdass	(Indonesia) Hikmat Ramdani (Indonesia) Leani Ratri Oktila	19–21, 14–21	Bronze

=== Asian Championships ===
Men's singles SL3

Year	Venue	Opponent	Score	Result
2016	China Administration of Sport for Persons with Disabilities, Beijing, China	(India) Manoj Sarkar	10–21, 18–21	Bronze

Men's doubles SL3–SU5

Year	Venue	Partner	Opponent	Score	Result
2016	China Administration of Sport for Persons with Disabilities, Beijing, China	(India) Sukant Kadam	(Malaysia) Muhammad Huzairi Abdul Malek (Malaysia) Bakri Omar	21–18, 11–21, 16–21	Bronze

=== BWF Para Badminton World Circuit (16 Titles, 14 Runners-Up) ===
The BWF Para Badminton World Circuit – Grade 2, Level 1, 2 and 3 tournaments has been sanctioned by the Badminton World Federation from 2022.

Men's singles SL3

Year	Tournament	Level	Opponent	Score	Result
2022	Spanish Para-Badminton International II	Level 2	(India) Kumar Nitesh	17–21, 21–17, 21–17	(gold) Winner
2022	Spanish Para-Badminton International I	Level 1	(England) Daniel Bethell	9–21, 13–21	(silver) Runner-up
2022	Bahrain Para-Badminton International	Level 2	(England) Daniel Bethell	Walkover	(gold) Winner
2022	Dubai Para-Badminton International	Level 2	(India) Kumar Nitesh	19–21, 21–17, 21–17	(gold) Winner
2022	Canada Para-Badminton International	Level 1	(England) Daniel Bethell	14–21, 21–9, 15–21	(silver) Runner-up
2022	4 Nations Para-Badminton International	Level 1	(England) Daniel Bethell	17–21, 9–21	(silver) Runner-up
2022	Thailand Para-Badminton International	Level 1	(England) Daniel Bethell	13–21, 19–21	(silver) Runner-up
2023	Spanish Para-Badminton International II	Level 2	(England) Daniel Bethell	18–21, 8–21	(silver) Runner-up
2023	Spanish Para-Badminton International I	Level 1	(England) Daniel Bethell	6–21, 18–21	(silver) Runner-up
2023	Brazil Para-Badminton International	Level 2	(India) Kumar Nitesh	12–21, 13–21	(silver) Runner-up
2023	Thailand Para-Badminton International	Level 2	(England) Daniel Bethell	21–18, 0–0 retired	(gold) Winner
2023	Bahrain Para-Badminton International	Level 2	(India) Kumar Nitesh	21–16, 21–17	(gold) Winner
2023	Canada Para-Badminton International	Level 1	(England) Daniel Bethell	12–21, 13–21	(silver) Runner-up
2023	4 Nations Para-Badminton International	Level 1	(England) Daniel Bethell	8–21, 10–21	(silver) Runner-up
2023	Japan Para-Badminton International	Level 2	(India) Manoj Sarkar	21–16, 21–19	(gold) Winner
2023	Dubai Para-Badminton International	Level 1	(England) Daniel Bethell	17–21, 8–21	(silver) Runner-up
2026	Spanish Para Badminton International	Level 1	(India) Kumar Nitesh	10–21, 17–21	(silver) Runner-up

Men's doubles SL3–SU5

Year	Tournament	Level	Partner	Opponent	Score	Result
2022	Spanish Para-Badminton International II	Level 2	(India) Manoj Sarkar	(India) Sukant Kadam (India) Kumar Nitesh	21–19, 11–21, 21–11	(gold) Winner
2022	Thailand Para-Badminton International	Level 1	(India) Sukant Kadam	(Indonesia) Dwiyoko (Indonesia) Fredy Setiawan	21–18, 21–13	(gold) Winner
2023	Spanish Para-Badminton International II	Level 2	(India) Sukant Kadam	(India) Kumar Nitesh (India) Tarun Dhillon	22–20, 12–21, 21–9	(gold) Winner
2023	Brazil Para-Badminton International	Level 2	(India) Sukant Kadam	(South Korea) Joo Dong-jae (South Korea) Shin Kyung-hwan	22–20, 21–19	(gold) Winner
2023	Thailand Para-Badminton International	Level 2	(India) Sukant Kadam	(India) Kumar Nitesh (India) Tarun Dhillon	18–21, 21–14, 21–19	(gold) Winner
2023	Bahrain Para-Badminton International	Level 2	(India) Sukant Kadam	(India) Kumar Nitesh (India) Tarun Dhillon	22–24, 21–9, 21–14	(gold) Winner
2023	4 Nations Para-Badminton International	Level 1	(India) Sukant Kadam	(India) Deep Ranjan Bisoyee (India) Manoj Sarkar	21–17, 21–17	(gold) Winner
2026	Spanish Para Badminton International	Level 1	(India) Sukant Kadam	(India) Naveen Sivakumar (India) Surya Kant Yadav	16–21, 21–12, 15–21	(silver) Runner-up

Mixed doubles SL3–SU5

Year	Tournament	Level	Partner	Opponent	Score	Result
2022	Spanish Para-Badminton International II	Level 2	(India) Palak Kohli	(India) Ruthick Ragupathi (India) Manasi Girishchandra Joshi	14–21, 21–11, 21–14	(gold) Winner
2022	Bahrain Para-Badminton International	Level 2	(India) Manisha Ramadass	(Thailand) Siripong Teamarrom (Thailand) Nipada Saensupa	21–14, 21–11	(gold) Winner
2023	4 Nations Para-Badminton International	Level 1	(India) Manisha Ramadass	(Indonesia) Hikmat Ramdani (Indonesia) Leani Ratri Oktila	17–21, 17–21	(silver) Runner-up
2023	Dubai Para-Badminton International	Level 1	(India) Manisha Ramadass	(Indonesia) Hikmat Ramdani (Indonesia) Leani Ratri Oktila	14–21, 11–21	(silver) Runner-up
2026	Spanish Para Badminton International	Level 1	(India) Manisha Ramadass	(India) Nitesh Kumar (India) Thulasimathi Murugesan	21–15, 24–22	(gold) Winner

=== International tournaments (2011–2021) (18 titles, 10 runners-up) ===
Men's singles SL3

Year	Tournament	Opponent	Score	Result
2016	Indonesia Para-Badminton International	(Indonesia) Ukun Rukaendi	21–15, 21–13	(gold) Winner
2017	Thailand Para-Badminton International	(India) Manoj Sarkar	20–22, 21–14, 21–14	(gold) Winner
2018	Dubai Para-Badminton International	(India) Manoj Sarkar	3–6 retired	(silver) Runner-up
2018	Thailand Para-Badminton International	(India) Manoj Sarkar	21–18, 21–9	(gold) Winner
2018	Australia Para-Badminton International	(Indonesia) Ukun Rukaendi	21–16, 21–18	(gold) Winner
2019	Turkish Para-Badminton International	(Japan) Daisuke Fujihara	21–19, 21–17	(gold) Winner
2019	Dubai Para-Badminton International	(England) Daniel Bethell	15–21, 21–18, 21–13	(gold) Winner
2019	Uganda Para-Badminton International	(India) Umesh Vikram Kumar	24–22, 21–10	(gold) Winner
2019	Irish Para-Badminton International	(England) Daniel Bethell	21–17, 17–21, 21–10	(gold) Winner
2019	Thailand Para-Badminton International	(India) Manoj Sarkar	9–11 retired	(silver) Runner-up
2019	China Para-Badminton International	(England) Daniel Bethell	19–21, 21–13, 21–14	(gold) Winner
2019	Japan Para-Badminton International	(England) Daniel Bethell	16–21, 19–21	(silver) Runner-up
2020	Brazil Para-Badminton International	(India) Manoj Sarkar	22–20, 23–21	(gold) Winner
2020	Peru Para-Badminton International	(India) Kumar Nitesh	21–18, 15–21, 21–14	(gold) Winner
2021	Dubai Para-Badminton International	(India) Kumar Nitesh	21–17, 21–18	(gold) Winner
2021	Uganda Para-Badminton International	(India) Manoj Sarkar	19–21, 16–21	(silver) Runner-up

Men's doubles SL3–SU5

Year	Tournament	Partner	Opponent	Score	Result
2017	Thailand Para-Badminton International	(India) Manoj Sarkar	(Indonesia) Fredy Setiawan (Japan) Daisuke Fujihara	20–22, 16–21	(silver) Runner-up
2018	Australia Para-Badminton International	(India) Sukant Kadam	(Indonesia) Dwiyoko (Indonesia) Fredy Setiawan	23–25, 24–22, 20–22	(silver) Runner-up
2019	Uganda Para-Badminton International	(India) Manoj Sarkar	(France) Guillaume Gailly (France) Mathieu Thomas	21–13, 21–11	(gold) Winner
2019	Canada Para-Badminton International	(India) Manoj Sarkar	(Indonesia) Dwiyoko (Indonesia) Fredy Setiawan	19–21, 10–21	(silver) Runner-up
2019	Irish Para-Badminton International	(India) Manoj Sarkar	(India) Kumar Nitesh (India) Tarun Dhillon	13–21, 21–18, 23–21	(gold) Winner
2019	Thailand Para-Badminton International	(India) Manoj Sarkar	(Thailand) Mongkhon Bunsun (Thailand) Siripong Teamarrom	16–21, 21–8, 14–21	(silver) Runner-up
2019	China Para-Badminton International	(India) Manoj Sarkar	(India) Umesh Vikram Kumar (India) Suhas Lalinakere Yathiraj	18–21, 21–16, 21–15	(gold) Winner
2020	Brazil Para-Badminton International	(India) Manoj Sarkar	(China) Chen Xiaoyu (China) Gao Yuyang	21–11, 21–7	(gold) Winner
2020	Peru Para-Badminton International	(India) Manoj Sarkar	(France) Guillaume Gailly (France) Mathieu Thomas	21–19, 21–9	(gold) Winner
2021	Dubai Para-Badminton International	(India) Manoj Sarkar	(India) Sukant Kadam (India) Kumar Nitesh	21–18, 21–16	(gold) Winner
2021	Uganda Para-Badminton International	(India) Manoj Sarkar	(India) Mohammad Arwaz Ansari (India) Deep Ranjan Bisoyee	21–10, 20–22, 15–21	(silver) Runner-up

Mixed doubles SL3–SU5

Year	Tournament	Partner	Opponent	Score	Result
2021	Uganda Para-Badminton International	(India) Palak Kohli	(India) Ruthick Ragupathi (India) Manasi Girishchandra Joshi	19–21, 16–21	(silver) Runner-up

== Medals ==
=== International medals ===
Year	Gold medal	Silver medal	Bronze medal	Total
2013	1			1
2014			1	1
2015	1	1		2
2016	1		3	4
2017	1	1	1	3
2018	3	2	4	9
2019	12	5	4	21
2020	4			4
2021	1			1
Total	24	9	13	46

* Statistics were last updated on 24 March 2020.

== Awards ==
- 2019 – Arjuna Award
- 2019 – Biju Patnaik Sports Award Odisha
- 2021 – Khel Ratna Award, highest sporting honour of India.
- 2022 - Padma Shri
