= Badminton at the 2023 European Para Championships – Men's singles SL3 =

Badminton's men's singles SL3 at the 2023 European Para Championships
- Venue: Rotterdam Ahoy, Rotterdam
- Dates: 15 – 20 August
- Competitors: 13 from 9 nations

Medalists
| gold medal | Daniel Bethell | Great Britain |
| silver medal | Oleksandr Chyrkov | Ukraine |
| bronze medal | William Smith | Great Britain |
| bronze medal | Mathieu Thomas | France |

The men's singles SL3 badminton tournament at the 2023 European Para Championships was played from 15 to 20 August 2023 in Rotterdam Ahoy, Rotterdam. A total of 13 players competed at the tournament, four of whom was seeded.

== Competition schedule ==
Play took place between 15 and 20 August.

| GS | Group stage | ¼ | Quarterfinals | ½ | Semifinals | F | Final |

| Events | Tue 15 | Wed 16 | Thu 17 | Fri 18 | Sat 19 | Sun 20 |
|---|---|---|---|---|---|---|
| Men's singles SL3 | GS | GS | GS | ¼ | ½ | F |

== Seeds ==
The following players were seeded:

1. Daniel Bethell (GBR) (champion; gold medalist)
2. Oleksandr Chyrkov (UKR) (final; silver medalist)
3. William Smith (GBR) (semi-finals; bronze medalist)
4. Mathieu Thomas (FRA) (semi-finals; bronze medalist)

== Group stage ==
=== Group A ===
| Pos | Team | Pld | W | L | GF | GA | GD | PF | PA | PD | Qualification |
|---|---|---|---|---|---|---|---|---|---|---|---|
| 1 | Daniel Bethell (GBR) [1] | 2 | 2 | 0 | 4 | 0 | +4 | 84 | 28 | +56 | Qualification to elimination stage |
| 2 | Colin Leslie (GBR) | 2 | 1 | 1 | 2 | 2 | 0 | 62 | 57 | +5 | Qualification to elimination stage |
| 3 | Margus Hoop (EST) | 2 | 0 | 2 | 0 | 4 | −4 | 23 | 84 | −61 | |

Source: Group A – standings

| Date | | Score | | Game 1 | Game 2 | Game 3 |
|---|---|---|---|---|---|---|
| 15 August | Daniel Bethell (United Kingdom) | 2–0 | (Estonia) Margus Hoop | 21–5 | 21–3 | |
| 16 August | Daniel Bethell (United Kingdom) | 2–0 | (United Kingdom) Colin Leslie | 21–8 | 21–12 | |
| 17 August | Margus Hoop (Estonia) | 0–2 | (United Kingdom) Colin Leslie | 9–21 | 6–21 | |

=== Group B ===
| Pos | Team | Pld | W | L | GF | GA | GD | PF | PA | PD | Qualification |
|---|---|---|---|---|---|---|---|---|---|---|---|
| 1 | Oleksandr Chyrkov (UKR) [2] | 2 | 2 | 0 | 4 | 0 | +4 | 84 | 42 | +42 | Qualification to elimination stage |
| 2 | Mustafa Tuğra Nur (TUR) | 2 | 1 | 1 | 2 | 2 | 0 | 69 | 57 | +12 | Qualification to elimination stage |
| 3 | Dimitar Pavlov (BUL) | 2 | 0 | 2 | 0 | 4 | −4 | 30 | 84 | −54 | |

Source: Group B – standings

| Date | | Score | | Game 1 | Game 2 | Game 3 |
|---|---|---|---|---|---|---|
| 15 August | Oleksandr Chyrkov (Ukraine) | 2–0 | (Turkey) Mustafa Tuğra Nur | 21–13 | 21–14 | |
| 16 August | Oleksandr Chyrkov (Ukraine) | 2–0 | (Bulgaria) Dimitar Pavlov | 21–7 | 21–8 | |
| 17 August | Mustafa Tuğra Nur (Turkey) | 2–0 | (Bulgaria) Dimitar Pavlov | 21–11 | 21–4 | |

=== Group C ===
| Pos | Team | Pld | W | L | GF | GA | GD | PF | PA | PD | Qualification |
|---|---|---|---|---|---|---|---|---|---|---|---|
| 1 | William Smith (GBR) [3/4] | 2 | 2 | 0 | 4 | 0 | +4 | 84 | 39 | +45 | Qualification to elimination stage |
| 2 | Thomas Numitor (FRA) | 2 | 1 | 1 | 2 | 3 | −1 | 85 | 95 | −10 | Qualification to elimination stage |
| 3 | Niall Jarvie (GBR) | 2 | 0 | 2 | 1 | 4 | −3 | 66 | 101 | −35 | |

Source: Group C – standings

| Date | | Score | | Game 1 | Game 2 | Game 3 |
|---|---|---|---|---|---|---|
| 15 August | William Smith (United Kingdom) | 2–0 | (France) Thomas Numitor | 21–11 | 21–15 | |
| 16 August | William Smith (United Kingdom) | 2–0 | (United Kingdom) Niall Jarvie | 21–5 | 21–8 | |
| 17 August | Thomas Numitor (France) | 2–1 | (United Kingdom) Niall Jarvie | 17–21 | 21–18 | 21–14 |

=== Group D ===
| Pos | Team | Pld | W | L | GF | GA | GD | PF | PA | PD | Qualification |
|---|---|---|---|---|---|---|---|---|---|---|---|
| 1 | Mathieu Thomas (FRA) [3/4] | 3 | 3 | 0 | 6 | 1 | +5 | 144 | 52 | +92 | Qualification to elimination stage |
| 2 | Antti Kärki (FIN) | 3 | 2 | 1 | 5 | 2 | +3 | 122 | 90 | +32 | Qualification to elimination stage |
| 3 | Alex Santamaria (ESP) | 3 | 1 | 2 | 2 | 4 | −2 | 60 | 109 | −49 | |
| 4 | Maurin Stübi (SUI) | 3 | 0 | 3 | 0 | 6 | −6 | 51 | 126 | −75 | |

Source: Group D – standings

| Date | | Score | | Game 1 | Game 2 | Game 3 |
|---|---|---|---|---|---|---|
| 15 August | Mathieu Thomas (France) | 2–0 | (Spain) Alex Santamaria | 21–5 | 21–1 | |
| 15 August | Antti Kärki (Finland) | 2–0 | (Switzerland) Maurin Stübi | 21–12 | 21–6 | |
| 16 August | Alex Santamaria (Spain) | 2–0 | (Switzerland) Maurin Stübi | 21–12 | 21–13 | |
| 16 August | Mathieu Thomas (France) | 2–1 | (Finland) Antti Kärki | 21–7 | 18–21 | 21–10 |
| 17 August | Alex Santamaria (Spain) | 0–2 | (Finland) Antti Kärki | 6–21 | 6–21 | |
| 17 August | Mathieu Thomas (France) | 2–0 | (Switzerland) Maurin Stübi | 21–6 | 21–2 | |

== Elimination stage ==
Quarter-finals
1 | Daniel Bethell (GBR) | 21 | 21
Mustafa Tuğra Nur (TUR) | 6 | 5
3/4 | William Smith (GBR) | 21 | 21
Antti Kärki (FIN) | 19 | 9
Thomas Numitor (FRA) | 11 | 7
3/4 | Mathieu Thomas (FRA) | 21 | 21
Colin Leslie (GBR) | 8 | 11
2 | Oleksandr Chyrkov (UKR) | 21 | 21

Semi-finals
1 | Daniel Bethell (GBR) | 21 | 21
3/4 | William Smith (GBR) | 7 | 11
3/4 | Mathieu Thomas (FRA) | 16 | 14
2 | Oleksandr Chyrkov (UKR) | 21 | 21

Final
1 | Daniel Bethell (GBR) | 21 | 21
2 | Oleksandr Chyrkov (UKR) | 4 | 12
