= Daniel Bethell =

English para-badminton player (born 1996)

Personal information
- Born: 28 January 1996 (age 30) Huntingdon, England

Sport
- Country: England
- Sport: Badminton

Men's singles SL3
- Highest ranking: 1 (19 July 2022)
- Current ranking: 2 (3 September 2024)
- BWF profile
Medal record
Men's para-badminton
Representing Great Britain
Paralympic Games
Silver medal – second place	2020 Tokyo	Men's singles
Silver medal – second place	2024 Paris	Men's singles
European Para Championships
Gold medal – first place	2023 Rotterdam	Men's singles SL3
Representing England
World Championships
Silver medal – second place	2019 Basel	Men's singles
Silver medal – second place	2024 Pattaya	Men's singles
Bronze medal – third place	2015 Stoke Mandeville	Men's singles
Bronze medal – third place	2015 Stoke Mandeville	Men's doubles
Bronze medal – third place	2015 Stoke Mandeville	Mixed doubles
European Championships
Gold medal – first place	2014 Murcia	Men's singles
Gold medal – first place	2016 Beek	Men's singles
Gold medal – first place	2018 Rodez	Men's singles
Silver medal – second place	2014 Murcia	Mixed doubles
Bronze medal – third place	2014 Murcia	Men's doubles
Bronze medal – third place	2016 Beek	Men's doubles
Bronze medal – third place	2018 Rodez	Men's doubles

Daniel Bethell (born 28 January 1996) is a British para-badminton player. He has a lower limb disability and played his first tournament in 2013. He won silver at the 2020 Summer Paralympics and the Paris Summer 2024 Paralympics. Bethell is currently ranked world number one in para-badminton men’s singles SL3.

== Early life and education ==
Bethell was born in Huntingdon and now lives in Wiltshire. He was born with cerebral palsy. He completed a Bachelor of Laws (LLB) in 2017 and then a Master of Laws (LLM) in International Commercial Law, both from the University of Bristol.

== Personal life ==
Bethell met Georgia Stride in 2019, became engaged in 2022, and got married on April 19, 2025, in Bath.

== Achievements ==
=== Paralympic Games ===
Men's singles SL3

Year	Venue	Opponent	Score	Result
2020	Yoyogi National Gymnasium, Tokyo, Japan	(India) Pramod Bhagat	14–21, 17–21	Silver
2024	Porte de La Chapelle Arena, Paris, France	(India) Kumar Nitesh	14–21, 21–18, 21–23	Silver

=== World Championships ===
Men's singles SL3

Year	Venue	Opponent	Score	Result
2015	Stoke Mandeville Stadium, Stoke Mandeville, England	(India) Pramod Bhagat	21–15, 15–21, 16–21	Bronze
2019	St. Jakobshalle, Basel, Switzerland	(India) Pramod Bhagat	21–6, 14–21, 5–21	Silver
2024	Pattaya Exhibition and Convention Hall, Pattaya, Thailand	(India) Pramod Bhagat	21–14, 15–21, 14–21	Silver

Men's doubles SL3–SU5

Year	Venue	Partner	Opponent	Score	Result
2015	Stoke Mandeville Stadium, Stoke Mandeville, England	(England) Bobby Griffin	(India) Anand Kumar Boregowda (India) Manoj Sarkar	8–21, 11–21	Bronze

Mixed doubles SL3–SU5

Year	Venue	Partner	Opponent	Score	Result
2015	Stoke Mandeville Stadium, Stoke Mandeville, England	(Denmark) Julie Thrane	(India) Rakesh Pandey (India) Manasi Girishchandra Joshi	21–15, 15–21, 18–21	Bronze

=== European Para Championships ===
Men's singles SL3

Year	Venue	Opponent	Score	Result
2023	Rotterdam Ahoy, Rotterdam, Netherlands	(Ukraine) Oleksandr Chyrkov	21–4, 21–12	Gold

=== European Championships ===
Men's singles SL3

Year	Venue	Opponent	Score	Result
2014	High Performance Center, Murcia, Spain	(Spain) Simón Cruz Mondejar	21–11, 21–14	Gold
2016	Sporthal de Haamen, Beek, Netherlands	(Germany) Pascal Wolter	19–21, 21–10, 21–6	Gold
2018	Amphitheatre Gymnasium, Rodez, France	(Ukraine) Oleksandr Chyrkov	21–9, 21–7	Gold

Men's doubles SL3–SU5

Year	Venue	Partner	Opponent	Score	Result
2014	High Performance Center, Murcia, Spain	(England) Bobby Griffin	(Spain) Simón Cruz Mondejar (Germany) Jan-Niklas Pott	24–22, 19–21, 15–21	Bronze
2016	Sporthal de Haamen, Beek, Netherlands	(England) Bobby Griffin	(Germany) Marcel Adam (Spain) Simón Cruz Mondejar	14–21, 21–23	Bronze
2018	Amphitheatre Gymnasium, Rodez, France	(England) Bobby Griffin	(France) Guillaume Gailly (France) Mathieu Thomas	18–21, 24–22, 16–21	Bronze

Mixed doubles SL3–SU5

Year	Venue	Partner	Opponent	Score	Result
2014 (Note: This tournament uses a round robin system.)	High Performance Center, Murcia, Spain	(Denmark) Julie Thrane	(France) Pascal Baron (France) Thiéfaine Auvert	21–4, 21–5	Silver
2014	High Performance Center, Murcia, Spain	(Denmark) Julie Thrane	(Turkey) Muammer Çankaya (Turkey) Zehra Bağlar	21–10, 21–3	Silver
2014	High Performance Center, Murcia, Spain	(Denmark) Julie Thrane	(England) Bobby Griffin (Norway) Helle Sofie Sagøy	16–21, 21–23	Silver

=== BWF Para Badminton World Circuit (5 titles, 1 runner-up) ===
The BWF Para Badminton World Circuit – Grade 2, Level 1, 2 and 3 tournaments has been sanctioned by the Badminton World Federation from 2022.

Men's singles SL3

Year	Tournament	Level	Opponent	Score	Result
2022	Spanish Para-Badminton International	Level 1	(India) Pramod Bhagat	21–9, 21–13	(gold) Winner
2022	Bahrain Para-Badminton International	Level 2	(India) Pramod Bhagat	Walkover	(silver) Runner-up
2022	Canada Para-Badminton International	Level 1	(India) Pramod Bhagat	21–14, 9–21, 21–15	(gold) Winner
2022	4 Nations Para-Badminton International	Level 1	(India) Pramod Bhagat	21–17, 21–9	(gold) Winner
2022	Thailand Para-Badminton International	Level 1	(India) Pramod Bhagat	21–13, 21–19	(gold) Winner
2023	Spanish Para-Badminton International	Level 2	(India) Pramod Bhagat	21–18, 21–8	(gold) Winner
2023	Thailand Para-Badminton International	Level 2	(India) Pramod Bhagat	18–21, 0–0 retired	(silver) Runner-up
2023	Canada Para-Badminton International	Level 1	(India) Pramod Bhagat	21–12, 21–13	(gold) Winner
2023	4 Nations Para-Badminton International	Level 1	(India) Pramod Bhagat	21–8, 21–10	(gold) Winner
2023	Dubai Para-Badminton International	Level 1	(India) Pramod Bhagat	21–17, 21–8	(gold) Winner
2024	4 Nations Para-Badminton International	Level 1	(India) Kumar Nitesh	21–11, 21–7	(gold) Winner

=== International tournaments (2011–2021) (9 titles, 7 runners-up) ===
Men's singles SL3

Year	Tournament	Opponent	Score	Result
2014	England Para Badminton Championships	(Malaysia) Liew Teak Han	21–4, 21–8	(gold) Winner
2015	Spanish Para-Badminton International	(India) Manoj Sarkar	11–21, 21–8, 23–25	(silver) Runner-up
2015	Irish Para-Badminton International	(France) Mathieu Thomas	21–11, 21–11	(gold) Winner
2017	Spanish Para-Badminton International	(Malaysia) Muhammad Huzairi Abdul Malek	21–12, 21–12	(gold) Winner
2017	Japan Para-Badminton International	(Japan) Daisuke Fujihara	21–17, 19–21, 14–21	(silver) Runner-up
2018	Spanish Para-Badminton International	(Japan) Daisuke Fujihara	21–11, 21–13	(gold) Winner
2018	Japan Para-Badminton International	(Japan) Daisuke Fujihara	21–11, 21–8	(gold) Winner
2019	Dubai Para-Badminton International	(India) Pramod Bhagat	21–15, 18–21, 13–21	(silver) Runner-up
2019	Canada Para-Badminton International	(Indonesia) Ukun Rukaendi	21–14, 21–13	(gold) Winner
2019	Irish Para-Badminton International	(India) Pramod Bhagat	17–21, 21–17, 10–21	(silver) Runner-up
2019	China Para-Badminton International	(India) Pramod Bhagat	21–19, 13–21, 14–21	(silver) Runner-up
2019	Japan Para-Badminton International	(India) Pramod Bhagat	21–16, 21–19	(gold) Winner

Men's doubles SL3–SU5

Year	Tournament	Partner	Opponent	Score	Result
2014	England Para Badminton Championships	(England) Bobby Griffin	(Malaysia) Liew Teak Han (Malaysia) Bakri Omar	14–21, 18–21	(silver) Runner-up
2015	Irish Para-Badminton International	(England) Bobby Griffin	(France) Lucas Mazur (France) Mathieu Thomas	20–22, 17–21	(silver) Runner-up
2017	Spanish Para-Badminton International	(England) Bobby Griffin	(France) Lucas Mazur (France) Mathieu Thomas	21–14, 21–16	(gold) Winner
2017	Japan Para-Badminton International	(England) Bobby Griffin	(France) Lucas Mazur (France) Mathieu Thomas	21–16, 21–16	(gold) Winner
