= Ukun Rukaendi =

Indonesian para-badminton player (born 1970)

Personal information
- Born: 15 January 1970 (age 56) Garut, West Java, Indonesia
- Height: 165 cm (5 ft 5 in)

Sport
- Country: Indonesia
- Sport: Badminton

Men's singles SL3 Men's doubles SL3–SL4
- Highest ranking: 2 (MS 1 January 2019); 1 (MD with Hary Susanto 1 January 2019)
- Current ranking: 13 (MS); 9 (MD with Hikmat Ramdani) (8 November 2022)
- BWF profile
Medal record
Men's para-badminton
Representing Indonesia
World Championships
Gold medal – first place	2017 Ulsan	Men's singles
Gold medal – first place	2017 Ulsan	Men's doubles
Gold medal – first place	2022 Tokyo	Men's doubles
Bronze medal – third place	2019 Basel	Men's singles
Bronze medal – third place	2019 Basel	Men's doubles
Asian Para Games
Gold medal – first place	2014 Incheon	Men's singles
Gold medal – first place	2014 Incheon	Men's doubles
Gold medal – first place	2018 Jakarta	Men's team
Silver medal – second place	2018 Jakarta	Men's singles
Asian Championships
Gold medal – first place	2016 Beijing	Men's doubles
ASEAN Para Games
Gold medal – first place	2011 Surakarta	Men's singles
Gold medal – first place	2011 Surakarta	Men's doubles
Gold medal – first place	2015 Singapore	Men's singles
Gold medal – first place	2015 Singapore	Men's doubles
Gold medal – first place	2017 Kuala Lumpur	Men's singles
Gold medal – first place	2017 Kuala Lumpur	Men's doubles
Gold medal – first place	2022 Surakarta	Men's singles
Gold medal – first place	2022 Surakarta	Men's team
Gold medal – first place	2023 Cambodia	Men's team
Silver medal – second place	2022 Surakarta	Men's doubles

Ukun Rukaendi (born 15 January 1970) is an Indonesian para-badminton player. He played in the men's singles SL3 event of the 2020 Summer Paralympics.

== Awards and nominations ==
Award	Year	Category	Result	Ref.
Indonesian Sport Awards	2018	Favorite Men's Team Para Athlete with 2018 Asian Para Games Men's Team Standing	Won	

== Achievements ==
=== World Championships ===
Men's singles SL3

Year	Venue	Opponent	Score	Result	Ref
2017	Dongchun Gymnasium, Ulsan, South Korea	(India) Manoj Sarkar	15–21, 21–19, 21–16	Gold	
2019	St. Jakobshalle, Basel, Switzerland	(England) Daniel Bethell	5–21, 8–21	Bronze	

Men's doubles SL3–SL4

Year	Venue	Partner	Opponent	Score	Result	Ref
2017	Dongchun Gymnasium, Ulsan, South Korea	(Indonesia) Hary Susanto	(China) Chen Xiaoyu (China) Yang Jianyuan	21–10, 21–12	Gold	
2019	St. Jakobshalle, Basel, Switzerland	(Indonesia) Hary Susanto	(India) Kumar Nitesh (India) Tarun Dhillon	21–23, 9–21	Bronze	
2022	Yoyogi National Gymnasium, Tokyo, Japan	(Indonesia) Hikmat Ramdani	(India) Pramod Bhagat (India) Manoj Sarkar	14–21, 21–18, 21–13	Gold	

=== Asian Para Games ===
Men's singles SL3

Year	Venue	Opponent	Score	Result	Ref
2014	Gyeyang Gymnasium, Incheon, South Korea	(India) Manoj Sarkar	21–14, 21–15	Gold	
2018	Istora Gelora Bung Karno, Jakarta, Indonesia	(India) Pramod Bhagat	18–21, 20–22	Silver	

Men's doubles SL3–SL4

Year	Venue	Partner	Opponent	Score	Result
2014	Gyeyang Gymnasium, Incheon, South Korea	(Indonesia) Hary Susanto	(Indonesia) Dwiyoko (Indonesia) Fredy Setiawan	21–15, 21–13	Gold

=== Asian Championships ===
Men's doubles SL3

Year	Venue	Partner	Opponent	Score	Result
2016	China Administration of Sport for Persons with Disabilities, Beijing, China	(Indonesia) Hary Susanto	(Malaysia) Muhammad Huzairi Abdul Malek (Malaysia) Bakri Omar	21–14, 21–16	Gold

=== ASEAN Para Games ===
Men's singles SL3

Year	Venue	Opponent	Score	Result
2011	Sritex Arena Sports Center, Surakarta, Indonesia	(Vietnam) Phạm Hoàng Thắng	21–9, 21–11	Gold
2015	OCBC Arena, Singapore	(Vietnam) Phạm Đức Trung	21–11, 21–15	Gold
2017	Axiata Arena, Kuala Lumpur, Malaysia	(Malaysia) Muhammad Huzairi Abdul Malek	21–15, 7–21, 21–11	Gold
2022	Edutorium Muhammadiyah University of Surakarta, Surakarta, Indonesia	(Indonesia) Maman Nurjaman	21–19, 21–10	Gold

Men's doubles SL3–SL4

Year	Venue	Partner	Opponent	Score	Result
2011 (Note: This tournament uses a round robin system.)	Sritex Arena Sports Center, Surakarta, Indonesia	(Indonesia) Iswiyanto	(Myanmar) Saw Bo Bo Ohn (Myanmar) Thein Htike Zaw	21–7, 21–3	Gold
2011	Sritex Arena Sports Center, Surakarta, Indonesia	(Indonesia) Iswiyanto	(Malaysia) Jasmi Tegol (Malaysia) Muhammad Huzairi Abdul Malek	21–7, 21–16	Gold
2011	Sritex Arena Sports Center, Surakarta, Indonesia	(Indonesia) Iswiyanto	(Thailand) Meepian Subpong (Thailand) Bunjob Wongkumker	21–8, 21–11	Gold
2011	Sritex Arena Sports Center, Surakarta, Indonesia	(Indonesia) Iswiyanto	(Vietnam) Trịnh Anh Tuấn (Vietnam) Phạm Hoàng Thắng	21–13, 21–19	Gold
2015	OCBC Arena, Singapore	(Indonesia) Hary Susanto	(Indonesia) Dwiyoko (Indonesia) Fredy Setiawan	21–7, 12–21, 21–17	Gold
2017	Axiata Arena, Kuala Lumpur, Malaysia	(Indonesia) Hary Susanto	(Indonesia) Dwiyoko (Indonesia) Fredy Setiawan	21–15, 21–16	Gold
2022	Edutorium Muhammadiyah University of Surakarta, Surakarta, Indonesia	(Indonesia) Hary Susanto	(Indonesia) Dwiyoko (Indonesia) Fredy Setiawan	14–21, 21–15, 10–21	Silver

=== BWF Para Badminton World Circuit (1 title, 2 runners-up) ===
The BWF Para Badminton World Circuit – Grade 2, Level 1, 2 and 3 tournaments has been sanctioned by the Badminton World Federation from 2022.

Men's singles SL3

Year	Tournament	Level	Opponent	Score	Result	Ref
2022	Indonesia Para-Badminton International	Level 3	(India) Jagadesh Dilli	21–15, 21–14	(gold) Winner	

Men's doubles SL3–SL4

Year	Tournament	Level	Partner	Opponent	Score	Result	Ref
2022	Dubai Para-Badminton International	Level 2	(Indonesia) Hikmat Ramdani	(Indonesia) Dwiyoko (Indonesia) Fredy Setiawan	18–21, 16–21	(silver) Runner-up	
2022	Indonesia Para-Badminton International	Level 3	(Indonesia) Hary Susanto	(Indonesia) Dwiyoko (Indonesia) Fredy Setiawan	17–21, 13–21	(silver) Runner-up	

=== International tournaments (2011–2021) (7 titles, 5 runners-up) ===
Men's singles SL3

Year	Tournament	Opponent	Score	Result	Ref
2014	Indonesia Para-Badminton International	(India) Manoj Sarkar	21–9, 21–12	(gold) Winner	
2015	Indonesia Para-Badminton International	(Japan) Daisuke Fujihara	21–12, 21–14	(gold) Winner	
2016	Indonesia Para-Badminton International	(India) Pramod Bhagat	15–21, 13–21	(silver) Runner-up	
2018	Irish Para-Badminton International	(Indonesia) Dwiyoko	21–9, 21–12	(gold) Winner	
2018	Australian Para-Badminton International	(India) Pramod Bhagat	16–21, 18–21	(silver) Runner-up	
2019	Canada Para-Badminton International	(England) Daniel Bethell	14–21, 13–21	(silver) Runner-up	

Men's doubles SL3–SL4

Year	Tournament	Partner	Opponent	Score	Result
2014	Indonesia Para-Badminton International	(Indonesia) Hary Susanto	(Indonesia) Dwiyoko (Indonesia) Fredy Setiawan	21–11, 21–11	(gold) Winner
2015	Indonesia Para-Badminton International	(Japan) Daisuke Fujihara	(Indonesia) Dwiyoko (Indonesia) Fredy Setiawan	14–21, 17–21	(silver) Runner-up
2016	Indonesia Para-Badminton International	(Indonesia) Hary Susanto	(Indonesia) Maman Nurjaman (Indonesia) Fredy Setiawan	21–11, 21–17	(gold) Winner
2018	Dubai Para-Badminton International	(Indonesia) Hary Susanto	(India) Kumar Nitesh (Indonesia) Fredy Setiawan	21–17, 21–15	(gold) Winner
2018	Irish Para-Badminton International	(Indonesia) Hary Susanto	(Indonesia) Maman Nurjaman (Indonesia) Hikmat Ramdani	21–14, 21–16	(gold) Winner
2018	Thailand Para-Badminton International	(Indonesia) Hary Susanto	(Indonesia) Dwiyoko (Indonesia) Fredy Setiawan	19–21, 23–21, 17–21	(silver) Runner-up
