= Manoj Sarkar =

Indian para-badminton player

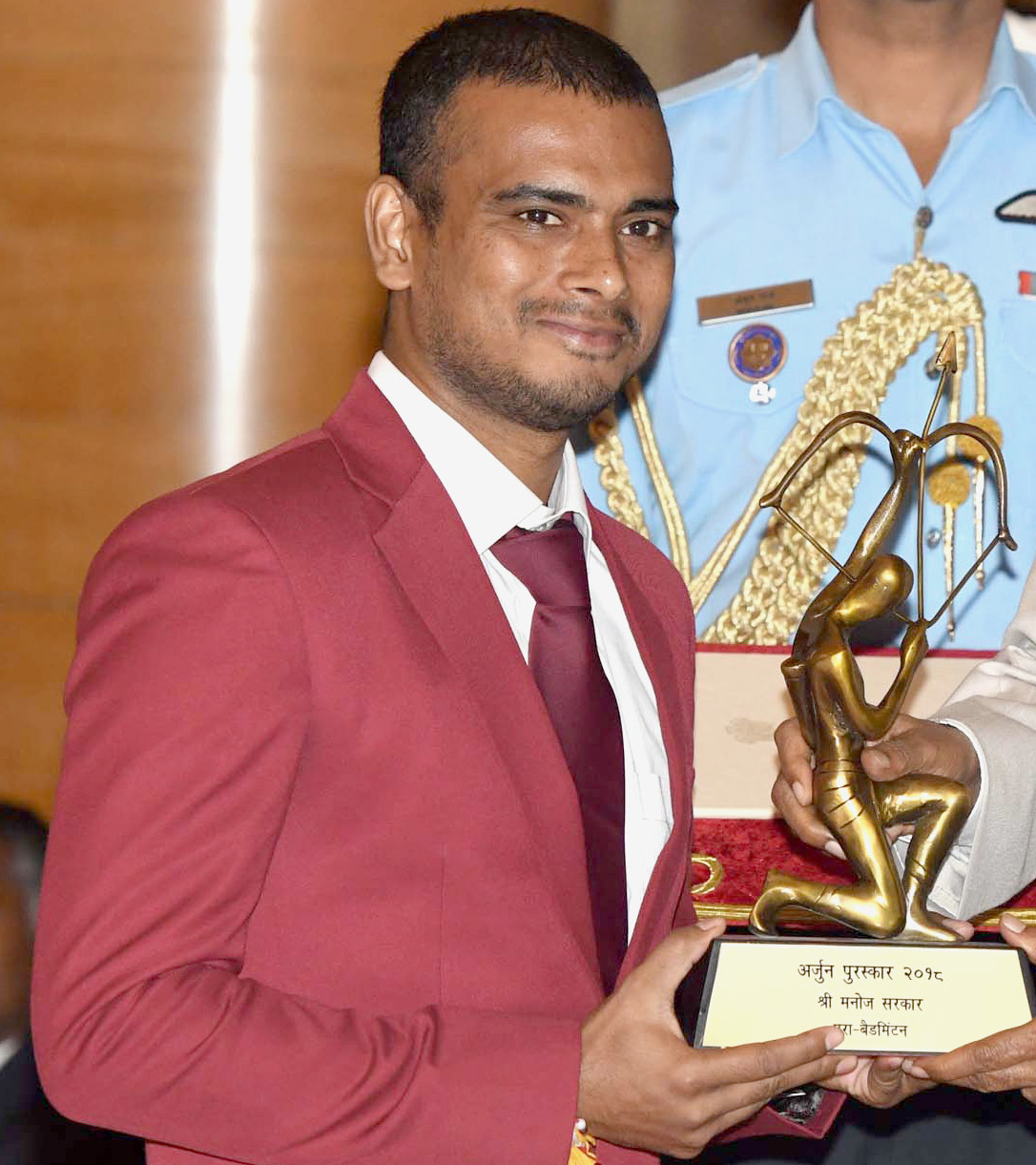
- Sarkar in 2018

Personal information
- Born: 12 January 1990 (age 36) Rudrapur, Uttarakhand, India

Sport
- Country: India
- Sport: Badminton
- Coached by: Gaurav Khanna

Men's singles SL3 Men's doubles SL3–SU5
- Highest ranking: 3 (MS 1 January 2019); 1 (MD with Pramod Bhagat 3 October 2019)
- Current ranking: 4 (MS); 2 (MD with Pramod Bhagat) (8 November 2022)
- BWF profile
Medal record
Men's para-badminton
Representing India
Paralympic Games
Bronze medal – third place	2020 Tokyo	Men's singles
World Championships
Gold medal – first place	2013 Dortmund	Men's doubles
Gold medal – first place	2015 Stoke Mandeville	Men's doubles
Gold medal – first place	2019 Basel	Men's doubles
Silver medal – second place	2017 Ulsan	Men's singles
Silver medal – second place	2022 Tokyo	Men's doubles
Bronze medal – third place	2013 Dortmund	Mixed doubles
Bronze medal – third place	2015 Stoke Mandeville	Men's singles
Bronze medal – third place	2019 Basel	Men's singles
Bronze medal – third place	2022 Tokyo	Men's singles
Bronze medal – third place	2024 Pattaya	Men's singles
Asian Para Games
Silver medal – second place	2014 Incheon	Men's singles
Bronze medal – third place	2018 Jakarta	Men's singles
Bronze medal – third place	2018 Jakarta	Men's doubles
Asian Championships
Gold medal – first place	2016 Beijing	Men's singles
Bronze medal – third place	2016 Beijing	Men's doubles

Manoj Sarkar (born 12 January 1990) is an Indian para-badminton player who lives in Rudrapur City, which is a small city in Uttarakhand, India. He has won 50 international medals in which he have 19 gold medals, 13 silver medals & 18 bronze medals. He is the only Arjun Awardee and Para Olympian Bronze medalist from Uttarakhand. He is awarded by President of India in 2018 by Arjun award. He is supported by the GoSports Foundation through the Para Champions Programme.

== Early life and background ==
Manoj's condition arose out of wrongful medical treatment at the age of one. He hails from a modest background and has two siblings. He suffers from a PPRP Lower Limb condition.

== Career ==
Manoj has won numerous accolades in the International circuit including a Men's Singles Silver at the Thailand Para-Badminton International 2017, A Gold at the Uganda Para-Badminton International 2017, a silver at the Irish Para-Badminton International 2016 and a Gold in the men's doubles event at the BWF Para-Badminton World Championships 2015. He also won a gold medal at the Turkish Para-badminton International Championship in May 2018.

== Achievements ==
=== Paralympic Games ===
Men's singles SL3

Year	Venue	Opponent	Score	Result
2020	Yoyogi National Gymnasium, Tokyo, Japan	(Japan) Daisuke Fujihara	22–20, 21–13	Bronze

=== World Championships ===
Men's singles SL3

Year	Venue	Opponent	Score	Result
2015	Stoke Mandeville Stadium, Stoke Mandeville, England	(Vietnam) Phạm Đức Trung	16–21, 11–21	Bronze
2017	Dongchun Gymnasium, Ulsan, South Korea	(Indonesia) Ukun Rukaendi	21–15, 19–21, 16–21	Silver
2019	St. Jakobshalle, Basel, Switzerland	(India) Pramod Bhagat	18–21, 16–21	Bronze
2022	Yoyogi National Gymnasium, Tokyo, Japan	(India) Kumar Nitesh	10–21, 13–21	Bronze
2024	Pattaya Exhibition and Convention Hall, Pattaya, Thailand	(India) Pramod Bhagat	21–23, 22–20, 18–21	Bronze

Men's doubles SL3–SU5

Year	Venue	Partner	Opponent	Score	Result
2013	Helmut-Körnig-Halle, Dortmund, Germany	(India) Pramod Bhagat	(Japan) Taku Hiroi (Japan) Toshiaki Suenaga	21–15, 10–21, 21–18	Gold
2015	Stoke Mandeville Stadium, Stoke Mandeville, England	(India) Anand Kumar Boregowda	(India) Pramod Bhagat (India) Tarun Dhillon	7–21, 21–14, 21–6	Gold
2019	St. Jakobshalle, Basel, Switzerland	(India) Pramod Bhagat	(India) Kumar Nitesh (India) Tarun Dhillon	14–21, 21–15, 21–16	Gold
2022	Yoyogi National Gymnasium, Tokyo, Japan	(India) Pramod Bhagat	(Indonesia) Hikmat Ramdani (Indonesia) Ukun Rukaendi	21–14, 18–21, 13–21	Silver

Mixed doubles SL3–SU5

Year	Venue	Partner	Opponent	Score	Result
2013	Helmut-Körnig-Halle, Dortmund, Germany	(India) Parul Dalsukhbhai Parmar	(Germany) Peter Schnitzler (Germany) Katrin Seibert	12–21, 21–19, 14–21	Bronze

=== Asian Para Games ===
Men's singles SL3

Year	Venue	Opponent	Score	Result
2014	Gyeyang Gymnasium, Incheon, South Korea	(Indonesia) Ukun Rukaendi	14–21, 15–21	Silver
2018	Istora Gelora Bung Karno, Jakarta, Indonesia	(Indonesia) Ukun Rukaendi	18–21, 20–22	Bronze

Men's doubles SL3–SU5

Year	Venue	Partner	Opponent	Score	Result
2018	Istora Gelora Bung Karno, Jakarta, Indonesia	(India) Pramod Bhagat	(Indonesia) Dwiyoko (Indonesia) Fredy Setiawan	13–21, 18–21	Bronze

=== Asian Championships ===
Men's singles SL3

Year	Venue	Opponent	Score	Result
2016	China Administration of Sport for Persons with Disabilities, Beijing, China	(China) Chen Xiaoyu	21–17, 21–14	Gold

Men's doubles SL3–SU5

Year	Venue	Partner	Opponent	Score	Result
2016	China Administration of Sport for Persons with Disabilities, Beijing, China	(India) Anand Kumar Boregowda	(Indonesia) Ukun Rukaendi (Indonesia) Hary Susanto	9–21, 8–21	Bronze

=== BWF Para Badminton World Circuit (3 titles, 8 runners-up) ===
The BWF Para Badminton World Circuit – Grade 2, Level 1, 2 and 3 tournaments has been sanctioned by the Badminton World Federation from 2022.

Men's singles SL3

Year	Tournament	Level	Opponent	Score	Result
2023	Western Australia Para-Badminton International	Level 2	(India) Kumar Nitesh	14–21, 14–21	(silver) Runner-up
2024	Spanish Para-Badminton International II	Level 2	(India) Kumar Nitesh	17–21, 14–21	(silver) Runner-up
2024	Bahrain Para-Badminton International	Level 2	(India) Umesh Vikram Kumar	23–21, 21–9	(gold) Winner

Men's doubles SL3–SU5

Year	Tournament	Level	Partner	Opponent	Score	Result
2022	Spanish Para-Badminton International II	Level 2	(India) Pramod Bhagat	(India) Sukant Kadam (India) Kumar Nitesh	21–19, 11–21, 21–11	(gold) Winner
2023	Canada Para-Badminton International	Level 1	(India) Deep Ranjan Bisoyee	(India) Pramod Bhagat (India) Sukant Kadam	21–14, 19–21, 21–19	(silver) Runner-up
2023	Canada Para-Badminton International	Level 1	(India) Deep Ranjan Bisoyee	(India) Nilesh Gaikwad (India) Nehal Gupta	21–11, 21–13	(silver) Runner-up
2023	Canada Para-Badminton International	Level 1	(India) Deep Ranjan Bisoyee	(France) Guillaume Gailly (Canada) William Roussy	21–9, 21–6	(silver) Runner-up
2023	Canada Para-Badminton International	Level 1	(India) Deep Ranjan Bisoyee	(India) Tarun Dhillon (India) Kumar Nitesh	9–21, 21–17, 16–21	(silver) Runner-up
2023	4 Nations Para-Badminton International	Level 1	(India) Deep Ranjan Bisoyee	(India) Pramod Bhagat (India) Sukant Kadam	17–21, 17–21	(silver) Runner-up
2023	Western Australia Para-Badminton International	Level 2	(India) Deep Ranjan Bisoyee	(India) Nehal Gupta (India) Naveen Sivakumar	21–13, 21–7	(gold) Winner
2023	Japan Para-Badminton International	Level 2	(India) Deep Ranjan Bisoyee	(India) Nehal Gupta (India) Naveen Sivakumar	19–21, 21–18, 17–21	(silver) Runner-up
2023	Dubai Para-Badminton International	Level 1	(South Korea) Cho Na-dan	(South Korea) Joo Dong-jae (South Korea) Shin Kyung-hwan	21–19, 19–21, 16–21	(silver) Runner-up
2024	Spanish Para-Badminton International II	Level 2	(India) Deep Ranjan Bisoyee	(South Korea) Joo Dong-jae (South Korea) Shin Kyung-hwan	21–10, 18–21, 16–21	(silver) Runner-up
2024	Spanish Para-Badminton International I	Level 1	(India) Deep Ranjan Bisoyee	(India) Nehal Gupta (India) Naveen Sivakumar	20–22, 24–22, 19–21	(silver) Runner-up

=== International tournaments (2011–2021) (12 titles, 10 runners-up) ===
Men's singles SL3

Year	Tournament	Opponent	Score	Result
2014	Indonesia Para-Badminton International	(Indonesia) Ukun Rukaendi	9–21, 12–21	(silver) Runner-up
2015	Spanish Para-Badminton International	(England) Daniel Bethell	21–11, 8–21, 25–23	(gold) Winner
2016	Irish Para-Badminton International	(England) Daniel Bethell	12–21, 17–21	(silver) Runner-up
2017	Thailand Para-Badminton International	(India) Pramod Bhagat	22–20, 14–21, 14–21	(silver) Runner-up
2018	Dubai Para-Badminton International	(India) Pramod Bhagat	6–3 retired	(gold) Winner
2018	Turkish Para-Badminton International	(Japan) Daisuke Fujihara	21–17, 17–21, 21–17	(gold) Winner
2018	Thailand Para-Badminton International	(India) Pramod Bhagat	18–21, 9–21	(silver) Runner-up
2019	Thailand Para-Badminton International	(India) Pramod Bhagat	11–9 retired	(gold) Winner
2019	Denmark Para-Badminton International	(Japan) Daisuke Fujihara	25–23, 14–21, 21–9	(gold) Winner
2020	Brazil Para-Badminton International	(India) Pramod Bhagat	20–22, 21–23	(silver) Runner-up
2021	Uganda Para-Badminton International	(India) Pramod Bhagat	21–19, 21–16	(gold) Winner

Men's doubles SL3–SU5

Year	Tournament	Partner	Opponent	Score	Result
2017	Thailand Para-Badminton International	(India) Pramod Bhagat	(Japan) Daisuke Fujihara (Indonesia) Fredy Setiawan	20–22, 16–21	(silver) Runner-up
2019	Uganda Para-Badminton International	(India) Pramod Bhagat	(France) Guillaume Gailly (France) Mathieu Thomas	21–13, 21–11	(gold) Winner
2019	Canada Para-Badminton International	(India) Pramod Bhagat	(Indonesia) Dwiyoko (Indonesia) Fredy Setiawan	19–21, 10–21	(silver) Runner-up
2019	Irish Para-Badminton International	(India) Pramod Bhagat	(India) Kumar Nitesh (India) Tarun Dhillon	13–21, 21–18, 23–21	(gold) Winner
2019	Thailand Para-Badminton International	(India) Pramod Bhagat	(Thailand) Mongkhon Bunsun (Thailand) Siripong Teamarrom	16–21, 21–8, 14–21	(silver) Runner-up
2019	China Para-Badminton International	(India) Pramod Bhagat	(India) Umesh Vikram Kumar (India) Suhas Lalinakere Yathiraj	18–21, 21–16, 21–15	(gold) Winner
2020	Brazil Para-Badminton International	(India) Pramod Bhagat	(China) Chen Xiaoyu (China) Gao Yuyang	21–11, 21–7	(gold) Winner
2020	Peru Para-Badminton International	(India) Pramod Bhagat	(France) Guillaume Gailly (France) Mathieu Thomas	21–19, 21–9	(gold) Winner
2021	Dubai Para-Badminton International	(India) Pramod Bhagat	(India) Sukant Kadam (India) Kumar Nitesh	21–18, 21–16	(gold) Winner
2021	Uganda Para-Badminton International	(India) Pramod Bhagat	(India) Mohammad Arwaz Ansari (India) Deep Ranjan Bisoyee	21–10, 20–22, 15–21	(silver) Runner-up

Mixed doubles SL3–SU5

Year	Tournament	Partner	Opponent	Score	Result
2015	Spanish Para-Badminton International	(India) Parul Parmar	(Germany) Jan-Niklas Pott (Germany) Katrin Seibert	13–21, 21–17, 14–21	(silver) Runner-up

== Awards ==
- Arjuna Award 25 September 2018
