= William Roussy =

Canadian para-badminton player

Personal information
- Born: 13 November 2003 (age 22) Maria, Quebec, Canada

Sport
- Sport: Badminton
- BWF profile
Medal record
Para-badminton
Representing Canada
Parapan American Games
| Silver medal – second place | 2023 Santiago | Singles SL3 |
Pan American Championships
| Gold medal – first place | 2022 Cali | Singles SL3 |
| Bronze medal – third place | 2018 Lima | Singles SL3 |
| Bronze medal – third place | 2022 Cali | Doubles SL3-SL4 |

William Roussy (born 13 November 2003) is a Canadian para-badminton player who competes in international badminton competitions. He is a Parapan American Games silver medalist and a Pan American champion in the singles.
