= Oleksandr Chyrkov =

Ukrainian para-badminton player

Personal information
- Born: 16 June 1996 (age 30)

Sport
- Country: Ukraine
- Sport: Badminton
- Handedness: Right

Men's singles SL3 Men's doubles SL3–SU5 Mixed doubles SL3–SU5
- Highest ranking: 4 (MS 15 December 2025); 7 (MD with Dilan Jacobsson 6 October 2025); 13 (XD with Ivanna Redka 28 February 2023) (19 July 2022)
- Current ranking: 4 (MS); 9 (MD with Dilan Jacobsson); 105 (XD with Ivanna Redka) (16 January 2026)
- BWF profile
Medal record
Men's para-badminton
Representing Ukraine
European Championships
Gold medal – first place	2025 Istanbul	Men's doubles
Silver medal – second place	2025 Istanbul	Men's singles
Silver medal – second place	2023 Rotterdam	Men's singles
Bronze medal – third place	2023 Rotterdam	Men's doubles
Silver medal – second place	2018 Rodez	Men's singles

Oleksandr Chyrkov (Ukrainian: Олександр Чирков; born 16 June 1996) is a Ukrainian para-badminton player that won the first and only badminton gold medal at a European Championship in the history of Ukraine. He is a two-time Paralympian and has represented Ukraine in the men's singles SL3 event at the Paralympic Games in 2020 and 2024.

Chyrkov became European Champion in October 2025 in Istanbul, Turkey with his double partner Dilan Jacobsson from Sweden. He won a silver medal at the 2025 European Championships, 2023 European Para Championships and the 2018 European Para-Badminton Championships in the men's singles SL3 event.

== Achievements ==
=== European Championships ===
Men's doubles SL3-SL4

Year	Venue	Partner	Opponent	Score	Result
2025	Istanbul, Turkey	(Sweden) Dilan Jaccobson	(Portugal) Diogo Daniel (France) Mathieu Thomas	21-9, 21-13	Gold
2023	Rotterdam Ahoy, Rotterdam, Netherlands	(Sweden) Dilan Jaccobson	(Sweden) Rickard Nilsson (United Kingdom) William Smith	17-21, 11-21	Bronze

Men's singles SL3

Year	Venue	Opponent	Score	Result
2025	Istanbul, Turkey	(United Kingdom) Daniel Bethell	9–21, 8–21	Silver
2023	Rotterdam Ahoy, Rotterdam, Netherlands	(United Kingdom) Daniel Bethell	4–21, 12–21	Silver
2018	Amphitheatre Gymnasium, Rodez, France	(United Kingdom) Daniel Bethell	9–21, 7–21	Silver

=== BWF Para Badminton World Circuit (1 runner-up) ===
The BWF Para Badminton World Circuit – Grade 2, Level 1, 2 and 3 tournaments has been sanctioned by the Badminton World Federation from 2022.

Men's singles SL3

Year	Tournament	Level	Opponent	Score	Result
2025	Spanish Para-Badminton International I	Level 1	(United Kingdom) Daniel Bethell	21–17, 13–21 21–17	Gold
2025	POLYTRON Indonesia Para Badminton International 2025	Level 1	(India) Kumar Nitesh	19–21, 12–21	Bronze
2024	Spanish Para-Badminton International I	Level 1	(India) Kumar Nitesh	11–21, 13–21	(silver) Runner-up
