= Daisuke Fujihara =

Japanese para badminton player (born 1994)

Daisuke Fujihara 藤原 大輔
Personal information
- Born: 17 February 1994 (age 32) Kōchi, Kōchi Prefecture, Japan

Sport
- Country: Japan
- Sport: Badminton

Men's singles SL3 Mixed doubles SL3–SU5
- Highest ranking: 4 (MS 6 April 2019); 4 (XD with Akiko Sugino 4 July 2022)
- Current ranking: 5 (MS); 7 (XD with Akiko Sugino) (8 November 2022)
- BWF profile
Medal record
Men's para badminton
Representing Japan
Paralympic Games
Bronze medal – third place	2020 Tokyo	Mixed doubles
World Championships
Bronze medal – third place	2011 Guatemala City	Men's singles
Bronze medal – third place	2011 Guatemala City	Men's doubles
Bronze medal – third place	2011 Guatemala City	Mixed doubles
Bronze medal – third place	2011 Guatemala City	Team
Bronze medal – third place	2022 Tokyo	Men's singles
Asian Para Games
Bronze medal – third place	2022 Hangzhou	Men's singles
Asian Championships
Bronze medal – third place	2016 Beijing	Men's singles

Daisuke Fujihara (藤原 大輔, Fujihara Daisuke; born 17 February 1994) is a Japanese para badminton player. He participated at the 2020 Summer Paralympics in the badminton competition, winning the bronze medal in the mixed doubles SL3–SU5 event with his teammate, Akiko Sugino.

== Achievements ==
=== Paralympic Games ===
Mixed doubles SL3–SU5

Year	Venue	Partner	Opponent	Score	Result
2020	Yoyogi National Gymnasium, Tokyo, Japan	(Japan) Akiko Sugino	(India) Pramod Bhagat (India) Palak Kohli	23–21, 21–19	Bronze

=== World Championships ===
Men's singles SL3

Year	Venue	Opponent	Score	Result
2011	Coliseo Deportivo, Guatemala City, Guatemala	(Spain) Simón Cruz Mondejar	21–16, 16–21, 17–21	Bronze
2022	Yoyogi National Gymnasium, Tokyo, Japan	(India) Pramod Bhagat	20–22, 14–21	Bronze

Men's doubles SL3–SU5

Year	Venue	Partner	Opponent	Score	Result
2011	Coliseo Deportivo, Guatemala City, Guatemala	(Japan) Yusuke Yamaguchi	(Chinese Taipei) Chang Yu-yung (Chinese Taipei) Huang Hsing-chih	14–21, 14–21	Bronze

Mixed doubles SL3–SU5

Year	Venue	Partner	Opponent	Score	Result
2011 (Note: This tournament uses a round robin system.)	Coliseo Deportivo, Guatemala City, Guatemala	(Japan) Aki Takahashi	(Hong Kong) Chan Cho Leung (South Korea) Heo Sun-hee	17–21, 12–21	Bronze
2011	Coliseo Deportivo, Guatemala City, Guatemala	(Japan) Aki Takahashi	(Malaysia) Loi Lang Yean (Japan) Akiko Sugino	18–21, 10–21	Bronze
2011	Coliseo Deportivo, Guatemala City, Guatemala	(Japan) Aki Takahashi	(Japan) Yusuke Yamaguchi (Japan) Yuko Yamaguchi	21–11, 21–18	Bronze

=== Asian Para Games ===
Men's singles SL3

Year	Venue	Opponent	Score	Result
2022	Binjiang Gymnasium, Hangzhou, China	(India) Kumar Nitesh	16–21, 7–21	Bronze

=== Asian Championships ===
Men's singles SL3

Year	Venue	Opponent	Score	Result
2016	China Administration of Sport for Persons with Disabilities, Beijing, China	(China) Chen Xiaoyu	14–21, 14–21	Bronze

=== BWF Para Badminton World Circuit (1 title, 2 runners-up) ===
The BWF Para Badminton World Circuit – Grade 2, Level 1, 2 and 3 tournaments has been sanctioned by the Badminton World Federation from 2022.

Men's singles SL3

Year	Tournament	Level	Opponent	Score	Result
2022	Brazil Para Badminton International	Level 2	(India) Kumar Nitesh	15–21, 21–18, 18–21	(silver) Runner-up

Mixed doubles SL3–SU5

Year	Tournament	Level	Partner	Opponent	Score	Result
2022	Brazil Para Badminton International	Level 2	(Japan) Akiko Sugino	(India) Chirag Baretha (India) Mandeep Kaur	22–20, 21–19	(gold) Winner
2022	Canada Para Badminton International	Level 1	(Japan) Akiko Sugino	(Japan) Taiyo Imai (Japan) Noriko Ito	16–21, 10–21	(silver) Runner-up

=== International tournaments (from 2011–2021) (10 titles, 11 runners-up) ===
Men's singles SL3

Year	Tournament	Opponent	Score	Result
2015	Indonesia Para Badminton International	(Indonesia) Ukun Rukaendi	12–21, 14–21	(silver) Runner-up
2016	Colombia Para Badminton International	(Cuba) Rolando Bello Rodríguez	21–10, 21–11	(gold) Winner
2017	Peru Para Badminton International	(Peru) Pedro Pablo de Vinatea	21–4, 21–14	(gold) Winner
2017	Japan Para Badminton International	(England) Daniel Bethell	17–21, 21–19, 21–14	(gold) Winner
2017	USA Para Badminton International	(South Korea) Joo Dong-jae	25–23, 16–21, 21–11	(gold) Winner
2018	Spanish Para Badminton International	(England) Daniel Bethell	11–21, 13–21	(silver) Runner-up
2018	Turkish Para Badminton International	(India) Manoj Sarkar	17–21, 21–17, 17–21	(silver) Runner-up
2018	Brazil Para Badminton International	(France) Mathieu Thomas	21–11, 21–13	(gold) Winner
2018	Japan Para Badminton International	(England) Daniel Bethell	11–21, 8–21	(silver) Runner-up
2019	Turkish Para Badminton International	(India) Pramod Bhagat	19–21, 17–21	(silver) Runner-up
2019	Denmark Para Badminton International	(India) Manoj Sarkar	23–25, 21–14, 9–21	(silver) Runner-up

Men's doubles SL3–SU5

Year	Tournament	Partner	Opponent	Score	Result
2015	Indonesia Para Badminton International	(Indonesia) Ukun Rukaendi	(Indonesia) Dwiyoko (Indonesia) Fredy Setiawan	14–21, 17–21	(silver) Runner-up
2017	Thailand Para Badminton International	(Indonesia) Fredy Setiawan	(India) Pramod Bhagat (India) Manoj Sarkar	22–20, 21–16	(gold) Winner
2017	Peru Para Badminton International	(Japan) Takahito Takeyama	(Japan) Taku Hiroi (Japan) Manabu Umeda	19–21, 21–13, 21–13	(gold) Winner
2017	USA Para Badminton International	(India) Anand Kumar Boregowda	(France) Guillaume Gailly (France) Mathieu Thomas	16–21, 12–21	(silver) Runner-up
2018	Turkish Para Badminton International	(Thailand) Siripong Teamarrom	(France) Guillaume Gailly (France) Mathieu Thomas	21–11, 16–21, 22–20	(gold) Winner
2018	Brazil Para Badminton International	(India) Sukant Kadam	(France) Guillaume Gailly (France) Mathieu Thomas	23–25, 21–16, 14–21	(silver) Runner-up
2018	Japan Para Badminton International	(Thailand) Siripong Teamarrom	(Germany) Jan-Niklas Pott (Germany) Pascal Wolter	21–14, 18–21, 21–10	(gold) Winner

Mixed doubles SL3–SU5

Year	Tournament	Partner	Opponent	Score	Result
2016 (Note: This tournament uses a round robin system.)	Colombia Para Badminton International	(Japan) Akiko Sugino	(Cuba) Rolando Bello Rodríguez (Peru) Laura Johana	21–10, 21–3	(gold) Winner
2016	Colombia Para Badminton International	(Japan) Akiko Sugino	(Brazil) Eduardo Oliveira (Brazil) Abinaecia Maria da Silva	21–7, 21–8	(gold) Winner
2016	Colombia Para Badminton International	(Japan) Akiko Sugino	(Brazil) Leonardo Zuffo (Brazil) Cintya Oliveira	21–3, 21–14	(gold) Winner
2017	Peru Para Badminton International	(Japan) Mamiko Toyoda	(Japan) Tetsuo Ura (Japan) Asami Yamada	15–21, 16–21	(silver) Runner-up
2021	Spanish Para Badminton International	(Japan) Akiko Sugino	(France) Lucas Mazur (France) Faustine Noël	12–21, 8–21	(silver) Runner-up
