= Philippines at the SEA Games =

Philippines at the Southeast Asian Games
- IOC code: PHI
- NOC: Philippine Olympic Committee
- Website: www.olympic.ph
- Medals Ranked 5th: Gold 1,180 Silver 1,346 Bronze 1,703 Total 4,229

Southeast Asian Games appearances (overview)
- 1977; 1979; 1981; 1983; 1985; 1987; 1989; 1991; 1993; 1995; 1997; 1999; 2001; 2003; 2005; 2007; 2009; 2011; 2013; 2015; 2017; 2019; 2021; 2023; 2025; 2027; 2029

The Philippines first sent athletes to the Southeast Asian Games in 1977. Prior to 1977, the Southeast Asian Games were known as the Southeast Asian Peninsular Games. The country has hosted the games four times; in 1981, 1991, 2005, and 2019. The Philippines were the overall champions of the SEA Games in 2005 and 2019, breaking their own 2005 record for the most gold medals in the latter. Excluding games they hosted, their best finish was in 1983, ranking second behind Indonesia.

The Philippines competed in the 33rd SEA Games in Bangkok & Chonburi (9–20 December 2025) with its largest ever delegation (1,168 athletes), winning multiple medals across sports.

The Philippines will host the 2033 Southeast Asian Games, fourteen years after they hosted the 2019 edition in several locations.

| Games | Year | Host city | Opened by | Date | Sports | Events | Nations | Competitors | Top-ranked team | Rank | Ref |
Southeast Asian Games
| 11 | 1981 | Manila | Ferdinand Marcos (President) | 6 December – 15 December | 18 | 242 | 7 | ≈1,800 | Indonesia (INA) | 3rd Place | |
| 16 | 1991 | Manila | Corazon Aquino (President) | 24 November – 3 December | 28 | 327 | 9 | ≈3,000 | Indonesia (INA) | 2nd Place | |
| 23 | 2005 | Manila | Gloria Macapagal Arroyo (President) | 27 November – 5 December | 40 | 443 | 11 | 5,336 | Philippines (PHI) | Champions | |
| 30 | 2019 | Philippines (Note: The 2019 SEA Games was officially decentralized. Events were held in various cities around the Philippines, mostly in the Clark City, the Metro Manila region, and the Subic Bay areas, however there was no single designated host city. The games were known as "Philippines 2019".) | Rodrigo Duterte (President) | 30 November – 11 December | 56 | 530 | 11 | 5,630 | Philippines (PHI) | Champions | |
| 37 | 2033 | TBA, Philippines | Future event | | | | | | | | |

== Southeast Asian Games ==
=== All-time medal tally ===
The country ranks 5th in the all-time Medal Tally of the Southeast Asian Games and the 4th in the region to have hit 1,000-mark in the 3 tiers of medals.

Southeast Asian Games
| Games | Athletes | Gold | Silver | Bronze | Total | Medal Rank | Rank |
|---|---|---|---|---|---|---|---|
| (Malaysia) 1977 Kuala Lumpur | 91 | 31 | 30 | 30 | 91 | – | 3 |
| (Indonesia) 1979 Jakarta | – | 24 | 31 | 38 | 93 | ↑ | 4 |
| (Philippines) 1981 Manila | – | 55 | 55 | 77 | 187 | ↑ | 3 |
| 1983 Singapore | 267 | 49 | 48 | 53 | 150 | ↓ | 2 |
| (Thailand) 1985 Bangkok | – | 43 | 54 | 32 | 129 | ↓ | 3 |
| (Indonesia) 1987 Jakarta | – | 59 | 78 | 69 | 206 | ↑ | 3 |
| (Malaysia) 1989 Kuala Lumpur | – | 26 | 37 | 64 | 127 | ↓ | 5 |
| (Philippines) 1991 Manila | 681 | 91 | 62 | 84 | 237 | ↑ | 2 |
| 1993 Singapore | 580 | 57 | 59 | 72 | 188 | ↓ | 3 |
| (Thailand) 1995 Chiang Mai | 490 | 33 | 48 | 64 | 145 | ↓ | 3 |
| (Indonesia) 1997 Jakarta | 583 | 43 | 57 | 109 | 209 | ↑ | 4 |
| (Brunei) 1999 Bandar Seri Begawan | 258 | 20 | 26 | 41 | 87 | ↓ | 5 |
| (Malaysia) 2001 Kuala Lumpur | 542 | 31 | 65 | 67 | 163 | ↑ | 5 |
| (Vietnam) 2003 Hanoi | 600 | 49 | 55 | 75 | 179 | ↑ | 4 |
| (Philippines) 2005 Manila | 892 | 112 | 84 | 94 | 290 | ↑ | 1 |
| (Thailand) 2007 Nakhon Ratchasima | 620 | 41 | 91 | 96 | 228 | ↓ | 6 |
| (Laos) 2009 Vientiane | 251 | 38 | 35 | 51 | 124 | ↓ | 5 |
| (Indonesia) 2011 Jakarta | 512 | 37 | 55 | 77 | 169 | ↑ | 6 |
| (Myanmar) 2013 Naypyidaw | 219 | 29 | 34 | 38 | 101 | ↓ | 7 |
| 2015 Singapore | 466 | 29 | 36 | 66 | 131 | ↑ | 6 |
| (Malaysia) 2017 Kuala Lumpur | 497 | 24 | 33 | 64 | 121 | ↓ | 6 |
| 2019 Philippines | 1,115 | 149 | 117 | 121 | 387 | ↑ | 1 |
| 2021 Vietnam | 656 | 52 | 70 | 105 | 227 | ↓ | 4 |
| (Cambodia) 2023 Phnom Penh | 840 | 58 | 85 | 117 | 260 | ↑ | 5 |
| 2025 Thailand | 1,168 | 50 | 73 | 154 | 277 | ↓ | 6 |
| (Malaysia) 2027 Kuala Lumpur | Future event | | | | | | |
| 2029 Singapore | Future event | | | | | | |
| 2031 Laos | Future event | | | | | | |
| 2033 Philippines | Future event | | | | | | |
| Total | | 1,180 | 1,346 | 1,703 | 4,229 | – | 5th |

- Gold
- Silver
- Bronze

== Medals by sport ==
| Sport | Rank | 1st place, gold medalist(s) | 2nd place, silver medalist(s) | 3rd place, bronze medalist(s) | Total | |
|---|---|---|---|---|---|---|
| Arnis | 1 | 23 | 9 | 6 | 38 | |
| Archery | 3 | 28 | 28 | 38 | 94 | |
| Athletics | 5 | 141 | 154 | 161 | 456 | |
| Badminton | 8 | 0 | 0 | 6 | 6 | |
| Basketball | 1 | 23 | 12 | 6 | 41 | |
| Baseball | 1 | 3 | 1 | 0 | 4 | |
| Billiards and snooker | 1 | 38 | 26 | 34 | 98 | |
| Bodybuilding | 3 | 47 | 68 | 12 | – | |
| Bowling | 4 | 12 | 17 | 29 | – | |
| Boxing | – | 38* | 32* | 37* | 97* | Boxing Record tentative due to insufficient records. |
| Chess | – | – | – | – | – | |
| Cricket | – | – | – | – | – | |
| Cycling | – | – | – | – | – | |
| Diving | – | – | – | – | – | |
| Duathlon | 1 | 1 | 1 | 1 | 3 | |
| eSports | 1 | 7 | 4 | 4 | 15 | |
| Equestrian | – | – | – | – | – | |
| Fencing | – | – | – | – | – | |
| Field hockey | – | – | – | – | – | |
| Figure skating | 3 | 0 | 3 | 1 | 4 | |
| Floorball | 3 | 0 | 1 | 1 | 2 | |
| Football | 6 | 1 | 0 | 2 | 3 | |
| Futsal | 6 | 0 | 0 | 1 | 1 | |
| Golf | – | – | – | – | – | |
| Gymnastics | – | – | – | – | – | |
| Handball | | 0 | 1 | 1 | 2 | |
| Ice hockey | 2 | 1 | 0 | 1 | 2 | |
| Indoor hockey | 2 | 1 | 0 | 1 | 2 | |
| Judo | – | – | – | – | – | |
| Karate | – | – | – | – | – | |
| Kickboxing | 2 | 3 | 2 | 1 | 6 | |
| Kurash | 3 | 1 | 2 | 5 | 8 | |
| Lawn bowls | – | 3 | 11 | 11 | 25 | |
| Modern pentathlon | 2 | 2 | 1 | 2 | 5 | |
| Muaythai | – | 8 | 17 | 13 | 38 | |
| Netball | – | – | – | – | – | |
| Obstacle racing | 1 | 10 | 5 | 1 | 16 | |
| Pencak silat | – | – | – | – | – | |
| Pétanque | – | – | – | – | – | |
| Polo | 4 | 1 | 0 | 1 | 2 | |
| Rowing | – | – | – | – | – | |
| Rugby sevens | 2 | 2 | 1 | 1 | 4 | |
| Sailing | – | – | – | – | – | |
| Sepaktakraw | – | – | – | – | – | |
| Short track speed skating | 5 | 0 | 0 | 1 | 1 | |
| Shooting | – | – | – | – | – | |
| Softball | 1 | 9 | 1 | 0 | 10 | |
| Squash | – | – | – | – | – | |
| Swimming | – | – | – | – | – | |
| Synchronised swimming | – | – | – | – | – | |
| Table tennis | 7 | 0 | 3 | 7 | 10 | |
| Taekwondo | – | – | – | – | – | |
| Tennis | 3 | 21 | 35 | 55 | 111 | |
| Triathlon | 1 | 15 | 12 | 8 | 35 | |
| Volleyball | 3 | 6 | 5 | 9 | 20 | |
| Waterskiing | – | – | – | – | – | |
| Water polo | – | – | – | – | – | |
| Weightlifting | – | – | – | – | – | |
| Wushu | 2 | 48 | 34 | 36 | 118 | Medal table was from 1997 to 2023 |
| Total | 5 | 1,180 | 1215 | 1612 | 4076 | |

== ASEAN Para Games ==
=== All-time medal tally ===
Ranking is based on total gold medals earned.

ASEAN Para Games
| Games | Athletes | Gold | Silver | Bronze | Total | Rank |
| (Malaysia) 2001 Kuala Lumpur | – | 5 | 6 | 10 | 21 | 7 |
| (Vietnam) 2003 Hanoi | – | 2 | 15 | 24 | 41 | 8 |
| (Philippines) 2005 Manila | – | 19 | 39 | 37 | 95 | 6 |
| (Thailand) 2008 Nakhon Ratchasima | – | 17 | 21 | 21 | 59 | 5 |
| (Malaysia) 2009 Kuala Lumpur | 60 | 24 | 24 | 26 | 74 | 5 |
| (Indonesia) 2011 Surabaya | 46 | 23 | 23 | 18 | 64 | 6 |
| (Myanmar) 2014 Naypyidaw | 79 | 20 | 19 | 21 | 60 | 6 |
| 2015 Singapore | 64 | 16 | 17 | 26 | 59 | 7 |
| (Malaysia) 2017 Kuala Lumpur | 115 | 20 | 20 | 29 | 69 | 5 |
| 2019 Philippines | 274 | Cancelled due to COVID-19 pandemic | | | | |
| (Indonesia) 2021 Surakarta | 144 | 28 | 31 | 46 | 105 | 5 |
| (Cambodia) 2023 Phnom Penh | 174 | 33 | 33 | 50 | 116 | 5 |
| (Thailand) 2026 Nakhon Ratchasima | 211 | 45 | 37 | 52 | 134 | 4 |
| Total | | 253 | 285 | 359 | 897 | 5th |

== ASEAN University Games ==
=== All-time medal tally ===
Ranking is based on total gold medals earned.

ASEAN University Games
| Games | Gold | Silver | Bronze | Total | Rank |
|---|---|---|---|---|---|
| (Thailand) 1981 Chiang Mai | − | − | − | − | − |
| (Indonesia) 1982 Jakarta | − | − | − | − | − |
| (Malaysia) 1984 Bangi | − | − | − | − | − |
| 1986 Singapore | − | − | − | − | − |
| (Thailand) 1988 Pattaya | − | − | − | − | − |
| (Indonesia) 1990 Bandung | − | − | − | − | − |
| (Malaysia) 1993 Shah Alam | − | − | − | − | − |
| 1994 Singapore | − | − | − | − | − |
| (Brunei) 1996 Bandar Seri Begawan | − | − | − | − | − |
| (Thailand) 1999 Bangkok | 2 | 16 | 21 | 47 | 4 |
| (Philippines) 2002 Manila | – | – | – | – | - |
| (Indonesia) 2004 Surabaya | 10 | 9 | 11 | 30 | 4 |
| (Vietnam) 2006 Hanoi | 5 | 7 | 6 | 18 | 5 |
| (Malaysia) 2008 Kuala Lumpur | 8 | 12 | 21 | 41 | 6 |
| (Thailand) 2010 Chiang Mai | 5 | 4 | 24 | 33 | 5 |
| (Laos) 2012 Vientiane | 2 | 12 | 16 | 30 | 7 |
| (Indonesia) 2014 Palembang | 10 | 11 | 21 | 42 | 5 |
| 2016 Singapore | 5 | 12 | 18 | 36 | 6 |
| (Myanmar) 2018 Naypyidaw | 1 | 0 | 0 | 1 | 10 |
| (Thailand) 2022 Ubon Ratchathani | 5 | 4 | 4 | 13 | 7 |
| (Indonesia) 2024 Surabaya-Malang | 3 | 3 | 9 | 15 | 6 |
| (Malaysia) 2026 Kuala Lumpur | Future event | | | | |
| Total | - | - | - | - | - |

== ASEAN School Games ==
=== All-time medal tally ===
Ranking is based on total gold medals earned.

ASEAN School Games
| Games | Gold | Silver | Bronze | Total | Rank |
|---|---|---|---|---|---|
| (Thailand) 2009 Suphanburi | Did not participate | | | | |
| (Malaysia) 2010 Kuala Lumpur | 0 | 2 | 3 | 5 | 6 |
| 2011 Singapore | 1 | 0 | 2 | 3 | 6 |
| (Indonesia) 2012 Surabaya | 0 | 2 | 1 | 3 | 7 |
| (Vietnam) 2013 Hanoi | 0 | 0 | 3 | 3 | 8 |
| (Philippines) 2014 Marikina | 11 | 14 | 22 | 47 | 4 |
| (Brunei) 2015 Bandar Seri Begawan | 3 | 3 | 11 | 17 | 6 |
| (Thailand) 2016 Chiang Mai | Did not participate | | | | |
| 2017 Singapore | 13 | 8 | 21 | 42 | 6 |
| (Malaysia) 2018 Kuala Lumpur | 9 | 7 | 20 | 36 | 6 |
| (Indonesia) 2019 Semarang | 4 | 7 | 22 | 33 | 6 |
| (Philippines) 2022 Dumaguete | Cancelled due to COVID-19 pandemic | | | | |
| (Vietnam) 2024 Da Nang | 2 | 8 | 20 | 30 | 6 |
| (Brunei) 2025 Bandar Seri Begawan | 11 | 10 | 23 | 43 | 4 |
| Total | 52 | 53 | 127 | 232 | 6 |

== See also ==
- Thailand at the SEA Games
- Indonesia at the SEA Games
- Vietnam at the SEA Games
- Cambodia at the SEA Games
- Timor-Leste at the SEA Games
