= Laos at the Asian Games =

- IOC code: LAO
- NOC: National Olympic Committee of Lao
- Medals Ranked 39th: Gold 0 Silver 4 Bronze 15 Total 19

Summer appearances
- 1974; 1978; 1982; 1986; 1990; 1994; 1998; 2002; 2006; 2010; 2014; 2018; 2022; 2026

Laos first competed at the Asian Games in 1974.

== Asian Games ==
=== Medals By Summer Games ===
Games	Gold	Silver	Bronze	Total
1974 Tehran	0	0	0	0
1978 Bangkok	0	0	0	0
1982 New Delhi	0	0	0	0
1990 Beijing	0	0	1	1
1994 Hiroshima	0	0	0	0
1998 Bangkok	0	0	1	1
2002 Busan	0	0	2	2
2006 Doha	0	1	0	1
2010 Guangzhou	0	0	2	2
2014 Incheon	0	1	2	3
2018 Jakarta / Palembang	0	2	3	5
2022 Hangzhou	0	0	3	3
2026 Nagoya	0	0	1	1
Totals (13 entries)	0	4	15	19

=== Medals by summer sport ===
Sport	Rank	Gold	Silver	Bronze	Total
Sepak takraw	8	0	2	4	6
Wushu	16	0	1	6	7
Pencak silat	6	0	1	2	3
Boxing	30	0	0	1	1
Karate	25	0	0	1	1
Total	39	0	4	14	18

== Asian Indoor and Martial Arts Games ==
=== Medals by Games ===
Games	Rank	Gold	Silver	Bronze	Total
Asian Indoor Games
2005 Bangkok	18	0	5	2	7
2007 Macau	26	0	0	3	3
2009 Hanoi	13	3	8	14	25
Asian Martial Arts Games
2009 Bangkok	18	1	4	9	14
Asian Indoor and Martial Arts Games
2013 Incheon	24	0	1	1	2
2017 Ashgabat	-	0	0	0	0
Total		4	18	29	51

== Asian Beach Games ==
=== Medals by Games ===
Games	Rank	Gold	Silver	Bronze	Total
2008 Bali	-	0	0	0	0
2010 Muscat	-	0	0	0	0
2012 Haiyang	18	0	0	1	1
2014 Phuket	18	2	2	8	12
2016 Danang	14	3	3	24	30
2020 Sanya	Future event				
Total	23	5	5	33	42

== Asian Youth Games ==
=== Medals by Games ===
Games	Rank	Gold	Silver	Bronze	Total
2009 Singapore	-	0	0	0	0
2013 Nanjing	-	0	0	0	0
2021 Surabaya	Future event				
Total	-	0	0	0	0

== Asian Para Games ==
=== Medals by Games ===
Games	Rank	Gold	Silver	Bronze	Total
2010 Guangzhou	-	0	0	0	0
2014 Incheon	-	0	0	0	0
2018 Jakarta	26	1	0	0	1
2022 Hangzhou	Future event				
Total		0	0	0	0

== Asian Youth Para Games ==
=== Medals by Games ===
Games	Rank	Gold	Silver	Bronze	Total
2009 Tokyo	-	0	0	0	0
2013 Kuala Lumpur	-	0	0	0	0
2017 Dubai	-	0	0	0	0
2021 Manama	Did not participate				
Total		0	0	0	

== Other Appearances ==
=== ASEAN School Games ===
==== Medals by Games ====
Games	Rank	Gold	Silver	Bronze	Total
2013 Hanoi	6	0	3	5	8
2014 Marikina	-	0	0	0	0
2015 Bandar Seri Begawan	8	0	1	2	3
2016 Chiang Mai	6	0	1	7	8
2017 Singapore	8	0	0	2	2
2018 Selangor	8	0	0	3	3
2019 Semarang	8	0	1	7	8
Total	9	0	6	26	32

=== ASEAN Para Games ===
*Red border color indicates tournament was held on home soil.

==== Medals by Games ====
Games	Rank	Gold	Silver	Bronze	Total
2001 Kuala Lumpur	-	0	0	0	0
2003 Hanoi	10	0	3	1	4
2005 Manila	10	0	2	1	3
2008 Nakhon Ratchasima	9	0	1	3	4
2009 Kuala Lumpur	10	0	1	1	2
2011 Surakarta	11	0	1	1	2
2014 Naypyidaw	10	0	3	3	6
2015 Singapore	10	0	2	3	5
2017 Kuala Lumpur	11	0	4	4	8
2020 Philippines	Cancelled due to the COVID-19 pandemic				
2022 Surakarta	11	0	2	7	9
2023 Phnom Pehn	11	0	2	9	11
Total	11	0	21	36	54

=== Afro-Asian Games ===
==== Medals by Games ====
Games	Rank	Gold	Silver	Bronze	Total
2003 Hyderabad	-	0	0	0	0
Total		0	0	0	0

=== FESPIC Games ===
==== Medals by Games ====
Games	Rank	Gold	Silver	Bronze	Total
1999 Bangkok	-	0	0	0	0
2002 Busan	29	0	0	1	1
2006 Kuala Lumpur	-	0	0	0	0
Total		0	0	1	1

=== FESPIC Youth Games ===
==== Medals by Games ====
Games	Rank	Gold	Silver	Bronze	Total
2003 Hong Kong	-	0	0	0	0
Total		0	0	0	0

== See also ==
- Laos at the Olympics
- Laos at the Paralympics
- Laos at the Southeast Asian Games
