= Philippines at the ASEAN Para Games =

- IPC code: PHI
- NPC: Paralympic Committee of the Philippines
- Medals Ranked 5th: Gold 253 Silver 285 Bronze 359 Total 897

ASEAN Para Games appearances (overview)
- 2001; 2003; 2005; 2008; 2009; 2011; 2014; 2015; 2017; 2022; 2023; 2025

The Philippines has competed at every iteration of the ASEAN Para Games which was first held in Kuala Lumpur, Malaysia.

== All-time medal tally ==
Ranking is based on total gold medals earned.

| Games | Athletes | Gold | Silver | Bronze | Total | Rank |
| (Malaysia) 2001 Kuala Lumpur | - | 5 | 6 | 10 | 21 | 7 |
| (Vietnam) 2003 Hanoi | - | 2 | 15 | 24 | 41 | 8 |
| (Philippines) 2005 Manila | - | 19 | 39 | 37 | 95 | 6 |
| (Thailand) 2008 Nakhon Ratchasima | - | 17 | 21 | 21 | 59 | 5 |
| (Malaysia) 2009 Kuala Lumpur | 60 | 24 | 24 | 26 | 74 | 5 |
| (Indonesia) 2011 Suarabaya | 46 | 23 | 23 | 18 | 64 | 5 |
| (Myanmar) 2014 Naypyidaw | 79 | 20 | 19 | 21 | 60 | 6 |
| 2015 Singapore | 64 | 16 | 17 | 26 | 59 | 7 |
| (Malaysia) 2017 Kuala Lumpur | 115 | 20 | 20 | 29 | 69 | 5 |
| 2020 Philippines | 274 | Cancelled due to COVID-19 pandemic | | | | |
| (Indonesia) 2022 Surakarta | 144 | 28 | 31 | 46 | 105 | 5 |
| (Cambodia) 2023 Phnom Penh | 176 | 34 | 33 | 49 | 115 | 5 |
| (Thailand) 2025 Nakhon Ratchasima | 211 | 45 | 37 | 52 | 134 | 4 |
| Total | | 253 | 285 | 359 | 897 | 5th |

== See also ==
- Philippines at the Paralympics
- Philippines at the Asian Para Games
