= Myanmar at the ASEAN Para Games =

- IPC code: MYA
- NPC: Myanmar Paralympic Sports Federation
- Medals Ranked 5th: Gold 181 Silver 132 Bronze 144 Total 457

ASEAN Para Games appearances (overview)
- auto

Myanmar first competed at the ASEAN Para Games in 2001.

== Medal table ==
Games	Gold	Silver	Bronze	Total	Ref
(Malaysia) Kuala Lumpur 2001	36	18	17	71	
(Vietnam) Hanoi 2003	24	12	12	48	
(Philippines) Manila 2005	29	12	4	45	
(Thailand) Nakhon Ratchasima 2008	12	11	12	35	
(Malaysia) Kuala Lumpur 2009	8	13	5	26	
(Indonesia) Surakarta 2011	11	8	12	31	
(Myanmar) Naypyidaw 2014	34	26	36	96	
Singapore 2015	16	17	29	62	
(Malaysia) Kuala Lumpur 2017	11	15	17	43	
Total	181	132	144	457	

== See also ==
- Myanmar at the Paralympics
- Myanmar at the Asian Para Games
- Myanmar at the Southeast Asian Games
