= Thailand at the SEA Games =

Thailand at the Southeast Asian Games
- IOC code: THA
- NOC: National Olympic Committee of Thailand
- Website: www.olympicthai.or.th/eng
- Medals Ranked 1st: Gold 2,686 Silver 2,281 Bronze 2,294 Total 7,261

Southeast Asian Games appearances (overview)
- 1961; 1965; 1967; 1969; 1971; 1973; 1975; 1977; 1979; 1981; 1983; 1985; 1987; 1989; 1991; 1993; 1995; 1997; 1999; 2001; 2003; 2005; 2007; 2009; 2011; 2013; 2015; 2017; 2019; 2021; 2023; 2025; 2027; 2029

Thailand started sending athletes to the Southeast Asian Games in 1959 as a founding member of the Southeast Asian Games Federation (SEAGF) alongside Burma (now Myanmar), Kampuchea (now Cambodia), Laos, Malaya (now Malaysia), and the Republic of Vietnam (South Vietnam). Thailand first competed in the Southeast Asian Peninsular Games (SEAPG) from its namesake of "Peninsular" meaning the peninsular nations of Southeast Asia would be competing in the said games. There were 8 events held as a Southeast Asian Peninsular Games, 3 of which were held in Thailand. The 1963 edition of the games that would have been hosted by Cambodia was cancelled due to domestic political situation within the nation.

In 1975, the last Southeast Asian Peninsular Games were held in Thailand before being renamed to Southeast Asian Games after expressed interest of competing from island nations in Southeast Asia such as Indonesia, the Philippines and Singapore just of the coast of Malaysia. Thailand hosted the first edition of these games with the new name in 1985, ten years after the 1975 edition.

Thailand in the Southeast Asian Games is considered to be one of the toughest competitors in numerous events, as they have established themselves as a powerhouse in the sports world in Southeast Asia. In the most-recent 2023 Southeast Asian Games in Cambodia, Thailand ranked second in the medal tally behind Vietnam. Until today, Thailand was the only country that consistently ranked in the top 3 in every edition of the Southeast Asian Games.

Thailand is set to host the 2025 Southeast Asian Games, after 18 years. The last time Thailand hosted the Games was in 2007 in Nakhon Ratchasima.

== All time medal count ==
All time medal count, Regional Sports Competition
Event	Appearances	Gold	Silver	Bronze	Total	Rank
Southeast Asian Games	33	2,686	2,281	2,294	7,261	1st
ASEAN Para Games	11	1,280	930	717	2,927	1st
ASEAN University Games	10	579	452	376	1,407	1st
ASEAN School Games	12	393	355	410	1,163	1st

== Southeast Asian Games ==
=== Medals by games ===
Games	Gold	Silver	Bronze	Total	Rank
Southeast Asian Peninsular Games
(Thailand) Bangkok 1959	35	26	16	77	1
(Myanmar) Yangon 1961	21	18	22	61	2
(Malaysia) Kuala Lumpur 1965	38	33	35	106	1
(Thailand) Bangkok 1967	77	48	40	165	1
(Myanmar) Yangon 1969	32	32	45	109	2
(Malaysia) Kuala Lumpur 1971	44	27	38	109	1
Singapore 1973	47	25	27	99	1
(Thailand) Bangkok 1975	80	45	39	164	1
Southeast Asian Games
(Malaysia) Kuala Lumpur 1977	37	35	33	105	2
(Indonesia) Jakarta 1979	50	46	29	125	2
(Philippines) Manila 1981	62	45	41	148	2
Singapore 1983	49	40	38	127	3
(Thailand) Bangkok 1985	92	66	59	217	1
(Indonesia) Jakarta 1987	63	57	67	187	2
(Malaysia) Kuala Lumpur 1989	62	63	66	191	3
(Philippines) Manila 1991	72	80	69	221	3
Singapore 1993	63	70	63	196	2
(Thailand) Chiang Mai 1995	157	98	91	346	1
(Indonesia) Jakarta 1997	83	97	78	258	2
(Brunei) Bandar Seri Begawan 1999	65	48	56	169	1
(Malaysia) Kuala Lumpur 2001	103	86	89	278	2
(Vietnam) Hanoi−Ho Chi Minh City 2003	90	93	98	281	2
(Philippines) Manila 2005	87	78	118	283	2
(Thailand) Nakhon Ratchasima 2007	183	123	103	409	1
(Laos) Vientiane 2009	86	83	97	266	1
(Indonesia) Jakarta−Palembang 2011	109	100	120	329	2
(Myanmar) Naypyidaw 2013	107	94	81	282	1
Singapore 2015	95	83	69	247	1
(Malaysia) Kuala Lumpur 2017	72	86	88	246	2
Philippines 2019	92	103	123	318	3
(Vietnam) Hanoi 2021	92	103	136	331	2
(Cambodia) Phnom Penh 2023	108	96	108	312	2
(Thailand) Bangkok–Chonburi 2025	233	154	112	499	1
Malaysia 2027	Future event				
Singapore 2029	Future event				
Total	2,686	2,281	2,294	7,261	1

== ASEAN Para Games ==
=== All-time medal tally ===
Ranking is based on total gold medals earned.

ASEAN Para Games
Games	Athletes	Gold	Silver	Bronze	Total	Rank
(Malaysia) 2001 Kuala Lumpur	-	119	65	20	204	2
(Vietnam) 2003 Hanoi	-	101	61	31	193	1
(Philippines) 2005 Manila	-	139	64	28	231	1
(Thailand) 2008 Nakhon Ratchasima	-	257	109	84	450	1
(Malaysia) 2009 Kuala Lumpur	203	157	75	57	289	1
(Indonesia) 2011 Surabaya	205	126	96	73	295	1
(Myanmar) 2014 Naypyidaw	323	96	82	70	248	2
2015 Singapore	260	95	76	79	250	1
(Malaysia) 2017 Kuala Lumpur	291	68	73	95	236	3
2019 Philippines	274	Cancelled due to COVID-19 pandemic				
(Indonesia) 2021 Surakarta	260	117	113	88	318	2
(Cambodia) 2023 Phnom Penh	304	126	110	92	328	2
(Thailand) 2026 Nakhon Ratchasima	Future event					
Total		1,280	930	717	2,927	1st

== ASEAN University Games ==
=== All-time medal tally ===
Ranking is based on total gold medals earned.

ASEAN University Games
Games	Gold	Silver	Bronze	Total	Rank
(Thailand) 1981 Chiang Mai	−	−	−	−	−
(Indonesia) 1982 Jakarta	−	−	−	−	−
(Malaysia) 1984 Bangi	−	−	−	−	−
1986 Singapore	−	−	−	−	−
(Thailand) 1988 Pattaya	−	−	−	−	−
(Indonesia) 1990 Bandung	−	−	−	−	−
(Malaysia) 1993 Shah Alam	−	−	−	−	−
1994 Singapore	−	−	−	−	−
(Brunei) 1996 Bandar Seri Begawan	−	−	−	−	−
(Thailand) 1999 Bangkok	64	33	15	112	1
(Philippines) 2002 Manila	-	-	-	-	-
(Indonesia) 2004 Surabaya	52	46	26	124	1
(Vietnam) 2006 Hanoi	-	-	-	-	-
(Malaysia) 2008 Kuala Lumpur	32	29	59	120	3
(Thailand) 2010 Chiang Mai	58	61	50	169	1
(Laos) 2012 Vientiane	45	52	56	153	3
(Indonesia) 2014 Palembang	53	34	27	114	2
2016 Singapore	51	35	34	120	1
(Myanmar) 2018 Naypyidaw	62	52	38	152	1
(Thailand) 2022 Ubon Ratchathani	109	61	42	212	1
(Indonesia) 2024 Surabaya-Malang	53	49	29	131	2
(Malaysia) 2026 Kuala Lumpur	Future event				
Total	579	452	376	1,407	1st

== ASEAN School Games ==
=== All-time medal tally ===
Ranking is based on total gold medals earned.

ASEAN School Games
Games	Gold	Silver	Bronze	Total	Rank
(Thailand) 2009 Suphanburi	72	42	40	154	1
(Malaysia) 2010 Kuala Lumpur	32	37	33	102	2
2011 Singapore	29	26	42	97	1
(Indonesia) 2012 Surabaya	38	28	47	113	1
(Vietnam) 2013 Hanoi	24	31	32	87	3
(Philippines) 2014 Marikina	35	29	36	100	2
(Brunei) 2015 Bandar Seri Begawan	13	31	26	70	3
(Thailand) 2016 Chiang Mai	56	36	33	125	1
2017 Singapore	29	26	32	87	1
(Malaysia) 2018 Kuala Lumpur	19	21	31	71	3
(Indonesia) 2019 Semarang	33	31	35	99	2
(Philippines) 2022 Dumaguete	Cancelled due to COVID-19 pandemic				
(Vietnam) 2024 Da Nang	18	17	23	58	3
(Brunei) 2025 Bandar Seri Begawan	Future event				
Total	393	355	410	1,163	1
