= Timor-Leste at the ASEAN Para Games =

- IPC code: TLS
- NPC: Comité Paralimpico Nacional de Timor-Leste
- Website: paralympic.org.in
- Medals Ranked 10th: Gold 12 Silver 5 Bronze 19 Total 36

ASEAN Para Games appearances (overview)
- 2003; 2005; 2008; 2009; 2011; 2014; 2015; 2017; 2022; 2023; 2025

Timor Leste has competed at every of the ASEAN Para Games which was second held in Hanoi, Vietnam in 2003 ASEAN Para Games.

== Medal tables ==
*Red border color indicates tournament was held on home soil.

=== Medals by Games ===
Games	Rank	Gold	Silver	Bronze	Total						
(Vietnam) 2003 Hanoi	11	0	0	1	1						
(Philippines) 2005 Manila	11	0	0	0	0						
(Thailand) 2008 Nakhon Ratchasima	11	0	0	2	2						
(Malaysia) 2009 Kuala Lumpur	Did not participate										
(Indonesia) 2011 Surakarta	10	0	2	4	6						
(Myanmar) 2014 Naypyidaw	Did not participate										
2015 Singapore	Did not participate										
(Malaysia) 2017 Kuala Lumpur	9	2	0	1	3						
2020 Philippines	Cancelled due to the COVID-19 pandemic										
(Indonesia) 2022 Surakarta	9	5	2	5	12						
(Cambodia) 2023 Phnom Penh	10	2	0	5	7						
(Thailand) 2025 Nakhon Ratchasima	8	3	1	1	5	Total	10	12	5	19	36
