= Myanmar Paralympic Sports Federation =

National Paralympic Committee of Myanmar

- မြန်မာနိုင်ငံ မသန်စွမ်းသူများ အားကစားအဖွဲ့ချုပ်
- Abbreviation: MPSF
- Formation: 1989; 37 years ago
- Founded at: Yangon
- Type: National level Paralympic Sports Federation
- Headquarters: Aung San Stadium, Yangon
- President: Major General Hla Moe
- General Secretary: Peter
- Affiliations: Myanmar Olympic Committee
- Website: www.paralympic.org/myanmar

Myanmar Paralympic Sports Federation (Burmese: မြန်မာနိုင်ငံ မသန်စွမ်းသူများ အားကစားအဖွဲ့ချုပ်) is the national level body representing Myanmar in Paralympic Games. It is a sports federation for the physically challenged under the Myanmar Olympic Committee. Unlike other countries, there is no National Paralympic Committee, only the Sports Federation, which is under the Olympic Committee. Work is underway to form a Myanmar Paralympic Committee. The Sports Federation is located at Aung San Memorial Stadium, Yangon.

== History ==
The Paralympic Sports Federation was formed in 1989 under the Ministry of Sports to enable people with disabilities to participate in sports and exercise in Myanmar.The Myanmar National Paralympic Games have been held annually since 1990. In 2014, a training camp for disabled was opened in North Dagon Township of Yangon Region.Myanmar hosted the 7th ASEAN Para Games in 2014.

== Achievements ==
Myanmar athletes with disabilities have won medals in local competitions as well as international Games such as Summer Paralympics Games, Asian Para Games and ASEAN Para Games. As of 2018, 786 Medals were awarded from International Para Games.

=== Summer Paralympics ===
Ganes	Gold	Silver	Bronze	Total
(Canada) Toronto 1976	1	1	1	3
(United States) New York 1984/ (United Kingdom) Stoke Mandeville 1984	1	2	1	4
Total	2	3	2	7

=== Asian Para Games ===
Games	Gold	Silver	Bronze	Total
FESPIC Games
(Japan) Oita 1975	3	1	0	4
(Australia) Parramatta 1977	16	15	1	32
Sha Tin 1982	4	3	4	11
(Japan) Kobe 1989	8	9	10	27
(China) Beijing 1994	4	7	14	25
(Thailand) Bangkok 1999	7	16	18	41
(South Korea) Busan 2002	4	13	4	21
(Malaysia) Kuala Lumpur 2006	6	3	6	15
Total	52	67	57	176
Asian Para Games
(China) Guangzhou 2010	0	0	1	1
(South Korea) Incheon 2014	1	0	6	7
(Indonesia) Jakarta 2018	0	4	2	6
Total	1	4	9	14

=== Asian Youth Para Games ===
	Gold	Silver	Bronze	Total
(Malaysia) Kuala Lumpur 2013	3	4	4	11
Total	3	4	4	11

=== ASEAN Para Games ===
Games	Gold	Silver	Bronze	Total
(Malaysia) Kuala Lumpur 2001	43	23	11	77
(Vietnam) Hanoi 2003	24	12	11	47
(Philippines) Manila 2005	29	13	4	46
(Thailand) Nakhon Ratchasima 2008	14	16	21	51
(Malaysia) Kuala Lumpur 2009	14	19	7	40
(Indonesia) Surakarta 2011	11	9	14	34
(Myanmar) Naypyidaw 2014	34	26	36	96
Singapore 2015	16	17	29	62
(Malaysia) Kuala Lumpur 2017	11	15	17	43
Total	196	150	150	496

== See also ==
- Myanmar at the Paralympics
