= Philippines men's national sitting volleyball team =

National sports team

Philippines
- Nickname(s): Alas Pilipinas (lit. 'Philippine Aces')
- Association: Philippine National Volleyball Federation (PNVF)
- Confederation: AVC

Uniforms
Home	Away

The Philippines men's national sitting volleyball team represents the Philippines in international sitting volleyball competitions and friendly matches.

They were to compete at the 2020 ASEAN Para Games, which was supposed to he hosted by the Philippines. The games was cancelled due to the COVID-19 pandemic.

The team was retained and were able to compete in the 2022 ASEAN Para Games in Surakarta, Indonesia. They also took part at the 2023 ASEAN Para Games in Cambodia, and the 2025 ASEAN Para Games in Thailand.

== Honors ==
=== Paralympic Games ===
Games	Place
(Canada) 1976 Toronto – (France) 2024 Paris	Did not enter/qualify

=== ASEAN Para Games ===
Year	Round	Position	Pld	W	L	SW	SL	Squad
(Malaysia) 2009 Kuala Lumpur	Did not participate							
(Indonesia) 2011 Surakarta	Did not participate							
(Myanmar) 2014 Naypyidaw	Did not participate							
(Malaysia) 2017 Kuala Lumpur	Did not participate							
2020 Philippines	Cancelled							
(Indonesia) 2022 Surakarta	Group stage	6th Place	2	0	2	0	6	No Info
2023 Cambodia	No info							
(Thailand) 2025 Nakhon Ratchasima	To be determined							

== See also ==
- Philippines at the Paralympics
- Volleyball in the Philippines
