= Theresa Goh =

Singaporean Paralympic swimmer

Theresa Goh PBM BBM
Personal information
- Full name: Theresa Goh Rui Si
- Born: 16 February 1987 (age 39) Singapore
- Height: 1.29 m (4 ft 3 in) (2002)
- Weight: 50 kg (110 lb) (2008)

Sport
- Sport: Swimming
- Strokes: Breaststroke, freestyle
- Classifications: S5/SB4
Medal record
Swimming
Representing Singapore
Paralympic Games
Bronze medal – third place	2016 Rio	100 m breaststroke
ASEAN Para Games
Gold medal – first place	2005 Manila	50 butterfly
Gold medal – first place	2005 Manila	100 m butterfly
Gold medal – first place	2005 Manila	100 m freestyle
Gold medal – first place	2008 Nakhon Ratchasima	50 m breaststroke
Gold medal – first place	2008 Nakhon Ratchasima	200 m freestyle
British Paralympic Trials
Gold medal – first place	2004 United Kingdom	200 m individual medley
Danish Open
Gold medal – first place	2007 Esbjerg	100 m breaststroke
Gold medal – first place	2007 Esbjerg	100 m butterfly
Gold medal – first place	2007 Esbjerg	100 m freestyle
Gold medal – first place	2007 Esbjerg	200 m individual medley
International German Disability Swimming Championships
Gold medal – first place	2007 Berlin	50 m breaststroke
Gold medal – first place	2007 Berlin	100 m breaststroke
Gold medal – first place	2007 Berlin	200 m breaststroke
IPC Swimming World Championships
Gold medal – first place	2006 South Africa	200 m individual medley
Gold medal – first place	2006 Kuala Lumpur	100 m freestyle
Gold medal – first place	2006 Kuala Lumpur	200 m freestyle
Telkom South African National Swimming Championships
Gold medal – first place	2006 Durban	50 m breaststroke
US Paralympics Swimming National Championships
Gold medal – first place	2006 San Antonio	200 m breaststroke
Gold medal – first place	2006 San Antonio	50 m freestyle
US Paralympics Trials
Gold medal – first place	2008 Minneapolis	100 m breaststroke
Gold medal – first place	2008 Minneapolis	50 m freestyle
Gold medal – first place	2008 Minneapolis	200 m freestyle
VISA Paralympic World Cup
Silver medal – second place	2005 Manchester	200 m breaststroke
World Wheelchair Games
Gold medal – first place	2003 Christchurch	50 m backstroke
Gold medal – first place	2003 Christchurch	100 m breaststroke
Gold medal – first place	2003 Christchurch	200 m individual medley
Shooting
Representing Singapore
ASEAN Para Games
Gold medal – first place	2025 Nakhon Ratchasima	P2 - 10m air pistol SH1
Silver medal – second place	2025 Nakhon Ratchasima	Mixed P6 - team 10M air pistol SH1

Theresa Goh Rui Si (simplified Chinese: 吴蕊思; traditional Chinese: 吳蕊思; pinyin: Wú Ruǐsī; Pe̍h-ōe-jī: Gô͘ Lúi-si; born 16 February 1987) is a Singaporean swimmer and Paralympic medalist, with a bronze at the SB4 100m breaststroke at the 2016 Summer Paralympics. She previously held world records for the SB4 50 metres and 200 metres breaststroke events.

Due to spina bifida, she does not have use of her legs. Nonetheless, she started swimming at the age of five years, and began taking part in competitions at age 12. She soon established herself as a top competitor, winning medals at, among others, the ASEAN Para Games (2001, 2003, 2005 and 2008), the Far East and South Pacific Games Federation for the Disabled (FESPIC) Games (now known as the Asian Para Games) (2002), World Wheelchair Games (2003), National Swimming Championships (2004), and International Paralympic Committee (IPC) World Swimming Championships (2006).

In March 2007, at the Danish Open in Esbjerg, Denmark, Goh took top honours in the 100 metres breaststroke, 100 metres butterfly, 100 freestyle and 200 metres individual medley. At the 4th ASEAN Para Games held in Nakhon Ratchasima (Korat), Thailand, in January 2008, Goh broke the record she set in May 2007 at the German International Disability Swimming Championships to win the gold in the 50 metres breaststroke in a world and FESPIC record time of 52.62 seconds. She achieved another gold in the 200 metres freestyle. Goh took part at the 2008 Summer Paralympics in Beijing in the 50 metres, 100 metres and 200 metres freestyle, and in the 100 metres breaststroke.

Goh competed in sport class S5 for the freestyle, SB4 for the breaststroke and SM5 for the individual medley. As of 22 August 2008, she was ranked second in the world for the 100 metres breaststroke and third for the 200 metres individual medley. Goh received the 2001 Sportsgirl Merit Award from the Singapore Disability Sports Council (SDSC) and was named Sportsgirl of the Year in 2002 and 2003. From 2004 to 2006, she was the SDSC's Sportswoman of the Year. On 27 February 2008 Goh received a special award at the SDSC's Sports Superstar Awards 2007 for outstanding achievements in swimming, and in August that year she was conferred the Pingat Bakti Masyarakat (Public Service Medal) in the National Day Awards.

At the 2016 Rio Paralympics, she snagged a Bronze medal in the SB4 50 metres breaststroke. In the same year, she was presented the Bintang Bakti Masyarakat (Public Service Star) in the National Day Awards.

She announced her retirement from sports in 2019. However, in 2024, she began training in shooting. In 2025, she competed in the World Shooting Para Sport World Cup and in 2026, she won a gold medal in the women's P2 - 10m air pistol SH1 event and a silver medal in the Mixed P6 - team 10M air pistol SH1 event with fellow Singapore shooter Daniel Chan at the 2025 ASEAN Para Games.

== Early and personal life ==
Theresa Goh was born on 16 February 1987 in Singapore, the eldest of three children of Bernard Goh, the general manager of an engineering company, and Rose, a housewife. Because she was born prematurely at seven months, her parents were worried she might not survive. They were also shocked to discover that she had spina bifida, which results in an incompletely formed spinal cord, as the condition had not been detected during her mother's pregnancy. Goh had surgery at four months to close the opening at the base of her spine where her spinal cord was protruding. Due to her condition, she does not have use of her legs and relies on a wheelchair for mobility. She is also partially hearing-impaired due to an undeveloped left ear. Regarding her disabilities, she has said: "I'm fine with it. I [wouldn't] be swimming or where I am today if I weren't disabled."

Goh, who was introduced to swimming at the age of five years, attended Tampines North Primary School and Dunman Secondary School. She embarked on a Diploma in Moving Images at Temasek Polytechnic in 2005. As of January 2008, she was studying applied psychology at Raffles College, a private educational institute in Singapore. She identifies as queer.

== Sporting career ==
Goh competes in sport class S5 for the freestyle, SB4 for the breaststroke and SM5 for the individual medley. She began swimming at 12 years, winning two gold medals at the National Swimming Championships in 1999. She soon established herself as a top competitor, achieving a run of four gold medals at the 10th Malaysian Paralympic Games and ASEAN Invitation Championships in 2000. At the 2001 ASEAN Para Games in Kuala Lumpur, she garnered six gold and two silver medals, and broke the world record in the 50 metres breaststroke. She was named Sportswoman of the Games, and also picked up the 2001 Sportsgirl Merit Award from the Singapore Disability Sports Council (SDSC). In the same year at the Australian National Junior Disabled Games, she won five gold and two silver medals, and broke four games records. She achieved three gold and one silver medal at the Far East and South Pacific Games Federation for the Disabled (FESPIC) Games (now known as the Asian Para Games) held between 26 October and 1 November 2002 in Busan, South Korea. At the 2002 Commonwealth Games in Manchester, although she did not pick up any medals she achieved games records of 51.05 seconds in the 50 metres freestyle and 1 minute 48.00 seconds in the 100 metres freestyle. In 2003, at the 2nd ASEAN Para Games in Hanoi, Goh gained three golds, breaking three games records at the same time. She also swept the golds in the 50 metres backstroke, 100 metres breaststroke, 50 metres butterfly, and the 50, 100 and 200 metres freestyle in Christchurch at the World Wheelchair Games in 2003. She was named Sportsgirl of the Year in 2002 and 2003.

At the 2004 British Paralympic Trials, she was first in the 200 metres individual medley and broke her personal best in six events. That year she also took home a stunning ten gold medals at the National Swimming Championships. In her Paralympics début at the 2004 Summer Paralympics in Athens, she finished fifth in the 100 metres freestyle. She went on to complete three record-breaking swims at the 3rd ASEAN Para Games in Manila in December 2005, breaking her own games records set at the 2003 Para Games in the 50 metres butterfly and 100 metres freestyle events, and setting a new FESPIC record in the 100 metres butterfly. In March 2006, Her World magazine named her Young Woman Achiever 2005. She competed at the International Paralympic Committee (IPC) World Swimming Championships in South Africa in December 2006, winning a gold medal in the 200 metres individual medley and being pipped to first place in the 100 metres breaststroke by Israel's Inbal Pezaro by just 0.04 seconds. She also achieved a personal best time of 3 minutes 22.66 seconds in the 200 metres freestyle.

Goh broke the SB4 50 metres breaststroke world record and took the top honours in the 100 metres breaststroke, 100 metres butterfly, 100 freestyle and 200 metres individual medley at the Danish Open in Esbjerg, Denmark, between 9 and 11 March 2007. In August, at the Paralympic Swimming Championships in Osaka, she broke competition records in the 50 metres butterfly, 100 metres backstroke and 200 metres individual medley, and took a silver in the 200 metres freestyle.

At the International Wheelchair and Amputee Sports Federation (IWAS) World Wheelchair and Amputee Games 2007 in Taipei the following month, she gained three gold, three silver and one bronze medal and attained two personal bests.

Despite not training intensively for the 4th ASEAN Para Games held in Nakhon Ratchasima (Korat), Thailand, between 20 and 26 January 2008, and regarding the competition as part of her training for the 2008 Summer Paralympics in Beijing in September, Goh broke the record she set in May 2007 at the German International Disability Swimming Championships to win the gold in the 50 metres breaststroke in a world and FESPIC record time of 52.62 seconds. She also achieved golds in the 100 metres breaststroke and 200 metres freestyle. In April, she participated in the US Paralympics Trials in Minneapolis. She took gold medals in the 100 metres breaststroke and the 50 metres and 200 metres freestyle, and achieved a FESPIC record time of 55.09 seconds in the heats of the 50 metres butterfly.

Goh's personal best times as of September 2008 were 43.55 seconds for the 50 metres freestyle, 54.99 seconds for the 50 metres butterfly, 1 minute 32.92 seconds for the 100 metres freestyle, 1 minute 58.14 seconds for the 100 metres breaststroke, and 3 minutes 14.22 seconds for the 200 metres freestyle. As of 22 August 2008, Goh held the world record for the 50 metres and 200 metres breaststroke. She was ranked second in the world for the 100 metres breaststroke, third for the 200 metres individual medley, sixth for the 100 and 200 metres freestyle, seventh for the 50 metres butterfly and eighth for the 50 metres freestyle. Her current training schedule involves two-hour sessions at the Farrer Park Swimming Complex twice a day, except on Wednesday mornings and Sundays, which works out to about 42 kilometres (26 mi) a week. She also works out in the gym three times a week.

=== 2008 Summer Paralympics ===
Goh was the flagbearer for Team Singapore at the opening ceremony of the 2008 Summer Paralympics in Beijing, and competed in the 50 metres, 100 metres and 200 metres freestyle, and in the 100 metres breaststroke. On the first day of competition, 7 September, she finished sixth in the 100 metres freestyle but achieved two personal bests in the heats (1 minute 33.20 seconds) and finals (1 minute 32.92 seconds). Two days later she narrowly missed a bronze in the 200 metres freestyle, finishing fourth with a new personal best time and national record of 3 minutes 14.22 seconds. Her split time of 1 minute 32.54 seconds was also a new national record for the 100 metres freestyle. According to her coach, former Olympian Ang Peng Siong, her best chance of a medal lay in the 100 metres breaststroke. Her personal best time for this event is 1 minute 58.14 seconds, which she achieved in May 2007 at the International German Championships in Berlin. However, on 12 September, despite leading in the first 50 m with a split time of 53.26 seconds, she eventually finished fourth in a time of 2 minutes 1.99 seconds. Nonetheless, she looked forward to the 2012 Summer Paralympics in London, saying "In another four years, another round. In Athens, I was fifth and, now, I'm fourth. The next time, hopefully, I won't be third but higher up." Unusually, in her final event, the 50 metres freestyle, she chose to use the breaststroke rather than the faster front crawl, finishing in 53.67 seconds and thus failing to qualify for the final. She said she did so to gain "mental closure" after having missed the bronze in the 100 metres breaststroke.

=== 2016 Summer Paralympics ===
In the 2016 Summer Paralympics, Goh won a bronze medal in the SB4 100m breaststroke final, with a time of 1 minute and 55.55 seconds. It was her first medal since her Paralympic debut in 2004. While qualifying for the finals, she set a new Asian record in the heats at 1 minute and 54.50 seconds.

== Career ==
As of January 2008, Goh was employed by Standard Chartered Bank as a marketing services officer while on their Programme for Elite Athletes. She hopes to continue swimming full-time and to become a swimming coach.

== Medals ==
Time (min : s)	Medal	Date	Competition
50 m backstroke (S5)
[Currently unknown]	Gold	2003	World Wheelchair Games; Christchurch, New Zealand
100 m backstroke (S5)
1:58.30 (competition record)	Gold	August 2007	Paralympic Swimming Championships; Osaka, Japan
50 m breaststroke (SB4)
0:52.62 (world and FESPIC record)	Gold	21 January 2008	4th ASEAN Para Games; Nakhon Ratchasima (Korat), Thailand
0:52.94	Gold	24–27 May 2007	21st International German Disability Swimming Championships; Berlin, Germany
0:53.90	Silver	9–11 March 2007	Danish Open; Esbjerg, Denmark
0:54.24	Gold	April 2006	Telkom South African National Swimming Championships; Durban, South Africa
100 m breaststroke (SB4)
1:55.55 (finals); 1:54.50 (heats, Asian record)	Bronze	7–18 September 2016	2016 Summer Paralympics; Rio de Janeiro, Brazil
1:58.14	Gold	24–27 May 2007	21st International German Disability Swimming Championships; Berlin, Germany
1:59.31	Silver	4 December 2006	International Paralympic Committee (IPC) World Swimming Championships; South Africa
2:01.66	Gold	April 2008	US Paralympic Trials; Minneapolis, Minnesota, United States
2:02.49	Silver	2005	VISA Paralympic World Cup; Manchester, England, United Kingdom
2:06.12	Gold	9 March 2007	Danish Open; Esbjerg, Denmark
2:08.96	Gold	April 2006	Telkom South African National Swimming Championships; Durban, South Africa
2:16.19	Bronze	18-24 October 2014	2014 Asian Para Games; Incheon, South Korea
[Currently unknown]	Gold	2003	International Stoke Mandeville Wheelchair Sports Federation (ISMWSF) World Wheelchair Games; Christchurch, New Zealand
200 m breaststroke (SB4)
4:17.38 (world and FESPIC record)	Gold	27 May 2007	21st International German Disability Swimming Championships; Berlin, Germany
4:30.67 (world record)	Gold	12 August 2006	US Paralympics Swimming National Championships; San Antonio, Texas, United States
50 m butterfly (S5)
0:56.62 (competition record)	Gold	August 2007	Paralympic Swimming Championships; Osaka, Japan
0:56.80 (competition record)	Gold	16 December 2005	3rd ASEAN Para Games; Manila, Philippines
1:00.42	Silver	9 March 2007	Danish Open; Esbjerg, Denmark
[Currently unknown]	Gold	2003	World Wheelchair Games; Christchurch, New Zealand
100 m butterfly (S5)
2:08.16	Gold	18 December 2005	3rd ASEAN Para Games; Manila, Philippines
2:10.10 (FESPIC record)	Gold	11 March 2007	Danish Open; Esbjerg, Denmark
50 m freestyle (S5)
0:44.97 (competition record)	Gold	11 August 2006	US Paralympics Swimming National Championships; San Antonio, Texas, United States
0:45.42	Gold	April 2008	US Paralympic Trials; Minneapolis, Minnesota, United States
0:46.80	Silver	18-24 October 2014	2014 Asian Para Games; Incheon, South Korea
[Currently unknown]	Gold	2003	World Wheelchair Games; Christchurch, New Zealand
100 m freestyle (S5)
1:33.62 (FESPIC record)	Gold	27 November 2006	International Paralympic Committee (IPC) World Swimming Championships; Kuala Lumpur, Malaysia
1:34.62 (competition record)	Gold	15 December 2005	3rd ASEAN Para Games; Manila, Philippines
1:36.51	Gold	9 March 2007	Danish Open; Esbjerg, Denmark
1:59.26	Bronze	April 2008	US Paralympic Trials; Minneapolis, Minnesota, United States
[Currently unknown]	Gold	2003	World Wheelchair Games; Christchurch, New Zealand
200 m freestyle (S5)
3:22.50 (FESPIC record)	Gold	28 November 2006	International Paralympic Committee (IPC) World Swimming Championships; Kuala Lumpur, Malaysia
3:24.20	Gold	22 January 2008	4th ASEAN Para Games; Nakhon Ratchasima (Korat), Thailand
3:30.11	Gold	April 2008	US Paralympic Trials; Minneapolis, Minnesota, United States
[Currently unknown]	Silver	August 2007	Paralympic Swimming Championships; Osaka, Japan
200 m individual medley (SM5)
4:01.03	Gold	August 2007	Paralympic Swimming Championships; Osaka, Japan
4:06.39	Gold	2 December 2006	International Paralympic Committee (IPC) World Swimming Championships; South Africa
4:13.66	Gold	9 March 2007	Danish Open; Esbjerg, Denmark
[Currently unknown]	Gold	2003	World Wheelchair Games; Christchurch, New Zealand
[Currently unknown]	Gold	2004	British Paralympic Trials

== Honours ==
Goh was the SDSC's Sportswoman of the Year from 2004 to 2006.

Goh was one of three people given the Youth Inspiration Award at the Stars of SHINE Award 2008 organized by the National Youth Council of Singapore and the Ministry of Community Development, Youth and Sports to recognize outstanding young people who have overcome personal difficulties and contributed to the community, and on 27 February 2008 received a special award at the SDSC's Sports Superstar Awards 2007 for outstanding achievements in swimming.

In August 2008, Goh was conferred the Pingat Bakti Masyarakat (Public Service Medal) in the National Day Awards.
