= SEA Games =

Biennial multi-sport event in Southeast Asia

- Flag of the SEA Games Federation
- Abbreviation: SEA Games
- Purpose: Multi sport event for nations on the Southeast Asian subcontinent
- Frequency: Every two years
- Inaugurated: 1959 Southeast Asian Peninsular Games in Bangkok, Thailand
- Next event: 2027 Southeast Asian Games in Kuala Lumpur, Sarawak, Penang and Johor, Malaysia
- President: Chaiyapak Siriwat
- Headquarters: Bangkok, Thailand

SEA Games
- 1959; 1961; 1965; 1967; 1969; 1971; 1973; 1975; 1977; 1979; 1981; 1983; 1985; 1987; 1989; 1991; 1993; 1995; 1997; 1999; 2001; 2003; 2005; 2007; 2009; 2011; 2013; 2015; 2017; 2019; 2021; 2023; 2025; 2027; 2029

The Southeast Asian Games, commonly known as SEA Games, is a biennial multi-sport event involving participants from the current 11 countries of Southeast Asia. The games are under the regulation of the Southeast Asian Games Federation with supervision by the International Olympic Committee and the Olympic Council of Asia.

The SEA Games is one of the five subregional Games of the Olympic Council of Asia, the others being South Asian Games, West Asian Games, East Asian Games, and Central Asian Games.

== History ==
The SEA Games owes its origins to the South East Asian Peninsular Games or SEAP Games (abbreviated as SEAPG). On 22 May 1958, delegates from the countries in Southeast Asian Peninsula attending the Asian Games in Tokyo, Japan had a meeting and agreed to establish a sports organization. The SEAP Games was conceptualized by Luang Sukhum Nayapradit, then vice-president of the Thailand Olympic Committee. The proposed rationale was that a regional sports event will help promote co-operation, understanding, and relations among countries in the Southeast Asian region.

Six countries, Burma (now Myanmar), Cambodia, Laos, Malaya (now Malaysia), Thailand and the Republic of Vietnam (South Vietnam) were the founding members. These countries agreed to hold the Games biennially in June 1959 and the SEAP Games Federation Committee was formed thereafter.

The first SEAP Games were held in Bangkok from 12 to 17 December 1959, with more than 527 athletes and officials from 6 countries; Burma (now Myanmar), Laos, Malaya, Singapore, South Vietnam and Thailand participated in 12 sports.

At the 8th SEAP Games in 1975, while South Vietnam was fallen and no longer existed, the SEAP Federation considered the inclusion of Brunei, Indonesia, and the Philippines. These countries were formally admitted in 1977, the same year when SEAP Federation changed their name to the Southeast Asian Games Federation (SEAGF), and the games were known as the Southeast Asian Games. The unified Vietnam (Socialist Republic of Vietnam) returned to the games' 15th edition in 1989. Timor-Leste, one year after gaining independence from Indonesia, was admitted at the 22nd SEA Games in 2003.

The 2009 SEA Games was the first time Laos has ever hosted a SEA Games (Laos had previously declined to host the 1965 SEAP Games citing financial difficulties). Running from 9–18 December, it has also commemorated the 50 years of the SEA Games, held in Vientiane, Laos. The 2023 SEA Games, held from 5–17 May, was the first time Cambodia has ever hosted a SEA Games (Cambodia was awarded the 1963 SEAP Games, which was cancelled due to domestic political situation).

For the 2023 SEA hosted in Phnom Penh, the organising committee implemented several first-time provisions aimed at supporting participating nations. The Government of Cambodia covered the cost of food and accommodation for all athletes and sports delegates, waiving the typical daily fee previously charged to delegations. In addition, no fees were charged for broadcast rights, and tickets were free for all spectators for both the SEA Games and ASEAN Para Games competitions.

In December 2025, the president of the Indonesian Olympic Committee, Raja Sapta Oktohari, proposed to the Southeast Asian Games Federation to broaden the scope of the event by creating a parallel event he called SEA Games Plus, which would be held in even-numbered years. He argued that introducing this would support athletes in bridging the gap between regional and international events, focus on holding more Olympic sports over regional sports, and eliminating the possibility for host nations to tamper with the SEA Games charter to maximise medal hauls. He said that the Indonesian Olympic Committee had been in talks with several National Olympic Committees outside of Southeast Asia in South Asia and Oceania to participate, such as Bhutan, Australia, New Zealand, and Fiji. This plan was confirmed and clarified by the Philippine Olympic Committee President Abraham Tolentino on 1 January 2026. The event, known as the SEA Plus Youth Games, was clarified to be a youth multi-sport tournament similar to the Youth Olympic Games for athletes aged 17 and under, and will involve all nine Southeast Asian nations, as well as one guest country from another Asian sub-region.

== Symbol ==
The Southeast Asian Games symbol was introduced during the 1959 SEAP Games in Bangkok, depicting six rings that represent the six founding members and was used until the 1997 edition in Jakarta. The number of rings increased to 10 during the 1999 edition in Brunei to reflect the inclusion of Singapore, which was admitted into the Southeast Asian Games Federation in 1961, and Brunei, Indonesia, and the Philippines, which joined the organization in 1977. The number of rings was again increased to 11 during the 2011 Games in Indonesia to reflect the federation's newest member, East Timor, which was admitted in 2003.

== Participating NOCs ==
Nation	Code	National Olympic Committee	Created	Debuted
Brunei	BRU	Brunei Darussalam National Olympic Council	1984	1977
Cambodia	CAM	National Olympic Committee of Cambodia	1983	1961
Indonesia	INA	Indonesian Olympic Committee	1946	1977
Laos	LAO	National Olympic Committee of Laos	1975	1959
Malaysia	MAS	Olympic Council of Malaysia	1953	1959
Myanmar	MYA	Myanmar Olympic Committee	1947	1959
Philippines	PHI	Philippine Olympic Committee	1911	1977
Singapore	SGP	Singapore National Olympic Council	1947	1959
Thailand	THA	National Olympic Committee of Thailand	1948	1959
Timor-Leste	TLS	National Olympic Committee of Timor Leste	2003	
Vietnam	VIE	Vietnam Olympic Committee	1952	1959 (Note: Debuted as South Vietnam, which competed from 1959–1973. North Vietnam never competed. Unified Vietnam has competed since 1989.)

=== Timelines ===
Nation	Code	as SEAP Games									as SEA Games																									Total
Nation	Code	59	61	63	65	67	69	71	73	75	77	79	81	83	85	87	89	91	93	95	97	99	01	03	05	07	09	11	13	15	17	19	21	23	25	Total
Brunei	BRU			Cancelled							•	•	•	•	•	•	•	•	•	•	•	•	•	•	•	•	•	•	•	•	•	•	•	•	•	26
Cambodia (Note: Participated as Khmer Republic (KHM) in 1971 – 1973, as People's Republic of Kampuchea (CAM) in 1983 – 1987, Never competed as Democratic Kampuchea (CAM) and State of Cambodia (CAM))	CAM		•	Cancelled	•			•	•					•	•	•				•	•	•	•	•	•	•	•	•	•	•	•	•	•	•	(Note: Originally planned to participate but withdrew after the opening ceremony.)	22
Indonesia	INA			Cancelled							•	•	•	•	•	•	•	•	•	•	•	•	•	•	•	•	•	•	•	•	•	•	•	•	•	26
Laos (Note: Participated as Kingdom of Laos (LAO) in 1959 – 1973.)	LAO	•	•	Cancelled	•	•	•	•	•								•	•	•	•	•	•	•	•	•	•	•	•	•	•	•	•	•	•	•	26
Malaysia (Note: Participated as Malaya (MAL) in 1959 – 1961.)	MAS	•	•	Cancelled	•	•	•	•	•	•	•	•	•	•	•	•	•	•	•	•	•	•	•	•	•	•	•	•	•	•	•	•	•	•	•	33
Myanmar (Note: Participated as Burma (BIR) in 1959 – 1987.)	MYA	•	•	Cancelled	•	•	•	•	•	•	•	•	•	•	•	•	•	•	•	•	•	•	•	•	•	•	•	•	•	•	•	•	•	•	•	33
Philippines	PHI			Cancelled							•	•	•	•	•	•	•	•	•	•	•	•	•	•	•	•	•	•	•	•	•	•	•	•	•	26
Singapore	SGP	•	•	Cancelled	•	•	•	•	•	•	•	•	•	•	•	•	•	•	•	•	•	•	•	•	•	•	•	•	•	•	•	•	•	•	•	33
Thailand	THA	•	•	Cancelled	•	•	•	•	•	•	•	•	•	•	•	•	•	•	•	•	•	•	•	•	•	•	•	•	•	•	•	•	•	•	•	33
Timor-Leste	TLS			Cancelled							part of Indonesia													•	•	•	•	•	•	•	•	•	•	•	•	12
Vietnam (Note: Participated as South Vietnam (VNM) in 1959 – 1973. North Vietnam never competed. Unified Vietnam has competed since 1989.)	VIE	•	•	Cancelled	•	•	•	•	•								•	•	•	•	•	•	•	•	•	•	•	•	•	•	•	•	•	•	•	26
Total		6	7	Cancelled	7	6	6	7	7	4	7	7	7	8	8	8	9	9	9	10	10	10	10	11	11	11	11	11	11	11	11	11	11	11	10	296

== Editions ==
List of SEA Games
No.	Year	Host (Note: Starting the 2019 edition, the games are branded by the host country rather than by a designated host city or cities.)	Opened by (Note: Names & offices in italics reflect an opener who was not head of state when opening the Games. If the office is partially italicized, the non-italicized portion is the office & name of the head of state being represented.)	Date	Sports	Events	Na.	Com.	Top-ranked	Ref.
SEAP Games
1	1959	Bangkok, Thailand	King Bhumibol Adulyadej	12–17 December	12	67	6	518	Thailand	
2	1961	(Myanmar) Rangoon, Burma	President Win Maung	11–16 December	13	86	7	623	Burma	
3	1965	Kuala Lumpur, Malaysia	Yang di-Pertuan Agong Ismail Nasiruddin	14–21 December	14	134	7	963	Thailand	
4	1967	Bangkok, Thailand	King Bhumibol Adulyadej	9–16 December	16	144	6	984	Thailand	
5	1969	(Myanmar) Rangoon, Burma	Prime Minister Ne Win	6–13 December	15	145	6	920	Burma	
6	1971	Kuala Lumpur, Malaysia	Yang di-Pertuan Agong Abdul Halim	6–13 December	15	156	7	957	Thailand	
7	1973	Singapore	President Benjamin Sheares	1–8 September	16	161	7	1,632	Thailand	
8	1975	Bangkok, Thailand	King Bhumibol Adulyadej	9–16 December	18	172	4	1,142	Thailand	
SEA Games
9	1977	Kuala Lumpur, Malaysia	Yang di-Pertuan Agong Yahya Petra	19–26 November	18	188	7	N/A	Indonesia	
10	1979	Jakarta, Indonesia	President Soeharto	21–30 September	18	226	7	N/A	Indonesia	
11	1981	Manila, Philippines	President Ferdinand Marcos	6–15 December	18	245	7	≈1,800	Indonesia	
12	1983	Singapore	President Devan Nair	28 May – 6 June	18	233	8	N/A	Indonesia	
13	1985	Bangkok, Thailand	King Bhumibol Adulyadej	8–17 December	18	251	8	N/A	Thailand	
14	1987	Jakarta, Indonesia	President Soeharto	9–20 September	26	372	8	N/A	Indonesia	
15	1989	Kuala Lumpur, Malaysia	Yang di-Pertuan Agong Azlan Shah	20–31 August	24	302	9	≈2,800	Indonesia	
16	1991	Manila, Philippines	President Corazon Aquino	24 November – 3 December	28	327	9	N/A	Indonesia	
17	1993	Singapore	President Wee Kim Wee	12–20 June	29	318	9	≈3,000	Indonesia	
18	1995	Chiang Mai, Thailand	Crown Prince Vajiralongkorn (Note: Representing his father, Bhumibol Adulyadej, King of Thailand.)	9–17 December	28	335	10	3,262	Thailand	
19	1997	Jakarta, Indonesia	President Soeharto	11–19 October	36	490	10	5,179	Indonesia	
20	1999	Bandar Seri Begawan, Brunei	Sultan Hassanal Bolkiah	7–15 August	21	233	10	2,365	Thailand	
21	2001	Kuala Lumpur, Malaysia	Yang di-Pertuan Agong Salahuddin	8–17 September	32	391	10	4,165	Malaysia	
22	2003	Hanoi and Ho Chi Minh City, Vietnam	Prime Minister Phan Văn Khải (Note: Representing Trần Đức Lương, President of Vietnam.)	5–13 December	32	442	11	5,000	Vietnam	
23	2005	Manila, Philippines	President Gloria Macapagal Arroyo	27 November – 5 December	40	443	11	5,336	Philippines	
24	2007	Nakhon Ratchasima, Thailand	Crown Prince Vajiralongkorn	6–15 December	43	475	11	5,282	Thailand	
25	2009	Vientiane, Laos	President Choummaly Sayasone	9–18 December	29	372	11	3,100	Thailand	
26	2011	Jakarta and Palembang, Indonesia	President Susilo Bambang Yudhoyono	11–22 November	44	545	11	5,965	Indonesia	
27	2013	Naypyidaw, Myanmar	Vice President Nyan Tun (Note: Representing Thein Sein, President of Myanmar.)	11–22 December	34	460	11	4,730	Thailand	
28	2015	Singapore	President Tony Tan	5–16 June	36	402	11	4,370	Thailand	
29	2017	Kuala Lumpur, Malaysia	Yang di-Pertuan Agong Muhammad V	19–30 August	38	404	11	4,709	Malaysia	
30	2019	Philippines (Note: The 2019 SEA Games was officially decentralized. Events were held in various cities around the Philippines, mostly in the Clark City, the Metro Manila region, and the Subic Bay areas, however there was no single designated host city. The games were known as "Philippines 2019".)	President Rodrigo Duterte	30 November – 11 December	56	530	11	5,630	Philippines	
31	2021	Vietnam (Note: The event was mainly held in Hanoi, with some sports being held in various cities across the country. Originally scheduled to be held from 21 November to 2 December 2021, the Games were postponed to May 2022 due to the COVID-19 pandemic.)	President Nguyễn Xuân Phúc	12–23 May 2022	40	523	11	5,467	Vietnam	
32	2023	Cambodia	Prime Minister Hun Sen (Note: Representing Norodom Sihamoni, King of Cambodia.)	5–17 May	37	580	11	6,210	Vietnam	
33	2025	Thailand (Note: The event was mainly held in Bangkok, with some sports being held in Chonburi, Rayong, Chiang Mai and Ratchaburi. Songkhla province was originally one of the co-host provinces but due to Cyclone Senyar's impacts and damages to the province's sport facilities, all events that were to be held there were transferred to Bangkok and Chonburi.)	King Vajiralongkorn	9–20 December	50	573	10 (Note: Originally, Cambodia was to take part, but withdrew its delegation a day after the opening ceremony due to security concerns in relation to the ongoing border conflict between Thailand and Cambodia.)	9,229	Thailand	
34	2027	Malaysia	Future event	18–29 September	43	473	Future event			
35	2029	Singapore	Future event							
36	2031	Laos	Future event							
37	2033	Philippines	Future event							

The 1963 SEAP Games were cancelled. As the designated host, Cambodia was unable to host the event due to instability in the country, along with a disagreement with the International Amateur Athletic Federation. The hosting rights for the 1965 SEAP Games were passed to Laos, but they withdrew, citing financial difficulties. In 2023, Cambodia was finally able to host the Games for the first time.

== Sports ==
The SEAGF Charter and Rules mandate the minimum number of sports to be staged, with sports falling under numerous categories. Prior to 2023, a host nation must have staged a minimum of 22 sports: the two compulsory sports from Category 1 (athletics and aquatics), in addition to a minimum of 14 sports from Category 2 (Olympic and Asian Games core sports), and a maximum of 8 sports from Category 3. Each sport would not offer more than 5% of the total medal tally, except for athletics, aquatics and shooting (the shot was elevated for this category in 2013). For each sport and event to be included, a minimum of four countries must participate in it. Sports competed in the Olympic Games and Asian Games must be given priority.

This charter was modified in 2023, with the first Games with this modification in effect was the 2025 edition. Each edition will have a minimum of 36 sports, composed as follows: the compulsory Category 1 which comprises two subcategories: 1A, which consists of aquatics and athletics, and 1B, a minimum of 10 Olympic sports from the Summer Olympic Games. Under Category 2, the host must include a minimum of 10 other sports from the Olympic Games (summer/winter), Asian Games, and Asian Indoor and Martial Arts Games or Asian Beach Games. Category 3 is now capped at a maximum of four sports.

List of SEA Games sports
Category 1		Category 2		Category 3	
1A	1B	Olympic sports	Asian Games / AIMAG / ABG sports	Traditional (Note: Traditional or regional sports that are not part of Asian Games, Asian Indoor & Martial Arts Games or Asian Beach Games.)	Other or ABG Sports (Note: Sports that previously appeared in some SEA Games editions but are not an Olympic, Asian Games, nor Asian Indoor & Martial Arts Games sport.)
Athletics; All	Archery; 1977–1997, 2001–2021, since 2025		Billiards and snooker Since 1987	Arnis; 1991, 2005, 2019, 2023	Aquathlon; 2023–2025
Diving; Since 1965	Badminton; All		Bowling; 1977–1979, 1983–2001, 2005–2007, 2011, 2015–2021, since 2025	Bokator; 2023	Baseball5; 2025
Artistic swimming 2001, 2011, 2015–2017, since 2025	Baseball; 2005–2007, 2011, 2019, 2025		Chess; 2003–2005, 2011–2013, 2019–2025	Chinlone; 2013–2017, since 2023	Bodybuilding; 1987–1993, 1997, 2003–2007, 2013, 2021
Swimming; All	Basketball; 1979–2003, 2007, since 2011		Cricket; 2017, since 2023	Muay Thai; 2005–2009, 2013, 2019–2021, since 2025	Beach handball 2019–2021
Water polo 1965–2019, since 2023	Boxing; All		Dancesport; 2005–2007, 2019–2023, 2027	Traditional boat race 1993, 1997–1999, 2003–2007, 2011–2015, 2023–2025	Contract bridge 2011
	Canoeing; 1985, 1995, 2001, 2005–2007, 2011–2015, 2019–2021, 2025		Esports; Since 2019	Kenpō; 2011–2013	Duathlon; 2007, 2021–2025
	Cycling; 1959–1979, since 1983		Finswimming; 2003, 2009–2011, 2021-2023	Kun Khmer; 2023	Floorball; 2015, 2019, 2023–2025
	Equestrian; 1983, 1995, 2001, 2005–2007, 2011–2017, since 2025		Futsal; 2007, 2011–2013, 2017, 2021, since 2025	Vovinam; 2011–2013, 2021–2023	Lawn bowls 1999, 2001, 2005, 2007, 2017–2019, 2027
	Fencing; 2003–2007, 2011, since 2015		Indoor hockey 2017–2019, since 2023		Obstacle racing 2019, 2023
	Field hockey 1971–1979, 1983, 1987–1989, 1993–2001, 2007, 2013–2017, since 2023		Ju-jitsu; 2019–2025		Paragliding; 2011, 2025 (as demonstration sport)
	Football; All		Kabaddi; Since 2025		Pétanque; Since 2001
	Golf; 1985–1997, 2001, since 2005		Kickboxing; 2019–2025		Polo; 2007, 2017–2019, since 2025
	Gymnastics; 1979–1981, 1985–1997, 2001–2007, 2011, since 2015		Kurash; 2019–2021		Shuttle cock 2007–2009
	Handball; 2005–2007, 2021, 2025		Netball; 2001, 2015–2019, since 2025		Waterskiing; 1987, 1997, 2011, 2015–2019, since 2025
	Judo; 1967–1997, since 2001		Padel; 2027		
	Karate; 1985–1991, 1995–1997, 2001–2013, since 2017		Pencak silat 1987–1989, 1993–1997, since 2001		
	Modern pentathlon 2019, 2025		Roller sports 2011		
	Rowing; 1989–1991, 1997, 2001–2007, 2011–2015, 2019–2021, 2025		Rugby union 1969, 1977–1979, 1995, 2007		
	Rugby sevens 2015–2019, since 2025		Sambo; 2019		
	Sailing; 1961, 1967–1971, 1975–1977, 1983–1997, 2001, 2005–2007, 2011–2019, since 2023		Sepak takraw 1967–1969, since 1973		
	Shooting; 1959–2021, since 2025		Soft tennis 2011, 2019, 2023		
	Skateboarding; 2019, 2025		Squash; 1991–2001, 2005–2007, 2015–2019, since 2025		
	Softball; 1981–1983, 1989, 2003–2005, 2011, 2015, 2019, 2025		Teqball; 2023 (as demonstration sport), since 2025		
	Sport climbing 2011, 2025		Wushu; 1991–1993, 1997, since 2001		
	Surfing; 2019		Xiangqi; 2021–2023		
	Table tennis All				
Taekwondo; Since 1985
Tennis; 1959–2011, since 2015
Triathlon; 2005–2007, since 2015
Volleyball; 1959–1997, since 2001
Weightlifting; 1959–1997, 2001–2013, since 2017
Wrestling; 1987, 1997, 2003–2013, since 2019
		Figure skating 2017–2019, since 2025			
Ice hockey 2017–2019, since 2025
Short track speed skating 2017–2019, since 2025

== All-time medal table ==
Corrected after balancing the data of the Olympic Council of Asia and other archived sites which had kept the previous Southeast Asian Games medal tables. Some information from the aforementioned sites are missing, incorrect and or not updated.

Last Uptdated after the 2025 SEA Games

All-time Southeast Asian Games medal table
Rank	NOC	Gold	Silver	Bronze	Total
1	Thailand	2,686	2,281	2,313	7,280
2	Indonesia	2,072	1,987	2,101	6,160
3	Malaysia^{[1]}	1,433	1,420	1,990	4,843
4	Vietnam^{[2]}	1,356	1,178	1,331	3,865
5	Philippines	1,230	1,418	1,855	4,503
6	Singapore	1,097	1,151	1,587	3,835
7	Myanmar^{[3]}	594	805	1,144	2,543
8	Cambodia^{[4]}	159	202	425	786
9	Laos	79	131	439	649
10	Brunei	18	60	175	253
11	Timor-Leste	3	10	46	59
Totals (11 entries)		10,727	10,643	13,406	34,776

- ^[1] Competed as Malaya in the inaugural games until 1961.
- ^[2] The Republic of Vietnam was dissolved in July 1976 when it merged with the Democratic Republic of Vietnam (North Vietnam) to become the Socialist Republic of Vietnam, also known as Vietnam. In the 1989 edition, a unified Vietnam rejoined the games with a new name and flag. Medals won by South Vietnam until 1975 and by Vietnam after 1989 are combined here.
- ^[3] Competed as Burma until 1987.
- ^[4] Competed as Kampuchea, and Khmer Republic.

== List of multiple Southeast Asian Games medalists ==
Various individuals have won multiple medals at the Games, including the preceding Southeast Asian Peninsular Games.

As of 2019, Singaporean swimmer Joscelin Yeo has won the most Southeast Asian Games medals with 55 (40 gold, 12 silver, 3 bronze). She reached this milestone during the 2005 Games, overtaking the previous record of 39 gold medals set by another Singaporean swimmer, Patricia Chan.

== Criticism ==
One unique characteristic of the event is that there are no official limits to the number of sports and events to be contested, and the range can be decided by the organizing host pending approval by the Southeast Asian Games Federation. This has seen as many as 50 to 56 sports for the 2025 and 2019 editions, respectively. Aside from mandatory sports, the host is free to drop or introduce other sports or events (See SEA Games sports). This leeway has resulted in hosts maximizing their medal hauls by dropping sports disadvantageous to themselves relative to their peers and the introduction of obscure sports, often at short notice, thus preventing most other nations from building credible opponents. Several nations have called for amending the charter of the games to address the issue. In 2023, the SEA Games charter was modified in an effort to make the number of sports in each edition more standardized, reducing the host's leeway to remove several sports, maximize medal hauls by introducing obscure local sports, and tamper with the competition's rules.

== See also ==
- Events of the OCA (Continental)
  - Asian Games
  - Asian Winter Games
  - Asian Youth Games
  - Asian Beach Games
  - Asian Indoor and Martial Arts Games
- Events of the OCA (Subregional)
  - Central Asian Games
  - East Asian Games (now East Asian Youth Games)
  - South Asian Games
  - West Asian Games
- Events of the APC (Continental)
  - Asian Para Games
  - Asian Youth Para Games
- Events of the APC (Subregional)
  - ASEAN Para Games
  - ASEAN University Games
  - ASEAN School Games
