= Obstacle racing at the SEA Games =

Obstacle racing

Obstacle course racing has been contested at the Southeast Asian Games since the thirtieth Southeast Asian Games in 2019. It was not held in the 2021 edition but was organized again in 2023.

== Editions ==
Games	Year	Host	Best nation
XXX	2019	Philippines	Philippines
XXXII	2023	Phnom Penh, Cambodia	Philippines

== Events ==
Event	19	23	Years
Men's 100 m	X	X	2
Men's 5 km	X		1
Women's 100 m	X	X	2
Women's 5 km	X		1
Men's team relay 300 m		X	1
Women's team relay 300 m		X	1
Mixed team relay 400 m	X		1
Mixed team assist 400 m	X		1

== Medal table ==
As of the 2023 Southeast Asian Games

Rank	Nation	Gold	Silver	Bronze	Total
1	Philippines (PHI)	10	5	1	16
2	Malaysia (MAS)	0	4	4	8
3	Indonesia (INA)	0	1	5	6
4	Cambodia (CAM)	0	0	1	1
4	Laos (LAO)	0	0	1	1
Totals (5 entries)		10	10	12	32

== Participating nations ==
Nation	19	23	Years
Brunei		X	1
Cambodia		X	1
Indonesia	X	X	2
Laos	X	X	2
Malaysia	X	X	2
Myanmar	X		1
Philippines	X	X	2
Thailand	X		1
Number of nations	6	6	
