= Arnis at the SEA Games =

Arnis events at the Southeast Asian Games was first held at the 2005 edition in Manila, Philippines.

== History ==
Arnis would first feature in the Southeast Asian Games in 1991 as a demonstration sport when the Philippines hosted the regional games. The sport would only be featured occasionally in the Southeast Asian Games when the Philippines is hosting it until 2023 when Cambodia decided to include it their games' calendar.

In 2005, Arnis was made a regular sport. The martial art would only return in 2019.

== Editions ==
Games	Year	Host	Best nation
I–XV	1959–1989	Not held	
XVI	1991 (Note: demonstration sport only)	Manila, Philippines	Philippines
XVII–XXII	1993–2003	Not held	
XXIII	2005	Manila, Philippines	Philippines; Vietnam
XXIV–XXIX	2007–2017	Not held	
XXX	2019	Philippines	Philippines
XXXI	2021	Not held	
XXXII	2023	Phnom Penh, Cambodia	Philippines

== Medal table ==
As of the 2023 Southeast Asian Games

Rank	Nation	Gold	Silver	Bronze	Total
1	Philippines (PHI)	23	9	6	38
2	Vietnam (VIE)	9	15	14	38
3	Cambodia (CAM)	3	8	23	34
4	Myanmar (MYA)	3	6	23	32
5	Timor-Leste (TLS)	0	0	3	3
Totals (5 entries)		38	38	69	145

Does not include medals from the 1991 edition, where arnis is a demonstration sport
