= ASEAN Para Games =

Biennial para-sporting event

- ASEAN Para Games first Logo
- Purpose: Multi sport event for disabled people of the nations on the Southeast Asian sub-continent
- Frequency: Every 2 years
- Inaugurated: 2001 ASEAN Para Games in Kuala Lumpur, Malaysia
- Next event: 2027 ASEAN Para Games in Malaysia
- President: Osoth Bhavilai
- Headquarters: Kuala Lumpur, Malaysia
- Website: www.aseanparasportsfed.org

The ASEAN Para Games is a biennial multi-sport event held after every Southeast Asian Games involving disabled athletes from the current 11 Southeast Asia countries. Participating athletes have a variety of disabilities ranging from spastic, cerebral palsy, mobility disabilities, visual disabilities, amputated to intellectual disabilities. The ASEAN Para Games is under the regulation of the ASEAN Para Sports Federation (APSF) with supervision by the International Paralympic Committee (IPC) and the Asian Paralympic Committee and is traditionally hosted by the country where the Southeast Asian Games took place.

== History ==
In May 2000, delegates from the countries in Southeast Asia attending the Malaysian Paralympiad in Kuala Lumpur, Malaysia had a meeting and agreed to establish a disabled sport organisation. The ASEAN Para Games was conceptualised by Zainal Abu Zarin, the founding president of the Malaysian Paralympic Council. The proposed rationale was that a regional sports event will be held after the Southeast Asian Games and help promoting friendship and solidarity among persons with disabilities in the ASEAN region and rehabilitating and integrating persons with disability into mainstream society.

Ten countries, Brunei, Myanmar, Cambodia, Indonesia, Laos, Malaysia, Philippines, Singapore, Thailand and Vietnam were the founding members. These countries agreed to hold the Games biennially on 28 April 2001 and ASEAN Para Sports Federation (APSF) was formed on 23 October 2001 with Pisal Wattanawongkiri, president of the Paralympic Committee of Thailand who proposed the games' name, being elected as its first president.

The first ASEAN Para Games was held in Kuala Lumpur from 26 to 29 October 2001 comprising more than 700 athletes and officials from Brunei, Myanmar, Cambodia, Indonesia, Laos, Malaysia, Philippines, Singapore, Thailand and Vietnam participating in 2 sports.

At the 2nd ASEAN Para Games in Vietnam, East Timor was admitted into the federation as a provisional member.

== Logo ==
ASEAN Para Games unofficial symbol (2003–2005)

The logo of the ASEAN Para Games depicts the ASEAN logo positioned in the center with the symbol of the 1994–2004 Paralympic logo on top and a victory laurel surrounding the ASEAN logo. It is used on all ASEAN Para Games edition logos since 2008. Previously, an unofficial symbol resembled the red colour version of the Southeast Asian Games Federation logo depicting the 11 red rings forming a circle which was used on the logos of the 2003 ASEAN Para Games and 2005 ASEAN Para Games. Furthermore, the 1994–2004 Paralympic logo was used on the logo of the 2001 ASEAN Para Games.

== Participating countries ==
| Nation | Code | National Paralympic Committee | Debuted |
|---|---|---|---|
| Brunei | BRU | Paralympic Council of Brunei Darussalam | 2001 |
| Cambodia | CAM | National Paralympic Committee of Cambodia | 2001 |
| Indonesia | INA | National Paralympic Committee of Indonesia | 2001 |
| Laos | LAO | Lao Paralympic Committee | 2001 |
| Malaysia | MAS | Paralympic Council of Malaysia | 2001 |
| Myanmar | MYA | Myanmar Paralympic Sports Federation | 2001 |
| Philippines | PHI | Paralympic Committee of the Philippines | 2001 |
| Singapore | SGP | Singapore National Paralympic Council | 2001 |
| Thailand | THA | Paralympic Committee of Thailand | 2001 |
| East Timor | TLS | National Paralympic Committee of Timor-Leste | 2003 |
| Vietnam | VIE | Vietnam Paralympic Association | 2001 |

== List of ASEAN Para Games ==
Seven participating countries have hosted the ASEAN Para Games. Malaysia has hosted three Para Games (2001, 2009, 2017), more than any nation. The 5th ASEAN Para Games in 2009 were to be hosted by Laos, but it begged off from hosting the games due to financial difficulty and inexperience in providing necessary support for athletes with disabilities; therefore, the games were brought back to Malaysia for the second time after eight years.

The 10th ASEAN Para Games scheduled to be hosted by the Philippines were canceled due to the COVID-19 pandemic. The edition numeral still applied despite the cancellation.

The 11th ASEAN Para Games were originally scheduled to be hosted by Vietnam, but were cancelled due to the COVID-19 pandemic, unlike the 2021 Southeast Asian Games, which were postponed to 2022. However, Indonesia would step up to host the Games, and they were held in Surakarta between 30 July to 6 August 2022.

Indonesia has hosted ASEAN Para Games twice (2011 and 2022). Vietnam (2003), Philippines (2005), Thailand (2008), Myanmar (2014), Singapore (2015) and Cambodia (2023) have hosted one Para Games. Brunei, East Timor and Laos have yet to host the ASEAN Para Games.

Host cities of ASEAN Para Games

| Edition | Year | Host country | Host city | Opened by (Note: Names & offices in italics reflect an opener who was not head of state when opening the Games. If the office is partially italicised, the non-italicised portion is the office & name of the head of state being represented.) | Date | Sports | Events | Nations | Competitors | Top-ranked team |
|---|---|---|---|---|---|---|---|---|---|---|
| 1 | 2001 | Malaysia | Kuala Lumpur | King Mizan Zainal Abidin (Note: Representing Sultan Salahuddin Abdul Aziz Shah, King of Malaysia.) | 26–29 October | 2 | 341 | 10 | ≈600 | Malaysia (MAS) |
| 2 | 2003 | Vietnam | Hanoi | Prime Minister Phạm Gia Khiêm (Note: Representing Trần Đức Lương, President of Vietnam.) | 21–27 December | 5 | 287 | 11^{1} | ≈800 | Thailand (THA) |
| 3 | 2005 | Philippines | Manila | Mayor Lito Atienza (Note: Representing Gloria Macapagal Arroyo, President of Philippines.) | 14–20 December | 10 | 394 | 11 | ≈1,000 | Thailand (THA) |
| 4 | 2008 | Thailand | Nakhon Ratchasima | Prime Minister Surayud Chulanont (Note: Representing Bhumibol Adulyadej, King of Thailand.) | 20–26 January | 14 | 488 | 11 | ≈1,000 | Thailand (THA) |
| 5 | 2009 | Malaysia | Kuala Lumpur^{2} | Prime Minister Abdullah Ahmad Badawi (Note: Representing Sultan Mizan Zainal Abidin, King of Malaysia.) | 15–19 August | 11 | 409 | 10 | ≈1,000 | Thailand (THA) |
| 6 | 2011 | Indonesia | Surakarta | Vice President Boediono (Note: Representing Susilo Bambang Yudhoyono, President of Indonesia.) | 15–20 December | 11 | 380 | 11 | ≈1,000 | Thailand (THA) |
| 7 | 2014 | Myanmar | Naypyidaw | Vice President Sai Mauk Kham (Note: Representing Thein Sein, President of Myanmar.) | 14–20 January | 12 | 359 | 10 | 1,482 | Indonesia (INA) |
| 8 | 2015 | Singapore | | President Tony Tan | 3–9 December | 15 | 336 | 10 | 1,181 | Thailand (THA) |
| 9 | 2017 | Malaysia | Kuala Lumpur | Prime Minister Najib Razak (Note: Representing Sultan Muhammad V, King of Malaysia.) | 17–23 September | 16 | 369 | 11 | 1,452 | Indonesia (INA) |
| 10 | 2020 | Philippines | Various | Cancelled due to the COVID-19 pandemic | | | | | | |
| 11 | 2022 | Indonesia | Surakarta^{3} | Vice President Ma'ruf Amin (Note: Representing Joko Widodo, President of Indonesia.) | 30 July–6 August | 14 | 455 | 11 | 1,248 | Indonesia (INA) |
| 12 | 2023 | Cambodia | Phnom Penh | Prime Minister Hun Sen (Note: Representing Norodom Sihamoni, King of Cambodia.) | 3–9 June | 14 | 439 | 11 | 1,453 | Indonesia (INA) |
| 13 | 2025 | Thailand | Nakhon Ratchasima | Prince Chalermsuk Yugala (Note: Representing Vajiralongkorn, King of Thailand) | 20-26 January | 19 | 536 | 10 (Note: Cambodia withdrew from the Games due to unforeseen circumstances) | 1,606 | Thailand (THA) |
| 14 | 2027 | Malaysia | | Future event | | | | | | |
| 15 | 2029 | Singapore | | Future event | | | | | | |
| 16 | 2031 | Philippines | | Future event | | | | | | |

- ^1 East Timor was formally included in the Games, increasing its member countries to eleven.
- ^2 Originally planned to be held in Laos.
- ^3 Originally planned to be held in Hanoi, Vietnam.

== List of sports ==
Nineteen different sports have been part of the ASEAN Para Games in one point or another. Sixteen of which comprised the schedule of the recent 2017 ASEAN Para Games in Kuala Lumpur. The games saw the return of sailing as a full medal sport once again after its debut at the 2009 ASEAN Games in Kuala Lumpur.

Core sports
- Athletics (since 2001)
- Powerlifting (since 2003)
- Judo (2005-2008, since 2022)
- Chess (since 2005)

Target sports

- Archery (2008-2017, 2022, 2025)
- Cycling (2017, 2025)
- Target shooting (2008, 2015, 2025)
- Wheelchair fencing (2008, 2025)

Water sports

- Sailing (2009, 2015)
- Swimming (since 2001)
Ball and Racquet sports
- Badminton (2003-2011, since 2015)
- Boccia (2008-2014, since 2015)
- Ten-pin bowling (2009-2011, 2015-2017)
- Five-a-side football (2014-2017, 2023)
- CP football (since 2014)
- Goalball (since 2005)
- Table tennis (since 2003)
- Wheelchair basketball (2005-2009, since 2015)
- Wheelchair tennis (2005-2017, 2022, 2025)
- Sitting volleyball (2009-2014, since 2017)

Other sports

- Esports (2025)

- Boccia, ten-pin bowling, sailing and wheelchair fencing were demonstrated at the 2005 ASEAN Para Games.
- Esports were demonstrated at the 2023 ASEAN Para Games.

== All-time medal table ==
The table below accounts for the total number of medals awarded to all participating National Paralympic Committees (NPCs) of ASEAN member countries as of the recent 2025 ASEAN Para Games.

| Rank | NPC | Gold | Silver | Bronze | Total |
|---|---|---|---|---|---|
| 1 | Thailand | 1,445 | 1,085 | 873 | 3,403 |
| 2 | Indonesia | 996 | 853 | 648 | 2,497 |
| 3 | Malaysia | 805 | 701 | 608 | 2,114 |
| 4 | Vietnam | 672 | 640 | 646 | 1,958 |
| 5 | Philippines | 253 | 285 | 359 | 897 |
| 6 | Myanmar | 230 | 186 | 200 | 616 |
| 7 | Singapore | 143 | 125 | 132 | 400 |
| 8 | Brunei | 42 | 44 | 69 | 155 |
| 9 | Cambodia | 23 | 56 | 79 | 158 |
| 10 | Timor-Leste | 12 | 5 | 19 | 36 |
| 11 | Laos | 2 | 26 | 42 | 70 |
| Totals (11 entries) | | 4,623 | 4,006 | 3,675 | 12,304 |

== See also ==
- Events of the OCA (Continental)
  - Asian Games
  - Asian Winter Games
  - Asian Youth Games
  - Asian Beach Games
  - Asian Indoor and Martial Arts Games
- Events of the OCA (Regional)
  - East Asian Games
  - Central Asian Games
  - South Asian Games
  - West Asian Games
  - Southeast Asian Games
- Events of the APC (Continental)
  - Asian Para Games
  - Asian Youth Para Games
- Events of the APC (Regional)
  - ASEAN Para Games
