= 2020 ASEAN Para Games =

10th ASEAN Para Games

X ASEAN Para Games
- Host city: Various (See below)
- Motto: We Win As One
- Nations: 11
- Athletes: 2,000 (projected)
- Events: 500 in 16 sports
- Opening: 3 October 2020 (canceled)
- Closing: 9 October 2020 (canceled)
- Main venue: Philippine Arena (opening ceremony); New Clark City Athletic Stadium (closing ceremony)
- Website: 2020 ASEAN Para Games

The 2020 ASEAN Para Games, officially known as the 10th ASEAN Para Games, is a cancelled biannual multi-sport event for athletes with physical disabilities which was intended to be held after the 2019 Southeast Asian Games in the Philippines. Participants were expected from 11 countries in Southeast Asia. The games, patterned after the Paralympics, was to include athletes with various disabilities.

This was to have been the second time Philippines hosting the ASEAN Para Games with the first being in 2005.

The Games was initially set to be held in at the second week of January 2020 but was delayed to March 2020, about three months after the 2019 Southeast Asian Games, due to financial and logistical constraints despite it is only five months prior to the 2020 Summer Paralympics. The sporting event was postponed for a second time, to October 3 to 9, 2020, due to concerns over the COVID-19 pandemic. This followed the 2020 Summer Paralympics who were delayed to the following year for the same reason.

The Games were formally canceled on May 8, after the Philippine government reallocated funds meant for the games to efforts against the impact of the COVID-19 pandemic in the Philippines.

== Development ==
=== Host selection ===
It is customary for the host nation of the Southeast Asian Games to also host the ASEAN Para Games within the same year. In July 2012, Brunei was initially selected to host the 30th Southeast Asian Games; consequentially the 10th ASEAN Para Games. However, on 4 June 2015, Brunei withdrew its hosting rights to the Games due to absence of government support. The withdrawal of Brunei's hosting rights were also due to the country's lack of sporting facilities, accommodation, and preparation of their athletes.

With Brunei's withdrawal, the Philippines and Thailand expressed its interest to host the games. Vietnam, the 2021 Southeast Asian Games host, was also offered to host the 2019 SEA Games, but declined.

The Philippine Olympic Committee (POC) in July 2017 announced that the Philippines will be hosting the Games. However within the same month, the Philippine Sports Commission (PSC) addressed the POC that it is withdrawing its support for the Philippine hosting of the 2019 Games, saying that government decided to reallocate funds meant for hosting to the rehabilitation efforts of Marawi, which was left devastated following the Battle of Marawi. It was later reported that the POC's insistence on handling all matters of the hosting; finance, security and the conduct of the Games as it did for the 2005 Southeast Asian Games, which led to the withdrawal of support by the PSC. However, on August 16, the Philippines, through the POC president Peping Cojuangco, confirmed that the country will be hosting the 2019 SEA Games, after Cojuangco wrote to President Rodrigo Duterte and appealed for reconsideration.

During the closing ceremony of the 2017 ASEAN Para Games in Kuala Lumpur, the symbolic ASEAN Para Sports Federation council flag was handed over by Malaysian Paralympic Council President SM Nasarudin SM Nasimuddin to the Paralympic Committee of the Philippines (PPC) president Michael I. Barredo. In contrast of other closing ceremonies held throughout the ASEAN Para Games, only a video promoting tourism and featured disabled athletes in the Philippines was presented instead of a grand presentation for the next host country.

=== Preparations ===
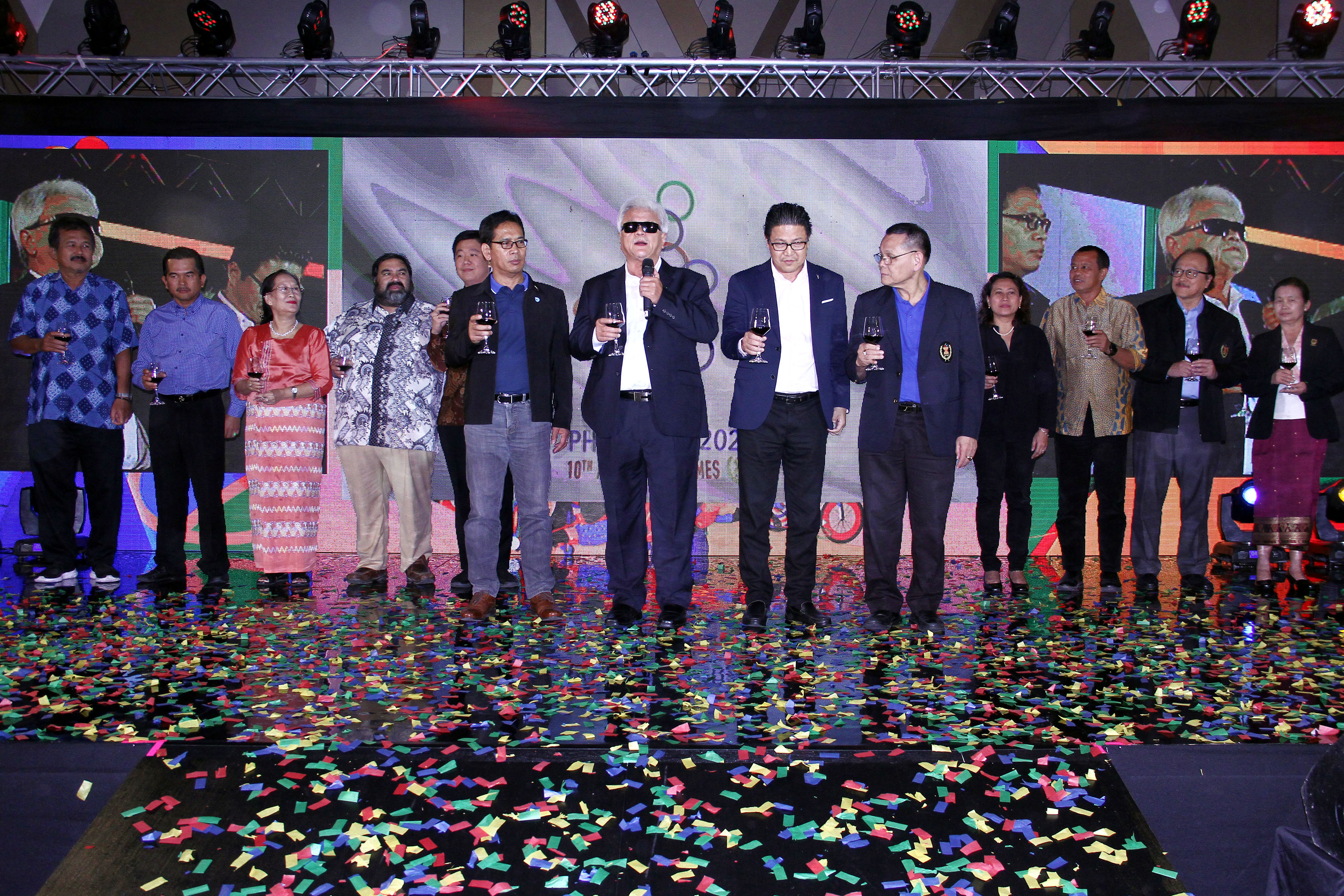
Officials of the ASEAN Para Sports Federation make a ceremonial toast to mark the one year countdown for the Games.

Preparations for the Philippines' hosting of the 10th ASEAN Para Games officially began by April 2018. Then-Secretary of Foreign Affairs Alan Peter Cayetano is serving as the chairman of the 10th ASEAN Para Games organizing committee.

The official one-year countdown for the 2020 ASEAN Para Games was held at the Novotel Manila Araneta Center in Quezon City on January 18, 2019; exactly one year before the scheduled opening of the games.

=== Delays and cancellation ===
Due to financial and logistical constraints the games were rescheduled for March 20 to 28, 2020. Malaysia formally protested the move, saying that postponing the games, affected their preparations for the competition including concerns over bookings for members of their delegation.

The Philippine Sports Commission (PSC) expressed that an undisclosed amount of television broadcast revenue from the 2019 Southeast Asian Games should be used to fund the hosting of the ASEAN Para Games.

In February, the 2020 ASEAN Para Games was postponed for the second time, due to concerns over the COVID-19 pandemic. It was initially planned that the games be held sometime between March and June before it was tentatively scheduled for October 3 to 9, 2020.

However the PSC on April 29 withdrew funding for the Games following a directive from the Inter-Agency Task Force for the Management of Emerging Infectious Diseases to defer sporting events in the Philippines until December 2020 and the government's call to redirect resources to deal with the pandemic. The ASEAN Para Sports Federation announced on May 8, the formal cancellation of the 2020 ASEAN Para Games.

== Venues ==
Just like the 2019 Southeast Asian Games, the 2020 ASEAN Para Games was to be hosted in three hubs in Clark, Manila, and Subic. The opening and closing ceremonies were planned to be held in Clark. Under the pretense that the games were to host 17 sports including a demonstration event; nine sports will be held at venues at the New Clark City and the Clark Freeport Zone, six sports at the Subic Special Economic and Freeport Zone, tenpin bowling at the Santa Lucia Lanes in Cainta, Rizal and obstacle course at the SM Aura at the Bonifacio Global City in Taguig, Metro Manila.

== The Games ==
=== Participating nations ===
All 11 members of ASEAN Para Sports Federation (APSF) were expected to take part in the 2020 ASEAN para Games. Prior to the postponement of the games to March 2020, about 1,500 athletes are expected to participate with Thailand sending the biggest delegation. Below is a list of all expected participating NPCs.

- Brunei (26)
- Cambodia (76)
- Indonesia (306)
- Laos (31)
- Malaysia (215)
- Myanmar (108)
- Philippines (274)
- Singapore (61)
- Thailand (317)
- Timor-Leste (10)
- Vietnam (109)

Note: number of listed athletes as per December 2019

=== Sports ===
The ASEAN Para Sports Federation hosted a meeting at the Bonifacio Global City in Taguig, Metro Manila from June 8 to 9 which was to determine which sports are to be contested in the 2020 Para Games. The organizers had initial plans to host 14 sports. There were additional plans to host four more sports namely: 7-a-side (cerebral palsy) football, triathlon, wheelchair tennis and shooting By January 24, the host was targeting to organize around 500 events covering 16 sports and a demonstration event.

- Pararchery
- Parathletics
- Badminton
- Boccia
- Bowling
- Chess
- Cycling (Road)
- CP Football
- Goalball
- Judo
- Powerlifting
- Sitting volleyball
- Para Swimming
- Para Table tennis
- Para Triathlon
- Wheelchair basketball
- Sitting volleyball
- Wheelchair tennis

Demonstration sports

- Obstacle racing

== See also ==
- 2005 ASEAN Para Games
- 2019 SEA Games

| Preceded by Kuala Lumpur | ASEAN Para Games; Philippines; X ASEAN Para Games (2020) | Succeeded by Surakarta |
