= 2003 ASEAN Para Games =

2nd ASEAN Para Games

II ASEAN Para Games
- Host city: Hanoi, Vietnam
- Motto: Peace, Love and Aspire
- Nations: 11
- Athletes: 740
- Events: 287 in 5 sports
- Opening: 21 December
- Closing: 27 December
- Opened by: Phạm Gia Khiêm; Deputy Prime Minister of Vietnam
- Main venue: Mỹ Đình National Stadium (opening); Hanoi Sports Palace (closing)
- Website: 2003 ASEAN Para Games

The 2003 ASEAN Para Games, officially known as the 2nd ASEAN Para Games, was a Southeast Asian disabled multi-sport event held eight days after the 2003 Southeast Asian Games in Hanoi, Vietnam from 21 to 27 December 2003. This was the first time and so far only time Vietnam hosted the ASEAN Para Games and the first time Timor-Teste participated at the ASEAN Para Games.

Vietnam is the second country to host the ASEAN Para Games after Malaysia. Around 740 athletes from 11 participating nations participated at the games, which featured 287 events in 5 sports. The games was opened by Phạm Gia Khiêm, the Deputy Prime Minister of Vietnam at the Mỹ Đình National Stadium.

The final medal tally was led by Thailand, followed by host Vietnam and Malaysia.

== Development and preparation ==
The 2nd ASEAN Para Games Organising Committee was formed to oversee the staging of the games.

=== Venues ===
The 2nd ASEAN Para Games had 5 venues for the games.

City	Competition Venue	Sports
Hanoi	National Sports Complex
Hanoi	Mỹ Đình National Stadium	Opening ceremony, Athletics
Hanoi	Mỹ Đình Aquatics Centre	Swimming
Hanoi	Other
Hanoi	Hanoi Sports Palace	Badminton, Closing ceremony
Hanoi	Cầu Giấy District Gymnasium	Table tennis
Hanoi	Trịnh Hoài Đức Gymnasium	Powerlifting

== Marketing ==
=== Logo ===
The Golden Goat, the official mascot of the games

The emblem of the 2nd ASEAN Para Games - a work by Vietnamese artist Nguyễn Thế Nguyên - is a stylised image of a wheelchair athlete with two hands raised up upwards in the shape of a "V" which symbolises Vietnam and victory. At the top of the emblem, 11 small circles linked together around the image of "Khuê Văn Các" (room for reciting poems). The linked small circles represents solidarity, cooperation, and friendship of disabled athletes among 11 countries in the Southeast Asian region, while the Khuê Văn Các represents the host country Vietnam. The colours of the athlete and the Khuê Văn Các are dark sea blue which represents unity while the colours of the 11 circles are vermilion which represents courage and passion.

=== Mascot ===
The mascot of the 2003 ASEAN Para Games is "The Golden Goat" which was designed by Nguyễn Thế Nguyên. It was selected by the Organising Committee because the year 2003, year of which Vietnam hosting the second ASEAN Para Games is a goat year in most lunar calendars, especially in Vietnamese and Chinese calendar. The goat is widely described in many art and literary works of Vietnam as a very intimate, friendly and useful animal to the people in daily life. The Golden Goat symbolises happiness, victory and courage when facing challenges. The mascot's design of wearing the sports costume, holds its left hand on its waist, and raises the right hand upwards with two fingers stretching out in a "V" shape represents the strong belief in fair-play among athletes to reach the highest achievements at the games.

=== Songs ===
The theme song of the 2003 ASEAN Para Games is "Welcome to Para Games-Hanoi" (Vietnamese: Chào Para Games Thăng Long-Hà Nội), composed by musician Nguyễn Đỗ, with English lyrics by Nguyễn Tiến Long and arranged and orchestrated by musician An Thuyên.

== The games ==
=== Opening ceremony ===
The opening ceremony was held at the My Dinh National Stadium on 21 December 2003 at 19:00 (VST - UTC+7).

=== Closing ceremony ===
The closing ceremony was held at the Hanoi Sports Palace on 27 December 2003 at 19:00 (VST).

=== Participating nations ===
- Brunei
- Cambodia
- Laos
- Indonesia
- Malaysia
- Myanmar
- Philippines
- Singapore
- Thailand
- Timor-Leste
- Vietnam

=== Sports ===
5 Sports are introduced for the 2003 ASEAN Para Games with 4 of them are Paralympics events.

- Athletics
- Badminton
- Powerlifting
- Swimming
- Table tennis

=== Medal table ===
A total of 760 medals comprising 287 gold medals, 245 silver medals and 228 bronze medals were awarded to athletes. The Host Vietnam's performance was its best ever yet in ASEAN Para Games History and was second behind Thailand as overall champion.

Key

* Host nation (Vietnam)

* Host nation (Vietnam)

Rank	Nation	Gold	Silver	Bronze	Total
1	Thailand (THA)	101	61	31	193
2	Vietnam (VIE)*	81	80	86	247
3	Malaysia (MAS)	54	40	46	140
4	Myanmar (MYA)	24	12	12	48
5	Indonesia (INA)	10	11	18	39
6	Singapore (SIN)	10	8	1	19
7	Brunei (BRU)	4	10	5	19
8	Philippines (PHI)	2	15	24	41
9	Cambodia (CAM)	1	5	3	9
10	Laos (LAO)	0	3	1	4
11	Timor-Leste (TLS)	0	0	1	1
Totals (11 entries)		287	245	228	760

== See also ==
- 2003 Southeast Asian Games

Preceded by Kuala Lumpur	ASEAN Para Games; Hanoi; II ASEAN Para Games (2003)	Succeeded by Manila
