= 2001 ASEAN Para Games =

1st ASEAN Para Games

I ASEAN Para Games
- Host city: Kuala Lumpur, Malaysia
- Motto: ASEAN Solidarity Towards Equality in Sports and in Life
- Nations: 10
- Athletes: ≈600
- Events: 341 in 2 sports
- Opening: 26 October
- Closing: 29 October
- Opened by: Sultan Mizan Zainal Abidin; Deputy Yang di-Pertuan Agong
- Main venue: Bukit Jalil National Stadium (Opening); Putra Indoor Stadium (Closing)

The 2001 ASEAN Para Games, officially known as the 1st ASEAN Para Games, was a Southeast Asian disabled multi-sport event held a month after the 2001 Southeast Asian Games. It was held in Kuala Lumpur, Malaysia from 26 to 29 October 2001. This ASEAN Para Games was the first edition held in history for Southeast Asia countries and also the first edition hosted by Malaysia.

Around 600 athletes participated at the event which featured 341 events in 2 sports. It was opened by the Acting Yang di-Pertuan Agong of Malaysia, Sultan Mizan Zainal Abidin at the Bukit Jalil National Stadium.

The final medal tally was led by host nation Malaysia, Thailand and Myanmar.

== Development and preparation ==
On 28 April 2001, the 1st ASEAN Para Games Organising Committee led by Dato' Zainal Abu Zarin was formed to oversee the staging of the games after the formation of ASEAN Para Sports Federation.

=== Venues ===
The 1st ASEAN Para Games had 2 venues for the games.

City	Competition Venue	Sports
Kuala Lumpur	National Sports Complex
Kuala Lumpur	Bukit Jalil National Stadium	Opening ceremony and athletics
Kuala Lumpur	Putra Indoor Stadium	Closing ceremony
Kuala Lumpur	National Aquatic Centre	Swimming

== Marketing ==
=== Logo ===
The logo of the 2001 ASEAN Para Games is a flower divided into 10 equally shaped triangular petals, represents the 10 ASEAN member nations, which are also the games participating nations. The 10 petal flower circular arrangement represents commitment, unity and harmony of the 10 ASEAN nations as well as equality and opportunity in sports and life for people with disabilities.

=== Mascot ===
The mascot of the 2001 ASEAN Para Games is a mousedeer named, "Ujang". The mousedeer is a native animal in Malaysia locally known as pelanduk or kancil which is shy, but very agile and quick thinking. It is a favourite character in local folktales commonly known as "Sang Kancil", noted for its intelligence, wit, cunning feints and quick reaction to escape from all kinds of danger, especially from its enemies. The adoption of mousedeer as the games' mascot is to represent the courage of the Paralympic athletes in overcoming challenges and the odds. The name of the mascot, Ujang is a common nickname for local Malay youths.

=== Songs ===
The theme song of the games composed by Dato' Zainal Abidin Abu Zarin and was sung by Siti Nurhaliza.

== The games ==
=== Opening ceremony ===
The opening ceremony was held at the Putra Stadium in Bukit Jalil at 20:00 on 26 October 2001. The games was opened the Deputy Yang di-Pertuan Agong, Mizan Zainal Abidin.

=== Closing ceremony ===
The closing ceremony was held at the Putra Stadium in Bukit Jalil at 20:00 on 29 October 2001. The games was closed by the Minister for National Unity and Community Development, Datuk Dr Siti Zaharah Sulaiman. Thai swimmer Voravit Kaw Kham was voted the Best Sportsman title, while Theresa Goh of Singapore won the Best Sportswoman title.

=== Participating nations ===
Around 700 athletes and officials had participated in the games.

- Brunei
- Cambodia
- Indonesia
- Laos
- Malaysia
- Myanmar
- Philippines
- Singapore
- Thailand
- Vietnam

=== Sports ===
Only 2 Sports are contested in the 2001 ASEAN Para Games.

- Athletics
- Swimming

=== Medal table ===
Key

* Host nation (Malaysia)

2001 ASEAN Para Games medal table
Rank	NPC	Gold	Silver	Bronze	Total
1	Malaysia (MAS)*	143	136	92	371
2	Thailand (THA)	119	65	20	204
3	Myanmar (MYA)	36	18	17	71
4	Singapore (SIN)	16	9	12	37
5	Vietnam (VIE)	11	5	6	22
6	Indonesia (INA)	6	5	7	18
7	Philippines (PHI)	5	6	10	21
8	Brunei (BRU)	4	2	7	13
9	Cambodia (CAM)	1	1	1	3
10	Laos (LAO)	0	0	0	0
Totals (10 entries)		341	247	172	760

== See also ==
- 2001 Southeast Asian Games

Preceded by Inaugural Games	ASEAN Para Games; Kuala Lumpur; I ASEAN Para Games (2001)	Succeeded by Hanoi
