= 2009 ASEAN Para Games =

5th ASEAN Para Games

V ASEAN Para Games
- Host city: Kuala Lumpur, Malaysia
- Motto: ASEAN Moving Together
- Nations: 10
- Athletes: 980
- Events: 409 in 11 sports
- Opening: 15 August
- Closing: 19 August
- Opened by: Abdullah Ahmad Badawi; Former Prime Minister of Malaysia
- Athlete's Oath: Lee Seng Chow
- Ceremony venue: Putra Indoor Stadium
- Website: 2009 ASEAN Para Games

The 2009 ASEAN Para Games, officially known as the 5th ASEAN Para Games, was a Southeast Asian disabled multi-sport event held in Kuala Lumpur, Malaysia from 15 to 19 August 2009. This was the second time Malaysia hosted the ASEAN Para Games and its first time since 2001.

Around 980 athletes participated at the Games, which featured 409 events in 11 sports. The games was opened by Abdullah Ahmad Badawi, the Former Prime Minister of Malaysia at the Putra Indoor Stadium.

The final medal tally was led by Thailand, followed by host Malaysia and Vietnam. Several Games and National records were broken during the games. The games were deemed generally successful with the effective cost spent to host the games and arrangement of public transport, commitment in environment conservation and with the rising standard of disabled sports competition amongst the Southeast Asian nations.

== Host city ==
The 5th ASEAN Para Games was originally scheduled for Laos in January 2010, but Laos begged off from hosting the games due to financial constraints and inexperience in providing disability-accessible venue adaptations for disabled athletes. Hence, the 5th ASEAN Para Games was instead held five months ahead of the Laos 2009 Southeast Asian Games in Kuala Lumpur, Malaysia from 15 to 19 August 2009, featuring 409 events in 11 sports.

== Development and preparation ==
The Kuala Lumpur Asean Para Games Organising Committee (KLAPGOC) was formed to oversee the staging of the event.

=== Venues ===
The 5th ASEAN Para Games had 11 venues for the games. 9 in Kuala Lumpur and 1 each in Selangor and Negeri Sembilan respectively.

State	Competition Venue	Sports
Kuala Lumpur	National Sports Complex
Kuala Lumpur	Bukit Jalil National Stadium	Athletics
Kuala Lumpur	Axiata Arena	Badminton, Opening and Closing ceremony
Kuala Lumpur	Sri Putra Hall	Powerlifting
Kuala Lumpur	Commonwealth Hall	Chess
Kuala Lumpur	National Aquatics Centre	Swimming
Kuala Lumpur	Other
Kuala Lumpur	Mega Lanes Endah Parade, Sri Petaling	Bowling
Kuala Lumpur	OCM Indoor Sports Arena, Jalan Hang Jebat	Table Tennis
Kuala Lumpur	National Tennis Complex, Jalan Duta	Wheelchair Tennis
Kuala Lumpur	Titiwangsa Stadium, Titiwangsa Lake	Sitting Volleyball
Selangor	MPSJ Indoor Stadium, Serdang	Wheelchair Basketball
Negeri Sembilan	Admiral Marina and Leisure Club, Port Dickson	Sailing

=== Public transport ===
Shuttle bus services, Rapid KL Buses were provided throughout the games and were used to ferry athletes and officials to and from the airport, games venues and games village.

=== Sustainability ===
Committed in conserving the environment, the games organiser gave each medal winner of the Games an opportunity to plant a tree at the Paralympic Park.

== Marketing ==
=== Logo ===
"Ujang" the chevrotain, the official mascot of the 5th ASEAN Para Games.

The logo of the 2009 ASEAN Para Games is an image of a heart shape surrounded by ten doves which represents the ten ASEAN nations. The initial KL in the logo represents Kuala Lumpur, the capital of Malaysia as the host of the games, the number ’09 represents the year 2009, the heart shape in the ‘0’ represents the loving, caring and hospitality of Malaysian people, while the brush stroke sphere represents the unity of the ASEAN Community. The Games logo is mostly rehashed from the 2006 FESPIC Games logo, and due to Malaysian athletes excellent performance at the 2006 FESPIC Games, the rehash of the 2006 FESPIC Games logo as the 2009 edition games logo is meant to reflect Malaysia's intention to replicate its 2006 FESPIC Games success at the 2009 ASEAN Para Games.

=== Mascot ===
The mascot of the 2009 ASEAN Para Games is a mousedeer named, "Ujang". The mousedeer is a native animal in Malaysia locally known as pelanduk or kancil which is shy, but very agile and quick thinking. It is a favourite character in local folktales commonly known as "Sang Kancil", noted for its intelligence, wit, cunning feints and quick reaction to escape from all kinds of danger, especially from its enemies. The adoption of mousedeer as the games mascot is to represent the courage of the Paralympic athletes in overcoming challenges and the odds. The name of the mascot, Ujang is a common nickname for local Malay youths. Also, Ujang was used as the mascot of the 2001 ASEAN Para Games.

== The games ==
=== Opening ceremony ===
The opening ceremony was held on Thursday, 15 August 2009, beginning at 20:00 MST (UTC+8) at the Putra Indoor Stadium in Kuala Lumpur. The opening ceremony begins with the cultural performances by a troupe from Kuala Lumpur City Hall followed by a march past by the 10 contingents taking part in the games. After all the contingents took their respective places, former prime minister of Malaysia Abdullah Ahmad Badawi was given the honour to declare the meet open. This was followed by six Malaysian national paralympians, Abdullah Daud (swimming), Mohd Noor Isa (badminton), Norisah Bahrom (wheelchair tennis), Mohd Fazli Fauzil (athletics), Julius Jeranding (swimming) and Muira Mukri (chess) bringing in the Games flag before being presented to six Royal Malaysian Navy personnel to be hoisted. National paralympian Lee Seng Chow, a track and field athlete, then lead the gathered paralympians in taking the athletes' oath. This was followed by four national paralympians - Nadrul Shakir Nor Zainal (swimming), Marriappan Perumal (powerlifting), Siow Lee Chan (powerlifting) and Mohd Riduan Emeari (athletics) ushering in the Games torch before the cauldron was lit. Finally, a 120-strong gymnastics group from Soka Gakkai entertained the spectators to a gymnastic performance reflecting the spirit of unity, courage and harmony.

=== Closing ceremony ===
The closing ceremony was held on Monday, 19 August 2009, beginning at 20:00 MST (UTC+8) at the Putra Indoor Stadium in Kuala Lumpur. The closing ceremony begins with a series of song performance by local Malay singers. After the performance, the best sportsman and best sportswoman trophy were awarded to a swimming sportsman from Thailand and a swimming sportswoman from Vietnam respectively. This was followed by a speech from Dato' Zainal Abu Zarin, the president of the ASEAN Para Sports Federation. Representatives from Malaysia Book of Records then awarded certificate to the games committee to recognise the games as a smoking-free games. After that, Ahmad Shabery Cheek, then Malaysian Minister of Youth and Sports gave his speech and officially declared the games closed. The flag of the ASEAN Para Sports Federation was lowered by the six Royal Malaysian Navy personnel and the cauldron was extinguished. The ASEAN Para Games responsibilities was officially handed over to Indonesia, host of the 2011 ASEAN Para Games, where the Indonesia ambassador received the flag of the ASEAN Para Sports Federation as its symbolisation. The troupe from Kuala Lumpur City Hall, the same troupe who performed at the opening ceremony before, concluded the ceremony with a cultural performance.

=== Participating nations ===
- Brunei (30)
- Cambodia (11)
- Indonesia (99)
- Laos (24)
- Malaysia (258)
- Myanmar (36)
- Philippines (60)
- Singapore (98)
- Thailand (203)
- Vietnam (116)

Did not enter

- East Timor was absent from the games due to financial constraint.

=== Sports ===
- Athletics
- Powerlifting
- Chess
- Sailing
- Swimming
- Badminton
- Bowling
- Sitting Volleyball
- Table tennis
- Wheelchair basketball
- Wheelchair tennis

=== Medal table ===
A total of 936 medals comprising 409 gold medals, 288 silver medals and 239 bronze medals were awarded to athletes. The Host Malaysia's performance was their second best in ASEAN Para Games History and was second behind Thailand as overall champion.

Key

* Host nation (Malaysia)

Rank	Nation	Gold	Silver	Bronze	Total
1	Thailand (THA)	157	75	57	289
2	Malaysia (MAS)*	94	81	71	246
3	Vietnam (VIE)	73	57	45	175
4	Indonesia (INA)	29	25	19	73
5	Philippines (PHI)	24	24	26	74
6	Singapore (SIN)	14	5	3	22
7	Brunei (BRU)	9	5	8	22
8	Myanmar (MYA)	8	13	5	26
9	Cambodia (CAM)	1	2	4	7
10	Laos (LAO)	0	1	1	2
Totals (10 entries)		409	288	239	936

== See also ==
- 2009 Southeast Asian Games

Preceded by Nakhon Ratchasima	ASEAN Para Games; Kuala Lumpur; V ASEAN Para Games (2009)	Succeeded by Surakarta
