= 2011 ASEAN Para Games =

6th ASEAN Para Games

VI ASEAN Para Games
- Host city: Surakarta, Central Java, Indonesia
- Motto: United and rising through sports for all
- Nations: 11
- Athletes: 870
- Events: 380 in 11 sports
- Opening: 15 December
- Closing: 20 December
- Opened by: Boediono; Vice President of Indonesia
- Ceremony venue: Manahan Stadium
- Website: 2011 ASEAN Para Games

The 2011 ASEAN Para Games, officially known as 6th ASEAN Para Games, was a Southeast Asian disabled multi-sport event held in Surakarta, Central Java three weeks after the 2011 Southeast Asian Games from 15 to 20 December 2011.

Around 870 athletes from 11 participating nations participated at the games which featured 380 events in 11 sports. This was the first time Indonesia hosted the ASEAN Para Games. The games was opened by Vice President Boediono of Indonesia at the Manahan Stadium.

The final medal tally was led by Thailand, followed by host Indonesia and Malaysia. Several Games and National records were broken during the games. The games were deemed generally successful with the rising standard of disabled sports competition amongst the Southeast Asian nations.

== Host city ==
The 6th ASEAN Para Games was hosted by Surakarta (Solo), Central Java. Previously, Indonesia hosted the 2011 Southeast Asian Games in Jakarta and Palembang. But given the fact that both the Southeast Asian Games host did not provide disabled-friendly facilities, Surakarta was chosen as the host city of the games because it provides facilities friendly to disabled athletes.

== Development and preparation ==
The Indonesian ASEAN Para Games Organising Committee (INASPOC) led by Prof. James Tangkudong under the aegis of the National Paralympic Committee of Indonesia was formed to oversee the staging of the event.

=== Venues ===
The 6th ASEAN Para Games had 11 venues for the games.

| Province | Competition Venue | Sports |
Central Java
| Central Java | Srivedari Stadium | Archery |
| Central Java | Manahan Stadium | Athletics, Opening and Closing ceremony |
| Central Java | Sritex Arena Sports Center | Badminton |
| Central Java | Bengawan Sport Hall | Bowling |
| Central Java | Pendopo Balaikota City Hall | Chess |
| Central Java | Nyi Ageng Karang Gymnasium Karanganyar | Goalball |
| Central Java | Gedung Wanita Sport Hall | Powerlifting |
| Central Java | Tirtomoyo Manahan Aquatic Centre | Swimming |
| Central Java | Diamond Convention Center | Table tennis |
| Central Java | Manahan Sports Center | Sitting Volleyball |
| Central Java | Manahan Tennis Court | Wheelchair Tennis |

=== Athletes' Village ===
The games was used the Athletes' Village at Hajj Dormitory in Donohudan, Boyolali, which was renovated to accommodate the needs of disabled athletes.

=== Public transport ===
Shuttle bus services were provided throughout the games and were used to ferry athletes and officials to and from the airport, games venues and games village.

== Marketing ==
=== Logo ===
The Official Mascot.

The logo of the 2011 ASEAN Para Games is a Garuda image which includes the ASEAN Para Sports Federation logo in within. The national symbol of Indonesia, the Garuda represents strength, its wings epitomise glory and splendour. The green strokes symbolise the islands, forests and mountainous terrain of the Indonesian archipelago, while the blue strokes represents the vast Nusantara ocean which unifies differences. Land and water or Tanah Air in Indonesian means fatherland. Red strokes represent courage, zeal and burning passion to give the best for the country.

=== Mascot ===
The mascot of the 2011 ASEAN Para Games are a pair of Komodo dragons named Modo and Modi, which were also the mascots used in the 2011 Southeast Asian Games. Komodo dragons are found in the Komodo National Park and the adoption of Komodo dragons as the games' mascot was due to it being an animal endemic to Indonesia and to promote the Komodo National Park as a candidate for the New 7 Wonders of Nature online contest.

Modo, the male Komodo dragon is dressed in a dark brown surjan comodo, traditional clothing of Central Java, with dark brown pants and a batik blangkon headcloth, a typical Javanese male headcover, while the female dragon Modi wears a fashionable bun konde or wig headdress and dressed in batik kebaya. The word "Modo," is short for Komodo, while the mascot's name "Modo and Modi" is similar to the Indonesian word Muda-Mudi meaning "youth" which refers to the youths of Indonesia. The name of the mascot was chosen to represent hardworking, honest, fair, friendly and sportsmanship values of youths of Indonesia and to reflect the positive personality of Indonesians, harmony, co-operation and friendship among participating countries in the ASEAN Para Games.

== The games ==
=== Opening ceremony ===
The opening ceremony was held at the Manahan Stadium on 15 December 2011 at 19:00 Western Indonesia Time (UTC+7). Boediono, the Indonesian Vice-President officially opened the Games.

=== Closing ceremony ===
The closing ceremony was held at the Manahan Stadium on 21 December 2011 at 19:00 Western Indonesia Time. The Games was officially closed by Agung Laksono, Coordinating Minister of People's Welfare of the Republic of Indonesia and the ASEAN Para Games responsibilities was officially handed over to Myanmar, host of the 2014 ASEAN Para Games.

=== Participating nations ===
- Brunei (24)
- Cambodia (18)
- Indonesia (235)
- Laos (7)
- Malaysia (122)
- Myanmar (36)
- Philippines (46)
- Singapore (32)
- Thailand (205)
- East Timor (24)
- Vietnam (121)

=== Sports ===
Indonesian Paralympic Organising Committee (INASPOC) President James Tangkudung confirmed a total of 11 sports for the games for the games. Sailing which debuted as a medal sport in the 2009 ASEAN Para Games, was not included by the organisers in this edition of the Games, despite the 2011 SEA Games included Sailing in its sport line-up.

- Archery
- Athletics
- Badminton
- Chess
- Goalball
- Powerlifting
- Swimming
- Table Tennis
- Bowling
- Sitting volleyball
- Wheelchair tennis

=== Medal table ===
A total of 1051 medals comprising 380 gold medals, 338 silver medals and 333 bronze medals were awarded to athletes. The host Indonesia's performance was its best ever yet in ASEAN Para Games History and was second behind Thailand as overall champion.

* Host nation (Indonesia)

| Rank | Nation | Gold | Silver | Bronze | Total |
|---|---|---|---|---|---|
| 1 | Thailand (THA) | 126 | 96 | 73 | 295 |
| 2 | Indonesia (INA)* | 113 | 108 | 89 | 310 |
| 3 | Malaysia (MAS) | 51 | 36 | 45 | 132 |
| 4 | Vietnam (VIE) | 44 | 44 | 72 | 160 |
| 5 | Philippines (PHI) | 23 | 23 | 18 | 64 |
| 6 | Myanmar (MYA) | 11 | 8 | 12 | 31 |
| 7 | Singapore (SIN) | 9 | 10 | 9 | 28 |
| 8 | Brunei (BRU) | 3 | 5 | 8 | 16 |
| 9 | Cambodia (CAM) | 0 | 5 | 2 | 7 |
| 10 | Timor-Leste (TLS) | 0 | 2 | 4 | 6 |
| 11 | Laos (LAO) | 0 | 1 | 1 | 2 |
| Totals (11 entries) | | 380 | 338 | 333 | 1,051 |

== See also ==
- 2011 Southeast Asian Games

| Preceded by Kuala Lumpur | ASEAN Para Games; Surakarta; VI ASEAN Para Games (2011) | Succeeded by Naypyidaw |
