= 2014 ASEAN Para Games =

7th ASEAN Para Games

VII ASEAN Para Games
- Host city: Naypyidaw, Myanmar
- Motto: Friendship, Equality and Unity
- Nations: 10
- Athletes: 1482
- Events: 359 in 12 sports
- Opening: 14 January
- Closing: 20 January
- Opened by: Sai Mauk Kham; Vice President of Myanmar
- Closed by: Nyan Tun; Vice President of Myanmar
- Athlete's Oath: Min Min Phyo
- Judge's Oath: Mya Lay Phyu
- Torch lighter: U Kyaw Khaing
- Ceremony venue: Wunna Theikdi Stadium
- Website: 2014 ASEAN Para Games

The 2014 ASEAN Para Games, officially known as the 7th ASEAN Para Games, was a Southeast Asian disabled multi-sport event held in Naypyidaw, Myanmar three weeks after the closing of the 2013 Southeast Asian Games from 14 to 20 January 2014. This was the first time Myanmar hosted the ASEAN Para Games.

Myanmar is the sixth country to host the ASEAN Para Games after Malaysia, Vietnam, Philippines, Thailand and Indonesia. Around 1482 athletes participated at the games which featured 359 events in 12 sports. It was opened by Vice President of Myanmar, Sai Mauk Kham at the Wunna Theikdi Stadium.

The final medal tally was led by Indonesia, followed by Thailand and Malaysia with host Myanmar in fifth place. Several Games and National records were broken during the games. The games were deemed generally successful with the rising standard of disabled sports competition amongst the Southeast Asian nations.

== Host city ==
The 7th ASEAN Para Games was held in Naypyidaw, Myanmar and it was also for the very first time Myanmar host the ASEAN Para Games.

Previously, the Southeast Asian Games Federation (SEAGF) Council met in Jakarta on 31 May 2010 earlier unanimously agreed to award the Myanmar Olympic Committee the right to host the 27th edition of the Southeast Asian Games. This means the hosting rights of the 7th ASEAN Para Games automatically goes to Myanmar which hosted the games three weeks after the end of the 2013 Southeast Asian Games.

== Development and preparation ==
The Naypyidaw ASEAN Para Games Organising Committee (NAPGOC) was established under the guidance of the ASEAN Para Sports Federation to ensure the success of the 2014 ASEAN Para Games.

=== Venues ===
The 7th ASEAN Para Games had 9 venues for the games.

City	Competition Venue	Sports
Naypyidaw	Wunna Theikdi Sports Complex
Naypyidaw	Wunna Theikdi Stadium	Opening and Closing ceremony, Athletics (track)
Naypyidaw	Football field 1	Athletics (field)
Naypyidaw	Training sports ground	Football 7-a-side
Naypyidaw	Aquatic centre	Swimming
Naypyidaw	Billiards and snooker stadium	Chess
Naypyidaw	Boxing Indoor Stadium	Powerlifting
Naypyidaw	Training hall 2	Football 5-a-side
Naypyidaw	Indoor stadium	Boccia, Table tennis, Sitting volleyball, Wheelchair basketball, Goalball
Naypyidaw	Other
Naypyidaw	Naypyidaw Archery range, Zabuthiri Township	Archery

=== Public transport ===
As Naypyidaw is yet to be fully developed into a city, only shuttle bus services were provided throughout the games and were used to ferry athletes and officials to and from the airport, games venues and games village.

== Marketing ==
=== Logo ===
"Ko Zee Gwet", The official mascot

The logo of the 2014 ASEAN Para Games is the shape of Myanmar Map depicted as a sprinter who is in the energetic momentum. The colour of the map yellow, green and red, also the colours of the flag of Myanmar represents Myanmar as the host of the games while the sprinter in the logo who hold the Asean Para Sports Federation logo at the tips of the finger represents the successful holding of the 7th ASEAN Para Games in Myanmar.

=== Mascot ===
The official mascot of the 2014 ASEAN Para Games is an owl named Ko Zee Gwet, meaning brother owl in Burmese. It is said in Myanmar which is described as a country with civilisation, replicas of Owl are kept by people as lucky charms in their living rooms, work places and shops. The adoption of the owl is meant to represent good luck and hope for the games' successful hosting. Ko Zee Gwet is of almost the same owl species as Shwe Yoe and Ma Moe, the mascots of the 2013 Southeast Asian Games.

=== Songs ===
Two songs were composed for the 2014 ASEAN Para Games. They were "Para Games" composed by a Myanmar singer which is the games theme song and "It means to you all" composed by Soe Moe Htet.

=== Sponsors ===
- Senstech Malaysia
- Nationman
- Blue Ocean
- Ossur
- Otto Bock
- Coco Lighthouse

== The games ==
=== Opening ceremony ===
The Opening Ceremony was held in Wunna Theikdi Stadium in Naypyidaw - the capital of Myanmar on 14 January 2014 at 5:30pm [MST]. It was held according to the 15 items. Before the ceremony, singers, disabled persons performed with 10 songs including the 7th ASEAN Para Games Theme Song -"Para Games". The Ceremony started by the Countdown program which 1,200 students performed and the Opening Ceremony began. Vice President Sai Mauk Kham officially opened the 7th ASEAN Para Games. Torch relay was passed through the hands of nine former Myanmar athletes. For the lighting of the ASEAN Para Games flame, the 11 gold medalist athletic player U Kyaw Khaing lit the flame to the top of the flower cauldron by javelin to the target and the flame fired to the top of the cauldron. Then, the ceremony continued by the 4 performances - Myanmar traditional and culture dances- including the performance called " The bank of Pollen " which was performed by hundreds of the deaf children from Mary Chafmine School. The Opening Ceremony concluded successfully at 9:30pm.

=== Closing ceremony ===
The Closing Ceremony was held on 20 January 2014 at the Wunna Theikdi Stadium at 6:00pm (MST). It was held according to the 10 items. At the start of the ceremony, 3 songs and 3 performances including the 7th ASEAN Para Games Theme Song. Then, the ceremony was held according to the items. Vice-President Nyan Tun officially closed the ceremony and fireworks went round the stadium. The ASEAN Para Games responsibilities was officially handed over to Singapore, host of the 2015 ASEAN Para Games. Kelvin Tan from Singapore entertained with an incredible song " Treasure Every Moment " accompanied by wheel chair Samba dance. After that, the ceremony was concluded by the performance " We'll meet again " which was also performed at the 27th SEA Games Myanmar closing ceremony and then songs were sung by Myanmar famous singers and kids.

=== Participating nations ===
Around 1482 athletes had participated in the games.

- Brunei (48 athletes)
- Cambodia (32)
- Indonesia (195)
- Laos (48)
- Malaysia (232)
- Myanmar (269)
- Philippines (79)
- Singapore (88)
- Thailand (323)
- Vietnam (168)

Did not enter

- East Timor was absent from the 2014 games edition because of a lack of funds.

=== Sports ===
Twelve sports were contested in this edition of ASEAN Para Games.

- Archery
- Athletics
- Boccia
- Chess
- Football 5-a-side
- Football 7-a-side
- Goalball
- Powerlifting
- Swimming
- Table tennis
- Sitting Volleyball
- Wheelchair basketball

=== Medal table ===
A total of 1000 medals, comprising 359 gold medals, 330 silver medals and 311 bronze medals were awarded to athletes. The host Myanmar's performance was their second best in ASEAN Para Games history, and were placed fifth overall among participating nations.

* Host nation (Myanmar)

Rank	Nation	Gold	Silver	Bronze	Total
1	Indonesia (INA)	99	69	49	217
2	Thailand (THA)	96	82	70	248
3	Malaysia (MAS)	50	49	41	140
4	Vietnam (VIE)	48	65	72	185
5	Myanmar (MYA)*	34	26	36	96
6	Philippines (PHI)	20	19	21	60
7	Singapore (SIN)	7	10	10	27
8	Cambodia (CAM)	3	4	2	9
9	Brunei (BRU)	2	3	7	12
10	Laos (LAO)	0	3	3	6
Totals (10 entries)		359	330	311	1,000

== See also ==
- 2013 Southeast Asian Games

Preceded by Surakarta	ASEAN Para Games; Naypyidaw; VII ASEAN Para Games (2014)	Succeeded by Singapore
