= 2008 ASEAN Para Games =

4th ASEAN Para Games

IV ASEAN Para Games
- Host city: Nakhon Ratchasima, Thailand
- Motto: Friendship, Equality, Opportunity
- Nations: 11
- Athletes: 1000
- Events: 488 in 14 sports
- Opening: 20 January
- Closing: 26 January
- Opened by: Surayud Chulanont; Prime Minister of Thailand
- Ceremony venue: 80th Birthday Stadium
- Website: 2008 ASEAN Para Games

The 2008 ASEAN Para Games, officially known as the 4th ASEAN Para Games, was a Southeast Asian disabled multi-sport event held in Nakhon Ratchasima, Thailand from 20 to 26 January 2008, one month after the 2007 Southeast Asian Games. This was the first time Thailand hosted the ASEAN Para Games.

Around 1000 athletes from 11 participating nations participated at the games which featured 488 events in 14 sports. Thailand is the fourth nation to host the games after Malaysia, Vietnam and the Philippines. The games was opened and by Surayud Chulanont, the prime minister of Thailand at the 80th Birthday Stadium.

The final medal tally was led by host Thailand, followed by Malaysia and Vietnam. Several Games and national records were broken during the games. The games were deemed generally successful with the rising standard of disabled sports competition amongst the Southeast Asian nations.

== Development and preparation ==
The 4th ASEAN Para Games Organising Committee was formed to oversee the staging of the games.

=== Venues ===
The 4th ASEAN Para Games had 14 venues for the games.

Province	Competition venue	Sports
Nakhon Ratchasima	80th Birthday Sports Complex
Nakhon Ratchasima	80th Birthday Stadium	Opening and closing ceremonies, Athletics
Nakhon Ratchasima	Gymnasium	Boccia, Goalball
Nakhon Ratchasima	Swimming Pool	Swimming
Nakhon Ratchasima	Tennis Court	Wheelchair tennis
Nakhon Ratchasima	Suranaree University of Technology
Nakhon Ratchasima	Campus Compound	Classification
Nakhon Ratchasima	Football Stadium	Archery
Nakhon Ratchasima	Suranareepirom Building	Badminton
Nakhon Ratchasima	Surasammanakan Building	Chess
Nakhon Ratchasima	Surapat 3 Building	Fencing
Nakhon Ratchasima	Shooting Field	shooting
Nakhon Ratchasima	Surapat 2 Building 3rd Floor	Table tennis
Nakhon Ratchasima	Keelapirom Building	Wheelchair Basketball
Nakhon Ratchasima	Other
Nakhon Ratchasima	Rajamangala of Technology Isan	Judo
Nakhon Ratchasima	Chanapolkhan Institute of Technology	Powerlifting

== Marketing ==
=== Logo ===
Nok-Kao Karom, the dove, the Official Mascot of the Games

The logo of the 2008 ASEAN Para Games is the Chumpol Gate, a historical place in Nakhon Ratchasima, Thailand. Chumpol Gate represents victory. It also denotes the exquisite Thai art and culture. Curvy blue and red lines represent the pageantry of fluttering flags leading eager, excited athletes marching into the stadium. The ASEAN Para Sports Federation logo sits in the centre of the emblem, representing friendship and co-operation between participants from ASEAN countries.

=== Mascot ===
The mascot of the 2008 ASEAN Para Games, is a dove named Nok-Khao karom which is recognised as a symbol of Nakhon Ratchasima Province. Nok-Khao Karom is a local animal name of Nakhon Ratchasima for dove. Karom is described as a wise, cheerful, gentle, and friendly, reflecting the characteristics of Thai people. The name of the dove is also the abbreviation of the games' values namely, Kind, Appreciation, Reliable, Optimistic, and Manners.

== The games ==
=== Opening ceremony ===
The opening ceremony was held at the 80th Birthday Stadium on 20 January 2008 at 19:00 (TST). The games was declared opened by Thai Prime Minister Surayud Chulanont.

=== Closing ceremony ===
The closing ceremony was held at the 80th Birthday Stadium on 26 January 2008 at 19:00 (TST). The ASEAN Para Games responsibilities was officially handed over to Malaysia, host of the 2009 ASEAN Para Games after Laos, the host of the 2009 Southeast Asian Games, declined to host the games, citing financial difficulties.

=== Participating nations ===
- Brunei
- Cambodia
- Indonesia
- Laos
- Malaysia
- Myanmar
- Philippines
- Singapore
- Thailand
- Timor-Leste
- Vietnam

=== Sports ===
- Archery
- Athletics
- Badminton
- Boccia
- Chess
- Wheelchair fencing
- Goalball
- Judo
- Powerlifting
- Shooting
- Swimming
- Table tennis
- Wheelchair basketball
- Wheelchair tennis

=== Medal table ===
A total of 1052 medals comprising 488 gold medals, 320 silver medals and 244 bronze medals were awarded to athletes. The Host Thailand's performance was their best ever yet in ASEAN Para Games History and emerged as overall champion of the games.

Key

* Host nation (Thailand)

* Host nation (Thailand)

Rank	Nation	Gold	Silver	Bronze	Total
1	Thailand (THA)*	257	109	84	450
2	Malaysia (MAS)	82	74	46	202
3	Vietnam (VIE)	78	66	43	187
4	Indonesia (INA)	33	25	18	76
5	Philippines (PHI)	17	21	21	59
6	Myanmar (MYA)	12	11	12	35
7	Singapore (SIN)	6	8	5	19
8	Brunei (BRU)	3	4	10	17
9	Laos (LAO)	0	1	3	4
10	Cambodia (CAM)	0	1	0	1
11	Timor-Leste (TLS)	0	0	2	2
Totals (11 entries)		488	320	244	1,052

== See also ==
- 2007 Southeast Asian Games

Preceded by Manila	ASEAN Para Games; Nakhon Ratchasima; IV ASEAN Para Games (2008)	Succeeded by Kuala Lumpur
