= 2005 ASEAN Para Games =

3rd ASEAN Para Games

III ASEAN Para Games
- Host city: Manila, Philippines
- Motto: Triumph of the Competitive Spirit
- Nations: 11
- Athletes: 1000
- Events: 394 in 10 sports
- Opening: 14 December
- Closing: 20 December
- Opened by: Lito Atienza; Mayor of Manila
- Ceremony venue: Rizal Memorial Stadium
- Website: 2005 ASEAN Para Games

The 2005 ASEAN Para Games, officially known as the 3rd ASEAN Para Games, was a Southeast Asian disabled multi-sport event held in Manila, Philippines from 14 to 20 December 2005, nine days after the 2005 Southeast Asian Games. This was the first and the only time so far Philippines hosted the ASEAN Para Games.

Philippines is the third country to host the ASEAN Para Games after Malaysia and Vietnam. Approximately 1000 athletes from 11 participating nations participated at the games which featured 394 events in 10 sports. The games was opened by Lito Atienza, the Mayor of Manila at the Rizal Memorial Stadium.

The final medal tally was led by Thailand, followed by Vietnam and Malaysia with host Philippines in sixth place. Several Games and National records were broken during the games. The games were deemed generally successful, with the rising standards of disabled sports competition amongst the Southeast Asian nations.

== Development and preparation ==
The 3rd ASEAN Para Games Organising Committee was formed to oversee the staging of the games.

=== Venues ===
The 3rd ASEAN Para Games had 11 venues for the games.

| City | Competition Venue | Sports |
| Manila | Rizal Memorial Sports Complex |
| Manila | Rizal Memorial Coliseum | Judo |
| Manila | Rizal Memorial Stadium | Opening and closing ceremony, Athletics |
| Manila | Rizal Memorial Swimming Pool | Swimming |
| Manila | Rizal Memorial Tennis Court | Wheelchair Tennis |
| Manila | Other |
| Manila | Emilio Aguinaldo College Gymnasium | Powerlifting, Wheelchair Basketball |
| Manila | GSIS Hall | Chess |
| Manila | Ninoy Aquino Gym | Table tennis |
| Manila | PSC Badminton Hall | Badminton |
| Manila | San Andres Gym | Goalball |
| Manila | Baywalk, Roxas Blvd, Manila Yacht Club | Sailing demo |

== Marketing ==
=== Logo ===
Buboy Butanding, a whale shark, is the official mascot of the Games.

The logo of the 2005 ASEAN Para Games is an image of an athlete reaching for the stars. The logo was inspired by previous Paralympic Games logos and the 1992 Summer Olympics logo. The four colours represent the four primary colours of the Philippine flag. The three stars symbolise the three main geographical regions of the Philippines as well as the three objectives of the games. The upward position of the arm symbolises the aspiration for equality and regional unity.

=== Mascot ===
The mascot of the 2005 ASEAN Para Games is a whale shark named Buboy Butanding. The whale shark is said to be the largest fish in the world, which can be seen in the waters off the eastern coast of the province of Sorsogon.

=== Songs ===
The games' theme song is Power Of My Dream sung by Broadway actress and Tony Award winner Lea Salonga.

== The games ==
=== Opening ceremony ===
The opening ceremony was held at the Rizal Memorial Stadium on 14 December 2005 at 20:00 (PST). The games was opened by Manila's Mayor, Lito Atienza.

=== Closing ceremony ===
The closing ceremony was held at the Rizal Memorial Stadium on 20 December 2005 at 20:00 (PST). The ASEAN Para Games responsibilities was handed over to Thailand, host of the 2008 ASEAN Para Games.

=== Participating nations ===
- Brunei
- Cambodia
- Indonesia
- Laos
- Malaysia
- Myanmar
- Philippines
- Singapore
- Thailand
- Timor-Leste
- Vietnam

=== Sports ===
Main sports

10 Main Sports are introduced for the 2005 ASEAN Para Games, with 8 of them are Paralympics events.

- Athletics
- Badminton
- Chess
- Goalball
- Judo
- Powerlifting
- Swimming
- Table tennis
- Wheelchair basketball
- Wheelchair tennis

Demonstration sports

4 Demonstration Sports are introduced along with the 10 main sports in the games. Among the various sports introduced was sailing, using the disability-friendly Access 2.3 Dinghys. This sport is open to those with mobility disabilities, amputees, visual disabilities and those with cerebral palsy as detailed by the International Association For Disabled Sailing rules. The sailing demo introduced the ease of dinghy sailing to disabled guests, as coached by disabled sailors from Malaysia, Singapore and host country Philippines. The subsequent 4-part triangle course race between said representatives from the 3 countries, was also held near Baywalk, Roxas Boulevard and the Manila Yacht Club. After the games, two Access 2.3 dinghys were donated by Sailability Singapore to the Philippine Sailing Association to encourage people with any type of disability, the elderly, the financially and socially disadvantaged to start sailing in the Philippines. The others demonstration sports introduced being Boccia, Wheelchair fencing, and Ten-pin bowling.

- Boccia
- Wheelchair fencing
- Sailing
- Ten-pin bowling

=== Medal table ===
A total of 784 medals comprising 394 gold medals, 236 silver medals and 154 bronze medals were awarded to athletes. The Host Philippines' performance was their best ever yet in ASEAN Para Games History and was placed sixth overall among participating nations.

Key

* Host nation (Philippines)

* Host nation (Philippines)

| Rank | Nation | Gold | Silver | Bronze | Total |
|---|---|---|---|---|---|
| 1 | Thailand (THA) | 139 | 64 | 28 | 231 |
| 2 | Vietnam (VIE) | 80 | 36 | 22 | 138 |
| 3 | Malaysia (MAS) | 75 | 40 | 26 | 141 |
| 4 | Indonesia (INA) | 30 | 26 | 20 | 76 |
| 5 | Myanmar (MYA) | 29 | 12 | 4 | 45 |
| 6 | Philippines (PHI)* | 19 | 39 | 37 | 95 |
| 7 | Singapore (SIN) | 15 | 9 | 9 | 33 |
| 8 | Brunei (BRU) | 7 | 5 | 5 | 17 |
| 9 | Cambodia (CAM) | 0 | 3 | 2 | 5 |
| 10 | Laos (LAO) | 0 | 2 | 1 | 3 |
| 11 | Timor-Leste (TLS) | 0 | 0 | 0 | 0 |
| Totals (11 entries) | | 394 | 236 | 154 | 784 |

== See also ==
- 2005 Southeast Asian Games

| Preceded by Hanoi | ASEAN Para Games; Manila; III ASEAN Para Games (2005) | Succeeded by Nakhon Ratchasima |
