= Malaysia at the 2022 ASEAN Para Games =

- IPC code: MAS
- NPC: Paralympic Council of Malaysia
- Website: www.paralympic.org.my (in English)

in Surakarta, Indonesia
- Competitors: 73 (64 men and 9 women) in 11 sports
- Flag bearers: Mohd Zikri Zakaria (athletics)
- Officials: 43
- Medals Ranked 4th: Gold 36 Silver 20 Bronze 13 Total 69

ASEAN Para Games appearances (overview)
- 2001; 2003; 2005; 2008; 2009; 2011; 2014; 2015; 2017; 2022; 2023

Malaysia competed at the 2022 ASEAN Para Games in Surakarta, Indonesia from 30 July to 6 August 2022. The Malaysian contingent consisted of 73 athletes and 43 officials where it is the smallest contingent sent to the games since the first edition in 2001.

Overall, Malaysia won 36 golds more than the previous target of 16 golds.

== Medal summary ==
=== Medal by sport ===
Medals by sport
Sport	1st place, gold medalist(s)	2nd place, silver medalist(s)	3rd place, bronze medalist(s)	Total
Archery	2	1	1	4
Athletics	8	9	2	19
Badminton	3	1	4	8
Goalball	0	0	1	1
Powerlifting	3	2	3	8
Swimming	18	5	0	23
Table tennis	1	1	0	2
Wheelchair tennis	1	1	2	4
Total	36	20	13	69

=== Medal by date ===
Medals by date
Date	1st place, gold medalist(s)	2nd place, silver medalist(s)	3rd place, bronze medalist(s)	Total
31 July	0	0	0	0
1 August	10	3	0	13
2 August	3	8	1	12
3 August	5	1	3	9
4 August	6	3	8	17
5 August	12	5	2	19
Total	36	20	13	69

=== Medalists ===
Medal	Name	Sport	Event	Date
Gold	Muhammad Ziyad Zolkefli	Athletics	Men's shot put F20	1 August
Gold	Eddy Bernard	Athletics	Men's long jump T44	1 August
Gold	Mohamad Ridzuan Mohamad Puzi	Athletics	Men's 100 m T35/36	1 August
Gold	Muhamad Zikri Zakaria	Athletics	Men's shot put F53-55	1 August
Gold	Fraidden Dawan	Swimming	Men's 400 m freestyle S10	1 August
Gold	Mohd Adib Iqbal Abdullah	Swimming	Men's 100 m breaststroke S14	1 August
Gold	Abdul Halim Mohamad	Swimming	Men's 100 m breaststroke SB8	1 August
Gold	Muhammad Imaan Aiman Muhammad Redzuan	Swimming	Men's 50 m backstroke S14	1 August
Gold	Lim Carmen	Swimming	Women's 100 m breaststroke SB8	1 August
Gold	Brenda Anellia Larry	Swimming	Women's 50 m backstroke S4	1 August
Gold	Abdul Latif Romly	Athletics	Men's long jump T20	2 August
Gold	Muhammad Saifuddin Ishak	Athletics	Men's long jump T11/12	2 August
Gold	Mohd Adib Iqbal Abdullah	Swimming	Men's 50 m breaststroke SB14	2 August
Gold	Muhammad Ashraf Muhammad Haisham	Athletics	Men's 1500 m T46	3 August
Gold	Ethan Yun Jun Khoo	Swimming	Men's 100 m freestyle S14	3 August
Gold	Fraidden Dawan	Swimming	Men's 100 m butterfly S10	3 August
Gold	Ethan Yun Jun Khoo	Swimming	Men's 200 m individual madley SM14	3 August
Gold	Muhammad Imaan Aiman Muhammad Redzuan	Swimming	Men's 100 m butterfly S14	3 August
Gold	Muhammad Ashraf Muhammad Haisham	Athletics	Men's 800 m T46	4 August
Gold	Ethan Yun Jun Khoo	Swimming	Men's 200 m freestyle S14	4 August
Gold	Zy Lee Kher	Swimming	Men's 200 m individual madley SM5	4 August
Gold	Muhammad Nur Syaiful Zulkafli	Swimming	Men's 50 m freestyle S5	4 August
Gold	Fraidden Dawan	Swimming	Men's 200 m individual madley SM10	4 August
Gold	Brenda Anellia Larry	Swimming	Women's 100 m breaststroke SB4	4 August
Gold	Wiro Julin; Daneshen Govinda Rajan	Archery	Men's doubles team compound	5 August
Gold	Daneshen Govinda Rajan; Nur Jannaton Abdul Jalil	Archery	Mixed team compound	5 August
Gold	Cheah Liek Hou	Badminton	Men's singles SU5	5 August
Gold	Muhammad Ikhwan Ramli	Badminton	Men's singles WH1	5 August
Gold	Muhammad Ikhwan Ramli; Noor Azwan Noorlan	Badminton	Men's doubles WH1/WH2	5 August
Gold	Muhammad Nur Syaiful Zulkafli	Swimming	Men's 100 m freestyle S5	5 August
Gold	Abdul Halim Mohamad	Swimming	Men's 50 m breaststroke SB8	5 August
Gold	Bryan Junency Gustin	Powerlifting	Men's Up to 80 kg-total lift	5 August
Gold	Nicodemus Manggoi Moses	Powerlifting	Men's Up to 88 kg-best lift	5 August
Gold	Nicodemus Manggoi Moses	Powerlifting	Men's Up to 88 kg-total lift	5 August
Gold	Jennahtul Fahmi Ahmad Jennah	Table tennis	Men's singles T11	5 August
Gold	Abu Samah Borhan; Mohamad Yusshazwan Yusoff	Wheelchair tennis	Men's doubles C7	5 August
Silver	Mohamad Aliff Mohamad Awi	Athletics	Men's shot put F20	1 August
Silver	Muhammad Amirul Arif Abdul Raof	Athletics	Men's shot put F53-55	1 August
Silver	Lim Carmen	Swimming	Women's 100 m freestyle SB8	1 August
Silver	Zulkifly Abdullah	Athletics	Men's long jump T20	2 August
Silver	Mohamad Ridzuan Mohamad Puzi	Athletics	Men's 200 m T35/36	2 August
Silver	Muhammad Nurdin Ibrahim	Athletics	Men's 1500 m T20	2 August
Silver	Muhammad Ashraf Muhammad Haisham	Athletics	Men's 5000 m T46	2 August
Silver	Eddy Bernard	Athletics	Men's 100 m T44/62/64	2 August
Silver	Nur Alia Ardiela Natasya Ibrahim	Athletics	Women's long jump T20	2 August
Silver	Muhammad Nur Syaiful Zulkafli	Swimming	Men's 200 m freestyle -S5	2 August
Silver	Muhammad Imaan Aiman Muhammad Redzuan	Swimming	Men's 100 m backstroke S14	2 August
Silver	Mohd Adib Iqbal Abdullah	Swimming	Men's 200 m individual madley SM14	3 August
Silver	Daneshen Govinda Rajan	Archery	Men's individual compound open	4 August
Silver	Muhammad Faiz Haizat Rosdi	Athletics	Men's 800 m T37/38	4 August
Silver	Mohamad Yusshazwan Yusoff	Wheelchair tennis	Men's singles C7	4 August
Silver	Mohamad Faris Ahmad Azri	Badminton	Men's singles SU5	5 August
Silver	Bryan Junency Gustin	Powerlifting	Men's Up to 80 kg-best lift	5 August
Silver	Wan Nur Azri Wan Azman	Powerlifting	Men's Up to 97 kg-best lift	5 August
Silver	Lim Carmen	Swimming	Women's 50 m freestyle S8	5 August
Silver	Mohd Hazlin Abdullah	Table tennis	Men's singles T11	5 August
Bronze	Muhammad Faiz Haizat Rosdi	Athletics	Men's 1500 m T37/38	2 August
Bronze	Suresh Selvatamby; Nurfaizal Hamzah	Archery	Men's doubles team recurve	3 August
Bronze	Nasharuddin Mohd	Athletics	Men's 400 m T20	3 August
Bronze	Faizatul Ahya Abdullah Thani	Wheelchair tennis	Women's singles C7	3 August
Bronze	Muhammad Nurdin Ibrahim	Athletics	Men's 800 m T20	4 August
Bronze	Mohd Amin Burhanuddin	Badminton	Men's singles SL4	4 August
Bronze	Noor Azwan Noorlan	Badminton	Men's singles WH2	4 August
Bronze	Cheah Liek Hou; Muhammad Fareez Anuar	Badminton	Men's doubles SU5	4 August
Bronze	Mohamad Faris Ahmad Azri; Mohd Amin Burhanuddin	Badminton	Men's doubles SU5	4 August
Bronze	Sona Agon	Powerlifting	Women's Up to 73 kg-best lift	4 August
Bronze	Sona Agon	Powerlifting	Women's Up to 73 kg-total lift	4 August
Bronze	Abu Samah Borhan	Wheelchair tennis	Men's singles C7	4 August
Bronze	Malaysian goalball team	Goalball	Men's team	5 August
Bronze	Wan Nur Azri Wan Azman	Powerlifting	Men's Up to 97 kg-total lift	5 August

== Competitors ==
Sport	Men	Women	Total
Archery	4	1	5
Athletics	16	2	18
Badminton	6	0	6
Boccia	1	0	1
Chess	2	2	4
Goalball	6	0	6
Powerlifing	3	1	4
Sitting volleyball	12	0	12
Swimming	8	2	10
Table tennis	3	0	3
Wheelchair tennis	3	1	4
Total	64	9	73

== Goalball ==
Team	Event	Round robin							Semifinals	Final / BM	
Team	Event	Oppositions Scores	Oppositions Scores	Oppositions Scores	Oppositions Scores	Oppositions Scores	Oppositions Scores	Rank	Opposition Score	Opposition Score	Rank
Malaysia men's	Men's tournament	Cambodia; W 10–0	Thailand; L 2–12	Philippines; W 19–9	Indonesia; L 6–11	Laos; W 14–4	Myanmar; W 20–10	3	Indonesia; L 2–12	Laos; W 18–8	3rd place, bronze medalist(s)

Squad

- Badrul Hisam Musa
- Mohamad Firdaus Ngatiman
- Muhammad Amirul Ahmad
- Muhammad Haiqal Azani Azman
- Muhammad Noorhelmie Mohd Rabi
- Partiban Perumal

== Sitting volleyball ==
Team	Event	Group Stage		Semifinals / Pl.	Final / BM / Pl.	
Team	Event	Opposition Score	Rank	Opposition Score	Opposition Score	Rank
Malaysia men's	Men's tournament	Thailand; L 0–3 Indonesia; L 0–3	3	Did not advance		

Squad

- Arif Ridzuan Ab Nasir
- Mohd Shaharudin Abd Karim
- Muhammad Shahrul Irfan Abd Razak
- Harman Halion
- Fakri Raimi Razak
- Fadzan Mat Isa
- Yuvarajah Thijagarajah
- Mohd Shahmil Md Saad
- Muhammad Nazrul Sabtu
- Amir Safuan Wahab
- Muhammad Syahril Abd Hamid
