= Indonesia at the 2022 ASEAN Para Games =

- IPC code: INA
- NPC: National Paralympic Committee of Indonesia
- Website: www.npcindonesia.org (in Indonesian)

in Surakarta
- Medals Ranked 1st: Gold 175 Silver 144 Bronze 107 Total 426

ASEAN Para Games appearances (overview)
- 2001; 2003; 2005; 2008; 2009; 2011; 2013; 2015; 2017; 2020; 2022; 2023

Indonesia competed at the 2022 ASEAN Para Games in Surakarta, Indonesia. Originally scheduled to take place in 2021, the Games were planned amidst the COVID-19 pandemic in Vietnam, posing logistical challenges in organizing the event.

Originally scheduled to be held from 17 to 23 December 2021, the Games were cancelled in October 2021 after the 2021 Southeast Asian Games was postponed to May 2022 due to the pandemic.

== Medal summary ==
=== Medal by sport ===
Medals by sport
Sport	1st place, gold medalist(s)	2nd place, silver medalist(s)	3rd place, bronze medalist(s)	Total	Rank
Athletics	61	47	21	129	1
Swimming	29	31	27	87	1
Table tennis	27	16	22	65	1
Powerlifting	18	6	0	24	1
Chess	13	19	8	40	1
Badminton	13	9	8	30	1
Blind Judo	9	5	3	17	1
Archery	3	3	4	10	2
Boccia	1	4	6	9	2
Sitting Volleyball	1	0	1	2	1
Wheelchair Tennis	0	2	4	6	3
Goalball	0	1	1	2	2
Cerebal Palsy Football	0	1	0	1	2
Wheelchair Basketball	0	0	2	2	4
Total	175	144	107	426	1

=== Medal by date ===
Medals by date
Day	Date	1st place, gold medalist(s)	2nd place, silver medalist(s)	3rd place, bronze medalist(s)	Total
0	30 July	Opening Ceremony			
1	31 July	1	0	1	2
2	1 August	29	22	8	59
3	2 August	6	4	3	13
4	3 August	57	40	38	135
5	4 August	26	14	16	56
6	5 August	56	64	41	161
7	6 August	Closing Ceremony			
Total		175	144	107	426

=== Medalists ===
Medal	Name	Sport	Event	Date
Gold	Suryo Nugroho; Fredy Setiawan; Hafiz Brilliansyah; Ukun Rukaendi; Dheva Anrimusthi; Hary Susanto	Badminton	Men's team	31 July
Gold	Ansyari	Athletics	Men's Javelin Throw F40/41	1 August
Gold	Aris Wibawa	Swimming	Men's 100 m breaststroke sb7	1 August
Gold	Tangkilisan Steven Sualang	Swimming	Men's 50 m backstroke s10	1 August
Gold	Rino Saputra	Swimming	Men's 100 m freestyle s9	1 August
Gold	Zaki Zulkarnain	Swimming	Men's 100 m freestyle s8	1 August
Gold	Meliana Ratih Pratama	Swimming	Women's 50 m backstroke s14	1 August
Gold	Jendi Pangabean	Swimming	Men's 4 × 100 m freestyle relay 34 pts	1 August
Gold	Menaser Meriba Numberi	Swimming	Men's 4 × 100 m medley relay 49 pts	1 August
Gold	Eneng Paridah	Powerlifting	Women's up to 41 kg(best)	1 August
Gold	Eneng Paridah	Powerlifting	Women's up to 41 kg(total)	1 August
Gold	Ni Nengah Widiasih	Powerlifting	Women's up to 45 kg(best)	1 August
Gold	Ni Nengah Widiasih	Powerlifting	Women's up to 45 kg(total)	1 August
Gold	Rani Puji Astuti	Powerlifting	Women's up to 61 kg(best)	1 August
Gold	Mohamad Rian Prahasta; Banyu Tri Mulyo	Table tennis	Men's team class 8	1 August
Gold	Komet Akbar; David Yakob	Table tennis	Men's team class 10	1 August
Gold	Kusnanto; Supriatna Gumilar; Hilmi Hazizi; Aman Suratman	Table tennis	Men's team class 9	1 August
Gold	Adyos Astan; Yayang Gunaya	Table tennis	Men's team class 4	1 August
Gold	Hamidah; Suwarti	Table tennis	Women's team class 8	1 August
Gold	Sella Dwi Radayana; Jeje Juliyani; Aminah	Table tennis	Women's team class 10	1 August
Gold	Firza Faturahman	Athletics	Men's 100 m T45/46	1 August
Gold	Karisma Evi Tiarani	Athletics	Women's 100 m t42/44	1 August
Gold	Warmia	Athletics	Women's javelin throw f42	1 August
Gold	Marcelino Michael	Athletics	Men's shot put f12	1 August
Gold	Saptoyogo Purnomo	Athletics	Men's 100 m t37	1 August
Gold	Ni Made Arianti	Athletics	Women's 100 m t12	1 August
Gold	Nanda Mei Sholihah	Athletics	Women's 100 m t46/57	1 August
Gold	Putri Aulia	Athletics	Women's 100 m t13	1 August
Gold	Nur Ferry Pradana	Athletics	Men's 100 m t47	1 August
Gold	Felix Silau	Athletics	Men's discus throw f35-37	1 August
Gold	Fajar Nur Hadianto	Swimming	Men's 50 m breaststroke sb4	2 August
Gold	Syuci Indriani	Swimming	Women's 50 m butterfly s14	2 August
Gold	Fatur Rizky M Daniel Nugroho W Aldi Tri Septian; M Tauhidi Fatahillah	Swimming	Men's 4 × 100 m medley relay s14	2 August
Gold	Bayu Pangestu Aji	Blind Judo	Men's j2 -60kg	2 August
Gold	Rafli Ahnaf Shidqi	Blind Judo	Men's j1 -73kg	2 August
Gold	Sahrul Suhaiman	Blind Judo	Men's j2 -73kg	2 August
Gold	INDONESIA	Chess	Men's team pi	3 August
Gold	INDONESIA	Chess	Women's team pi	3 August
Gold	Indra Yoga	Chess	Men's individual standard chess vi-b1	3 August
Gold	Puspita Tita	Chess	Women's individual standard chess vi-b1	3 August
Gold	Eko Saputro	Athletics	Men's 100 m T12	3 August
Gold	Eko Saputro	Athletics	Men's 200 m T12	3 August
Gold	Endi Nurdin Tine	Athletics	Men's 1500 T20	3 August
Gold	Figo Saputra	Athletics	Men's 200 m T46	3 August
Gold	Nur Ferry Pradana	Athletics	Men's 200 m T47	3 August
Gold	Slamet Wahyu Jati	Athletics	Men's 1500 m T11-13	3 August
Gold	Jaenal Aripin	Athletics	Men's 200 m T54	3 August
Gold	Saptoyogo Purnomo	Athletics	Men's 200 m T36/37	3 August
Gold	Maria Goreti Samiyati	Athletics	Women's 200 m T54	3 August
Gold	Nanda Mei Sholihah	Athletics	Women's 200 m T46/57	3 August
Gold	Putri Aulia	Athletics	Women's 200 m T13	3 August
Gold	Tiwa	Athletics	Women's 1500 m T20	3 August
Gold	Ni Made Arianti	Athletics	Women's 200 m T12	3 August
Gold	Karisma Evi Tiarani	Athletics	Women's 200 m T44/64	3 August
Gold	Setiawan	Archery	Men's individual recurve open	3 August
Gold	Wahyu Retno Wulandari; Mahda Aulia	Archery	Women's double team recurve	3 August
Gold	Kholidin; Setiawan	Archery	Men's double team recurve	3 August
Gold	Tangkilisan Steven Sualang	Swimming	Men's 100 m backstroke s10	3 August
Gold	Rino Saputra; Guntur; Jendi Pangabean; Zaki Zulkarnain	Swimming	Men's 4 × 100 m medley relay 34 pts	3 August
Gold	Maulana Rifky Yavianda	Swimming	Men's 100 m freestyle s12	3 August
Gold	Jendi Pangabean	Swimming	Men's 100 m backstroke s9	3 August
Gold	Jendi Pangabean	Swimming	Men's 100 m butterfly s9	3 August
Gold	Mutiara Cantik Harsanto	Swimming	Women's 100 m butterfly s9	3 August
Gold	Wening Prabawati	Boccia	Female individual-bc4	3 August
Gold	Fajar Pambudi	Blind Judo	Men's j1&j2 -90kg	3 August
Gold	Tony Ricardo Mantolas	Blind Judo	Men's j1&j2 +90kg	3 August
Gold	Balgis Mega Maghfira	Blind Judo	Women's j1&j2 +57kg	3 August
Gold	Gian Nita Almira Rusmanto	Blind Judo	Women's j1&j2 -57kg	3 August
Gold	Sunarto; Tatok Hardiyanto	Table tennis	Men's doubles class 5	3 August
Gold	Mohamad Rian Prahasta; Banyu Tri Mulyo	Table tennis	Men's doubles class 8	3 August
Gold	Kusnanto; Supriyatna Gumilar	Table tennis	Men's doubles class 9	3 August
Gold	Komet Akbar; David Jacobs	Table tennis	Men's doubles class 10	3 August
Gold	Suwarti	Table tennis	Women's singles class 8	3 August
Gold	Siti Fadillah	Table tennis	Women's singles class 6-7	3 August
Gold	Hamidah; Suwarti	Table tennis	Women's doubles class 8	3 August
Gold	Imas Yuniar; Hana Resti	Table tennis	Women's doubles class 9	3 August
Gold	Sella Dwi Radayana; Cici Juliani	Table tennis	Women's doubles class 10	3 August
Gold	Tatok Hardiyanto; Leli Marlina	Table tennis	Mixed doubles class 5	3 August
Gold	Rian Prahasta; Suwarti	Table tennis	Mixed doubles class 8	3 August
Gold		Table tennis	Mixed doubles class 9	3 August
Gold		Table tennis	Mixed doubles class 10	3 August
Gold	Alan Sastra Ginting	Athletics	Men's discus throw f57	3 August
Gold	Fauzi Purwolaksono	Athletics	Men's shot put f57	3 August
Gold	Setyo Budi Hartanto	Athletics	Men's triple jump f47	3 August
Gold	Yohanes Bili	Athletics	Men's javelin throw f44/46/64	3 August
Gold	Elvin Elhudia Sesa	Athletics	Women's 400 m t20	3 August
Gold	Maria Wilil	Athletics	Women's javelin throw f46	3 August
Gold	Nia Meliani Usnia	Athletics	Women's discus throw f11-13	3 August
Gold	Nia Meliani Usnia	Athletics	Women's javelin throw f11-13	3 August
Gold	Nia Meliani Usnia	Athletics	Women's shot put f11-13	3 August
Gold	Putri Aulia	Athletics	Women's long jump f13	3 August
Gold	Rica Oktavia	Athletics	Women's long jump f20	3 August
Gold	Warmia	Athletics	Women's discus throw f42/44	3 August
Gold	Ahmad Azwari	Swimming	Men's 50 m butterfly s9	4 August
Gold	Bayu Putra Yuda	Swimming	Men's 50 m butterfly s10	4 August
Gold	Zaki Zulkarnain	Swimming	Men's 200 m individual medley sm8	4 August
Gold	Jendi Pangabean	Swimming	Men's 200 m individual medley sm9	4 August
Gold	Maulana Rifky Yavianda; Marinus Melianus Yowei; Muh Azmin T An Nawwaar; Sunarto	Swimming	Men's 4 × 100 m freestyle relay 49 pts	4 August
Gold	Santi Apriliani; Diah Dwiyanti; Sudartatik; Dina Rulina; Katerina Dewi Putri Kristianti; Ratifah Apriyanti; Sri Lestari; Anissa Tindy	Sitting Volleyball	Women's team	4 August
Gold	INDONESIA	Blind Judo	Men's team	4 August
Gold	INDONESIA	Blind Judo	Women's team	4 August
Gold	Ni Nengah Widiasih	Powerlifting	Women's up to 86 kg(best)	4 August
Gold	Ni Nengah Widiasih	Powerlifting	Women's up to 86 kg(total)	4 August
Gold	Nurtani Purba	Powerlifting	Women's up to 73 kg(best)	4 August
Gold	Nurtani Purba	Powerlifting	Women's up to 73 kg(total)	4 August
Gold	Shebrioni	Powerlifting	Women's up to 67 kg(best)	4 August
Gold	Shebrioni	Powerlifting	Women's up to 67 kg(total)	4 August
Gold	Siti Mahmudah	Powerlifting	Women's up to 79 kg(best)	4 August
Gold	Siti Mahmudah	Powerlifting	Women's up to 79 kg(total)	4 August
Gold	Sriyanti	Powerlifting	Women's over to 86 kg(best)	4 August
Gold	Sriyanti	Powerlifting	Women's over to 86 kg(total)	4 August
Gold	Rina Marlina	Badminton	Women's singles sh6	4 August
Gold	Warining Rahayu	Badminton	Women's singles su5	4 August
Gold	Subhan; Rina Marlina	Badminton	Mixed Doubles sh6	4 August
Gold	Fredy Setiawan; Khalimatus Sadiyah	Badminton	Mixed Doubles sh6	4 August
Gold	INDONESIA	Chess	Men's team rapid chess vi-b2/3	4 August
Gold	INDONESIA	Chess	Women's team rapid chess b1	4 August
Gold	Gayuh Satrio	Chess	Men's individual rapid chess b2/3	4 August
Gold	Wilma Margaretha Sinaga	Chess	Women's individual rapid chess b1	4 August
Gold	Marinus Melianus Yowei	Swimming	Men's 50 m breaststroke sb13	5 August
Gold	Aris Wibawa	Swimming	Men's 50 m breaststroke sb7	5 August
Gold	Zaki Zulkarnain	Swimming	Men's 50 m freestyle s8	5 August
Gold	Rino Saputra	Swimming	Men's 50 m freestyle s9	5 August
Gold	Maulana Rifky Yavianda	Swimming	Men's 50 m breaststroke sb12	5 August
Gold	Maulana Rifky Yavianda	Swimming	Men's 50 m freestyle s12	5 August
Gold	Tara Athaya Yasykur	Swimming	Women's 50 m freestyle s12	5 August
Gold	M Tauhidi Fatahillah; Fathur Rizky Moreno; Syuci Indriani; Meliana Ratih Pratama	Swimming	Mixed 4 × 100 m freestyle relay s14	5 August
Gold	Subhan	Badminton	Men's singles sh6	5 August
Gold	Ukun Rukaendi	Badminton	Men's singles sl3	5 August
Gold	Fredy Setiawan	Badminton	Men's singles sl4	5 August
Gold	Wiwin Adri	Badminton	Men's singles wh2	5 August
Gold	Dwiyoko; Fredy Setiawan	Badminton	Men's doubles sl3-sl4	5 August
Gold	Dheva Anrimusthi; Hafizh Briliansyah Prawiranegara	Badminton	Men's doubles su5	5 August
Gold	Khalimatus Sadiyah	Badminton	Women's singles sl4	5 August
Gold	Qonitah Ikhtiar; Warining Rahayu	Badminton	Women's doubles sl3-su5	5 August
Gold	Atmaji Priambodo	Powerlifting	Men's up to 97 kg - best lift	5 August
Gold	Atmaji Priambodo	Powerlifting	Men's up to 97 kg - total	5 August
Gold	Tambi Sibarani	Powerlifting	Men's up to 80 kg - best lift	5 August
Gold	Tatok Hardiyanto	Table Tennis	Men's singles - class 5	5 August
Gold	Mohamad Rian Prahasta	Table Tennis	Men's singles - class 8	5 August
Gold	Kusnanto	Table Tennis	Men's singles - class 9	5 August
Gold	David Jacobs	Table Tennis	Men's singles - class 10	5 August
Gold	Leli Marlina	Table Tennis	Women's singles - class 5	5 August
Gold	Hana Resti	Table Tennis	Women's singles - class 9	5 August
Gold	Sella Dwi Radayana	Table Tennis	Women's singles - class 10	5 August
Gold	Ana Widyasari	Table Tennis	Women's singles - class 11	5 August
Gold	Maksum Firdaus	Chess	Men's individual blitz chess pi	5 August
Gold	Prasetio Fitrianto	Chess	Men's individual blitz chess b1	5 August
Gold	Wilma Margaretha Sinaga	Chess	Women's individual blitz chess b1	5 August
Gold	Indonesia	Chess	Men's team blitz chess pi	5 August
Gold	Indonesia	Chess	Men's team blitz chess b1	5 August
Silver	Karisma Evi Tiarani	Athletics	Women's Long Jump T42/44/64	1 August
Silver	Rizal Bagus	Athletics	Men's 100 m t47	1 August
Silver	Sriwati Kamariah	Athletics	Women's shot put f57	1 August
Silver	Ahmad Fauzi	Athletics	Men's discus throw f35-37	1 August
Silver	Ryan Arda Diarta	Athletics	Men's long jump f44/64	1 August
Silver	Dwi Oktaviyani	Athletics	Women's discus throw f55	1 August
Silver	Guntur	Swimming	Men's 100 m breaststroke sb8	1 August
Silver	Bayu Putra Yuda	Swimming	Men's 100 m breaststroke sb9	1 August
Silver	Nor Aimah	Swimming	Women's 100 m breaststroke sb8	1 August
Silver	Nor Aimah	Swimming	Women's 100 m freestyle s7	1 August
Silver	Mutiara Cantik Harsanto	Swimming	Women's 100 m breaststroke sb9	1 August
Silver	Suriansyah	Swimming	Men's 100 m freestyle s7	1 August
Silver	Tara Athaya Yaskur	Swimming	Women's 100 m breaststroke sb12	1 August
Silver	Sapia Rumbaru	Swimming	Women's 100 m freestyle s10	1 August
Silver	Marlanda Oropa	Swimming	Women's 50 m backstroke s14	1 August
Silver	Rani Puji Astuti	Powerlifting	Women's up to 61 kg(total)	1 August
Silver	Abdul Hadi	Powerlifting	Men's up to 49 kg(best)	1 August
Silver	Abdul Hadi	Powerlifting	Men's up to 49 kg(total)	1 August
Silver	Kusrita; Idayani	Table tennis	Women's team class 1-3	1 August
Silver	Farli Jerikutilaar; Rahmad Hidayat; Enceng Mustofa; Ajang Zaenal Abidin	Table tennis	Men's team class 6-7	1 August
Silver	Tatok Hardiyanto; Sunarto; Barce Instinlayaba	Table tennis	Men's team class 5	1 August
Silver	Audy Ngangi; Andi Santoso; Sefriyanta; Cahya Pembudi	Table tennis	Men's team class 1-3	1 August
Silver	Aldi Tri Septian	Swimming	Men's 50 m butterfly s14	2 August
Silver	Meliana Ratih Pratama	Swimming	Women's 50 m butterfly s14	2 August
Silver	Agung Gondolimo	Blind Judo	Men's j2 -73kg	2 August
Silver	Junaedi	Blind Judo	Men's j1 -60kg	2 August
Silver	INDONESIA	Chess	Men's team pi	3 August
Silver	INDONESIA	Chess	Men's team pi/2	3 August
Silver	INDONESIA	Chess	Women's team pi p2 p3	3 August
Silver	Tirto	Chess	Men's individual standard chess pi	3 August
Silver	Aisah Wijayanti Putri Brahmana	Chess	Women's individual standard chess vi-b2/3	3 August
Silver	Ruli Alkahfi Mubarok	Athletics	Men's 100 m t11	3 August
Silver	Rizal Bagus	Athletics	Men's 200 m t47	3 August
Silver	Muammar Habibila	Athletics	Men's 200 m t13	3 August
Silver	Firza Fathurahman	Athletics	Men's 200 m t46	3 August
Silver	Susan Ungu	Athletics	Women's 100 m t11	3 August
Silver	Insan Hurhaida	Athletics	Women's 200 t36/37	3 August
Silver	Susan Ungu	Athletics	Women's 200 m t11	3 August
Silver	Kholidin; Mahda Aulia	Archery	Mixed team recurve	3 August
Silver	Mahda Aulia	Archery	Women's individual recurve open	3 August
Silver	Rahmat Tulloh	Swimming	Men's 100 m butterfly s10	3 August
Silver	Daniel Nugroho Wijayanto	Swimming	Men's 100 m butterfly s14	3 August
Silver	Sapia Rumbaru; Nor Aimah; Mutiara Cantik Harsanto; Ina Prihati Nur Islami	Swimming	Women's 4 × 100 m medley relay 34 pts	3 August
Silver	Tiara Hanum Kembang Joyo	Swimming	Women's 100 m butterfly s9	3 August
Silver	Syuci Indriani	Swimming	Women's 100 m freestyle s14	3 August
Silver	Mutiara Cantik Harsanto	Swimming	Women's 100 m backstroke s9	3 August
Silver	Gischa Zayana	Boccia	Female individual-bc2	3 August
Silver	Handayani	Boccia	Female individual-bc1	3 August
Silver	Junifor Bate'E	Blind Judo	Men's j1&j2 -90kg	3 August
Silver	Melinda Artia Garini	Blind Judo	Women's j1&j2 -57kg	3 August
Silver	Roma Siska	Blind Judo	Women's j1&j2 +57kg	3 August
Silver	Rahmat Hidayat	Table tennis	Men's singles class 6	3 August
Silver		Table tennis	Men's doubles class 4	3 August
Silver	Ajang Zainal Abidin; Varly Jerico Tilaar	Table tennis	Men's doubles class 6-7	3 August
Silver	Hilmi Azizi; Aman Suratman	Table tennis	Men's doubles class 9	3 August
Silver	Tarsilem; Leli Marlina	Table tennis	Women's doubles class 5	3 August
Silver	E.Mustopa; Siti Fadillah	Table tennis	Mixed doubles class 6-7	3 August
Silver	Banyu Tri Mulyo; Hamidah	Table tennis	Mixed doubles class 8	3 August
Silver		Table tennis	Mixed doubles class 9	3 August
Silver	Dapiel Bayage	Athletics	Men's javelin throw f42	3 August
Silver	Fauzi Purwolaksono	Athletics	Men's discus throw f57	3 August
Silver	Mulyono	Athletics	Men's long jump f42	3 August
Silver	Famini	Athletics	Women's javelin field f56	3 August
Silver	Siti Nuraisyah Asikin	Athletics	Women's discus throw f11-13	3 August
Silver	Siti Nuraisyah Asikin	Athletics	Women's shot put f11-13	3 August
Silver	Tiwa	Athletics	Women's 400 m t20	3 August
Silver	Simson Abraham Situmorang	Swimming	Men's 100 m breaststroke sb4	4 August
Silver	Muhd Gerry Pahker	Swimming	Men's 100 m breaststroke sb6	4 August
Silver	Bayu Putra Yuda	Swimming	Men's 200 m individual medley sm10	4 August
Silver	Meliana Ratih Pratama	Swimming	Women's 200 m freestyle s14	4 August
Silver	Riyanti	Swimming	Women's 100 m breaststroke sb6	4 August
Silver	Riyanti	Swimming	Women's 50 m freestyle s6	4 August
Silver	Nor Aimah	Swimming	Women's 50 m freestyle s7	4 August
Silver	Adji Hartono	Chess	Men's individual rapid chess pi	4 August
Silver	Prasetio Fitrianto	Chess	Men's individual rapid chess b1	4 August
Silver	Ade R.Nasution	Chess	Women's individual rapid chess pi	4 August
Silver	INDONESIA	Chess	Men's team rapid chess pi	4 August
Silver	INDONESIA	Chess	Men's team rapid chess b1	4 August
Silver	INDONESIA	Chess	Women's team rapid chess pi	4 August
Silver	INDONESIA	Chess	Women's team rapid chess b1	4 August
Silver	Guntur	Swimming	Men's 50 m breaststroke sb8	5 August
Silver	Ahmad Azwari	Swimming	Men's 50 m freestyle s9	5 August
Silver	Muh Azwin T An Nawwar	Swimming	Men's 50 m freestyle s12	5 August
Silver	Riyanti	Swimming	Women's 100 m freestyle s6	5 August
Silver	Sapia Rumbaru	Swimming	Women's 50 m freestyle s10	5 August
Silver	Syuci Indriani	Swimming	Women's 50 m freestyle s14	5 August
Silver	Mutiara Cantik Harsanto; Nor Aimah; Riyanti; Sapia Rumbaru	Swimming	Women's 4 × 100 m freestyle relay 34 point	5 August
Silver	Indonesia	Cerebal Palsy Football	Men's team	5 August
Silver	Tuwariyah; Irma Yunita	Archery	Women's doubles team compound	5 August
Silver	Dimas Tri Aji	Badminton	Men's singles sh6	5 August
Silver	Maman Nurjaman	Badminton	Men's singles sl3	5 August
Silver	Hikmat Ramdani	Badminton	Men's singles sl4	5 August
Silver	Agus Budi Utomo	Badminton	Men's singles wh2	5 August
Silver	Hary Susanto; Ukun Rukaendi	Badminton	Men's doubles sl3-sl4	5 August
Silver	Oddie Listyanto Putra; Suryo Nugroho	Badminton	Men's doubles su5	5 August
Silver	Agung Widodo; Supriadi	Badminton	Men's doubles wh1-wh2	5 August
Silver	Lia Priyanti	Badminton	Women's singles sl4	5 August
Silver	Khalimatus Sadiyah; Lia Priyanti	Badminton	Women's doubles sl3-su5	5 August
Silver	Indonesia	Goalball	Men's team	5 August
Silver	Fendy Kurnia Pamungkas; Wening Prabawati	Boccia	Mixed pair bc4	5 August
Silver	Felix Ardi Yudha; M Bintang Satria Herlangga; Handayani	Boccia	Mixed team bc1/bc2	5 August
Silver	Tambi Sibarani	Powerlifting	Men's up to 80 kg - total	5 August
Silver	Andika Eka Jaya	Powerlifting	Men's up to 88 kg - best lift	5 August
Silver	Andika Eka Jaya	Powerlifting	Men's up to 88 kg - total	5 August
Silver	Adyos Astan	Table Tennis	Men's singles - class 4	5 August
Silver	Komet Akbar	Table Tennis	Men's singles - class 10	5 August
Silver	Imas Yuniar	Table Tennis	Women's singles - class 9	5 August
Silver	Indonesia	Table Tennis	Mixed doubles - class 10	5 August
Silver	Ndaru Patma Putri	Wheelchair Tennis	Women's singles	5 August
Silver	Kevin Sanjaya; Agus Fitriadi	Wheelchair Tennis	Men's doubles	5 August
Silver	Gayuh Satrio	Chess	Men's individual blitz chess b2/3	5 August
Silver	Ade R Nasution	Chess	Women's individual blitz chess pi	5 August
Silver	Aisah Wijayanti Putri Brahmana	Chess	Women's individual blitz chess vi-b2/3	5 August
Silver	Indonesia	Chess	Men's team blitz chess vi-b2/3	5 August
Silver	Indonesia	Chess	Women's team blitz chess pi	5 August
Silver	Indonesia	Chess	Women's team blitz chess b1	5 August
Silver	Indonesia	Chess	Women's team blitz chess vi-b2/3	5 August
Bronze	Kasep Ayatullah; Denih; Danu Kuswantoro; Ivo Shadan; I Komang Suparta	Wheelchair basketball	Men's 3-on-3	31 July
Bronze	Suriansyah	Swimming	Men's 400 m freestyle s7	1 August
Bronze	Prihati Nur Islami	Swimming	Women's 100 m freestyle s7	1 August
Bronze	Ummu Kalsum	Swimming	Women's 100 m breaststroke sb9	1 August
Bronze	Handoyo	Swimming	Men's 100 m freestyle s7	1 August
Bronze	Marinus Melianus Yowei	Swimming	Men's 100 m breaststroke sb13	1 August
Bronze	Ummu Kalsum	Swimming	Women's 100 m freestyle s9	1 August
Bronze	Fathur Rizky Moreno	Swimming	Men's 50 m backstroke s14	1 August
Bronze	Helin Wardina	Athletics	Women's 100 m t42/44	1 August
Bronze	Mulyadi	Swimming	Men's 50 m breaststroke sb5	1 August
Bronze	Suriansyah	Swimming	Men's 100 m backstroke s7	1 August
Bronze	Prasetio Fitrianto	Chess	Men's individual standard chess vi-b1	3 August
Bronze	Wilma Margaretha Sinaga	Chess	Women's individual standard chess vi-b1	3 August
Bronze	Maksum Firdaus	Chess	Men's individual standard chess pi	3 August
Bronze	Nasrodin	Athletics	Men's 1500 m t20	3 August
Bronze	Erens Sabandar	Athletics	Men's 200 m t46	3 August
Bronze	Jaenal Aripin	Athletics	Men's 100 m t54	3 August
Bronze	Rifki Ahmad Soleh	Athletics	Men's 5000 m t46	3 August
Bronze	Nina Gusmita	Athletics	Women's 200 m t54	3 August
Bronze	Marni Natonis	Athletics	Women's 1500 m t20	3 August
Bronze	Kholidin	Archery	Men's individual recurve open	3 August
Bronze	Wahyu Retno Wulandari	Archery	Women's individual recurve open	3 August
Bronze	Aldi Tri Septian	Swimming	Men's 100 m butterfly s14	3 August
Bronze	Rino Saputra	Swimming	Men's 100 m backstroke s9	3 August
Bronze	Daniel Nugroho Wijayanto	Swimming	Men's 200 m individual medley sm14	3 August
Bronze	Felix Ardi Yudha	Boccia	Male individual-bc2	3 August
Bronze	Fendy Kurnia Pamungkas	Boccia	Male individual-bc4	3 August
Bronze	Muhamad Afrizal Syafa	Boccia	Male individual-bc1	3 August
Bronze	Rexus Ohee	Boccia	Male individual-bc3	3 August
Bronze	Febriyanti Vani Rahmadhani	Boccia	Female individual-bc2	3 August
Bronze	Suci Kirana Dewi	Boccia	Female individual-bc3	3 August
Bronze	Ranto Herli Imanuel Sambouw	Blind Judo	Men's j1&j2 -90kg	3 August
Bronze	Marialam Sihotang	Blind Judo	Women's j1&j2 -57kg	3 August
Bronze	Novia Larassati	Blind Judo	Women's j1&j2 -57kg	3 August
Bronze	Audy Ngangi	Table tennis	Men's singles class 1-2	3 August
Bronze	Varly Jerico Tilaar	Table tennis	Men's singles class 6	3 August
Bronze	Sefrianto Yosep; Cahyo Pambudi	Table tennis	Men's doubles class 1-3	3 August
Bronze	Audy Ngangi; Andi Santoso	Table tennis	Men's doubles class 1-3	3 August
Bronze	Barce Eynstend Layaba; Sofyan	Table tennis	Men's doubles class 5	3 August
Bronze	Hamidah	Table tennis	Women's singles class 8	3 August
Bronze	Ida Yany; Osrita Muslim	Table tennis	Women's doubles class 1-3	3 August
Bronze	Siti Fadillah; Aminah	Table tennis	Women's doubles class 10	3 August
Bronze	Alan Sastra Ginting	Athletics	Men's shot put f57	3 August
Bronze	Ansyari	Athletics	Men's shot put f40/41	3 August
Bronze	Rizal Bagus Saktyono	Athletics	Men's javelin throw f44/46/64	3 August
Bronze	Eka Rosa Hybrida	Athletics	Women's javelin f55	3 August
Bronze	Insan Hurhaida	Athletics	Women's 400 m t36/37	3 August
Bronze	Putri Maulina	Athletics	Women's discus throw f42/44	3 August
Bronze	Siti Nuraisyah Asikin	Athletics	Women's javelin throw f11-13	3 August
Bronze	Kevin Ode Natama	Swimming	Men's 200 m freestyle s14	4 August
Bronze	Tangkilisan Steven Sualang	Swimming	Men's 50 m butterfly s10	4 August
Bronze	Mulyadi	Swimming	Men's 100 m breaststroke sb5	4 August
Bronze	Simson Abraham Situmorong	Swimming	Men's 50 m freestyle s4	4 August
Bronze	Fajar Nur Hadianto	Swimming	Men's 50 m freestyle s5	4 August
Bronze	Handoyo	Swimming	Men's 50 m freestyle s7	4 August
Bronze	Siti Alfiah	Swimming	Women's 50 m freestyle s6	4 August
Bronze	Ina Prihati Nur Islami	Swimming	Women's 50 m freestyle s7	4 August
Bronze	Sumarmo; Nasrullah; Cahyana; Anton Hilman; Sukarno; Murdiyan; Nesa Kristiana; Purwadi	Sitting Volleyball	Men's team	4 August
Bronze	Yunia Widya Irianti	Badminton	Women's singles sh6	4 August
Bronze	Dimas Tri Aji; Yunia Widya Irianti	Badminton	Mixed Doubles sh6	4 August
Bronze	Khoirur Roziqin; Warining Rahayu	Badminton	Mixed Doubles sl3-su5	4 August
Bronze	Maksum Firdaus	Chess	Men's individual rapid chess pi	4 August
Bronze	Yadi Sopiyan	Chess	Men's individual rapid chess b1	4 August
Bronze	Aisah Wijayanti Putri Brahmana	Chess	Women's individual rapid chess vi-b2/3	4 August
Bronze	Yustina Halawa	Chess	Women's individual rapid chess b1	4 August
Bronze	Fajar Nur Hadianto	Swimming	Men's 100 m freestyle s5	5 August
Bronze	Sunarto	Swimming	Men's 50 m freestyle s11	5 August
Bronze	Marinus Melianus Yowei	Swimming	Men's 50 m freestyle s13	5 August
Bronze	M Tauhidi Fatahillah	Swimming	Men's 50 m freestyle s14	5 August
Bronze	Siti Alfiah	Swimming	Women's 100 m freestyle s6	5 August
Bronze	Firstania Kayla Amir	Swimming	Women's 50 m freestyle s12	5 August
Bronze	Indonesia	Wheelchair basketball	Men's 5×5 team	5 August
Bronze	Ken Swagumilang	Archery	Men's doubles individual compound open	5 August
Bronze	Muhamad Ali; Ken Swagumilang	Archery	Men's doubles team compound	5 August
Bronze	Bambang Usiyan Purwito	Badminton	Men's singles sl3	5 August
Bronze	Dheva Anrimusthi	Badminton	Men's singles su5	5 August
Bronze	Suryo Nugroho	Badminton	Men's singles su5	5 August
Bronze	Agung Widodo	Badminton	Men's singles wh1	5 August
Bronze	Supriadi	Badminton	Men's singles wh2	5 August
Bronze	Indonesia	Goalball	Women's team	5 August
Bronze	Cahyo Pambudi Yosep	Table Tennis	Men's singles - class 3	5 August
Bronze	Sunarto	Table Tennis	Men's singles - class 4	5 August
Bronze	Yayang Gunaya	Table Tennis	Men's singles - class 4	5 August
Bronze	Barce Eynstend Layaba	Table Tennis	Men's singles - class 5	5 August
Bronze	Enceng Mustopa	Table Tennis	Men's singles - class 7	5 August
Bronze	Banyu Tri Mulyo	Table Tennis	Men's singles - class 8	5 August
Bronze	Aman Suratman	Table Tennis	Men's singles - class 10	5 August
Bronze	Achmad Yusuf	Table Tennis	Men's singles - class 11	5 August
Bronze	Rahmad Hidayat; Enceng Mustopa	Table Tennis	Men's doubles - class 6-7	5 August
Bronze	Osrita Muslim	Table Tennis	Women's singles - class 3	5 August
Bronze	Cici Juliani	Table Tennis	Women's singles - class 10	5 August
Bronze	Metri	Table Tennis	Women's singles - class 11	5 August
Bronze	Sefrianto; Osrita Muslim	Table Tennis	Mixed doubles - class 1-3	5 August
Bronze	Cahyo Pambudi Yosep; Ida Yani	Table Tennis	Mixed doubles - class 1-3	5 August
Bronze	Madhusen	Wheelchair Tennis	Quad singles	5 August
Bronze	Nurdin	Wheelchair Tennis	Quad singles	5 August
Bronze	Siti Hanna Komala Sari	Wheelchair Tennis	Women's singles	5 August
Bronze	Fikkri Thoib; Daryoko	Wheelchair Tennis	Men's doubles	5 August
Bronze	Adji Hartono	Chess	Men's individual blitz chess b2/3	5 August

== Archery ==
In the 2022 ASEAN Para Games, the Indonesian archery team fielded 12 athletes.

MEN
Athlete	Event	Ranking round		Round of 16	Quarterfinals	Semifinals	Final	
Athlete	Event	Score	Seed	Opposition Score	Opposition Score	Opposition Score	Opposition Score	Rank
Ken Swagumilang	Compound	337	2	—N/a	Phromruethon Tanakhan (THA); W 137–135	Sakon Inkaew (THA); L 137–140	Comsan Singpirom (THA); W 139–136	3rd place, bronze medalist(s)
Muhammad Ayodya Putra	Compound	322	6	Phromruethon Tanakhan (THA); 138–138	—N/aDid not advance			
Muhammad Ali	Compound	320	7	Allan G.Campos (PHI); W 136–123	Daneshen Govinda Rajan (MAS); L 138–139	—N/aDid not advance		
Kholidin	Recurve	619	3	—N/a	Gorospe Michael (PHI); W 6–0	Hanreuchai Netsiri (THA); L 4–6	Suresh Selvatamby (MAS); W 6–2	3rd place, bronze medalist(s)
Setiawan	Recurve	602	4	—N/a		Suresh Selvatamby (MAS); W 6–4	Hanreuchai Netsiri (THA); W 6–2	1st place, gold medalist(s)
Sadikin	Recurve	565	7	Nurfaizal Bin Hamzah (MAS); W 6–0	Hanreuchai Netsiri (THA); L 0–6	—N/aDid not advence		
Kholidin/ Setiawan	Recurve	—N/a				Nurfaizal Bin Hamzah/ Suresh Selvatamby (MAS); W 6–2	Hanreuchai Netsiri/ Pornchai Phimthong (MAS); W 5–1	1st place, gold medalist(s)

WOMEN
Athlete	Event	Ranking round		Round of 16	Quarterfinals	Semifinals	Final	
Athlete	Event	Score	Seed	Opposition Score	Opposition Score	Opposition Score	Opposition Score	Rank
Tuwariyah	Compound	311	7	Rhomsalee Katemongkon (THA); W 133–126	Nur Syahidah Binte Alim (SGP); L 131–142	—N/aDid not advance		
Irma Yunita	Compound	309	8	Manangdang Dina (PHI); W 132–118	Praphaporn Homjanthuek (THA); L 129–136	—N/aDid not advance		
Walminah	Compound	288	10	Agustina Bantiloc (PHI); W 126–128	Sein Phawt (MYA); L 120–138	—N/aDid not advance		
Mahda Aulia	Recurve	557	2	—N/a		Tpat Chatyotsakorn (THA); W 6–0	Phattharaphon Pattawaeo (THA); L 2–6	2nd place, silver medalist(s)
Wahyu Retno Wulandari	Recurve	482	5	—N/a	Elizabeth Bayla (PHI); W 7–1	Phattaraphon Pattawaeo (THA); L 2–6	Tpat Chatyotsakorn (THA); W 6–4	3rd place, bronze medalist(s)
Sri Hartatik	Recurve	457	6	—N/a	Tpat Chatyotsakorn (THA); L 2–6	—N/aDid not advance		
Tuwariyah/ Irma Yunita	Compound	—N/a				Agustina Bantiloc/ Manangdang Dina (PHI); W 140–129	Phannibha Srathongmaew/ Praphaporn Homjanthuek (THA); L 154–155	2nd place, silver medalist(s)
Wahyu Retno Wulandari/ Mahda Aulia	Recurve	—N/a					Phattharaphon Pattawaeo/ Tpat Chatyotsakorn (THA); W 6–2	1st place, gold medalist(s)

MIXED
Athlete	Event	Ranking round		Round of 16	Quarterfinals	Semifinals	Final	
Athlete	Event	Score	Seed	Opposition Score	Opposition Score	Opposition Score	Opposition Score	Rank
Ken Swagumilang/ Irma Yunita	Compound	—N/a				Nur Jannaton Binti Abdul Jalil/ Daneshen Govinda Rajan (MAS); L 141–144	—N/aDid not advance	
Kholidin/ Mahda Aulia	Recurve	—N/a				Elizabeth Bayla/ William Cablog (PHI); W 6–0	Hanreuchai Netsiri/ Phattharaphon Pattawaeo (THA); L 3–5	—N/a

== Badminton ==
Men

Athlete	Event	Group Stage				Quarterfinal	Semifinal	Final	
Athlete	Event	Opposition Score	Opposition Score	Opposition Score	Rank	Opposition Score	Opposition Score	Opposition Score	Rank
Bambang Usiyan Purwito	Singles SL3	Suy Samnang (CAM); W (21–8, 21–4)	Mongkhon Bunsun (THA); L (13–21, 21–9, 17–21)	—N/a	2 Q	Singha Sangnil (THA); W (21–17, 21–6)	Ukun Rukaendi (INA); L (17–21, 21–13, 19–21)	Did not advance	3rd place, bronze medalist(s)
Maman Nurjaman	Singles SL3	Singha Sangnil (THA); W (21–8, 21–11)	Trinh Anh Tuan (VIE); W (21–13, 21–13)	—N/a	1 Q	Poloong Loc (VIE); W (21–5, 21–7)	Mongkhon Bunsun (THA); W (21–13, 19–21, 21–13)	Ukun Rukaendi (INA); L (19–21, 10–21)	2nd place, silver medalist(s)
Ukun Rukaendi	Singles SL3	Natthapol Chamnanwet (THA); W (21–10, 21–18)	Poloong Loc (VIE); W (21–14, 21–5)	—N/a	1 Q	—N/a	Bambang Usiyan Purwito (INA); W (21–17, 13–21, 21–19)	Maman Nurjaman (INA); W (21–19, 21–10)	1st place, gold medalist(s)
Fredy Setiawan	Singles SL4	Ta Truc (VIE); W (21–11, 21–4)	Chindanai Ninudomsak (THA); W (21–6, 21–5)	—N/a	1 Q	—N/a	Chawarat Kitichokwattana (THA); W (21–9, 21–10)	Hikmat Ramdani (INA); W (21–17, 21–19)	1st place, gold medalist(s)
Hikmat Ramdani	Singles SL4	Ang Chee Hiong (SGP); W (21–9, 21–9)	Siripong Teamarrom (THA); W (21–17, 21–15)	—N/a	1 Q	—N/a	Mohd Amin Burhanuddin (MAS); W (24–22, 21–18)	Fredy Setiawan (INA); L (17–21, 19–21)	2nd place, silver medalist(s)
Arya Sadewa	Singles SU5	Watcharaphon Chok-Uthaikul (THA); W (Walkover)	Cheah Liek Hou (MAS); L (5–21, 10–21)	—N/a	2 Q	Suryo Nugroho (INA); L (15–21, 10–21)	Did not advance		
Dheva Anrimusthi	Singles SU5	Joseph Clyde Belga (PHI); W (21–10, 21–10)	Thaweesap Natthapon (THA); W (Walkover)	Van Anh Tuan (VIE); W (21–9, 21–9)	1 Q	Pham Van Toi (VIE); W (21–16, 21–8)	Cheah Liek Hou (MAS); L (19–21, 12–21)	Did not advance	3rd place, bronze medalist(s)
Suryo Nugroho	Singles SU5	Bui Minh Hai (VIE); W (21–11, 21–13)	Muhammad Fareez Anuar (MAS); W (21–18, 21–7)	Pricha Somsiri (THA); W (Walkover)	1 Q	Arya Sadewa (INA); W (21–15, 21–10)	Mohamad Faris Ahmad Azri (MAS); L (11–21, 10–21)	Did not advance	3rd place, bronze medalist(s)
Agung Widodo	Singles WH1	Jestonie Rosalita (PHI); W (21–15, 21–12)	Anuwat Sriboran (THA); W (21–8, 21–8)	—N/a	1 Q	Hoang Manh Giang (VIE); W (21–9, 21–12)	Chatchai Kornpeekanok (THA); L (21–16, 9–21, 18–21)	Did not advance	3rd place, bronze medalist(s)
Agus Budi Utomo	Singles WH2	Maiwijit Kokakot (THA); W (21–4, 21–3)	Noor Azwan Noorlan (MAS); W (21–18, 21–18)	—N/a	1 Q	—N/a	Noor Azwan Noorlan (MAS); W (9–21, 21–12, 21–18)	Wiwin Adri (INA); L (13–21, 8–21)	2nd place, silver medalist(s)
Supriadi	Singles WH2	Joseph Asoque (PHI); W (21–3, 21–7)	Dumnern Junthong (THA); W (16–21, 21–12, 21–13)	—N/a	1 Q	Dumnern Junthong (THA); W (14–21, 21–16, 21–11)	Wiwin Adri (INA); L (21–17, 17–21, 8–21)	Did not advance	3rd place, bronze medalist(s)
Wiwin Adri	Singles WH2	Truong Ngoc Binh (VIE); W (21–12, 21–6)	Aphichat Sumpradit (THA); W (21–5, 21–11)	—N/a	1 Q	—N/a	Supriadi (INA); W (17–21, 21–17, 21–8)	Agus Budi Utomo (INA); W (21–13, 21–8)	1st place, gold medalist(s)
Dwiyoko / Fredy Setiawan	Doubles SL3/4	Natthapol Chamnanwet / Chawarat Kitichokwattana (THA); W (21–10, 20–22, 21–10)	Poloong Loc / Ta Truc (VIE); W (21–15, 21–14)	—N/a	1 Q	—N/a	Mongkhon Bunsun / Siripong Teamarrom (THA); W (21–15, 21–19)	Hary Susanto / Ukun Rukaendi (INA); W (21–14, 15–21, 21–10)	1st place, gold medalist(s)
Hary Susanto / Ukun Rukaendi	Doubles SL3/4	Nguyen Vanh Thuong / Trinh Anh Tuan (VIE); W (21–5, 21–11)	Mongkhon Bunsun / Siripong Teamarrom (THA); W (21–18, 17–21, 21–14)	—N/a	1 Q	—N/a	Natthapol Chamnanwet / Chawarat Kitichokwattana (THA); W (21–15, 21–17)	Dwiyoko / Fredy Setiawan (INA); L (14–21, 21–15, 10–21)	2nd place, silver medalist(s)
Dheva Anrimusthi; Hafiz Brilliansyah Prawiranegara	Doubles SU5	Chao Thyrith / Suy Samnang (CAM); W (Walkover)	Mohamad Faris Ahmad Azri / Mohd Amin Burhanuddin (MAS); W (21–6, 21–19)	—N/a	1 Q	—N/a	Mohamad Faris Ahmad Azri / Mohd Amin Burhanuddin (MAS); W (21–15, 21–9)	Oddie Listyanto Putra / Suryo Nugroho (INA); W (21–15, 21–12)	1st place, gold medalist(s)
Oddie Listyanto Putra; Suryo Nugroho	Doubles SU5	Chindanai Ninudomsak / Nattaphon Thaweesap (THA); W (Walkover)	Antonio Dela Cruz / Joseph Clyde Belga (PHI); W (21–9, 21–9)	—N/a	1 Q	Bui Minh Hai / Pham Van Toi (VIE); W (21–15, 21–7)	Cheah Liek Hou / Muhammad Fareez Anuar (MAS); W (21–19, 15–21, 21–19)	Dheva Anrimusthi / Hafiz Brilliansyah Prawiranegara (INA); L (15–21, 12–21)	2nd place, silver medalist(s)
Agung Widodo; Supriadi	Doubles WH1/2	Dumnern Junthong / Anuwat Sriboran (THA); W (21–17, 21–19)	Muhammad Ikhwan Ramli / Noor Azwan Noorlan (MAS); L (17–21, 16–21)	—N/a	2 Q	—N/a	Hoang Manh Giang / Truong Ngoc Binh (VIE); W (21–8, 21–13)	Muhammad Ikhwan Ramli / Noor Azwan Noorlan (MAS); L (21–19, 10–21, 18–21)	2nd place, silver medalist(s)

Athlete	Event	Group Stage				Final	
Athlete	Event	Opposition Score	Opposition Score	Opposition Score	Opposition Score	Opposition Score	Rank
Subhan	Singles SH6	Dimas Tri Aji (INA); W (21–6, 21–15)	AK Muhd Amirul Fa'iq Pangeran Zali (BRU); W (21–8, 21–9)	Johnlo Bandala Respicio (PHI); W (21–13, 21–12)	Bunthan Yaemmali (THA); W (21–10, 21–14)	—N/a	1st place, gold medalist(s)
Dimas Tri Aji	Singles SH6	Subhan (INA); L (6–21, 15–21)	Bunthan Yaemmali (THA); W (16–21, 21–13, 21–7)	AK Muhd Amirul Fa'iq Pangeran Zali (BRU); W (21–7, 21–11)	Johnlo Bandala Respicio (PHI); W (21–11, 21–17)	—N/a	2nd place, silver medalist(s)
Suryo Nugroho; Fredy Setiawan; Hafiz Brilliansyah Prawiranegara; Ukun Rukaendi; Dheva Anrimusthi; Hary Susanto	Men's team standing	Vietnam; W 3–0	Thailand; W 3–0	—N/a			1st place, gold medalist(s)

Women

Athlete	Event	Group Stage				Final	
Athlete	Event	Opposition Score	Opposition Score	Opposition Score	Opposition Score	Opposition Score	Rank
Khalimatus Sadiyah	Singles SL3/4	Qonitah Ikhtiar (INA); W (21–14, 21–7)	Chanida Srinavakul (THA); W (21–14, 21–8)	Lia Priyanti (INA); W (21–10, 21–15)	Samownkorn Photisuppaiboon (THA); W (21–12, 21–9)	—N/a	1st place, gold medalist(s)
Lia Priyanti	Singles SL3/4	Samownkorn Photisuppaiboon (THA); W (21–18, 21–13)	Khalimatus Sadiyah (INA); L (10–21, 15–21)	Qonitah Ikhtiar (INA); W (21–16, 22–24, 21–15)	Chanida Srinavakul (THA); W (22–20, 21–19)	—N/a	2nd place, silver medalist(s)
Qonitah Ikhtiar	Singles SL3/4	Khalimatus Sadiyah (INA); L (14–21, 7–21)	Chanida Srinavakul (THA); L (12–21, 8–21)	Lia Priyanti (INA); L (16–21, 24–22, 15–21)	Samownkorn Photisuppaiboon (THA); W (21–11, 21–11)	—N/a	4
Warining Rahayu	Singles SU5	Sudsaifon Yodpa (THA); W (21–3, 21–9)	Wathini Naramitkornburee (THA); W (21–4, 21–7)	—N/a			1st place, gold medalist(s)
Rina Marlina	Singles SH6	Yunia Widya Irianti (INA); W (21–6, 21–10)	Julie Sadecon Guadayo (PHI); W (21–4, 21–3)	Chai Saeyang (THA); W (21–7, 21–6)	—N/a		1st place, gold medalist(s)
Yunia Widya Irianti	Singles SH6	Rina Marlina (INA); L (6–21, 10–21)	Chai Saeyang (THA); L (11–21, 14–21)	Julie Sadecon Guadayo (PHI); W (21–14, 21–12)	—N/a		3rd place, bronze medalist(s)
Khalimatus Sadiyah; Lia Priyanti	Doubles SL3-SU5	Qonitah Ikhtiar / Warining Rahayu (INA); L (21–17, 20–22, 14–21)	Darunee Henpraiwan / Wathini Naramitkornburee (THA); W (21–14, 21–15)	Nipada Saensupa / Chanida Srinavakul (THA); W (21–14, 21–12)	—N/a		2nd place, silver medalist(s)
Qonitah Ikhtiar; Warining Rahayu	Doubles SL3-SU5	Khalimatus Sadiyah / Lia Priyanti (INA); W (17–21, 22–20, 21–14)	Nipada Saensupa / Chanida Srinavakul (THA); W (21–15, 19–21, 21–19)	Darunee Henpraiwan / Wathini Naramitkornburee (THA); W (21–12, 21–23, 21–17)	—N/a		1st place, gold medalist(s)

Mixed

Athlete	Event	Group Stage				Final	
Athlete	Event	Opposition Score	Opposition Score	Opposition Score	Rank	Opposition Score	Rank
Fredy Setiawan; Khalimatus Sadiyah	Doubles SL3-SU5	Khoirur Roziqin / Warining Rahayu (INA); W (21–9, 21–14)	Siripong Teamarrom / Nipada Saensupa (THA); W (21–11, 26–24)	Pricha Somsiri / Darunee Henpraiwan (THA); W (Walkover)	—N/a		1st place, gold medalist(s)
Khoirur Roziqin; Warining Rahayu	Doubles SL3-SU5	Fredy Setiawan / Khalimatus Sadiyah (INA); L (9–21, 14–21)	Pricha Somsiri / Darunee Henpraiwan (THA); W (Walkover)	Siripong Teamarrom / Nipada Saensupa (THA); L (16–21, 13–21)	—N/a		3rd place, bronze medalist(s)
Subhan; Rina Marlina	Doubles SH6	Dimas Tri Aji / Yunia Widya Irianti (INA); W (21–10, 21–9)	Johnlo Bandala Respicio / Julie Sadecon Guadayo (PHI); W (21–3, 21–5)	Bunthan Yaemmali / Chai Saeyang (THA); W (21–6, 21–10)	—N/a		1st place, gold medalist(s)
Dimas Tri Aji; Yunia Widya Irianti	Doubles SH6	Subhan / Rina Marlina (INA); L (10–21, 9–21)	Bunthan Yaemmali / Chai Saeyang (THA); L (23–25, 18–21)	Johnlo Bandala Respicio / Julie Sadecon Guadayo (PHI); W (21–15, 21–18)	—N/a		3rd place, bronze medalist(s)

== Blind Judo ==
MEN
Athlete	Event	Group Stage		Quarter Finals	Semifinals	Final	
Athlete	Event	Oppositions Scores	Rank	Opposition Score	Opposition Score	Opposition Score	Rank
Fajar Pambudi	Men's J1 & J2 -90kg	—N/a			Ranto Herli Imanuel Sambouw (INA); W 1–0	Junifor Bate'E (INA); W 1–0	1st place, gold medalist(s)
Junifor Bate'E	Men's J1 & J2 -90kg	—N/a		Huynh Tien Phat (VIE); W 1–0	Agustin Carlito Jr E (PHI); W 1–0	Fajar Pambudi (INA); L 0–1	2nd place, silver medalist(s)
Ranto Herli Imanuel Sambouw	Men's J1 & J2 -90kg	—N/a		Kittikai Chaisin (THA); W 1–0	Fajar Pambudi (INA); L 0–1	Huynh Tien Phat (VIE); W 1–0	3rd place, bronze medalist(s)

== Cerebal Palsy Football ==
MEN
Team	Event	Group Stage				Semifinals / Pl.	Final / BM / Pl.	
Team	Event	Oppositions Scores	Oppositions Scores	Oppositions Scores	Rank	Opposition Score	Opposition Score	Rank
Indonesia men's	Men's tournament	Thailand; W 3–2	Myanmar; W 5–1	Cambodia; W 7–1		Cambodia; W 9–2	Thailand; L 5–6	2nd place, silver medalist(s)

== Chess ==
MEN
Athlete	Event	Class	Round 1	Round 2	Round 3	Round 4	Round 5	Round 6	Semifinal	Final	
Athlete	Event	Class	Opposition Score	Opposition Score	Opposition Score	Opposition Score	Opposition Score	Opposition Score	Opposition Score	Opposition Score	Rank
Indra Yoga	Individual Standard	VI-B1	Anthony Abogado (PHI); W 1–0	Dinh Tuan Son (VIE); 0.5–0.5	Francis Ching (PHI); W 1–0	Le Van Viet (VIE); W 1–0	Prasetio Fitrianto (INA); W 1–0	Yadi Sopiyan (INA); W 1–0	—N/a		1st place, gold medalist(s)

WOMEN
Athlete	Event	Class	Round 1	Round 2	Round 3	Round 4	Round 5	Round 6	Semifinal	Final	
Athlete	Event	Class	Opposition Score	Opposition Score	Opposition Score	Opposition Score	Opposition Score	Opposition Score	Opposition Score	Opposition Score	Rank
Puspita Tita	Individual Standard	VI-B1	Ma.Katrina Mangawang (PHI); W 1–0	Pham Thi Huong (VIE); W 1–0	Tran Ngoc Loan (VIE); W 1–0	Wilma Margaretha Sinaga (INA); W 1–0	Yustina Halawa (INA); W 1–0	Elena Peligro (PHI); W 1–0	—N/a		1st place, gold medalist(s)

== Goalball ==
MEN
Team	Event	Group Stage							Semifinals	Final	
Team	Event	Oppositions Scores	Oppositions Scores	Oppositions Scores	Oppositions Scores	Oppositions Scores	Oppositions Scores	Rank	Opposition Score	Opposition Score	Rank
Indonesia men's	Men's tournament	Laos; W 13–3	Cambodia; W 14–4	Malaysia; W 11–6	Thailand; L 1–11	Myanmar; W 20–10	Philippines; W 10–0		Malaysia; W 12–2	Thailand; L12-13	2nd place, silver medalist(s)

WOMEN
Team	Event	Group Stage					Semifinals	Final	
Team	Event	Oppositions Scores	Oppositions Scores	Oppositions Scores	Oppositions Scores	Rank	Opposition Score	Opposition Score	Rank
Indonesia women's	Women's tournament	Singapore; L 4–6	Myanmar; W 7–2	Thailand; L 1–11	Laos; W 4–1	3 Q	Singapore; L 3–4	Laos; W 6–5	3rd place, bronze medalist(s)

== Sitting volleyball ==
Indonesia will be participating in the men's and women's tournament, sending a total of 16 players in Sitting volleyball.

=== Men's tournament ===
Team	Event	Group Stage		Semifinals / Pl.	Final / BM / Pl.	
Team	Event	Opposition Score	Rank	Opposition Score	Opposition Score	Rank
Indonesia men's	Men's tournament	Thailand; L 1–3 Malaysia; W 3–0	2 Q	Cambodia; L 2–3	Myanmar; W 3–1	3rd place, bronze medalist(s)

==== Group play ====
Pos	Team	Pld	W	L	Pts	SW	SL	SR	SPW	SPL	SPR	Qualification
1	Thailand	2	2	0	4	6	1	6.000	170	112	1.518	Semifinals
2	Indonesia	2	1	1	3	4	3	1.333	150	132	1.136	Semifinals
3	Malaysia	2	0	2	2	0	6	0.000	74	150	0.493	

=== Women's tournament ===
Team	Event	Group Stage		Final / BM / Pl.	
Team	Event	Opposition Score	Rank	Opposition Score	Rank
Indonesia women's	Women's tournament	Cambodia; W 3–0 Thailand; W 3–0	1 Q	Thailand; W 3–0	1st place, gold medalist(s)

==== Group play ====
Pos	Team	Pld	W	L	Pts	SW	SL	SR	SPW	SPL	SPR	Qualification
1	Indonesia	3	3	0	6	9	0	MAX	225	73	3.082	Gold medal
2	Thailand	3	1	2	4	3	5	0.600	156	182	0.857	Silver medal
3	Cambodia	3	0	3	3	0	9	0.000	74	225	0.329	Bronze medal

== Powerlifting ==
Men's

Athlete	Event	Best lift	Rank	Total	Rank
Hadi	–49kg	150	2nd place, silver medalist(s)	443	2nd place, silver medalist(s)
Tambi	–80kg	173	1st place, gold medalist(s)	495	2nd place, silver medalist(s)
Andika Eka	–88kg	173	2nd place, silver medalist(s)	512	2nd place, silver medalist(s)
Atmaji	–97kg	193	1st place, gold medalist(s)	568	1st place, gold medalist(s)

Women's

Athlete	Event	Best lift	Rank	Total	Rank
Eneng	–41kg	74	1st place, gold medalist(s)	144	1st place, gold medalist(s)
Ni Nengah Widiasih	–45kg	97	1st place, gold medalist(s)	97	1st place, gold medalist(s)
Rani Puji	–61kg	90	1st place, gold medalist(s)	90	2nd place, silver medalist(s)
Shebrioni	–67kg	103	1st place, gold medalist(s)	298	1st place, gold medalist(s)
Nur Tani	–73kg	103	1st place, gold medalist(s)	288	1st place, gold medalist(s)
Siti	–79kg	100	1st place, gold medalist(s)	285	1st place, gold medalist(s)
Ni Nengah Widiasih	–86kg	85	1st place, gold medalist(s)	240	1st place, gold medalist(s)
Sriyanti	+86kg	127	1st place, gold medalist(s)	372	1st place, gold medalist(s)

== Table tennis ==
Men

Athlete	Event	Round Robin			Semifinals	Final / BM	
Athlete	Event	Opposition Result	Opposition Result	Rank	Opposition Result	Opposition Result	Rank
David Jacobs	Individual C10	P Punkaew (THA); W 3–0	P Kankingkam (THA); W 3–0	1 Q	B Sillapakong (THA); W 3–0	K Akbar (INA); W 3–1	1st place, gold medalist(s)
Komet Akbar	Individual C10	N Van Hiep (VIE); W 3–0	B Sillapakong (THA); L 2–3	2 Q	A Suratman (THA); W 3–0	D Jacobs (INA); L 1–3	2nd place, silver medalist(s)
Aman Suratman	Individual C10	—N/a	P Punkaew (THA); W 3–0	1 Q	K Akbar (INA); L 0–3	Did not advance	

== Wheelchair basketball ==
=== Men's tournament ===
Team	Event	Group Stage		Semifinals / Pl.	Final / BM / Pl.	
Team	Event	Opposition Score	Rank	Opposition Score	Opposition Score	Rank
Indonesia men's	Men's 3-on-3	Philippines; L 10–15 Thailand; L 2–18; Cambodia; L 5–8	4	—N/a	Cambodia; W 9–5	3rd place, bronze medalist(s)
Indonesia men's	Men's team	Thailand; L 29–68 Cambodia; W 63–42; Philippines; L 30–61	3	—N/a	Cambodia; W 61–35	3rd place, bronze medalist(s)

==== Group play ====
Pos	Team	Pld	W	L	PF	PA	PD	Pts	Qualification
1	Thailand (THA)	3	3	0	54	13	+41	6	Qualified for the Gold medal match
2	Philippines (PHI)	3	2	1	42	35	+7	5	Qualified for the Gold medal match
3	Cambodia (CAM)	3	1	2	16	40	−24	4	Qualified for the Bronze medal match
4	Indonesia (INA) (H)	3	0	3	17	41	−24	3	Qualified for the Bronze medal match

(H) Hosts

10:30, July 30, 2022

Report

Indonesia	10–15	Philippines

13:30, July 30, 2022

Report

Indonesia	2–18	Thailand

10:30, July 31, 2022

Report

Indonesia	5–8	Cambodia

Bronze medal match

14:30, July 31, 2022

Report

Indonesia	9–5	Cambodia

== Wheelchair tennis ==
Athlete	Event	Quarterfinals	Semifinals	Final / BM	
Athlete	Event	Opposition Result	Opposition Result	Opposition Result	Rank
Agus Fitriadi	Men's singles	Naruemith (THA); L 3–6, 1–6	Did not advance		
Kevin Sanjaya	Men's singles	Klongrua (THA); L 3–6, 3–6	Did not advance		
Ndaru Patma Putri	Women's singles	Chanungarn (THA); W 6–1, 6–1	Faizatul Ahya (MAS); W 6–2, 5–7, 6–3	Khansthasit (THA); L 0–6, 1–6	2nd place, silver medalist(s)
Siti Hana Komala Sari	Women's singles	—N/a	Khansthasit (THA); L 0–6, 0–6	Did not advance	3rd place, bronze medalist(s)
Ndaru Patma Putri; Siti Hana Komala Sari	Women's doubles	—N/a		Khanthasit/ Nongnuch (THA); L 0–6, 1–6	—N/a
Nurdin; Madhusen	Quad doubles	—N/a		Chonlapat/ Taosrisakul (THA); L 1–6, 3–6	—N/a

Athlete	Event	Round Robin			
Athlete	Event	Opposition Result	Opposition Result	Opposition Result	Rank
Kevin Sanjaya; Agus Fitriadi	Men's doubles	Worakit / Suwan (THA); W 7–6, 7–6	Fikri Thoib / Daryoko (INA); W 6–0, 6–0	Yusshazwan / Borhan (MAS); L 4–6, 3–6	2nd place, silver medalist(s)
Fikkri Thoib; Daryoko	Men's doubles	Yusshazwan / Borhan (MAS); L 1–6, 2–6	Kevin Sanjaya/ Agus Fitriadi (INA); L 0–6, 0–6	Worakit / Suwan (THA); L 1–6, 1–6	3rd place, bronze medalist(s)

Athlete	Event	Round Robin			
Athlete	Event	Opposition Result	Opposition Result	Opposition Result	Rank
Nurdin	Quad singles	Janteam (THA); L 3–6, 2–6	Yamphapa (THA); L 0–6, 0–6	Madhusen (INA); L 1–6, 0–6	3rd place, bronze medalist(s)
Madhusen	Quad singles	Yamphapa (THA); L 2–6, 0–6	Janteam (THA); W 6–4, 5–7, 6–4	Nurdin (INA); W 6–1, 6–0	3rd place, bronze medalist(s)
