= Qonitah Ikhtiar Syakuroh =

Indonesian para badminton player

Personal information
- Born: 29 December 2001 (age 24) Kulon Progo, Yogyakarta, Indonesia

Sport
- Country: Indonesia
- Sport: Badminton
- Handedness: Right

Women's singles SL3
- Highest ranking: 1 (31 October 2023)
- Current ranking: 1
- BWF profile
Medal record
Women's para-badminton
Representing Indonesia
Paralympic Games
Silver medal – second place	2024 Paris	Women's singles
World Championships
Silver medal – second place	2024 Pattaya	Women's singles
World Abilitysport Games
Silver medal – second place	2023 Nakhon Ratchasima	Women's doubles
Bronze medal – third place	2023 Nakhon Ratchasima	Women's singles
Asian Para Games
Silver medal – second place	2022 Hangzhou	Women's singles
Bronze medal – third place	2026 Aichi-Nagoya	Women's singles
Asian Championships
Gold medal – first place	2025 Nakhon Ratchasima	Women's singles
ASEAN Para Games
Gold medal – first place	2022 Surakarta	Women's doubles
Gold medal – first place	2023 Cambodia	Women's singles
Bronze medal – third place	2023 Cambodia	Women's doubles

Qonitah Ikhtiar Syakuroh (born 29 December 2001) is an Indonesian para-badminton player in the SL3 classification, she made her international debut at the 2022 ASEAN Para Games held in Surakarta, when she won a gold medal in women's doubles SL3–SU5 with Warining Rahayu. She won the women's singles gold medal and a bronze in women's doubles in the 2023 ASEAN Para Games held in Cambodia.

== Career ==
Syakuroh started playing badminton in 2015. In that year, she also participated in various championships attended by paralympian athletes. She presented gold for the Special Region of Yogyakarta at the National Paralympic Week in 2021. After that, she was called to enter the National Team for the ASEAN Para Games in March 2022.

== Achievements ==
=== Paralympic Games ===
Women's singles

Year	Venue	Opponent	Score	Result	Ref
2024	Arena Porte de La Chapelle, Paris, France	(China) Xiao Zuxian	14–21, 20–22	Silver	

=== World Championships ===
Women's singles

Year	Venue	Opponent	Score	Result	Ref
2024	Pattaya Exhibition and Convention Hall, Pattaya, Thailand	(China) Xiao Zuxian	12–21, 17–21	Silver	

=== World Abilitysport Games ===
Women's singles

Year	Venue	Opponent	Score	Result	Ref
2023	Terminal 21 Korat Hall, Nakhon Ratchasima, Thailand	(Indonesia) Khalimatus Sadiyah	8–21, 9–21	Bronze	

Women’s doubles

Year	Venue	Partner	Opponent	Score	Result	Ref
2023 (Note: This tournament uses a round robin system.)	Terminal 21 Korat Hall, Nakhon Ratchasima, Thailand	(Thailand) Wathini Naramitkornburee	(Indonesia) Leani Ratri Oktila (Indonesia) Khalimatus Sadiyah	11–21, 17–21	Silver	
2023	Terminal 21 Korat Hall, Nakhon Ratchasima, Thailand	(Thailand) Wathini Naramitkornburee	(Thailand) Nutvara Patitus (Thailand) Wandee Kamtam	21–5, 21–9	Silver	
2023	Terminal 21 Korat Hall, Nakhon Ratchasima, Thailand	(Thailand) Wathini Naramitkornburee	(India) Armudha Saravanan (India) Riddhi Pradipkumar Thacker	21–9, 21–5	Silver	

=== Asian Para Games ===
Women's singles

Year	Venue	Opponent	Score	Result	Ref
2022	Binjiang Gymnasium, Hangzhou, China	(China) Xiao Zuxian	21–13, 8–21, 14–21	Silver	
2026	Ichinomiya City Municipal Gymnasium, Ichinomiya, Japan	(China) Xiao Zuxian	21–9, 14–21, 9–21	Bronze	

=== Asian Para Championships ===
Women's singles

Year	Venue	Opponent	Score	Result	Ref
2025	SPADT Convention Center, Nakhon Ratchasima, Thailand	(India) Mandeep Kaur	21–11, 21–10	Gold	

=== ASEAN Para Games ===
Women's singles

Year	Venue	Opponent	Score	Result	Ref
2023	Morodok Techo Badminton Hall, Phnom Penh, Cambodia	(Thailand) Darunee Henpraiwan	21–7, 21–10	Gold	

Women's doubles

Year	Venue	Partner	Opponent	Score	Result	Ref
2022 (Note: This tournament uses a round robin system.)	Edutorium Muhammadiyah University of Surakarta, Surakarta, Indonesia	(Indonesia) Warining Rahayu	(Indonesia) Khalimatus Sadiyah (Indonesia) Lia Priyanti	17–21, 22–20, 21–14	Gold	
2022	Edutorium Muhammadiyah University of Surakarta, Surakarta, Indonesia	(Indonesia) Warining Rahayu	(Thailand) Nipada Saensupa (Thailand) Chanida Srinavakul	21–15, 19–21, 21–19	Gold	
2022	Edutorium Muhammadiyah University of Surakarta, Surakarta, Indonesia	(Indonesia) Warining Rahayu	(Thailand) Darunee Henpraiwan (Thailand) Wathini Naramitkornburee	21–12, 21–23, 21–17	Gold	
2023 (Note: This tournament uses a round robin system.)	Morodok Techo Badminton Hall, Phnom Penh, Cambodia	(Indonesia) Lia Priyanti	(Indonesia) Leani Ratri Oktila (Indonesia) Khalimatus Sadiyah	6–21, 14–21	Bronze	
2023	Morodok Techo Badminton Hall, Phnom Penh, Cambodia	(Indonesia) Lia Priyanti	(Thailand) Nipada Saensupa (Thailand) Chanida Srinavakul	20–22, 21–14, 9–21	Bronze	
2023	Morodok Techo Badminton Hall, Phnom Penh, Cambodia	(Indonesia) Lia Priyanti	(Thailand) Wandee Kamtam (Thailand) Wathini Naramitkornburee	21–7, 21–13	Bronze	

=== BWF Para Badminton World Circuit (12 titles, 8 runners-up) ===
The BWF Para Badminton World Circuit – Grade 2, Level 1, 2 and 3 tournaments has been sanctioned by the Badminton World Federation from 2022.

Women's singles

Year	Tournament	Level	Opponent	Score	Result	Ref
2022 (Note: This tournament uses a round robin system.)	Indonesia Para Badminton International	Level 3	(India) Neeraj	21–8, 21–14	(gold) Winner	
2022	Indonesia Para Badminton International	Level 3	(Australia) Amonrat Jamporn	21–9, 21–11	(gold) Winner	
2022	Indonesia Para Badminton International	Level 3	(Australia) Céline Vinot	21–15, 21–16	(gold) Winner	
2023	Spanish Para Badminton International	Level 2	(Ukraine) Oksana Kozyna	21–9, 21–14	(gold) Winner	
2023	Bahrain Para Badminton International	Level 2	(China) Xiao Zuxian	17–21, 14–21	(silver) Runner-up	
2023	Canada Para Badminton International	Level 1	(India) Mandeep Kaur	21–8, 21–16	(gold) Winner	
2023	4 Nations Para Badminton International	Level 1	(Turkey) Halime Yıldız	21–8, 21–8	(gold) Winner	
2023	Indonesia Para Badminton International	Level 3	(Turkey) Halime Yıldız	21–13, 21–12	(gold) Winner	
2023	Western Australia Para Badminton International	Level 2	(Turkey) Halime Yıldız	17–21, 21–15, 21–12	(gold) Winner	
2023	Japan Para Badminton International	Level 2	(China) Xiao Zuxian	14–21, 21–16, 14–21	(silver) Runner-up	
2023	Dubai Para Badminton International	Level 2	(Nigeria) Mariam Eniola Bolaji	7–21, 21–13, 11–21	(silver) Runner-up	
2024	4 Nations Para Badminton International	Level 1	(India) Manasi Joshi	21–6, 21–12	(gold) Winner	
2024	Indonesia Para Badminton International	Level 2	(India) Mandeep Kaur	21–10, 21–5	(gold) Winner	
2024 (Note: This tournament uses a round robin system.)	Bahrain Para Badminton International	Level 1	(Australia) Céline Vinot	21–12, 21–14	(gold) Winner	
2024	Bahrain Para Badminton International	Level 1	(Brazil) Adriane Spinetti Avila	21–8, 21–6	(gold) Winner	
2024	Bahrain Para Badminton International	Level 1	(India) Neeraj	21–13, 21–7	(gold) Winner	
2024	Bahrain Para Badminton International	Level 1	(India) Mandeep Kaur	21–16, 21–14	(gold) Winner	
2025	Thailand Para Badminton International	Level 2	(India) Neeraj	21–14, 21–8	(gold) Winner	
2025	British & Irish Para Badminton International	Level 1	(Nigeria) Mariam Eniola Bolaji	16–21, 21–16, 13–21	(silver) Runner-up	
2025	Indonesia Para Badminton International	Level 1	(Nigeria) Mariam Eniola Bolaji	20–16 retired	(gold) Winner	
2026	French Para Badminton International	Level 2	(Japan) Shino Kawai	14–21, 12–21	(silver) Runner-up	

Women's doubles

Year	Tournament	Level	Partner	Opponent	Score	Result	Ref
2022 (Note: This tournament uses a round robin system.)	Indonesia Para-Badminton International	Level 3	(Indonesia) Warining Rahayu	(Indonesia) Lia Priyanti (Indonesia) Khalimatus Sadiyah	23–25, 21–13, 21–10	(gold) Winner	
2022	Indonesia Para-Badminton International	Level 3	(Indonesia) Warining Rahayu	(India) Koshika Devda (India) Neeraj	21–5, 21–10	(gold) Winner	
2022	Indonesia Para-Badminton International	Level 3	(Indonesia) Warining Rahayu	(Australia) Caitlin Dransfield (Australia) Amonrat Jamporn	21–5, 21–15	(gold) Winner	
2024	Indonesia Para Badminton International	Level 2	(Indonesia) Warining Rahayu	(Indonesia) Leani Ratri Oktila (Indonesia) Khalimatus Sadiyah	8–21, 6–21	(silver) Runner-up	
2025	China Para-Badminton International	Level 2	(Indonesia) Warining Rahayu	(China) Li Tongtong (China) Liu Yuemei	22–20, 15–21, 20–22	(silver) Runner-up	

Mixed doubles

Year	Tournament	Level	Partner	Opponent	Score	Result	Ref
2022	Indonesia Para-Badminton International	Level 3	(Indonesia) Hafizh Briliansyah Prawiranegara	(Indonesia) Fredy Setiawan (Indonesia) Khalimatus Sadiyah	21–15, 12–21, 21–10	(silver) Runner-up	
