= Nur Jannaton Abdul Jalil =

Malaysian para archer

Personal information
- Born: November 5, 1995 (age 31) Seri Iskandar, Perak, Malaysia
- Education: Universiti Sains Malaysia
- Height: 100 cm (3 ft 3 in)

Sport
- Country: Malaysia
- Sport: Para archery
- Disability class: ST
Medal record
ASEAN Para Games
| Gold medal – first place | 2022 Surakarta | Mixed team compound |
Para Archery Asia Continental Qualification Tournament
| Silver medal – second place | 2023 Bangkok | Women's compound |
Para Sukma Games
| Gold medal – first place | 2018 Perak | Women's doubles compound |
| Gold medal – first place | 2022 Kuala Lumpur | Women's open compound |

Nur Jannaton Abdul Jalil (born 5 November 1995) is a Malaysian para-archer. She represented Malaysia at the 2024 Summer Paralympics.

== Early life and education ==
Nur Jannaton was born in Seri Iskandar, Perak and lives in Ipoh. She is the youngest of seven siblings. She attended Universiti Sains Malaysia, graduating with a degree in medical physics.

== Archery career ==
Nur Jannaton was introduced to para-archery through a Facebook group.

At the 2018 Para Sukma Games, she won gold in the women's doubles compound event.

At the 2022 Para Sukma Games, Nur Jannaton won the women's open compound event. She was also named best Female Athlete at the event.

At the 2022 ASEAN Para Games in Surakarta, Indonesia, she won a gold medal in the mixed team compound event.

As the 2023 Para Archery Asia Continental Qualification Tournament in Bangkok, Nur Jannaton won silver in the women's compound event, which solidified her place at the 2024 Paralympics. She was the first female Paralympic archer to represent Malaysia by qualifying in another competition.

At the 2024 World Para Archery tournament in Dubai, Nur Jannaton set a personal record of 615 points.

In the 2024 Paralympics, Nur Jannaton competed in the women's individual compound event. After ranking 24th in qualification, she was knocked out of competition in the final 16. Her final score was 649 points, breaking her record from earlier that year.

Nur Jannaton has advocated for disabled children's access to para-sports since 2022.
