= Malaysia at the ASEAN Para Games =

- IPC code: MAS
- NPC: Paralympic Council of Malaysia
- Website: paralympic.org.my
- Medals Ranked 3rd: Gold 805 Silver 701 Bronze 608 Total 2,114

ASEAN Para Games appearances (overview)
- 2001; 2003; 2005; 2008; 2009; 2011; 2014; 2015; 2017; 2022; 2023; 2025

Malaysia has competed at every of the ASEAN Para Games which was first held in Kuala Lumpur, Malaysia in 2001 ASEAN Para Games.

== Medal tables ==
*Red border color indicates tournament was held on home soil.

=== Medals by Games ===
Games	Rank	Gold	Silver	Bronze	Total
2001 Kuala Lumpur	1	143	136	92	371
2003 Hanoi	3	54	40	46	140
2005 Manila	3	75	40	26	141
2008 Nakhon Ratchasima	2	82	74	46	202
2009 Kuala Lumpur	2	94	81	71	246
2011 Surakarta	3	51	36	45	132
2014 Naypyidaw	3	50	49	41	140
2015 Singapore	3	52	58	37	147
2017 Kuala Lumpur	2	90	85	83	258
2020 Philippines	Cancelled due to the COVID-19 pandemic				
2022 Surakarta	4	36	20	13	69
2023 Cambodia	4	50	38	34	122
2026 Nakhon Ratchasima	3	64	64	73	201
Total	3	805	701	608	2,114

== See also ==
- Malaysia at the Paralympics
- Malaysia at the Asian Para Games
- Malaysia at the Southeast Asian Games
