= Wheelchair tennis at the 2022 ASEAN Para Games =

Wheelchair tennis competition

- Venue: Tennis Center Manahan Stadium
- Dates: 31 July – 5 August 2022

Wheelchair tennis at the 2022 ASEAN Para Games was held at Tennis Center Manahan Stadium.

Originally set to be host by Vietnam in 2021, the Games were initially cancelled due to the COVID-19 pandemic in Vietnam before hosting rights were transferred to Indonesia. It is also originally scheduled from 23 to 30 July 2022, later moved to 30 July to 6 August 2022.

== Medal summary ==
* Host nation (Indonesia)

Rank	Nation	Gold	Silver	Bronze	Total
1	Thailand (THA)	5	1	2	8
2	Malaysia (MAS)	1	1	2	4
3	Indonesia (INA)*	0	2	4	6
Totals (3 entries)		6	4	8	18

== Medalists ==
=== Men ===
Event	Gold	Silver	Bronze
Singles	Suthi Klongrua; Thailand	Mohamad Yusshazwan Bin Yusoff; Malaysia	Abu Samah Borhan; Malaysia
Singles	Suthi Klongrua; Thailand	Mohamad Yusshazwan Bin Yusoff; Malaysia	Nauremith Benkhuntod; Thailand
Doubles	Mohamad Yusshazwan Bin Yusoff; Abu Samah Borhan; Malaysia	Kevin Sanjaya; Agus Fitriadi; Indonesia	Fikkri Thoib; Daryoko; Indonesia
Doubles	Mohamad Yusshazwan Bin Yusoff; Abu Samah Borhan; Malaysia	Kevin Sanjaya; Agus Fitriadi; Indonesia	Worakit Daengchuen; Banjob Suwan; Thailand
Quad Singles	Sombut Yamphapa; Thailand	Pol Janteam; Thailand	Madhusen; Indonesia
Quad Singles	Sombut Yamphapa; Thailand	Pol Janteam; Thailand	Nurdin; Indonesia
Quad Doubles	Sorod Chonlaphat; Nattaporn Taosrisakul; Thailand	not awarded	not awarded

=== Women ===
Event	Gold	Silver	Bronze
Singles	Sakorn Khanthasit; Thailand	Ndaru Patma Putri; Indonesia	Faizatul Ahya Binti Abdullah Thani; Malaysia
Singles	Sakorn Khanthasit; Thailand	Ndaru Patma Putri; Indonesia	Siti Hanna Komala Sari; Indonesia
Doubles	Sakorn Khanthasit; Nongnuch Roswan; Thailand	not awarded	not awarded

== Men's Singles ==
=== Finals ===
Quarterfinals
Agus Fitriadi (INA)	3	1
Naruemith Benkhunthod (THA)	6	6
Klongrua Suthi (THA)	6	6
Kevin Sanjaya (INA)	3	3

Semi-finals
Mohamad Yusshazwan Bin Yusoff (MAS)	6	6
Naruemith Benkhunthod (THA) (bronze)	1	4
Abu Samah Borhan (MAS) (bronze)	3	4
Klongrua Suthi (THA)	6	6

Final
Mohamad Yusshazwan Bin Yusoff (MAS) (silver)	2	6	6
Klongrua Suthi (THA) (gold)	6	4	7

== Women's Singles ==
=== Finals ===
Quarterfinals			Semi-finals				Final
			Ndaru Patma Putri (INA)	6	5	6
Ndaru Patma Putri (INA)	6	6	Faizatul Ahya Binti Abdullah Thani (MAS) (bronze)	2	7	3
Chanungarn Techamaneewat (THA)	1	1					Ndaru Patma Putri (INA) (silver)	0	1
							Sakorn Khanthasit (THA) (gold)	6	6
			Siti Hanna Komala Sari (INA) (bronze)	0	0
			Sakorn Khanthasit (THA)	6	6

== Quad Singles ==
=== Group Stage ===
Athlete	Matches won	Matches lost	Games won	Games lost	Points diff	Rank
Sombut Yamphapa (THA)	2	1	5	2	3	1st place, gold medalist(s)
Pol Janteam (THA)	2	1	5	3	2	2nd place, silver medalist(s)
Madhusen (INA)	2	1	4	2	2	3rd place, bronze medalist(s)
Nurdin (INA)	0	3	0	6	−6	3rd place, bronze medalist(s)

Pol Janteam (THA)	6	6
Nurdin (INA)	3	2

Sombut Yamphapa (THA)	6	6
Madhusen (INA)	2	0

Sombut Yamphapa (THA)	6	6
Nurdin (INA)	0	0

Madhusen (INA)	6	5	6
Pol Janteam (THA)	4	7	4

Pol Janteam (THA)	6	3	6
Sombut Yamphapa (THA)	3	6	4

Madhusen (INA)	6	6
Nurdin (INA)	1	0

== Quad Doubles ==
=== Finals ===
Semi-finals
Bye
Nurdin; Madhusen (INA)
Sorod Chonlaphat; Nattaporn Taosrisakul (THA)
Bye

Final
Nurdin; Madhusen (INA)	1	3
Sorod Chonlaphat; Nattaporn Taosrisakul (THA) (gold)	6	6

== Men's Doubles ==
=== Group Stage ===
Athlete	Matches won	Matches lost	Games won	Games lost	Points diff	Rank
Yusshazwan Bin Yusoff; Abu Samah Borhan (MAS)	3	0	6	0	6	1st place, gold medalist(s)
Kevin Sanjaya; Agus Fitriadi (INA)	2	1	4	2	2	2nd place, silver medalist(s)
Worakit Daengchuen; Banjob Suwan (THA)	1	2	2	4	−2	3rd place, bronze medalist(s)
Fikkri Thoib; Daryoko (INA)	0	3	0	6	−6	3rd place, bronze medalist(s)

Yusshazwan; Borhan (MAS)	6	6
Fikkri; Daryoko (INA)	1	2

Kevin; Fitriadi (INA)	7	7
Worakit; Banjob (THA)	6	6

Yusshazwan; Borhan (MAS)	6	6
Worakit; Banjob (THA)	2	3

Kevin; Fitriadi (INA)	6	6
Fikkri; Daryoko (INA)	0	0

Worakit; Banjob (THA)	6	6
Fikkri; Daryoko (INA)	1	1

Yusshazwan; Borhan (MAS)	6	6
Kevin; Fitriadi (INA)	4	3

== Women's Doubles ==
=== Finals ===
Semi-finals
Bye
Sakorn Khanthasit; Nongnuch Roswan (THA)
Ndaru Patma Putri; Siti Hanna Komala Sari (INA)
Bye

Final
Sakorn Khanthasit; Nongnuch Roswan (THA) (gold)	6	6
Ndaru Patma Putri; Siti Hanna Komala Sari (INA)	0	1

== See also ==
- Tennis at the 2021 Southeast Asian Games
- Tennis at the 2023 Southeast Asian Games
