= Warining Rahayu =

Indonesian para badminton player

Personal information
- Born: 26 May 2001 (age 25) Bandung, West Java, Indonesia

Sport
- Country: Indonesia
- Sport: Badminton
- Event: SU5

SU5
- BWF profile
Medal record
Women's para-badminton
Representing Indonesia
ASEAN Para Games
| Gold medal – first place | 2017 Kuala Lumpur | Women's singles |
| Gold medal – first place | 2022 Surakarta | Women's singles |
| Gold medal – first place | 2022 Surakarta | Women's doubles |
| Gold medal – first place | 2023 Cambodia | Women's singles |
| Bronze medal – third place | 2022 Surakarta | Mixed doubles |
Asian Youth Para Games
| Silver medal – second place | 2021 Manama | Girls' singles |
| Bronze medal – third place | 2017 Dubai | Girls' singles |

Warining Rahayu (born 26 May 2001) is an Indonesian para badminton player. She won gold medal at the 2017 ASEAN Para Games in Kuala Lumpur, Malaysia. In 2018, Rahayu claimed her first BWF Para-Badminton International event title at the Irish Para-Badminton International.

At the 2022 ASEAN Para Games held in Surakarta, she won a women's single gold medal, another gold in women's doubles SL3–SU5 with Qonitah Ikhtiar Syakuroh, and a bronze in mixed doubles. She also won a women's singles gold in the 2023 ASEAN Pare Games held in Cambodia.

== Achievements ==
=== ASEAN Para Games ===
Women's singles

| Year | Venue | Opponent | Score | Result |
|---|---|---|---|---|
| 2017 | Axiata Arena, Kuala Lumpur, Malaysia | (Malaysia) Noorrizah Rahim | 21–18, 21–16 | Gold |
| 2022 (Note: This tournament uses a round robin system.) | Edutorium Muhammadiyah University of Surakarta, Surakarta, Indonesia | (Thailand) Sudsaifon Yodpa | 21–3, 21–9 | Gold |
| 2022 | Edutorium Muhammadiyah University of Surakarta, Surakarta, Indonesia | (Thailand) Wathini Naramitkornburee | 21–4, 21–7 | Gold |
| 2023 (Note: This tournament uses a round robin system.) | Morodok Techo Badminton Hall, Phnom Penh, Cambodia | (Indonesia) Anisa Fitriyani | 21–12, 21–7 | Gold |
| 2023 | Morodok Techo Badminton Hall, Phnom Penh, Cambodia | (Thailand) Wathini Naramitkornburee | 21–13, 21–14 | Gold |

Women's doubles

| Year | Venue | Partner | Opponent | Score | Result |
|---|---|---|---|---|---|
| 2022 (Note: This tournament uses a round robin system.) | Edutorium Muhammadiyah University of Surakarta, Surakarta, Indonesia | (Indonesia) Qonitah Ikhtiar Syakuroh | (Indonesia) Khalimatus Sadiyah (Indonesia) Lia Priyanti | 17–21, 22–20, 21–14 | Gold |
| 2022 | Edutorium Muhammadiyah University of Surakarta, Surakarta, Indonesia | (Indonesia) Qonitah Ikhtiar Syakuroh | (Thailand) Nipada Saensupa (Thailand) Chanida Srinavakul | 21–15, 19–21, 21–19 | Gold |
| 2022 | Edutorium Muhammadiyah University of Surakarta, Surakarta, Indonesia | (Indonesia) Qonitah Ikhtiar Syakuroh | (Thailand) Darunee Henpraiwan (Thailand) Wathini Naramitkornburee | 21–12, 21–23, 21–17 | Gold |

Mixed doubles

| Year | Venue | Partner | Opponent | Score | Result |
|---|---|---|---|---|---|
| 2022 (Note: This tournament uses a round robin system.) | Edutorium Muhammadiyah University of Surakarta, Surakarta, Indonesia | (Indonesia) Khoirur Roziqin | (Indonesia) Fredy Setiawan (Indonesia) Khalimatus Sadiyah | 9–21, 14–21 | Bronze |
| 2022 | Edutorium Muhammadiyah University of Surakarta, Surakarta, Indonesia | (Indonesia) Khoirur Roziqin | (Thailand) Pricha Somsiri (Thailand) Darunee Henpraiwan | walkover | Bronze |
| 2022 | Edutorium Muhammadiyah University of Surakarta, Surakarta, Indonesia | (Indonesia) Khoirur Roziqin | (Thailand) Siripong Teamarrom (Thailand) Nipada Saensupa | 16–21, 13–21 | Bronze |

=== Asian Youth Para Games ===
Girls' singles

| Year | Venue | Opponent | Score | Result |
|---|---|---|---|---|
| 2017 (Note: This tournament uses a round robin system.) | Al Wasl Club, Dubai, United Arab Emirates | (China) Yang Qiuxia | 8–21, 4–21 | Bronze |
| 2017 | Al Wasl Club, Dubai, United Arab Emirates | (Iran) Rezvan Naserigol | 21–7, 21–6 | Bronze |
| 2017 | Al Wasl Club, Dubai, United Arab Emirates | (India) Arati Janoba Patil | 21–6, 21–3 | Bronze |
| 2017 | Al Wasl Club, Dubai, United Arab Emirates | (China) Li Tongtong | 6–21, 8–21 | Bronze |
| 2021 | Alba Club, Manama, Bahrain | (Japan) Remina Suzuki | 21–23, 12–21 | Silver |

=== BWF Para Badminton World Circuit (2 titles, 3 runners-up) ===
The BWF Para Badminton World Circuit – Grade 2, Level 1, 2 and 3 tournaments has been sanctioned by the Badminton World Federation from 2022.

Women's singles

| Year | Tournament | Level | Opponent | Score | Result |
|---|---|---|---|---|---|
| 2022 (Note: This tournament uses a round robin system.) | Indonesia Para-Badminton International | Level 3 | (Indonesia) Khalimatus Sadiyah | 21–12, 21–11 | (gold) Winner |
| 2022 | Indonesia Para-Badminton International | Level 3 | (Indonesia) Lia Priyanti | 21–4, 21–11 | (gold) Winner |
| 2022 | Indonesia Para-Badminton International | Level 3 | (India) Koshika Devda | 21–4, 21–6 | (gold) Winner |
| 2022 | Indonesia Para-Badminton International | Level 3 | (Australia) Caitlin Dransfield | 21–14, 21–11 | (gold) Winner |
| 2024 | Indonesia Para-Badminton International | Level 2 | (Indonesia) Leani Ratri Oktila | 12–21, 12–21 | (silver) Runner-up |

Women's doubles

| Year | Tournament | Level | Partner | Opponent | Score | Result | Ref |
|---|---|---|---|---|---|---|---|
| 2022 (Note: This tournament uses a round robin system.) | Indonesia Para-Badminton International | Level 3 | (Indonesia) Qonitah Ikhtiar Syakuroh | (Indonesia) Lia Priyanti (Indonesia) Khalimatus Sadiyah | 23–25, 21–13, 21–10 | (gold) Winner | |
| 2022 | Indonesia Para-Badminton International | Level 3 | (Indonesia) Qonitah Ikhtiar Syakuroh | (India) Koshika Devda (India) Neeraj | 21–5, 21–10 | (gold) Winner | |
| 2022 | Indonesia Para-Badminton International | Level 3 | (Indonesia) Qonitah Ikhtiar Syakuroh | (Australia) Caitlin Dransfield (Australia) Amonrat Jamporn | 21–5, 21–15 | (gold) Winner | |
| 2024 | Indonesia Para-Badminton International | Level 2 | (Indonesia) Qonitah Ikhtiar Syakuroh | (Indonesia) Leani Ratri Oktila (Indonesia) Khalimatus Sadiyah | 8–21, 6–21 | (silver) Runner-up | |
| 2025 | China Para-Badminton International | Level 2 | (Indonesia) Qonitah Ikhtiar Syakuroh | (China) Li Tongtong (China) Liu Yuemei | 22–20, 15–21, 20–22 | (silver) Runner-up | |

=== International Tournaments (1 title) ===
Women's singles

| Year | Tournament | Opponent | Score | Result |
|---|---|---|---|---|
| 2018 (Note: This tournament uses a round robin system.) | Irish Para-Badminton International | (Portugal) Beatriz Monteiro | 21–13, 21–11 | (gold) Winner |
| 2018 | Irish Para-Badminton International | (Ukraine) Ivana Redka | 21–6, 21–5 | (gold) Winner |
| 2018 | Irish Para-Badminton International | (Netherlands) Megan Hollander | 13–21, 21–19, 21–18 | (gold) Winner |
