= Wheelchair basketball at the 2022 ASEAN Para Games =

Wheelchair basketball competition

- Venue: Sritex Arena Sports Hall
- Dates: 30 July – 5 August 2022

Wheelchair basketball at the 2022 ASEAN Para Games was held at Sritex Arena Sports Hall, Surakarta.

== Medal summary ==
* Host nation (Indonesia)

Rank	Nation	Gold	Silver	Bronze	Total
1	Thailand (THA)	3	1	0	4
2	Cambodia (CAM)	1	1	0	2
3	Philippines (PHI)	0	2	0	2
4	Indonesia (INA)*	0	0	2	2
4	Laos (LAO)	0	0	2	2
Totals (5 entries)		4	4	4	12

== Medalists ==
Men

Event	Gold	Silver	Bronze
3-on-3	Thailand (THA); Aekkasit Jumjarean; Adisak Kaoboo; Thanakon Lertanachai; Teerapong Pasomsap; Kwanchai Pimkorn	Philippines (PHI); Alfie Cabañog; John Rey Escalante; Rene Macabenguil; Kenneth Christopher Tapia; Cleford Trocino	Indonesia (INA); Kasep Ayatullah; Denih; Danu Kuswantoro; Ivo Shadan; I Komang Suparta
Team	Thailand (THA); Natthakan Chaotrakarn; Jakkapan Jansupin; Aekkasit Jumjarean; Adisak Kaoboo; Thanakon Lertanachai; Teerapong Pasomsap; Kwanchai Pimkorn; Sirasak Rueangwongngam; Athin Singdong; Pongsakorn Sripirom; Somphong Thiyod; Mathee Yenkuan	Philippines (PHI); Mark Vincent Aguilar; Alfie Cabañog; Jannil Cañete; Kyle Carlo Carandang; John Rey Escalante; Moises Escobar; Jefferson Legacion; Rene Macabenguil; Freddie Magdayo; Marlon Nacita; Kenneth Christopher Tapia; Cleford Trocino	Indonesia (INA); Kasep Ayatullah; Denih; Lalu Idrus; I Ketut Gede Nesa Jatiana; Danu Kuswantoro; Riduan Purba; Ivo Shadan; Jaka Sriyana; I Komang Suparta; Yulianto

Women

Event	Gold	Silver	Bronze
3-on-3	Cambodia (CAM); Doung Chanraksa; Soem Da; San Rotha; Lak Savry; An Sinet	Thailand (THA); Pawarati Jala; Pornthip Kachunram; Natnapa Ponin; Pimjai Putthanoi; Anurak Sirinikorn	Laos (LAO); Nit Chittivong; Kaolee Chongxoualee; Phitsamai Keopaseuth; Vilayphone Khammykoun; Phoukhong
Team	Thailand (THA); Pawarati Jala; Numthip Jalunporlessin; Pornthip Kachunram; Tananya Kaewmak; Nuttaporn Lasopa; Saowalak Nanthasombat; Wikarnda Phewgradang; Natnapa Ponin; Pimjai Putthanoi; Anurak Sirinikorn; Nopparat Tanbut; Parichat Yamarun	Cambodia (CAM); Sieng Sok Chan; Tao Chanda; Doung Chanraksa; Ho Chanthy; Soem Da; Moa Et; Ek Srey Mom; Pheung Phors; San Rotha; Lak Savry; An Sinet; Ton Tom	Laos (LAO); Sinouane Chanthchit; Nit Chitthivong; Kaolee Chongxoualee; Phatsala Insalong; Nouhiem Kasien; Phitsamai Keopaseuth; Vilayphone Khammykoun; Phoukhong; Bounmy Somthala

== Results ==
=== Men's tournament 3-on-3 ===
==== Group stage ====
Pos	Team	Pld	W	L	PF	PA	PD	Pts	Qualification
1	Thailand (THA)	3	3	0	54	13	+41	6	Qualified for the Gold medal match
2	Philippines (PHI)	3	2	1	42	35	+7	5	Qualified for the Gold medal match
3	Cambodia (CAM)	3	1	2	16	40	−24	4	Qualified for the Bronze medal match
4	Indonesia (INA) (H)	3	0	3	17	41	−24	3	Qualified for the Bronze medal match

Source: APG 2022
(H) Hosts

10:30, July 30, 2022

Report

Indonesia	10–15	Philippines

11:30, July 30, 2022

Report

Cambodia	4–16	Thailand

13:30, July 30, 2022

Report

Indonesia	2–18	Thailand

10:30, July 31, 2022

Report

Cambodia	8–5	Indonesia

11:30, July 31, 2022

Report

Philippines	7–21	Thailand

13:30, July 31, 2022

Report

Cambodia	4–20	Philippines

==== Final round ====
===== Bronze medal match =====
14:30, July 31, 2022

Report

Cambodia	5–9	Indonesia

===== Gold medal match =====
15:30, July 31, 2022

Report

Thailand	21–12	Philippines

=== Women's tournament 3-on-3 ===
==== Group stage ====
Pos	Team	Pld	W	L	PF	PA	PD	Pts	Qualification
1	Cambodia (CAM)	3	3	0	38	13	+25	6	Qualified for the Gold medal match
2	Thailand (THA)	3	2	1	32	12	+20	5	Qualified for the Gold medal match
3	Laos (LAO)	3	1	2	14	25	−11	4	Qualified for the Bronze medal match
4	Philippines (PHI)	3	0	3	1	35	−34	3	Qualified for the Bronze medal match

Source: APG 2022

10:00, July 30, 2022

Report

Cambodia	11–5	Laos

11:00, July 30, 2022

Report

Philippines	0–11	Thailand

13:00, July 30, 2022

Report

Philippines	0–6	Laos

10:00, July 31, 2022

Report

Laos	3–13	Thailand

11:00, July 31, 2022

Report

Cambodia	9–8	Thailand

13:00, July 31, 2022

Report

Cambodia	18–0	Philippines

==== Final round ====
===== Bronze medal match =====
14:00, July 31, 2022

Report

Laos	4–0	Philippines

===== Gold medal match =====
15:00, July 31, 2022

Report

Cambodia	7–5	Thailand

=== Men's tournament 5-on-5 ===
==== Group stage ====
Pos	Team	Pld	W	L	PF	PA	PD	Pts	Qualification
1	Thailand (THA)	3	3	0	228	95	+133	6	Qualified for the Gold medal match
2	Philippines (PHI)	3	2	1	189	152	+37	5	Qualified for the Gold medal match
3	Indonesia (INA) (H)	3	1	2	122	171	−49	4	Qualified for the Bronze medal match
4	Cambodia (CAM)	3	0	3	100	221	−121	3	Qualified for the Bronze medal match

Source: APG 2022
(H) Hosts

10:00, August 1, 2022

Report

Indonesia	29–68	Thailand

15:00, August 1, 2022

Report

Philippines	89–31	Cambodia

10:00, August 2, 2022

Report

Indonesia	63–42	Cambodia

15:00, August 2, 2022

Report

Philippines	39–91	Thailand

10:00, August 3, 2022

Report

Thailand	69–27	Cambodia

15:00, August 3, 2022

Report

Indonesia	30–61	Philippines

==== Final round ====
===== Bronze medal match =====
11:00, August 4, 2022

Report

Indonesia	61–35	Cambodia

===== Gold medal match =====
13:00, August 5, 2022

Report

Thailand	87–36	Philippines

=== Women's tournament 5-on-5 ===
==== Group stage ====
Pos	Team	Pld	W	L	PF	PA	PD	Pts	Qualification
1	Thailand (THA)	3	3	0	166	73	+93	6	Qualified for the Gold medal match
2	Cambodia (CAM)	3	2	1	135	97	+38	5	Qualified for the Gold medal match
3	Laos (LAO)	3	1	2	121	112	+9	4	Qualified for the Bronze medal match
4	Philippines (PHI)	3	0	3	42	182	−140	3	Qualified for the Bronze medal match

Source: APG 2022

13:00, August 1, 2022

Report

Cambodia	29–47	Thailand

17:00, August 1, 2022

Report

Philippines	6–63	Laos

13:00, August 2, 2022

Report

Laos	27–50	Cambodia

17:00, August 2, 2022

Report

Philippines	13–63	Thailand

13:00, August 3, 2022

Report

Thailand	56–31	Laos

17:00, August 3, 2022

Report

Cambodia	56–23	Philippines

==== Final round ====
===== Bronze medal match =====
13:00, August 4, 2022

Report

Laos	58–9	Philippines

===== Gold medal match =====
11:00, August 5, 2022

Report

Thailand	50–39	Cambodia

== See also ==
- Basketball at the 2021 Southeast Asian Games
