= Sitting volleyball at the 2022 ASEAN Para Games =

- Venue: Tunas Pembangunan University (UTP) Sports Hall
- Location: Karanganyar, Jawa Tengah, Indonesia
- Dates: 1–4 August 2022

Sitting volleyball at the 2022 ASEAN Para Games was held between 30 July until 6 August 2021 at the Tunas Pembangunan University (UTP) Sports Hall, Karanganyar, Central Java.

== Medal summary ==
* Host nation (Indonesia)

Rank	Nation	Gold	Silver	Bronze	Total
1	Cambodia (CAM)	1	0	1	2
1	Indonesia (INA)*	1	0	1	2
3	Thailand (THA)	0	2	0	2
Totals (3 entries)		2	2	2	6

== Medalists ==
Event	Gold	Silver	Bronze
Men	Cambodia (CAM); Pon Dina; Mon Yaranh; Kao Haeurn; Srieng Leap; Ou Phall; Tong Ravy; Ing Phiream; Nhonh Sok; Youm Kreum; Oeun Nut; Srieng Sokna; Nai Ka	Thailand (THA); Anuchit Homkajon; Thawee Kanraya; Kittisak Khonkartok; Bordin Lapuangkham; Supirak Polsuk; Sombat Rungsrikool; Thirasak Chintasan; Jukre Nakkam; Thiwa Thuratham; Manop Muncharoen; Sura Chumphang; Sarun Karpmaichan	Indonesia (INA); Sumarmo; Nasrullah; Cahyana; Anton Hilman; Sukarno; Murdiyan; Nesa Kristiana; Purwadi
Women	Indonesia (INA); Santi Apriliani; Diah Dwiyanti; Sudartatik; Dina Rulina; Katerina Dewi Putri Kristianti; Ratifah Apriyanti; Sri Lestari; Annisa Tindy	Thailand (THA); Noi Pinitmontri; Wanna Ladee; Wanitha Inthanin; Thanyarat Riabram; Duean Pinkaew; Palaporn Yaowaphuek; Somporn Mirapong; Khamnai Chanthakhun; Jitakan Chuannok; Maneewon Meeaiam	Cambodia (CAM); Pring Thorn; Lors Nimul; Suon Rem; Peang Sophy; Yan Malin; Mut Channy; Kong Sras; Phan On; Vat Chanra

== Men's tournament ==
- Cambodia
- Indonesia
- Malaysia
- Myanmar
- Philippines
- Thailand

=== Group A ===
Pos	Team	Pld	W	L	Pts	SW	SL	SR	SPW	SPL	SPR	Qualification
1	Thailand	2	2	0	4	6	1	6.000	170	112	1.518	Semifinals
2	Indonesia	2	1	1	3	4	3	1.333	150	132	1.136	Semifinals
3	Malaysia	2	0	2	2	0	6	0.000	74	150	0.493	

=== Group B ===
Pos	Team	Pld	W	L	Pts	SW	SL	SR	SPW	SPL	SPR	Qualification
1	Cambodia	2	2	0	4	6	1	6.000	168	116	1.448	Semifinals
2	Myanmar	2	1	1	3	1	3	0.333	163	120	1.358	Semifinals
3	Philippines	2	0	2	2	0	3	0.000	55	150	0.367	

=== Knockout stage ===
==== Bracket ====
Semifinals
2 August
Thailand	3
Myanmar	1
August
Cambodia	3
Indonesia	2

Gold medal match
4 August
Cambodia	3
Thailand	1
Bronze medal match
3 August
Indonesia	3
Myanmar	1

== Women's tournament ==
- Cambodia
- Indonesia
- Thailand

=== Group 1 ===
Pos	Team	Pld	W	L	Pts	SW	SL	SR	SPW	SPL	SPR	Qualification
1	Indonesia	3	3	0	6	9	0	MAX	225	73	3.082	Gold medal
2	Thailand	3	1	2	4	3	5	0.600	156	182	0.857	Silver medal
3	Cambodia	3	0	3	3	0	9	0.000	74	225	0.329	Bronze medal
