= Badminton at the 2022 ASEAN Para Games =

Wheelchair badminton competition

- Venue: Edutorium Muhammadiyah University of Surakarta
- Dates: 1–5 August 2022

Badminton at the 2022 ASEAN Para Games was held at Edutorium Muhammadiyah University of Surakarta.

Originally set to be host by Vietnam in 2021, the Games were initially cancelled due to the COVID-19 pandemic in Vietnam before hosting rights were transferred to Indonesia. It is also originally scheduled from 23 to 30 July 2022, later moved to 30 July to 6 August 2022.

== Classification ==
There were six different classes in the competition.

Class	Description
WH1	Athletes who have impairment in both lower limbs and trunk and/or have high spinal cord injuries. They may also have impaired hand function which could impact the ability to manoeuvre in their wheelchair. Their playing style is by holding their wheelchair with one hand while the other hand is moving the racquet; they will push or pull themselves to a neutral wheelchair sitting position after the stroke.
WH2	Similar to WH1 athletes, WH2 athletes have one or more impairments in their lower limbs, one or more loss of legs (above the knee) and would have minimal or no trunk impairment and/or lower . They would move their wheelchairs quicker than WH1 athletes and they will hold onto their wheels less to maintain their balance.
SL3	Athletes would have impairment in one or both lower limbs and have poor walking/running balance: to reduce their impairment, they would often compete on half-court (lengthwise). These athletes would have cerebral palsy, bilateral polio or loss of both legs below the knee.
SL4	Athletes would run faster and have better balance than athletes who are in the SL3 class, they would have an impairment in one or both lower limbs, unilateral polio or mild cerebral palsy. These athletes would play on full-court.
SU5	Unlike the SL3 and SL4 sport classes, SU5 have impairments in their upper limbs such as a missing thumb which restricts grip and power of the stroke or loss of an arm due to amputation or nerve damage. Also, athletes may have a severe impairment to their non-playing arm which can affect balance movements, trunk rotation and ability to serve.
SH6	Athletes who have achondroplasia and short stature.

== Medal summary ==
* Host nation (Indonesia)

Rank	Nation	Gold	Silver	Bronze	Total
1	Indonesia (INA)*	13	9	8	30
2	Thailand (THA)	3	8	9	20
3	Malaysia (MAS)	3	1	4	8
4	Philippines (PHI)	0	1	0	1
5	Vietnam (VIE)	0	0	3	3
Totals (5 entries)		19	19	24	62

== Medalists ==
=== Men ===
Event	Class	Gold	Silver	Bronze
Singles	SL3	Ukun Rukaendi; Indonesia	Maman Nurjaman; Indonesia	Bambang Usiyan Purwito; Indonesia
Singles	SL3	Ukun Rukaendi; Indonesia	Maman Nurjaman; Indonesia	Mongkhon Bunsun; Thailand
Singles	SL4	Fredy Setiawan; Indonesia	Hikmat Ramdani; Indonesia	Chawarat Kitichokwattana; Thailand
Singles	SL4	Fredy Setiawan; Indonesia	Hikmat Ramdani; Indonesia	Mohd Amin Burhanuddin; Malaysia
Singles	SU5	Cheah Liek Hou; Malaysia	Mohamad Faris Ahmad Azri; Malaysia	Dheva Anrimusthi; Indonesia
Singles	SU5	Cheah Liek Hou; Malaysia	Mohamad Faris Ahmad Azri; Malaysia	Suryo Nugroho; Indonesia
Singles	SH6	Subhan; Indonesia	Dimas Tri Aji; Indonesia	Bunthan Yaemmali; Thailand
Singles	WH1	Muhammad Ikhwan Ramli; Malaysia	Chatchai Kornpeekanok; Thailand	Anuwat Sriboran; Thailand
Singles	WH1	Muhammad Ikhwan Ramli; Malaysia	Chatchai Kornpeekanok; Thailand	Agung Widodo; Indonesia
Singles	WH2	Wiwin Adri; Indonesia	Agus Budi Utomo; Indonesia	Noor Azwan Noorlan; Malaysia
Singles	WH2	Wiwin Adri; Indonesia	Agus Budi Utomo; Indonesia	Supriadi; Indonesia
Doubles	SL3/4	Indonesia; Dwiyoko; Fredy Setiawan	Indonesia; Hary Susanto; Ukun Rukaendi	Thailand; Mongkhon Bunsun; Siripong Teamarrom
Doubles	SL3/4	Indonesia; Dwiyoko; Fredy Setiawan	Indonesia; Hary Susanto; Ukun Rukaendi	Thailand; Natthapol Chamnanwet; Chawarat Kitichokwattana
Doubles	SU5	Indonesia; Dheva Anrimusthi; Hafiz Brilliansyah Prawiranegara	Indonesia; Oddie Listyanto Putra; Suryo Nugroho	Malaysia; Mohamad Faris Ahmad Azri; Mohd Amin Burhanuddin
Doubles	SU5	Indonesia; Dheva Anrimusthi; Hafiz Brilliansyah Prawiranegara	Indonesia; Oddie Listyanto Putra; Suryo Nugroho	Malaysia; Cheah Liek Hou; Muhammad Fareez Anuar
Doubles	WH1/2	Malaysia; Muhammad Ikhwan Ramli; Noor Azwan Noorlan	Indonesia; Agung Widodo; Supriadi	Thailand; Chatchai Kornpeekanok; Aphichat Sumpradit
Doubles	WH1/2	Malaysia; Muhammad Ikhwan Ramli; Noor Azwan Noorlan	Indonesia; Agung Widodo; Supriadi	Vietnam; Hoang Manh Giang; Truong Ngoc Binh
Team standing		Indonesia; Dheva Anrimusthi; Fredy Setiawan; Hafizh Briliansyah Prawiranegara; Suryo Nugroho; Ukun Rukaendi	Thailand; Watcharaphon Chok-uthaikul; Chawarat Kitichokwattana; Pricha Somsiri; Siripong Teamarrom	not awarded

=== Women ===
Event	Class	Gold	Silver	Bronze
Singles	SL3/4	Khalimatus Sadiyah; Indonesia	Lia Priyanti; Indonesia	Chanida Srinavakul; Thailand
Singles	SU5	Warining Rahayu; Indonesia	Sudsaifon Yodpa; Thailand	not awarded
Singles	SH6	Rina Marlina; Indonesia	Chai Saeyang; Thailand	Yunia Widya Irianti; Indonesia
Singles	WH1	Piyawan Thinjun; Thailand	Wanlapa Pinchai; Thailand	not awarded
Singles	WH2	Amnouy Wetwithan; Thailand	Lita Paz Enano; Philippines	Hoang Thi Hong Thao; Vietnam
Doubles	SL3–SU5	Indonesia; Qonitah Ikhtiar; Warining Rahayu	Indonesia; Khalimatus Sadiyah; Lia Priyanti	Thailand; Nipada Saensupa; Chanida Srinavakul

=== Mixed ===
Event	Class	Gold	Silver	Bronze
Doubles	SL3–SU5	Indonesia; Fredy Setiawan; Khalimatus Sadiyah	Thailand; Siripong Teamarrom; Nipada Saensupa	Indonesia; Khoirur Roziqin; Warining Rahayu
Doubles	SH6	Indonesia; Subhan; Rina Marlina	Thailand; Bunthan Yaemmali; Chai Saeyang	Indonesia; Dimas Tri Aji; Yunia Widya Irianti
Doubles	WH1/2	Thailand; Chatchai Kornpeekanok; Amnouy Wetwithan	Thailand; Dumnern Junthong; Piyawan Thinjun	Vietnam; Hoang Manh Giang; Hoang Thi Hong Thao

== See also ==
- Badminton at the 2021 Southeast Asian Games
