= Archery at the 2022 ASEAN Para Games =

- Venue: Kota Barat Field
- Date: 31 July – 5 August 2022

Archery at the 2022 ASEAN Para Games was held at synthetic turf field at the Kota Barat Field in Surakarta, Indonesia.

Originally set to be host by Vietnam in 2021, the Games were initially cancelled due to the COVID-19 pandemic in Vietnam before hosting rights were transferred to Indonesia. It is also originally scheduled from 23 to 30 July 2022, later moved to 30 July to 6 August 2022.

== Medal summary ==
=== Medal table ===
* Host nation (Indonesia)

Rank	Nation	Gold	Silver	Bronze	Total
1	Thailand (THA)	4	4	0	8
2	Indonesia (INA)*	3	3	4	10
3	Malaysia (MAS)	2	1	1	4
4	Singapore (SGP)	1	0	0	1
5	Philippines (PHI)	0	1	1	2
6	Myanmar (MYA)	0	0	1	1
Totals (6 entries)		10	9	7	26

=== Medalists ===
Recurve

Event	Gold	Silver	Bronze
Men's individual	Indonesia (INA); Setiawan	Thailand (THA); Hanreuchai Netsiri	Indonesia (INA); Kholidin
Women's individual	Thailand (THA); Phattharapon Pattawaeo	Indonesia (INA); Mahda Aulia	Indonesia (INA); Wahyu Retno Wulandari
Men's doubles	Indonesia (INA); Kholidin; Setiawan	Thailand (THA); Hanreuchai Netsiri; Pornchai Phimthong	Malaysia (MAS); Nurfaizal Bin Hamzah; Suresh Selvatamby
Women's doubles	Indonesia (INA); Wahyu Retno Wulandari; Mahda Aulia	Not awarded	Not awarded
Mixed team	Thailand (THA); Hanreuchai Netsiri; Phattharapon Pattawaeo	Indonesia (INA); Kholidin; Mahda Aulia	Not awarded

Compound

Event	Gold	Silver	Bronze
Men's individual	Thailand (THA); Sakon Inkaew	Malaysia (MAS); Daneshen Govinda Rajan	Indonesia (INA); Ken Swagumilang
Men's doubles	Malaysia (MAS); Wiro Julin; Daneshen Rajan	Philippines (PHI); Marcel Burgos; Angelo Manangdang	Indonesia (INA); Muhamad Ali; Ken Swagumilang
Women's individual	Singapore (SGP); Nur Syahidah Binte Alim	Thailand (THA); Praphaporn Homjanthuek	Myanmar (MYA); Sein Phwat
Women's doubles	Thailand (THA); Phannibha Srathongmaew; Praphaporn Homjanthuek	Indonesia (INA); Tuwariyah; Irma Yunita	Not awarded
Mixed team	Malaysia (MAS); Nor Jannaton; Daneshen Rajan	Thailand (THA); Praphaporn Homjanthuek; Comsan Singpirom	Philippines (PHI); Augustina Bantiloc; Marcel Burgos

== Men's Individual Recurve ==
=== Finals ===
Round of 16
Nurfaizal Bin Hamzah (MAS)	0
Sadikin (INA)	6
Gorospe Michael (PHI)	6
Ly Cuong (VIE)	4
Pornchai Phimthong (THA)	6
Paitoon Pimpisan (THA)	0
Ola Giovanni (PHI)	6
William Cablog (PHI)	0

Quarterfinals
Hanreuchai Netsiri (THA)	6
Sadikin (INA)	0
Kholidin (INA)	6
Gorospe Michael (PHI)	0
Setiawan (INA)	6
Pornchai Phimthong (THA)	4
Suresh Selvatamby (MAS)	6
Ola Giovanni (PHI)	2

Semi-finals
Hanreuchai Netsiri (THA)	6
Kholidin (INA)	4
Setiawan (INA)	6
Suresh Selvatamby (MAS)	4

Final
Setiawan (INA) (gold)	6
Hanreuchai Netsiri (THA) (silver)	2
Third place
Kholidin (INA) (bronze)	6
Suresh Selvatamby (MAS)	2

== Women's Individual Recurve ==
=== Ranking round ===
Rank	Archer	Nation	Score
1	Phattharaphon Pattawaeo	Thailand	560
2	Mahda Aulia	Indonesia	557
3	Tpat Chatyotsakorn	Thailand	526
4	Elizabeth Bayla	Philippines	502
5	Wahyu Retno Wulandari	Indonesia	482
6	Sri Hartatik	Indonesia	457

=== Finals ===
Quarterfinals
3	Tpat Chatyotsakorn (THA)	6
6	Sri Hartatik (INA)	2
2	Wahyu Retno Wulandari (INA)	7
4	Elizabeth Bayla (PHI)	1

Semi-finals
2	Mahda Aulia (INA)	6
3	Tpat Chatyotsakorn (THA)	4
1	Phattharaphon Pattawaeo (THA)	6
5	Wahyu Retno Wulandari (INA)	2

Final
2	Mahda Aulia (INA) (silver)	2
1	Phattharaphon Pattawaeo (THA) (gold)	6
Third place
5	Wahyu Retno Wulandari (INA) (bronze)	6
3	Tpat Chatyotsakorn (THA)	4

== See also ==
- Archery at the 2021 Southeast Asian Games
