= Philippines at the 2022 ASEAN Para Games =

- IPC code: PHI
- NPC: Paralympic Committee of the Philippines

in Surakarta
- Competitors: 144 in 14 sports
- Flag bearer: Achelle Guion (powerlifting)
- Medals: Gold 28 Silver 30 Bronze 46 Total 104

ASEAN Para Games appearances (overview)
- 2001; 2003; 2005; 2008; 2009; 2011; 2013; 2015; 2017; 2020; 2022; 2023; 2025

The Philippines competed at the 2022 ASEAN Para Games in Surakarta, Indonesia. Originally scheduled to take place in Vietnam in 2021, The games were planned amidst the COVID-19 pandemic, posing logistical challenges in organizing the event.

Originally scheduled to be held from 17 to 23 December 2021, games were cancelled in October 2021 after the 2021 Southeast Asian Games was postponed to May 2022 due to the pandemic.

The delegation which consist of 144 athletes, 38 coaches and 40 officials is led by chef de mission Walter Torres.

== Medalists ==
=== Gold ===
No.	Medal	Name	Sport	Event	Date
1	Gold	Ernie Gawilan	Swimming	Men's 400m Freestyle S7 TF	August 1
2	Gold	Roland Sabido	Swimming	Men's 400m Freestyle S9	August 1
3	Gold	Cendy Asusano	Athletics	Women's Javelin Throw F54	August 1
4	Gold	Jerrold Mangliwan	Athletics	Men's 100m T52	August 1
5	Gold	Angel Otom	Swimming	Women's 50m Backstroke S5	August 1
6	Gold	King James Reyes	Athletics	Men's 5000m T46	August 2
7	Gold	Ariel Alegarbes	Swimming	Men's 100m Backstroke S14	August 2
8	Gold	Ariel Alegarbes	Swimming	Men's 50m Butterfly S14	August 2
9	Gold	Jesebel Tordecilla	Athletics	Women's Javelin Throw F55	August 2
10	Gold	Sander Severino	Chess	Men's Individual Standard PI	August 2
11	Gold	Henry Roger Lopez; Jasper Rom; Sander Severino	Chess	Men's Team Event Standard PI	August 2
12	Gold	Menandro Redor	Chess	Men's Individual B2	August 2
13	Gold	Darry Bernardo; Menandro Redor; Arman Subaste	Chess	Men's Team Event Standard B2	August 2
14	Gold	Cendy Asusano	Athletics	Women's Shot Put F54	August 3
15	Gold	Jerrold Mangliwan	Athletics	Men's 400m T52	August 4
16	Gold	Angel Otom	Swimming	Women's 50m Butterfly S5	August 4
17	Gold	Ernie Gawilan	Swimming	Men's 200m Individual Medley SM7	August 4
18	Gold	Marco Tinamisan	Swimming	Men's 50m Freestyle S3	August 4
19	Gold	Angel Otom	Swimming	Women's 50m Freestyle S5	August 4
20	Gold	Sander Severino	Chess	Men's Individual Rapid PI	August 4
21	Gold	Henry Roger Lopez; Jasper Rom; Sander Severino	Chess	Men's Team Rapid PI	August 4
22	Gold	Marco Tinamisan	Swimming	Men's 100m Freestyle S3	August 5
23	Gold	Gary Bejino	Swimming	Men's 100m Freestyle S6	August 5
24	Gold	Ariel Alegarbes	Swimming	Men's 50m Freestyle S14	August 5
25	Gold	Cheyzer Crystal Mendoza	Chess	Women's Individual Blitz P1	August 5
26	Gold	Cheryl Angot; Cheyzer Crystal Mendoza; Jean-Lee Nacita	Chess	Women's Team Blitz P1	August 5
27	Gold	Darry Bernardo	Chess	Men's Individual Blitz B2	August 5
28	Gold	Darry Bernardo; Menandro Redor; Arman Subaste	Chess	Men's Team Blitz B2	August 5

=== Silver ===
No.	Medal	Name	Sport	Event	Date
1	Silver	Alfie Quiñones Cabañog; John Rey Escalante; Rene Macabenguil; Kenneth Christopher Tapia; Cleford Trocino	Wheelchair basketball	Men's 3x3	July 31
2	Silver	Arnel Aba	Swimming	Men's 400m Freestyle S9	August 1
3	Silver	Achelle Guion	Powerlifting	Women's 45 kg ― Rank	August 1
4	Silver	Achelle Guion	Powerlifting	Women's 45 kg ― Total	August 1
5	Silver	Rodrigo Podiotan Jr.	Athletics	Men's 100m T52	August 1
6	Silver	Jolan Camacho	Athletics	Men's Long Jump F11/12	August 1
7	Silver	Rosalie Torrefiel	Athletics	Women's Javelin Throw F11-13	August 2
8	Silver	Ernie Gawilan	Swimming	Men's 100m Backstroke S7	August 2
9	Silver	Arman Subaste	Chess	Men's Individual B2	August 2
10	Silver	Francis Ching	Chess	Men's Individual B1	August 2
11	Silver	Anthony Abogado; Cecilio Bilog; Francis Ching	Chess	Men's Team B1	August 2
12	Silver	Cheyzer Crystal Mendoza	Chess	Women's Individual P1	August 2
13	Silver	Cheryl Angot; Fe Mangayayam; Cheyzer Crystal Mendoza	Chess	Women's Team P1	August 2
14	Silver	Roland Sabido	Swimming	Men's 100m Backstroke S9	August 3
15	Silver	Gary Bejino	Swimming	Men's 50m Butterfly S6	August 4
16	Silver	Russel Cundangan; Mary Ann Taquinod	Judo	Women's Team J1-J2	August 4
17	Silver	Gary Bejino	Swimming	Men's 50m Freestyle S6	August 4
18	Silver	Ma. Ravinia Carpena	Athletics	Women's Shot Put F20	August 4
19	Silver	Jasper Rom	Chess	Men's Rapid PI	August 4
20	Silver	Darry Bernardo; Israel Peligro; Menandro Redor	Chess	Men's Rapid Team B2	August 4
21	Silver	Adeline Dumapong	Powerlifting	Women's 86 kg ― Rank	August 4
22	Silver	Adeline Dumapong	Powerlifting	Women's 86 kg ― Total	August 4
23	Silver	Marcel Burgos; Angelo Manangdang	Archery	Men's Compound Doubles	August 5
24	Silver	Andrew Kevin Arandia	Table tennis	Men's Singles Class 9	August 5
25	Silver	Mark Vincent Aguilar; Alfie Quiñones Cabañog; Jannil Cañete; Kyle Carlo Carandang; John Rey Escalante; Moises Escobar; Jefferson Legacion; Rene Macabenguil; Freddie Magdayo; Marlon Nacita; Kenneth Christopher Tapia; Cleford Trocino	Wheelchair basketball	Men's 5x5	August 5
26	Silver	Sander Severino	Chess	Men's Individual Blitz PI	August 5
27	Silver	Felix Aguilera; Henry Roger Lopez; Sander Severino	Chess	Men's Team Blitz PI	August 5
28	Silver	Francis Ching	Chess	Men's Individual Blitz B1	August 5
29	Silver	Cecilio Bilog; Francis Ching; Rodolfo Sarmiento	Chess	Men's Team Blitz B1	August 5
30	Silver	Lita Paz Enano	Badminton	Women's Singles WH2	August 5

=== Bronze ===
No.	Medal	Name	Sport	Event	Date
1	Bronze	Daniel Enderes Jr.	Athletics	Men's 5000m T20	August 1
2	Bronze	Edwin Villanueva	Swimming	Men's 400m Freestyle	August 1
3	Bronze	Smith Billy Cartera; Racleo Martinez Jr. Darwin Salvacion	Table tennis	Men's TT4	August 1
4	Bronze	Jesebel Tordecilla	Athletics	Women's Discus Throw F55	August 1
5	Bronze	Jobert Lumanta; Jayson Ocampo	Table tennis	Men's Doubles TM8	August 1
6	Bronze	Arman Dino	Athletics	Men's 100m T47	August 1
7	Bronze	Joel Balatucan	Athletics	Men's Shot Put F55	August 1
8	Bronze	Marydol Pamati-an	Powerlifting	Women's 41 kg ― Rank	August 1
9	Bronze	Marydol Pamati-an	Powerlifting	Women's 41 kg ― Total	August 1
10	Bronze	Arnel Aba; Ernie Gawilan; Roland Sabido; Muhaimin Ulag	Swimming	Men's 4 × 100 m Freestyle Relay	August 1
11	Bronze	Denesia Esnara	Powerlifting	Women's 50 kg ― Rank	August 1
12	Bronze	Denesia Esnara	Powerlifting	Women's 50 kg ― Total	August 1
13	Bronze	Cendy Asusano	Athletics	Women's Discus Throw F54	August 2
14	Bronze	Ronn Russel Mitra	Athletics	Men's Long Jump T20	August 2
15	Bronze	Evaristo Carbonel	Athletics	Men's Discus Throw F11-13	August 2
16	Bronze	Arvie John Arreglado	Athletics	Men's 200m T47	August 2
17	Bronze	Jesebel Tordecilla	Athletics	Women's Shot Put F55	August 2
18	Bronze	Romeo Tayawa	Powerlifting	Men's 54 kg ― Rank	August 2
19	Bronze	Romeo Tayawa	Powerlifting	Men's 54 kg ― Total	August 2
20	Bronze	Darry Bernardo	Chess	Men's Men's Individual B2	August 2
21	Bronze	Theresa Bilog; Corazon Lucero; Charmaine Tonic	Chess	Women's Team Standard B2	August 2
22	Bronze	King James Reyes	Athletics	Men's 1500m T46	August 3
23	Bronze	Marites Burce	Athletics	Women's Shot Put F54	August 3
24	Bronze	Andy Avellana	Athletics	Men's High Jump T42/T63	August 3
25	Bronze	Arnel Aba	Swimming	Men's 100 Butterfly S9	August 3
26	Bronze	Deterson Omas	Judo	Men's 60 kg J1	August 3
27	Bronze	Minnie Der Cadag; Pablo Catalan Jr.	Table tennis	Mixed Doubles 10	August 3
28	Bronze	Andrew Arandia; Benedicto Gaela	Table tennis	Men's Doubles TM9	August 3
29	Bronze	Pablo Catalan Jr. Linard Sultan	Table tennis	Men's Doubles TM9	August 3
30	Bronze	Russel Cundangan	Judo	Women's +57 kg J1-J2	August 3
31	Bronze	Minnie Der Cadag; Mary Eloise Sable	Table tennis	Women's Doubles Class 10	August 3
32	Bronze	Smith Billy Cartera; Racleo Martinez Jr.	Table tennis	Men's Doubles Class 4	August 3
33	Bronze	Rodrigo Podiotan Jr.	Athletics	Men's 400m T52	August 4
34	Bronze	Jobert Lumanta; Jayson Ocampo	Table tennis	Men's Double's Class 8	August 4
35	Bronze	Edwin Villanueva	Swimming	Men's 200m Individual Medley SM8	August 4
36	Bronze	Arnel Aba	Swimming	Men's 200m Individual Medley SM9	August 4
37	Bronze	Darry Bernardo	Chess	Men's Individual Rapid B2	August 4
38	Bronze	Mary Eloise Sable	Table tennis	Women's Singles Class 10	August 4
39	Bronze	Theresa Bilog; Corazon Lucero; Charmaine Tonic	Chess	Women's Team Rapid B2	August 4
40	Bronze	Nikki Vidal	Powerlifting	Women's 86 kg ― Rank	August 4
41	Bronze	Nikki Vidal	Powerlifting	Women's 86 kg ― Total	August 4
42	Bronze	Arvie John Arreglado	Athletics	Men's Long Jump T47	August 5
43	Bronze	Augustina Bantiloc; Marcel Burgos	Archery	Mixed Compound Team	August 5
44	Bronze	Benedicto Gaela	Table tennis	Men's Singles Class 9	August 5
45	Bronze	Linard Sultan	Table tennis	Men's Singles Class 9	August 5
46	Bronze	Henry Roger Lopez	Chess	Men's Individual Blitz PI	August 5

== Multiple Medalists ==
Name	Sport	Gold	Silver	Bronze	Total
Sander Severino	Chess	4	2	0	6
Darry Bernardo	Chess	3	1	2	6
Menandro Redor	Chess	3	1	0	4
Ariel Alegarbes	Swimming	3	0	0	3
Angel Otom	Swimming	3	0	0	3
Cheyzer Crystal Mendoza	Chess	2	2	0	4
Ernie Gawilan	Swimming	2	1	1	4
Henry Roger Lopez	Chess	2	1	1	4
Jasper Rom	Chess	2	1	0	3
Arman Subaste	Chess	2	1	0	3
Cendy Asusano	Athletics	2	0	1	3
Jerrold Mangliwan	Athletics	2	0	0	2
Marco Tinamisan	Swimming	2	0	0	2
Gary Bejino	Swimming	1	2	0	3
Roland Sabido	Swimming	1	1	1	3
Cheryl Angot	Chess	1	1	0	2
Jesebel Tordecilla	Athletics	1	0	2	3
King James Reyes	Athletics	1	0	1	2
Francis Ching	Chess	0	4	0	4
Cecilio Bilog	Chess	0	2	0	2
Alfie Quiñones Cabañog	Wheelchair Basketball	0	2	0	2
John Rey Escalante	Wheelchair Basketball	0	2	0	2
Rene Macabenguil	Wheelchair Basketball	0	2	0	2
Kenneth Christopher Tapia	Wheelchair Basketball	0	2	0	2
Cleford Trocino	Wheelchair Basketball	0	2	0	2
Arnel Aba	Swimming	0	1	3	4
Marcel Burgos	Archery	0	1	1	2
Russel Cundangan	Judo	0	1	1	2
Rodrigo Podiotan Jr.	Athletics	0	1	1	2
Arvie John Arreglado	Athletics	0	0	2	2
Theresa Bilog	Chess	0	0	2	2
Minnie Der Cadag	Table Tennis	0	0	2	2
Smith Billy Cartera	Table Tennis	0	0	2	2
Pablo Catalan Jr.	Table Tennis	0	0	2	2
Denesia Esnara	Powerlifting	0	0	2	2
Benedicto Gaela	Table Tennis	0	0	2	2
Racleo Martinez Jr.	Table Tennis	0	0	2	2
Corazon Lucero	Chess	0	0	2	2
Jobert Lumanda	Table Tennis	0	0	2	2
Jayson Ocampo	Table Tennis	0	0	2	2
Mary Eloise Sable	Table Tennis	0	0	2	2
Linard Sultan	Table Tennis	0	0	2	2
Charmaine Tonic	Chess	0	0	2	2
Edwin Villanueva	Swimming	0	0	2	2

== Medal summary ==
=== Medal by sport ===
Medals by sport
Sport	1st place, gold medalist(s)	2nd place, silver medalist(s)	3rd place, bronze medalist(s)	Total	Rank
Swimming	12	5	5	22	
Chess	10	11	5	26	
Athletics	6	4	14	24	
Powerlifting	0	4	8	12	
Wheelchair basketball	0	2	0	2	
Table tennis	0	1	11	12	
Blind judo	0	1	2	3	
Archery	0	1	1	2	
Badminton	0	1	0	1	
Total	28	30	46	104	

=== Medal by date ===
Medals by date
Day	Date	1st place, gold medalist(s)	2nd place, silver medalist(s)	3rd place, bronze medalist(s)	Total
0	30 July	Opening ceremony			
1	31 July	0	1	0	1
2	1 August	5	7	10	22
3	2 August	8	6	8	22
4	3 August	1	2	11	14
5	4 August	7	7	8	22
6	5 August	7	8	5	20
Total		28	31	42	101

== Wheelchair basketball ==
=== 5x5 basketball ===
Team	Event	Group Stage				Final / BM	Rank
Team	Event	Opposition Score	Opposition Score	Opposition Score	Rank	Opposition Score	Rank
Philippines men's	Men's tournament	Cambodia; W 89–31	Thailand; L 39–91	Indonesia; W 61–30	2	Thailand; L 36–87	2nd place, silver medalist(s)
Philippines women's	Women's tournament	Laos; L 6–63	Thailand; L 13–63	Cambodia; L 23–56	4	Laos; L 9–58	4

=== 3x3 basketball ===
The Philippine men's 3x3 began their campaign with a 15–10 over host Indonesia and which was followed by a lost to Thailand and a win against Cambodia the following day. The men's team advance to the gold medal match but settled for silver in a second game against Thailand. The women's team on the other hand lost their first two games to Thailand and Laos on the first day of competition. The team failed to win over Laos in the bronze medal game.

Team	Event	Group Stage				Final / BM	Rank
Team	Event	Opposition Score	Opposition Score	Opposition Score	Rank	Opposition Score	Rank
Philippines men's	Men's tournament	Indonesia; W 15–10	Thailand; L 7–21	Cambodia; W 20–4	2	Thailand; L 12–21	2nd place, silver medalist(s)
Philippines women's	Women's tournament	Thailand; L 0–11	Laos; L 1–6	Cambodia; L 0–18	4	Laos; L 0–4	4

== Powerlifting ==
The Philippines entered three athletes for Powerlifting.

Athlete	Event	Total lifted	Rank
Marydol Pamati-an	Women's -41 kg	(bronze); 155	3rd place, bronze medalist(s)
Achelle Guion	Women's -45 kg	(silver); 70	2nd place, silver medalist(s)
Denesia Esnara	Women's -50 kg	(bronze); 168	3rd place, bronze medalist(s)
