= Abu Samah Borhan =

Malaysian wheelchair tennis player (born 1985)

- Country (sports): Malaysia
- Born: 27 February 1985 (age 40) Malaysia
Medal record
Men's wheelchair tennis
Representing Malaysia
Asian Para Games
Silver medal – second place	2022 Hangzhou	Men's doubles
ASEAN Para Games
Gold medal – first place	2017 Kuala Lumpur	Men's singles
Silver medal – second place	2017 Kuala Lumpur	Men's doubles

Abu Samah bin Borhan (born 27 February 1985) is a Malaysian wheelchair tennis player.
