= 2022 ASEAN Para Games =

11th ASEAN Para Games

XI ASEAN Para Games
- Host city: Surakarta, Indonesia
- Motto: Striving for Equality (Note: Only the English version of the motto were used during the Games. There is no Indonesian equivalent of the motto adopted.)
- Nations: 11
- Athletes: 1248
- Events: 455 in 14 sports
- Opening: 30 July
- Closing: 6 August
- Opened by: Ma'ruf Amin; Vice President of Indonesia
- Closed by: Joko Widodo; President of Indonesia
- Athlete's Oath: Suryo Nugroho
- Judge's Oath: Rochana Dwiningsih
- Torch lighter: Hanik Puji Astuti
- Main venue: Manahan Stadium
- Website: 2022 ASEAN Para Games

The 2022 ASEAN Para Games, officially known as the 11th ASEAN Para Games, and commonly known as Surakarta 2022 (or Solo 2022), was a biannual multi-sport event for athletes with physical disabilities in Southeast Asia. It was held from 30 July to 6 August 2022 in Surakarta, Indonesia. All 11 countries in the region participated.

Originally set to be hosted by Vietnam in 2021, the Games were initially cancelled due to the COVID-19 pandemic just before its hosting rights were transferred to Indonesia. It is also originally scheduled from 23 to 30 July 2022, later moved to 30 July to 6 August 2022.

== Development and preparation ==
=== Host selection ===
Originally the 2021 ASEAN Para Games was intended to be held in Vietnam, the same host nation as the 2021 Southeast Asian Games. The games were planned amidst the COVID-19 pandemic in Vietnam, posing logistical challenges in organizing the event.

Originally scheduled to be held from 17 to 23 December 2021, games were cancelled in October, as they planned after the 2021 SEA Games was postponed to May 2022 due to the pandemic. This would have been the second time Vietnam would have hosted the games, last staging them in 2003.

Malaysia and Indonesia expressed willingness to host the games in place of Vietnam. The Philippines has also supported moving the games to a country willing to host the games in a minor scale than the original.

In January 2022, Surakarta in Indonesia was announced as the host for the games. However, the host city contract could not be immediately signed due to World Anti-Doping Agency (WADA) sanctions in effect at the time. The hosting rights was only formally awarded to Indonesia on 16 February 2022 after the sanctions were lifted.

=== Venues ===
Almost all of the 2022 ASEAN Para Games held in Greater Solo (11 in Surakarta, 2 in Karanganyar). Originally, swimming also will be held in Karanganyar, but later moved to Semarang due to lack of preparation.

City	Competition Venue	Sports
Surakarta	Manahan Sports Complex
Surakarta	Manahan Stadium	Athletics
Surakarta	Manahan tennis court	Wheelchair tennis
Surakarta	Sebelas Maret University (UNS Solo)
Surakarta	UNS Sports Hall, Faculty of Sports	Goalball, Boccia
Surakarta	UNS Stadium	Football 7-a-side
Surakarta	Others
Surakarta	Muhammadiyah University of Surakarta Edutorium	Badminton
Surakarta	Solo Paragon Hotel	Powerlifting
Surakarta	Solo Techno Park	Table tennis
Surakarta	Kota Barat Field	Archery
Surakarta	Tirtonadi Convention Hall	Judo
Surakarta	Sritex Arena Sports Hall	Wheelchair basketball
Karanganyar	Lorin Hotel	Chess
Karanganyar	Tunas Pembangunan University Sports Hall	Sitting volleyball
Semarang	Jatidiri Sports Complex	Swimming

== The Games ==
=== Participating nations ===
All 11 members of ASEAN Para Sports Federation (APSF) took part in the 2022 ASEAN Para Games.

- Brunei (20)
- Cambodia (252)
- Indonesia (268) (Host)
- Laos (44)
- Malaysia (73)
- Myanmar (83)
- Philippines (172)
- Singapore (26)
- Thailand (260)
- Timor-Leste (15)
- Vietnam (128)

=== Sports ===
The ASEAN Para Sports Federation in December 2021 agreed to organize events for 11 sports for the 2021 Para Games then scheduled to be hosted in Vietnam. CP football, cycling, sitting volleyball, and wheelchair basketball were proposed but due budget reasons they were dropped from the program. When Indonesia was named new host, all but cycling were proposed to be held again.

2022 ASEAN Para Games Sporting Programmes

- Archery
- Athletics
- Badminton
- Boccia
- Chess

- Football 7-a-side
- Goalball
- Judo
- Powerlifting
- Sitting volleyball

- Swimming
- Table tennis
- Wheelchair basketball
- Wheelchair tennis

=== Medal table ===
* Host nation (Indonesia)

2022 ASEAN Para Games medal table
Rank	Nation	Gold	Silver	Bronze	Total
1	Indonesia*	175	144	107	426
2	Thailand	117	113	88	318
3	Vietnam	65	62	55	182
4	Malaysia	36	20	13	69
5	Philippines	28	30	46	104
6	Myanmar	14	12	17	43
7	Cambodia	7	10	11	28
8	Singapore	7	9	11	27
9	Timor-Leste	5	2	5	12
10	Brunei	1	0	3	4
11	Laos	0	2	7	9
Totals (11 entries)		455	404	363	1,222

== Notes ==
Preceded by Kuala Lumpur (2017); Philippines (2020) (cancelled)	ASEAN Para Games; Surakarta; XI ASEAN Para Games (2022)	Succeeded by Phnom Penh
