= Eye on the Ball =

2020 Malaysian documentary

- Directed by: Chen Yih Wen
- Starring: Sunny Shalesh; Asri Arshad; Azwan Azhar; Rollen Marakim
- Distributed by: Astro Shaw; TGV Pictures
- Release dates: November 22, 2019 (SGIFF); August 20, 2020 (Astro First)
- Running time: 1 hour 20 minutes
- Country: Malaysia
- Languages: English, Malay

Eye on the Ball is a 2019 Malaysian sports documentary film. It tells the true story of Malaysia's national blind football team, and their journey in the 2017 ASEAN Para Games. It was released at Astro First on 20 August 2020.

== Synopsis ==
The documentary follows Malaysia's national blind football team, known as Harimau Buta (Blind Tigers), and details the lives of four individuals: players Asri, Kenchot and Rollen, along with their coach, Sunny Shalesh. After winning gold in the 2015 ASEAN Para Games, the team hopes to defend their championships title in the 2017 ASEAN Para Games and also qualify for the World Blind Football Championships.

== Cast ==
- Sunny Shalesh, coach
- Asri Arshad, player
- Azwan Azhar, player
- Rollen Maraki, player

== See also ==
- Football 5-a-side at the 2017 ASEAN Para Games
- Football 7-a-side at the 2017 ASEAN Para Games
- Football 5-a-side at the 2015 ASEAN Para Games
- Football 7-a-side at the 2015 ASEAN Para Games
