= CP football at the ASEAN Para Games =

Football 7-a-side at the ASEAN Para Games is an event of CP football at the ASEAN Para Games.

== Results ==
| Year | Host | Winner | Score | Runner-up | Third place | Score | Fourth place | Number of teams | Ref. |
|---|---|---|---|---|---|---|---|---|---|
| 2014; Details | (Myanmar); Naypyidaw | Myanmar | Round robin | Singapore | Thailand | Round robin | Malaysia | 4 | |
IFCPF tournaments
| 2015; Details | Singapore | Thailand | 3–0 | Myanmar | Singapore | 2–1 | Malaysia | 5 | |
| 2017; Details | (Malaysia); Kuala Lumpur | Indonesia | 3–0 | Thailand | Malaysia | 4–0 | Singapore | 6 | |
| 2022; Details | (Indonesia); Surakarta | Thailand | (6) 2–2 (5) (a.e.t) | Indonesia | Myanmar | 9–0 | Cambodia | 4 (Note: All four semifinalists competed in the preliminary round. Malaysia, Singapore, and the Philippines did not enter) | |
| 2023; Details | (Cambodia); Phnom Penh | Malaysia | (3) 0–0 (1) (a.e.t) | Indonesia | Thailand | 3-2 | Myanmar | 6 | |
| 2025; Details | (Thailand); Nakhon Ratchasima | Thailand | 1–0 | Myanmar | Indonesia | 7-0 | Malaysia | | |

- a.e.t.: after extra time
- p: after penalty shoot-out
