= Dararat Asayut =

Thai para table tennis player (born 1984)

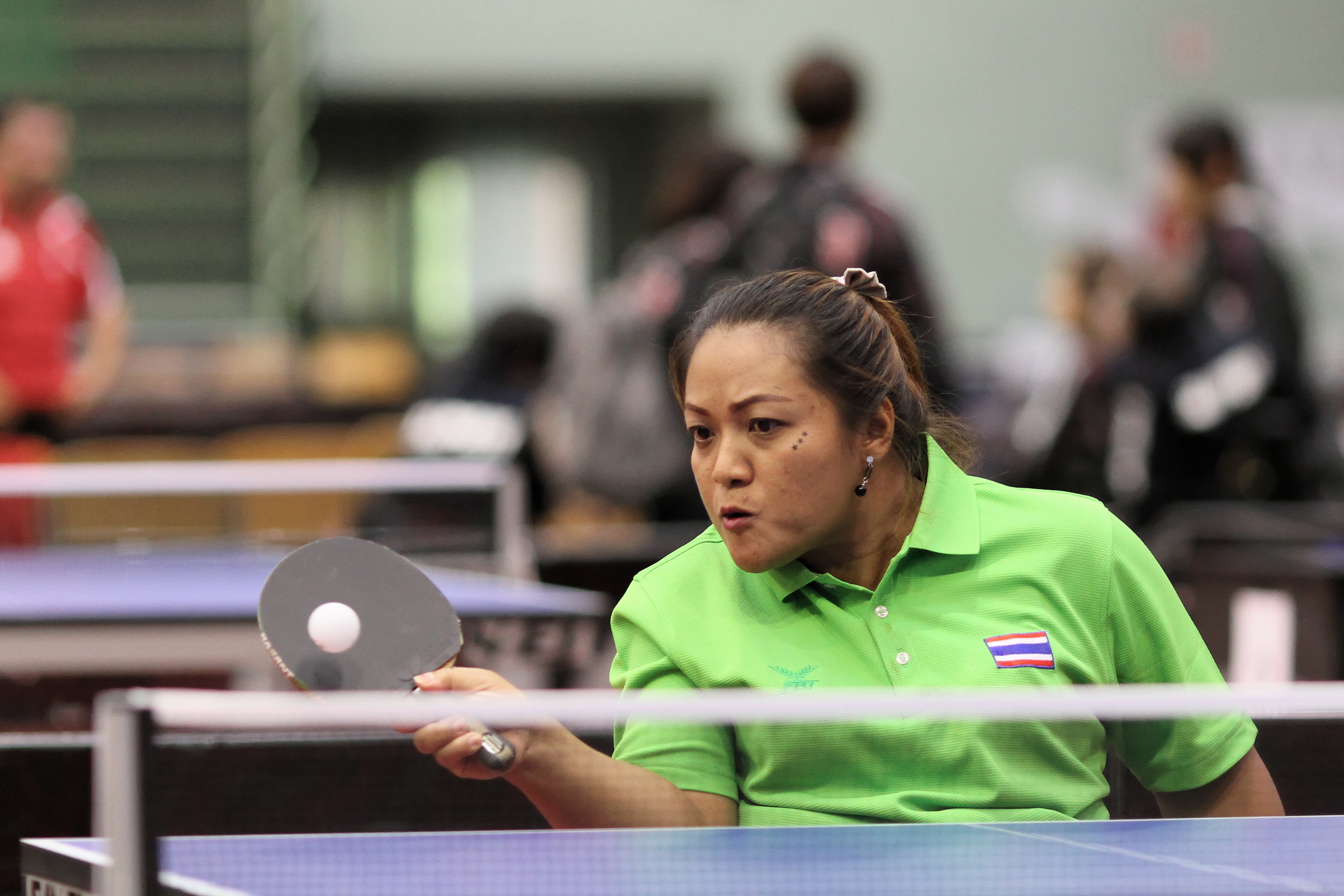

Personal information
- Nationality: Thai
- Born: 18 June 1984 (age 42) Chaiyaphum, Thailand

Sport
- Sport: Para table tennis
- Disability class: C3
Medal record
Para table tennis
Representing Thailand
Paralympic Games
Bronze medal – third place	2024 Paris	Women's doubles WD5
Asian Para Games
Gold medal – first place	2018 Jakarta	Women's doubles C3–5
Gold medal – first place	2018 Jakarta	Mixed doubles C2–3
Bronze medal – third place	2014 Incheon	Singles C1–3
Bronze medal – third place	2014 Incheon	Team C1–3
Bronze medal – third place	2022 Hangzhou	Singles C3
ASEAN Para Games
Gold medal – first place	2015 Singapore	Singles C3
Gold medal – first place	2015 Singapore	Doubles C1-5
Gold medal – first place	2015 Singapore	Team C1-5
Gold medal – first place	2017 Kuala Lumpur	Singles C1–3
Gold medal – first place	2017 Kuala Lumpur	Team C1–5
Gold medal – first place	2023 Phnom Penh	Singles C3
Gold medal – first place	2023 Phnom Penh	Doubles C1-3
Gold medal – first place	2023 Phnom Penh	Team C1-3
Silver medal – second place	2023 Phnom Penh	Mixed doubles C1-3

Dararat Asayut (born 18 June 1984) is a Thai para table tennis player. She represented Thailand at the 2016, 2020 and 2024 Summer Paralympics.

== Career ==
Asayut competed at the 2018 Asian Para Games in table tennis and won gold medals in the women's doubles C3–5 and mixed doubles C2–3 events.

She represented Thailand at the 2024 Summer Paralympics in the women's doubles WD5 event, along with Chilchitparyak Bootwansirina, and won a bronze medal.
