= Wijittra Jaion =

Thai para table tennis player (born 1989)

Personal information
- Born: 5 August 1989 (age 36) Ratchaburi, Thailand
- Height: 157 cm (5 ft 2 in)

Sport
- Country: Thailand
- Sport: Para table tennis
Medal record
Para table tennis
Representing Thailand
Paralympic Games
Silver medal – second place	2024 Paris	Mixed doubles XD7
World Championships
Gold medal – first place	2022 Granada	Singles C4
Silver medal – second place	2022 Granada	Mixed doubles C10
Bronze medal – third place	2022 Granada	Women's doubles C10
Asian Championships
Silver medal – second place	2019 Taichung	Teams C4
Bronze medal – third place	2015 Amman	Singles C4
Bronze medal – third place	2015 Amman	Teams C4-5
Bronze medal – third place	2019 Taichung	Singles C4
Asian Para Games
Bronze medal – third place	2014 Incheon	Singles C4
Bronze medal – third place	2018 Jakarta	Singles C4
Bronze medal – third place	2022 Hangzhou	Singles C4
ASEAN Para Games
Gold medal – first place	2015 Singapore	Singles C4
Gold medal – first place	2015 Singapore	Doubles C1-5
Gold medal – first place	2015 Singapore	Team C1-5
Gold medal – first place	2017 Kuala Lumpur	Singles C4

Wijittra Jaion (born 5 August 1989) is a Thai para table tennis player who competes in international table tennis tournaments. She is a World singles' champion and a three-time Asian Para Games bronze medalist.

== Career ==
She has also competed at the 2016 and 2020 Summer Paralympics where she reached the quarterfinals.

== Personal life ==
On 4 June 2002, Wijittra was a survivor of a school bus shooting on the Thai-Myanmar border which killed three children.
