= David Jacobs (table tennis) =

Indonesian table tennis player (1977–2023)

Personal information
- Full name: Dian David Mickael Jacobs
- Born: 21 June 1977 Ujung Pandang, Indonesia
- Died: 28 April 2023 (aged 45) Jakarta, Indonesia

Sport
- Sport: Table tennis
Medal record
Men's para table tennis
Representing Indonesia
Paralympic Games
Bronze medal – third place	2012 London	Individual (class 10)
Bronze medal – third place	2020 Tokyo	Individual (class 10)
World Championships
Silver medal – second place	2022 Granada	Individual (class 10)
Bronze medal – third place	2014 Beijing	Team (class 9-10)
Bronze medal – third place	2022 Granada	Mixed doubles (class 20)
Asian Para Games
Gold medal – first place	2014 Incheon	Individual (class 10)
Gold medal – first place	2018 Jakarta	Individual (class 10)
Gold medal – first place	2018 Jakarta	Doubles (class 10)
Silver medal – second place	2014 Incheon	Team (class 9-10)
Bronze medal – third place	2010 Guangzhou	Individual (class 10)
Asian Championships
Gold medal – first place	2015 Amman	Individual (class 10)
Gold medal – first place	2019 Taichung	Team (class 10)
Silver medal – second place	2013 Beijing	Individual (class 10)
Silver medal – second place	2013 Beijing	Team (class 10)
Silver medal – second place	2015 Amman	Team (class 10)
Silver medal – second place	2019 Taichung	Individual (class 10)
ASEAN Para Games
Gold medal – first place	2011 Surakarta	Individual (class 10)
Gold medal – first place	2011 Surakarta	Doubles (class 10)
Gold medal – first place	2015 Singapore	Individual (class 10)
Gold medal – first place	2017 Kuala Lumpur	Individual (class 10)
Gold medal – first place	2015 Singapore	doubles (class 10)
Gold medal – first place	2015 Singapore	team (class 10)
Gold medal – first place	2017 Kuala Lumpur	team (class 10)
Gold medal – first place	2022 Surakarta	Doubles (class 10)
Men's table tennis
SEA Games
Silver medal – second place	2005 Manila	Men's doubles
Bronze medal – third place	2007 Nakhon Ratchasima	Men's doubles
Bronze medal – third place	2009 Vientiane	Men's team

Dian David Mickael Jacobs (21 June 1977 – 28 April 2023) was an Indonesian athlete who competed in table tennis, primarily Class 10 para table tennis. Born in Ujung Pandang, he took up table tennis at the age of ten and rose quickly through national tournaments. He was training to play internationally by 2000, and in 2001 he won his first gold medal, at the SEATTA Championships in Singapore. After 2010 he competed in para table tennis, having spent most of his career competing against athletes with full functionality. Having lost control in his right hand, he decided to compete in the 2012 Summer Paralympics in London, winning a bronze medal.

== Early life ==
Jacobs was born in Ujung Pandang (now Makassar) on 21 June 1977. He was of Ambonese descent. He began playing table tennis at age ten, with the support of his parents Jan and Nell, as well as his brothers Rano, Piere, and Joe; as of 2012 his three brothers also play table tennis. In 1989 his parents registered him with the PTP Club in Semarang; in his two years with the club, he became a national champion at the elementary-school level.

When Jacobs was ready to begin his junior high school, the family moved to Jakarta. Jacobs was signed with UMS 80 Club. He continued to improve and joined the provincial team. In 1997 he was sent to Beijing to train at the Shi Cha Hai Sports School. By 2000 Jacobs was already being prepared to compete at the international level by the Indonesian Table Tennis Association. As of January 2012 Jacobs was married to Jeanny Palar, with whom he has one child.

== Table tennis career ==
While earning a degree in management from the Perbanas School of Economics, Jacobs continued training. He participated in his first Southeast Asian Games (SEA Games) in 2001. Together with Yon Mardiono, in 2001 Jacobs won Indonesia's only gold medal at the SEATTA table tennis championship in Singapore. In the men's doubles competition, they defeated the Thai duo Phucong Sanguansin and Phakphoom Sanguansin in three matches, scoring 11–4, 11–4, and 11–6. Paired with Mardiono for the first time for this tournament, Jacobs told The Jakarta Post that they "were determined not to let ourselves be dominated".

Jacobs continued to play at the SEA Games, competing in Vietnam (2003), the Philippines (2005), and Thailand (2007). He won the 2004 Pekan Olahraga Nasional competition for table tennis, which led to him receiving an honorary position at the Department of Sport; he became a full-time employee there in 2008. In 2008, Jacobs served as a coach for the Indonesian men's table tennis team, and in 2009 he competed at the SEA Games in Kuala Lumpur.

== Para table tennis career ==
Jacobs began playing in para table tennis tournaments later that year, becoming a member of the National Paralympic Committee in 2010. He competed in Class 10, which is the highest level of functionality in the system. He usually trained with opponents who maintained full functionality. Jacobs himself had a problem with one of his hands.

At the 2010 Asian Para Games in Guangzhou, China, Jacobs won a bronze medal. Before the competition, he had only a month to train. He competed in several international tournaments, winning a gold in Thailand, silver in Beijing, bronze in the Czech Republic, silver in the United Kingdom, and gold in Taiwan. At the 2011 ASEAN Para Games in Surakarta, Jacobs won seven gold medals: men's singles (open), men's doubles (open), mixed doubles (open), men's doubles, mixed doubles, team, and single. In January of the following year, Jacobs took on Indonesian president Susilo Bambang Yudhoyono in a three-game series. Although the president won one game with a score of 13–11, Jacobs took the series, winning two games with the scores of 11–7 and 11–9. After the competition, Yudhoyono gave a speech on the need to support Indonesia's disabled athletes.

In March 2012, Jacobs won two gold medals at the Protour Paratable Tennis Lignano Open in Italy. In the men's singles, he defeated Ivan Karabec of the Czech Republic with a score of 11–9, 11–7, and 11–8, while in the men's team play, he was paired with Komet Akbar and defeated teams from the Netherlands and Czech Republic. In June he won the Slovak Table Tennis Tournament, ranking him among the top three in the world.

Jacobs was one of several athletes who represented Indonesia at the 2012 Summer Paralympics in London, with Ni Nengah Widiasih (powerlifting), the swimmer Agus Ngaimin, and an athletics competitor, Setyo Budi Hartanto. Jacobs won the bronze medal in the Table Tennis Men's Individual C10 classification. It was the nation's first Paralympic medal in over twenty years.

== Death ==
On the night of 27 April 2023, Jacobs was found unconscious near Juanda-Gambir railway in Gambir, Central Jakarta. He was rushed to Husada Hospital, and died there on 28 April 2023, at the age of 45.

== Awards and nominations ==
Award	Year	Category	Result	Ref.
AORI	2012	Special Award	Placed	
Golden Award SIWO PWI	2019	Favorite Male Para Athlete	Nominated	
Golden Award SIWO PWI	2021	Best Male Para Athlete	Nominated	
Indonesian Sport Awards	2018	Favorite Male Para Athlete Individual	Nominated	
Indonesian Sport Awards	2018	Favorite Male Para Athlete Pairs with Komet Akbar	Won	
ITTF Star Awards	2015	Para Male Star	Won	
KONI Award	2013	Best Athlete	Won	

== Achievements ==
=== Paralympic Games ===
Men's singles

Year	Venue	Opponent	Score	Result	Ref
2012	ExCeL Exhibition Centre, London, Great Britain	(Spain) José Manuel Ruiz Reyes	11–9, 7–11, 11–5, 11–6	Bronze	
2020	Tokyo Metropolitan Gymnasium, Tokyo, Japan	(France) Matéo Bohéas	9–11, 8–11, 11–3, 11–5, 8–11	Bronze	

=== World Championships ===
Men's singles

Year	Venue	Opponent	Score	Result	Ref
2022	Palacio Municipal de Deportes, Granada, Spain	(Poland) Patryk Chojnowski	9–11, 9–11, 7–11	Silver	

Men's team

Year	Venue	Partner	Opponent	Score	Result	Ref
2014	Beijing, China	(Indonesia) Komet Akbar	(Poland) Patryk Chojnowski (Poland) Sebastian Powrozniak (Poland) Igor Misztal	2–3	Bronze	

Mixed doubles

Year	Venue	Partner	Opponent	Score	Result	Ref
2022	Palacio Municipal de Deportes, Granada, Spain	(Indonesia) Hana Resti	(Poland) Patryk Chojnowski (Poland) Natalia Partyka	7–11, 12–10, 9–11, 7–11	Bronze	

=== Asian Para Games ===
Men's singles

Year	Venue	Opponent	Score	Result	Ref
2010	Asian Games Town Gymnasium, Guangzhou, China	(Malaysia) Mohamad Azwar Bakar	14–12, 11–4, 11–4	Bronze	
2014	Songdo Global University Gymnasium, Incheon, South Korea	(Sri Lanka) Dinesh Deshappriya Pitiyage Don Silva	11–6, 11–5, 7–11, 11–9	Gold	
2018	Ecovention, Jakarta, Indonesia	(China) Lian Hao	11–4, 7–11, 11–6, 17–15	Gold	

Men's doubles

Year	Venue	Partner	Opponent	Score	Result	Ref
2018	Ecovention, Jakarta, Indonesia	(Indonesia) Komet Akbar	(South Korea) Shin Seung-weon (South Korea) Jung Suk-youn	11–5, 11–7	Gold	

Men's team

Year	Venue	Partner	Opponent	Score	Result	Ref
2014	Songdo Global University Gymnasium, Incheon, South Korea	(Indonesia) Komet Akbar	(China) Ge Yang (China) Ma Lin (China) Lian Hao (China) Zhao Yi Qing	0–3	Silver	

=== Asian Championships ===
Men's singles

Year	Venue	Opponent	Score	Result	Ref
2013	Beijing, China	(China) Ge Yang	8–11, 11–7, 8–11, 11–6, 5–11	Silver	
2015	Amman, Jordan	(China) Ge Yang	11–8, 4–11, 11–9, 13–11	Gold	
2019	John Paul II Stadium, Taichung, Taiwan	(Indonesia) Komet Akbar	4–11, 11–13, 11–4, 9–11	Silver	

Men's team

Year	Venue	Partner	Opponent	Score	Result	Ref
2013	Beijing, China	(Indonesia) Komet Akbar	(China) Ge Yang (China) Kong Weijie	1–3	Silver	
2015	Amman, Jordan	(Indonesia) Komet Akbar	(China) Ge Yang (China) Lian Hao	1–2	Silver	
2019	John Paul II Stadium, Taichung, Taiwan	(Indonesia) Komet Akbar	(China) Lian Hao (China) Mao Shubo	2–1	Gold	

=== SEA Games ===
Men's doubles

Year	Venue	Partner	Opponent	Score	Result	Ref
2005	Ninoy Aquino Stadium, Manila, Philippines	(Indonesia) Yon Mardiyono	(Singapore) Cai Xiaoli (Singapore) Yang Zi		Silver	
2007	Klang Plaza, Nakhon Ratchasima, Thailand	(Indonesia) Yon Mardiyono	(Singapore) Gao Ning (Singapore) Yang Zi	10–12, 11–7, 7–11, 11–7, 10–12	Bronze	

Men's team

Year	Venue	Partner	Opponent	Score	Result	Ref
2009	Convention Hall, Laos National University, Vientiane, Laos	(Indonesia) Yon Mardiyono (Indonesia) Muhammad Hussein	(Thailand) Phuchong Sanguansin (Thailand) Phakphoom Sanguansin (Thailand) Chaisit Chaitat	1–3	Bronze	

=== ASEAN Para Games ===
Men's singles

Year	Venue	Opponent	Score	Result	Ref
2011	Diamond Convention Center, Surakarta, Indonesia			Gold	
2015	OCBC Arena, Singapore	(Vietnam) Bui Quy Thu	11–7, 11–2, 11–2	Gold	
2017	Malaysian International Trade and Exhibition Centre, Kuala Lumpur, Malaysia	(Indonesia) Komet Akbar		Gold	
2022	Solo Techno Park, Surakarta, Indonesia	(Indonesia) Komet Akbar		Gold	

Men's doubles

Year	Venue	Partner	Opponent	Score	Result	Ref
2011	Diamond Convention Center, Surakarta, Indonesia	(Indonesia) Komet Akbar	(Indonesia) Wawan Widiyantoro (Indonesia) Supriyatna Gumilang		Gold	
2015	OCBC Arena, Singapore	(Indonesia) Komet Akbar	(Malaysia) Mohamad Azwar Bakar (Malaysia) Chee Chaoming	11–5, 11–3, 11–3	Gold	

Men's team

Year	Venue	Partner	Opponent	Score	Result	Ref
2015	OCBC Arena, Singapore	(Indonesia) Komet Akbar (Indonesia) Bangun Sugito (Indonesia) Suwarno	(Malaysia) Mohamad Azwar Bakar (Malaysia) Chee Chaoming (Malaysia) Ahmad Syahrir Bin Mohamad (Malaysia) Kamal Saupi		Gold	
2017	Malaysian International Trade and Exhibition Centre, Kuala Lumpur, Malaysia	(Indonesia) Komet Akbar (Indonesia) Bangun Sugito (Indonesia) Suwarno	(Thailand) Bunpot Sillapakong (Thailand) Sukij Samee		Gold	

=== SEATTA Championships ===
Men's doubles

Year	Venue	Partner	Opponent	Score	Result	Ref
2001	Singapore	(Indonesia) Yon Mardiyono	(Thailand) Phuchong Sanguansin (Thailand) Phakphoom Sanguansin	11–4, 11–4, 11–6	Gold	

=== ITTF Para Table Tennis Tour ===
Men's singles

Year	Tournament	Opponent	Score	Result
2011	Thailand Open	(Germany) Jan Brinkmann	11–7, 11–1, 11–4	(gold) Gold
2011	China Open	(China) Ge Yang		(silver) Silver
2011	Taichung TT Open	(France) Karim Boumedouha		(gold) Gold
2012	Lignano Master Open	(Czech Republic) Ivan Karabec	11–9, 11–7, 11–8	(gold) Gold
2012	Slovakia Open	(China) Lian Hao		(gold) Gold
2013	Korea Open	(China) Ge Yang		(gold) Gold
2014	Al Watani Championships	(Jordan) Saber Balah		(gold) Gold
2014	Romania Open	(Bulgaria) Denislav Stefanov Kodjabashev		(gold) Gold
2015	Slovenian Open	(Spain) Jose Manuel Ruiz Reyes		(silver) Silver
2015	Thailand Open	(Czech Republic) Ivan Karabec		(gold) Gold
2016	Indonesia Open	(Malaysia) Mohamad Azwar Bakar	11–5, 11–9, 9–11, 11–7	(gold) Gold
2017	Open Ciutat del Prat	(Spain) Jorge Cardona		(gold) Gold
2017	Spanish Open	(Poland) Igor Misztal		(gold) Gold
2017	US Open	(United Kingdom) Kim Daybell	11-9, 9–1, 14-12, 5-11, 14-12	(gold) Gold
2018	Indonesia Open	(Thailand) Bunpot Sillapakong		(gold) Gold
2018	Spanish Open	(Austria) Krisztian Gardos		(gold) Gold
2018	Copa Tango XVI	(Brazil) Carlos Alberto Carbinatti Junior	11–5, 11–8, 7–11, 11–2	(gold) Gold
2019	Egypt Open	(Indonesia) Komet Akbar		(gold) Gold
2019	Czech Open	(Poland) Igor Misztal		(gold) Gold
2019	Finland Open	(Montenegro) Filip Radovic		(gold) Gold
2019	Dutch Open	(Poland) Patryk Chojnowski		(silver) Silver
2022	Greek Open	(Indonesia) Komet Akbar		(gold) Gold

==== Men's team ====
Year	Tournament	Partner	Opponent	Score	Result	Ref
2011	Thailand Open	(Malaysia) Mohamad Azwar Bakar	(Chinese Taipei) Ju Ren-der (Chinese Taipei) Lu Wei-chen	3–1	(gold) Gold	
2011	China Open	(Malaysia) Mohamad Azwar Bakar	(China) Ge Yang (China) Lian Hao	2–3	(silver) Silver	
2011	Czech Open	(Czech Republic) Ivan Karabec	(Russia) Iurii Nozdrunov (Russia) Pavel Lukyanov	3–0	(gold) Gold	
2011	British Open	(Russia) Iurii Nozdrunov	(Spain) José Manuel Ruiz Reyes (Spain) Jorge Cardona (Spain) Álvaro Valera	2–1	(gold) Gold	
2011	Taichung TT Open	(Malaysia) Mohamad Azwar Bakar	(Chinese Taipei) Ju Ren-der (Chinese Taipei) Hsu Chih-shan	3–0	(gold) Gold	
2012	Lignano Master Open	(Indonesia) Komet Akbar	(Czech Republic) Ivan Karabec (Netherlands) Bas Hergelink	3–1	(gold) Gold	
2013	Bayreuth Open	(Indonesia) Komet Akbar	(France) Matéo Bohéas (France) Frederic Bellais	3–1	(gold) Gold	
2013	Korea Open	(Japan) Naoya Nagashita	(China) Ge Yang (China) Kong Weijie	1–3	(silver) Silver	
2014	Al Watani Championships	(Kuwait) Ali Alsanea (Russia) Vladislav Balobanov	(Netherlands) Ronald Vijverberg (Netherlands) Andrianus Johannes Van Amerongen		(silver) Silver	
2014	Romania Open	(Indonesia) Komet Akbar	(Bulgaria) Denislav Stefanov Kodjabashev (Finland) Esa Miettinen	3–1	(gold) Gold	
2015	Slovenian Open	(Indonesia) Komet Akbar	(Spain) José Manuel Ruiz Reyes (Spain) Juan Bautista Perez Gonzalez	3–1	(gold) Gold	
2015	Thailand Open	(Indonesia) Komet Akbar	(Malaysia) Mohamad Azwar Bakar (Sri Lanka) Dinesh Deshappriya Pitiyage Don Silva		(gold) Gold	
2017	US Open	(Indonesia) Komet Akbar	(United Kingdom) Kim Daybell (United Kingdom) Stacey Joshua	2–1	(gold) Gold	
2018	Copa Tango XVI	(Indonesia) Komet Akbar (Indonesia) Kusnanto	(Chile) Manuel Felipe Echaveguren Farias (Chile) Alvaro Hernan Vega Gutierrez		(gold) Gold	
2019	Finland Open	(Indonesia) Komet Akbar	(France) Matéo Bohéas (France) Gilles de la Bourdonnaye		(gold) Gold	
2019	Dutch Open	(Indonesia) Kusnanto	(Russia) Iurii Nozdrunov (Russia) Pavel Lukyanov		(gold) Gold	
