= Malaysia national cerebral palsy football team =

- Federation: NPC Malaysia
- IFCPF ranking: n/a

ASEAN Para Games
- Appearances: 1 (First in 2015)
- Best result: 4

Malaysia national cerebral palsy football team is the cerebral palsy football team that represents Malaysia in international competitions. The team competed at the 2015 ASEAN Para Games.

== Background ==
NPC Malaysia is in charge of the national team. While Malaysia was active in participating in international regional competitions by 2016, the country did not have a national championships to support national team player development.

In 2013, the rules for the sport set by the CPISRA allowed for both men and women to be on the team. By January 2015, the rules had changed and only men were eligible to be a member of the national team.

== Players ==
There have been a number of players for the Malaysian squad.

Name	Number	Classification	Position	Years active	Ref
Bin Daud Azman		FT7		2016	
Suntong Jemain		FT5		2016	
Abdul Rahman Khairil Faizi		FT6		2016	
Bin Zainal Mohd Afiq		FT7		2016	
Bin Sidi Mohd Afzainizam		FT7		2016	
Bin Tan I Mohd Izad Sufarin		FT6		2016	
Bin Zainol Mohd Nordin		FT7		2016	
Bin Abu Bakar Muhd Hafiz		FT7		2016	
Chukie Ngu		FT7		2016	
Gonnashakaran Rajendren		FT7		2016	
Sagadevan Saravanan		FT6		2016	
Bin Abu Hassan Zaidi		FT7		2016	
Amirul Mian		FT7		2016	
Hamdan Koderi		FT5		2016	
Norsham Nasir		FT7		2016	
Ahmad Firdaus Shah Ahmad Nasir		FT7		2016	
Mohamad Sobri Ghazali		FT5	Midfielder	2014, 2016	
Muhamaad Fairus Mokhatar		FT5		2016	
Ramadhan Ahmad		FT7		2016	
Muhamad Shafiq Zahari		FT7		2016	
Noor Mohd Ariff Yusoff		FT8		2016	
Shahrul Hafiz Zaini		FT7		2016	

== Rankings ==
As of August 2026, the team is ranked 22nd in the world.

== Results ==
The team has not participated in the Paralympic Games since the sport made its debut at the 1984 Games.

The team played in the 2015 ASEAN Para Games. In their 2 - 1 loss to Singapore, Mohamad Sobri scored his team's only goal. 5,323 people attended the bronze medal match in Singapore.

Competition	Location	Year	Total Teams	Result	Ref
ASEAN Para Games	Singapore	2015	5	4	
