= Table tennis at the 2017 ASEAN Para Games =

Athletics at the 2017 ASEAN Para Games
- Date: 17-23 September 2017

Para table tennis at the 2017 ASEAN Para Games were held from 17 to 23 September 2017 at Malaysian International Trade & Exhibition Centre, Kuala Lumpur.

== Medal tally ==
* Host nation (Malaysia)

Rank	Nation	Gold	Silver	Bronze	Total
1	Indonesia (INA)	14	10	4	28
2	Thailand (THA)	9	12	13	34
3	Singapore (SGP)	2	1	4	7
4	Malaysia (MAS)*	1	2	8	11
5	Philippines (PHI)	1	1	5	7
6	Vietnam (VIE)	0	1	8	9
7	Myanmar (MYA)	0	0	1	1
Totals (7 entries)		27	27	43	97

== Medalists ==
=== Men ===
Event	Class	Gold	Silver	Bronze
Singles	SM1	Aaron Yeo Kwok Chian; Singapore	Lim Min-Chieh; Singapore	none awarded
Singles	SM2	Jason Chee; Singapore	Natthawut Thinathet; Thailand	Thirayu Chueawong; Thailand
Singles	SM2	Jason Chee; Singapore	Natthawut Thinathet; Thailand	Eric Ting Chee Keong; Singapore
Singles	SM3	Yuttajak Glinbancheun; Thailand	Wittaya Wichaiwattana; Thailand	Darwin Labastida Salvacion; Philippines
Singles	SM3	Yuttajak Glinbancheun; Thailand	Wittaya Wichaiwattana; Thailand	Anurak Laowong; Thailand
Singles	SM4	Wanchai Chaiwut; Thailand	Niyom Nachai; Thailand	Adyos Astan; Indonesia
Singles	SM4	Wanchai Chaiwut; Thailand	Niyom Nachai; Thailand	Smith Billy Anonoy Cartera; Philippines
Singles	SM5	Tatok Hardiyanto; Indonesia	Wira Chiaochan; Thailand	Mohd Razak Che Awang; Malaysia
Singles	SM5	Tatok Hardiyanto; Indonesia	Wira Chiaochan; Thailand	Jedsada Yodyangdeang; Thailand
Singles	SM6–7	Rungroj Thainiyom; Thailand	Chalermpong Punpoo; Thailand	Enceng Mustopa; Indonesia
Singles	SM6–7	Rungroj Thainiyom; Thailand	Chalermpong Punpoo; Thailand	Suriyone Thapaeng; Thailand
Singles	SM8	Mohamad Rian Prahasta; Indonesia	Banyu Tri Mulyo; Indonesia	Phạm Văn Hoàng; Vietnam
Singles	SM8	Mohamad Rian Prahasta; Indonesia	Banyu Tri Mulyo; Indonesia	Võ Quốc Hưng; Vietnam
Singles	SM9	Supriyatna Gumilar; Indonesia	Ting Ing Hock; Malaysia	Chee Chaoming; Malaysia
Singles	SM9	Supriyatna Gumilar; Indonesia	Ting Ing Hock; Malaysia	Saw Hay Htoo; Myanmar
Singles	SM10	Dian David Michael Jacobs; Indonesia	Komet Akbar; Indonesia	Bunpot Sillapakong; Thailand
Singles	SM10	Dian David Michael Jacobs; Indonesia	Komet Akbar; Indonesia	Mohamad Azwar Bakar; Malaysia
Singles	SM11	Ahmad Yusuf; Indonesia	Dwi Hajiyanto; Indonesia	Jennatul Fahmi Ahmad Jennah; Malaysia
Singles	SM11	Ahmad Yusuf; Indonesia	Dwi Hajiyanto; Indonesia	Narongsak Paengjai; Thailand
Team	TM1–3	Thailand; Anurak Laowong; Natthawut Thinathet; Wittaya Wichaiwattana; Yuttajak Glinbancheun	Indonesia; Cahyo Pambudi; Sefrianto	Singapore; Aaron Yeo Kwok Chian; Darren Chua Hsiang Lim; Jason Chee; Tan Beng Leong
Team	TM4	Thailand; Niyom Nachai; Wanchai Chaiwut	Philippines; Darwin Labastida Salvacion; Smith Billy Anonoy Cartera	Vietnam; Đỗ Đại Dương; Vũ Đặng Chí
Team	TM5	Indonesia; Adyos Astan; Tatok Hardiyanto	Thailand; Jedsada Yodyangdeang; Teeradech Klangmanee; Wira Chiaochan	Singapore; Eric Ting Chee Keong; Eugene Soh Yew Lin; Lim Min-Chieh; Muhammad Dinie Asyraf Huzaini
Team	TM6–7	Thailand; Chalermpong Punpoo; Rungroj Thainiyom	Indonesia; Ajang Zaenal Abidin; Enceng Mustopa; Jason Georly	Vietnam; Đặng Thế Căn; Nguyễn Thanh Bình
Team	TM8	Indonesia; Banyu Tri Mulyo; Mohamad Rian Prahasta	Vietnam; Phạm Văn Hoàng; Võ Quốc Hưng	Thailand; Komkrit Charitsat; Panupong Santaya
Team	TM8	Indonesia; Banyu Tri Mulyo; Mohamad Rian Prahasta	Vietnam; Phạm Văn Hoàng; Võ Quốc Hưng	Malaysia; Tan Hwai Wern; Yap Moo Onn; Zulkarnain Husain
Team	TM9	Malaysia; Chee Chaoming; Hong Chin Sing; Ting Ing Hock	Indonesia; Abdul Malik Abdullah; Ivan Darmawan; Supriyatna Gumilar	Philippines; Benedicto Hernandez Gaela; Pablo Borja Catalan, Jr.
Team	TM10	Indonesia; Bangun Sugito; Dian David Michael Jacobs; Komet Akbar; Suwarno	Thailand; Bunpot Sillapakong; Sukij Samee	Malaysia; Ahmad Syahir Kamal Saupi; Mohamad Azwar Bakar
Team	TM10	Indonesia; Bangun Sugito; Dian David Michael Jacobs; Komet Akbar; Suwarno	Thailand; Bunpot Sillapakong; Sukij Samee	Vietnam; Bùi Quý Thu; Huỳnh Thanh

=== Women ===
Event	Class	Gold	Silver	Bronze
Singles	SF1–3	Dararat Asayut; Thailand	Pattaravadee Wararitdamrongkul; Thailand	Osrita Muslim; Indonesia
Singles	SF1–3	Dararat Asayut; Thailand	Pattaravadee Wararitdamrongkul; Thailand	Chilchitraryak Bootwansirina; Thailand
Singles	SF4	Wijittra Jaion; Thailand	Tarsilem; Indonesia	Toh Bee Tin; Singapore
Singles	SF4	Wijittra Jaion; Thailand	Tarsilem; Indonesia	Wassana Sringam; Thailand
Singles	SF5	Roslinda Br Manurung; Indonesia	Tan Kee Chok; Malaysia	Clancy Chung Sow Fun; Malaysia
Singles	SF5	Roslinda Br Manurung; Indonesia	Tan Kee Chok; Malaysia	Supalak Butgunha; Thailand
Singles	SF6–8	Josephine Medina; Philippines	Suwarti; Indonesia	Hamida; Indonesia
Singles	SF6–8	Josephine Medina; Philippines	Suwarti; Indonesia	Kanlaya Kriabklang; Thailand
Singles	SF9	Hana Resti; Indonesia	Chayanan Settisrikoedkun; Thailand	Wachiraporn Thepmoya; Thailand
Singles	SF9	Hana Resti; Indonesia	Chayanan Settisrikoedkun; Thailand	Nguyễn Thị Hoa Phương; Vietnam
Singles	SF10	Sella Dwi Radayana; Indonesia	Aminah; Indonesia	Minnie de Ramos Cadag; Philippines
Singles	SF10	Sella Dwi Radayana; Indonesia	Aminah; Indonesia	Việt Thị Kim Vân; Vietnam
Singles	SF11	Ana Widyasari; Indonesia	Wanna Saeyang; Thailand	Pronwimol Wangprachum; Thailand
Team	TF1–5	Thailand; Chilchitraryak Bootwansirina; Dararat Asayut; Pattaravadee Wararitdamrongkul	Indonesia; Osrita Muslim; Roslinda Br Manurung; Tarsilem	Malaysia; Azila Alias; Clancy Chung Sow Fun; Tan Kee Chok
Team	TF6–8	Indonesia; Hamida; Suwarti	Thailand; Kanlaya Kriabklang; Sumalee Suangtho	none awarded
Team	TF9–10	Indonesia; Hana Resti; Sella Dwi Radayana	Thailand; Chayanan Settisrikoedkun; Wachiraporn Thepmoya	Vietnam; Nguyễn Thị Hoa Phương; Việt Thị Kim Vân
Team	TF9–10	Indonesia; Hana Resti; Sella Dwi Radayana	Thailand; Chayanan Settisrikoedkun; Wachiraporn Thepmoya	Philippines; Josephine Medina; Minnie de Ramos Cadag

== See also ==
- Table tennis at the 2017 Southeast Asian Games
