= Lily Goh =

Singaporean artist

Lily Goh is a Deaf Singaporean artist, entrepreneur, and community leader. (Note: Goh identifies as Deaf (with a capital 'D'). Learn more about "big D Deaf" here.)

== Early life and education ==
Goh's Deafness was discovered when she was two years old. She experiences profound deafness in both ears.

She was enrolled in the Canossian School of the Hearing Impaired for her primary education (1998–1993). She was a member of the school's percussion band, eventually becoming a band leader. She was also in the swimming club. She then went on to Saint Anthony's Canossian Secondary School (1994–1997), where she continued her musical journey by participating in the concert band. After completing her GCE 'O' Level examinations, she pursued a Diploma in Information Technology at Ngee Ann Polytechnic (1998–2001). She had an active co-curricular life, taking on various roles in the Hearing Impaired Club such as president, Performing Arts Coordinator, and Vice-Treasurer. Again, she took part in the school's concert band. At Polytechnic, she earned a Special Award Certificate for Commendable Performance, and a Bronze Certificate of Achievement for her co-curricular activities.

After working for several years, Goh decided to pursue a part-time Bachelor's degree in Sociology with a minor in Communication at the Singapore University of Social Sciences (SUSS) in 2014. In 2020, she became the first Deaf degree-holder in Sociology from SUSS.

== Career ==
=== Sign Language instruction ===
From 2000 to 2007, Goh worked at the Singapore Association for the Deaf on a voluntary basis. Subsequently, from 2012 to 2014, she served on the association's linguistics subcommittee, where she was involved in the linguistic research and development of Singapore Sign Language.

She has taught Singapore Sign Language in various capacities over the years. In 2014, she conducted pro bono classes for members of the Singapore Cancer Society's New Voice Club for people who have had laryngeal cancer. She also conducts regular Basic Sign Language Communication courses.

=== Deaf art and music ===
Goh has years of experience as a performing artist. Her time spent in school bands gave her a strong foundation in percussion music. She navigates percussion by feeling the vibration of her instruments through her feet. Her instrument of choice is the marimba, and she is adept at other mallet instruments as well. She obtained a Grade 5 in Piano in 1999, a Grade 5 with Distinction in Music Theory in 2001, and a Grade 8 with Merit in Percussion in 2007.

During her time at the Singapore Association for the Deaf, Goh established the XTOMIC group, which raised awareness about deaf issues through its performances. The group also raised funds and awareness for other social causes and organisations, including old folks' homes and the Bone Marrow Donor Programme.

In 2004, Goh took part in the inaugural season of Singapore Idol. She got through two rounds of the competition. This marked her debut on the public stage. She was featured on the programme The Unsung Heroes on Singaporean television channel Channel 5 in 2004 and The Youth Decode on Channel U in 2005, as well as in publications such as Her World and Lime.

In 2007, Goh was awarded a marimba under Very Special Arts (Singapore's) Talent Development Programme, sponsored by Asia Pacific Breweries. (Note: VSA has since been renamed Arts & Disability Singapore (ART:DIS).)

She has performed at numerous high-profile events both in Singapore and abroad. In 2008, she was invited to perform at SPOTLIGHT: An Asian Festival of Inclusive Arts in Cambodia. In 2014, she was invited to represent Singapore at the ASEAN Arts Festival of Disabled Artists in Myanmar, organised by the Myanmar Ministry of Social Welfare, Relief and Resettlement and Myanmar Independent Living Initiative (MILI).

Goh co-wrote the song If You Were In My Shoes with singer Audris Ho. It emerged a semi-finalist in a British song-writing contest in 2015.

Goh has been a member of inclusive orchestra The Purple Symphony since 2015, wherein she plays the marimba. She has performed in the annual Purple Symphony yearly concert, numerous iterations of The Purple Parade, and in the 2017 Singapore National Day Parade.

The 2022 parade featured a story inspired by Goh and her experiences as a deaf artist during the COVID-19 pandemic.

=== Entrepreneurship ===
Goh founded ExtraOrdinary Horizons in 2011, as a social enterprise under the auspices of StarHub's Entrepreneurs With Disabilities programme. Its main workstream and source of revenue is conducting courses to various corporations such as DBS Bank, Google, the Singapore Cancer Society, Singapore International Foundation, the YMCA, and various Singapore government agencies.

=== Advocacy ===
Goh has been active in Deaf and disabled communities, focusing her efforts on raising awareness amongst the hearing population of Deaf culture, experiences, and sign language.

She was co-opted to the Board of the Disabled People's Association (DPA) in 2014 for a three-year term, she was re-elected in 2017 for another term. From 2014 to 2020, she was concurrently a member of the DPA's Advocacy Sub-Committee. In addition, since 2018, she has been an Inclusion Ambassador for the DPA. In this role, she supports DPA's training programmes, awareness booths, and talks.

In August 2019, she was elected to the board of the Singapore Association for the Deaf. She served a two-year term ending in August 2021.

== Accolades ==
In 2014, Goh won Mediacorp's Singapore Woman Award. The award is an annual tribute to recognise a woman who has overcome challenges to accomplish extraordinary achievements that are both meaningful and beneficial to society.
