= Sailing at the 2015 ASEAN Para Games =

Sailing at the 2015 ASEAN Para Games was held at Marina Bay, Singapore, from 6 to 8 December 2015. There were initially 4 gold medals for the 4 boat classes: single-person dinghy - Hansa 2.3 Men and Hansa 2.3 Women; Open Hansa 303 (2-person dinghy) plus the International 2.4mR (single-person keelboat). Not enough countries entered for the 2.4mR class, so this event was cancelled.

All 3 boat classes had at least a pair of competitors trading leads with only 1 point to differentiate podium places. Tension reigned all the way to the final races coupled with extremely challenging light airs made Sailing at the 2015 ASEAN Para Games an unforgettable regatta.

== History ==
Para sailing debuted as a full medal sport in the 2009 ASEAN Para Games in Malaysia. Starting as a demonstration sport in 2005's 3rd ASEAN ParaGames, the Philippines, sailing was not included in the 2008 Thailand, 2011 Indonesia and 2014 Myanmar editions of the ASEAN Para Games. Due to Singapore's passion and extensive involvement in sailing for both abled and disabled participants, Sailing was included in the sport line up announced a year ahead of the games.

== August Preparations ==
To gain expertise in the 2.4mR Paralympic-class keelboat, Singapore sent two APG sailors to the International Sailing Federation's first Paralympic Development Program clinic in Weymouth and Portland, Great Britain. The high cost and maintenance of the 2.4mR keelboat being a major factor why most developing ASEAN nations are unable to buy these boats proved also a reason there were insufficient sailors for the class to be included in the APG.

Likewise to encourage more para sailing attendance in the 2015 ASEAN Para Games, SDSC and the Singapore Sailing Federation held a pre-Games sailing training camp at Raffles Marina. The camp attended by 12 sailors from Indonesia, Malaysia, the Philippines and Vietnam, also took part in friendly racing with Sailability SDSC sailors, in the annual Western Circuit Sailing Regatta. Newbie sailors experienced fleet racing for the first time while more experienced veterans sussed out the competition, in order to train more efficiently for the sailing in the December Games.

== Challenges ==
Sailing is usually held far from land, and therefore a mysterious sport to the general public. To drum up public involvement, organisers opted for the "stadium" sailing format. Marina Bay had been one of the sailing venues for the 2015 Extreme Sailing Series and also the recent 2015 SEAGames, therefore it was the ideal venue to bring sailing closer to the viewing public.

However the 2015 ASEAN Para Games which traditionally should have begun 2 weeks after the SEAGames ended, was moved to December to cap Singapore's 50's anniversary celebrations. The December dates also coincided with Singapore's rainy season. Races were delayed or cancelled due to bad weather, with the Hansa 2.3 Women's fleet and the Hansa 303 fleets suffering the most on Day 3 with terrific delays and searing heat from morning to late afternoon. Throughout the 3 day regatta, wind speeds averaged 4 knots with surprise thrilling gusts on a sunny Day 2 briefly reaching about 15 knots before dropping to near nothing. The tall buildings and the concrete apron of Marina Bay created unusual sailing conditions that tested the sailors tremendously.

Race organisers had to move buoys in the shifty winds which further delayed scheduled races (see official communications). Timely weather reports had on-water safety boats rounding up sailors to return to the dock and hustle everyone into shore shelter, before lightning and thunderstorms hit the sailing area of Marina Bay.

== Race management ==
The sailing organization was handled by the Singapore Sailing Federation and Singapore Disability Sports Council, in partnership with the APG Organising Committee (SAPGOC). Sailing volunteers helped launch or retrieve boats, assisted wheelchair-using sailors to safely traverse the ramp to the floating dock on the Bayfront, brought packed lunches and ran many errands so sailors could concentrate on their game.

Medical assistance was keenly on standby, with safety precautions in place to constantly remind sailors, organisers and spectators to keep well hydrated. No medical incidents required aid.

PRO:

- Andrew Foo SIN

Jury:

- Chairman – Katsuya Hashiba IJ JAP
- Vice Chairman – Chu Say Ng IJ MAS
- Lock Hong Kit IJ SIN
- Tan Tee Suan IJ SIN
- Kyaw Omar NJ MYA

Technical Delegate:

- Sir Henry Sleutel NED

Measurer:

- Ho Kah Soon

Classifiers:

- Chairman – Bernard Destrube FRA
- Sue Parry GBR
- Darren Leong SIN
- Ben Tan Sin SIN

== Participating nations ==
A total of 18 athletes from 4 nations competed in para sailing at the 2015 ASEAN Para Games.

- Malaysia (4)
- Philippines (4)
- Singapore (7)
- Vietnam (3)

== Medal summary ==
=== Medal table ===
* Host nation (Singapore)

| Rank | Nation | Gold | Silver | Bronze | Total |
|---|---|---|---|---|---|
| 1 | Singapore (SIN)* | 2 | 0 | 2 | 4 |
| 2 | Malaysia (MAS) | 1 | 1 | 0 | 2 |
| 3 | Philippines (PHI) | 0 | 2 | 1 | 3 |
| Totals (3 entries) | | 3 | 3 | 3 | 9 |

=== Medalists ===
| Event | Class | Gold | Silver | Bronze |
|---|---|---|---|---|
| Single-Person Keelboat | Men's Hansa 2.3 | Al Mustakim bin Matrin; Malaysia | Alson Callos Tumbagahan; Philippines | Aaron Per Yong Quan; Singapore |
| Single-Person Keelboat | Women's Hansa 2.3 | Yap Qian Yin; Singapore | Cherrie Samonte Pinpin; Philippines | Clytie Orencio Bernardo; Philippines |
| Two-Person Keelboat | Open Hansa 303 Wide | Singapore (SIN); Tan Wei Qiang Jovin; Teo Kee Lin Anthony | Malaysia (MAS); Mustafah Bin Junell; Nurul Amilin Binti Balawi | Singapore (SIN); Lim Kok Liang Desiree; Tan Kai Rong Glen |

== Future Developments ==
Pre-regatta sailing workshops conducted by SDSC and Sailability Singapore helped jumpstart ASEAN interest in sailing in 2006. Malaysia likewise logging similar Paralympic Sailing expertise means sailing is definitely included in the succeeding ASEAN Para Games in Malaysia (2017) and the Philippines (2019). Vietnam fielded a new batch of sailors to this APG while Indonesia and Thailand have indicated interest to organize their para sailing in 2016, starting with the Bali International Sailing Regatta 2016 as a pathway leading to elite para sailing development.
