= Shooting at the 2015 ASEAN Para Games =

Paralympic shooting at the 2015 ASEAN Para Games was held at SAFRA Yishun, Singapore.

== Medal table ==
* Host nation (Singapore)

| Rank | Nation | Gold | Silver | Bronze | Total |
|---|---|---|---|---|---|
| 1 | Thailand (THA) | 7 | 4 | 2 | 13 |
| 2 | Singapore (SIN)* | 0 | 2 | 1 | 3 |
| 3 | Indonesia (INA) | 0 | 1 | 4 | 5 |
| Totals (3 entries) | | 7 | 7 | 7 | 21 |

== Medalists ==
=== Men ===
| Event | Gold | Silver | Bronze |
|---|---|---|---|
| R1 10 m air rifle standing SH1 | Phiraphong Buengbok; Thailand | Ritchie Chan Jun Rong; Singapore | Mala Sihabandit; Thailand |
| P1 10 m air pistol SH1 | Bordin Sornsriwichai; Thailand | Logaraj So Raju; Singapore | Zulkifli; Indonesia |

=== Women ===
| Event | Gold | Silver | Bronze |
|---|---|---|---|
| R2 10 m air rifle standing SH1 | Chutima Saenlar; Thailand | Wasana Keatjaratkul; Thailand | Hanik Puji Hastuti; Indonesia |
| P2 10 m air pistol SH1 | Somporn Muangsiri; Thailand | Maneerat Nonsang; Thailand | Alvina Neo; Singapore |

=== Mixed ===
| Event | Gold | Silver | Bronze |
|---|---|---|---|
| R3 10 m air rifle prone SH1 | Atidet Intanon; Thailand | Woraprat Sirisak; Thailand | Aris Haryadi; Indonesia |
| R4 10 m air rifle standing SH2 | Anuson Chaichamnan; Thailand | Bolo Triyatno; Indonesia | Tanong Channam; Thailand |
| R5 10 m air rifle prone SH2 | Chatchai Senachan; Thailand | Tanong Channam; Thailand | Bolo Triyanto; Indonesia |
