= CP5 =

CP5 may refer to:

- CP5 (classification), a disability sport classification specific to cerebral palsy
- CP5, a Network Rail Control Period (2014–2019) of railway infrastructure in Great Britain
- CP5, an EEG electrode site in the 10-20 system
- The Central Park Five, a group of teens falsely accused of raping and sexually assaulting Trisha Meili
