= Chilchitparyak Bootwansirina =

Thai Paralympic table tennis player

Personal information
- Native name: ชิลชิตพยัค บุตรวรรณสิริณา
- Born: 2 December 1975 (age 50) Nakhon Sawan, Thailand

Sport
- Country: Thailand
- Sport: Para table tennis
Medal record
Paralympic Games
Bronze medal – third place	2024 Paris	Women's doubles
Asian Para Games
Silver medal – second place	2018 Jakarta	Mixed doubles
Silver medal – second place	2022 Hangzhou	Mixed doubles
Bronze medal – third place	2014 Incheon	Women's team
Bronze medal – third place	2022 Hangzhou	Women's singles
Asian Para Table Tennis Championships
Silver medal – second place	2019 Taichung	Women's singles
ASEAN Para Games
Gold medal – first place	2017 Kuala Lumpur	Team C1-5

Chilchitparyak Bootwansirina (Thai: ชิลชิตพยัค บุตรวรรณสิริณา; born 2 December 1975 in Nakhon Sawan) is a Thai Paralympic table tennis player.

== Career ==
Bootwansirina began playing table tennis in 2007.

At the 2019 Asian Para Table Tennis Championships in Taichung, Taiwan, Bootwansirina took silver in the Women's singles class 1–2.

At the 2022 World Para Table Tennis Championships in Andalusia, Bootwansirina made it to the finals in the Women's Doubles class 5, where she competed alongside partner Dararat Asayut. She also reached the semi-finals of Mixed Doubles class 4 with partner Thirayu Chueawong. At the 2022 ITTF Slovenia Para Open, she also reached the semi-finals of Women's Doubles class 5 with partner Pattaravadee Wararitdamrongkul, and the finals of Mixed Doubles class 4 with partner Thirayu Chueawong.

At the 2022 Asian Para Games, Bootwansirina won bronze in the women's singles class 1–2.

At the 2024 Summer Paralympics, she won bronze in women's WD5 doubles alongside Dararat Asayut.

== Personal life ==
Bootwansirina attended Dhammakaya Open University in Thailand. She speaks both Thai and English.
