= Jason Chee =

Singaporean Navy serviceman and para table tennis player

Personal information
- Born: 26 January 1983 (age 43)

Sport
- Sport: Table tennis

Jason Chee Weng Fai (Chinese: 朱永辉; Jyutping: zyu1 wing5 fai1; born 26 January 1983) is a Singaporean navy regular serviceman and para table tennis player who has won gold medals at multiple editions of the ASEAN Para Games.

== Early life and education ==
Chee was born in 1983 in Singapore to parents, Chee Kwok Chor and Chua Ah Lek His father, Chee, of Shanghainese descent, worked as a vegetable seller until his retirement in 2011. His mother, Chua, was a seamstress who died in 2011 due to kidney failure at the age of 65.

Chee studied at Westlake Primary School, Guangyang Secondary School and then Ngee Ann Polytechnic. According to Chee, he played table tennis from a young age and represented Westlake Primary School in the sport.

== Military career ==
While at Guangyang Secondary School, Chee joined the Boys' Brigade due to his admiration of their uniforms and marching. Chee later enlisted in the Republic of Singapore Navy as a regular serviceman.

While holding the rank of Military Expert-2 and serving as a weapon systems supervisor, Chee had a serious accident on 10 December 2012 on board the RSS Endeavour at Changi Naval Base. Chee was caught between a motorised winch and a berthing rope he was checking on, causing Chee to lose both his legs, his left arm (with his dominant left hand), one whole right finger and parts of two other right fingers.

Chee's accident resulted in Singaporeans coming forward to donate O+ blood, prompting the National Blood Programme to assure that there were already enough blood supplies for Chee and "clarify that directed and replacement donations (where families and friends are obliged to donate blood for the patient or to replace blood used by the patient) are not practised in Singapore". Chee was hospitalized until June 2013. He had had phantom limb pain for three or four months, but had dealt with it by not thinking of his missing limbs.

In June 2014, Chee returned to work in the Singapore Navy, it being 18 months after his accident; he was assigned to be an operations supervisor in 191 Squadron. Concurrently, Chee was also studying for a degree in mathematics at the Singapore University of Social Sciences; such education was a wish of his late mother.

In 2017, Chee was a desk-bound training specialist at Changi Naval Base.

== Table tennis career ==
Chee started playing table tennis at the age of 5, eventually representing his primary school in the sport.

In June 2013, Chee began playing para table tennis while equipped with prosthetic fingers; his efforts were supported by the Singapore Disability Sports Council. He formerly played table tennis with his left hand, but since his left arm had been amputated, he had to learn to play para table tennis with his right hand.

In September 2013, Chee won two gold medals in para table tennis at Singapore's 8th National Disability League for para table tennis.

At the January 2014 ASEAN Para Games, Chee debuted for the Singapore national team by teaming with Darren Chua to win the bronze medal for the men's team Class 3 para table tennis event. At the same Games, Chee also won a silver in the men's individual Class 2 para table tennis event. Chee has been coached by Chia Chong Boon.

At the ITTF 3rd Taichung Table Tennis Open for the Disabled in August 2015, Chee won a bronze for the men's singles Class 2 event.

In December 2015 at the 2015 ASEAN Para Games, Chee helped Singapore win their first gold medal for para table tennis at the ASEAN Para Games by winning both his singles matches and his doubles match with team-mate Aaron Yeo. As a result, Singapore overcame Thailand 3–1 in the men's team Class 1–2 contest for the gold.

In April 2017, Chee began to lose vision in his right eye due to a tumour. In May 2017, he was diagnosed with choroidal melanoma, a form of eye cancer. It was found that the cancer had not spread beyond his right eye, and that month Chee underwent successful surgery to remove his right eye; he was fully discharged from hospitalization in June 2017. The loss of his right eye affected Chee's depth perception, affecting his playing of para table tennis.

In September 2017, Chee won a gold medal in the men's individual Class 2 para table tennis event during the 2017 ASEAN Para Games. At the same Games, Chee also won a bronze in the men's team Class 1–3 para table tennis event (compared to Class 1–2 in the previous Games, Class 1–3 can feature less impaired para-athletes). For his achievements, Chee was chosen as The Straits Times' Athlete of the Year for 2017.

Chee also told of his target to graduate with a degree in mathematics in 2019/20. To this end, Chee decided to take a break from the competitive sports to concentrate on his studies at the Singapore University of Social Sciences. Hence, Chee gave up the opportunity defending his title in the 2020 ASEAN Para Games.

== Personal life ==
In an interview published in October 2017, Chee said that he uses prosthetic legs to walk short distances while at work, but with the prosthetics it would take him 10 minutes to walk 25 metres. In contrast, his wheelchair can travel up to 12 kilometres per hour.

Chee told of learning perseverance from his father, who for over 40 years refused to take a holiday from his work: collecting vegetables at 11.30pm from Pasir Panjang Wholesale Centre, and selling them the next day at Jalan Besar until 1pm. Chee also quoted that his mother wanted him to learn more skills so that he would not "lose to anyone". Chee has also told of his late mother's wisdom having made him stronger in dealing with his challenges.

Chee was engaged to his girlfriend of three years, Nonie Marasigan Dumas on 1 March 2020.
