= Wheelchair basketball at the 2015 ASEAN Para Games =

Wheelchair basketball at the 2015 ASEAN Para Games was held at Singapore Indoor Stadium, Singapore.

== Medal table ==
Rank	Nation	Gold	Silver	Bronze	Total
1	Thailand (THA)	2	0	0	2
2	Malaysia (MAS)	0	2	0	2
3	Philippines (PHI)	0	0	2	2
Totals (3 entries)		2	2	2	6

== Medalists ==
Event	Gold	Silver	Bronze
Men's team 3-3	Thailand (THA); Jakkapan Jansupin; Aekkasit Jumjarean; Niwat Kongta; Kwanchai Pimkorn; Visut Sukon	Malaysia (MAS); Muhammad Khairul Azman bin M. Khairi; Muhammad Azzwar bin Hassan Asaari; Razali bin Cantik; Chua Tze Kah; Ahmad Nazri bin Hamzah	Philippines (PHI); Juanito Cerezo Mingarine; Marcos Jr Maurecio Rabasto; Mark Anthony Ceneta Ramirez; Freddie Penabella Magdayo; Rene Gajano Macabenguil
Men's team	Thailand (THA); Muhammadnurden Arbah; Roongrote Chaiman; Tawatchai Jaisin; Jakkapan Jansupin; Aekkasit Jumjarean; Niwat Kongta; Surasit Nirat; Kwanchai Pimkorn; Athin Singdong; Pongsakorn Sripirom; Visut Sukon; Noppadol Wannaborworn	Malaysia (MAS); Muhammad Khairul Azman bin M. Khairi; Muhammad Roozaimi bin Johari; Muhammad Azzwar bin Hassan Asaari; Razali bin Cantik; Freday Tan Yei Bing; Mohd Razzuwad bin Mat Seman; Chua Tze Kah; Muhamad Atib bin Zakaria; Mohamad Azwan bin Mohd Yusoff; Hafizuddin bin Bahrin; Zulfikri bin Zakaria; Ahmad Nazri bin Hamzah	Philippines (PHI); Marlon Mercader Nacita; Cleford Patagnan Trocino; Danilo Julio Castro; Jefferson Legaspi Legacion; Alex Nicolas Teves; Juanito Cerezo Mingarine; Marcos Jr Maurecio Rabasto; Mark Anthony Ceneta Ramirez; John Rey Aguirre Escalante; Freddie Penabella Magdayo; Rene Gajano Macabenguil; Alfie Cabanog
