= Archery at the 2015 ASEAN Para Games =

Next → 2017

Archery at the 2015 ASEAN Para Games was held at Kallang Cricket Field, Singapore.

== Medal table ==
* Host nation (Singapore)

Rank	Nation	Gold	Silver	Bronze	Total
1	Thailand (THA)	3	1	3	7
2	Singapore (SIN)*	2	0	0	2
3	Malaysia (MAS)	1	2	1	4
4	Indonesia (INA)	0	2	0	2
5	Myanmar (MYA)	0	1	0	1
Totals (5 entries)		6	6	4	16

== Medalists ==
=== Men ===
Event	Gold	Silver	Bronze
Individual compound open	Yuhaizam bin Yahaya; Malaysia	Muklis; Indonesia	Azrul bin Abd Rashid; Malaysia
Individual recurve open	Hanreuchai Netsiri; Thailand	Boonyarit Chaipoon; Thailand	Sakon Inkaew; Thailand

=== Women ===
Event	Gold	Silver	Bronze
Individual compound open	Nur Syahidah binte Alim; Singapore	Nor Sa'adah binti Abdul Wahab; Malaysia	Ratchanee Panmai; Thailand
Individual recurve open	Wasana Khuthawisap; Thailand	Veronica Ninik Umardyani; Indonesia	Phannibha Srathongmaew; Thailand

=== Mixed ===
Event	Gold	Silver	Bronze
Team compound open	Singapore (SIN); Robert Fuchs; Nur Syahidah binte Alim	Malaysia (MAS); Mohd Zafi Rahman bin Mat Saleh; Yuhaizam bin Yahaya; Azrul bin Abd Rashid; Nor Sa'adah binti Abdul Wahab	-
Team recurve	Thailand (THA); Hanreuchai Netsiri; Sakon Inkaew; Boonyarit Chaipoon; Thean Thongloy; Wasana Khuthawisap; Priyaphon Kaeochaemchan; Phannibha Srathongmaew; Ratchanee Panmai	Myanmar (MYA); Maung Phyo; Zar Nyi Lin; Zar Nyi Tun; Thu Zar Htay	-

== See also ==
- Archery at the 2015 Southeast Asian Games
