= Bowling at the 2015 ASEAN Para Games =

Next → 2017

Bowling at the 2015 ASEAN Para Games was held at Temasek Club, Singapore.

== Medal table ==
* Host nation (Singapore)

| Rank | Nation | Gold | Silver | Bronze | Total |
|---|---|---|---|---|---|
| 1 | Malaysia (MAS) | 8 | 7 | 4 | 19 |
| 2 | Singapore (SIN)* | 3 | 2 | 3 | 8 |
| 3 | Thailand (THA) | 2 | 1 | 0 | 3 |
| 4 | Brunei (BRU) | 1 | 0 | 2 | 3 |
| 5 | Philippines (PHI) | 0 | 3 | 3 | 6 |
| 6 | Indonesia (INA) | 0 | 1 | 1 | 2 |
| 7 | Myanmar (MYA) | 0 | 0 | 1 | 1 |
| Totals (7 entries) | | 14 | 14 | 14 | 42 |

== Medalists ==
=== Singles ===
| Event | Gold | Silver | Bronze |
|---|---|---|---|
| TPB 1 | Azuan bin Amir Hassan; Malaysia | Krisada Kietkongtawee; Thailand | Muhamad Hairul bin Miran; Malaysia |
| TPB 2 | Choo Kam Chan; Malaysia | Muhamad Suhaili bin Ab Hamid; Malaysia | Saidin bin Haji Awang Damit; Brunei |
| TPB 3 | Mohamed Ismail bin Hussain; Singapore | Zainul Akmal bin Siran; Malaysia | Ku Izham bin Ku Harun; Malaysia |
| TPB 4 | Mohamad Rausyan bin Mohamad Yaacob; Singapore | Foo Ming De Eric; Singapore | Ye Phone Maung; Myanmar |
| TPB 8 | Anuar bin Saaid; Singapore | Francisco Ramirez Ednaco; Philippines | Jaime Baguitan Manginga; Philippines |
| TPB 9 | Wong Kee Soon; Malaysia | Abu Bakar bin Nyat; Malaysia | Lim Choon Heng; Singapore |
| TPB 10 | Samsudin bin Hassan; Malaysia | Kim Ian Tan Chi; Philippines | Firmansyah; Indonesia |

=== Doubles ===
| Event | Gold | Silver | Bronze |
|---|---|---|---|
| TPB 1 + TPB 3 | Malaysia (MAS); Azuan bin Amir Hassan; Zainul Akmal bin Siran | Malaysia (MAS); Muhamad Hairul bin Miran; Ku Izham bin Ku Harun | Singapore (SIN); Yong Phen Chong Thomas; Mohamed Ismail bin Hussain |
| TPB 2 + TPB 2 | Brunei (BRU); Kamarul Ariffin bin Haji Abd Ghaffar; Saidin bin Haji Awang Damit | Malaysia (MAS); Muhamad Suhaili bin Ab Hamid; Choo Kam Chan | Malaysia (MAS); Ramli bin Ismail; Mohd Azmir bin Ariffin |
| TPB 8 + TPB 8 | Malaysia (MAS); Mohd Khairul bin Ishak; Zahidi bin Lamsah | Philippines (PHI); Jaime Baguitan Manginga; Francisco Ramirez Ednaco | Singapore (SIN); Anuar bin Saaid; Tay Leong Hock |
| TPB 9 + TPB 9 | Malaysia (MAS); Abu Bakar bin Nyat; Wong Kee Soon | Indonesia (INA); Sudartatik; Haryo Tetuko Setowijoyo | Malaysia (MAS); Mohd Azrin bin Rahim; Nadia Shafika binti Abdul Rahman |
| TPB 10 + TPB 10 | Thailand (THA); Raiwin Phisitthanakul; Chaiwat Achatongkum | Malaysia (MAS); Samsudin bin Hassan; Abdul Rahman bin Pp Bava Kutty | Philippines (PHI); Kim Ian Tan Chi; Samuel Llanos Matias |

=== Trios ===
| Event | Gold | Silver | Bronze |
|---|---|---|---|
| TPB 1 + TPB 1/2 + TPB 2/3 | Malaysia (MAS); Muhamad Hairul bin Miran; Choo Kam Chan; Zainul Akmal bin Siran | Singapore (SIN); Thomas Nathan Chan Kim Yong; Goh Jong Theng Kelvin; Mohamed Ismail bin Hussain | Brunei (BRU); Muhammad Jamary bin Danggat; Kamarul Ariffin bin Haji Abd Ghaffar; Saidin bin Haji Awang Damit |
| TPB 8 + TPB 8/9 + TPB 9/10 | Thailand (THA); Suwitchai Merngprom; Sawai Padpong; Raiwin Phisitthanakul | Malaysia (MAS); Mohd Khairul bin Ishak; Abu Bakar bin Nyat; Samsudin bin Hassan | Philippines (PHI); Kim Ian Tan Chi; Angelito Tubiera Guloya; Francisco Ramirez Ednaco |
