= Chess at the 2015 ASEAN Para Games =

Chess at the 2015 ASEAN Para Games was held at OCBC Arena, Singapore.

== Medal table ==
Rank	Nation	Gold	Silver	Bronze	Total
1	Indonesia (INA)	9	10	6	25
2	Philippines (PHI)	6	6	2	14
3	Vietnam (VIE)	5	4	3	12
4	Myanmar (MYA)	4	2	3	9
5	Malaysia (MAS)	0	2	2	4
Totals (5 entries)		24	24	16	64

== Medalists ==
=== Men ===
Event	Gold	Silver	Bronze
Individual standard B1	Aye Lwin; Myanmar	Edy Suryanto; Indonesia	Kaung San; Myanmar
Team standard B1	Myanmar (MYA); Aye Lwin; Kaung San; Myo Myint Aung	Indonesia (INA); Edy Suryanto; Carsidi; Ismayuddin Simangunsong	-
Individual rapid B1	Aye Lwin; Myanmar	Francis Bautista Ching; Philippines	Ismayuddin Simangunsong; Indonesia
Team rapid B1	Myanmar (MYA); Aye Lwin; Kaung San; Myo Myint Aung	Philippines (PHI); Francis Bautista Ching; Rodolfo Dv Sarmiento; Cecilio E Bilog	-
Individual standard B2/B3	Menandro Junnie Redor; Philippines	Arman S. Subaste; Philippines	Yadi Sopian; Indonesia
Team standard B2/B3	Philippines (PHI); Arman S. Subaste; Israel Dela Rosa Peligro; Menandro Junnie Redor	Indonesia (INA); Yadi Sopian; Sujarwo; Indra Yoga	Myanmar (MYA); Aung Si Thu; Hla Moe; Maw Shae
Individual rapid B2/B3	Menandro Junnie Redor; Philippines	Arman S. Subaste; Philippines	Sujarwo; Indonesia
Team rapid B2/B3	Philippines (PHI); Arman S. Subaste; Israel Dela Rosa Peligro; Menandro Junnie Redor	Indonesia (INA); Yadi Sopian; Sujarwo; Indra Yoga	Malaysia (MAS); Saharuddin bin Mappa; Shaharuddin bin Sidek; Hanson Ang Ping Ting
Individual standard PI	Azhar Panjaitan; Indonesia	Henry Roger I Lopez; Philippines	Sander De Erit Severino; Philippines
Team standard PI	Indonesia (INA); Azhar Panjaitan; Sudirman; Moechamad Noer Abidin	Philippines (PHI); Henry Roger I Lopez; James Gamao Infu Esto; Sander De Erit Severino	Vietnam (VIE); Nguyen Van Quan; Tran Tri Trinh
Individual rapid PI	Sander De Erit Severino; Philippines	Azhar Panjaitan; Indonesia	Henry Roger I Lopez; Philippines
Team rapid PI	Philippines (PHI); Henry Roger I Lopez; James Gamao Infu Esto; Sander De Erit Severino	Indonesia (INA); Azhar Panjaitan; Sudirman; Moechamad Noer Abidin	Vietnam (VIE); Nguyen Van Quan; Tran Tri Trinh

=== Women ===
Event	Gold	Silver	Bronze
Individual standard B1	Tati Karhati; Indonesia	Wilma Margaretha Sinaga; Indonesia	Debi Ariesta; Indonesia
Team standard B1	Indonesia (INA); Tati Karhati; Debi Ariesta; Wilma Margaretha Sinaga	Vietnam (VIE); Nguyen Thi Thao; Dao Thi Le Xuan	-
Individual rapid B1	Wilma Margaretha Sinaga; Indonesia	Debi Ariesta; Indonesia	Tati Karhati; Indonesia
Team rapid B1	Indonesia (INA); Tati Karhati; Debi Ariesta; Wilma Margaretha Sinaga	Myanmar (MYA); Ohnmar Htwe; Ze Masar; Yan Pu	-
Individual standard B2/B3	Nguyen Thi Hong Chau; Vietnam	Nguyen Thi Minh Thu; Vietnam	Nur Feiqha Maulad Mohamed Halil; Malaysia
Team standard B2/B3	Vietnam (VIE); Nguyen Thi Minh Thu; Nguyen Thi Hong Chau	Malaysia (MAS); Nur Feiqha Maulad Mohamed Halil; Seri Izdihar binti Mohd Shoberi	-
Individual rapid B2/B3	Nguyen Thi Minh Thu; Vietnam	Nur Feiqha Maulad Mohamed Halil; Malaysia	Aye Khin; Myanmar
Team rapid B2/B3	Vietnam (VIE); Nguyen Thi Minh Thu; Nguyen Thi Hong Chau	Myanmar (MYA); Phyu Phyu Win; Aye Khin; Phyo Wai Khin	-
Individual standard PI	Nasip Farta Simanja; Indonesia	Roslinda Br Manurung; Indonesia	Tran Thi Bich Thuy; Vietnam
Team standard PI	Indonesia (INA); Yuni; Roslinda Br Manurung; Nasip Farta Simanja	Vietnam (VIE); Tran Thi Bich Thuy; Doan Thu Huyen	-
Individual rapid PI	Doan Thu Huyen; Vietnam	Roslinda Br Manurung; Indonesia	Yuni; Indonesia
Team rapid PI	Indonesia (INA); Yuni; Roslinda Br Manurung; Nasip Farta Simanja	Vietnam (VIE); Tran Thi Bich Thuy; Doan Thu Huyen	-
