= Powerlifting at the 2015 ASEAN Para Games =

Paralympic powerlifting at the 2015 ASEAN Para Games was held at Marina Bay Sands, Singapore.

== Medal table ==
* Host nation (Singapore)

Rank	Nation	Gold	Silver	Bronze	Total
1	Vietnam (VIE)	6	3	1	10
2	Indonesia (INA)	5	2	2	9
3	Thailand (THA)	4	7	3	14
4	Malaysia (MAS)	3	2	5	10
5	Philippines (PHI)	1	0	1	2
6	Laos (LAO)	0	1	2	3
7	Singapore (SIN)*	0	0	1	1
Totals (7 entries)		19	15	15	49

== Medalists ==
=== Men ===
Event	Gold		Silver		Bronze	
49 kg	Le Van Cong; Vietnam	178	Pia; Laos	125	Khlaeo Motnok; Thailand	110
54 kg	Nguyen Binh An; Vietnam	175	Choochat Sukjarern; Thailand	150	Amorntep Pongsao; Thailand	123
59 kg	Narong Kasanun; Thailand	166	Ahmad Hidayat; Indonesia	156	Nguyen Van Phuc; Vietnam	155
65 kg	Nguyen Thanh Xuan; Vietnam	171	Phongsakon Chumchai; Thailand	161	Vision Jasni; Malaysia	145
72 kg	Thongsa Marasri; Thailand	185	Ma Phuong Quang; Vietnam	163	Sisavengsouk Phoutthavong; Laos	145
80 kg	Kampa Pongtao; Thailand	175	Ma Hussein Matnoh; Malaysia	156	Angriwan; Indonesia	156
88 kg	Anto Boi; Indonesia	188	Prasit Thongdee; Thailand	176	Nurul Azhar Norrin; Malaysia	175
97 kg	Jong Yee Khie; Malaysia	200	Prakit Tongsang; Thailand	160	R. Nadesan Kalai Vanen; Singapore	140
107 kg	Mohd Shahmil Mohd Saad; Malaysia	190	Atmaji Priambodo; Indonesia	170	Opas Jaithon; Thailand	145

=== Women ===
Event	Gold		Silver		Bronze	
41 kg	Ni Nengah Widiasih; Indonesia	95	Nguyen Thi Hong; Vietnam	85	Marydol Pamatian; Philippines	61
45 kg	Le Thi Anh Nga; Vietnam	64	Phikul Charoenying; Thailand	55	Phaivanh Philavanh; Laos	35
50 kg	Dang Thi Linh Phuong; Vietnam	93	Wandi Kongmuang; Thailand	91	Rani Puji Astuti; Indonesia	86
55 kg	Chau Hoang Tuyet Loan; Vietnam	100	-	-	-	-
61 kg	Hat Motnok; Thailand	74	Nguyen Thi Thanh Thuy; Vietnam	68	Bibiana Ahmad; Malaysia	60
67 kg	Sona Agon; Malaysia	62	-	-	-	-
73 kg	Nurtani Purba; Indonesia	80	-	-	-	-
79 kg	Siti Mahmudah; Indonesia	115	-	-	-	-
86 kg	Ni Nengah Widiasih; Indonesia	80	Sarifah Raudzhah Syed Akil; Malaysia	75	Noormyra Rosli; Malaysia	45
Over 86 kg	Adeline Ancheta; Philippines	100	Netsuda Panna; Thailand	80	Norfariza Mortadza; Malaysia	75
