= Table tennis at the 2015 ASEAN Para Games =

Para table tennis at the 2015 ASEAN Para Games was held at OCBC Arena Singapore.

== Medal table ==
* Host nation (Singapore)

Rank	Nation	Gold	Silver	Bronze	Total
1	Thailand (THA)	17	5	16	38
2	Indonesia (INA)	15	13	10	38
3	Malaysia (MAS)	2	4	7	13
4	Vietnam (VIE)	1	8	4	13
5	Singapore (SIN)*	1	3	3	7
6	Philippines (PHI)	1	1	7	9
7	Myanmar (MYA)	0	0	2	2
Totals (7 entries)		37	34	49	120

== Medalists ==
=== Men ===
Event	Gold	Silver	Bronze
Singles – Class 1	Nipon Theptoranee; Thailand	Yeo Kwok Chian Aaron; Singapore	Lim Min Chieh Stanley; Singapore
Singles – Class 2	Natthawut Thinathet; Thailand	Chee Weng Fai Jason; Singapore	Ting Chee Keong Eric; Singapore
Singles – Class 3	Anurak Laowong; Thailand	Wittaya Wichaiwattana; Thailand	Darwin Labastida Salvacion; Philippines
Singles – Class 3	Anurak Laowong; Thailand	Wittaya Wichaiwattana; Thailand	Yuttajak Glinbancheun; Thailand
Singles – Class 4	Wanchai Chaiwut; Thailand	Vu Dang Chi; Vietnam	Smith Billy Anonoy Cartera; Philippines
Singles – Class 4	Wanchai Chaiwut; Thailand	Vu Dang Chi; Vietnam	Adyos Astan; Indonesia
Singles – Class 5	Agus Sutanto; Indonesia	Tatok Hardiyanto; Indonesia	Maitree Kongruang; Thailand
Singles – Class 5	Agus Sutanto; Indonesia	Tatok Hardiyanto; Indonesia	Jedsada Yodyangdeang; Thailand
Singles – Class 6-7	Rungroj Thainiyom; Thailand	Chalermpong Punpoo; Thailand	Vo Quoc Hung; Vietnam
Singles – Class 6-7	Rungroj Thainiyom; Thailand	Chalermpong Punpoo; Thailand	Ajang Zaenal Abidin; Indonesia
Singles – Class 8	Mohamad Rian Prahasta; Indonesia	Pham Van Hoang; Vietnam	Parinya Chuaigate Keereerut; Thailand
Singles – Class 8	Mohamad Rian Prahasta; Indonesia	Pham Van Hoang; Vietnam	Abdul Malik Abdullah; Indonesia
Singles – Class 9	Koh Zhi Liang; Malaysia	Ting Ing Hock; Malaysia	Ivan Darmawan; Indonesia
Singles – Class 9	Koh Zhi Liang; Malaysia	Ting Ing Hock; Malaysia	Supriyatna Gumilar; Indonesia
Singles – Class 10	Dian David Michael Jacobs; Indonesia	Bui Quy Thu; Vietnam	Bunpot Sillapakong; Thailand
Singles – Class 10	Dian David Michael Jacobs; Indonesia	Bui Quy Thu; Vietnam	Mohamad Azwar bin Bakar; Malaysia
Singles – Class 11	M. Fahmi Salam; Indonesia	-	-
Doubles – Class 1-3	Thailand (THA); Wittaya Wichaiwattana; Anurak Laowong	Indonesia (INA); Cahyo Pambudi; Sefrianto	Thailand (THA); Wittaya Wichaiwattana; Anurak Laowong
Doubles – Class 1-3	Thailand (THA); Wittaya Wichaiwattana; Anurak Laowong	Indonesia (INA); Cahyo Pambudi; Sefrianto	Vietnam (VIE); Mang Phung Tu; Nguyen Minh Loi
Doubles – Class 4-5	Indonesia (INA); Tatok Hardiyanto; Agus Sutanto	Thailand (THA); Wanchai Chaiwut; Maitree Kongruang	Thailand (THA); Yuttajak Glinbancheun; Jedsada Yodyangdeang
Doubles – Class 4-5	Indonesia (INA); Tatok Hardiyanto; Agus Sutanto	Thailand (THA); Wanchai Chaiwut; Maitree Kongruang	Philippines (PHI); Darwin Labastida Salvacion; Smith Billy Anonoy Cartera
Doubles – Class 6-7	Thailand (THA); Chalermpong Punpoo; Rungroj Thainiyom	Indonesia (INA); Enceng Mustopa; Ajang Zaenal Abidin	Thailand (THA); Thanapong Dulayaanukij; Yuttana Namsaga
Doubles – Class 6-7	Thailand (THA); Chalermpong Punpoo; Rungroj Thainiyom	Indonesia (INA); Enceng Mustopa; Ajang Zaenal Abidin	Indonesia (INA); Joni Herlian Bonoso; Jumali Mudani
Doubles – Class 8	Indonesia (INA); Leonardo Aritonang; Mohamad Rian Prahasta	Vietnam (VIE); Vo Quoc Hung; Pham Van Hoang	Thailand (THA); Komkrit Charitsat; Parinya Chuaigate Keereerut
Doubles – Class 8	Indonesia (INA); Leonardo Aritonang; Mohamad Rian Prahasta	Vietnam (VIE); Vo Quoc Hung; Pham Van Hoang	Indonesia (INA); Banyu Tri Mulyo; Choirur Rosyid
Doubles – Class 9	Indonesia (INA); Abdul Malik Abdullah; Supriyatna Gumilar	Indonesia (INA); Ivan Darmawan; Budi Santoso	Myanmar (MYA); Tin Maung Nyunt; Saw Hay Htoo
Doubles – Class 9	Indonesia (INA); Abdul Malik Abdullah; Supriyatna Gumilar	Indonesia (INA); Ivan Darmawan; Budi Santoso	Malaysia (MAS); Ting Ing Hock; Koh Zhi Liang
Doubles – Class 10	Indonesia (INA); Komet Akbar; Dian David Michael Jacobs	Malaysia (MAS); Mohamad Azwar bin Bakar; Chee Chaoming	Thailand (THA); Sukij Samee; Bunpot Sillapakong
Doubles – Class 10	Indonesia (INA); Komet Akbar; Dian David Michael Jacobs	Malaysia (MAS); Mohamad Azwar bin Bakar; Chee Chaoming	Singapore (SIN); Mu Yu Guang; Gan Zhi Hao Harrison
Team – Class 1-2	Singapore (SIN); Yeo Kwok Chian Aaron; Chee Weng Fai Jason; Ting Chee Keong Eric; Chua Hsiang Lim Darren	-	-
Team – Class 3	Thailand (THA); Wittaya Wichaiwattana; Yuttajak Glinbancheun; Anurak Laowong	Vietnam (VIE); Mang Phung Tu; Nguyen Minh Loi	Indonesia (INA); Cahyo Pambudi; Sefrianto; Guruh Supriyo Handono
Team – Class 4-5	Indonesia (INA); Adyos Astan; Tatok Hardiyanto; Agus Sutanto	Thailand (THA); Wanchai Chaiwut; Maitree Kongruang; Jedsada Yodyangdeang	Vietnam (VIE); Vu Dang Chi; Giang Ngoc Thanh
Team – Class 4-5	Indonesia (INA); Adyos Astan; Tatok Hardiyanto; Agus Sutanto	Thailand (THA); Wanchai Chaiwut; Maitree Kongruang; Jedsada Yodyangdeang	Philippines (PHI); Darwin Labastida Salvacion; Smith Billy Anonoy Cartera
Team – Class 6-7	Thailand (THA); Chalermpong Punpoo; Rungroj Thainiyom; Thanapong Dulayaanukij; Yuttana Namsaga	Indonesia (INA); Joni Herlian Bonoso; Enceng Mustopa; Ajang Zaenal Abidin; Jumali Mudani	-
Team – Class 8	Indonesia (INA); Abdul Malik Abdullah; Leonardo Aritonang; Banyu Tri Mulyo; Mohamad Rian Prahasta	Vietnam (VIE); Vo Quoc Hung; Pham Minh Tuan; Pham Van Hoang	Malaysia (MAS); Tan Hwai Wern; Yap Moo Onn
Team – Class 8	Indonesia (INA); Abdul Malik Abdullah; Leonardo Aritonang; Banyu Tri Mulyo; Mohamad Rian Prahasta	Vietnam (VIE); Vo Quoc Hung; Pham Minh Tuan; Pham Van Hoang	Thailand (THA); Komkrit Charitsat; Parinya Chuaigate Keereerut
Team – Class 9	Malaysia (MAS); Ting Ing Hock; Koh Zhi Liang	Indonesia (INA); Ivan Darmawan; Budi Santoso; Supriyatna Gumilar; Choirur Rosyid	Myanmar (MYA); Tin Maung Nyunt; Saw Hay Htoo; Kyaw Zaw Soe
Team – Class 9	Malaysia (MAS); Ting Ing Hock; Koh Zhi Liang	Indonesia (INA); Ivan Darmawan; Budi Santoso; Supriyatna Gumilar; Choirur Rosyid	Philippines (PHI); Pablo Jr Borja Catalan; Benedicto Hernandez Gaela
Team – Class 10	Indonesia (INA); Komet Akbar; Dian David Michael Jacobs; Bangun Sugito; Suwarno	Malaysia (MAS); Mohamad Azwar bin Bakar; Chee Chaoming; Ahmad Syahrir bin Mohamad Kamal Saupi	Thailand (THA); Sukij Samee; Bunpot Sillapakong
Team – Class 10	Indonesia (INA); Komet Akbar; Dian David Michael Jacobs; Bangun Sugito; Suwarno	Malaysia (MAS); Mohamad Azwar bin Bakar; Chee Chaoming; Ahmad Syahrir bin Mohamad Kamal Saupi	Vietnam (VIE); Huynh Thanh; Bui Quy Thu

=== Women ===
Event	Gold	Silver	Bronze
Singles – Class 1-2	Chilchitparyak Bootwansirina; Thailand	-	-
Singles – Class 3	Dararat Asayut; Thailand	Pattaravadee Wararitdamrongkul; Thailand	-
Singles – Class 4	Wijittra Jaion; Thailand	Tarsilem; Indonesia	-
Singles – Class 5	Jindaphun Phoungjui; Thailand	Chung Sow Fun; Malaysia	-
Singles – Class 7-8	Josephine Medina; Philippines	Suwarti; Indonesia	Hamida; Indonesia
Singles – Class 7-8	Josephine Medina; Philippines	Suwarti; Indonesia	Kanlaya Kriabklang; Thailand
Singles – Class 9	Chayanan Settisrikoedkun; Thailand	Hana Resti; Indonesia	Wachiraporn Thepmoya; Thailand
Singles – Class 9	Chayanan Settisrikoedkun; Thailand	Hana Resti; Indonesia	Susilawati; Indonesia
Singles – Class 10	Sella Dwi Radayana; Indonesia	Viet Thi Kim Van; Vietnam	Minnie De Ramos Cadag; Philippines
Singles – Class 10	Sella Dwi Radayana; Indonesia	Viet Thi Kim Van; Vietnam	Farahidatul Akmal binti Ilias; Malaysia
Singles – Class 11	Ana Widyasari; Indonesia	Lim Jia Xuan Evelyn; Singapore	-
Doubles – Class 1-5	Thailand (THA); Wijittra Jaion; Dararat Asayut	Indonesia (INA); Osrita Muslim; Tarsilem	Malaysia (MAS); Chung Sow Fun; Tan Kee Chok
Doubles – Class 1-5	Thailand (THA); Wijittra Jaion; Dararat Asayut	Indonesia (INA); Osrita Muslim; Tarsilem	Thailand (THA); Pattaravadee Wararitdamrongkul; Jindaphun Phoungjui
Doubles – Class 8-9	Indonesia (INA); Susilawati; Hana Resti	Indonesia (INA); Suwarti; Hamida	Thailand (THA); Wachiraporn Thepmoya; Chayanan Settisrikoedkun
Doubles – Class 10	Vietnam (VIE); Nguyen Thi Hoa Phuong; Viet Thi Kim Van	Philippines (PHI); Josephine Medina; Minnie De Ramos Cadag	Malaysia (MAS); Farahidatul Akmal binti Ilias; Jamiha binti Mat Ali
Team – Class 1-5	Thailand (THA); Dararat Asayut; Wijittra Jaion; Pattaravadee Wararitdamrongkul; Jindaphun Phoungjui	Indonesia (INA); Osrita Muslim; Tarsilem	Malaysia (MAS); Chung Sow Fun; Tan Kee Chok
Team – Class 7-9	Thailand (THA); Wachiraporn Thepmoya; Chayanan Settisrikoedkun; Kanlaya Kriabklang	Indonesia (INA); Hamida; Susilawati; Hana Resti; Leli Marlina	-
Team – Class 10	Indonesia (INA); Suwarti; Narulita Herlina; Sella Dwi Radayana	Vietnam (VIE); Nguyen Thi Hoa Phuong; Viet Thi Kim Van	Philippines (PHI); Josephine Medina; Minnie De Ramos Cadag
