= Chee Chaoming =

Malaysian para table tennis player (born 1997)

Personal information
- Nationality: Malaysian
- Born: 5 March 1997 (age 29) Ipoh, Perak

Sport
- Sport: Table tennis
- Disability class: 9
Medal record
Para table tennis
Representing Malaysia
Asian Para Games
Gold medal – first place	2018 Jakarta	Men's doubles C8–9
Bronze medal – third place	2014 Incheon	Men's teams C9–10
Bronze medal – third place	2018 Jakarta	Men's singles C9
ASEAN Para Games
Gold medal – first place	2017 Kuala Lumpur	Men's teams C9
Gold medal – first place	2023 Phnom Penh	Men's teams C9
Bronze medal – third place	2017 Kuala Lumpur	Men's singles C9
Bronze medal – third place	2023 Phnom Penh	Men's singles C9
Asian Youth Para Games
Gold medal – first place	2017 Dubai	Boys' singles C9
Gold medal – first place	2017 Dubai	Boys' teams C9

Chee Chaoming is a Malaysian table tennis player. He competed at the 2020 Summer Paralympics in Table tennis in singles C9.
