= Eng Leong Medallic Industries =

Medallion manufacturer in Singapore

Eng Leong Medallic Industries Pte Ltd (ELM Medallist & Jeweller) is a privately owned company based in Singapore, specialising in the manufacture of State and Military Order (honour), Decorations and Medals (ODM) and bespoke gifts.

ELM also has a defence arm, ELS Defence Equipment Pte Ltd, supplying defence and security equipment.

== History ==
In 1968, Chua Kang Leong started Eng Leong Sign Craft at Bellios Lane, off Serangoon Road. Initially the shop manufactured medals for wholesalers.

In 1971, the company began producing plaques, medals and trophies directly to schools for events such as sports competitions. It expanded to producing state regalia and Orders, Decorations and Medals after producing a set of medals for the United Arab Emirates.

In 1996, ELM started manufacturing state medals and ceremonial swords for the Singapore government.

In 2000, ELM created ELS Defence Equipment Pte Ltd to supply defence and security equipment.

In 2006, ELM organised an exhibition, Singapore Honours, showing the medals awarded to Singaporeans.

ELM credits much of the company’s growth over the past 41 years to Singapore’s geographical advantage with English being the primary medium for industry. ELM also benefitted from the combination of Western technology, education and infrastructure and the competitive cost advantages of being located in Asia.
