= Football 5-a-side at the 2015 ASEAN Para Games =

Football 5-a-side at the 2015 ASEAN Para Games was held at Marina Bay Sands, Singapore.

== Medal table ==
Rank	Nation	Gold	Silver	Bronze	Total
1	Malaysia (MAS)	1	0	0	1
2	Thailand (THA)	0	1	0	1
3	Vietnam (VIE)	0	0	1	1
Totals (3 entries)		1	1	1	3

== Medalists ==
Event	Gold	Silver	Bronze
Men	Malaysia (MAS); Mohamad Amirul Arif bin Mahadhir; Mohd Zamha bin Abdul Wahab; Rollen bin Marakim; Mohd Azwan bin Azhar; Mohamad Asri bin Arshad; Azril bin Che Ibrahim; Ahmad Fikri bin Omar; Meor Shahrul Azhar bin Mat Salleh; Shahril bin Che Shafie	Thailand (THA); Srisak Akakarn; Kittikorn Baodee; Sutatchai Khowsaard; Panyawut Kupan; Sanan Phetkrachangsuk; Sinprasert Sermpol; Wayu Yaima; Suriya Yingchuros; Danai Jaruwarakun; Udomvit Ruennark	Vietnam (VIE); Nguyen Ngoc Tien Tien; Vong Thanh Duoc; Tran Viet Hung; Pham Minh Hoang; Vo Thanh Trieu; Le Tan Hung; Nguyen Van Quy
