= Lime (magazine) =

Monthly magazine in Singapore

- Actor Wentworth Miller on the cover of LIME, April 2007
- Editor: Michael Chiang, Angelina George
- Categories: Tabloid, Celebrity, Entertainment
- Frequency: Monthly
- Final issue: October 2008
- Company: MediaCorp
- Country: Singapore
- Language: English
- Website: LIME

LIME was a monthly magazine published under the umbrella of MediaCorp that targeted Asian youths and focused on tabloid breaking news, music, celebrity, entertainment and lifestyle.

The contents in LIME usually featured Asian celebrities and lifestyles of youth in Singapore and was different from 8 Days, another entertainment publication by MediaCorp Publishing.

LIME was published in two editions: Singapore Edition and Malaysia Edition

== Awards ==
The magazine won two awards in ASIA Media Awards 2006 for Best in Design (Silver Award) and in the SOPA Awards 2005 for Excellence in Magazine Design (Honorable Mention).

== Discontinuation ==
Management decided in 2008 that LIME, both in Malaysia and Singapore, would be discontinued. While the Singaporean team was reshuffled to various departments, Angelina George the editor of the Malaysian edition was made Group Sub Editor. Michael Chiang stayed on as editorial consultant. The last issue of the magazine was published in October 2008.
