= CP football at the 2015 ASEAN Para Games =

Football 7-a-side at the 2015 ASEAN Para Games
- Football 7-a-side logo

Tournament details
- Host country: Singapore
- Dates: 3 – 9 December 2015
- Teams: 5
- Venue: 1 (in 1 host city)

Final positions
- Champions: Thailand
- Runners-up: Myanmar
- Third place: Singapore
- Fourth place: Malaysia

Tournament statistics
- Matches played: 12
- Goals scored: 57 (4.75 per match)

7-a-side football at the 2015 ASEAN Para Games were held from 3 to 9 December 2015. There was 1 gold medals in this sport.

== Participating teams ==
- Indonesia
- Malaysia
- Myanmar
- Singapore (hosts)
- Thailand

== Venue ==
The venue used for the 2015 ASEAN Para Games were located in Kallang.

Kallang	CP football at the 2015 ASEAN Para Games is located in Singapore
Stadium: National Stadium	CP football at the 2015 ASEAN Para Games is located in Singapore
Capacity: 55,000	CP football at the 2015 ASEAN Para Games is located in Singapore

== Group stage ==
In the first group stage have seen the teams in a one group of five teams.

Pos	Team	Pld	W	D	L	GF	GA	GD	Pts	Qualified for
1	Thailand	4	4	0	0	21	2	+19	12	Team play for position 1
2	Myanmar	4	2	1	1	13	10	+3	7	Team play for position 1
3	Singapore	4	2	0	2	8	12	−4	6	Team play for the position 3
4	Malaysia	4	1	0	3	9	17	−8	3	Team play for the position 3
5	Indonesia	4	0	1	3	0	10	−10	1	Team have the position 5

Source: The results of the table were determined from the results
Rules for classification: Tie-breaking criteria
3 December 2015
9:30

Singapore	1–0	Indonesia
	Report

National Stadium
3 December 2015
11:30

Thailand	6–1	Malaysia
	Report

National Stadium
4 December 2015
12:30

Malaysia	2–7	Myanmar
	Report

National Stadium
4 December 2015
19:30

Thailand	5–0	Indonesia
	Report

National Stadium
5 December 2015
12:30

Myanmar	5–3	Singapore
	Report

National Stadium
5 December 2015
19:30

Indonesia	0–4	Malaysia
	Report

National Stadium
6 December 2015
12:30

Singapore	0–5	Thailand
	Report

National Stadium
6 December 2015
19:30

Indonesia	0–0	Myanmar
	Report

National Stadium
7 December 2015
12:30

Malaysia	2–4	Singapore
	Report

National Stadium
7 December 2015
19:30

Myanmar	1–5	Thailand
	Report

National Stadium

== Finals ==
=== Bronze-medal match ===
9 December 2015
13:00

Singapore	2–1	Malaysia
	Report

National Stadium

=== Gold-medal match ===
9 December 2015
15:15

Thailand	3–0	Myanmar
	Report

National Stadium

== Statistics ==
=== Ranking ===
Rank	Team
Gold medal	Thailand
Silver medal	Myanmar
Bronze medal	Singapore
4.	Malaysia
5.	Indonesia
