= 2015 ASEAN Para Games =

8th ASEAN Para Games

VIII ASEAN Para Games
- Host city: Singapore
- Motto: Celebrate the Extraordinary
- Nations: 10
- Athletes: 1181
- Events: 336 in 15 sports
- Opening: 3 December
- Closing: 9 December
- Opened by: Tony Tan; President of Singapore
- Closed by: Lee Hsien Loong; Prime Minister of Singapore
- Athlete's Oath: Thomas Yong Phen Chong
- Judge's Oath: Lanny Kwok Ping Ping
- Torch lighter: Yip Pin Xiu, Tay Wei Ming and Aloysius Gan Kai Hong
- Main venue: Singapore Indoor Stadium (Opening Ceremony); Marina Bay Sands ballroom (Closing Ceremony)
- Website: 2015 ASEAN Para Games

The 2015 ASEAN Para Games, officially known as the 8th ASEAN Para Games, and commonly known as Singapore 2015, was a Southeast Asian disabled multi-sport event held from 3 to 9 December 2015 in the city-state of Singapore. Unlike the previous editions the games were held six months after the closing of the 2015 Southeast Asian Games. This was Singapore's first time as host of the ASEAN Para Games.

Around 1811 athletes participated at the Games, which featured 336 events in 15 sports. Singapore is the seventh nation to host the event after Malaysia, Vietnam, Philippines, Thailand, Indonesia and Myanmar. It was opened by Tony Tan Keng Yam, the President of Singapore at the Singapore Indoor Stadium.

The final medal tally was led by Thailand, followed by Indonesia and Malaysia with host Singapore in fifth place.

Singapore has been awarded the rights to host the 2029 Southeast Asian Games, it was also announced that Singapore will host the 2029 ASEAN Para Games. It will be the second time that Singapore hosted the ASEAN Para Games last staging the event in 2015. Singapore will be the third city to host the ASEAN Para Games twice after Indonesia in 2011 and 2022 and Thailand in 2008 and 2026.

== Development and preparation ==
The Singapore ASEAN Para Games Organising Committee (SAPGOC) was formed to oversee the staging of the event.

Steering Committee members of the Games
Position	Name	Designation
APC Chairman	Dato' Zainal Abu Zarin	Asian Paralympic Committee president, ASEAN Para Sports Federation president
Chairman	Mr Lawrence Wong	Acting Minister, Ministry of Culture, Community and Youth. Senior Minister of State, Ministry of Communications and Information
Deputy Chairman	Mr Sam Tan	Minister-of-State, Prime Minister's Office and Ministry of Culture, Community and Youth
Members	Ms Jennie Chua	Chairman, Alexandra Health System Pte Ltd
Members	Lim Teck Yin	Chairman, Executive Committee, Singapore ASEAN Para Games Organising Committee
Members	Ms Low Yen Ling	Parliamentary Secretary, Ministry of Social and Family Development and Ministry of Culture, Community and Youth, Mayor of South West District
Members		Vice Chairman, Autism Association Singapore
Members	Ms Denise Phua	Mayor, Central Singapore District; Supervisor, Pathlight School
Members	Mr Richard Seow	Chairman, Sport Singapore
Members	Ms Sim Ann	Minister-of-State, Ministry of Communications and Information and Ministry of Education
Members	Ms Tan Yen Yen	Regional Vice-president & Managing Director, South Asia Pacific, SAS Institute Pte Ltd
Members	Dr Teo-Koh Sock Miang	Chairman, Singapore National Paralympic Council, President, Singapore Disability Sports Council
Members	Dr Wong Meng Ee	Assistant Professor, Early Childhood and Special Needs Education, National Institute of Education
Members	Ms Yeoh Chee Yan	Permanent Secretary, Ministry of Culture, Community and Youth
Members	Ms Yip Pin Xiu	Paralympic Gold Medalist

=== Venues ===
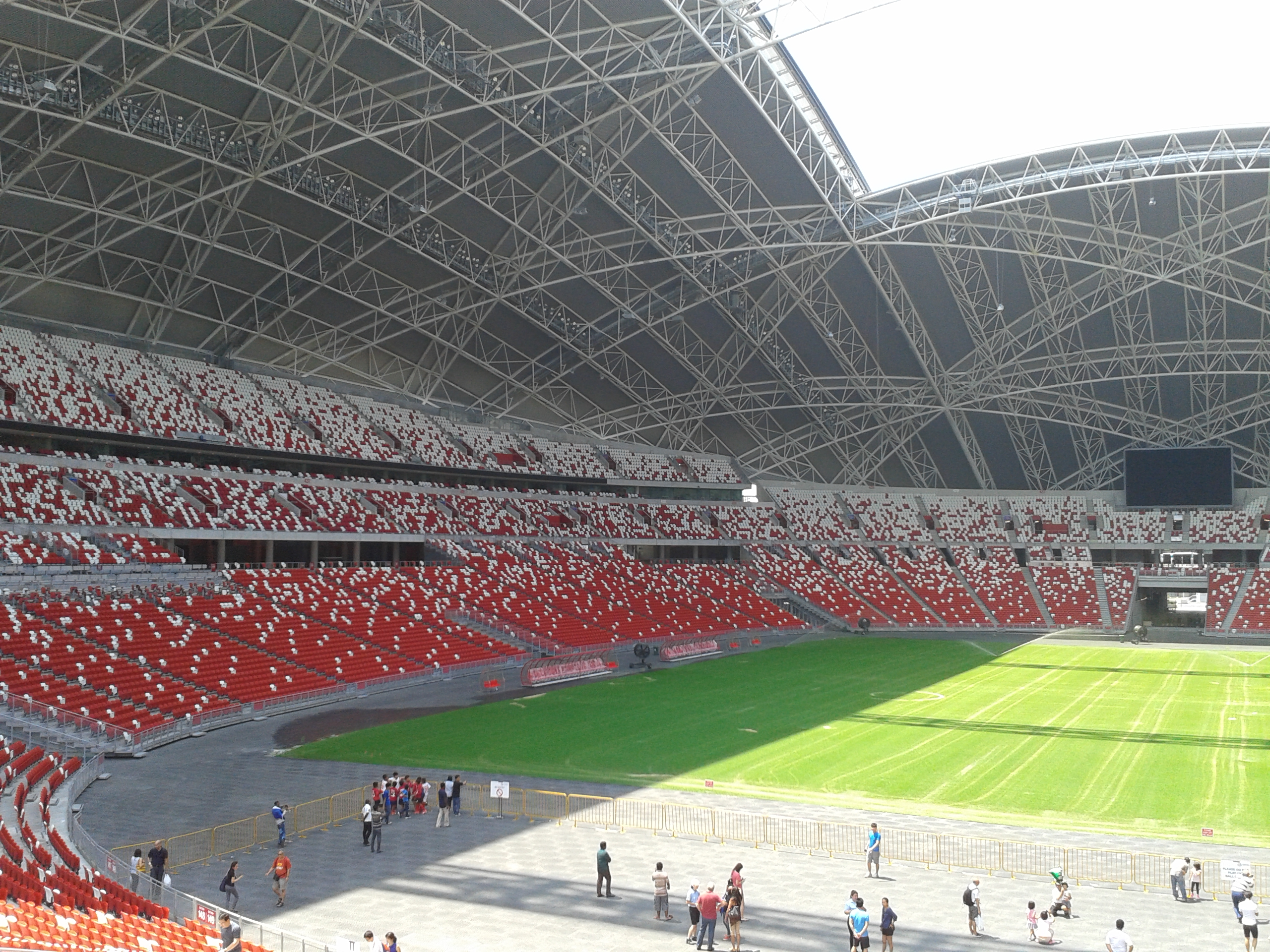
Singapore National Stadium, venue of the athletics and football 7-a-side event of the 8th ASEAN Para Games.

The 2015 ASEAN Para Games used a mix of new, existing and temporary venues. Given the city-state's compact size, most venues were pre-existing public-sporting facilities located in the suburban heartlands which will revert to public use after the games. No major retrofitting work were done in most venues as most had been used to host major multi-disciplinary events such as the 2010 Youth Olympic Games and the 2015 Southeast Asian Games.

At the centrepiece of the activities was the Singapore Sports Hub which was completed in mid-2014 and was used to host the 2015 Southeast Asian Games. Incorporating the new 55,000-seat national stadium, it hosted most of the events.

A games village was not built as in the 2015 Southeast Asian Games. Instead, a "village in the city" concept saw athletes and officials housed in Marina Bay Sands Hotel downtown Singapore which was chosen to be the official games village because of its ability to cater to people with special needs. The hotel reaffirmed its commitment to its corporate social responsibility programmes, and is looking to raise awareness among the public about para-sports. Besides being physically near to the Singapore Sports Hub and offering about 1500 rooms for usage, it was hoped that it will add vibe to the city and reduce post-games costs in converting a dedicated games village to other uses.

The 8th ASEAN Para Games had 14 venues for the games.

Nation	Competition Venue	Sports
Singapore	Singapore Sports Hub
Singapore	Singapore National Stadium	Athletics, Football 7-a-side
Singapore	Singapore Indoor Stadium	Wheelchair basketball, Opening ceremony
Singapore	OCBC Arena Hall 1	Table tennis
Singapore	OCBC Arena Hall 2	Badminton
Singapore	OCBC Arena Hall 3	Boccia
Singapore	OCBC Arena Hall 4	Chess
Singapore	OCBC Aquatics Centre	Swimming
Singapore	Marina Bay Sands
Singapore	Marina Bay Sands Hall B	Football 5-a-side, Powerlifting
Singapore	Marina Bay Sands Hall D	Goalball
Singapore	Marina Bay Sands Ballroom	Closing ceremony
Singapore	Other
Singapore	Marina Bay	Sailing
Singapore	SAFRA Yishun	Shooting
Singapore	Temasek Club	Bowling
Singapore	Kallang Cricket Field	Archery

=== Public transport ===
Given the existing extensive public transport network already in place, there is no games-specific major infrastructural development to support it. Bus, Mass Rail Transit and van services were provided to athletes, officials and VIP guests to reach the games venues and many of them were equipped with platform to load wheelchair-users especially wheelchair-using athletes and officials.

=== Volunteers ===
The organisers estimated that about 3,000 volunteers are needed to successfully host the games. As of 21 November 2015, about 4,300 public members have signed up as volunteers.

=== Ticketing ===
Tickets for all ASEAN Para Games events are free while paid tickets are required for the Opening Ceremony.

=== Countdown ===
During the closing ceremony of the 2014 ASEAN Para Games, the APSF Flag was formally handed over to Singapore from Myanmar. This was followed by a song and dance section highlighting Singapore as the next venue.

From 3 to 9 December 2014, a series of festivities called the "Treerific Christmas" were held to mark the one year countdown to the games, featuring disability sports such as javelin, shooting, bowling and Boccia which were available for public try out.

From 25 July to 1 November, Sport Without Boundaries Roadshows were held at 4 venues from 10:30 to 17:30 SST across Singapore to introduce para sports to the community and increase their awareness of para sports and the upcoming 8th ASEAN Para Games (APG). It featured sports for public try out such as Boccia, Goalball, football 5-a-side, table tennis, and wheelchair basketball.

=== Costs ===
Projected cost of the games was at SGD 75 million.

=== Torch relay ===
A torch relay was held at the Marina Bay on 3 December 2015 before the games' opening ceremony.

== Marketing ==
=== Logo ===
The logo of the 2015 ASEAN Para Games is inspired by the 28th SEA Games logo and is an image depicts the human figures and arms, raised in jubilation and seamlessly joined, weave together to form the shape of a heart, represents the values of the International Paralympic movement of Spirit in motion and the gumption to overcome challenges, and the indomitable triumph of the human spirit. The radiance of the colour palette represents the dynamism of sport. The three figures also represent inclusiveness, uplifting and transforming sports with disabilities, and national pride and represents the unity of competing athletes, as individuals, as a movement, and as a region, reaching for extraordinary.

=== Sponsors ===
A total of 32 sponsors, comprising 4 Main sponsors, 10 Official sponsors and 18 Official partners contributed to the 2015 ASEAN Para Games. The broadcasting rights of the main sponsor MediaCorp is owned by MediaCorp TV.

Main sponsors

- MediaCorp
- Deloitte
- Cycle & Carriage
- FBT

Official sponsors

- Havas Media Singapore
- City Neon Singapore
- 100Plus
- DBS Bank

Official sponsors (continue)

- Yonex
- CitiCall
- Anderco
- 883JiaFM SAFRA
- Focus Media Singapore
- Suntec Singapore

Official partners

- Singapore Changi Airport
- ComfortDelGro

Official partners (continue)

- Eng Leong Medallic Industries
- London School of Business and Finance
- Molten
- Oversea-Chinese Banking Corporation
- Osim
- Ottobock
- Peck Tiong Choon
- Positive Intentions

Official partners (continue)

- Rajah & Tann
- Resorts World Sentosa
- SAFRA National Service Association
- Singapore National Eye Centre
- Standard Chartered
- Temasek Club
- Unearthed Productions
- Weber Shandwick

=== Mascot ===
Nila, the mascot of the 2015 Southeast Asian Games, is the mascot for the 2015 ASEAN Para Games too.

== The games ==
=== Opening ceremony ===
The opening ceremony was held on Thursday, 3 December 2015, beginning at 20:00 SST (UTC+8) at the Singapore Indoor Stadium in Singapore. There were five section of performance dubbed the movements in the opening ceremony, which were Stretching the Boundaries, A World of Creative Possibilities, Shooting For the Best, Fire Your Imagination and Celebration of the Extraordinary. The opening ceremony was designed by creative designer Phillip Tan and was helmed by 661 performers including Lily Goh, Samantha Gray, Daniel Purnomo, Sumbut Simla and Li Chi Chao, 120 motivators, 174 volunteers and 454 students mostly from Singapore's special education schools and 75 creative team members.

The ceremony begins with the first movement, the Stretching the Boundaries where Singapore shooter Aishah Samad was seen at the stage for a short moment after the video footage featuring Singapore's scenery with Charlie Lim's "Still" as background music, followed by a group of dancers from Nanyang Academy of Fine Arts (NAFA) consists of 7 different nationalities dancing led by an autistic girl dancer, Luo Mang. The performance proceeds with the entrance of VIP guests including Singapore President Tony Tan Keng Yam. The National Anthem of Singapore was performed by students of Cannosian School including Vivian Voo, Cerebral Palsy alliance of Singapore including Rosemary, the Association for persons with special needs, Rainbow Centre, School of the arts, Sin Ming Secondary School and Nanyang Primary School as the national flag of Singapore was raised. Neo Yew Kim interprets the national anthem using sign language while Raghavendran Rajarekan performed the national anthem with the Bansui flute. The countdown video depicts clay figure made by Singapore school students of Association For Special Needs that resembles numbers from 10 to 1. Then, athletes of participating nations paraded into the stadium to the ASEAN traditional music, followed by speeches addressed by Grace Fu, Ministry of Culture, Community and Youth of Singapore and Zainal Abu Zarin, President of the ASEAN Para Sports Federation and the declaration of the games opening by president Tony Tan Keng Yam and the raising of the APSF and the games flag with the playing of Anthem of the Future, the anthem of the Paralympic movement and drum majors Haikal Rosli and Jonah Chi Jee Hong playing the baton on the stage. The movement told the story of how the athletes push the boundaries and move beyond them.

Order	Nation	Flag bearer	Sport
1	Brunei (BRU)	Alihan Muda	Athletics
2	Cambodia (CAM)	Van Vun	Athletics
3	Indonesia (INA)	Anto Boi	Powerlifting
4	Laos (LAO)	Eay Simay	Powerlifting
5	Malaysia (MAS)	Mohamad Ridzuan Mohamad Puzi	Athletics
6	Myanmar (MYA)	Myo Swe	Athletics
7	Philippines (PHI)	Sander Saverino	Chess
8	Thailand (THA)	Rawat Tana	Athletics
9	Vietnam (VIE)	Le Van Cong	Powerlifting
10	Singapore (SIN)	Yip Pin Xiu	Swimming

Second movement in line is A World of Creative Possibilities performed by students from Grace Orchard School and Anglo Chinese School and Natasha Michella of School of the Arts, with a map of Singapore designed by Special Education students at the background. The movement told the story about human creativity and reflects ASEAN Para Sports Federation vision for pursuing equality in sports and life. This was followed by movement 3, the Shooting For The Best performance in which dance troop Redeafination doing the glow in the dark dance, followed by oath taken by Yong Phen Chong for athletes, Lanny Kwok Ping Ping for judges and officials and Muhammad Hosni for Coaches and Personal Best performance which depicts the video of the voice of athletes from participating nations and performance by Lui Chee Chau, a Malaysian pianist and Indah Wahyu, an Indonesian singer. The movement told the story about how the athletes try their best to pursuit victory and improve their performance.

In the fourth movement, the Fire Your Imagination, Choo Poh Choon, Jason Chee, Yap Qian Yin, Renee Joy Tan, Neoh Yew Kim and dancers from Asia Women Welfare Association doing performances with a person playing flute and two students doing the hand sign dance to express their dreams, followed by the video Because I am a Champion, showing the fighting spirit of Singapore para athletes. A group of athletes then passed the torch flame one after another before it was passed to Yip Pin Xiu, who lit the flame on the cauldron with Tay Wei Ming of Badminton and Gan Kai Hong Aloysius of Boccia. The torch bearer are R. Nadesan Kalai Vanen of Powerlifting, Benson Tan Eng Kiong of Swimming, Aishah Samad of Shooting and Toh Wei Soong of Swimming. The movement told the story about human's imagination that resulted from their dreams. In the fifth movement, the Celebration of the Extraordinary, performers of the previous performances gather with the Taiko drum, Timpani and electric guitar players and mascot Nila to do the finale alongside performers mostly from Evergreen Secondary School, Metta School, Association of persons with Special needs, I am Soul, Yishun Park and Chaoyang School. The ceremony concludes with President leaving the stadium while meet and greeting athletes and performers who attended the ceremony along the way.

=== Closing ceremony ===
The closing ceremony was held on Wednesday, 9 December 2015, from 20:00 SST (UTC+8) at the Marina Bay Sands ballroom in Singapore. Athletes and guests were treated with a series of dances and performances and the dinner served at the ballroom. After that, Prime minister Lee Hsien Loong declared the games closed. The torch was extinguished and the ASEAN Para Games responsibilities was officially handed over to Malaysia, host of the 2017 ASEAN Para Games where Saravanan Murugan receives the flag of the ASEAN Para Sports Federation as its symbol from Zainal Abu Zarin and Lanny Kwok Ping Ping during a flag handover ceremony. The national anthem of Malaysia was played as the National flag of Malaysia was raised. A Malaysia segment performance was also performed by a drum band named Republic of Gendang, highlighting Malaysia as the next host of the ASEAN Para Games.

=== Participating nations ===
Around 1181 athletes and 500 officials had participated in the games.

- Brunei (28 athletes)
- Cambodia (30)
- Indonesia (188)
- Laos (40)
- Malaysia (191)
- Myanmar (102)
- Philippines (64)
- Singapore (299)
- Thailand (260)
- Vietnam (127)

Did not enter

- East Timor was suspended by the International Paralympic Committee, hence the ASEAN Para Sports Federation decided to bare the country from participating at the games.

=== Sports ===
The Singapore ASEAN Para Games Organising Committee (SAPGOC) had confirmed a total of 15 sports for the 8th ASEAN Para Games. This was the most number of sports offered at the ASEAN Para Games in its history. The announcement took place after the sports were endorsed at the 1st ASEAN Para Sports Federation Board of Governors' Meeting at Marina Bay Sands.

- Archery (6)
- Athletics (112)
- Badminton (15)
- Boccia (7)
- Bowling (14)
- Chess (24)
- Football 7-a-side (1)
- Football 5-a-side (1)
- Goalball (2)
- Powerlifting (19)
- Sailing (3)
- Shooting (7)
- Swimming (86)
- Table Tennis (37)
- Wheelchair basketball (2)

=== Calendar ===
OC	Opening ceremony	●	Event competitions	1	Gold medal events	CC	Closing ceremony

December	3 Thu	4 Fri	5 Sat	6 Sun	7 Mon	8 Tue	9 Wed	Events
Ceremonies	OC						CC	
Archery			●	3	3			6
Athletics		22	17	24	18	21	10	112
Badminton		1	●	4	1	9		15
Boccia			●	●	4	●	3	7
Bowling		7	5	2				14
Football 7-a-side	●	●	●	●	●		1	1
Chess		●	●	12	●	12		24
Football 5-a-side		●		●		1		1
Goalball		●	●	●	●	●	2	2
Powerlifting			4	2	5	8		19
Sailing				●	1	2		3
Shooting		2	2	2	1			7
Swimming		22	15	14	25	10		86
Table tennis		1	9	9	1	17		37
Wheelchair basketball				●	●	1	1	2
Daily medal events	0	55	52	72	59	81	17	336
Cumulative total	0	55	107	179	238	319	336	336
December	3 Thu	4 Fri	5 Sat	6 Sun	7 Mon	8 Tue	9 Wed	Total events

=== Medal table ===
The 2015 ASEAN Para Games featured 336 events, resulting in 336 medal sets to be distributed.

Two bronze medals were awarded in most events in racket sports: 10 in Badminton and 21 in Table tennis, giving a total of 31 additional bronze medals. On the other hand, 12 silver and 46 bronze medals were not awarded in 46 events in 8 sports competed at the games due to few number of participants. These are: Archery (2 bronze), Athletics (4 silver and 16 bronze), Badminton (2 bronze), Boccia (1 silver and 2 bronze), Chess (8 bronze), Powerlifting (4 silver and 4 bronze), Swimming (3 bronze) and Table tennis (3 silver and 9 bronze).

As a result, a total of 981 medals comprising 336 gold medals, 324 silver medals and 321 bronze medals were awarded to athletes.

The host Singapore's performance was its best ever yet in ASEAN Para Games History and was placed fifth overall among participating nations.

* Host nation (Singapore)

2015 ASEAN Para Games medal table
Rank	NPC	Gold	Silver	Bronze	Total
1	Thailand	95	76	79	250
2	Indonesia	81	74	63	218
3	Malaysia	52	58	37	147
4	Vietnam	48	58	50	156
5	Singapore*	24	17	22	63
6	Myanmar	16	17	29	62
7	Philippines	16	17	26	59
8	Brunei	3	3	6	12
9	Cambodia	1	2	6	9
10	Laos	0	2	3	5
Totals (10 entries)		336	324	321	981

== Broadcasting ==
Sport Singapore hosted live video stream at its YouTube channel. An official mobile application for the games was also released which featured live streams of selected sports events, schedules, results and other promotional materials. In Malaysia, Radio Televisyen Malaysia broadcasts the daily highlights of the games from 4 to 10 December 2015.

== See also ==
- 2015 Southeast Asian Games

Preceded by Naypyidaw	ASEAN Para Games; Singapore; VIII ASEAN Para Games (2015)	Succeeded by Kuala Lumpur
