= Singapore national cerebral palsy football team =

Singapore National Cerebral Palsy Football Team
- Nickname(s): CP Lions
- Federation: Singapore Disability Sports Council
- Captain: Muhammad Mubarak bin Md. Rastam
- Home stadium: Queenstown Stadium
- IFCPF ranking: 32
- Highest IFCPF ranking: 21 (September 2012, 2016)
- Lowest IFCPF ranking: 32 (December 2016)

Singapore national cerebral palsy football team is the national cerebral football team for Singapore that represents the team in international competitions. Singapore has participated in a number of international tournaments, but never the Paralympic Games.

== Background ==
Singapore Disability Sports Council is in charge of managing the national team. In 2012, Peter Schmeichel held a national team player training camp at Jalan Besar Stadium. National team development is supported by an International Federation of Cerebral Palsy Football (IFCPF) recognized national championship. Recognized years for the national IFCPF recognized competition include 2010, 2011, 2012, 2013, 2014, and 2015.

In May 2013, an IFCPF coaching workshop was held in Austria. It was attended by coaches from Austria, Singapore, Italy, Denmark and Jordan. The goal is to develop coaches for both national and international level competitions. Ahead of the 2015 ASEAN Para Games, the team was facing a funding and support crisis. They were unable to get jerseys comparable to that of the no-disability football men's team. Equipment used for training was used and worn out. They could not train with goals sized for their sport or on a field sized for their sport. They decided that they needed to change their off pitch focus to trying to get interest from local football fans who were disappointed with the performance of the non-disability side. Their performance at the 2015 ASEAN Para Games assisted them in accomplishing this goal. In March 2015, Singapora men's national football vice-captain Hariss Harun trained with the team as part of their ASEAN Para Games preparations.

Singapore was active internationally by 2016, and had national championships to support national team player development. The team's official grounds were named in April 2016 as Queenstown Stadium as a result of actions undertaken by Sport Singapore on their behalf. The Ministry of State for Culture, Community and Youth was also working in 2016 on greater inclusion for sportspeople with disabilities in order to increase their opportunities to participate at the highest level. Prior to the use of Queenstown Stadium the team trained at Hong Kah Secondary School.

The team was coached by Mohamed Zainudeen since 2013, going into 2016.

== Players ==
There have been a number of players for the Singaporean squad. Khairul Anwar Bin Kasmani has been team captain for several years. Khairul Anwar Bin Kasmani's performance at the 2015 ASEAN Para Games was such that he was the first Singaporean player to score a hat trick at the recently opened National Stadium. In 2015, Khairul was nominated in The Straits Times' Athlete of the Year.

Name	Number	Classification	Position	Years active	Ref
Muhammad Nizam Abdull Rahman		FT5		2014, 2016	
Balasubramaniam Annamalai		FT6		2014, 2016	
Muhammad Taufiq Baharin		FT7		2016	
Muhammad Shahidil Bin Saidi		FT6	Defender/Forward	2016	
Suhaimi Sudar		FT6	Defender	2014, 2016	
Lim Zhi Guang Ivan		FT5		2016	
Peter Kam		FT5	Goalkeeper	2014, 2016	
Khairul Anwar Bin Kasmani (C)		FT7	Midfielder	2014, 2016	
Muhammad Firdaus Mohamed Noor		FT5	Goalkeeper	2014, 2016	
Muhammad Mubarak Md Rastam		FT7	Forward	2014, 2016	
Muhammad Shafiq Ariff		FT7	Striker	2014, 2016	
Ngiau Hai Wan (Gabriel) Ngiau Meng Hai		FT8		2014, 2016	
Harun Rahamad		FT5		2014, 2016	
Hitesh G Ramchandani		FT6		2014, 2016	
Abdul Mahdi Abdul Rahman		FT8	Defender	2016	
Jeremiah Tan		FT5	Forward	2016	
Muhammad Danial Ismail		FT7	Goalkeeper	2016	

== Ranking ==
Singapore was ranked 21st in the world by the IFCPF in 2016. The team was also ranked 5th regionally in Asia-Oceania in 2016. In November 2014, Singapore was ranked 22nd. In August 2013, Singapore was 23rd. In September 2012, Singapore was 21st.

== Results ==
The country has never participated in a Paralympic Games since the sport made its debut at the 1984 Games. Singapore has participated in a number of international tournaments.

In 2013, the team participated in the Football Development Tournament in Vienna. The tournament was organized by Austrian Disability Sports Federation (OBSV), with Germany, the Netherlands, Austria and Singapore all participating. Later that year, the team won a silver medal at the ASEAN Para Games. In 2014, a 12 player strong Singapore squad went to Myanmar to play in a regional tournament that included hosts Myanmar and Thailand in preparation for the ASEAN Para Games. Singapore won bronze at the 2015 ASEAN Para Games, after defeating Malaysia 2 - 1 in the placement match. Muhammad Shafiq scored the first goal for Singapore before the team's defense allowed Malaysia's Mohamad Sobri Ghazali to score the equalizer. In the forty-third minute, Muhammad Mubarak Md Rastam scored the team's go ahead goal. It was his first of the tournament. 5,323 people attended the bronze medal match in Singapore. Twenty-nine-year-old captain Khairul Anwar Bin Kasmani finished the ASEAN Para Games as the leading scorer, with five goals scored in the tournament. The first game of the ASEAN Para Games was against Indonesia, with Bin Kasmani opening scoring for Singapore in the waning minutes of the game to give Singapore a 1 - 0 victory. In Singapore's second match against Myanmar, Bin Kasmani scored from the midfield.

Competition	Location	Year	Total Teams	Result	Ref
ASEAN Para Games	Singapore	2015	5	3	
Asian Para Games	Incheon, South Korea	2014	4	4	
ASEAN Para Games	Myanmar	2013		2	
Football Development Tournament	Vienna, Austria	2013	4		
Dream Asia	Dubai, United Arab Emirates	2012		3	
