= Malaysia at the 2017 ASEAN Para Games =

- IPC code: MAS
- NPC: Malaysian Paralympic Council
- Website: www.paralympic.org.my (in English)

in Malaysia
- Competitors: 326 in 16 sports
- Flag bearers: Muhammad Ziyad Zolkefli (athletics); Abdul Latif Romly (athletics)
- Officials: 167
- Medals Ranked 2nd: Gold 90 Silver 85 Bronze 83 Total 258

ASEAN Para Games appearances (overview)
- 2001; 2003; 2005; 2008; 2009; 2011; 2014; 2015; 2017; 2022; 2023

Malaysia participated in the 2017 ASEAN Para Games from 17 to 23 September 2017 as the host nation of the 9th edition of the Games. The Malaysian contingent was represented by 326 athletes and 167 officials.

In all, Malaysian contingents collected a haul of 90 gold medals, below than the targeted 103 gold medals. They also been awarded with 85 silver and 83 bronze medals, concluding the Games as second ranked nation.

== Medal summary ==
=== Medal by sport ===
Medals by sport
| Sport | 1st place, gold medalist(s) | 2nd place, silver medalist(s) | 3rd place, bronze medalist(s) | Total | Rank |
|---|---|---|---|---|---|
| Archery | 1 | 2 | 3 | 6 | 3 |
| Athletics | 36 | 27 | 30 | 93 | 2 |
| Badminton | 4 | 3 | 8 | 15 | 2 |
| Boccia | 0 | 4 | 2 | 6 | 2 |
| Bowling | 11 | 9 | 4 | 24 | (1) |
| Chess | 2 | 2 | 2 | 6 | 4 |
| Cycling | 22 | 12 | 5 | 39 | (1) |
| Football 5-a-side | 0 | 0 | 1 | 1 | 3 |
| Football 7-a-side | 0 | 0 | 1 | 1 | 3 |
| Goalball | 1 | 0 | 1 | 2 | 2 |
| Powerlifting | 1 | 4 | 5 | 10 | 4 |
| Sitting volleyball | 0 | 0 | 0 | 0 | – |
| Swimming | 9 | 17 | 10 | 36 | 3 |
| Table tennis | 1 | 2 | 8 | 11 | 4 |
| Wheelchair basketball | 0 | 2 | 0 | 2 | 2 |
| Wheelchair tennis | 2 | 1 | 3 | 6 | (1) |
| Total | 90 | 85 | 83 | 258 | 2 |

=== Medal by Date ===
Medals by date
| Day | Date | 1st place, gold medalist(s) | 2nd place, silver medalist(s) | 3rd place, bronze medalist(s) | Total |
|---|---|---|---|---|---|
| 0 | 17 September | 7 | 5 | 1 | 13 |
| 1 | 18 September | 11 | 11 | 7 | 29 |
| 2 | 19 September | 14 | 7 | 14 | 35 |
| 3 | 20 September | 21 | 21 | 20 | 62 |
| 4 | 21 September | 18 | 21 | 13 | 52 |
| 5 | 22 September | 18 | 18 | 23 | 59 |
| 6 | 23 September | 1 | 2 | 5 | 8 |
| Total | | 90 | 85 | 83 | 258 |

== Medalists ==
| Medal | Name | Sport | Event | Date |
|---|---|---|---|---|
| Gold | Adi Raimie Amizazahan | Cycling | Men Kilometer (C1, C2, C3) | 17 September |
| Gold | Mohd Najib Turano | Cycling | Men Kilometer (C4) | 17 September |
| Gold | Nur Azlia Syafinaz Mohd Zais | Cycling | Women Sprint (B) | 17 September |
| Gold | Muhammad Afiq Afify Rizan | Cycling | Men Sprint (B) | 17 September |
| Gold | Zuhairie Ahmad Tarmizi | Cycling | Men Kilometer (C5) | 17 September |
| Gold | Nur Azlia Syafinaz Mohd Zais | Cycling | Women Kilometer (B) | 17 September |
| Gold | Muhammad Afiq Afify Rizan | Cycling | Men Kilometer (B) | 17 September |
| Gold | Siti Noor Radiah Ismail | Athletics | Women Long Jump T20 | 18 September |
| Gold | Faridul Masri | Athletics | Men Javelin Throw F56 | 18 September |
| Gold | Eddy Bernard | Athletics | Men 100M T37 | 18 September |
| Gold | Muhamad Afiq Mohamad Ali Hanafiah | Athletics | Men 100M T12 | 18 September |
| Gold | Nur Azlia Syafinaz Mohd Zais | Cycling | Women 3000m Individual Pursuit (B) | 18 September |
| Gold | Hemala Devi Eni Kutty | Athletics | Women Discus Throw F12 | 18 September |
| Gold | Muhammad Amin Najmi Romzi | Cycling | Men 4000m Individual Pursuit (B) | 18 September |
| Gold | Shukor Farhan Suliman | Cycling | Mixed 3000m Individual Pursuit (C1, C2, C3) | 18 September |
| Gold | Siti Noor Iasah Mohamad Ariffin | Athletics | Women 800M T20 | 18 September |
| Gold | Mohd Najib Turano | Cycling | Men 4000m Individual Pursuit (C4) | 18 September |
| Gold | Zuhairie Ahmad Tarmizi | Cycling | Men 4000m Individual Pursuit (C5) | 18 September |
| Gold | Eddy Bernard | Athletics | Men Long Jump T37 | 19 September |
| Gold | Hemala Devi Eni Kutty | Athletics | Women Shot Put F11/12 | 19 September |
| Gold | Anas Zul Amirul Sidi | Swimming | Men 100m Freestyle S14 | 19 September |
| Gold | Mohamad Erwan Mohd Hasnoor | Athletics | Men Long Jump T38 | 19 September |
| Gold | Zulhaizat Zainal Abidin | Athletics | Men 400m T13 | 19 September |
| Gold | Yoong Chung Wei | Swimming | Men 50m Butterfly S14 | 19 September |
| Gold | Jamery Siga | Swimming | Men 50m Butterfly S5 | 19 September |
| Gold | Muhamad Hairul Miran | Bowling | Mixed Singles TPB1 | 19 September |
| Gold | Noor Lizah Salman | Bowling | Women Singles TPB8 | 19 September |
| Gold | Nasharuddin Mohd | Athletics | Men 400m T20 | 19 September |
| Gold | Thavanesvaran Subramaniam | Athletics | Men 400m T44 | 19 September |
| Gold | Umi Syuhadah Idris | Athletics | Women Shot Put F37 | 19 September |
| Gold | Muhamad Ashraf Muhammad Haisham | Athletics | Men 800m T46 | 19 September |
| Silver | Yusof Hafizi Shaharuddin | Cycling | Men Kilometer (C1, C2, C3) | 17 September |
| Silver | Muhammad Hafiz Jamali | Cycling | Men Kilometer (C4) | 17 September |
| Silver | Muhammad Amin Najmi Romzi | Cycling | Men Sprint (B) | 17 September |
| Silver | Nur Syahida Tajudin | Cycling | Women Kilometer (B) | 17 September |
| Silver | Muhammad Amin Najmi Romzi | Cycling | Men Kilometer (B) | 17 September |
| Silver | Lim Carmen | Swimming | Women 100m Freestyle S8 | 18 September |
| Silver | Zadrian Chan Zhi Weng | Swimming | Men 200m Freestyle S14 | 18 September |
| Silver | Anderson Anak Jamba | Swimming | Men 50m Breaststroke SB3 | 18 September |
| Silver | Julius Jaranding | Swimming | Men 50m Breaststroke SB13 | 18 September |
| Silver | Nani Shahiera Zawawi | Athletics | Women Long Jump T20 | 18 September |
| Silver | Jacklon Ganding | Athletics | Men 100m T37 | 18 September |
| Silver | Eryanto Bahtiar | Athletics | Men Long Jump T46/47 | 18 September |
| Silver | Nurul Rabiatul Adawiyah Bakri | Powerlifting | Women Up To 41.00 kg - (Snatch) | 18 September |
| Silver | Muhammad Afiq Afify Rizan | Cycling | Men 4000m Individual Pursuit (B) | 18 September |
| Silver | Muhd Nabil Rosli | Cycling | Mixed 3000m Individual Pursuit (C1, C2, C3) | 18 September |
| Silver | Maswinah Suanang | Athletics | Women 800m T20 | 18 September |
| Silver | Jamery Siga | Swimming | Men 200m Freestyle S5 | 19 September |
| Silver | Julius Jaranding | Swimming | Men 100m Freestyle S12 | 19 September |
| Silver | Mohd Rizal Hassan | Bowling | Mixed Singles TPB3 | 19 September |
| Silver | Mohd Azrin Rahim | Bowling | Mixed Singles TPB9 | 19 September |
| Silver | Ruzila Mustafa | Bowling | Women Singles TPB8 | 19 September |
| Silver | Muhammad Nurdin Ibrahim | Athletics | Men 800m T20 | 19 September |
| Bronze | Nur Syahida Tajudin | Cycling | Women Sprint (B) | 17 September |
| Bronze | Puteri Nur Diyana Jawahir | Swimming | Women 50m Breaststroke SB14 | 18 September |
| Bronze | Mohd Adib Iqbal Abdullah | Swimming | Men 50m Breaststroke SB14 | 18 September |
| Bronze | Mohamad Erwan Mohd Hasnoor | Athletics | Men 100m T38 | 18 September |
| Bronze | Felicia Mikat | Athletics | Women 100m T13 | 18 September |
| Bronze | Nur Syahida Tajudin | Cycling | Women 3000m Individual Pursuit (B) | 18 September |
| Bronze | Noor Kalsum Fadil | Athletics | Women Discus Throw F12 | 18 September |
| Bronze | Nur Faizah Aziz | Cycling | Mixed 3000m Individual Pursuit (C1, C2, C3) | 18 September |
| Bronze | Zadrian Chan Zhi Weng | Swimming | Men 100m Freestyle S14 | 19 September |
| Bronze | Amir Firdauss Jamaluddin | Athletics | Men Long Jump T38 | 19 September |
| Bronze | Hisam Che Soh | Athletics | Men Long Jump T38 | 19 September |
| Bronze | James Wong Tien Yu | Swimming | Men 100m Breaststroke SB8 | 19 September |
| Bronze | Muhammad Nur Syaiful Zulkafli | Swimming | Men 50m Butterfly S5 | 19 September |
| Bronze | Gustin Anak Jenang | Powerlifting | Men Up To 59.00 kg - (Snatch) | 19 September |
| Bronze | Noresham Manaf | Bowling | Mixed Singles TPB3 | 19 September |
| Bronze | Abu Bakar Nyat | Bowling | Mixed Singles TPB9 | 19 September |
| Bronze | Saiful Dawang | Athletics | Men Long Jump T42/44 | 19 September |
| Bronze | Doriah Poulus | Athletics | Women Discus Throw F42/43/44 | 19 September |
| Bronze | Felicia Mikat | Athletics | Women 400m T13 | 19 September |
| Bronze | Abdul Halim Badruddin | Athletics | Men 800m T38 | 19 September |
| Bronze | Richard Anak Bada | Athletics | Men Javelin Throw F40/41 | 19 September |
