= Ernie Gawilan =

Filipino Paralympic swimmer

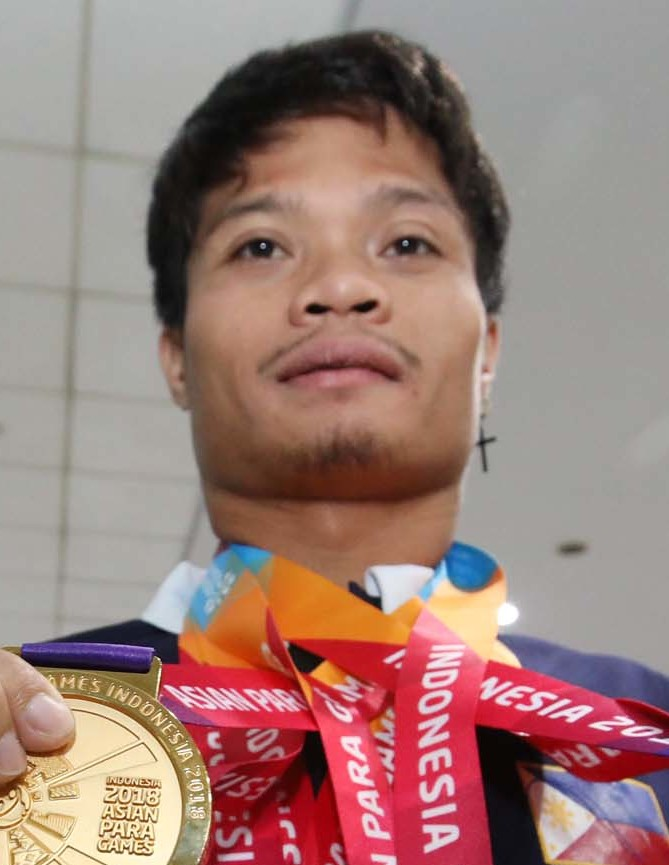
- Gawilan in 2018

Personal information
- Full name: Ernie Agat Gawilan
- Nationality: Philippines
- Born: May 5, 1991 (age 35) Paquibato, Davao City, Philippines

Sport
- Sport: Swimming
- Strokes: butterfly, backstroke, freestyle
- Classifications: S8, SB7, SM8; S7, SB7, SM7
Medal record
Men's paralympic swimming
Representing Philippines
Event	1st	2nd	3rd
Asian Para Games	5	2	4
ASEAN Para Games	9	3	3
Total	14	5	7
Asian Para Games
Gold medal – first place	2018 Jakarta	400m freestyle S7
Gold medal – first place	2018 Jakarta	100m backstroke S7
Gold medal – first place	2018 Jakarta	200m individual medley SM7
Gold medal – first place	2022 Hangzhou	400m freestyle S7
Gold medal – first place	2026 Aichi–Nagoya	400m freestyle S7
Silver medal – second place	2018 Jakarta	100m freestyle S7
Silver medal – second place	2018 Jakarta	50m freestyle S7
Bronze medal – third place	2014 Incheon	200m individual medley SM8
Bronze medal – third place	2014 Incheon	400m freestyle S8
Bronze medal – third place	2014 Incheon	100m freestyle S8
Bronze medal – third place	2022 Hangzhou	200m individual medley SM7
ASEAN Para Games
Gold medal – first place	2014 Naypyidaw	200m individual medley SM8
Gold medal – first place	2014 Naypyidaw	400m freestyle S8
Gold medal – first place	2014 Naypyidaw	100m freestyle S8
Gold medal – first place	2015 Singapore	200m individual medley SM8
Gold medal – first place	2015 Singapore	400m freestyle S8
Gold medal – first place	2017 Kuala Lumpur	200m individual medley SM8
Gold medal – first place	2017 Kuala Lumpur	400m freestyle S8
Gold medal – first place	2022 Surakarta	200m individual medley SM7
Gold medal – first place	2022 Surakarta	400m freestyle S7 TF
Gold medal – first place	2025 Nakhon Ratchasima	200m freestyle S7
Gold medal – first place	2025 Nakhon Ratchasima	400m freestyle S7
Silver medal – second place	2015 Singapore	100m freestyle S8
Silver medal – second place	2017 Kuala Lumpur	100m butterfly S8
Silver medal – second place	2022 Surakarta	100m backstroke S7
Silver medal – second place	2025 Nakhon Ratchasima	100m freestyle S7
Bronze medal – third place	2017 Kuala Lumpur	4×100m freestyle relay 34 pts
Bronze medal – third place	2017 Kuala Lumpur	4×100m medley relay 34 pts
Bronze medal – third place	2022 Surakarta	4×100m freestyle relay
Bronze medal – third place	2025 Nakhon Ratchasima	200m individual medley SM7-SM8
Bronze medal – third place	2025 Nakhon Ratchasima	50m butterfly S7

Ernie Agat Gawilan (born May 5, 1991) is a Filipino swimmer who competed at the 2016 and 2020 Summer Paralympics and was the first gold medalist for the Philippines in the Asian Para Games.

== Early life ==
Gawilan was born in the Paquibato district of Davao City with underdeveloped extremities resulting to him lacking both legs and an underdeveloped left limb due to surviving an attempted abortion and poor pre-natal healthcare in the Marilog District of Davao City. He was orphaned at the young age after his father left him. His mother died of cholera when he was still five months old and his father left Ernie and his mother after the patriarch discovered his mother's infidelity. His grandfather took custody of him until when Ernie Gawilan met businessman Vicente Ferrazzini when he was nine years old. Ferrazzini convinced Gawilan's grandfather to send him to Davao City proper in a training center for the handicapped.

In the city, he reside at the Our Lady of Victory Training Center with other handicapped youth under the custody of the Maryknoll sisters of St. Dominic. Gawilan was taken care of by Cecilia Wood, a nun who served as director at the center from 1989 to 2010. Gawilan studied Holy Cross of Sasa for his high school studies and finished at least his second year studies on May 5, 1991.

Ernie Gawilan was brought to Samal Island in 2000 where he worked as a housekeeper of another training center operated by nuns. It was at this place that Gawilan took up swimming.

== Career ==
Gawilan was scouted by swimming coach Mark Jude Corpuz when Corpuz saw him struggling to swim. Corpuz made Gawilan part of a persons with disability (PWD) swimming team he was handling and the Forest Hills resort pool became a place for Gawilan to train. Gawilan's first swimming competition was the 2008 Philippine Olympic Festival which was held in Cagayan de Oro, he was almost disqualified after competition officials learned that he forgot his swimming trunks but was allowed to compete wearing bulky cargo pants. Gawilan finished second in the competition which included members of PWD national team. The first placer, a native of Iligan and PWD national team member urged him to go to Manila and Gawilan became a member of the national team himself.

He has joined numerous tournaments in India, Indonesia, Italy, Japan, Malaysia, Myanmar, New Zealand, and Singapore and has won at least 15 international medals by November 2014. Initially competed under the S8 classification, Gawilan later competed under the S7 classification after a change in regulations by the International Paralympic Committee.

He trains under National Para Swimming Team Coaches Tony Ong and Ral Rosario.

=== Summer Paralympics ===
At the 2016 Summer Paralympics, Gawilan competed at the 400-meter freestyle, 100-meter freestyle and 100-meter backstroke events.

Gawilan is set to return at the 2020 Summer Paralympics after he attained the minimum qualifying time for the 400m freestyle S6 event. Gawilan formalized his qualification to the Olympics when he took part in a review classification race in the 2021 World Para Swimming World Series in Berlin which was held on June 18, 2021.

=== Asian Para Games ===
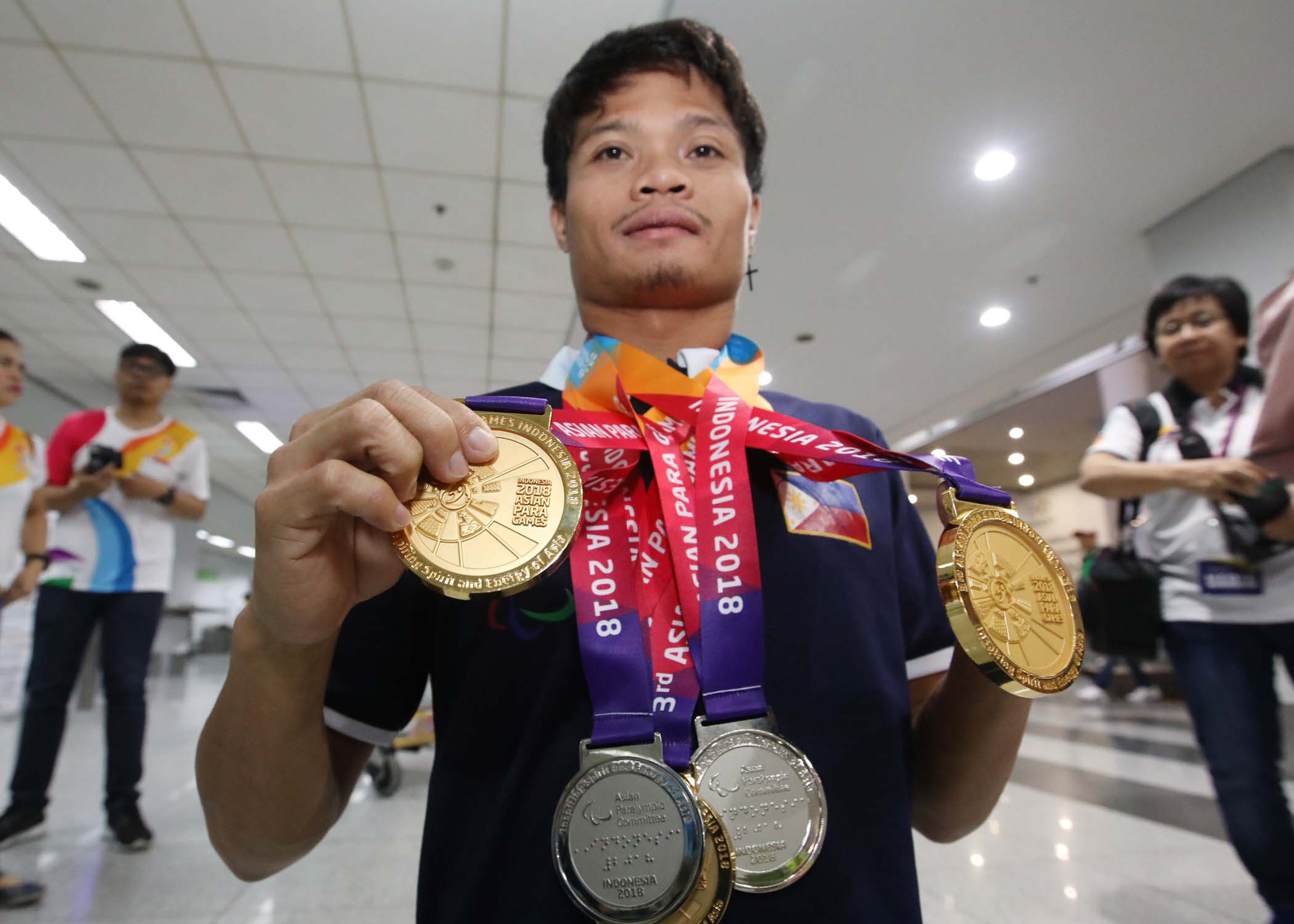
Gawilan with his medals which he won at the 2018 Asian Para Games.

Ernie Gawilan has competed in the Asian Para Games. At the 2014 Asian Para Games in Incheon, South Korea, he won three bronze medals, the most among the Philippine delegation. In the 2018 edition hosted Jakarta, Indonesia, Gawilan won the Philippines' first ever gold medal in the history of the games in the men's 200 meter individual medley SM7. He also won a silver in the 50 meter freestyle S7 event in the same edition.

On October 24, 2023, Gawilan won a gold medal at the 2022 Asian Para Games in Hangzhou in the men's 400m freestyle-S7 event ahead of Toh Wei Soong. On February 21, 2024, Gawilan and Angel Atom "secured slots for the 2024 Summer Paralympics, through the Minimum Qualifying Standard" said the Philippine Sports Commission.

=== ASEAN Para Games ===
At the 2015 ASEAN Para Games in Singapore, Gawilan satisfied the Olympic qualifying time of 4:48.29 after he won a gold medal at the men's 400-meter freestyle S8 event with the time of 4:48.49. The feat qualified him for the 2016 Summer Paralympics to be held in Rio de Janeiro. The result was also an ASEAN Para Games recording beating the former record result of 5:03.09, as well as Gawilan's previous personal best of 4:53.67. The performance was followed by another gold at the men's 200 individual medley event. Before winning a gold medal at the games, Gawilan clinched the silver medal at the men's 100m freestyle event.

At the 2025 ASEAN Para Games in Thailand in January 2026, Gawilan won a gold medal at the men's 200-meter freestyle S7 event, setting up a new games record of 2:26.08. This surpassed the time set by Thai swimmer Sittichai Somyut at the 2008 ASEAN Para Games.
