= Toh Wei Soong =

Singaporean Paralympic swimmer

Toh Wei Soong PLY
Personal information
- Born: 11 September 1998 (age 28) Singapore
- Height: 1.77 m (5 ft 10 in)
- Weight: 68 kg (150 lb)

Sport
- Sport: Swimming
- Strokes: Freestyle, Butterfly
- Classifications: S7, S8
Medal record
Men's para swimming
Representing Singapore
| Event | 1st | 2nd | 3rd |
|---|---|---|---|
| Asian Para Games | 5 | 3 | 4 |
| Commonwealth Games | 0 | 2 | 1 |
| ASEAN Para Games | 11 | 5 | 1 |
| Asian Youth Para Games | 0 | 1 | 0 |
| Pan Pacific Para Swimming Championships | 0 | 1 | 0 |
| Total | 16 | 12 | 6 |
Asian Para Games
| Gold medal – first place | 2018 Jakarta | 50 m freestyle S7 |
| Gold medal – first place | 2018 Jakarta | 100 m freestyle S7 |
| Gold medal – first place | 2022 Hangzhou | 50 m freestyle S7 |
| Gold medal – first place | 2022 Hangzhou | 50 m butterfly S7 |
| Gold medal – first place | 2022 Hangzhou | 100 m backstroke S7 |
| Silver medal – second place | 2022 Hangzhou | 400 m freestyle S7 |
| Silver medal – second place | 2026 Aichi–Nagoya | 50 m freestyle S7 |
| Silver medal – second place | 2026 Aichi–Nagoya | 100 m backstroke S7 |
| Bronze medal – third place | 2018 Jakarta | 100 m backstroke S7 |
| Bronze medal – third place | 2026 Aichi–Nagoya | 50 m butterfly S7 |
| Bronze medal – third place | 2026 Aichi–Nagoya | 100 m freestyle S7 |
| Bronze medal – third place | 2026 Aichi–Nagoya | 400 m freestyle S7 |
Commonwealth Games
| Silver medal – second place | 2022 Birmingham | 50 m freestyle S7 |
| Silver medal – second place | 2026 Glasgow | 50 m freestyle S7 |
| Bronze medal – third place | 2018 Gold Coast | 50 m freestyle S7 |
ASEAN Para Games
| Gold medal – first place | 2015 Singapore | 50 m freestyle S8 |
| Gold medal – first place | 2015 Singapore | 100 m freestyle S8 |
| Gold medal – first place | 2015 Singapore | 100m backstroke S8 |
| Gold medal – first place | 2017 Kuala Lumpur | 50 m freestyle S7 |
| Gold medal – first place | 2017 Kuala Lumpur | 100 m freestyle S7 |
| Gold medal – first place | 2023 Phnom Penh | 50 m freestyle S7 |
| Gold medal – first place | 2023 Phnom Penh | 100 m freestyle S7 |
| Gold medal – first place | 2023 Phnom Penh | 50 m butterfly S7 |
| Gold medal – first place | 2025 Nakhon Ratchasima | 50 m freestyle S7 |
| Gold medal – first place | 2025 Nakhon Ratchasima | 100 m freestyle S7 |
| Gold medal – first place | 2025 Nakhon Ratchasima | 50 m butterfly S7 |
| Silver medal – second place | 2015 Singapore | 400 m freestyle S8 |
| Silver medal – second place | 2017 Kuala Lumpur | 100 m backstroke S7 |
| Silver medal – second place | 2023 Phnom Penh | 400 m freestyle S7 |
| Silver medal – second place | 2023 Phnom Penh | 100 m backstroke S7 |
| Silver medal – second place | 2025 Nakhon Ratchasima | 400 m freestyle S7 |
| Bronze medal – third place | 2025 Nakhon Ratchasima | 100 m backstroke S7-S8 |
Asian Youth Para Games
| Silver medal – second place | 2013 Kuala Lumpur | 100 m freestyle S8 |
Pan Pacific Para Swimming Championships
| Silver medal – second place | 2018 Cairns | 100 m freestyle S7 |

Toh Wei Soong PLY (Chinese: 杜维崧; pinyin: Dù Wéisōng; born 11 September 1998) is a Singaporean freestyle and butterfly swimmer. He is a two-time Paralympian and one of the most decorated Singaporean athletes with 5 gold medals at the Asian Para Games and 11 gold medals at the ASEAN Para Games.

He won the first-ever para sports medal for Singapore at the 2018 Commonwealth Games with a bronze medal in the S7 50 metre Freestyle and currently holds the highest number of medals won by a Singapore swimmer at the Commonwealth Games with 2 silvers and 1 bronze.

At the 2020 Summer Olympics, Toh finished fourth place in the S7 50 metre Butterfly final and missed the bronze medal by 0.16 seconds, marking his best career performance at a Paralympic event.

== Early life and education ==
At the age of 2, Toh was affected by Transverse myelitis, a condition caused by the inflammation of the spinal cord that has affected his lower nervous system. The eldest of two children in his family, Toh studied at Anglo-Chinese School (Junior) and Anglo-Chinese School (Independent), graduating from the International Baccalaureate (IB) programme in 2017.

In 2019, Toh studied Philosophy, Politics and Economics (PPE) at the National University of Singapore (NUS) under the University Scholars Programme. He graduated with a Bachelor of Arts (Honours) in Philosophy, Politics, and Economics in 2024. As an undergraduate, he was also a recipient of the Asia Pacific Breweries (APB) Foundation Scholarship for Persons with Disabilities.

== Swimming career ==
Toh started swimming competitively at the age of 14. He won the first-ever Special Event at the annual SSSC Championships, competing as a para-swimmer for Anglo-Chinese School (Independent). In 2013, he joined Aquatic Performance Swim Club under the Singapore National Para-Swimming Team and met his current coach, Ang Peng Siong, a former Singaporean Olympic swimmer.

=== 2013 Asian Youth Para Games ===
At the 2013 Asian Youth Para Games, held in Kuala Lumpur, Malaysia, Toh won a silver medal in the Men's 100-metre freestyle S8 event, his first medal in an international event.

=== 2014 Asian Para Games ===
At the 2014 Asian Para Games held in Incheon, South Korea, Toh competed for Singapore at the 2018 Asian Para Games in the S8 100M Freestyle, also serving as pledge taker for the Singapore contingent at the Games.

=== 2015 ASEAN Para Games ===
At the 2015 ASEAN Para Games held in Singapore, Toh rose to prominence by winning three gold medals and one silver medal from his 4 events. He was also a torchbearer alongside other Singaporean athletes such as Yip Pin Xiu and Tay Wei Ming

=== 2017 ASEAN Para Games ===
At the 2017 ASEAN Para Games held in Kuala Lumpur, Malaysia, Toh won two gold medals and one silver medal from his 3 events, breaking several Games records for his events.

=== 2018 Commonwealth Games ===
At the 2018 Commonwealth Games held on the Gold Coast, Australia, Toh won the first para-swimming medal for Singapore in the Men's 50-metre freestyle S7 event, obtaining a bronze medal. He is also the second person to win a swimming medal for Singapore at the Commonwealth Games, following up on Joseph Schooling's silver medal at the 2014 Commonwealth Games in Glasgow, UK.

=== 2018 Asian Para Games ===
At the 2018 Asian Para Games held in Jakarta, Indonesia, Toh won the first medal for Singapore at the 2018 Asian Para Games, obtaining a gold medal in the Men's 50-metre freestyle S7 event on the first day of competition, beating competitors Daisuke Ejima from Japan and Ernie Gawilan from the Philippines. He won another gold medal in the Men's 100-metre freestyle S7 event and a bronze medal in the Men's 100-metre backstroke S7 event, becoming the most decorated Singaporean athlete of the Games.

=== 2020 Summer Paralympics ===
At the 2020 Summer Paralympics held in Tokyo, Japan, Toh finished fourth place in the Men's S7 50-metre Butterfly final, missing out on a bronze medal by 0.16 seconds. He also swam in the Men's S7 50-metre Freestyle and 400-metre Freestyle finals, finishing seventh in both events.

=== 2022 Commonwealth Games ===
At the 2022 Commonwealth Games held in Birmingham, England, Toh won a silver medal for Singapore in the Men's S7 50-metre freestyle, becoming the most decorated Singapore swimmer overall at the Commonwealth Games with one silver and one bronze medal.

=== 2023 ASEAN Para Games ===
At the 2023 ASEAN Para Games held in Phnom Penh, Cambodia, Toh won three gold medals and two silver medals for Singapore over 5 events, setting new Games Records in the S7 Men's 50-metre butterfly and S7 Men's 100-metre freestyle respectively, with a new National Record set in the S7 Men's 100-metre backstroke.

=== 2022 Asian Para Games ===
At the 2022 Asian Para Games held in Hangzhou, China, Toh won three gold medals and one silver medal for Singapore over 4 events, becoming the most decorated Singaporean athlete at the 2022 Asian Para Games. Toh was also the first medallist for Singapore at the Games with his silver medal in the Men's S7 400-metre Freestyle event. He later won three gold medals in the Men's S7 100-metre Backstroke, the Men's S7 50-metre Butterfly and the Men's S7 50-metre Freestyle events, respectively.

=== 2024 Summer Paralympics ===
At the 2024 Summer Paralympics held in Paris, France, Toh finished eighth in both the Men's S7 50-metre freestyle final and the Men's S7 50-metre butterfly final. He also swam in the Men's S7 100-metre backstroke, finishing ninth place in the heats.

=== 2025 ASEAN Para Games ===
At the 2025 ASEAN Para Games held in Nakhon Ratchasima, Thailand, Toh won three gold medals, one silver medal and one bronze medal for Singapore over 5 events, earning him the third golden hat-trick of his career at the ASEAN Para Games.

=== 2026 Commonwealth Games ===
At the 2026 Commonwealth Games held in Glasgow, Scotland, Toh won a silver medal for Singapore in the Men's S7 50-metre freestyle, adding to his record as the most decorated Singapore swimmer overall at the Commonwealth Games with two silvers and one bronze medal.

=== 2026 Asian Para Games ===
At the 2026 Asian Para Games held in Aichi-Nagoya, Japan, Toh won two silver medals and three bronze medals for Singapore over 5 events. Toh was also the first medallist for Singapore at the Games with his bronze medal in the Men's S7 400-metre Freestyle event.

== Honours and awards ==
Since 2013, Toh has competed at 14 major games, including 2 Paralympic Games, 4 Asian Para Games, 3 Commonwealth Games, 4 ASEAN Para Games and 1 Asian Youth Para Games.

As Vice-Chairman of the Singapore Para Athletes Commission, he sits on the board of directors for the Singapore National Paralympic Council (SNPC) and the Singapore Disability Sports Council (SDSC).

He has also received the following awards:

- Singapore Disability Sports Award, Sportsman of the Year: 2022, 2023, 2024, 2025
- Singapore Disability Sports Award, Sportsboy of the Year: 2019, 2020, 2021
- Goh Chok Tong Enable Awards (GCTEA), Achievement Award: 2025
- Goh Chok Tong Enable Awards (GCTEA), Promise Award: 2019
- The Straits Times' Athlete of the Year, Nomination: 2019
