= Dương Thị Lan =

Vietnamese Paralympic swimmer (born 1988)

Medal record

Swimming

Representing Vietnam

ASEAN Para Games
Bronze medal – third place	2017 Malaysia	Women's 100m backstroke - SB6

Dương Thị Lan (born 2 September 1988) is a Vietnamese Paralympic swimmer.

At the 2012 Summer Paralympics in London she competed in the 100m SB5.
