= Swimming at the 2015 ASEAN Para Games =

- Venue: OCBC Aquatic Centre
- Date: 4–9 December 2015

Paralympic swimming at the 2015 ASEAN Para Games was held at OCBC Aquatic Centre, Singapore.

== Medal table ==
* Host nation (Singapore)

Rank	Nation	Gold	Silver	Bronze	Total
1	Vietnam (VIE)	19	22	21	62
2	Indonesia (INA)	17	17	16	50
3	Singapore (SIN)*	16	6	11	33
4	Thailand (THA)	15	19	22	56
5	Myanmar (MYA)	9	7	7	23
6	Malaysia (MAS)	7	13	4	24
7	Philippines (PHI)	3	2	1	6
8	Cambodia (CAM)	0	0	1	1
Totals (8 entries)		86	86	83	255

== Medalists ==
=== Men ===
Event	Gold	Silver	Bronze
200 m freestyle S4	Somchai Doungkaew; Thailand	Ha Van Hiep; Vietnam	-
100 m breaststroke SB4	Nguyen Thanh Trung; Vietnam	Voravit Kaewkham; Thailand	Ye Tun; Myanmar
50 m freestyle S5	Vo Thanh Tung; Vietnam	Jamery Anak Siga; Malaysia	Danh Hoa; Vietnam
100 m freestyle S5	Vo Thanh Tung; Vietnam	Jamery Anak Siga; Malaysia	Voravit Kaewkham; Thailand
200 m freestyle S5	Jamery Anak Siga; Malaysia	Vo Thanh Tung; Vietnam	Voravit Kaewkham; Thailand
50 m backstroke S5	Vo Thanh Tung; Vietnam	Zul Amirul Sidi bin Abdullah; Malaysia	Nguyen Thanh Trung; Vietnam
50 m butterfly S5	Jamery Anak Siga; Malaysia	Vo Thanh Tung; Vietnam	Voravit Kaewkham; Thailand
100 m breaststroke SB5	Do Thanh Hai; Vietnam	Ly Huynh; Vietnam	Taweesook Samuksaneeto; Thailand
50 m freestyle S6	Aung Myint Myat; Myanmar	Agus Ngaimin; Indonesia	Naing Sit Aung; Myanmar
100 m freestyle S6	Agus Ngaimin; Indonesia	Aung Myint Myat; Myanmar	Do Thanh Hai; Vietnam
400 m freestyle S6	Aung Myint Myat; Myanmar	Agus Ngaimin; Indonesia	Fajar Nur Hadianto; Indonesia
100 m backstroke S6	Agus Ngaimin; Indonesia	Aung Myint Myat; Myanmar	Naing Sit Aung; Myanmar
50 m butterfly S6	Naing Sit Aung; Myanmar	Aung Myint Myat; Myanmar	Boonyarit Payungsakul; Thailand
100 m breaststroke SB6	Le Tien Dat; Vietnam	Yongyoot Tabthong; Thailand	Suriansyah; Indonesia
200 m individual medley SM6	Naing Sit Aung; Myanmar	Aung Myint Myat; Myanmar	Do Thanh Hai; Vietnam
50 m freestyle S7	Le Tien Dat; Vietnam	Kaweewat Sittichaiphonniti; Thailand	Channi Wongnonthaphum; Thailand
100 m freestyle S7	Kaweewat Sittichaiphonniti; Thailand	Suriansyah; Indonesia	Channi Wongnonthaphum; Thailand
400 m freestyle S7	Gary Adornado Bejino; Philippines	Kaweewat Sittichaiphonniti; Thailand	Suriansyah; Indonesia
100 m backstroke S7	Suriansyah; Indonesia	Channi Wongnonthaphum; Thailand	Nguyen Duc Thien; Vietnam
100 m breaststroke SB7	Aung Nyein Oo; Myanmar	Tin Myo; Myanmar	Aris Wibawa; Indonesia
50 m freestyle S8	Toh Wei Soong; Singapore	Guntur; Indonesia	Nget Bo; Cambodia
100 m freestyle S8	Toh Wei Soong; Singapore	Ernie Agat Gawilan; Philippines	Guntur; Indonesia
400 m freestyle S8	Ernie Agat Gawilan; Philippines	Toh Wei Soong; Singapore	Dang Van Cong; Vietnam
100 m backstroke S8	Toh Wei Soong; Singapore	Dang Van Cong; Vietnam	Paibun Wongnonthaphum; Thailand
100 m butterfly S8	Guntur; Indonesia	James Wong Tien Yu; Malaysia	Thanisorn Jitnarin; Thailand
100 m breaststroke SB8	Guntur; Indonesia	Nguyen Quang Vuong; Vietnam	Jendi Pangabean; Indonesia
200 m individual medley SM8	Ernie Agat Gawilan; Philippines	Guntur; Indonesia	James Wong Tien Yu; Malaysia
50 m freestyle S9	Vo Huynh Anh Khoa; Vietnam	Nguyen Hoang Nha; Vietnam	Ahmad Azwari; Indonesia
100 m freestyle S9	Vo Huynh Anh Khoa; Vietnam	Roland Bajo Sabido; Philippines	Ahmad Azwari; Indonesia
400 m freestyle S9	Vo Huynh Anh Khoa; Vietnam	Jendi Pangabean; Indonesia	Roland Bajo Sabido; Philippines
100 m backstroke S9	Jendi Pangabean; Indonesia	Vo Huynh Anh Khoa; Vietnam	Nguyen Hoang Nha; Vietnam
100 m butterfly S9	Vo Huynh Anh Khoa; Vietnam	Jendi Pangabean; Indonesia	Nguyen Ngoc Thiet; Vietnam
100 m breaststroke SB9	Aung Phone; Myanmar	Jumri; Indonesia	Budiman Setiawan Yowei; Indonesia
200 m individual medley SM9	Jendi Pangabean; Indonesia	Vo Huynh Anh Khoa; Vietnam	Nguyen Ngoc Thiet; Vietnam
50 m freestyle S10	Musa Mandan Karubaba; Indonesia	Aung Phone; Myanmar	Tangkilisan Steven Sualang; Indonesia
100 m freestyle S10	Musa Mandan Karubaba; Indonesia	Aung Phone; Myanmar	Suphat Punsiri; Thailand
400 m freestyle S10	Fraidden Dawan; Malaysia	Tangkilisan Steven Sualang; Indonesia	Suphat Punsiri; Thailand
100 m backstroke S10	Tangkilisan Steven Sualang; Indonesia	Fraidden Dawan; Malaysia	Phyo Ko Ko; Myanmar
100 m butterfly S10	Musa Mandan Karubaba; Indonesia	Fraidden Dawan; Malaysia	Tangkilisan Steven Sualang; Indonesia
200 m individual medley SM10	Fraidden Dawan; Malaysia	Musa Mandan Karubaba; Indonesia	Aung Phone; Myanmar
50 m freestyle S11	Pham Anh Tu; Vietnam	Panom Lagsanaprim; Thailand	Thanongsak Hitakun; Thailand
100 m freestyle S11	Pham Anh Tu; Vietnam	Thanongsak Hitakun; Thailand	Iberamsyah; Indonesia
400 m freestyle S11	Pham Anh Tu; Vietnam	Iberamsyah; Indonesia	Kittiporn Marnnok; Thailand
100 m backstroke S11	Thanongsak Hitakun; Thailand	Kritaphat Witidkasemrot; Thailand	I Ketut Sumita; Indonesia
100 m butterfly S11	Kittiporn Marnnok; Thailand	Iberamsyah; Indonesia	Sunarto; Indonesia
100 m breaststroke SB11	Panom Lagsanaprim; Thailand	Kritaphat Witidkasemrot; Thailand	Pham Anh Tu; Vietnam
200 m individual medley SM11	Panom Lagsanaprim; Thailand	Kritaphat Witidkasemrot; Thailand	Iberamsyah; Indonesia
50 m freestyle S12	Tran Quoc Phi; Vietnam	Menaser Meriba Numberi; Indonesia	Wong Meng Ee; Singapore
100 m freestyle S12	Tran Quoc Phi; Vietnam	Menaser Meriba Numberi; Indonesia	Wong Meng Ee; Singapore
50 m freestyle S13	Marinus Melianus Yowei; Indonesia	Sutat Sawattarn; Thailand	Chaiporn Laobeng; Thailand
100 m freestyle S13	Marinus Melianus Yowei; Indonesia	Sutat Sawattarn; Thailand	Julius Anak Jaranding; Malaysia
100 m breaststroke SB13	Marinus Melianus Yowei; Indonesia	Julius Anak Jaranding; Malaysia	Chaiporn Laobeng; Thailand
50 m freestyle S14	Tan Eng Kiong Benson; Singapore	Yoong Chung Wei; Malaysia	Han Liang Chou; Singapore
100 m freestyle S14	Tan Eng Kiong Benson; Singapore	Yoong Chung Wei; Malaysia	Han Liang Chou; Singapore
200 m freestyle S14	Tan Eng Kiong Benson; Singapore	Yoong Chung Wei; Malaysia	Han Liang Chou; Singapore
50 m backstroke S14	Tay Wei Siang Lawrence; Singapore	Han Liang Chou; Singapore	Ting Jin Ping; Malaysia
100 m backstroke S14	Tan Eng Kiong Benson; Singapore	Yoong Chung Wei; Malaysia	Tay Wei Siang Lawrence; Singapore
50 m butterfly S14	Yoong Chung Wei; Malaysia	Tan Eng Kiong Benson; Singapore	Han Liang Chou; Singapore
50 m breaststroke SB14	Han Liang Chou; Singapore	Yoong Chung Wei; Malaysia	Tay Wei Siang Lawrence; Singapore
100 m breaststroke SB14	Han Liang Chou; Singapore	Yoong Chung Wei; Malaysia	Tay Wei Siang Lawrence; Singapore
200 m individual medley SM14	Yoong Chung Wei; Malaysia	Tay Wei Siang Lawrence; Singapore	Han Liang Chou; Singapore
4×50 m medley relay 20 points	Vietnam (VIE); Vo Thanh Tung; Nguyen Thanh Trung; Do Thanh Hai; Danh Hoa	Thailand (THA); Somchai Doungkaew; Voravit Kaewkham; Taweesook Samuksaneeto; Prajim Reangsantie	-
4 × 100 m freestyle relay 34 points	Indonesia (INA); Agus Ngaimin; Jendi Pangabean; Ahmad Azwari; Musa Mandan Karubaba	Vietnam (VIE); Le Tien Dat; Pham Thanh Son; Nguyen Hoang Nha; Nguyen Ngoc Thiet	Thailand (THA); Kaweewat Sittichaiphonniti; Paibun Wongnonthaphum; Anurak Srinarong; Suphat Punsiri
4 × 100 m medley relay 34 points	Myanmar (MYA); Aung Myint Myat; Aung Phone; Phyo Ko Ko; Myo Myat Kyaw	Vietnam (VIE); Dang Van Cong; Nguyen Quang Vuong; Vo Huynh Anh Khoa; Nguyen Hoang Nha	-

=== Women ===
Event	Gold	Silver	Bronze
100 m breaststroke SB4	Goh Rui Si Theresa; Singapore	Danh Thi My Thanh; Vietnam	Pornpimon Sutthichittanon; Thailand
50 m freestyle S5	Goh Rui Si Theresa; Singapore	Yip Pin Xiu; Singapore	Nguyen Thi Den; Vietnam
100 m freestyle S5	Goh Rui Si Theresa; Singapore	Yip Pin Xiu; Singapore	Danh Thi My Thanh; Vietnam
200 m freestyle S5	Goh Rui Si Theresa; Singapore	Nguyen Thi Den; Vietnam	Danh Thi My Thanh; Vietnam
50 m backstroke S5	Yip Pin Xiu; Singapore	Nguyen Thi Den; Vietnam	Goh Rui Si Theresa; Singapore
50 m butterfly S5	Goh Rui Si Theresa; Singapore	Danh Thi My Thanh; Vietnam	Pornpimon Sutthichittanon; Thailand
50 m freestyle S6	Trinh Thi Bich Nhu; Vietnam	Nguyen Thi Sa Ri; Vietnam	Aw May San; Myanmar
100 m breaststroke SB6	Trinh Thi Bich Nhu; Vietnam	Vi Thi Hang; Vietnam	Du Thi Lan; Vietnam
100 m breaststroke SB7	May Htoo Mon; Myanmar	Gusmalayanti; Indonesia	Thongbai Chaisawas; Thailand
50 m freestyle S8	Lim Carmen; Malaysia	Vi Thi Hang; Vietnam	Thongbai Chaisawas; Thailand
100 m freestyle S8	Thongbai Chaisawas; Thailand	Vi Thi Hang; Vietnam	Trinh Thi Bich Nhu; Vietnam
100 m backstroke S8	Jeerawan Naithong; Thailand	Gusmalayanti; Indonesia	Wilasini Wongnonthapoom; Thailand
100 m breaststroke SB8	Thin Thin Khaing; Myanmar	Huynh Thi Kim Hoang; Vietnam	Lim Carmen; Malaysia
50 m freestyle S9	Anchaya Ketkeaw; Thailand	Surerut Komkeaw; Thailand	Le Thi Dung; Vietnam
100 m freestyle S9	Anchaya Ketkeaw; Thailand	Surerut Komkeaw; Thailand	Le Thi Dung; Vietnam
400 m freestyle S9	Anchaya Ketkeaw; Thailand	Surerut Komkeaw; Thailand	Le Thi Dung; Vietnam
100 m backstroke S9	Anchaya Ketkeaw; Thailand	Piyanuch Buapun; Thailand	Surerut Komkeaw; Thailand
100 m butterfly S9	Anchaya Ketkeaw; Thailand	Surerut Komkeaw; Thailand	Le Thi Dung; Vietnam
100 m breaststroke SB9	Anchaya Ketkeaw; Thailand	Sapia Rumbaru; Indonesia	Le Thi Tram; Vietnam
200 m individual medley SM9	Anchaya Ketkeaw; Thailand	Piyanuch Buapun; Thailand	Le Thi Dung; Vietnam
50 m freestyle S10	Sapia Rumbaru; Indonesia	Le Thi Tram; Vietnam	Zin Mar Htun; Myanmar
100 m butterfly S10	Sapia Rumbaru; Indonesia	Nguyen Thi Thuy; Vietnam	Rusdiana; Indonesia
