= CP football at the 2017 ASEAN Para Games =

Football 7-a-side at the 2017 ASEAN Para Games
- Football 7-a-side logo

Tournament details
- Host country: Malaysia
- Dates: 18 – 23 September 2017
- Teams: 6
- Venue: 1 (in 1 host city)

Final positions
- Champions: Indonesia (1st title)
- Runners-up: Thailand
- Third place: Malaysia
- Fourth place: Singapore

Tournament statistics
- Matches played: 11
- Goals scored: 72 (6.55 per match)

7-a-side football at the 2017 ASEAN Para Games will be held from 18 to 22 September 2017 at Field C in Bukit Jalil National sports complex, Kuala Lumpur. There was 1 gold medal in this sport.

== Participating teams ==
- Cambodia
- Indonesia
- Malaysia (hosts)
- Myanmar
- Singapore
- Thailand

== Venues ==
The venues to be used for all matches were located in National Sports Complex, KL Sports City.

Kuala Lumpur	2017 ASEAN Para Games football 7-a-side venue
Stadium: Field C	2017 ASEAN Para Games football 7-a-side venue
Capacity: N/A	2017 ASEAN Para Games football 7-a-side venue

== Group stage ==
The first round, or group stage, have seen the sixteen teams divided into two groups of three teams.

=== Group A ===
In the first group stage have seen the teams in a one group of five teams.

Pos	Team	Pld	W	D	L	GF	GA	GD	Pts	Qualified for
1	Indonesia	2	2	0	0	12	3	+9	6	Team play for position 1
2	Thailand	2	1	0	1	2	2	0	3	Team play for position 1
3	Myanmar	2	0	0	2	2	11	−9	0	Team play for the position 5

Source: The results of the table were determined from the results
Rules for classification: Tie-breaking criteria
18 September
8:45

Thailand	1–0	Myanmar
Wanna Nattapong 60+1'	Report

KL Sports City, Kuala Lumpur
Referee: Nathan Chan Singapore
19 September
8:15

Indonesia	2–1	Thailand
Adi Joko Saputra 32'; Yahya Hernanda 46'	Report	Wanna Nattapong 6'; Siwadol Srisuwun (yellow card) 60+1'

KL Sports City, Kuala Lumpur
Referee: Hee Chun Keet, Malaysia
20 September
8:15

Myanmar	2–10	Indonesia
Wai Yan Min Tun 25', 48'	Report	Yahya Muhaimi 11', 15', 23'; Yuliarsi Ahmad 14'; Yahya Hernanda 19', 42', 48'

KL Sports City, Kuala Lumpur
Referee: Park Kyun Yong South Korea

=== Group B ===
Pos	Team	Pld	W	D	L	GF	GA	GD	Pts	Qualified for
1	Malaysia	2	2	0	0	17	3	+14	6	Team play for position 1
2	Singapore	2	1	0	1	7	5	+2	3	Team play for position 1
3	Cambodia	2	0	0	2	0	16	−16	0	Team play for the position 5

Source: The results of the table were determined from the results
Rules for classification: Tie-breaking criteria
18 September
8:15

Malaysia	5–3	Singapore
	Report

KL Sports City, Kuala Lumpur
19 September
8:45

Cambodia	0–12	Malaysia
	Report

KL Sports City, Kuala Lumpur
20 September
8:45

Singapore	4–0	Cambodia
	Report

KL Sports City, Kuala Lumpur

== Knockout stage ==
=== Bracket ===
Semi-finals
26 August – Kuala Lumpur
Indonesia	6
Singapore	0
26 August – Kuala Lumpur
Malaysia	2
Thailand	3

Gold medal match
29 August – Kuala Lumpur
Indonesia	3
Thailand	0
Bronze medal match
29 August – Kuala Lumpur
Malaysia	4
Singapore	0

Position 5-6
21 September – Kuala Lumpur
Myanmar	14
Cambodia	0

=== Semi-finals ===
21 September
8:30

Indonesia	6–0	Singapore
	Report

KL Sports City, Kuala Lumpur
21 September
8:30

Malaysia	2–3 (a.e.t.)	Thailand
	Report

KL Sports City, Kuala Lumpur

=== Position 5-6 ===
21 September 2017
16:30

Myanmar	14–0	Cambodia
	Report

KL Sports City, Kuala Lumpur

=== Bronze medal match ===
22 September 2017
15:30

Singapore	0–4	Malaysia
	Report

KL Sports City, Kuala Lumpur

=== Gold medal match ===
22 September 2017
17:15

Indonesia	3–0	Thailand
	Report

KL Sports City, Kuala Lumpur

== Statistics ==
=== Ranking ===
Rank	Team
Gold medal	Indonesia
Silver medal	Thailand
Bronze medal	Malaysia
4.	Singapore
5.	Myanmar
6.	Cambodia

=== Medalists ===
Event	Gold	Silver	Bronze
Men	Indonesia (INA); Amin Rosyid; Sobirin; Adi Joko Saputra; Ammar Hudzaifah; Dany Priyo Sejati; Cahyana; Ahmad Yuliarsi; Hermannudin; Habib Shaleh; Yahya Hernanda; Tryagus Arief Rachman; Yahya Muhaimi	Thailand (THA); Jettarin Wonghangmit; Nattapong Wanna; Sanya Suksang; Siwadol Srisuwun; Chaloemchai Wisetrat; Paisan Saechao; Chanchai Kaemkaew; Anuchit Tata; Chakkri Intathong; Wisan Tami; Narongchai Thaohong; Aphinan Panpim; Detchai Doisamran; Nattapong Glaharn	Malaysia (MAS); Mohd Syafiq Zahari; Muhammad Zul Asyraaf Zulkifli; Ahmad Azizan Aziz; Amirul Mian; Muhammad Farissan Jasnal; Noor Muhammad Ariff Yusoff; Muhammad Uthman Surur; Mohamad Sobri Ghazali; Muhammad Khairi Ismail; Mohammad Razif Paiman; Zuhairisam Ahmad; Mohamad Suffian Shariff; Syahrul Feezwan Abdul Samat

== See also ==
- Football at the 2017 Southeast Asian Games
