= Swimming at the 2017 ASEAN Para Games =

- Venue: National Aquatic Centre
- Date: 18–22 September 2017

Paralympic swimming at the 2017 ASEAN Para Games was held at the National Aquatic Centre, Kuala Lumpur from 18 to 22 September 2017.

== Medal summary ==
* Host nation (Malaysia)

Rank	Nation	Gold	Silver	Bronze	Total
1	Indonesia (INA)	39	13	12	64
2	Vietnam (VIE)	15	22	16	53
3	Malaysia (MAS)*	9	17	10	36
4	Thailand (THA)	7	11	22	40
5	Myanmar (MYA)	7	7	6	20
6	Singapore (SGP)	4	7	3	14
7	Philippines (PHI)	3	3	5	11
8	Laos (LAO)	0	1	2	3
9	Cambodia (CAM)	0	1	1	2
Totals (9 entries)		84	82	77	243

== Medalists ==
=== Men ===
Event	Class	Gold	Silver	Bronze
50 m freestyle	S4	Kiadtisak Suwannasri; Thailand	none awarded	none awarded
50 m backstroke	S4	Anderson Jamba; Malaysia	Charkorn Kaewsri; Thailand	Hà Văn Hiệp; Vietnam
50 m breaststroke	SB3	Hà Văn Hiệp; Vietnam	Anderson Jamba; Malaysia	Charkorn Kaewsri; Thailand
150 m individual medley	SM4	Anderson Jamba; Malaysia	none awarded	none awarded
50 m freestyle	S5	Võ Thanh Tùng; Vietnam	Muhammad Nur Syaiful Zulkafli; Malaysia	Mulyadi; Indonesia
200 m freestyle	S5	Võ Thanh Tùng; Vietnam	Jamery Siga; Malaysia	Danh Hòa; Vietnam
100 m backstroke	S5	Võ Thanh Tùng; Vietnam	Zul Amirul Sidi Abdullah; Malaysia	Jamery Siga; Malaysia
50 m butterfly	S5	Jamery Siga; Malaysia	Maung Maung Soe; Myanmar	Muhammad Nur Syaiful Zulkafli; Malaysia
50 m breaststroke	SB4	Nguyễn Thành Trung; Vietnam	Danh Hòa; Vietnam	Ye Tun; Myanmar
100 m breaststroke	SB4	Nguyễn Thành Trung; Vietnam	Danh Hòa; Vietnam	Ye Tun; Myanmar
50 m freestyle	S6	Fajar Nur Hadianto; Indonesia	Prajim Reangsantie; Thailand	Lathdaxay Vonelachith; Laos
100 m freestyle	S6	Aung Myint Myat; Myanmar	Đỗ Thanh Hải; Vietnam	Prajim Reangsantie; Thailand
200 m freestyle	S6	Aung Myint Myat; Myanmar	Fajar Nur Hadianto; Indonesia	Aung Nyein Oo; Myanmar
400 m freestyle	S6	Aung Myint Myat; Myanmar	Fajar Nur Hadianto; Indonesia	Nanda Soe Min; Myanmar
50 m butterfly	S6	Naing Sit Aung; Myanmar	Kyaw Htoo; Myanmar	Boonyarit Payungsakul; Thailand
50 m breaststroke	SB5	Naing Sit Aung; Myanmar	Phetr Chanhom; Thailand	none awarded
200 m individual medley	SM6	Naing Sit Aung; Myanmar	Đỗ Thanh Hải; Vietnam	Kyaw Htoo; Myanmar
50 m freestyle	S7	Toh Wei Soong; Singapore	Lê Tiến Đạt; Vietnam	Kaweewat Sittichaiphonniti; Thailand
100 m freestyle	S7	Toh Wei Soong; Singapore	Kaweewat Sittichaiphonniti; Thailand	Suriansyah; Indonesia
400 m freestyle	S7	Gary Adornado Bejino; Philippines	Kaweewat Sittichaiphonniti; Thailand	none awarded
100 m backstroke	S7	Suriansyah; Indonesia	Toh Wei Soong; Singapore	Gary Adornado Bejino; Philippines
50 m freestyle	S8	Guntur; Indonesia	Nget Bor; Cambodia	Paibun Wongnonthaphum; Thailand
400 m freestyle	S8	Ernie Agat Gawilan; Philippines	Đặng Văn Công; Vietnam	Phiphatphong Sianglam; Thailand
100 m butterfly	S8	James Wong Tien Yu; Malaysia	Ernie Agat Gawilan; Philippines	Nguyễn Quang Vương; Vietnam
50 m breaststroke	SB7	Aris Wibawa; Indonesia	Aung Nyein Oo; Myanmar	Nanda Soe Min; Myanmar
100 m breaststroke	SB7	Aris Wibawa; Indonesia	Aung Nyein Oo; Myanmar	Đặng Văn Công; Vietnam
200 m individual medley	SM8	Ernie Agat Gawilan; Philippines	James Wong Tien Yu; Malaysia	Đặng Văn Công; Vietnam
50 m freestyle	S9	Võ Huỳnh Anh Khoa; Vietnam	Ahmad Azwari; Indonesia	Nguyễn Hoàng Nhã; Vietnam
100 m freestyle	S9	Võ Huỳnh Anh Khoa; Vietnam	Ahmad Azwari; Indonesia	Anurak Srinarong; Thailand
400 m freestyle	S9	Jendi Pangabean; Indonesia	Roland Bajo Sabido; Philippines	Phạm Thành Đạt; Vietnam
100 m backstroke	S9	Jendi Pangabean; Indonesia	Nguyễn Hoàng Nhã; Vietnam	Roland Bajo Sabido; Philippines
50 m butterfly	S9	Võ Huỳnh Anh Khoa; Vietnam	Phạm Thành Đạt; Vietnam	Ahmad Azwari; Indonesia
50 m breaststroke	SB8	Guntur; Indonesia	Nguyễn Quang Vương; Vietnam	Tandavong Lamphong; Laos
100 m breaststroke	SB8	Guntur; Indonesia	Nguyễn Quang Vương; Vietnam	James Wong Tien Yu; Malaysia
200 m individual medley	SM9	Jendi Pangabean; Indonesia	Nguyễn Ngọc Thiết; Vietnam	Nguyễn Hoàng Nhã; Vietnam
50 m freestyle	S10	Musa Mandan Karubaba; Indonesia	Aung Phone; Myanmar	Quách Văn Vinh; Vietnam
100 m freestyle	S10	Musa Mandan Karubaba; Indonesia	Tangkilisan Steven Sualang; Indonesia	Suphat Punsiri; Thailand
400 m freestyle	S10	Fraidden Dawan; Malaysia	Tangkilisan Steven Sualang; Indonesia	Suphat Punsiri; Thailand
50 m backstroke	S10	Tangkilisan Steven Sualang; Indonesia	Trương Quang Gon; Vietnam	Fraidden Dawan; Malaysia
100 m breaststroke	SB9	Aung Phone; Myanmar	Soe Win; Myanmar	none awarded
200 m individual medley	SM10	Fraidden Dawan; Malaysia	Aung Phone; Myanmar	Yav Vannak; Cambodia
50 m freestyle	S11	Thanongsak Hitakun; Thailand	Panom Lagsanaprim; Thailand	Nguyễn Văn Tùng; Vietnam
100 m freestyle	S11	Thanongsak Hitakun; Thailand	Nguyễn Văn Tùng; Vietnam	Pham Anh Tu; Vietnam
100 m backstroke	S11	Thanongsak Hitakun; Thailand	Kritaphat Witidkasemrot; Thailand	Dương Văn Ngọc; Vietnam
100 m butterfly	S11	Nguyễn Văn Tùng; Vietnam	Worawut Marnnok; Thailand	Kritaphat Witidkasemrot; Thailand
100 m breaststroke	SB11	Panom Lagsanaprim; Thailand	Kritaphat Witidkasemrot; Thailand	Sunarto; Indonesia
50 m freestyle	S12	Menaser Meriba Numberi; Indonesia	Nguyễn Đức Hậu; Vietnam	none awarded
100 m freestyle	S12	Menaser Meriba Numberi; Indonesia	Julius Jaranding; Malaysia	Bùi Văn Tình; Vietnam
50 m freestyle	S13	Marinus Melianus Yowei; Indonesia	Trần Quốc Phi; Vietnam	Wong Zhi Wei; Singapore
100 m freestyle	S13	Trần Quốc Phi; Vietnam	Wong Zhi Wei; Singapore	Chaiporn Laobeng; Thailand
50 m breaststroke	SB13	Marinus Melianus Yowei; Indonesia	Julius Jaranding; Malaysia	Chaiporn Laobeng; Thailand
100 m breaststroke	SB13	Marinus Melianus Yowei; Indonesia	Julius Jaranding; Malaysia	Nguyễn Văn Hạnh; Vietnam
50 m freestyle	S14	Muhammad Bejita; Indonesia	Anas Zul Amirul Sidi; Malaysia	Mohd Adib Iqbal Abdullah; Malaysia
100 m freestyle	S14	Anas Zul Amirul Sidi; Malaysia	Benson Tan Eng Kiong; Singapore	Zadrian Chan Zhi Weng; Malaysia
200 m freestyle	S14	Kevin Ode Natama; Indonesia	Zadrian Chan Zhi Weng; Malaysia	Benson Tan Eng Kiong; Singapore
50 m backstroke	S14	Muhammad Bejita; Indonesia	Ting Jin Ping; Malaysia	Zadrian Chan Zhi Weng; Malaysia
100 m backstroke	S14	Muhammad Bejita; Indonesia	Ting Jin Ping; Malaysia	Chuvong Jirachot; Thailand
50 m butterfly	S14	Yoong Chung Wei; Malaysia	Daniel Nugroho Wijayanto; Indonesia	Mongkolchai Chanwit; Thailand
50 m breaststroke	SB14	Irfan Septiana; Indonesia	Muhammad Samsi; Indonesia	Mohd Adib Iqbal Abdullah; Malaysia
100 m breaststroke	SB14	Muhammad Samsi; Indonesia	Irfan Septiana; Indonesia	Mohd Adib Iqbal Abdullah; Malaysia
200 m individual medley	SM14	Muhammad Samsi; Indonesia	Yoong Chung Wei; Malaysia	Daniel Nugroho Wijayanto; Indonesia
4 × 100 m freestyle relay	S14	Indonesia; Daniel Nugroho Wijayanto; Kevin Ode Natama; Muhammad Bejita; Muhammad Samsi	Malaysia; Mohd Adib Iqbal Abdullah; Anas Zul Amirul Sidi; Yoong Chung Wei; Zadrian Chan Zhi Weng	Thailand; Chuvong Jirachot; Kaewtrakunpong Suprakit; Mongkolchai Chanwit; Panthong Woranat
4 × 100 m medley relay	S14	Indonesia; Daniel Nugroho Wijayanto; Irfan Septiana; Kevin Ode Natama; Muhammad Bejita	Malaysia; Mohd Adib Iqbal Abdullah; Anas Zul Amirul Sidi; Ting Jin Ping; Yoong Chung Wei	Thailand; Chuvong Jirachot; Kaewtrakunpong Suprakit; Dej Maneerat; Mongkolchai Chanwit
4 × 100 m freestyle relay	34 pts	Indonesia; Guntur; Jendi Pangabean; Musa Mandan Karubaba; Suriansyah	Vietnam; Lê Tiến Đạt; Nguyễn Hoàng Nhã; Nguyễn Ngọc Thiết; Võ Huỳnh Anh Khoa	Philippines; Arnel Navales Aba; Ernie Agat Gawilan; Gary Adornado Bejino; Roland Bajo Sabido
4 × 100 m medley relay	34 pts	Indonesia; Guntur; Jendi Pangabean; Musa Mandan Karubaba; Suriansyah	Vietnam; Đặng Văn Công; Nguyễn Hoàng Nhã; Nguyễn Quang Vương; Võ Huỳnh Anh Khoa	Philippines; Arnel Navales Aba; Ernie Agat Gawilan; Gary Adornado Bejino; Roland Bajo Sabido

=== Women ===
Event	Class	Gold	Silver	Bronze
50 m freestyle	S5	Laura Aurelia Dinda Sekar Devanti; Indonesia	Theresa Goh Rui Si; Singapore	Nopparat Tanbut; Thailand
100 m breaststroke	SB4	Theresa Goh Rui Si; Singapore	Danh Thị Mỹ Thanh; Vietnam	Nopparat Tanbut; Thailand
100 m freestyle	S6	Laura Aurelia Dinda Sekar Devanti; Indonesia	Theresa Goh Rui Si; Singapore	Riyanti; Indonesia
100 m breaststroke	SB5	Trịnh Thị Bích Như; Vietnam	Nguyễn Thị Sa Ri; Vietnam	none awarded
50 m freestyle	S7	Trịnh Thị Bích Như; Vietnam	Vi Thị Hằng; Vietnam	Pattra Krangphanit; Thailand
100 m freestyle	S7	Vi Thị Hằng; Vietnam	Hatsady Boulaphane; Laos	Pattra Krangphanit; Thailand
100 m breaststroke	SB6	Vi Thị Hằng; Vietnam	Riyanti; Indonesia	Dương Thị Lan; Vietnam
50 m freestyle	S8	Carmen Lim; Malaysia	Thongbai Chaisawas; Thailand	Nor Aimah; Indonesia
100 m freestyle	S8	Thongbai Chaisawas; Thailand	Carmen Lim; Malaysia	Nor Aimah; Indonesia
100 m backstroke	S8	Gusmalayanti; Indonesia	Carmen Lim; Malaysia	Wilasini Wongnonthapoom; Thailand
100 m breaststroke	SB7	Nor Aimah; Indonesia	Gusmalayanti; Indonesia	Panisa Vipod; Thailand
100 m freestyle	S9	Anchaya Ketkeaw; Thailand	Surerut Komkeaw; Thailand	Lê Thị Dung; Vietnam
50 m freestyle	S10	Sapia Rumbaru; Indonesia	Lê Thị Trâm; Vietnam	Rusdiana; Indonesia
100 m freestyle	S10	Sapia Rumbaru; Indonesia	Lê Thị Trâm; Vietnam	Rusdiana; Indonesia
50 m freestyle	S14	Syuci Indriani; Indonesia	Danielle Moi Yan Ting; Singapore	Ayu Andira; Indonesia
100 m freestyle	S14	Syuci Indriani; Indonesia	Danielle Moi Yan Ting; Singapore	Claire Sunega Calizo; Philippines
200 m freestyle	S14	Danielle Moi Yan Ting; Singapore	Claire Sunega Calizo; Philippines	Chew Zi Ling; Singapore
50 m breaststroke	SB14	Lince Suebu; Indonesia	Ayu Andira; Indonesia	Puteri Nur Diyana Jawahir; Malaysia
100 m breaststroke	SB14	Syuci Indriani; Indonesia	Lince Suebu; Indonesia	Ayu Andira; Indonesia

== See also ==
- Swimming at the 2017 Southeast Asian Games
