= Wheelchair tennis at the 2017 ASEAN Para Games =

Wheelchair Tennis at the 2017 ASEAN Para Games was held at National Tennis Centre, Jalan Duta, Kuala Lumpur.

== Medal tally ==
* Host nation (Malaysia)

Rank	Nation	Gold	Silver	Bronze	Total
1	Malaysia (MAS)*	2	1	3	6
2	Thailand (THA)	1	2	3	6
Totals (2 entries)		3	3	6	12

== Medalists ==
Event	Gold	Silver	Bronze
Men's singles	Abu Samah Borhan; Malaysia	Suthi Khlongrua; Thailand	Yusshazwan Yusoff; Malaysia
Men's singles	Abu Samah Borhan; Malaysia	Suthi Khlongrua; Thailand	Ariffahmi Zaquan Ariffin; Malaysia
Quad singles	Azman Hasan; Malaysia	Sombut Yampapha; Thailand	Pol Janteam; Thailand
Quad singles	Azman Hasan; Malaysia	Sombut Yampapha; Thailand	Nattaporn Taosrisakul; Thailand
Men's doubles	Thailand (THA); Suthi Khlongrua; Wittaya Peemee	Malaysia (MAS); Abu Samah Borhan; Ariffahmi Zaquan Ariffin	Malaysia (MAS); Yusshazwan Yusoff; Firdaus Ibrahim
Men's doubles	Thailand (THA); Suthi Khlongrua; Wittaya Peemee	Malaysia (MAS); Abu Samah Borhan; Ariffahmi Zaquan Ariffin	Thailand (THA); Banjob Suwan; Sunthon Sridaeng

== See also ==
- Tennis at the 2017 Southeast Asian Games
