= Chess at the 2017 ASEAN Para Games =

- Venue: MATRADE Exhibition and Convention Centre
- Location: Kuala Lumpur, Malaysia
- Date: 18–22 September 2017

Chess at the 2017 ASEAN Para Games was held at Malaysian International Trade & Exhibition Centre, Kuala Lumpur.

== Medal tally ==
* Host nation (Malaysia)

Rank	Nation	Gold	Silver	Bronze	Total
1	Indonesia (INA)	14	9	5	28
2	Vietnam (VIE)	4	9	5	18
3	Philippines (PHI)	4	3	6	13
4	Malaysia (MAS)*	2	2	2	6
5	Myanmar (MYA)	0	1	6	7
Totals (5 entries)		24	24	24	72

== Medalists ==
=== Men ===
Event	Class	Gold	Silver	Bronze
Individual standard	B1	Edy Suryanto; Indonesia	Đào Tuấn Kiệt; Vietnam	Carsidi; Indonesia
Team standard	B1	Indonesia (INA); Edy Suryanto; Carsidi; Hendi Wirawan	Vietnam (VIE); Đào Tuấn Kiệt; Nguyễn Mạnh Hùng	Philippines (PHI); Cecilio Espina Bilog; Francis Bautista Ching; Rodolfo de Villa Sarmiento
Individual rapid	B1	Edy Suryanto; Indonesia	Đào Tuấn Kiệt; Vietnam	Than Htay; Myanmar
Team rapid	B1	Indonesia (INA); Edy Suryanto; Hendi Wirawan; Carsidi	Vietnam (VIE); Đào Tuấn Kiệt; Nguyễn Mạnh Hùng	Myanmar (MYA); Than Htay; Kaung San; Myo San Aung
Individual standard	B2/3	Gayuh Satrio; Indonesia	Menandro Junni Redor; Philippines	Arman Sapida Subaste; Philippines
Team standard	B2/3	Philippines (PHI); Menandro Junni Redor; Arman Sapida Subaste; Israel dela Rosa Peligro	Indonesia (INA); Gayuh Satrio; Adji Hartono; Umar Zulkifli	Malaysia (MAS); Hanson Ang Ping Ting; Saharuddin Mappa; Mahadzir Derani Abdul Ghani
Individual rapid	B2/3	Gayuh Satrio; Indonesia	Adji Hartono; Indonesia	Arman Sapida Subaste; Philippines
Team rapid	B2/3	Indonesia (INA); Gayuh Satrio; Adji Hartono; Umar Zulkifli	Philippines (PHI); Arman Sapida Subaste; Menandro Junni Redor; Israel dela Rosa Peligro	Malaysia (MAS); Saharuddin Mappa; Shaharuddin Sidek; Mohamad Farhan Shukry Jamil
Individual standard	PI	Sander de Erit Severino; Philippines	Maksum Firdaus; Indonesia	Azhar Panjaitan; Indonesia
Team standard	PI	Philippines (PHI); Sander de Erit Severino; Henry Roger Iligan Lopez; Felix Mijares Aguilera	Indonesia (INA); Maksum Firdaus; Azhar Panjaitan; Sutikno	Vietnam (VIE); Nguyễn Anh Tuấn; Nguyễn Văn Quân
Individual rapid	PI	Maksum Firdaus; Indonesia	Henry Roger Iligan Lopez; Philippines	Sander de Erit Severino; Philippines
Team rapid	PI	Philippines (PHI); Henry Roger Iligan Lopez; Sander de Erit Severino; Felix Mijares Aguilera	Indonesia (INA); Maksum Firdaus; Azhar Panjaitan; Sutikno	Vietnam (VIE); Nguyễn Anh Tuấn; Nguyễn Văn Quân

=== Women ===
Event	Class	Gold	Silver	Bronze
Individual standard	B1	Tati Karhati; Indonesia	Debi Ariesta; Indonesia	Phạm Thị Hương; Vietnam
Team standard	B1	Indonesia (INA); Tati Karhati; Debi Ariesta; Wilma Margaretha Sinaga	Myanmar (MYA); Yan Pu; Ze Ma Sar; Thae Su San	Vietnam (VIE); Phạm Thị Hương; Đào Thị Lê Xuân
Individual rapid	B1	Phạm Thị Hương; Vietnam	Debi Ariesta; Indonesia	Yan Pu; Myanmar
Team rapid	B1	Indonesia (INA); Debi Ariesta; Tati Karhati; Wilma Margaretha Sinaga	Vietnam (VIE); Phạm Thị Hương; Đào Thị Lê Xuân	Myanmar (MYA); Yan Pu; Ze Ma Sar; Ohn Mar Htwe
Individual standard	B2/3	Nur Feiqha Maulad Halil; Malaysia	Nguyễn Thị Mỹ Linh; Vietnam	Aisah Wijayanti Putri Brahmana; Indonesia
Team standard	B2/3	Vietnam (VIE); Nguyễn Thị Mỹ Linh; Nguyễn Thị Minh Thư; Nguyễn Thị Hồng Châu	Malaysia (MAS); Nur Feiqha Maulad Halil; Norain Fatihah Yusoff; Seri Izdihar Shoberi	Myanmar (MYA); Phyu Phyu Win; Aye Khin; Phyo Wai Khin
Individual rapid	B2/3	Nur Feiqha Maulad Halil; Malaysia	Nguyễn Thị Minh Thư; Vietnam	Aisah Wijayanti Putri Brahmana; Indonesia
Team rapid	B2/3	Vietnam (VIE); Nguyễn Thị Minh Thư; Nguyễn Thị Hồng Châu; Nguyễn Thị Mỹ Linh	Malaysia (MAS); Nur Feiqha Maulad Halil; Seri Izdihar Shoberi; Nur Izzati Zakaria	Myanmar (MYA); Phyu Phyu Win; Phyo Wai Khin; Aye Khin
Individual standard	PI	Ade R. Nasution; Indonesia	Nasip Farta Simanja; Indonesia	Trần Thị Bích Thủy; Vietnam
Team standard	PI	Indonesia (INA); Ade R. Nasution; Nasip Farta Simanja; Yuni	Vietnam (VIE); Trần Thị Bích Thủy; Đoàn Thu Huyền; Nguyễn Thị Kiều	Philippines (PHI); Jean-Lee Rosero Nacita; Fe Navarette Mangayayam
Individual rapid	PI	Trần Thị Bích Thủy; Vietnam	Nasip Farta Simanja; Indonesia	Ade R. Nasution; Indonesia
Team rapid	PI	Indonesia (INA); Nasip Farta Simanja; Ade R. Nasution; Yuni	Vietnam (VIE); Trần Thị Bích Thủy; Đoàn Thu Huyền; Nguyễn Thị Kiều	Philippines (PHI); Jean-Lee Rosero Nacita; Fe Navarette Mangayayam
