= Football 5-a-side at the 2017 ASEAN Para Games =

Football 5-a-side at the 2017 ASEAN Para Games will be held at Malaysia National Hockey Stadium, National Sports Complex, Malaysia.

== Medal table ==
* Host nation (Malaysia)

| Rank | Nation | Gold | Silver | Bronze | Total |
|---|---|---|---|---|---|
| 1 | Thailand (THA) | 1 | 0 | 0 | 1 |
| 2 | Laos (LAO) | 0 | 1 | 0 | 1 |
| 3 | Malaysia (MAS)* | 0 | 0 | 1 | 1 |
| Totals (3 entries) | | 1 | 1 | 1 | 3 |

== Medalists ==
| Event | Gold | Silver | Bronze |
|---|---|---|---|
| Men | Thailand (THA); Kittikorn Baodee; Terdkiat Boontiang; Vanpra Angsunak; Prakrong Buayai; Sutatchai Khowsaard; Chinakorn Pongsapang; Kittithat Wimolwan; Panyawut Kupan; Narutchai Permpoonputcharasook; Teerawat Kaewwilai | Laos (LAO); Lathavong Ouday; Douangvilay Somsak; Sayavong Vilaysone; Senglathone Phouvone; Vanephengphanh Bounchob; Xayyapanya Khoun; Douangbounxay Bounhome; Mungsong; Souvannasok Xaysavath; Vongsenphet Keutmisay | Malaysia (MAS); Azril Che Ibrahim; Mohamad Amirul Arif Bin Mahadhir; Mohamad Asri Bin Arshad; Mohd Zamha Bin Abdul Wahab; Rollen Bin Marakim; Ahmad Fikri Bin Omar; Muhamad Azuan Bin Abdul Rasiad; Sulaiman Bin Nor Azizan; Meor Shahrul Azha Bin Mat Salleh; Ahmad Bustaman Bin Mohd Ali |

== See also ==
- Football at the 2017 Southeast Asian Games
