= Bowling at the 2017 ASEAN Para Games =

- Venue: Megalanes, Sunway Pyramid
- Location: Subang Jaya, Selangor, Malaysia
- Date: 19–22 September 2017

Bowling at the 2017 ASEAN Para Games was held at Megalanes, Sunway Pyramid, Subang Jaya, Selangor, Malaysia.

== Medal tally ==
* Host nation (Malaysia)

Rank	Nation	Gold	Silver	Bronze	Total
1	Malaysia (MAS)*	11	9	4	24
2	Thailand (THA)	3	2	6	11
3	Singapore (SGP)	2	1	5	8
4	Philippines (PHI)	1	3	3	7
5	Brunei (BRU)	1	3	0	4
6	Indonesia (INA)	0	0	1	1
Totals (6 entries)		18	18	19	55

== Medalists ==
=== Men ===
Event	Class	Gold	Silver	Bronze
Singles	TPB4	Muhammad Farhan Ismail; Singapore	Syed Umar Syed Abdullah Thani; Malaysia	Nixon Fan Jun Jie; Singapore
Singles	TPB8	P Chumchai; Thailand	Supparat Ponmingmad; Thailand	Augusto Hernandez; Philippines

=== Women ===
Event	Class	Gold	Silver	Bronze
Singles	TPB4	Nur Syazwani Marais; Malaysia	Eliyana Johari; Malaysia	Diane Neo Pei Lin; Singapore
Singles	TPB8	Noor Lizah Salman; Malaysia	Ruzila Mustafa; Malaysia	Rohayati; Indonesia

=== Mixed ===
Event	Class	Gold	Silver	Bronze
Singles	TPB1	Muhamad Hairul Miran; Malaysia	Virasak Tangpoolpun; Thailand	Krisada Kietkongtawee; Thailand
Singles	TPB2	Muhamad Suhaili Abdul Hamid; Malaysia	Kamarul Ariffin Abdul Ghaffar; Brunei	Choo Kam Chan; Malaysia
Singles	TPB3	Mohamed Ismail Hussain; Singapore	Mohd Rizal Hassan; Malaysia	Noresham Manaf; Malaysia
Singles	TPB9	Christopher Chiu Yue; Philippines	Mohd Azrin Rahim; Malaysia	Abu Bakar Nyat; Malaysia
Singles	TPB10	Raiwin Phisitthanakul; Thailand	Muhamad Amin Abdul Rashid; Malaysia	Tan Swang Hee; Singapore
Doubles	TPB1+TPB3	Malaysia (MAS); Muhamad Hairul Miran; Mohd Rizal Hassan	Malaysia (MAS); Azuan Amir Hassan; Noresham Manaf	Singapore (SGP); Thomas Nathan Chan Kim Yong; Mohamed Ismail Hussain
Doubles	TPB2+TPB2	Brunei (BRU); Kamarul Ariffin Abdul Ghaffar; Saidin Haji Awang Damit	Malaysia (MAS); Choo Kam Chan; Muhamad Suhaili Abdul Hamid	Thailand (THA); C Boripat; Sangwang Weerapol
Doubles	TPB8+TPB8	Thailand (THA); P Chumchai; Supparat Ponmingmad	Philippines (PHI); Francisco Ednaco; Jaime Manginga	Malaysia (MAS); Mohd Khairul Ishak; Zahidi Lamsah
Doubles	TPB8+TPB8	Thailand (THA); P Chumchai; Supparat Ponmingmad	Philippines (PHI); Francisco Ednaco; Jaime Manginga	Singapore (SGP); Anuar Saaid; Tay Leong Hock
Doubles	TPB9+TPB9	Malaysia (MAS); Abu Bakar Nyat; Mohd Azrin Rahim	Malaysia (MAS); Nadia Syafika Abdul Rahman; Wong Kee Soon	Philippines (PHI); Angelito Guloya; Christopher Chiu Yue
Doubles	TPB10+TPB10	Malaysia (MAS); Abdul Rahman Bava Kutty; Muhamad Amin Abdul Rashid	Philippines (PHI); Kim Ian Chi; Samuel Llanos Matias	Thailand (THA); Chaiwat Achatongkum; Raiwin Phisitthanakul
Trios	TPB1+TPB2+TPB3	Malaysia (MAS); Muhamad Hairul Miran; Muhamad Suhaili Abdul Hamid; Mohd Rizal Hassan	Brunei (BRU); Muhammad Jamary Danggat; Saidin Haji Awang Damit; Khairul Anuar Abdul Ghaffar	Thailand (THA); Krisada Kietkongtawee; C Boripat; Kiattikarn Manokham
Trios	TPB8+TPB9+TPB10	Malaysia (MAS); Zahidi Lamsah; Mohd Azrin Rahim; Muhamad Amin Abdul Rashid	Singapore (SGP); Anuar Saaid; Bahkia Hashim; Tan Swang Hee	Philippines (PHI); Augusto Hernandez; Christopher Chiu Yue; Kim Ian Chi
Team	TPB1+TPB2+TPB2+TPB3	Malaysia (MAS); Muhamad Hairul Miran; Choo Kam Chan; Muhamad Suhaili Abdul Hamid; Mohd Rizal Hassan	Brunei (BRU); Muhammad Jamary Danggat; Kamarul Ariffin Abdul Ghaffar; Saidin Haji Awang Damit; Khairul Anuar Abdul Ghaffar	Thailand (THA); Virasak Tangpoolpun; C Boripat; Sangwang Weerapol; Chanchiao Khao
Team	TPB8+TPB9+TPB9+TPB10	Malaysia (MAS); Zahidi Lamsah; Abu Bakar Nyat; Wong Kee Soon; Muhamad Amin Abdul Rashid	Philippines (PHI); Jaime Manginga; Angelito Guloya; Christopher Chiu Yue; Kim Ian Chi	Thailand (THA); Sinthusuwan Suphan; Padpong Sawai; Ruamsab Somsak; Raiwin Phisitthanakul

== See also ==
- Bowling at the 2017 Southeast Asian Games
