= Boccia at the 2017 ASEAN Para Games =

- Venue: MATRADE Exhibition and Convention Centre
- Location: Kuala Lumpur, Malaysia
- Date: 18–22 September 2017

Boccia at the 2017 ASEAN Para Games was held at Malaysian International Trade and Exhibition Centre, Kuala Lumpur.

== Medal tally ==
* Host nation (Malaysia)

Rank	Nation	Gold	Silver	Bronze	Total
1	Thailand (THA)	7	2	2	11
2	Malaysia (MAS)*	0	4	2	6
3	Singapore (SGP)	0	1	2	3
Totals (3 entries)		7	7	6	20

== Medalists ==
Event	Class	Gold	Silver	Bronze
Individual	BC1	Witsanu Huadpradit; Thailand	Leah Chin Kit; Malaysia	Subin Tipmanee; Thailand
Individual	BC2	Boontep Pachdee; Thailand	Lee Chee Hoong; Malaysia	Worawut Saengampa; Thailand
Individual	BC3	Pongsathorn Poolket; Thailand	Ekkarat Chaemchoi; Thailand	Toh Sze Ning; Singapore
Individual	BC4	Ritthikrai Somsanuk; Thailand	Pornchok Larpyen; Thailand	Aminoor Farid Najuddin; Malaysia
Pairs	BC3	Thailand; Ekkarat Chaemchoi; Pongsathorn Poolket	Singapore; Faye Lim Yu Fei; Toh Sze Ning	Malaysia; Fua Chee Keong; Teh Kar Wei
Pairs	BC4	Thailand; Pornchok Larpyen; Ritthikrai Somsanuk	Malaysia; Aminoor Farid Najuddin; Lim Hock Lai	none awarded
Team	BC1/2	Thailand; Boontep Pachdee; Witsanu Huadpradit; Worawut Saengampa	Malaysia; Leah Chin Kit; Lee Chee Hoong; Mohd Syafiq Noh; Chew Wei Lun	Singapore; Juni Syafiqa Jumat; Neo Kah Whye; Omar Azman

== See also ==
- Lawn bowls at the 2017 Southeast Asian Games
- Pétanque at the 2017 Southeast Asian Games
