= Wheelchair basketball at the 2017 ASEAN Para Games =

Wheelchair basketball at the 2017 ASEAN Para Games was held at Malaysian International Trade & Exhibition Centre (MITEC), Kuala Lumpur.

== Medal summary ==
* Host nation (Malaysia)

Rank	Nation	Gold	Silver	Bronze	Total
1	Thailand (THA)	2	0	0	2
2	Malaysia (MAS)*	0	2	0	2
3	Philippines (PHI)	0	0	2	2
Totals (3 entries)		2	2	2	6

== Medalists ==
Event	Gold	Silver	Bronze
Men's 3-on-3	Thailand (THA); Aekkasit Jumjarean; Kwanchai Pimkorn; Niwat Kongta; Surasit Nirat; Visut Suk-on	Malaysia (MAS); Ahmad Nazri Hamzah; Hafizuddin Bahrin; Mohd Razzuwad Mat Seman; Muhammad Azzwar Hassan Asaari; Muhammad Roozaimi Johari	Philippines (PHI); Cleford Patagnan Trocino; John Rey Aguirre Escalante; Juanito Cerezo Mingarine; Marcos Maurecio Rabasto, Jr. Rene Gajano Macabenguil
Men's team	Thailand (THA); Aekkasit Jumjarean; Kwanchai Pimkorn; Niwat Kongta; Surasit Nirat; Visut Suk-on; Roongrote Chaiman; Athin Singdong; Tawatchai Jasin; Mathee Yenkuan; Pongsakorn Sripirom; Noppadol Wannaborworn; Jakkapan Jansupin	Malaysia (MAS); Ahmad Nazri Hamzah; Hafizuddin Bahrin; Mohd Razzuwad Mat Seman; Muhammad Azzwar Hassan Asaari; Muhammad Roozaimi Johari; Zulfikri Zakaria; Razali Cantik; Chua Tze Kah; Muhamad Khairul Azman Khairi; Mohamad Azwan Mohd Yusoff; Muhamad Atib Zakaria; Freday Tan Yei Bing	Philippines (PHI); Cleford Patagnan Trocino; John Rey Aguirre Escalante; Juanito Cerezo Mingarine; Marcos Maurecio Rabasto, Jr. Rene Gajano Macabenguil; Marlon Mercader Nacita; Jefferson Legaspi Legacion; Alfie Quinones Cabanog; Alex Nicolas Teves; Freddie Penabella Magdayo; Kenneth Christopher Isleta Tapia; Mark Anthony Ramirez

== See also ==
- Basketball at the 2017 Southeast Asian Games
