= Cycling at the 2017 ASEAN Para Games =

- Venue: Nilai; Putrajaya
- Date: 17–21 September 2017

Para-cycling at the 2017 ASEAN Para Games was held at two locations in the Klang Valley. Track cycling was held in Nilai Velodrome, Negeri Sembilan whereas Road Cycling was held in Putrajaya.

== Classification ==
B – tandem bicycle

This class is for athletes who have visual impairments and therefore ride tandem bicycles with a guide (known as a pilot). They may have any level of visual impairment from no light perception in either eye through to a visual acuity of 6/60 and/or a visual field of less than 20 degrees.

H (1–5) – handcycle

This class is for athletes who are lower limb amputees, have paraplegia or tetraplegia and ride a handcycle using arms to turn pedals for propulsion. H1–4 cyclists compete in a lying position, whereas H5 cyclists compete in a kneeling position.

T (1–2) – tricycle

This class is for athletes who have a neurological condition or an impairment which has a comparable effect on their cycling so that they are not able to compete on a standard bicycle for reasons of balance.

C (1–5) – standard bicycle

This class is for athletes with moderate locomotion impairment who do not require a tricycle. In many cases a modification will be allowed to accommodate a leg or arm prosthesis.

== Medal tally ==
* Host nation (Malaysia)

Rank	Nation	Gold	Silver	Bronze	Total
1	Malaysia (MAS)*	22	12	5	39
2	Indonesia (INA)	2	3	7	12
3	Singapore (SGP)	1	5	8	14
4	Philippines (PHI)	1	4	1	6
5	Brunei (BRU)	0	0	1	1
Totals (5 entries)		26	24	22	72

== Medalists ==
=== Road cycling ===
==== Men's events ====
Event	Class	Gold	Silver	Bronze
Time trial	B	Mohd Khairul Hazwan Wahab; Malaysia	Jessen Ng Hang Siew; Singapore	Tee Wee Leong; Singapore
Road race	B	Aiman Asyraff Ahmad Bajuri; Malaysia	Khairul Nizam Ali; Malaysia	Mohd Khairul Hazwan Wahab; Malaysia
Road race	C1, C2, C3	Mohamad Syazwan Roshdi; Malaysia	Muhammad Adi Raimie Amizazahan; Malaysia	Mohamad Yusof Hafizi Shaharuddin; Malaysia
Time trial	C4	Mohd Najib Turano; Malaysia	Fadli Immammuddin; Indonesia	Godfrey Ezperanzate Taberna; Philippines
Road race	C4	Mohd Najib Turano; Malaysia	Godfrey Ezperanzate Taberna; Philippines	Fadli Immammuddin; Indonesia
Time trial	C5	Arthus Eustaquio Bucay; Philippines	Zuhairie Ahmad Tarmizi; Malaysia	Sufyan Saori; Indonesia
Road race	C5	Zuhairie Ahmad Tarmizi; Malaysia	Arthus Eustaquio Bucay; Philippines	Sufyan Saori; Indonesia
Time trial	H1–H5	Lim Tao Keong; Malaysia	Naren Lee Sankar; Singapore	I Wayan Damai; Indonesia
Road race	H1–H5	Lim Tao Keong; Malaysia	I Wayan Damai; Indonesia	Noor Iskandaria Mohd Dena; Singapore

==== Women's events ====
Event	Class	Gold	Silver	Bronze
Time trial	B	Emily Lee Seok Bee; Singapore	Nur Azlia Syafinaz Mohd Zais; Malaysia	Delia Kang Ting Ling; Singapore
Road race	B	Nur Azlia Syafinaz Mohd Zais; Malaysia	Emily Lee Seok Bee; Singapore	none awarded
Time trial	H1–H5	Ni Kadek Karyadewi; Indonesia	none awarded	none awarded
Road race	H1–H5	Ni Kadek Karyadewi; Indonesia	none awarded	none awarded

==== Mixed events ====
Event	Class	Gold	Silver	Bronze
Time trial	C1, C2, C3	Mohamad Yusof Hafizi Shaharuddin; Malaysia	Muhammad Adi Raimie Amizazahan; Malaysia	Hamizan Samsudin; Brunei

=== Track cycling ===
==== Men's events ====
Event	Class	Gold	Silver	Bronze
Kilometer	B	Muhammad Afiq Afify Rizan; Malaysia	Muhammad Amin Najmi Romzi; Malaysia	Jessen Ng Hang Siew; Singapore
Sprint	B	Muhammad Afiq Afify Rizan; Malaysia	Muhammad Amin Najmi Romzi; Malaysia	Jessen Ng Hang Siew; Singapore
Pursuit	B	Muhammad Amin Najmi Romzi; Malaysia	Muhammad Afiq Afify Rizan; Malaysia	Jessen Ng Hang Siew; Singapore
Kilometer	C1, C2, C3	Muhammad Adi Raimie Amizazahan; Malaysia	Mohamad Yusof Hafizi Shaharuddin; Malaysia	Tan Hun Boon; Singapore
Kilometer	C4	Mohd Najib Turano; Malaysia	Muhammad Hafiz Jamali; Malaysia	Fadli Immammuddin; Indonesia
Pursuit	C4	Mohd Najib Turano; Malaysia	Fadli Immammuddin; Indonesia	none awarded
Kilometer	C5	Zuhairie Ahmad Tarmizi; Malaysia	Arthus Eustaquio Bucay; Philippines	Sufyan Saori; Indonesia
Pursuit	C5	Zuhairie Ahmad Tarmizi; Malaysia	Arthus Eustaquio Bucay; Philippines	Sufyan Saori; Indonesia

==== Women's events ====
Event	Class	Gold	Silver	Bronze
Kilometer	B	Nur Azlia Syafinaz Mohd Zais; Malaysia	Nur Syahida Tajudin; Malaysia	Emily Lee Seok Bee; Singapore
Sprint	B	Nur Azlia Syafinaz Mohd Zais; Malaysia	Emily Lee Seok Bee; Singapore	Nur Syahida Tajudin; Malaysia
Pursuit	B	Nur Azlia Syafinaz Mohd Zais; Malaysia	Emily Lee Seok Bee; Singapore	Nur Syahida Tajudin; Malaysia

==== Mixed events ====
Event	Class	Gold	Silver	Bronze
Pursuit	C1, C2, C3	Shukor Farhan Suliman; Malaysia	Muhd Nabil Rosli; Malaysia	Nur Faizah Aziz; Malaysia

== See also ==
- Cycling at the 2017 Southeast Asian Games
