= Sitting volleyball at the 2017 ASEAN Para Games =

Sitting volleyball at the 2017 ASEAN Para Games was held at Malaysian International Trade & Exhibition Centre (MITEC), Kuala Lumpur.

== Medal summary ==
Rank	Nation	Gold	Silver	Bronze	Total
1	Myanmar (MYA)	1	0	0	1
2	Cambodia (CAM)	0	1	0	1
3	Thailand (THA)	0	0	1	1
Totals (3 entries)		1	1	1	3

== Medalists ==
Event	Gold	Silver	Bronze
Men	Myanmar (MYA); Kan Htoo Nyein; Ko Ko Naing; Kyaw Kyaw Htwe; Maung Phyo; Min Naing Oo; Mya Min; Mya Soe; Saw Min Hteik; Sein Htay Win; Thein Swe; Yan Naing Tun; Zaw Moe Aung	Cambodia (CAM); Ing Phiream; Kao Hoeurn; Mon Yaranh; Oeun Nut; Ou Phalla; Pon Dina; Saing Veasna; Srieng Sokna; Tong Ravy	Thailand (THA); Arthan Ketsena; Boonlerd Soyphet; Charoen Srithup; Jakre Nakkham; Janhom Mooyotha; K. Yuenyong; Manop Muncharoen; Paitoon; Sarun Karpmaichan; Sura Chumphang; Thiwa Thuratham; Wuttichai Namjring

== See also ==
- Volleyball at the 2017 Southeast Asian Games
