= Archery at the 2017 ASEAN Para Games =

- Venue: Nilai; Putrajaya
- Date: 20–22 September 2017

Archery at the 2017 ASEAN Para Games was held at synthetic turf field at the National Sports Complex in Kuala Lumpur, Malaysia.

== Events ==
Archery events at the 2017 ASEAN Para Games
Men's individual		Women's individual		Mixed pair	
Compound	Recurve	Compound	Recurve	Compound	Recurve

== Medal tally ==
* Host nation (Malaysia)

Rank	Nation	Gold	Silver	Bronze	Total
1	Thailand (THA)	3	0	2	5
2	Indonesia (INA)	1	3	0	4
3	Malaysia (MAS)*	1	2	3	6
4	Singapore (SGP)	1	0	1	2
5	Philippines (PHI)	0	1	0	1
Totals (5 entries)		6	6	6	18

== Medalists ==
=== Recurve ===
Event	Gold	Silver	Bronze
Men's individual	Hanreuchai Netsiri; Thailand	Giovanni Mawagay Ola; Philippines	Hasihin Sanawi; Malaysia
Women's individual	Wasana Khuthawisap; Thailand	Vironika Ninik Umardyani; Indonesia	Ananthy Lachimanan; Malaysia
Mixed team	Thailand; Hanreuchai Netsiri; Wasana Khuthawisap	Indonesia; Muhammad Nurhadi; Vironika Ninik Umardyani	Malaysia; Hasihin Sanawi; Ananthy Lachimanan

=== Compound ===
Event	Gold	Silver	Bronze
Men's individual	Toto Wastomi; Indonesia	Morogen Komoran; Malaysia	Anon Aungaphinan; Thailand
Women's individual	Nur Syahidah Alim; Singapore	Nor Sa'adah Abdul Wahab; Malaysia	Rhomshalee Katemongkon; Thailand
Mixed team	Malaysia; Morogen Komoran; Nor Sa'adah Abdul Wahab	Indonesia; Toto Wastomi; Tuwariyah	Singapore; Robert Fuchs; Nur Syahidah Alim

== See also ==
- Archery at the 2017 Southeast Asian Games
