= 2017 ASEAN Para Games =

9th ASEAN Para Games

IX ASEAN Para Games
- Host city: Kuala Lumpur, Malaysia
- Motto: Rising Together (Malay: Bangkit Bersama)
- Nations: 11
- Athletes: 1452
- Events: 369 in 16 sports
- Opening: 17 September
- Closing: 23 September
- Opened by: Najib Razak; Prime Minister of Malaysia
- Athlete's Oath: Sharifah Raudzah Syed Akil
- Judge's Oath: Teo Kian Joo
- Torch lighter: Hasihin Sanawi
- Main venue: Bukit Jalil National Stadium
- Website: 2017 ASEAN Para Games

The 2017 ASEAN Para Games (Malay: Sukan Para ASEAN 2017), officially known as the 9th ASEAN Para Games (Malay: Sukan Para ASEAN ke-9), was a Southeast Asian disabled multi-sport event held in Kuala Lumpur, Malaysia, 17 days after the 2017 Southeast Asian Games from 17 to 23 September 2017. This was the third time Malaysia host the ASEAN Para Games and its first time since 2009. Previously, Malaysia also hosted the inaugural games in 2001.

Around 1452 athletes participated at the event, which featured 369 events in 16 sports. It was opened by the Prime Minister of Malaysia, Najib Razak at the Bukit Jalil National Stadium.

The final medal tally was led by Indonesia, followed by host Malaysia and Thailand, while East Timor won its first ever ASEAN Para Games gold medals.

== Development and preparation ==
The Malaysia SEA Games Organising Committee (MASOC) is the governing body for the 2017 ASEAN Para Games. It was formed in 2015 to oversee the staging of the event.

=== Venues ===
2017 ASEAN Para Games host states

The 2017 ASEAN Para Games was held around the Klang Valley area, consists of Kuala Lumpur, Selangor, Putrajaya and Negeri Sembilan.

All the existing venues in Bukit Jalil National Sports Complex were upgraded while the velodrome, costed MYR 80 million was built in Nilai, Negeri Sembilan to host track cycling events and was completed on late March 2017 and opened on 26 May 2017. They were equipped with disabled-friendly facilities prior to the games.

A games village was not built, and like the Southeast Asian Games, a "village in the city" concept saw athletes and officials housed in 6 hotels in the area.

The 9th ASEAN Para Games had 17 venues for the games. 14 in Kuala Lumpur and 1 each in Selangor, Putrajaya and Negeri Sembilan respectively.

State	Competition Venue	Sports
Kuala Lumpur	KL Sports City
Kuala Lumpur	National Aquatic Centre	Swimming
Kuala Lumpur	Sintetic Turf Field	Archery
Kuala Lumpur	Bukit Jalil National Stadium	Athletics, Opening and closing ceremonies
Kuala Lumpur	Axiata Arena	Badminton
Kuala Lumpur	Malaysia National Hockey Stadium	Football 5-a-side
Kuala Lumpur	Field C	Football 7-a-side
Kuala Lumpur	Malaysian International Trade & Exhibition Centre (MITEC)
Kuala Lumpur	Hall 6	Boccia
Kuala Lumpur	Hall 4	Chess
Kuala Lumpur	Hall 8	Goalball
Kuala Lumpur	Hall 3	Powerlifting
Kuala Lumpur	Hall 7	Table tennis
Kuala Lumpur	Hall 11	Sitting volleyball
Kuala Lumpur	Hall 9 and 10	Wheelchair basketball
Kuala Lumpur	Others
Kuala Lumpur	National Tennis Centre, Jalan Duta	Wheelchair tennis
Selangor	Megalanes, Sunway Pyramid	Bowling
Putrajaya	Putrajaya	Cycling Road
Negeri Sembilan	Velodrom Nasional Malaysia	Cycling Track

=== Ticketing ===
On 4 July 2017, it was announced that no paid tickets are required for the ASEAN Para Games events and the entry to the games' venues is entirely free.

== The Games ==
=== Opening ceremony ===
The opening ceremony was held in Bukit Jalil National Stadium on 17 September 2017 at 20:17 MST (UTC+8) which highlighted aspects of disabled people overcoming challenges in life. The time 20:17 was chosen to start the opening ceremony to mark the year 2017, the year which Malaysia hosted the 9th ASEAN Para Games.

A minute of silence was held before the ceremony to mourn the passing of the 14th Yang di-Pertuan Agong and the 28th Sultan of Kedah, Sultan Abdul Halim and the victims of the 2017 Darul Quran Ittifaqiyah madrasa fire in Petaling Jaya. The ceremony begins with the arrival of the Prime Minister of Malaysia, Najib Razak and his wife Rosmah Mansor. The National Anthem of Malaysia, Negaraku was performed by Malaysian Armed Forces band as the national flag was raised. This was followed by the countdown projection, the video of several Malaysian children carrying the flags of the participating nations and the projection of the games logo on the stage centre. After that, the national flags of the participating nations, the ASEAN Para Sports Federation flag and the edition flag, were brought into the stadium to symbolise the welcoming of the participants by Malaysia, the games' host nation. "Rimau", the mascot of the Games then entered the stadium in a wheelchair after the Volunteers form the shape of the mascot's head as the projection of the mascot's head appears on the stage centre.

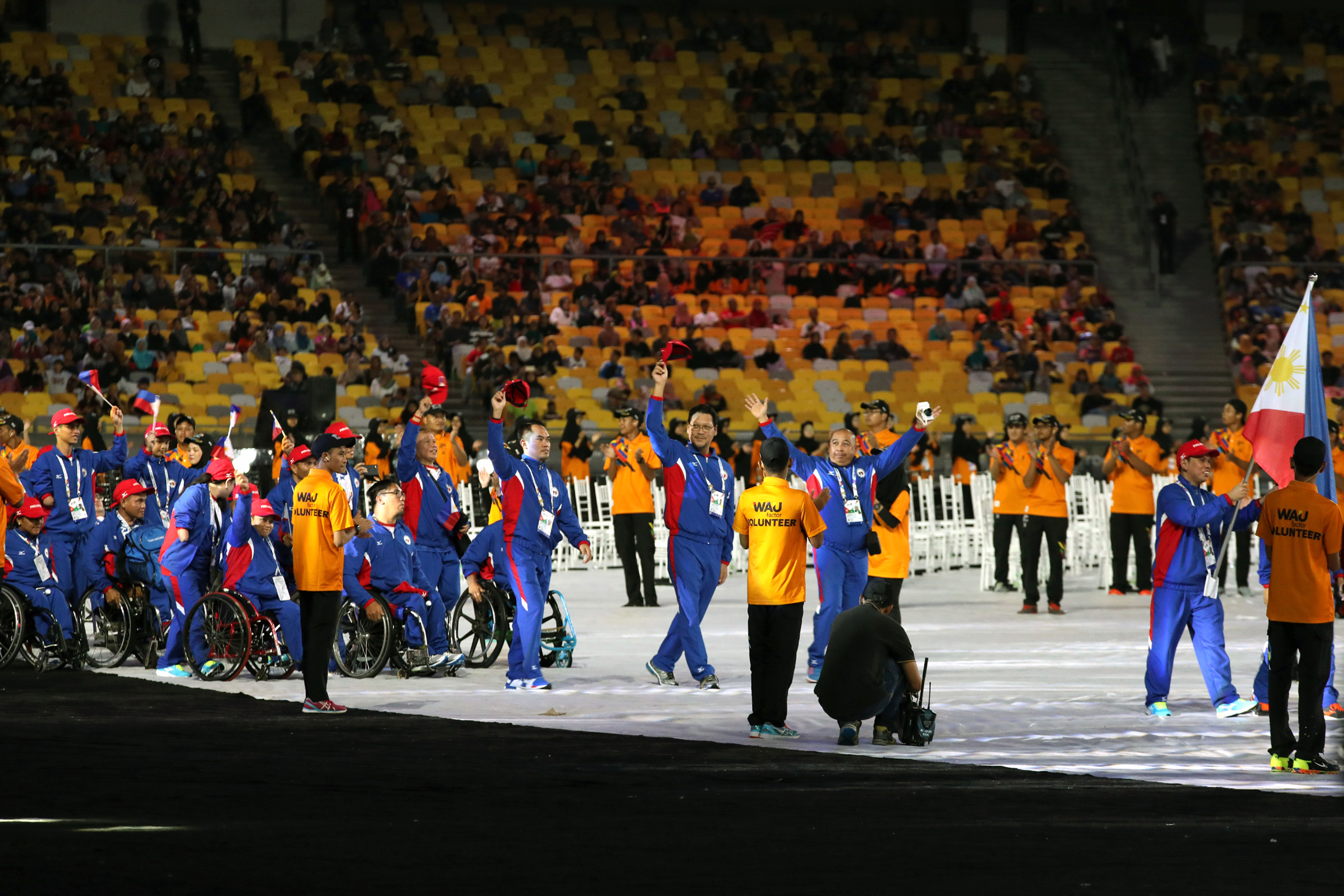
Parade of nations at the Opening ceremony of the 9th ASEAN Para Games.

Next, the parade of athletes from all 11 competing nations started with Brunei leading the field in alphabetical order and ended with the host nation, Malaysia entering the stadium last, led by two flagbearers who were gold medalists of the 2016 Summer Paralympics. A video featuring Malaysian notable Paralympic athletes and rapper Aman RA entitled I am Here was also shown.

Order	Nation	Flag bearer/s	Sport
1	Brunei (BRU)	Sahri bin Hj Jumaat	Athletics
2	Cambodia (CAM)	Yav Vannak	Swimming
3	Indonesia (INA)	Anto Boi	Powerlifting
4	Laos (LAO)	Pia	Powerlifting
5	Myanmar (MYA)	Si Thu Min	Table tennis
6	Philippines (PHI)	Menandro Junni Redor	Chess
7	Singapore (SGP)	Suhairi Bin Suhani	Athletics
8	Thailand (THA)	Wannaruemon Kewalin	Athletics
9	Timor-Leste (TLS)	Maria Julieta A Da Cruz	Boccia
10	Vietnam (VIE)	Le Van Cong	Powerlifting
11	Malaysia (MAS)	Muhammad Ziyad Zolkefli; Abdul Latif Romly	Athletics; Athletics

The 10-minute performance of the ceremony, We Are One told the story of the disabled people desire of integration into the society. It featured violin performance by Malaysian Para Swimmer and Violinist Yeo Yi Lin, sape performance by Alena Murang and Stephen Kayang, Bamboo flute performance by Ramlan Koyok and piano performance by Clarence Kang. Yuna makes her appearance at the stadium, performed the song, Rescue accompanied by performers and dancers on stage, from The Beautiful Gate Foundation, Malaysian Down Syndrome Society, United Voice Self Advocacy Society of Persons with Learning Disabilities Selangor & Kuala Lumpur, Pusat Penjagaan Kanak-Kanak Cacat Taman Megah and Farah Sulaiman Dancing Troupe. In keeping with tradition, welcoming speeches were given by the President of the ASEAN Para Sports Federation Osoth Bhavilai and Malaysia's Youth and Sports Minister Khairy Jamaluddin. The former and current Paralympic medalists, national sportsmen and sportswomen Mohamad Khasseri Othman, Perumal Mariappan, Nabilah Ahmad Sharif, Cheok Kon Fatt, Norhayati Sanoh, Siow Lee Chan, Felicia Mikat, Zul Amirul Sidi Abdullah, Hemala Devi Enikutty, Faridul Masri and Siti Nor Liasah Mohd Ariffin led the Royal Malaysian Navy Personnel who carried the Games Federation flag and the games edition flag into the stadium. The flags were then raised by the Navy personnel at the centre stage.

After that, Prime Minister Najib declared the games opened. Sharifah Raudzah Syed Akil took the oath for athletes, while Teo Kian Joo took the oath for the judges. The cauldron was lit by Hasihin Sanawi, 2012 Summer Paralympics Archery bronze medalist with support from Para cycling World championship bronze medalist Muhammad Afiq Afify, 2015 ASEAN Para Games athletics silver medalist Krishna Kumar Haridas, 2016 Summer Paralympics Bronze medalist Noor Radiah Ismail and 2015 ASEAN Para Games swimming gold medalist Fraidden Dawan. Hasihin lit the torch flame on the cauldron's segment which is suspended by wire, while Afify, Krishna, Noor and Fraidden move the pedal to push the segment towards the cauldron along the wire. The cauldron of the Games is similar to the 2017 Southeast Asian Games' cauldron. Its design was inspired by the traditional Malaysian oil torches used to welcome guests during festivals, and was to symbolise national unity. It had five spokes inscribed with the Rukun Negara and the colour gold served to honour Malaysia's monarch, as well as a nod to the highest award at the biennial games. The ceremony concluded with a colourful fireworks display erupted over the National Stadium, signalling the official commencement of the Games.

=== Closing ceremony ===
The closing ceremony was held in Bukit Jalil National Stadium on 23 September 2017 at 20:30 MST (UTC+8). Like the opening ceremony, the closing ceremony was directed by film director Saw Teong Hin alongside the Memories Entertainment creative team with co-operation from the Malaysian Armed Forces.

The ceremony begins with the arrival of the Deputy Prime Minister of Malaysia, Ahmad Zahid Hamidi. The National Anthem of Malaysia, Negaraku was performed by Malaysian Armed Forces band as the national flag was raised. Flags of the participating nations, the Federation flag and the Games edition flag were brought into the stadium. This was followed by the parade of athletes from 11 nations and Rimau entering the stage with Malaysia entering the stadium last. The parade of volunteers started with the volunteers dancing to Faizal Tahir's hit single, "Gemuruh", followed by a video shot of several volunteers and top para athletes and Minister of Youth and Sports, Khairy Jamaluddin. A cultural performance titled "Sama-sama", a sign of gratitude for Malaysia being given the opportunity to host the games, was presented.

Closing speeches were given by the President of the Malaysia Paralympic Council, SM Nasarudin SM Nasimuddin and ASEAN Para Sports Federation President, Osoth Bhavilai. Deputy Prime Minister of Malaysia Ahmad Zahid Hamidi then declared the 2017 ASEAN Para Games closed. A video about the participating athletes performing throughout the games, featuring some Malaysian sports medalists and their coaches with Jaclyn Victor and Vince Chong song, "Together We Rise" as background music, was played followed by the extinguishing of the cauldron and the lowering of the APSF flag by the Royal Malaysian Navy. The ASEAN Para Sports Federation flag was handed over from the Malaysian Paralympic Council President to the Philippines Paralympic Council President, Michael I. Barredo through Minister of the Youth and Sports of Malaysia, and APSF President. The National Anthem of the Philippines, Lupang Hinirang was played and the Philippines flag was raised, symbolising the hosting responsibilities being passed to Philippines. A video of the Philippines tourism featuring Philippines Para athletes was later shown. (Philippines would not be able to host the 2020 ASEAN Para Games due to the COVID-19 pandemic and hence, it was cancelled.) The ceremony concluded with a special concert by Yuna and fireworks erupted over the stadium, signalling the official conclusion of the games.

=== Participating nations ===
Some 1,452 athletes from all 11 ASEAN countries participated in the Games. East Timor returned to compete at the ASEAN Para Games after it last participated at the 2011 edition following the lifting of its suspension by the International Paralympic Committee.

- Brunei (27)
- Cambodia (75)
- Indonesia (192)
- Laos (50)
- Malaysia (331)
- Myanmar (120)
- Philippines (115)
- Singapore (92)
- Thailand (291)
- East Timor (14)
- Vietnam (150)

=== Sports ===
16 Para Sports with 369 events have been included in the games.

- Archery (6)
- Athletics (134)
- Badminton (14)
- Boccia (7)
- Bowling (18)
- Chess (24)
- Cycling (26)
  - Road (12)
  - Track (14)
- Football 5-a-side (1)
- Football 7-a-side (1)
- Goalball (2)
- Powerlifting (19)
- Sitting volleyball (1)
- Swimming (84)
- Table tennis (27)
- Wheelchair basketball (2)
- Wheelchair tennis (3)

=== Calendar ===
OC	Opening ceremony	●	Event competitions	1	Gold medal events	CC	Closing ceremony

September	17 Sun	18 Mon	19 Tue	20 Wed	21 Thu	22 Fri	23 Sat	Events
Ceremonies	OC						CC	
Archery			●	2	2	2		6
Athletics		24	28	30	27	25		134
Badminton		●	●	●	●	14		14
Boccia		●	●	3	●	4		7
Bowling			7	7	2	2		18
Chess		●	●	12	●	12		24
Cycling	7	5		7	7			26
Football 5-a-side		●	●	●		1		1
Football 7-a-side		●	●	●	●	1		1
Goalball	●	●	●	●	●	●	2	2
Powerlifting		4	5	5	5			19
Swimming		20	15	17	22	10		84
Table tennis	●	●	●	10	1	1	15	27
Sitting volleyball		●	●	●		1		1
Wheelchair basketball		●	●	●	●	2		2
Wheelchair tennis		●	●	●	3			3
Daily medal events	7	53	55	93	69	75	17	369
Cumulative total	7	60	115	208	277	352	369	369
September	17 Sun	18 Mon	19 Tue	20 Wed	21 Thu	22 Fri	23 Sat	Total events

=== Medal table ===
The 2017 ASEAN Para Games featured 369 events, resulting in 369 medal sets to be distributed.

Two bronze medals were awarded in most events in racket sports: 11 in Badminton, 18 in Table tennis and 3 in Wheelchair tennis. Furthermore, there was a third-place tie in the Bowling mixed doubles TPB8+TPB8 event, giving a total of 33 additional bronze medals. On the other hand, 7 silver and 28 bronze medals were not awarded in 28 events in 6 sports competed at the games due to few number of participants. These are: Athletics (2 silver and 9 bronze), Boccia (1 bronze), Cycling (2 silver and 4 bronze), Powerlifting (1 silver and 5 bronze), Swimming (2 silver and 7 bronze) and Table tennis (2 bronze).

As a result, a total of 1105 medals comprising 369 gold medals, 362 silver medals and 374 bronze medals were awarded to athletes.

The Host Malaysia's performance was their third best in ASEAN Para Games History and was second behind Indonesia as overall Champion. Meanwhile, despite small contingent size, East Timor managed to win its first ever ASEAN Para Games gold medals, all 2 of them are from athletics.

* Host nation (Host nation)

Rank	Nation	Gold	Silver	Bronze	Total
1	Indonesia	126	75	50	251
2	Malaysia*	90	85	83	258
3	Thailand	68	73	95	236
4	Vietnam	40	61	60	161
5	Philippines	20	20	29	69
6	Myanmar	11	15	17	43
7	Singapore	10	18	24	52
8	Brunei	2	6	6	14
9	Timor-Leste	2	0	1	3
10	Cambodia	0	5	5	10
11	Laos	0	4	4	8
Totals (11 entries)		369	362	374	1,105

Source: 2017 ASEAN Para Games Medal Standings

== Live Broadcasting ==
The organiser hosted the live video stream at its YouTube channel for the opening and closing ceremonies and 5 sport events namely, Swimming, Cycling, Powerlifting, Athletics and Wheelchair Action Live Broadcasting basketball. An official mobile application for the games was also released which featured live streams of selected sports events, schedules, results and other promotional materials. Radio Televisyen Malaysia (RTM TV1) and People's Television Network (PTV-4) serves as the official broadcaster of the games in Malaysia and the Philippines respectively.

== See also ==
- 2017 Southeast Asian Games

Preceded by Singapore	ASEAN Para Games; Kuala Lumpur; IX ASEAN Para Games (2017)	Succeeded by Philippines cancelled due to the COVID-19 pandemic
