= India at the 2014 Asian Para Games =

- IOC code: IND
- NPC: Paralympic Committee of India
- Website: paralympicindia.org.in

in Incheon 18–24 October 2014
- Competitors: 87
- Medals Ranked 15th: Gold 3 Silver 14 Bronze 16 Total 33

Asian Para Games appearances (overview)
- 2010; 2014; 2018; 2022

== Competitors ==
Sport	Men	Women	Total
Archery	6	2	8
Athletics	36	4	40
Badminton	7	1	8
Judo	4	3	7
Swimming	4	0	5
Shooting	1	0	1
Powerlifting	2	1	3
Table tennis	8	5	12
Wheelchair fencing	2	0	2
Total	70	16	86

== Medalists ==
Medal	Name	Sport	Event
Gold	Amit Kumar Saroha	Athletics	Club Throw – F31/32/51
Gold	Sharad Kumar	Athletics	Men's High Jump – T42/44/47
Gold	Parul Parmar	Badminton	Women's Singles SL 3
Silver	Sandeep Singh Maan	Athletics	Men 200m – T47
Silver	Amit Kumar Saroha	Athletics	Men Discus Throw – F51/52/53
Silver	Devendra Jhajharia	Athletics	Men's Javelin Throw – F46
Silver	Ramkiaran Singh	Athletics	Men 800m – T13
Silver	Sharath Gayakwad	Swimming	Men's 200m Individual Medley SM8
Silver	Narender Ranbir	Athletics	Men's Javelin Throw – F42/44
Silver	Deepa Malik	Athletics	Women's Javelin Throw – F53/54
Silver	Manoj Sarkar	Badminton	Men's Singles SL 3
Silver	Tarun Dhillon	Badminton	Men's Singles SL 4
Silver	Raj Kumar; Rakesh Pandey	Badminton	Men's Doubles SU5
Silver	Raj Kumar; Parul Parmar	Badminton	Mixed Doubles SL 3–SU 5
Silver	Ankur Dhama	Athletics	Men's 800m – T11
Silver	Sandeep Singh Maan	Athletics	Men's 400m – T47
Silver	Santhamuthuvel Kesavan	Athletics	Men's Discus Throw – F44
Bronze	Ankur Dhama	Athletics	Men's 1500m – T11
Bronze	Ankur Dhama	Athletics	Men's 5000m – T11
Bronze	Farman Basha	Powerlifting	Men 49kg
Bronze	Girisha Nagarajegowda	Athletics	Men's High Jump – T42/44/47
Bronze	Sharath Gayakwad	Swimming	Men's 100m Butterfly S8
Bronze	Sharath Gayakwad	Swimming	Men's 100m Breaststroke SB8
Bronze	Karamjyoti Dalal	Athletics	Women's Discus Throw – F55/56
Bronze	Pramod Bhagat	Badminton	Men's Singles SL 3
Bronze	Prasanta Karmakar	Swimming	Men's 100m Breaststroke SB9
Bronze	Karamjyoti Dalal	Athletics	Woman Shot Put – F55/56
Bronze	Shavaad Jedikere	Athletics	Men's 800m – T11
Bronze	Karmpal; Jaydeep Singh; Manoharan Janakiraman; Ramesh Kumar	Judo	Men Team
Bronze	Vijayashanthi Ravi; Priyanka Ghumre; Pappathi Chinnaswamy	Judo	Women's Team
Bronze	Sharath Gayakwad	Swimming	Men's 50m Freestyle S8
Bronze	India	Swimming	Men's 4x100 Relay Medley 34P
Bronze	Sharath Gayakwad	Swimming	Men's 100m Backstroke S8

Medals by sport
Sport	gold	silver	bronze	Total
Athletics	2	9	6	17
Badminton	1	4	1	6
Swimming	0	1	6	7
Judo	0	0	2	2
Powerlifting	0	0	1	1
Total	3	14	16	33

== Archery ==
Compound

Athletes	Event	Qualification Rank	Round of 16	Quarterfinal	Semi-final	Final / BM	Rank
Athletes	Event	Qualification Rank	Opposition Result	Opposition Result	Opposition Result	Opposition Result	Rank
Satendr Mirey	Men's Individual	20	Terasaka (JPN); L 129–137	Did Not Advance			
Vilas Dawane	Men's Individual	22	Otsuka (JPN); L 132–136	Did Not Advance			
Tarif	Men's Individual	15	Aikynbayev (KAZ); W 132–131	Shin D-h (KOR); L 115–143	Did Not Advance		

Recurve

Athletes	Event	Qualification Rank	Round of 32	Round of 16	Quarterfinal	Semi-final	Final	Rank
Athletes	Event	Qualification Rank	Opposition Result	Opposition Result	Opposition Result	Opposition Result	Opposition Result	Rank
Amol Boriwale	Men's Individual	28	Bye	Netsiri (THA); L 0–6	Did Not Advance			
Rajesh Kumar	Men's Individual	27	Bye	Kazem (IRQ); W 6–4	Ueyama (JPN); W 6–0	Zhao Lx (CHN); L 0–6	Did Not Advance	
Jyoti Baliyan	Women individual	16	—N/a	Tuwariyah (INA); W 6–0	Nemati (IRI); L 0–6	Did Not Advance		
Jyoti Baliyan; Rajesh Kumar	Mixed Team	9	Bye	Tseng L-h / Hsieh M-y (TPE); L 5–3	Did Not Advance			

== Athletics ==
=== Men ===
Track

Athletes	Event	Heats		Semi-final		Final	
Athletes	Event	Result	Rank	Result	Rank	Result	Rank
Shavaad Jedikere	400m – T11	57.13 PB	3	did not advance			
Shavaad Jedikere	800m – T11	2:13.69 SB	3 Q	—N/a		2:14.79	3rd place, bronze medalist(s)
Ankur Dhama	800m – T11	2:13.56	1 Q	—N/a		2:09.11 PB	2nd place, silver medalist(s)
Ankur Dhama	5000m – T11	—N/a				16: 42.69	3rd place, bronze medalist(s)
Amar Nishad	800m – T12	2:09.02 PB	2 Q	—N/a		2:06.74 PB	4
Amar Nishad	1500m – T12	4:14.54 PB	1 Q	—N/a		DNF	
Ramkiaran Singh	800m – T13	—N/a				2:01.06 PB	2nd place, silver medalist(s)
Rajesh Kumar	200m – T44	—N/a				29.45	8
Anandan Gunasekaran	200m – T44	—N/a				25.94	6
Amit Kumar	100m – T47	11.85 PB	4	—N/a		did not advance	
Sandeep Singh Maan	100m – T47	11.51 PB	3 q	—N/a		11.82	6
Sandeep Singh Maan	200m – T47	—N/a				22.59 PB	2nd place, silver medalist(s)
Sandeep Singh Maan	400m – T47	51.04 GR	1 Q	—N/a		49.28 PB	2nd place, silver medalist(s)

Field

Athletes	Event	Final	
Athletes	Event	Result	Rank
Amit Kumar Saroha	Club Throw – F31/32/51	21.31 AR	1st place, gold medalist(s)
Amit Kumar Saroha	Discus Throw – F51/52/53	9.89 GR	2nd place, silver medalist(s)
Sharad Kumar	High Jump – T42/44/47	1.80 GR	1st place, gold medalist(s)
Girisha Nagarajegowda	High Jump – T42/44/47	1.68	3
Varun Singh Bhati	High Jump – T42/44/47	1.65	5
Narender Ranbir	Javelin Throw – F42/44	53.56 PB	2nd place, silver medalist(s)
Prasanna Thippeswamy	Javelin Throw – F42/44	46.39 PB	4
Vinod Kumar	Javelin Throw – F42/44	48.40 PB	6
Devendra Jhajharia	Javelin Throw – F46	58.45	2nd place, silver medalist(s)
Jaideep Deswal	Discus Throw – F42	37.48	4
Surjeet Singh	Discus Throw – F42	31.79 SB	6
Santhamuthuvel Kesavan	Discus Throw – F44	39.70	2nd place, silver medalist(s)
Amit Balyan	Discus Throw – F54/55	27.81	4
Sunil Phogat	Discus Throw – F54/55	27.53 PB	5
Prasantha Kumar	Discus Throw – F54/55	14.85 PB	9

=== Women ===
Field

Athletes	Event	Final	
Athletes	Event	Result	Rank
Pragya Ghildial	Discus Throw – F55 / 56	12.45 PB	10
Deepa Malik	Javelin Throw – F53/54	9.66 AR	2nd place, silver medalist(s)
Karamjyoti Dalal	Shot Put – F55/56	5.36 PB	3rd place, bronze medalist(s)
Karamjyoti Dalal	Discus Throw – F55 / 56	17.37 PB	3rd place, bronze medalist(s)

== Badminton ==
=== Singles ===
Men

Athlete	Event	Group stage				Round of 16	Quarterfinal	Semifinal	Final	
Athlete	Event	Opposition Result	Opposition Result	Opposition Result	Rank	Opposition Result	Opposition Result	Opposition Result	Opposition Result	Rank
Manoj Sarkar	SL 3	Fujihara (JPN); W (21–14, 21–19)	Rukaendi (INA); L (18–21, 21–23)	—N/a	2 Q	Suenaga (JPN); W (21–6, 21–9)	Juhari (MAS); W (21–13, 21–13)	Bhagat (IND); W (21–16, 19–21, 21–18)	Rukaendi (INA); L (14–21, 15–21)	2nd place, silver medalist(s)
Pramod Bhagat	SL 3	Hermogenes (PHI); W (21–15, 21–17)	Hiroi (JPN); W (21–13, 21–9)	—N/a	1 Q	Malek (MAS); W(21–18, 21–18)	Dwiyoko (INA); W (21–12, 16–21, 21–15)	Sarkar (IND); L (16–21, 21–19, 18–21)	Did Not Advance	3rd place, bronze medalist(s)
Ananda Boregowda	SL 4	Byeon J-b (KOR); W (21–12, 21–16)	Lin C-c (TPE); L (15–21, 16–21)	—N/a	2 Q	—N/a	Setiawan (INA); L (14–21, 20–22)	Did Not Advance		
Tarun Dhillon	SL 4	Setiawan (INA); L (19–21, 13–21)	Nguyễn V T (VIE); W (21–13, 21–13)	—N/a	2 Q	—N/a	Susanto (INA); W (19–21, 21–14, 21–12)	Lin C-c (TPE); W (17–21, 21–13, 21–14)	Setiawan (INA); L (20–22, 18–21)	2nd place, silver medalist(s)
Ashutosh Dubey	SL 4	Susanto (INA); L (10–21, 15–21)	Lê V (VIE); W (21–11, 21–18)	Kittichokwattana (THA); L (16–21, 21–16, 13–21)	3	—N/a	Did Not Advance			
Raj Kumar	SU 5	Obara (JPN); W (21–14, 21–16)	Khowbunyarasri (THA); W (21–9, 21–17)	—N/a	1 Q	Bye	Kunantoro (INA); L (21–16, 20–22, 9–21)	Did Not Advance		
Rakesh Pandey	SU 5	Kawabata (JPN); L (9–21, 6–21)	Lam T K (HKG); L (11–21, 9–21)	Shi Sz (CHN); L (8–21, 12–21)	4	Did Not Advance				

Women

Athlete	Event	Group stage				
Athlete	Event	Opposition Result	Opposition Result	Opposition Result	Opposition Result	Rank
Parul Parmar	SL 3	Ng L L (HKG); W (21–4, 21–7)	Panyachaem (THA); W (21–4, 21–10)	Ito (JPN); W (21–3, 21–11)	Kamtam (THA); W (21–13, 21–17)	1st place, gold medalist(s)

=== Doubles ===
Athlete	Event	Group stage				Quarterfinal	Semifinal	Final	
Athlete	Event	Opposition Result	Opposition Result	Opposition Result	Rank	Opposition Result	Opposition Result	Opposition Result	Rank
Ananda Boregowda; Pramod Bhagat	Men's SL 3–4	Fujihara / Sato (JPN); W (18–21, 21–15, 21–12)	Juhari / Saaba (MAS); L (24–26, 13–21)	Baik D-k / Kim C-m (KOR); L (21–19, 12–21, 13–21)	3	Did Not Advance			
Manoj Sarkar; Tarun Dhillon	Men's SL 3–4	Saengarayakul / Sangnil (THA); W (21–10, 21–10)	Dwiyoko / Setiawan (INA); L (19–21, 13–21)	—N/a	2 Q	Rukaendi / Susanto (INA); L (13–21, 12–21)	Did Not Advance		
Raj Kumar; Rakesh Pandey	Men's SU 5	Phạm H T / Trần M N (VIE); W (21–11, 21–11)	Kawabata / Shogaki (JPN); W (21–18, 21–17)	Lee M-y / Yeh E-c (TPE); W (21–19, 18–21, 21–19)	1 Q	Tay W M / Pung (SIN); W (17–21, 21–3, 21–11)	Kunantoro / Nugroho (INA); W (21–17, 21–15)	Cheah L H / Laiman (MAS); L (21–11, 11–21, 13–21)	2nd place, silver medalist(s)
Raj Kumar; Parul Parmar	Mixed SL 3–SU 5	Setiawan / Oktila (INA); L (12–21, 10–21)	Kittichokwattana / Saensupa (THA); W (21–11, 21–18)	Suenaga / Toyoda (JPN); W (21–18, 21–18)	2 Q	—N/a	Shogaki / Ito (JPN); W (21–16, 21–15)	Setiawan / Oktila (INA); L (14–21, 15–21)	2nd place, silver medalist(s)

== Judo ==
Men

Athletes	Event	Qualifying Round	Quarterfinal	Semi-final	Repechage	Final / BM	Rank
Athletes	Event	Opposition Result	Opposition Result	Opposition Result	Opposition Result	Final / BM	Rank
Karmpal	Men −60 kg	—N/a	Namozov (UZB); L 000–100	Did Not Advance			
Jaydeep Singh	Men −66 kg	Berdiyorov (UZB); L 000–100	Did Not Advance				
Manoharan Janakiraman	Men −73 kg	—N/a	Sayidov (UZB); L 000–100	Did Not Advance			
Ramesh Kumar	Men −90 kg	—N/a	Dashtseren (MGL); L 000–100	Did Not Advance	Lkhagvadorj (MGL); L 000–100	Did Not Advance	
Karmpal; Jaydeep Singh; Manoharan Janakiraman; Ramesh Kumar	Men Team	—N/a	Bye	Mongolia (MGL); L 1–4	—N/a	Did Not Advance	3rd place, bronze medalist(s)

Women

Athletes	Event	Quarterfinal	Semi-final	Repechage	Final / BM	Rank
Athletes	Event	Opposition Result	Opposition Result	Opposition Result	Final / BM	Rank
Vijayashanthi Ravi	Woman −48 kg	Baasandorj (MGL); L 000–101	Did Not Advance	Janudom (THA); L 000–110	Did Not Advance	

Athletes	Event	Group Stage			Rank
Athletes	Event	Opposition Result	Opposition Result	Opposition Result	Rank
Priyanka Ghumre	Woman −57 kg	Miwa (JPN); L 000–100	Wang Lj (CHN); L 000–100	—N/a	3 [no medal]
Pappathi Chinnaswamy	Woman −78 kg	Nantharak (THA); L 000–100	Nyamaa (MGL); L 000–100	—N/a	3 [no medal]
Vijayashanthi Ravi; Priyanka Ghumre; Pappathi Chinnaswamy	Women's Team	China (CHN); W 3–1	Indonesia (INA); L 1–2	Mongolia (MGL); L 0–3	3rd place, bronze medalist(s)

== Swimming ==
Men

Athletes	Event	Heats		Semi-final		Final	
Athletes	Event	Result	Rank	Result	Rank	Result	Rank
Niranjan Mukundan	100m Butterfly S8	—N/a				DSQ	
Sharath Gayakwad	100m Butterfly S8	—N/a				1:08.30	3rd place, bronze medalist(s)
Sharath Gayakwad	100m Backstroke S8	1:22.33	4	—N/a		1:15.34	3rd place, bronze medalist(s)
Sharath Gayakwad	100m Breaststroke SB8	1 21.06	1 Q	—N/a		1:18.43	3rd place, bronze medalist(s)
Sharath Gayakwad	200m Individual Medley SM8	—N/a				2:38.71	2nd place, silver medalist(s)
Niranjan Mukundan	200m Individual Medley SM8	—N/a				3:20.79	4
Niranjan Mukundan	50m freestyle S8	34.56	6	—N/a		Did Not Advance	
Sharath Gayakwad	50m freestyle S8	32.76	3	—N/a		30.64	3rd place, bronze medalist(s)
Prasanta Karmakar	100m Breaststroke SB9	—N/a				1:22.07	3rd place, bronze medalist(s)
Swapnil Patil	100m Breaststroke SB9	—N/a				1:35.45	7
Shashank Mahesh	100m Breaststroke SB14	1:58:04	6	Did Not Advance			
Shashank Mahesh	100m Breaststroke S14	DSQ		Did Not Advance			
India	4x100 Relay Medley 34P	—N/a				23.32	3rd place, bronze medalist(s)

== Shooting ==
Men

Athlete	Event	Qualification	Final	Rank
Naresh Kumar Sharma	R1-10m Air Rifle Standing	Did not qualify	Did Not Advance	

== Powerlifting ==
Athlete	Event	Best Lift	Rank
Farman Basha	Men's −49 kg	155	3rd place, bronze medalist(s)
Rajinder Singh Rahelu	Men's – 55 kg	NM	
Sakina Khatun	Women's −50 kg	81	4

== Table tennis ==
Men

Athletes	Event	Group stage					Round of 16	Quarterfinal	Semifinal	Final	
Athletes	Event	Opposition Result	Opposition Result	Opposition Result	Opposition Result	Rank	Opposition Result	Opposition Result	Opposition Result	Opposition Result	Rank
Nir Bahadur Gurung	Individual TT3	Ko H Y (HKG); L 0–3	Yoshida (JPN); L 0–3	—N/a		3	Did Not Advance				
Trivendra Singh	Individual TT4	Zhang Y (CHN); L 0–3	Chaiwut (THA); L 0–3	Cartera (PHI); L 0–3	—N/a	4	—N/a	Did Not Advance			
Yezdi Bhamgara	Individual TT6	Huang Jx (CHN); L 0–3	Thainiyom (THA); L 0–3	Jon J-h (PRK); L 0–3	—N/a	4	—N/a		Did Not Advance		
Ajay Gubbi	Individual TT8	Kim K-j (KOR); L 0–3	Hu Mf (TPE); L 1–3	Charitsat (THA); L 1–3	—N/a	4	Did Not Advance				
Ranjit Gujjar	Individual TT9	Wong C Y (HKG); L 0–3	Suzuki (JPN); L 0–3	Ma Y-c (PRK); L 0–3	—N/a	4	—N/a	Did Not Advance			
Om Lotlikar	Individual TT10	Lee Y-t (TPE); L 0–3	Akbar (INA); L 0–3	Pitiyage (SRI); L 0–3	—N/a	4	Did Not Advance				
Nir Bahadur Gurung; Trivendra Singh	Team TT4	Philippines (PHI); L 1–3	South Korea (KOR); L 0–3	Thailand (THA); L 0–3	Chinese Taipei (TPE); L 0–3	5	—N/a				5
Yezdi Bhamgara; Ajay Gubbi	Team TT8	China (CHN); L 0–3	Indonesia (INA); L 0–3	Thailand (THA); L 0–3	—N/a	4	—N/a		Did Not Advance		
Ranjit Gujjar; Om Lotlikar	Team TT9/10	Malaysia (MAS); L 0–3	Japan (JPN); L 0–3	Mongolia (MGL); W 3–2	—N/a	3	—N/a	Did Not Advance			

Women

Athletes	Event	Group stage				Quarterfinal	Semifinal	Final	
Athletes	Event	Opposition Result	Opposition Result	Opposition Result	Rank	Opposition Result	Opposition Result	Opposition Result	Rank
Sonal Patel	Individual TT3	Li Qa (CHN); L 0–3	Chazani (IRI); W 3–1	—N/a	2 Q	Asayut (THA); L 0–3	Did Not Advance		
Bhavina Patel	Individual TT4	El Elimat (JOR); W 3–0	Zhou Y (CHN); L 0–3	—N/a	2 Q	Zhang M (CHN); L 0–3	Did Not Advance		
Suvarna Raj	Individual TT5	Abuawad (JOR); L 0–3	Jung Y-a (KOR); L 0–3	Wong P Y (HKG); L 0–3	4	—N/a	Did Not Advance		
Poonam	Individual TT6-7	Kim S-o (KOR); L 0–3	Lam O M (MAC); L 0–3	—N/a	3	—N/a	Did Not Advance		
Vaishnavi Sutar	Individual TT8	Mao Jd (CHN); L 0–3	Koh D-j (KOR); L 0–3	—N/a	3	—N/a	Did Not Advance		
Nikita Kumar	Individual TT9-10	Lei Ln (CHN); L 0–3	Settisrikoedkun (THA); L 2–3	—N/a	3	Did Not Advance			
Sonal Patel; Bhavina Patel; Suvarna Raj	Team TT4/5	China (CHN); L 0–3	Chinese Taipei (TPE); L 1–3	—N/a	3	—N/a	Did Not Advance		
Poonam; Vaishnavi Sutar	Team TT6-8	South Korea (KOR); L 0–3	China (CHN); L 0–3	Macau (MAC); L 0–3	3	—N/a			3 (no medal)

== Wheelchair fencing ==
Men

Athlete	Event	Round of 16	Quarter Final	Semi-final	Final	
Athlete	Event	Opposition Result	Opposition Result	Opposition Result	Opposition Result	Rank
Joseph Jelestin	Sabre-Category A	Chan W K (HKG); L 2–15	Did Not Advance			13
Nooruddin Dawood	Sabre-Category B	Semaan (LIB); W 15–2	Tam C S (HKG); L 4–15	Did Not Advance		8
