= Indonesia at the 2014 Asian Para Games =

- IOC code: INA
- NPC: National Paralympic Committee of Indonesia

in Incheon 18–24 October 2014
- Competitors: 67 in 9 sports
- Medals Ranked 9th: Gold 9 Silver 11 Bronze 18 Total 38

Asian Para Games appearances (overview)
- 2010; 2014; 2018; 2022

Youth appearances
- 2009; 2013; 2017; 2021

Indonesia participated in the 2014 Asian Para Games the second edition of Asian Para Games in Incheon, South Korea from 18 to 24 October 2014. Indonesia will compete in 9 sports such as archery, athletic, badminton, powerlifting, swimming, ten-pin bowling, table tennis, wheelchair rugby and wheelchair tennis.

== Competitors ==
Sport	Total
Archery	2
Athletics	14
Badminton	12
Powerlifting	6
Swimming	9
Table tennis	12
Ten-pin bowling	2
Wheelchair rugby	6
Wheelchair tennis	4
Total	67

== Medal summary ==
=== Medal by sport ===
Medals by sport
Sport	1st place, gold medalist(s)	2nd place, silver medalist(s)	3rd place, bronze medalist(s)	Total
Athletics	0	2	7	9
Badminton	4	3	4	11
Powerlifting	0	1	3	4
Swimming	3	4	1	8
Table tennis	2	1	3	6
Total	9	11	18	38

=== Medal by Date ===
Medals by date
Day	Date	1st place, gold medalist(s)	2nd place, silver medalist(s)	3rd place, bronze medalist(s)	Total
1	19 Oct	0	2	0	2
2	20 Oct	0	2	3	5
3	21 Oct	0	0	4	4
4	22 Oct	4	1	5	10
5	23 Oct	5	4	5	14
6	24 Oct	0	2	1	3
Total		9	11	18	38

=== Medalists ===
Medal	Name	Sport	Event	Date
Gold	Agus Susanto	Table tennis	Men's Singles - TT5	22 Oct
Gold	Dian David Mickael Jacobs	Table tennis	Men's Singles - TT10	22 Oct
Gold	Mulyana	Swimming	Men's 50 m Freestyle S4	22 Oct
Gold	Marinus Melianus Yowei	Swimming	Men's 100 m Breaststroke SB13	22 Oct
Gold	Fredy Setiawan	Badminton	Men's Singles - SL4	23 Oct
Gold	Mulyana	Swimming	Men's 50 m Butterfly S4	23 Oct
Gold	Ukun Rukaendi	Badminton	Men's Singles - SL3	23 Oct
Gold	Leani Ratri Oktila; Fredy Setiawan	Badminton	Mixed Doubles - SL3,4	23 Oct
Gold	Hary Susanto; Ukun Rukaendi	Badminton	Men's Doubles - SL3,4	23 Oct
Silver	Ni Nengah Widiasih	Powerlifting	Women's -41 kg	19 Oct
Silver	Marinus Melianus Yowei	Swimming	Men's 50 m Freestyle S13	19 Oct
Silver	Mulyana	Swimming	Men's 50 m Backstroke S4	20 Oct
Silver	Marinus Melianus Yowei	Swimming	Men's 100 m Freestyle S13	20 Oct
Silver	Khalimatus Sadiyah; Leani Ratri Oktila	Badminton	Women's Doubles - SL3,4/SU5	22 Oct
Silver	Oddie Kurnia Dwi Listyanto	Badminton	Men's Singles - SU5	23 Oct
Silver	Dwiyoko; Fredy Setiawan	Badminton	Men's Doubles - SL3,4	23 Oct
Silver	Tangkilisan Steven Sualang	Swimming	Men's 100 m Backstroke S10	23 Oct
Silver	Setiyo Budihartanto; Marthin Losu; Wagiyo; Rasyidi	Athletics	Men's 4 × 100 m T42-47	23 Oct
Silver	Wagiyo	Athletics	Men's 400 m T44	24 Oct
Silver	Komet Akbar; Dian David Mickael Jacobs	Table tennis	Men's Team - TT9/10	24 Oct
Bronze	Setiyo Budihartanto	Athletics	Men's Long Jump T47	20 Oct
Bronze	Rani Puji Astuti	Powerlifting	Women's -50 kg	20 Oct
Bronze	Abdul Halim Dalimunte	Athletics	Men's 100 m T11	20 Oct
Bronze	Rahayu	Powerlifting	Women's -67 kg	21 Oct
Bronze	Ajang Abidin	Table tennis	Men's Singles - TT7	21 Oct
Bronze	Komet Akbar	Table tennis	Men's Singles - TT10	21 Oct
Bronze	Sella Dewi Radayana	Table tennis	Women's Singles - TT9/10	21 Oct
Bronze	Imam Kunantoro	Badminton	Men's Singles - SU5	22 Oct
Bronze	Suryo Nugroho	Badminton	Men's Singles - SU5	22 Oct
Bronze	Imam Kunantoro; Suryo Nugroho	Badminton	Men's Doubles - SL3,4/SU5	22 Oct
Bronze	Leani Ratri Oktila	Badminton	Women's Singles - SL4/SU5	22 Oct
Bronze	Agus Ngaimin	Swimming	Men's 100 m Backstroke S6	22 Oct
Bronze	Ni Nengah Widiasih	Powerlifting	Women's -79 kg	23 Oct
Bronze	Sunoto	Athletics	Men's 200 m T11	23 Oct
Bronze	Rasyidi	Athletics	Men's 100 m T44	23 Oct
Bronze	Harjono Tarihoran; Sunoto; I Nyoman Oka; Abdul Halim Dalimunte	Athletics	Men's 4 × 100 m T11-13	23 Oct
Bronze	Alan Sastra	Athletics	Men's Discus Throw - F57	23 Oct
Bronze	Sunoto	Athletics	Men's 400 m T11	24 Oct

Last updated 23 October 2014

== Athletics ==
Men

Athletes	Event	Heat		Final	
Athletes	Event	Result	Rank	Result	Rank
Alan Sastra	Shot Put F57			10.41 m	7
Alan Sastra	Javelin Throw F57			34.51 m	7
Alan Sastra	Discus Throw F57			41.23 m PB	3rd place, bronze medalist(s)
I Nyoman Oka	Javelin Throw F12/13			35.77 m	8
I Nyoman Oka	Men's 100 m - T12	12.64	4	did not advance	
Mulyono	Long Jump T42/44			4.73 m + 0.8	7
Rasyidi	Long Jump T42/44			5.26 m - 0.7	8
Rasyidi	Men's 100 m - T44	12.40	2 Q	12.45	3rd place, bronze medalist(s)
Rasyidi	Men's 200 m - T44	26.13	3 Q	25.85	5
Marthin Losu	Men's 100 m - T47	11.22 GR PB	1 Q	11.47	4
Marthin Losu	Men's 200 m - T47	23.24	3 Q	23.34	7
Marthin Losu	Men's400 m - T47	Disqualified			
Abdul Halim Dalimunte	Men's 100m - T11	11.97	2	12.05	3rd place, bronze medalist(s)
Abdul Halim Dalimunte	Men's 200m - T11	24.71	1 Q	24.87	4
Sunoto	Men's 200m - T11	24.50	2 Q	24.78	3rd place, bronze medalist(s)
Sunoto	Men's 400m - T11	56.47	2 Q	56.06	3rd place, bronze medalist(s)
Harjono Tarihoran	Men's 200 m - T12	24.47	3	did not advance	
Harjono Tarihoran	Men's 400m - T12	55.09	3	did not advance	
Doni Yulianto	Men's 400 m - T54	58.63	7	did not advance	
Doni Yulianto	Men's 100 m - T54	16.64	4 Q	16.87	7
Doni Yulianto	Men's 800 m - T54	Disqualified			
Setiyo Budihartanto	Long jump - T47			6.41 m	3rd place, bronze medalist(s)
Setiyo Budihartanto	Men's 100 m - T47	11.75	3	did not advance	
Erens Sabandar	Men's 1500 m T46			4:45.92	7
Erens Sabandar	Men's 800 m T36/46	2:15.42	5 Q	2:12.06	6
Rudiyanto	Men's 400 m - T47	1:00.17	6	did not advance	
Wagiyo	Men's 400 m - T44			58.68	2nd place, silver medalist(s)
Harjono Tarihoran; Sunoto; I Nyoman Oka; Abdul Halim Dalimunte	Men's 4 × 100 m - T11-13	46.15	1 Q	46.66	3rd place, bronze medalist(s)
Setiyo Budihartanto; Marthin Losu; Wagiyo; Rasyidi	Men's 4 × 100 m - T42-47			45.51	2nd place, silver medalist(s)

Women

Athletes	Event	Heat		Final	
Athletes	Event	Result	Rank	Result	Rank
Famini	Javelin Throw F55/56			12.10 m	8
Famini	Discus Throw F55/56			14.41 m	5
Famini	Shot Put F55/56			4.92	10

== Badminton ==
Men

Athlete	Event	Preliminary Round			Round of 16	Quarterfinals	Semifinals	Final	
Athlete	Event	Opposition Score	Opposition Score	Opposition Score	Opposition Score	Opposition Score	Opposition Score	Opposition Score	Rank
Budi Agus Utomo	Single WH 2	(1) Kim Kyung-hun (KOR); L 0-2 (10-21, 7-21)	Madzlan Saibon (MAS); L 0-2 (10-21, 10-21)			did not advance			
Sugeng Widodo	Single WH 2	(2) Kim Jung-jun (KOR); L 0-2 (7-21, 7-21)	Ip Chi Keong (MAC); W 2-0 (21-9, 21-9)			Kim Sung-hun (KOR); L 0-2 (14-21, 8-21)	did not advance		
Dwiyoko	Single SL 3	Hoang Pham Thang (VIE); W 2-0 (21-15, 21-7)	(3) Toshiaki Suenaga (JPN); W 2-0 (21-18, 21-14)		Bye	Pramod Bhagat (IND); L 1-2 (12-21, 21-16, 15-21)	did not advance		
Ukun Rukaendi	Single SL 3	Daisuke Fujihara (JPN); W 2-0 (21-11, 21-11)	(4) Manoj Sarkar (IND); W 2-0 (21-18, 23-21)		Bye	Huang Hsing-Chih (TPE); W 2-0 (21-15, 21-15)	(1) Pham Duc Trung (VIE); W 2-0 (21-15, 21-15)	(4) Manoj Sarkar (IND); W 2-0 (21-14, 21-15)	1st place, gold medalist(s)
Fredy Setiawan	Single SL 4	(2) Tarun (IND); W 2-0 (21-19, 21-13)	Nguyen van Thuong (VIE); W 2-0 (21-7, 21-14)			Ananda Kumar Boregowda (IND); W 2-0 (21-14, 22-20)	(3) Omar Bakri (MAS); W 2-0 (21-15, 22-16)	(2) Tarun (IND); W 2-0 (22-20, 21-18)	1st place, gold medalist(s)
Hary Susanto	Single SL 4	(4) Ashutosh Dubey (IND); W 2-0 (21-10, 21-15)	Chawarat Kittichokwattana (THA); W 2-0 (21-9, 21-13)	Ie van (VIE); W 2-0 (21-10, 21-13)		(2) Tarun (IND); L 1-2 (21-19, 14-21, 12-21)	did not advance		
Imam Kunantoro	Single SU 5	(1) Liek Hou Cheah (MAS); L 1-2(21-14, 8-21, 15-21)	Wong Shu Yuen (HKG); W 2-0 (21-9, 21-18)		Shi Shengzhuo (CHN); W 2-1 (21-15, 19-21, 21-17)	(3) Raj Kumar (IND); W 2-1 (16-21, 22-20, 21-9)	Oddie Kurnia Dwi Listyanto (INA); L 0-0 (3-5, Retired)	Did not advance	3rd place, bronze medalist(s)
Suryo Nugroho	Single SU 5	Lee Meng Yuan (TPE); W 2-0 (21-9, 21-9)	Tran Minh Nhuan (VIE); W 2-0 (21-0, 21-0)	(5) Kim Gi-yeon (KOR); W 2-0 (21-12, 21-18)	Lam Tak Kwan (HKG); W 2-0 (21-10, 21-12)	(4) Gen Shogaki (JPN); W 2-0 (21-15, 21-6)	(1) Liek Hou Cheah (MAS); L 0-2 (18-21, 13-21)	Did not advance	3rd place, bronze medalist(s)
Oddie Kurnia Dwi Listyanto	Single SU 5	Pham Hong Tuan (VIE); W 2-0 (21-14, 21-17)	(2) Tay Wei Ming (SIN); W 2-1 (16-21, 21-13, 21-18)		Bye	Pham Hong Tuan (VIE); W 2-0 (22-20, 21-12)	Imam Kunantoro (INA); W 0-0 (5-3, Retired)	(1) Liek Hou Cheah (MAS); L 0-2 (8-21, 11-21)	2nd place, silver medalist(s)
Hary Susanto; Ukun Rukaendi	Double SL 3, 4	Vietnam (VIE); W 2-0 (21-18, 21-11)	Thailand (THA); W 2-0 (21-7, 21-14)			India (IND); W 2-0 (21-13, 21-12)	Chinese Taipei (TPE); W 2-0 (21-14, 21-7)	Indonesia (INA); W 2-0 (21-15, 21-13)	1st place, gold medalist(s)
Dwiyoko; Fredy Setiawan	Double SL 3, 4	Thailand (THA); W 2-0 (21-12, 21-15)	India (IND); W 2-0 (21-19, 21-13)			Vietnam (VIE); W 2-0 (21-19, 21-8)	Malaysia (MAS); W 2-0 (21-16, 21-17)	Indonesia (INA); L 0-2 (15-21, 13-21)	2nd place, silver medalist(s)
Imam Kunantoro; Suryo Nugroho	Double SL 3, 4/ SU 5	South Korea (KOR); W 2-0 (21-5, 21-5)	Singapore (SIN); W 2-0 (21-14, 21-17)			Bye	India (IND); L 0-2 (17-21, 13-21)	Did not advance	3rd place, bronze medalist(s)

Women

Athlete	Event	Preliminary Round				Quarterfinals	Semifinals	Final	
Athlete	Event	Opposition Score	Opposition Score	Opposition Score	Opposition Score	Opposition Score	Opposition Score	Opposition Score	Rank
(2/2) Khalimatus Sadiyah	Single SL 4/SU 5	Maryam Rahmani (IRI); W 2-1 (21-18, 22-24, 21-11)	Haruka Fujino (JPN); L 0-2 (17-21, 13-21)	(2) Sudsaifon Yodpa (THA); L 0-2 (17-21, 20-22)		did not advance			
(4) Larti	Single SL 4/SU 5	Cheng Hefang (CHN); L 0-2 (13-21, 8-21)	Anita Gurung (NEP); W 2-0 (21-0, 21-0)	Leani Ratri Oktila (INA); L 0-2 (4-21, 5-21)		did not advance			
(1/2) Leani Ratri Oktila	Single SL 4/SU 5	Anita Gurung (NEP); W 2-0 (21-0, 21-0)	Cheng Hefang (CHN); L 1-2 (23-21, 15-21, 13-21)	Larti (INA); W 2-0 (21-4, 21-5)		Haruka Fujino (JPN); W 2-0 (21-12, 21-15)	Sun Shouqun (CHN); L 1-2 (21-15, 9-21, 13-21)	Did not advance	3rd place, bronze medalist(s)
Khalimatus Sadiyah; Leani Ratri Oktila	Double SL 3, 4 / SU 5	Japan (JPN); L 1-2 (21-17, 18-21, 19-21)	Thailand (THA); W 2-0 (21-8, 21-16)	China (CHN); L 0-2 (10-21, 16-21)	Thailand (THA); W 2-0 (21-10, 21-7)				2nd place, silver medalist(s)

Mixed

Athlete	Event	Preliminary Round			Semifinals	Final	
Athlete	Event	Opposition Score	Opposition Score	Opposition Score	Opposition Score	Opposition Score	Rank
Leani Ratri Oktila; Fredy Setiawan	Double SL 3, 4 / SU 5	India (IND); W 2-0 (21-12, 21-10)	Japan (JPN); W 2-0 (21-14, 21-16)	(1) Thailand (THA); W 2-1 (21-13, 18-21, 21-8)	(2) Thailand (THA); W 2-0 (21-13, 21-4)	India (IND); W 2-0 (21-14, 21-15)	1st place, gold medalist(s)
Larti; Dwiyoko	Double SL 3, 4 / SU 5	Japan (JPN); L 0-2 (20-22, 11-21)	(2) Thailand (THA); L 0-2 (14-21, 14-21)	Hong Kong (HKG); W 2-1 (14-21, 21-17, 21-11)	did not advance		

== Powerlifting ==
Men

Athlete	Event	Attempts				Best Lift	Rank
Athlete	Event	1	2	3	4	Best Lift	Rank
Anto Boi	-80 kg	~~190 kg~~	192 kg	~~194 kg~~		192 kg	4
Hero Pariyono	-97 kg	~~190 kg~~	190 kg	~~201 kg~~		190 kg	4

Women

Athlete	Event	Attempts				Best Lift	Rank
Athlete	Event	1	2	3	4	Best Lift	Rank
Ni Nengah Widiasih	-41 kg	93 kg	93 kg	93 kg		93 kg	2nd place, silver medalist(s)
Rani Puji Astuti	-50 kg	75 kg	~~80 kg~~	82 kg		82 kg	3rd place, bronze medalist(s)
Rahayu	-67 kg	90 kg	~~97 kg~~	~~100 kg~~		90 kg	3rd place, bronze medalist(s)
Ni Nengah Widiasih	-79 kg	~~90 kg~~	90 kg	~~100 kg~~		90 kg	3rd place, bronze medalist(s)

== Swimming ==
Men

Athletes	Event	Heat Summary		Final	
Athletes	Event	Result	Rank	Result	Rank
Jendi Pangabean	50 m Freestyle S9	29.63	2 Q	Disqualified	
Jendi Pangabean	100 m Freestyle S9	1:06.15	3 Q	1:05.78	5
Jendi Pangabean	100 m Breaststroke SB8	1:38.70	5	did not advance	
Jendi Pangabean	100 m Backstroke S9	1:09.74	2 Q	1:09.94	4
Tangkilisan Steven Sualang	50 m Freestyle S10	29.00	3 Q	29.19	8
Tangkilisan Steven Sualang	400 m Freestyle S10			5:16.43	5
Tangkilisan Steven Sualang	100 m Backstroke S10	1:11.65	1 Q	1:09.94	2nd place, silver medalist(s)
Menaser Meriba Numberi	50 m Freestyle S12	30.06	8	29.73	6
Menaser Meriba Numberi	100 m Backstroke S12	1:24.70	4 Q	1:26.54	8
Menaser Meriba Numberi	100 m Breaststroke SB12			1:25.46	5
Marinus Melianus Yowei	50 m Freestyle S13	27.30	2 Q	27.66	2nd place, silver medalist(s)
Marinus Melianus Yowei	100 m Freestyle S13	1:02.32	1 Q	1:01.99	2nd place, silver medalist(s)
Marinus Melianus Yowei	100 m Breaststroke SB13	1:20.30	2 Q	1:17.43	1st place, gold medalist(s)
Mulyana	100 m Breaststroke SB4	Disqualified			
Mulyana	50 m Backstroke S4	50.63	1 Q	47.31	2nd place, silver medalist(s)
Mulyana	50 m Freestyle S4	39.66	1 Q	38.99	1st place, gold medalist(s)
Mulyana	100 m Freestyle S4	1:35.39	3 Q	1:31.15	4
Mulyana	50 m Butterfly S4			39.44 WR	1st place, gold medalist(s)
Guntur	100 m Butterfly S8			1:18.39	4
Guntur	100 m Breaststroke SB8	1:26.53	2 Q	1:24.75	5
Guntur	100 m Freestyle S8	32.42	5	did not advance	
Agus Ngaimin	50 m Freestyle S6	35.11	3 Q	34.65	4
Agus Ngaimin	100 m Freestyle S6	1:41.82	6	did not advance	
Agus Ngaimin	100 m Backstroke S6	1:32.12	2 Q	1:26.51	3rd place, bronze medalist(s)
Jumri	50 m Freestyle SB9	Disqualified			
Indonesian Team	4 × 100 m Relay Freestyle 34P			4:39.11	4

Women

Athletes	Event	Heat Summary		Final	
Athletes	Event	Result	Rank	Result	Rank
Sapia Rumbaru	50 m Freestyle S10			34.13	4
Sapia Rumbaru	100 m Freestyle S10			1:19.06	5
Sapia Rumbaru	400 m Freestyle S10	6:09.15	4 Q	6:12.88	8

== Table tennis ==
Men

Athlete	Event	Preliminary Round			Round of 16	Quarterfinals	Semifinals	Final	
Athlete	Event	Opposition Score	Opposition Score	Opposition Score	Opposition Score	Opposition Score	Opposition Score	Opposition Score	Rank
Adyos Astan	Single TT4	Liu Ming-Tang (TPE); W 3-2	Kim Young-Gun (KOR); L 0-3	Muntadher Farooq Ali Al-Sarraji (IRQ); L 1-3		did not advance			
Agus Sutanto	Single TT5	Jedsada Yodyangdaeng (THA); W 3-0	Chao Iong Fok (MAC); W 3-0	Kim Kyung-young (KOR); W 3-1		Wira Chiaochan (THA); W 3-0	Cheng Ming-Chih (TPE); W 3-0	Kim Ki-young (KOR); W 3-0	1st place, gold medalist(s)
Tatok Hardiyanto	Single TT5	Toshihiko Oka (JPN); L 2-3	Asadullo Zikrikhudoev (TJK); W 3-0	Cheng Ming-Chih (TPE); L 0-3		did not advance			
Ajang Abidin	Single TT7	Susumu Miyawaki (JPN); W 3-1	Mohd Nazizul Hamzah (MAS); W 3-1	Liao Keli (CHN); L 0-3		Kim Young-sung (KOR); W 3-2	Yan Shuo (CHN); L 0-3	Did not advance	3rd place, bronze medalist(s)
Abdul Malik Abdullah	Single TT8	Zhao Shuai (CHN); L 0-3	Lam Ka Wai (HKG); W 3-0			Ye Chaoqun (CHN); L 0-3	did not advance		
Leonardo Aritonang	Single TT8	Athula Jayasinghage Don (SRI); W 3-0	Sun Churen (CHN); L 0-3	Pham van Hoang (VIE); L 1-3		did not advance			
Akbar Komet	Single TT10	Om Rajesh Lotlikar (IND); W 3-0	Lee Yao-Tang (TPE); W 3-0	Dinesh D. Pitiyage Don Silva (SRI); L 0-3	Chee Chaoming (MAS); W 3-0	Lin Chun-Ting (TPE); W 3-0	Dian David Mickael Jacobs (INA); L 0-3	Did not advance	3rd place, bronze medalist(s)
Dian David Mickael Jacobs	Single TT10	Batzorig Tungalang (MGL); W 3-0	Bui Quy Thu (VIE); W 3-0		Bye	Choe Chang-Ho (KOR); W 3-0	Akbar Komet (INA); W 3-0	Dinesh D. Pitiyage Don Silva (SRI); W 3-1	1st place, gold medalist(s)
Agus Sutanto; Tatok Hardiyanto	Team TT5	South Korea (KOR); L 2-3	Thailand (THA); W 3-0			Chinese Taipei (TPE); L 0-3	did not advance		
Abdul Malik Abdullah; Leonardo Aritonang	Team TT8	India (IND); W 3-0	China (CHN); L 0-3	Thailand (THA); L 2-3		did not advance			
Akbar Komet; Dian David Mickael Jacobs	Team TT9-10	North Korea (PRK); W 3-0	Hong Kong (HKG); W 3-0			Philippines (PHI); W 3-0	Chinese Taipei (TPE); W 3-0	China (CHN); L 0-3	2nd place, silver medalist(s)

Women

Athlete	Event	Preliminary Round			Quarterfinals	Semifinals	Final	
Athlete	Event	Opposition Score	Opposition Score	Opposition Score	Opposition Score	Opposition Score	Opposition Score	Rank
Osrita Muslim	Single TT3	Asayut Dararat (THA); L 0-3	Maryam Alizadehmehdimahaleh (IRI); L 0-3	Lee Mi-Gyu (KOR); L 0-3	did not advance			
Tarsilem	Single TT4	Wijitra Jaion (THA); L 2-3	Song Kumjong (PRK); W 3-0	Fatmeh Mahd Suliman Al-azzam (JOR); L 0-3	did not advance			
Hana Resti	Single TT9-10	Xiong Guiyan (CHN); L 0-3	Heera Niraula (NEP); W 3-0	Nguyen Thi Hoa Phuong (VIE); W 3-0	Lei Lina (CHN); L 0-3	did not advance		
Sella Dwi Radayana	Single TT9-10	Eldana Baduova (KAZ); W 3-0	Jung Jin-Mi (KOR); W 3-0	Elisa Maria de Costa (TLS); W 3-0	Viet Thi Kim van (VIE); W 3-1	Lei Lina (CHN); L 0-3	Did not advance	3rd place, bronze medalist(s)
Osrita Muslim; Tarsilem	Team TT4-5	South Korea (KOR); L 0-3	Thailand (THA); L 1-3	Jordan (JOR); L 0-3	did not advance			
Hana Resti; Sella Dwi Radayana	Team TT9-10	Thailand (THA); L 1-3	China (CHN); L 0-3		did not advance			

== Ten-pin bowling ==
Athlete	Event	Score	Rank
Jaya Kusuma	Men's Single (TPB 9/10 + TPB 9/10)	920	21
Tetuko Seto	Men's Single (TPB 9/10 + TPB 9/10)	981	16
Jaya Kusuma; Tetuko Seto	Mixed Double (TPB 9/10 + TPB 9/10)	2063	5

== Wheelchair tennis ==
Men

Athlete	Event	Round of 32	Round of 16	Quarterfinals	Semifinals	Final	
Athlete	Event	Opposition Score	Opposition Score	Opposition Score	Opposition Score	Opposition Score	Rank
Agus Fitriadi	Singles	Mohammadreza Yaghoubi (IRI); L 0-2 (1-6, 4-6)	N/A		Singles Consolation Match; Hossein Mamipour (IRI); L 0-2 (0-6, 1-6)	Did not advance	
Agus Sugiharto	Singles	Naseer Mahdi Salih Al Majmaie (IRQ); L 0-2 (2-6, 4-6)	N/A	Singles Consolation Match; Hussein Hamid Hel (IRQ); L 0-2 (1-6, 2-6)	did not advance		
Erwin Subrata	Quad Singles		Teh Soon Seng (MAS); W 2-0 (6-2, 6-2)	(2) Shota Kawano (JPN); L 0-2 (1-6, 1-6)	did not advance		
Mariyanta	Quad Singles		Nattaporn Taosrisakul (THA); W 2-0 (6-1, 6-2)	Kim Kyu-seung (KOR) L 0-2 (2-6, 4-6)	did not advance		
Agus Fitriadi; Agus Sugiharto	Doubles		Thailand (THA); W 2-0 (6-1, 6-0)	Japan (JPN); L 0-2 (0-6, 0-6)	did not advance		
Erwin Subrata; Mariyanta	Quad Doubles			Malaysia (MAS); L 1-2 (6-1, 3-6, 3-6)	did not advance		
