= Athletics at the 2014 Asian Para Games =

Athletics at the 2014 Asian Para Games was held at the Incheon Asiad Main Stadium in Incheon, South Korea in October 2014.

== Participitating nations ==
Below is a list of all the participating NPCs:

- Afghanistan (3)
- Bahrain (9)
- Brunei (7)
- Cambodia (3)
- China (50)
- Hong Kong (12)
- India (39)
- Indonesia (14)
- Iran (59)
- Iraq (11)
- Japan (40)
- Jordan (5)
- Kazakhstan (16)
- Kyrgyzstan (3)
- South Korea (21)
- Kuwait (13)
- Laos (3)
- Macau (6)
- Malaysia (22)
- Mongolia (8)
- Myanmar (4)
- Nepal (3)
- Oman (9)
- Pakistan (6)
- Palestine (1)
- North Korea (1)
- Philippines (12)
- Qatar (7)
- Saudi Arabia (12)
- Singapore (2)
- Sri Lanka (22)
- Syria (2)
- Chinese Taipei (7)
- Tajikistan (1)
- Thailand (45)
- Timor-Leste (2)
- United Arab Emirates (26)
- Uzbekistan (12)
- Vietnam (14)

== Medalists ==
=== Men ===
Event	Gold	Silver	Bronze
100 m T11	Yang Chuan-hui; Chinese Taipei	Kitsana Jorchuy; Thailand	Abdul Halim Dalimunte; Indonesia
100 m T13	Jiang Bingbing; China	Guo Jin; China	Songwut Lamsan; Thailand
100 m T34	Mohamed Hammadi; Kuwait	Ahmad Almutairi; Kuwait	Mohammed Al-Kubaisi; Qatar
100 m T36	Mohammad Azlan Mat Lazin; Malaysia	Mohamad Ridzuan Mohamad Puzi; Malaysia	Jeon Eun-bae; South Korea
100 m T42	Atsushi Yamamoto; Japan	Anil Prasanna Jayalath Yodha Pedige; Sri Lanka	Upul Indika Chuladas Abarana Gedara; Sri Lanka
100 m T52	Peth Rungsri; Thailand	Hirokazu Ueyonabaru; Japan	Pichaya Kurattanasiri; Thailand
100 m T53	Li Huzhao; China	Jung Dong-ho; South Korea	Yoo Byung-hoon; South Korea
100 m T54	Saichon Konjen; Thailand	Yoshifumi Nagao; Japan	Ekkachai Janthon; Thailand
200 m T12	Sun Qichao; China	Seyedhabib Hosseiniliravi; Iran	Watcharin Chujan; Thailand
200 m T35/37/38	Abbas Al-Darraji; Iraq	Amir Firdauss Jamaluddin; Malaysia	Chae Chang-wook; South Korea
200 m T36	Mohammad Azlan Mat Lazin; Malaysia	Mohamad Ridzuan Mohamad Puzi; Malaysia	Mohd Raduan Emeari; Malaysia
200 m T47	Wang Hao; China	Sandeep Singh Maan; India	Tomoki Tagawa; Japan
400 m T37	Shang Guangxu; China	Sakphet Saewang; Thailand	Ali Jabbar Rsaitmawi; Iraq
400 m T38	Abbas Al-Darraji; Iraq	Krishna Kumar Hari Das; Malaysia	Surasak Damchoom; Thailand
400 m T52	Pichaya Kurattanasiri; Thailand	Hirokazu Ueyonabaru; Japan	Peth Rungsri; Thailand
400 m T54	Liu Yang; China	Liu Chengming; China	Saichon Konjen; Thailand
800 m T13	Fakhriddin Khamraev; Uzbekistan	Singh Ramkiaran; India	Damir Pashaev; Uzbekistan
1500 m T11	Shinya Wada; Japan	Hamid Eslami; Iran	Ankur Dhama; India
1500 m T20	Peyman Nasiri Bazanjani; Iran	Yusuke Yamanouchi; Japan	Kuniaki Ishii; Japan
1500 m T46	Marufjon Murodulloev; Uzbekistan	Amin Abdolpour; Iran	Hussein Al-Shibil; Iraq
5000 m T11	Shinya Wada; Japan	Hamid Eslami; Iran	Ankur Dhama; India
5000 m T12	Tadashi Horikoshi; Japan	Ali Elahi; Iran	Yutaka Kumagai; Japan
5000 m T54	Rawat Tana; Thailand	Prawat Wahoram; Thailand	Masayuki Higuchi; Japan
High jump T42/44/47	Sharad Kumar; India	Angcan Chanaboon; Thailand	Girisha Hosanagara; India
Long jump T11/12	Chen Mingyu; China	Mohamad Saifuddin Ishak; Malaysia	Yang Chuan-hui; Chinese Taipei
Long jump T20	Abdul Latif Romly; Malaysia	Mohd Fazli Fauzil; Malaysia	Asaad Ahmad Sharaheli; Saudi Arabia
Long jump T36/37/38	Mohamad Ridzuan Mohamad Puzi; Malaysia	Shang Guangxu; China	Ali Olfatlavi; Iran
Long jump T42/44	Atsushi Yamamoto; Japan	Anil Prasanna Jayalath Yodha Pedige; Sri Lanka	Don Pituwala Kankanange; Sri Lanka
Long jump T47	Liu Fuliang; China	Farukh Mirzakulov; Uzbekistan	Setiyo Budihartanto; Indonesia
Discus throw F11	Phichai Boonsri; Thailand	Arian Lotfi; Iran	Bae Yu-dong; South Korea
Discus throw F32/33	Hani Alnakhli; Saudi Arabia	Ahmed Alhosani; United Arab Emirates	Younes Seifipour; Iran
Discus throw F34	Wang Yanzhang; China	Jalal Khakzadiyeh; Iran	Siamak Saleh Farajzadeh; Iran
Discus throw F37	Khusniddin Norbekov; Uzbekistan	Xia Dong; China	Mohsen Majidijamalabadi; Iran
Discus throw F41	Sadegh Beit Sayah; Iran	Wildan Nukhailawi; Iraq	Kovan Abdulraheem; Iraq
Discus throw F46	Hou Zhanbiao; China	Guo Chunliang; China	Nam Ki-won; South Korea
Discus throw F51/52/53	Alireza Mokhtari; Iran	Amit Kumar; India	Adnan Kumer; Iraq
Shot put F11/12	Mavlonbek Haydarov; Uzbekistan	Masoud Heidari; Iran	Phichai Boonsri; Thailand
Shot put F20	Muhammad Ziyad Zolkefli; Malaysia	Hassan Dehghani; Iran	No bronze medalist
Shot put F32	Younes Seifipour; Iran	Mohammad Nassar; Kuwait	No bronze medalist
Shot put F33	Hani Alnakhli; Saudi Arabia	Abdulaziz Alshkeili; United Arab Emirates	Hassan Malaleih; United Arab Emirates
Shot put F35/36	Danial Souraniyancheshmeh; Iran	Jabbar Al-Azzawi; Iraq	Murtadha Albayati; Iraq
Shot put F37	Xia Dong; China	Khusniddin Norbekov; Uzbekistan	Ahmed Meshaima; Bahrain
Shot put F41	Wildan Nukhailawi; Iraq	Sadegh Beit Sayah; Iran	Kovan Abdulraheem; Iraq
Shot put F53/54	Alireza Mokhtari; Iran	Abdolreza Jokar; Iran	Adnan Kumer; Iraq
Shot put F57	Mohamad Mohamad; Syria	Javid Ehsani; Iran	Amer Abdelaziz; Jordan
Javelin throw F12/13	Seyed Hosseini; Iran	Sajad Nikparast; Iran	Zhu Pengkai; China
Javelin throw F33/34	Wang Yanzhang; China	Mohsen Kaedi; Iran	Abdulrahman Abdulrahman; Qatar
Javelin throw F42/44	Fu Yanlong; China	Narender; India	Ali Omidi; Iran
Javelin throw F46	Guo Chunliang; China	Devendra; India	Abdolrasoul Mirshekari; Iran
Javelin throw F55/56	Mohammad Alvanpour; Iran	Nguyen Be Hau; Vietnam	Shari Haji Juma'at; Brunei
Club throw F31/32/51	Amit Kumar; India	Radhi Alharthi; Saudi Arabia	Mohammad Nassar; Kuwait

=== Women ===
Event	Gold	Silver	Bronze
100 m T11	Liu Cuiqing; China	Chen Yan; China	Kewalin Wannaruemon; Thailand
100 m T13	Zhu Lin; China	Tomomi Sato; Japan	No bronze medalist
100 m T35/37/38	Chen Junfei; China	Li Yingli; China	Cao Yuanhang; China
100 m T36	Jeon Min-jae; South Korea	Yuki Kato; Japan	Wong Sze Yan; Hong Kong
100 m T44/47	Wang Yanping; China	Pagjiraporn Gagun; Thailand	Saki Takakuwa; Japan
200 m T11	Liu Cuiqing; China	Chen Yan; China	Kewalin Wannaruemon; Thailand
200 m T35/38	Chen Junfei; China	Li Yingli; China	Liu Ping; China
200 m T36	Jeon Min-jae; South Korea	Yuki Kato; Japan	Yam Kwok Fan; Hong Kong
200 m T47	Wang Yanping; China	Pagjiraporn Gagun; Thailand	Ama Lallwala Palliya Gurunnanselage; Sri Lanka
200 m T53	Huang Lisha; China	Kazumi Nakayama; Japan	Pranaya Sekratok; Thailand
200 m T54	Dong Hongjiao; China	Jin Yawei; China	Chen Yu-lien; Chinese Taipei
400 m T20	Siti Nooriasah Mohamad Ariffin; Malaysia	Mai Iwakiri; Japan	Sayaka Makita; Japan
400m T37/38/47	Chen Junfei; China	Pagjiraporn Gagun; Thailand	Li Yingli; China
400 m T53	Zhou Hongzhuan; China	Kazumi Nakayama; Japan	Pranaya Sekratok; Thailand
400 m T54	Liu Wenjun; China	Jin Yawei; China	Tpat Chatyotsakorn; Thailand
800 m T53	Zhou Hongzhuan; China	Huang Lisha; China	Kazumi Nakayama; Japan
800 m T54	Liu Wenjun; China	Jin Yawei; China	Tpat Chatyotsakorn; Thailand
1500 m T20	Makiko Toyoshima; Japan	Misaki Ari; Japan	Sayaka Makita; Japan
1500 m T54	Zhou Hongzhuan; China	Liu Wenjun; China	Huang Lisha; China
Long jump F20	Siti Noor Radiah Ismail; Malaysia	Siti Nooriasah Mohamad Ariffin; Malaysia	Mirai Kurauchi; Japan
Discus throw F11/12	Zhang Liangmin; China	Hajar Taktaz; Iran	Hemala Devi Eni Kutty; Malaysia
Discus throw F33/34	Sara Masoud; Qatar	Aishah Alkhaaldi; United Arab Emirates	Thuraya Alzaabi; United Arab Emirates
Discus throw F36/37/38	Mi Na; China	Jia Qianqian; China	Umi Syuhadah Idris; Malaysia
Discus throw F41/46	Yukiko Kato; Japan	Patcharee Wisetsee; Thailand	Maryam Almatrooshi; United Arab Emirates
Discus throw F52/53/54	Yang Liwan; China	Marites Burce; Philippines	Fatema Nedham; Bahrain
Discus throw F55/56	Dong Feixia; China	Hashemiyeh Motaghian; Iran	Karamjyoti; India
Discus throw F57	Liu Ming; China	Azam Khodayari; Iran	Fatemeh Montazeri; Iran
Shot put F11/12	Zhang Liangmin; China	Hajar Taktaz; Iran	Hemala Devi Eni Kutty; Malaysia
Shot put F32/33	Sara Masoud; Qatar	Saja Alazemi; Kuwait	Aishah Alkhaaldi; United Arab Emirates
Shot put F34	Zou Lijuan; China	Faezeh Kermani; Iran	Maryam Soltani; Iran
Shot put F44	Yao Juan; China	Yang Yue; China	Doriah Poulus; Malaysia
Shot put F57	Mahnaz Amini; Iran	Fatemeh Montazeri; Iran	Tsogtgerel Gendendarjaa; Mongolia
Javelin throw F33/34	Zou Lijuan; China	Aishah Alkhaaldi; United Arab Emirates	Faezeh Kermani; Iran
Javelin throw F37/38	Jia Qianqian; China	Mi Na; China	Nguyen Thi Mai; Vietnam
Javelin throw F46	Surang Khamsuk; Thailand	Maryam Almatrooshi; United Arab Emirates	No bronze medalist
Javelin throw F53/54	Yang Liwan; China	Deepa Malik; India	Marziyeh Sedghi; Iran
Javelin throw F55/56	Dong Feixia; China	Hashemiyeh Motaghian; Iran	Leila Malaki; Iran
Javelin throw F57	Mahnaz Amini; Iran	Liu Ming; China	Siham Al-Rasheedy; United Arab Emirates
Club throw F31/32/51	Kim Sun-jeong; South Korea	Noura Alktebi; United Arab Emirates	No bronze medalist
