= Cycling at the 2014 Asian Para Games =

Athletic competition

Paralympic Cycling at the 2014 Asian Para Games

Cycling at the 2014 Asian Para Games were held in Korea

== Medals ==
Rank	Nation	Gold	Silver	Bronze	Total
1	China (CHN)	8	6	5	19
2	South Korea (KOR)	6	4	5	15
3	Japan (JPN)	3	4	0	7
4	Lebanon (LBN)	0	2	0	2
5	Malaysia (MAS)	0	1	3	4
6	Philippines (PHI)	0	0	1	1
Totals (6 entries)		17	17	14	48

== Medalists ==
=== Road cycling ===
Event	Gold	Silver	Bronze
Mixed Road Race B	Chun Dae-hong; Kim Jong-Giu; South Korea	Tatsuyuki Oshiro; Koji Miyakoshi; Japan	Razif Salleh; Mohd Khairul Hazwan Wahab; Malaysia
Mixed Road Race C1-3	Xie Hao; China	Li Zhangyu; China	Jin Yong-sik; South Korea
Mixed Road Race C4-5	Wei Guoping; China	Liu Xinyang; China	Arthus Bucay; Philippines
Mixed Road Race H3	Kim Yong-ki; South Korea	Edward Maalouf; Lebanon	Jung Suh-wan; South Korea
Mixed Road Race H4	Lee In-jea; South Korea	Naohiko Okumura; Japan	No bronze medalist
Mixed Time Trial B	Yurie Kanuma; Koji Miyakoshi; Japan	Chun Dae-hong; Kim Jong-giu; South Korea	No bronze medalist
Mixed Time Trial C1-5	Li Zhangyu; China	Liu Xinyang; China	Li Jieli; China
Mixed Time Trial H1-3	Kim Yong-ki; South Korea	Edward Maalouf; Lebanon	Jung Suh-wan; South Korea
Mixed Time Trial H4-5	Naohiko Okumura; Japan	Lee In-jea; South Korea	No bronze medalist
Women's Road Race C1-5	Guo Qing; China	Dong Jingping; China	Song Zhenling; China
Women's Road Race H3-4	Lee Do-yeon; South Korea	Lee Seung-mi; South Korea	Kim Jung-im; South Korea

=== Track cycling ===
Event	Gold	Silver	Bronze
Mixed 4 km Pursuit B	Chun Dae-hong; Kim Jong-giu; South Korea	Tatsuyuki Oshiro; Koji Miyakoshi; Japan	Hafiz Sufian; Aiman Asyraff; Malaysia
Mixed 4 km Pursuit C4-5	Liu Xinyang; China	Masashi Ishii; Japan	Najib Turano; Malaysia
Mixed 1000m Time Trial B	Yukie Kanuma; Sakiko Numabe; Japan	Hafiz Sufian; Aiman Asyraff; Malaysia	Chun Dae-hong; Kim Jong-giu; South Korea
Mixed 4 km Pursuit MC1-3/WC4-5	Li Zhangyu; China	Jin Yong-sik; South Korea	Xie Hao; China
Mixed 1000m Time Trial C1-5	Li Zhangyu; China	Liu Xinyang; China	Xie Hao; China
Women's 500m Time Trial C1-5	Song Zhenling; China	Guo Qing; China	Dong Jingping; China
