= Wheelchair dance sport at the 2014 Asian Para Games =

Wheelchair dance sport at the 2014 Asian Para Games was held in South Korea.

== Medals ==
Rank	Nation	Gold	Silver	Bronze	Total
1	South Korea (KOR)	5	0	1	6
2	Hong Kong (HKG)	1	1	1	3
3	Chinese Taipei (TPE)	0	2	2	4
4	Kazakhstan (KAZ)	0	2	1	3
5	Philippines (PHI)	0	1	0	1
6	Japan (JPN)	0	0	1	1
Totals (6 entries)		6	6	6	18
