= Table tennis at the 2014 Asian Para Games =

Para table tennis at the 2014 Asian Para Games
- Venue: Songdo Global University Gymnasium
- Location: Incheon, South Korea
- Dates: 19–24 October
- Competitors: 211 from 26 nations

Table tennis at the 2014 Asian Para Games was held at the Songdo Global University Gymnasium in Incheon, South Korea from 19 to 24 October 2014.

== Participitating Nations ==
Below is a list of all the participating NPCs

- Afghanistan (2)
- China (8)
- Hong Kong (3)
- India (2)
- Iran (8)
- Iraq (2)
- Japan (2)
- Kazakhstan (3)
- Kyrgyzstan (3)
- South Korea (15)
- Kuwait (1)
- Mongolia (5)
- Singapore (2)
- Sri Lanka (3)
- Chinese Taipei (4)
- Thailand (14)
- United Arab Emirates (4)
- Uzbekistan (1)

== Medal summary ==
* Host nation (South Korea)

Rank	Nation	Gold	Silver	Bronze	Total
1	China (CHN)	19	7	6	32
2	South Korea (KOR)*	5	12	10	27
3	Indonesia (INA)	2	1	3	6
4	Hong Kong (HKG)	1	1	4	6
5	Japan (JPN)	1	0	5	6
6	Thailand (THA)	0	3	6	9
7	Chinese Taipei (TPE)	0	1	7	8
8	Jordan (JOR)	0	1	2	3
9	Iran (IRI)	0	1	1	2
10	Sri Lanka (SRI)	0	1	0	1
11	Macau (MAC)	0	0	1	1
11	Malaysia (MAS)	0	0	1	1
11	North Korea (PRK)	0	0	1	1
11	Philippines (PHI)	0	0	1	1
11	Vietnam (VIE)	0	0	1	1
Totals (15 entries)		28	28	49	105

== Results ==
=== Men ===
Event	Class	Gold	Silver	Bronze
Singles	TT 2	Kim Min-gyu; South Korea	Hassan Janfeshan; Iran	Cha Soo Yong; South Korea
Singles	TT 2	Kim Min-gyu; South Korea	Hassan Janfeshan; Iran	Ali Ranjbar; Iran
Singles	TT 3	Feng Panfeng; China	Osama Abu Jame; Jordan	Kim Jin-sung; South Korea
Singles	TT 3	Feng Panfeng; China	Osama Abu Jame; Jordan	Zhai Xiang; China
Singles	TT 4	Kim Young-gun; South Korea	Choi Il-Sang; South Korea	Zhang Yan; China
Singles	TT 4	Kim Young-gun; South Korea	Choi Il-Sang; South Korea	Kim Jung-gil; South Korea
Singles	TT 5	Agus Sutanto; Indonesia	Kim Ki-young; South Korea	Cheng Minh Chih; Chinese Taipei
Singles	TT 5	Agus Sutanto; Indonesia	Kim Ki-young; South Korea	Lin Yen-hung; Chinese Taipei
Singles	TT 6	Park Hong Kyu; South Korea	Rungroj Thainiyom; Thailand	Jon Ju Hyon; North Korea
Singles	TT 6	Park Hong Kyu; South Korea	Rungroj Thainiyom; Thailand	Choy Hing Lam; Hong Kong
Singles	TT 7	Liao Keli; China	Yan Shuo; China	Masachika Inoue; Japan
Singles	TT 7	Liao Keli; China	Yan Shuo; China	Ajang Abidin; Indonesia
Singles	TT 8	Zhao Shuai; China	Ye Chao Qun; China	Kim Kwang-jin; South Korea
Singles	TT 8	Zhao Shuai; China	Ye Chao Qun; China	Sun Churen; China
Singles	TT 9	Ma Lin; China	Zhao Yi Qing; China	Wong Chi Yin; Hong Kong
Singles	TT 9	Ma Lin; China	Zhao Yi Qing; China	Koyo Iwabuchi; Japan
Singles	TT 10	David Jacobs; Indonesia	Dinesh Deshappriya Pitiyage Don Silva; Sri Lanka	Komet Akbar; Indonesia
Singles	TT 10	David Jacobs; Indonesia	Dinesh Deshappriya Pitiyage Don Silva; Sri Lanka	Ge Yang; China
Singles	TT 11	Takeshi Takemori; Japan	Kim Gi Tae; South Korea	Kim Byoung-ha; South Korea
Singles	TT 11	Takeshi Takemori; Japan	Kim Gi Tae; South Korea	Takashi Takeda; Japan
Team	TT 1–3	China; Feng Panfeng; Zhai Xiang	Thailand; Anurak Laowong; Wittaya Wichaiwattana	South Korea; Young Ill-Jeyoung; Kim Jin-sung; Kim Min-gyu
Team	TT 1–3	China; Feng Panfeng; Zhai Xiang	Thailand; Anurak Laowong; Wittaya Wichaiwattana	Hong Kong; Ko Hang Yee; Choi Siu Hung; Lau Wing Cheong
Team	TT 4	South Korea; Kim Young-gun; Choi Il-Sang; Kim Jung-gil	Chinese Taipei; Lin Wen-hsin; Liu Ming Tang	Thailand; Wanchai Chaiwut; Niyom Nachai
Team	TT 5	China; Cao Ningning; Zhang Yan; Guo Xingyuan	South Korea; Kim Ki-young; Kim Kyung Young	Chinese Taipei; Cheng Minh Chih; Lin Yen-hung
Team	TT 5	China; Cao Ningning; Zhang Yan; Guo Xingyuan	South Korea; Kim Ki-young; Kim Kyung Young	Japan; Toshihiko Oka; Shinichi Yoshida; Kotaro Doi
Team	TT 6–7	China; Liao Keli; Yan Shuo; Chen Chao	South Korea; Park Hong Kyu; Kim Young-sung	Thailand; Rungroj Thainiyom; Yuttana Namsaga; Chalermpong Punpoo
Team	TT 8	China; Ye Chao Qun; Zhao Shuai; Sun Churen	South Korea; Kim Kwang-jin; Yang Gui Nam	Chinese Taipei; Hou Ting-sung; Hu Ming-fu
Team	TT 8	China; Ye Chao Qun; Zhao Shuai; Sun Churen	South Korea; Kim Kwang-jin; Yang Gui Nam	Thailand; Parinya Chuaigate Keereerut; Komkrit Charitsat
Team	TT 9–10	China; Ge Yang; Ma Lin; Lian Hao; Zhao Yi Qing	Indonesia; David Jacobs; Komet Akbar	Malaysia; Chee Chaoming; Ting Ing Hock; Mohamad Azwar Bakar
Team	TT 9–10	China; Ge Yang; Ma Lin; Lian Hao; Zhao Yi Qing	Indonesia; David Jacobs; Komet Akbar	Chinese Taipei; Ju Ren-Der; Lin Chun Ting; Lee Yao-tang

=== Women ===
Event	Class	Gold	Silver	Bronze
Singles	TT 1–2	Liu Jing; China	Seo Su Yeon; South Korea	
Singles	TT 3	Lee Mi Gyu; South Korea	Xue Juan; China	Li Qian; China
Singles	TT 3	Lee Mi Gyu; South Korea	Xue Juan; China	Dararat Asayut; Thailand
Singles	TT 4	Zhou Ying; China	Zhang Miao; China	Lu Pi-chun; Chinese Taipei
Singles	TT 4	Zhou Ying; China	Zhang Miao; China	Wijittra Jaion; Thailand
Singles	TT 5	Zhang Bian; China	Jung Young A South Korea	Khetam Abuawad; Jordan
Singles	TT 5	Zhang Bian; China	Jung Young A South Korea	Kimie Bessho; Japan
Singles	TT 6–7	Wang Rui; China	Kim Seong Ok; South Korea	Lam Oi Man; Macau
Singles	TT 6–7	Wang Rui; China	Kim Seong Ok; South Korea	Lee Kun Woo; South Korea
Singles	TT 8	Mao Jingdian; China	Pan Mengyi; China	Koh Duk Ja; South Korea
Singles	TT 8	Mao Jingdian; China	Pan Mengyi; China	Josephine Medina; Philippines
Singles	TT 9–10	Yang Qian; China	Lei Li Na; China	Xiong Guiyan; China
Singles	TT 9–10	Yang Qian; China	Lei Li Na; China	Shella Dwi Radayana; Indonesia
Singles	TT 11	Wong Ka Man; Hong Kong	Ng Mui Wui; Hong Kong	Wong Pui Kei; Hong Kong
Singles	TT 11	Wong Ka Man; Hong Kong	Ng Mui Wui; Hong Kong	Seo Yang Hee; South Korea
Team	TT 1–3	China; Li Qian; Xue Juan; Liu Jing	South Korea; Lee Mi Gyu; Seo Su Yeon; Kim Sun-ja	Thailand; Chilchitraryak Bootwansirina; Dararat Asayut
Team	TT 4–5	China; Zhang Bian; Zhou Ying; Zhang Miao	South Korea; Jung Young A Jung Ji-nam; Kang Oejeong	Jordan; Faten Elelimat; Fatmeh Al Azzam; Khetam Abuawad
Team	TT 4–5	China; Zhang Bian; Zhou Ying; Zhang Miao	South Korea; Jung Young A Jung Ji-nam; Kang Oejeong	Chinese Taipei; Wei Mei Hui; Lu Pi-chun
Team	TT 6–8	China; Mao Jingdian; Pan Mengyi; Wang Rui	South Korea; Kim Seong Ok; Lee Kun Woo	
Team	TT 9–10	China; Yang Qian; Lei Li Na; Xiong Guiyan; Liu Meng	Thailand; Wachiraporn Thepmoya; Chayanan Settisrikoedkun	Vietnam; Nguyen Thi Hoa Phuong; Viet Thi Kim Van
Team	TT 9–10	China; Yang Qian; Lei Li Na; Xiong Guiyan; Liu Meng	Thailand; Wachiraporn Thepmoya; Chayanan Settisrikoedkun	South Korea; Jung Jin Mi; Koh Duk Ja

== See also ==
- Table tennis at the 2014 Asian Games
