= Powerlifting at the 2014 Asian Para Games =

Paralympic Powerlifting at the 2014 Asian Para Games
- Location: Incheon, China
- Dates: 25–29 October

Powerlifting at the 2014 Asian Para Games was held in Incheon, South Korea from October 19 to 23, 2014.

== Medals ==
Rank	Nation	Gold	Silver	Bronze	Total
1	China (CHN)	7	2	0	9
2	Iran (IRI)	4	4	0	8
3	Vietnam (VIE)	2	2	0	4
4	Thailand (THA)	2	1	3	6
5	Jordan (JOR)	1	2	0	3
6	Iraq (IRQ)	1	1	2	4
6	South Korea (KOR)	1	1	2	4
8	United Arab Emirates (UAE)	1	0	2	3
9	Chinese Taipei (TPE)	1	0	1	2
10	Turkmenistan (TKM)	0	2	1	3
11	Philippines (PHI)	0	2	0	2
12	Indonesia (INA)	0	1	3	4
13	Syria (SYR)	0	1	2	3
14	Malaysia (MAS)	0	1	1	2
15	India (IND)	0	0	1	1
15	Japan (JPN)	0	0	1	1
15	Mongolia (MGL)	0	0	1	1
Totals (17 entries)		20	20	20	60

== Medalists ==
=== Men ===
Event	Gold	Silver	Bronze
–49kg	Le Van Cong; Vietnam	Mustafa Radhi; Iraq	Basha Farman; India
–54kg	Nyugen Binh An; Vietnam	Feng Qi; China	Hussein Juboori; Iraq
–59kg	Amir Jafari Arangeh; Iran	Hamzeh Mohammadi; Iran	Narong Kasanun; Thailand
–65kg	Rasool Mohsin; Iraq	Liu Lei; China	Shadi Issa; Syria
–72kg	Abdelkareem Khattab; Jordan	Sergey Meladze; Turkmenistan	Moon Jung-hoon; South Korea
–80kg	Gu Xiaofei; China	Majid Farzin; Iran	Thongsa Marasri; Thailand
–88kg	Hamed Solhipour; Iran	Mutaz Al Juniedi; Jordan	Sodnompiljee Enkhbayar; Mongolia
–97kg	Mohammed Khamis Khalaf; United Arab Emirates	Saman Razi; Iran	Yee Khie Jong; Malaysia
–107kg	Ali Sadeghzadeh; Iran	Mohd Shamil Saad; Malaysia	Prakit Tongsang; Thailand
+107kg	Siamand Rahman; Iran	Mansour Pourmirzaei; Iran	Chun Keun-bae; South Korea

=== Women ===
Event	Gold	Silver	Bronze
–41kg	Cui Zhe; China	Ni Nengah Widiasih; Indonesia	Noura Baddour; Syria
–45kg	Hu Dandan; China	Achelle Guion; Philippines	Hiromi Kobayashi; Japan
–50kg	Wandi Kongmuang; Thailand	Dang Thi Linh Phuong; Vietnam	Rani Puji Astuti; Indonesia
–55kg	Shi Shanshan; China	Chau Hoang Tuyet Loan; Vietnam	Lin Ya-hsuan; Chinese Taipei
–61kg	Yang Yan; China	Valentina Simakova; Turkmenistan	Dhikra Saleem; Iraq
–67kg	Tan Yujiao; China	Somkhoun Anon; Thailand	Rahayu Rahayu; Indonesia
–73kg	Arawan Bootpo; Thailand	Rasha Alshikh; Syria	Mayagozel Ekeyeva; Turkmenistan
–79kg	Lin Tzu-hui; Chinese Taipei	Tharwh Alhajaj; South Korea	Ni Nengah Widiasih; Indonesia
–86kg	Deng Xuemei; China	Lee Young-sun; South Korea	Haifa Naqbi; United Arab Emirates
+86kg	Lee Hyun-jung; South Korea	Adeline Ancheta; Philippines	Ansaf Alnuaimi; United Arab Emirates

== See also ==
- Weightlifting at the 2014 Asian Games
