= Siham Al-Rasheedy =

United Arab Emirati Paralympic athlete

Personal information
- Native name: سهام مسعود الرشيدي
- Born: 1982 (age 43–44) Dubai, United Arab Emirates

Sport
- Country: United Arab Emirates
- Sport: Para-athletics
- Disability: Poliomyelitis
- Disability class: F57/58
- Events: Discus throw Javelin throw shot put
Medal record
Women's para-athletics
Representing United Arab Emirates
Asian Para Games
Silver medal – second place	2010 Guangzhou	Discus throw F57–58
Bronze medal – third place	2014 Incheon	Javelin throw F57
IWAS Games
Gold medal – first place	2017 Vila Real de Santo António	Discus throw F54/55/56/57
West Asian Para Games
Silver medal – second place	2017 Khorfakkan	Shot put F57

Saham Masoud Al-Rasheedy (Arabic: سهام مسعود الرشيدي) (born 1982) is a Paralympic athlete from the United Arab Emirates and a member of the UAE Paralympic Team. She competes in the F57/58 category in discus, javelin, and shot put. Her roles in sports advocacy include membership on both the Dubai Club for People of Determination and the Athletes' Commission of World Athletics (formerly the IAAF).

She has competed in numerous national, continental, and international championships, representing the UAE at two consecutive Summer Paralympic Games; London 2012 and Rio 2016.

== Career ==
Al Rasheedy contracted Poliomyelitis just six months after birth, which resulted in partial paralysis on the left side of her body. Following extensive medical treatment and several surgeries, she regained her ability to walk, though with limited mobility.

Her athletic journey began in 2005 when she joined the Dubai Club for People of Determination. She made a remarkable competitive debut at the 2005 Gulf Championships, hosted by the UAE, where she immediately claimed two gold medals in the javelin throw and shot put, in addition to a silver medal in the discus throw. This early success marked the start of a prolific career that would see her compete in numerous continental and international championships.

Al Rasheedy won the silver medal in the F57–58 discus throw at the 2010 Asian Para Games in Guangzhou, China, and a bronze medal in the F57 javelin throw at the 2014 Asian Para Games, Incheon, South Korea. She finished second to her compatriot Aishah Al Alkaaldi in the F57/58 javelin throw, and finished first in the F54/55/56/57Women's discus throw at the 2017 IWAS World Championship in Vila Real de Santo António, Portugal. She also competed in the 1st West Asia Para Games 2017 in Khorfakkan, UAE, where she won the silver medal in the F56/57 shot put.

== Achievements ==
Year	Competition	Venue	Position	Event	Notes
Representing United Arab Emirates
2010	2010 Asian Para Games	Guangzhou, China	2nd	Discus throw	F57–58
2014	2014 Asian Para Games	Incheon, South Korea	3rd	Javelin throw	F57
2017	2017 World Abilitysport Games	Vila Real de Santo António, Portugal	1st	Discus throw	F54/55/56/57
2017	2017 West Asia Para Games	Khorfakkan, UAE	2nd	Shot put	F57
