= Badminton at the 2014 Asian Para Games =

- Venue: Gyeyang Gymnasium
- Dates: October 19–23, 2014
- Competitors: 109 from 15 nations

Badminton at the 2014 Asian Para Games was held at the Gyeyang Gymnasium in Incheon, South Korea from October 19 to 23, 2014.

== Medal table ==
Rank	Nation	Gold	Silver	Bronze	Total
1	South Korea (KOR)	5	4	4	13
2	Indonesia (INA)	4	3	4	11
3	China (CHN)	2	1	2	5
4	Malaysia (MAS)	2	0	3	5
5	India (IND)	1	4	1	6
6	Thailand (THA)	1	3	5	9
7	Japan (JPN)	0	0	3	3
8	Chinese Taipei (TPE)	0	0	2	2
8	Vietnam (VIE)	0	0	2	2
Totals (9 entries)		15	15	26	56

== Medalists ==
=== Men ===
Event	Class	Gold	Silver	Bronze
Singles	SL3	Ukun Rukaendi; Indonesia	Manoj Sarkar; India	Pramod Bhagat; India
Singles	SL3	Ukun Rukaendi; Indonesia	Manoj Sarkar; India	Pham Duc Trung; Vietnam
Singles	SL4	Fredy Setiawan; Indonesia	Tarun Dhillon; India	Cheng-Che Lin; Chinese Taipei
Singles	SL4	Fredy Setiawan; Indonesia	Tarun Dhillon; India	Bakri Omar; Malaysia
Singles	SU5	Cheah Liek Hou; Malaysia	Oddie Kurnia Dwi; Indonesia	Imam Kunantoro; Indonesia
Singles	SU5	Cheah Liek Hou; Malaysia	Oddie Kurnia Dwi; Indonesia	Suryo Nugroho; Indonesia
Singles	WH1	Choi Jung-man; South Korea	Lee Sam-seop; South Korea	Jakarin Homhaul; Thailand
Singles	WH1	Choi Jung-man; South Korea	Lee Sam-seop; South Korea	Osamu Nagashima; Japan
Singles	WH2	Kim Jung-jun; South Korea	Kim Kyung-hoon; South Korea	Kim Sung-hun; South Korea
Singles	WH2	Kim Jung-jun; South Korea	Kim Kyung-hoon; South Korea	Madzlan Saibon; Malaysia
Doubles	SL3–SL4	Indonesia; Hary Susanto; Ukun Rukaendi	Indonesia; Dwiyoko; Fredy Setiawan	Malaysia; Md Radhi Juhari; Hairul Fozi Saaba
Doubles	SL3–SL4	Indonesia; Hary Susanto; Ukun Rukaendi	Indonesia; Dwiyoko; Fredy Setiawan	Chinese Taipei; Cheng Che-Lin; Hsing Chih Huang
Doubles	SU5	Malaysia; Cheah Liek Hou; Suhaili Laiman	India; Raj Kumar; Rakesh Pandey	Indonesia; Suryo Nugroho; Imam Kunantoro
Doubles	SU5	Malaysia; Cheah Liek Hou; Suhaili Laiman	India; Raj Kumar; Rakesh Pandey	Vietnam; Pham Hong Tuan; Tram Minh Nhuan
Doubles	WH1–WH2	South Korea; Choi Jung-man; Kim Sung-hun	South Korea; Kim Kyung-hoon; Lee Sam-seop	Thailand; Junthong Dumnern; Jakarin Homhual

=== Women ===
Event	Class	Gold	Silver	Bronze
Singles	SL3	Parul Parmar; India	Wandee Kamtam; Thailand	Paramee Panyachaem; Thailand
Singles	SL4–SU5	Sun Shouqun; China	Cheng Hefang; China	Leani Ratri Oktila; Indonesia
Singles	SL4–SU5	Sun Shouqun; China	Cheng Hefang; China	Ma Huihui; China
Singles	WH1–WH2	Lee Sun-ae; South Korea	Amnouy Wetwithan; Thailand	Kim Yeon-sim; South Korea
Singles	WH1–WH2	Lee Sun-ae; South Korea	Amnouy Wetwithan; Thailand	Wang Ping; China
Doubles	SL3–SU5	China; Cheng Hefang; Ma Huihui	Indonesia; Leani Ratri Oktila; Khalimatus Sadiyah	Japan; Noriko Ito; Akiko Sugino
Doubles	WH1–WH2	South Korea; Kim Yeon-sim; Lee Mi-ok	Thailand; Sujirat Pookkham; Amnouy Wetwithan	South Korea; Lee Sun-ae; Son Ok-cha

=== Mixed ===
Event	Class	Gold	Silver	Bronze
Doubles	SL3–SU5	Indonesia; Fredy Setiawan; Leani Ratri Oktila	India; Raj Kumar; Parul Parmar	Thailand; Adisak Saengarayakul; Chanida Srinavakul
Doubles	SL3–SU5	Indonesia; Fredy Setiawan; Leani Ratri Oktila	India; Raj Kumar; Parul Parmar	Japan; Gen Shogaki; Noriko Ito
Doubles	WH1–WH2	Thailand; Jakarin Homhual; Amnouy Wetwithan	South Korea; Lee Sam-seop; Lee Sun Ae	South Korea; Kim Jung-jun; Son Ok Cha
Doubles	WH1–WH2	Thailand; Jakarin Homhual; Amnouy Wetwithan	South Korea; Lee Sam-seop; Lee Sun Ae	Thailand; Dumnern Junthong; Sujirat Pookkham

== See also ==
- Badminton at the 2014 Asian Games
