= Bowling at the 2014 Asian Para Games =

Ten pin bowling at the 2014 Asian Para Games was held in Incheon, South Korea from October 19 to October 21, 2014.

== Medalists ==
Event	Gold	Silver	Bronze
Mixed Single (TPB 1)	Kim Jung-Hoon; South Korea	Nam Sang-Im; South Korea	Tack No-Gyun; South Korea
Mixed Single (TPB 2/3)	Bae Jin-Hyung; South Korea	Lee Jae-Youn; South Korea	Huang Yu-Hsiao; Chinese Taipei
Mixed Single (TPB 8)	Kim Byeong-Su; South Korea	Huang Jen-Jung; Chinese Taipei	Lee Chia-Chieh; Chinese Taipei
Mixed Single (TPB 9/10)	Son Dae-Ho; South Korea	Lee Min-Su; South Korea	Lu Ju-Huang; Chinese Taipei
Mixed Double (TPB 2/3 + TPB 2/3)	Chinese Taipei (TPE); Huang Tzu-Hsuan; Huang Yu-Hsiao	Malaysia (MAS); Ab Hamid Muhamad Suhaili; Ku Harun Ku Izham	South Korea (KOR); Kim Jae-Cheol; Koh Young-Bae
Mixed Double (TPB 1 + TPB 2/3)	South Korea (KOR); Kim Jung-Hoon; Bae Jin-Hyung	Chinese Taipei (TPE); Chiu Pei-Yu; Ke Ming-Shuo	Malaysia (MAS); Amir Hassan Azuan; Siran Zainul Akmal
Mixed Double (TPB 8 + TPB 8)	South Korea (KOR); Kwon Min-Kyu; Park Sang-Soo	Malaysia (MAS); Ishak Mohd Khairul; AMIL HUSIN Ahmad	Singapore (SIN); Tay Leong Hock: Anuar Bin Saaid
Mixed Double (TPB 8 + TPB 9/10)	South Korea (KOR); Kim Byeong-Su; Woo Gyeong-Seon	Chinese Taipei (TPE); Huang Jen-Jung; Lu Tai-An	Chinese Taipei (TPE); Lee Chia-Chieh; Chang Hui-Min
Mixed Double (TPB 9/10 + TPB 9/10)	South Korea (KOR); Son Dae-Ho; Lee Min-Su	Philippines (PHI); Matias Samuel; Chi Kim Ian	Malaysia (MAS); Wong Kee Soon; Nyat Abu Bakar
Mixed Team (TPB 1 + TPB 2/3 + TPB 2/3)	South Korea (KOR); Kim Jung-Hoon; Bae Jin-Hyung; Lee Yun-Kyung	Chinese Taipei (TPE); Chiu Pei-Yu; Ke Ming-Shuo; Huang Yu-Hsiao	Brunei (BRU); Danggat Muhammad Jamary Bin; Haji Abd Ghaffar Kamarul Ariffin B. Haji Awang Damit Saidin Bin
Mixed Team (TPB 8 + TPB 9/10 + TPB 9/10)	South Korea (KOR); Kwon Min-Kyu; Min Jin-Ho; Lee Min-Su	Chinese Taipei (TPE); Lee Chia-Chieh; Yang Meng-Chang; Lai Fou-Hwan	South Korea (KOR); Kim Byeong-Su; Son Dae-Ho; Yoon Hyung-Kook
Mixed Team (TPB 8 + TPB 2/3 + TPB 2/3)	South Korea (KOR); Park Sang-Soo; Koh Young-Bae; Kim Jae-Cheol	Malaysia (MAS); Amil Husin Ahmad; Siran Zainul Akmal; Ab Hamid Muhamad Suhaili	Singapore (SIN); Anuar Bin Saaid; Ong Kim Soea; Hussain Mohamed Ismail

== Medal table ==
* Host nation (South Korea)

Rank	Nation	Gold	Silver	Bronze	Total
1	South Korea (KOR)*	11	3	3	17
2	Chinese Taipei (TPE)	1	5	4	10
3	Malaysia (MAS)	0	3	2	5
4	Philippines (PHI)	0	1	0	1
5	Singapore (SIN)	0	0	2	2
6	Brunei (BRU)	0	0	1	1
Totals (6 entries)		12	12	12	36

== Participating nations ==
A total of 85 athletes from 10 nations competed in Ten-pin Bowling at the 2014 Asian Para Games:

- Brunei (4)
- Hong Kong (10)
- Indonesia (2)
- South Korea (16)
- Malaysia (15)
- Philippines (9)
- Singapore (7)
- Thailand (4)
- Chinese Taipei (14)
- Vietnam (4)
