= Rowing at the 2014 Asian Para Games =

- Venue: Hanam Misari Rowing Center
- Location: Incheon, South Korea
- Dates: 20–21 October
- Competitors: 27 from 4 nations

Rowing at the 2014 Asian Para Games was held at Hanam Misari Rowing Center in Incheon, South Korea, from October 20 to 21, 2014. Two gold medals were awarded.

== Medal summary ==
=== Medal table ===
Rank	Nation	Gold	Silver	Bronze	Total
1	South Korea (KOR)	2	0	0	2
2	Japan (JPN)	0	1	1	2
3	China (CHN)	0	1	0	1
4	Hong Kong (HKG)	0	0	1	1
Totals (4 entries)		2	2	2	6

=== Medalists ===
Event	Class	Gold	Silver	Bronze
Men's Single Sculls	ASM1x	Park Jun-Ha; South Korea	Huang Cheng; China	Daisuke Maeda; Japan
Mixed Double Sculls	TAMix2x	South Korea (KOR); Jeon Mi-Seok; Lim Sang-Hun	Japan (JPN); Yuno Shinada; Shigeru Komazaki	Hong Kong (HKG); Shek Shing On; Lui Hoi Yu

== Participating nations ==
A total of 27 athletes from 4 nations competed in rowing at the 2014 Asian Para Games:

- China (8)
- Hong Kong (8)
- Japan (3)
- South Korea (8)

== Results ==
=== Men's Single Sculls ===
==== Heat ====
October 20

Rank	Athlete	Time
1	Huang Cheng (CHN)	5:15.48
2	Park Jun-Ha (KOR)	5:18.85
3	Maeda Daisuke (JPN)	5:50.93
4	Samuel Ajmal Victor (HKG)	6:07.92

==== Final ====
October 21

Rank	Athlete	Time
1st place, gold medalist(s)	Park Jun-Ha (KOR)	5:06.94
2nd place, silver medalist(s)	Huang Cheng (CHN)	5:10.57
3rd place, bronze medalist(s)	Maeda Daisuke (JPN)	5:40.06
4	Samuel Ajmal Victor (HKG)	5:50.01

=== Mixed Double Sculls ===
==== Heat ====
October 20

Rank	Team	Time
1	South Korea (KOR) Jeon Mi-Seok; Lim Sang-Hun	5:06.15
2	Hong Kong (HKG) Shek Shing On; Lui Hoi Yu	5:26.49
3	Japan (JPN) Shinada Yuno; Komazaki Shigeru	5:36.24

==== Final ====
October 21

Rank	Team	Time
1st place, gold medalist(s)	South Korea (KOR) Jeon Mi-Seok; Lim Sang-Hun	4:57.62
2nd place, silver medalist(s)	Japan (JPN) Shinada Yuno; Komazaki Shigeru	5:35.78
3rd place, bronze medalist(s)	Hong Kong (HKG) Shek Shing On; Lui Hoi Yu	5:39.88
