= Yuki Kato (athlete) =

Japanese Paralympic athlete

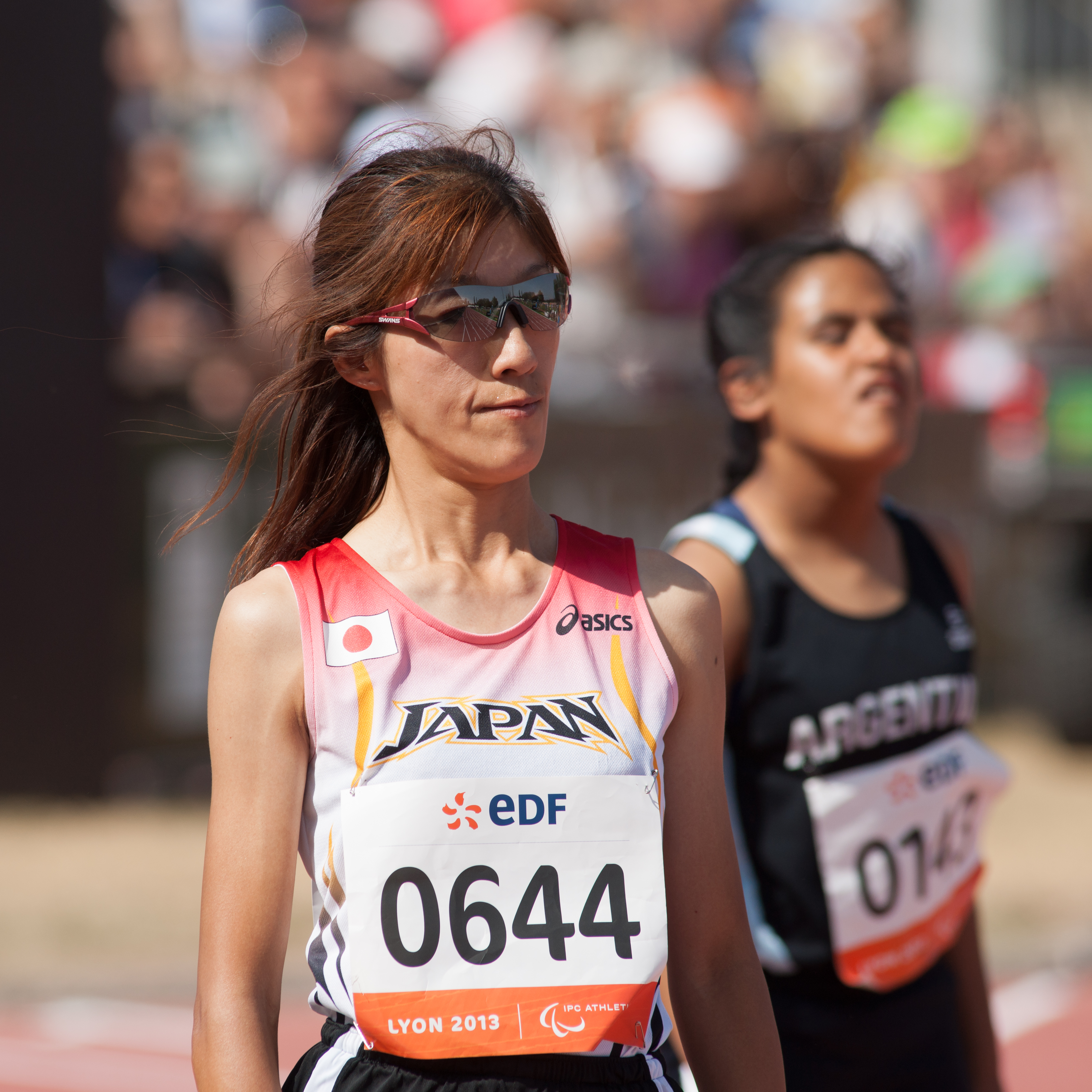
- Yuki Kato at the 2013 IPC Athletics World Championships

Personal information
- Born: 21 September 1973 (age 52) Tokyo, Japan

Sport
- Sport: Paralympic athletics
Medal record
Paralympic athletics
Representing Japan
Paralympic Games
| Bronze medal – third place | 2004 Athens | 100m T36 |
World Championships
| Bronze medal – third place | 2002 Lille | 100m T36 |
Asian Para Games
| Silver medal – second place | 2014 Incheon | 100m T36 |
| Silver medal – second place | 2014 Incheon | 200m T36 |

Yuki Kato (加藤 有希, Katō Yuki) is a Paralympic athlete from Japan competing mainly in category T36 sprints events.

Yuki competed in the 100m and 200m in the 2004, 2008 and 2012 Summer Paralympics winning the bronze medal in the T36 100m in 2004.
