= Japan at the 2014 Asian Para Games =

- IOC code: JPN
- NPC: Japan Paralympic Committee

in Incheon 18–24 October 2014
- Competitors: 298 in 20 sports
- Medals Ranked 3rd: Gold 38 Silver 49 Bronze 56 Total 143

Asian Para Games appearances (overview)
- 2010; 2014; 2018; 2022; 2026

Japan participated in the 2014 Asian Para Games in Incheon, South Korea from 18 to 24 October 2014. Athletes from Japan achieved a total of 143 medals consisting of 38 golds, 49 silvers, and 56 bronzes. The nation finished third at the medal table, one spot behind the host nation South Korea, and two spot behind the defending general champions, China.

== Medalists ==
The following Japan competitors won medals at the Games.

Medal	Name	Sport	Event	Date
Gold	Airi Ike	Swimming	Women's 50 m freestyle S10	19 October
Gold	Keiichi Kimura	Swimming	Men's 100 m butterfly S11	19 October
Gold	Takuro Yamada	Swimming	Men's 200 m individual medley SM9	19 October
Gold	Tadashi Horikoshi	Athletics	Men's 5000 m T12	19 October
Gold	Atsushi Yamamoto	Athletics	Men's long jump T42/T44	19 October
Gold	Shinya Wada	Athletics	Men's 5000 m T11	19 October
Gold	Yurie Kanuma	Cycling	1000 m time trial B	20 October
Gold	Kyosuke Oyama	Swimming	Men's 400 m freestyle S6	20 October
Gold	Remi Watanabe	Swimming	Women's 100 m breaststroke SB14	20 October
Gold	Yasuhiro Tanaka	Swimming	Men's 100 m breaststroke SB14	20 October
Gold	Keiichi Kimura	Swimming	Men's 100 m breaststroke SB11	20 October
Gold	Jumpei Kimura	Swimming	Men's 100 m breaststroke SB6	20 October
Gold	Tomotaro Nakamura	Swimming	Men's 100 m breaststroke SB7	20 October
Gold	Yuka Kawamura	Swimming	Women's 100 m freestyle S1-5	20 October
Gold	Takuro Yamada	Swimming	Men's 100 m freestyle S9	20 October
Gold	Shinya Wada	Athletics	Men's 1500 m T11	20 October
Gold	Takeshi Takemori	Table tennis	Men's singles TT11	21 October
Gold	Naohiko Okumura	Cycling	Road time trial H4-5	21 October
Gold	Takayuki Suzuki	Swimming	Men's 50 m breaststroke SB3	21 October
Gold	Atsushi Yamamoto	Athletics	Men's 100 m T42	21 October
Gold	Yukinobu Ike; Daisuke Ikezaki; Tomoaki Imai; Kazuhiko Kanno; Kotaro Kishi; Shinichi Shimakawa; Kensuke Shoji; Shin Nakazato; Seiya Norimatsu; Masayuki Haga; Takahisa Yamaguchi; Hidefumi Wakayama	Wheelchair rugby	Tournament	22 October
Gold	Takuro Yamada	Swimming	Men's 50 m freestyle S9	22 October
Gold	Daisuke Ejima	Swimming	Men's 100 m backstroke S7	22 October
Gold	Keiichi Kimura	Swimming	Men's 50 m freestyle S11	22 October
Gold	Yukiko Kato	Athletics	Women's discus throw F40/F41/F45/F46	22 October
Gold	Keita Sato	Athletics	Men's 200 m T43/T44	22 October
Gold	Yurie Kanuma	Cycling	Road time trial B	23 October
Gold	Shingo Kunieda; Takashi Sanada	Wheelchair tennis	Men's doubles	23 October
Gold	Mitsuteru Moroishi	Wheelchair tennis	Quad singles	23 October
Gold	Shingo Kunieda	Wheelchair tennis	Men's singles	23 October
Gold	Tomoki Tagawa; Keita Sato; Toru Suzuki; Atsushi Yamamoto	Athletics	Men's 4 × 100 m relay T42-T47	23 October
Gold	Keiichi Kimura	Swimming	Men's 100 m freestyle S11	23 October
Gold	Yukiko Kato	Athletics	Women's shot put F20/F41/F46	23 October
Gold	Keita Sato	Athletics	Men's 100 m T43/T44	23 October
Gold	Shinya Wada	Athletics	Men's 800 m T11	23 October
Gold	Hirokazu Ueyonabaru	Athletics	Men's 800 m T52	24 October
Gold	Makiko Toyoshima	Athletics	Women's 1500 m T20	24 October
Gold	Tadashi Horikoshi	Athletics	Men's 1500 m T12	24 October
Silver	Tatsuyuki Oshiro	Cycling	Individual pursuit B	19 October
Silver	Masashi Ishii	Cycling	Individual pursuit C4-5	19 October
Silver	Naomi Ikinaga	Swimming	Women's 50 m freestyle S11	19 October
Silver	Keiichi Kimura	Swimming	Men's 200 m individual medley SM11	19 October
Silver	Mei Ichinose	Swimming	Women's 200 m individual medley SM5-9	19 October
Silver	Yuki Kato	Athletics	Women's 200 m T36	19 October
Silver	Ayumi Ishii	Judo	Women's -52 kg	20 October
Silver	Takuro Yamada	Swimming	Men's 100 m butterfly S9	20 October
Silver	Takayuki Suzuki	Swimming	Men's 100 m freestyle S5	20 October
Silver	Naomi Ikinaga	Swimming	Women's 100 m freestyle S11	20 October
Silver	Kenta Sato	Swimming	Men's 100 m backstroke S12	20 October
Silver	Airi Ike	Swimming	Women's 100 m freestyle S10	20 October
Silver	Hirokazu Ueyonabaru	Athletics	Men's 200 m T51/T52	20 October
Silver	Yuki Kato	Athletics	Women's 100 m T36	20 October
Silver	Kazumi Nakayama	Athletics	Women's 200 m T52/T53	20 October
Silver	Yusuke Yamanouchi	Athletics	Men's 1500 m T20	20 October
Silver	Yuno Shinada; Shigeru Komazaki	Rowing	Men's double sculls	21 October
Silver	Aramitsu Kitazono	Judo	Men's -90 kg	21 October
Silver	Junko Miwa	Judo	Women's -57 kg	21 October
Silver	Mayumi Yoneda	Judo	Women's -63 kg	21 October
Silver	Keita Kato; Junpei Nara; Kaede Matsunaga	Boccia	Mixed pairs BC3	21 October
Silver	Takuro Yamada	Swimming	Men's 100 m breaststroke SB8	21 October
Silver	Mei Ichinose	Swimming	Women's 100 m breaststroke SB9	21 October
Silver	Noriko Kajiwara	Swimming	Women's 100 m breaststroke SB4	21 October
Silver	Takuro Yamada	Swimming	Men's 400 m freestyle S9	21 October
Silver	Mai Mizukami	Swimming	Women's 100 m breaststroke SB6-8	21 October
Silver	Mai Iwakiri	Athletics	Women's 400 m T20	21 October
Silver	Hirokazu Ueyonabaru	Athletics	Men's 400 m T51/T52	21 October
Silver	Tomomi Sato	Athletics	Women's 100 m T13	21 October
Silver	Kazumi Nakayama	Athletics	Women's 400 m T52/T53	21 October
Silver	Yoshifumi Nagao	Athletics	Men's 100 m T54	21 October
Silver	Mari Kitagawa; Shinya Yamamoto	Sailing	Mixed dinghy 303	22 October
Silver	Naohiko Okumura	Cycling	Road race H4-5	22 October
Silver	Takayuki Suzuki	Swimming	Men's 50 m freestyle S5	22 October
Silver	Chiaki Takada	Athletics	Women's long jump T11/T12	22 October
Silver	Akihito Tanaka; Daisuke Sato; Hiroshi Ochiai; Kento Kato; Kenro Mihara; Naoya Abe; Robertoizumi Sasaki; Ryo Kawamura; Tomonari Kuroda; Yasuhiro Sasaki	Football 5-a-side	Men's tournament	23 October
Silver	Takashi Sanada	Wheelchair tennis	Men's singles	23 October
Silver	Shota Kawano	Wheelchair tennis	Quad singles	23 October
Silver	Naoyoshi Kagayama; Keisuke Kawakabe; Hisato Ozaki; Hiroto Takahashi; Taisei Taniguchi; Yuji Yamada; Yuki Soma; Kazuhiro Kubo; Tetsuya Toda; Ryuta Yoshino; Tatsuhiro Ura; Sho Kuroda; Shotaro Osawa; Hideyuki Yanagi	Football 7-a-side	Men's tournament	23 October
Silver	Yui Kamiji; Kanako Domori	Wheelchair tennis	Women's doubles	23 October
Silver	Mitsuteru Moroishi; Shota Kawano	Wheelchair tennis	Quad doubles	23 October
Silver	Hirokazu Ueyonabaru	Athletics	Men's 100 m T51/T52	23 October
Silver	Takeshi Takemori; Takashi Takeda; Koichi Terasawa	Table tennis	Men's team TT11	24 October
Silver	Tatsuyuki Oshiro	Cycling	Road race B	24 October
Silver	Mari Amimoto; Miho Arikawa; Shoko Furuno; Mayo Hagino; Chihiro Kitada; Yui Kitama; Mayumi Tsuchida; Chika Uemura; Miki Uramoto; Amane Yanagimoto; Erika Yoshida; Izumi Zaima	Wheelchair basketball	Women's tournament	24 October
Silver	Misaki Ari	Athletics	Women's 1500 m T20	24 October
Silver	Ryota Kitamura	Athletics	Men's 400 m T20	24 October
Silver	Atsushi Yamamoto	Athletics	Men's 200 m T42	24 October
Silver	Mitsugu Chiwaki; Shingo Fujii; Reo Fujimoto; Takenori Ishikawa; Hiroaki Kozai; Tetsuya Miyajima; Noriyuki Mori; Hiroyuki Nagata; Satoshi Sato; Akira Toyoshima; Daisuke Tsuchiko; Takato Ueki	Wheelchair basketball	Men's tournament	24 October
Bronze	Hiromi Kobayashi	Powerlifting	Women's –45 kg	19 October
Bronze	Kenta Sato	Swimming	Men's 100 m freestyle S12	19 October
Bronze	Takayuki Suzuki	Swimming	Men's 200 m freestyle S5	19 October
Bronze	Tomomi Ishiura	Swimming	Women's 50 m freestyle S11	19 October
Bronze	Mei Ichinose	Swimming	Women's 50 m freestyle S9	19 October
Bronze	Miki Kamada	Swimming	Women's 100 m backstroke S6-8	19 October
Bronze	Yuri Kitamura	Swimming	Women's 100 m breaststroke SB5	19 October
Bronze	Yuki Morishita	Swimming	Women's 200 m individual medley SM5-9	19 October
Bronze	Yutaka Kumagai	Athletics	Men's 5000 m T12	19 October
Bronze	Tomoki Tagawa	Athletics	Men's 200 m T45/T47	19 October
Bronze	Hiromi Nakada	Athletics	Women's shot put F20	19 October
Bronze	Hidekatsu Takahashi	Judo	Men's –73 kg	20 October
Bronze	Shigeko Koyano; Hiroyuki Kayano	Wheelchair dance sport	Combi standard C2	20 October
Bronze	Shizuka Hangai	Judo	Women's –48 kg	20 October
Bronze	Daisuke Ejima	Swimming	Men's 50 m butterfly S7	20 October
Bronze	Keiichi Kimura	Swimming	Men's 100 m backstroke S11	20 October
Bronze	Chikako Ono	Swimming	Women's 100 m freestyle S11	20 October
Bronze	Miki Kamada	Swimming	Women's 400 m freestyle S6-8	20 October
Bronze	Kuniaki Ishii	Athletics	Men's 1500 m T20	20 October
Bronze	Mirai Kurauchi	Athletics	Women's long jump T20	20 October
Bronze	Daisuke Maeda	Rowing	Men's single sculls	21 October
Bronze	Takashi Takeda	Table tennis	Men's singles TT11	21 October
Bronze	Koyo Iwabuchi	Table tennis	Men's singles TT9	21 October
Bronze	Yusuke Hatsuse	Judo	Men's –81 kg	21 October
Bronze	Kento Masaki	Judo	Men's +100 kg	21 October
Bronze	Masachika Inoue	Table tennis	Men's singles TT7	21 October
Bronze	Kimie Bessho	Table tennis	Women's singles TT5	21 October
Bronze	Kyosuke Oyama	Swimming	Men's 50 m butterfly S6	21 October
Bronze	Airi Ike	Swimming	Women's 400 m freestyle S9-10	21 October
Bronze	Junko Yamane	Swimming	Women's 100 m breaststroke SB14	21 October
Bronze	Saki Takakuwa	Athletics	Women's 100 m T44/T47	21 October
Bronze	Kazumi Nakayama	Athletics	Women's 800 m T52/T53	21 October
Bronze	Masayuki Higuchi	Athletics	Men's 5000 m T53/T54	21 October
Bronze	Masaki Hirooka	Athletics	Men's 200 m T33/T34	21 October
Bronze	Sayaka Makita	Athletics	Women's 400 m T20	21 October
Bronze	Kyosuke Oyama	Swimming	Men's 50 m freestyle S6	22 October
Bronze	Jumpei Kimura	Swimming	Men's 100 m backstroke S7	22 October
Bronze	Takuya Tsugawa	Swimming	Men's 100 m backstroke S14	22 October
Bronze	Airi Ike	Swimming	Women's 100 m backstroke S10	22 October
Bronze	Jun Hiromichi	Athletics	Men's 800 m T53	22 October
Bronze	Kimimasa Onodera	Archery	Men's individual recurve standing	23 October
Bronze	Noriko Ito; Gen Shogaki	Badminton	Mixed doubles SL3–SU5	23 October
Bronze	Hiroshi Uematsu	Lawn bowls	Men's singles B6	23 October
Bronze	Noriko Ito; Akiko Sugino	Badminton	Women's doubles SL3–SU5	23 October
Bronze	Osamu Nagashima	Badminton	Men's singles WH1	23 October
Bronze	Yui Kamiji	Wheelchair tennis	Women's singles	23 October
Bronze	Akiko Adachi; Eiko Kakehata; Aki Koiwai; Yuki Temma; Rie Urata; Haruka Wakasugi	Goalball	Women's tournament	23 October
Bronze	Daisuke Ejima	Swimming	Men's 50 m freestyle S7	23 October
Bronze	Yasuhiro Tanaka	Swimming	Men's 200 m individual medley SM14	23 October
Bronze	Masatoshi Ito; Yuta Kawashima; Hiroshi Kobayashi; Yoshihiro Nakamura; Yoshu Nobusawa; Kento Torii	Goalball	Men's tournament	23 October
Bronze	Mei Ichinose	Swimming	Women's 100 m backstroke S9	23 October
Bronze	Akari Fujiwara	Swimming	Women's 50 m freestyle S7-8	23 October
Bronze	Sachie Akakura; Sachie Awano; Junko Fujii; Emi Kaneki; Satoko Kikuchi; Keiko Nagai; Michiyo Nishiie; Yoko Saito; Mikiko Sumitomo; Yukari Tanahashi	Sitting volleyball	Women's tournament	23 October
Bronze	Tomoki Tagawa	Athletics	Men's 100 m T45/T46/T47	23 October
Bronze	Sayaka Makita	Athletics	Women's 1500 m T20	24 October
Bronze	Toshihiko Oka; Shinichi Yoshida; Kotaro Doi	Table tennis	Men's team TT5	24 October

== Medal summary ==
=== Medals by sport ===
Medals by sport
Sport	1st place, gold medalist(s)	2nd place, silver medalist(s)	3rd place, bronze medalist(s)	Total
Swimming	16	14	22	52
Athletics	14	15	13	42
Wheelchair tennis	3	4	1	8
Cycling	3	4	0	7
Table tennis	1	1	5	7
Wheelchair rugby	1	0	0	1
Judo	0	4	4	8
Wheelchair basketball	0	2	0	2
Rowing	0	1	1	2
Boccia	0	1	0	1
Football 5-a-side	0	1	0	1
Football 7-a-side	0	1	0	1
Sailing	0	1	0	1
Badminton	0	0	3	3
Goalball	0	0	2	2
Archery	0	0	1	1
Lawn bowls	0	0	1	1
Powerlifting	0	0	1	1
Sitting volleyball	0	0	1	1
Wheelchair dance sport	0	0	1	1
Total	38	49	56	143

=== Medals by day ===
Medals by day
Day	Date	1st place, gold medalist(s)	2nd place, silver medalist(s)	3rd place, bronze medalist(s)	Total
1	October 19	6	6	11	23
2	October 20	10	10	9	29
3	October 21	4	15	15	34
4	October 22	6	4	5	15
5	October 23	9	7	14	30
6	October 24	3	7	2	12
Total		38	49	56	143

== See also ==
- Japan at the 2014 Asian Games
