= Football 7-a-side at the 2014 Asian Para Games =

- Football 7-a-side pictogram

Tournament details
- Host country: South Korea
- Dates: 19 – 23 October 2014
- Teams: 4
- Venue: 1 (in 1 host city)

Final positions
- Champions: Iran
- Runners-up: Japan
- Third place: South Korea
- Fourth place: Singapore

Tournament statistics
- Matches played: 8
- Goals scored: 38 (4.75 per match)
- Top scorer(s): Akbari Moslem (IRI) (6); Tiz Bor Hossein (IRI) (6)

7-a-side football at the 2014 Asian Para Games were held in Namdong Asiad Rugby Field, Incheon from 19 – 23 October 2014. There was 1 gold medal in this sport.

== Participating teams and officials ==
=== Qualifying ===
A total of four teams will qualify to compete in the football five a side competition. The host nation (South Korea) automatically qualifies a team. A team may consist of a maximum of 14 athletes.

Means of qualification	Berths	Qualified
Host nation	1	South Korea
Asian Region	3	Iran; Japan; Singapore
Total	4	

=== Squads ===
The individual teams contact following football gamblers on to:

Iran	Japan	South Korea	Singapore
Khazaeipirsarabi Moslem; Rastegarimobin Hashem; Safari Hassan; Tiz Bor Hossein; Hassani Baghi Sadegh; Mehri Farzad; Sohrabibagherabadi Behnam; Gholamhosseinpour Boushehri Ehsan; Jamali Mehdi; Bakhshi Jasem; Atashafrouz Rasoul; Akbari Moslem; Safarikourabbasloo Babak; Coach: Allah Mani Amin	Naoyoshi Kagayama; Keisuke Kawakabe; Hisato Ozaki; Hiroto Takahashi; Taisei Taniguchi; Yuji Yamada; Yuki Soma; Kazuhiro Kubo; Tetsuya Toda; Ryuta Yoshino; Tatsuhiro Ura; Sho Kuroda; Shotaro Osawa; Hideyuki Yanagi; Coach: Junichi Sano	Son Hye-Seong; Doo Sung-Min; Kim Sang-Yul; Jung Phil-Lip; Choi Beom-Jun; Lee Hun-Ju; Oh Kyung-Seok; Heo Chi-Yoon; Jang Jun-Ho; Lee Dong-U; Park Jung-Deuk; Jeong Do-Hyun; Lee Seung-Hwan; Kim Hyung-Soo; Coach: Kim Il-Sub	

== Venues ==
The venues to be used for the World Championships were located in Incheon.

Incheon	Football 7-a-side at the 2014 Asian Para Games is located in South Korea
Stadium: Incheon Namdong Asiad Rugby Field	Football 7-a-side at the 2014 Asian Para Games is located in South Korea
Capacity: Unknown	Football 7-a-side at the 2014 Asian Para Games is located in South Korea

== Format ==
The first round, or group stage, was a competition between the 4 teams in one group, where engaged in a round-robin tournament within itself. In both of the best placed, they play in the final for the tournament, the two last teams play for third place.

Tie-breaking criteria for group play
The ranking of teams in each group was based on the following criteria:
1. Number of points
2. Goal difference
3. Number of goals scored
4. Number of points obtained in matches between tied teams
5. Goal difference in matches between tied teams
6. Number of goals scored in matches between tied teams
7. Drawing of lots

Classification
Athletes with a physical disability competed. The athlete's disability was caused by a non-progressive brain damage that affects motor control, such as cerebral palsy, traumatic brain injury or stroke. Athletes must be ambulant.

Players were classified by level of disability.

- C5: Athletes with difficulties when walking and running, but not in standing or when kicking the ball.
- C6: Athletes with control and co-ordination problems of their upper limbs, especially when running.
- C7: Athletes with hemiplegia.
- C8: Athletes with minimal disability; must meet eligibility criteria and have an impairment that has impact on the sport of football.

Teams must field at least one class C5 or C6 player at all times. No more than two players of class C8 are permitted to play at the same time.

== Group stage ==
In the first group stage have seen the teams in a one group of four teams.

Pos	Team	Pld	W	D	L	GF	GA	GD	Pts	Qualified for
1	Iran	3	2	0	1	13	3	+10	6	Team play for position 1
2	Japan	3	2	0	1	6	3	+3	6	Team play for position 1
3	Singapore	3	1	0	2	3	8	−5	3	Team play for the position 3
4	South Korea	3	1	0	2	4	12	−8	3	Team play for the position 3

Source: IFCPF CP Football 2014 Asian Para Games
Rules for classification: Tie-breaking criteria
2014-10-19
11:00

South Korea	4–0	Singapore
Lee Seung-Hwan 34'; Jang Jun-Ho 40'; Lee Dong-U 47'; Kim Hyung-Soo 53'	Report

Namdong Asiad Rugby Field, Incheon
Referee: Haswell Ross (GBR)
2014-10-19
14:00

Iran	3–0	Japan
Mehri Farzad 17'; Akbari Moslem 29'; Tiz Bor Hossein 49'	Report

Namdong Asiad Rugby Field, Incheon
Referee: Lee Kang Ho (KOR)

2014-10-20
11:00

Japan	2–0	South Korea
Yoshino Ryuta 38'; Yamada Yuji 51'	Report

Namdong Asiad Rugby Field, Incheon
Referee: Huizinga Barry (NED)
2014-10-20
14:00

Iran	0–3 (4-0 real result But technical lose due incorrect substitution)	Singapore
	Report	None

Namdong Asiad Rugby Field, Incheon
Referee: Park Kyun Yong (KOR)

2014-10-21
11:00

South Korea	0–14	Iran
	Report	Akbari Moslem 6', 18', 28'; Tiz Bor Hossein 8', 9', 33'; Atashafrouz Rasoul 13', 31', 50'; Mehri Farzad 16', 48'; Rastegarimobin Hashem 37'; Jamali Mehdi 55', 59'

Namdong Asiad Rugby Field, Incheon
Referee: Haswell Ross (GBR)
2014-10-21
14:00

Singapore	0–4	Japan
	Report	Yoshino Ryuta 6', 53'; Toda Tetsuya 27', 46'

Namdong Asiad Rugby Field, Incheon
Referee: Kim Ji Hye (KOR)

== Finals ==
=== Bronze-medal match ===
2014-10-23
11:00

Singapore	0–3	South Korea
	Report	Lee Dong-U 10'; Lee Seung-Hwan 14', 54'

Namdong Asiad Rugby Field, Incheon
Referee: Huizinga Barry (NED)

=== Gold-medal match ===
2014-10-23
14:00

Iran	5–0	Japan
Akbari Moslem 23', 53'; Tiz Bor Hossein 31', 56'; Rastegarimobin Hashem 35'	Report

Namdong Asiad Rugby Field, Incheon
Referee: Oh Hyeon Jeong (KOR)

== Statistics ==
=== Ranking ===
Rank	Team
Gold medal	Iran
Silver medal	Japan
Bronze medal	South Korea
4.	Singapore

=== Goalscorers ===
6 goals

- Akbari Moslem (IRI)
- Tiz Bor Hossein (IRI)

3 goals

- Mehri Farzad (IRI)
- Atashafrouz Rasoul (IRI)
- Lee Seung-Hwan (KOR)
- Yoshino Ryuta (JPN)

2 goals

- Jamali Mehdi (IRI)
- Rastegarimobin Hashem (IRI)
- Lee Dong-U (KOR)
- Toda Tetsuya (JPN)

1 goal

- Yamada Yuji (JPN)
- Jang Jun-Ho (KOR)
- Kim Hyung-Soo (KOR)

== See also ==
- Football 7-a-side at the 2016 Summer Paralympics
