= Pakistan at the 2014 Asian Para Games =

- IPC code: PAK
- NPC: National Paralympic Committee of Pakistan

in Incheon 18–24 October 2014
- Competitors: 11 in 3 sports
- Medals Ranked 32nd: Gold 0 Silver 0 Bronze 1 Total 1

Asian Para Games appearances (overview)
- 2010; 2014; 2018; 2022

Pakistan participated at the 2014 Asian Para Games which was held in Incheon, South Korea from 18 to 24 October 2014. Pakistan's only medal was a bronze in athletics.

== Medals summary ==
=== Medals by sport ===
Medals by sport
Sport	1st place, gold medalist(s)	2nd place, silver medalist(s)	3rd place, bronze medalist(s)	Total
Athletics	0	0	1	1
Total	0	0	1	1

=== Medalist ===
Medal	Name	Sport	Event
Bronze	Muhammad Awais	Athletics	Men's Javelin Throw F37/38
