= Wheelchair tennis at the 2014 Asian Para Games =

Wheelchair tennis at the 2014 Asian Para Games was held at the Yeorumul Tennis Courts in Incheon, South Korea in October 2014.

== Results ==
Wheelchair tennis at the Asian Para Games

== Medalists ==
Event	Gold	Silver	Bronze
Men's singles	Shingo Kunieda; Japan	Takashi Sanada; Japan	Oh Sang-Oh; South Korea
Men's doubles	Japan (JPN); Shingo Kunieda; Takashi Sanada	South Korea (KOR); Lee Ha-Gel; Oh Sang-ho	Thailand (THA); Suwitchai Merngprom; Wittaya Peem-Mee
Women's singles	Sakhorn Khanthasit; Thailand	Jinlian Huang; China	Yui Kamiji; Japan
Women's doubles	Thailand (THA); Sakhorn Khanthasit; Wanitha Inthanin	Japan (JPN); Kanako Domori; Yui Kamiji	South Korea (KOR); Myung-Hee Hwang; Ju-Yeon Park
Quad singles	Mitsuteru Moroishi; Japan	Shota Kawano; Japan	Kim Kyu-seung; South Korea
Quad doubles	Japan (JPN); Mitsuteru Moroishi; Shota Kawano	South Korea (KOR); Kim Kyu-seung; Ho-Sang Wang	Chinese Taipei (TPE); Chu-Yin Huang; Tzu-Hsuan Huang

== Medal table ==
Rank	Nation	Gold	Silver	Bronze	Total
1	Japan (JPN)	4	3	1	8
2	Thailand (THA)	2	0	1	3
3	South Korea (KOR)	0	2	3	5
4	China (CHN)	0	1	0	1
5	Chinese Taipei (TPE)	0	0	1	1
Totals (5 entries)		6	6	6	18
