= Chun Dae-hong =

South Korean cyclist

Personal information
- Born: 26 July 1976 (age 50)

Cycling career
- Sport: Cycling

Chun Dae-hong (born 26 July 1976) is a South Korean cyclist. He competed in the men's team pursuit at the 1996 Summer Olympics.
