= Myanmar at the 2014 Asian Para Games =

- IPC code: MYA
- NPC: Myanmar Paralympic Sports Federation

in Jakarta 18–25 October
- Medals Ranked 21st: Gold 1 Silver 1 Bronze 5 Total 7

Asian Para Games appearances (overview)
- 2010; 2014; 2018; 2022

Myanmar participated in the 2014 Asian Para Games in Incheon, South Korea, from 18 to 25 October 2014. Athletes from Myanmar competed in Archery, Athletics, Sitting Volleyball and Swimming. Myanmar won 1 gold medal, 1 silver medal, 5 bronze medals and finished 26th in the medal table.Myanmar won first gold medal at Asian Para Games.
