= Karamjyoti Dalal =

Indian para-athlete

Personal information
- Born: 30 November 1987 (age 38) Rohtak, India

Sport
- Sport: Paralympic athletics
Medal record
Representing India
World Championships
Bronze medal – third place	2017 London	Discus throw F55

Karamjyoti Dalal (born 30 November 1987) is an Indian para-athlete from Haryana. She competes in discus throw F55 category. She qualified to represent 2016 Summer Paralympics and 2024 Summer Paralympics.

== Early life and education ==
Dalal is from Rohtak, Haryana. She studied at Maharishi Dayanand University, Rohtak. She represented Haryana in judo and kabaddi at the national level before her accident in 2008 where she fell from the terrace which affected her motor sensation. She is a discus thrower and a coach. She is employed as a coach at the Department of Sports and Youth Affairs, Haryana. She learned of Para Athletics through her aunt.

== Career ==
In 2014, she made her international debut at the Incheon Asian Games where she finished fourth.

At the 2015 World Para Athletics Championships, she placed 4th in the Discus Throw.

She had to compete for her spot at the 2016 Summer Paralympics, after winning the spot for India following her success at the World Championships, Deepa Malik was selected to compete instead, even though her chosen event was Shot put. After this was taken to court, both competed in the Paralympic Games. Unfortunately, she was unable to have a valid throw.

Dalal won a bronze medal in the Discus throw at the 2017 World Para Athletics Championships. She also placed 8th in the shot put. Earlier in March 2017, she won a gold medal at Fazaa International IPC Athletics Grand Prix at Dubai.

At the 2019 World Para Athletics Championships, she placed 6th in the discus throw.

She also won a bronze at the World Para Athletic Championships in London in 2014. She won a silver at the 2022 Asian Para Games held in 2023 at Hangzhou, China.

At the 2023 World Para Athletics Championships she placed 9th in the Discus throw.

Dalal qualified for the discus throw at the 2024 Summer Paralympics alongside teammate Sakshi Kasana. She placed 9th with a season's best of 20.22 metres
