= Vietnam at the 2014 Asian Para Games =

- IOC code: VIE
- NPC: Vietnam Paralympic Association

in Incheon 18–24 October 2014
- Competitors: 45 in 6 sports
- Medals Ranked 10th: Gold 9 Silver 7 Bronze 13 Total 29

Asian Para Games appearances (overview)
- 2010; 2014; 2018; 2022

Youth appearances
- 2009; 2013; 2017

Vietnam participated in the 2014 Asian Para Games in Incheon, South Korea from 19 – 24 October 2014.

Vietnam won 9 gold medals, 7 silver medals and 13 bronze medals, adding up to a total of 29 and finishing tenth on the medal table.

== Competitors ==
Sport	Men	Women	Total
Athletics	8	6	14
Badminton	8	0	8
Powerlifting	2	3	5
Swimming	6	2	8
Ten-pin Bowling	4	0	4
Table tennis	4	2	6
Total	32	13	45

== Medal summary ==
=== Medal by sport ===
Medals by sport
Sport	1st place, gold medalist(s)	2nd place, silver medalist(s)	3rd place, bronze medalist(s)	Total
Athletics	0	1	6	7
Badminton	0	0	2	2
Powerlifting	2	2	0	4
Swimming	7	4	4	15
Ten-pin Bowling	0	0	0	0
Table tennis	0	0	1	1
Total	9	7	13	29

=== Medal by Date ===
Medals by date
Day	Date	1st place, gold medalist(s)	2nd place, silver medalist(s)	3rd place, bronze medalist(s)	Total
1	19 Oct	3	3	1	7
2	20 Oct	2	3	2	7
3	21 Oct	1	0	1	2
4	22 Oct	1	0	2	3
5	23 Oct	2	1	7	10
6	24 Oct	0	0	0	0
Total		9	7	13	29

=== Medalists ===
Medal	Name	Sport	Event	Date
Gold	Lê Văn Công	Powerlifting	Men's -49 kg	19 October
Gold	Nguyễn Bình An	Powerlifting	Men's -54 kg	20 October
Gold	Võ Thanh Tùng	Swimming	Men's 50m Freestyle S5	20 October
Gold	Võ Thanh Tùng	Swimming	Men's 100m Freestyle S5	21 October
Gold	Võ Thanh Tùng	Swimming	Men's 200m Freestyle S5	19 October
Gold	Võ Thanh Tùng	Swimming	Men's 50m Butterfly S5	23 October
Gold	Võ Thanh Tùng	Swimming	Men's 50m Backstroke S5	20 October
Gold	Nguyễn Thành Trung	Swimming	Men's 100m Breaststroke SB4	19 October
Gold	Nguyễn Thành Trung	Swimming	Men's 200m Individual Medley SM5	23 October
Silver	Nguyễn Bé Hậu	Athletics	Men's Javelin Throw - F55/56	20 October
Silver	Đặng Thị Linh Phượng	Powerlifting	Women's -50 kg	20 October
Silver	Châu Hoàng Tuyết Loan	Powerlifting	Women's -55 kg	20 October
Silver	Đỗ Thanh Hải	Swimming	Men's 100m Breaststroke SB5	19 October
Silver	Lê Tiến Đạt	Swimming	Men's 100m Breaststroke SB6	19 October
Silver	Trịnh Thị Bích Như	Swimming	Women's 100m Breaststroke SB5	19 October
Silver	Trịnh Thị Bích Như	Swimming	Women's 50m Butterfly S6	23 October
Bronze	Nguyễn Bé Hậu	Athletics	Men's Discus Throw - F56	23 October
Bronze	Nguyễn Bé Hậu	Athletics	Men's Shot Put - F55/56	23 October
Bronze	Cao Ngọc Hùng	Athletics	Men's Javelin Throw - F57	22 October
Bronze	Hà Thị Huệ	Athletics	Women's Shot Put - F37	23 October
Bronze	Nguyễn Thị Mai	Athletics	Women's Javelin Throw - F37/38	22 October
Bronze	Nguyễn Thị Nhàn	Athletics	Women's Long Jump - T11/12	23 October
Bronze	Phạm Đức Trung	Badminton	Men's Single SL 3	23 October
Bronze	Team men: Phạm Hồng Tuấn; Trần Minh Nhuận	Badminton	Men's Double SL 3,4/ SU5	23 October
Bronze	Võ Huỳnh Anh Khoa	Swimming	Men's 50m Freestyle S9	19 October
Bronze	Võ Huỳnh Anh Khoa	Swimming	Men's 100m Freestyle S9	20 October
Bronze	Võ Huỳnh Anh Khoa	Swimming	Men's 400m Freestyle S9	21 October
Bronze	Team men: Hà Văn Hiệp; Nguyễn Thành Trung; Võ Thanh Tùng; Lê Tiến Đạt	Swimming	Men's 4x50 Relay Medley 20P	20 October
Bronze	Team women: Nguyễn Thị Hoa Phượng; Viết Thị Kim Vân	Table Tennis	Women's Team - TT9-10	24 October

=== Multiple Gold Medalists ===
Name	Sport	Gold	Silver	Bronze	Total
Võ Thanh Tùng	Swimming	5	0	1	6
Nguyễn Thành Trung	Swimming	2	0	1	3
Trịnh Thị Bích Như	Swimming	0	2	0	2
Nguyễn Bé Hậu	Athletics	0	1	2	3
Lê Tiến Đạt	Swimming	0	1	1	2
Võ Huỳnh Anh Khoa	Swimming	0	0	3	3
