= Ankur Dhama =

Indian para-athlete

Personal information
- Nationality: India
- Born: 1994 (age 31–32)
Medal record
Men's athletics
Representing India
Asian Para Games
Gold medal – first place	2022 Hangzhou	Men's 1500 m T11
Gold medal – first place	2022 Hangzhou	Men's 5000 m T11
Silver medal – second place	2014 Incheon	Men's 800 m T11
Bronze medal – third place	2014 Incheon	Men's 1500 m T11
Bronze medal – third place	2014 Incheon	Men's 5000 m T11

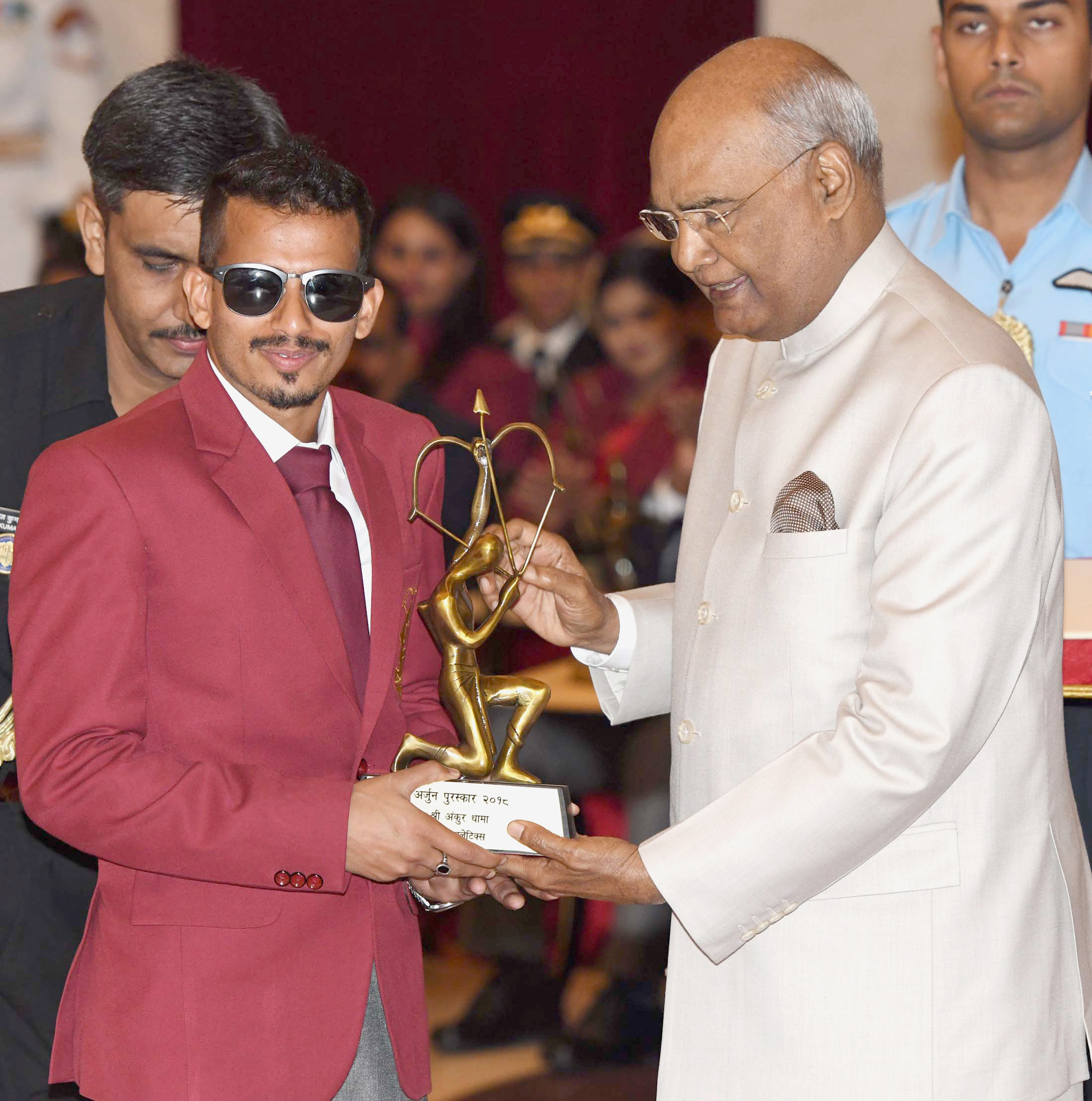
Ram Nath Kovind presenting the Arjuna Award to Ankur Dhama

Ankur Dhama is an Indian para-athlete and long-distance runner. He was awarded the Arjuna Award in 2018.

== Early life ==
Dhama became visually impaired when he was about six years old, after an infection due to Holi colours. Subsequently, he moved to Delhi, where he studied at the JPM Senior Secondary School for the Blind. He went on to study history at the St. Stephen's College. Dhama hails from Khekada.

== Career ==
In the 2014 Asian Para Games, he won one silver and two bronze medals. He was injured during the 2016 Paralympics. In the 2022 Asian Para Games, he won two gold medals.
