= Archery at the 2014 Asian Para Games =

- Paralympic Archery
- Location: South Korea

Archery at the 2014 Asian Para Games was held at Gyeyang Asiad Archery Field in Incheon, South Korea from 20 to 23 October 2014.

== Medals ==
Rank	Nation	Gold	Silver	Bronze	Total
1	Iran (IRI)	4	0	1	5
2	South Korea (KOR)	1	4	3	8
3	China (CHN)	1	2	1	4
4	Iraq (IRQ)	1	0	1	2
5	Hong Kong (HKG)	0	1	0	1
6	Japan (JPN)	0	0	1	1
Totals (6 entries)		7	7	7	21

== Results ==
=== Men's events ===
Event	Gold	Silver	Bronze
Individual compound open	Hadi Nori; Iran	Wu Tung Sang; Hong Kong	Shin Dong-heon; South Korea
Individual W1	Koo Dong-sub; South Korea	Jang Dae-sung; South Korea	Kim Ok-geum; South Korea
Individual recurve standing	Ranjbarkivaj Ebrahim; Iran	Zhao Lixue; China	Kimimasa Onodera; Japan
Team recurve open	Iran (IRI)	South Korea (KOR)	Iraq (IRQ)

=== Women's events ===
Event	Gold	Silver	Bronze
Individual compound open	Al-Murshedi Wurood Basim Ati; Iraq	Jeong Jin-young; South Korea	Kim Mi-soon; South Korea
Individual compound W1/W2	Zahra Nemati; Iran	Ye Jinyan; China	Wu Chunyan; China
Team recurve open	China (CHN)	South Korea (KOR)	Iran (IRI)
