= 2014 Asian Para Games =

Coordinates: 37°58′N 124°39′E

II Asian Para Games
- Host city: Incheon, South Korea
- Motto: A Wave of Passion, Now Begins! (열정의 물결, 이제 시작이다!)
- Nations: 41
- Athletes: 2,497
- Events: 443 in 23 Sport
- Opening: 18 October
- Closing: 24 October
- Opened by: Chung Hong-won; Prime Minister of South Korea
- Closed by: Zainal Abu Zarin; President of the Asian Paralympic Committee
- Torch lighter: Kim Se-jin
- Main venue: Incheon Munhak Stadium

The 2014 Asian Para Games (Korean: 2014년 장애인 아시아 경기대회 or 2014년 장애인 아시안 게임), also known as the 2nd Asian Para Games, was an Asian disabled multi-sport event held in Incheon, South Korea, from 18 to 24 October 2014, 2 weeks after the end of the 2014 Asian Games. This was the first time South Korea hosted the games. Around 4,500 athletes from 41 countries competed in the games which featured 443 events in 23 sports. The games was opened by the Prime Minister Chung Hong-won at the Incheon Munhak Stadium. The final medal tally was led by China, followed by host South Korea and Japan, while Kazakhstan, Myanmar, Singapore, Syria and Qatar won their first ever Asian Para Games gold medal. 24 world and 121 Asian records were broken during the Games.

== Host city ==
Incheon was the second city to host both Asian Games and Para Games after Guangzhou. It was awarded the sporting event in September 2009 by the Asian Paralympic Committee, and signed the Host Contract Agreement on 6 January 2014 in Kuala Lumpur, Malaysia. Incheon Asian Para Games Organising Committee (IAPGOC) was formed to oversee the staging of the event.

== Development and preparation ==
=== Venues ===
(Note:)

Incheon

- Munhak Stadium - Opening and closing ceremonies
- Asiad Main Stadium - Athletics
- Munhak Park Tae-hwan Aquatics Center - Swimming
- Seonhak Hockey Stadium - Football 5-a-side
- Songlim Gymnasium - Sitting volleyball
- Seonhak International Ice Rink - Goalball
- Yeorumul Tennis Courts - Wheelchair tennis
- Gyeyang Asiad Archery Field - Archery
- Gyeyang Gymnasium - Badminton
- Namdong Gymnasium - Boccia
- Ganghwa Dolmens Gymnasium - Wheelchair dance
- Seonhak Gymnasium - Wheelchair rugby
- Ongnyeon International Shooting Range - Shooting
- Namdong Asiad Rugby Field - Football 7-a-side
- Samsan World Gymnasium - Wheelchair Basketball
- Incheon Grand Park Lawnbowl Venue - Lawn bowls
- Incheon International Velodrome - Cycling (track)
- Songdo Road Cycling Course - Cycling (road)
- Dowon Gymnasium - Judo
- Songdo Global University Gymnasium - Table tennis
- Wangsan Sailing Marina - Sailing
- Songdo Global University Concert Hall - Wheelchair fencing
- Moonlight Festival Garden Powerlifting Venue - Powerlifting

Gyeonggi Province

- Anyang Hogye Gymnasium - Bowling
- Hanam Misari Rowing Center - Rowing

== Marketing ==
Jeonopi and Dnopi, the black-faced spoonbill, the official mascot of the games.

=== Logo ===
The logo of the 2014 Asian Para Games was unveiled on 22 December 2010 and is an image of a flame that symbolises the games itself. The blue and green symbolises the determination of the athletes, while the pink and orange flame represents the caring personality of the Asian people in general. All the colours combined on the logo represents the harmony of the people of Asia including the disables. Overall the logo represents the passion and challenging spirit of the games participating athletes as well as the unity of Asian people.

=== Mascot ===
The mascot of the 2014 Asian Para Games was unveiled on 21 June 2012 and is a pair of black-faced spoonbill named, Jeonopi and Dnopi. They were chosen to highlight the games organiser commitment in environmental conservation. Jeonopi represents friendship with people in Asia and the world and the clean natural environment of host city Incheon, while Dnopi represents courage of the participating athletes and hope.

=== Medals ===
The medals of the event had the design of the flame at the front to express the passion and determination of the athletes. The braille letters of the event's name, "Incheon 2014 Asian Para Games is engraved on the back of the medal.

== Ceremonies ==
=== Opening ceremony ===
The opening ceremony was held on 18 October 2014 at the Munhak Stadium with the theme, "Impossible drives us". It was attended by South Korean Prime Minister Chung Hung Won, International Paralympic Committee (IPC) President Sir Philip Craven and Asian Paralympic Committee President Dato Zainal Abu Zarin. The performance was directed by Yoo Joon-gyu and featured K-pop singer Kim Tae-woo. The South Korean prime minister declared the games open, while Lim Woo-geun lit the games cauldron.

=== Closing ceremony ===
The closing ceremony was held on 24 October 2014 at the Munhak Stadium, where the games was declared closed by Asian Paralympic President Dato' Zainal Abu Zarin.

=== Participitating national paralympic committees ===
41 NPCs participated in the event. North Korea compete for the first time, while Bangladesh did not attend due to inactivity which resulted in the termination of its International Paralympic Committee membership the following year.

Participating National Paralympic Committees
- Afghanistan (12)
- Bahrain (10)
- Brunei (11)
- Cambodia (3)
- China (234)
- Hong Kong (125)
- India (87)
- Indonesia (67)
- Iran (200)
- Iraq (66)
- Japan (298)
- Jordan (23)
- Kazakhstan (78)
- North Korea (9)
- South Korea (335)
- Kuwait (28)
- Kyrgyzstan (7)
- Laos (3)
- Lebanon (6)
- Macau (25)
- Malaysia (128)
- Mongolia (61)
- Myanmar (26)
- Nepal (14)
- Oman (12)
- Pakistan (11)
- Palestine (1)
- Philippines (40)
- Qatar (12)
- Saudi Arabia (14)
- Singapore (52)
- Sri Lanka (51)
- Syria (7)
- Chinese Taipei (73)
- Tajikistan (7)
- Thailand (217)
- Timor-Leste (6)
- Turkmenistan (6)
- United Arab Emirates (61)
- Uzbekistan (26)
- Vietnam (45)

== Sports ==
- Archery (7)
- Athletics (166)
- Badminton (15)
- Boccia (7)
- Bowling (12) (Tenpin)
- Cycling (21)
- Football 5-a-side (1)
- Football 7-a-side (1)
- Goalball (2)
- Judo (16)
- Lawn bowls (10)
- Powerlifting (20)
- Rowing (2)
- Sailing (2)
- Shooting (14)
- Swimming (112)
- Table tennis (28)
- Sitting Volleyball (2)
- Wheelchair basketball (2)
- Wheelchair dance sport (8)
- Wheelchair fencing (18)
- Wheelchair rugby (1)
- Wheelchair tennis (6)

== Medal table ==
* Host nation (South Korea)

2014 Asian Para Games medal table
| Rank | NPC | Gold | Silver | Bronze | Total |
|---|---|---|---|---|---|
| 1 | China (CHN) | 174 | 95 | 48 | 317 |
| 2 | South Korea (KOR)* | 72 | 62 | 77 | 211 |
| 3 | Japan (JPN) | 38 | 49 | 56 | 143 |
| 4 | Iran (IRI) | 37 | 52 | 31 | 120 |
| 5 | Uzbekistan (UZB) | 22 | 5 | 4 | 31 |
| 6 | Thailand (THA) | 21 | 39 | 47 | 107 |
| 7 | Malaysia (MAS) | 15 | 20 | 27 | 62 |
| 8 | Hong Kong (HKG) | 10 | 15 | 19 | 44 |
| 9 | Indonesia (INA) | 9 | 11 | 18 | 38 |
| 10 | Vietnam (VIE) | 9 | 7 | 13 | 29 |
| 11 | Kazakhstan (KAZ) | 7 | 6 | 11 | 24 |
| 12 | Iraq (IRQ) | 6 | 6 | 19 | 31 |
| 13 | United Arab Emirates (UAE) | 4 | 12 | 9 | 25 |
| 14 | Chinese Taipei (TPE) | 4 | 10 | 24 | 38 |
| 15 | India (IND) | 3 | 14 | 16 | 33 |
| 16 | Qatar (QAT) | 3 | 0 | 2 | 5 |
| 17 | Mongolia (MGL) | 2 | 1 | 8 | 11 |
| 18 | Saudi Arabia (KSA) | 2 | 1 | 1 | 4 |
| 19 | Sri Lanka (SRI) | 1 | 6 | 7 | 14 |
| 20 | Jordan (JOR) | 1 | 4 | 4 | 9 |
| 21 | Syria (SYR) | 1 | 2 | 2 | 5 |
| 22 | Myanmar (MYA) | 1 | 1 | 5 | 7 |
| 23 | Singapore (SIN) | 1 | 1 | 4 | 6 |
| 24 | Philippines (PHI) | 0 | 5 | 5 | 10 |
| 25 | Kuwait (KUW) | 0 | 4 | 2 | 6 |
| 26 | Turkmenistan (TKM) | 0 | 2 | 1 | 3 |
| 27 | Lebanon (LIB) | 0 | 2 | 0 | 2 |
| 28 | Bahrain (BRN) | 0 | 1 | 2 | 3 |
| 29 | Brunei (BRU) | 0 | 0 | 2 | 2 |
| 29 | Macau (MAC) | 0 | 0 | 2 | 2 |
| 29 | North Korea (PRK) | 0 | 0 | 2 | 2 |
| 32 | Pakistan (PAK) | 0 | 0 | 1 | 1 |
| Totals (32 entries) | | 443 | 433 | 469 | 1,345 |

== See also ==
- 2014 Asian Games

| Preceded by Guangzhou | Asian Para Games; Incheon; II Asian Para Games (2014) | Succeeded by Jakarta |
