= Philippines at the 2014 Asian Para Games =

- IOC code: PHI
- NPC: Philippine Sports Association of the Differently Abled - (PHILSPADA) - NPC Philippines

in Incheon 18–24 October 2014
- Competitors: 40 in 9 sports
- Medals Ranked 23rd: Gold 0 Silver 5 Bronze 5 Total 10

Asian Para Games appearances (overview)
- 2010; 2014; 2018; 2022

Youth appearances
- 2009; 2013; 2017

The Philippines participated at the 2014 Asian Para Games held in Incheon, South Korea from 19 to 24 October 2014.

Philippines also won 5 silver medals, 5 bronze medals and a total of 10 medals, finishing twenty third on the medal table.

== Medalist ==
=== Silver ===
No.	Medal	Name	Sport	Event
1	Silver	Marites Burce	Athletics	Women's Discus Throw (F52/53/54)
2	Silver	Achelle Guion	Powerlifting	Women's -45kg
3	Silver	Samuel Matias; Kim Ian Chi	Ten-Pin Bowling	Mixed Doubles (TPB 9/10 + TPB 9/10)
4	Silver	Julius Jun Obero; Rochelle Canoy	Wheelchair Dancesport	Combi Latin Class 2

=== Bronze ===
No.	Medal	Name	Sport	Event
1	Bronze	Ernie Gawilan	Swimming	Men's 200m Individual Medley SM8
2	Bronze	Ernie Gawilan	Swimming	Men's 100m Freestyle S8
3	Bronze	Ernie Gawilan	Swimming	Men's 400m Freestyle S8
4	Bronze	Josephine Medina	Table Tennis	Women's Singles (TT 8)

=== Multiple ===
Name	Sport	Gold	Silver	Bronze	Total
Ernie Gawilan	Swimming	0	0	3	3

== Medal summary ==
=== By sports ===
Sport	Gold	Silver	Bronze	Total
Powerlifting	0	2	0	2
Athletics	0	1	0	1
Ten-Pin Bowling	0	1	0	1
Wheelchair Dancesport	0	1	0	1
Swimming	0	0	3	3
Cycling	0	0	1	1
Table Tennis	0	0	1	1
Totals (7 entries)	0	5	5	10
