= Uzbekistan at the 2014 Asian Para Games =

Uzbekistan at the 2010 Asian Para Games
- IOC code: UZB
- NPC: Uzbekistan National Paralympic Association

in Incheon 18–24 October 2014
- Medals Ranked 5th: Gold 22 Silver 5 Bronze 4 Total 31

Asian Para Games appearances
- 2010; 2014; 2018; 2022

Uzbekistan participated in the 2014 Asian Para Games in Incheon, South Korea from 18 to 24 October 2014. Athletes from Uzbekistan achieved a total of 31 medals (including 22 gold), and finished fifth at the medal table, one spot behind Iran.
