= Swimming at the 2014 Asian Para Games =

Paralympic swimming at the 2014 Asian Para Games
- Location: Incheon, South Korea
- Dates: 25–29 October

Paralympic swimming at the 2014 Asian Para Games was held in South Korea between 20 and 25 October 2014.

== Results ==
China: 95 medals (48 gold, 34 silver and 13 bronze)

Japan: 52 medals (16 gold, 14 silver, and 22 bronze)

South Korea: (32 medals)

== See also ==
- Swimming at the 2014 Asian Games
