= Chinese Taipei at the 2014 Asian Para Games =

- IOC code: TPE
- NPC: Chinese Taipei Paralympic Committee

in Incheon 18–24 October 2014
- Competitors: 73 in 12 sports
- Medals Ranked 14th: Gold 4 Silver 10 Bronze 24 Total 38

Asian Para Games appearances (overview)
- 2010; 2014; 2018; 2022

Youth appearances
- 2009; 2013

Chinese Taipei participated in the 2014 Asian Para Games in Incheon, South Korea from 18 – 24 October 2014. Seventy-three athletes competed in 12 sports.

Chinese Taipei won 4 gold medals, 10 silver medals, 24 bronze medals for a total of 38 medals, finishing eighth in total medal count on the medal table.
