= Truth (Adelaide newspaper) =

Truth was the name of various weekly newspapers published in Adelaide, South Australia, at times between 1890 and 1964.

== History ==
The first Adelaide newspaper to be titled Truth was published by J. C. Wharton in 1890, and modelled after the London Truth, occupying much the same niche as Quiz, that is to say, humorous, literate and morally conservative; and was short-lived.

The second Adelaide Truth was founded in 1903 by Charles Walter Chandler (c. 1860 – 31 July 1936) and may have had some affiliation with the Sydney Truth of John Norton, and was brash, populist and sensational. E. J. McAlister (who had a printing works in an adjacent building) and Andrew McNamara (nominal publisher) were associates in publishing the paper.

Chandler, who founded the Port Pirie Standard (a predecessor of The Recorder), and the East Torrens Eagle, was no stranger to controversy: in 1900 as owner and editor of the weekly Free Lance and Licensed Victuallers' Gazette, he was sentenced to three months' jail for malicious libel of Emma Bowden, who with her mother could have been identified as the prostitutes described in his column "Darkest Adelaide". This was closely followed by allegations of libel by Maj. Alfred Edward Marston Norton against Chandler and his printer Frederick Wallage Kennedy. They had published in the Lance allegations that the 5th South Australian Imperial Bushmen camping at the Old Exhibition Grounds had 23 females, including a 9-year-old girl, sleeping with them on the night before they embarked for South Africa. Again found guilty, Chandler was sentenced to a further six months.

In 1906 Chandler handed over publication of Truth to Reginald Louis Solomon (1877–1939), retaining editorship, then in September 1906 went through a sham sale of the business to A. Hall, perhaps intending to boost its value in anticipation of a future sale to John Norton. Hall sold the business to Solomon, in another paper transaction. Chandler then sued Solomon, who with associate John Amos had started removing machinery, for trespass, but lost the case. In 1907 Solomon was convicted of publishing an "obscene libel", for the 20 May article in the "Darkest Adelaide" column. Adelaide Truth ceased publication about this time; though it was rumoured that John Norton was interested in starting a South Australian edition of his publication.

The title Truth re-surfaced again in Adelaide in May 1915, published by F. J. Jennings (longtime publisher and printer of The Sport, which republished a number of Truth's articles), but was short-lived.

In 1916 and 1917 Melbourne Truth was sold in Adelaide, published by Harold Gray for Norton's Truth and Sportsman Ltd. Though marked "Adelaide edition", all advertisements were for Melbourne businesses and almost all the news content was from Melbourne. Its purpose may have been to support Norton's anti-Conscription agenda.

From 1925 to 1928 a 'South Australian edition' of Melbourne Truth was published by Joseph Aloysius Patrick Hayes for Ezra Norton's company. Again it contains scandalous stories from all around Australia, mostly about Melbourne, but a fair number of Adelaide stories.

From May 1933 to January 1934, country newsagents were advertising Adelaide Truth, and the State Library of South Australia has a single copy giving the publisher as James Glennon Geoghegan, for Truth and Sportsman Ltd., Melbourne.

From 1941 to 1964 the South Australian edition of Truth was published weekly, no doubt gaining its foothold because of the War. Again it was published by James Geoghegan as an offshoot of Melbourne Truth, but had a generous coverage of local football, cricket and horse racing.

The Melbourne Truth finally wound up in 1994, thirty years after the last South Australian edition was published.

== Elsewhere in SA ==
A Port Pirie edition of Truth may have been published for a year or two during the period 1903–1907. A unique feature was the "We Hear" column, which was placed at the disposal of readers, who for a 6d. (Note: Six pence: a small silver coin; of small but not inconsiderable value, several dollars in today's values) fee could publish "paragraphs containing adroitly concealed libels concerning their 'friends'", but further information is lacking.

== See also ==
- (Brisbane) Truth
- (Sydney) Truth
- (Melbourne) Truth
- (Perth) Truth
- Barrier Daily Truth of Broken Hill, a union newspaper, unconnected with the above
- Pravda, the official newspaper of the Communist Party of the Soviet Union, whose title is the Russian word for "truth"
