= Frenchs Forest Bushland Cemetery =

- Interactive map of Frenchs Forest Bushland Cemetery

Details
- Established: 1932 (first burial 24 April 1940)
- Location: 1 Hakea Avenue, Frenchs Forest, New South Wales
- Country: Australia
- Coordinates: 33.7394°S 151.2019°E
- Size: 22 hectares (54 acres)

Frenchs Forest Bushland Cemetery is located in the suburb of Frenchs Forest and adjacent to the suburb of Davidson, occupying an area of 22 hectares. It is one of the main cemeteries on the Northern Beaches and is the only cemetery in the Forest district. It has been managed since 29 June 2012 by the Northern Metropolitan Cemeteries Trust (known as Northern Cemeteries).

== History ==
On 23 January 1932, the Lands Department gazetted the site and officially dedicated it on 8 October 1937 with the first burial taking place on 24 April 1940. The Anglican Archbishop of Sydney, Howard Mowll, consecrated the Cemetery on 20 February 1955 and Rabbi Israel Porush, senior rabbi at the Great Synagogue, Sydney, consecrated the cemetery on 12 September 1943. Up to 1990 the Cemetery was known as "Frenchs Forest General Cemetery", with the change to the present name being adopted to reflect its native bushland setting.

== Notable interments ==
- Bob Ellis (1942–2016), prominent left-wing screenwriter, journalist, playwright, novelist, political commentator.
- Jack Beasley (1895–1949), ALP and Lang Labor politician, Member of Parliament for West Sydney (1928–46), Minister for Defence and High Commissioner in London.
- Douglas Stewart (1913–1985), poet, short story writer, essayist and literary editor.
- Frank McGuinness (1900–1949), inaugural editor of Ezra Norton's Sydney newspaper The Daily Mirror and father of the journalist P. P. McGuinness.
- Thomas Edwin Pearson (1867–1962), prominent sandsoap manufacturer and early developer of Driza-Bone.
- Percival Richard Cole (1879–1948), history scholar, author and educationist and education civil servant.
- Major General John Murray (1892–1951), Australian Army Officer in two world wars and later Trade Commissioner.
- Clare Greiner (1908–1992), charity and mission worker and mother of NSW Premier Nick Greiner.
- Duncan Campbell (1873–1941), Illabo Shire and Warringah Shire Councillor (1920–32, 1932–41).
- Ben Lexcen AM (born Robert Clyde Miller, 1936–1988), Australian yachtsman and marine architect. He is famous for the winged keel design applied to Australia II which, in 1983, became the first non-American yacht to win the prestigious America's Cup in 132 years.
- Heddington Joseph Jones, youngest son of Anne Jones, proprietor of Glenrowan Inn. He was present at the famous siege and capture of Ned Kelly.
- John Shaw (1902–1983), civil engineer and public servant.
