= John Hetherington (author) =

Australian journalist, author and military historian

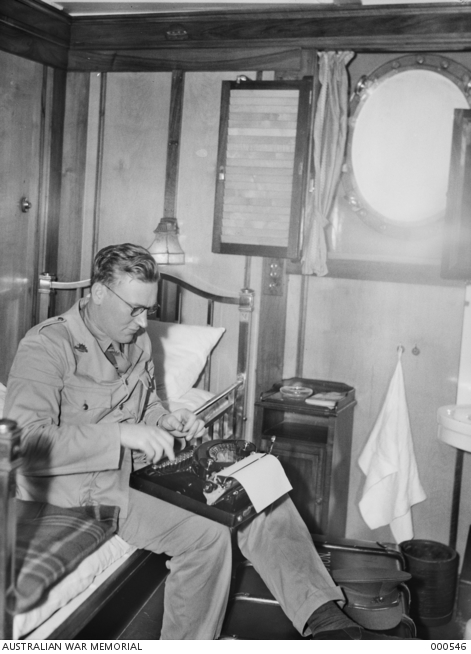
- Born: Jack Aikman Hetherington; 3 October 1907; Sandringham, Victoria
- Died: 17 September 1974 (aged 66); Parkville, Victoria
- Awards: Officer of the Order of the British Empire (1972)

Academic work
- Institutions: Herald and Weekly Times
- Main interests: Australian biographies
- Notable works: Blamey (1954), Melba (1967)

John Hetherington OBE (3 October 1907 – 17 September 1974) was an Australian journalist, author and military historian. He is best known for his biographies of Thomas Blamey, Nellie Melba and Norman Lindsay. He had a long career as a newspaper journalist and editor. During the Second World War, he was a war correspondent who covered the North African campaign, the Battle of Greece and the Battle of Normandy, landing on the beach on D-Day.

== Early life and career ==
Jack Aikman (John) Hetherington was born on 3 October 1907 in the Melbourne suburb of Sandringham, Victoria, the younger of the two sons of Hector Hetherington, a grocer, and his wife Agnes, née Bowman. His brother, Will, was three years older. He attended Sandringham State School, commencing in January 1914, and then All Saints Grammar School in St Kilda on a chorister's scholarship, starting in January 1917.

Hetherington left school at the age of 16 to join the Evening Sun newspaper, and his first short story was published in The Australasian in 1925. That year he became a journalist at The Herald and Weekly Times, where he wrote a daily column and edited the Sun News-Pictorial Saturday magazine. In 1935, he went to the United Kingdom, where he worked in London as a sub-editor and wire service reporter and wrote articles about the Australian outback for popular magazines. He worked for Australian Associated Press in the United States for six months in 1938 while on the way back to Australia to rejoin the staff of The Herald and Weekly Times.

== War correspondent ==
In January 1940, shortly after the outbreak of the Second World War, he became a war correspondent. He sailed with the first convoy carrying the Second Australian Imperial Force (AIF) to the Middle East, where he covered the activities of Australian forces in the Western Desert campaign, including the Battle of Bardia, the capture of Tobruk, and the Battle of Beda Fomm. He then accompanied the Australian forces in the Battle of Greece. In addition to newspapers in Australia, his reports were published by The Times, The Manchester Guardian and The Yorkshire Post in the UK and The New York Times and the North American Newspaper Alliance in the United States. His account of the fighting in Greece provoked criticism of the campaign in the UK.

After covering the Second Battle of El Alamein, Hetherington returned to Australia with the 9th Division. He married Olive Meagher née McLeish, a 45-year-old divorcee, at the office of the Government Statist and Actuary on 15 March 1943. They had a son. He wrote a book on the Battle of Crete, Air-Borne Invasion (1943), and one on The Australian Soldier (1943). In 1944, The Herald sent him to the UK to cover the Western Allied invasion of North West Europe. He landed on the beach at Normandy on the evening of D-Day, and covered the British Second Army's fighting in the Normandy campaign, the subsequent breakout and pursuit across France and Belgium, and the airborne Operation Market Garden in Holland. Invalided back to Australia, he wrote an unpublished account of the Second Army's operations, and a novel, The Winds Are Still (1947), based on his experiences in Greece, which won first prize for in the war story section of the Sydney Morning Herald's literary competition.

== Later life ==
In 1945, Hetherington became editor in chief of the News Limited publications in Adelaide, which included The News, The Mail and Radio Call. He disliked administration and in 1949 returned to Melbourne as a feature-writer for The Herald. He became deputy editor of The Argus in 1952, and then, in 1954, a columnist for The Age, with a column titled "Collins Street Calling". He began writing biographical books, starting with Blamey (1954), about Field Marshal Sir Thomas Blamey. This was followed by Nine Profiles (1960), Forty-Two Faces (1962), Australian Painters (1963) and Uncommon Men (1965). He wrote Pillars of the Faith about Victorian clerics and Melba about the Australian soprano opera singer Dame Nellie Melba, which won the Sir Thomas White prize for biography. In 1971, he wrote an autobiographical work, The Morning was Shining. His final work was The Embattled Olympian (1973), a biography of Norman Lindsay.

Hetherington legally changed his name by deed poll to John Hetherington, a name he had long used in his bylines, in 1956. His first wife died in 1966, and on 25 July 1967 he married Mollie Roger Maginnis, a fellow journalist, in St George's Anglican Church in Malvern, Victoria. He was appointed an Officer of the Order of the British Empire in the 1972 New Year Honours "for services to Australian literature". He died at Royal Melbourne Hospital in Parkville, Victoria, on 17 September 1974 and his remains were cremated.
