= Athletics at the 2004 Summer Paralympics – Women's 400 metres T38 =

Women's 400m T38 at the XII Paralympic Games
- Venue: Athens Olympic Stadium
- Dates: 27 September 2004
- Competitors: 7 from 6 nations
- Winning time: 1:05.41

Medalists
1st place, gold medalist(s)		Katrina Webb	Australia
2nd place, silver medalist(s)		Wang Fang	China
3rd place, bronze medalist(s)		Inna Dyachenko	Ukraine

The Women's 400m race for class T38 athletes with cerebral palsy at the 2004 Summer Paralympics were held in the Athens Olympic Stadium on 27 September. The event consisted of a single race, and was won by Katrina Webb, representing Australia.

== Final round ==
27 Sept. 2004, 19:00

Rank	Athlete	Time	Notes
1st place, gold medalist(s)	Katrina Webb (AUS)	1:05.41	PR
2nd place, silver medalist(s)	Wang Fang (CHN)	1:06.96	
3rd place, bronze medalist(s)	Inna Dyachenko (UKR)	1:07.49	
4	Evgenia Trushnikova (RUS)	1:07.99	
5	Lisa McIntosh (AUS)	1:09.94	
6	Graca Fernandes (POR)	1:10.89	
7	Dominique Vogel (RSA)	1:19.94	
