= Athletics at the 2004 Summer Paralympics – Women's 200 metres T34–37 =

Women's 200m races for athletes with cerebral palsy at the 2004 Summer Paralympics were held in the Athens Olympic Stadium. Events were held in three disability classes, each completed in a single race.

== T34 ==
Women's 200m T34 at the XII Paralympic Games
- Venue: Athens Olympic Stadium
- Dates: 25 September 2004
- Competitors: 5 from 4 nations
- Winning time: 34.55

Medalists
| 1st place, gold medalist(s) | | Chelsea Clark | Canada |
| 2nd place, silver medalist(s) | | Debbie Brennan | Great Britain |
| 3rd place, bronze medalist(s) | | Noriko Arai | Japan |

The T34 event was won by Chelsea Clark, representing Canada.

=== Final Round ===
25 Sept. 2004, 18:30

| Rank | Athlete | Time | Notes |
|---|---|---|---|
| 1st place, gold medalist(s) | Chelsea Clark (CAN) | 34.55 | |
| 2nd place, silver medalist(s) | Debbie Brennan (GBR) | 35.39 | |
| 3rd place, bronze medalist(s) | Noriko Arai (JPN) | 36.08 | |
| 4 | Chelsea Lariviere (CAN) | 37.28 | |
| 5 | Maria F. Rosales (ARG) | 48.52 | |

== T36 ==
Women's 200m T36 at the XII Paralympic Games
- Venue: Athens Olympic Stadium
- Dates: 26 September 2004
- Competitors: 8 from 7 nations
- Winning time: 28.60

Medalists
| 1st place, gold medalist(s) | | Wang Fang | China |
| 2nd place, silver medalist(s) | | Hazel Robson | Great Britain |
| 3rd place, bronze medalist(s) | | Eriko Kikuchi | Japan |

The T36 event was won by Wang Fang, representing China.

=== Final Round ===
26 Sept. 2004, 18:10

| Rank | Athlete | Time | Notes |
|---|---|---|---|
| 1st place, gold medalist(s) | Wang Fang (CHN) | 28.60 | WR |
| 2nd place, silver medalist(s) | Hazel Robson (GBR) | 31.98 | |
| 3rd place, bronze medalist(s) | Eriko Kikuchi (JPN) | 32.30 | |
| 4 | Yuki Kato (JPN) | 32.63 | |
| 5 | Eleni Samaritaki (GRE) | 32.90 | |
| 6 | Yu Chun Lai (HKG) | 33.90 | |
| 7 | Saida Nurpeissova (KAZ) | 42.74 | |
| 8 | Eunice Njoroge (KEN) | 46.21 | |

== T37 ==
Women's 200m T37 at the XII Paralympic Games
- Venue: Athens Olympic Stadium
- Dates: 22 September 2004
- Competitors: 5 from 5 nations
- Winning time: 30.14

Medalists
| 1st place, gold medalist(s) | | Evgenia Trushnikova | Russia |
| 2nd place, silver medalist(s) | | Lisa McIntosh | Australia |
| 3rd place, bronze medalist(s) | | Isabelle Foerder | Germany |

The T37 event was won by Evgenia Trushnikova, representing Russia.

=== Final Round ===
22 Sept. 2004, 17:55

| Rank | Athlete | Time | Notes |
|---|---|---|---|
| 1st place, gold medalist(s) | Evgenia Trushnikova (RUS) | 30.14 | |
| 2nd place, silver medalist(s) | Lisa McIntosh (AUS) | 30.56 | |
| 3rd place, bronze medalist(s) | Isabelle Foerder (GER) | 30.76 | |
| 4 | Dominique Vogel (RSA) | 32.86 | |
| 5 | Oksana Krechunyak (UKR) | 1:00.99 | |
