= Frank McGuinness (journalist) =

Australian newspaper editor (1900–1949)

- Born: Francis Vincent McGuinness; 13 October 1900
- Died: 30 September 1949 (aged 48); Ryde, New South Wales, Australia
- Occupation: Newspaper editor

Francis Vincent McGuinness (13 October 1900 – 30 September 1949) was an Australian newspaper editor and father of the journalist P. P. McGuinness.

== Biography ==
Frank started off his career in journalism at the Geelong Advertiser but was sacked after 'decking' his editor. He also worked for three years at The Farmers' Advocate, a metropolitan daily newspaper launched in 1917 as a mouthpiece for the newly formed Victorian Farmers' Union, of which his father Michael McGuinness was a leading member. Frank also worked for the Melbourne Herald, and The Sun News Pictorial.

From 1931 Frank was the editor of the weekly tabloid Melbourne newspaper The Truth, which was owned by Ezra Norton. In December 1939 Frank was called as a witness at the royal commission investigating allegations of bribery to block the passing of the Milk Board Bill and Money-lenders Bill through the Victorian parliament. Frank refused to reveal the source behind articles he had written in September 1939 which suggested that certain persons were collecting funds for the purpose of bribing members of the Parliament. He was subsequently fined £15 by the Victorian Supreme Court for an offence against the Evidence Act 1928 (Vict) for refusing to answer questions without a lawful excuse.

The ruling was appealed to the High Court in February 1940 but was unanimously dismissed in April of the same year. The ruling by the High Court set a legal precedent that the press did not have the privilege to protect its sources. On 21 March 2011 the Australian Parliament passed The Evidence Amendment (Journalists' Privilege) Bill, which allows journalists to protect the identity of anonymous sources unless a court decides disclosure is in the public interest.

In 1941 Frank moved to Sydney to become the inaugural editor of The Daily Mirror, a Sydney-based afternoon newspaper founded by Ezra Norton. As editor of The Daily Mirror, Frank fought against censorship imposed by the government during the Second World War that the government said was "detrimental to the war effort".

On 30 September 1949, while walking near his home in 1 Llewellyn Street, Rhodes, Frank collapsed on a seat at a bus stop. He was rushed to Ryde District Hospital but was dead on arrival. He was interred in the Frenchs Forest Bushland Cemetery.
