= Athletics at the 2004 Summer Paralympics – Women's 100 metres T34–37 =

Women's 100m races for athletes with cerebral palsy at the 2004 Summer Paralympics were held in the Athens Olympic Stadium. Events were held in three disability classes, each completed in a single race.

== T34 ==
Women's 100m T34 at the XII Paralympic Games
- Venue: Athens Olympic Stadium
- Dates: 22 September 2004
- Competitors: 5 from 4 nations
- Winning time: 19.68

Medalists
1st place, gold medalist(s)		Chelsea Clark	Canada
2nd place, silver medalist(s)		Chelsea Lariviere	Canada
3rd place, bronze medalist(s)		Debbie Brennan	Great Britain

The T34 event was won by Chelsea Clark, representing Canada.

=== Final Round ===
22 Sept. 2004, 20:20

Rank	Athlete	Time	Notes
1st place, gold medalist(s)	Chelsea Clark (CAN)	19.68	WR
2nd place, silver medalist(s)	Chelsea Lariviere (CAN)	19.83	
3rd place, bronze medalist(s)	Debbie Brennan (GBR)	20.23	
4	Noriko Arai (JPN)	20.50	
5	Maria F. Rosales (ARG)	24.81	

== T36 ==
Women's 100m T36 at the XII Paralympic Games
- Venue: Athens Olympic Stadium
- Dates: 22 September 2004
- Competitors: 8 from 7 nations
- Winning time: 13.88

Medalists
1st place, gold medalist(s)		Wang Fang	China
2nd place, silver medalist(s)		Hazel Robson	Great Britain
3rd place, bronze medalist(s)		Yuki Kato	Japan

The T36 event was won by Wang Fang, representing China.

=== Final Round ===
22 Sept. 2004, 20:35

Rank	Athlete	Time	Notes
1st place, gold medalist(s)	Wang Fang (CHN)	13.88	WR
2nd place, silver medalist(s)	Hazel Robson (GBR)	15.31	
3rd place, bronze medalist(s)	Yuki Kato (JPN)	15.53	
4	Eriko Kikuchi (JPN)	15.72	
5	Yu Chun Lai (HKG)	15.77	
6	Eleni Samaritaki (GRE)	15.78	
7	Saida Nurpeissova (KAZ)	17.84	
8	Eunice Njoroge (KEN)	22.18	

== T37 ==
Women's 100m T37 at the XII Paralympic Games
- Venue: Athens Olympic Stadium
- Dates: 26 September 2004
- Competitors: 6 from 5 nations
- Winning time: 14.39

Medalists
1st place, gold medalist(s)		Oksana Krechunyak	Ukraine
2nd place, silver medalist(s)		Isabelle Foerder	Germany
3rd place, bronze medalist(s)		Lisa McIntosh	Australia

The T37 event was won by Oksana Krechunyak, representing Ukraine.

=== Final Round ===
26 Sept. 2004, 20:20

Rank	Athlete	Time	Notes
1st place, gold medalist(s)	Oksana Krechunyak (UKR)	14.39	
2nd place, silver medalist(s)	Isabelle Foerder (GER)	14.64	
3rd place, bronze medalist(s)	Lisa McIntosh (AUS)	14.81	
4	Evgenia Trushnikova (RUS)	14.96	
5	Dominique Vogel (RSA)	15.54	
6	Amanda Fraser (AUS)	16.56	
