= Longson =

Surname list

Longson is a surname. Notable people with the surname include:

- Harry Longson (1907–?), South Australian caricaturist
- O'Neil Longson, American poker player
- Sam Longson (died 1989), British businessman
- Wild Bill Longson, born Willard Rowe Longson (1906–1982), American wrestler
