= Max Leslie (footballer) =

Australian rules footballer

Personal information
- Full name: Max Raymond Leslie
- Born: 26 June 1922; South Melbourne, Victoria
- Died: 19 February 1966 (aged 43); Sandringham, Victoria
- Original team: St Kilda District
- Height: 180 cm (5 ft 11 in)
- Weight: 83 kg (183 lb)

Playing career^{1}
Years	Club	Games (Goals)
1945	Geelong	14 (4)
1946	St Kilda	8 (1)
Total		22 (5)
- ^{1} Playing statistics correct to the end of 1946.

Max Raymond Leslie (26 June 1922 – 19 February 1966) was an Australian rules footballer who played with Geelong and St Kilda in the Victorian Football League (VFL).
