= Truth (Sydney newspaper) =

Newspaper

- Type: Weekly newspaper
- Founder: William Nicholas Willis
- Founded: August 1890; 135 years ago
- Ceased publication: 1958
- Language: English
- City: Sydney, New South Wales
- Country: Australia
- Sister newspapers: The Daily Mirror

Truth was a newspaper published in Sydney, Australia. It was founded in August 1890 by William Nicholas Willis and its first editor was Adolphus Taylor. In 1891 it claimed to be "The organ of radical democracy and Australian National Independence" and advocated "a republican Commonwealth created by the will of the whole people", but from its early days it was mainly a scandal sheet. Subsequent owners included Adolphus Taylor, Paddy Crick and John Norton.

Norton established several subsidiaries, including the Sportsman (1900), the Brisbane Truth (1900), the Melbourne Truth (1902) and the Perth Truth (1903 to 1931), and an Adelaide Truth (1916–1964).

== Ezra Norton ==
Although John Norton disinherited his estranged wife, Ada Norton and his son Ezra Norton at his death in 1916 (with the bulk of his estate going to his daughter, Joan), Mrs Norton persuaded the New South Wales Parliament to backdate the new Testator's Family Maintenance Act to take effect before Norton's death. Under this legislation, she succeeded in having his will rewritten in 1920 so that she and Ezra Norton each received a third of his inheritance, allowing Ezra Norton to gain control of the Truth group.

== End of Truth ==
In January 1941, Ezra Norton launched The Daily Mirror. In October 1958, he replaced the Sydney Truth with the Sunday Mirror. In December 1958, Norton and the other shareholders sold their shares in Truth and Sportsman Ltd to the Fairfax group, which on-sold it to Rupert Murdoch's News Ltd. The Sunday Mirror continued to be published until 1977 when it was renamed the Sunday which in turn ceased circulation on 7 Oct 1979. The Truth (Melbourne) which was initially the Victorian edition of the Truth (Sydney) continued publication until 15 May 1993.

== Digitisation ==
The paper has been digitised as part of the Australian Newspapers Digitisation Program project of the National Library of Australia.

== See also ==
- List of newspapers in Australia
- List of newspapers in New South Wales
