= Truth (Perth newspaper) =

Former newspaper in Perth, Western Australia

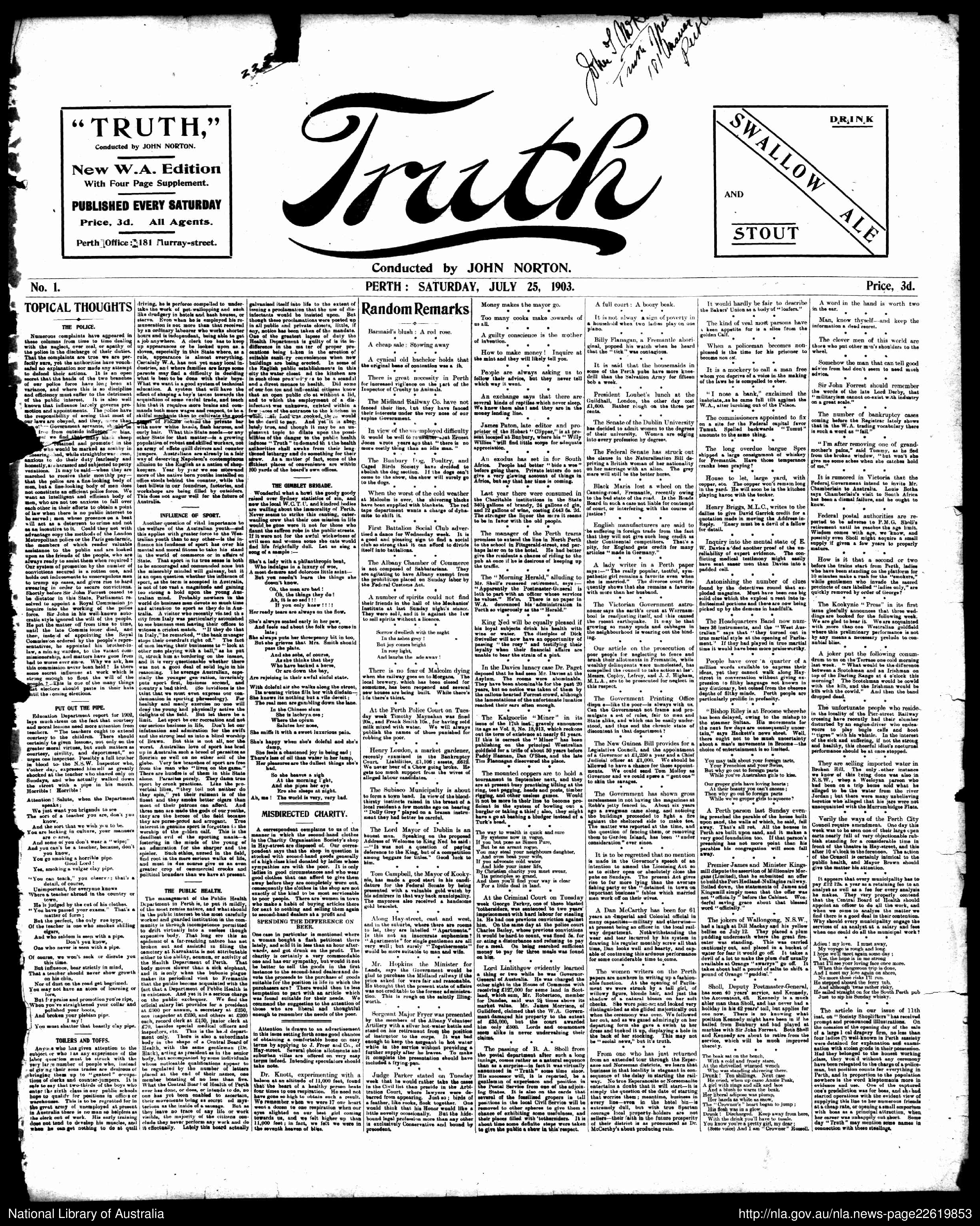
- Front cover of the first issue of Truth
- Founded: 1903
- Ceased publication: 1931
- Language: English
- Headquarters: Perth, Western Australia

Truth was a weekly English-language newspaper published in Perth, Western Australia from 25 July 1903 until 29 March 1931.

== Background ==
Until 1916, the masthead read "conducted by John Norton"; then between 1916 and 1920, it read "conducted by John Norton's Trustees".

Truth was an established newspaper published in Sydney owned by William Willis, Adolphus Taylor and Patrick Crick. Norton worked for Truth and became editor and part-owner in 1891, but he was soon dismissed for repeated drunkenness. Through extensive litigation, Norton acquired the newspaper in 1896. The content of Truth became even more sensational under Norton's ownership. Truth newspapers were published in New South Wales, Victoria and Queensland before the Western Australian edition was established in 1903. For a few months prior to this, a Western Australian edition had been published in Melbourne.

== Availability ==
Issues (1903 – 1931) of this newspaper have been digitised as part of the Australian Newspapers Digitisation Program of the National Library of Australia in cooperation with the State Library of Western Australia.

Printed and microfilm copies of Truth are also available at the State Library of Western Australia.

== See also ==
- List of newspapers in Australia
- List of newspapers in Western Australia
- Truth (Sydney newspaper)
- Truth (Melbourne newspaper)
- Truth (Adelaide newspaper)
