= Hazel Robson =

British Paralympic athlete

Medal record

Track and field (athletics)

Representing United Kingdom

Paralympic Games
Gold medal – first place	2000 Sydney	100 metres – T36
Silver medal – second place	2004 Athens	100 metres – T36
Silver medal – second place	2004 Athens	200 metres – T36
Bronze medal – third place	2008 Beijing	100 metres – T36
Bronze medal – third place	2008 Beijing	200 metres – T36

Hazel Robson (born 22 August 1979) is a Paralympian athlete from Great Britain competing mainly in category T36 sprint events.

Hazel competed in the 2004 Summer Paralympics in Athens in the 200m and 400m having won the gold medal in the 100m in Sydney four years earlier. Four years later, competing under her married name of Simpson, she failed to defend the 100m title finishing second behind China's Wang Fang who also beat her into second in the 200m.
