= Clarry Neate =

South Australian racehorse trainer and cartoonist

John Clarence Neate (28 June 1904 – 1972), generally known as Clarrie or Clarry Neate, was a South Australian racehorse trainer and cartoonist, known for caricatures of sporting identities in The Sport weekly newspaper.

== History ==
Neate was born in Caltowie, South Australia the son of John Thomas Neate (1878–1960) and Mignonette May Synnett, who married in 1903

He was a capable jockey, especially over hurdles, and trained several horses for Ted Baker (c. 1873 – 12 July 1936), and Fred Jennings (c. 1882 – 18 November 1948) Jennings was owner and editor of The Sport, which published many of Neate's drawings. He also painted in oils and watercolors. At least one example, of a downed Japanese bomber, survives.

He had stables in Kent Town until 1934, then transferred to Gawler. Apprentice jockey Jack Moyse was associated with him until the onset of World War II, then transferred his indentures to Morphettville trainer Albert "Ab" Macdonald, a brief but successful partnership.

Neate enlisted with the 2nd AIF and as Corporal Neate was Mentioned in Despatches for distinguished services while map-making for the Intelligence Department in New Guinea.

He succeeded Syd Ferry (1877–1945), son of Seth, as instructor of apprentice jockeys at the SAJC Apprentices' School, initiated in 1934 by A. V. Benson on behalf of Adelaide's nine jockey clubs.

From 1947 he also served as deputy race steward and stipendiary steward at various race meetings.

== Family ==
Neate married Gladys Mabel Morgan (1906– ) in 1926. Their family includes

- Ross Clarence Neate (11 September 1926 – 2007)

They divorced in 1946; he married again, on 17 July 1954, to Mrs Mary Alice Strangways, née Smallacombe (9 September 1917 – 9 July 1982)

== See also ==
Another artist in the same field was Harry Longson, who drew for the Radio Call and (later) The Advertiser.
