= Chelsea Clark =

Chelsea Clark may refer to:

- Chelsea Clark (athlete)
- Chelsea Clark (actress)
