= Chelsea Lariviere =

Canadian Paralympic athlete

Personal information
- Born: Toronto, Ontario
Medal record
Paralympic athletics
Representing Canada
Paralympic Games
Silver medal – second place	2004 Athens	100 metres - T34

Chelsea Lariviere is a paralympic athlete from Canada competing mainly in category T34 sprint events.

== Career ==
Lariviere competed with Team Canada from 1999 until 2006. In 2004 where she gained her silver medal in the 100m behind fellow Canadian Chelsea Clark. She also earned a silver medal in the women's 400 metres and two bronze medals in the 100 and 200 meter race at 2002 World Para Athletics Championships. She later partnered with a Paralympics Ontario program to raise awareness of programs aimed at children with disabilities.

Following the 2006 IPC Athletics World Championships, Lariviere decided to retire from wheelchair athletics and complete her Honours Bachelor of Arts psychology degree at Carleton University.
