= Harry Longson =

Australian Cartoonist

Henry Alfred Longson (born 26 March 1907) was a South Australian artist known for his caricatures of people in the news, mostly sporting and entertainment figures.

== History ==
Longson was born in Carlton, Victoria, son of Henry Abraham Longson (1868 – 19 January 1915) and grandson of Edward Charles Longson (22 September 1831 – 14 April 1919) of the Stock Exchange, Adelaide.

His father was educated at North Adelaide Grammar School and studied Law at the University of Adelaide. He and fellow-clerk John Joseph Pascoe were in 1890 organisers of the "Commercial Bank of South Australia Assets Distribution Company", an Art Union they set up to dispose of the assets of that (failed) bank. It is likely they moved their operation to Broken Hill or some other city where such a scheme was legal.
He was later secretary of Cliffs Racing Club, which in 1900 he was charged with embezzling.

In January 1942 he was driving a taxi and living at Donegal Street, Norwood. He married Helen Salvano (1918–1962) of Peterborough on 26 December 1942.

He began drawing for the Radio Call weekly magazine in 1937 or earlier.

Caricatures of SA horse racing identities published 1948–49 include J. Bourke, J. Bromley, Bob Carling, Johnny Cilento, W. Cook, Bill Cutler, Ned Dullen, Noel Fisher, Jack Hawthorn, L. Heath, Graham Heagney, Tom Hoppo, George Jesser, Lindsay Jones, J. Keating, Arthur J. Lee, Ab Macdonald, Clarrie Neate, F. Oakey, Jack Purtell, Harrie Smith, and C. H. Wood.

He wrote occasional pieces for The News. and for radio "Kangaroos in the Clouds", a history of Australian aviation..

He enlisted with the 2nd AIF around 1940, attended the wedding of a niece in 1942, and was ranked sergeant in 1944. The latest references found are dated 1988 and 1992, when he may have been working for Messenger Press, and have him living in Belair.

== Other interests ==
Longson enjoyed harness racing and was owner of a successful horse, Alhambra, trained by T. Gilbert.
