= Ding Dyason =

Australian academic and historian of medicine (1919–1989)

Diana Joan "Ding" Dyason (1919–1989) was an Australian lecturer and historian of medicine with major teaching and life-long research interests in public health and germ theory. She is most notable in the significant impact she had in her scholarly discipline. As a woman who firstly worked in the traditional roles of research assistant and demonstrator in the non-traditional discipline of science, Dyason progressed to become a leader at a major Australian university, overcoming barriers of gender and culture at a national and international level, receiving awards and honors in the process. She broke through the gender-based 'glass ceiling' in the academic workplace to establish and develop the new interdisciplinary field of study of the History and Philosophy of Science that brings together The Two Cultures of the sciences and the humanities.

She was a leader in the development of the new discipline of the History and Philosophy of Science in both Australia and internationally, and she overcame barriers as a woman in the non-traditional academic role of Head of Department and in the difficult cross-disciplinary task of bringing together the arts and sciences.

== Early life ==
Dyason was born on 10 July 1919 in Sandringham, Melbourne to wealthy influential parents, the second child of Edward Clarence Evelyn Dyason and Anne Elizabeth, née McClure, whom she described as 'sophisticated, free-thinking and rather unusual people'. Her father was a successful businessman, mining engineer and humanist with a strong belief in the power of reason, who enjoyed the company of academics, including his brother-in-law, Sir Ernest Scott, a professor of history at the University of Melbourne. She applied herself to her academic studies, especially science, as a boarder at Melbourne Church of England Girls' Grammar School from 1928 to 1937. From an early age she stood out as an independent thinker and was known for her lack of respect for authority. She recalled of her family life "that I wasn't to do something just because it 'wasn't the proper thing for a girl'. I was free to do anything my elder brother did, provided I'd reached the requisite size and muscle power". Another recollection was that she developed her life-long love of poetry while at school, especially during detention when she was required to memorize poetry as well as prose passages.

== Professional life ==
At the University of Melbourne Dyason majored in physiology and bacteriology, gaining a B.Sc (Hons) in 1943 and M.Sc. in 1945 with first class honours and an exhibition. She was a resident of University Women's College from the beginning of her studies in 1938, and later became a committed member of the council (1945-1952) and eventually was appointed the governor (1961). She was first employed in 1943 as a demonstrator in the Physiology Department of the University of Melbourne while she carried out her M.Sc research. Her research on malaria led her to work with Professor (Sir) Douglas Wright, firstly as a research assistant and then in 1947 as a senior demonstrator in the Department of General Science. In 1949 she was employed as lecturer in the new Department of History and Methods of Science that was created under Wright's leadership. Dyason was assigned to teach first year medical students in a compulsory but non-examinable course, a difficult task that she nevertheless turned into a memorable experience for them.

Her enthusiasm for the new academic field of History and Philosophy of Science led her in 1952-1953 to travel overseas where she attended lectures and seminars in the United States and Britain, including some given by James Bryant Conant at Harvard University and Sir Karl Popper at University College and the LSE in London. In 1957, when Dyason was now a senior lecturer, the department had another name change to History and Philosophy of Science. Dyason was put in charge in 1958 and was appointed Reader and Head of Department from 1965 to 1974. In 1961 she attended the famous Oxford presentation by T S Kuhn where he first presented his controversial ideas about historical changes in scientific theories and the importance of social factors. Her own research became increasingly interested in the social history of medicine, and in the 1970s she was a key figure in the introduction of courses in Science, Technology and Society at Melbourne University. Under her leadership the department grew and consolidated its position, and she continued to inspire with her wit and innovative, dedicated teaching An outstanding example was in the 1970s, when Dyason collaborated with the folk musician Danny Spooner to develop a highly popular course, titled "Glorious Smellbourne", on the topic of public health and the sewerage systems in Melbourne that included two volumes of resource materials she had compiled.

As the new academic field of History and Philosophy of Science began to establish itself, Dyason played a leadership role in Australia and, later, internationally. In 1967 she became the founding president of the Australasian Association of the History and Philosophy of Science (later to become known as the Australasian Association of the History and Philosophy of Science (AAHPSSS)). She was instrumental in making her new discipline more relevant professionally to scientists when she became a founding member of the National Committee for History and Philosophy of Science in the Australian Academy of Science. Internationally, she became active as a delegate to general assemblies of the International Union of the History and Philosophy of Science in Tokyo (1974) and Edinburgh (1977). According to her successor, Professor R. W. Home, she helped bridge the gap in knowledge of those who wrote about the history of science or medicine, whether scientists, without an understanding of historical methods, or historians, without an understanding of the science they were describing. The AAHPSSS has established the Dyason Lectures at each year's conference in honour of her memory.

Towards the end of her career she was still publishing in the area of history of medicine as well as reflecting on her professional life and was a member of the Council of the Royal Children's Hospital School (1983 to 1988). When she retired, The Second National Congress on Australian Medical History dedicated a whole day of presentations, as well as the published proceedings, to her. At the Congress she was elected to a committee to establish what became a national medical history society (now the Australian and New Zealand Society of the History of Medicine) and later became its foundation Vice-President.

After retirement in 1985, she was appointed a research associate at the University of Melbourne, was awarded an honorary D.Litt. by Deakin University in 1985, and continued to enjoy her other interests in poetry, watercolour painting and bush-walking.

== Death and legacy ==
Dyason died at Heidelberg on 30 September 1989 and was buried in Andersons Creek cemetery in Victoria. The Department of History and Philosophy of Science library at the University of Melbourne was named after her and contains a portrait of her by Wes Walters, a noted Victorian artist.
