= Athletics at the 2008 Summer Paralympics – Women's 200 metres T36 =

The Women's 200m T36 had its Final held on September 13 at 10:40.

== Medalists ==
Gold	Wang Fang; China
Silver	Claudia Nicoleitzik; Germany
Bronze	Hazel Simpson; Great Britain

== Results ==
Place	Athlete	Final
1	Wang Fang (CHN)	29.57
2	Claudia Nicoleitzik (GER)	31.48
3	Hazel Simpson (GBR)	32.43
4	Jeon Min-Jae (KOR)	32.62
5	Yuki Kato (JPN)	33.53
6	Chun Lai Yu (HKG)	33.55
7	Agyul Sakhibzadaeva (RUS)	33.91
