= John Norton (journalist) =

Australian journalist and politician

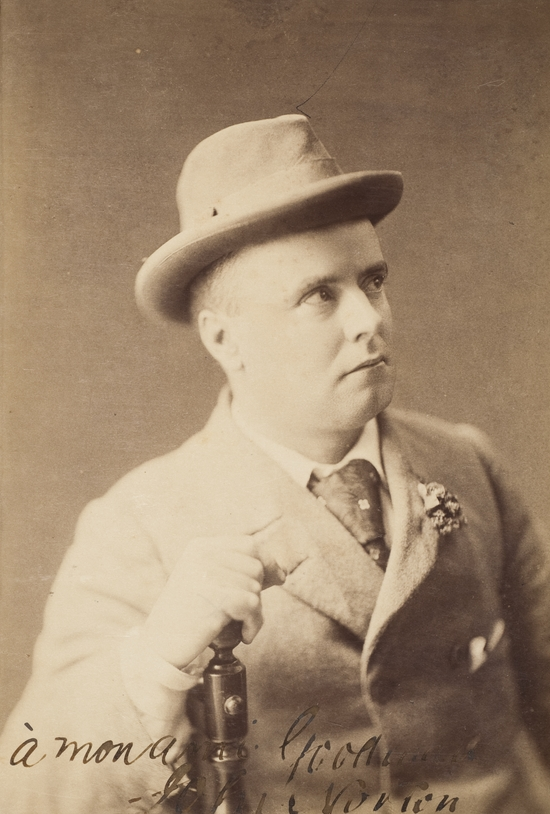
- Norton in 1898

Member of the New South Wales Parliament for Darling Harbour
- In office 10 September 1907 – 18 February 1910
- Preceded by: William Daley
- Succeeded by: John Cochran

Member of the New South Wales Parliament for Surry Hills
- In office 6 August 1904 – 5 July 1906
- Preceded by: New electorate
- Succeeded by: Albert Bruntnell

Member of the New South Wales Parliament for Northumberland
- In office 20 June 1899 – 16 July 1904
- Preceded by: Richard Stevenson
- Succeeded by: Matthew Charlton

Member of the New South Wales Parliament for Sydney-Fitzroy
- In office 3 June 1898 – 8 July 1898
- Preceded by: John McElhone
- Succeeded by: Henry Chapman

Personal details
- Born: John Norton Jnr. 25 January 1858 Brighton, England, United Kingdom
- Died: 9 April 1916 (aged 59) East Melbourne, Victoria, Australia
- Resting place: South Head Cemetery
- Party: Independent
- Spouse: Ada McGrath (m. 29 April 1897)
- Relations: Ezra Norton, son
- Children: 1 daughter, 1 son
- Profession: Journalist

John Norton (25 January 1858 – 9 April 1916) was an English-born Australian journalist, editor and member of the New South Wales Parliament. He was a writer and newspaper proprietor best known for his Sydney newspaper Truth. Norton was arguably one of Australia's most controversial public figures ever.

== Life, career and controversy ==
John Norton was born on 25 January 1858. He claimed to have been born in Brighton, Sussex, England, but may have been born in London. He was the only son of John Norton, stonemason, who died before he was born. His mother, Mary Davis, in 1860 married Benjamin Timothy Herring, a silk-weaver, who allegedly mistreated his stepson. Norton apparently spent some time in Paris, where he learned to speak French. He claimed to have walked to Constantinople in 1880, where he became a journalist.

Norton emigrated to Australia in 1884 and soon became chief reporter on the Evening News, which supported free trade. In 1885 he edited the official report of the Third Intercolonial Trades Union Congress. One of its resolutions condemned the New South Wales Governments contribution of £250,000 to assist migration from Europe. Norton was selected by the Trades and Labor Council of New South Wales to go to Europe in 1886 to tell potential immigrants that Australia was not a workers' paradise. He attended a trade union congress in Hull and spoke in French to one in Paris.

On his return, Norton became editor of the Newcastle Morning Herald and Miners Advocate, but was sacked for drunkenness after a few months. Within a few weeks of its establishment in August 1890, he then joined Truth, which favoured exposé articles. He soon became its editor and in April 1891 he altered its masthead to claim proprietorship, but was sacked as editor for repeated drunkenness.

He became the owner of the Sydney newspaper, Truth in 1896 and it became even more abusive of public figures, leading to increased circulation and legal action including trials for criminal libel and sedition, which he generally managed to beat. Similar publications Brisbane Truth, Melbourne Truth and Perth Truth were established by 1903. Norton's staunchly nationalistic paper published many late-19th-century Australian authors such as Henry Lawson.

=== The Grohn affair ===
In 1906, Norton was accused in the press of attempted murder. He became embroiled in a murder investigation regarding the death of one George Grohn (de Groen), who died in mysterious circumstances in John Norton's house on 9 November 1902. The men were both drunk on the night Grohn died, and Norton gave evidence that Grohn died because he had accidentally fallen down the stairs, but the investigating police and others believed Norton had hit him on the head with a bottle, killing him instantly. Norton was alleged to have organised a Randwick physician named Dr. Osborne H. Reddall to issue a death certificate stating Grohn had died of "natural causes". It was also alleged that the death certificate was written out while Dr. Reddall was in Truth's Sydney office, before the physician had even viewed the body. Norton held on to Grohn's death certificate for two years until he finally registered the death in 1904. These details emerged in 1906, and the police immediately requested that Grohn's death be investigated by the City Coroner. Grohn's body was exhumed from its grave at Rookwood Cemetery for an autopsy. The 1906 inquest into Grohn's death produced an open finding due to lack of medical evidence, but serious doubts over the incident always remained.

=== Wowser ===
John Norton is recognised as coining the Australian word 'wowser', for one whose overdeveloped sense of morality drives them to deprive others of their pleasures; a person regarded as excessively puritanical; a killjoy. He is mentioned as the inventor of this word in the Macquarie Dictionary.

"I invented the word myself," he wrote. "I was the first man publicly to use the word. I first gave it public utterance in the City Council, when I applied it to Alderman G. J. Waterhouse, whom I referred to as the white, woolly, weary, watery, word-wasting wowser from Waverley". (Note: Gustavus John Waterhouse (1850–1929) was a Waverley alderman 1891–1899 and mayor in 1897 and 1898. He was a Sydney alderman 1899–1900.) An early instance of the word as a term of approbation is found in Norton's Truth of 8 April 1900.

== Parliamentary career ==
Norton served for nearly 12 years in the N.S.W. Legislative Assembly and made many enemies among other politicians. Conversely, he was very popular with his constituents. He was initially elected to parliament as the member for Sydney-Fitzroy at a by-election in June 1898 and served until the July 1898 elections. He subsequently became the member for three other Sydney electorates. Redmer Yska, in his book Truth: The Rise and Fall of the People's Paper, states on page 16 that Norton, in a drunken stupor, once urinated on the floor of the chamber in view of members.

=== The Norton-Meagher fracas ===
Norton featured in one of the most "sensational" incidents Sydney had ever witnessed back on 21 September 1898. Norton's bitter rival and fellow politician, Richard Meagher (1866–1931), member for Tweed, horsewhipped Norton in Sydney's busy Pitt Street in front of hundreds of bystanders following Norton's labelling him "Mr. Mendax Meagher" in his Truth newspaper. Norton also described Meagher as the "premier perjurer of our public life and the champion criminal of the continent". After he had been whipped, Norton responded by firing three shots at Meagher with a revolver. Both men were charged with assault at Central Police Court; Meagher was fined £5 and Norton was found not guilty.

Norton represented Northumberland, from 1899 to 1901; Surry Hills, from 1904 to 1906; and Darling Harbour from 1907 to 1910. He was also elected three times as a Sydney alderman between 1898 and 1906. He ran unsuccessfully for the Senate in 1901 and 1906.

== Marriage, separation and death ==
Norton married Ada McGrath (1871–1960) on 29 April 1897 at St James' Church, Sydney. They had a son, Ezra Norton (1897–1967). Ten years later they had a daughter, Joan Norton (1907–1940). Initially, the family lived at Watsons Bay but by 1905 they had moved to a mansion, St Helena, overlooking Maroubra Beach.

Their marriage was not a happy one. John and Ada Norton were judicially separated on 9 November 1915 on the grounds of Norton's drunkenness, cruelty and adultery. John Norton represented himself during the proceedings while Richard Windeyer KC acted on behalf of Mrs Norton. Details of the divorce trial appeared in the national press, including Norton's own newspaper Truth.

John Norton was a chronic alcoholic and suffered from megalomania for most of his adult life.

John Norton died at a private hospital in Melbourne of uremia, a symptom of kidney failure, on 9 April 1916. He had been seriously ill for some months and had been in a coma for a week before his death. His wife, son and daughter were at his bedside when he died.

His body was returned to Sydney for burial. On 15 April 1916, huge crowds attended his funeral service at St James' Church and later at his elaborate burial at South Head Cemetery.

== Family challenge of Norton's estate ==
In his will John Norton disinherited his wife Ada and son Ezra and left the bulk of his estate to his 9-year-old daughter, Joan. The estate seemed to many to be greatly undervalued, even though it was presented for probate at £106,000 (equivalent to $12,000,000 in 2022).

Mrs Ada Norton persuaded the New South Wales Parliament to backdate the new Testator's Family Maintenance Act to take effect before Norton's death. Under this legislation, she succeeded in having his will rewritten in 1920 so that she and Ezra Norton each received a third of his inheritance, allowing Ezra Norton to gain control of the Truth media group. By 1927, John Norton's estate had been re-valued at £600,000 (equivalent to $55,000,000 in 2022).

Later, his daughter Joan Norton, as Mrs Ben Shashoua, was the petitioner behind the bankruptcy of Sydney businessman Hugh D. McIntosh. She married Ben Shashoua (Note: Benjamin Jacob Shashoua (born in Bagdad c. 1919), well known in theatrical circles, had been married previously, to one Alice Glaskie.) in London on 9 January 1930, although they separated after 6 months and she returned to Sydney. Joan Shashoua (née Norton) died in Sydney on 7 March 1940, like her father, from effects of alcoholism, and was buried in the Norton family plot at South Head Cemetery. She left an estate valued at £71,146.00 to her mother Ada and her brother Ezra Norton.

== Ada Norton ==
Ada Norton remarried in Paddington, London, in early 1920 to Reginald George Culhane, and was subsequently known as Mrs Ada Norton-Culhane. She died aged 88 at Vaucluse, New South Wales on 21 June 1960 and is buried at the Norton family plot at South Head Cemetery. Her husband, Reginald Culhane, died on 24 May 1975 at Darlinghurst.

== Sources ==
- Pearl, Cyril (1958). Wild Men of Sydney. London: W.H. Allen. ISBN 0207135398.
- Hall, Sandra (2008). Tabloid Man – The life and times of Ezra Norton. Fourth Estate Press. ISBN 9780732282592.

New South Wales Legislative Assembly
Preceded by John McElhone	Member for Sydney-Fitzroy; 1898	Succeeded by Henry Chapman
Preceded by Richard Stevenson	Member for Northumberland; 1899–1904	Succeeded by Matthew Charlton
Preceded by New seat	Member for Surry Hills; 1904–1906	Succeeded by Albert Bruntnell
Preceded by William Daley	Member for Darling Harbour; 1907–1910	Succeeded by John Cochran
