= Debbie Brennan =

British Paralympic athlete

Medal record

Track and field (athletics)

Representing United Kingdom

Paralympic Games
Gold medal – first place	2000 Sydney	200 metres - T34
Silver medal – second place	2004 Athens	200 metres - T34
Bronze medal – third place	2004 Athens	100 metres - T34
Bronze medal – third place	2000 Sydney	100 metres - T34

Debbie Brennan is a Paralympian athlete from Great Britain competing mainly in category T34 sprint events.

At the 2000 Sydney Paralympics, Brennan won gold in the women's 200m T34 and bronze in the women's 100m T34.

Brennan competed in the 100m and 200m in the T34 class at the 2004 Summer Paralympics in Athens and won a silver and bronze medal respectively.

Brennan is from Telford in Shropshire where she grew up and could often be seen out with her dad training in her wheelchair as he delivered and collected the football pools.
