= The Leader (Angaston) =

Australian newspaper

The Leader is a weekly newspaper that was first published in Angaston, South Australia on 24 July 1918, and continues being published to the present day in the Barossa Valley. It was the second English-language newspaper covering any part of the Barossa Valley, after the Barossa News and apart from the Kapunda Herald.

== History ==
The Leader was founded and for many years edited and printed by William Kirkby Robinson (1894–1976). Offices were from 1935 or earlier, to December 1938 or later, printing and publishing in Dean Street, Angaston.

From 1933, Robinson was secretary of the Angaston branch of the Agricultural Bureau, and was the founder of the Lower North pruning competition held yearly. He was responsible for the formation of the Barossa Fire Fighting Association in 1926 and has been fire control officer since then, and was for many years chief officer of the Angaston Fire Brigade. He was an unsuccessful candidate for the seat of Barossa at the 1944 House of Assembly by-election. From 1937 he also published The Sport, an Adelaide weekly. He was for some time chairman of directors of the Provincial Press Co-operative Company Ltd. (an advertising agency linked to the Provincial Press Association of South Australia). He was married to Agnes Elizabeth Robinson née Knapp; they had one child, (Kirkby) Rae Robinson (1918–1990), who married Molly Mansfield (1918–2003) on 24 January 1942.

In 1964, The Leader absorbed the Murray Plains Recorder (13 January 1961 - 24 September 1964), formerly the Mannum and District Recorder (2 June 1955 – 16 June 1960), which had been published in Mannum.

== Distribution ==
Its geographical coverage includes Angaston, Nuriootpa, Tanunda, Mount Pleasant, Kapunda and Gawler.

== Digitisation ==
The National Library of Australia has digitised photographic copies of most issues of The Leader from Vol 1, No.1 of 24 July 1918 to Vol. 36 No. 1,961 of 16 December 1954 that may be accessed via Trove.
