= The Sport (Adelaide newspaper) =

The Sport was a newspaper published in Adelaide between April 1911 and October 1948, which apart from articles on racing, football, cricket, and boxing, carried items of general interest, satire and political comment.

== History ==
The Sport, founded in 1909, advertised itself as the only independently owned sporting newspaper in South Australia. From 1911 (or earlier) it was printed and published by Frederick Joseph Jennings (c. 1882 – 18 November 1948) at Jennings Printing Works, 72 Flinders Street, Adelaide, for the proprietors. Jennings was owner of several noted racehorses: Cadelgo, one of those involved in a triple dead heat at Cheltenham in 1927, and Argosy Boy that ran a dead heat with Anotto in 1919, and paid £301/17/ on the playoff. John Clarence "Clarrie" Neate (1904–1972) served as his trainer and also as caricaturist for the newspaper.

In June 1915 it republished a number of articles from the recently revived Adelaide Truth. A sister publication, the Northern Sportsman (6 March 1924 – 8 October 1931) was published as a special regional edition of the newspaper. It advertised itself as a "Sporting paper covering northern country and urban areas of the state including such places as Port Augusta, Clare, Kadina, as well as the suburbs of Adelaide such as Golden Grove, Plympton, and southern centres such as Strathalbyn." In 1931, it was subsumed by the main publication.

From 1937 it was printed and published by William Kirkby Robinson, offices 16 Kensington Road, Rose Park. Robinson (1894–1976) founded the Angaston Leader, first issue 24 July 1918. He was married to Agnes. In 1946 the newspaper was taken over by Shipping Newspapers (S.A.) Ltd and ceased publication shortly before Jenning's death in late 1948.

== Digitization ==
The National Library of Australia has digitized photographic copies of most issues of The Sport as part of the Australian Newspapers Digitisation Project.
