= Padraic McGuinness =

Australian journalist

- Born: 27 October 1938; Melbourne, Victoria, Australia
- Died: 26 January 2008 (aged 69); Sydney, New South Wales, Australia
- Other names: Paddy McGuinness, P. P. McGuinness
- Occupations: Journalist; newspaper editor
- Known for: Views as a political commentator

Padraic Pearse "Paddy" McGuinness AO (27 October 1938 – 26 January 2008) was an Australian journalist, activist, and commentator. He began his career on the far left, then worked as a policy assistant to the more moderate Labor parliamentarian Bill Hayden. Later he found fame as a right-wing contrarian and finished his career as the editor of the conservative journal, Quadrant. He had also worked as a columnist for The Australian and The Sydney Morning Herald and as the editor of The Australian Financial Review.

== Early life ==
McGuinness, named after Irish nationalist Patrick Pearse, was the youngest child of Frank McGuinness (1900–1949), who was the inaugural editor of Ezra Norton's Sydney newspaper The Daily Mirror in 1941. Padraic attended, first, Saint Ignatius' College, Riverview (from his time there he dated the atheist attitudes which remained constant in his adult life, whatever his changes of ideological allegiance) and then obtained a scholarship to attend Sydney Boys High School. He studied economics at the University of Sydney (B.Ec., Hons, 1960), where he became a prominent member of the Sydney Push in the late 1950s and early 1960s. At that time, he identified as an anarchist but also joined the Labor Party.

== Career ==
After a short career as an economics lecturer at the NSW University of Technology (now the University of New South Wales), McGuinness moved to London where he worked with the Moscow Narodny Bank, an arm of the Soviet Government, from 1966 to 1967. Continuing his studies at the London School of Economics, he acquired a master's degree. He later worked for the OECD in Paris, and there he observed the Paris demonstrations of 1968. Having returned to Sydney in 1971, he began what would be a long tenure at The Australian Financial Review, by writing economics articles.

=== Government adviser ===
In 1973–74, he served the Whitlam Labor government as an economic advisor to the Minister for Social Security, Bill Hayden, who was engaged in establishing Medibank and reforming policy for private hospitals and nursing homes. During this time McGuinness advocated the introduction of Medibank, against the opinions of doctors who mostly wanted health care to remain private.

=== Journalist ===
After working for Hayden, McGuinness's career was chiefly in journalism, including senior editorial positions at The Australian Financial Review (1974–87), where he became editor-in-chief in 1982. He also wrote occasional film reviews and columns for The Sydney Morning Herald, The Age and The Australian. In 1997 he was appointed editor of Quadrant, a position he held for ten years.

=== Political candidate ===
McGuinness reportedly became a member of the Australian Labor Party and unsuccessfully sought preselection for the seat of Sydney (which he later persistently denied). In 2002–2004, he served as an independent councillor on Leichhardt Council.

== Death and legacy ==
McGuinness died from cancer on Australia Day, 26 January 2008, aged 69, having recently stood down as editor of Quadrant. He was survived by his daughter Parnell Palme McGuinness, named after Charles Stewart Parnell, and two siblings: his older brother Michael and his older sister Judy. Parnell McGuinness is a columnist with the Sydney Morning Herald. His wife, Brigitte, predeceased him in 1999.

According to journalist colleague Frank Devine, "Paddy was the quintessential independent thinker, scorning humbug and stupidity. He was a bloodthirsty predator among those he identified as members of the chattering classes". However, he was himself frequently criticised for pomposity and hypocrisy when, for instance, he accepted an Order of Australia AO award in 2003 despite a long-held, vocal contempt for such honours.

The day before his funeral, former prime minister Paul Keating, denigrated him as "a fraud and a liar". Keating had previously paid public tribute to McGuinness for contributing to his economic education but, after McGuinness became a frequent critic of Keating's government and persona, Keating described him as "a bloated cane toad", and predicted that "the quality of the Australian press will rise simply because his vituperation and contumely will have been excised from it."

== Bibliography ==
=== Books ===
- McGuinness, P. P. In Search of the Magic Pudding (Note: Keynote address to H R Nicholls Society Conference, August 1988.)

=== Articles ===
- McGuinness, P. P. (July–August 2003). "An interview with Vaclav Klaus, President of the Czech Republic". Quadrant. 47 (7–8 [398]): 22–25.
- McGuinness, P. P. (June 2004). "Oh, for an intelligent social engineer". Sydney Morning Herald. (Note: Reprinted in commemoration on 28 January 2008.)

———————
