= J. C. Wharton =

Joseph John Cheyne Wharton BA (c. 1859 – 19 November 1923), generally known as J. C. Wharton, J. Cheyne Wharton or Joseph Cheyne Wharton, was a journalist in South Australia and New South Wales.

== History ==
He was born in Dublin the eldest son of James Henry Wharton and educated at Wesley College and Trinity College, Dublin, where he received double first honours in Classics and English Literature.

He emigrated to South Australia around 1880 and was employed as Classics master at St. Peter's College, and was for several years on the editorial staff of the South Australian Register.

He was editor of the Adelaide University Shakespeare Society's Journal 1886–1887.

In 1887 he served as secretary to Sir Herbert B. Sandford, the Commissioner for the British Section at the Adelaide Jubilee International Exhibition.

He was editor of the (Anglican) Church Review and in 1890 founder and editor of a short-lived newspaper titled Truth published in Adelaide and printed by Hussey and Gillingham, then in 1891 secretary to the Stock Exchange of Adelaide.

He moved to New South Wales, and was employed by the Sydney Morning Herald.

He was for a time editor of the Parramatta Times, and edited The Jubilee History of Parramatta 1861-1911

== Family ==
He married Anna Frederika De Reyher ( – 2 June 1948) on 9 July 1885; their children included:

- Dorothea Wharton (1888– )
- Laetitia Wharton (1890– )
- Philip Wharton ( – 31 January 1930)
