= Athletics at the 2008 Summer Paralympics – Women's 100 metres T36 =

The Women's 100m T36 had its Final held on September 16 at 18:03.

== Medalists ==
Gold	Wang Fang; China
Silver	Claudia Nicoleitzik; Germany
Bronze	Hazel Simpson; Great Britain

== Results ==
Place	Athlete	Final
1	Wang Fang (CHN)	13.82 WR
2	Claudia Nicoleitzik (GER)	15.00
3	Hazel Simpson (GBR)	15.40
4	Yuki Kato (JPN)	15.42
5	Chun Lai Yu (HKG)	15.66
6	Jeon Min-Jae (KOR)	15.67
7	Aygyul Sakhibzadaeva (RUS)	15.74
8	Yulia Linevich (RUS)	16.10
