= Oksana Krechunyak =

Ukrainian Paralympic athlete (born 1981)

Medal record

Paralympic athletics

Representing Ukraine

Paralympic Games
Gold medal – first place	2004 Athens	100 metres - T37

Oksana Krechunyak (Ukrainian: Оксана Кречуняк; born 25 April 1981) is a Paralympian athlete from Ukraine competing mainly in category T37 sprint events.

Oksana has twice competed in the Paralympics, in 2004 and 2008, on both occasions competing in the 100m and 200m. She won the 100m gold medal in 2004.
