= Sandringham Primary School =

- Sandringham, Victoria; Australia

Information
- Other name: Sandy Primary
- Type: Primary School
- Motto: Respect. Resilience. Relationships. Responsibility. Resourcefulness.
- Established: 1855
- Principal: Louise Neave
- Gender: Mixed
- Age range: 5–12
- Language: English
- Colors: Blue & Gold
- Website: www.sandyps.vic.edu.au

Sandringham Primary School is a primary school in Sandringham, Victoria. It is one of the oldest schools in the state of Victoria, with it being established in 1855.

== History ==
Sandringham Primary School was founded in 1855, under the name of the "Gipsy Village Church of England School. By 1858, 36 students were enrolled at the school. However, attendance was sporadic, and by 1879 principal Thomas S. Dickson stated that the average school attendance on any given day was less than 20 students. By 1881, the school which consisted of only one building, was deteriorating, and a report found it "not totally suitable for school purposes". Over the next few years, the school attempted to find a new location, which it succeeded in doing in 1885.

=== 2020 Fire ===
In January 2020, the school was partially burnt down by six teenagers. The fire caused students to be temporarily moved to Sandringham College and Sandringham East Primary School while rebuilding was under way. Peter Elliot Architecture was contracted to rebuild the school.

=== May 2020 dairy ban ===
In May 2020 Sandringham Primary banned dairy products from school grounds, due to a student with a severe allergy to dairy. This decision was criticised by non-profit organisation Allergy & Anaphylaxis Australia as an overreaction.
