= Katrina Webb =

Australian Paralympic athlete

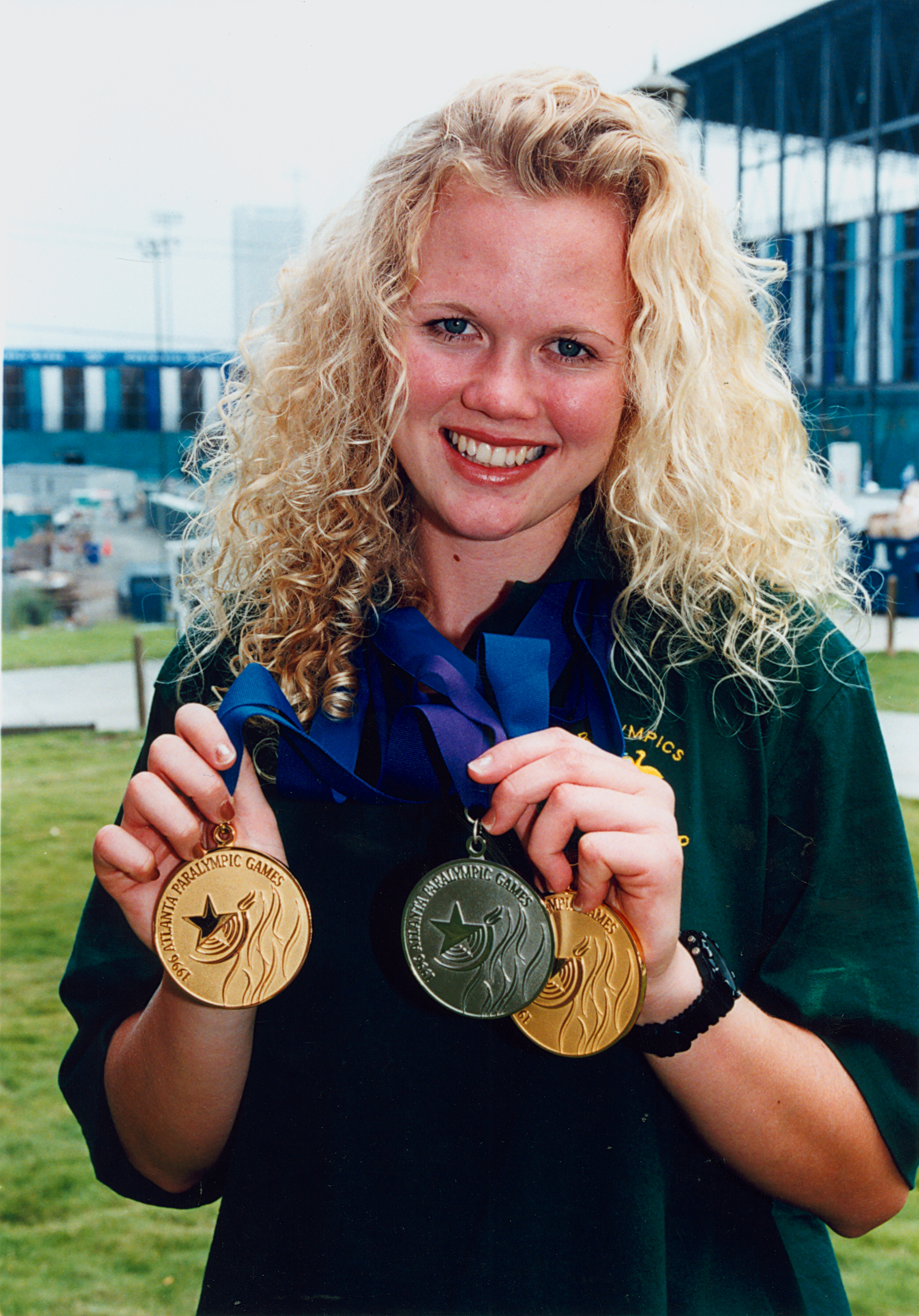
- Katrina Webb in 1996

Personal information
- Full name: Katrina Lea Webb
- Nationality: Australia
- Born: 22 May 1977 (age 49)
Medal record
Athletics
Paralympic Games
Gold medal – first place	1996 Atlanta	100 m T36-37
Gold medal – first place	1996 Atlanta	200 m T34-37
Gold medal – first place	2004 Athens	Women's 400 m T38
Silver medal – second place	1996 Atlanta	Long Jump F34-37
Silver medal – second place	2000 Sydney	100 m T38
Silver medal – second place	2000 Sydney	400 m T38
Bronze medal – third place	2000 Sydney	200 m T38
IPC Athletics World Championships
Gold medal – first place	1998 Birmingham	Women's Javelin
Silver medal – second place	1998 Birmingham	Women's 100m
Silver medal – second place	1998 Birmingham	Women's 400m
Silver medal – second place	2002 Lille	Women's 100m
Silver medal – second place	2002 Lille	Women's 400m
Commonwealth Games
Silver medal – second place	2006 Melbourne	100m

Katrina Lea Webb-Denis, OAM (born 22 May 1977) is an Australian Paralympic athlete with cerebral palsy. She has won gold, silver and bronze medals in athletics at three Paralympic Games.

== Personal ==
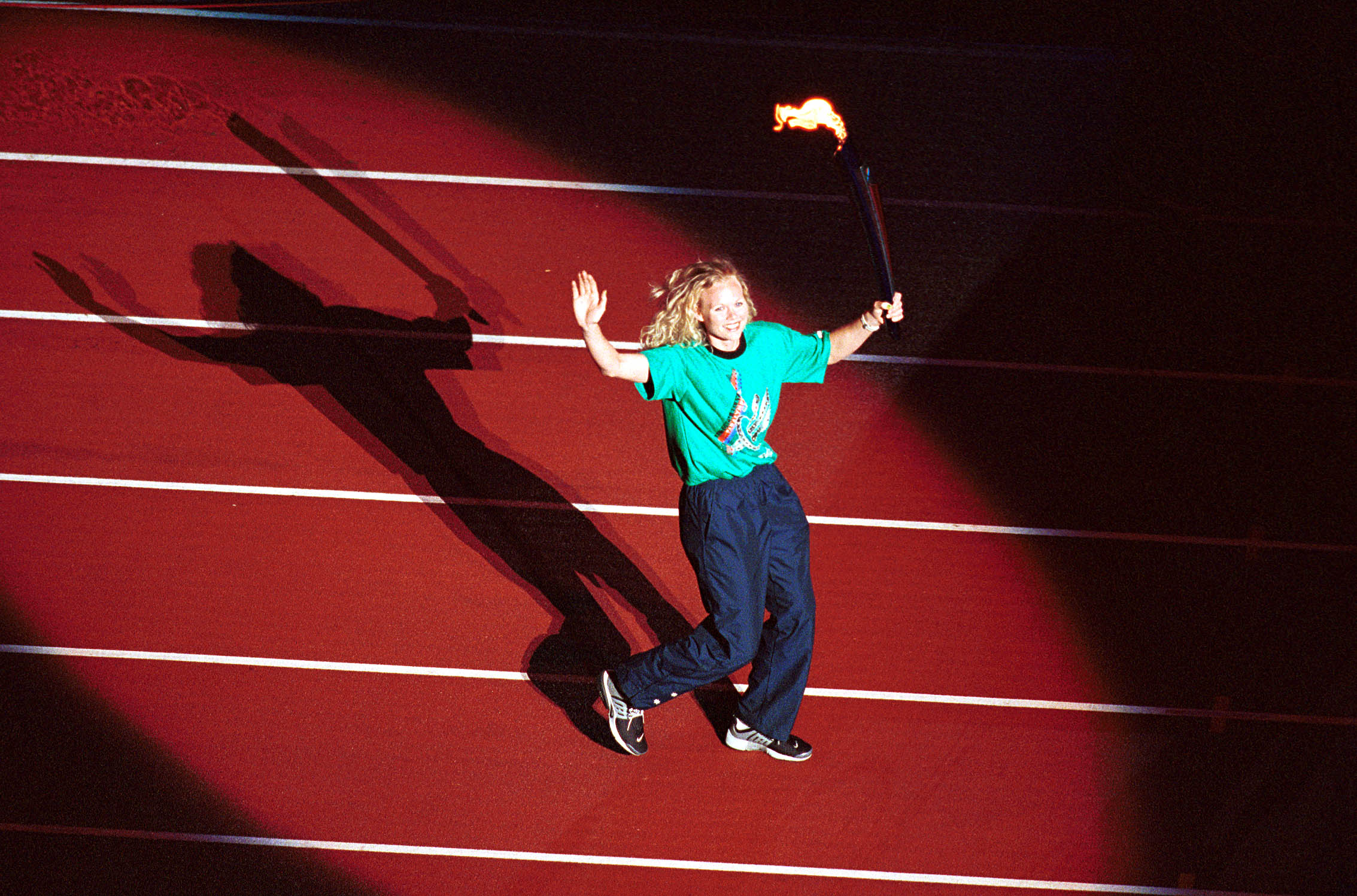
Webb waves to the crowd as she runs during the torch relay at the Opening Ceremony of the 2000 Summer Paralympics

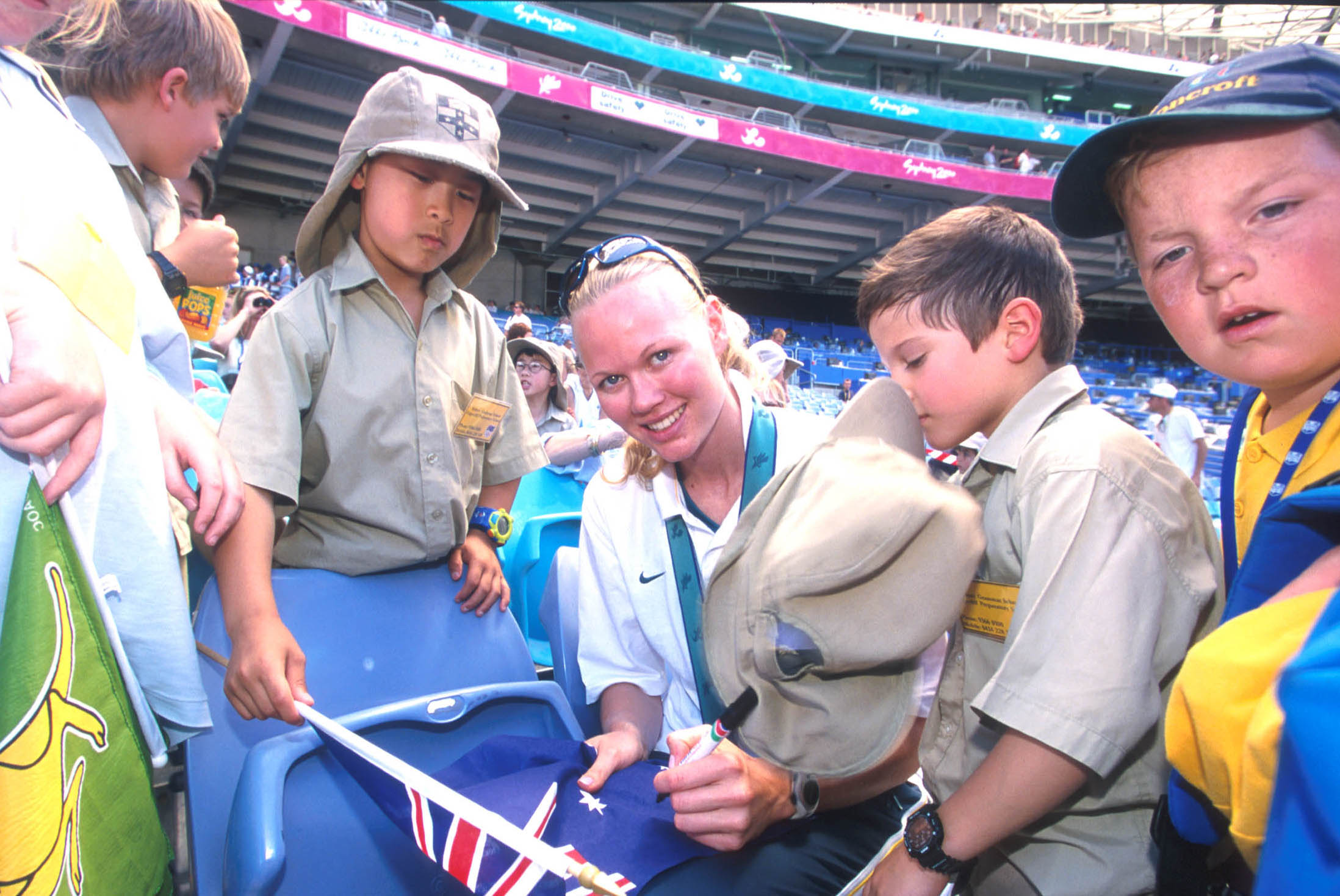
Webb autographs an Australian flag for school children fans at the 2000 Summer Paralympics

Webb has a mild form of cerebral palsy which was diagnosed when she was two years old. Her parents did not tell her of the disability. Her cerebral palsy was diagnosed again when she won an Australian Institute of Sport netball scholarship. AIS staff found a weakness in her right leg, which was shorter than her left leg. She was then encouraged to become involved in disability sport. After winning the 100m at the 1996 Atlanta Games, she faced criticism over her legitimacy to compete at the Games.

She has a physiotherapy degree from the University of South Australia. Her father Darryl played league football for North Adelaide Football Club. Her cousins are Olympic basketballer Rachael Sporn and AFL players Kieran and Trent Sporn. She married former Australian Olympic water polo player Eddie Denis. Her first child Sebastian Zavier Denis was born on 27 December 2007.

She was the first torch bearer to enter the Olympic Stadium for the Opening Ceremony of the Sydney 2000 Paralympic Games. In 2006 Katrina was selected to present on behalf of the International Paralympic Committee to the United Nations in New York.

In November 2017, Webb was inducted into the South Australian Sports Hall of Fame. Webb was appointed Deputy Chef de Mission for the Australian Team at the 2026 Commonwealth Games.

== Athletic achievements ==
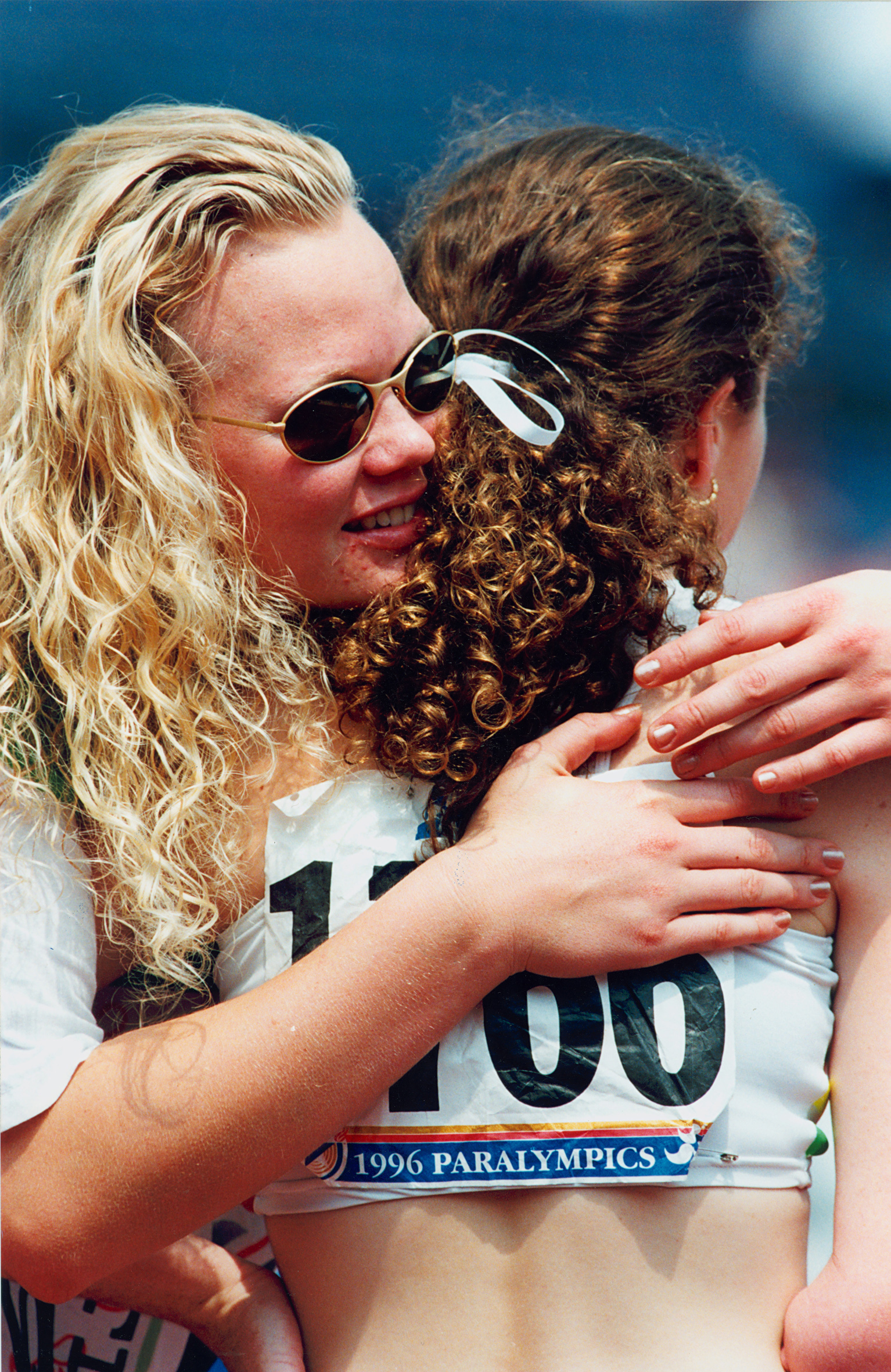
Australian athlete Katrina Webb congratulates fellow athlete Amy Winters at the 1996 Atlanta Paralympic Games

- 1994 all Australian Netball Squad 17 & under
- 1995 Australian Institute of Sport Netball Scholarship
- 1996 Atlanta Paralympic Games: Gold 100m, Gold 200m, Silver Long Jump
- 1997 Medal of the Order of Australia for her gold medals in Atlanta
- 1998 IPC Athletics World Championships: Silver 400m, Silver 100m & Gold Javelin & WR
- 1997–2000 South Australian Athlete Ambassador for Health & Disabilities
- 2000 Sydney Paralympic Games: Silver 400m, Silver 100m and Bronze 200m; Australian Sports Medal
- 2001 Centenary Medal
- 2002 World Athletic Championships: Silver 100m and Silver 400m
- 2004 New World record for the 200m T38 class
- 2004 Athens Paralympic Games: Gold 400m and Paralympic Record
- 2004 South Australian Sports Institute Female Athlete of the Year
- 2005 Australian Institute of Sport Athletics Scholarship Canberra
- 2006 Melbourne Commonwealth Games Silver 100m
