= Wang Fang (athlete) =

Chinese Paralympic athlete

Personal information
- Born: 26 January 1983 (age 43)

Sport
- Sport: Paralympic athletics
- Disability class: T36
Medal record
Track and field
Representing China
Paralympic Games
Gold medal – first place	2004 Athens	100m T36
Gold medal – first place	2004 Athens	200m T36
Gold medal – first place	2008 Beijing	100m T36
Gold medal – first place	2008 Beijing	200m T36
Silver medal – second place	2004 Athens	400m T38
Asian Para Games
Gold medal – first place	2010 Guangzhou	100m T36
Gold medal – first place	2010 Guangzhou	200m T36

Wang Fang (born 26 January 1983) is a Paralympian athlete from China competing mainly in category T36 sprint events.

She competed in the 2004 Summer Paralympics in Athens, Greece. There she won a gold medal in the women's 100 m T36, a gold medal in the women's 200 m T36 and a silver medal in the women's 400 m T38. She also competed at the 2008 Summer Paralympics in Beijing, China. There she won a gold medal in the women's 100 m T36 and a gold medal in the women's 200 m T36.
