= Eriko Kikuchi =

Japanese Paralympic athlete

Medal record

Paralympic athletics

Representing Japan

Paralympic Games
Bronze medal – third place	2004 Athens	200 metres - T36

Eriko Kikuchi (菊池 栄里子, Kikuchi Eriko) is a paralympic athlete from Japan competing mainly in category T36 sprint events.

Kikuchi competed in both the 100m and 200m in the 2004 Summer Paralympics picking up the bronze medal in the T26 200m.
