= Isabelle Foerder =

German Paralympic athlete (born 1979)

Personal information
- Nationality: Germany
- Born: 7 July 1979 (age 46)

Sport
- Sport: Paralympic athletics
- Disability: Cerebral palsy
- Disability class: T35
- Event: Sprints
Medal record
Representing Germany
Paralympic Games
Silver medal – second place	1996 Atlanta	200 metres – T34-37
Silver medal – second place	1996 Atlanta	100 metres – T36-37
Silver medal – second place	2000 Sydney	100 metres – T37
Silver medal – second place	2000 Sydney	100 metres – T37
Bronze medal – third place	2004 Athens	200 metres – T37
European Championships
Silver medal – second place	2012 Stadskanaal	4x100m- T35-38

Isabelle Foerder (born 7 July 1979) is a paralympic athlete from Germany, competing mainly in category T37 sprint events.

== Biography ==
Isabelle Foerder competed in four consecutive paralympics games, starting in 1996. These were the only games where she competed in long; every other time, including 1996, she competed in the 100m and 200m. She has had most success in the 100m, winning silver in 1996, 2000 and 2004, while she has also won a silver (1996) and bronze (2004) in the 200m.
