= Lisa McIntosh =

Australian Paralympic athlete

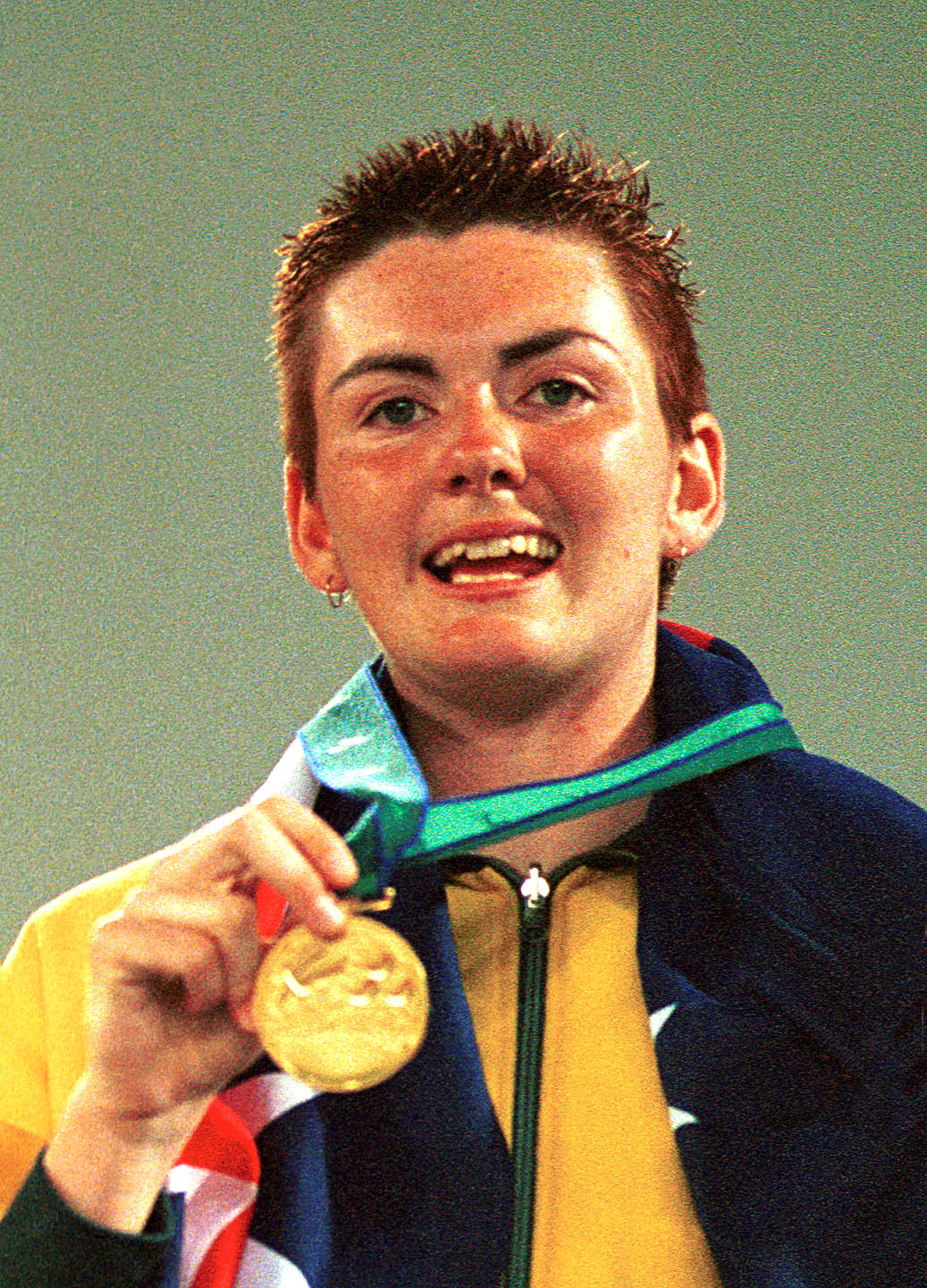
- McIntosh with her gold medal won in the 200 m T38 at the 2000 Summer Paralympics

Personal information
- Full name: Elizabeth McIntosh
- Nationality: Australia
- Born: 16 December 1982 (age 43) Sandringham, Victoria
Medal record
Women's para athletics
Representing Australia
Paralympic Games
Gold medal – first place	2000 Sydney	100 m T37
Gold medal – first place	2000 Sydney	200 m T38
Gold medal – first place	2000 Sydney	400 m T38
Gold medal – first place	2008 Beijing	100 m T37
Gold medal – first place	2008 Beijing	200 m T37
Silver medal – second place	2004 Athens	200 m T37
Bronze medal – third place	2004 Athens	100 m T37
World Championships
Gold medal – first place	1998 Birmingham	400 m T37
Gold medal – first place	2002 Lille	100 m T37
Gold medal – first place	2002 Lille	200 m T37
Gold medal – first place	2006 Assen	100 m T37
Gold medal – first place	2006 Assen	200 m T37
Silver medal – second place	1998 Birmingham	100 m T37
Bronze medal – third place	1998 Birmingham	200 m T38
Bronze medal – third place	2002 Lille	400 m T38
Commonwealth Games
Gold medal – first place	2006 Melbourne	100 m T37

Elizabeth "Lisa" McIntosh, OAM (born 16 December 1982) is an Australian Paralympian athlete with cerebral palsy, who competes mainly in sprint events.

== Personal ==
McIntosh was born in the Melbourne suburb of Sandringham on 16 December 1982. She has cerebral palsy which affects her left side. She works as a swimming instructor and lives in the Melbourne suburb of Beaconsfield.

== Career ==
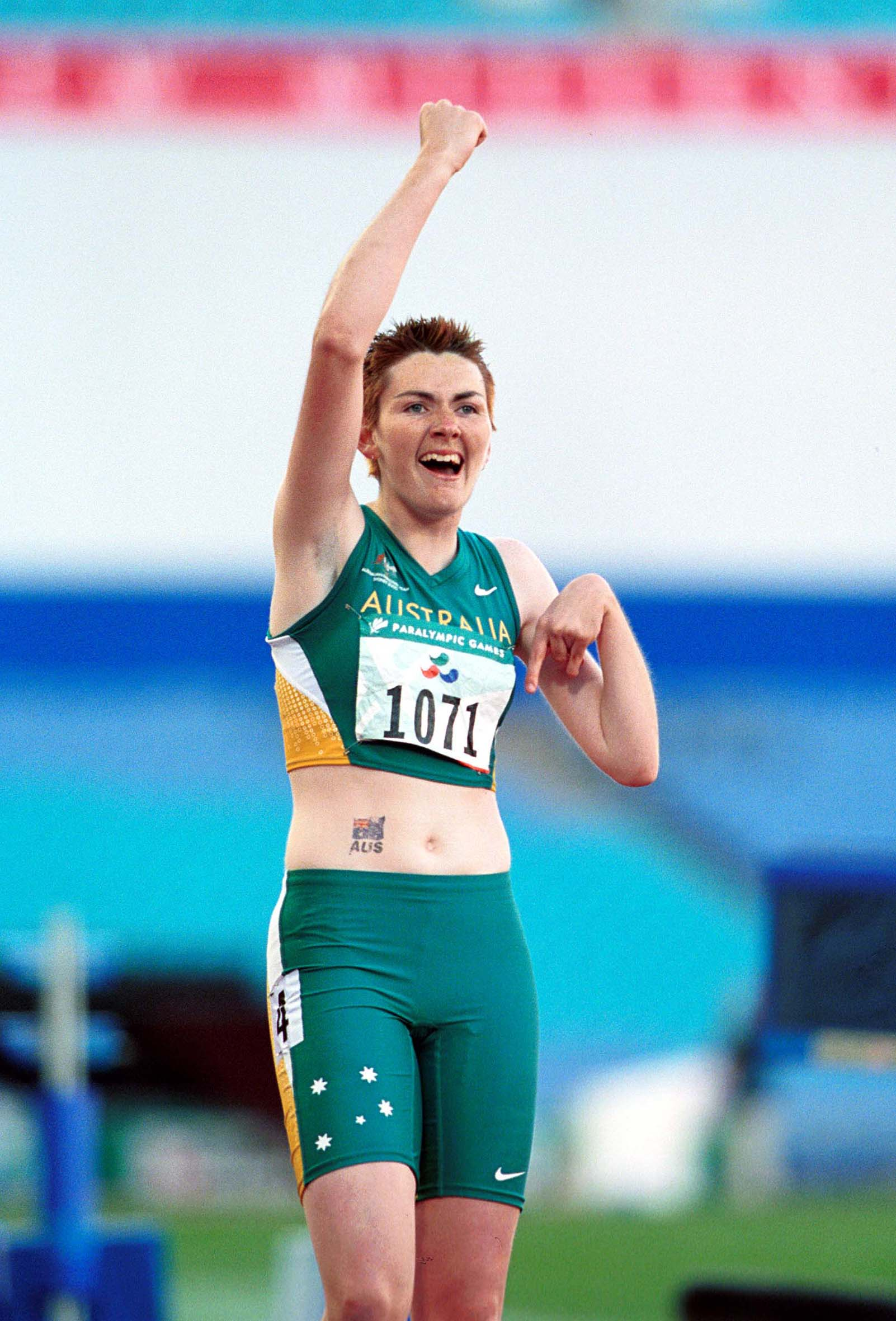
McIntosh celebrates winning gold in the 200 m T38 at the 2000 Summer Paralympics

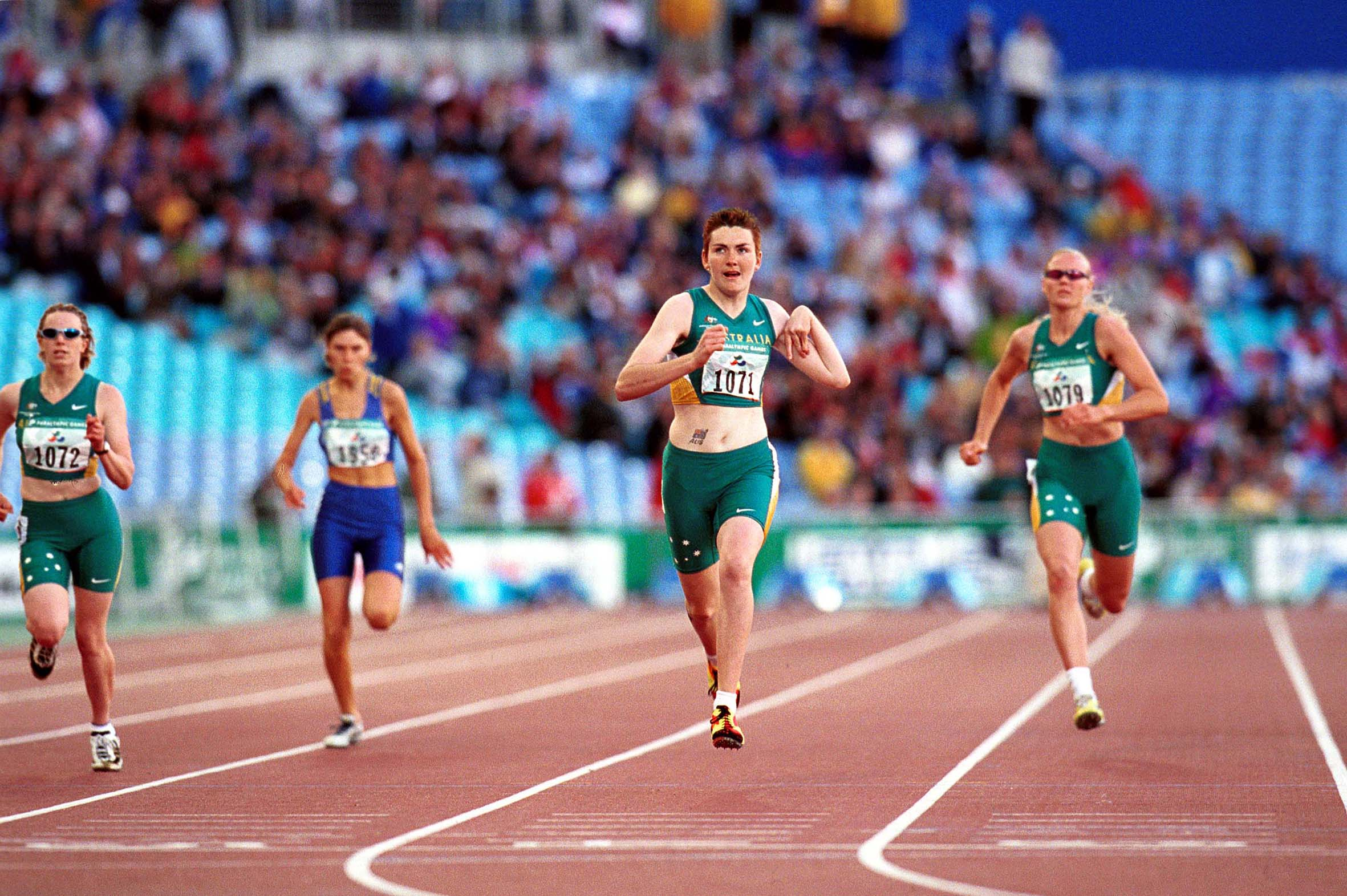
Action shot of McIntosh during her gold medal-winning sprint in the 200 m T38 event at the 2000 Summer Paralympics

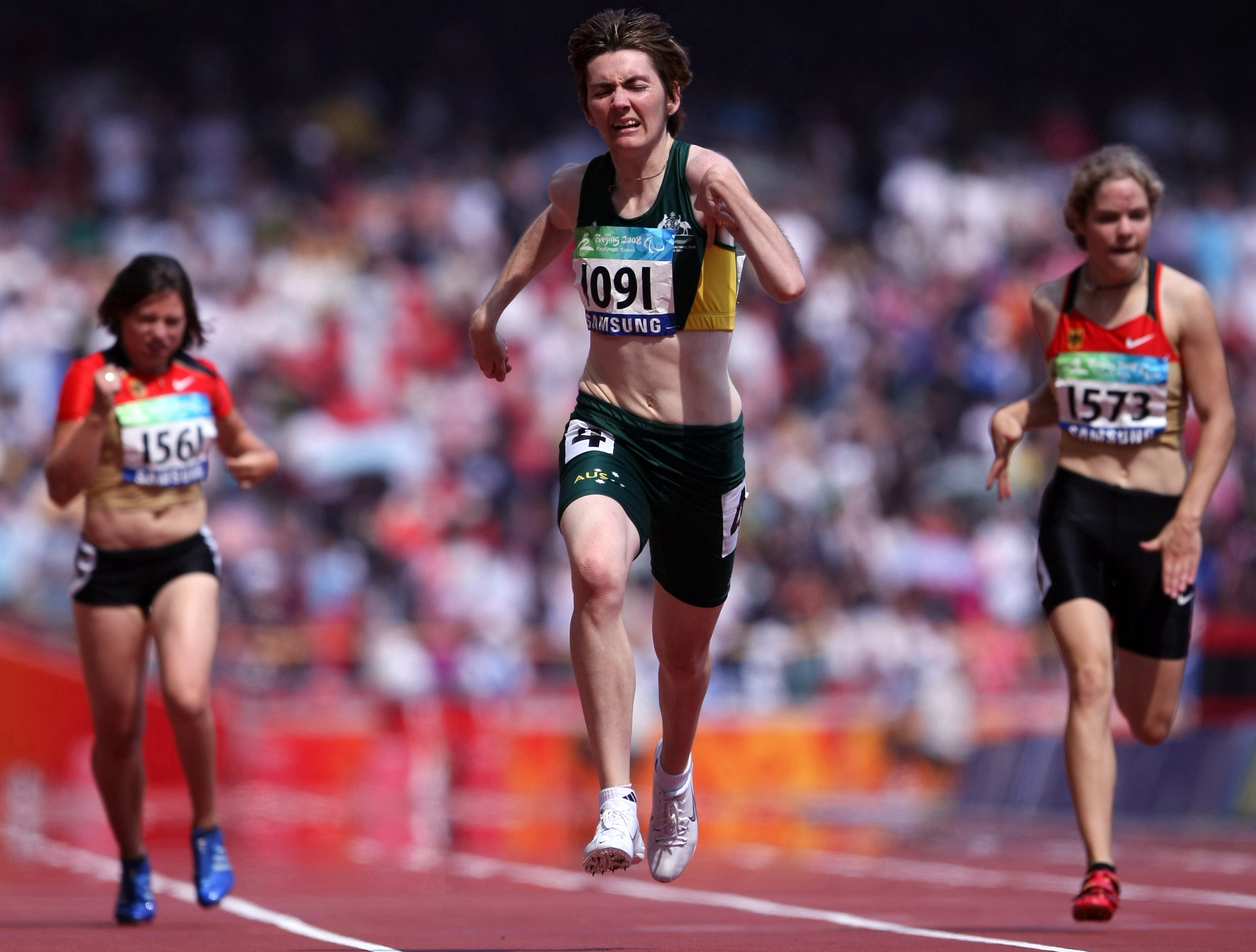
McIntosh winning the final of 100 m at the 2008 Summer Paralympics

McIntosh first competed for Australia in 1998. At the 2000 Sydney Games, she won three gold medals in the women's 100 m – T38, women's 200 m – T38 and women's 400 m – T38 events, for which she received a Medal of the Order of Australia. She was named the 2000 Junior Female Paralympian of the Year. At the 2004 Athens Games, she won a silver medal in the women's 200 m – T37 event and a bronze medal in the women's 100 m – T37 event, and finished fifth in the women's 400 m – T38 event. Despite recovering from a stress fracture in her left foot. At the 2008 Beijing Paralympics, she won two gold medals in the women's 100 m – T37 and women's 200 m – T37 events. She holds the world record for 100 m, 200 m and 400 m T37. She was named the 2008 Female Paralympian of the Year.

At the IPC Athletics World Championships, she won gold medals in women's 100 m and 200 m T37 events at both the 2002 Lille and 2006 Assen competitions. At the 2006 Melbourne Commonwealth Games, she won a gold medal in the Women's 100 m – T37 event. She was an Australian Institute of Sport athletics scholarship holder in 2003. She is taking a break to consider her future in athletics.
