= Sandringham, Victoria =

Sandringham
- Suburb
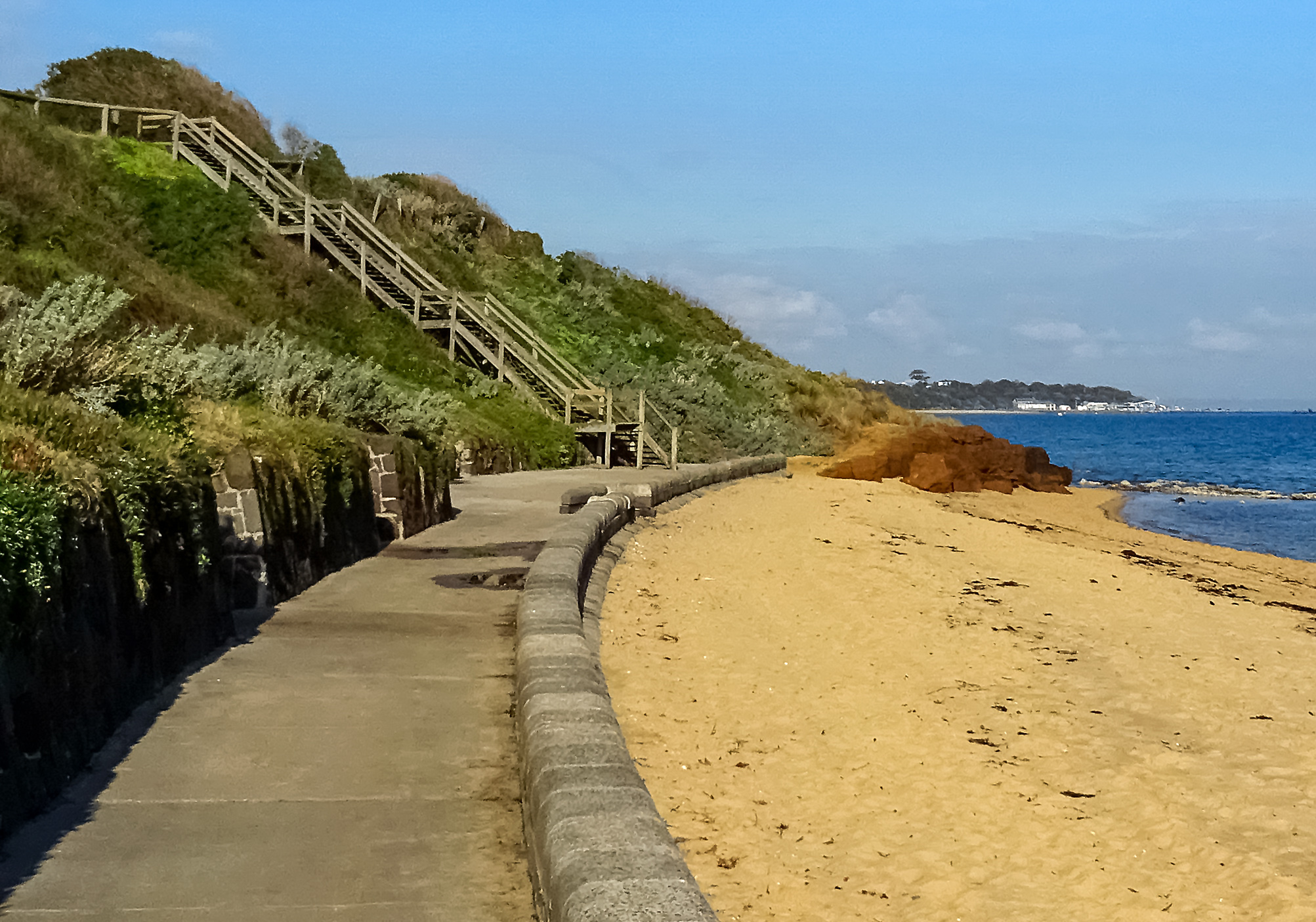
- Sandringham Beach

- Interactive map of Sandringham
- Coordinates: 37.9525°S 145.012311°E
- Country: Australia
- State: Victoria
- City: Melbourne
- LGA: City of Bayside
- Location: 16 km (9.9 mi) from Melbourne

Government
  - State electorate: Sandringham
  - Federal division: Goldstein

Area
  - Total: 3.5 km^{2} (1.4 sq mi)
- Elevation: 20 m (66 ft)

Population
  - Total: 10,926 (2021 census)
  - Density: 3,120/km^{2} (8,090/sq mi)
- Postcode: 3191
Suburbs around Sandringham
Port Phillip Bay	Hampton	Highett
Port Phillip Bay	Sandringham	Cheltenham
Port Phillip Bay	Black Rock	Beaumaris

Sandringham (/ˈsændrɪŋhæm/ SAN-dring-ham or sometimes /ˈsændrɪŋəm/ SAN-dring-əm) is a suburb in Melbourne, Victoria, Australia, 16 km (10 mi) south of Melbourne's Central Business District, located within the City of Bayside local government area. Sandringham recorded a population of 10,926 at the 2021 census.

== History ==
Sandringham formed part of the early estates in the parish of Moorabbin purchased by Josiah Holloway in 1852. Named Gipsy Village, lots were sold between 1852 and 1854 notwithstanding little settlement taking place at the time. Bluff Town Post Office opened on 1 April 1868, closed in 1871, reopened in 1873 and was renamed Sandringham in 1887.

=== Heritage listing ===
The following place in Sandringham is listed on the Victorian Heritage Register:

- Masonic Centre (former), 23 Abbott Street, now a Council-owned community centre

== Today ==
Sandringham is one of Melbourne's bayside suburbs, located beside Port Phillip at the end of the Sandringham railway line. Sandringham is a popular location for beachgoers, sightseers, walkers, picnickers, photographers, cyclists and shoppers. It has a quaint village atmosphere with a number of cafes, coffee shops and restaurants (Greek, Chinese, Thai, Vietnamese, Indian, Japanese), take-away food outlets, gourmet food outlets, clothing stores, boutique homewares, hairdressers, professional offices, multi-story apartments, real estate agents, bakeries, a modern bookshop, a news agency, Coles supermarket, a health food store, a chemist, an award-winning library, a historical society, a large modern police station, a medical centre, a Life Saving club, a wine store, a bank, a large modern hotel (The Sandy) with a balcony overlooking the bay, an English pub with live music, a bike track and a coastal walking track.

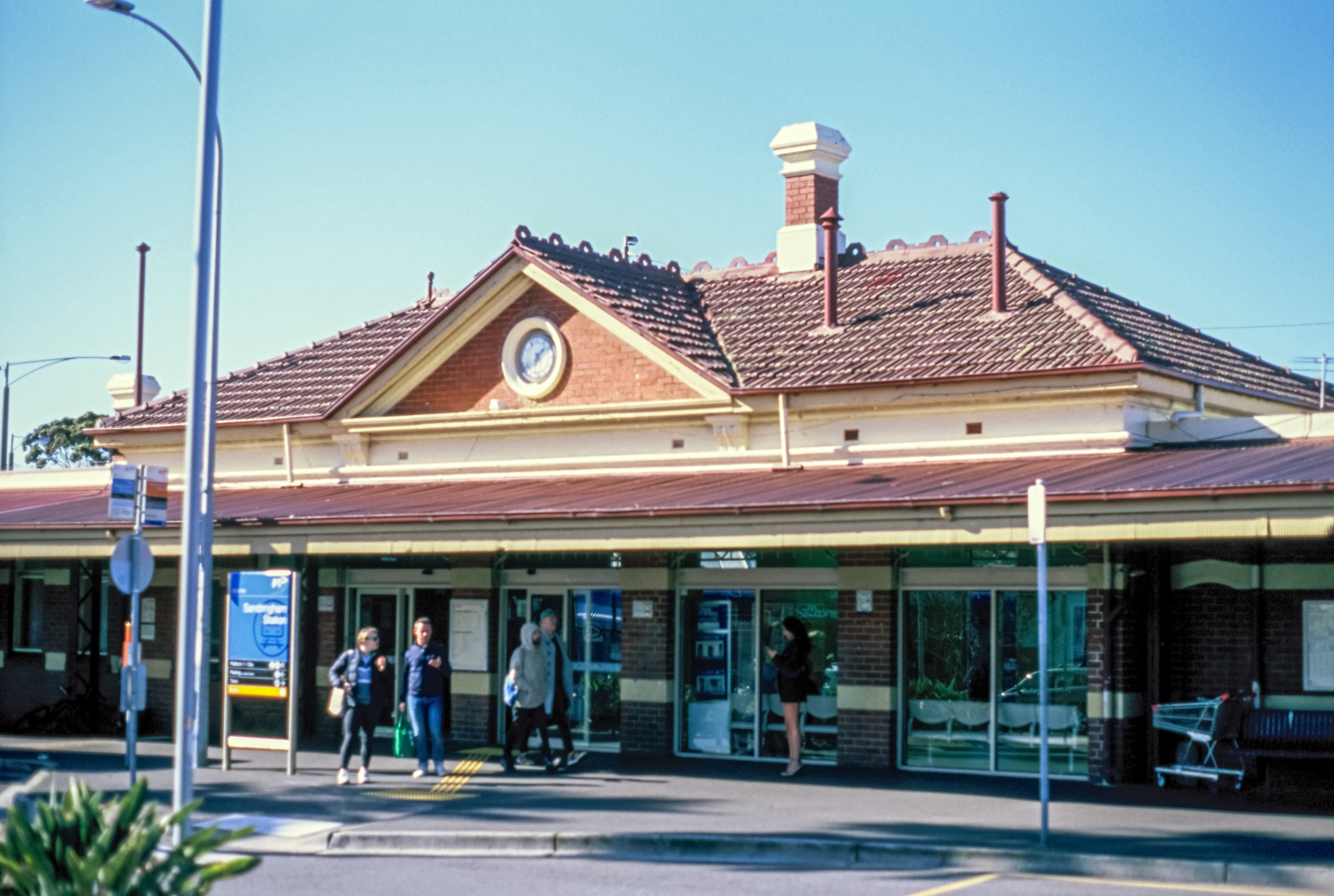
Sandringham train Station entrance

To and from the Melbourne CBD, it takes 27 minutes to reach Sandringham by train. Buses travel between the Sandringham railway station and St Kilda, Westfield Southland, Chadstone shopping centre and other places.

The Sandringham Yacht Club is host to a number of Sydney to Hobart yacht race winners.

The main streets are home to some historic buildings, including the railway station.

According to the 2011 census, the most common ancestries in Sandringham were English (29.3%), Australian (25.8%), Irish (9.7%), Scottish (9.3%), and German (3.1%).

Sandringham is home to C Company of the Australian Army Reserve unit, 5th/6th Battalion, Royal Victoria Regiment.

Sandringham was home to one of the last video rental stores which closed down in 2019.

The suburb is located within the federal division of Goldstein.

== Education ==
Sandringham Primary School, that opened in 1855, is one of the oldest schools in Victoria. Sandringham Primary partially burned down on in the early morning of 1 February 2020.

Sandringham College - a State secondary college - has two campuses in east Sandringham, one on Bluff Road (Years 7–9) and one on Holloway Road (Years 10–12).

Private schools in the area include Firbank Girls' Grammar School junior school (known as Sandringham House) and Sacred Heart Parish Catholic School. Another school in the area is Sandringham East Primary, which celebrated its 80th anniversary in 2011. The Melbourne International School of Japanese, a part-time Japanese education programme, once held its classes at Sandringham East Primary.

== Sports ==
The Sandringham Football Club, known as the Zebras, of the Victorian Football League, has had a number of players go on to play in the AFL, including Trevor Barker, Ian Cooper, radio personality Rex Hunt, Andrew Krakouer, Paul Dimattina, Matthew Warnock, Ted Richards and Tom Langdon. Its games record holder is Nick Sautner (202 games, 621 goals). The club's home ground is the Trevor Barker oval on Beach Road (opposite the end of Bridge Road).

Based at the RG Chisholm Reserve, Duncan Street, the East Sandringham Boys Cricket Club features in suburban competitions throughout the cricket season. The club has developed cricketers particularly at a junior level, notably Shane Warne who has on occasion returned to play for his junior club. The R G Chisholm Reserve (known locally as the Duncan Street Oval) is also home to the East Sandringham Junior Football Club, which produced future Brownlow Medallists Chris Judd and Jobe Watson.

The city also hosts the Sandringham Soccer Club, which features both a men's and a women's team.

The city also hosts the Sandringham Amateur Athletic Club which was founded at a meeting held on 8 April 1930. The first recorded event was an 880 yards handicap at the Beach Oval (now Sandringham Football Ground).

== Notable residents ==
- Marjorie Bick, biochemist
- Jack Cato, photographer
- Ding Dyason, historian
- Tim Flannery, scientist and Australian of the Year 2007, grew up in Sandringham in the 1950s, 1960s, and 1970s.
- Bob Hawke, Prime Minister of Australia from March 1983 to December 1991, lived in Keats Street, Sandringham, from 1958 to 1964. Hawke then moved to Royal Avenue, Sandringham in 1964.
- Brad Hodge, Australian Test cricketer and former captain of the Victorian Bushrangers.
- Jon Holland, Australian Test cricketer.
- Chris Judd, two-time AFL Brownlow Medallist, West Coast Eagles premiership captain and former Carlton Blues captain, was born in Sandringham and played football for East Sandringham Junior Football Club and then the Sandringham Dragons in the TAC Cup as a junior.
- Lisa McCune, four time Gold Logie award-winning actress
- Lisa McIntosh, Paralympic sprinter and five-time gold medallist was born in Sandringham.
- Jared Rivers, Geelong Football Club player in the Australian Football League (AFL).
- Jobe Watson, former Essendon Football Club player

== Gallery ==
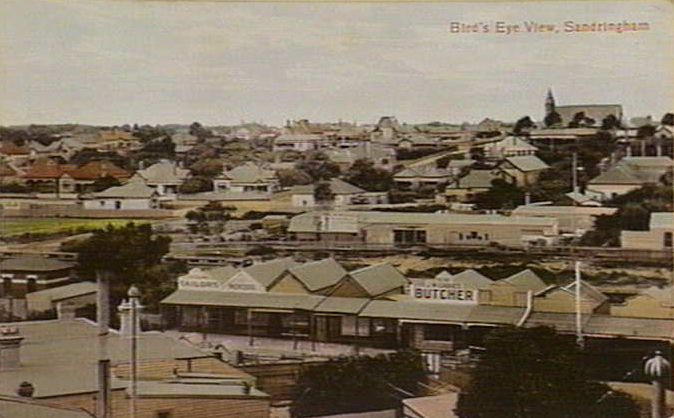
Sandringham in 1908

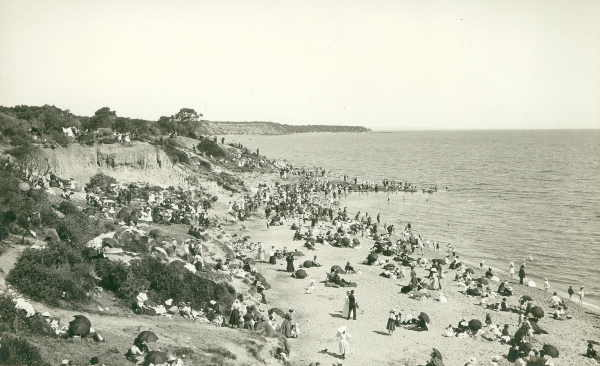
Sandringham Beach around 1915

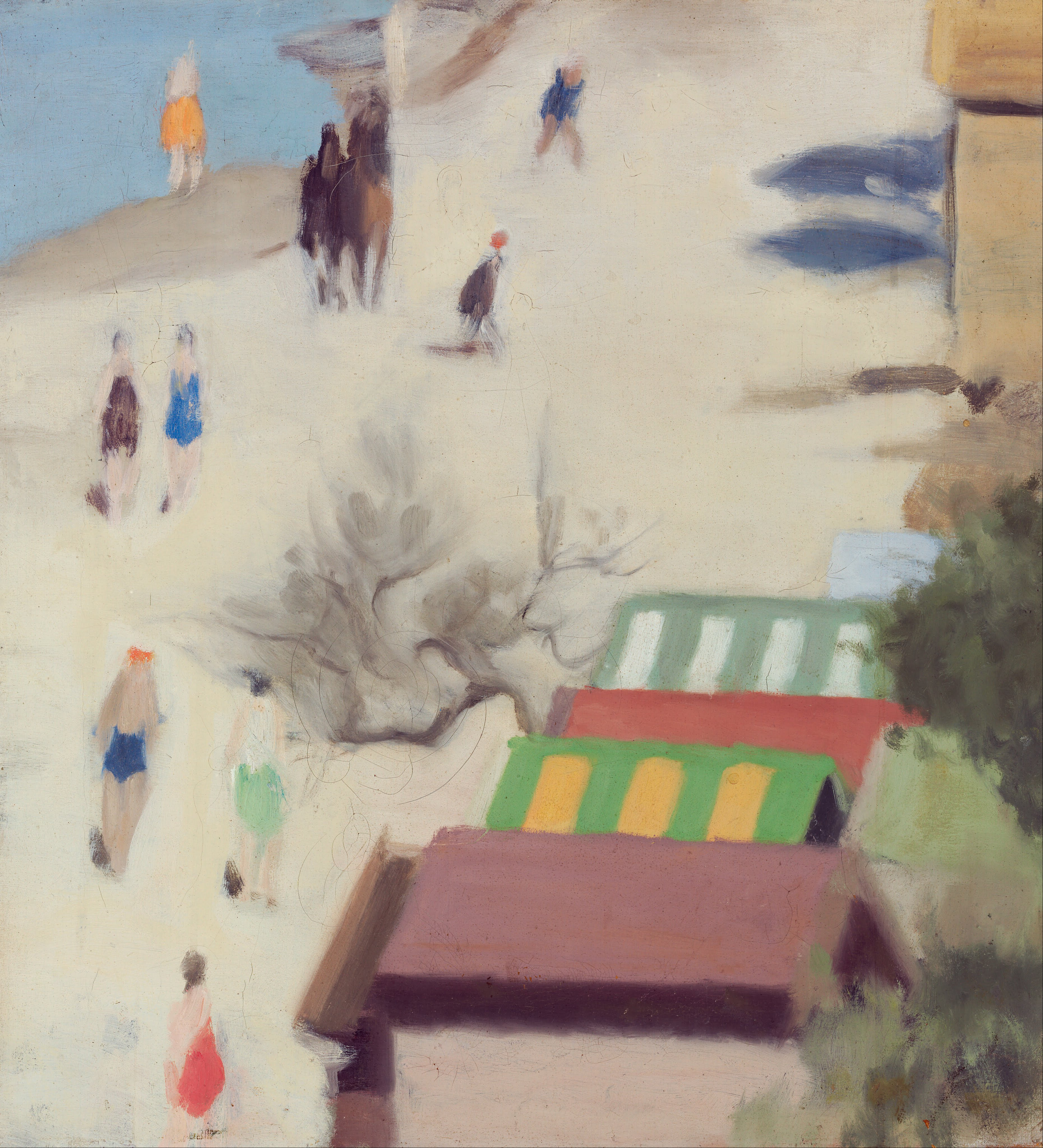
Clarice Beckett, Sandringham Beach, National Gallery of Australia

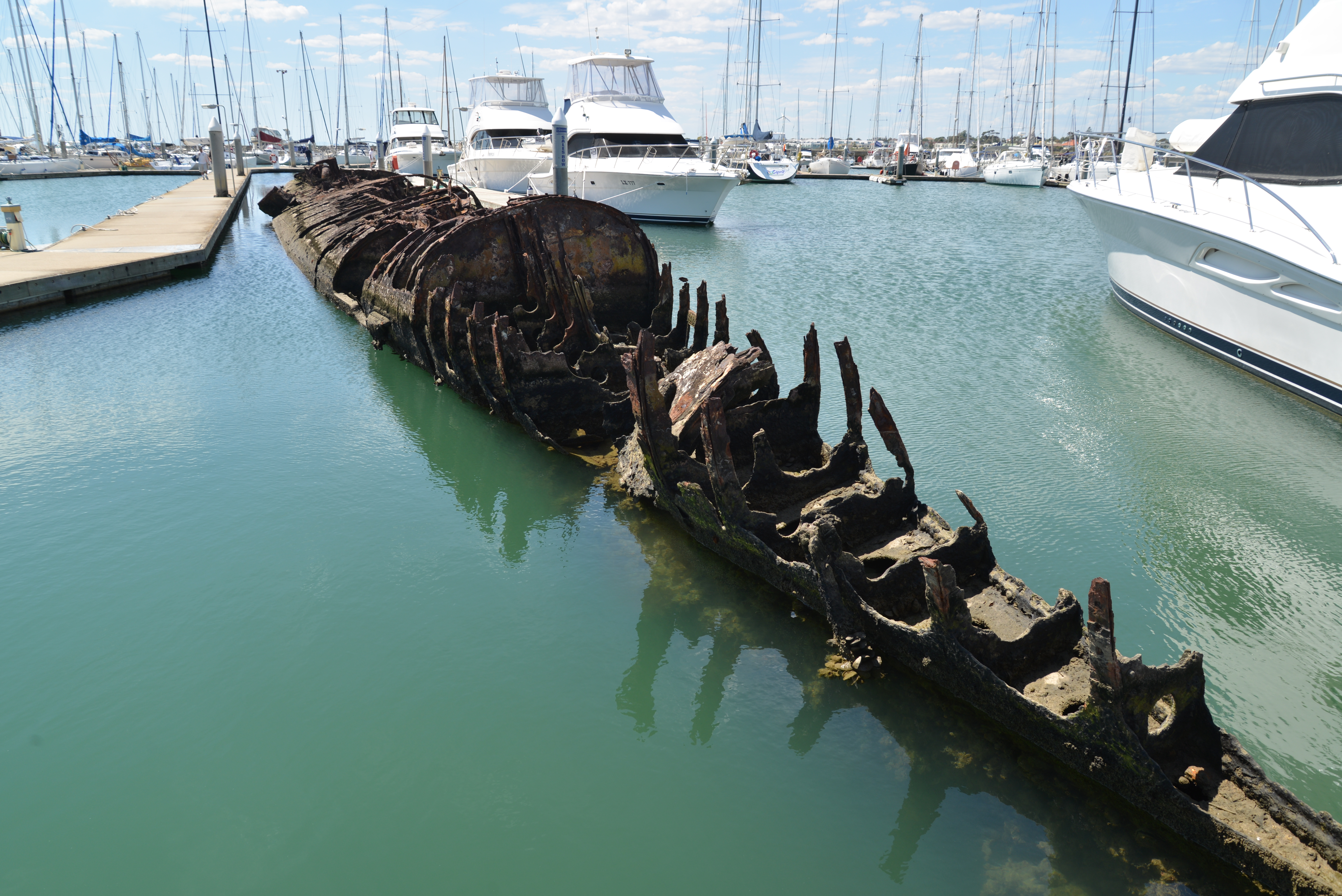
Wreck of HMAS J7 Submarine in Sandringham Yacht Club marina. Sunk as breakwater in 1927

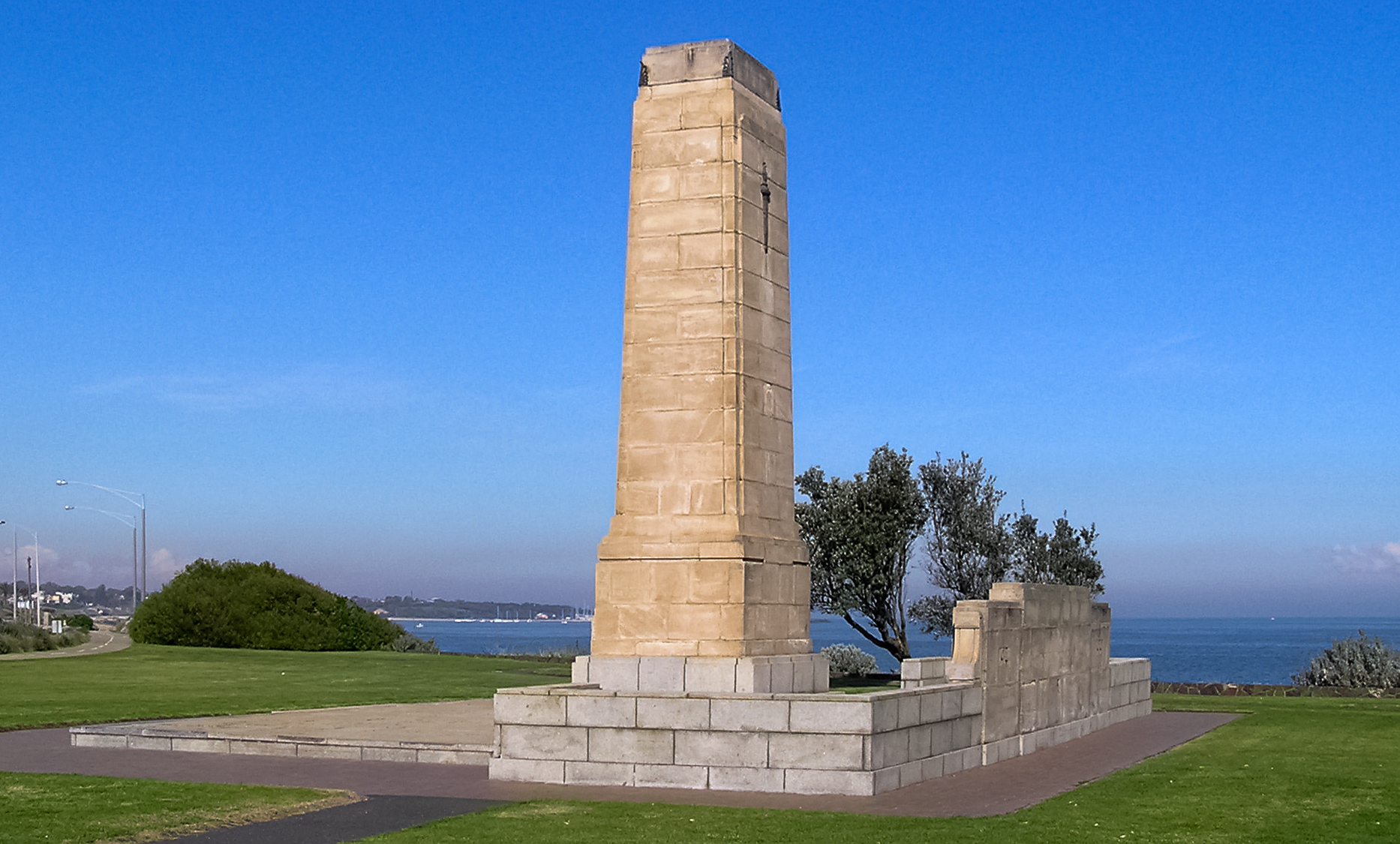
Brighton Beach Esplanade looking towards Sandringham

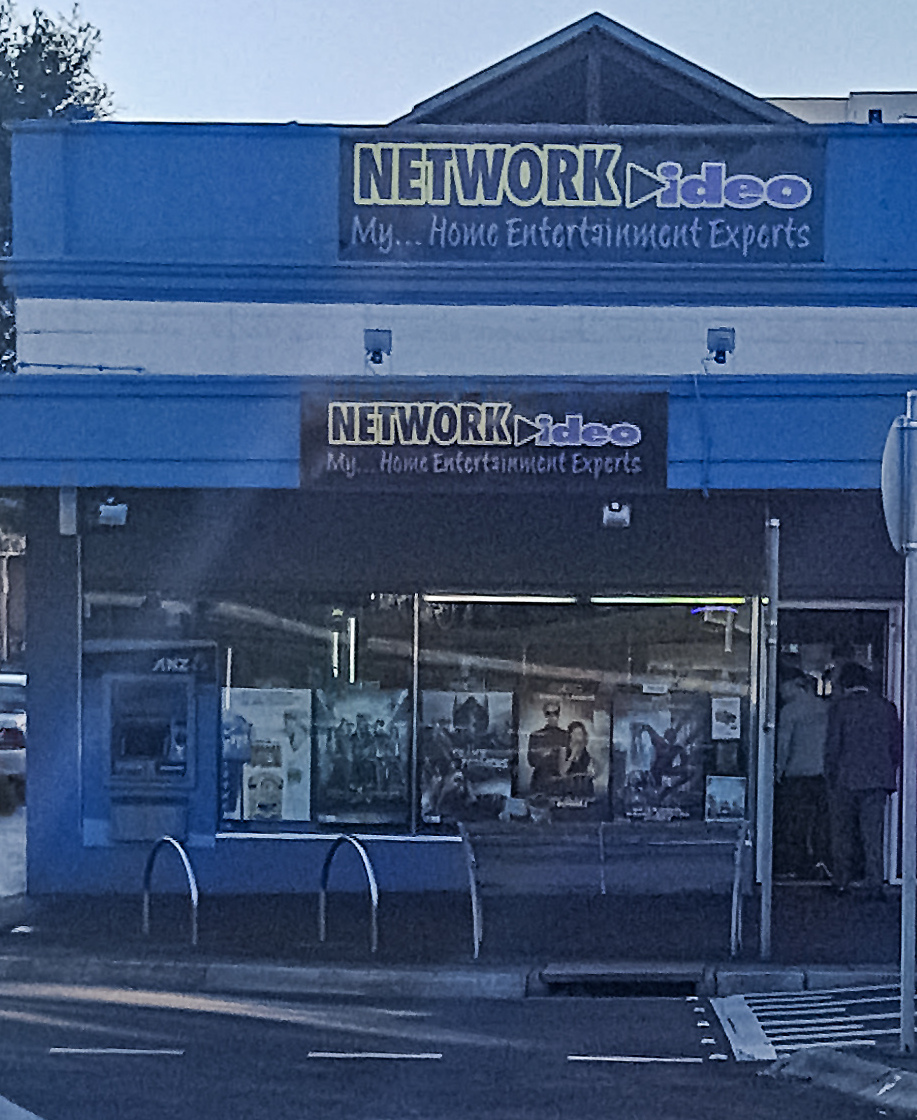
Network Video Sandringham which closed down in 2019

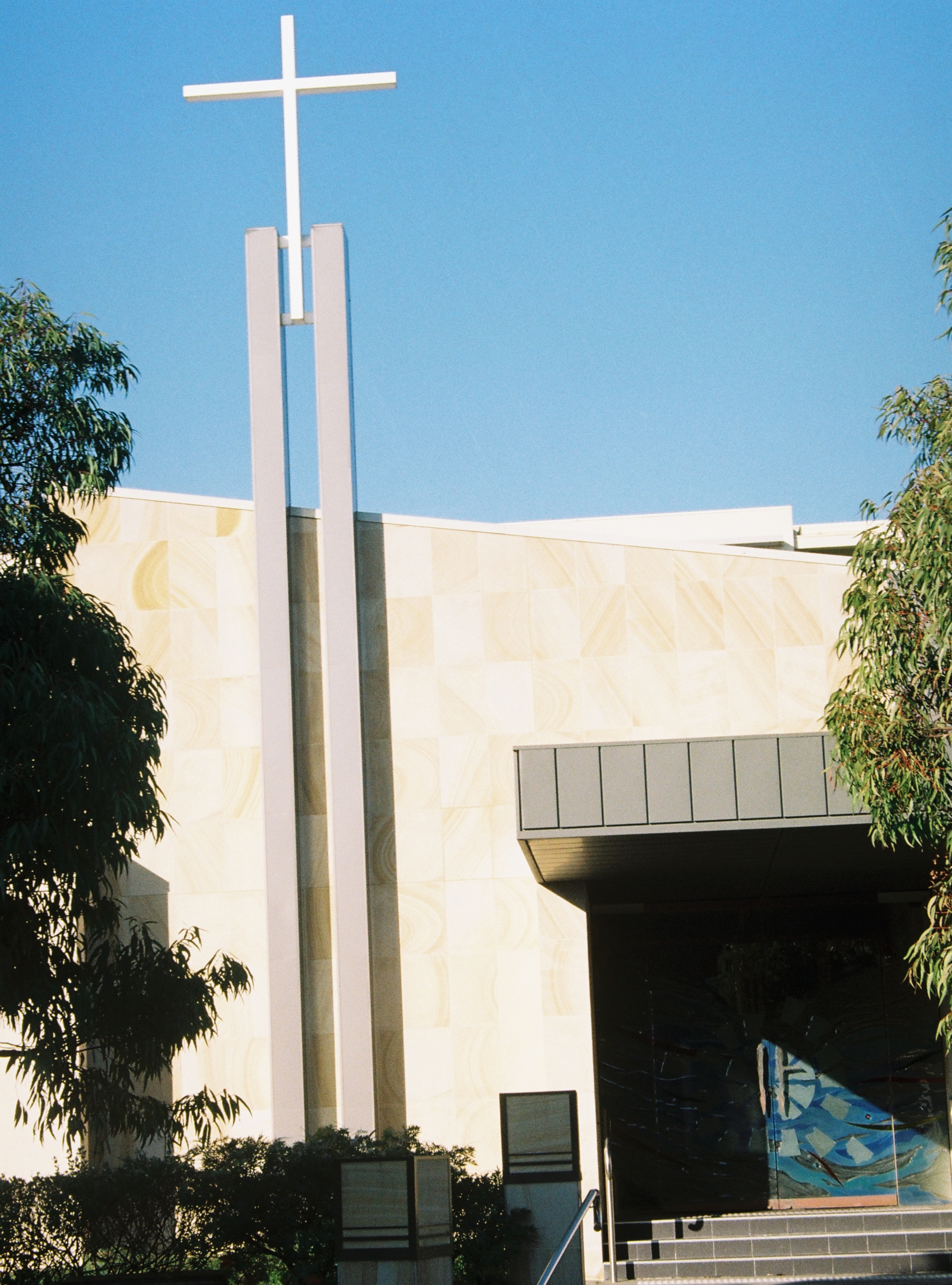
Sandringham Catholic Church

== See also ==
- City of Sandringham – Sandringham was previously within this former local government area.
