= Chelsea Clark (athlete) =

Canadian Paralympic athlete (1983–2014)

Medal record

Paralympic athletics

Representing Canada

Paralympic Games
Gold medal – first place	2004 Athens	100 metres - T34
Gold medal – first place	2004 Athens	200 metres - T34

Chelsea Clark (1983 - August 2, 2014) was a paralympic athlete from Canada who competed mainly in category T34 sprint events.

== Biography ==
Clark competed in the 2004 Summer Paralympics in Athens where she won gold in the T34 100m and 200m.

She died of neuroblastoma on August 2, 2014, aged 31.
