= Truth (Brisbane newspaper) =

Australian newspaper

The Brisbane Truth newspaper was a subsidiary of Sydney Truth, and was launched in 1890.

== Digitisation ==
The paper has been digitised as part of the Australian Newspapers Digitisation Program of the National Library of Australia.
