= The Daily Mirror (Sydney) =

Former Australian newspaper

- Type: Daily newspaper
- Format: Tabloid
- Owner: News Limited (1959–1990)
- Founder: Ezra Norton
- Founded: 1941
- Ceased publication: 1990
- Language: English
- City: Sydney
- Country: Australia
- Sister newspapers: The Daily Telegraph

The Daily Mirror was an afternoon paper established by Ezra Norton in Sydney, Australia in 1941, gaining a licence from the Minister for Trade and Customs, Eric Harrison, despite wartime paper rationing.

In October 1958, Norton and his partners sold his newspapers to the Fairfax Group, which immediately sold it to News Limited. It was merged with its morning sister paper The Daily Telegraph on 8 October 1990 to form The Daily Telegraph-Mirror, which in 1996 reverted to The Daily Telegraph, in the process removing the last vestige of the old Daily Mirror.

Frank McGuinness, father of journalist P. P. McGuinness, also played a role in launching the newspaper. In 1941, McGuinness was controversially accused of conveying betting odds before the start of a race at Ascot.

Charles Buttrose, father of Ita Buttrose (launch editor of Cleo, editor of The Australian Women's Weekly and current chair of the ABC), was a journalist on, and then the editor of, The Daily Mirror.

== See also ==
- List of newspapers in Australia
