= Radio Call =

Radio Call was a weekly magazine in South Australia published by The News, devoted to radio programs and associated artists, personalities, technology, gossip and news. This was at a time when radio was the country's prime source of entertainment, and information and a great variety of content was being produced for the medium both "live" and on transcription discs. The magazine also contained articles of more general interest and serial stories.

== History ==
The first issue appeared on the newsstands 15 July 1937, price 2 pence. Its editor was Donald Leslie Stevens (died 27 March 1953), who became editor of The News in 1949. He was succeeded by Robert "Bob" Paton.

Its only competition in the State was the ABC Weekly with a circulation of 2,000 in 1949 compared with Radio Call's 24,000. (Victoria's Listener In had a similar advantage, at 75,000 against that State's ABC Weekly with 7,000).
