= Truth (Melbourne newspaper) =

Former newspaper in Melbourne, Victoria

- Type: Weekly newspaper
- Format: Tabloid
- Owner(s): Owen Thomson & Mark Day
- Founded: 1902
- Ceased publication: 1993
- Headquarters: Melbourne, Australia
- Circulation: 400,000 (peak)

Truth was a Melbourne tabloid newspaper established in 1902 as a subsidiary of Sydney's Truth. It was "a sensational weekly paper with a large circulation, delighting while shocking its readers with its frequent exposure of personal scandal and social injustice. Detailed police and court reports, illustrated by drawings and photographs of prosecutors and defendants."

== History ==
In its early years Truth was left-leaning, and painted itself as the voice of the working class. Before 1945 it had a style of journalism that was high pitched, sensational and melodramatic. The newspaper from its earliest days was based on scandal, particularly based on the records of the divorce courts, which were not subject to restrictions on reporting.

Truth broke stories involving Agent Orange and Vietnam veterans, as well as the whole story of what happened at Maralinga with the A-bomb tests. In 1967, Richard L'Estrange broke the scandal surrounding the Melbourne-Voyager collision. Evan Whitton's report on police protection of abortion care providers led to an inquiry into the abortion protection racket of the 1960s, and the jailing of several officers.

In December 1958, Ezra Norton and the other shareholders of its holding company, Truth and Sportsman Ltd, sold their shares to the Fairfax group, which sold it on to Rupert Murdoch's News Ltd. The late Owen Thomson and Mark Day were the final owners of the paper before it folded. It is said that Dame Elisabeth Murdoch (Rupert's mother) took a dim view of the scandal sheet, which was later passed on to Thomson and Day.

In its final years, the newspaper was noted for its eclectic coverage, which combined photos of women with bare breasts on page 3 (recycled from The Sun (United Kingdom) newspaper), and tongue-in-cheek humour with hard-edged reporting, as well as the racing liftout form guide, Truform. It also had a Dorothy Dix segment page called, Heart Balm. It was last published on the 15th of May 1993.

== Sensationalist headlines ==
In 1987 one-time Liberal Party leader Sir Billy Snedden died in unusual circumstances. Snedden died of a heart attack in the Rushcutter Travelodge, possibly whilst having sexual intercourse with a mystery woman whose identity has never been revealed. As Wright and Nader point out, Snedden was known for his 'extra-curricular' activities, and in the words of his son, Drew Seddon, Billy Snedden "got around a lot." The Truth published an article under the tongue-in-cheek headline "Snedden Died on the Job - Police Seeking Deathbed Girl" to announce his death.

== Circulation ==
At its peak in the mid-1960s, the Truth sold 400,000 copies per week.

== Notable journalists and columnists ==
At one time or other, many of Australia's respected journalists worked on the paper:

- Stanley Cecil (Sol) Chandler
- Jack "Ace" Ayling
- Geoffrey Hawthorne, former editor (1984)
- Mark Hawthorne, later Victorian Publisher of Fairfax Media
- Richard L'Estrange
- John Norton
- Adrian Tame
- Owen Thomson, former Publisher
- Tim Blair
- Evan Whitton

== Digitisation ==
The paper's 1914-1918 issues have been digitised as part of the Australian Newspapers Digitisation Program project of the National Library of Australia.

== See also ==
- List of newspapers in Australia
