= Ezra Norton =

Australian newspaper baron and businessman

- Born: 8 April 1897; Watsons Bay, New South Wales, Australia
- Died: 4 January 1967 (aged 69); Vaucluse, New South Wales, Australia
- Occupations: Newspaper baron, businessman
- Father: John Norton

Ezra Norton (8 April 1897 – 4 January 1967) was an Australian newspaper baron and businessman.

== Early life ==
Norton was born in the Sydney suburb of Watsons Bay, son of the proprietor of Truth, John Norton (1858–1916) and Ada McGrath (1871–1960), whom he married some weeks later. During his childhood, he was subject to his father's drunken assaults on his mother and himself. He was educated at The Scots College, Bellevue Hill. Valerie Lawson notes that "Norton often stayed away from school and was thrashed when he did attend." After failing to matriculate twice, he was sent to Christian Brothers' College, Waverley, where he was treated better.

Norton learned the newspaper trade in his father's business. His father died in 1916, but had disinherited his wife and Ezra and left the bulk of his estate to Ezra's 9-year-old sister, Joan Norton (1907–1940). His mother Ada Norton (née McGrath) persuaded the New South Wales Parliament to backdate the new Testator's Family Maintenance Act to take effect before his father's death. Under this legislation, she succeeded in having his will rewritten in 1920 so that she and Ezra Norton each received a third of his inheritance, allowing Ezra Norton to gain control of Truth and Sportsman Ltd the publisher of the Sydney Truth, the Melbourne Truth, sister papers in Brisbane and Perth, and the Sydney Sportsman, each published on Sundays.

== Career ==
Norton attempted to widen his papers' range by adding a little discussion of culture, but they soon moved back to their traditional coverage of sport, crime, and divorce. Frank Packer's launch of the Sunday Telegraph in 1939 undermined the viability of the Sydney Truth and he attempted to fight back by establishing a daily paper, to compete with the Telegraph and The Sun, in which he succeeded despite wartime paper rationing. Norton gained a licence from the Minister for Trade and Customs, Eric Harrison, to launch the Daily Mirror in Sydney in 1941.

Frank Packer and Ezra Norton were bitter rivals in business for many years. On Derby Day 1939, Ezra Norton and Frank Packer fought it out literally, with fists, in the members' enclosure at Randwick Racecourse. Ezra Norton was awarded the Coronation Medal in May 1937 for Commerce.

In 1957, Ezra Norton's horse Straight Draw won the Melbourne Cup.

Norton was incensed by the content of Cyril Pearl's non-fiction book, Wild Men of Sydney, which was highly critical of Norton's deceased father and two other political figures of his day, William Willis and Paddy Crick. Norton was "widely believed" to have lobbied the NSW State Government for changes that in 1958 extended defamation law to cover the reputation of the dead, although the NSW Government denied that. His lawyers wrote to the book's publishers threatening legal action, but the book was published in 1958, sold well, and had reprints to at least 1970.

In October 1958, Norton and his partners sold their newspapers to the Fairfax group, from whom they were acquired by Rupert Murdoch in 1959.

Although Norton retained some business interests, by 1960 he had virtually retired from the business world. He resided at a waterfront mansion at Vaucluse until his death in 1967.

== Family ==
In 1922, Norton married an English war widow, Lillian Mary (Molly) Willoughby. Molly was a 29-year-old dancing teacher. He also adopted her infant son, John Stanley Norton. They were married for 30 years until Molly Norton died suddenly on 20 March 1952.

The following year, on 11 June 1953, Norton married Emma Georgina (Peggy) Morrison and they had one child, a daughter, Mary Norton, born in 1955.

== Death ==
Ezra Norton died of cancer in his Vaucluse home on 4 January 1967 aged 69. A large funeral was held at St Mary Magdalene Catholic Church at Rose Bay and his body was buried with his father, mother, and sister in the Norton family plot at South Head Cemetery with Catholic Rites.

He was survived by his wife Peggy, their daughter Mary and his adopted son, Dr. John Stanley Norton. His estate was valued in 1967 at $4,000,000.
