= Table tennis at the 2021 Asian Youth Para Games =

Para table tennis at the 2021 Asian Youth Para Games
- Venue: Isa Sport City (Hall B)
- Location: Bahrain
- Dates: 3–4 December

Para table tennis at the 2021 Asian Youth Para Games was held in Bahrain between 3 and 4 December 2021.

== Medal table ==
* Host nation (Bahrain)

Rank	NPC	Gold	Silver	Bronze	Total
1	Japan (JPN)	5	1	0	6
2	Thailand (THA)	3	5	1	9
3	Iran (IRI)	3	4	2	9
4	Hong Kong (HKG)	3	2	3	8
5	Iraq (IRQ)	1	2	8	11
6	Kuwait (KUW)	1	1	1	3
7	Chinese Taipei (TPE)	1	1	0	2
8	Malaysia (MAS)	1	0	2	3
9	Philippines (PHI)	0	2	1	3
10	Jordan (JOR)	0	2	0	2
11	Indonesia (INA)	0	0	4	4
12	South Korea (KOR)	0	0	2	2
Totals (12 entries)		18	20	24	62

== Medalists ==
=== Boy ===
Event	Class	Gold	Silver	Bronze
Single	2–3	Yuichiro Kitagawa; Japan	Saber Mohammed Qader; Jordan	Mustafa Muntasser Mohammed Al Ogaidi; Iraq
Single	4	Genki Saito; Japan	Kittinan Harnpichai; Thailand	Baqer Hayder Hilal Alhusseinawi; Iraq
Single	5	Norakan Chanpahaka; Thailand	Teeradech Klangmanee; Thailand	Mustafa Ghanim Abd Zaid Al Nussairi; Iraq
Single	6–7	Chi Ming Tong; Hong Kong	Mahmoud Abed Hayek; Jordan	Chi Him Kwan; Hong Kong
Single	6–7	Chi Ming Tong; Hong Kong	Mahmoud Abed Hayek; Jordan	Abdulrahmn Salman Al Shaikhli; Iraq
Single	8	Seyed Amirhossein Hosseinipour; Iran	Liandr Sultan; Philippines	Rifki Mamunudin; Indonesia
Single	8	Seyed Amirhossein Hosseinipour; Iran	Liandr Sultan; Philippines	Yoho Lau; Hong Kong
Single	9	Hayuma Abe; Japan	Mohammaderfan Gholami; Iran	Hilmi Azizi; Indonesia
Single	9	Hayuma Abe; Japan	Mohammaderfan Gholami; Iran	Brady Chin Zi Rong; Malaysia
Single	10	Mahiro Funayama; Japan	Ji Sian Su; Chinese Taipei	Omid Zolfaghari Asheghabadi; Iran
Single	10	Mahiro Funayama; Japan	Ji Sian Su; Chinese Taipei	Master Parinya Punkaew; Thailand
Single	11	Wai Lok Wan; Hong Kong	Chung Yan Leung; Hong Kong	Jae Hyeon Choi; South Korea
Single	11	Wai Lok Wan; Hong Kong	Chung Yan Leung; Hong Kong	Minhum Baek; South Korea
Team	2–5	Japan; Genki Saito; Yuichiro Kitagawa	Thailand; Norakan Chanpahaka; Teeradech Klangmanee; Kittinan Harnpichai	Iraq; Moustafa Ogaidi; Baqer Alhusseinawi
Team	2–5	Japan; Genki Saito; Yuichiro Kitagawa	Thailand; Norakan Chanpahaka; Teeradech Klangmanee; Kittinan Harnpichai	Hong Kong; Chung Cheng; Iraq; Mustafa Al Nussairi; Kuwait; Hussain Albannai
Team	6–8	Iran; Seyed Amirhossein; Arsham Ramzani	Kuwait; Mohammad Alrashidi; Philippines; Liandr Sultan; Singapore; Caleb Lee	Not awarded
Team	9–10	Chinese Taipei; Ji Sian Su; Tsung Hsieh; Hsien Chen	Japan; Hayuma Abe; Mahiro Funayama	Indonesia; Faisatul Iksan; Hilmi Aziz
Team	9–10	Chinese Taipei; Ji Sian Su; Tsung Hsieh; Hsien Chen	Japan; Hayuma Abe; Mahiro Funayama	Iran; Omid Zolfaghari; Ali Rasti; Mohammaderfan Gholami

=== Girl ===
Event	Class	Gold	Silver	Bronze
Single	2–3	Malak Ali; Kuwait	Pimrpee Hohcham; Thailand	Not awarded
Single	4–5	Wassana Sringam; Thailand	Panwas Sringam; Thailand	Not awarded
Single	6	Najlah Imad Lafta Al Dayyeni; Iraq	Zainab Hasan Farttoosi; Iraq	Not awarded
Single	7–8	Yue Ching Wong; Hong Kong	Hananeh Nejati; Iran	Tiba Mohammed Hamed Adlefi; Iraq
Single	9–10	Gloria Gracia Wong Sze; Malaysia	Fatemah Mohammadi; Iran	Cici Juliani; Indonesia
Single	9–10	Gloria Gracia Wong Sze; Malaysia	Fatemah Mohammadi; Iran	Yan Yu Lam; Hong Kong
Team	2–5	Thailand; Panwas Sringam; Wassana Sringam	Iran; Nargas Ghabeli; Iraq; Baneen Shaheed	Not awarded
Team	6–10	Iran; Hananeh Nejati; Fatemah Mohammadi	Hong Kong; Yue Ching Wong; Wing Ka Pang; Yan Yu Lam	Iraq; Najla Al Dayyeni; Noorulhuda Al Hamdawy; Tiba Adlefi
Team	6–10	Iran; Hananeh Nejati; Fatemah Mohammadi	Hong Kong; Yue Ching Wong; Wing Ka Pang; Yan Yu Lam	Malaysia; Gloria Gracia Wong Sze; Philippines; Mary Sable
