= Badminton at the 2021 Asian Youth Para Games =

- Venue: Alba Club
- Location: Bahrain
- Dates: 2–6 December
- Competitors: 33 from 14 Countries

Para badminton at the 2021 Asian Youth Para Games was held at Bahrain from 2 to 6 December.

== Medal table ==
* Host nation (Bahrain)

Rank	NPC	Gold	Silver	Bronze	Total
1	Japan (JPN)	3	0	3.5	6.5
2	India (IND)	2	6	3	11
3	Indonesia (INA)	2	1	2	5
4	Thailand (THA)	1.5	0	2	3.5
5	Chinese Taipei (TPE)	1.5	0	0	1.5
6	South Korea (KOR)	1	1	3	5
7	Iran (IRI)	0	1	0	1
7	Malaysia (MAS)	0	1	0	1
9	Bhutan (BHU)	0	0	1.5	1.5
9	Tajikistan (TJK)	0	0	1.5	1.5
11	Yemen (YEM)	0	0	0.5	0.5
Totals (11 entries)		11	10	17	38

== Medalists ==
=== Singles ===
Event	Class	Gold	Silver	Bronze
Boys' singles	WH2	Daiki Kajiwara; Japan	Yu Soo-young; South Korea	Yuui Mochizuki; Japan
Boys' singles	WH2	Daiki Kajiwara; Japan	Yu Soo-young; South Korea	Shinnichirou Ozawa; Japan
Boys' singles	SL4	Hikmat Ramdani; Indonesia	Naveen Sivakumar; India	Cho Na-dan; South Korea
Boys' singles	SL4	Hikmat Ramdani; Indonesia	Naveen Sivakumar; India	Chindanai Ninudomsak; Thailand
Boys' singles	SU5	Pu Gui-yu; Chinese Taipei	Hardik Makkar; India	Ji Sang-hoon; South Korea
Boys' singles	SU5	Pu Gui-yu; Chinese Taipei	Hardik Makkar; India	Lee Jeong-soo; South Korea
Boys' singles	SH6	Natthapong Meechai; Thailand	Muhammad Amin Azmi; Malaysia	Tomoya Ueno; Japan
Girls' singles	SL3	Sanjana Kumari; India	Shadi Jahanpahah; Iran	Mekanboeva Shabnam; Tajikistan
Girls' singles	SL4	Shiho Sawada; Japan	Jyothi Jyothi; India	Adinda Nugraheni; Indonesia
Girls' singles	SU5	Remina Suzuki; Japan	Warining Rahayu; Indonesia	Anisa Fitriyani; Indonesia
Girls' singles	SU5	Remina Suzuki; Japan	Warining Rahayu; Indonesia	Palak Kohli; India
Girls' singles	SH6	Nithya Sre Sivan; India	Wu Yu-yen; Chinese Taipei	Sapuna Subba; Bhutan

=== Doubles ===
Event	Class	Gold	Silver	Bronze
Boys' doubles	SU5	South Korea; Ji Sang-hoon; Leo Jeong-soo	India; Karan Paneer; Ruthick Ragupathi	India; Hardik Makkar; Naveen Sivakumar
Boys' doubles	SU5	South Korea; Ji Sang-hoon; Leo Jeong-soo	India; Karan Paneer; Ruthick Ragupathi	Thailand; Chindanai Ninudomsak; Nattaphon Thaweesap
Mixed doubles	SL3–SU5	Indonesia; Hikmat Ramdani; Adinda Nugraheni	India; Hardik Makkar; Sanjana Kumari	India; Nehal Gupta; Palak Kholi
Mixed doubles	SL3–SU5	Indonesia; Hikmat Ramdani; Adinda Nugraheni	India; Hardik Makkar; Sanjana Kumari	Yemen; Mohammad Abdullah Mohsen; Tajikistan; Mekanboeva Shabnam
Mixed doubles	SH6	Thailand; Natthapong Meechai; Chinese Taipei; Wu Yu-yen	India; Aditya Vadiraj Kulkarni; Nithya Sre Sivan	Japan; Tomoya Ueno; Bhutan; Sapuna Subba
