= Powerlifting at the 2021 Asian Youth Para Games =

Asian Youth Para Games

- Venue: The Art Hotel
- Location: Bahrain
- Dates: 5 December
- Competitors: 38 from 13 nations

Para powerlifting at the 2021 Asian Youth Para Games was held in Bahrain on 5 December 2021.

== Medal table ==
The number of medals won by some countries has been announced more than the number, but due to the application of the law minus one and also the lack of quorum of participants in some events and disciplines, a number of medals obtained from the final figure and announced by the organizing committee has been reduced.

* Host nation (Bahrain)

Rank	NPC	Gold	Silver	Bronze	Total
1	Uzbekistan (UZB)	3	0	0	3
2	Indonesia (INA)	2	0	0	2
2	Thailand (THA)	2	0	0	2
4	Iran (IRI)	1	0	1	2
5	Saudi Arabia (KSA)	1	0	0	1
5	South Korea (KOR)	1	0	0	1
7	Malaysia (MAS)	0	1	1	2
Totals (7 entries)		10	1	2	13

== Medalists ==
Schedule:

This is only day one results:

=== Boy ===
Youth

Event	Gold	Silver	Bronze
49 kg	Minki Cheon; South Korea	Not awarded	Not awarded
59 kg	Reza Hosseinvand; Iran	Not awarded	Not awarded

Junior

Event	Gold	Silver	Bronze
49 kg	Adnan Noorasaeed; Saudi Arabia	Mahdi Vahabiaghababaei; Iran	Ahmad Shahmim Mohd Kadri; Malaysia
54 kg	Worakiat Bonnlom; Thailand	Mohd Saiful Riduan Yusof; Malaysia	Not awarded
59 kg	Okiljon Yokubov; Uzbekistan	Not awarded	Not awarded

=== Girl ===
Youth

Event	Gold	Silver	Bronze
45 kg	Dildorakhon Nurillaeva; Uzbekistan	Not awarded	Not awarded
79 kg	Dwiska Afrilia Maharani; Indonesia	Ayesha Al Mutaiwei; United Arab Emirates	Not awarded

Junior

Event	Gold	Silver	Bronze
50 kg	Nattathida Suchatpong; Thailand	Not awarded	Not awarded
55 kg	Ozoda Olimova; Uzbekistan	Not awarded	Not awarded
+86 kg	Elsa Dewi Saputri; Indonesia	Not awarded	Not awarded
