= Boccia at the 2021 Asian Youth Para Games =

Asian Youth Para Games

- Venue: Isa Sport City (Hall D)
- Location: Bahrain
- Dates: 3–4 December
- Competitors: 43 from 11 Countries

Boccia at the 2021 Asian Youth Para Games was held in Bahrain between 3 and 4 December 2021.

== Medal table ==
* Host nation (Bahrain)

Rank	NPC	Gold	Silver	Bronze	Total
1	Thailand (THA)	8	1	4	13
2	Iran (IRI)	1	4	1	6
3	Indonesia (INA)	1	2	1	4
4	Singapore (SGP)	1	1	0	2
5	South Korea (KOR)	0	1	1	2
6	Bahrain (BHR)	0	1	0	1
6	Hong Kong (HKG)	0	1	0	1
8	Saudi Arabia (KSA)	0	0	2	2
9	United Arab Emirates (UAE)	0	0	1	1
Totals (9 entries)		11	11	10	32

== Medalists ==
=== Boy ===
Event	Class	Gold	Silver	Bronze
Boy's individual	BC1	Natthawhut Deemak; Thailand	Mohamed Alhaddar; Bahrain	Muhamad Syafa; Indonesia
Boy's individual	BC2	Phakphum Linchum; Thailand	Muhammad Satria; Indonesia	Minkyu Seo; South Korea
Boy's individual	BC3	Aloysius Gan; Singapore	Sion Jeong; South Korea	Abdullah Alsamkari; Saudi Arabia
Boy's individual	BC4	Alireza Safari; Iran	Pongsakorn Lekthongdang; Thailand	Supachok Kwanph; Thailand

=== Girl ===
Event	Class	Gold	Silver	Bronze
Girl's individual	BC1	Satanan Phromsiri; Thailand	Helia Hajiabadi; Iran	Jittra Pensut; Thailand
Girl's individual	BC2	Febriyanti Rahmadhani; Indonesia	Fatemeh Touchaei; Iran	Mitha Alhemeiri; United Arab Emirates
Girl's individual	BC3	Ladamanee Kla-Han; Thailand	Ho Yan Chan; Hong Kong	Juthamat Rattana; Thailand
Girl's individual	BC4	Chalisa Khiawjantra; Thailand	Seyedehleila Mousaviamin; Iran	Auksarapuk Chanang; Thailand

=== Mixed ===
Event	Class	Gold	Silver	Bronze
Mixed pairs	BC3	Thailand	Singapore	Saudi Arabia
Mixed pairs	BC4	Thailand	Iran	Not awarded
Mixed team	BC1/BC2	Thailand	Indonesia	Iran
