= 2025 China International (para-badminton) =

Para-badminton tournament

The 2025 China International is a para-badminton tournament which is taking place in Beijing, China from 16 to 21 September 2025.

== WH-1 ==
=== Men's Singles ===
Round of 16
D2	(United Arab Emirates) Omair Mohammad	11	6
B2	(Japan) Keita Nishimura (2)	21	21
C2	(Japan) Hiroto Iizuka	21	21
E2	(Chinese Taipei) Yu-yu Ong	5	12

Quarterfinals
A1	(Malaysia) Ikhwan Ramli (1)	21	21
B2	(Japan) Keita Nishimura (2)	11	19
D1	(South Korea) Jeong Jaegun	21	21
A2	(Japan) Shoichiro Eguchi	13	14
E1	(India) Prem Kumar Ale (5)	16	8
C1	(South Korea) Jin Gibeom	21	21
C2	(Japan) Hiroto Iizuka	19	7
B1	(China) Qu Zimo	21	21

Semifinals
A1	(Malaysia) Ikhwan Ramli (1)	21	21
D1	(South Korea) Jeong Jaegun	15	15
C1	(South Korea) Jin Gibeom	11	13
B1	(China) Qu Zimo	21	21

Finals
A1	(Malaysia) Ikhwan Ramli (1)	12	4
B1	(China) Qu Zimo	21	21

=== Women's Singles ===
Semifinals
A1	(Japan) Sarina Satomi (1)	21	21
B2	(Japan) Sena Tomoyose (2)	7	13
A2	(China) Fan Chaoyue	16	14
B1	(China) Yin Menglu	21	21

Finals
A1	(Japan) Sarina Satomi (1)
B1	(China) Yin Menglu

== WH-2 ==
=== Men's Singles ===
==== Seeds ====
1. (South Korea) Daiki Kajiwara (champion)
2. (South Korea) Kim Jung-jun (semi-finals)

==== Group Stage ====
Group A

Pos	Team	Pld	W	L	GF	GA	GD	PF	PA	PD	Pts	Qualification
1	(Japan) Daiki Kajiwara (1)	2	2	0	4	0	+4	84	25	+59	2	Semi-finals
2	(China) Zhao Xin	2	1	1	2	2	0	60	62	−2	1	Quarter-finals
3	(India) Abu Hubaida	2	0	2	0	4	−4	27	84	−57	0	

Updated to match(es) played on 16 September 2025. Source: BWF

Group B

Pos	Team	Pld	W	L	GF	GA	GD	PF	PA	PD	Pts	Qualification
1	(South Korea) Kim Jung-jun (2)	2	2	0	4	0	+4	84	41	+43	2	Semi-finals
2	(Japan) Reo Oyama	2	1	1	2	2	0	63	77	−14	1	Quarter-finals
3	(India) Haris Srikumar	2	0	2	0	4	−4	56	85	−29	0	

Updated to match(es) played on 16 September 2025. Source: BWF

Group C

Pos	Team	Pld	W	L	GF	GA	GD	PF	PA	PD	Pts	Qualification
1	(Japan) Takumi Matsumoto	2	2	0	4	0	+4	84	41	+43	2	Semi-finals
2	(Indonesia) Supriadi	2	1	1	2	2	0	70	60	+10	1	Quarter-finals
3	(China) Niu Mingyu	2	0	2	0	4	−4	31	84	−53	0	

Updated to match(es) played on 16 September 2025. Source: BWF

Group D

Pos	Team	Pld	W	L	GF	GA	GD	PF	PA	PD	Pts	Qualification
1	(South Korea) Yu Soo-young	2	2	0	4	0	+4	84	37	+47	2	Semi-finals
2	(China) Wu Xincheng	2	1	1	2	2	0	64	58	+6	1	Quarter-finals
3	(Indonesia) Agus Budi Utomo	2	0	2	0	4	−4	31	84	−53	0	

Updated to match(es) played on 16 September 2025. Source: BWF

==== Elimination Round ====
Quarter-finals
A1	(Japan) Daiki Kajiwara (1)	21	21
D2	(China) Wu Xincheng	9	6
C1	(Japan) Takumi Matsumoto	8	16
B2	(Japan) Reo Oyama	21	21
A2	(China) Zhao Xin	22	12
D1	(South Korea) Yu Soo-young	24	21
C2	(Indonesia) Supriadi	10	6
B1	(South Korea) Kim Jung-jun (2)	21	21

Semi-finals
A1	(Japan) Daiki Kajiwara (1)	21	21
B2	(Japan) Reo Oyama	8	3
D1	(South Korea) Yu Soo-young	21	21
B1	(South Korea) Kim Jung-jun (2)	12	16

Final
A1	(Japan) Daiki Kajiwara (1)	21	21
D1	(South Korea) Yu Soo-young	11	5

=== Women's Singles ===
==== Seeds ====
1. (South Korea) Jung Gyeoul (group stage)
2. (China) Liu Yutong (champion)

==== Group Stage ====
Group A

Pos	Team	Pld	W	L	GF	GA	GD	PF	PA	PD	Pts	Qualification
1	(China) Xu Tingting	2	2	0	4	0	+4	86	54	+32	2	Semi-finals
2	(China) Li Hongyan	2	1	1	2	2	0	74	68	+6	1	Semi-finals
3	(South Korea) Jung Gyeoul (1)	2	0	2	0	4	−4	46	84	−38	0	

Updated to match(es) played on 16 September 2025. Source: BWF

Group B

Pos	Team	Pld	W	L	GF	GA	GD	PF	PA	PD	Pts	Qualification
1	(South Korea) Kim Jung-jun (2)	2	2	0	4	0	+4	84	41	+43	2	Semi-finals
2	(Japan) Reo Oyama	2	1	1	2	2	0	63	77	−14	1	Semi-finals
3	(India) Haris Srikumar	2	0	2	0	4	−4	56	85	−29	0	

Updated to match(es) played on 16 September 2025. Source: BWF

==== Elimination round ====
Semifinals
A1	(China) Xu Tingting	21	21
B2	(Chinese Taipei) Yang I-chen	12	11
A2	(China) Li Hongyan	12	13
B1	(China) Liu Yutong (2)	21	21

Finals
A1	(China) Xu Tingting	11	12
B1	(China) Liu Yutong (2)	21	21

== WH1-WH2 ==
=== Men's Doubles ===
Semifinals
A1	(Japan) Daiki Kajiwara (Japan) Keita Nishimura	21	21
B2	(Indonesia) Supriadi (Indonesia) Agung Widodo	12	10
A2	(India) Prem Kumar Ale (India) Abu Hubaida (1)	4	10
B1	(China) Mai Jianpeng (China) Qu Zimo (2)	21	21

Finals
A1	(Japan) Daiki Kajiwara (Japan) Keita Nishimura	10	16
B1	(China) Mai Jianpeng (China) Qu Zimo (2)	21	21

=== Women's Doubles ===
Pos	Team	Pld	W	L	GF	GA	GD	PF	PA	PD	Pts	Qualification
1	(China) Liu Yutong (China) Yin Menglu	3	3	0	6	0	+6	126	66	+60	3	Winner
2	(China) Fan Chaoyue (China) Li Hongyan	3	2	1	4	2	+2	107	76	+31	2	Runner-up
3	(China) Jiaqi Li (China) Xu Tingting	3	1	2	2	4	−2	86	125	−39	1	
4	(Chinese Taipei) Hu Guang-chiou (Chinese Taipei) Yang I-chen	3	0	3	0	6	−6	77	129	−52	0	

Updated to match(es) played on 16 September 2025. Source: BWF

== SL3 ==
=== Men's Singles ===
==== Seeds ====
1. (India) Umesh Vikram Kumar
2. (India) Jagadesh Dilli

Round of 16

Quarterfinals
A1	(India) Umesh Vikram Kumar
B1	(India) Jagadesh Dilli

Semifinals

Finals

=== Women's Singles ===
==== Seeds ====
1. (Indonesia) Qonitah Ikhtiar Syakuroh
2. (India) Mandeep Kaur

==== Group Stage ====
Group A

Pos	Team	Pld	W	L	GF	GA	GD	PF	PA	PD	Pts	Qualification
1	(China) Liu Yuemei	1	1	0	2	1	+1	61	47	+14	1	Semi-finals
2	(Indonesia) Qonitah Ikhtiar Syakuroh (1)	0	0	0	0	0	0	0	0	0	0	Quarter-finals
3	(China) Luojin Xiang	1	0	1	1	2	−1	47	61	−14	0	

Updated to match(es) played on 16 September 2025. Source: BWF

Date	Player 1	Score	Player 2	Set 1	Set 2	Set 3
16 Sept	Liu Yuemei (China)	2–1	(China) Luojin Xiang	21–13	19–21	21–13
17 Sept	Qonitah Ikhtiar Syakuroh (Indonesia)	0–0	(China) Liu Yuemei	0–0	0–0	
18 Sept	Qonitah Ikhtiar Syakuroh (Indonesia)	0–0	(China) Luojin Xiang	0–0	0–0	

Group B

Pos	Team	Pld	W	L	GF	GA	GD	PF	PA	PD	Pts	Qualification
1	(China) Feifei Gu	1	1	0	2	0	+2	42	17	+25	1	Semi-finals
2	(India) Mandeep Kaur (2)	0	0	0	0	0	0	0	0	0	0	Quarter-finals
3	(China) Gaoying Yuan	1	0	1	0	2	−2	17	42	−25	0	

Updated to match(es) played on 16 September 2025. Source: BWF

Date	Player 1	Score	Player 2	Set 1	Set 2	Set 3
16 Sept	Feifei Gu (China)	2–0	(China) Gaoying Yuan	21–7	21–10	
17 Sept	Mandeep Kaur (India)	0–0	(China) Feifei Gu	0–0	0–0	
18 Sept	Mandeep Kaur (India)	0–0	(China) Gaoying Yuan	0–0	0–0	

Group C

Pos	Team	Pld	W	L	GF	GA	GD	PF	PA	PD	Pts	Qualification
1	(Australia) Caitlin Dransfield	1	1	0	2	0	+2	42	30	+12	1	Quarter-finals
2	(India) Sanjana Kumari	0	0	0	0	0	0	0	0	0	0	Quarter-finals
3	(China) Zhizhi Zhou	1	0	1	0	2	−2	30	42	−12	0	

Updated to match(es) played on 16 September 2025. Source: BWF

Date	Player 1	Score	Player 2	Set 1	Set 2	Set 3
16 Sept	Caitlin Dransfield (Australia)	2–0	(China) Zhizhi Zhou	21–16	21–14	
17 Sept	Sanjana Kumari (India)	0–0	(Australia) Caitlin Dransfield	0–0	0–0	
18 Sept	Sanjana Kumari (India)	0–0	(China) Zhizhi Zhou	0–0	0–0	

Group D

Pos	Team	Pld	W	L	GF	GA	GD	PF	PA	PD	Pts	Qualification
1	(Japan) Shino Kawai	1	1	0	2	0	+2	42	25	+17	1	Quarter-finals
2	(India) Neeraj	0	0	0	0	0	0	0	0	0	0	Quarter-finals
3	(China) Xiao Zuxian	1	0	1	0	2	−2	25	42	−17	0	

Updated to match(es) played on 16 September 2025. Source: BWF

Date	Player 1	Score	Player 2	Set 1	Set 2	Set 3
16 Sept	Xiao Zuxian (China)	0–2	(Japan) Shino Kawai	10–21	15–21	
17 Sept	Neeraj (Indonesia)	0–0	(China) Xiao Zuxian	0–0	0–0	
18 Sept	Neeraj (Indonesia)	0–0	(Japan) Shino Kawai	0–0	0–0	

== SL4 ==
=== Seeds ===
1. (India) Sukant Kadam

=== Group Stage ===
Group A

Pos	Team	Pld	W	L	GF	GA	GD	PF	PA	PD	Pts	Qualification
1	(India) Sukant Kadam (1)	2	2	0	4	1	+3	105	83	+22	2	Quarter-finals
2	(China) Fengfei Chen	1	0	1	1	2	−1	51	63	−12	0	Round of 16
3	(Sri Lanka) Sanjeewa Madduma Kaluge	1	0	1	0	2	−2	32	42	−10	0	

Updated to match(es) played on 16 September 2025. Source: BWF

Date	Player 1	Score	Player 2	Set 1	Set 2	Set 3
16 Sept	Sukant Kadam (India)	2–0	(Sri Lanka) Sanjeewa Madduma Kaluge	21–14	21–18	
17 Sept	Sukant Kadam (India)	2–1	(China) Fengfei Chen	21–23	21–17	21–11
18 Sept	Fengfei Chen (China)	0–0	(Sri Lanka) Sanjeewa Madduma Kaluge	0–0	0–0	

== SL3-SL4 ==
=== Men's doubles ===
Quarter-finals
A1	(India) Jagadesh Dilli (India) Naveen Sivakumar (1)	21	21
C2	(China) Fengfei Chen (China) Shangshang Huang	13	10
D1	(China) Chen Xiaoyu (China) Yuzhe Yi	20	17
B2	(India) Umesh Vikram Kumar (India) Surya Kant Yadav (2)	22	21
D2	(South Korea) Cho Nadan (South Korea) Lee Seunghu	9	13
C1	(India) Pramod Bhagat (India) Sukant Kadam	21	21
A2	(China) Gao Yuyang (China) Xiong Lichuan	15	21	21
B1	(China) Erqin Ke (China) Yang Jianyuan	21	17	16

Semi-finals
A1	(India) Jagadesh Dilli (India) Naveen Sivakumar (1)	19
B2	(India) Umesh Vikram Kumar (India) Surya Kant Yadav (2)	21
C1	(India) Pramod Bhagat (India) Sukant Kadam
A2	(China) Gao Yuyang (China) Xiong Lichuan

Final

== SU-5 ==
=== Women's Singles ===
Quarter-finals
A1	(China) Yang Qiuxia	21	21
D2	(Indonesia) Warining Rahayu	11	4
D1	(China) Cheng Hefang (5)	21	21
C2	(China) Zixuan Huang (6)	10	17
B2	(Japan) Akiko Sugino (2)	16	14
C1	(France) Maud Lefort	21	21
A2	(Japan) Mamiko Toyoda (1)	14	12
B1	(China) Li Tongtong	21	21

Semi-finals
A1	(China) Yang Qiuxia	21	21
D1	(China) Cheng Hefang (5)	12	8
C1	(France) Maud Lefort
B1	(China) Li Tongtong

Final
A1	(China) Yang Qiuxia

=== Men's Doubles ===
Quarter-finals
A1	(Chinese Taipei) Fang Jen-yu (Chinese Taipei) Pu Gui Yu (1)	b	y	e
A2	(South Korea) Kang Doo-hyun (South Korea) Shin Kyung-hwan	7	10
B2	(China) He Zhirui (China) Li Mingpan	21	21
C2	(India) Rakesh Pandey (India) Dev Rathi	11	13
C1	(Singapore) Cheah Liek Hou (India) Ruthick Ragupathi	21	21
B1	(France) Meril Loquette (France) Lucas Mazur (2)	b	y	e

Semi-finals
A1	(Chinese Taipei) Fang Jen-yu (Chinese Taipei) Pu Gui Yu (1)
B2	(China) He Zhirui (China) Li Mingpan
C1	(Singapore) Cheah Liek Hou (India) Ruthick Ragupathi
B1	(France) Meril Loquette (France) Lucas Mazur (2)

Final

== SL3-SU5 ==
=== Women's Doubles ===
Semifinals
A1	(China) Feifei Gu (China) Su Kunrong
B2	(Indonesia) Warining Rahayu (Indonesia) Qonitah Syakuroh
A2	(China) Zixuan Huang (China) Gaoying Yuan
B1	(China) Li Tongtong (China) Liu Yuemei (2)

Finals

=== Mixed Doubles ===
Quarter-finals
A1	(China) Li Mingpan (China) Zhihui Zhou	21	21
D2	(China) Fengfei Chen (China) Gaoying Yuan	11	12
C1	(China) Xiong Lichuan (China) Li Tongtong	21	21
A2	(India) Chirag Baretha (India) Mandeep Kaur (1)	16	14
B2	(India) Arwaz Ansari (India) Sarumathi	15	8
D1	(China) Gao Yuyang (China) Zixuan Huang	21	21
C2	(China) He Zhirui (China) Feifei Gu	9	9
B1	(China) Yang Jianyuan (China) Yang Qiuxia (2)	21	21

Semi-finals
A1	(China) Li Mingpan (China) Zhihui Zhou	21	21
C1	(China) Xiong Lichuan (China) Li Tongtong	12	11
D1	(China) Gao Yuyang (China) Zixuan Huang	6	5
B1	(China) Yang Jianyuan (China) Yang Qiuxia (2)	21	21

Final
A1	(China) Li Mingpan (China) Zhihui Zhou
B1	(China) Yang Jianyuan (China) Yang Qiuxia (2)

== SH-6 ==
=== Men's Singles ===
Quarter-finals
A1	(China) Lin Naili	21	21
D2	(China) Luo Guangliang	7	14
D1	(Thailand) Natthapong Meechai	21	21
C2	(Indonesia) Subhan	16	14
B2	(Indonesia) Dimas Tri Aji	11	12
C1	(China) Zeng Qingtao	21	21
A2	(India) Krishna Nagar (1)	21	21
B1	(Hong Kong) Wong Chun Yim (2)	11	15

Semi-finals
A1	(China) Lin Naili	12	18
D1	(Thailand) Natthapong Meechai	21	21
C1	(China) Zeng Qingtao
A2	(India) Krishna Nagar (1)

Final
D1	(Thailand) Natthapong Meechai

=== Women's Singles ===
Semifinals
A1	(China) Lin Shuangbao	21	21
B2	(Australia) Katelyn Colley	5	3
A2	(India) Nithya Sre Sivan (1)
B1	(China) Li Fengmei (2)

Finals
A1	(China) Lin Shuangbao

=== Women's Doubles ===
Semifinals
A1	(China) Lin Naili (China) Zeng Qingtao (1)
B2	(China) Li Fengmei (China) Lin Shuangbao (3)
A2	(Indonesia) Dimas Tri Aji (Indonesia) Subhan
B1	(South Korea) Lee Dae-sung (Thailand) Natthapong Meechai (2)

Finals
