= Badminton at the 2026 Asian Para Games – Men's singles SL4 =

Men's singles SL4 event at the 2026 Asian Para Games
- Venue: Ichinomiya City Municipal Gymnasium, Ichinomiya
- Dates: 16 – 23 October 2026
- Competitors: 19 from 11 nations

Medalists
gold medal	Naveen Sivakumar	India
silver medal	Fredy Setiawan	Indonesia
bronze medal	Suhas Yathiraj	India
bronze medal	Abhijeet Sakhuja	India

The men's singles SL4 event at the 2026 Asian Para Games was played from 16 to 23 October 2026 in Ichinomiya City Municipal Gymnasium, Ichinomiya. A total of 19 players participated.

Suhas Yathiraj was the defending champion but lost the semis to the eventual gold medalist, Naveen Sivakumar. Fredy Setiawan won the silver medal, while Yathiraj and Abhijeet Sakhuja won the bronze medals respectively.

== Schedule ==
GS	Group stage	R16	Round of 16	¼	Quarterfinals	½	Semifinals	F	Final

Fri 16	Sat 17	Sun 18	Mon 19	Tue 20	Wed 21	Thu 22	Fri 23
GS	GS	—N/a	GS	R16	¼	½	F

== Seeds ==
The following players were seeded:

1. Naveen Sivakumar (IND) (gold medallist)
2. Sukant Kadam (IND) (quarter-finals)
3. Surya Kant Yadav (IND) (quarter-finals)
4. Cho Na-dan (KOR) (quarter-finals)
5. Fredy Setiawan (INA) (silver medallist)
6. Abhijeet Sakhuja (IND) (bronze medallist)

== Group stage ==
=== Group A ===
Pos	Team	Pld	W	L	GF	GA	GD	PF	PA	PD	Qualification
1	Naveen Sivakumar (IND) [1]	2	2	0	4	0	+4	84	44	+40	Quarter-finals
2	Hikmat Ramdani (INA)	2	1	1	2	2	0	64	74	−10	Round of 16
3	Jeon Sun-woo (KOR)	2	0	2	0	4	−4	54	84	−30	

Source: 2026 Asian Para Games

Date	Player 1	Score	Player 2	Game 1	Game 2	Game 3	Report
16 Oct	Hikmat Ramdani (Indonesia)	2–0	(South Korea) Jeon Sun-woo	21–15	21–17		Report
17 Oct	Naveen Sivakumar (India)	2–0	(Indonesia) Hikmat Ramdani	21–12	21–10		Report
19 Oct	Naveen Sivakumar (India)	2–0	(South Korea) Jeon Sun-woo	21–11	21–11		Report

=== Group B ===
Pos	Team	Pld	W	L	GF	GA	GD	PF	PA	PD	Qualification
1	Sukant Kadam (IND) [2]	2	2	0	4	1	+3	102	67	+35	Quarter-finals
2	Shin Kyung-hwan (KOR)	2	1	1	3	2	+1	89	92	−3	Round of 16
3	Sanjeewa Madduma (SRI)	2	0	2	0	4	−4	52	84	−32	

Source: 2026 Asian Para Games

Date	Player 1	Score	Player 2	Game 1	Game 2	Game 3	Report
16 Oct	Shin Kyung-hwan (South Korea)	2–0	(Sri Lanka) Sanjeewa Madduma	21–13	21–19		Report
17 Oct	Sukant Kadam (India)	2–1	(South Korea) Shin Kyung-hwan	21–17	18–21	21–9	Report
19 Oct	Sukant Kadam (India)	2–0	(Sri Lanka) Sanjeewa Madduma	21–11	21–9		Report

=== Group C ===
Pos	Team	Pld	W	L	GF	GA	GD	PF	PA	PD	Qualification
1	Surya Kant Yadav (IND) [3/4]	2	2	0	4	0	+4	84	59	+25	Quarter-finals
2	Chen Pengfei (CHN)	2	1	1	2	2	0	76	63	+13	Round of 16
3	Koki Ogawa (JPN) [H]	2	0	2	0	4	−4	46	84	−38	

Source: 2026 Asian Para Games

Date	Player 1	Score	Player 2	Game 1	Game 2	Game 3	Report
16 Oct	Koki Ogawa (Japan)	0–2	(China) Chen Pengfei	11–21	10–21		Report
17 Oct	Surya Kant Yadav (India)	2–0	(Japan) Koki Ogawa	21–6	21–19		Report
19 Oct	Surya Kant Yadav (India)	2–0	(China) Chen Pengfei	21–18	21–16		Report

=== Group D ===
Pos	Team	Pld	W	L	GF	GA	GD	PF	PA	PD	Qualification
1	Cho Na-dan (KOR) [3/4]	2	2	0	4	0	+4	84	33	+51	Quarter-finals
2	Mohammad Ali Imam (BAN)	2	1	1	2	2	0	64	64	0	Round of 16
3	Lee Yan Ping (HKG)	2	0	2	0	4	−4	33	84	−51	

Source: 2026 Asian Para Games

Date	Player 1	Score	Player 2	Game 1	Game 2	Game 3	Report
16 Oct	Lee Yan Ping (Hong Kong)	0–2	(Bangladesh) Mohammad Ali Imam	11–21	11–21		Report
17 Oct	Cho Na-dan (South Korea)	2–0	(Hong Kong) Lee Yan Ping	21–8	21–3		Report
19 Oct	Cho Na-dan (South Korea)	2–0	(Bangladesh) Mohammad Ali Imam	21–12	21–10		Report

=== Group E ===
Pos	Team	Pld	W	L	GF	GA	GD	PF	PA	PD	Qualification
1	Suhas Yathiraj (IND)	2	2	0	4	0	+4	84	41	+43	Round of 16
2	Fredy Setiawan (INA) [5/6]	2	1	1	2	2	0	64	68	−4	Round of 16
3	Joytu Dhar (BAN)	2	0	2	0	4	−4	45	84	−39	

Source: 2026 Asian Para Games

Date	Player 1	Score	Player 2	Game 1	Game 2	Game 3	Report
16 Oct	Joytu Dhar (Bangladesh)	0–2	(India) Suhas Yathiraj	8–21	11–21		Report
17 Oct	Fredy Setiawan (Indonesia)	2–0	(Bangladesh) Joytu Dhar	21–15	21–11		Report
19 Oct	Fredy Setiawan (Indonesia)	0–2	(India) Suhas Yathiraj	8–21	14–21		Report

=== Group F ===
Pos	Team	Pld	W	L	GF	GA	GD	PF	PA	PD	Qualification
1	Abhijeet Sakhuja (IND) [5/6]	3	3	0	6	1	+5	145	99	+46	Round of 16
2	Siripong Teamarrom (THA)	3	2	1	5	2	+3	131	126	+5	Round of 16
3	Yeh En-chuan (TPE)	3	1	2	0	4	−4	108	111	−3	
4	Prakash Adhikari (NEP)	3	0	3	0	4	−4	78	126	−48	

Source: 2026 Asian Para Games

Date	Player 1	Score	Player 2	Game 1	Game 2	Game 3	Report
16 Oct	Abhijeet Sakhuja (India)	2–0	(Chinese Taipei) Yeh En-chuan	21–17	21–12		Report
16 Oct	Siripong Teamarrom (Thailand)	2–0	(Nepal) Prakash Adhikari	21–10	21–18		Report
17 Oct	(Nepal) Prakash Adhikari	0–2	(Chinese Taipei) Yeh En-chuan	15–21	12–21		Report
17 Oct	Abhijeet Sakhuja (India)	2–1	Siripong Teamarrom (Thailand)	19–21	21–16	21–10	Report
19 Oct	Siripong Teamarrom (Thailand)	2–0	(Chinese Taipei) Yeh En-chuan	21–18	21–19		Report
19 Oct	Abhijeet Sakhuja (India)	2–0	(Nepal) Prakash Adhikari	21–11	21–12		Report

== Knockout stage ==
Round of 16
Shin Kyung-hwan (KOR)	21	18	21
Hikmat Ramdani (INA)	15	21	15
5/6	Abhijeet Sakhuja (IND)	21	21
Chen Pengfei (CHN)	8	12
Siripong Teamarrom (THA)	5	7
Suhas Yathiraj (IND)	21	21
Mohammad Ali Imam (BAN)	6	16
5/6	Fredy Setiawan (INA)	21	21

Quarter-finals
1	Naveen Sivakumar (IND)	21	21
Shin Kyung-hwan (KOR)	14	4
3/4	Surya Kant Yadav (IND)	16	12
5/6	Abhijeet Sakhuja (IND)	21	21
Suhas Yathiraj (IND)	21	21
3/4	Cho Na-dan (KOR)	12	16
5/6	Fredy Setiawan (INA)	21	18	21
2	Sukant Kadam (IND)	17	21	15

Semi-finals
1	Naveen Sivakumar (IND)	21	21
5/6	Abhijeet Sakhuja (IND)	13	15
Suhas Yathiraj (IND)	21	21	15
5/6	Fredy Setiawan (INA)	23	8	21

Final
1	Naveen Sivakumar (IND)	21	21
5/6	Fredy Setiawan (INA)	9	17
