= Malaysia at the 2021 Asian Youth Para Games =

- IPC code: MAS
- NPC: Paralympic Council of Malaysia

in Manama 2–6 December 2021
- Competitors: 13 in 6 sports
- Flag bearer: Ahmad Shahmim Mohd Kadri
- Medals Ranked 13th: Gold 3 Silver 4 Bronze 5 Total 12

Asian Youth Para Games appearances
- 2009; 2013; 2017; 2021

Malaysia competed in the 2021 Asian Youth Para Games which will be held in Manama, Bahrain from 2 to 6 December 2021. Malaysia contingent has 13 athletes who will compete in six sports and was led by chef de mission of delegation, Kumarusamy Sithambaram.

Malaysia won three gold.

== Competitors ==
The following is the list of number of competitors in the Games:

Sport	Boy	Girl	Total
Athletics	1	2	3
Badminton	1	0	1
Boccia	1	1	2
Powerlifting	2	0	2
Swimming	1	2	3
Table tennis	1	1	2
Total	7	6	13

== Medalists ==
Medal	Name	Sport	Event	Date
Gold	Zy Kher Lee	Swimming	Boys' 200 m freestyle S1-5	3 December
Gold	Ong Jia Xuan	Swimming	Girls' 100 m breaststroke SB4-9	4 December
Gold	Gloria Gracia Wong Sze	Table tennis	Girls' singles SF9-10	4 December
Silver	Nur Rohadatul Syuhada Yunus	Athletics	Girls' shot put F40-46,61-64	3 December
Silver	Zy Kher Lee	Swimming	Boys' 200 m butterfly S2-7	4 December
Silver	Mohammad Saiful Riduan Yusof	Powerlifting	Boys' 54kg	5 December
Silver	Muhammad Amin Azmi	Badminton	Boys' singles SH6	6 December
Bronze	Zy Kher Lee	Swimming	Boys' 200 m individual medley SM5-10	3 December
Bronze	Ong Jia Xuan	Swimming	Girls' 200 m individual medley SM5-10	3 December
Bronze	Heronlee Wong	Athletics	Boys' Javelin throw F35-38	5 December
Bronze	Ahmad Shahmim Mohd Kadri	Powerlifting	Boys' 49kg	5 December
Bronze	Brady Chin Zi Rong	Table Tennis	Boys' singles C9	5 December

Medals by sport
Sport	1st place, gold medalist(s)	2nd place, silver medalist(s)	3rd place, bronze medalist(s)	Total
Athletics	0	1	1	2
Badminton	0	1	0	1
Powerlifting	0	1	1	2
Swimming	2	1	2	5
Table tennis	1	0	1	2
Total	3	4	5	12

== Athletics ==
Three sportspeople competed in athletics for the Malaysia:

Boys' track events

Athlete	Events	Final	
Athlete	Events	Time	Rank
Heronlee Wong	100 m T35-38	14.11	4

Boys' field events

Athlete	Events	Final	Rank
Heronlee Wong	Discus throw F35-38	31.96	5
Heronlee Wong	Javelin throw F35-38	29.92	3rd place, bronze medalist(s)

Girls' field events

Athlete	Events	Final	Rank
Nur Rohadatul Syuhada Yunus	Shot put F40-46/61-64	4.74	2nd place, silver medalist(s)
Nur Rohadatul Syuhada Yunus	Discus throw F11-13/35-38/40-41	9.96	4

Girls' track events

Athlete	Events	Final	
Athlete	Events	Time	Rank
Nur Farhani Kudus	100 m T42-47/61-64	15.19	4
Nur Farhani Kudus	200 m T42-47/61-64	34.18	6
Nur Farhani Kudus	400 m T42-47/61-64		

== Badminton ==
Malaysia had a sole competitor in badminton.

Athlete	Event	Group Stage					Quarterfinal	Semifinal	Final / BM	
Athlete	Event	Opposition Score	Opposition Score	Opposition Score	Opposition Score	Rank	Opposition Score	Opposition Score	Opposition Score	Rank
Muhammad Amin Azmi	Boys' singles SH6	Tomoya Ueno (JPN); W (21–12, 21–7)	Md Eyamin Hossain (BAN); W (21–2, 21–2)	Aditya Vadiraj Kulkarni (IND); W (21–6, 21–6)	Natthapong Meechai (THA); L (7–21, 7–21)	—N/a				2nd place, silver medalist(s)

== Boccia ==
Two players took part in the boccia for the Malaysia.

Athlete	Event	Pool matches					Quarterfinals	Semifinals	Final / BM	
Athlete	Event	Opposition Score	Opposition Score	Opposition Score	Opposition Score	Rank	Opposition Score	Opposition Score	Opposition Score	Rank
Iman Haikal Saifulifram	Boys' Individual BC2	Minkyu Seo (KOR); L 2–4	Chun Hin Cheung (HKG); L 1–5	Phakphum Linchum (THA); L 0–12	—N/a	4	Did not advance			
Angeline Melissa Lawas	Girls' Individual BC1	Satanan Phromsiri (THA); L 3–4	Ho Si Chan (HKG); L 1–4	Helia Hajiabadi (IRI); L 6–7	Jittra Pensut (THA); W 3–1	—N/a				4

== Powerlifting ==
Two players took part in the powerlifting for Malaysia.

Athlete	Events	Final	
Athlete	Events	Results	Rank
Ahmad Shahmim Mohd Kadri	49kg	97	3rd place, bronze medalist(s)
Mohammad Saiful Riduan Yusof	54kg	70	2nd place, silver medalist(s)

== Swimming ==
Three players took part in the swimming for Malaysia.

Boys'

Athlete	Event	Final	
Athlete	Event	Result	Rank
Zy Kher Lee	50 m freestyle S1-10		
Zy Kher Lee	50 m butterfly S2-7	59.09	2nd place, silver medalist(s)
Zy Kher Lee	200 m freestyle S1-5	3:02.91	1st place, gold medalist(s)
Zy Kher Lee	200 m individual medley SM5-10	3:58.69	3rd place, bronze medalist(s)

Girls'

Athlete	Event	Final	
Athlete	Event	Result	Rank
Ong Jia Xuan	50 m freestyle S1-10		
Ong Jia Xuan	100 m freestyle S1-10	1:28.39	7
Ong Jia Xuan	100 m breaststroke SB4-9	1:42.39	1st place, gold medalist(s)
Ong Jia Xuan	200 m individual medley SM5-10	3:48.93	3rd place, bronze medalist(s)
Brenda Anellia Larry	50 m freestyle S1-10		
Brenda Anellia Larry	50 m backstroke S1-5	1:02.38	2nd place, silver medalist(s)
Brenda Anellia Larry	50m butterfly S2-7	59.01	NME
Brenda Anellia Larry	100m freestyle S1-10	2:16.19	9
Brenda Anellia Larry	150m individual medley SM1-4		

== Table tennis ==
Two players took part in the table tennis for the Malaysia.

Athlete	Event	Group stage				Quarterfinals	Semifinals	Final/BM	
Athlete	Event	Opposition Result	Opposition Result	Opposition Result	Rank	Opposition Result	Opposition Result	Opposition Result	Rank
Brady Chin Zi Rong	SM9	Hayuma Abe (JPN); L 0–3	Faisatul Iksan (INA); W 3–2	Abdullah Qasem (KUW); W W/O	2	—N/a	Mohammaderfan Gholami (IRI); L 0–3	Did not advance	3rd place, bronze medalist(s)
Gloria Gracia Wong Sze	SF9-10	Fatemah Mohammadi (IRI); W 3–2	Imas Yuniar (INA); W 3–0	—N/a	1	—N/a	Cici Juliani (INA); W 3–0	Fatemah Mohammadi (IRI); W 3–2	1st place, gold medalist(s)
