= 2026 BWF Para-Badminton World Championships – Men's Singles SL4 =

Men's Singles SL4 at 2026 BWF Para-Badminton World Championships
Tournament details
- Dates: 8–14 February 2026
- Competitors: 32
- Venue: Isa Sports City, Manama

The men's singles SL4 tournament at the 2026 BWF Para-Badminton World Championships took place from 8 to 14 February 2026 at Isa Sports City in Manama. A total of 32 players competed at the tournament.

== Classification ==
- SL4
  Players have impairment in one or both lower limbs and minimal impairment in walking/running balance (better walking/running compared to SL3)

== Format ==
The 32 players were split into 8 groups of four players. They played a round-robin tournament with the top 2 players advancing to the knockout stage. Each match was played in a best-of-3.

== Seeds ==
These were the seeds for this event:

1. (France) Lucas Mazur (champion)
2. (India) Naveen Sivakumar (final)

== Group stage ==
All times are local (UTC+3).

=== Group A ===
Pos	Team	Pld	W	L	GF	GA	GD	PF	PA	PD	Pts	Qualification
1	Lucas Mazur (FRA) [1]	3	3	0	6	0	+6	126	31	+95	3	Knockout stage
2	Maximiliano Avila Sosa (MEX)	3	2	1	4	2	+2	95	83	+12	2	Knockout stage
3	Rickard Nilsson (SWE)	3	1	2	2	4	−2	83	106	−23	1	
4	Benson Nduva Mutiso (KEN)	3	0	3	0	6	−6	42	126	−84	0	

Source: BWFBadminton.com

Date	Time	Player 1	Score	Player 2	Set 1	Set 2	Set 3
8 February	09:00	[1] Lucas Mazur (France)	2–0	(Mexico) Maximiliano Avila Sosa	21–8	21–3	
8 February	12:30	Rickard Nilsson (Sweden)	2–0	(Kenya) Benson Nduva Mutiso	21–8	21–14	
10 February	09:00	Benson Nduva Mutiso (Kenya)	0–2	(Mexico) Maximiliano Avila Sosa	6–21	7–21	
10 February	10:30	[1] Lucas Mazur (France)	2–0	(Sweden) Rickard Nilsson	21–4	21–9	
11 February	11:00	[1] Lucas Mazur (France)	2–0	(Kenya) Benson Nduva Mutiso	21–6	21–1	
11 February	11:00	Rickard Nilsson (Sweden)	0–2	(Mexico) Maximiliano Avila Sosa	12–21	16–21	

=== Group B ===
Pos	Team	Pld	W	L	GF	GA	GD	PF	PA	PD	Pts	Qualification
1	Naveen Sivakumar (IND) [2]	3	3	0	6	0	+6	126	47	+79	3	Knockout stage
2	Siripong Teamarrom (THA)	3	2	1	4	2	+2	100	89	+11	2	Knockout stage
3	Sedat Tümkaya (TUR)	3	1	2	2	4	−2	89	100	−11	1	
4	Joun Khaled Lotfy (EGY)	3	0	3	0	6	−6	47	126	−79	0	

Source: BWFBadminton.com

Date	Time	Player 1	Score	Player 2	Set 1	Set 2	Set 3
8 February	09:00	[2] Naveen Sivakumar (India)	2–0	(Thailand) Siripong Teamarrom	21–6	21–10	
8 February	09:00	Joun Khaled Lotfy (Egypt)	0–2	(Turkey) Sedat Tümkaya	7–21	9–21	
10 February	09:00	Sedat Tümkaya (Turkey)	0–2	(Thailand) Siripong Teamarrom	16–21	13–21	
10 February	10:30	[2] Naveen Sivakumar (India)	2–0	(Egypt) Joun Khaled Lotfy	21–4	21–9	
11 February	12:00	[2] Naveen Sivakumar (India)	2–0	(Turkey) Sedat Tümkaya	21–7	21–11	
11 February	12:00	Joun Khaled Lotfy (Egypt)	0–2	(Thailand) Siripong Teamarrom	8–21	10–21	

=== Group C ===
Pos	Team	Pld	W	L	GF	GA	GD	PF	PA	PD	Pts	Qualification
1	Surya Kant Yadav (IND)	3	3	0	6	0	+6	126	74	+52	3	Knockout stage
2	Nils Böning (GER)	3	2	1	4	2	+2	117	82	+35	2	Knockout stage
3	Patrick Lee Yan Ping (HKG)	3	1	2	2	4	−2	92	104	−12	1	
4	Brandon Ka Nam Poon (AUS)	3	0	3	0	6	−6	51	126	−75	0	

Source: BWFBadminton.com

Date	Time	Player 1	Score	Player 2	Set 1	Set 2	Set 3
8 February	09:30	Surya Kant Yadav (India)	2–0	(Germany) Nils Böning	21–17	21–16	
8 February	09:30	Patrick Lee Yan Ping (Hong Kong)	2–0	(Australia) Brandon Ka Nam Poon	21–10	21–10	
10 February	09:00	Brandon Ka Nam Poon (Australia)	0–2	(Germany) Nils Böning	6–21	8–21	
10 February	11:00	Surya Kant Yadav (India)	2–0	(Hong Kong) Patrick Lee Yan Ping	21–14	21–10	
11 February	12:30	Surya Kant Yadav (India)	2–0	(Australia) Brandon Ka Nam Poon	21–8	21–9	
11 February	12:30	Patrick Lee Yan Ping (Hong Kong)	0–2	(Germany) Nils Böning	10–21	16–21	

=== Group D ===
Pos	Team	Pld	W	L	GF	GA	GD	PF	PA	PD	Pts	Qualification
1	Sukant Kadam (IND)	3	3	0	6	1	+5	143	94	+49	3	Knockout stage
2	Mathis Clement (FRA)	3	2	1	4	2	+2	114	91	+23	2	Knockout stage
3	João Pedro Albuquerque Oliveira (BRA)	3	1	2	3	4	−1	125	120	+5	1	
4	Jorge Enrique Moreno (COL)	3	0	3	0	6	−6	49	126	−77	0	

Source: BWFBadminton.com

Date	Time	Player 1	Score	Player 2	Set 1	Set 2	Set 3
8 February	09:30	Sukant Kadam (India)	2–1	(Brazil) João Pedro Albuquerque Oliveira	17–21	21–14	21–13
8 February	09:30	Jorge Enrique Moreno (Colombia)	0–2	(France) Mathis Clement	9–21	5–21	
10 February	09:00	Mathis Clement (France)	2–0	(Brazil) João Pedro Albuquerque Oliveira	21–16	21–19	
10 February	11:00	Sukant Kadam (India)	2–0	(Colombia) Jorge Enrique Moreno	21–7	21–9	
11 February	12:30	Sukant Kadam (India)	2–0	(France) Mathis Clement	21–18	21–12	
11 February	12:30	Jorge Enrique Moreno (Colombia)	0–2	(Brazil) João Pedro Albuquerque Oliveira	8–21	11–21	

=== Group E ===
Pos	Team	Pld	W	L	GF	GA	GD	PF	PA	PD	Pts	Qualification
1	Marcel Adam (GER)	3	3	0	6	1	+5	143	97	+46	3	Knockout stage
2	Shin Kyung-hwan (KOR)	3	2	1	5	2	+3	137	112	+25	2	Knockout stage
3	Lachlan Boulton (AUS)	3	1	2	2	5	−3	117	137	−20	1	
4	Renzo Diquez Bances Morales (PER)	3	0	3	1	6	−5	96	147	−51	0	

Source: BWFBadminton.com

Date	Time	Player 1	Score	Player 2	Set 1	Set 2	Set 3
8 February	10:00	Marcel Adam (Germany)	2–0	(Peru) Renzo Diquez Bances Morales	21–10	21–6	
8 February	10:00	Shin Kyung-hwan (South Korea)	2–0	(Australia) Lachlan Boulton	21–13	21–13	
10 February	09:30	Lachlan Boulton (Australia)	2–1	(Peru) Renzo Diquez Bances Morales	21–17	21–23	21–13
10 February	11:00	Marcel Adam (Germany)	2–1	(South Korea) Shin Kyung-hwan	21–17	17–21	21–15
11 February	13:00	Marcel Adam (Germany)	2–0	(Australia) Lachlan Boulton	21–17	21–11	
11 February	13:00	Shin Kyung-hwan (South Korea)	2–0	(Peru) Renzo Diquez Bances Morales	21–13	21–14	

=== Group F ===
Pos	Team	Pld	W	L	GF	GA	GD	PF	PA	PD	Pts	Qualification
1	Cho Na-dan (KOR)	3	3	0	6	2	+4	164	123	+41	3	Knockout stage
2	Dilan Jacobsson (SWE)	3	2	1	5	2	+3	133	133	0	2	Knockout stage
3	Rogério Junior Xavier de Oliveira (BRA)	3	1	2	3	4	−1	130	145	−15	1	
4	Tarun (IND)	3	0	3	0	6	−6	104	130	−26	0	

Source: BWFBadminton.com

Date	Time	Player 1	Score	Player 2	Set 1	Set 2	Set 3
8 February	10:00	Rogerio Junior Xavier de Oliveira (Brazil)	1–2	(South Korea) Cho Na-dan	21–19	13–21	10–21
8 February	10:00	Tarun (India)	0–2	(Sweden) Dilan Jacobsson	20–22	11–21	
10 February	11:00	Rogerio Junior Xavier de Oliveira (Brazil)	2–0	(India) Tarun	24–22	21–17	
10 February	11:30	Dilan Jacobsson (Sweden)	1–2	(South Korea) Cho Na-dan	21–19	11–21	13–21
11 February	13:00	Rogerio Junior Xavier de Oliveira (Brazil)	0–2	(Sweden) Dilan Jacobsson	19–21	22–24	
11 February	13:00	Tarun (India)	0–2	(South Korea) Cho Na-dan	17–21	17–21	

=== Group G ===
Pos	Team	Pld	W	L	GF	GA	GD	PF	PA	PD	Pts	Qualification
1	Hikmat Ramdani (INA)	3	3	0	6	0	+6	126	76	+50	3	Knockout stage
2	Diogo Daniel (POR)	3	2	1	4	2	+2	111	97	+14	2	Knockout stage
3	Sanjeewa Perera Madduma Kaluge (SRI)	3	1	2	2	4	−2	99	101	−2	1	
4	Şükrü Gül (TUR)	3	0	3	0	6	−6	64	126	−62	0	

Source: BWFBadminton.com

Date	Time	Player 1	Score	Player 2	Set 1	Set 2	Set 3
8 February	10:30	Diogo Daniel (Portugal)	0–2	(Indonesia) Hikmat Ramdani	15–21	12–21	
8 February	10:30	Şükrü Gül (Turkey)	0–2	(Sri Lanka) Sanjeewa Perera Madduma Kaluge	9–21	8–21	
10 February	09:30	Sanjeewa Perera Madduma Kaluge (Sri Lanka)	0–2	(Indonesia) Hikmat Ramdani	11–21	11–21	
10 February	11:30	Diogo Daniel (Portugal)	2–0	(Turkey) Şükrü Gül	21–8	21–12	
11 February	13:00	Diogo Daniel (Portugal)	2–0	(Sri Lanka) Sanjeewa Perera Madduma Kaluge	21–16	21–19	
11 February	13:30	Şükrü Gül (Turkey)	0–2	(Indonesia) Hikmat Ramdani	17–21	10–21	

=== Group H ===
Pos	Team	Pld	W	L	GF	GA	GD	PF	PA	PD	Pts	Qualification
1	Fredy Setiawan (INA)	3	3	0	6	0	+6	126	58	+68	3	Knockout stage
2	Jeremiah Nnanna (NGR)	3	2	1	4	3	+1	128	100	+28	2	Knockout stage
3	Gao Yuyang (CHN)	3	1	2	3	4	−1	120	117	+3	1	
4	Andrew Fairweather (NZL)	3	0	3	0	6	−6	27	126	−99	0	

Source: BWFBadminton.com

Date	Time	Player 1	Score	Player 2	Set 1	Set 2	Set 3
8 February	10:30	Fredy Setiawan (Indonesia)	2–0	(New Zealand) Andrew Fairweather	21–6	21–3	
8 February	10:30	Gao Yuyang (China)	1–2	(Nigeria) Jeremiah Nnanna	17–21	21–19	16–21
10 February	09:30	Jeremiah Nnanna (Nigeria)	2–0	(New Zealand) Andrew Fairweather	21–2	21–2	
10 February	11:30	Fredy Setiawan (Indonesia)	2–0	(China) Gao Yuyang	21–9	21–15	
11 February	13:30	Fredy Setiawan (Indonesia)	2–0	(Nigeria) Jeremiah Nnanna	21–12	21–13	
11 February	13:30	Gao Yuyang (China)	2–0	(New Zealand) Andrew Fairweather	21–6	21–8	

== Knockout stage ==
Round of 16
1/A1	(France) Lucas Mazur	21	21
B2	(Thailand) Siripong Teamarrom	7	17
H1	(Indonesia) Fredy Setiawan	21	21
D2	(France) Mathis Clement	13	13
D1	(India) Sukant Kadam	19	21	21
G2	(Portugal) Diogo Daniel	21	16	18
F1	(South Korea) Cho Na-dan	21	23
A2	(Mexico) Maximiliano Avila Sosa	17	21
F2	(Sweden) Dilan Jacobsson	19	22	21
G1	(Indonesia) Hikmat Ramdani	21	20	17
H2	(Nigeria) Jeremiah Nnanna	21	21
C1	(India) Surya Kant Yadav	16	13
C2	(Germany) Nils Böning	14	15
E1	(Germany) Marcel Adam	21	21
E2	(South Korea) Shin Kyung-hwan	7	7
2/B1	(India) Naveen Sivakumar	21	21

Quarter-finals
1/A1	(France) Lucas Mazur	21	21
H1	(Indonesia) Fredy Setiawan	16	19
D1	(India) Sukant Kadam	21	24
F1	(South Korea) Cho Na-dan	19	22
F2	(Sweden) Dilan Jacobsson	21	19	20
H2	(Nigeria) Jeremiah Nnanna	17	21	22
E1	(Germany) Marcel Adam	19	9
2/B1	(India) Naveen Sivakumar	21	21

Semi-finals
1/A1	(France) Lucas Mazur	21	21
D1	(India) Sukant Kadam	16	3
H2	(Nigeria) Jeremiah Nnanna	9	14
2/B1	(India) Naveen Sivakumar	21	21

Final
1/A1	(France) Lucas Mazur	21	19	21
2/B1	(India) Naveen Sivakumar	12	21	14
