= Gloria Gracia Wong Sze =

Malaysian para table tennis player

Personal information
- Nationality: Malaysian
- Born: Sarawak

Sport
- Sport: Table tennis
- Disability class: 9
Medal record
Para table tennis
Representing Malaysia
Asian Youth Para Games
Gold medal – first place	2021 Manama	Girls' singles C9-10

Gloria Gracia Wong Sze is a Malaysian para table tennis player. She won a gold medal in 2021 Asian Youth Para Games.
