= Philippines at the 2013 Asian Youth Para Games =

- IPC code: PHI
- NPC: Philippine Sports Association for the Differently Abled—National Paralympic Committee of the Philippines

in Kuala Lumpur 26–30 October 2013
- Medals Ranked 18th: Gold 1 Silver 1 Bronze 5 Total 7

Asian Youth Para Games appearances
- 2009; 2013; 2017; 2021

The Philippines participated at the 2013 Asian Youth Para Games which was held in Kuala Lumpur, Malaysia from 26 to 30 October 2013. Athletes competing for the country has won one gold, one silver, and five bronze medals placing 18th overall in the medal tally. The country has never won a medal in the Asian Youth Para Games prior to their participation in this edition.

The country's first gold medal in the games was won by Jomer Anden on October 30, 2013 in the men's long jump F12 classification event. Swimmer Gary Bejino clinched the country's sole silver medal in the games through his performance in the 100-meter freestyle S7 event.

The five bronze medals of the Philippines were from: Rommel Lucencio and Julian Intan winning a bronze each in the men's single event and another bronze in the men's team event, Anden in the men's 100m dash T12 event and Bejino in the men's 100m breaststroke SB7

The Philippine men's national youth wheelchair basketball team consists of Freddie Magdayo, Ronniel Racaza, John Ericel Nicomedes, Kim Joshua Toledo, Kenneth Tapia, John Ray Escalante, Anthony Canabal, Ronualdo Catapang, and Mark Realista Calvario also took part in the games.

== Medalists ==
| Medal | Name | Sport | Event |
|---|---|---|---|
| Gold | Jomer Anden | Athletics | Men's Long Jump F12 |
| Silver | Gary Bejino | Swimming | Men's 100m Freestyle S7 |
| Bronze | Jomer Anden | Athletics | Men's 100m T12 |
| Bronze | Rommel Lucencio; Julian Intan | Table Tennis | Men's Team |
| Bronze | Rommel Lucencio | Table Tennis | Men's Single |
| Bronze | Julian Intan | Table Tennis | Men's Single |
| Bronze | Gary Bejino | Swimming | Men's 100m Breaststroke S7 |

=== Multiple ===
| Name | Sport | Gold | Silver | Bronze | Total |
|---|---|---|---|---|---|
| Jomer Anden | Athletics | 1 | 0 | 1 | 2 |
| Gary Bejino | Swimming | 0 | 1 | 1 | 2 |
| Julian Intan | Table Tennis | 0 | 0 | 2 | 2 |
| Rommel Lucencio | Table Tennis | 0 | 0 | 2 | 2 |

== Medal summary ==
=== Medals by sports ===
| Sport | Gold | Silver | Bronze | Total |
|---|---|---|---|---|
| Athletics | 1 | 0 | 1 | 2 |
| Swimming | 0 | 1 | 1 | 2 |
| Table Tennis | 0 | 0 | 3 | 3 |
| Totals (3 entries) | 1 | 1 | 5 | 7 |
