= Philippines at the 2017 Asian Youth Para Games =

- IPC code: PHI
- NPC: Paralympic Committee of the Philippines

in Dubai 10–14 December 2017
- Competitors: 12 in 5 sports
- Medals Ranked 21st: Gold 0 Silver 0 Bronze 1 Total 1

Asian Youth Para Games appearances
- 2009; 2013; 2017; 2021

The Philippines participated at the 2017 Asian Youth Para Games which was held in Dubai, United Arab Emirates from 10 to 14 December 2017. The Philippine contingent had 12 athletes competed in five sports and was led by head of delegation, Francis Cruz Diaz.

The country only won one bronze medal, placing 21st among 30 nations, and last among the nations which won at least a medal.

== Athletics ==
Three sportspeople competed in athletics for the Philippines:

- Cielo Honasan
- Rosalia Abapo
- Anthony Peralta

Honasan, a competitor in the T44 classification, placed first in the 100m run and placed second in the 200m and 400m run events but was ruled ineligible to win any medal due to failing to meet requirements regarding the measurements of her legs.

== Badminton ==
The Philippines had a sole competitor in badminton Anthony Dela Cruz Jr.

== Boccia ==
One athlete competed in boccia for the Philippines.

- Lois Matthew Lontiong

== Table tennis ==
Two players took part in the table tennis for the Philippines.

- Rommel Lucencio
- Neo Angelo Laudato

== Swimming ==
Swimmers formed the largest part of the Philippine delegation to the games with five athletes competing in swimming.

- Edwin Villanueva
- Patrick Rodel Crisostomo
- Adrian Azul
- Claire Calizo
- Judy Anne Neblasca
