= Indonesia at the 2021 Asian Youth Para Games =

- IPC code: INA
- NPC: National Paralympic Committee of Indonesia

in Manama 2–6 December 2021
- Competitors: 35 in 7 sports
- Flag bearers: Hikmat Ramdani; Dwiska Afrilia Maharani
- Medals Ranked 6th: Gold 12 Silver 11 Bronze 14 Total 37

Asian Youth Para Games appearances
- 2009; 2013; 2017; 2021

Indonesia competed in the 2021 Asian Youth Para Games which will be held in Manama, Bahrain from 2 to 6 December 2021. Indonesia contingent has 35 athletes who will compete in seven sports.

Edward Hutahayan, treasure of the National Paralympic Committee of Indonesia, is the chef de mission of the delegation.

Due to non-compliance with the new Anti-Doping rules by the World Anti-Doping Agency (WADA), Indonesia were not allowed to be represented by their flag. As a replacement, they used a flag with NPC Indonesia emblem.

== Competitors ==
The following is the list of number of competitors in the Games:

Sport	Boy	Girl	Total
Athletics	6	2	8
Badminton	4	2	6
Boccia	2	1	3
Powerlifting	0	2	2
Swimming	4	3	7
Table tennis	5	2	7
Taekwondo	2	0	2
Total	23	12	35

== Medalists ==
Medal	Name	Sport	Event	Date
Gold	Sholahuddin Al Ayyubi	Athletics	Boy's shot put F40-41	3 December
Gold	Muhammad Dimas Ubaidillah	Athletics	Boy's 400 metres T11	3 December
Gold	Firza Faturahman Listianto	Athletics	Boy's 100 metres T46	4 December
Gold	Ryan Arda Diarta	Athletics	Boy's 200 metres T44	5 December
Gold	Febriyanti Vani Rahmadhani	Boccia	Mixed individual BC2 Female	4 December
Gold	M Gerry Pahker	Swimming	100 m backstroke SB4-9	4 December
Gold	Mutiara Cantik Harsanto	Swimming	100 m butterfly S8-10	5 December
Gold	Mutiara Cantik Harsanto	Swimming	100 m backstroke S8-10	5 December
Gold	Dwiska Afrilia Maharani	Powerlifting	Women's 79 kg	5 December
Gold	Elsa Dewi Saputri	Powerlifting	Women's +86 kg	5 December
Gold	Hikmat Ramdani; Adinda Nugraheni	Badminton	Mixed doubles SL3–SU5	6 December
Gold	Hikmat Ramdani	Badminton	Men's singles SL4	6 December
Silver	Firza Faturahman Listianto	Athletics	Boy's 400 metres T46	3 December
Silver	Ryan Arda Diarta	Athletics	Boy's 100 metres T44	4 December
Silver	Muhammad Dimas Ubaidillah	Athletics	Boy's 100 metres T11	4 December
Silver	Firza Faturahman Listianto	Athletics	Boy's 200 metres T46-47	5 December
Silver	Muhammad Bintang Satria H	Boccia	Mixed individual BC2 Male	4 December
Silver	Febriyanti Vani Rahmadhani; Muhammad Bintang Satria H Muhammad Afrizal Syafa	Boccia	BC1/2 Team Mixed Gender	6 December
Silver	Mutiara Cantik Harsanto	Swimming	100 m freestyle S1-10	5 December
Silver	Mutiara Cantik Harsanto	Swimming	50 m freestyle S1-10	5 December
Silver	M Gerry Pahker	Swimming	100 m freestyle S1-10	5 December
Silver	Muhammad Rizki	Taekwondo	Men's -70 kg	3 December
Silver	Warining Rahayu	Badminton	Women's singles SU5	6 December
Bronze	Yunika Anas Tasya	Athletics	Girl's 200 metres T35-38	3 December
Bronze	Mila Sapriani	Athletics	Girl's 400 metres T42-47	4 December
Bronze	Sholahuddin Al Ayyubi	Athletics	Boy's discus F40-41	4 December
Bronze	Yunika Anas Tasya	Athletics	Girl's 100 metres T35-38	4 December
Bronze	Ryan Arda Diarta	Athletics	Boy's long jump T35-64	5 December
Bronze	Muhammad Afrizal Syafa	Boccia	Mixed individual BC1 Male	4 December
Bronze	M Gerry Pahker	Swimming	100 m butterfly SB2-7	4 December
Bronze	Rahmad Tulloh	Swimming	100 m butterfly S8-10	5 December
Bronze	Anisa Fitriyani	Badminton	Women's singles SU5	5 December
Bronze	Adinda Nugraheni	Badminton	Women's singles SU4	6 December
Bronze	Cici Juliani	Table Tennis	Single female class 9-10	6 December
Bronze	Mamunudin Rifki	Table Tennis	Single male class 8	6 December
Bronze	Azizi Hilmi	Table Tennis	Single male class 9	6 December
Bronze	Azizi Hilmi; Iksan Faisatul	Table Tennis	Team male 9-10	6 December

== Medals ==
Medals by sport
Sport	1st place, gold medalist(s)	2nd place, silver medalist(s)	3rd place, bronze medalist(s)	Total
Athletics	4	4	5	13
Swimming	3	3	2	8
Badminton	2	1	2	5
Powerlifting	2	0	0	2
Boccia	1	2	1	4
Taekwondo	0	1	0	1
Table Tennis	0	0	4	4
Total	12	11	14	37

Medals by date
Date	1st place, gold medalist(s)	2nd place, silver medalist(s)	3rd place, bronze medalist(s)	Total
3 December	2	1	1	4
4 December	4	6	6	16
5 December	4	1	3	8
6 December	2	3	4	9
Total	12	11	14	37

== Boccia ==
Men

Athlete	Event	Group Stage				Playoffs	Semifinal	Final / BM	
Athlete	Event	Opposition Score	Opposition Score	Opposition Score	Rank	Opposition Score	Opposition Score	Opposition Score	Rank
Muhamad Afrizal Syafa	Individual BC1	Ahmed (BHR); L 3–4	Marjan (BHR); W 8–0	Quintana (PHI); W 8–1	2 Q	Bye	Alhaddar (BHR); L 3–4	Quintana (PHI); W 11–0	3rd place, bronze medalist(s)
Muhammad Satria	Individual BC2	Choedchai (THA); W 5–3	Bye	Hujeoon (KOR); W 7–1	1 Q	Bye	Minkyu (KOR); W 5–2	Phakphum (THA); L 10–0	2nd place, silver medalist(s)

Women

Athlete	Event	Round 1	Round 2	Rank
Athlete	Event	Opposition Score	Opposition Score	Rank
Febriyanti Vani Rahmadhani	Individual BC2	Fatemeh (IRI); W 2*–2	Alhemeiri (UAE); W 4–1	1st place, gold medalist(s)

Mixed

Athlete	Event	Round 1	Round 2	Round 3	Rank
Athlete	Event	Opposition Score	Opposition Score	Opposition Score	Rank
Febriyanti Vani Rahmadhani; Muhammad Bintang Satria; Muhammad Afrizal Syafa	Individual BC1	Iran (IRI); W 8–4	Hongkong (HKG); W 17–0	Thailand (THA); L 3–13	2nd place, silver medalist(s)
