= Zhao Xin =

Zhao Xin may refer to:

- Zhao Xin (general) (2nd-century BC), Xiongnu general
- Zhao Xin (Jin dynasty) (died 301), Western Jin official and rebel
- Zhao Xin (speed skater, born 1992), Chinese speed skater
- Xin Zhao, a fictional character in the video game League of Legends
