= Palak Kohli =

Indian para-badminton player

Personal information
- Born: 12 August 2002 (age 24) Jalandhar, Punjab, India
- Height: 5.2 ft (158 cm)

Sport
- Country: India
- Sport: Badminton
- Coached by: Gaurav Khanna

Women's singles SU5 Women's doubles SL3–SU5 Mixed doubles SL3–SU5
- Highest ranking: 8 (WS 21 November 2021); 2 (WD with Parul Parmar 4 July 2022); 6 (XD with Pramod Bhagat 25 April 2022)
- Current ranking: 39 (WS); 3 (WD with Parul Parmar); 11 (XD with Pramod Bhagat) (8 November 2022)
- BWF profile
Medal record
Women's para-badminton
Representing India
World Championships
Bronze medal – third place	2024 Pattaya	Women's singles
Asian Youth Para Games
Silver medal – second place	2021 Manama	Doubles
Bronze medal – third place	2021 Manama	Women's singles
Bronze medal – third place	2021 Manama	Mixed doubles

Palak Kohli (born 12 August 2002) is an Indian professional para-badminton player from Jalandhar.

== Personal life ==
Palak Kohli comes from Jalandhar.

== Career ==
Kohli trains in the national training camp under Gaurav Khanna, who is the head coach of Indian para-badminton team.

In April 2021, she and Manasi Joshi both reached the finals of the Dubai Para-Badminton International at their respective singles category. She was beaten by Megan Hollander in the SU5 final.

Kohli is the only para badminton athlete from the country to qualify for both singles and women's doubles for Tokyo Paralympics 2021.

== Achievements ==
=== World Championships ===
Women's singles

Year	Venue	Opponent	Score	Result
2024	Pattaya Exhibition and Convention Hall, Pattaya, Thailand	(Indonesia) Leani Ratri Oktila	21–19, 17–21, 16–21	Bronze

=== Asian Youth Para Games ===
Women's singles

Year	Venue	Opponent	Score	Result
2021	Alba Club, Riffa, Bahrain	(Indonesia) Warining Rahayu	11–21, 12–21	Bronze

Doubles

Year	Venue	Partner	Opponent	Score	Result
2021	Alba Club, Riffa, Bahrain	(India) Sanjana Kumari	(India) Nehal Gupta (India) Abhijeet Sakhuja	15–21, 16–21	Silver

Mixed doubles

Year	Venue	Partner	Opponent	Score	Result
2021	Alba Club, Riffa, Bahrain	(India) Nehal Gupta	(India) Hardik Makkar (India) Sanjana Kumari	17–21, 16–21	Bronze

=== BWF Para Badminton World Circuit (1 title, 2 runners-up) ===
The BWF Para Badminton World Circuit – Grade 2, Level 1, 2 and 3 tournaments has been sanctioned by the Badminton World Federation from 2022.

Women's doubles

Year	Tournament	Level	Partner	Opponent	Score	Result
2022	Brazil Para Badminton International	Level 2	(India) Parul Parmar	(India) Mandeep Kaur (India) Manisha Ramdass	11–21, 11–21	(silver) Runner-up
2022	Bahrain Para Badminton International	Level 2	(India) Parul Parmar	(India) Mandeep Kaur (India) Manisha Ramdass	15–21, 15–21	(silver) Runner-up

Mixed doubles

Year	Tournament	Level	Partner	Opponent	Score	Result
2022	Spanish Para Badminton International II	Level 2	(India) Pramod Bhagat	(India) Ruthick Ragupathi (India) Manasi Girishchandra Joshi	14–21, 21–11, 21–14	(gold) Winner

=== International Tournaments (3 titles, 4 runners-up) ===
Women's singles

Year	Tournament	Opponent	Score	Result
2019	Uganda Para Badminton International	(Turkey) Zehra Bağlar	12–21, 11–21	(silver) Runner-up
2021	Dubai Para Badminton International	(Netherlands) Megan Hollander	18–21, 18–21	(silver) Runner-up
2021	Uganda Para Badminton International	(India) Shanthiya Viswanathan	21–17, 21–17	(gold) Winner

Women's doubles

Year	Tournament	Partner	Opponent	Score	Result
2019	Uganda Para Badminton International	(India) Parul Parmar	(Turkey) Zehra Bağlar (India) Manasi Girishchandra Joshi	21–15, 16–21, 21–15	(gold) Winner
2020	Peru Para Badminton International	(India) Parul Parmar	(Thailand) Nipada Saensupa (Thailand) Chanida Srinavakul	15–21, 13–21	(silver) Runner-up
2021	Uganda Para Badminton International	(India) Mandeep Kaur	(India) Parul Parmar (India) Vaishali Nilesh Patel	21–15, 21–14	(gold) Winner

Mixed doubles

Year	Tournament	Partner	Opponent	Score	Result
2021	Uganda Para Badminton International	(India) Pramod Bhagat	(India) Ruthick Ragupathi (India) Manasi Girishchandra Joshi	19–21, 16–21	(silver) Runner-up
