= Adinda Nugraheni =

Indonesian para badminton player

Personal information
- Born: 9 April 2002 (age 24) Indonesia

Sport
- Country: Indonesia
- Sport: Badminton

Women's singles SL4 Mixed doubles SL3–SU5
- Highest ranking: 17 (WS 6 April 2019); 87 (XD with Hikmat Ramdani 1 January 2019)
- Current ranking: 35 (WS) (8 November 2022)
- BWF profile
Medal record
Para-badminton
Event / 1st / 2nd / 3rd; Asian Youth Para Games / 1 / 0 / 2
Women's para-badminton
Representing Indonesia
Asian Youth Para Games
Gold medal – first place	2021 Manama	Mixed doubles
Bronze medal – third place	2017 Dubai	Girls' singles
Bronze medal – third place	2021 Manama	Girls' singles

Adinda Nugraheni (born 9 April 2002) is an Indonesian para badminton player. She won gold medal at the 2021 Asian Youth Para Games with Hikmat Ramdani in mixed doubles.

== Achievements ==
=== Asian Youth Para Games ===
Girls' singles

Year	Venue	Opponent	Score	Result
2017 (Note: This tournament uses a round robin system.)	Al Wasl Club, Dubai, United Arab Emirates	(Indonesia) Khalimatus Sadiyah	8–21, 4–21	Bronze
2017	Al Wasl Club, Dubai, United Arab Emirates	(United Arab Emirates) Salama Alkhateri	walkover	Bronze
2017	Al Wasl Club, Dubai, United Arab Emirates	(Thailand) Samownkorn Photisuppaiboon	10–21, 14–21	Bronze
2021 (Note: This tournament uses a round robin system.)	Alba Club, Manama, Bahrain	(Japan) Shiho Sawada	13–21, 15–21	Bronze
2021	Alba Club, Manama, Bahrain	(India) Jyothi Jyothi	19–21, 19–21	Bronze
2021	Alba Club, Manama, Bahrain	(Iran) Sana Bahgeri	21–18, 21–2	Bronze

Mixed doubles

Year	Venue	Partner	Opponent	Score	Result
2021	Alba Club, Manama, Bahrain	(Indonesia) Hikmat Ramdani	(India) Hardik Makkar (India) Sanjana Kumari	21–15, 21–8	Gold
