= Philippines at the 2021 Asian Youth Para Games =

- IPC code: PHI
- NPC: Paralympic Committee of the Philippines

in Manama 2–6 December 2021
- Competitors: 12 in 5 sports
- Medals Ranked 17th: Gold 1 Silver 6 Bronze 2 Total 9

Asian Youth Para Games appearances
- 2009; 2013; 2017; 2021

The Philippines participated at the 2021 Asian Youth Para Games held in Manama, Bahrain, from 2 to 6 December 2021. The Philippine contingent had 20 athletes competing in six sports.

Swimmer Ariel Joseph Alegarbes won a gold medal in the S14 100m butterfly and 2 silver medals in SB14 backstroke and breaststroke events, para-athlete Ronn Russel Mitra clinched silver in the 400m T20 event and Linard Sultan earned a silver medal in para table tennis after he lost to Iran's Seyed Hosseinipour in the men's singles class 8 finals.

== Medalists ==
Medal	Name	Sport	Event
Gold	Ariel Joseph Alegarbes	Swimming	Men's S14 100m butterfly
Silver	Ariel Joseph Alegarbes	Swimming	Men's SB14 100m backstroke
Silver	Ariel Joseph Alegarbes	Swimming	Men's SB14 100m breaststroke
Silver	Ronn Russel Mitra	Athletics	Men's 400m T20
Silver	Daniel Enderes Jr.	Athletics	Men's 1,500m T20
Silver	Linard Sultan	Table tennis	Men's individual class 8
Silver	Linard Sultan	Table tennis	Men's mixed team table
Bronze	Angel Otom	Swimming	Women's 100m butterfly S1-10 Multi class
Bronze	Mary Eloise Sable	Table tennis	Women's mixed team

== Athletics ==
Three sportspeople competed in athletics for the Philippines, all under the T20 classification:

- Ronn Russel Mitra
- Remie Rose Flores
- Daniel Enderes

== Badminton ==
The Philippines had two competitors in badminton

- Antonio dela Cruz Jr.
- Joseph Clyde Belga

== Boccia ==
One athlete competed in boccia for the Philippines.

- John Iver Quintaña (BC1 class)

== Table tennis ==
Two players took part in the table tennis for the Philippines.

- Linard Sultan
- Mary Eloise Sable

== Swimming ==
Swimmers formed the largest part of the Philippine delegation to the games with five athletes competing in swimming.

- Angel Otom (S6)
- Ariel Joseph Alegabres (S14)

== Wheelchair basketball ==
The wheelchair basketball team of the Philippines had 10 members in its roster.

- Mark Aguilar
- Mark Marquez
- Kyle Carandang
- Eljay Lamata
- Jolleniel Nebris
- Andrei Kuizon
- Jodriel Piol
- John Carl Dedala
- Anthony de Mesa
- Edgardo Ochaves

Coaches: Vernon Perea and Harry Solanoy
