= India at the 2021 Asian Youth Para Games =

- IPC code: IND
- NPC: Paralympic Committee of India

in Manama 2–6 December 2021
- Flag bearers: Palak Kohli; Praveen Kumar
- Medals Ranked 4th: Gold 12 Silver 16 Bronze 13 Total 41

Asian Youth Para Games appearances
- Not Participated 2009: 2013; Participated: 2017; 2021

India competed in the 2021 Asian Youth Para Games which was held in Manama, Bahrain from 2 to 6 December 2021. The Indian contingent competed in four sports.

== Medalists ==
Medal	Name	Sport	Event	Date
Gold	Kashish Lakra	Athletics	Women's Club Throw F51	
Gold	Vikas Bhatiwal	Athletics	Men's Discus Throw F46	
Gold	Praveen Kumar	Athletics	Men's High Jump T44	
Gold	Vikram Singh	Athletics	Men's Javelin Throw F46	
Gold	Karandeep Kumar	Athletics	Men's Long Jump T46	
Gold	Meet Tadhani	Athletics	Men's 100 m T13	
Gold	Meet Tadhani	Athletics	Men's 200 m T13	
Gold	Ishan Khandelwal	Athletics	Men's 1500 m T11	
Gold	Sanjana Kumari	Badminton	Women's Singles SL3	
Gold	Nithya Srimurthy Sivan	Badminton	Women's Singles SH6	
Silver	Rahul	Athletics	Men's High Jump T43	
Silver	Siddarth Kahar	Athletics	Men's Javelin Throw F35	
Silver	Praveen Kumar	Athletics	Men's Long Jump T44	
Silver	Darshan Soni	Athletics	Men's Long Jump T47	
Silver	Vikash Bhatiwal	Athletics	Men's Shotput F46	
Silver	Vikash Bhatiwal	Athletics	Women's Shotput F20	
Silver	Maafi	Athletics	Men's 400 m T45	
Silver	Hardik Makkar	Badminton	Men's Singles SU5	
Silver	Jyothi Jyothi	Badminton	Women's Singles SL3	
Silver	Karan Paneer Ruthick Raghupati	Badminton	Men's Singles SU5	
