= Singapore at the 2021 Asian Youth Para Games =

- IPC code: SGP
- NPC: Singapore National Paralympic Council

in Manama, Bahrain
- Competitors: 13 in 4 sports
- Flag bearer: Aloysius Gan
- Medals: Gold 3 Silver 2 Bronze 0 Total 5

Asian Youth Para Games appearances
- 2009; 2013; 2017; 2021

Singapore competed at the 2021 Asian Youth Para Games in Manama, Bahrain, from 2 to 6 December 2021. A total of 13 athletes competed in the games.

Theresa Goh is the chef de mission of the delegation.

== Competitors ==
The following is the list of number of competitors in the Games:

Sport	Boy	Girl	Total
Athletics	3	1	4
Boccia	1	1	2
Swimming	3	3	6
Table tennis	1	0	1
Total	8	5	13

== Medalist ==
Medal	Name	Sport	Event	Date
Gold	Colin Soon Jin Guang	Swimming	Boy's 400 m freestyle S11-13	4 December
Gold	Colin Soon Jin Guang	Swimming	Boy's 100 m breaststroke S11-13	4 December
