= Surya Kant Yadav =

Indian para badminton player

Surya Kant Yadav (born 28 September 2001) is an Indian para-badminton player from Delhi. He represented India at 2026 Asian Para games in Aichi Nagoya, Japan, and won a bronze medal in Men's doubles SL3-SU5 partnering Naveen Sivakumara.

== Career ==
Yadav won the bronze medal in the men's doubles SL3-SU5 category partnering Sivakumara at the 2026 Asian Para Games defeating Japan's Koki Ogawa 21-6, 21-19 in his last match. Later, the duo lost to the Indonesian pair of Suryo Nugroho and Muh Al Imran by 2-1 (8-21, 21-19, 16-21).
