= Iran at the 2021 Asian Youth Para Games =

- IPC code: IRI
- NPC: Paralympic Committee of Iran

in Manama 2–6 December 2021
- Competitors: 111 in 9 sports
- Medals Ranked 1st: Gold 44 Silver 53 Bronze 25 Total 122

Asian Youth Para Games appearances
- auto

Iran competed in the 2021 Asian Youth Para Games which will be held in Manama, Bahrain from 2 to 6 December 2021. Iran contingent has 111 athletes who will compete in nine sports.

== Competitors ==
The following is the list of number of competitors in the Games:

Sport	Boy	Girl	Total
Athletics	25	13	45
Badminton	2	2	4
Boccia	5	3	10
Goalball	6	6	3
Powerlifting	10	0	10
Swimming	15	0	20
Table tennis	5	2	10
Taekwondo	3	4	7
Wheelchair basketball	12	0	12
Total	83	28	111

== Medalists ==
Medal	Name	Sport	Event	Date

== See also ==
- Malaysia at the 2021 Asian Youth Para Games
- Thailand at the 2021 Asian Youth Para Games
- India at the 2021 Asian Youth Para Games
