= Naveen Sivakumar =

Indian para badminton player

Personal information
- Born: 28 October 2003 (age 22) Chennai, Tamil Nadu, India

Sport
- Sport: Badminton
- Handedness: Right

Men's singles SL4 Men's doubles SL3–SL4
- Highest ranking: Men's singles 2 (16 October 2025); Men's doubles 1; with Jagadesh Dilli (28 July 2025)
- Current ranking: 2 (MS, 21 October 2026); 3 (MD with Dilli, 21 October 2026)
- BWF profile
Medal record
Men's Para Badminton
Representing India
World Championships
Silver medal – second place	2026 Manama	Singles SL4
Silver medal – second place	2026 Manama	Doubles SL3-SL4
Asian Para Games
Gold medal – first place	2026 Aichi-Nagoya	Singles SL4
Bronze medal – third place	2026 Aichi-Nagoya	Doubles SL3-SU5

Naveen Sivakumar (born 28 October 2003) is an Indian para-badminton player. He won gold at the 2026 Asian Para Games and the silver medal at the 2026 Para-badminton Championships in the men's singles SL4 event.

== Early life ==
Sivakumar is from Tamil Nadu. He was born with a clubfoot leg. He took to the sport in 2016 playing with able bodied players. After learning basics under coach Madan, he started to compete in the Under 19 para events.

== Career ==
Sivakumar won the gold medal in the men's singles SL4 at the 2026 Asian Para Games by defeating Indonesia's Fredy Setiawan in straight games by 21-9, 21-17.

In 2022, he won a bronze medal in the Indian National Para Championship.
