= 2021 Asian Youth Para Games =

Youth multi-sport event

4th Asian Youth Para Games
- Host city: Manama, Bahrain
- Motto: Together. Rising. Stronger.
- Nations: 30
- Athletes: 750
- Events: 9 Sports
- Opening: 2 December
- Closing: 6 December
- Opened by: Khalid bin Hamad Al Khalifa
- Main venue: Bahrain International Circuit
- Website: https://aypg2021.org/

The 2021 Asian Youth Para Games (Arabic: الالعاب البرالمبية الاسيوية للشباب 2021, romanized: al-ʼAl'ab al-Baralimibia al-Asīawīah Lilshabab 2021), also known as the 4th Asian Youth Para Games, was the 4th edition of multi-sport event for Asian athletes with different abilities. This event held in Manama, Bahrain from 2 December to 6 December 2021. One of the multi-sport event take place despite the COVID-19 pandemic, the postponement of the Tokyo 2020 Paralympics.

== Venues ==
- Khalifa Sports City, a multi-use stadium in Isa Town.
- Isa Sports City, the national indoor sports facility.

== The Games ==
=== Participating nations ===
1. Bahrain (129)
2. Bangladesh (5)
3. Bhutan (2)
4. Cambodia (15)
5. Hong Kong (40)
6. Indonesia (35)
7. India (70)
8. Iran (111)
9. Iraq (50)
10. Jordan (30)
11. Japan (45)
12. Kyrgyzstan (5)
13. South Korea (79)
14. Saudi Arabia (50)
15. Kuwait (15)
16. Lebanon (5)
17. Malaysia (13)
18. Maldives (1)
19. Nepal (10)
20. Oman (5)
21. Pakistan (5)
22. Philippines (20)
23. Singapore (13)
24. Sri Lanka (10)
25. Thailand (107)
26. Chinese Taipei (45)
27. Tajikistan (10)
28. United Arab Emirates (40)
29. Uzbekistan (45)
30. Yemen (4)

=== Did Not Enter ===
15 Nations Did Not Enter:

1. Afghanistan
2. Brunei
3. China
4. Kazakhstan
5. North Korea
6. Laos
7. Macau
8. Mongolia
9. Myanmar
10. Palestine
11. Qatar
12. Syria
13. East Timor
14. Turkmenistan
15. Vietnam

== Sports ==
About 750 athletes under 20 years (U12-20) and Wheelchair basketball in U23:

- Athletics (113)
- Badminton (11)
- Boccia (11)
- Goalball (2)
- Powerlifting (10)
- Swimming (59)
- Table tennis (18)
- Taekwondo (9)
- Wheelchair basketball (1)

== Results ==
=== Athletics ===
Para Athletics Schedule

Para Athletics Results (incomplete)

=== Swimming ===
140 swimmers from 16 countries.

Para Swimming Schedule

Para Swimming Results

=== Taekwondo ===
Martial Arts Registration Online - 2021 Asian Youth Para Games

=== Wheelchair Basketball ===
No Teams in Girls and 7 Teams in Boys.

=== Goalball ===
3 Teams in Girls and 6 Teams in Boys.

Goalball Results

== Medal table ==
=== Primary ===
The number of medals won by some countries has been announced more than the number, but due to the application of the law minus one and also the lack of quorum of participants in some events and disciplines, a number of medals obtained from the final figure and announced by the organizing committee has been reduced.

This table was first table.

* Host nation (Bahrain)

Rank	Nation	Gold	Silver	Bronze	Total
1	Iran	44	53	25	122
2	Thailand	33	25	17	75
3	Japan	30	11	14	55
4	South Korea	14	11	22	47
5	Indonesia	12	11	14	37
6	Uzbekistan	11	1	4	16
7	India	10	15	12	37
8	Hong Kong	9	11	12	32
9	Iraq	8	6	13	27
10	Chinese Taipei	5	3	3	11
11	Singapore	4	4	1	9
12	Sri Lanka	3	5	4	12
13	Malaysia	3	4	5	12
14	Bahrain*	3	3	2	8
15	Saudi Arabia	2	5	19	26
16	United Arab Emirates	2	4	2	8
17	Philippines	1	6	2	9
18	Kuwait	1	1	1	3
18	Nepal	1	1	1	3
20	Jordan	0	2	0	2
21	Cambodia	0	1	0	1
22	Tajikistan	0	0	3	3
23	Bhutan	0	0	2	2
23	Pakistan	0	0	2	2
25	Yemen	0	0	1	1
Totals (25 entries)		196	183	181	560

No medals: 5 nations (Bangladesh, Kyrgyzstan, Lebanon, Maldives, Oman).

=== Revised medal table ===
Results Book and revised medal table in page of 238:

* Host nation (Bahrain)

Rank	Nation	Gold	Silver	Bronze	Total
1	Iran	51	58	35	144
2	Thailand	38	26	23	87
3	Japan	32	13	15	60
4	South Korea	14	11	21	46
5	India	12	17	14	43
6	Indonesia	12	11	14	37
7	Uzbekistan	11	2	5	18
8	Iraq	10	7	14	31
9	Hong Kong	9	11	12	32
10	United Arab Emirates	6	4	3	13
11	Chinese Taipei	6	3	4	13
12	Singapore	5	3	2	10
13	Bahrain*	4	5	3	12
14	Sri Lanka	4	4	4	12
15	Saudi Arabia	3	7	10	20
16	Malaysia	3	3	6	12
17	Philippines	2	5	2	9
18	Kuwait	1	1	1	3
18	Nepal	1	1	1	3
20	Jordan	0	2	0	2
21	Cambodia	0	1	0	1
22	Tajikistan	0	0	3	3
23	Bhutan	0	0	2	2
24	Pakistan	0	0	1	1
24	Yemen	0	0	1	1
Totals (25 entries)		224	195	196	615

=== Summary Reports ===
Reports, Results and Medals:

Preceded by Dubai	Asian Youth Para Games; Manama; IV Asian Youth Para Games (2021)	Succeeded by Tashkent
