= Thailand at the 2021 Asian Youth Para Games =

- IPC code: THA
- NPC: Paralympic Committee of Thailand

in Manama 2–6 December 2021
- Competitors: 107 in 9 sports
- Medals Ranked 2nd: Gold 33 Silver 25 Bronze 17 Total 75

Asian Youth Para Games appearances
- auto

Thailand competed in the 2021 Asian Youth Para Games which will be held in Manama, Bahrain from 2 to 6 December 2021. Thailand contingent has 107 athletes who will compete in nine sports.

== Competitors ==
The following is the list of number of competitors in the Games:

Sport	Boy	Girl	Total
Athletics	1	2	3
Badminton	1	0	1
Boccia	1	1	2
Goalball	1	2	3
Powerlifting	1	0	1
Swimming	1	1	2
Table tennis	2	0	2
Taekwondo	1	2	3
Wheelchair basketball	1	1	2
Total	7	6	13

== Medalists ==
Medal	Name	Sport	Event	Date
