= Wheelchair rugby at the Asian Para Games =

Wheelchair rugby has been contested in the Asian Para Games. It was held twice: in 2014 and 2026.

== Background ==
Wheelchair rugby was first included in the calendar of the Asian Para Games in the 2014 edition in Incheon, South Korea. The Korean Wheelchair Rugby Association with support of the International Wheelchair Rugby Federation and the South Korean government organized a tournament in 2013 to support the inclusion of the sport in the continental games.

The sport was not held in 2018 and 2022 editions. It returned for the 2026 Asian Para Games in Aichi and Nagoya, Japan.

== Summary ==
Year	Host	Final			Third-place game		
Year	Host	Champion	Score	Second Place	Third Place	Score	Fourth Place
2014; Details	(South Korea); Incheon	Japan	60–40	South Korea	Malaysia	50–29	Indonesia
2026; Details	(Japan); Kariya	South Korea	53–50	Japan	Thailand	—	No other teams

== Participating nations ==
Nation	(South Korea) 2014	(Japan) 2026	Overall Appearances
Indonesia	4th		1
Japan	1st	2nd	2
Malaysia	3rd		1
South Korea	2nd	1st	2
Thailand		3rd	1
