= Wheelchair basketball at the 2014 Asian Para Games =

- Venue: Samsan World Gymnasium
- Location: Incheon, South Korea
- Dates: 16–24 October

Medalists
gold medal	South Korea (men); China (women)
silver medal	Japan (men); Japan (women)
bronze medal	Iran (men); Iran (women)

Wheelchair basketball was one of the 23 sports featured at the 2nd Asian Para Games 2014, which took place in Incheon, South Korea on October 16–24, 2014. The event was held at the 7,406 seat Samsan World Gymnasium.

== Medal summary ==
=== Medal table ===
Rank	Nation	Gold	Silver	Bronze	Total
1	China (CHN)	1	0	0	1
1	South Korea (KOR)	1	0	0	1
3	Japan (JPN)	0	2	0	2
4	Iran (IRI)	0	0	2	2
Totals (4 entries)		2	2	2	6

=== Medalists ===
Event	Gold	Silver	Bronze
Men's team	South Korea (KOR) Beak Sang-Ha; Cho Seung-Hyun; Choi Jo-Han; Gim Dong-Hyeon; Han Sang-Min; Hwang Woo-Sung; Kim Chulsu; Kim Ho-Yong; Kim Ji-Nam; Kim Young-Moo; Lee Youn-Joo; Oh Dong-Suk	Japan (JPN) Mitsugu Chiwaki; Shingo Fujii; Reo Fujimoto; Takenori Ishikawa; Hiroaki Kozai; Tetsuya Miyajima; Noriyuki Mori; Hiroyuki Nagata; Satoshi Sato; Akira Toyoshima; Daisuke Tsuchiko; Takato Ueki	Iran (IRI) Abedi Morteza; Ahmadi Alireza; Ahmadi Ebrahim; Bagzadehfard Iman; Balaghi Einalou Saman; Ebrahimi Morteza; Gholamazad Vahid; Hosseinpour Cheraghlou Esmaeil; Kheradmand Milad; Sayari Mohammadhassan; Sehi Mohammad; Taheri Majid
Women's team	China (CHN) Cheng Haizhen; Dai Jiameng; Deng Mingzhu; Fu Yongqing; Li Yanhua; Liu Man; Long Yun; Wang Xiaoyan; Xu Tingting; Zheng Donghuai	Japan (JPN) Mari Amimoto; Miho Arikawa; Shoko Furuno; Mayo Hagino; Chihiro Kitada; Yui Kitama; Mayumi Tsuchida; Chika Uemura; Miki Uramoto; Amane Yanagimoto; Erika Yoshida; Izumi Zaima	Iran (IRI) Askari Fatemeh; Ferasati Neda; Hassani Zeinab; Heidari Kobra; Keshmirimoghaddam Fatemeh; Khoeini Nahid; Kohzadpour Somayeh; Soltani Roya; Soltanigerdefaramarzi Roghayeh; Tareh Jaddeh; Tavangarmarvasti Zahra; Yavarpourshahrbabaki Maryam

== Results ==
=== Men ===
==== Preliminary round ====
===== Group A =====
Team	Pld	W	L	PF	PA	PD	Pts
South Korea (KOR)	4	4	0	297	183	+114	8
Japan (JPN)	4	3	1	313	143	+170	7
Chinese Taipei (TPE)	4	2	2	191	279	–88	6
Iraq (IRQ)	4	1	3	166	245	–79	5
United Arab Emirates (UAE)	4	0	4	174	291	–117	4

October 16
10:00

Report

United Arab Emirates	54–57	Iraq
Scoring by quarter: 10–14, 23–35, 42–47, 54–57

Samsan World Gymnasium, Incheon
Referees: Orfanos Isidor Stefan (GER)

October 16
12:00

Report

Chinese Taipei	49–85	South Korea
Scoring by quarter: 8–31, 27–51, 35–73, 49–85

Samsan World Gymnasium, Incheon
Referees: Kindervater Max Robert Michael (GER)

October 17
12:00

Report

Iraq	48–54	Chinese Taipei
Scoring by quarter: 5–13, 13–25, 21–42, 48–54

Samsan World Gymnasium, Incheon
Referees: Boon Yap Poh (MAS)

October 17
14:00

Report

South Korea	59–58	Japan
Scoring by quarter: 12–21, 30–34, 47–46, 59–58

Samsan World Gymnasium, Incheon
Referees: Kindervater Max Robert Michael (GER)

October 18
10:00

Report

Japan	92–33	Chinese Taipei
Scoring by quarter: 26–11, 25–2, 23–14, 18–6

Samsan World Gymnasium, Incheon
Referees: Chompoo Wachirasrisukanya (THA)

October 19
12:00

Report

United Arab Emirates	39–91	South Korea
Scoring by quarter: 16–21, 15–23, 5–32, 3–15

Samsan World Gymnasium, Incheon
Referees: Rosenberg Helen Maree (AUS)

October 19
16:00

Report

Iraq	24–75	Japan
Scoring by quarter: 10–16, 4–18, 8–21, 2–20

Samsan World Gymnasium, Incheon
Referees: Spicer Barry John (AUS)

October 20
10:00

Report

Japan	88–27	United Arab Emirates
Scoring by quarter: 23–8, 25–1, 22–9, 18–9

Samsan World Gymnasium, Incheon
Referees: Spicer Barry John (AUS)

October 20
18:00

Report

South Korea	62–37	Iraq
Scoring by quarter: 24–12, 12–7, 16–10, 10–8

Samsan World Gymnasium, Incheon
Referees: Spicer Barry John (AUS)

October 21
14:00

Report

United Arab Emirates	54–55	Chinese Taipei
Scoring by quarter: 7–18, 13–7, 20–10, 14–20

Samsan World Gymnasium, Incheon
Referees: Suk Dong Hyun (KOR)

===== Group B =====
Team	Pld	W	L	PF	PA	PD	Pts
Iran (IRI)	4	4	0	373	172	+201	8
Thailand (THA)	4	3	1	222	215	+7	7
Malaysia (MAS)	4	2	2	195	220	–25	6
Hong Kong (HKG)	4	1	3	157	254	–97	5
Kuwait (KUW)	4	0	4	205	291	–86	4

October 16
14:00

Report

Hong Kong	36–52	Malaysia
Scoring by quarter: 9–12, 21–24, 25–34, 36–52

Samsan World Gymnasium, Incheon
Referees: Park Duk Gun (KOR)

October 16
16:00

Report

Kuwait	58–74	Thailand
Scoring by quarter: 11–22, 26–38, 48–57, 58–74

Samsan World Gymnasium, Incheon
Referees: Spicer Barry John (AUS)

October 17
10:00

Report

Iran	84–44	Malaysia
Scoring by quarter: 26–7, 48–23, 66–34, 84–44

Samsan World Gymnasium, Incheon
Referees: Rosenberg Helen Maree (AUS)

October 17
16:00

Report

Thailand	58–27	Hong Kong
Scoring by quarter: 16–1, 27–11, 44–19, 58–27

Samsan World Gymnasium, Incheon
Referees: Zhang Jun (CHN)

October 18
12:00

Report

Kuwait	43–98	Iran
Scoring by quarter: 15–21, 16–25, 4–26, 8–26

Samsan World Gymnasium, Incheon
Referees: Ngoenphotduang Somkiat (THA)

October 19
10:00

Report

Malaysia	62–58	Kuwait
Scoring by quarter: 17–10, 12–13, 11–21, 22–14

Samsan World Gymnasium, Incheon
Referees: Orfanos Isidor Stefan (GER)

October 19
14:00

Report

Iran	93–48	Thailand
Scoring by quarter: 28–10, 20–11, 23–15, 22–12

Samsan World Gymnasium, Incheon
Referees: Kindervater Max Robert Michael (GER)

October 20
12:00

Report

Thailand	42–37	Malaysia
Scoring by quarter: 3–12, 18–4, 8–9, 13–12

Samsan World Gymnasium, Incheon
Referees: Kindervater Max Robert Michael (GER)

October 20
14:00

Report

Hong Kong	37–98	Iran
Scoring by quarter: 2–31, 14–22, 12–23, 9–22

Samsan World Gymnasium, Incheon
Referees: Suk Dong Hyun (KOR)

October 21
16:00

Report

Kuwait	46–57	Hong Kong
Scoring by quarter: 14–17, 12–8, 8–12, 12–20

Samsan World Gymnasium, Incheon
Referees: Lin Chien-Hung (TPE)

==== Final round ====
Semifinals
October 22
South Korea	72
Thailand	44
October 22
Japan	84
Iran	75

Gold-medal match
October 24
Japan	50
South Korea	61
Bronze-medal match
October 23
Iran	87
Thailand	51

===== Semifinals =====
October 22
14:00

Report

South Korea	72–44	Thailand
Scoring by quarter: 19–8, 16–12, 16–8, 21–16

Samsan World Gymnasium, Incheon
Referees: Orfanos Isidor Stefan (GER)

October 22
16:00

Report

Japan	84–75	Iran
Scoring by quarter: 15–20, 14–12, 14–15, 22–18

Samsan World Gymnasium, Incheon
Referees: Kindervater Max Robert Michael (GER)

===== 9–10th-place match =====
October 22
10:00

Report

United Arab Emirates	64–52	Kuwait
Scoring by quarter: 21–4, 16–21, 10–12, 17–15

Samsan World Gymnasium, Incheon
Referees: Suk Dong Hyun (KOR)

===== 7–8th-place match =====
October 23
10:00

Report

Iraq	56–43	Hong Kong
Scoring by quarter: 16–13, 11–9, 10–13, 19–8

Samsan World Gymnasium, Incheon
Referees: Park Duk Gun (KOR)

===== 5–6th-place match =====
October 23
12:00

Report

Chinese Taipei	72–45	Malaysia
Scoring by quarter: 22–10, 19–12, 19–10, 12–13

Samsan World Gymnasium, Incheon
Referees: Spicer Barry John (AUS)

===== Bronze-medal match =====
October 23
17:00

Report

Iran	87–51	Thailand
Scoring by quarter: 22–12, 22–10, 22–8, 21–21

Samsan World Gymnasium, Incheon
Referees: Suk Dong Hyun (KOR)

===== Gold-medal match =====
October 24
12:00

Report

Japan	50–61	South Korea
Scoring by quarter: 13–22, 7–8, 14–10, 16–21

Samsan World Gymnasium, Incheon
Referees: Kindervater Max Robert Michael (GER)

==== Final standings ====
Rank	Team
1st place, gold medalist(s)	South Korea
2nd place, silver medalist(s)	Japan
3rd place, bronze medalist(s)	Iran
4	Thailand
5	Chinese Taipei
6	Malaysia
7	Iraq
8	Hong Kong
9	United Arab Emirates
10	Kuwait

=== Women ===
Team	Pld	W	L	PF	PA	PD	Pts
China (CHN)	3	3	0	287	64	+223	6
Japan (JPN)	3	2	1	210	90	+120	5
Iran (IRI)	3	1	2	82	231	–149	4
South Korea (KOR)	3	0	3	42	236	–194	3

October 20
16:00

Report

Iran	15–111	China
Scoring by quarter: 4–21, 4–24, 4–29, 3–37

Samsan World Gymnasium, Incheon
Referees: Orfanos Isidor Stefan (GER)

October 21
10:00

Report

Japan	95–14	Iran
Scoring by quarter: 33–2, 27–4, 14–8, 21–0

Samsan World Gymnasium, Incheon
Referees: Park Duk Gun (KOR)

October 21
12:00

Report

China	111–6	South Korea
Scoring by quarter: 25–0, 25–4, 27–2, 34–0

Samsan World Gymnasium, Incheon
Referees: Rosenberg Helen Maree (AUS)

October 22
12:00

Report

South Korea	11–72	Japan
Scoring by quarter: 2–20, 2–15, 5–18, 2–19

Samsan World Gymnasium, Incheon
Referees: Chompoo Wachirasrisukanya (THA)

October 23
14:00

Report

South Korea	25–53	Iran
Scoring by quarter: 9–8, 5–12, 4–14, 7–19

Samsan World Gymnasium, Incheon
Referees: Rosenberg Helen Maree (AUS)

October 24
10:00

Report

Japan	43–65	China
Scoring by quarter: 9–10, 11–17, 14–16, 9–22

Samsan World Gymnasium, Incheon
Referees: Rosenberg Helen Maree (AUS)

==== Final standings ====
Rank	Team
1st place, gold medalist(s)	China
2nd place, silver medalist(s)	Japan
3rd place, bronze medalist(s)	Iran
4	South Korea
