= Goalball at the 2014 Asian Para Games =

- Venue: Seonhak International Ice Rink
- Location: Incheon, South Korea
- Dates: 19–23 October
- Competitors: 78 from 8 nations

Medalists
gold medal	Iran (men); China (women)
silver medal	China (men); Iran (women)
bronze medal	Japan (men); Japan (women)

Goalball at the 2014 Asian Para Games was held at the Seonhak International Ice Rink in Incheon, South Korea from 19 to 23 October 2014. There were two gold medals in this sport.

== Medal summary ==
=== Medal table ===
Rank	Nation	Gold	Silver	Bronze	Total
1	China (CHN)	1	1	0	2
1	Iran (IRI)	1	1	0	2
3	Japan (JPN)	0	0	2	2
Totals (3 entries)		2	2	2	6

=== Medalists ===
Event	Gold	Silver	Bronze
Men's team	Iran (IRI) Dehghan Sajjad; Jafari Hassan; Jalilvand Mohsen; Mansouri Mohammad; Sayahi Seyed Mehdi; Soranji Mohammad	China (CHN) Hu Mingyao; Pan Chunhui; Shi Yu; Yang Mingyuan; Yu Deyi; Yu Qinquan	Japan (JPN) Ito Masatoshi; Kawashima Yuta; Hiroshi Kobayashi; Nakamura Yoshihiro; Nobusawa Yoshu; Torii Kento
Women's team	China (CHN) Ju Zhen; Lin Shan; Wang Chun Hua; Zhang Huiwen; Zhang Wei; Zhao Kaimei	Iran (IRI) Ghamsari Fatemeh; Ghanbari Zeinab; Jafarzadeh Maryam; Jalilvand Samira; Kouh Fallah Maryam; Salehizadeh Maryam	Japan (JPN) Adachi Akiko; Kakehata Eiko; Koiwai Aki; Temma Yuki; Urata Rie; Wakasugi Haruka

== Men's tournament ==
=== Preliminaries ===
==== Group A ====
Team	Pld	W	D	L	GF	GA	GD	Pts
Iran	3	3	0	0	33	8	+25	9
South Korea	3	2	0	1	24	14	+10	6
Iraq	3	1	0	2	20	25	−5	3
Mongolia	3	0	0	3	2	32	−30	0

19 October 2014; 10:00	Iran	13–4	Iraq	Seonhak International Ice Rink, Incheon; Referees: Tu X (CHN), Kultawongwattana W (THA)
19 October 2014; 10:00		Report		Seonhak International Ice Rink, Incheon; Referees: Tu X (CHN), Kultawongwattana W (THA)

19 October 2014; 16:30	South Korea	10–0	Mongolia	Seonhak International Ice Rink, Incheon; Referees: Reza D (IRI), Tu X (CHN)
19 October 2014; 16:30		Report		Seonhak International Ice Rink, Incheon; Referees: Reza D (IRI), Tu X (CHN)

20 October 2014; 11:15	Iran	10–4	South Korea	Seonhak International Ice Rink, Incheon; Referees: Saad A (IRQ), Aldarsony A (KSA)
20 October 2014; 11:15		Report		Seonhak International Ice Rink, Incheon; Referees: Saad A (IRQ), Aldarsony A (KSA)

20 October 2014; 15:15	Iraq	12–2	Mongolia	Seonhak International Ice Rink, Incheon; Referees: Tu X (CHN), Kultawongwattana W (THA)
20 October 2014; 15:15		Report		Seonhak International Ice Rink, Incheon; Referees: Tu X (CHN), Kultawongwattana W (THA)

21 October 2014; 10:00	Iraq	4–10	South Korea	Seonhak International Ice Rink, Incheon; Referees: Reza D (IRI), Aldarsony A (KSA)
21 October 2014; 10:00		Report		Seonhak International Ice Rink, Incheon; Referees: Reza D (IRI), Aldarsony A (KSA)

21 October 2014; 16:30	Iran	10–0	Mongolia	Seonhak International Ice Rink, Incheon; Referees: Tu X (CHN), Saad A (IRQ)
21 October 2014; 16:30		Report		Seonhak International Ice Rink, Incheon; Referees: Tu X (CHN), Saad A (IRQ)

==== Group B ====
Team	Pld	W	D	L	GF	GA	GD	Pts
China	3	3	0	0	27	3	+24	9
Japan	3	2	0	1	17	9	+8	6
Jordan	3	1	0	2	12	24	−12	3
Qatar	3	0	0	3	7	27	−20	0

19 October 2014; 11:15	China	6–0	Japan	Seonhak International Ice Rink, Incheon; Referees: Houshang S (IRI), Park S (KOR)
19 October 2014; 11:15		Report		Seonhak International Ice Rink, Incheon; Referees: Houshang S (IRI), Park S (KOR)

19 October 2014; 17:45	Jordan	8–5	Qatar	Seonhak International Ice Rink, Incheon; Referees: Kultawongwattana W (THA), Houshang S (IRI)
19 October 2014; 17:45		Report		Seonhak International Ice Rink, Incheon; Referees: Kultawongwattana W (THA), Houshang S (IRI)

20 October 2014; 10:00	China	10–0	Qatar	Seonhak International Ice Rink, Incheon; Referees: Park S (KOR), Reza D (IRI)
20 October 2014; 10:00		Report		Seonhak International Ice Rink, Incheon; Referees: Park S (KOR), Reza D (IRI)

20 October 2014; 14:00	Jordan	1–8	Japan	Seonhak International Ice Rink, Incheon; Referees: Houshang S (IRI), Park S (KOR)
20 October 2014; 14:00		Report		Seonhak International Ice Rink, Incheon; Referees: Houshang S (IRI), Park S (KOR)

21 October 2014; 11:15	Japan	9–2	Qatar	Seonhak International Ice Rink, Incheon; Referees: Kultawongwattana W (THA), Park S (KOR)
21 October 2014; 11:15		Report		Seonhak International Ice Rink, Incheon; Referees: Kultawongwattana W (THA), Park S (KOR)

21 October 2014; 17:45	China	11–3	Jordan	Seonhak International Ice Rink, Incheon; Referees: Houshang S (IRI), Kang I (KOR)
21 October 2014; 17:45		Report		Seonhak International Ice Rink, Incheon; Referees: Houshang S (IRI), Kang I (KOR)

=== Knockout round ===
Semifinals
A1	Iran (IRI)	9
B2	Japan (JPN)	6
B1	China (CHN)	11
A2	South Korea (KOR)	9

Gold-medal match
A1	Iran (IRI)	10
B1	China (CHN)	0
Bronze-medal match
B2	Japan (JPN)	7
A2	South Korea (KOR)	6

==== Semifinals ====
22 October 2014; 10:00	Iran	9–6	Japan	Seonhak International Ice Rink, Incheon; Referees: Saad A (IRQ), Tu X (CHN)
22 October 2014; 10:00		Report		Seonhak International Ice Rink, Incheon; Referees: Saad A (IRQ), Tu X (CHN)

22 October 2014; 11:15	China	11–9	South Korea	Seonhak International Ice Rink, Incheon; Referees: Houshang S (IRI), Aldarsony A (KSA)
22 October 2014; 11:15		Report		Seonhak International Ice Rink, Incheon; Referees: Houshang S (IRI), Aldarsony A (KSA)

==== Bronze-medal match ====
23 October 2014; 15:00	Japan	7–6	South Korea	Seonhak International Ice Rink, Incheon; Referees: Reza D (IRI), Houshang S (IRI)
23 October 2014; 15:00		Report		Seonhak International Ice Rink, Incheon; Referees: Reza D (IRI), Houshang S (IRI)

==== Gold-medal match ====
23 October 2014; 16:15	Iran	10–0	China	Seonhak International Ice Rink, Incheon; Referees: Aldarsony A (KSA), Saad A (IRQ)
23 October 2014; 16:15		Report		Seonhak International Ice Rink, Incheon; Referees: Aldarsony A (KSA), Saad A (IRQ)

=== Goalscorers ===
Rank	Name	NPC	MP	G	PG	Total
1	Jafari Hassan	IRI	4	24	4	28
2	Kim Nam Oh	KOR	5	18	4	22
3	Ito Masatoshi	JPN	5	18	3	21
4	Hu Mingyao	CHN	5	15	2	17
5	Kim Min-woo	KOR	5	9	2	11
6	Sayahi Seyed Mehdi	IRI	3	8	1	9
7	Al Gamaly Abdulrahman	IRQ	3	8	0	8
7	Jalilvand Mohsen	IRI	4	6	2	8
7	Yang Mingyuan	CHN	5	7	1	8
10	Alsaragi Amer	IRQ	3	5	2	7
10	Bader Mohammad	JOR	3	4	3	7
10	Mohammad Hammam	QAT	3	5	2	7
10	Nobusawa Yoshu	JPN	5	7	0	7
14	Yu Qinquan	CHN	5	3	2	5
15	Al-Samry Waleed	IRQ	3	3	1	4
15	Soranji Mohammad	IRI	3	3	1	4
17	Alramahi Abed	JOR	2	2	1	3
17	Oh Jung Whan	KOR	4	3	0	3
17	Shi Yu	CHN	2	2	1	3
20	Hiroshi Kobayashi	JPN	5	2	0	2
20	Lee Sang Hoon	KOR	2	2	0	2
20	Mansouri Mohammad	IRI	5	1	1	2
20	Mohammad Alsaid	JOR	3	2	0	2
20	Yu Deyi	CHN	1	1	1	2
25	Dehghan Sajjad	IRI	3	1	0	1
25	Sukh-ochir Sodnompuntsag	MGL	3	1	0	1
25	Tuyshinjargal Damdinsuren	MGL	3	0	1	1
25	Yasir Faris	IRQ	2	0	1	1

=== Final standings ===
Rank	Team
1st place, gold medalist(s)	Iran
2nd place, silver medalist(s)	China
3rd place, bronze medalist(s)	Japan
4	South Korea
5	Iraq
6	Jordan
7	Qatar
8	Mongolia

== Women's tournament ==
=== Preliminaries ===
Team	Pld	W	D	L	GF	GA	GD	Pts
China	4	4	0	0	24	3	+21	12
Iran	4	3	0	1	25	8	+17	9
Japan	4	2	0	2	9	7	+2	6
South Korea	4	1	0	3	6	18	−12	3
Thailand	4	0	0	4	4	32	−28	0

19 October 2014; 14:00	China	2–1	Japan	Seonhak International Ice Rink, Incheon; Referees: Kang I (KOR), Reza D (IRI)
19 October 2014; 14:00		Report		Seonhak International Ice Rink, Incheon; Referees: Kang I (KOR), Reza D (IRI)

19 October 2014; 15:15	Thailand	0–4	South Korea	Seonhak International Ice Rink, Incheon; Referees: Saad A (IRQ), Aldarsony A (KSA)
19 October 2014; 15:15		Report		Seonhak International Ice Rink, Incheon; Referees: Saad A (IRQ), Aldarsony A (KSA)

20 October 2014; 16:30	Japan	1–0	South Korea	Seonhak International Ice Rink, Incheon; Referees: Aldarsony A (KSA), Saad A (IRQ)
20 October 2014; 16:30		Report		Seonhak International Ice Rink, Incheon; Referees: Aldarsony A (KSA), Saad A (IRQ)

20 October 2014; 17:45	Iran	11–2	Thailand	Seonhak International Ice Rink, Incheon; Referees: Kang I (KOR), Tu X (CHN)
20 October 2014; 17:45		Report		Seonhak International Ice Rink, Incheon; Referees: Kang I (KOR), Tu X (CHN)

21 October 2014; 14:00	South Korea	0–8	China	Seonhak International Ice Rink, Incheon; Referees: Saad A (IRQ), Houshang S (IRI)
21 October 2014; 14:00		Report		Seonhak International Ice Rink, Incheon; Referees: Saad A (IRQ), Houshang S (IRI)

21 October 2014; 15:15	Japan	1–4	Iran	Seonhak International Ice Rink, Incheon; Referees: Park S (KOR), Kultawongwattana W (THA)
21 October 2014; 15:15		Report		Seonhak International Ice Rink, Incheon; Referees: Park S (KOR), Kultawongwattana W (THA)

22 October 2014; 14:00	China	11–1	Thailand	Seonhak International Ice Rink, Incheon; Referees: Kang I (KOR), Reza D (IRI)
22 October 2014; 14:00		Report		Seonhak International Ice Rink, Incheon; Referees: Kang I (KOR), Reza D (IRI)

22 October 2014; 15:15	Iran	9–2	South Korea	Seonhak International Ice Rink, Incheon; Referees: Aldarsony A (KSA), Saad A (IRQ)
22 October 2014; 15:15		Report		Seonhak International Ice Rink, Incheon; Referees: Aldarsony A (KSA), Saad A (IRQ)

23 October 2014; 10:00	China	3–1	Iran	Seonhak International Ice Rink, Incheon; Referees: Kultawongwattana W (THA), Kang I (KOR)
23 October 2014; 10:00		Report		Seonhak International Ice Rink, Incheon; Referees: Kultawongwattana W (THA), Kang I (KOR)

23 October 2014; 11:15	Thailand	1–6	Japan	Seonhak International Ice Rink, Incheon; Referees: Reza D (IRI), Tu X (CHN)
23 October 2014; 11:15		Report		Seonhak International Ice Rink, Incheon; Referees: Reza D (IRI), Tu X (CHN)

=== Goalscorers ===
Rank	Name	NPC	MP	G	PG	Total
1	Salehizadeh Maryam	IRI	4	16	0	16
2	Zhao Kaimei	CHN	2	9	2	11
3	Jalilvand Samira	IRI	4	8	0	8
4	Sim Seon-Hwa	KOR	4	3	3	6
4	Zhang Wei	CHN	3	4	2	6
6	Jaengsawang Yada	THA	4	4	0	4
6	Temma Yuki	JPN	2	4	0	4
6	Wang Chun Hua	CHN	2	3	1	4
9	Wakasugi Haruka	JPN	4	3	0	3
10	Lin Shan	CHN	3	2	0	2
11	Adachi Akiko	JPN	2	1	0	1
11	Ju Zhen	CHN	3	1	0	1
11	Kouh Fallah Maryam	IRI	4	1	0	1
11	Urata Rie	JPN	3	0	1	1

=== Final standings ===
Rank	Team
1st place, gold medalist(s)	China
2nd place, silver medalist(s)	Iran
3rd place, bronze medalist(s)	Japan
4	South Korea
5	Thailand
