= Iran at the 2014 Asian Para Games =

- IOC code: IRI
- NPC: I.R. Iran National Paralympic Committee

in Incheon 18–24 October 2014
- Competitors: 200 in 16 sports
- Flag bearer: Shahabeddin Bassamtabar
- Medals Ranked 4th: Gold 37 Silver 52 Bronze 31 Total 120

Asian Para Games appearances (overview)
- 2010; 2014; 2018; 2022

Youth appearances
- 2009; 2013; 2017; 2021

== Competitors ==
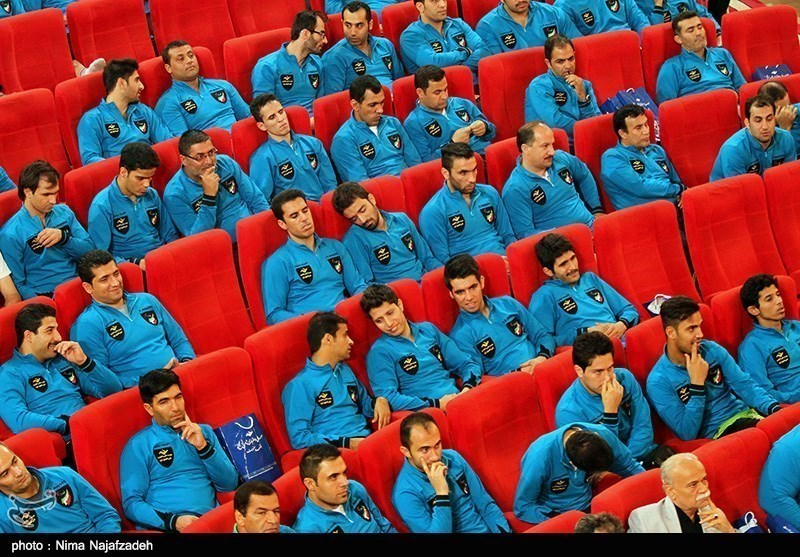
Iranian delegation

Sport	Men	Women	Total
Archery	5	4	9
Athletics	50	11	61
Badminton	0	1	1
Boccia	3	1	4
Cycling	2		2
Football 5-a-side	10		10
Football 7-a-side	13		13
Goalball	6	6	12
Judo	7		7
Powerlifting	9		9
Shooting	3	5	8
Sitting volleyball	12	12	24
Swimming	13		13
Table tennis	2	2	4
Wheelchair basketball	12	12	24
Wheelchair tennis	2		2
Total	149	54	203

== Medal summary ==
=== Medal table ===
Sport	Gold	Silver	Bronze	Total
Archery	4		1	5
Athletics	21	33	18	72
Football 5-a-side	1			1
Football 7-a-side	1			1
Goalball	1	1		2
Judo	1	3	3	7
Powerlifting	4	4		8
Shooting	2	2	1	5
Swimming	1	7	5	13
Table tennis		1	1	2
Sitting Volleyball	1	1		2
Wheelchair basketball			2	2
Total	37	52	31	120

== Results by event ==
=== Archery ===
recurve

Athlete	Event	Ranking round		1/16 eliminations	1/8 eliminations	Quarterfinal	Semifinal	Final	Rank
Athlete	Event	Score	Rank	1/16 eliminations	1/8 eliminations	Quarterfinal	Semifinal	Final	Rank
Gholamreza Rahimi	Individual standing	627	4 Q	Sajjad Ahmed (PAK); W 6–0; 25–18,28–19,27–19	Baatarjav Dambadondog (MGL); W 6–2; 26–17,27–19,20-22-27-21	Kimimasa Onodera (JPN); L 6–2; 20-23,24-29-23-24	Did not advance		
Ebrahim Ranjbar	Individual W1/W2	655	1 Q	Kairat Sakulov (KAZ); W 6–0; 27–16,21–17,24-12	Songchol Ri (PRK); W 6–2; 26-23, 27–22,20-28, 27–25	Myeong-Gu Lee (KOR); W 7–1; 29–22, 24–24, 29–24, 29–22	Kimimasa Onodera (JPN); W 6–0; 26-25, 23–22,29–24	Zhao Lixue (CHN)	
Razieh Shirmohammadi	Women's Individual Open	603	3 Q	BYE	Phannibha (THA); W 6–4; 25–22,21-21,26–24,15-24,18-18	Kimimasa Onodera (JPN); W 6'–4; 19-23,20-16,26-23,24-25,25-21	Ye Jinyan (CHN); L 2-6'; 25-26,25-22,20-27,26-28	Wu Chunyan (CHN)	
Zahra Nemati	Women's Individual Open	655	1 Q	BYE	Jyoti (IND); W 6–0; 26–14,29–22,24-15	Zeman Al-Saedi (IRQ); W 6–0; 27–22,25–21,26–15	Wu Chunyan (CHN); W 6–0; 27-21, 28–27,27–19	Ye Jinyan (CHN)	1st place, gold medalist(s)
Zahra Nemati; Ebrahim Ranjbar	Team open	1293	1 Q		Bye	Chinese Taipei; W 6–0; 37–32,32–30,34-28	South Korea; L 3-5; 37–30,35-38–30,32-32,31-32	Iraq	

=== Athletics ===
Men

Athlete	Event	Result	Score	Rank
Sadegh Beit Sayah	Shot Put - F57	11.42	11.42	2nd place, silver medalist(s)
Javid Ehsani Shakib	Shot Put - F57	10.07	12.01	2nd place, silver medalist(s)
Javad Dalakeh	Shot Put - F57	11.18	11.81	4
Erfan Hosseini	Javelin Throw - F12/13	59.97	940	1st place, gold medalist(s)
Sajad Bikparast	Javelin Throw - F12/13	56.79	911	2nd place, silver medalist(s)
Mohsen Kaedi	Javelin Throw - F33/34	33.30	828	2nd place, silver medalist(s)
Siamak Saleh-Farajzadeh	Javelin Throw - F33/34			
Younes Seifipour	Discus Throw - F32/33	13.64	472	3rd place, bronze medalist(s)
Alireza Mokhtari	Discus Throw - F51/52/53	21.86	817	1st place, gold medalist(s)
Hassan Dehghani	shot Put - F20	12.39	12.39	2nd place, silver medalist(s)

Athlete	Event	Round 1			Final		Rank
Athlete	Event	Heat	Time	Rank	Time	Rank	Rank
Habib Hosseini	200m - T12	1	23.15	1Q			
Hossein Saeidi	200m - T12	1	23.45	3	did not advance		
Ahmad Ojaghlou	200m - T47				22.72	4	4
Hossein Sadeghihevelaei	200m - T47	1	25.09	3	did not advance		
Peyman Nasiri Bazanjani	1500 m T20				4:00.29	1	1st place, gold medalist(s)
Hamid Eslami	5000 m T11				16:35.63	2	2nd place, silver medalist(s)
Ali Elahi	5000 m T12				15:37.40	2	2nd place, silver medalist(s)
Amin Babeli	5000 m T12				17:36.23	5	5

Women

Athlete	Event	Result	Score	Rank
Hajar Taktaz	Discus Throw - F11/12	21.01	720	2nd place, silver medalist(s)
Azam Khodayari	Discus Throw - F57	22.83	24.10	2nd place, silver medalist(s)
Fatemeh Montazeri	Discus Throw - F57	23.12	23.64	3rd place, bronze medalist(s)

Athlete	Event	Round 1			Final		Rank
Athlete	Event	Heat	Time	Rank	Time	Rank	Rank
Zahra Shahmohammadi	200m - T47				31.29	6	6

=== Badminton ===
Athlete	Event	Preliminary		Quarterfinal	Semifinal	Final	Rank
Athlete	Event	Groups	Rank	Quarterfinal	Semifinal	Final	Rank
Maryami Rahmani	Women's Singles SL 4 / SU 5	Indonesia; L 1-2; 18-21,24-22, 11-21					
Maryami Rahmani	Women's Singles SL 4 / SU 5	Thailand; L 0-2; 9-21, 12-21					
Maryami Rahmani	Women's Singles SL 4 / SU 5	Japan					

=== Boccia ===
Athlete	Event	Preliminary		Quarterfinal	Semifinal	Final	Rank
Athlete	Event	Groups	Rank	Quarterfinal	Semifinal	Final	Rank
Fatemeh Bahmani; Mohammadreza Kari	Mixed Pairs - BC3	Japan; L 3-7					
Fatemeh Bahmani; Mohammadreza Kari	Mixed Pairs - BC3	Singapore; W 3–2					
Fatemeh Bahmani; Mohammadreza Kari	Mixed Pairs - BC3	Macau; W 10–0					
Maryam Malekifalah; Zahra Ghanbari	Mixed Pairs -BC4	China; W 3–2					
Maryam Malekifalah; Zahra Ghanbari	Mixed Pairs -BC4	Thailand; L 0-11					
Maryam Malekifalah; Zahra Ghanbari	Mixed Pairs -BC4	United Arab Emirates; W 7–0					

=== Football 5-a-side ===
Men

Squad list	Round 1	Round 2	Round 3	Round 4	Rank
Sadegh Rahimi; Behzad Zadali; Kambiz Mohkam; Ahmad Shahhosseini; Mohammad Heidari; Hossein Rajabpour; Hojatollah Mazarei; Amir Pourrrazavai; Meysam Shojaeiyan; Akbar Shushtari	Thailand; W 1-0	China; W 2-1	South Korea; D 0-0	Japan; W 2-0	1st place, gold medalist(s)

=== Football 7-a-side ===
Men

Squad list	Preliminaries		Final	Rank
Squad list	Round robin	Rank	Final	Rank
Moslem Akbari; Jasem Bakhshi; Behnam Sohrabi; Hashem Rastegari; Mehdi Jamali; Moslem Khazaei; Farzad Mehri; Sadegh Hassani; Hossein Tiz Bor; Hassan Safari; Babak Safari; Ehsan Gholamhosseinpour; Rasoul Atashafrouz	Japan; W 3-0	1Q	Japan; W 5-0	1st place, gold medalist(s)
Moslem Akbari; Jasem Bakhshi; Behnam Sohrabi; Hashem Rastegari; Mehdi Jamali; Moslem Khazaei; Farzad Mehri; Sadegh Hassani; Hossein Tiz Bor; Hassan Safari; Babak Safari; Ehsan Gholamhosseinpour; Rasoul Atashafrouz	Singapore; W 3-0	1Q	Japan; W 5-0	1st place, gold medalist(s)
Moslem Akbari; Jasem Bakhshi; Behnam Sohrabi; Hashem Rastegari; Mehdi Jamali; Moslem Khazaei; Farzad Mehri; Sadegh Hassani; Hossein Tiz Bor; Hassan Safari; Babak Safari; Ehsan Gholamhosseinpour; Rasoul Atashafrouz	South Korea; W 14-2	1Q	Japan; W 5-0	1st place, gold medalist(s)

=== Goalball ===
Men

Squad list	Preliminaries		Semifinal	Final	Rank
Squad list	Group A	Rank	Semifinal	Final	Rank
Hassan Jafari; Sajjad Deghan; Mohammad Soranji; Mohsen Jalilvand; Mehdi Sayahi; Mohammad Mansouri	Iraq; W 13–4	1Q	Japan; W 9–6	China; W 10–0	1st place, gold medalist(s)
Hassan Jafari; Sajjad Deghan; Mohammad Soranji; Mohsen Jalilvand; Mehdi Sayahi; Mohammad Mansouri	Mongolia; W 10–0	1Q	Japan; W 9–6	China; W 10–0	1st place, gold medalist(s)
Hassan Jafari; Sajjad Deghan; Mohammad Soranji; Mohsen Jalilvand; Mehdi Sayahi; Mohammad Mansouri	South Korea; W 10–4	1Q	Japan; W 9–6	China; W 10–0	1st place, gold medalist(s)

Women

Squad list	Round 1	Round 2	Round 3	Round 4	Rank
Maryam Kouh Fallah; Samira Jalilvand; Zeinab Ghanbari; Maryam Jafarzadeh; Fatemeh Ghamsari; Maryam Salehizadeh	Thailand; W 11–2	Japan; W 4–1	South Korea; W 9–2	China; L 1-3	2nd place, silver medalist(s)

=== Powerlifting ===
Men

Athlete	Event	Result	Rank
Mohammad Karimi	49 kg	150	4
Amir Jafari	59 kg	188	1st place, gold medalist(s)
Hamzeh Mohammadi	59 kg	185	2nd place, silver medalist(s)
Majid Farzin	80 kg	230	2nd place, silver medalist(s)
Hamed Solhipour	88 kg	229.5	1st place, gold medalist(s)
Saman Razi	97 kg	208	2nd place, silver medalist(s)
Ali Sadeghzadeh	107 kg	225	1st place, gold medalist(s)
Siamand Rahman	+107 kg	290	1st place, gold medalist(s)
Mansour Pourmirzaei	+107 kg	255	2nd place, silver medalist(s)

=== Sitting volleyball ===
Men

Squad list	Preliminary		Semifinal	Final	Rank
Squad list	Pool B	Rank	Semifinal	Final	Rank
Majid Lashgari; Ramezan Salehi; Arash Ghareghorbaghi; Arash Khormali; Mahdi Babadi; Meisam Alipour; Mohammad Khaleghi; Ahmad Eiri; Mahdi Hamidzadeh; GOLESTANI Hossein; Sadegh Bigdeli; Davoud Alipourian	Mongolia; W 3–0; 25–2, 25–3, 25–10	1 Q	Iraq; W 3–0; 25–14, 25–22, 25–15	China	
Majid Lashgari; Ramezan Salehi; Arash Ghareghorbaghi; Arash Khormali; Mahdi Babadi; Meisam Alipour; Mohammad Khaleghi; Ahmad Eiri; Mahdi Hamidzadeh; GOLESTANI Hossein; Sadegh Bigdeli; Davoud Alipourian	Japan; W 3–0; 25–10, 25-11, 25–14	1 Q	Iraq; W 3–0; 25–14, 25–22, 25–15	China	
Majid Lashgari; Ramezan Salehi; Arash Ghareghorbaghi; Arash Khormali; Mahdi Babadi; Meisam Alipour; Mohammad Khaleghi; Ahmad Eiri; Mahdi Hamidzadeh; GOLESTANI Hossein; Sadegh Bigdeli; Davoud Alipourian	Kazakhstan; W 3–0; 25–7, 25–18, 25–12	1 Q	Iraq; W 3–0; 25–14, 25–22, 25–15	China	

Women

Squad list	Round robin		Semifinal	Final	Rank
Squad list	Round robin	Rank	Semifinal	Final	Rank
Zahra Abdi; Zeinab Maleki; Roghaiyeh Nemati; Zahra Dana; Nasrin Farhadi; Masoumeh Zareei; Tayyebeh Jafari; Sakineh Keshvari; Zahra Nejati; Batoul Jafarian; Samira Khaleghi; Mehri Fallahi	China; L 0–3; 15–25, 18–25, 7–25	2 Q	Japan; W 3–0; 25–18 25–15, 25–23	China	
Zahra Abdi; Zeinab Maleki; Roghaiyeh Nemati; Zahra Dana; Nasrin Farhadi; Masoumeh Zareei; Tayyebeh Jafari; Sakineh Keshvari; Zahra Nejati; Batoul Jafarian; Samira Khaleghi; Mehri Fallahi	Sri Lanka; W 3–0; 25–5 25–2, 25–9	2 Q	Japan; W 3–0; 25–18 25–15, 25–23	China	

=== Swimming ===
Men

Athlete	Event	Time	Rank
Erfan Esmaeili	50m Freestyle S9	30.43	10
Erfan Esmaeili	200m Individual Medley SM9	2:46.57	6
Maziar Mazi Sarbala	50m Freestyle S9	32.21	16
Maziar Mazi Sarbala	200m Individual Medley SM9	2:51.63	7
Shahin Izadyar	50m Freestyle S10	26.66	2nd place, silver medalist(s)
Reza Azarshab	50m Freestyle S10	29.87	9
Ali Amini	200m Freestyle S4	5:10.31	7
Alireza Jallali	200m Freestyle S4	5:33.35	8
Haroutunian Zargar	200m Freestyle S4	6:30.98	9
Hamed Asgharian	50m Freestyle S12	30.08	9
Hamed Asgharian	400m Freestyle S12	2:40.79	4
Hamed Asgharian	100m Breaststroke SB13	5:34.58	6
Mostafa Mohammadi	50m Freestyle S13	29.86	6
Vahid Keshtkar	50m Freestyle S13	29.54	5
Vahid Keshtkar	400m Freestyle S13	2:25.51	1st place, gold medalist(s)
Mohammadhossein Karimi	50m Freestyle S13	27.89	3rd place, bronze medalist(s)
Mohammadhossein Karimi	400m Freestyle S13	2:28.01	2nd place, silver medalist(s)

=== Table tennis ===
Men

Athlete	Event	Preliminary		Quarterfinal	Semifinal	Final	Rank
Athlete	Event	Groups	Rank	Quarterfinal	Semifinal	Final	Rank
Maryam Alizadeh	Single - TT3	Mi-Gyu Lee (KOR); L 1–3; 11–8, 8–11, 8–11, 6–11	Group B 3	Did not advance			
Maryam Alizadeh	Single - TT3	Osrita Muslim (INA); W 3-0; 11-4, 11, 7–11-2	Group B 3	Did not advance			
Elham Chazanisha	Single - TT3	Sonalben (CHN); L 0–3; 4–11, 7–11, 2–11	Group B 3	Did not advance			
Elham Chazanisha	Single - TT3	Sonalben Patel (INA)	Group B 3	Did not advance			

=== Wheelchair basketball ===
Men

Squad list	Preliminary		Semifinal	Final	Rank
Squad list	Group B	Rank	Semifinal	Final	Rank
Saman Ballaghi Einalou; Esmaeil Hosseinpour; Morteza Abedi; Vahid Gholamazad; Milad Kheradamand; Mohammad Sehi; Alireza Ahmadi; Mohammadhassan Sayari; Morteza Ebrahimi; Iman Bagzadehfard; Ebrahim Ahmadi; Majid Taheri	Malaysia; W 84–44	1 Q	Japan; L 75-84	Thailand	
Saman Ballaghi Einalou; Esmaeil Hosseinpour; Morteza Abedi; Vahid Gholamazad; Milad Kheradamand; Mohammad Sehi; Alireza Ahmadi; Mohammadhassan Sayari; Morteza Ebrahimi; Iman Bagzadehfard; Ebrahim Ahmadi; Majid Taheri	Kuwait; W 98–43	1 Q	Japan; L 75-84	Thailand	
Saman Ballaghi Einalou; Esmaeil Hosseinpour; Morteza Abedi; Vahid Gholamazad; Milad Kheradamand; Mohammad Sehi; Alireza Ahmadi; Mohammadhassan Sayari; Morteza Ebrahimi; Iman Bagzadehfard; Ebrahim Ahmadi; Majid Taheri	Thailand; W 93–48	1 Q	Japan; L 75-84	Thailand	
Saman Ballaghi Einalou; Esmaeil Hosseinpour; Morteza Abedi; Vahid Gholamazad; Milad Kheradamand; Mohammad Sehi; Alireza Ahmadi; Mohammadhassan Sayari; Morteza Ebrahimi; Iman Bagzadehfard; Ebrahim Ahmadi; Majid Taheri	Hong Kong; W 98–37	1 Q	Japan; L 75-84	Thailand	

Women

Squad list	Round 1	Round 2	Round 3	Rank
Zeinab Hassani; Jaddeh Tareh; Zahra Tavangar; Somayeh Kohzadpour; Kobra Heidari; Maryam Yavarpour; Nahid Khoeini; Neda Ferasati; Fatemeh Askari; Fatemeh Keshmiri; Roghayeh Soltani; Roya Soltani	China; L 15–111	Japan; L 14–95	South Korea	

=== Wheelchair Tennis ===
Men
Singles

Athlete	Event	Round of 32	Round of 16	Quarter Final	Semi Final	Final	Rank
Athlete	Event	Opposition Result	Opposition Result	Opposition Result	Opposition Result	Opposition Result	Rank
Mohammadreza Yaghoubi	Singles	Agus Fitriadi (INA); W 6-1 6-4	Sang-Ho Oh (KOR); L 1-6 0-6	Did Not Advance			
Hossein Mamipour	Singles	Bye	Sung-Bong Han (KOR); L 2-6 0-6	Did Not Advance			
