= Football 5-a-side at the 2014 Asian Para Games =

- Venue: Seonhak Hockey Stadium
- Location: Incheon, South Korea
- Dates: 19–23 October
- Nations: 5

Medalists
gold medal	Iran
silver medal	Japan
bronze medal	China

5-a-side football or blind football at the 2014 Asian Para Games were held in Seonhak Hockey Stadium, Incheon from October 19–23, 2014. There was 1 gold medals in this sport.

== Results ==
=== Group stage ===
Team	Pld	W	D	L	GF	GA	GD	Pts
Iran	4	3	1	0	5	1	+4	10
Japan	4	1	2	1	3	2	+1	5
China	4	1	2	1	3	3	0	5
South Korea	4	0	4	0	1	1	0	4
Thailand	4	0	1	3	0	5	−5	1

Source: APG
2014-10-19
13:00

South Korea	1–1	China
Jang Yeong-Jun 41'	Report	Lin Dongdong 4'

Seonhak Hockey Stadium, Incheon
Referee: Keong Loo Wai (MAS)
2014-10-19
15:00

Thailand	0–1	Iran
	Report	Zadaliasghari Yengejeh Behzad 17'

Seonhak Hockey Stadium, Incheon
Referee: Hu Jie (CHN)

2014-10-20
13:00

Thailand	0–3	Japan
	Report	Ochiai Hiroshi 14', 42'; Kawamura Ryo 27'

Seonhak Hockey Stadium, Incheon
Referee: Kim Young Chul (KOR)
2014-10-20
15:00

China	1–2	Iran
Lin Dongdong 44'	Report	Zadaliasghari Yengejeh Behzad 9'; Rahimighasr Sadegh 28'

Seonhak Hockey Stadium, Incheon
Referee: Calvet Yann Gilles (FRA)

2014-10-21
13:00

Iran	0–0	South Korea
	Report

Seonhak Hockey Stadium, Incheon
Referee: Hu Jie (CHN)
2014-10-21
15:00

Japan	0–0	China
	Report

Seonhak Hockey Stadium, Incheon
Referee: Yarmhammadi Kazem (IRI)

2014-10-22
13:00

Iran	2–0	Japan
Zadaliasghari Yengejeh Behzad 27', 39'	Report

Seonhak Hockey Stadium, Incheon
Referee: Hu Jie (CHN)
2014-10-22
15:00

South Korea	0–0	Thailand
	Report

Seonhak Hockey Stadium, Incheon
Referee: Iguchi Kenji (JPN)

2014-10-23
13:00

China	1–0	Thailand
Lin Dongdong 34'	Report

Seonhak Hockey Stadium, Incheon
Referee: Kim Young Chul (KOR)
2014-10-23
15:00

Japan	0–0	South Korea
	Report

Seonhak Hockey Stadium, Incheon
Referee: Keong Loo Wai (MAS)

=== Goalscorers ===
4 goals

- Zadaliasghari Yengejeh Behzad (IRI)

3 goals

- Lin Dongdong (CHN)

2 goals

- Ochiai Hiroshi (JPN)

1 goal

- Jang Yeong-Jun (KOR)
- Kawamura Ryo (JPN)
- Rahimighasr Sadegh (IRI)

== Medalists ==
Event	Gold	Silver	Bronze
Men's team	Iran (IRI) Heidari Mohammad; Mazarei Hojatollah; Mohkam Nashtifani Kambiz; Pourrazavi Haftdaran Amir; Rahimighasr Sadegh; Rajab Pour Hossein; Shahhosseiniardekani Ahmadreza; Shojaeiyan Meysam; Shoushtari Akbar; Zadaliasghari Yengejeh Behzad	Japan (JPN) Akihito Tanaka; Daisuke Sato; Hiroshi Ochiai; Kento Kato; Kenro Mihara; Naoya Abe; Robertoizumi Sasaki; Ryo Kawamura; Tomonari Kuroda; Yasuhiro Sasaki	China (CHN) Gao Kai; Lin Dongdong; Liu Meng; Niu Lei; Wang Yafeng; Wang Zhoubin; Wei Jiansen; Xu Guansheng; Xu Huachu; Zhang Lijing
