= Sitting volleyball at the 2014 Asian Para Games =

- Location: Incheon, South Korea
- Dates: 7–11 October

Sitting volleyball at the 2014 Asian Para Games in South Korea.

== Medalists ==
Event	Gold	Silver	Bronze
Men	Iran: Meisam Alipour Alkami; Davood Alipourian; Mahdi Babadi; Sadegh Beigdeli; Ahmad Eiri; Arash Gharehgorbaghi; Hossein Golestani; Mahdi Hamid Zadeh; Mohammad Khaleghi; Arash Khormali; Majid Lashgari Sanami; Ramzan Salehi Hajikolaei	China: Ding Xiaochao; Gao Hui; Jin Heng; Li Ji; Li Lei; Li Mingfa; Wang Haidong; Wang Shuo; Zhang Zhongmin; Zhou Canming	Iraq: Rami Abed; Ahmed Abohadma; Ahmed Al-Abod; Ahmed AL-Duhaimi; Abbas Al-Ghuraibawi; Mohammed Idan Khalaf Al-Lami; Ahmed Dahas; Muayad Hattab; Hadi Juboori; Mahdi Kaab
Women	China: Gong Bin; Jiang Jixiu; Lyu Hongqin; Sheng Yuhong; Wang Yanan; Xu Jie; Zhang Lijun; Zhang Xufei; Zhao Meiling	Iran: Zahra Abdi; Zahra Danayetous; Mehri Fallahi Daryakenari; Nasrin Farhadi; Batoul Jafarian Arjas; Tayebeh Jafarivardanjani; Sakineh Keshvari; Samira Khaleghi; Zeinab Maleki Dizicheh; Zahra Nejatiaref; Roghaiyeh Nemati Jegheh; Masoumeh Zarei Barouti	Japan: Sachie Akakura; Sachie Awano; Junko Fujii; Emi Kaneki; Satoko Kikuchi; Keiko Nagai; Michiyo Nishiie; Yoko Saito; Mikiko Sumitomo; Yukari Tanahashi

== Medal table ==
Rank	Nation	Gold	Silver	Bronze	Total
1	China (CHN)	1	1	0	2
1	Iran (IRI)	1	1	0	2
3	Iraq (IRQ)	0	0	1	1
3	Japan (JPN)	0	0	1	1
Totals (4 entries)		2	2	2	6

== See also ==
- Volleyball at the 2014 Asian Games
