= Wheelchair fencing at the 2014 Asian Para Games =

Wheelchair fencing at the 2014 Asian Para Games was held in South Korea.

== Medal table ==
| Rank | NPC | Gold | Silver | Bronze | Total |
|---|---|---|---|---|---|
| 1 | China (CHN) | 11 | 5 | 4 | 20 |
| 2 | Hong Kong (HKG) | 4 | 5 | 5 | 14 |
| 3 | South Korea (KOR) | 0 | 2 | 10 | 12 |
| 4 | Iraq (IRQ) | 0 | 1 | 5 | 6 |
| 5 | Malaysia (MAS) | 0 | 1 | 0 | 1 |
| 5 | Thailand (THA) | 0 | 1 | 0 | 1 |
| 7 | United Arab Emirates (UAE) | 0 | 0 | 1 | 1 |
| Totals (7 entries) | | 15 | 15 | 25 | 55 |

== Medalists ==
=== Men ===
| Event | Gold | Silver | Bronze |
|---|---|---|---|
| Individual Épée; Category A | Tian Jianquan; China | Sun Gang; China | Jang Dong-shin; South Korea |
| Individual Épée; Category A | Tian Jianquan; China | Sun Gang; China | Zainulabdeen Al-Madhkhoori; Iraq |
| Individual Épée; Category B | Hu Daoliang; China | Kim Gi-hong; South Korea | Ali Mnahi; Iraq |
| Individual Épée; Category B | Hu Daoliang; China | Kim Gi-hong; South Korea | Ammar Ali; Iraq |
| Individual Foil; Category A | Sun Gang; China | Ye Ruyi; China | Chen Yi Yun; China |
| Individual Foil; Category A | Sun Gang; China | Ye Ruyi; China | Chan Wing Kin; Hong Kong |
| Individual Foil; Category B | Hu Daoliang; China | Ammar Ali; Iraq | Chung Ting Ching; Hong Kong |
| Individual Foil; Category B | Hu Daoliang; China | Ammar Ali; Iraq | Yoo Hee-myung; South Korea |
| Individual Sabre; Category A | Ye Ruyi; China | Tian Jianquan; China | Chen Yi Yun; China |
| Individual Sabre; Category A | Ye Ruyi; China | Tian Jianquan; China | Chan Wing Kin; Hong Kong |
| Individual Sabre; Category B | Tam Chik Sum; Hong Kong | Mohamad Azrul Shaharuddin; Malaysia | Mohammed Alhebsi; United Arab Emirates |
| Individual Sabre; Category B | Tam Chik Sum; Hong Kong | Mohamad Azrul Shaharuddin; Malaysia | Kim Gi-hong; South Korea |
| Team Epee | China (CHN); Hu Daoliang; Sun Gang; Tian Jianquan | South Korea (KOR); Jang Dong-shin; Kim Gi-hong; Kim Sunghwan; Park In-su | Iraq (IRQ); Ammar Ali; Zainulabdeen Al-Madhkhoori; Hayder Al-Ogaili |
| Team Foil | China (CHN); Chen Yi Yun; Hu Daoliang; Sun Gang; Ye Ruyi | Hong Kong (HKG); Chan Wing Kin; Chung Ting Ching; Cheong Meng Chai; Wong Tang Tat | Iraq (IRQ); Ammar Ali; Zainulabdeen Al-Madhkhoori; Hayder Al-Olgaili; Ali Mnahi |
| Team Sabre | Hong Kong (HKG); Chan Wing Kin; Cheong Meng Chai; Tam Chik Sum | Thailand (THA); Worapon Gunpisan; Chaichan Jongjairak; Somparp Saenghuachang; Korakod Saengsawang | South Korea (KOR); Cho Yeongrae; Kim Gi-hong; Park In-su; Yoo Hee-myung |

==== Women ====
| Event | Gold | Silver | Bronze |
|---|---|---|---|
| Individual Épée; Category A | Rong Jing; China | Yu Chui Yee; Hong Kong | Kim Sun-mi; South Korea |
| Individual Épée; Category A | Rong Jing; China | Yu Chui Yee; Hong Kong | Justine Ng; Hong Kong |
| Individual Épée; Category B | Zhou Jingjing; China | Chan Yui Chong; Hong Kong | Yao Fang; China |
| Individual Épée; Category B | Zhou Jingjing; China | Chan Yui Chong; Hong Kong | Kim Jung-ah; South Korea |
| Individual Foil; Category A | Rong Jing; China | Justine Ng; Hong Kong | Kim Sun-mi; South Korea |
| Individual Foil; Category A | Rong Jing; China | Justine Ng; Hong Kong | Yu Chui Yee; Hong Kong |
| Individual Foil; Category B | Chan Yui Chong; Hong Kong | Zhou Jingjing; China | Yao Fang; China |
| Individual Foil; Category B | Chan Yui Chong; Hong Kong | Zhou Jingjing; China | Kim Jung-ah; South Korea |
| Team Épée | China (CHN); Rong Jing; Wu Baili; Yao Fang; Zhou Jingjing | Hong Kong (HKG); Chan Yui Chong; Fan Pui Shan; Justine Ng; Yu Chui Yee | South Korea (KOR); Bae Hyesim; Kim Jung-ah; Kim Sun-mi |
| Team Foil | Hong Kong (HKG); Chan Yui Chong; Fan Pui Shan; Justine Ng; Yu Chui Yee | China (CHN); Rong Jing; Wu Baili; Yao Fang; Zhou Jingjing | South Korea (KOR); Bae Hyesim; Kim Jung-ah; Kim Sun-mi |

== See also ==
- Fencing at the 2014 Asian Games
