= Judo at the 2014 Asian Para Games =

- Location: Incheon, South Korea
- Dates: October

Judo at the 2014 Asian Para Games was held at the Incheon Asiad Main Stadium in Incheon, South Korea from 20 to 23 October 2014.

== Medal summary ==
=== Medal table ===
Rank	Nation	Gold	Silver	Bronze	Total
1	Uzbekistan (UZB)	7	2	1	10
2	China (CHN)	5	0	2	7
3	Mongolia (MGL)	1	1	5	7
4	South Korea (KOR)	1	1	3	5
5	Japan (JPN)	0	4	4	8
6	Iran (IRI)	0	3	3	6
7	Thailand (THA)	0	2	0	2
8	Chinese Taipei (TPE)	0	1	0	1
9	India (IND)	0	0	3	3
Totals (9 entries)		14	14	21	49

== Medalists ==
=== Men ===
Event	Gold	Silver	Bronze
–60 kg	Sherzod Namozov; Uzbekistan	Uugankhuu Bolormaa; Mongolia	Lee Min-jae; South Korea
–60 kg	Sherzod Namozov; Uzbekistan	Uugankhuu Bolormaa; Mongolia	Li Xiaodong; China
–66 kg	Nurbek Berdiyorov; Uzbekistan	Park Jong-seok; South Korea	Saeid Rahmati; Iran
–66 kg	Nurbek Berdiyorov; Uzbekistan	Park Jong-seok; South Korea	Aajim Munkbhat; Mongolia
–73 kg	Feruz Sayidov; Uzbekistan	Mohammad Ali Shanani; Iran	Hidekatsu Takahashi; Japan
–73 kg	Feruz Sayidov; Uzbekistan	Mohammad Ali Shanani; Iran	Youn Sang-min; South Korea
–81 kg	Sharif Khalilov; Uzbekistan	Rung Chatphueng; Thailand	Seyed Omid Nouri Jafari; Iran
–81 kg	Sharif Khalilov; Uzbekistan	Rung Chatphueng; Thailand	Yusuke Hatsuse; Japan
–90 kg	Shukhrat Boboev; Uzbekistan	Aramitsu Kitazono; Japan	Mohammed Abed; Iran
–90 kg	Shukhrat Boboev; Uzbekistan	Aramitsu Kitazono; Japan	Erdenebelig Lkhagvadorj; Mongolia
–100 kg	Choi Gwang-geun; South Korea	Hamed Alizadeh; Iran	Shirin Sharipov; Uzbekistan
–100 kg	Choi Gwang-geun; South Korea	Hamed Alizadeh; Iran	Wang Song; China
+100 kg	Adiljan Tulendibaev; Uzbekistan	Hamzed Nadri; Iran	Kento Masaki; Japan
+100 kg	Adiljan Tulendibaev; Uzbekistan	Hamzed Nadri; Iran	Bea Pyeong-hwa; South Korea

=== Women ===
Event	Gold	Silver	Bronze
–48 kg	Li Liqing; China	Lee Kai-lin; Chinese Taipei	Shizuka Hangai; Japan
–48 kg	Li Liqing; China	Lee Kai-lin; Chinese Taipei	Bolortungalag Baasandorj; Mongolia
–52 kg	Sevinch Salaeva; Uzbekistan	Ayumi Ishii; Japan	Monisha Sundaramoorthy; India
–57 kg	Wang Lijing; China	Junko Miwa; Japan	Priyanka Annasaheb Ghumre; India
–63 kg	Zhou Tong; China	Mayumi Yoneda; Japan	Turuunaa Lkhaijav; Mongolia
–70 kg	Zhou Qian; China	Gulruh Rahimova; Uzbekistan	Khashtsetseg Batsukh; Mongolia
–78kg	Altantsetseg Nyamaa; Mongolia	Methawadee Nantharak; Thailand	Pappathi Chinnaswamy; India
+78kg	Yuan Yanping; China	Khayitjon Alimova; Uzbekistan	No bronze medalist

== See also ==
- Judo at the 2014 Asian Games
