= Shooting at the 2014 Asian Para Games =

Shooting at the 2014 Asian Para Games was held at the Ongnyeon International Shooting Range in Incheon, South Korea in October 2014.

== Participitating nations ==
Below is a list of all the participating NPCs

- Afghanistan (2)
- China (8)
- Hong Kong (3)
- India (2)
- Iran (8)
- Iraq (2)
- Japan (2)
- Kazakhstan (3)
- Kyrgyzstan (3)
- South Korea (15)
- Kuwait (1)
- Mongolia (5)
- Singapore (2)
- Sri Lanka (3)
- Chinese Taipei (4)
- Thailand (14)
- United Arab Emirates (4)
- Uzbekistan (1)
