= Rong Jing =

Chinese Paralympic fencer

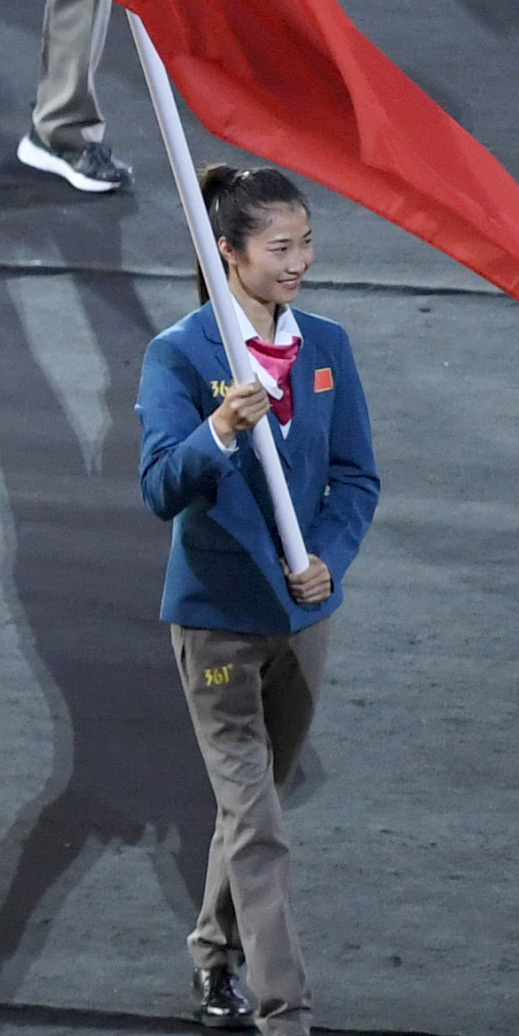
- Rong at the 2016 Paralympics

Personal information
- Born: 25 November 1988 (age 37) Nanjing, China

Sport
- Sport: Fencing
- Event(s): Foil, épée
Medal record
Representing China
Paralympic Games
Gold medal – first place	2012 London	Team open
Gold medal – first place	2016 Rio de Janeiro	Foil A
Gold medal – first place	2016 Rio de Janeiro	Team foil
Gold medal – first place	2016 Rio de Janeiro	Team épée
Gold medal – first place	2020 Tokyo	Team épée
Gold medal – first place	2020 Tokyo	Team foil
Silver medal – second place	2020 Tokyo	Épée A
Bronze medal – third place	2020 Tokyo	Foil A
Asian Para Games
Gold medal – first place	2010 Guangzhou	Foil A
Gold medal – first place	2010 Guangzhou	Team épée
Gold medal – first place	2014 Incheon	Épée A
Gold medal – first place	2014 Incheon	Foil A
Gold medal – first place	2014 Incheon	Team épée
Silver medal – second place	2014 Incheon	Team foil
Bronze medal – third place	2010 Guangzhou	Épée A
World Championships
Gold medal – first place	2013 Budapest	Épée A
Gold medal – first place	2013 Budapest	Team épée
Gold medal – first place	2019 Cheongju	Foil A
Silver medal – second place	2010 Paris	Foil A
Silver medal – second place	2011 Catania	Team épée
Silver medal – second place	2013 Budapest	Team foil
Silver medal – second place	2019 Cheongju	Épée A
Bronze medal – third place	2011 Catania	Foil A
Bronze medal – third place	2011 Catania	Team foil

Rong Jing (simplified Chinese: 荣静; traditional Chinese: 榮靜; pinyin: Róng Jìng; born 25 November 1988) is a Paralympic fencer from China. She competed in three foil and épée events at the 2016 Paralympics and won a gold medal in each of them. She served as the flag bearer for China at the 2016 Summer Paralympics Parade of Nations. She won the silver medal in the women's épée A event at the 2020 Summer Paralympics held in Tokyo, Japan. She also won two gold medals in the women's team épée and the women's team foil.

Paralympics
Preceded by Zhang Lixin	Flagbearer for China (Brazil) Rio de Janeiro 2016	Succeeded by Zhou Jiamin & Wang Hao
