= Sailing at the 2014 Asian Para Games =

Sailing at the 2014 Asian Para Games was held at Wangsan Sailing Marina in Incheon, South Korea, from 19 to 22 October 2014. There were 2 gold medals in this sport.

== Medal summary ==
=== Medal table ===
Rank	Nation	Gold	Silver	Bronze	Total
1	Malaysia (MAS)	1	1	1	3
2	Singapore (SIN)	1	0	0	1
3	Japan (JPN)	0	1	0	1
4	Hong Kong (HKG)	0	0	1	1
Totals (4 entries)		2	2	2	6

=== Medalists ===
Event	Class	Gold	Silver	Bronze
Single-Person Keelboat	2.4mR	Matrin Al Mustakim; Malaysia	Ani Azmi; Malaysia	Foo Yuen Wai; Hong Kong
Two-Person Keelboat	Dinghy 303	Singapore (SIN) Tan Wei Qiang; Yap Qian Yin	Japan (JPN) Kitagawa Mari; Yamamoto Shinya	Malaysia (MAS) Balawi Nurul Amilin; Junell Mustafah

== Participating nations ==
A total of 24 athletes from 5 nations competed in sailing at the 2014 Asian Para Games:

- Hong Kong (6)
- Japan (4)
- South Korea (6)
- Malaysia (4)
- Singapore (4)

== Results ==
Legend

- DPI — Discretionary penalty imposed
- DNF — Did not finish
- OCS — On the course side

=== Single-Person Keelboat ===
Rank	Athlete	Race									Total
Rank	Athlete	1	2	3	4	5	6	7	8	9	Total
1st place, gold medalist(s)	Matrin Al Mustakim (MAS)	1	1	1	1	1	1	~~2~~	2	1	9
2nd place, silver medalist(s)	Ani Azmi (MAS)	2	2	~~5~~	2	4	2	3	1	2	18
3rd place, bronze medalist(s)	Foo Yuen Wai (HKG)	7	6	3	3	~~8~~	5	1	3	7	35
4	Suto Masakazu (JPN)	5	5	2	5	2	~~8~~	7	7	6	39
5	Lee Chang - Hoon (KOR)	6	3	6	~~7~~	5	3	6	6	5	40
6	Yun Byeong - Hwan (KOR)	3	7	4	6	7	7	~~8~~	4	4	42
7	Tanimoto Yasuhiko (JPN)	4	~~8~~	8	8	3	4	5	8	3	43
8	Ko Chi Kin Derek (HKG)	~~8~~	4	7	4	6	6	4	5	8	44

=== Two-Person Keelboat ===
Rank	Team	Race									Total
Rank	Team	1	2	3	4	5	6	7	8	9	Total
1st place, gold medalist(s)	Singapore (SIN); Tan Wei Qiang; Yap Qian Yin	1	1	~~3~~	1	1	1	1	2	1	9
2nd place, silver medalist(s)	Japan (JPN); Yamamoto Shinya; Kitagawa Mari	2	2	2	3	6	~~8~~	2	4	2	23
3rd place, bronze medalist(s)	Malaysia (MAS); Balawi Nurul Amilin; Junell Mustafah	3	3	5	2	2	~~7~~	5	3	3	26
4	Singapore (SIN); Aaron Per Yong Quan; Ng Xiu Zhen	~~7~~	5	1	7	5	3	3	1	4	29
5	South Korea (KOR); Kang Cheon - Sik; Lee Sang - Un	6	4	4	4	~~9~~; OCS	2	6	5	5	36
6	Hong Kong (HKG); Cho Ping; Puk Chi Yeung	4	~~8~~	7	6	4	4	4	6	6	41
7	Hong Kong (HKG); Chan Man Hing; Lam Kin Wah	5	6	~~8~~	8	3	6	8	8	7	51
8	South Korea (KOR); Choi Won - Kuk; Choi Ki - Bum	~~8~~	7	6	5	7	5	7	7	8	52
