= IWRF Asia-Oceania Championship =

- Formerly: IWAS Asia-Oceania Championship, IWAS Oceania Championship
- Sport: Wheelchair rugby
- Continent: IWRF Asia-Oceania (Africa, Asia, Oceania)
- Most recent champion: Japan (3rd title)
- Most titles: Australia (8 titles)

The IWRF Asia-Oceania Championship or IWRF Asia-Oceania Zone Championship is the Asian-Oceanian wheelchair rugby championships that take place every two years between national teams of the continents. The Asia-Oceania Championship is also a qualifying tournament for the IWRF World Championships and the Paralympic Games.

Before 2009 the tournament was known as the Oceania Championship. The first Oceania Championship was held in 2001.

Due to the lack of other teams in Africa, the South African national team also competes in the Asia-Oceania championship. Canada was part of the tournament in 2007, but has been part of the IWRF Americas Championship since 2009.

== Summaries ==
Year	Host	Gold medal game			Bronze medal game		
Year	Host	Gold	Score	Silver	Bronze	Score	Fourth place
2001*; Details	New Zealand (Christchurch)	Australia	–	New Zealand	Japan	–	South Africa
2003*; Details	Japan (Chiba)	Australia	32–31	New Zealand	Japan	–	–
2005*; Details	South Africa (Brakpan)	New Zealand	44–43	Australia	Japan	–	South Africa
2007*; Details	Australia (Sydney)	Australia	47–41	Canada	New Zealand	29–25	Japan
2009; Details	New Zealand (Christchurch)	Australia	53–45	New Zealand	Japan	65–29	South Korea
2011; Details	South Korea (Seoul)	Australia	59–41	Japan	New Zealand	62–44	South Korea
2013; Details	South Africa (Pretoria)	Australia	55–48	Japan	New Zealand	65–33	South Africa
2015; Details	Japan (Chiba)	Japan	56–51	Australia	New Zealand	52–36	South Korea
2017; Details	New Zealand (Auckland)	Australia	53–46	Japan	New Zealand	44–41	South Korea
2019; Details	South Korea (Gangneung)	Australia	57–55	Japan	New Zealand	50–43	South Korea
2023; Details	Japan (Tokyo)	Japan	55–44	Australia	New Zealand	53–31	South Korea
2025; Details	Thailand (Bangkok)	Japan	53–52	Australia	New Zealand	46–35	South Korea

* = Oceania Championship

=== Championships per nation ===
Rank	Nation	Gold	Silver	Bronze	Total
1	Australia	8	4	0	12
2	Japan	3	4	4	11
3	New Zealand	1	3	8	12
4	Canada	0	1	0	1
Totals (4 entries)		12	12	12	36

== Participation details ==
Team	(New Zealand); 2001*	(Japan); 2003*	(South Africa); 2005*	(Australia); 2007*	(New Zealand); 2009	(South Korea); 2011	(South Africa); 2013	(Japan); 2015	(New Zealand); 2017	(South Korea); 2019	(Japan); 2023	(Thailand); 2025	Total
Australia	1st	1st	2nd	1st	1st	1st	1st	2nd	1st	1st	2nd	2nd	12
Canada	–	–	–	2nd	–	–	–	–	–	–	–	–	1
China	–	–	–	6th	–	–	–	–	–	–	–	–	1
Japan	3rd	3rd	3rd	4th	3rd	2nd	2nd	1st	2nd	2nd	1st	1st	12
Malaysia	–	–	–	–	–	–	–	–	–	–	–	6th	1
New Zealand	2nd	2nd	1st	3rd	2nd	3rd	3rd	3rd	3rd	3rd	3rd	3rd	12
South Africa	4th	–	4th	5th	5th	–	4th	–	–	–	–	–	5
South Korea	–	–	–	7th	4th	4th	–	4th	4th	4th	4th	4th	8
Thailand	–	–	–	–	–	–	–	–	–	5th	–	5th	2

* = Oceania Championship

== See also ==
- Wheelchair Rugby World Championships
- IWRF European Championship
- IWRF Americas Championship
- Asian Championship
