= South Korea women's national wheelchair basketball team =

South Korea
- IWBF zone: Asia Oceania
- National federation: Korea Wheelchair Basketball Federation

The South Korea women's national wheelchair basketball team is the wheelchair basketball side that represents South Korea in international competitions for women as part of the International Wheelchair Basketball Federation.

== History ==
South Korea hosted the 2005 edition of the Asia Oceania Wheelchair Basketball Championship in Daejeon but did not field a women's team. In 2009, the Red Fox Wheels was formed as the first women's wheelchair basketball team in South Korea consisting mostly of players in their 40s. They are affiliated with teh Goyang City Rehabilitation Sports Center.

South Korea took part at the for the first time in the 2011 edition hosted at home in Goyang.

The women's team took part at the 2014 Asian Para Games in Incheon finishing fourth.

== Competitions ==
=== Asian Para Games ===
Year	Position	W	L
(China) 2010	Did not enter		
(South Korea) 2014	4th	0	3
(Indonesia) 2018	Did not enter/qualify		
(China) 2022	Did not enter/qualify		
(Japan) 2026	Did not enter/qualify		
Total	1/5	0	3
