= Malaysia at the 2014 Asian Para Games =

- IOC code: MAS
- NPC: Malaysia Paralympic Council

in Incheon 18–24 October 2014
- Competitors: 54 in 8 sports
- Flag bearer: Muhammad Ziyad Zolkefli
- Medals Ranked 7th: Gold 15 Silver 20 Bronze 27 Total 62

Asian Para Games appearances (overview)
- 2010; 2014; 2018; 2022

Malaysia participated at the 2014 Asian Para Games in Incheon, South Korea from 18 to 24 October 2014.

== Medalists ==
Medal	Name	Sport	Event
Gold	Mohamad Faizal Aideal Suhaimi	Athletics	Men's 100 m T12
Gold	Mohammad Azlan Mat Lazin	Athletics	Men's 100 m T36
Gold	Mohammad Azlan Mat Lazin	Athletics	Men's 200 m T36
Gold	Nasharuddin Mohd	Athletics	Men's 400 m T20
Gold	Mohammad Azlan Mat Lazin	Athletics	Men's 400 m T36
Gold	Abdul Latif Romly	Athletics	Men's long jump T20
Gold	Mohamad Ridzuan Mohamad Puzi	Athletics	Men's long jump T36/37/38
Gold	Muhammad Ziyad Zolkefli	Athletics	Men's shot put F20
Gold	Siti Noor Iasah Mohamad Ariffin	Athletics	Women's 400 m T20
Gold	Siti Noor Radiah Ismail	Athletics	Women's long jump T20
Gold	Cheah Liek Hou	Badminton	Men's single SU5
Gold	Cheah Liek Hou & Suhaili Laiman	Badminton	Men's doubles SL3-4/SU5
Gold	Rafidah Mohamad Shahir	Lawn bowls	Women's singles B8
Gold	Mohd Ar Izwan Anuar & Rafidah Mohamad Shahir	Lawn bowls	Mixed pairs B8
Gold	Al Mustakim Matrin	Sailing	Single-Person Keelboat
Silver	Amir Firdauss Jamaluddin	Athletics	Men's 100 m T35/38
Silver	Mohamad Ridzuan Mohamad Puzi	Athletics	Men's 100 m T36
Silver	Amir Firdauss Jamaluddin	Athletics	Men's 200 m T35/37/38
Silver	Mohamad Ridzuan Mohamad Puzi	Athletics	Men's 200 m T36
Silver	Krishna Kumar Hari Das	Athletics	Men's 400m T38
Silver	Mohamad Saifuddin Ishak	Athletics	Men's long jump T11/12
Silver	Mohd Fazli Fauzil	Athletics	Men's long jump T20
Silver	Siti Noor Iasah Mohamad Ariffin	Athletics	Women's long jump T20
Silver	Muhamad Suhaili Ab Hamid & Ku Izham Ku Harun	Bowling	Mixed Double (TPB 2/3 + TPB 1/3)
Silver	Mohd Khairul Ishak & Ahmad Amil Husin	Bowling	Mixed Double (TPB 8 + TPB 8)
Silver	Ahmad Amil Husin Zainul Akmal Siran Muhamad Suhaili Ab Hamid	Bowling	Mixed Team (TPB 8 + TPB 2/3 + TPB 2/3)
Silver	Aiman Asyraff Ahmad Bajuri	Cycling track	Men's individual B 1 km Time trial
Silver	Mohd Ar Izwan Anuar	Lawn bowls	Men's singles B8
Silver	Mohd Shahmil Md Saad	Powerlifting	Men's -107 kg
Silver	Azmi Ani	Sailing	Single-Person Keelboat
Silver	Jamery Siga	Swimming	Men's 200 m freestyle S5
Silver	Jamery Siga	Swimming	Men's 50 m butterfly S5
Silver	Julius Jaranding	Swimming	Men's 100 m breaststroke SB13
Silver	Fraidden Dawan	Swimming	Men's 200 m individual medley SM10
Silver	Mohamad Azrul Shaharuddin	Wheelchair fencing	Men's Sabre Category B Individual
Bronze	Krishna Kumar Hari Das	Athletics	Men's 200 m T35/37/38
Bronze	Mohd Riduan Emeari	Athletics	Men's 200 m T36
Bronze	Mohd Riduan Emeari	Athletics	Men's 400 m T36
Bronze	Hemala Devi Eni Kutty	Athletics	Women's discus throw F11/12
Bronze	Umi Syuhadah Idris	Athletics	Women's discus throw F36/37/38
Bronze	Hemala Devi Eni Kutty	Athletics	Women's shot put F11/12
Bronze	Doriah Poulus	Athletics	Women's shot put F44
Bronze	Madzlan Saibon	Badminton	Men's single WH2
Bronze	Bakri Omar	Badminton	Men's single SL4
Bronze	Md Radhi Juhari Hairul Fozi Saaba	Badminton	Men's double SL3-4
Bronze	Azuan Amir Hassan & Zainul Akmal Siran	Bowling	Mixed Double (TPB 1 + TPB 2/3)
Bronze	Abu Bakar Nyat & Wong Kee Soon	Bowling	Mixed Double (TPB 9/10 + TPB 9/10)
Bronze	Mohd Khairul Hazwan Wahab	Cycling road	Mixed MB&WB road race
Bronze	Aiman Asyraff Ahmad Bajuri	Cycling track	Men's individual B Pursuit
Bronze	Mohd Najib Turano	Cycling track	Men's individual C4-5 Pursuit
Bronze	Lim Hock Kee	Lawn bowls	Men's single B7
Bronze	Rattna Aizah Mohd Idris	Lawn bowls	Women's single B6
Bronze		Lawn bowls	Mixed pairs B6
Bronze		Lawn bowls	Mixed pairs B7
Bronze	Jong Yee Khie	Powerlifting	Men's -97 kg
Bronze	Nurul Amilin Balawi; Mustafah Junell	Sailing	Two-Person Keelboat
Bronze	Jamery Siga	Swimming	Men's 50 m freestyle S5
Bronze	Fraidden Dawan	Swimming	Men's 400 m freestyle S10
Bronze	Zul Amirul Sidi Abdullah	Swimming	Men's 50 m backstroke S5
Bronze	Fraidden Dawan	Swimming	Men's 100 m backstroke S10
Bronze	Chee Chao Ming; Ting Ing Hock; Mohamad Azwar Bakar	Table tennis	Men's team C9-10
Bronze	Malaysia national wheelchair rugby team	Wheelchair rugby	Mixed team

Medals by sport
Sport	1st place, gold medalist(s)	2nd place, silver medalist(s)	3rd place, bronze medalist(s)	Total
Athletics	10	8	7	25
Badminton	2	0	3	5
Bowling	0	3	2	5
Cycling	0	1	3	4
Lawn Bowls	2	1	4	7
Powerlifting	0	1	1	2
Sailing	1	1	1	2
Swimming	0	4	4	8
Table tennis	0	0	1	1
Wheelchair fencing	0	1	0	1
Wheelchair rugby	0	0	1	1
Total	15	20	27	62

== See also ==
- Malaysia at the 2014 Asian Games
