= Lawn bowls at the 2014 Asian Para Games =

Lawn bowls at the 2014 Asian Para Games was held in South Korea.

== Medal table ==
Rank	NPC	Gold	Silver	Bronze	Total
1	South Korea (KOR)	7	7	3	17
2	Malaysia (MAS)	2	1	4	7
3	Hong Kong (HKG)	1	2	2	5
4	Japan (JPN)	0	0	1	1
Totals (4 entries)		10	10	10	30

== Medalists ==
=== Men ===
Event	Gold	Silver	Bronze
Singles B5	Kim Ki-man; South Korea	Tam Chi Ming; Hong Kong	Lee Jae-hong; South Korea
Singles B6	Im Chun-kyu; South Korea	Lee Jeong-kwan; South Korea	Hiroshi Uematsu; Japan
Singles B7	No Yong-hwa; South Korea	Seo Jong-cheo; South Korea	Lim Hock Kee; Malaysia
Singles B8	Chiu Chung Lun; Hong Kong	Ar Izwan Anuar; Malaysia	An Byung-soo; South Korea

=== Women ===
Event	Gold	Silver	Bronze
Singles B6	Kwak Young-sook; South Korea	Choi Mi-nyeo; South Korea	Rattna Aizah Idris; Malaysia
Singles B7	Youn Bok-ja; South Korea	Lee Gyeong-suk; South Korea	Chu Sau Lin; Hong Kong
Singles B8	Rafidah Shahir; Malaysia	Hong Suk-yo; South Korea	Tang Mei Yi; Hong Kong

=== Mixed ===
Event	Gold	Silver	Bronze
Pairs B6	Kwak Young-sook; Im Chun-kyu; South Korea	Choi Mi-nyeo; Lee Jeong-kwan; South Korea	Rattna Aizah Idris; Balasingam Sinnathamby; Malaysia
Pairs B7	Youn Bok-ja; Seo Jong-cheo; South Korea	No Yong-hwa; Lee Gyeong-suk; South Korea	Halimah Hassan; Lim Hock Kee; Malaysia
Pairs B8	Ar Izwan Anuar; Rafidah Shahir; Malaysia	Chiu Chung Lun; Tang Mei Yi; Hong Kong	An Byong-soo; Hong Suk-yo; South Korea
