= South Korea national wheelchair rugby team =

National sports team

South Korea KOR
- IWRF Zone: IWRF Asia-Oceania
- National Federation: Korean Wheelchair Rugby Association
- Coach: Ha Yeong-jun

Paralympic Games
- Appearances: None

World Championships
- Appearances: None

IWRF Asia-Oceania Championship
- Appearances: 8
- Medals: None

South Korea national wheelchair rugby team represents South Korea in international wheelchair rugby.

== History ==
The Korean Wheelchair Rugby Association (KWRA) was established in 2004, around the time that they were only four wheelchair rugby teams in South Korea.

South Korea has been participating at the IWRF Asia-Oceania Championship since 2007.

South Korea fielded a team for the inaugural wheelchair rugby tournament of the 2014 Asian Para Games hosted at home in Incheon. Japan won the first ever Asian Para Games wheelchair rugby gold medal.

The outcome of the wheelchair rugby event of the 2026 Asian Para Games in Aichi and Nagoya, Japan was different however. South Korea upset Japan, which were world rank no. 1 at the time for the gold medal.
