= Wheelchair rugby at the 2026 Asian Para Games =

- Venue: Wing Arena Kariya
- Location: Kariya, Aichi Prefecture, Japan
- Dates: 20–23 October 2026
- Nations: 3

Medalists
gold medal	South Korea
silver medal	Japan
bronze medal	Thailand

Wheelchair rugby will be one of the events at the 2026 Asian Para Games, which will be held at the Wing Arena Kariya from 20 to 23 October 2026. This will mark the sport's first appearance in 2014.

The tournament was supposed to feature four teams: Japan, Malaysia, South Korea, and Thailand. However, Malaysia withdrew on 11 September 2026.

== Schedule ==
The schedule is as follows:

P	Preliminary round	F	Final

Event↓/Date →	20th Tue	21st Wed	22nd Thu	23rd Fri
Mixed tournament	P	P	P	F

== Preliminary round ==
Pos	Team	Pld	W	D	L	PF	PA	PD	Pts	Qualification
1	South Korea	4	4	0	0	208	121	+87	12	Final
2	Japan (H)	4	2	0	2	189	178	+11	8	Final
3	Thailand	4	0	0	4	121	219	−98	4	

Source: Asian Para Games 2026
(H) Hosts

20 October 2026
10:00 UTC+9

Japan	33–47	South Korea
	Report

Wing Arena Kariya, Kariya

20 October 2026
13:00 UTC+9

South Korea	18–56	Thailand
	Report

Wing Arena Kariya, Kariya

21 October 2026
10:00 UTC+9

Japan	54–38	Thailand
	Report

Wing Arena Kariya, Kariya

21 October 2026
13:00 UTC+9

Japan	44–54	South Korea
	Report

Wing Arena Kariya, Kariya

22 October 2026
10:00 UTC+9

South Korea	51–26	Thailand
	Report

Wing Arena Kariya, Kariya

22 October 2026
13:00 UTC+9

Japan	58–39	Thailand
	Report

Wing Arena Kariya, Kariya

== Final ==
23 October 2026
13:00 UTC+9

South Korea	53–50	Japan
	Report

Wing Arena Kariya, Kariya

== Medalists ==
Event	Gold	Silver	Bronze
Men's team	South Korea (KOR): Chun Kyung-min; Kim Geon-yeob; Park U-cheol; Kim Dong-sung; An Young-jun; Kim Young-hoon; Kim Su-min; Park Seung-cheol; Lee Sug-eun; Kim Ryang-wook; Lee Seong-hui	Japan (JPN): Ryuji Kusaba; Rai Yamashiro; Atsuki Omine; Takuya Yamamoto; Hiroki Kawae; Katsuya Hashimoto; Soshi Aoki; Hiroki Hora; Kohei Suzuki; Yuna Nishimura; Yudai Akahoshi; Aren Shimazaki	Thailand (THA): Prempit Dechakhamkaen; Peyoros Boonrath; Phongnarin Chaisaart; Garunphon Gedmongkhon; Prasitnopparat Kiang-Urai; Gritsapong Wonguthai; Warut Philasa; Thanakan Ain tharanut; Sangad Sijad; Kissada Yimlamai; Nattaporn Taosrisakul; Sataporn Yoojaroen

Source: Asian Para Games 2026
