= Thailand national wheelchair rugby team =

National sports team

Thailand THA
- IWRF Zone: IWRF Asia-Oceania
- Coach: Tawatchai Jaisin

Paralympic Games
- Appearances: None

World Championships
- Appearances: None

IWRF Asia-Oceania Championship
- Appearances: 2
- Medals: None

Thailand national wheelchair rugby team represents Thailand in international wheelchair rugby.

== History ==
The Thailand national wheelchair rugby team is extant as early as 2015. It was supposed to debut at the 2015 Bali4s international wheelchair rugby tournament. But a volcanic eruption forced them to withdraw.

Thailand debuted at the IWRF Asia-Oceania Championship in 2019. They withdrew from the 2023 edition, before returning to the 2025 edition which Thailand hosted, where it finished fifth.

In January 2026, host Thailand and Singapore figures in the wheelchair rugby demonstration event at the 2025 ASEAN Para Games.

Thailand made their Asian Para Games debut in the 2026 edition in Aichi and Nagoya. They were among the three participating teams of the wheelchair rugby event and finished as bronze medalists.
