= Mongolia at the 2014 Asian Para Games =

- IOC code: MGL
- NPC: Mongolian Paralympic Committee

in Incheon 18–24 October 2014
- Competitors: 54 in 8 sports
- Medals Ranked 17th: Gold 2 Silver 1 Bronze 8 Total 11

Asian Para Games appearances
- 2010; 2014; 2018; 2022

Youth appearances
- 2009

Mongolia participated in the 2014 Asian Para Games in Incheon, South Korea from 18 October to 24 October 2014.

== Medal summary ==
=== Medals by sport ===
Sport	Gold	Silver	Bronze	Total
Judo	2	1	5	8
Athletics	0	0	1	1
Powerlifting	0	0	1	1
Shooting	0	0	1	1
Total	2	1	8	11

=== Medalists ===
Medal	Name	Sport	Event	Date
Bronze	Zandraagiin Ganbaatar	Shooting	Men's pistol 50 metre	19 October
Silver	B.Uugankhuu	Judo	Men's 60 kg	20 October
Bronze	A.Munkhbat	Judo	Men's 66 kg	20 October
Bronze	B.Bolortungalag	Judo	Women's 48 kg	20 October
Bronze	G.Tsogtgerel	Athletics	Women's shot put F57	21 October
Gold	Nyamaagiin Altangerel	Judo	Women's 78 kg	22 October
Bronze	L.Erdenebileg	Judo	Men's 90 kg	22 October
Bronze	B.Khashtsetseg	Judo	Women's 70 kg	22 October
Bronze	E.Sodnompiljee	Powerlifting	Men's 88 kg	22 October
Gold	Mongolia	Judo	Women's team	23 October
Bronze	Mongolia	Judo	Men's team	23 October
