= Wheelchair rugby at the 2014 Asian Para Games =

- Location: Incheon, South Korea
- Dates: October 16–24, 2014
- Nations: 4

Medalists
gold medal	Japan
silver medal	South Korea
bronze medal	Malaysia

Wheelchair rugby was one of the 23 sports featured at the 2nd Asian Para Games 2014, which took place in Incheon, South Korea on October 16–24, 2014. This was the first time that wheelchair rugby had been included at the Games, and was contested by four nations. The winners were Japan.

== Tournament ==
Four teams contested the 2014 Asian Para Games Wheelchair Rugby tournament. The preliminary round consisted of a group stage where the teams were placed into a single league which was contested as a round-robin. All the teams faced each other twice. The two top teams of the league would then face each other to contest the gold and silver medals, whilst the bottom two teams would play to contest the bronze medal. The eventual winners, Japan, finished the competition unbeaten.

=== Preliminary round ===
Team	Pld	W	D	L	GF	GA	GD	Pts
Japan	6	6	0	0	303	126	+177	18
South Korea	6	4	0	2	330	215	+115	12
Malaysia	6	2	0	4	184	297	-113	6
Indonesia	6	0	0	6	127	306	-179	0

19 October 2014
10:00

South Korea	58 – 21	Indonesia

19 October 2014
12:00

Japan	53 – 13	Malaysia

19 October 2014
15:00

South Korea	70 – 26	Malaysia

19 October 2014
17:00

Japan	46 – 10	Indonesia

20 October 2014
10:00

Malaysia	54 – 22	Indonesia

20 October 2014
12:00

Japan	53 – 40	South Korea

20 October 2014
15:00

Indonesia	32 – 57	South Korea

20 October 2014
17:00

Malaysia	19 – 49	Japan

21 October 2014
10:00

Malaysia	23 – 73	South Korea

21 October 2014
12:00

Indonesia	12 – 42	Japan

21 October 2014
15:00

Indonesia	30 – 49	Malaysia

21 October 2014
17:00

South Korea	32 – 60	Japan

=== Medal round ===
Bronze medal match

22 October 2014
10:00

Indonesia	29 – 50	Malaysia

Gold medal match

22 October 2014
14:00

South Korea	40 – 60	Japan
