= Thailand at the 2014 Asian Para Games =

- IOC code: THA
- NPC: Paralympic Committee of Thailand

in Incheon 18–24 October 2014
- Medals Ranked 6th: Gold 21 Silver 39 Bronze 47 Total 107

Asian Para Games appearances (overview)
- 2010; 2014; 2018; 2022

Youth appearances
- 2009; 2013; 2017

Thailand participated in the 2014 Asian Para Games–Second Asian Para Games in Incheon, South Korea from 18 to 24 October 2014. Athletes from Thailand won total 107 medals (including 21 gold), and finished sixth at the medal table.

== Medals summary ==
=== Medals by sport ===
Sport	Gold	Silver	Bronze	Total
Athletics	11	17	18	46
Boccia	3	3	1	7
Powerlifting	2	1	3	6
Wheelchair tennis	2	0	1	3
Swimming	1	6	11	18
Badminton	1	3	5	9
Shooting	1	2	2	5
Table tennis	0	3	6	9
Judo	0	3	0	3
Wheelchair fencing	0	1	0	1
Totals (10 entries)	21	39	47	107
