= China at the 2014 Asian Para Games =

- IOC code: CHN
- NPC: National Paralympic Committee of China

in Incheon 18–24 October 2014
- Competitors: 234 in 19 sports
- Medals Ranked 1st: Gold 159 Silver 93 Bronze 44 Total 296

Asian Para Games appearances (overview)
- 2010; 2014; 2018; 2022; 2026

Youth appearances
- 2009; 2013; 2017

China will participate in the 2014 Asian Para Games in Incheon, South Korea from 19 – 24 October 2014.

China also won 159 gold medals, 93 silver medals, 44 bronze medals and a total of 296 medals, finishing first on the medal table.
